= List of constituencies of the Uttar Pradesh Legislative Assembly =

Constituencies in the Legislative Assembly of Uttar Pradesh state in India

Uttar Pradesh Vidhan Sabha
- 18th Legislative Assembly of Uttar Pradesh

Type
- Type: Lower house of the Uttar Pradesh Legislature

Elections
- Voting system: First-past-the-post
- Last election: February - March 2022
- Next election: February - March 2027

Meeting place
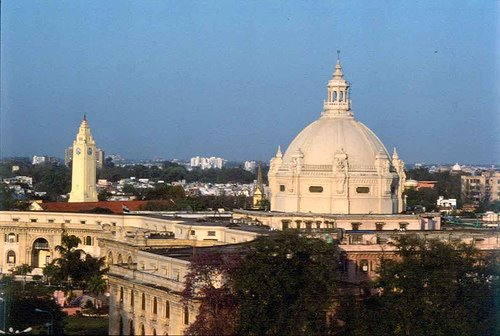
- Vidhan Bhavan, Lucknow

Website
- http://www.uplegisassembly.gov.in

Constituencies of Uttar Pradesh

The Uttar Pradesh Legislative Assembly is the lower house of the bicameral legislature of Uttar Pradesh. There are 403 seats in the house filled by direct election using single member first-past-the-post voting system.

== List of constituencies ==
Constituency number	Constituency name	Reserved for (SC/STNone)	Electors	District	Lok Sabha constituency
1	Behat	None	372,305	Saharanpur	Saharanpur
2	Nakur	None	355,632	Saharanpur	Kairana
3	Saharanpur Nagar	None	443,592	Saharanpur	Saharanpur
4	Saharanpur	None	359,546	Saharanpur	Saharanpur
5	Deoband	None	348,944	Saharanpur	Saharanpur
6	Rampur Maniharan	SC	323,830	Saharanpur	Saharanpur
7	Gangoh	None	386,148	Saharanpur	Kairana
8	Kairana	None	322,423	Shamli	Kairana
9	Thana Bhawan	None	326,817	Shamli	Kairana
10	Shamli	None	311,974	Shamli	Kairana
11	Budhana	None	377,680	Muzaffarnagar	Muzaffarnagar
12	Charthawal	None	331,171	Muzaffarnagar	Muzaffarnagar
13	Purqazi	SC	329,110	Muzaffarnagar	Bijnor
14	Muzaffarnagar	None	358,658	Muzaffarnagar	Muzaffarnagar
15	Khatauli	None	318,047	Muzaffarnagar	Muzaffarnagar
16	Meerapur	None	314,587	Muzaffarnagar	Bijnor
17	Najibabad	None	346,687	Bijnor	Nagina
18	Nagina	SC	346,910	Bijnor	Nagina
19	Barhapur	None	359,056	Bijnor	Moradabad
20	Dhampur	None	302,357	Bijnor	Nagina
21	Nehtaur	SC	303,720	Bijnor	Nagina
22	Bijnor	None	390,546	Bijnor	Bijnor
23	Chandpur	None	325,858	Bijnor	Bijnor
24	Noorpur	None	324,486	Bijnor	Nagina
25	Kanth	None	390,562	Moradabad	Moradabad
26	Thakurdwara	None	372,490	Moradabad	Moradabad
27	Moradabad Rural	None	389,729	Moradabad	Moradabad
28	Moradabad Nagar	None	529,243	Moradabad	Moradabad
29	Kundarki	None	380,673	Moradabad	Sambhal
30	Bilari (Note: Bilari is split between Moradabad and Sambhal districts)	None	359,209	Moradabad	Sambhal
31	Chandausi	SC	383,406	Sambhal	Sambhal
32	Asmoli	None	379,352	Sambhal	Sambhal
33	Sambhal	None	379,786	Sambhal	Sambhal
34	Suar	None	307,421	Rampur	Rampur
35	Chamraua	None	307,984	Rampur	Rampur
36	Bilaspur	None	345,202	Rampur	Rampur
37	Rampur	None	388,175	Rampur	Rampur
38	Milak	SC	357,452	Rampur	Rampur
39	Dhanaura	SC	346,449	Amroha	Amroha
40	Naugawan Sadat	None	328,672	Amroha	Amroha
41	Amroha	None	313,755	Amroha	Amroha
42	Hasanpur	None	364,215	Amroha	Amroha
43	Siwalkhas	None	339,738	Meerut	Bagpat
44	Sardhana	None	361,816	Meerut	Muzaffarnagar
45	Hastinapur	SC	344,527	Meerut	Bijnor
46	Kithore	None	365,516	Meerut	Meerut
47	Meerut Cantt.	None	430,144	Meerut	Meerut
48	Meerut	None	312,368	Meerut	Meerut
49	Meerut South	None	481,365	Meerut	Meerut
50	Chhaprauli	None	337,033	Bagpat	Bagpat
51	Baraut	None	304,200	Bagpat	Bagpat
52	Bagpat	None	316,266	Bagpat	Bagpat
53	Loni	None	513,114	Ghaziabad	Ghaziabad
54	Muradnagar	None	457,759	Ghaziabad	Ghaziabad
55	Sahibabad	None	1,020,386	Ghaziabad	Ghaziabad
56	Ghaziabad	None	473,009	Ghaziabad	Ghaziabad
57	Modinagar	None	332,327	Ghaziabad	Bagpat
58	Dhaulana (Note: Dhaulana is split between Ghaziabad and Hapur districts)	None	413,156	Hapur	Ghaziabad
59	Hapur	SC	368,481	Hapur	Meerut
60	Garhmukteshwar	None	348,800	Hapur	Amroha
61	Noida	None	714,072	Gautam Budh Nagar	Gautam Buddha Nagar
62	Dadri	None	606,316	Gautam Budh Nagar	Gautam Buddha Nagar
63	Jewar	None	352,164	Gautam Budh Nagar	Gautam Buddha Nagar
64	Sikandrabad	None	399,747	Bulandshahr	Gautam Buddha Nagar
65	Bulandshahr	None	399,775	Bulandshahr	Bulandshahr
66	Syana	None	387,326	Bulandshahr	Bulandshahr
67	Anupshahr	None	379,496	Bulandshahr	Bulandshahr
68	Debai	None	348,309	Bulandshahr	Bulandshahr
69	Shikarpur	None	334,480	Bulandshahr	Bulandshahr
70	Khurja	SC	389,211	Bulandshahr	Gautam Buddha Nagar
71	Khair	SC	407,399	Aligarh	Aligarh
72	Barauli	None	380,035	Aligarh	Aligarh
73	Atrauli	None	402,493	Aligarh	Aligarh
74	Chharra	None	387,108	Aligarh	Hathras
75	Koil	None	404,885	Aligarh	Aligarh
76	Aligarh	None	395,352	Aligarh	Aligarh
77	Iglas	SC	396,755	Aligarh	Hathras
78	Hathras	SC	416,253	Hathras	Hathras
79	Sadabad	None	376,981	Hathras	Hathras
80	Sikandra Rao	None	377,684	Hathras	Hathras
81	Chhata	None	364,870	Mathura	Mathura
82	Mant	None	346,386	Mathura	Mathura
83	Goverdhan	None	334,234	Mathura	Mathura
84	Mathura	None	459,369	Mathura	Mathura
85	Baldev	SC	376,964	Mathura	Mathura
86	Etmadpur	None	444,849	Agra	Agra
87	Agra Cantt.	SC	467,201	Agra	Agra
88	Agra South	None	367,502	Agra	Agra
89	Agra North	None	435,557	Agra	Agra
90	Agra Rural	SC	427,896	Agra	Fatehpur Sikri
91	Fatehpur Sikri	None	359,005	Agra	Fatehpur Sikri
92	Kheragarh	None	328,680	Agra	Fatehpur Sikri
93	Fatehabad	None	322,495	Agra	Fatehpur Sikri
94	Bah	None	334,525	Agra	Fatehpur Sikri
95	Tundla	SC	372,750	Firozabad	Firozabad
96	Jasrana	None	367,280	Firozabad	Firozabad
97	Firozabad	None	439,689	Firozabad	Firozabad
98	Shikohabad	None	357,741	Firozabad	Firozabad
99	Sirsaganj	None	321,298	Firozabad	Firozabad
100	Kasganj	None	364,023	Kasganj	Etah
101	Amanpur	None	310,854	Kasganj	Etah
102	Patiyali	None	359,278	Kasganj	Etah
103	Aliganj	None	342,212	Etah	Farrukhabad
104	Etah	None	337,616	Etah	Etah
105	Marhara	None	309,883	Etah	Etah
106	Jalesar	SC	297,452	Etah	Agra
107	Mainpuri	None	345,335	Mainpuri	Mainpuri
108	Bhongaon	None	343,606	Mainpuri	Mainpuri
109	Kishni	SC	310,906	Mainpuri	Mainpuri
110	Karhal	None	373,351	Mainpuri	Mainpuri
111	Gunnaur	None	411,191	Sambhal	Badaun
112	Bisauli	SC	421,258	Budaun	Badaun
113	Sahaswan	None	426,207	Budaun	Badaun
114	Bilsi	None	355,234	Budaun	Badaun
115	Badaun	None	376,111	Budaun	Badaun
116	Shekhupur	None	403,347	Budaun	Aonla
117	Dataganj	None	407,118	Budaun	Aonla
118	Baheri	None	366,445	Bareilly	Pilibhit
119	Meerganj	None	339,587	Bareilly	Bareilly
120	Bhojipura	None	378,098	Bareilly	Bareilly
121	Nawabganj	None	339,503	Bareilly	Bareilly
122	Faridpur	SC	328,070	Bareilly	Aonla
123	Bithari Chainpur	None	394,190	Bareilly	Aonla
124	Bareilly	None	457,691	Bareilly	Bareilly
125	Bareilly Cantt.	None	378,743	Bareilly	Bareilly
126	Aonla	None	315,035	Bareilly	Aonla
127	Pilibhit	None	378,862	Pilibhit	Pilibhit
128	Barkhera	None	323,808	Pilibhit	Pilibhit
129	Puranpur	SC	385,107	Pilibhit	Pilibhit
130	Bisalpur	None	360,883	Pilibhit	Pilibhit
131	Katra	None	338,784	Shahjahanpur	Shahjahanpur
132	Jalalabad	None	367,002	Shahjahanpur	Shahjahanpur
133	Tilhar	None	355,825	Shahjahanpur	Shahjahanpur
134	Powayan	SC	386,868	Shahjahanpur	Shahjahanpur
135	Shahjahanpur	None	411,329	Shahjahanpur	Shahjahanpur
136	Dadraul	None	355,882	Shahjahanpur	Shahjahanpur
137	Palia	None	360,503	Lakhimpur Kheri	Kheri
138	Nighasan	None	340,374	Lakhimpur Kheri	Kheri
139	Gola Gokrannath	None	396,212	Lakhimpur Kheri	Kheri
140	Sri Nagar	SC	319,314	Lakhimpur Kheri	Kheri
141	Dhaurahra	None	332,131	Lakhimpur Kheri	Dhaurahra
142	Lakhimpur	None	411,807	Lakhimpur Kheri	Kheri
143	Kasta	SC	309,700	Lakhimpur Kheri	Dhaurahra
144	Mohammdi	None	338,672	Lakhimpur Kheri	Dhaurahra
145	Maholi	None	378,908	Sitapur	Dhaurahra
146	Sitapur	None	399,285	Sitapur	Sitapur
147	Hargaon	SC	326,771	Sitapur	Dhaurahra
148	Laharpur	None	354,502	Sitapur	Sitapur
149	Biswan	None	337,785	Sitapur	Sitapur
150	Sevata	None	314,101	Sitapur	Sitapur
151	Mahmoodabad	None	315,617	Sitapur	Sitapur
152	Sidhauli	SC	355,182	Sitapur	Mohanlalganj
153	Misrikh	SC	359,505	Sitapur	Misrikh
154	Sawayazpur	None	403,324	Hardoi	Hardoi
155	Shahabad	None	355,083	Hardoi	Hardoi
156	Hardoi	None	414,295	Hardoi	Hardoi
157	Gopamau	SC	343,678	Hardoi	Hardoi
158	Sandi	SC	332,011	Hardoi	Hardoi
159	Bilgram-Mallanwan	None	381,886	Hardoi	Misrikh
160	Balamau	SC	347,218	Hardoi	Misrikh
161	Sandila	None	341,211	Hardoi	Misrikh
162	Bangarmau	None	357,452	Unnao	Unnao
163	Safipur	SC	346,258	Unnao	Unnao
164	Mohan	SC	342,858	Unnao	Unnao
165	Unnao	None	409,927	Unnao	Unnao
166	Bhagwantnagar	None	417,945	Unnao	Unnao
167	Purwa	None	415,472	Unnao	Unnao
168	Malihabad	SC	360,275	Lucknow	Mohanlalganj
169	Bakshi Kaa Talab	None	456,965	Lucknow	Mohanlalganj
170	Sarojini Nagar	None	567,252	Lucknow	Mohanlalganj
171	Lucknow West	None	443,178	Lucknow	Lucknow
172	Lucknow North	None	463,839	Lucknow	Lucknow
173	Lucknow East	None	457,521	Lucknow	Lucknow
174	Lucknow Central	None	370,629	Lucknow	Lucknow
175	Lucknow Cantonment	None	368,156	Lucknow	Lucknow
176	Mohanlalganj	SC	363,044	Lucknow	Mohanlalganj
177	Bachhrawan	SC	337,025	Raebareli	Rae Bareli
178	Tiloi	None	351,462	Amethi	Amethi
179	Harchandpur	None	319,603	Raebareli	Rae Bareli
180	Rae Bareli	None	366,267	Raebareli	Rae Bareli
181	Salon	SC	349,294	Amethi	Amethi
182	Sareni	None	371,469	Amethi	Amethi
183	Unchahar	None	339,043	Amethi	Rae Bareli
184	Jagdishpur (Note: Jagdishpur is split between Amethi and Sultanpur districts)	SC	378,415	Amethi	Amethi
185	Gauriganj	None	350,093	Amethi	Amethi
186	Amethi	None	349,837	Amethi	Amethi
187	Isauli	None	358,604	Sultanpur	Sultanpur
188	Sultanpur	None	380,581	Sultanpur	Sultanpur
189	Sadar	None	344,326	Sultanpur	Sultanpur
190	Lambhua	None	369,085	Sultanpur	Sultanpur
191	Kadipur	SC	379,507	Sultanpur	Sultanpur
192	Kaimganj	SC	392,514	Farrukhabad	Farrukhabad
193	Amritpur	None	314,663	Farrukhabad	Farrukhabad
194	Farrukhabad	None	372,555	Farrukhabad	Farrukhabad
195	Bhojpur	None	319,917	Farrukhabad	Farrukhabad
196	Chhibramau	None	463,433	Kannauj	Kannauj
197	Tirwa	None	380,571	Kannauj	Kannauj
198	Kannauj	SC	428,851	Kannauj	Kannauj
199	Jaswantnagar	None	392,072	Etawah	Mainpuri
200	Etawah	None	406,509	Etawah	Etawah
201	Bharthana	SC	407,642	Etawah	Etawah
202	Bidhuna	None	364,682	Auraiya	Kannauj
203	Dibiyapur	None	323,150	Auraiya	Etawah
204	Auraiya	SC	332,885	Auraiya	Etawah
205	Rasulabad	SC	323,657	Kanpur Dehat	Kannauj
206	Akbarpur-Raniya	None	327,275	Kanpur Dehat	Akbarpur
207	Sikandra	None	331,601	Kanpur Dehat	Etawah
208	Bhognipur	None	350,293	Kanpur Dehat	Jalaun
209	Bilhaur	SC	392,993	Kanpur Nagar	Misrikh
210	Bithoor	None	368,419	Kanpur Nagar	Akbarpur
211	Kalyanpur	None	355,100	Kanpur Nagar	Akbarpur
212	Govind Nagar	None	351,663	Kanpur Nagar	Kanpur
213	Sishamau	None	274,888	Kanpur Nagar	Kanpur
214	Arya Nagar	None	298,520	Kanpur Nagar	Kanpur
215	Kidwai Nagar	None	348,846	Kanpur Nagar	Kanpur
216	Kanpur Cantonment	None	361,855	Kanpur Nagar	Kanpur
217	Maharajpur	None	448,458	Kanpur Nagar	Akbarpur
218	Ghatampur	SC	324,443	Kanpur Nagar	Akbarpur
219	Madhogarh	None	445,421	Jalaun	Jalaun
220	Kalpi	None	394,653	Jalaun	Jalaun
221	Orai	SC	444,977	Jalaun	Jalaun
222	Babina	None	331,743	Jhansi	Jhansi
223	Jhansi Nagar	None	422,164	Jhansi	Jhansi
224	Mauranipur	SC	413,770	Jhansi	Jhansi
225	Garautha	None	351,859	Jhansi	Jalaun
226	Lalitpur	None	487,976	Lalitpur	Jhansi
227	Mehroni	SC	449,905	Lalitpur	Jhansi
228	Hamirpur	None	412,700	Hamirpur	Hamirpur
229	Rath	SC	399,594	Hamirpur	Hamirpur
230	Mahoba	None	316,799	Mahoba	Hamirpur
231	Charkhari	None	346,471	Mahoba	Hamirpur
232	Tindwari	None	318,385	Banda	Hamirpur
233	Baberu	None	338,211	Banda	Banda
234	Naraini	SC	342,361	Banda	Banda
235	Banda	None	310,282	Banda	Banda
236	Chitrakoot	None	375,123	Chitrakoot	Banda
237	Manikpur	None	338,989	Chitrakoot	Banda
238	Jahanabad	None	311,482	Fatehpur	Fatehpur
239	Bindki	None	312,930	Fatehpur	Fatehpur
240	Fatehpur	None	357,518	Fatehpur	Fatehpur
241	Ayah Shah	None	274,485	Fatehpur	Fatehpur
242	Husainganj	None	304,518	Fatehpur	Fatehpur
243	Khaga	SC	342,812	Fatehpur	Fatehpur
244	Rampur Khas	None	320,772	Pratapgarh	Pratapgarh
245	Babaganj	SC	319,665	Pratapgarh	Kaushambi
246	Kunda	None	357,938	Pratapgarh	Kaushambi
247	Vishwanathganj	None	399,623	Pratapgarh	Pratapgarh
248	Pratapgarh	None	355,158	Pratapgarh	Pratapgarh
249	Patti	None	366,452	Pratapgarh	Pratapgarh
250	Raniganj	None	336,072	Pratapgarh	Pratapgarh
251	Sirathu	None	381,662	Kaushambi	Kaushambi
252	Manjhanpur	SC	416,731	Kaushambi	Kaushambi
253	Chail	None	387,838	Kaushambi	Kaushambi
254	Phaphamau	None	366,164	Prayagraj	Phulpur
255	Soraon	SC	380,283	Prayagraj	Phulpur
256	Phulpur	None	408,793	Prayagraj	Phulpur
257	Pratappur	None	406,567	Prayagraj	Bhadohi
258	Handia	None	401,042	Prayagraj	Bhadohi
259	Meja	None	325,904	Prayagraj	Prayagraj
260	Karachhana	None	349,959	Prayagraj	Prayagraj
261	Prayagraj West	None	459,599	Prayagraj	Phulpur
262	Prayagraj North	None	442,351	Prayagraj	Phulpur
263	Prayagraj South	None	408,293	Prayagraj	Prayagraj
264	Bara	SC	334,880	Prayagraj	Prayagraj
265	Koraon	SC	351,637	Prayagraj	Prayagraj
266	Kursi	None	395,071	Barabanki	Barabanki
267	Ram Nagar	None	338,326	Barabanki	Barabanki
268	Barabanki	None	392,184	Barabanki	Barabanki
269	Zaidpur	SC	396,995	Barabanki	Barabanki
270	Dariyabad	None	412,472	Barabanki	Ayodhya
271	Rudauli	None	356,678	Ayodhya	Ayodhya
272	Haidergarh	SC	349,784	Barabanki	Barabanki
273	Milkipur	SC	358,203	Ayodhya	Ayodhya
274	Bikapur	None	380,107	Ayodhya	Ayodhya
275	Ayodhya	None	382,056	Ayodhya	Ayodhya
276	Goshainganj	None	395,118	Ayodhya	Ambedkar Nagar
277	Katehari	None	394,267	Ambedkar Nagar	Ambedkar Nagar
278	Tanda	None	329,754	Ambedkar Nagar	Ambedkar Nagar
279	Alapur	SC	339,969	Ambedkar Nagar	Sant Kabir Nagar
280	Jalalpur	None	407,064	Ambedkar Nagar	Ambedkar Nagar
281	Akbarpur	None	332,577	Ambedkar Nagar	Ambedkar Nagar
282	Balha	SC	362,718	Bahraich	Bahraich
283	Nanpara	None	343,881	Bahraich	Bahraich
284	Matera	None	342,204	Bahraich	Bahraich
285	Mahasi	None	339,363	Bahraich	Bahraich
286	Bahraich	None	391,794	Bahraich	Bahraich
287	Payagpur	None	390,097	Bahraich	Kaiserganj
288	Kaiserganj	None	390,653	Bahraich	Kaiserganj
289	Bhinga	None	393,315	Shrawasti	Shrawasti
290	Shrawasti	None	416,147	Shrawasti	Shrawasti
291	Tulsipur	None	383,960	Balrampur	Shrawasti
292	Gainsari	None	365,598	Balrampur	Shrawasti
293	Utraula	None	435,310	Balrampur	Gonda
294	Balrampur	SC	428,009	Balrampur	Shrawasti
295	Mehnaun	None	366,079	Gonda	Gonda
296	Gonda	None	347,946	Gonda	Gonda
297	Katra Bazar	None	387,612	Gonda	Kaiserganj
298	Colonelganj	None	330,403	Gonda	Kaiserganj
299	Tarabganj	None	367,243	Gonda	Kaiserganj
300	Mankapur	SC	331,841	Gonda	Gonda
301	Gaura	None	320,821	Gonda	Gonda
302	Shohratgarh	None	359,244	Siddharthnagar	Domariyaganj
303	Kapilvastu	SC	452,988	Siddharthnagar	Domariyaganj
304	Bansi	None	381,240	Siddharthnagar	Domariyaganj
305	Itwa	None	336,392	Siddharthnagar	Domariyaganj
306	Domariyaganj	None	409,760	Siddharthnagar	Domariyaganj
307	Harraiya	None	388,924	Basti	Basti
308	Kaptanganj	None	365,410	Basti	Basti
309	Rudhauli	None	430,608	Basti	Basti
310	Basti Sadar	None	371,546	Basti	Basti
311	Mahadewa	SC	360,632	Basti	Basti
312	Menhdawal	None	457,864	Sant Kabir Nagar	Sant Kabir Nagar
313	Khalilabad	None	457,995	Sant Kabir Nagar	Sant Kabir Nagar
314	Dhanghata	SC	387,446	Sant Kabir Nagar	Sant Kabir Nagar
315	Pharenda	None	351,362	Maharajganj	Maharajganj
316	Nautanwa	None	366,588	Maharajganj	Maharajganj
317	Siswa	None	389,369	Maharajganj	Maharajganj
318	Maharajganj	SC	413,958	Maharajganj	Maharajganj
319	Paniyara	None	423,585	Maharajganj	Maharajganj
320	Caimpiyarganj	None	383,702	Gorakhpur	Gorakhpur
321	Pipraich	None	406,778	Gorakhpur	Gorakhpur
322	Gorakhpur Urban	None	464,784	Gorakhpur	Gorakhpur
323	Gorakhpur Rural	None	419,269	Gorakhpur	Gorakhpur
324	Sahajanwa	None	379,627	Gorakhpur	Gorakhpur
325	Khajani	SC	380,081	Gorakhpur	Sant Kabir Nagar
326	Chauri-Chaura	None	355,127	Gorakhpur	Bansgaon
327	Bansgaon	SC	381,065	Gorakhpur	Bansgaon
328	Chillupar	None	429,908	Gorakhpur	Bansgaon
329	Khadda	None	340,053	Kushinagar	Kushi Nagar
330	Padrauna	None	382,530	Kushinagar	Kushi Nagar
331	Tamkuhi Raj	None	400,300	Kushinagar	Deoria
332	Fazilnagar	None	400,053	Kushinagar	Deoria
333	Kushinagar	None	373,232	Kushinagar	Kushi Nagar
334	Hata	None	373,470	Kushinagar	Kushi Nagar
335	Ramkola	SC	371,916	Kushinagar	Kushi Nagar
336	Rudrapur	None	321,349	Deoria	Bansgaon
337	Deoria	None	351,651	Deoria	Deoria
338	Pathardeva	None	338,872	Deoria	Deoria
339	Rampur Karkhana	None	356,278	Deoria	Deoria
340	Bhatpar Rani	None	338,287	Deoria	Salempur
341	Salempur	SC	344,224	Deoria	Salempur
342	Barhaj	None	318,521	Deoria	Bansgaon
343	Atrauliya	None	380,092	Azamgarh	Lalganj
344	Gopalpur	None	350,363	Azamgarh	Azamgarh
345	Sagri	None	336,378	Azamgarh	Azamgarh
346	Mubarakpur	None	354,153	Azamgarh	Azamgarh
347	Azamgarh	None	396,271	Azamgarh	Azamgarh
348	Nizamabad	None	327,480	Azamgarh	Lalganj
349	Phoolpur Pawai	None	328,807	Azamgarh	Lalganj
350	Didarganj	None	365,522	Azamgarh	Lalganj
351	Lalganj	SC	407,539	Azamgarh	Lalganj
352	Mehnagar	SC	404,280	Azamgarh	Azamgarh
353	Madhuban	None	403,798	Mau	Ghosi
354	Ghosi	None	438,832	Mau	Ghosi
355	Muhammadabad-Gohna	SC	380,470	Mau	Ghosi
356	Mau	None	481,715	Mau	Ghosi
357	Belthara Road	SC	358,231	Ballia	Salempur
358	Rasara	None	356,377	Ballia	Ghosi
359	Sikanderpur	None	307,974	Ballia	Salempur
360	Phephana	None	331,153	Ballia	Ballia
361	Ballia Nagar	None	375,300	Ballia	Ballia
362	Bansdih	None	408,263	Ballia	Salempur
363	Bairia	None	367,176	Ballia	Ballia
364	Badlapur	None	351,356	Jaunpur	Jaunpur
365	Shahganj	None	407,439	Jaunpur	Jaunpur
366	Jaunpur	None	435,634	Jaunpur	Jaunpur
367	Malhani	None	379,389	Jaunpur	Jaunpur
368	Mungra Badshahpur	None	386,422	Jaunpur	Jaunpur
369	Machhlishahr	SC	402,078	Jaunpur	Machhlishahr
370	Mariyahu	None	337,483	Jaunpur	Machhlishahr
371	Zafrabad	None	398,511	Jaunpur	Machhlishahr
372	Kerakat	SC	416,720	Jaunpur	Machhlishahr
373	Jakhanian	SC	432,337	Ghazipur	Ghazipur
374	Saidpur	SC	400,659	Ghazipur	Ghazipur
375	Ghazipur Sadar	None	365,238	Ghazipur	Ghazipur
376	Jangipur	None	376,819	Ghazipur	Ghazipur
377	Zahoorabad	None	407,091	Ghazipur	Ballia
378	Mohammadabad	None	424,837	Ghazipur	Ballia
379	Zamania	None	425,978	Ghazipur	Ghazipur
380	Mughalsarai	None	400,830	Chandauli	Chandauli
381	Sakaldiha	None	335,828	Chandauli	Chandauli
382	Saiyadraja	None	333,280	Chandauli	Chandauli
383	Chakia	SC	378,414	Chandauli	Robertsganj
384	Pindra	None	373,472	Varanasi	Machhlishahr
385	Ajagara	SC	374,068	Varanasi	Chandauli
386	Shivpur	None	374,563	Varanasi	Chandauli
387	Rohaniya	None	408,653	Varanasi	Varanasi
388	Varanasi North	None	427,134	Varanasi	Varanasi
389	Varanasi South	None	323,551	Varanasi	Varanasi
390	Varanasi Cantt.	None	459,277	Varanasi	Varanasi
391	Sevapuri	None	346,090	Varanasi	Varanasi
392	Bhadohi	None	429,201	Bhadohi	Bhadohi
393	Gyanpur	None	390,971	Bhadohi	Bhadohi
394	Aurai	SC	377,692	Bhadohi	Bhadohi
395	Chhanbey	SC	374,291	Mirzapur	Mirzapur
396	Mirzapur	None	403,374	Mirzapur	Mirzapur
397	Majhawan	None	397,877	Mirzapur	Mirzapur
398	Chunar	None	354,274	Mirzapur	Mirzapur
399	Marihan	None	366,489	Mirzapur	Mirzapur
400	Ghorawal	None	394,231	Sonbhadra	Robertsganj
401	Robertsganj	None	343,485	Sonbhadra	Robertsganj
402	Obra	ST	327,556	Sonbhadra	Robertsganj
403	Duddhi	SC	332,033	Sonbhadra	Robertsganj

== See also ==
- Seventeenth Legislative Assembly of Uttar Pradesh
- Uttar Pradesh Legislative Assembly
- 2017 Uttar Pradesh Legislative Assembly election
