= 2025 Milkipur by-election =

Local election in India

2025 Mikipur by-election
← 2022	5 February 2025	2027 →

1 seat
- Turnout: 67.92% (▲7.48 pp)

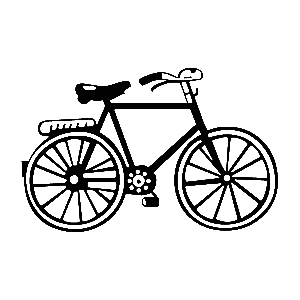
Candidate	Chandrabhanu Paswan	Ajeet Prasad
Party	BJP	SP
Popular vote	146,397	84,687
Percentage	60.17%	34.81%
MLA before election
Awadhesh Prasad (Note: Resigned in June 2024.)
SP
Elected MLA
Chandrabhanu Paswan
BJP

On 5 February 2025 a by-election was held in Milkipur Assembly constituency. The election was won by BJP candidate Chandrabhanu Paswan who defeated Samajwadi Party candidate Ajeet Prasad by a margin of 61,710 votes. The by-election occurred due to the resignation of sitting Samajwadi Party MLA Awadhesh Prasad.

== Background ==
In the 2022 legislative assembly elections, Awadhesh Pradesh, a Samajwadi Party candidate was elected to Mikipur defeating then MLA Baba Gorakhnath of the Bharatiya Janata Party by over 13,000 votes. Prasad had previously won from Milkipur in 2012 before losing in 2017. In 2024 Indian general election, Prasad narrowly won from Faizabad Lok Sabha constituency. The defeat was a major blow to the BJP as it had banked on the city's development in the general election. After winning, Prasad resigned from the legislative assembly. Due to delay in election case filed in High Court, the by-election to the constituency could not be held in 2024. On 7 January 2025, the Election Commission of India announced the schedule for the bypoll.

== Election schedule ==
The election schedule was announced by the Election Commission of India on 7 January 2025.

S.No.	Event	Date	Day
1.	Date for Nominations	10 January 2025	Friday
2.	Last Date for filing Nominations	17 January 2025	Friday
3.	Date for scrutiny of nominations	18 January 2025	Saturday
4.	Last date for withdrawal of candidatures	20 January 2025	Monday
5.	Date of poll	5 February 2025	Wednesday
6.	Date of counting	8 February 2025	Saturday

== Major Candidates ==
BJP declared Chandrabhanu Paswan as its candidate. Meanwhile, the Samajwadi Party declared Awadhesh Prasad's son Ajeet Prasad as its candidate.

No.	Party	Symbol	Candidate's Name
1	Bharatiya Janata Party		Chandrabhanu Paswan
2	Samajwadi Party		Ajeet Prasad

== Voter turnout ==
A voter turnout of 67.92% was recorded in the bypoll, which was almost 7.5% more than that of the previous election. This was despite the fact that most bypolls record lower voter turnout than general elections.

== Results ==
The Bharatiya Janata Party strongly came back in the bypoll and its candidate Chandrabhanu Paswan defeated Awadhesh Prasad's son Ajeet Prasad by over 61,710 votes. This was the highest margin of victory by a candidate in the constituency. By gaining the seat from the Samajwadi Party, BJP now gained back its ground in Ayodhya district.

=== 2025 bypoll ===
Uttar Pradesh Legislative Assembly by-election, 2025: Milkipur
Party	Candidate	Votes	%	±%
BJP	Chandrabhanu Paswan	146,397	60.17	▲17.97
SP	Ajeet Prasad	84,687	34.81	▼13.59
ASP(KR)	Santosh Kumar Chowdhary	5,459	2.24	new
NOTA	None of the Above	1,361	0.56	0.35
Majority		61,710	25.36	▲19.2
Turnout		243,317	67.92	▲7.48
BJP gain from SP		Swing	▲17.97	
