= Faizabad Lok Sabha constituency =

Lok Sabha Constituency in Uttar Pradesh, India

Coordinates: 26.77°N 82.15°E

Faizabad UP-42
- Lok Sabha constituency
- Interactive Map Outlining Faizabad Lok Sabha constituency

Constituency details
- Country: India
- Region: North India
- State: Uttar Pradesh
- Assembly constituencies: Dariyabad; Rudauli; Milkipur; Bikapur; Ayodhya
- Established: 1957
- Reservation: None

Member of Parliament
- 18th Lok Sabha
- Incumbent Awadhesh Prasad
- Party: Samajwadi Party
- Elected year: 2024

Faizabad Lok Sabha constituency is one of the 80 Lok Sabha (parliamentary) constituencies in the Indian state of Uttar Pradesh. It includes the cities of Ayodhya and Faizabad.

== Assembly segments ==
Presently, Faizabad Lok Sabha constituency comprises five state legislative assembly segments. These are:

| No | Name | District | Member | Party | 2024 Lead |
|---|---|---|---|---|---|
| 270 | Dariyabad | Barabanki | Satish Sharma | BJP | SP |
| 271 | Rudauli | Ayodhya | Ram Chandra Yadav | BJP | SP |
| 273 | Milkipur (SC) | Ayodhya | Chandrabhanu Paswan | BJP | SP |
| 274 | Bikapur | Ayodhya | Amit Singh Chauhan | BJP | SP |
| 275 | Ayodhya | Ayodhya | Ved Prakash Gupta | BJP | BJP |

== Members of Parliament ==
| Year | Member | Party |
|---|---|---|
| 1957 | Raja Ram Mishra | Indian National Congress |
| 1962 | Brij Basi Lal | Indian National Congress |
| 1967 | Ram Krishna Sinha | Indian National Congress |
| 1971 | Ram Krishna Sinha | Indian National Congress |
| 1977 | Anantram Jaiswal | Janata Party |
| 1980 | Jai Ram Varma | Indian National Congress (I) |
| 1984 | Nirmal Khatri | Indian National Congress |
| 1989 | Mitrasen Yadav | Communist Party of India |
| 1991 | Vinay Katiyar | Bharatiya Janata Party |
| 1996 | Vinay Katiyar | Bharatiya Janata Party |
| 1998 | Mitrasen Yadav | Samajwadi Party |
| 1999 | Vinay Katiyar | Bharatiya Janata Party |
| 2004 | Mitrasen Yadav | Bahujan Samaj Party |
| 2009 | Nirmal Khatri | Indian National Congress |
| 2014 | Lallu Singh | Bharatiya Janata Party |
| 2019 | Lallu Singh | Bharatiya Janata Party |
| 2024 | Awadhesh Prasad | Samajwadi Party |

== Election results ==
=== General election 2024 ===
2024 Indian general elections: Faizabad
| Party | Candidate | Votes | % | ±% |
|---|---|---|---|---|
| SP | Awadhesh Prasad | 554,289 | 48.59 | ▲5.95 |
| BJP | Lallu Singh | 499,722 | 43.81 | ▼4.85 |
| BSP | Sachidanand Pandey | 46,407 | 4.07 | ▲4.07 |
| CPI | Arvind Sen | 15,367 | 1.35 | N/A |
| NOTA | None of the Above | 7,536 | 0.66 | ▼0.2 |
| Majority | | 54,567 | 4.78 | ▼1.24 |
| Turnout | | 11,40,661 | 59.18 | ▼0.51 |
| SP gain from BJP | | Swing | ▲1.04 | |

=== General election 2019 ===
2019 Indian general elections: Faizabad
| Party | Candidate | Votes | % | ±% |
|---|---|---|---|---|
| BJP | Lallu Singh | 529,021 | 48.66 | +0.58 |
| SP | Anand Sen Yadav | 463,544 | 42.64 | +22.21 |
| INC | Dr. Nirmal Khatri | 53,386 | 4.91 | −7.79 |
| NOTA | None of the Above | 9,388 | 0.86 | −0.27 |
| Majority | | 65,477 | 6.02 | −21.63 |
| Turnout | | 10,87,420 | 59.69 | +0.87 |
| BJP hold | | Swing | +0.58 | |

=== General election 2014 ===
2014 Indian general elections: Faizabad
| Party | Candidate | Votes | % | ±% |
|---|---|---|---|---|
| BJP | Lallu Singh | 491,761 | 48.08 | +27.85 |
| SP | Mitrasen Yadav | 2,08,986 | 20.43 | −0.57 |
| BSP | Jitendra Kumar Singh (Bablu) | 1,41,827 | 13.87 | −4.24 |
| INC | Dr. Nirmal Khatri | 1,29,917 | 12.70 | −15.54 |
| ISSP | Radhika Prasad | 9,055 | 0.89 | N/A |
| NOTA | None of the Above | 11,537 | 1.13 | N/A |
| Majority | | 2,82,775 | 27.65 | +20.41 |
| Turnout | | 10,22,734 | 58.82 | +8.88 |
| BJP gain from INC | | Swing | +19.84 | |

== See also ==
- List of Constituencies of the Lok Sabha
