= Shyam Prakash =

Member of the Uttar Pradesh Legislative Assembly

Member of the Uttar Pradesh legislative assembly
- Incumbent
- Assumed office March 2022
- Constituency: Gopamau

Personal details
- Born: 17 January 1961 (age 65) Hardoi, Uttar Pradesh
- Party: Bharatiya Janata Party
- Education: Gandhi Faiz-E-Aam College
- Profession: Politician

Shyam Prakash is an Indian politician and a member of the 18th Uttar Pradesh Assembly from the Gopamau Assembly constituency of Hardoi district. He is a member of the Bharatiya Janata Party.

== Early life ==
Shyam Prakash was born on 17 January 1961 in Hardoi, Uttar Pradesh, to a Hindu family of Jhamman Lal. He married Shashi Verma, and they had three children.

== Education ==
Shyam Prakash completed his graduation at Gandhi Faiz-E-Aam College, Shahjahanpur, in 1983.

== Posts held ==
| # | From | To | Position | Ref |
|---|---|---|---|---|
| 01 | 1997 | 2002 | Member, 13th Uttar Pradesh Assembly | |
| 02 | 2002 | 2007 | Member, 14th Uttar Pradesh Assembly | |
| 02 | 2012 | 2017 | Member, 16th Uttar Pradesh Assembly | |
| 02 | 2022 | Incumbent | Member, 18th Uttar Pradesh Assembly | |

== See also ==
- 18th Uttar Pradesh Assembly
- Gopamau Assembly constituency
- Uttar Pradesh Legislative Assembly
