= Chetram =

Indian politician

Member of the Uttar Pradesh legislative assembly
- Incumbent
- Assumed office 2017
- Preceded by: Sakuntla Devi
- Constituency: Powayan
- In office 1985–1996
- Preceded by: Roop Ram
- Constituency: Powayan

Personal details
- Born: 10 July 1951 (age 74) Hasanpur, Uttar Pradesh
- Party: Bharatiya Janata Party
- Spouse: Asha Devi (m. 1977)
- Parent: Late Lalluram (father)
- Education: LL.B.
- Profession: Advocacy, Agriculture
- Source

Chetram Pasi (born 10 July 1951) is an Indian politician from Uttar Pradesh. He is a six time member of the Uttar Pradesh Legislative Assembly.

== Early life and education ==
Chetram was born in Hasanpur, Amroha district, Uttar Pradesh. He is the son of late Lalluram. He married Asha Devi in 1977 and together they have two sons, Neeraj and Anuj. He is an LLB graduate.

== Career ==
Chetram is a member of 17th Uttar Pradesh Assembly of Powayan, Uttar Pradesh of India. He represents the Powayan constituency in Shahjahanpur district representing the Bharatiya Janata Party.

He was first elected as an MLA from Powayan Assembly constituency representing the Indian National Congress winning the 1985 Uttar Pradesh Legislative Assembly election. He retained the seat for Congress in the 1989 Uttar Pradesh Legislative Assembly election. Later, he shifted to the BJP and lost the 1991 Assembly election for the same seat to Net Ram of the Indian National Congress. He later returned to the Indian National Congress and won two terms again in the 1993 Uttar Pradesh Legislative Assembly election and the 1996 Uttar Pradesh Legislative Assembly election to become a five time MLA.

In March 2017, his two sons Anuj and Neeraj were involved in a controversy for allegedly slapping a sub inspector for stopping Anuj on his bike. Both of them were booked in criminal cases.

== See also ==
- Uttar Pradesh Legislative Assembly
