= Brij Basi Lal =

Member of Parliament, 3rd Lok Sabha
- In office Apr 1962 – Mar 1967
- Preceded by: Raja Ram Misra
- Succeeded by: Ram Krishna Sinha
- Constituency: Faizabad

MLA, 2nd Assembly
- In office Apr 1957 – Mar 1962

MLA, 1st Assembly
- In office May 1952 – Mar 1957

Personal details
- Born: 9 December 1904 Village Haripur, Jalalabad, Ayodhya (Uttar Pradesh)
- Citizenship: India
- Party: Congress
- Spouse: Shrimati Shyama Devi
- Children: 3 sons and 5 daughters.
- Parent: Matabadal Lal (Father)
- Education: University of Allahabad
- Profession: Advocate & Politician
- Committees: Member of several committees

Brij Basi Lal is an Indian freedom fighter, politician and was Member of Parliament of India. He was a member of the 3rd Lok Sabha of India. Lal represented the Faizabad constituency of Uttar Pradesh and was a member of the Congress political party.

== Early life and education ==
Brij Basi Lal was born in village Haripur, Jalalabad, Ayodhya in the state of Uttar Pradesh. He attended University of Allahabad where he attained LL.B and B.Sc degrees. Lal worked as an advocate and was also a part of the Indian independence movement. He got married in 1949 and had three sons and five daughters from the marriage.

== Political career ==
=== Pre independence ===
Brij Basi Lal was an Indian freedom fighter, participated in the Indian independence movement. He was a part of the Satyagraha and Quit India movements and was imprisoned in 1941 and 1942 for participating Satyagraha and Quit India movements respectively.

=== Post independence ===
Brij Basi Lal entered active politics in early 1930s. He joined Congress party. Prior to becoming a Member of Parliament, Lal was also a member of the Uttar Pradesh Legislative Assembly. In the 3rd Lok Sabha, Lal succeeded Raja Ram Misra who was also a Congress member.

== Posts Held ==
#	From	To	Position
01	1952	1957	Member, 01st Assembly of U.P.
02	1957	1962	Member, 02nd Assembly of U.P.
03	1962	1967	MP, 03rd Lok Sabha

== See also ==
- 3rd Lok Sabha
- Lok Sabha
- Politics of India
- Parliament of India
- Government of India
- Indian National Congress
- Faizabad (Lok Sabha constituency)
- List of Indian independence activists
