= Vinay Katiyar =

Indian politician

Member of Parliament, Rajya Sabha
- In office 3 April 2006 – 2 April 2018
- Preceded by: Janeshwar Mishra
- Succeeded by: Kanta Kardam
- Constituency: Uttar Pradesh

Member of Parliament, Lok Sabha
- In office 10 October 1999 – 6 February 2004
- Preceded by: Mitrasen Yadav
- Succeeded by: Mitrasen Yadav
- Constituency: Faizabad (Ayodhya)
- In office 20 June 1991 – 10 March 1998
- Preceded by: Mitrasen Yadav
- Succeeded by: Mitrasen Yadav
- Constituency: Faizabad (Ayodhya)

Founder-President of Bajrang Dal
- In office 1984–1995
- Succeeded by: Jaibhan Singh Pawaiya

Personal details
- Born: 11 November 1954 (age 71) Kanpur, Uttar Pradesh, India
- Party: Bharatiya Janata Party
- Spouse: Ram Bethi
- Education: B.Com
- Alma mater: Vikramajit Singh Sanatan Dharma College, Kanpur University

Vinay Katiyar (born 11 November 1954) is a politician and the founder-president of Bajrang Dal, an Indian Hindutva militant organisation that serves as the youth wing of the Vishva Hindu Parishad (VHP) in India. He has served as an All India General Secretary of the Bharatiya Janata Party (BJP), and as a Member of Parliament in both the Lok Sabha and the Rajya Sabha.

== Life and career ==
Katiyar was born in a Kurmi family to Devi Charan Katiyar and Shyam Kali in Kanpur. He holds a bachelor's degree in commerce from Kanpur University.

Katiyar started his political journey with Akhil Bharatiya Vidyarthi Parishad (ABVP), the student wing of the Sangh Parivar. He was the organizing secretary of ABVP's Uttar Pradesh state unit from 1970 to 1974, and the convener of the Jayaprakash Narayan's Bihar Movement in 1974. He became a pracharak (full-time worker) of the Rashtriya Swayamsevak Sangh (RSS) in 1980. He founded the Hindu Jagran Manch in 1982. In 1984, he was chosen to start the new youth organisation Bajrang Dal to support the Ram Janmabhoomi movement.

Later, Katiyar served as the President of Uttar Pradesh State Unit of the Bharatiya Janata Party from 2002 to 18 July 2004 and the national General Secretary of the BJP from 2006.

Katiyar was elected to the Lok Sabha from the Ayodhya (Lok Sabha constituency) to the 10th, 11th and 13th Lok Sabha in 1991, 1996 and 1999, and to the Rajya Sabha as a representative of Uttar Pradesh in 2012.

== Controversies ==
In a 2018 interview with ANI, Katiyar said that there was no need for Muslims to remain in India in the wake of its Partition, and that Muslims in India should, instead, move to Pakistan or Bangladesh. These views were shared after his comments about the Taj Mahal, claiming that the monument was a Hindu temple in the period of Aurangzeb's rule and implied that it would soon be returned to its 'original state' through its destruction.
