= Lallu Singh =

Indian politician (born 1954)

Member of Parliament, Lok Sabha
- In office 16 May 2014 – 4 June 2024
- Preceded by: Nirmal Khatri
- Succeeded by: Awadhesh Prasad
- Constituency: Faizabad

Minister of State Government of Uttar Pradesh
- In office 1997–2002
- Governor: Romesh Bhandari; Suraj Bhan; Vishnu Kant Shastri
- Ministry & Department's: Tourism; Power; Energy
- Chief Minister: Kalyan Singh; Ram Prakash Gupta; Rajnath Singh

Member of Uttar Pradesh Legislative Assembly
- In office 1991–2012
- Preceded by: Jai Shankar Pandey
- Succeeded by: Tej Narayan Pandey
- Constituency: Ayodhya

Personal details
- Born: 1 November 1954 (age 71) Ayodhya, Uttar Pradesh, India
- Party: Bharatiya Janata Party
- Spouse: Sarita Singh (m. 1982)
- Children: 4
- Parents: Bhagwan Singh (father); Sundra Devi (mother)
- Education: M.A.LLB
- Alma mater: Dr. Ram Manohar Lohia Avadh University
- Occupation: Agriculturist; politician
- As of 20 January, 2022

Lallu Singh (born 1 November 1954) is a member of the Bharatiya Janata Party and has won the 2014 Indian general elections and again in the 2019 Lok Sabha election from the Ayodhya (Lok Sabha constituency). He lost to Samajwadi Party's Awadhesh Prasad in the 2024 Lok Sabha Election.

== Early life and education ==
Lallu Singh was born on 1 November 1954 to Shri Bhagwan Singh and Smt Sundera Devi. He was born in a village named Raipur near Ayodhya city, which is located in Ayodhya district in Uttar Pradesh.

== Political career ==
- 1991–2012: Member of Uttar Pradesh Vidhan Sabha (five terms 1991, 1993, 1996, 2002, 2007) from Ayodhya constituency
- May 2014: Elected to the 16th Lok Sabha. He also won the election on 23 May 2019 and became member of parliament.
- May 2024: Singh lost to Awadhesh Prasad (SP) from Faizabad Lok Sabha constituency by a margin of 55,935 votes.
