= 2027 Uttar Pradesh Legislative Assembly election =

Elections for the 19th Legislative assembly of Uttar Pradesh

- By February – March 2027

All 403 elected seats in the Uttar Pradesh Legislative Assembly 202 seats needed for a majority

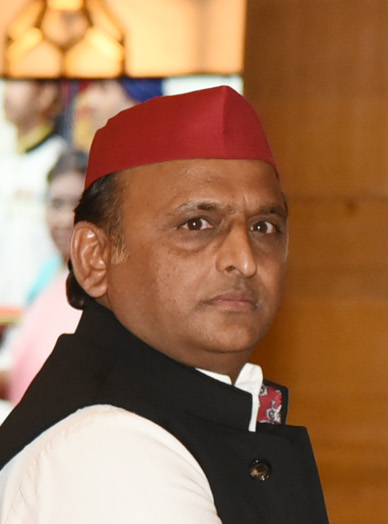
Leader	Yogi Adityanath	Akhilesh Yadav
Party	BJP	SP
Alliance	NDA	INDIA
Leader since	2017	2012
Leader's seat	Gorakhpur Urban	TBA
Last election	41.29%, 255 seats	32.06%, 111 seats
Current seats	258	101
- Map of the assembly constituencies in Uttar Pradesh
Incumbent Chief Minister
Yogi Adityanath
BJP

Legislative assembly elections are expected to be held in Uttar Pradesh in February – March 2027 to elect all 403 members of the Uttar Pradesh Legislative Assembly. Yogi Adityanath is the incumbent Chief Minister of Uttar Pradesh.

== Schedule ==
Poll Event	Schedule
Notification Date	TBD
Last Date for filing nomination	TBD
Scrutiny of nomination	TBD
Last Date for Withdrawal of nomination	TBD
Date of Poll	TBD
Date of Counting of Votes	TBD

== Parties and Alliances ==
=== National Democratic Alliance ===
National Democratic Alliance
Party	Flag	Symbol	Leader	Seats contested
Bharatiya Janata Party			Yogi Adityanath	9 (Announced)
Rashtriya Lok Dal			Jayant Chaudhary	3 (Announced)
Apna Dal (Sonelal)			Anupriya Patel	
Suheldev Bharatiya Samaj Party			Om Prakash Rajbhar	1 (Announced)
NISHAD Party			Sanjay Nishad	
Total				

=== Indian National Developmental Inclusive Alliance ===
Indian National Developmental Inclusive Alliance
Party	Flag	Symbol	Leader	Seats contested
Samajwadi Party			Akhilesh Yadav	2 (Announced)
Indian National Congress			Aradhana Mishra	3 (Announced)
Jan Adhikar Party			Babu Singh Kushwaha	
Apna Dal (Kamerawadi)			Pallavi Patel	1 (Announced)
Janvadi Party (Socialist)			Sanjay Chauhan	
Lok Dal			Chaudhary Sunil Singh	
Apni Janata Party			Swami Prasad Maurya	
Total				

=== Samajik Parivartan Morcha ===
Samajik Parivartan Morcha
Party	Flag	Symbol	Leader	Seats contested
Aazad Samaj Party			Chandrashekhar Azad	
All India Majlis-e-Ittehadul Muslimeen			Shaukat Ali	1 (Announced)
Total				

=== Others ===
Party	Flag	Symbol	Leader	Seats contested
Bahujan Samaj Party			Mayawati	23 (Announced)
Aam Aadmi Party			Sanjay Singh	
Jansatta Dal (Loktantrik)			Raghuraj Pratap Singh	
Janata Dal (United)				
Lok Janshakti Party (Ram Vilas)				
Vikassheel Insaan Party				
Communist Party of India				
Communist Party of India (Marxist)				
Communist Party of India (Marxist–Leninist) Liberation				

== Candidates ==
District	Constituency		NDA		INDIA		BSP		SPM	
District	#	Name	Party	Candidate	Party	Candidate	Party	Candidate	Party	Candidate
Saharanpur	1	Behat								
Saharanpur	2	Nakur								
Saharanpur	3	Saharanpur Nagar					BSP	Naresh Kumar Saini		
Saharanpur	4	Saharanpur					BSP	Firoz Aftab		
Saharanpur	5	Deoband								
Saharanpur	6	Rampur Maniharan (SC)								
Saharanpur	7	Gangoh								
Shamli	8	Kairana								
Shamli	9	Thana Bhawan								
Shamli	10	Shamli								
Muzaffarnagar	11	Budhana	RLD	Rajpal baliyan						
Muzaffarnagar	12	Charthawal								
Muzaffarnagar	13	Purqazi (SC)	RLD	Anil Kumar						
Muzaffarnagar	14	Muzaffarnagar								
Muzaffarnagar	15	Khatauli								
Muzaffarnagar	16	Meerapur								
Bijnor	17	Najibabad								
Bijnor	18	Nagina (SC)								
Bijnor	19	Barhapur					BSP	Tanya Nagpal		
Bijnor	20	Dhampur								
Bijnor	21	Nehtaur (SC)								
Bijnor	22	Bijnor								
Bijnor	23	Chandpur								
Bijnor	24	Noorpur								
Moradabad	25	Kanth								
Moradabad	26	Thakurdwara								
Moradabad	27	Moradabad Rural								
Moradabad	28	Moradabad Nagar								
Moradabad	29	Kundarki								
Moradabad	30	Bilari								
Sambhal	31	Chandausi (SC)	BJP	Gulab Devi						
Sambhal	32	Asmoli								
Sambhal	33	Sambhal								
Rampur	34	Suar								
Rampur	35	Chamraua								
Rampur	36	Bilaspur	BJP	Baldev Singh Aulakh						
Rampur	37	Rampur								
Rampur	38	Milak (SC)								
Amroha	39	Dhanaura (SC)								
Amroha	40	Naugawan Sadat								
Amroha	41	Amroha								
Amroha	42	Hasanpur								
Meerut	43	Siwalkhas								
Meerut	44	Sardhana					BSP	Vineet Bharala		
Meerut	45	Hastinapur (SC)								
Meerut	46	Kithore								
Meerut	47	Meerut Cantt.								
Meerut	48	Meerut								
Meerut	49	Meerut South								
Bagpat	50	Chhaprauli	RLD	Ajay Kumar						
Bagpat	51	Baraut								
Bagpat	52	Bagpat								
Ghaziabad	53	Loni								
Ghaziabad	54	Muradnagar								
Ghaziabad	55	Sahibabad								
Ghaziabad	56	Ghaziabad								
Ghaziabad	57	Modinagar								
Hapur	58	Dhaulana								
Hapur	59	Hapur (SC)								
Hapur	60	Garhmukteshwar								
Gautam Buddh Nagar	61	Noida								
Gautam Buddh Nagar	62	Dadri								
Gautam Buddh Nagar	63	Jewar								
Bulandshahr	64	Sikandrabad								
Bulandshahr	65	Bulandshahr								
Bulandshahr	66	Syana								
Bulandshahr	67	Anupshahr								
Bulandshahr	68	Debai								
Bulandshahr	69	Shikarpur								
Bulandshahr	70	Khurja (SC)								
Aligarh	71	Khair (SC)								
Aligarh	72	Barauli								
Aligarh	73	Atrauli								
Aligarh	74	Chharra								
Aligarh	75	Koil								
Aligarh	76	Aligarh								
Aligarh	77	Iglas (SC)								
Hathras	78	Hathras (SC)								
Hathras	79	Sadabad					BSP	Avin Sharma		
Hathras	80	Sikandra Rao								
Mathura	81	Chhata								
Mathura	82	Mant								
Mathura	83	Goverdhan								
Mathura	84	Mathura								
Mathura	85	Baldev (SC)								
Agra	86	Etmadpur					BSP	Sarvesh Baghel		
Agra	87	Agra Cantt. (SC)								
Agra	88	Agra South								
Agra	89	Agra North								
Agra	90	Agra Rural (SC)								
Agra	91	Fatehpur Sikri								
Agra	92	Kheragarh								
Agra	93	Fatehabad								
Agra	94	Bah								
Firozabad	95	Tundla (SC)								
Firozabad	96	Jasrana								
Firozabad	97	Firozabad								
Firozabad	98	Shikohabad								
Firozabad	99	Sirsaganj								
Kasganj	100	Kasganj								
Kasganj	101	Amanpur								
Kasganj	102	Patiyali								
Etah	103	Aliganj								
Etah	104	Etah								
Etah	105	Marhara								
Etah	106	Jalesar (SC)								
Mainpuri	107	Mainpuri								
Mainpuri	108	Bhongaon								
Mainpuri	109	Kishni (SC)								
Mainpuri	110	Karhal								
Sambhal	111	Gunnaur								
Budaun	112	Bisauli (SC)								
Budaun	113	Sahaswan								
Budaun	114	Bilsi								
Budaun	115	Badaun								
Budaun	116	Shekhupur								
Budaun	117	Dataganj								
Bareilly	118	Baheri								
Bareilly	119	Meerganj								
Bareilly	120	Bhojipura								
Bareilly	121	Nawabganj								
Bareilly	122	Faridpur (SC)								
Bareilly	123	Bithari Chainpur								
Bareilly	124	Bareilly								
Bareilly	125	Bareilly Cantt.								
Bareilly	126	Aonla								
Pilibhit	127	Pilibhit								
Pilibhit	128	Barkhera								
Pilibhit	129	Puranpur (SC)								
Pilibhit	130	Bisalpur								
Shahjahanpur	131	Katra								
Shahjahanpur	132	Jalalabad								
Shahjahanpur	133	Tilhar								
Shahjahanpur	134	Powayan (SC)								
Shahjahanpur	135	Shahjahanpur	BJP	Suresh Kumar Khanna	SP		BSP			
Shahjahanpur	136	Dadraul								
Lakhimpur Kheri	137	Palia								
Lakhimpur Kheri	138	Nighasan								
Lakhimpur Kheri	139	Gola Gokrannath								
Lakhimpur Kheri	140	Sri Nagar (SC)								
Lakhimpur Kheri	141	Dhaurahra								
Lakhimpur Kheri	142	Lakhimpur								
Lakhimpur Kheri	143	Kasta (SC)								
Lakhimpur Kheri	144	Mohammdi								
Sitapur	145	Maholi								
Sitapur	146	Sitapur								
Sitapur	147	Hargaon (SC)								
Sitapur	148	Laharpur								
Sitapur	149	Biswan								
Sitapur	150	Sevata								
Sitapur	151	Mahmoodabad								
Sitapur	152	Sidhauli (SC)								
Sitapur	153	Misrikh (SC)								
Hardoi	154	Sawayazpur								
Hardoi	155	Shahabad								
Hardoi	156	Hardoi								
Hardoi	157	Gopamau (SC)								
Hardoi	158	Sandi (SC)								
Hardoi	159	Bilgram-Mallanwan								
Hardoi	160	Balamau (SC)								
Hardoi	161	Sandila					BSP	Abdul Mannan		
Unnao	162	Bangarmau								
Unnao	163	Safipur (SC)								
Unnao	164	Mohan (SC)								
Unnao	165	Unnao								
Unnao	166	Bhagwantnagar								
Unnao	167	Purwa								
Lucknow	168	Malihabad (SC)								
Lucknow	169	Bakshi Kaa Talab								
Lucknow	170	Sarojini Nagar								
Lucknow	171	Lucknow West								
Lucknow	172	Lucknow North								
Lucknow	173	Lucknow East								
Lucknow	174	Lucknow Central								
Lucknow	175	Lucknow Cantonment	BJP	Brajesh Pathak						
Lucknow	176	Mohanlalganj (SC)								
Raebareli	177	Bachhrawan (SC)								
Amethi	178	Tiloi								
Raebareli	179	Harchandpur								
Raebareli	180	Raebareli								
Raebareli	181	Salon (SC)								
Raebareli	182	Sareni								
Raebareli	183	Unchahar								
Amethi	184	Jagdishpur (SC)								
Amethi	185	Gauriganj								
Amethi	186	Amethi								
Sultanpur	187	Isauli								
Sultanpur	188	Sultanpur					BSP	Imtiyaz Ahmed Bhutto		
Sultanpur	189	Sadar					BSP	Madhu lata Verma		
Sultanpur	190	Lambhua					BSP	Shailendra Kumar Singh		
Sultanpur	191	Kadipur (SC)								
Farrukhabad	192	Kaimganj (SC)								
Farrukhabad	193	Amritpur								
Farrukhabad	194	Farrukhabad								
Farrukhabad	195	Bhojpur								
Kannauj	196	Chhibramau								
Kannauj	197	Tirwa								
Kannauj	198	Kannauj (SC)								
Etawah	199	Jaswantnagar			SP	Shivpal Singh Yadav				
Etawah	200	Etawah								
Etawah	201	Bharthana (SC)								
Auraiya	202	Bidhuna								
Auraiya	203	Dibiyapur								
Auraiya	204	Auraiya (SC)								
Kanpur Dehat	205	Rasulabad (SC)								
Kanpur Dehat	206	Akbarpur-Raniya								
Kanpur Dehat	207	Sikandra								
Kanpur Dehat	208	Bhognipur								
Kanpur Nagar	209	Bilhaur (SC)								
Kanpur Nagar	210	Bithoor								
Kanpur Nagar	211	Kalyanpur								
Kanpur Nagar	212	Govind Nagar								
Kanpur Nagar	213	Sishamau								
Kanpur Nagar	214	Arya Nagar								
Kanpur Nagar	215	Kidwai Nagar								
Kanpur Nagar	216	Kanpur Cantonment								
Kanpur Nagar	217	Maharajpur	BJP	Satish Mahana						
Kanpur Nagar	218	Ghatampur (SC)								
Jalaun	219	Madhogarh					BSP	Ashish Pandey		
Jalaun	220	Kalpi								
Jalaun	221	Orai (SC)								
Jhansi	222	Babina								
Jhansi	223	Jhansi Nagar								
Jhansi	224	Mauranipur (SC)								
Jhansi	225	Garautha								
Lalitpur	226	Lalitpur								
Lalitpur	227	Mehroni (SC)								
Hamirpur	228	Hamirpur								
Hamirpur	229	Rath (SC)								
Mahoba	230	Mahoba								
Mahoba	231	Charkhari								
Banda	232	Tindwari								
Banda	233	Baberu								
Banda	234	Naraini (SC)								
Banda	235	Banda								
Chitrakoot	236	Chitrakoot								
Chitrakoot	237	Manikpur								
Fatehpur	238	Jahanabad								
Fatehpur	239	Bindki					BSP	Anil Kumar Tiwari		
Fatehpur	240	Fatehpur								
Fatehpur	241	Ayah Shah								
Fatehpur	242	Husainganj								
Fatehpur	243	Khaga (SC)								
Pratapgarh	244	Rampur Khas			INC	Aradhana Mishra				
Pratapgarh	245	Babaganj (SC)								
Pratapgarh	246	Kunda								
Pratapgarh	247	Vishwanathganj								
Pratapgarh	248	Pratapgarh								
Pratapgarh	249	Patti								
Pratapgarh	250	Raniganj								
Kaushambi	251	Sirathu			AD(K)	Pallavi Patel				
Kaushambi	252	Manjhanpur (SC)								
Kaushambi	253	Chail	BJP	Pooja Pal						
Prayagraj	254	Phaphamau								
Prayagraj	255	Soraon (SC)								
Prayagraj	256	Phulpur								
Prayagraj	257	Pratappur								
Prayagraj	258	Handia								
Prayagraj	259	Meja								
Prayagraj	260	Karachhana								
Prayagraj	261	Prayagraj West								
Prayagraj	262	Prayagraj North								
Prayagraj	263	Prayagraj South								
Prayagraj	264	Bara (SC)								
Prayagraj	265	Koraon (SC)								
Barabanki	266	Kursi								
Barabanki	267	Ram Nagar								
Barabanki	268	Barabanki					BSP	Mohammad Mubashshir		
Barabanki	269	Zaidpur (SC)								
Barabanki	270	Dariyabad								
Ayodhya	271	Rudauli								
Barabanki	272	Haidergarh (SC)								
Ayodhya	273	Milkipur (SC)	BJP	Chandrabhanu Paswan						
Ayodhya	274	Bikapur					BSP	Jitendra Singh Bablu		
Ayodhya	275	Ayodhya			SP	Pawan Pandey				
Ayodhya	276	Goshainganj								
Ambedkar Nagar	277	Katehari					BSP	Maruti Mishra		
Ambedkar Nagar	278	Tanda								
Ambedkar Nagar	279	Alapur (SC)					BSP	Keshradevi Gautam		
Ambedkar Nagar	280	Jalalpur					BSP	Dayaram Rajbhar		
Ambedkar Nagar	281	Akbarpur					BSP	Manoj Kumar Verma		
Bahraich	282	Balha (SC)								
Bahraich	283	Nanpara								
Bahraich	284	Matera							AIMIM	Shaukat Ali
Bahraich	285	Mahasi								
Bahraich	286	Bahraich								
Bahraich	287	Payagpur								
Bahraich	288	Kaiserganj								
Shravasti	289	Bhinga								
Shravasti	290	Shrawasti								
Balrampur	291	Tulsipur								
Balrampur	292	Gainsari								
Balrampur	293	Utraula								
Balrampur	294	Balrampur (SC)								
Gonda	295	Mehnaun								
Gonda	296	Gonda	BJP	Prateek Bhushan Singh						
Gonda	297	Katra Bazar								
Gonda	298	Colonelganj								
Gonda	299	Tarabganj								
Gonda	300	Mankapur (SC)								
Gonda	301	Gaura								
Siddharthnagar	302	Shohratgarh								
Siddharthnagar	303	Kapilvastu (SC)								
Siddharthnagar	304	Bansi								
Siddharthnagar	305	Itwa								
Siddharthnagar	306	Domariyaganj								
Basti	307	Harraiya								
Basti	308	Kaptanganj								
Basti	309	Rudhauli								
Basti	310	Basti Sadar								
Basti	311	Mahadewa (SC)								
Sant Kabir Nagar	312	Menhdawal								
Sant Kabir Nagar	313	Khalilabad								
Sant Kabir Nagar	314	Dhanghata (SC)								
Maharajganj	315	Pharenda			INC	Virendra Chaudhary				
Maharajganj	316	Nautanwa								
Maharajganj	317	Siswa								
Maharajganj	318	Maharajganj (SC)								
Maharajganj	319	Paniyara								
Gorakhpur	320	Caimpiyarganj								
Gorakhpur	321	Pipraich								
Gorakhpur	322	Gorakhpur Urban	BJP	Yogi Adityanath						
Gorakhpur	323	Gorakhpur Rural								
Gorakhpur	324	Sahajanwa								
Gorakhpur	325	Khajani (SC)								
Gorakhpur	326	Chauri-Chaura								
Gorakhpur	327	Bansgaon (SC)								
Gorakhpur	328	Chillupar								
Kushinagar	329	Khadda								
Kushinagar	330	Padrauna								
Kushinagar	331	Tamkuhi Raj								
Kushinagar	332	Fazilnagar								
Kushinagar	333	Kushinagar								
Kushinagar	334	Hata								
Kushinagar	335	Ramkola (SC)								
Deoria	336	Rudrapur								
Deoria	337	Deoria								
Deoria	338	Pathardeva								
Deoria	339	Rampur Karkhana								
Deoria	340	Bhatpar Rani								
Deoria	341	Salempur (SC)								
Deoria	342	Barhaj								
Azamgarh	343	Atrauliya	SBSP	Arun Rajbhar						
Azamgarh	344	Gopalpur								
Azamgarh	345	Sagri					BSP	Vijay Pratap Yadav		
Azamgarh	346	Mubarakpur								
Azamgarh	347	Azamgarh								
Azamgarh	348	Nizamabad								
Azamgarh	349	Phoolpur Pawai					BSP	Abul Qais Azmi		
Azamgarh	350	Didarganj					BSP	Dinesh Chandra		
Azamgarh	351	Lalganj (SC)								
Azamgarh	352	Mehnagar (SC)								
Mau	353	Madhuban								
Mau	354	Ghosi								
Mau	355	Muhammadabad-Gohna (SC)								
Mau	356	Mau								
Ballia	357	Belthara Road (SC)								
Ballia	358	Rasara								
Ballia	359	Sikanderpur								
Ballia	360	Phephana								
Ballia	361	Ballia Nagar								
Ballia	362	Bansdih								
Ballia	363	Bairia								
Jaunpur	364	Badlapur								
Jaunpur	365	Shahganj								
Jaunpur	366	Jaunpur								
Jaunpur	367	Malhani								
Jaunpur	368	Mungra Badshahpur					BSP	Vinod Mishra		
Jaunpur	369	Machhlishahr (SC)								
Jaunpur	370	Mariyahu								
Jaunpur	371	Zafrabad								
Jaunpur	372	Kerakat (SC)								
Ghazipur	373	Jakhanian (SC)								
Ghazipur	374	Saidpur (SC)								
Ghazipur	375	Ghazipur Sadar								
Ghazipur	376	Jangipur								
Ghazipur	377	Zahoorabad					BSP	Manoj Rajbhar		
Ghazipur	378	Mohammadabad								
Ghazipur	379	Zamania								
Chandauli	380	Mughalsarai								
Chandauli	381	Sakaldiha								
Chandauli	382	Saiyadraja								
Chandauli	383	Chakia (SC)								
Varanasi	384	Pindra			INC	Ajay Rai				
Varanasi	385	Ajagara (SC)								
Varanasi	386	Shivpur								
Varanasi	387	Rohaniya								
Varanasi	388	Varanasi North								
Varanasi	389	Varanasi South								
Varanasi	390	Varanasi Cantt.								
Varanasi	391	Sevapuri								
Bhadohi	392	Bhadohi								
Bhadohi	393	Gyanpur								
Bhadohi	394	Aurai (SC)								
Mirzapur	395	Chhanbey (SC)								
Mirzapur	396	Mirzapur								
Mirzapur	397	Majhawan								
Mirzapur	398	Chunar								
Mirzapur	399	Marihan								
Sonbhadra	400	Ghorawal								
Sonbhadra	401	Robertsganj								
Sonbhadra	402	Obra (ST)								
Sonbhadra	403	Duddhi (ST)								

== Surveys and polls ==
=== Opinion polls ===
Seat Projections
Date published	Polling agency	Sample size	Margin of Error					Lead	Ref
Date published	Polling agency	Sample size	Margin of Error	NDA	INDIA	BSP	Others	Lead	Ref
29 September 2026	Matrize	—	—	267	132	2	2	135	
13 September 2026	Spick Media	—	—	193	156	0	0	Hung	
10 September 2026	Survey Sarva	—	—	179–189	209–219	0	0	30	
23 April 2026	Dainik Bhaskar	6 Lakhs +	—	264	137	1	1	127	

Vote Share Projections
Date published	Polling agency	Sample size	Margin of Error					Lead	Ref
Date published	Polling agency	Sample size	Margin of Error	NDA	INDIA	BSP	Others	Lead	Ref
29 September 2026	Matrize	—	—	44%	38%	0.8%	10%	6%	
13 September 2026	Spick Media	—	—	42.13%	39.73%	10.96%	7.18%	2.4%	
10 September 2026	Survey Sarva	—	—	38.7%	40.8%	—	—	2.1%	
25 August 2026	Vote Vibe	—	—	41.8%	38.7%	5.2%	4%	3.1%	

=== Exit polls ===
Exit polls
Polling agency	Date published	Sample size	Margin of Error					Lead
Polling agency	Date published	Sample size	Margin of Error	NDA	INDIA	BSP	Others	Lead

== Results ==
=== Results by alliance or party ===
Alliance/ Party		Popular vote			Seats		
Alliance/ Party		Votes	%	±pp	Contested	Won	+/−
NDA	BJP						
NDA	NISHAD						
NDA	AD(S)						
NDA	RLD						
NDA	SBSP						
NDA	Total						
INDIA	SP						
INDIA	INC						
INDIA	JAP						
INDIA	AD(K)						
INDIA	JP(S)						
INDIA	LD						
INDIA	AJP						
INDIA	Total						
SPM	ASP(KR)						
SPM	AIMIM						
SPM	Total						
BSP							
Others							
IND							
NOTA							
Total			100%	—		403	—

=== Results by division ===
Division	Seats					
Division	Seats	NDA	INDIA	SPM	BSP	OTH
Saharanpur	16					
Moradabad	27					
Bareilly	25					
Lucknow	46					
Devipatan	20					
Basti	13					
Gorakhpur	28					
Meerut	28					
Aligarh	17					
Agra	23					
Kanpur	27					
Ayodhya	25					
Azamgarh	21					
Jhansi	9					
Chitrakoot	10					
Prayagraj	28					
Varanasi	28					
Vindhyachal	12					
Total	403					

=== Results by district ===
District	Seats					
District	Seats	NDA	INDIA	SPM	BSP	OTH
Saharanpur	7					
Shamli	3					
Muzaffarnagar	6					
Bijnor	8					
Moradabad	6					
Sambhal	4					
Rampur	5					
Amroha	4					
Meerut	7					
Baghpat	3					
Ghaziabad	5					
Hapur	3					
G. B. Nagar	3					
Bulandshahr	7					
Aligarh	7					
Kasganj	3					
Etah	4					
Hathras	3					
Mathura	5					
Agra	9					
Firozabad	5					
Mainpuri	4					
Budaun	6					
Bareilly	9					
Pilibhit	4					
Shahjahanpur	6					
Lakhimpur Kheri	8					
Sitapur	9					
Hardoi	8					
Unnao	6					
Lucknow	9					
Raebareli	6					
Amethi	4					
Sultanpur	5					
Barabanki	6					
Ayodhya	5					
Ambedkar Nagar	5					
Farrukhabad	4					
Kannauj	3					
Etawah	3					
Auraiya	3					
Kanpur Dehat	4					
Kanpur Nagar	10					
Jalaun	3					
Jhansi	4					
Lalitpur	2					
Hamirpur	2					
Mahoba	2					
Banda	4					
Chitrakoot	2					
Fatehpur	6					
Pratapgarh	7					
Kaushambi	3					
Prayagraj	12					
Bahraich	7					
Shrawasti	2					
Balrampur	4					
Gonda	7					
Siddharthnagar	5					
Basti	5					
Sant Kabir Nagar	3					
Maharajganj	5					
Gorakhpur	9					
Kushinagar	7					
Deoria	7					
Azamgarh	10					
Mau	4					
Ballia	7					
Jaunpur	9					
Ghazipur	7					
Chandauli	4					
Varanasi	8					
Bhadohi	3					
Mirzapur	5					
Sonbhadra	4					
Total	403					

=== Results by constituency ===
District	Constituency		Winner				Runner Up				Margin
District	No.	Name	Candidate	Party	Votes	%	Candidate	Party	Votes	%	Margin
Saharanpur	1	Behat									
Saharanpur	2	Nakur									
Saharanpur	3	Saharanpur Nagar									
Saharanpur	4	Saharanpur									
Saharanpur	5	Deoband									
Saharanpur	6	Rampur Maniharan (SC)									
Saharanpur	7	Gangoh									
Shamli	8	Kairana									
Shamli	9	Thana Bhawan									
Shamli	10	Shamli									
Muzaffarnagar	11	Budhana									
Muzaffarnagar	12	Charthawal									
Muzaffarnagar	13	Purqazi (SC)									
Muzaffarnagar	14	Muzaffarnagar									
Muzaffarnagar	15	Khatauli									
Muzaffarnagar	16	Meerapur									
Bijnor	17	Najibabad									
Bijnor	18	Nagina (SC)									
Bijnor	19	Barhapur									
Bijnor	20	Dhampur									
Bijnor	21	Nehtaur (SC)									
Bijnor	22	Bijnor									
Bijnor	23	Chandpur									
Bijnor	24	Noorpur									
Moradabad	25	Kanth									
Moradabad	26	Thakurdwara									
Moradabad	27	Moradabad Rural									
Moradabad	28	Moradabad Nagar									
Moradabad	29	Kundarki									
Moradabad	30	Bilari									
Sambhal	31	Chandausi (SC)									
Sambhal	32	Asmoli									
Sambhal	33	Sambhal									
Rampur	34	Suar									
Rampur	35	Chamraua									
Rampur	36	Bilaspur									
Rampur	37	Rampur									
Rampur	38	Milak (SC)									
Amroha	39	Dhanaura (SC)									
Amroha	40	Naugawan Sadat									
Amroha	41	Amroha									
Amroha	42	Hasanpur									
Meerut	43	Siwalkhas									
Meerut	44	Sardhana									
Meerut	45	Hastinapur (SC)									
Meerut	46	Kithore									
Meerut	47	Meerut Cantt.									
Meerut	48	Meerut									
Meerut	49	Meerut South									
Bagpat	50	Chhaprauli									
Bagpat	51	Baraut									
Bagpat	52	Bagpat									
Ghaziabad	53	Loni									
Ghaziabad	54	Muradnagar									
Ghaziabad	55	Sahibabad									
Ghaziabad	56	Ghaziabad									
Ghaziabad	57	Modinagar									
Hapur	58	Dhaulana									
Hapur	59	Hapur (SC)									
Hapur	60	Garhmukteshwar									
Gautam Buddh Nagar	61	Noida									
Gautam Buddh Nagar	62	Dadri									
Gautam Buddh Nagar	63	Jewar									
Bulandshahr	64	Sikandrabad									
Bulandshahr	65	Bulandshahr									
Bulandshahr	66	Syana									
Bulandshahr	67	Anupshahr									
Bulandshahr	68	Debai									
Bulandshahr	69	Shikarpur									
Bulandshahr	70	Khurja (SC)									
Aligarh	71	Khair (SC)									
Aligarh	72	Barauli									
Aligarh	73	Atrauli									
Aligarh	74	Chharra									
Aligarh	75	Koil									
Aligarh	76	Aligarh									
Aligarh	77	Iglas (SC)									
Hathras	78	Hathras (SC)									
Hathras	79	Sadabad									
Hathras	80	Sikandra Rao									
Mathura	81	Chhata									
Mathura	82	Mant									
Mathura	83	Goverdhan									
Mathura	84	Mathura									
Mathura	85	Baldev (SC)									
Agra	86	Etmadpur									
Agra	87	Agra Cantt. (SC)									
Agra	88	Agra South									
Agra	89	Agra North									
Agra	90	Agra Rural (SC)									
Agra	91	Fatehpur Sikri									
Agra	92	Kheragarh									
Agra	93	Fatehabad									
Agra	94	Bah									
Firozabad	95	Tundla (SC)									
Firozabad	96	Jasrana									
Firozabad	97	Firozabad									
Firozabad	98	Shikohabad									
Firozabad	99	Sirsaganj									
Kasganj	100	Kasganj									
Kasganj	101	Amanpur									
Kasganj	102	Patiyali									
Etah	103	Aliganj									
Etah	104	Etah									
Etah	105	Marhara									
Etah	106	Jalesar (SC)									
Mainpuri	107	Mainpuri									
Mainpuri	108	Bhongaon									
Mainpuri	109	Kishni (SC)									
Mainpuri	110	Karhal									
Sambhal	111	Gunnaur									
Budaun	112	Bisauli (SC)									
Budaun	113	Sahaswan									
Budaun	114	Bilsi									
Budaun	115	Badaun									
Budaun	116	Shekhupur									
Budaun	117	Dataganj									
Bareilly	118	Baheri									
Bareilly	119	Meerganj									
Bareilly	120	Bhojipura									
Bareilly	121	Nawabganj									
Bareilly	122	Faridpur (SC)									
Bareilly	123	Bithari Chainpur									
Bareilly	124	Bareilly									
Bareilly	125	Bareilly Cantt.									
Bareilly	126	Aonla									
Pilibhit	127	Pilibhit									
Pilibhit	128	Barkhera									
Pilibhit	129	Puranpur (SC)									
Pilibhit	130	Bisalpur									
Shahjahanpur	131	Katra									
Shahjahanpur	132	Jalalabad									
Shahjahanpur	133	Tilhar									
Shahjahanpur	134	Powayan (SC)									
Shahjahanpur	135	Shahjahanpur									
Shahjahanpur	136	Dadraul									
Lakhimpur Kheri	137	Palia									
Lakhimpur Kheri	138	Nighasan									
Lakhimpur Kheri	139	Gola Gokrannath									
Lakhimpur Kheri	140	Sri Nagar (SC)									
Lakhimpur Kheri	141	Dhaurahra									
Lakhimpur Kheri	142	Lakhimpur									
Lakhimpur Kheri	143	Kasta (SC)									
Lakhimpur Kheri	144	Mohammdi									
Sitapur	145	Maholi									
Sitapur	146	Sitapur									
Sitapur	147	Hargaon (SC)									
Sitapur	148	Laharpur									
Sitapur	149	Biswan									
Sitapur	150	Sevata									
Sitapur	151	Mahmoodabad									
Sitapur	152	Sidhauli (SC)									
Sitapur	153	Misrikh (SC)									
Hardoi	154	Sawayazpur									
Hardoi	155	Shahabad									
Hardoi	156	Hardoi									
Hardoi	157	Gopamau (SC)									
Hardoi	158	Sandi (SC)									
Hardoi	159	Bilgram-Mallanwan									
Hardoi	160	Balamau (SC)									
Hardoi	161	Sandila									
Unnao	162	Bangarmau									
Unnao	163	Safipur (SC)									
Unnao	164	Mohan (SC)									
Unnao	165	Unnao									
Unnao	166	Bhagwantnagar									
Unnao	167	Purwa									
Lucknow	168	Malihabad (SC)									
Lucknow	169	Bakshi Kaa Talab									
Lucknow	170	Sarojini Nagar									
Lucknow	171	Lucknow West									
Lucknow	172	Lucknow North									
Lucknow	173	Lucknow East									
Lucknow	174	Lucknow Central									
Lucknow	175	Lucknow Cantonment									
Lucknow	176	Mohanlalganj (SC)									
Raebareli	177	Bachhrawan (SC)									
Amethi	178	Tiloi									
Raebareli	179	Harchandpur									
Raebareli	180	Raebareli									
Raebareli	181	Salon (SC)									
Raebareli	182	Sareni									
Raebareli	183	Unchahar									
Amethi	184	Jagdishpur (SC)									
Amethi	185	Gauriganj									
Amethi	186	Amethi									
Sultanpur	187	Isauli									
Sultanpur	188	Sultanpur									
Sultanpur	189	Sadar									
Sultanpur	190	Lambhua									
Sultanpur	191	Kadipur (SC)									
Farrukhabad	192	Kaimganj (SC)									
Farrukhabad	193	Amritpur									
Farrukhabad	194	Farrukhabad									
Farrukhabad	195	Bhojpur									
Kannauj	196	Chhibramau									
Kannauj	197	Tirwa									
Kannauj	198	Kannauj (SC)									
Etawah	199	Jaswantnagar									
Etawah	200	Etawah									
Etawah	201	Bharthana (SC)									
Auraiya	202	Bidhuna									
Auraiya	203	Dibiyapur									
Auraiya	204	Auraiya (SC)									
Kanpur Dehat	205	Rasulabad (SC)									
Kanpur Dehat	206	Akbarpur-Raniya									
Kanpur Dehat	207	Sikandra									
Kanpur Dehat	208	Bhognipur									
Kanpur Nagar	209	Bilhaur (SC)									
Kanpur Nagar	210	Bithoor									
Kanpur Nagar	211	Kalyanpur									
Kanpur Nagar	212	Govind Nagar									
Kanpur Nagar	213	Sishamau									
Kanpur Nagar	214	Arya Nagar									
Kanpur Nagar	215	Kidwai Nagar									
Kanpur Nagar	216	Kanpur Cantonment									
Kanpur Nagar	217	Maharajpur									
Kanpur Nagar	218	Ghatampur (SC)									
Jalaun	219	Madhogarh									
Jalaun	220	Kalpi									
Jalaun	221	Orai (SC)									
Jhansi	222	Babina									
Jhansi	223	Jhansi Nagar									
Jhansi	224	Mauranipur (SC)									
Jhansi	225	Garautha									
Lalitpur	226	Lalitpur									
Lalitpur	227	Mehroni (SC)									
Hamirpur	228	Hamirpur									
Hamirpur	229	Rath (SC)									
Mahoba	230	Mahoba									
Mahoba	231	Charkhari									
Banda	232	Tindwari									
Banda	233	Baberu									
Banda	234	Naraini (SC)									
Banda	235	Banda									
Chitrakoot	236	Chitrakoot									
Chitrakoot	237	Manikpur									
Fatehpur	238	Jahanabad									
Fatehpur	239	Bindki									
Fatehpur	240	Fatehpur									
Fatehpur	241	Ayah Shah									
Fatehpur	242	Husainganj									
Fatehpur	243	Khaga (SC)									
Pratapgarh	244	Rampur Khas									
Pratapgarh	245	Babaganj (SC)									
Pratapgarh	246	Kunda									
Pratapgarh	247	Vishwanathganj									
Pratapgarh	248	Pratapgarh									
Pratapgarh	249	Patti									
Pratapgarh	250	Raniganj									
Kaushambi	251	Sirathu									
Kaushambi	252	Manjhanpur (SC)									
Kaushambi	253	Chail									
Prayagraj	254	Phaphamau									
Prayagraj	255	Soraon (SC)									
Prayagraj	256	Phulpur									
Prayagraj	257	Pratappur									
Prayagraj	258	Handia									
Prayagraj	259	Meja									
Prayagraj	260	Karachhana									
Prayagraj	261	Prayagraj West									
Prayagraj	262	Prayagraj North									
Prayagraj	263	Prayagraj South									
Prayagraj	264	Bara (SC)									
Prayagraj	265	Koraon (SC)									
Barabanki	266	Kursi									
Barabanki	267	Ram Nagar									
Barabanki	268	Barabanki									
Barabanki	269	Zaidpur (SC)									
Barabanki	270	Dariyabad									
Ayodhya	271	Rudauli									
Barabanki	272	Haidergarh (SC)									
Ayodhya	273	Milkipur (SC)									
Ayodhya	274	Bikapur									
Ayodhya	275	Ayodhya									
Ayodhya	276	Goshainganj									
Ambedkar Nagar	277	Katehari									
Ambedkar Nagar	278	Tanda									
Ambedkar Nagar	279	Alapur (SC)									
Ambedkar Nagar	280	Jalalpur									
Ambedkar Nagar	281	Akbarpur									
Bahraich	282	Balha (SC)									
Bahraich	283	Nanpara									
Bahraich	284	Matera									
Bahraich	285	Mahasi									
Bahraich	286	Bahraich									
Bahraich	287	Payagpur									
Bahraich	288	Kaiserganj									
Shravasti	289	Bhinga									
Shravasti	290	Shrawasti									
Balrampur	291	Tulsipur									
Balrampur	292	Gainsari									
Balrampur	293	Utraula									
Balrampur	294	Balrampur (SC)									
Gonda	295	Mehnaun									
Gonda	296	Gonda									
Gonda	297	Katra Bazar									
Gonda	298	Colonelganj									
Gonda	299	Tarabganj									
Gonda	300	Mankapur (SC)									
Gonda	301	Gaura									
Siddharthnagar	302	Shohratgarh									
Siddharthnagar	303	Kapilvastu (SC)									
Siddharthnagar	304	Bansi									
Siddharthnagar	305	Itwa									
Siddharthnagar	306	Domariyaganj									
Basti	307	Harraiya									
Basti	308	Kaptanganj									
Basti	309	Rudhauli									
Basti	310	Basti Sadar									
Basti	311	Mahadewa (SC)									
Sant Kabir Nagar	312	Menhdawal									
Sant Kabir Nagar	313	Khalilabad									
Sant Kabir Nagar	314	Dhanghata (SC)									
Maharajganj	315	Pharenda									
Maharajganj	316	Nautanwa									
Maharajganj	317	Siswa									
Maharajganj	318	Maharajganj (SC)									
Maharajganj	319	Paniyara									
Gorakhpur	320	Caimpiyarganj									
Gorakhpur	321	Pipraich									
Gorakhpur	322	Gorakhpur Urban									
Gorakhpur	323	Gorakhpur Rural									
Gorakhpur	324	Sahajanwa									
Gorakhpur	325	Khajani (SC)									
Gorakhpur	326	Chauri-Chaura									
Gorakhpur	327	Bansgaon (SC)									
Gorakhpur	328	Chillupar									
Kushinagar	329	Khadda									
Kushinagar	330	Padrauna									
Kushinagar	331	Tamkuhi Raj									
Kushinagar	332	Fazilnagar									
Kushinagar	333	Kushinagar									
Kushinagar	334	Hata									
Kushinagar	335	Ramkola (SC)									
Deoria	336	Rudrapur									
Deoria	337	Deoria									
Deoria	338	Pathardeva									
Deoria	339	Rampur Karkhana									
Deoria	340	Bhatpar Rani									
Deoria	341	Salempur (SC)									
Deoria	342	Barhaj									
Azamgarh	343	Atrauliya									
Azamgarh	344	Gopalpur									
Azamgarh	345	Sagri									
Azamgarh	346	Mubarakpur									
Azamgarh	347	Azamgarh									
Azamgarh	348	Nizamabad									
Azamgarh	349	Phoolpur Pawai									
Azamgarh	350	Didarganj									
Azamgarh	351	Lalganj (SC)									
Azamgarh	352	Mehnagar (SC)									
Mau	353	Madhuban									
Mau	354	Ghosi									
Mau	355	Muhammadabad-Gohna (SC)									
Mau	356	Mau									
Ballia	357	Belthara Road (SC)									
Ballia	358	Rasara									
Ballia	359	Sikanderpur									
Ballia	360	Phephana									
Ballia	361	Ballia Nagar									
Ballia	362	Bansdih									
Ballia	363	Bairia									
Jaunpur	364	Badlapur									
Jaunpur	365	Shahganj									
Jaunpur	366	Jaunpur									
Jaunpur	367	Malhani									
Jaunpur	368	Mungra Badshahpur									
Jaunpur	369	Machhlishahr (SC)									
Jaunpur	370	Mariyahu									
Jaunpur	371	Zafrabad									
Jaunpur	372	Kerakat (SC)									
Ghazipur	373	Jakhanian (SC)									
Ghazipur	374	Saidpur (SC)									
Ghazipur	375	Ghazipur Sadar									
Ghazipur	376	Jangipur									
Ghazipur	377	Zahoorabad									
Ghazipur	378	Mohammadabad									
Ghazipur	379	Zamania									
Chandauli	380	Mughalsarai									
Chandauli	381	Sakaldiha									
Chandauli	382	Saiyadraja									
Chandauli	383	Chakia (SC)									
Varanasi	384	Pindra									
Varanasi	385	Ajagara (SC)									
Varanasi	386	Shivpur									
Varanasi	387	Rohaniya									
Varanasi	388	Varanasi North									
Varanasi	389	Varanasi South									
Varanasi	390	Varanasi Cantt.									
Varanasi	391	Sevapuri									
Bhadohi	392	Bhadohi									
Bhadohi	393	Gyanpur									
Bhadohi	394	Aurai (SC)									
Mirzapur	395	Chhanbey (SC)									
Mirzapur	396	Mirzapur									
Mirzapur	397	Majhawan									
Mirzapur	398	Chunar									
Mirzapur	399	Marihan									
Sonbhadra	400	Ghorawal									
Sonbhadra	401	Robertsganj									
Sonbhadra	402	Obra (ST)									
Sonbhadra	403	Duddhi (ST)									

== See also ==
- Elections in Uttar Pradesh
- Politics of Uttar Pradesh
- 2024 Indian general election in Uttar Pradesh
