= Sultanpur Assembly constituency =

Constituency of the Uttar Pradesh legislative assembly in India

Coordinates: 26.26°N 82.07°E

Sultanpur
- Constituency No. 189 for the Uttar Pradesh Legislative Assembly

Constituency details
- Country: India
- Region: North India
- State: Uttar Pradesh
- District: Sultanpur
- Reservation: None

Member of Legislative Assembly
- 18th Uttar Pradesh Legislative Assembly
- Incumbent Vinod Singh
- Party: Bharatiya Janata Party
- Elected year: 2022

Sultanpur is a constituency of the Uttar Pradesh Legislative Assembly covering the city of Sultanpur and some other parts of Sadar tehsil in Sultanpur district.

Sultanpur is one of five assembly constituencies in the Sultanpur Lok Sabha constituency. Since 2008, this assembly constituency is numbered 188 amongst 403 constituencies. As of 2022, it is represented by Vinod Singh of the Bharatiya Janata Party.

== Members of the Legislative Assembly ==
Election	Name	Party
2002	Om Prakash Pandey	Bharatiya Janata Party
2007	Anoop Sanda	Samajwadi Party
2012	Anoop Sanda	Samajwadi Party
2017	Surya Bhan Singh	Bharatiya Janata Party
2022	Vinod Singh	Bharatiya Janata Party

== Election results ==
=== 2027 ===
2027 Uttar Pradesh Legislative Assembly election: Sultanpur
Party	Candidate	Votes	%	±%
INDIA				
NDA				
BSP	Imtiyaz Ahmed Bhutto			
NOTA	None of the above			
Majority				
Turnout				
gain from		Swing		

=== 2022 ===
2022 Uttar Pradesh Legislative Assembly election: Sultanpur
Party	Candidate	Votes	%	±%
BJP	Vinod Singh	92,715	42.24	−0.12
SP	Anoop Sanda	91,706	41.78	+15.79
BSP	Dr Sahay Mishra	22,521	10.26	−16.29
AIMIM	Mirza Akram Baig	5,251	2.39	
INC	Firoz Khan	2,655	1.21	
NOTA	None of the above	1,443	0.66	+0.05
Majority		1,009	0.46	−15.35
Turnout		219,508	57.68	+0.92
BJP hold		Swing		

2017 Uttar Pradesh Legislative Assembly Election: Sultanpu
Party	Candidate	Votes	%	±%
BJP	Surya Bhan Singh	86,786	42.36	
BSP	Mujeeb Ahmad	54,393	26.55	
SP	Anoop Sanda	53,238	25.99	
Sarv Sambhaav Party	Ram Dular Pathak	1,859	0.91	
NOTA	None of the above	1,234	0.61	
Majority		32,393	15.81	
Turnout		204,858	56.76	

== See also ==
- Sultanpur district
- List of constituencies of the Uttar Pradesh Legislative Assembly
