= Subhash Tripathi =

Indian politician (born 1955)

Member of Uttar Pradesh Legislative Assembly
- Incumbent
- Assumed office March 2017
- Preceded by: Mukesh Srivastava
- Constituency: Payagpur

Member of Uttar Pradesh Legislative Council
- In office January 1998 – January 2004
- Constituency: Bahraich Shravasti Local Authorities

Personal details
- Born: 31 December 1955 (age 70) Bahraich, Uttar Pradesh
- Party: Bharatiya Janata Party
- Parent: Gyan Prakash Tripathi (father)
- Education: Master of Arts
- Alma mater: Dr. Ram Manohar Lohia Avadh University
- Profession: Politician

Subhash Tripathi (born 31 December 1955) is an Indian politician and a member of the Uttar Pradesh Legislative Assembly from the Payagpur Assembly constituency of the Bahraich district. He is a member of the Bharatiya Janata Party.

== Early life ==
Tripathi was born on 31 December 1955 in Bahraich, Uttar Pradesh, to a Hindu family of Gyan Prakash Tripathi. He married Krishna Tripathi in 1980, and they have two children.

== Education ==
Tripathi completed his post-graduation with a Master of Arts in psychology at the Dr. Ram Manohar Lohia Avadh University, Faizabad, Uttar Pradesh, in 1979.

== Posts held ==
#	From	To	Constituency	Position	Ref
01	January 1998	January 2004	Bahraich-Shravasti LA	Member, Uttar Pradesh Legislative Council	
02	March 2017	March 2022	Payagpur	Member, 17th Uttar Pradesh Assembly	
03	March 2022	Incumbent	Payagpur	Member, 18th Uttar Pradesh Assembly	

== See also ==
- 18th Uttar Pradesh Assembly
- Payagpur Assembly constituency
- Uttar Pradesh Legislative Assembly
