= Vinod Singh (Sultanpur politician) =

Indian politician

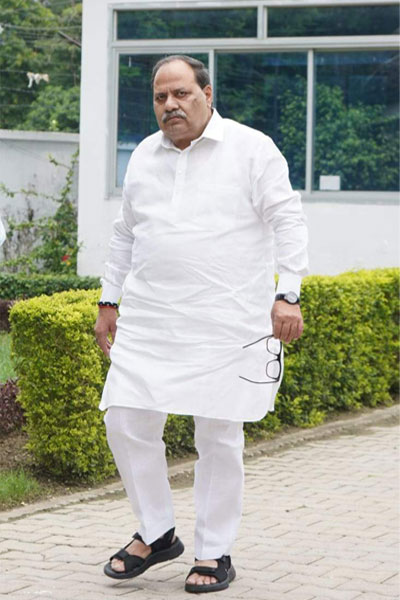
- Vinod Singh in 2026

Member of the Uttar Pradesh Legislative Assembly
- Incumbent
- Assumed office March 2022
- Constituency: 188 Vidhansabha Sultanpur U.P.

Personal details
- Born: 14 August 1957 (age 68)
- Party: Bharatiya Janata Party
- Education: Dr. Ram Manohar Lohiya Awadh University
- Occupation: Politician

Vinod Singh (born 1958) is an Indian politician from Uttar Pradesh. He is a member of the Uttar Pradesh Legislative Assembly from Sultanpur Assembly constituency in Sultanpur district. He won the 2022 Uttar Pradesh Legislative Assembly election representing the Bharatiya Janata Party.

== Early life and education ==
Singh is from Sultanpur, Uttar Pradesh. He is the son of former MP and Congress minister, Kedarnath Singh. He completed his bachelor's degree in Arts and master's degree in political science in the year 1980 from University of Delhi. He pursued his bachelor's degree in Law from Dr. Ram Manohar Lohia Avadh University, Ayodhya in the year 1986. He is married to Asha Singh, with whom he shares two children, Pulkit Singh and Palak Singh.

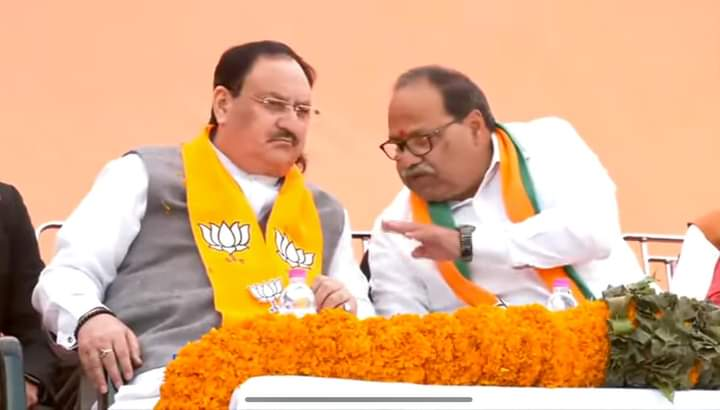
Vinod Singh with BJP President Sri J. P. Nadda

== Career ==
He started his career at Allahabad High Court under Advocate General Sri S. S. Bhatnagar. He was elected as MLA on May 11, 2007 and on May 13, 2007 he was inducted as Minister of State (Independent Charge) Tourism in the Government of Uttar Pradesh.

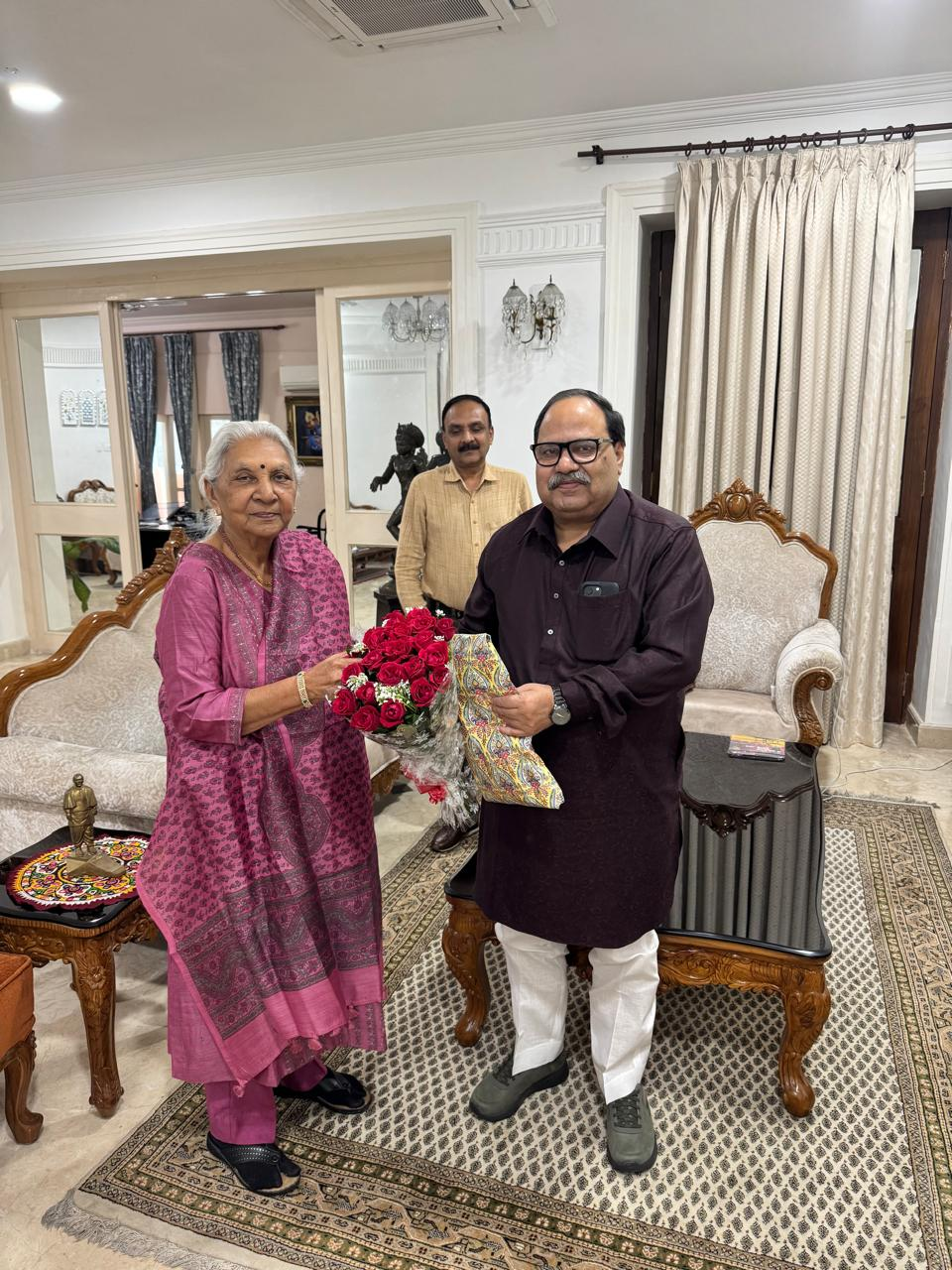
Vinod Singh with Governor of Uttar Pradesh Anandiben Patel

Once again in 2022, Vinod Singh won from Sultanpur Assembly constituency, (188 विधानसभा सुलतानपुर) representing the Bharatiya Janata Party in the 2022 Uttar Pradesh Legislative Assembly election.

On August 4 2026 a woman accuses Vinod Singh and his gunner, Dhananjay Yadav of sexual harassment and attempted to rape her
