= Sakuntla Devi =

Indian politician

Member of Legislative Assembly, Uttar Pradesh
- In office Mar 2012 – 2017
- Succeeded by: Chetram
- Constituency: Powayan

Personal details
- Born: 12 August 1972 (age 53) Shahjahanpur, Uttar Pradesh, India
- Party: Samajwadi Party
- Spouse: Mithlesh Kumar (m. 1987)
- Children: 3
- Profession: Politician
- Source

Sakuntla Devi is an Indian politician from Uttar Pradesh. She is a member of the Sixteenth Legislative Assembly of Uttar Pradesh in India from Powayan Assembly constituency in Shahjahanpur district from 2012 to 2017 representing the Samajwadi Party.

== Life and education ==
Sakuntla Devi was born in Shahjahanpur to Dinanath. She attended the Chatripati Shivaji Inter Jogi Ther College and is educated till eighth grade. She married Mithlesh Kumar in 1987. They have two sons and a daughter.

== Political career ==
Sakuntla Devi has been an MLA for one term. She represented the Powayan constituency and is a member of the Samajwadi Party political party.

== Posts held ==
#	From	To	Position	Comments
01	2012	2017	Member, 16th Legislative Assembly	

== See also ==
- Powayan (Assembly constituency)
- Uttar Pradesh Legislative Assembly
