= Rudauli Assembly constituency =

Constituency of the Uttar Pradesh legislative assembly in India

Coordinates: 26.75°N 81.75°E

Rudauli
- Constituency No. 271 for the Uttar Pradesh Legislative Assembly

Constituency details
- Country: India
- Region: North India
- State: Uttar Pradesh
- District: Ayodhya
- Total electors: 3,56,678
- Reservation: None

Member of Legislative Assembly
- 18th Uttar Pradesh Legislative Assembly
- Incumbent Ram Chandra Yadav
- Party: Bharatiya Janta Party
- Elected year: 2022
- Preceded by: Abbas Ali Zaidi

Rudauli is a constituency of the Uttar Pradesh Legislative Assembly covering the city of Rudauli in the Ayodhya district of Uttar Pradesh, India.

Rudauli is one of five assembly constituencies in the Ayodhya Lok Sabha constituency.

== Members of the Legislative Assembly ==
Year	Member	Party
1957	Mukut Behari Lal	Bharatiya Jana Sangh
1962	Mukut Behari Lal	Bharatiya Jana Sangh
1967	Chandra Kumar	Independent
1969	Krishna Magan Singh	Indian National Congress
1974	Ram Sevak Yadav	Bharatiya Kranti Dal
1977	Pradeep Kumar Yadav	Janata Party
1980	Pradeep Kumar Yadav	Janata Party (Secular)
1985	Margoob Ahmad Khan	Indian National Congress
1989	Pradeep Kumar Yadav	Janata Dal
1991	Ram Dev Acharya	Bharatiya Janata Party
1993	Ishtiyak Ahmad	Samajwadi Party
1996	Ram Dev Acharya	Bharatiya Janata Party
2002	Abbas Ali Zaidi	Samajwadi Party
2007	Abbas Ali Zaidi	Samajwadi Party
2012	Ram Chandra Yadav	Bharatiya Janata Party
2017	Ram Chandra Yadav	Bharatiya Janata Party
2022	Ram Chandra Yadav	Bharatiya Janata Party

== Election results ==
=== 2027 ===
2027 Uttar Pradesh Legislative Assembly election: Rudauli
Party	Candidate	Votes	%	±%
INDIA				
NDA				
BSP				
NOTA	None of the above			
Majority				
Turnout				
gain from		Swing		

=== 2022 ===
2022 Uttar Pradesh Legislative Assembly election: Rudauli
Party	Candidate	Votes	%	±%
BJP	Ram Chandra Yadav	94,031	42.95	▼0.01
SP	Anand Sen Yadav	53,415	24.4	▼3.69
BSP	Abbas Ali Zaidi Alias Rushdi	52,181	23.84	▲1.36
AIMIM	Sher Afghan	9,961	4.55	
INC	Dayanand Shukla	3,270	1.49	
NOTA	None of the above	1,958	0.89	▼0.18
Majority		40,616	18.55	▲3.68
Turnout		218,920	61.38	▼1.15
BJP hold		Swing		

=== 2017 ===
2017 Uttar Pradesh Legislative Assembly Election: Rudauli
Party	Candidate	Votes	%	±%
BJP	Ram Chandra Yadav	90,311	42.96	
SP	Abbas Ali Zaidi Urf Rushdi Miyan	59,052	28.09	
BSP	Firoz Khan Urf Gabbar	47,257	22.48	
Sabka Dal United	Pramod Kumar Lodhi	2,104	1.0	
NOTA	None of the above	2,225	1.07	
Majority		31,259	14.87	
Turnout		210,239	62.53	

== See also ==
- List of constituencies of the Uttar Pradesh Legislative Assembly
- Ayodhya district
