= Mohammad Aslam (politician) =

Indian politician

Member of Legislative Assembly
- In office March 2017 – March 2022
- Preceded by: Indrani Devi
- Succeeded by: Indrani Devi
- Constituency: Bhinga

Personal details
- Born: Mohammad Aslam Raini; 12 March 1965 (age 61) Bhinga Dehat, Shravasti, Uttar Pradesh, India
- Party: Bahujan Samaj Party
- Spouse: Anisa Bano (m.1989)
- Children: 3
- Parent: Mohammad Zahur (father)
- Occupation: Politician
- Profession: Farmer

Mohammad Aslam is an Indian politician and Member of the Legislative Assembly from Bhinga from 2017 to 2022.
