= Payagpur Assembly constituency =

Constituency of the Uttar Pradesh legislative assembly in India

Coordinates: 27.40°N 81.78°E

Payagpur
- Constituency No. 287 for the Uttar Pradesh Legislative Assembly

Constituency details
- Country: India
- Region: North India
- State: Uttar Pradesh
- District: Bahraich
- Total electors: 3,90,097
- Reservation: None

Member of Legislative Assembly
- 18th Uttar Pradesh Legislative Assembly
- Incumbent Subhash Tripathi
- Party: Bharatiya Janata Party
- Elected year: 2017

Payagpur is a constituency of the Uttar Pradesh Legislative Assembly covering the city of Payagpur and other parts of Bhairach tehsil as well as parts of Kaiserganj tehsil, both in Bahraich district of Uttar Pradesh, India. It is one of five assembly constituencies in the Kaiserganj Lok Sabha constituency. Since 2008, this assembly constituency is numbered 287 amongst 403 constituencies.

As of 2022, this seat is represented by Bharatiya Janata Party candidate Subhash Tripathi who won the 2022 Uttar Pradesh Legislative Assembly election, defeating Samajwadi Party candidate Mukesh Srivastava by a margin of 41,541 votes.

== Members of the Legislative Assembly ==
Election	Name	Party
2012	Mukesh Srivastava	Indian National Congress
2017	Subhash Tripathi	Bharatiya Janata Party
2022	Subhash Tripathi	Bharatiya Janata Party

== Election results ==
=== 2027 ===
2027 Uttar Pradesh Legislative Assembly election: Payagpur
Party	Candidate	Votes	%	±%
INDIA				
NDA				
BSP				
NOTA	None of the above			
Majority				
Turnout				
gain from		Swing		

=== 2022 ===
2022 Uttar Pradesh Legislative Assembly election: Payagpur
Party	Candidate	Votes	%	±%
BJP	Subhash Tripathi	110,162	47.77	−1.82
SP	Mukesh Srivastava	98,106	42.54	+13.1
BSP	Geeta	11,232	4.87	−9.25
AIMIM	Raise Ahmad	3,586	1.55	
INC	Rana Shivam Singh	2,957	1.28	−0.78
NOTA	None of the above	2,322	1.01	−0.4
Majority		12,056	5.23	−14.92
Turnout		230,613	59.12	+2.32
BJP hold		Swing		

=== 2017 ===
2017 Uttar Pradesh Legislative Assembly election: Payagpur
Party	Candidate	Votes	%	±%
BJP	Subhash Tripathi	102,254	49.59	
SP	Mukesh Srivastava Alias Gyanendera Pratap	60,713	29.44	
BSP	Mohd. Mushraf	29,122	14.12	
INC	Bhagat Ram	4,239	2.06	
Lok Shahi Party (Secular)	Aswani Kumar	2,284	1.11	
NOTA	None of the above	2,871	1.41	
Majority		41,541	20.15	
Turnout		206,193	56.8	
BJP gain from INC		Swing		

== See also ==
- Bahraich district
- List of constituencies of the Uttar Pradesh Legislative Assembly
