= Nirmal Khatri =

Indian politician

Dr. Nirmal Khatri

Member of Parliament, 15th Lok Sabha
- In office 2009–2014
- Preceded by: Mitrasen Yadav
- Succeeded by: Lallu Singh
- Constituency: Faizabad

Member of Parliament, 8th Lok Sabha
- In office Dec 1984 – Nov 1989
- Preceded by: Jai Ram Varma
- Succeeded by: Mitrasen Yadav
- Constituency: Faizabad

MLA, 8th Vidhan Sabha
- In office Jun 1980 – Mar 1985

President of Uttar Pradesh Congress Committee
- In office 29 August 2012 – 12 July 2016
- Preceded by: Rita Bahuguna Joshi
- Succeeded by: Raj Babbar

Personal details
- Born: 4 January 1951 (age 75) Ayodhya, Uttar Pradesh, India
- Party: Indian National Congress
- Spouse: Veena Khattri
- Children: 2
- Parent(s): Mr. Narayan Das Khattry (Father) & Mrs. Bimla Khattry (mother)
- Education: K. S. Saket PG College in Ayodhya, Faizabad
- Profession: Advocate, farmer & politician
- Committees: Member of several committees
- Website: drnirmalkhatri.com

Dr. Nirmal Khatri is an Indian Politician and is Member of Parliament of India. He was a member of the 15th Lok Sabha and also was a member of the 8th Lok Sabha. In both terms, he represented the Faizabad constituency of Uttar Pradesh and is a member of the Indian National Congress political party.

== Early life and education ==
Nirmal Khatri was born in Ayodhya in the state of Uttar Pradesh. He attended the K.S. Saket P.G. College in Ayodhya and received LL.B and MA (in political science). Subsequently, he was awarded PhD degree. Khatri worked as an advocate and farmer before joining politics.

== Political career ==
Nirmal Khatri has been in active politics since early 1970s. During his early days, he joined Youth wing of Indian National Congress before gradually moving to Indian National Congress. During his political career, he held several key party positions. Khatri is also a former member and minister in the Uttar Pradesh Legislative Assembly.

== Posts held ==
#	From	To	Position
01	1980	1985	Member, Uttar Pradesh Legislative Assembly
02	1980	1981	Deputy Minister, Government of Uttar Pradesh
03	1981	1982	Minister of State, Government of Uttar Pradesh
04	1984	1989	Member, 8th Lok Sabha
05	1985	1987	Member, House Committee, Lok Sabha
06	2009	2014	Member, 15th Lok Sabha
07	2009	2010	Convenor, Second Sub-Committee of the Committee of Parliament on Official Language
08	2009	2014	Member, Standing Committee on Railways
09	2009	2014	Member, Consultative Committee, Ministry of Human Resource Development
10	2009	2014	Member, JPC to examine matters related to allocation and pricing of telecom licenses and spectrum
11	2009	2014	Member, Central Advisory Board of Archaeology
12	2009	2014	Deputy chairman, Rajbhash Committee of Parliament
13	2013	2014	Member, House Committee

== See also ==
- 8th & 15th Lok Sabha
- Lok Sabha
- Politics of India
- Parliament of India
- Government of India
- Indian National Congress
- Faizabad (Lok Sabha constituency)
- Uttar Pradesh Legislative Assembly
