= Ram Krishna Sinha =

Member of Parliament; 4th & 5th Lok Sabha From 1967 to 1977
- In office 1967 – Jan 1977
- Preceded by: Ram Krishna Sinha
- Succeeded by: Anantram Jaiswal
- Constituency: Faizabad

Member of Parliament; 4th & 5th Lok Sabha
- In office March 1967 – December 1977
- Preceded by: Brij Basi Lal
- Succeeded by: Ram Krishna Sinha
- Constituency: Faizabad

Personal details
- Born: 1 September 1920 Faizabad, United Provinces of Agra and Oudh; British India (now-Ayodhya, Uttar Pradesh, India)
- Died: 24 August 1984 (aged 63) Ayodhya, Uttar Pradesh, India
- Party: Congress
- Other political affiliations: Socialist Party; Congress Socialist Party (till 1951)
- Spouse: Lokmudi Sinha
- Children: Rashi Krishna Sinha
- Parent: Rajeshwari Prasad (Father)
- Education: Lucknow University
- Occupation: Was a Freedom Fighter In the struggle for Indian Independence Turned Politician and Advocate
- Profession: Advocate, politician
- Committees: 1 chairman i. Estimates Committee of the Parliament (1974–75 & 1975–76) ii. Railway Convention Committee (1971–73) iii. 1st Pay Committee of Parliament (1974) 2. Member of several committees

Ram Krishna Sinha (1 September 1920 – 24 August 1984) was an Indian freedom fighter, politician and Member of Parliament of India. He was a member of the 4th and the 5th Lok Sabhas of India. Sinha represented the Faizabad constituency of Uttar Pradesh and was a member of the Congress political party.

== Early life and education ==
Sinha was born in Faizabad in the state of Uttar Pradesh. He attended Lucknow University where he attained Bachelor of Laws followed by Master of Science degrees. He worked as an advocate prior to joining Indian independence movement and politics. He got married in 1949.

== Political career ==
=== Pre-independence ===
He participated in the Indian independence movement. He got involved with the Quit India Movement in 1930s and was imprisoned twice between 1938 and 1942. After his release and between 1942 and 1944, he was detained in Faizabad and Lucknow jails. After getting released from detention, he had to remain underground till 1945. In 1945, Sir Ram Krishna assumed the post of President, UP Student's Congress and entered active politics.

=== Post independence ===
He entered politics in early 1930s. He joined Congress party but soon moved to Socialist Party (India) followed by Congress Socialist Party. By 1951, he was back with Congress party. He held several key party and parliamentary positions in the coming years. He was Member of Parliament, twice from the same constituency.

He convened several conferences; viz "Northern India Freedom Fighters Conference", "National Conference on Freedom Fighters", "Socialism", "Democracy", "Non-alignment and National Integration" etc.

== Posts held ==
#	From	To	Position
01	1967	1970	Member, 04th Lok Sabha
02	1969	1969	Represented India in UN
03	1970	1970	Parliamentary group leader to GDR & Yugoslavia
04	1971	1971	Member, 05th Lok Sabha

== See also ==
- 4th and 5th Lok Sabha
- Lok Sabha
- Politics of India
- Parliament of India
- Government of India
- Indian National Congress
- Faizabad (Lok Sabha constituency)
- List of Indian independence activists
