= Shawkat Ali (AIMIM politician) =

Indian politician

Shawkat Ali is an Indian politician. He is the current leader in Uttar Pradesh state of the All India Majlis-e-Ittehadul Muslimeen party (AIMIM). In June 2026 he was selected as the party's candidate for the Matera Assembly constituency in Bahraich district in the upcoming 2027 Uttar Pradesh Legislative Assembly election.
