= Mitrasen Yadav =

Indian politician (1934–2015)

Member of Parliament, Lok Sabha
- In office 13 May 2004 – 16 May 2009
- Preceded by: Vinay Katiyar
- Succeeded by: Nirmal Khatri
- Constituency: Faizabad
- In office 8 March 1998 – 6 October 1999
- Preceded by: Vinay Katiyar
- Succeeded by: Vinay Katiyar
- Constituency: Faizabad
- In office 27 November 1989 – 16 June 1991
- Preceded by: Nirmal Khatri
- Succeeded by: Vinay Katiyar
- Constituency: Faizabad

Member of Uttar Pradesh Legislative Assembly
- In office 6 March 2012 – 7 September 2015
- Preceded by: Jitendra Kumar Singh
- Succeeded by: Anand Sen Yadav
- Constituency: Bikapur
- In office 4 December 1993 – 8 March 1998
- Preceded by: Mathura Prasad Tewari
- Succeeded by: Ram Chandra Yadav
- Constituency: Milkipur
- In office 23 June 1977 – 27 November 1989
- Preceded by: Dharam Chandra
- Succeeded by: Brij Bhusan Mani Tripathi
- Constituency: Milkipur

Personal details
- Born: 11 July 1934 Faizabad, United Provinces, British India (present day-Ayodhya, Uttar Pradesh, India)
- Died: 7 September 2015 (aged 81) Lucknow, Uttar Pradesh, India
- Party: Samajwadi Party
- Other political affiliations: Communist Party of India
- Spouse: Shyamkali Yadav
- Children: 2 (daughter's), 2 (son's) including Anand Sen Yadav
- As of 17 September 2006

Mitrasen Yadav (11 July 1934 – 7 September 2015) was an Indian politician former MP & MLA affiliated with Samajwadi Party & earlier with Communist Party of India.

== Career ==
Mitrasen entered politics as a member of the Communist Party of India in 1966. He was one of the accused in 16 criminal cases including 6 cases of attempt to murder and 3 cases of dacoity, according to his affidavit at the time on nomination.

In 1977, Mitrasen Yadav was elected to the Uttar Pradesh Vidhan Sabha from Milkipur constituency as a Communist Party of India candidate. He was re-elected to the Uttar Pradesh Vidhan Sabha in 1977, 1980, 1985 and in 2012 from Bikapur.

Mitrasen Yadav was elected to the 9th Lok Sabha from Ayodhya constituency as a CPI candidate in 1991. On 4 March 1995, he joined Samajwadi Party (SP). In 1998, he was elected to the 12th Lok Sabha as a Samajwadi Party candidate from the same constituency. In 2004, Mitrasen again joined the BSP, and was elected to the 14th Lok Sabha. In 2009, he again joined the SP.

== Positions held ==
#	From	To	Position
1.	1977	1980	MLA (1st term) from Milkipur
2.	1980	1985	MLA (2nd term) from Milkipur
3.	1985	1989	MLA (3rd term) from Milkipur
4.	1989	1991	MP (1st term) in 9th Lok Sabha from Ayodhya
5.	1993	1996	MLA (4th term) from Milkipur
6.	1998	1999	MP (2nd term) in 12th Lok Sabha from Ayodhya
7.	2004	2009	MP (3rd term) in 14th Lok Sabha from Ayodhya
8.	2012	2015	MLA from Bikapur

== Death ==
Mitrasen Yadav died on the morning of 7 September 2015.
