= Indrani Devi =

Member of the Uttar Pradesh Legislative Assembly

Member of Uttar Pradesh Legislative Assembly
- Incumbent
- Assumed office March 2022
- Preceded by: Mohammad Aslam
- Constituency: Bhinga

Personal details
- Born: 15 June 1969 (age 56) Shahpur, Uttar Pradesh
- Party: Samajwadi Party
- Profession: Politician

Indrani Devi is an Indian politician and a member of the 18th Uttar Pradesh Assembly from the Bhinga Assembly constituency of the Shravasti district. He is a member of the Samajwadi Party.

== Early life ==
Indrani Devi was born on 15 June 1969 in Shahpur, Uttar Pradesh, to a Hindu family of Avadh Bihari Verma. He married Gyan Prakash on 12 February 1982. They have six children.

== See also ==
- 18th Uttar Pradesh Assembly
- Bhinga Assembly constituency
- Uttar Pradesh Legislative Assembly
