= Anand Sen Yadav =

Indian politician

Minister of State (Independent Charge) Government of Uttar Pradesh
- In office 23 May 2007 – 9 November 2007
- Chief Minister: Mayawati
- Ministry & Department's: Food Processing Industries

Member of Uttar Pradesh Legislative Assembly
- In office 16 February 2016 – 11 March 2017
- Preceded by: Mitrasen Yadav
- Succeeded by: Shobha Singh Chauhan
- Constituency: Bikapur
- In office 13 May 2007 – 6 March 2012
- Preceded by: Ram Chandra Yadav
- Succeeded by: Awadhesh Prasad
- Constituency: Milkipur
- In office 26 February 2002 – 29 March 2004
- Preceded by: Ram Chandra Yadav
- Succeeded by: Ram Chandra Yadav
- Constituency: Milkipur

Personal details
- Born: 15 July 1965 (age 60) Faizabad, Uttar Pradesh India
- Party: Samajwadi Party
- Other political affiliations: Bahujan Samaj Party
- Spouse: Indu Sen Yadav
- Children: 3
- Parent: Mitrasen Yadav (father)
- As of 17 September 2006

Anand Sen Yadav is an Indian politician former Minister and MLA affiliated with Samajwadi Party.

Sen Yadav first won the 2002 elections from Milkipur, with the Samajwadi Party. And he won by- election in 2016 from Bikapur.

== Positions held ==
#	From	To	Position
1.	2002	2004	MLA (1st term) from Milkipur
2.	2007	2012	MLA (2nd term) from Milkipur
3.	2016	2017	MLA (3rd term) from Bikapur (by-poll)
