= Gopamau Assembly constituency =

Constituency of the Uttar Pradesh legislative assembly in India

Coordinates: 27.53°N 80.29°E

Gopamau
- Constituency No. 157 for the Uttar Pradesh Legislative Assembly

Constituency details
- Country: India
- Region: North India
- State: Uttar Pradesh
- District: Hardoi
- Total electors: 3,43,678
- Reservation: SC

Member of Legislative Assembly
- 18th Uttar Pradesh Legislative Assembly
- Incumbent Shyam Prakash
- Party: Bharatiya Janta Party
- Elected year: 2022

Gopamau is one of the 403 constituencies of the Uttar Pradesh Legislative Assembly, India. It comprises parts of Shahabad tehsil and Hardoi tehsil, both in Hardoi district, and is one of the five assembly constituencies in the Hardoi Lok Sabha constituency. As of 2022, it is represented by Bharatiya Janata Party candidate Shyam Prakash who won in last Assembly election of 2017 Uttar Pradesh Legislative Elections defeating Samajwadi Party candidate Rajeshwari by a margin of 31,378 votes.

== Members of the Legislative Assembly ==
| Election | Name | Party |
|---|---|---|
| 2012 | Shyam Prakash | Samajwadi Party |
| 2017 | Shyam Prakash | Bharatiya Janata Party |
| 2022 | Shyam Prakash | Bharatiya Janata Party |

== Elecction results ==
=== 2027 ===
2027 Uttar Pradesh Legislative Assembly election: Gopamau
| Party | Candidate | Votes | % | ±% |
|---|---|---|---|---|
| INDIA | | | | |
| NDA | | | | |
| BSP | Anil Kumar Gautam | | | |
| ASP(KR) | Karan Verma Pasi | | | |
| NOTA | None of the above | | | |
| Majority | | | | |
| Turnout | | | | |
| gain from | | Swing | | |

=== 2022 ===
2022 Uttar Pradesh Legislative Assembly election: Gopamau
| Party | Candidate | Votes | % | ±% |
|---|---|---|---|---|
| BJP | Shyam Prakash | 91,762 | 43.07 | −0.21 |
| SP | Rajeshwari Devi | 83,764 | 39.32 | +11.5 |
| BSP | Kamal Verma | 31,715 | 14.89 | −9.66 |
| NOTA | None of the above | 1,887 | 0.89 | −0.23 |
| Majority | | 7,998 | 3.75 | −11.71 |
| Turnout | | 213,048 | 61.99 | +0.54 |
| BJP hold | | Swing | | |

=== 2017 ===
2017 Uttar Pradesh Legislative Assembly election: Gopamau
| Party | Candidate | Votes | % | ±% |
|---|---|---|---|---|
| BJP | Shyam Prakash | 87,871 | 43.28 | |
| SP | Rajeshwari Devi | 56,493 | 27.82 | |
| BSP | Meena Kumari | 49,847 | 24.55 | |
| NOTA | None of the above | 2,252 | 1.12 | |
| Majority | | 31,378 | 15.46 | |
| Turnout | | 203,032 | 61.45 | |
