= Bikapur Assembly constituency =

Constituency of the Uttar Pradesh legislative assembly in India

Coordinates: 26.60°N 82.13°E

Bikapur
- Constituency No. 274 for the Uttar Pradesh Legislative Assembly

Constituency details
- Country: India
- Region: North India
- State: Uttar Pradesh
- District: Ayodhya
- Total electors: 3,80,107
- Reservation: None

Member of Legislative Assembly
- 18th Uttar Pradesh Legislative Assembly
- Incumbent Amit Singh Chauhan
- Party: Bharatiya Janata Party
- Elected year: 2022

Bikapur is a constituency of the Uttar Pradesh Legislative Assembly covering Sohawal tehsil and the city of Bikapur in the Ayodhya district of Uttar Pradesh, India. Bikapur is one of five assembly constituencies in the Faizabad Lok Sabha constituency. As of 2022, its representative is Amit Singh Chauhan of the Bharatiya Janata Party.

== Members of the Legislative Assembly ==
Year	Member	Party
1962	Akhand Pratap Singh	Indian National Congress
1967	Raj Bahadur Divedi	Indian National Congress
1969	Manwati Devi	Indian National Congress
1974	Sita Ram Nishad	Bharatiya Kranti Dal
1977	Sant Shriram Dwivedi	Janata Party
1980	Sitaram Nishad	Indian National Congress (I)
1985	Sitaram Nishad	Indian National Congress
1989	Sant Shriram Dwivedi	Independent
1991	Sant Shriram Dwivedi	Bharatiya Janata Party
1993	Parshuram	Samajwadi Party
1996	Sitaram Nishad	Samajwadi Party
2002	Sitaram Nishad	Samajwadi Party
2007	Jitendra Kumar Singh	Bahujan Samaj Party
2012	Mitrasen Yadav	Samajwadi Party
2016^	Anand Sen Yadav	Samajwadi Party
2017	Shobha Singh Chauhan	Bharatiya Janata Party
2022	Amit Singh Chauhan	Bharatiya Janata Party

== Election results ==
=== 2027 ===
2027 Uttar Pradesh Legislative Assembly election: Bikapur
Party	Candidate	Votes	%	±%
INDIA				
NDA				
BSP	Jitendra Singh Bablu			
NOTA	None of the above			
Majority				
Turnout				
gain from		Swing		

=== 2022 ===
2022 Uttar Pradesh Legislative Assembly election: Bikapur
Party	Candidate	Votes	%	±%
BJP	Amit Singh Chauhan	107,268	44.34	▲2.14
SP	Firoz Khan Urf Gabbar	101,708	42.04	▲11.79
BSP	Sunil Pathak	21,385	8.84	▼13.45
INC	Akhilesh Yadav	4,394	1.82	
NOTA	None of the above	1,382	0.57	▼0.45
Majority		5,560	2.3	▼9.65
Turnout		241,937	63.65	▲1.95
BJP gain from		Swing		

=== 2017 ===
2017 Uttar Pradesh Legislative Assembly Election: Bikapur
Party	Candidate	Votes	%	±%
BJP	Shobha Singh Chauhan	94,074	42.2	
SP	Anand Sen	67,422	30.25	
BSP	Jitendra Singh	49,690	22.29	
AIMIM	Juver Ahmad	3,275	1.47	
NOTA	None of the above	2,257	1.02	
Majority		26,652	11.95	
Turnout		222,916	61.7	
