= Amit Singh Chauhan =

Member of the Uttar Pradesh Legislative Assembly

Member of Uttar Pradesh Legislative Assembly
- Incumbent
- Assumed office March 2022
- Preceded by: Shobha Singh Chauhan
- Constituency: Bikapur

Personal details
- Born: 15 August 1987 (age 39) Ayodhya, Uttar Pradesh, India
- Party: Bharatiya Janata Party
- Spouse: Dr. Anamika Singh Chauhan
- Children: 2
- Parent: Munna Singh Chauhan (father)
- Education: MBBS
- Alma mater: Era's Lucknow Medical College
- Occupation: Doctor
- Profession: Politician

Amit Singh Chauhan (born 15 August 1987) is an Indian politician, doctor, and a member of the 18th Uttar Pradesh Assembly from the Bikapur Assembly constituency of Ayodhya district. He is a member of the Bharatiya Janata Party.

== Early life ==
Amit Singh Chauhan was born on 15 August 1987 in Ayodhya, Uttar Pradesh, to a Hindu Kshatriya family of Munna Singh Chauhan. He married Anamika Singh Chauhan on 2 April 1992, and they had two children.

== Education ==
Amit Singh Chauhan completed his education in Bachelor of Medicine and Bachelor of Surgery at Era's Lucknow Medical College, Lucknow.

== Posts held ==
#	From	To	Position	Comments
01	2022	Incumbent	Member, 18th Uttar Pradesh Assembly	

== See also ==
- 18th Uttar Pradesh Assembly
- Bikapur Assembly constituency
- Uttar Pradesh Legislative Assembly
