= Ram Chandra Yadav (Uttar Pradesh politician) =

Indian politician

Member of Uttar Pradesh Legislative Assembly
- Incumbent
- Assumed office 2012
- Preceded by: Abbas Ali Zaidi
- Constituency: Rudauli
- In office 2004–2007
- Preceded by: Mitrasen Yadav
- Succeeded by: Anand Sen Yadav
- Constituency: Milkipur
- In office 1998–2002
- Preceded by: Anand Sen Yadav
- Succeeded by: Anand Sen Yadav
- Constituency: Milkipur

Personal details
- Born: March 15, 1968 (age 58)
- Party: Bharatiya Janata Party
- Other political affiliations: Samajwadi Party Communist Party of India
- Occupation: politician

Ram Chandra Yadav (born 1968) is a Bharatiya Janata Party politician and a member of the Uttar Pradesh Legislative Assembly from Rudauli. He was arrested by the Uttar Pradesh police on 25 August 2013 during the Vishwa Hindu Parishad's Chaurasi Kos Padayatra.
