= Powayan Assembly constituency =

Constituency of the Uttar Pradesh legislative assembly in India

Powayan
- Constituency No. 134 for the Uttar Pradesh Legislative Assembly

Constituency details
- Country: India
- Region: North India
- State: Uttar Pradesh
- District: Shahjahanpur
- Established: 1956
- Total electors: 318,610 (2012)
- Reservation: SC

Member of Legislative Assembly
- 18th Uttar Pradesh Legislative Assembly
- Incumbent Chetram Pasi
- Party: Bhartiya Janta Party

Powayan is one of the 403 constituencies of the Uttar Pradesh Legislative Assembly, India. It is a part of the Shahjahanpur district and one of the five assembly constituencies in the Shahjahanpur Lok Sabha constituency. First election in this assembly constituency was held in 1957 after the "DPACO (1956)" (delimitation order) was passed in 1956. After the "Delimitation of Parliamentary and Assembly Constituencies Order" was passed in 2008, the constituency was assigned identification number 134.

== Wards / Areas ==
Extent of Powayan Assembly constituency is KCs Khutar, Powayan, Banda, Nahil, Powayan NP & Khutar NP of Powayan Tehsil.

== Members of the Legislative Assembly ==
#	Term	Name	Party	From	To	Days	Comments	Ref
01	01st Vidhan Sabha	-	-	Mar-1952	Mar-1957	1,849	Constituency not in existence	
02	02nd Vidhan Sabha	Rajkumar Surendra Singh	Independent	Apr-1957	Mar-1962	1,800	-	
02	02nd Vidhan Sabha	Kamle	Independent	Apr-1957	Mar-1962	1,800	-	
03	03rd Vidhan Sabha	Raja Vikaram Shah	Independent	Mar-1962	Mar-1967	1,828	-	
04	04th Vidhan Sabha	K. Lal	Indian National Congress	Mar-1967	Apr-1968	402	-	
05	05th Vidhan Sabha	Kandhai	Indian National Congress	Feb-1969	Mar-1974	1,832	-	
06	06th Vidhan Sabha	Roop Ram	Indian National Congress	Mar-1974	Apr-1977	1,153	-	
07	07th Vidhan Sabha	Suraj Prasad	Janata Party	Jun-1977	Feb-1980	969	-	
08	08th Vidhan Sabha	Roop Ram	Indian National Congress (I)	Jun-1980	Mar-1985	1,735	-	
09	09th Vidhan Sabha	Chetram Pasi	Indian National Congress	Mar-1985	Nov-1989	1,725	-	
10	10th Vidhan Sabha	Chetram Pasi	Indian National Congress	Dec-1989	Apr-1991	488	-	
11	11th Vidhan Sabha	Net Ram	Bharatiya Janata Party	Jun-1991	Dec-1992	533	-	
12	12th Vidhan Sabha	Chetram Pasi	Indian National Congress	Dec-1993	Oct-1995	693	-	
13	13th Vidhan Sabha	Chetram Pasi	Indian National Congress	Oct-1996	May-2002	1,967	-	
14	14th Vidhan Sabha	Mithlesh Kumar	Independent	Feb-2002	May-2007	1,902	-	
15	15th Vidhan Sabha	Mithlesh Kumar	Samajwadi Party	May-2007	Mar-2012	1,762	-	
16	16th Vidhan Sabha	Sakuntla Devi	Samajwadi Party	Mar-2012	Mar-2017	-	-	
17	17th Vidhan Sabha	Chetram Pasi	Bharatiya Janata Party	Mar-2017	Mar-2022			
18	18th Vidhan Sabha	Chetram Pasi	Bharatiya Janata Party	Mar-2022	Incumbent	-		

== Election results ==
=== 2027 ===
2027 Uttar Pradesh Legislative Assembly election: Powayan
Party	Candidate	Votes	%	±%
INDIA				
NDA				
BSP				
NOTA	None of the above			
Majority				
Turnout				
gain from		Swing		

=== 2022 ===
2022 Uttar Pradesh Legislative Assembly Election: Powayan
Party	Candidate	Votes	%	±%
BJP	Chetram Pasi	129,785	55.62	▲0.37
SP	Upendra Pal Singh	78,207	33.52	▲9.87
BSP	Udayveer Singh	16,799	7.2	▼9.73
INC	Anuj Kumri	2,493	1.07	
NOTA	None of the above	1,367	0.59	▼0.32
Majority		51,578	22.1	▼9.5
Turnout		233,325	60.31	▼3.07
BJP hold		Swing		

=== 2017 ===
2017 General Elections: Powayan
Party	Candidate	Votes	%	±%
BJP	Chetram Pasi	126,635	55.25	
SP	Shakuntla Devi	54,218	23.65	
BSP	Gurbachan Lal	38,797	16.93	
NOTA	None of the above	2,065	0.91	
Majority		72,417	31.6	
Turnout		229,205	63.38	

=== 2012 ===
2012 General Elections: Powayan
Party	Candidate	Votes	%	±%
SP	Sakuntla Devi	59,871	28.78	−
BSP	Arun Kumar Sagar	50,973	24.5	−
INC	Chetram Pasi	50,551	24.3	−
	Remainder 13 candidates	46,665	22.42	−
Majority		8,898	4.28	−
Turnout		208,060	65.3	−
SP hold		Swing		

== See also ==
- Tilhar Assembly constituency
- Shahjahanpur district
- Shahjahanpur Lok Sabha constituency
- Sixteenth Legislative Assembly of Uttar Pradesh
- Uttar Pradesh Legislative Assembly
- Vidhan Bhawan
