= Bhinga Assembly constituency =

Constituency of the Uttar Pradesh legislative assembly in India

Coordinates: 27.70°N 81.93°E

Bhinga
- Constituency No. 289 for the Uttar Pradesh Legislative Assembly

Constituency details
- Country: India
- Region: North India
- State: Uttar Pradesh
- District: Shravasti
- Total electors: 3,93,315
- Reservation: None

Member of Legislative Assembly
- 18th Uttar Pradesh Legislative Assembly
- Incumbent Indrani Devi
- Party: SP
- Elected year: 2022

Bhinga is a constituency of the Uttar Pradesh Legislative Assembly covering the city of Bhinga in the Shravasti district of Uttar Pradesh, India.

Bhinga is one of five assembly constituencies in the Shravasti Lok Sabha constituency.

== Members of Legislative Assembly ==
Year	Member	Party
1962	Mannu Singh	Swatantra Party
1967	Kamla Prasad Varma	Bharatiya Jana Sangh
1969	Chandramani Kant Singh	Indian National Congress
1974	Kamla Prasad Varma	Bharatiya Jana Sangh
1977	Kamla Prasad Varma	Janata Party
1980	Khursed Ahmad	Independent
1985	Khursed Ahmad	Independent
1989	Chandramani Kant Singh	Independent
1991	Chandramani Kant Singh	Bharatiya Janata Party
1993	Chandramani Kant Singh	Bharatiya Janata Party
1996	Chandramani Kant Singh	Bharatiya Janata Party
2002	Chandramani Kant Singh	Bharatiya Janata Party
2007	Daddan Mishra	Bahujan Samaj Party
2012	Indrani Devi	Samajwadi Party
2017	Mohammad Aslam	Bahujan Samaj Party
2022	Indrani Devi	Samajwadi Party

== Election results ==
=== 2027 ===
2027 Uttar Pradesh Legislative Assembly election: Bhinga
Party	Candidate	Votes	%	±%
AIMIM	Haji dadan khan			
NDA				
INDIA				
BSP				
Majority				
Turnout				
gain from		Swing		

=== 2022 ===
2022 Uttar Pradesh Legislative Assembly election: Bhinga
Party	Candidate	Votes	%	±%
SP	Indrani Devi	103,661	44.85	+19.15
BJP	Padamsen Chaudhary	90,087	38.98	+7.97
BSP	Alimuddin Ahmed	21,547	9.32	−24.39
AIMIM	Ashiya	4,073	1.76	
INC	Gajala Chaudhry	3,131	1.35	
NOTA	None of the above	3,551	1.54	−0.61
Majority		13,574	5.87	+3.17
Turnout		231,104	58.76	−4.34
SP gain from BSP		Swing		

=== 2017 ===
Bahujan Samaj Party candidate Mohammad Aslam won in 2017 Uttar Pradesh Legislative Elections defeating Bhartiya Janta Party candidate ALEKSHENDRA KANT SINGH by a margin of 6,090 votes.

2017 General Elections: Bhinga
Party	Candidate	Votes	%	±%
BSP	Mohammad Aslam	76,040	33.71	
BJP	Alekshendra Kant Singh	69,950	31.01	
SP	Indrani Devi	57,986	25.7	
Independent	Ram Abhilakh	7,423	3.29	
Bharatiya Subhash Sena	Mansharam	3,141	1.39	
NOTA	None of the above	4,746	2.15	
Majority		6,090	2.7	
Turnout		225,590	63.1	
BSP gain from SP		Swing		

=== 2012 ===
2012 General Elections: Bhinga
Party	Candidate	Votes	%	±%
SP	Indrani Devi	65,365		
INC	MUHAMMAD ASLAM	58,538		
BJP	DADDAN MISHRA	45,264		
BSP	A. RAHEEM KHAN	22,114		
	Remainder 9 candidates	14,792		
Majority		6,827		
Turnout		2,06,073		
SP gain from BSP		Swing		
