= Gandhi Faiz-E-Aam College =

Coordinates: 27.89°N 79.92°E

G.F. College, Shahjahanpur
- Civil Lines, Shahjahanpur

Information
- Motto: Sport and Study
- Established: 1947
- Founder: Maulana Fazl-Ur-Rahman Khan
- Principal: Prof. Mohsin Hasan khan
- Colours: Progressive Green and Social White
- Affiliations: M.J.P. Rohilkhand University
- Named for: Mahatma Gandhi, Father of Nation
- Website: G. F. College

Gandhi Faiz-E-Aam (Post Graduate) College, Shahjahanpur is a Multi-streamed college in India. This College was established in 1947 by Maulana Fazl-Ur-Rahman Khan. Normally it is famous by its abbreviation G. F. College. It is post graduate college and affiliated to Mahatma Jyotiba Phule Rohilkhand University, Bareilly. It was started with the object of imparting modern education to the students in a manner that conserves their religion, language, script and culture. The college is owned and managed by "Muslim Educational Society, Shahjahanpur", a charitable religious society

This institution is situated in Shahjahanpur a district of Uttar Pradesh in the Bareilly division. It is equipped with laboratories, lecture rooms, central library, wooden badminton courts, auditorium, cultural and heritage research centre and extensive playgrounds for football, hockey, cricket with athletics, and a computer lab.

== Faculties ==
=== Faculty of Arts ===
Faculty of Arts comprises following departments

1. Department of Arabic
2. Department of English
3. Department of Hindi
4. Department of Persian
5. Department of Urdu
6. Department of Drawing & Painting
7. Department of Economics
8. Department of Education
9. Department of History
10. Department of Geography
11. Department of Philosophy
12. Department of Psychology
13. Department of Sociology
14. Department of Journalism & Mass Communication
15. Department of Social Work
16. Department of Library & Information Science.

=== Faculty of Science ===
1. Department of Botany
2. Department of Chemistry
3. Department of Mathematics
4. Department of Statistics
5. Department of Zoology
6. Department of Bio-Technology & Microbiology
7. Department of Physics

=== Faculty of Commerce ===
1. Department of Commerce
2. Department of Business Administration

=== Faculty of Education ===
1. Department of Education
2. Department of B.Ed.
3. Department of M.Ed.
4. Department of D.El.Ed (B.T.C)

=== Faculty of IT ===
1. Department of Computer Science
