= Milkipur Assembly constituency =

Constituency of the Uttar Pradesh legislative assembly in India

Coordinates: 26.59°N 81.91°E

Milkipur
- Constituency No. 273 for the Uttar Pradesh Legislative Assembly

Constituency details
- Country: India
- Region: North India
- State: Uttar Pradesh
- District: Ayodhya
- Lok Sabha constituency: Faizabad
- Total electors: 358,203
- Reservation: SC

Member of Legislative Assembly
- 18th Uttar Pradesh Legislative Assembly
- Incumbent Chandrabhanu Paswan
- Party: BJP
- Elected year: 2025
- Preceded by: Awadhesh Prasad

Milkipur Assembly constituency is a constituency of the Uttar Pradesh Legislative Assembly covering the city of Milkipur in the Ayodhya district of Uttar Pradesh, India.

Milkipur is one of five assembly constituencies in the Faizabad Lok Sabha constituency.

== Members of the Legislative Assembly ==
Year	Member	Party
1967	Ramlal Mishra	Indian National Congress
1969	Harinath Tiwari	Bharatiya Jana Sangh
1974	Dharam Chandra	Indian National Congress
1977	Mitrasen Yadav	Communist Party of India
1980	Mitrasen Yadav	Communist Party of India
1985	Mitrasen Yadav	Communist Party of India
1989	Brij Bhusan Mani Tripathi	Indian National Congress
1991	Mathura Prasad Tewari	Bharatiya Janata Party
1993	Mitrasen Yadav	Communist Party of India
1996	Mitrasen Yadav	Samajwadi Party
1998^	Ram Chandra Yadav	Samajwadi Party
2002	Anand Sen Yadav	Samajwadi Party
2004^	Ram Chandra Yadav	Samajwadi Party
2007	Anand Sen Yadav	Bahujan Samaj Party
2012	Awadhesh Prasad	Samajwadi Party
2017	Baba Gorakhnath	Bharatiya Janata Party
2022	Awadhesh Prasad	Samajwadi Party
2025^	Chandrabhanu Paswan	Bharatiya Janata Party

== Election results ==
=== 2027 ===
2027 Uttar Pradesh Legislative Assembly election: Milkipur
Party	Candidate	Votes	%	±%
INDIA				
NDA				
BSP				
NOTA	None of the above			
Majority				
Turnout				
gain from		Swing		

=== 2025 bypoll ===
Uttar Pradesh Legislative Assembly by-election, 2025: Milkipur
Party	Candidate	Votes	%	±%
BJP	Chandrabhanu Paswan	146,397	60.17	▲17.97
SP	Ajeet Prasad	84,687	34.81	▼13.59
ASP(KR)	Santosh Kumar Chowdhary	5,459	2.24	new
NOTA	None of the Above	1,361	0.56	0.35
Majority		61,710	25.36	+19.2
Turnout		243,317	67.92	+7.48
BJP gain from SP		Swing		

=== 2022 ===
Samajwadi Party candidate Avdhesh Prasad won in the 2022 Uttar Pradesh Legislative Elections, defeating Bharatiya Janata Party candidate Gorakhnath Pasi by a margin of 14000 votes.

2022 Uttar Pradesh Legislative Assembly election: Milkipur
Party	Candidate	Votes	%	±%
SP	Awadhesh Prasad	103,905	47.99	+18.63
BJP	Baba Gorakhnath	90,567	41.83	−1.68
BSP	Mira Devi	14,427	6.66	−16.37
INC	Neelam Kori	3,166	1.46	
NOTA	None of the above	1,960	0.91	−0.47
Majority		13,338	6.16	−7.99
Turnout		216,515	60.44	+1.98
SP gain from BJP		Swing		

=== 2017 ===
2017 Uttar Pradesh Legislative Assembly election: Milkipur
Party	Candidate	Votes	%	±%
BJP	Baba Gorakhnath	86,960	43.51	
SP	Awadhesh Prasad	58,684	29.36	
BSP	Ramgopal	46,027	23.03	
NOTA	None of the above	2,727	1.38	
Majority		28,276	14.15	
Turnout		199,866	58.46	
BJP gain from SP		Swing	BJP	
