= Chandrabhanu Paswan =

Indian politician

Member of Uttar Pradesh Legislative Assembly
- Incumbent
- Assumed office 8 February 2025
- Preceded by: Awadhesh Prasad
- Constituency: Milkipur

Personal details
- Party: Bharatiya Janta Party
- Occupation: Politician

Chandrabhanu Paswan is an Indian politician from Uttar Pradesh. He is a member of the Uttar Pradesh Legislative Assembly from 2025 representing Milkipur as a member of BJP.
