= Awadhesh Prasad =

Indian politician (born 1945)

Member of Panel of Chairpersons (Lok Sabha)
- Incumbent
- Assumed office 31 July 2025 Serving with Sandhya Ray, Dilip Saikia, Jagdambika Pal, Krishna Prasad Tenneti, Kakoli Ghosh Dastidar, A. Raja, P. C. Mohan, N. K. Premachandran, Selja Kumari

Member of Parliament, Lok Sabha
- Incumbent
- Assumed office 4 June 2024
- Ministry & Departments: Social Welfare; SC/ST Welfare
- Preceded by: Lallu Singh, BJP
- Constituency: Faizabad, Uttar Pradesh

Cabinet Minister in Uttar Pradesh
- Chief Minister: Mulayam Singh Yadav
- Ministry & Departments: Prison; Homeguard's; Political Pension
- In office 1993–1995
- Chief Minister: Mulayam Singh Yadav
- Ministry & Departments: Social Welfare; Harijan Kalyan

Minister of State in Uttar Pradesh
- In office 1989–1991
- Chief Minister: Ram Naresh Yadav (1977-1979); Banarasi Das (1979-1980)
- Ministry & Departments: General Administration (1977-1979); Rural Development (1979-1980)
- In office 1977–1980

Member of Uttar Pradesh Legislative Assembly
- In office 10 March 2022 – 11 June 2024
- Preceded by: Anand Sen Yadav, SP
- Succeeded by: Baba Gorakhnath, BJP
- Constituency: Milkipur
- In office 1993–2012
- Preceded by: Ramu Priyadarshi, BJP
- Succeeded by: Constituency abolished
- Constituency: Sohawal
- In office 1985–1991
- Preceded by: Madho Prasad, INC(I)
- Succeeded by: Ramu Priyadarshi, BJP
- Constituency: Sohawal
- In office 1977–1980
- Preceded by: Hub Raj, INC
- Succeeded by: Madho Prasad, INC(I)
- Constituency: Sohawal

Personal details
- Born: 31 July 1945 (age 81) Bikapur, United Provinces, British India (present-day Uttar Pradesh, India)
- Party: Samajwadi Party
- Spouse: Sona Devi (m. 1972)
- Children: 7
- Education: Lucknow University (LL.B, 1968); DAV College, Kanpur, Agra University (M.A, 1966)

Awadhesh Prasad (born 31 July 1945) is an Indian politician who is a founding member of the Samajwadi Party (SP) and an MP in the 18th Lok Sabha representing Faizabad. He is presently the general secretary of the national executive of SP. He has been a nine time MLA elected from the erstwhile Sohawal (SC) constituency in 1977, 1985, 1989, 1993, 1996, 2002 and 2007 and from Milkipur (SC) in 2012 and 2022. He has become a minister for six times in the Government of Uttar Pradesh and been a cabinet minister in four of them.

== Political career ==
Prasad, who comes from Pasi Dalit community, began his political career at the age of 21. He was the Ayodhya district co-convener of the anti-Emergency Sangarsh Samiti. He was also the polling agent of the Lok Dal at Amethi during the 1977 Indian general election. He became the national secretary and was inducted into the central parliamentary board when the Samajwadi Party was founded in 1992. In the party, he has generally functioned as an organisation man since then.

He became minister in the Janata Party governments of Ram Naresh Yadav and Babu Banarasi Das and in the Samajwadi Party governments of Mulayam Singh Yadav and Akhilesh Yadav. He has a close association with the party president Akhilesh Yadav and was one of the few veteran leaders to have sided with him during the pre-2017 election leadership contest within the party.

In the 2024 Indian general election Prasad won as the Member of Parliament from the Faizabad Lok Sabha constituency. This win has been seen as of deep interest within the 2024 Indian general election because it encompasses the city of Ayodhya where resides the Ram Temple which was set-up in the previous term (2019-2024). Though, the BJP led from Ayodhya Assembly constituency, it failed to win the seat. Analysts credited his win to failure of BJP's Abki Baar 400 Paar slogan and Samajwadi Party's strategy of leveraging social politics by capitalizing on the significant OBC voter base, including Kurmis and Yadavs, aligning OBCs, Dalits, and Muslims to edge out the BJP.

== Electoral record ==
=== Legislative Assembly ===
Year	Party	Constituency Name	Result	Votes gained	Vote share%	Margin
1974	BKD	Sohawal	Lost	18,879	34.70%	689
1977	JP	Sohawal	Won	28,090	58.42%	10,578
1980	JP(S)	Sohawal	Lost	21,932	40.72%	4,071
1985	LD	Sohawal	Won	27,373	46.29%	9,147
1989	JD	Sohawal	Won	29,413	33.91%	10,032
1991	JP	Sohawal	Lost	22,047	24.90%	9,643
1993	SP	Sohawal	Won	59,115	51.77%	16,496
1996	SP	Sohawal	Won	44,399	35.17%	3,407
2002	SP	Sohawal	Won	43,398	35.36%	8,156
2007	SP	Sohawal	Won	48,624	33.08%	9,871
2012	SP	Milkipur	Won	73,804	42.24%	34,237
2017	SP	Milkipur	Lost	58,684	29.77%	28,276
2022	SP	Milkipur	Won	103,905	47.99%	13,338

=== Lok Sabha ===
Year	Party	Constituency Name	Result	Votes gained	Vote share%	Margin
1996	SP	Akbarpur	Lost	169,046	27.12%	30,749
2024	SP	Faizabad (Ayodhya)	Won	554,289	48.59%	54,567
