= 18th Uttar Pradesh Assembly =

Assembly term of a Uttar Pradesh Legislative Assembly, India constituted in 2022

←	17th Uttar Pradesh Assembly	2027 Uttar Pradesh Assembly	→

Overview
- Legislative body: Uttar Pradesh Legislative Assembly
- Meeting place: Vidhan Bhawan
- Term: 23 May 2022 –
- Election: 2022 Uttar Pradesh Legislative Assembly election
- Government: NDA
- Opposition: SP+
- Website: Official website
- Members: 403
- Chief Minister: Yogi Adityanath
- Deputy Chief Ministers: Brajesh Pathak; Keshav Prasad Maurya
- Speaker of the Assembly: Satish Mahana
- Leader of the Opposition: Mata Prasad Pandey
- Party control: Bharatiya Janata Party

The Eighteenth Uttar Pradesh Assembly (Eighteenth Vidhan Sabha of Uttar Pradesh) is formed by the members elected in the 2022 Uttar Pradesh Legislative Assembly election. Elections for 403 seats of the state, were conducted in seven phases from 10 February 2022 to 7 March 2022 by the Election Commission of India. The votes were counted and results were declared on 10 March 2022.

Satish Mahana was elected as the speaker of the assembly.

== Notable positions ==
S.No	Position	Portrait	Name	Party	Constituency	Office Taken
1	Speaker		Satish Mahana	Bharatiya Janata Party	Maharajpur	29 March 2022
2	Deputy Speaker	Vacant				
3	Leader of the House		Yogi Adityanath (Chief Minister)	Bharatiya Janata Party	Gorakhpur Urban	25 March 2022
4	Deputy Leader of the House		Suresh Kumar Khanna (Legislative Affairs and Finance Minister)	Bharatiya Janata Party	Shahjahanpur	25 March 2022
5	Leader of Opposition		Mata Prasad Pandey	Samajwadi Party	Itwa	28 July 2024

== Composition ==

Alliance	Political party	No. of MLAs	Leader of the party
Government; NDA; Seats: 292	Bharatiya Janata Party	255	Yogi Adityanath (Chief Minister)
Government; NDA; Seats: 292	Apna Dal (Soneylal)	13	Ram Niwas Verma
Government; NDA; Seats: 292	Rashtriya Lok Dal	9	Rajpal Singh Baliyan
Government; NDA; Seats: 292	Suheldev Bharatiya Samaj Party	6	Om Prakash Rajbhar
Government; NDA; Seats: 292	NISHAD Party	5	Anil Kumar Tripathi
Government; NDA; Seats: 292	Independents – SP Rebels	4	—N/a
Opposition; SP+ Seats: 102	Samajwadi Party	100	Mata Prasad Pandey (Leader of Opposition)
Opposition; SP+ Seats: 102	Indian National Congress	2	Aradhana Mishra
Others; Seats: 2	Jansatta Dal (Loktantrik)	2	Raghuraj Pratap Singh
Vacant; Seats: 7	Shikarpur; Fatehabad; Faridpur; Ghosi; Duddhi; Nizamabad; Rasara	7	—N/a
Total		403	

== Members of Legislative Assembly ==
District	No.	Constituency	Name	Party	Alliance	Remarks
Saharanpur	1	Behat	Umar Ali Khan	SP	SP+	
Saharanpur	2	Nakur	Mukesh Choudhary	BJP	NDA	
Saharanpur	3	Saharanpur Nagar	Rajiv Gumber	BJP	NDA	
Saharanpur	4	Saharanpur	Ashu Malik	SP	SP+	
Saharanpur	5	Deoband	Brijesh Singh Rawat	BJP	NDA	MOS
Saharanpur	6	Rampur Maniharan (SC)	Devendra Kumar Nim	BJP	NDA	
Saharanpur	7	Gangoh	Kirat Singh Gurjar	BJP	NDA	
Shamli	8	Kairana	Nahid Hasan	SP	SP+	
Shamli	9	Thana Bhawan	Ashraf Ali Khan	RLD	NDA	
Shamli	10	Shamli	Persann Kumar Chaudhary	RLD	NDA	
Muzaffarnagar	11	Budhana	Rajpal Singh Baliyan	RLD	NDA	
Muzaffarnagar	12	Charthawal	Pankaj Kumar Malik	SP	SP+	
Muzaffarnagar	13	Purqazi (SC)	Anil Kumar	RLD	NDA	
Muzaffarnagar	14	Muzaffarnagar	Kapil Dev Aggarwal	BJP	NDA	MOS (I/C)
Muzaffarnagar	15	Khatauli	Vikram Singh Saini	BJP	NDA	Disqualified on 7 November 2022
Muzaffarnagar	15	Khatauli	Madan Bhaiya	RLD	NDA	Elected on 8 December 2022
Muzaffarnagar	16	Meerapur	Chandan Chauhan	RLD	NDA	Elected to the 18th Lok Sabha
Muzaffarnagar	16	Meerapur	Mithlesh Pal	RLD	NDA	
Bijnor	17	Najibabad	Tasleem Ahmad	SP	SP+	
Bijnor	18	Nagina (SC)	Manoj Kumar Paras	SP	SP+	
Bijnor	19	Barhapur	Sushant Kumar	BJP	NDA	
Bijnor	20	Dhampur	Ashok Kumar Rana	BJP	NDA	
Bijnor	21	Nehtaur (SC)	Om Kumar	BJP	NDA	
Bijnor	22	Bijnor	Suchi Chaudhary	BJP	NDA	
Bijnor	23	Chandpur	Swami Omvesh	SP	SP+	
Bijnor	24	Noorpur	Ram Avtar Singh	SP	SP+	
Moradabad	25	Kanth	Kamal Akhtar	SP	SP+	
Moradabad	26	Thakurdwara	Nawab Jan	SP	SP+	
Moradabad	27	Moradabad Rural	Mohd Nasir Qureshi	SP	SP+	
Moradabad	28	Moradabad Nagar	Ritesh Kumar Gupta	BJP	NDA	
Moradabad	29	Kundarki	Zia Ur Rehman	SP	SP+	Elected to the 18th Lok Sabha
Moradabad	29	Kundarki	Ramveer Singh	BJP	NDA	Won in 2024 by-election
Moradabad	30	Bilari	Mohammed Faeem	SP	SP+	
Sambhal	31	Chandausi (SC)	Gulab Devi	BJP	NDA	MOS (I/C)
Sambhal	32	Asmoli	Pinki Singh Yadav	SP	SP+	
Sambhal	33	Sambhal	Iqbal Mehmood	SP	SP+	
Rampur	34	Suar	Abdullah Azam Khan	SP	SP+	Disqualified on 15 February 2023
Rampur	34	Suar	Shafeek Ahmed Ansari	AD(S)	NDA	Won in 2023 by-election
Rampur	35	Chamraua	Naseer Ahmad Khan	SP	SP+	
Rampur	36	Bilaspur	Baldev Singh Aulakh	BJP	NDA	MOS
Rampur	37	Rampur	Azam Khan	SP	SP+	Disqualified on 28 October 2022
Rampur	37	Rampur	Akash Saxena	BJP	NDA	Elected on 8 December 2022
Rampur	38	Milak (SC)	Rajbala	BJP	NDA	
Amroha	39	Dhanaura (SC)	Rajeev Tarara	BJP	NDA	
Amroha	40	Naugawan Sadat	Samarpal Singh	SP	SP+	
Amroha	41	Amroha	Mehboob Ali	SP	SP+	
Amroha	42	Hasanpur	Mahender Singh Khadakvanshi	BJP	NDA	
Meerut	43	Siwalkhas	Ghulam Mohammed	RLD	NDA	
Meerut	44	Sardhana	Atul Pradhan	SP	SP+	
Meerut	45	Hastinapur	Dinesh Khatik	BJP	NDA	MOS
Meerut	46	Kithore	Shahid Manzoor	SP	SP+	
Meerut	47	Meerut Cantt.	Amit Agarwal	BJP	NDA	
Meerut	48	Meerut City	Rafiq Ansari	SP	SP+	
Meerut	49	Meerut South	Somendra Tomar	BJP	NDA	MOS
Bagpat	50	Chhaprauli	Ajay Kumar	RLD	NDA	
Bagpat	51	Baraut	Krishan Pal Malik	BJP	NDA	MOS
Bagpat	52	Baghpat	Yogesh Dhama	BJP	NDA	
Ghaziabad	53	Loni	Nandkishor Gurjar	BJP	NDA	
Ghaziabad	54	Muradnagar	Ajit Pal Tyagi	BJP	NDA	
Ghaziabad	55	Sahibabad	Sunil Kumar Sharma	BJP	NDA	
Ghaziabad	56	Ghaziabad	Atul Garg	BJP	NDA	Elected to the 18th Lok Sabha
Ghaziabad	56	Ghaziabad	Sanjeev Sharma	BJP	NDA	Won in 2024 by-election
Ghaziabad	57	Modi Nagar	Manju Shivach	BJP	NDA	
Hapur	58	Dholana	Dharmesh Singh Tomar	BJP	NDA	
Hapur	59	Hapur	Vijay Pal	BJP	NDA	
Hapur	60	Garhmukteshwar	Harendra Singh Tewatia	BJP	NDA	
Gautam Buddh Nagar	61	Noida	Pankaj Singh	BJP	NDA	
Gautam Buddh Nagar	62	Dadri	Tejpal Singh Nagar	BJP	NDA	
Gautam Buddh Nagar	63	Jewar	Dhirendra Singh	BJP	NDA	
Bulandshahr	64	Sikandrabad	Lakshmi Raj Singh	BJP	NDA	
Bulandshahr	65	Bulandshahr	Pradeep Kumar Chaudhary	BJP	NDA	
Bulandshahr	66	Syana	Devendra Singh Lodhi	BJP	NDA	
Bulandshahr	67	Anupshahr	Sanjay Kumar Sharma	BJP	NDA	
Bulandshahr	68	Debai	Chandrapal Singh	BJP	NDA	
Bulandshahr	69	Shikarpur	Anil Sharma	BJP	NDA	Died on 2 September 2026
Bulandshahr	69	Shikarpur	Vacant			
Bulandshahr	70	Khurja (SC)	Meenakshi Singh	BJP	NDA	
Aligarh	71	Khair (SC)	Anoop Pradhan	BJP	NDA	
Aligarh	71	Khair (SC)	Surender Diler	BJP	NDA	
Aligarh	72	Barauli	Thakur Jaivir Singh	BJP	NDA	
Aligarh	73	Atrauli	Sandeep Kumar Singh	BJP	NDA	MOS (I/C)
Aligarh	74	Chharra	Ravendra Pal Singh	BJP	NDA	
Aligarh	75	Koil	Anil Parashar	BJP	NDA	
Aligarh	76	Aligarh	Mukta Raja	BJP	NDA	
Aligarh	77	Iglas (SC)	Rajkumar Sahyogi	BJP	NDA	
Hathras	78	Hathras (SC)	Anjula Singh Mahaur	BJP	NDA	
Hathras	79	Sadabad	Pradeep Kumar Singh	RLD	NDA	
Hathras	80	Sikandra Rao	Birendra Singh Rana	BJP	NDA	
Mathura	81	Chhata	Chaudhary Laxmi Narayan Singh	BJP	NDA	Cabinet Minister
Mathura	82	Mant	Rajesh Chaudhary	BJP	NDA	
Mathura	83	Goverdhan	Meghshyam Singh	BJP	NDA	
Mathura	84	Mathura	Shrikant Sharma	BJP	NDA	
Mathura	85	Baldev (SC)	Pooran Prakash	BJP	NDA	
Agra	86	Etmadpur	Dharampal Singh	BJP	NDA	
Agra	87	Agra Cantt. (SC)	Girraj Singh Dharmesh	BJP	NDA	
Agra	88	Agra South	Yogendra Upadhyaya	BJP	NDA	Cabinet Minister
Agra	89	Agra North	Purshottam Khandelwal	BJP	NDA	
Agra	90	Agra Rural (SC)	Baby Rani Maurya	BJP	NDA	Cabinet Minister
Agra	91	Fatehpur Sikri	Chaudhary Babulal	BJP	NDA	
Agra	92	Kheragarh	Bhagvan Singh Kushwaha	BJP	NDA	
Agra	93	Fatehabad	Chotelal Verma	BJP	NDA	Died on 24 September 2026
Agra	93	Fatehabad	Vacant			
Agra	94	Bah	Rani Pakshalika Singh	BJP	NDA	
Firozabad	95	Tundla (SC)	Prempal Singh Dhangar	BJP	NDA	
Firozabad	96	Jasrana	Sachin Yadav	SP	SP+	
Firozabad	97	Firozabad	Manish Asija	BJP	NDA	
Firozabad	98	Shikohabad	Mukesh Verma	SP	SP+	
Firozabad	99	Sirsaganj	Sarvesh Singh Yadav	SP	SP+	
Kasganj	100	Kasganj	Devendra Singh Rajput	BJP	NDA	
Kasganj	101	Amanpur	Hariom Verma	BJP	NDA	
Kasganj	102	Patiyali	Nadira Sultan	SP	SP+	
Etah	103	Aliganj	Satyapal Singh Rathore	BJP	NDA	
Etah	104	Etah	Vipin Kumar David	BJP	NDA	
Etah	105	Marhara	Virendra Singh Lodhi	BJP	NDA	
Etah	106	Jalesar (SC)	Sanjeev Kumar Diwakar	BJP	NDA	
Mainpuri	107	Mainpuri	Jaiveer Singh	BJP	NDA	Cabinet Minister
Mainpuri	108	Bhongaon	Ram Naresh Agnihotri	BJP	NDA	
Mainpuri	109	Kishni (SC)	Brajesh Katheriya	SP	SP+	
Mainpuri	110	Karhal	Akhilesh Yadav	SP	SP+	Resigned from Karhal seat on 11 June 2024.
Mainpuri	110	Karhal	Tej Pratap Singh Yadav	SP	SP+	
Sambhal	111	Gunnaur	Ramkhiladi Singh Yadav	SP	SP+	
Budaun	112	Bisauli (SC)	Ashutosh Maurya	SP	SP+	
Budaun	113	Sahaswan	Brajesh Yadav	SP	SP+	
Budaun	114	Bilsi	Harish Chandra Shakya	BJP	NDA	
Budaun	115	Badaun	Mahesh Chandra Gupta	BJP	NDA	
Budaun	116	Shekhupur	Himanshu Yadav	SP	SP+	
Budaun	117	Dataganj	Rajeev Kumar Singh	BJP	NDA	
Bareilly	118	Baheri	Ataurrehman	SP	SP+	
Bareilly	119	Meerganj	D. C. Verma	BJP	NDA	
Bareilly	120	Bhojipura	Shazil Islam Ansari	SP	SP+	
Bareilly	121	Nawabganj	M. P. Arya	BJP	NDA	
Bareilly	122	Faridpur (SC)	Shyam Bihari Lal	BJP	NDA	Died on 2 January 2026
Bareilly	122	Faridpur (SC)	Vacant			
Bareilly	123	Bithari Chainpur	Raghavendra Sharma	BJP	NDA	
Bareilly	124	Bareilly	Arun Kumar Saxena	BJP	NDA	MOS (I/C)
Bareilly	125	Bareilly Cantt	Sanjeev Agarwal	BJP	NDA	
Bareilly	126	Aonla	Dharmpal Singh	BJP	NDA	Cabinet Minister
Pilibhit	127	Pilibhit	Sanjay Singh Gangwar	BJP	NDA	MOS
Pilibhit	128	Barkhera	Swami Pravaktanand	BJP	NDA	
Pilibhit	129	Puranpur (SC)	Babu Ram Paswan	BJP	NDA	
Pilibhit	130	Bisalpur	Vivek Kumar Verma	BJP	NDA	
Shahjahanpur	131	Katra	Veer Vikram Singh	BJP	NDA	
Shahjahanpur	132	Jalalabad	Hari Prakash Verma	BJP	NDA	
Shahjahanpur	133	Tilhar	Salona Kushwaha	BJP	NDA	
Shahjahanpur	134	Powayan (SC)	Chetram Pasi	BJP	NDA	
Shahjahanpur	135	Shahjahanpur	Suresh Kumar Khanna	BJP	NDA	Cabinet Minister
Shahjahanpur	136	Dadraul	Manvendra Singh	BJP	NDA	Died on 5 January 2024
Shahjahanpur	136	Dadraul	Arvind Kumar Singh	BJP	NDA	Elected in Bypoll
Lakhimpur Kheri	137	Palia	Harvinder Kumar Sahani	BJP	NDA	
Lakhimpur Kheri	138	Nighasan	Shashank Verma	BJP	NDA	
Lakhimpur Kheri	139	Gola Gokarnnath	Arvind Giri	BJP	NDA	Died on 6 September 2022
Lakhimpur Kheri	139	Gola Gokarnnath	Aman Giri	BJP	NDA	Elected in Bypoll
Lakhimpur Kheri	140	Sri Nagar (SC)	Manju Tyagi	BJP	NDA	
Lakhimpur Kheri	141	Dhaurahra	Vinod Shankar Avasthi	BJP	NDA	
Lakhimpur Kheri	142	Lakhimpur	Yogesh Verma	BJP	NDA	
Lakhimpur Kheri	143	Kasta (SC)	Saurabh Singh	BJP	NDA	
Lakhimpur Kheri	144	Mohammadi	Lokendra Pratap Singh	BJP	NDA	
Sitapur	145	Maholi	Shashank Trivedi	BJP	NDA	
Sitapur	146	Sitapur	Rakesh Rathour Guru	BJP	NDA	MOS
Sitapur	147	Hargaon (SC)	Suresh Rahi	BJP	NDA	MOS
Sitapur	148	Laharpur	Anil Kumar Verma	SP	SP+	
Sitapur	149	Biswan	Nirmal Verma	BJP	NDA	
Sitapur	150	Sevata	Gyan Tiwari	BJP	NDA	
Sitapur	151	Mahmoodabad	Asha Maurya	BJP	NDA	
Sitapur	152	Sidhauli (SC)	Manish Rawat	BJP	NDA	
Sitapur	153	Misrikh (SC)	Ram Krishna Bhargava	BJP	NDA	
Hardoi	154	Sawayazpur	Madhvendra Pratap Singh	BJP	NDA	
Hardoi	155	Shahabad	Rajani Tiwari	BJP	NDA	MOS
Hardoi	156	Hardoi	Nitin Agarwal	BJP	NDA	MOS (I/C)
Hardoi	157	Gopamau (SC)	Shyam Prakash	BJP	NDA	
Hardoi	158	Sandi (SC)	Prabhash Kumar	BJP	NDA	
Hardoi	159	Bilgram-Mallanwan	Ashish Kumar Singh	BJP	NDA	
Hardoi	160	Balamau (SC)	Ram Pal Verma	BJP	NDA	
Hardoi	161	Sandila	Alka Singh Arkvanshi	BJP	NDA	
Unnao	162	Bangarmau	Shrikant Katiyar	BJP	NDA	
Unnao	163	Safipur (SC)	Bamba Lal Diwakar	BJP	NDA	
Unnao	164	Mohan (SC)	Brijesh Kumar Rawat	BJP	NDA	
Unnao	165	Unnao	Pankaj Gupta	BJP	NDA	
Unnao	166	Bhagwantnagar	Ashutosh Shukla	BJP	NDA	
Unnao	167	Purwa	Anil Singh	BJP	NDA	
Lucknow	168	Malihabad (SC)	Jai Devi	BJP	NDA	
Lucknow	169	Bakshi Kaa Talab	Yogesh Shukla	BJP	NDA	
Lucknow	170	Sarojini Nagar	Rajeshwar Singh	BJP	NDA	
Lucknow	171	Lucknow West	Armaan Khan	SP	SP+	
Lucknow	172	Lucknow North	Neeraj Bora	BJP	NDA	
Lucknow	173	Lucknow East	Ashutosh Tandon	BJP	NDA	Died on 9 November 2023
Lucknow	173	Lucknow East	O. P. Srivastava	BJP	NDA	Elected on 4 June 2024
Lucknow	174	Lucknow Central	Ravidas Mehrotra	SP	SP+	
Lucknow	175	Lucknow Cantt	Brajesh Pathak	BJP	NDA	Deputy Chief Minister
Lucknow	176	Mohanlalganj (SC)	Amresh Kumar	BJP	NDA	
Raebareli	177	Bachhrawan (SC)	Shyam Sunder Bharti	SP	SP+	
Amethi	178	Tiloi	Mayankeshwar Sharan Singh	BJP	NDA	MOS
Raebareli	179	Harchandpur	Rahul Lodhi	SP	SP+	
Raebareli	180	Rae Bareli	Aditi Singh	BJP	NDA	
Raebareli	181	Salon (SC)	Ashok Kori	BJP	NDA	
Raebareli	182	Sareni	Devendra Pratap Singh	SP	SP+	
Raebareli	183	Unchahar	Manoj Kumar Pandey	BJP	NDA	Switched from SP to BJP in 2024
Amethi	184	Jagdishpur (SC)	Suresh Pasi	BJP	NDA	
Amethi	185	Gauriganj	Rakesh Pratap Singh	IND	NDA	Expelled from SP in 2025
Amethi	186	Amethi	Maharaji Prajapati	SP	SP+	
Sultanpur	187	Isauli	Mohammad Tahir Khan	SP	SP+	
Sultanpur	188	Sultanpur	Vinod Singh	BJP	NDA	
Sultanpur	189	Sadar	Raj Prasad Upadhyay	BJP	NDA	
Sultanpur	190	Lambhua	Sitaram Verma	BJP	NDA	
Sultanpur	191	Kadipur (SC)	Rajesh Gautam	BJP	NDA	
Farrukhabad	192	Kaimganj (SC)	Dr. Surabhi Singh	AD(S)	NDA	
Farrukhabad	193	Amritpur	Sushil Kumar Shakya	BJP	NDA	
Farrukhabad	194	Farrukhabad	Sunil Dutt Dwivedi	BJP	NDA	
Farrukhabad	195	Bhojpur	Nagendra Singh Rathore	BJP	NDA	
Kannauj	196	Chhibramau	Archana Pandey	BJP	NDA	
Kannauj	197	Tirwa	Kailash Singh Rajput	BJP	NDA	
Kannauj	198	Kannauj (SC)	Asim Arun	BJP	NDA	MOS (I/C)
Etawah	199	Jaswantnagar	Shivpal Singh Yadav	SP	SP+	
Etawah	200	Etawah	Sarita Bhadauria	BJP	NDA	
Etawah	201	Bharthana (SC)	Raghvendra Kumar Singh	SP	SP+	
Auraiya	202	Bidhuna	Rekha Verma	SP	SP+	
Auraiya	203	Dibiyapur	Pradeep Kumar Yadav	SP	SP+	
Auraiya	204	Auraiya (SC)	Gudiya Katheriya	BJP	NDA	
Kanpur Dehat	205	Rasulabad (SC)	Poonam Sankhwar	BJP	NDA	
Kanpur Dehat	206	Akbarpur-Raniya	Pratibha Shukla	BJP	NDA	MOS
Kanpur Dehat	207	Sikandra	Ajit Singh Pal	BJP	NDA	MOS (I/C)
Kanpur Dehat	208	Bhognipur	Rakesh Sachan	BJP	NDA	Cabinet Minister
Kanpur Nagar	209	Bilhaur (SC)	Rahul Bachha Sonkar	BJP	NDA	
Kanpur Nagar	210	Bithoor	Abhijeet Singh Sanga	BJP	NDA	
Kanpur Nagar	211	Kalyanpur	Neelima Katiyar	BJP	NDA	
Kanpur Nagar	212	Govindnagar	Surendra Maithani	BJP	NDA	
Kanpur Nagar	213	Sishamau	Haji Irfan Solanki	SP	SP+	
Kanpur Nagar	213	Sishamau	Naseem Solanki	SP	SP+	
Kanpur Nagar	214	Arya Nagar	Amitabh Bajpai	SP	SP+	
Kanpur Nagar	215	Kidwai Nagar	Mahesh Trivedi	BJP	NDA	
Kanpur Nagar	216	Kanpur Cantt	Mohammad Hassan Roomi	SP	SP+	
Kanpur Nagar	217	Maharajpur	Satish Mahana	BJP	NDA	Speaker
Kanpur Nagar	218	Ghatampur (SC)	Saroj Kureel	AD(S)	NDA	
Jalaun	219	Madhaugarh	Moolchandra Singh	BJP	NDA	
Jalaun	220	Kalpi	Vinod Chaturvedi	SP	SP+	
Jalaun	221	Orai (SC)	Gauri Shankar Verma	BJP	NDA	
Jhansi	222	Babina	Rajeev Singh Parichha	BJP	NDA	
Jhansi	223	Jhansi Nagar	Ravi Sharma	BJP	NDA	
Jhansi	224	Mauranipur (SC)	Rashmi Arya	AD(S)	NDA	
Jhansi	225	Garautha	Jawahar Lal Rajput	BJP	NDA	
Lalitpur	226	Lalitpur	Ramratan Kushwaha	BJP	NDA	
Lalitpur	227	Mehroni (SC)	Manohar Lal Panth	BJP	NDA	MOS
Hamirpur	228	Hamirpur	Manoj Kumar Prajapati	BJP	NDA	
Hamirpur	229	Rath (SC)	Manisha Anuragi	BJP	NDA	
Mahoba	230	Mahoba	Rakesh Kumar Goswami	BJP	NDA	
Mahoba	231	Charkhari	Brijbhushan Rajpoot	BJP	NDA	
Banda	232	Tindwari	Ramkesh Nishad	BJP	NDA	MOS
Banda	233	Baberu	Vishambhar Singh Yadav	SP	SP+	
Banda	234	Naraini (SC)	Ommani Verma	BJP	NDA	
Banda	235	Banda	Prakash Dwivedi	BJP	NDA	
Chitrakoot	236	Chitrakoot	Anil Pradhan	SP	SP+	
Chitrakoot	237	Manikpur	Avinash Chandra Dwivedi	AD(S)	NDA	
Fatehpur	238	Jahanabad	Rajendra Singh Patel	BJP	NDA	
Fatehpur	239	Bindki	Jai Kumar Singh Jaiki	AD(S)	NDA	
Fatehpur	240	Fatehpur	Chandra Prakash Lodhi	SP	SP+	
Fatehpur	241	Ayah Shah	Vikas Gupta	BJP	NDA	
Fatehpur	242	Husainganj	Usha Maurya	SP	SP+	
Fatehpur	243	Khaga (SC)	Krishna Paswan	BJP	NDA	
Pratapgarh	244	Rampur Khas	Aradhana Mishra	INC	SP+	
Pratapgarh	245	Babaganj (SC)	Vinod Saroj	JD(L)	IND	
Pratapgarh	246	Kunda	Raghuraj Pratap Singh	JD(L)	IND	
Pratapgarh	247	Bishwavnathganj	Jeet Lal Patel	AD(S)	NDA	
Pratapgarh	248	Pratapgarh	Rajendra Kumar Maurya	BJP	NDA	
Pratapgarh	249	Patti	Ram Singh Patel	SP	SP+	
Pratapgarh	250	Raniganj	Rakesh Kumar Verma	SP	SP+	
Kaushambi	251	Sirathu	Pallavi Patel	SP	SP+	
Kaushambi	251	Sirathu	Pallavi Patel	AD(K)	PDM	
Kaushambi	252	Manjhanpur (SC)	Indrajit Saroj	SP	SP+	
Kaushambi	253	Chail	Pooja Pal	IND	NDA	Expelled from SP in 2025
Prayagraj	254	Phaphamau	Guru Prasad Maurya	BJP	NDA	
Prayagraj	255	Soraon (SC)	Geeta Shastri	SP	SP+	
Prayagraj	256	Phulpur	Praveen Patel	BJP	NDA	
Prayagraj	256	Phulpur	Deepak Patel	BJP	NDA	
Prayagraj	257	Pratappur	Vijama Yadav	SP	SP+	
Prayagraj	258	Handia	Hakim Lal Bind	SP	SP+	
Prayagraj	259	Meja	Sandeep Singh Patel	SP	SP+	
Prayagraj	260	Karachhana	Piyush Ranjan Nishad	BJP	NDA	
Prayagraj	261	Prayagraj West	Sidharth Nath Singh	BJP	NDA	
Prayagraj	262	Prayagraj North	Harshvardhan Bajpai	BJP	NDA	
Prayagraj	263	Prayagraj South	Nand Gopal Gupta Nandi	BJP	NDA	Cabinet Minister
Prayagraj	264	Bara (SC)	Vachaspati	AD(S)	NDA	
Prayagraj	265	Koraon	Rajmani Kol	BJP	NDA	
Barabanki	266	Kursi	Sakendra Pratap Verma	BJP	NDA	
Barabanki	267	Ram Nagar	Fareed Mahfooz Kidwai	SP	SP+	
Barabanki	268	Barabanki	Dharamraj Singh Yadav	SP	SP+	
Barabanki	269	Zaidpur (SC)	Gaurav Kumar Rawat	SP	SP+	
Barabanki	270	Dariyabad	Satish Chandra Sharma	BJP	NDA	MOS
Ayodhya	271	Rudauli	Ram Chandra Yadav	BJP	NDA	
Barabanki	272	Haidergarh (SC)	Dinesh Rawat	BJP	NDA	
Ayodhya	273	Milkipur (SC)	Awadhesh Prasad	SP	SP+	Resigned on 11 June 2024
Ayodhya	273	Milkipur (SC)	Chandrabhanu Paswan	BJP	NDA	Elected in Bypoll
Ayodhya	274	Bikapur	Amit Singh Chauhan	BJP	NDA	
Ayodhya	275	Ayodhya	Ved Prakash Gupta	BJP	NDA	
Ayodhya	276	Goshainganj	Abhay Singh	IND	NDA	Expelled from SP in 2025
Ambedkar Nagar	277	Katehari	Dharmraj Nishad	BJP	NDA	Elected on 23 November 2024
Ambedkar Nagar	278	Tanda	Ram Murti Verma	SP	SP+	
Ambedkar Nagar	279	Alapur (SC)	Tribhuvan Dutt	SP	SP+	
Ambedkar Nagar	280	Jalalpur	Rakesh Pandey	SP	SP+	
Ambedkar Nagar	281	Akbarpur	Ram Achal Rajbhar	SP	SP+	
Bahraich	282	Balha (SC)	Saroj Sonkar	BJP	NDA	
Bahraich	283	Nanpara	Ram Niwas Verma	AD(S)	NDA	
Bahraich	284	Matera	Mariya Shah	SP	SP+	
Bahraich	285	Mahasi	Sureshwar Singh	BJP	NDA	
Bahraich	286	Bahraich	Anupama Jaiswal	BJP	NDA	
Bahraich	287	Payagpur	Subhash Tripathi	BJP	NDA	
Bahraich	288	Kaiserganj	Anand Kumar	SP	SP+	
Shravasti	289	Bhinga	Indrani Devi	SP	SP+	
Shravasti	290	Shrawasti	Ram Feran Pandey	BJP	NDA	
Balrampur	291	Tulsipur	Kailash Nath Shukla	BJP	NDA	
Balrampur	292	Gainsari	Shiv Pratap Yadav	SP	SP+	Died On 26 Jan 2024
Balrampur	292	Gainsari	Rakesh Kumar Yadav	SP	SP+	Elected in Bypoll
Balrampur	293	Utraula	Ram Pratap Verma	BJP	NDA	
Balrampur	294	Balrampur (SC)	Paltu Ram	BJP	NDA	
Gonda	295	Mehnaun	Vinay Kumar Dwivedi	BJP	NDA	
Gonda	296	Gonda	Prateek Bhushan Singh	BJP	NDA	
Gonda	297	Katra Bazar	Bawan Singh	BJP	NDA	
Gonda	298	Colonelganj	Ajay Pratap Singh	BJP	NDA	
Gonda	299	Tarabganj	Prem Narayan Pandey	BJP	NDA	
Gonda	300	Mankapur (SC)	Ramapati Shastri	BJP	NDA	Pro-tem Speaker
Gonda	301	Gaura	Prabhat Kumar Verma	BJP	NDA	
Siddharthnagar	302	Shohratgarh	Vinay Verma	AD(S)	NDA	
Siddharthnagar	303	Kapilvastu (SC)	Shyam Dhani Rahi	BJP	NDA	
Siddharthnagar	304	Bansi	Jai Pratap Singh	BJP	NDA	
Siddharthnagar	305	Itwa	Mata Prasad Pandey	SP	SP+	
Siddharthnagar	306	Domariyaganj	Saiyada Khatoon	SP	SP+	
Basti	307	Harraiya	Ajay Kumar Singh	BJP	NDA	
Basti	308	Kaptanganj	Kavindra Chaudhary	SP	SP+	
Basti	309	Rudhauli	Rajendra Prasad Chaudhary	SP	SP+	
Basti	310	Basti Sadar	Mahendra Nath Yadav	SP	SP+	
Basti	311	Mahadewa (SC)	Dudhram	SBSP	NDA	
Sant Kabir Nagar	312	Menhdawal	Anil Kumar Tripathi	NISHAD	NDA	
Sant Kabir Nagar	313	Khalilabad	Ankur Raj Tiwari	BJP	NDA	
Sant Kabir Nagar	314	Dhanghata (SC)	Ganesh Chandra Chauhan	BJP	NDA	
Maharajganj	315	Pharenda	Virendra Chaudhary	INC	SP+	
Maharajganj	316	Nautanwa	Rishi Tripathi	NISHAD	NDA	
Maharajganj	317	Siswa	Prem Sagar Patel	BJP	NDA	
Maharajganj	318	Maharajganj (SC)	Jai Mangal Kanojiya	BJP	NDA	
Maharajganj	319	Paniyara	Gyanendra Singh	BJP	NDA	
Gorakhpur	320	Caimpiyarganj	Fateh Bahadur Singh	BJP	NDA	
Gorakhpur	321	Pipraich	Mahendra Pal Singh	BJP	NDA	
Gorakhpur	322	Gorakhpur Urban	Yogi Adityanath (Chief Minister)	BJP	NDA	Leader of the House
Gorakhpur	323	Gorakhpur Rural	Bipin Singh	BJP	NDA	
Gorakhpur	324	Sahajanwa	Pradeep Shukla	BJP	NDA	
Gorakhpur	325	Khajani (SC)	Sriram Chauhan	BJP	NDA	
Gorakhpur	326	Chauri-Chaura	Sarvan Kumar Nishad	BJP	NDA	
Gorakhpur	327	Bansgaon (SC)	Vimlesh Paswan	BJP	NDA	
Gorakhpur	328	Chillupar	Rajesh Tripathi	BJP	NDA	
Kushinagar	329	Khadda	Viveka Nand Pandey	NISHAD	NDA	
Kushinagar	330	Padrauna	Manish Jaiswal	BJP	NDA	
Kushinagar	331	Tamkuhi Raj	Ashim Kumar Sarkar	BJP	NDA	
Kushinagar	332	Fazilnagar	Surendra Kumar Kushwaha	BJP	NDA	
Kushinagar	333	Kushinagar	Panchanand Pathak	BJP	NDA	
Kushinagar	334	Hata	Mohan Verma	BJP	NDA	
Kushinagar	335	Ramkola (SC)	Vinay Prakash Gond	BJP	NDA	
Deoria	336	Rudrapur	Jai Prakash Nishad	BJP	NDA	
Deoria	337	Deoria	Shalabh Mani Tripathi	BJP	NDA	
Deoria	338	Pathardeva	Surya Pratap Shahi	BJP	NDA	Cabinet Minister
Deoria	339	Rampur Karkhana	Surendra Chaurasia	BJP	NDA	
Deoria	340	Bhatpar Rani	Sabhakunwar Kushawaha	BJP	NDA	
Deoria	341	Salempur (SC)	Vijay Laxmi Gautam	BJP	NDA	MOS
Deoria	342	Barhaj	Deepak Kumar Mishra	BJP	NDA	
Azamgarh	343	Atrauliya	Sangram Yadav	SP	SP+	
Azamgarh	344	Gopalpur	Nafees Ahmad	SP	SP+	
Azamgarh	345	Sagri	Hriday Narayan Singh Patel	SP	SP+	
Azamgarh	346	Mubarakpur	Akhilesh Yadav	SP	SP+	
Azamgarh	347	Azamgarh	Durga Prasad Yadav	SP	SP+	
Azamgarh	348	Nizamabad	Alambadi	SP	SP+	Died on 22 July 2026
Azamgarh	348	Nizamabad	Vacant			
Azamgarh	349	Phoolpur Pawai	Ramakant Yadav	SP	SP+	
Azamgarh	350	Didarganj	Kamlakant Rajbhar	SP	SP+	
Azamgarh	351	Lalganj (SC)	Bechai Saroj	SP	SP+	
Azamgarh	352	Mehnagar (SC)	Puja Saroj	SP	SP+	
Mau	353	Madhuban	Ram Bilash Chauhan	BJP	NDA	
Mau	354	Ghosi	Dara Singh Chauhan	SP	SP+	Resigned on 15 July 2023.
Mau	354	Ghosi	Sudhakar Singh	SP	SP+	Elected in Bypoll; Died on 20 November 2025
Mau	354	Ghosi	Vacant			
Mau	355	Muhammadabad-Gohna (SC)	Rajendra Kumar	SP	SP+	
Mau	356	Mau	Abbas Ansari	SBSP	NDA	
Ballia	357	Belthara Road (SC)	Hansu Ram	SBSP	NDA	
Ballia	358	Rasara	Umashankar Singh	BSP	IND	Died on 5 August 2026
Ballia	358	Rasara	Vacant			
Ballia	359	Sikanderpur	Mohammed Ziauddin Rizvi	SP	SP+	
Ballia	360	Phephana	Sangram Singh	SP	SP+	
Ballia	361	Ballia Nagar	Daya Shankar Singh	BJP	NDA	MOS (I/C)
Ballia	362	Bansdih	Ketakee Singh	BJP	NDA	
Ballia	363	Bairia	Jai Prakash Anchal	SP	SP+	
Jaunpur	364	Badlapur	Ramesh Chandra Mishra	BJP	NDA	
Jaunpur	365	Shahganj	Ramesh Singh	NISHAD	NDA	
Jaunpur	366	Jaunpur	Girish Chandra Yadav	BJP	NDA	MOS (I/C)
Jaunpur	367	Malhani	Lucky Yadav	SP	SP+	
Jaunpur	368	Mungra Badshahpur	Pankaj Patel	SP	SP+	
Jaunpur	369	Machhlishahr (SC)	Ragini Sonkar	SP	SP+	
Jaunpur	370	Mariyahu	R.K. Patel	AD(S)	NDA	
Jaunpur	371	Zafrabad	Jagdish Narayan	SBSP	NDA	
Jaunpur	372	Kerakat (SC)	Tufani Saroj	SP	SP+	
Ghazipur	373	Jakhanian (SC)	Triveni Ram	SBSP	NDA	
Ghazipur	374	Saidpur (SC)	Ankit Bharti	SP	SP+	
Ghazipur	375	Ghazipur Sadar	Jai Kishan Sahu	SP	SP+	
Ghazipur	376	Jangipur	Virendra Kumar Yadav	SP	SP+	
Ghazipur	377	Zahoorabad	Om Prakash Rajbhar	SBSP	NDA	Leader (SBSP)
Ghazipur	378	Mohammadabad	Suhaib Ansari	SP	SP+	
Ghazipur	379	Zamania	Omprakash Singh	SP	SP+	
Chandauli	380	Mughalsarai	Ramesh Jaiswal	BJP	NDA	
Chandauli	381	Sakaldiha	Prabhunarayan Yadav	SP	SP+	
Chandauli	382	Saiyadraja	Sushil Singh	BJP	NDA	
Chandauli	383	Chakia (SC)	Kailash Kharwar	BJP	NDA	
Varanasi	384	Pindra	Avadhesh Singh	BJP	NDA	
Varanasi	385	Ajagara (SC)	Tribhuvan Ram	BJP	NDA	
Varanasi	386	Shivpur	Anil Rajbhar	BJP	NDA	Cabinet Minister
Varanasi	387	Rohaniya	Sunil Patel	AD(S)	NDA	
Varanasi	388	Varanasi North	Ravindra Jaiswal	BJP	NDA	MOS (I/C)
Varanasi	389	Varanasi South	Neelkanth Tiwari	BJP	NDA	
Varanasi	390	Varanasi Cantonment	Saurabh Srivastava	BJP	NDA	
Varanasi	391	Sevapuri	Neel Ratan	BJP	NDA	
Bhadohi	392	Bhadohi	Zahid Beg	SP	SP+	
Bhadohi	393	Gyanpur	Vipul Dubey	NISHAD	NDA	
Bhadohi	394	Aurai (SC)	Dinanath Bhaskar	BJP	NDA	
Mirzapur	395	Chhanbey (SC)	Rahul Prakash Kol	AD(S)	NDA	Died on 2 February 2023
Mirzapur	395	Chhanbey (SC)	Rinki Kol	AD(S)	NDA	Elected in Bypoll
Mirzapur	396	Mirzapur	Ratnakar Mishra	BJP	NDA	
Mirzapur	397	Majhawan	Vinod Kumar Bind	NISHAD	NDA	Elected to the 18th Lok Sabha
Mirzapur	397	Majhawan	Suchismita Maurya	BJP	NDA	
Mirzapur	398	Chunar	Anurag Singh	BJP	NDA	
Mirzapur	399	Marihan	Rama Shankar Singh	BJP	NDA	
Sonbhadra	400	Ghorawal	Anil Kumar Maurya	BJP	NDA	
Sonbhadra	401	Robertsganj	Bhupesh Chaubey	BJP	NDA	
Sonbhadra	402	Obra (ST)	Sanjiv Kumar	BJP	NDA	MOS
Sonbhadra	403	Duddhi (ST)	Ramdular Gaur	BJP	NDA	Disqualified on 15 December 2023
Sonbhadra	403	Duddhi (ST)	Vijay Singh	SP	SP+	Elected in Bypoll; Died on 8 January 2026
Sonbhadra	403	Duddhi (ST)	Vacant			

== See also ==
- Uttar Pradesh Legislative Assembly
- 2022 Uttar Pradesh Legislative Assembly election
- 17th Uttar Pradesh Assembly
