= Madhuban Assembly constituency =

Madhuban Assembly constituency may refer to

- Madhuban, Bihar Assembly constituency
- Madhuban, Uttar Pradesh Assembly constituency
