= Rekha Verma =

Rekha Verma is the name of:

- Rekha Verma (born 1961), an Indian politician for the Samajwadi Party
- Rekha Verma (born 1973), an Indian politician for the Bharatiya Janata Party
