= Virendra Singh Lodhi =

Indian politician

Member of Uttar Pradesh Legislative Assembly
- Incumbent
- Assumed office March 2017
- Preceded by: Amit Gaurav
- Constituency: Marhara

Personal details
- Born: 13 July 1970 (age 56) Etah, Uttar Pradesh
- Party: Bharatiya Janata Party
- Spouse: Madhubala
- Parent: Virendra Singh Lodhi (father)
- Education: Bachelor of Arts; Dr. Bhimrao Ambedkar University
- Profession: Politician

Virendra Singh Lodhi is an Indian politician, farmer, and a member of the 18th Uttar Pradesh Assembly from the Marhara Assembly constituency. He is a member of the Bhartiya Janta Party.

== Early life ==
Virendra Singh Lodhi was born on 13 July 1970 in Etah, Uttar Pradesh, to a Hindu Lodhi family of Vrindavan Singh. He married Madhubala on 12 February 2000.

== Education ==
Virendra Singh Lodhi completed his education with a Bachelor of Arts from JLN College, Etah, affiliated with Dr. Bhimrao Ambedkar University.

== Posts held ==
#	From	To	Position	Comments
01	2017	Incumbent	Member, Uttar Pradesh Legislative Assembly	
