= Hariom Verma =

Indian politician

Member of Uttar Pradesh Legislative Assembly
- Incumbent
- Assumed office 2022
- Preceded by: Devendra Pratap
- Constituency: Amanpur

Personal details
- Born: 1 January 1983 (age 42); Munir Nagar, Uttar Pradesh
- Political party: Bharatiya Janata Party
- Spouse: Sadhana Verma (m. 2001)
- Children: 2 sons, 2 daughters
- Parent: Ramchandra Verma (father)
- Occupation: Politician

Hariom Verma (popularly known as Hariom) is an Indian politician who is serving as Member of 18th Uttar Pradesh Assembly from Amanpur Assembly constituency. In the 2022 Uttar Pradesh Legislative Assembly election, he got 96,377 or 50.4% votes and he was elected two times as Jila panchayat in Sadasy dist. Kasganj.

== Personal life ==
His age is 37 years and his profession is agriculture land and jigsaw machine work.
