= Mohan Assembly constituency =

Constituency of the Uttar Pradesh legislative assembly in India

Mohan
- Constituency No. 164 for the Uttar Pradesh Legislative Assembly

Constituency details
- Country: India
- Region: North India
- State: Uttar Pradesh
- District: Unnao
- Total electors: 3,42,858
- Reservation: SC

Member of Legislative Assembly
- 18th Uttar Pradesh Legislative Assembly
- Incumbent Brijesh Kumar Rawat
- Party: BJP
- Elected year: 2017

Mohan is a constituency of the Uttar Pradesh Legislative Assembly covering the city of Mohan in the Unnao district of Uttar Pradesh, India.

Mohan (मोहान), sometimes spelt Mohana or erroneously Mahon in some government records and pronounced मोहान (उन्नाव जिला), is one of six assembly constituencies in the Unnao Lok Sabha seat. Since 2008, this assembly constituency is numbered 164 amongst 403 constituencies.

Currently this seat belongs to Bharatiya Janata Party candidate Brijesh Kumar Rawat who won in last Assembly election of 2017 Uttar Pradesh Legislative Elections defeating Bahujan Samaj Party candidate Radhe Lal Rawat by a margin of 54,095 votes.

== Members of the Legislative Assembly ==
- 1957 : Seat did not exist
- 1962 : Sukh Lal (Jana Sangh)
- 1977 : Bhagauti Singh (JNP)
- 1980 : Chandra Shekhar Trivedi (INC-I)
- 1985 : Bhagoti Singh (IND)
- 1991 : Gomti Prasad (BJP)
- 1993 : Rajendra Prasad (SP)
- 1996 : Gomti Yadav (BJP)
- 2017 : Brijesh Kumar Rawat (BJP)

== Election results ==
=== 2027 ===
2027 Uttar Pradesh Legislative Assembly election: Mohan
Party	Candidate	Votes	%	±%
INDIA				
NDA				
BSP				
NOTA	None of the above			
Majority				
Turnout				
gain from		Swing		

=== 2022 ===
2022 Uttar Pradesh Legislative Assembly Election: Mohan
Party	Candidate	Votes	%	±%
BJP	Brajesh Kumar Rawat	113,291	53.45	+1.67
SP	Dr. Anchal Verma	70,112	33.08	
BSP	Sewak Lal Rawat	20,806	9.82	−15.26
INC	Madhu Verma	2,744	1.29	−15.73
NOTA	None of the above	1,579	0.74	−0.38
Majority		43,179	20.37	−6.33
Turnout		211,963	61.82	−0.89
BJP hold		Swing		

=== 2017 ===
2017 Uttar Pradesh Legislative Assembly Election: Mohan
Party	Candidate	Votes	%	±%
BJP	Brijesh Kumar Rawat	104,884	51.78	
BSP	Radhe Lal Rawat	50,789	25.08	
INC	Bhagwan Das Katheria	34,465	17.02	
BMP	Sunil Kumar	3,316	1.64	
Independent	Vinay Chaudhary	3,125	1.54	
NOTA	None of the above	2,235	1.12	
Majority		54,095	26.7	
Turnout		202,538	62.71	

=== 1996 ===
- Gomti Yadav (BJP) : 76,097 votes
- Rajendra Prasad Yadav (SP) : 60,432

=== 1993 ===
- Rajendra Prasad (SP) : 66,540 votes
- Rajnath Singh (BJP) : 58,572

=== 1977 ===
- Bhagauti Singh (JNP) : 32,824 votes
- Chandra Shekhar Trivedi (INC) : 21,350

=== 1962 ===
- Sukh Lal (BJS) : 14,738 votes
- Basat Lal (INC) : 13,612

== See also ==
- List of constituencies of Uttar Pradesh Legislative Assembly
