= Koraon Assembly constituency =

Constituency of the Uttar Pradesh legislative assembly in India

Coordinates: 25.00°N 82.07°E

Koraon
- Constituency No. 265 for the Uttar Pradesh Legislative Assembly

Constituency details
- Country: India
- Region: North India
- State: Uttar Pradesh
- District: Prayagraj
- Total electors: 336,110 (2019)
- Reservation: SC

Member of Legislative Assembly
- 18th Uttar Pradesh Legislative Assembly
- Incumbent Rajmani Kol
- Party: Bharatiya Janta Party
- Elected year: 2022

Koraon is a constituency of the Uttar Pradesh Legislative Assembly covering the city of Koraon in the Prayagraj district of Uttar Pradesh, India.

Koraon is one of five assembly constituencies in the Prayagraj Lok Sabha constituency. Since 2008, this assembly constituency is numbered 265 amongst 403 constituencies.

== Members of the Legislative Assembly ==
Election	Name	Party
2007	Ranavendra Pratap Singh	Bharatiya Janata Party
2012	Rajbali Jaisal	Bahujan Samaj Party
2017	Rajmani Kol	Bharatiya Janata Party
2022	Rajmani Kol	Bharatiya Janata Party

== Election results ==
=== 2027 ===
2027 Uttar Pradesh Legislative Assembly election: Koraon
Party	Candidate	Votes	%	±%
INDIA				
NDA				
BSP				
NOTA	None of the above			
Majority				
Turnout				
gain from		Swing		

=== 2022 ===
2022 Uttar Pradesh Legislative Assembly election: Koraon
Party	Candidate	Votes	%	±%
BJP	Rajmani Kol	84,587	40.74	−10.44
SP	Ramdev Nidar	60,100	28.95	+26.93
BSP	Rajbali Jaisal	26,383	12.71	−0.57
INC	Ramkripal	21,462	10.34	−13.47
SS	Arati Devi	3,090	1.49	
NOTA	None of the above	2,628	1.27	−0.39
Majority		24,487	11.79	−15.58
Turnout		207,611	59.04	−0.54
BJP hold		Swing		

=== 2017 ===
Bharatiya Janta Party candidate Rajmani won in 2017 Uttar Pradesh Legislative Elections defeating Indian National Congress candidate Ram Kripal by a margin of 53,696 votes.

2017 Uttar Pradesh Legislative Assembly Election: Korao
Party	Candidate	Votes	%	±%
BJP	Rajmani Kol	100,427	51.18	
INC	Ram Kripal	46,731	23.81	
BSP	Raj Bali Jaisal	26,056	13.28	
Independent	Dharm Raj Dhangar	5,134	2.62	
SP	Ram Dev Nidar	3,958	2.02	
BMP	Shiv Janak	2,214	1.13	
CPI(M)	Chiraunji Lal Kol	1,861	0.95	
NOTA	None of the above	3,208	1.66	
Majority		53,696	27.37	
Turnout		196,227	59.58	
