= Marhara Assembly constituency =

Constituency of the Uttar Pradesh legislative assembly in India

Marhara
- Constituency No. 105 for the Uttar Pradesh Legislative Assembly

Constituency details
- Country: India
- Region: North India
- State: Uttar Pradesh
- District: Etah
- Total electors: 325369 (2022)
- Reservation: None

Member of Legislative Assembly
- 18th Uttar Pradesh Legislative Assembly
- Incumbent Virendra Singh Lodhi
- Party: Bharatiya Janta Party
- Elected year: 2022

Marhara Assembly constituency is one of the 403 constituencies of the Uttar Pradesh Legislative Assembly, India. It is a part of the Etah district and one of the five assembly constituencies in the Etah Lok Sabha constituency. First election in this assembly constituency was held in 2012 after the "Delimitation of Parliamentary and Assembly Constituencies Order, 2008" was passed and the constituency was formed in 2008. The constituency is assigned identification number 105. This constituency was also in existence from 1962 to 1967.

== Wards / Areas ==
Extent of Marhara Assembly constituency is KCs Jirasami, Marhara, Pilua, PCs Dholeshwar, Horchi, Manoura, Magarouli, Nidhouli Kalan, Margaya, Raphat Nagar Senthara, Gahetoo of Nidholikalan KC & Marhara MB of Etah Tehsil.

== Members of the Legislative Assembly ==
#	Term	Name	Party	From	To	Days	Comments	Ref
01	03rd Vidhan Sabha	Raghubir Singh	Praja Socialist Party	Mar-1962	Mar-1967	1,828	-	
02	16th Vidhan Sabha	Amit Gaurav	Samajwadi Party	Mar-2012	Mar-2017	-	-	
03	17 Vidhan Sabha	Virendra Singh Lodhi	Bhartiya Janata Party	March 2017	Mar-2022	-	-	
04	18 Vidhan Sabha	Virendra Singh Lodhi	Bhartiya Janata Party	March 2022	Incumbent	-	-	

== Election results ==
=== 2027 ===
2027 Uttar Pradesh Legislative Assembly election: Marhara
Party	Candidate	Votes	%	±%
INDIA				
NDA				
BSP				
NOTA	None of the above			
Majority				
Turnout				
gain from		Swing		

=== 2022 ===
2022 Uttar Pradesh Legislative Assembly election: Marhara
Party	Candidate	Votes	%	±%
BJP	Virendra Singh Lodhi	101,387	49.01	+0.66
SP	Amit Gaurav	83,778	40.5	+9.63
BSP	Yogesh Kumar	16,900	8.17	−8.54
NOTA	None of the above	847	0.41	−0.3
Majority		17,609	8.51	−8.97
Turnout		206,870	66.76	+2.16
BJP hold		Swing		

=== 2017 ===
2017 Uttar Pradesh Legislative Assembly Election: Marhara
Party	Candidate	Votes	%	±%
BJP	Virendra Singh Lodhi	92,507	48.35	
SP	Amit Gaurav	59,075	30.87	
BSP	Shalabh Maheshwari	31,966	16.71	
Jan Adhikar Manch	Kailash Lodhi	2,168	1.13	
NOTA	None of the above	1,351	0.71	
Majority		33,432	17.48	
Turnout		191,339	64.6	

=== 2012 ===
16th Vidhan Sabha: 2012 Elections

2012 General Elections: Marhara
Party	Candidate	Votes	%	±%
SP	Amit Gaurav	61,827	36.16	−
Independent	Virendra Singh Lodhi	39,571	23.14	−
BSP	Nannu Singh	30,340	17.74	−
	Remainder 13 candidates	39,243	22.94	−
Majority		22,256	13.02	−
Turnout		170,981	63.79	−
SP hold		Swing		

== See also ==
- Etah district
- Etah Lok Sabha constituency
- Sixteenth Legislative Assembly of Uttar Pradesh
- Uttar Pradesh Legislative Assembly
- Vidhan Bhawan
