= Mahasi Assembly constituency =

Constituency of the Uttar Pradesh legislative assembly in India

Coordinates: 27.64°N 81.37°E

Mahasi
- Constituency No. 285 for the Uttar Pradesh Legislative Assembly

Constituency details
- Country: India
- Region: North India
- State: Uttar Pradesh
- District: Bahraich
- Total electors: 3,39,363
- Reservation: None

Member of Legislative Assembly
- 18th Uttar Pradesh Legislative Assembly
- Incumbent Sureshwar Singh
- Party: Bharatiya Janata Party
- Elected year: 2022

Mahasi is a constituency of the Uttar Pradesh Legislative Assembly covering the city of Mahasi and other parts of Mahasi tehsil in Bahraich district of Uttar Pradesh, India. Mahasi is one of five assembly constituencies in the Bahraich Lok Sabha constituency. Since 2008, this assembly constituency is numbered 285 among 403 constituencies. As of 2022 its representative is Sureshwar Singh of the Bharatiya Janata Party.

== Members of the Legislative Assembly ==
| Election | Name | Party |
|---|---|---|
| 2012 | Krishna Kumar Ojha | Bahujan Samaj Party |
| 2017 | Sureshwar Singh | Bharatiya Janata Party |
| 2022 | Sureshwar Singh | Bharatiya Janata Party |

== Election results ==
=== 2027 ===
2027 Uttar Pradesh Legislative Assembly election: Mahasi
| Party | Candidate | Votes | % | ±% |
|---|---|---|---|---|
| INDIA | | | | |
| NDA | | | | |
| BSP | | | | |
| NOTA | None of the above | | | |
| Majority | | | | |
| Turnout | | | | |
| gain from | | Swing | | |

=== 2022 ===
2022 Uttar Pradesh Legislative Assembly election: Mahasi
| Party | Candidate | Votes | % | ±% |
|---|---|---|---|---|
| BJP | Sureshwar Singh | 117,883 | 54.58 | +1.49 |
| SP | Krishna Kumar Ojha | 75,199 | 34.82 | |
| BSP | Dinesh Kumar Shukla | 10,651 | 4.93 | −12.66 |
| INC | Dr. Rajesh Tiwari | 4,830 | 2.24 | −20.93 |
| Sarvajan Hitay Party | Dileep Kumar | 3,282 | 1.52 | |
| NOTA | None of the above | 2,264 | 1.05 | −0.6 |
| Majority | | 42,684 | 19.76 | −10.16 |
| Turnout | | 215,978 | 63.64 | +2.57 |
| BJP hold | | Swing | | |

=== 2017 ===
Bharatiya Janta Party candidate Sureshwar Singh won in 2017 Uttar Pradesh Legislative Elections defeating Indian National Congress candidate Ali Akbar by a margin of 58,969 votes.

2017 Uttar Pradesh Legislative Assembly Election: Mahas
| Party | Candidate | Votes | % | ±% |
|---|---|---|---|---|
| BJP | Sureshwar Singh | 104,654 | 53.09 | |
| INC | Ali Akbar | 45,685 | 23.17 | |
| BSP | Krishna Kumar Ojha | 34,685 | 17.59 | |
| Sabka Dal United | Parmod Kumar | 2,757 | 1.4 | |
| Independent | Piyush | 1,903 | 0.97 | |
| NOTA | None of the above | 3,201 | 1.65 | |
| Majority | | 58,969 | 29.92 | |
| Turnout | | 197,137 | 61.07 | |
