= Sureshwar Singh =

Indian politician (born 1962)

Member of Uttar Pradesh Legislative Assembly
- Incumbent
- Assumed office 2017
- Preceded by: Krishna Kumar Ojha
- Constituency: Mahasi
- In office 2007–2012
- Preceded by: Dilip Kumar Verma
- Succeeded by: Krishna Kumar Ojha
- Constituency: Mahasi

Personal details
- Born: 19 June 1962 (age 64) Bahraich, Uttar Pradesh
- Party: Bharatiya Janata Party
- Parents: Sukhad Raj Singh ‘ex-mla’ (father); Neelam Singh ‘ex-mla’ (mother)
- Profession: Politician

Sureshwar Singh is an Indian politician, farmer and a member of the 18th Uttar Pradesh Assembly from the Mahasi Assembly constituency of the Bahraich district. He is a member of the Bharatiya Janata Party.

== Early life ==
Sureshwar Singh was born on 19 June 1962 in Bahraich, Uttar Pradesh, to a Hindu family of Sukhad Raj Singh. He married Ganga Singh in 1983, and they have four children.

== Education ==
Sureshwar Singh completed his schooling at Gandhi Inter College, affiliated with the Uttar Pradesh State Board of High School and Intermediate Education, Prayagraj, in 1981.

== Posts held ==
#	From	To	Position	Ref
01	March 2007	March 2012	Member, 15th Uttar Pradesh Assembly	
02	March 2017	March 2022	Member, 17th Uttar Pradesh Assembly	
03	March 2022	Incumbent	Member, 18th Uttar Pradesh Assembly	

== See also ==
- 18th Uttar Pradesh Assembly
- Mahasi Assembly constituency
- Uttar Pradesh Legislative Assembly
