= Barabanki (disambiguation) =

Barabanki or Bara Banki or Barabunki (historically also spelled as Barabunkee, Bara Bunki, Barabunky, Bara Bunky), may refer to a number of places in Uttar Pradesh, India:

- Barabanki district, a district in Awadh region of Uttar Pradesh state
- Barabanki, Uttar Pradesh, a city which is district headquarters of Brabanki district
- Barabanki village, a revenue village in Nawabganj, Barabanki tehsil, is also a constituent of Barabanki city
- Barabanki (Lok Sabha constituency), Lok Sabha (parliamentary) constituencies in Uttar Pradesh state
- Barabanki (Vidhan Sabha constituency), a constituency of Uttar Pradesh Vidhan Sabha
- Barabanki Junction railway station, intercity rail station and a commuter rail hub in the Barabanki city
