= Sandi Assembly constituency =

Constituency of the Uttar Pradesh legislative assembly in India

Coordinates: 27.29°N 79.96°E

Sandi
- Constituency No. 158 for the Uttar Pradesh Legislative Assembly

Constituency details
- Country: India
- Region: North India
- State: Uttar Pradesh
- District: Hardoi
- Lok Sabha constituency: Hardoi
- Established: 2012
- Total electors: 3,32,011
- Reservation: SC

Member of Legislative Assembly
- 18th Uttar Pradesh Legislative Assembly
- Incumbent Prabhash Kumar
- Party: BJP
- Elected year: 2022

Sandi is a constituency of the Uttar Pradesh Legislative Assembly covering the city of Sandi, and other parts of Bilgram and Hardoi tehsils, both in Hardoi district of Uttar Pradesh, India. It is one of five assembly constituencies in the Hardoi Lok Sabha constituency. Since 2008, this assembly constituency is numbered 158 amongst 403 constituencies. As of 2022, it is represented by Bharatiya Janata Party candidate Prabhash Kumar who won in 2022.

== Members of the Legislative Assembly ==
| Election | Name | Party |
|---|---|---|
| 2012 | Rajeshwari Devi | Samajwadi Party |
| 2017 | Prabhash Kumar | Bharatiya Janata Party |
| 2022 | Prabhash Kumar | Bharatiya Janata Party |

=== 2022 ===
2022 Uttar Pradesh Legislative Assembly election: Sandi
| Party | Candidate | Votes | % | ±% |
|---|---|---|---|---|
| BJP | Prabhash Kumar | 81,519 | 41.7 | |
| SP | Usha Verma | 72,286 | 36.97 | |
| BSP | Kamal Verma | 30,576 | 15.64 | |
| NOTA | None of the above | 1,689 | 0.86 | |
| Majority | | 9,233 | | |
| Turnout | | 195,511 | 58.89 | |
| BJP hold | | Swing | | |

== Results ==
=== 2027 ===
2027 Uttar Pradesh Legislative Assembly election: Sandi
| Party | Candidate | Votes | % | ±% |
|---|---|---|---|---|
| INDIA | | | | |
| NDA | | | | |
| BSP | | | | |
| NOTA | None of the above | | | |
| Majority | | | | |
| Turnout | | | | |
| gain from | | Swing | | |

=== 2022 ===
2022 Uttar Pradesh Legislative Assembly Election: Sandi
| Party | Candidate | Votes | % | ±% |
|---|---|---|---|---|
| BJP | Prabhash Kumar | 81,519 | 41.7 | 2.91 |
| SP | Usha Verma | 72,286 | 36.97 | |
| BSP | Kamal Verma | 30,576 | 15.64 | −11.67 |
| INC | Akanksha Verma | 3,055 | 1.56 | −26.34 |
| NOTA | None of the Above | 1689 | 0.86 | −0.35 |
| Majority | | 9233 | 4.73 | −6.16 |
| Turnout | | 195511 | 58.89 | 0.37 |

=== 2017 ===
2017 Uttar Pradesh Legislative Assembly Election: Sandi
| Party | Candidate | Votes | % | ±% |
|---|---|---|---|---|
| BJP | Prabhash Kumar | 72,044 | 38.79 | |
| INC | Omendra Kumar Verma | 51,819 | 27.9 | |
| BSP | Virendra Kumar | 50,725 | 27.31 | |
| Independent | Urmila Devi | 1,456 | 0.78 | |
| Independent | Santosh | 1,227 | 0.66 | |
| CPI(M) | Santosh Verma | 1139 | 0.61 | |
| Independent | Meena Devi | 1111 | 0.6 | |
| Independent | Prem Chand | 905 | 0.49 | |
| Independent | Anand Kumar | 737 | 0.4 | |
| Bharatiya Subhash Sena | Virendra Kumar | 556 | 0.3 | |
| BMP | Vijay Bahadur | 474 | 0.26 | |
| Independent | Upendra Kumar | 462 | 0.25 | |
| Unknown | Krishna Kumar | 426 | 0.23 | |
| Unknown | Ram Lakhan Gautam | 409 | 0.22 | |
| NOTA | None of the Above | 2222 | 1.21 | |
| Majority | | 20225 | 10.89 | |
| Turnout | | 185712 | 58.52 | |

== See also ==
- Hardoi district
- List of constituencies of the Uttar Pradesh Legislative Assembly
