= Balamau Assembly constituency =

Constituency of the Uttar Pradesh legislative assembly in India

Coordinates: 27.14°N 80.29°E

Balamau
- Constituency No. 160 for the Uttar Pradesh Legislative Assembly

Constituency details
- Country: India
- Region: North India
- State: Uttar Pradesh
- District: Hardoi
- Total electors: 3,47,218
- Reservation: SC

Member of Legislative Assembly
- 18th Uttar Pradesh Legislative Assembly
- Incumbent Ram Pal Verma
- Party: Bharatiya Janata Party
- Elected year: 2022
- Preceded by: Anil Verma

Balamau is a constituency of the Uttar Pradesh Legislative Assembly covering the city of Balamau in the Hardoi district of Uttar Pradesh, India. Balamau is one of five assembly constituencies in the Misrikh Lok Sabha constituency. Since 2008, this assembly constituency is numbered 160 amongst 403 constituencies.

== Members of the Legislative Assembly ==
Election	Name	Party
2012	Anil Verma	Samajwadi Party
2017	Ram Pal Verma	Bharatiya Janata Party
2022	Ram Pal Verma	Bharatiya Janata Party

== Election results ==
=== 2027 ===
2027 Uttar Pradesh Legislative Assembly election: Balamau
Party	Candidate	Votes	%	±%
INDIA				
NDA				
BSP				
NOTA	None of the above			
Majority				
Turnout				
gain from		Swing		

=== 2022 ===
2022 Uttar Pradesh Legislative Assembly election: Balamau
Party	Candidate	Votes	%	±%
BJP	Ram Pal Verma	81,994	42.84	+2.99
SP	Rambali Verma	55,750	29.13	+5.99
BSP	Tilak Chandra	42,551	22.23	−5.45
INC	Surendra Kumar	4,112	2.15	
NOTA	None of the above	2,047	1.07	−0.01
Majority		26,244	13.71	+1.54
Turnout		191,387	55.12	+1.02
BJP hold		Swing		

=== 2017 ===
Bharatiya Janata Party candidate Ram Pal Verma won in last Assembly election of 2017 Uttar Pradesh Legislative Elections defeating Bahujan Samaj Party candidate Neelu Satyarthi by a margin of 22,888 votes.

2017 Uttar Pradesh Legislative Assembly election: Balamau
Party	Candidate	Votes	%	±%
BJP	Ram Pal Verma	74,917	39.85	
BSP	Neelu Satyarthi	52,029	27.68	
SP	Sushila Saroj	43,507	23.14	
Jan Adhikar Manch	Surendra Kumar	7,734	4.11	
NOTA	None of the above	2,005	1.08	
Majority		22,888	12.17	
Turnout		187,997	54.1	
BJP gain from SP		Swing		
