= Ram Pal Verma =

Indian politician

Member of the Uttar Pradesh Legislative Assembly
- Incumbent
- Assumed office 2017
- Constituency: Balamau

Member of the Uttar Pradesh Legislative Assembly
- In office 1984-1991

Member of the Uttar Pradesh Legislative Assembly
- In office 2004 - 2012

Personal details
- Born: 2 August 1959 (age 66)
- Party: Bhartiya Janta Party
- Other political affiliations: Indian National Congress; Samajwadi Party; Bahujan Samaj Party
- Spouse: Sarojani Verma
- Parent: Anganelal (father)
- Profession: Agriculture

Ram Pal Verma is an Indian politician and member of Bhartiya Janta Party.He is one of the senior leaders of the Bhartiya Janta Party.He is currently serving as a member of the Uttar Pradesh Legislative Assembly from Balamau. He is a nine time MLA.

== Political career ==
Ram Pal Verma was first elected to Uttar Pradesh Legislative Assembly in 1985 as an independent candidate. In 1988, he was re-elected to Uttar Pradesh Legislative Assembly on a Congress party ticket. He again became MLA in 1996.

Verma, on Bahujan Samaj Party ticket won the by-election in 2004. In 2007, he once again was elected to the Uttar Pradesh Legislative Assembly and was inducted as Minister of State with independent charge in the government.

Ram Pal Verma was elected from Balamau constituency in 2017 and 2022 on Bhartiya Janta Party ticket. In 2017, he defeated Neelu Satyarthi of BSP by a margin of 22888 votes.

In 2022, he defeated Rambali Verma by a margin of more than 26 thousand votes. Verma was inducted as a member of the panel of pro tem Speaker of Uttar Pradesh assembly in the presence of chief minister Yogi Adityanath.

== See also ==
- 18th Uttar Pradesh Assembly
- Uttar Pradesh Legislative Assembly
- Balamau Assembly constituency
