= Ram Feran Pandey =

Indian politician

Member of the Uttar Pradesh Legislative Assembly
- Incumbent
- Assumed office March 2017
- Preceded by: Muhammad Ramjan
- Constituency: Shravasti

Personal details
- Born: 1 December 1965 (age 60)
- Party: Bharatiya Janata Party
- Children: 5
- Occupation: Agriculture, Politician

Ram Feran Pandey (born 1 December 1965) is an Indian Politician from Bharatiya Janata Party and a Member of the Uttar Pradesh Legislative Assembly. He is a member of 18th Uttar Pradesh Assembly and was also Seventeenth Legislative Assembly of Uttar Pradesh member from Shravasti Vidhansabha.

== Positions held ==
#	From	To	Position
01	2017	2022	Member, 17th Legislative Assembly
02	2022	Incumbent	Member, 18th Legislative Assembly
