= Brijesh Kumar Rawat =

Member of the Uttar Pradesh Legislative Assembly

Member of Uttar Pradesh Legislative Assembly
- Incumbent
- Assumed office March 2017
- Constituency: Mohan

Personal details
- Born: 1 July 1966 (age 60) Unnao, Uttar Pradesh
- Party: Bharatiya Janata Party
- Spouse: Nekrani Devi
- Children: 3
- Parent: Lala Ram (father)
- Profession: Politician

Brijesh Kumar Rawat (born 1 July 1966) also known as Brijesh Kumar, is an Indian politician, teacher, and a member of the 18th Uttar Pradesh Assembly from the Mohan Assembly constituency of Unnao district. He is a member of the Bharatiya Janata Party.

== Early life ==
Brijesh Kumar Rawat was born on 1 July 1966 in Unnao, Uttar Pradesh, to a Hindu family of Munna Lala Ram. He married Nekrani Devi on 20 May 1975, and they had three children.

== Posts held ==
#	From	To	Position	Comments
01	2022	Incumbent	Member, 18th Uttar Pradesh Assembly	
