= Dharmraj Singh Yadav =

Indian politician

- धर्मराज सिंह यादव
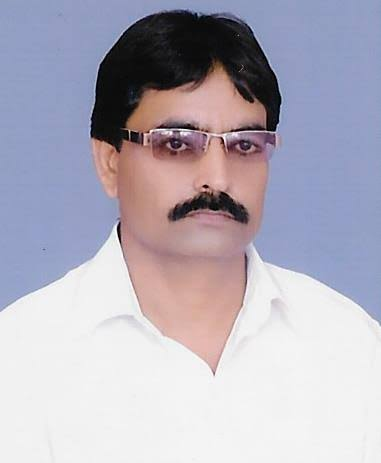

Member of 16th Uttar Pradesh Legislative Assembly
- In office 2012–2017
- Preceded by: Sangram Singh
- Constituency: Barabanki

Member of 17th Uttar Pradesh Legislative Assembly
- In office 2017–2022
- Preceded by: Surendra Singh
- Constituency: Barabanki

Member of 18th Uttar Pradesh Legislative Assembly
- Incumbent
- Assumed office 2022
- Preceded by: Ramkumari Maurya
- Constituency: Barabanki

Personal details
- Party: Samajwadi Party
- Occupation: Politician

Suresh Yadav better known as Dharmraj Singh Yadav is an Indian politician serving as a member of the 18th Uttar Pradesh Legislative Assembly. He is a member of the Samajwadi Party and represents the Barabanki Assembly constituency in Barabanki district.

He previously served as a member of the 16th and 17th Uttar Pradesh Legislative Assembly, representing the Barabanki Assembly constituency.

== Career ==
Following the 2022 Uttar Pradesh Legislative Assembly election, he was re-elected as an MLA from the Barabanki Assembly constituency, defeating Ramkumari Maurya, the candidate from the Bhartiya Janta Party (BJP), by a margin of 35,050 votes.

== Early life ==
Yadav was born on 17 June 1963. He has obtained a law degree from Lucknow University.
