= Amit Gaurav =

Indian politician

Amit Gaurav Yadav अमित गौरव यादव

MLA, 16th Legislative Assembly
- In office March 2012 – May 2017
- Preceded by: None
- Succeeded by: Virendra Lodhi
- Constituency: Marhara

Etah

Personal details
- Born: Teetu; 20 July 1977 (age 49) Ramnagar, Etah district
- Citizenship: Indian
- Party: Samajwadi Party
- Spouse: Reeta Yadav
- Children: 3
- Education: Dr. Jakir Hussain Islamiya Inter College
- Profession: Farmer and politician

Amit Gaurav Yadav (Hindi: अमित गौरव यादव) is an Indian politician and a member of the Sixteenth Legislative Assembly of Uttar Pradesh in India. He represents the Marhara constituency of Uttar Pradesh and is a member of the Samajwadi Party political party.

== Early life and education ==
Amit Gaurav was born in Village Ramnagar district Etah. His father was also a MLA, and his brother Shashank Yadav Sheetu is Member of Jila Panchayat Etah. He attended the Dr. Jakir Hussain Islamiya Inter College and is educated till twelfth grade.

== Political career ==
Amit Gaurav has been a MLA for one term. He represented the Marhara constituency and is a member of the Samajwadi Party political party. He is very close to Vikas Yadav.

== Posts held ==
#	From	To	Position	Comments
01	2012		Member, 16th Legislative Assembly	

== See also ==
- Marhara (Assembly constituency)
- Sixteenth Legislative Assembly of Uttar Pradesh
- Uttar Pradesh Legislative Assembly
