= Prabhash Kumar =

Member of the Uttar Pradesh Legislative Assembly

Member of Uttar Pradesh Legislative Assembly
- Incumbent
- Assumed office March 2022
- Constituency: Sandi

Personal details
- Born: 30 June 1975 (age 51) Hardoi, Uttar Pradesh
- Party: Bharatiya Janata Party
- Spouse: Nirama Devi
- Parent: Kuber Lal (father)
- Occupation: Farmer
- Profession: Politician

Prabhash Kumar is an Indian politician, farmer, and a member of the 18th Uttar Pradesh Assembly from the Sandi Assembly constituency of Hardoi. He is a member of the Bharatiya Janata Party.

== Early life ==
Prabhash Kumar was born on 30 June 1975 in Hardoi, Uttar Pradesh, to a Hindu family of Kuber Lal. He married Nirama Devi on 8 May 1998.

== Posts held ==
#	From	To	Position	Comments
01	2022	Incumbent	Member, 18th Uttar Pradesh Assembly	

== See also ==
- 18th Uttar Pradesh Assembly
- Sandi Assembly constituency
- Uttar Pradesh Legislative Assembly
