= Anil Kumar Verma =

Indian politician from Uttar Pradesh

Anil Kumar Verma Member of the Uttar Pradesh legislative assembly
- Education: Graduate
- Occupation: Politician
- Political party: Samajwadi Party

Anil Kumar Verma is an Indian politician of the Samajwadi Party. He is a member of the 18th Uttar Pradesh Assembly, representing the Laharpur Assembly constituency.
