= Ram Bilash Chauhan =

Indian politician

Member of the Uttar Pradesh Legislative Assembly
- Incumbent
- Assumed office March 2022
- Constituency: Madhuban

Personal details
- Born: Azamgarh, India
- Political party: Bhartiya Janta Party
- Parents: Phagoo Chauhan (father); Muhari Devi (mother)
- Education: Bachelor of Laws
- Alma mater: Veer Bahadur Singh Purvanchal University
- Occupation: Politician

Ram Bilash Chauhan is an Indian politician and a member of the 18th Uttar Pradesh Assembly from the Madhuban Assembly constituency. He is a member of Bhartiya Janta Party.

== Early life ==
Ram Bilash Chauhan was born in Azamgarh, Uttar Pradesh, to Phagoo Chauhan and Muhari Devi.

== Education ==
Chauhan completed his Bachelor of Laws in 1996 from Veer Bahadur Singh Purvanchal University.

== Posts held ==
#	From	To	Position	Comments
01	2022	Incumbent	Member, 18th Uttar Pradesh Assembly	
