= Shravasti Assembly constituency =

Constituency of the Uttar Pradesh legislative assembly in India

Coordinates: 27.51°N 82.03°E

Shravasti
- Constituency No. 290 for the Uttar Pradesh Legislative Assembly

Constituency details
- Country: India
- Region: North India
- State: Uttar Pradesh
- District: Shravasti
- Total electors: 4,16,147
- Reservation: None

Member of Legislative Assembly
- 18th Uttar Pradesh Legislative Assembly
- Incumbent Ram Feran Pandey
- Party: BJP
- Elected year: 2022
- Preceded by: Muhammad Ramjan

Shravasti is a constituency of the Uttar Pradesh Legislative Assembly covering the city of Bhinga in the Shravasti district of Uttar Pradesh, India.

Shravasti is one of five assembly constituencies in the Shravasti Lok Sabha constituency. Since 2008, this assembly constituency is numbered 290 amongst 403 constituencies.

== Members of the Legislative Assembly ==
Year	Member	Party
Till 2012 : Constituency did not exist
2012	Muhammad Ramjan	Samajwadi Party
2017	Ram Feran Pandey	Bharatiya Janata Party
2022	Ram Feran Pandey	Bharatiya Janata Party

== Election results ==
=== 2027 ===
2027 Uttar Pradesh Legislative Assembly election: Shravasti
Party	Candidate	Votes	%	±%
INDIA				
NDA				
BSP				
NOTA	None of the above			
Majority				
Turnout				
gain from		Swing		

=== 2022 ===
2022 Uttar Pradesh Legislative Assembly election: Shravasti
Party	Candidate	Votes	%	±%
BJP	Ram Feran Pandey	98,640	38.98	▲6.12
SP	Mohammad Aslam	97,183	38.4	▲5.72
BSP	Neetu Mishra	41,026	16.21	▼5.72
INC	Muhammad Ramjan	4,655	1.84	
Peace Party (India)	Ahtishamul Haque Khan	3,478	1.37	
NOTA	None of the above	3,198	1.26	▼0.55
Majority		1,457	0.58	▲0.4
Turnout		253,077	60.81	▼2.68
BJP hold		Swing		

=== 2017 ===
Bharatiya Janta Party candidate Ram Feran Pandey won in 2017 Uttar Pradesh Legislative Elections defeating Samajwadi Party candidate Mohammed Ramzan by a margin of 445 votes.

2017 Uttar Pradesh Legislative Assembly Election: Shravast
Party	Candidate	Votes	%	±%
BJP	Ram Feran Pandey	79,437	32.86	
SP	Mohd. Ramzan	78,992	32.68	
BSP	Subhash	53,014	21.93	
RLD	Eng. Vinod Kumar Tripathi	10,856	4.49	
AIMIM	Kalim	2,933	1.21	
Independent	Neetu Mishra	2,352	0.97	
Independent	Mohd Yusus Khan	2,212	0.92	
NOTA	None of the above	4,289	1.81	
Majority		445	0.18	
Turnout		241,733	63.49	
