= Barabanki Assembly constituency =

Constituency of the Uttar Pradesh legislative assembly in India

Coordinates: 26.93°N 81.19°E

Barabanki
- Constituency No. 268 for the Uttar Pradesh Legislative Assembly

Constituency details
- Country: India
- Region: North India
- State: Uttar Pradesh
- District: Barabanki
- Total electors: 3,71,731 registered voters
- Reservation: None

Member of Legislative Assembly
- 18th Uttar Pradesh Legislative Assembly
- Incumbent Dharmraj Singh Yadav
- Party: Samajwadi Party
- Elected year: 2022

Barabanki is a constituency of the Uttar Pradesh Legislative Assembly covering the city of Barabanki in the Barabanki district of Uttar Pradesh, India. Barabanki is one of five assembly constituencies in the Barabanki Lok Sabha constituency. Since 2008, this assembly constituency is numbered 268 amongst 403 constituencies.

According to data with the Election Commission of India, Barabanki Assembly constituency has 3,71,731 registered voters. It comprises 2,00,150 male and 1,71,581 female registered voters.

== Election results ==
=== 2027 ===
2027 Uttar Pradesh Legislative Assembly election: Barabanki
Party	Candidate	Votes	%	±%
INDIA				
NDA				
BSP	Mohammad Mubashshir			
NOTA	None of the above			
Majority				
Turnout				
gain from		Swing		

=== 2022 ===
2022 Uttar Pradesh Legislative Assembly election: Barabanki
Party	Candidate	Votes	%	±%
SP	Dharmraj Singh Yadav	125,500	47.11	▲6.57
BJP	Ramkumari Maurya	90,450	33.95	▲6.59
BSP	Vivek Singh Verma	42,506	15.96	▼12.47
INC	Roohi Arshad	4,560	1.71	
NOTA	None of the above	1,526	0.57	▼0.1
Majority		35,050	13.16	▲1.05
Turnout		266,396	67.93	▲1.28
SP hold				

=== 2017 ===
Samajwadi Party candidate Dharamraj Singh Yadav won in last Assembly election of 2017 Uttar Pradesh Legislative Elections defeating Bahujan Samaj Party candidate Sangram Singh by a margin of 29,704 votes. The voter turnout was 64.25%.

2017 Uttar Pradesh Legislative Assembly Election: Barabank
Party	Candidate	Votes	%	±%
SP	Dharmraj Singh Yadav Urf Suresh Yadav	99,453	40.54	
BSP	Surendra Singh	69,748	28.43	
BJP	Har Govind Singh	67,112	27.36	
NOTA	None of the above	1,622	0.67	
Majority		29,705	12.11	
Turnout		245,295	66.65	

== Sitting and previous MLAs ==
Below is the list of winners and runners-up in the Barabanki assembly elections conducted so far,

Year	A C No.	Constituency Name	Category	Winner	Gender	Party	Votes	Runner up	Gender	Party	Votes
2012	268	Barabanki	GEN	Jaishiv tripathi	M	bjp	82343	Sangram Singh	M	BSP	59573
1957	284	Barabanki	(SC)	Bhagavti Prasad	M	IND	37921	Nasirur Rahman	M	INC	33648
1957	284	Barabanki	(SC)	Nattha Ram	M	IND	35315	Tula Ram Rawat	M	INC	31594

== See also ==
- Barabanki (disambiguation)
