= Rajmani Kol =

Indian politician (born 1961)

Member of Uttar Pradesh Legislative Assembly
- Incumbent
- Assumed office March 2017
- Preceded by: Rajbali Jaisal
- Constituency: Koraon

Personal details
- Born: 2 January 1961 (age 64); Prayagraj, Uttar Pradesh
- Political party: Bharatiya Janata Party
- Parent: Chhakauri Kol (father)
- Education: Master of Arts
- Alma mater: Sampurnanand Sanskrit Vishwavidyalaya
- Profession: Politician

Rajmani Kol, also known as Raj Mani, is an Indian politician and a member of the 18th Uttar Pradesh Assembly from the Koraon Assembly constituency of the Prayagraj district. He is a member of the Bharatiya Janata Party.

== Early life ==
Rajmani Kol was born on 2 January 1961 in Prayagraj, Uttar Pradesh, to a Hindu family of Chhakauri Kol. He married Rajkumari Kol in 1977, and they have four children.

== Education ==
Rajmani Kol completed post-graduation with a Master of Arts at Sampurnanand Sanskrit Vishwavidyalaya, Varanasi, in 2000.

== Posts held ==
#	From	To	Position	Ref
01	March 2017	March 2022	Member, 17th Uttar Pradesh Assembly	
02	March 2022	Incumbent	Member, 18th Uttar Pradesh Assembly	

== See also ==
- 18th Uttar Pradesh Assembly
- Koraon Assembly constituency
- Uttar Pradesh Legislative Assembly
