= Amanpur Assembly constituency =

Constituency of the Uttar Pradesh legislative assembly in India

Amanpur
- Constituency No. 101 for the Uttar Pradesh Legislative Assembly

Constituency details
- Country: India
- Region: North India
- State: Uttar Pradesh
- District: Kasganj
- Total electors: 3,09,681 (2022)
- Reservation: None

Member of Legislative Assembly
- 18th Uttar Pradesh Legislative Assembly
- Incumbent Hariom Verma
- Party: Bharatiya Janata Party
- Elected year: 2022

Amanpur Assembly constituency is one of the 403 constituencies of the Uttar Pradesh Legislative Assembly, India. It is a part of the Etah district and one of the five assembly constituencies in the Etah Lok Sabha constituency. First election in this assembly constituency was held in 2012 after the "Delimitation of Parliamentary and Assembly Constituencies Order, 2008" was passed and the constituency was formed in 2008. The constituency is assigned identification number 101.

== Wards ==
The extent of Amanpur Assembly constituency is KCs Sahawar, Amanpur, Manpur Nagariya, Sahawar NP & Amanpur NP of Kasganj Tehsil; PCs Mohanpur, Nagla Nahar, Amirsa, Mijkhuree Sikahara, Nagla Bheemsain, Akhatau Mangadpur, Pilakhuni, Pithanpur, Dahelee Bujurg, Bakavalee, Tajpur, Chandpurmemada of Sidhapura KC & Mohanpur NP of Patiyali Tehsil.

== Members of the Legislative Assembly ==
Year	Winner	Party	Ref.
2012	Mamtesh Shakya	Bahujan Samaj Party	
2017	Devendra Pratap Singh	Bharatiya Janata Party	
2022	Hariom Verma	Bharatiya Janata Party	

== Election results ==
=== 2027 ===
2027 Uttar Pradesh Legislative Assembly election: Amanpur
Party	Candidate	Votes	%	±%
INDIA				
NDA				
BSP				
NOTA	None of the above			
Majority				
Turnout				
gain from		Swing		

=== 2022 ===
2022 Uttar Pradesh Legislative Assembly election: Amanpur
Party	Candidate	Votes	%	±%
BJP	Hariom Verma	96,377	50.4	+4.04
SP	Satyabhan Singh Shakya	53,048	27.74	+4.13
BSP	Subhash Chandra	35,372	18.5	+0.45
NOTA	None of the above	888	0.46	−0.22
Majority		43,329	22.66	−0.09
Turnout		191,228	61.52	−1.24
BJP hold		Swing		

=== 2017 ===
2017 Uttar Pradesh Legislative Assembly election: Amanpur
Party	Candidate	Votes	%	±%
BJP	Devendra Pratap Singh	85,199	46.36	
SP	Virendra Singh Solanki	43,395	23.61	
BSP	Deva Prakash	33,166	18.05	
MD	Rahul Panday	16,967	9.23	
NOTA	None of the above	1,242	0.68	
Majority		41,804	22.75	
Turnout		183,778	62.76	

=== 2012 ===
16th Vidhan Sabha: 2012 Elections

2012 General Elections: Amanpur
Party	Candidate	Votes	%	±%
BSP	Mamtesh Shakya	37,996	23.82	−
SP	Virendra Singh Solanki	34,340	21.53	−
Independent	Devendra Pratap Singh	30,463	19.1	−
	Remainder 20 candidates	56,705	35.55	−
Majority		3,656	2.29	−
Turnout		159,504	58.45	−
BSP hold		Swing		

== See also ==
- Etah district
- Etah Lok Sabha constituency
- Sixteenth Legislative Assembly of Uttar Pradesh
- Uttar Pradesh Legislative Assembly
- Vidhan Bhawan
