= Pradeep Kumar Chaudhary =

Indian politician

Pradeep Kumar Chaudhary is an Indian politician who is serving as Member of 18th Uttar Pradesh Legislative Assembly from Bulandshahr Assembly constituency. In 2022 Uttar Pradesh Legislative Assembly election, he won with 127,076 votes.
