= Vijay Pal =

Indian politician (born 1971)

Member of Uttar Pradesh Legislative Assembly
- Incumbent
- Assumed office March 2017
- Governor: Anandiben Patel
- Chief Minister: Yogi Adityanath
- Constituency: Hapur

Personal details
- Born: 25 May 1971 (age 55) Kheda Kalan
- Party: Bharatiya Janata Party
- Parent: Harish Chand
- Occupation: Businessman

Vijay Pal (born 25 May 1971) is an Indian politician from the state of Uttar Pradesh. He is a two time member of from Hapur constituency in the Uttar Pradesh Legislative Assembly representing Bharatiya Janata Party.

== Early life ==
Vijay Pal is from Hapur, Hapur district, Uttar Pradesh. He is the son of Harish Chand. He passed Class 10 in 1987 after his schooling at SSV Inter College, Hapur, Ghaziabad.

== Career ==
Vijay Pal first became an MLA winning the 2017 Uttar Pradesh Legislative Assembly election representing Bharatiya Janata Party from Hapur Assembly constituency. He retained his seat in the 2022 Uttar Pradesh Legislative Assembly election. He polled 97,862 votes and defeated his nearest rival, Gajraj Singh of Rashtriya Lok Dal, by a margin of 7,034 votes.

== Posts held ==
#	From	To	Position
1	March 2017	Incumbent	Member of Uttar Pradesh Legislative Assembly
