= Samajwadi Alliance =

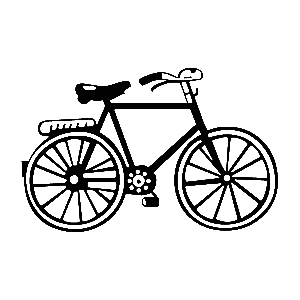
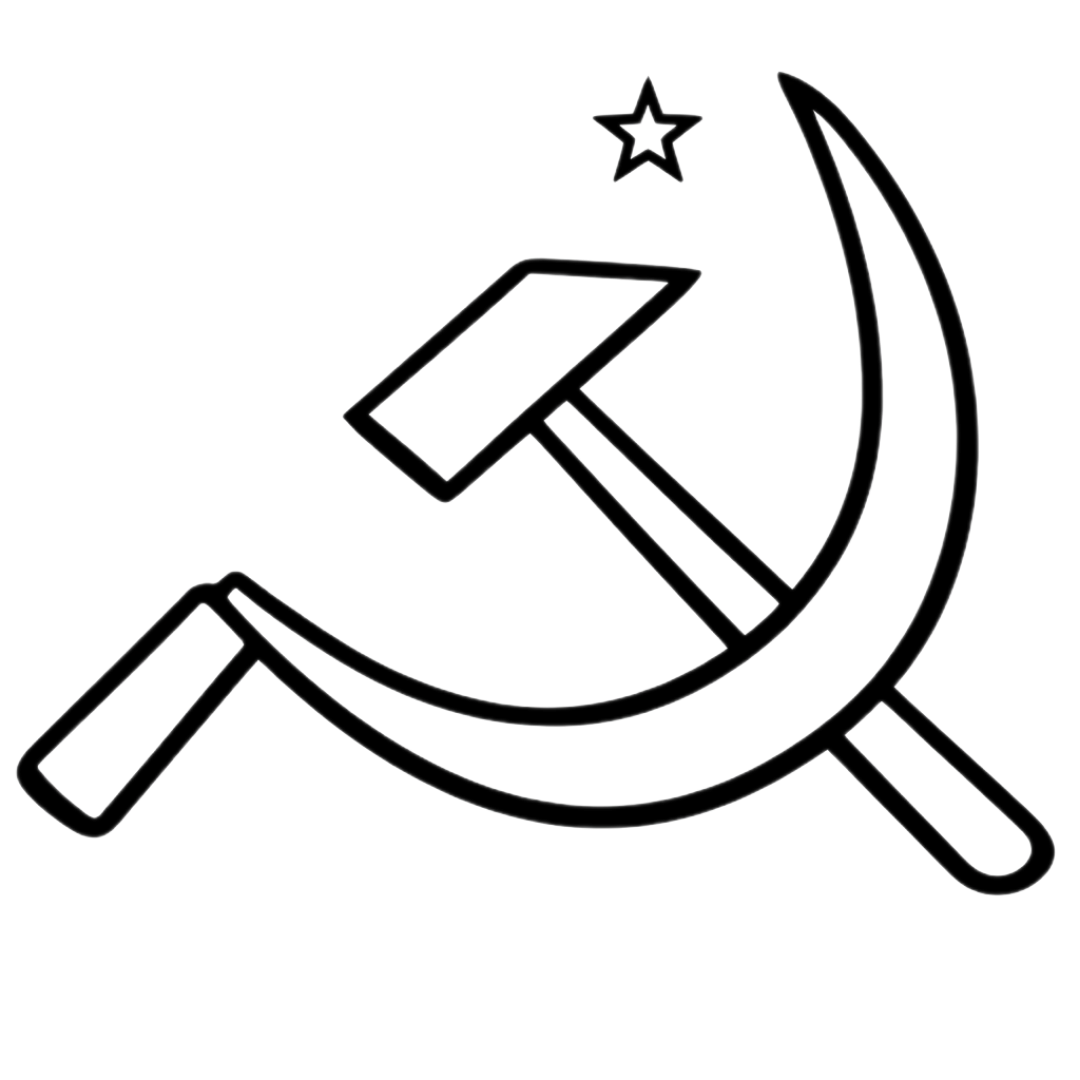
- Samajwadi Alliance; PDA Alliance
- Leader: Akhilesh Yadav
- Founded: 2022
- Ideology: Big tent Majority: Secularism; Socialism; Left wing populism
- Colours: Red
- ECI status: Not required
- Alliance: Indian National Developmental Inclusive Alliance (National)
- Seats in Rajya Sabha: 6 / 31 (SP:5,IND:1") (Uttar Pradesh)
- Seats in Lok Sabha: 43 / 80 (SP:37, INC:6) (Uttar Pradesh)
- Seats in Uttar Pradesh Legislative Assembly: 102 / 403 (SP:100, INC:2)

Samajwadi Alliance (SP+; English: Socialist Alliance), is a major political alliance led by the Samajwadi Party in the Indian state of Uttar Pradesh.

== History ==
=== 2022 Uttar Pradesh Legislative Assembly election ===
RLD was the first to join the alliance. The NCP and RJD too joined the alliance later. Various other smaller parties too joined while SBSP broke away from its alliance to join SP alliance. During the first seat sharing talks, SP agreed to give RLD 36 seats. Initially, RLD demanded 60 seats while SP were willing to give up to 30, later both the parties finalised at 33 with RLD mostly competing in West UP. RLD gave 8 symbol of SP candidates. Aam Aadmi Party and Samajwadi Party began talks for alliance, however they couldn't agree on seat sharing. Pragatisheel Samajwadi Party (Lohiya) joined the alliance later. On 13 January 2022, the alliance announced its initial candidates for the first few phases of the election. SP and SBSP would have a friendly fight on 1 seat while SP and AD(K) would have a friendly fight on 2 seats.

=== 2024 Parliamentary election ===
==== Attempted alliance with the Left ====
CPI(M) General Secretary Sitaram Yechury said that his party will ally with Samajwadi Party in Uttar Pradesh. Akhilesh Yadav said that the alliance will contest all 80 seats in 2024 election and detailed elaboration regarding alliance will be made at the end of 2023.

==== Indian National Developmental Inclusive Alliance ====
However, soon Akhilesh Yadav joined with the Indian National Congress to form the I.N.D.I.A alliance to contest the 2024 polls together. The alliance got landslide victory in Uttar Pradesh winning 43 out of 80 seats.

== Current members ==
Party	Symbol	Flag	MLAs in Uttar Pradesh Assembly	MLCs in Uttar Pradesh Council	MPs in Lok Sabha	MPs in Rajya Sabha
Samajwadi Party			100 / 403	10 / 100	37 / 80	4 / 31
Indian National Congress			2 / 403	0 / 100	6 / 80	0 / 31
Communist Party of India (Marxist)			0 / 403	0 / 100	0 / 80	0 / 31
Communist Party of India			0 / 403	0 / 100	0 / 80	0 / 31
Communist Party of India (Marxist–Leninist) Liberation			0 / 403	0 / 100	0 / 80	0 / 31
Jan Adhikar Party			0 / 403	0 / 100	0 / 80	0 / 31
Lok Dal			0 / 403	0 / 100	0 / 80	0 / 31
Independents			0 / 403	0 / 100	0 / 80	1 / 31
Total			102 / 403	10 / 100	43 / 80	5 / 31

== Electoral performance ==
=== Uttar Pradesh Legislative Assembly Election ===
Year	Seats won	+/-	Voteshare (%)	+/- (%)	Popular vote	Status
2022	125 / 403	▲71	36.60%	▲8.53%	33,729,510	Opposition

== Past members ==
Party	Year of withdrawal
Suheldev Bharatiya Samaj Party	2022
Rashtriya Lok Dal	2024
Apna Dal (Kamerawadi)	2024
Janvadi Party(Socialist)	2024
