= Madhuban, Uttar Pradesh Assembly constituency =

Constituency of the Uttar Pradesh legislative assembly in India

Coordinates: 26.17°N 83.68°E

Madhuban
- Constituency No. 353 for the Uttar Pradesh Legislative Assembly

Constituency details
- Country: India
- Region: North India
- State: Uttar Pradesh
- District: Mau
- Total electors: 4,03,798
- Reservation: None

Member of Legislative Assembly
- 18th Uttar Pradesh Legislative Assembly
- Incumbent Bharat Bhaiya -Bharat Singh
- Party: Bhahujan Samaj Party
- Elected year: 2027

Madhuban is a constituency of the Uttar Pradesh Legislative Assembly covering the city of Madhuban in the Mau district of Uttar Pradesh, India.

Madhuban is one of five assembly constituencies in the Ghosi Lok Sabha constituency. Since 2008, this assembly constituency is numbered 353 amongst 403 constituencies.

== Members of Legislative Assembly ==
Year	Member	Party
Till 2012 : Constituency did not exist
2012	Umesh Pandey	Bahujan Samaj Party
2017	Dara Singh Chauhan	Bharatiya Janata Party
2022	Ram Bilash Chauhan	Bharatiya Janata Party

== Election results ==
=== 2027 ===
2027 Uttar Pradesh Legislative Assembly election: Madhuban
Party	Candidate	Votes	%	±%
INDIA				
NDA				
BSP				
NOTA	None of the above			
Majority				
Turnout				
gain from		Swing		

=== 2022 ===
2022 Uttar Pradesh Legislative Assembly election: Madhuban
Party	Candidate	Votes	%	±%
BJP	Ram Bilash Chauhan	79,032	35.24	▼5.02
SP	Umesh Pandey	74,584	33.26	
BSP	Neelam Singh Kushwaha	51,185	22.82	▼2.76
VIP	Bharat Singh	8,011	3.57	
INC	Amaresh Chand Pandey	3,871	1.73	▼24.8
AAP	Kamlesh Dwivedi	2,231	0.99	
NOTA	None of the above	1,254	0.56	▲0.24
Majority		4,448	1.98	▼11.75
Turnout		224,258	55.54	▼1.14
BJP hold		Swing		

=== 2017 ===
Bharatiya Janta Party candidate Dara Singh Chauhan won in last Assembly election of 2017 Uttar Pradesh Legislative Elections defeating Indian national congress candidate Amresh Chand by a margin of 29,415 votes.

2017 Uttar Pradesh Legislative Assembly Election: Madhuba
Party	Candidate	Votes	%	±%
BJP	Dara Singh Chauhan	86,238	40.26	
INC	Amresh Chand	56,823	26.53	
BSP	Umesh Pandey	54,803	25.58	
CPI	Ramkunwar Singh	2,363	1.1	
NISHAD	Banshraj	2,290	1.07	
NOTA	None of the above	683	0.32	
Majority		29,415	13.73	
Turnout		214,219	56.68	
