= Bidhuna Assembly constituency =

Constituency of the Uttar Pradesh legislative assembly in India

Coordinates: 26.80°N 79.51°E

Bidhuna
- Constituency No. 202 for the Uttar Pradesh Legislative Assembly

Constituency details
- Country: India
- Region: North India
- State: Uttar Pradesh
- District: Auraiya
- Total electors: 3,65,285 (2022)
- Reservation: None

Member of Legislative Assembly
- 18th Uttar Pradesh Legislative Assembly
- Incumbent Rekha Verma
- Party: Samajwadi Party
- Elected year: 2022

Bidhuna is a constituency of the Uttar Pradesh Legislative Assembly covering the city of Bidhuna in the Auraiya district of Uttar Pradesh, India.

Bidhuna is one of five assembly constituencies in the Kannauj Lok Sabha constituency. Since 2008, this assembly constituency is numbered 202 amongst 403 constituencies.

== Members of the Legislative Assembly ==
Election	Name	Party
2017	Vinay Shakya	Bharatiya Janata Party
2022	Rekha Verma	Samajwadi Party

== Election results ==
=== 2027 ===
2027 Uttar Pradesh Legislative Assembly election: Bidhuna
Party	Candidate	Votes	%	±%
INDIA				
NDA				
BSP				
NOTA	None of the above			
Majority				
Turnout				
gain from		Swing		

=== 2022 ===
Samajwadi Party candidate Rekha Verma won in 2022 Uttar Pradesh Legislative Elections defeating Bhartiya Janta Party candidate Riya Shakya by a margin of 7,765 votes.

2022 Uttar Pradesh Legislative Assembly election: Bidhuna
Party	Candidate	Votes	%	±%
SP	Rekha Verma	97,257	42.59	+6.87
BJP	Riya Shakya	89,492	39.19	+1.68
BSP	Gaurav Raghuvanshi	32,220	14.11	−10.33
Jan Adhikar Party	Sanjiv Kumar	3,927	1.72	+1.56
NOTA	None of the above	1,097	0.48	−0.1
Majority		7,765	3.4	+1.61
Turnout		228,340	62.61	+1.16
SP gain from BJP		Swing		

=== 2017 ===
2017 Uttar Pradesh Legislative Assembly Election: Bidhuna
Party	Candidate	Votes	%	±%
BJP	Vinay Shakya	81,905	37.51	
SP	Dinesh Kumar Verma	77,995	35.72	
BSP	Shiv Prasad Yadav	53,366	24.44	
NOTA	None of the above	1,270	0.58	
Majority		3,910	1.79	
Turnout		218,376	61.45	

=== 1967 ===
1967 Uttar Pradesh Legislative Assembly election: Bidhuna
Party	Candidate	Votes	%	±%
SSP	Ramadhar	18,027		
ABJS	Nawab Singh Yadav	15,421		
Majority		2,606		
Turnout				
SSP gain from		Swing		
