= Gauri Shankar Verma =

Indian politician

Gauri Shankar Harcharan Verma

Member of the Uttar Pradesh legislative assembly
- Incumbent
- Assumed office 2022
- Governor: Anandiben Patel
- Constituency: Orai

Personal details
- Born: Gaurishankar Harcharan Verma; 1 July 1964 (age 61) Konch, Jalaun district, Uttar Pradesh
- Citizenship: Indian
- Party: Bhartiya Janata Party
- Spouse: Krishna Devi Verma
- Parent: Harcharanji Verma (father)
- Profession: Contractor, Social worker
- Nickname: Vermaji

Gauri Shankar Verma is an Indian politician, social worker and current Member of legislative assembly for Orai constituency of Uttar Pradesh and member of Bhartiya Janata Party. He is Member of legislative assembly from 2017 elections. Mr. Verma belongs to the Koli caste of Uttar Pradesh.
