= Zahid Beg =

Indian politician

Member of the Uttar Pradesh Legislative Assembly
- Incumbent
- Assumed office March 2022
- Preceded by: Rabindra Nath Tripathi
- Constituency: Bhadohi, Bhadohi

Personal details
- Born: 3 June 1964 (age 61) Bhadohi, Uttar Pradesh
- Party: Samajwadi Party
- Parent: Late Dr. Yusuf Beg
- Profession: Politician

Zahid Beg is an Indian politician who served as a Member of the 16th Uttar Pradesh Legislative Assembly from Bhadohi from 2012 to 2017 and re-elected in 2022. His father Late Yusuf Beg was elected as a Member of parliament to Lok Sabha from the Mirzapur and was Indian labour leader who served as the Vice President of Hind Mazdoor Kisan Panchayat.

Zahid Jamal Beg (also spelled Zahid Baig) is an Indian politician and a member of the Samajwadi Party. He serves as a Member of the Legislative Assembly (MLA) from the Bhadohi constituency in Uttar Pradesh.

== Political career ==
- Elected as a Member of the Legislative Assembly of Uttar Pradesh in 2012 and 2022 Uttar Pradesh Legislative Assembly elections representing the Bhadohi constituency as a member of the Samajwadi Party.
- Member of the Legislative Library Committee 2012–2013
- Former District President of Samajwadi Party from District, Bhadohi.

== Legal issues and controversies ==
=== Death of domestic worker and related allegations ===
In September 2024, FIR was registered against Beg and his wife under various sections related to assault, child labour, bonded labour, and abetment of suicide.

=== Arrest and bail proceedings ===
Following the registration of the case, police initiated action against Beg. According to media reports, he later surrendered before authorities and was remanded to judicial custody.

In 2025, the Allahabad High Court granted bail to Beg in cases related to bonded labour and human trafficking.

In separate proceedings concerning the suicide case, the court granted him bail, while his wife was granted anticipatory bail.

== See also ==
- Politics of Uttar Pradesh
- Samajwadi Party
