= Hriday Narayan Singh Patel =

Indian politician

Member of the 18th Uttar Pradesh Assembly
- Incumbent
- Assumed office 2022

Personal details
- Party: Samajwadi Party
- Occupation: Politician
- Profession: Surgeon

Hriday Narayan Singh Patel is an Indian politician of the Samajwadi Party. He is a member of the 18th Uttar Pradesh Assembly, representing the Sagri Assembly constituency.

== Early life and education ==
Narayan's profession is surgeon & partner Ramrati Hospital, proprietor Ramrati Ultrasound Clinic.

Hriday Narayan Singh Patel's educational qualifications are Post Graduate.
