= Rekha Verma (born 1961) =

Indian politician

Rekha Verma (born 1 July 1961) is an Indian politician from Uttar Pradesh. She is an MLA from Bidhuna Assembly constituency in Auraiya district. She represents Samajwadi Party. She won the 2022 Uttar Pradesh Legislative Assembly election.

== Early life and education ==
Verma is from Bidhuna. She was born in Kanpur to late Dhaniam and late Ram Devi. She served as a Principal of Adarsh Kanya Inter College Purva Sujan, Auraiya. She married Mahesh Chandra on 11 March 1978. Her husband Mahesh Chandra died.

== Career ==
Verma won the 2022 Uttar Pradesh Legislative Assembly election from Bidhuna Assembly constituency representing Samajwadi Party. She polled 92,757 votes and defeated Riya Shakya of Bharatiya Janata Party by a margin of 3,265 votes.
