= Achhalda =

- Town
- Location in Uttar Pradesh, India
- Coordinates: 26°43′N 79°25′E
- Country: India
- State: Uttar Pradesh
- District: Auraiya

Population (2001)
  - Total: 8,361

Languages
  - Official: Hindi
- Time zone: UTC+5:30 (IST)

Achhalda is a town and nagar panchayat in the Auraiya district in the Indian state of Uttar Pradesh. It is also spelled as Achalda.

== Overview ==
Achhalda is one of the sub-divisional towns of Auraiya District. This township is situated to the north of Auraiya, the district headquarters, and 15km away from Bidhuna, another major town in the district. Dibiyapur (Dibiapur), Phaphund and Sarai Ajitmal are neighboring towns.

Achhalda Railway Station is linked directly to Delhi and Kanpur. Duhalla Village is on Pasaiya Road with in 1.5km.

== Demographics ==
As of the 2001 India census, Achhalda had a population of 8,361. Males constitute 53% of the population and females 47%. Achhalda has an average literacy rate of 70%, higher than the national average of 59.5%; with 58% of the males and 42% of females literate. 15% of the population is under 6 years of age.

== Geography ==
Achhalda is located at 26° 43' N 79° 25' E. It has an average elevation of 134 meters (442 feet).
