= National Highway 91A (India, old numbering) =

Old numbering of road in India

National Highway 91A

Route information
- Length: 126 km (78 mi)

Major junctions
- From: Etawah, Uttar Pradesh
- NH 2 in Etawah; NH 91 in Kannauj
- To: Kannauj, Uttar Pradesh

Location
- Country: India
- States: Uttar Pradesh: 126 km (78 mi)
- Primary destinations: Etawah - Bharthana - Bidhuna - Bela, Auraiya - Kannauj

Highway system
- Roads in India; Expressways; National; State; Asian
| ← NH 91 | → NH 92 |

National Highway 91A (NH 91A) was an Indian National Highway entirely within the state of Uttar Pradesh. NH 91A links Etawah on old NH 2 with Kannauj on old NH 91 and was 126 km (78 mi) long. In 2010, the highway was renumbered to form part of present-day NH 234.

== See also ==
- List of national highways in India
- National Highways Development Project
