= Umrain =

Coordinates: 26°55′N 79°22′E

- town
- Interactive map of Umrain
- Country: India
- State: Uttar Pradesh
- District: Auraiya

Area
  - Total: 2 km^{2} (0.77 sq mi)

Population (2010)
  - Total: 10,172
  - Density: 148/km^{2} (380/sq mi)

Languages
  - Official: Hindi
- Time zone: UTC+5:30 (IST)
- PIN: 206252
- Telephone code: 05681-
- Vehicle registration: UP-79
- Coastline: 0 kilometres (0 mi)
- Nearest city: Bidhuna
- Sex ratio: 1000:912 ♂/♀
- Literacy: 75%
- Lok Sabha constituency: Kannoj
- Avg. summer temperature: 34–47 °C (93–117 °F)
- Avg. winter temperature: 4–16 °C (39–61 °F)

Umrain is a sub-divisional town of the Auraiya district in the state of Uttar Pradesh, India. It is located northwest of Auraiya, the district headquarters. Neighboured by Airwa-Katra, Bidhuna, and Harnagarpur, and Usrahaar, Umrain is linked directly to Kishni and Bidhuna Road.

== Demographics ==
As of the 2011 census, Umrain had a population of 10,172; 54% of which were males and 46% females. It has an average literacy rate of 80%, higher than the national average of 59.5%. Its male literacy rate is 88%, while its female literacy rate is 68%. In Umrain, 12% of the population is under 6 years of age. Umrain is home to Van Khandeshwar Mahadev, an ancient Shiv Temple.

Language and script

A 1981 census showed that western Hindi was spoken by about 96.8% of Umrain's population, with about 3.1% of people speaking Hindustani or Urdu.

Harijans

In Umrain, around 10% of the population are harijans, 15% of which are Muslims, 23% Guptas, and 17% Shakyas.

== Geography ==
Umrain is located at 26° 43' 0N 79° 25' 0E. It has an average elevation of 136 meters (448 feet).
