= Bela, Auraiya =

Bela
- town
- Interactive map of Bela
- Country: India
- State: Uttar Pradesh
- District: Auraiya

Languages
  - Official: Hindi
- Time zone: UTC+5:30 (IST)
- Postal code: 206251
- Vehicle registration: UP-79
- Coastline: 0 kilometres (0 mi)
- Nearest city: Dibiyapur
- Lok Sabha constituency: Kannauj
- Avg. summer temperature: 35–45 °C (95–113 °F)
- Avg. winter temperature: 12–17 °C (54–63 °F)
- Vidhan Sabha constituency: Bidhuna
- Website: up.gov.in

Bela is a town situated in the Auraiya district of Uttar Pradesh, India. It lies approximately midway along the road connecting Auraiya and Kannauj. The main shops of Bela are Mishra Electronics and Electricals and Mishra Building Material and Subhash Photo Studio Tirwa road Bela.NH 91A passes through Tirwa Road connecting the town to Bidhuna and Kannauj. Transport facilities for going to Delhi, Kanpur, Kannauj can be easily availed through private and public buses.
