= Ram Bux Singh =

Dr. Ram Bux Singh
- Born: Dr. Ram Bux Singh; 13 August 1925; Ramnagar, Ramkot, Sitapur, Lucknow division, United Provinces of Agra and Oudh, Bristish India
- Died: 18 September 2016; Lucknow, Uttar Pradesh
- Education: Diploma in Mechanical Engineering from Asia Engineering Institute, Delhi, India PG in Mechanical Engineering from Pacific Western University, California, US Master of Applied Science Doctor of Technological Philosophy
- Scientific career
- Fields: Biogas technology, clean fuel, sustainable energy , renewable energy, Anaerobic digestion, Gobar gas plant, Wind energy , solar energy

Dr. Ram Bux Singh (13 August 1925 - 18 September 2016) was an Indian scientist, author and pioneer in biogas and renewable energy. He is best known for inaugurating one of India's earliest successful gobar gas plants – for the production of biogas from the anaerobic digestion of cow dung (gobar) – on 9 September 1957 in Ramnagar, Sitapur district, Uttar Pradesh. The inauguration was attended by Shri Govind Narain, ICS Chief Secretary of Uttar Pradesh Government. This plant, distinguished by its unique design and functionality, marked the beginning of a new era in sustainable energy. His work significantly advanced biogas technology in India. In addition to his contributions in India, Singh played a key role in the global adoption of biogas. In 1972, he helped establish the first gobar gas plant in the United States. He also served as a consultant to the United Nations, contributing to renewable energy projects in over fifteen countries, including the US, Germany, and Denmark. Dr. Singh authored several influential works on biogas technology.

== Early life and education ==
Ram Bux Singh was born on 13 August 1925 in the village of Ramnagar Sitapur, United Provinces of Agra and Oudh, then part of the British Raj. He completed his early education up to the 12th grade at the local village school in Sitapur. Where he lived a normal life in a middle-class family. During his formative years, he developed an interest in science and sustainable energy practices, influenced by the rural environment around him. Singh observed traditional rural practices involving cow dung and noted that when organic waste such as dung was allowed to decompose in a closed environment, it produced methane gas. He recognized that this gas could be collected and used as a source of fuel for cooking. These early observations helped shape his understanding of renewable energy derived from biological waste and later influenced his work in the development of biogas technology.

Singh pursued a diploma in mechanical engineering from the Asia Engineering Institute in New Delhi, India. He then continued his studies internationally, earning a postgraduate degree in mechanical engineering from Pacific Western University in California, United States.

In addition to his postgraduate studies, Singh obtained a Master of Applied Science and a Doctor of Technological Philosophy degree, further deepening his expertise in the field of renewable energy. Throughout his educational journey, Singh's focus remained on developing sustainable energy solutions, which later became the cornerstone of his pioneering work in biogas technology.

He established his first experimental biogas plant in Ramnagar in 1957. This was later visited by then Union Minister, S. K. Dey, and the chief secretary of Uttar Pradesh, IAS Govindnarayan, after which he started getting government support.

He later met block development officer D. S. Sisodiya (later director of training institute, Uttarakhand) with whom he moved to Chinnat, Lucknow. He worked in cookery sector to make money for his projects.

== Gobar Gas Research Station, Ajitmal ==
He worked in the Planning, Research and Action Division (PRAD) of the State Planning Institute in the Gobar Gas Research Station at Ajitmal located in present-day Auraiya (formerly part of Etawah district), Uttar Pradesh, was established as one of the earliest organized research facilities in Asia dedicated to biogas and methane production from organic waste. The station is associated with the work of Ram Bux Singh, who served as its officer-in-charge for many years alongside his friend, D.S. Sisodia, who was a bureaucratic officer there.

Experimental biogas plants were developed at the Ajitmal site to study the production of methane from cow dung and other agricultural residues. These installations were designed to examine digestive performance, gas yield, and practical applications for rural energy needs. During Singh's tenure, the biogas plant at Ajitmal was stabilized and made fully operational in 1960, allowing for sustained experimentation and demonstration.

The research station functioned as both a scientific and demonstration centre, receiving visits from engineers, scientists, policymakers, and international delegates interested in non-conventional energy. The facility also attracted national attention; among its notable visitors was V. V. Giri, Ex. President of India, whose visit reflected the growing institutional interest in biogas research during that period.

The work conducted at the Ajitmal research station contributed to early biogas development efforts in India and informed later renewable energy and rural fuel programs. The station is regarded as an important early example of applied research in decentralized and sustainable energy systems.

== Work in rural India ==
Dr. Ram Bux Singh was involved in biogas-related activities in rural areas of India. His work focused on the application of biogas systems using organic waste for basic household and agricultural energy needs. These activities formed part of broader efforts to study decentralized energy options in rural settings.

== Innovations in biogas and sustainable energy ==
Dr. Singh's time with the Gas Council in London led to the development of innovative Gobar Gas burners and stoves. His insights revolutionized waste management and fuel production methods. Additionally, he observed the construction of over 200 low-cost biogas digesters and waste processors designed to convert plant and animal waste into manure fertilizer and methane for fuel. His work gained international recognition through publications like The Whole Earth Catalog, Mother Earth News, and Architectural Design. Despite efficiency challenges—such as lower energy content in methane due to the dry nature of Indian cow manure—his contributions laid the foundation for sustainable rural energy solutions in India and beyond.

In 1974, Singh published Biogas Plant: Generating Methane from Organic Wastes, brought out by the Gobar Gas Research Station, Ajitmal (then Etawah district), Uttar Pradesh. The book presents a comprehensive treatment of biogas technology, covering the scientific background of anaerobic digestion, the working principles of biogas plants, design parameters, multiple plant designs, as well as practical guidance on construction, operation, and utilization of biogas and slurry. Because of its detailed technical coverage and practical orientation, the work has been described by some authors and practitioners as the “bible” of biogas technology and it is held in the collection of the United States Library of Congress.

== Work in the United States ==
Ram Bux Singh was associated with early efforts related to biogas technology in the United States during the early 1970s. His work occurred in the context of growing interest in alternative energy sources and the utilization of organic waste for fuel.

In June 1972, a biogas plant, with which Singh was technically involved, was inaugurated in the United States. The inauguration of his first gobar gas plant was attended by Senator Mike Gravel from Alaska. Available sources describe the installation as an early example of a functional biogas system in the country. His role included providing technical input on plant operation and assisting in achieving stable methane production under local conditions.

During this period, Dr. Singh interacted with individuals and groups engaged in renewable energy research. His work was referenced in discussions and publications related to biogas and non-conventional energy systems. These activities contributed to early awareness and experimentation with biogas technology in the United States.

He also showed the working of a solar energy biogas plant at that time.

In an editorial published in January 2016, environmental scholar R. K. Pachauri—then Director-General of The Energy and Resources Institute (TERI) and former Chairman of the Intergovernmental Panel on Climate Change (IPCC)—recalled his interactions during the early 1970s while pursuing doctoral studies in the United States with U.S. Senator Gaylord Nelson, a pioneer of environmental policy. Pachauri noted that Senator Nelson had met Ram Bux Singh, at the time an employee of the Government of Uttar Pradesh and a promoter of biogas technology on a large scale in India, and had appended a write-up describing Singh's work to a bill submitted to the United States Congress seeking funding for biogas research and technology dissemination. The account situates Singh's early biogas initiatives within broader international environmental and climate-policy discussions that later informed global efforts, including those led by the IPCC, which under Pachauri's chairmanship was awarded the Nobel Peace Prize in 2007.

His work was also acknowledged by the United States Senate, as "special references were made about his work had been a topic of discussions in U.S. Congress Senate Select Committee on Small Business PROCEEDING".

An article in Mother Earth News described Singh as “perhaps the father of methane development in the United States,” reflecting his early involvement in biogas experimentation and knowledge exchange during the 1970s energy crisis.

== United Nations consultancy and international work ==
Singh was associated with international activities related to biogas and renewable energy during the mid to late 20th century, a period when non-conventional energy systems were being examined by governments and international organizations for rural and agricultural use.

He was associated with biogas-related projects connected to the United Nations, where he worked in a consultative and technical capacity. His involvement included providing technical observations and inputs related to the design, operation, and adaptation of biogas plants intended for use in agricultural and rural environments. The work primarily addressed operational factors such as digester performance, organic feedstock use, and system functioning under varying climatic conditions.

In addition to activities linked to the United Nations, Singh was involved in biogas-related work in multiple countries. These included the United States, Germany, Denmark, Canada, Iran, Mexico, and Costa Rica, among others. His role in these settings generally consisted of technical consultation, participation in discussions on biogas systems, and involvement with pilot or demonstration installations.

Singh's international engagements formed part of broader efforts during that period to study and apply biogas technology in different regional contexts. His work contributed to technical exchanges concerning methane production from organic waste across national and institutional settings.

He once presented his research at the White House in Washington D.C.

== Later years and death ==
He spent his later years in his native village of Ramnagar, Sitapur, spending his life in nature. He died at age of 91 on 18 September 2016, in Lucknow while suffering a double dengue fever.

== Recognition ==
He was awarded honorary degrees as Master of Applied Science and Doctor of Technological Philosophy from the Pacific Western University. Dr. Singh's birthplace is Sitapur, and the district's official government website lists him as a "famous personality", stating that his honorary degrees "[recognize] his sustained contributions to the field of non-conventional energy".

On 26 September 2023, the National Archives of India, under Ministry of Culture, Government of India, acquired a collection representing Dr. Singh's work. These historic records are now freely accessible worldwide via the Abhilekh Patal portal.

During the Philatelic Advisory Committee meeting held on 26 November 2024 in New Delhi, the proposal to issue a commemorative stamp in honor of Dr. Singh on the occasion of his centenary birth celebration on 13 August 2025 was approved.
