= Niranjanapur, Uttar Pradesh =

Niranjanapur
- Village
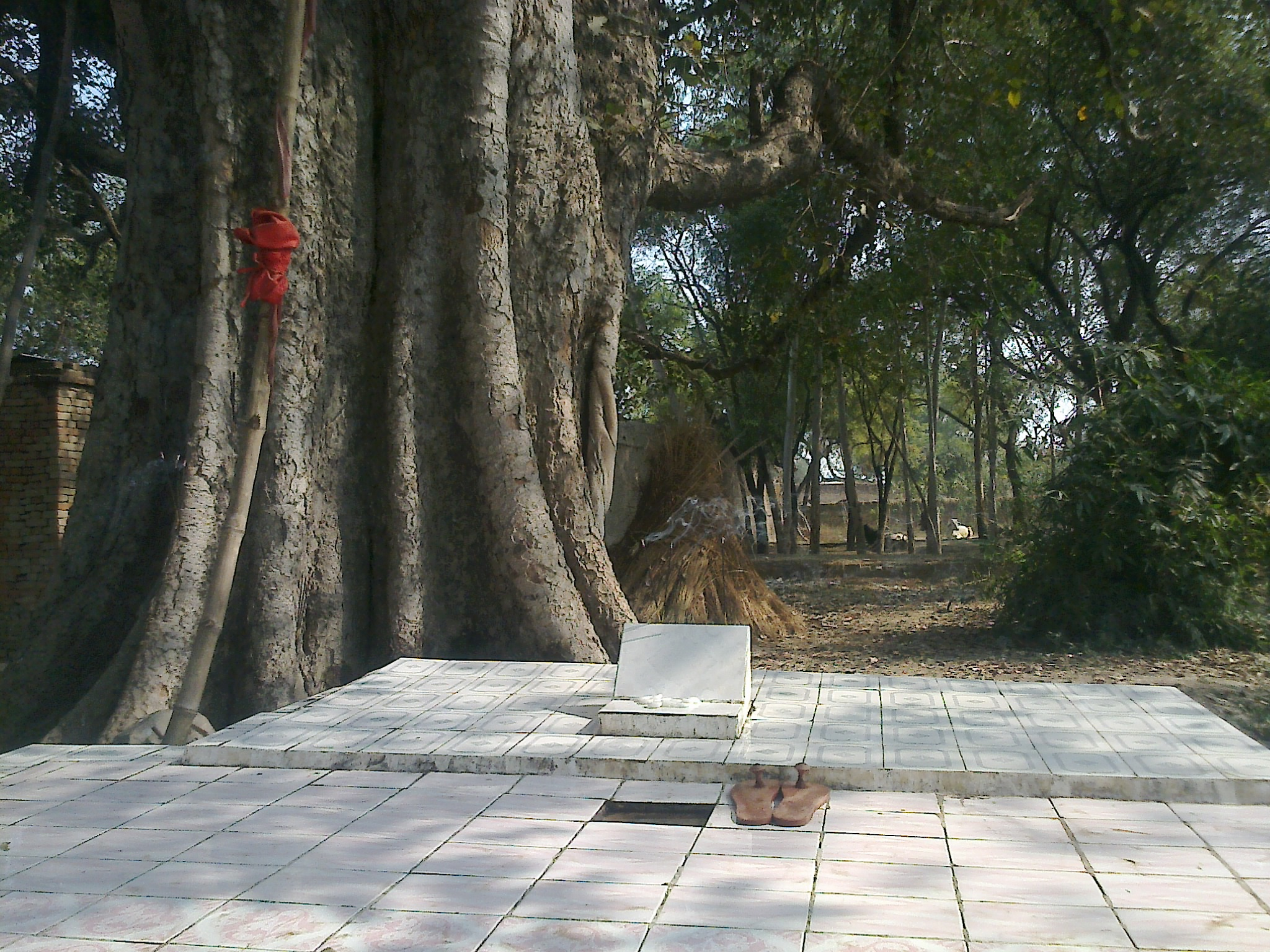

- Location within Uttar Pradesh
- Coordinates: 26°38′41″N 79°34′54″E
- Country: India
- Province: Uttar Pradesh
- District: Auraiya district
- Tehsil: Bidhuna

Area
  - Total: 1.19 km^{2} (0.46 sq mi)
- Elevation: 135 m (443 ft)

Population (2011 census)
  - Total: 630
  - Density: 530/km^{2} (1,400/sq mi)
- Time zone: UTC+5.30 (IST)

Niranjanapur or Niranjanpur is a village in the Bidhuna tehsil of Auraiya District in Uttar Pradesh, India.

== History ==
On 17 September 1997 two tehsils named Auraiya and Bidhuna were separated from district Etawah to form the new district named as Auraiya. Since then Niranjanapur falls in the territory of District Auraiya.

== Geography ==
Niranjanapur lies in the south-western portion of Uttar Pradesh 26°38′41″N 79°34′54″E and also is a part of Kanpur Division. The village is situated in the central doab region of District Auraiya in the state of Uttar Pradesh. It is situated 5 kilometers north-east of town Dibiyapur.

It covers an area of 1.19 km^{2} (0.46 sq mi), of which more than one-third (78.65 hectares) is irrigated area. Though the village lacks in any flow water body, but it does contain 3 ponds, few wells & tubewells.

=== Climate ===
The Village features an atypical version of the humid subtropical climate. Summers are long and the weather is extremely hot from early April to mid-October, with the monsoon season in between. The average annual rainfall in the region is 792 mm. About 85% of the annual normal rainfall in the region is received during the south west monsoon months from June to September, August being the rainiest month. The brief, mild winter starts in late November, peaks in January and heavy fog often occurs.

=== Land ===
Total Area of the village is 119 hectares. The area of cultivable land in the village is 78.65 hectares.

== Architecture ==
The architecture of the houses is original and unique. Most of them are built with mud, but there are also new houses, using bricks & cement.

== Population ==
According to 2011 census of India the population of the village is 630. Among these 334 are males & 296 are females. The sex ratio of the village is 886 females per 1,000 men. Since the end of the 20th century the population has decreased very quickly. Most of the inhabitants went to the bigger towns and cities. Few houses have been abandoned and began to self-demolish.

== Transport ==
The Village is well equipped with road as it is being the major way of transportation in the region. Nearest Major town, Dibiyapur is at 6 km distance.

== Picture gallery ==
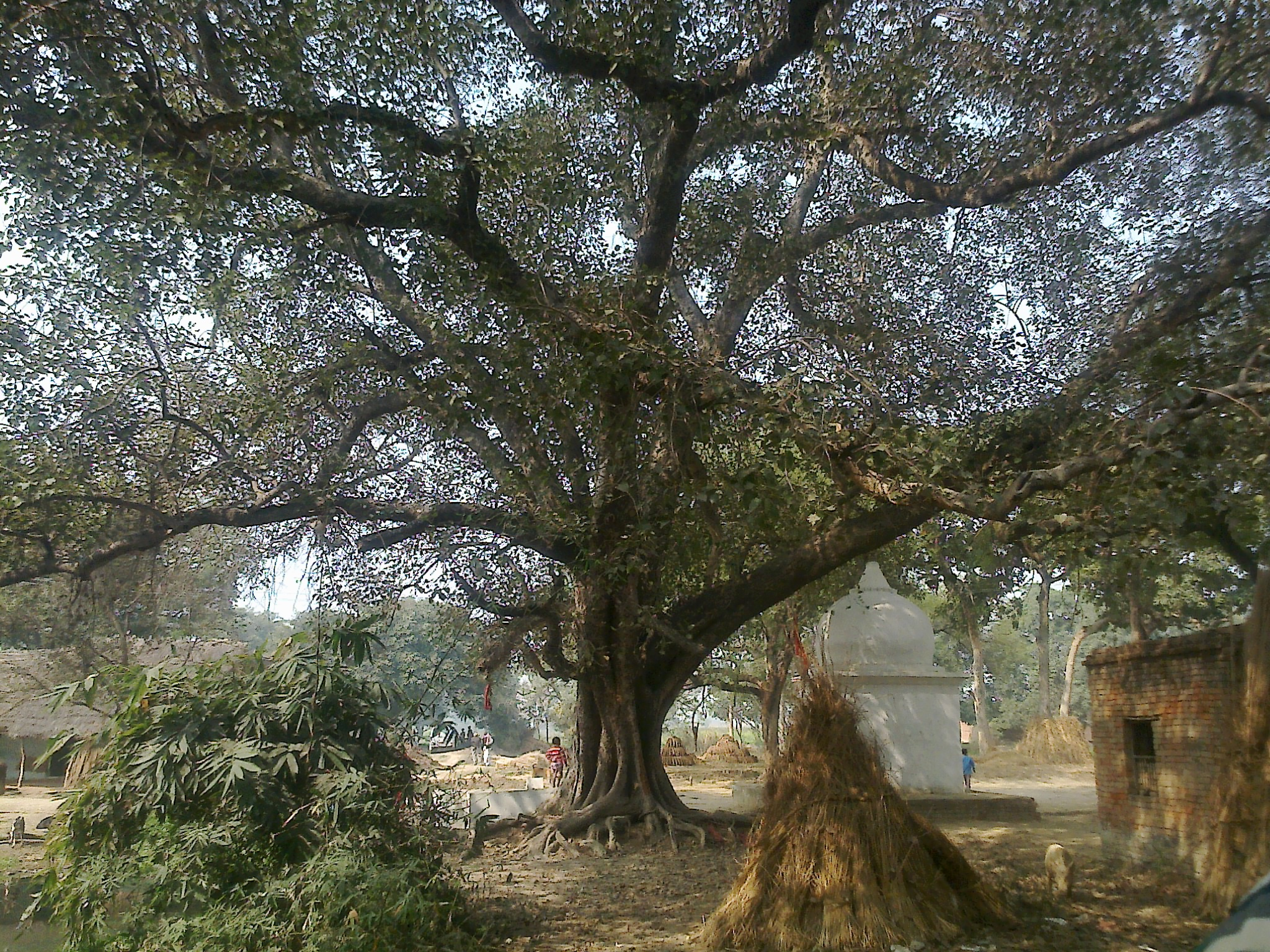
Peepal Tree

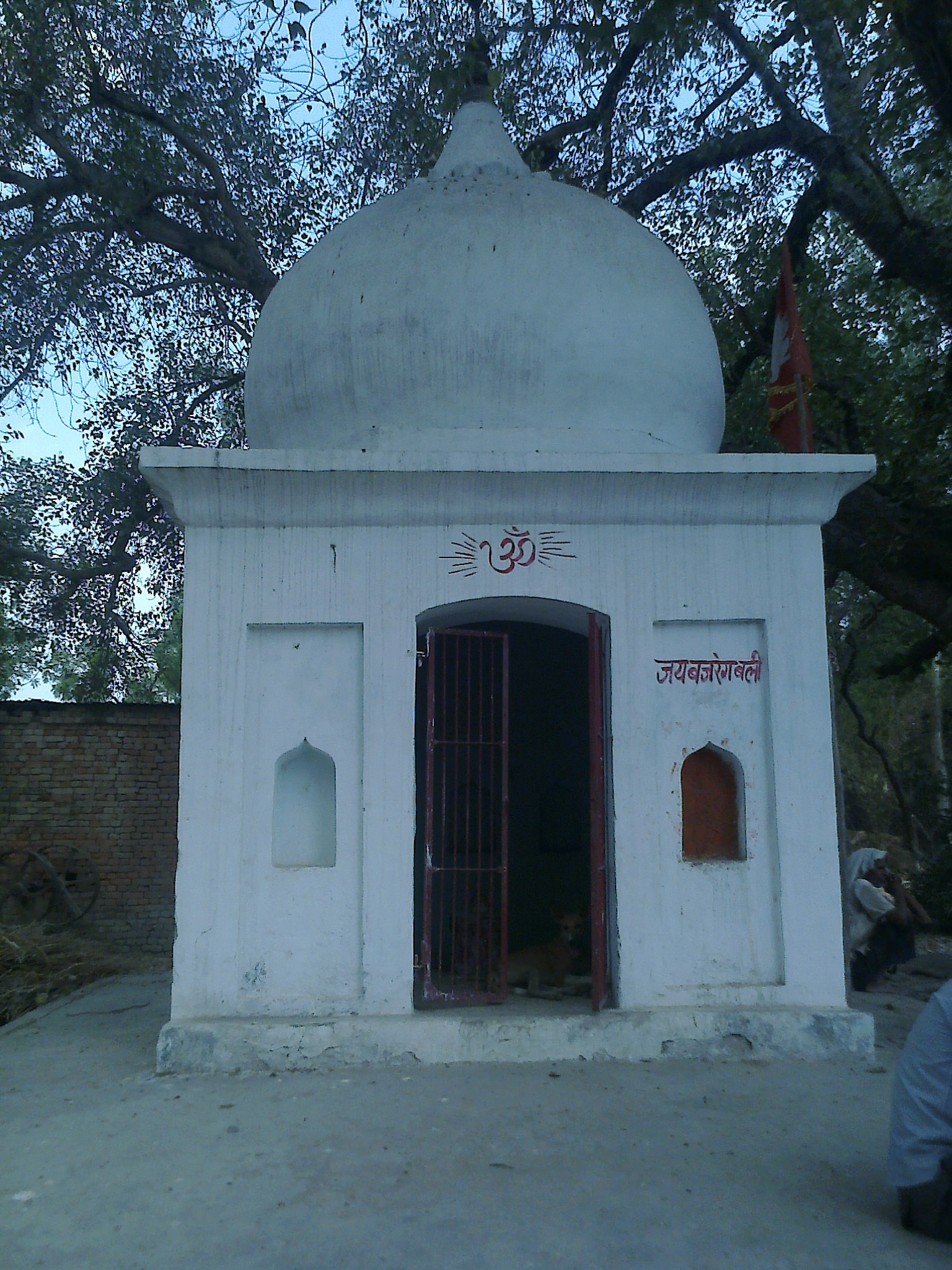
Temple

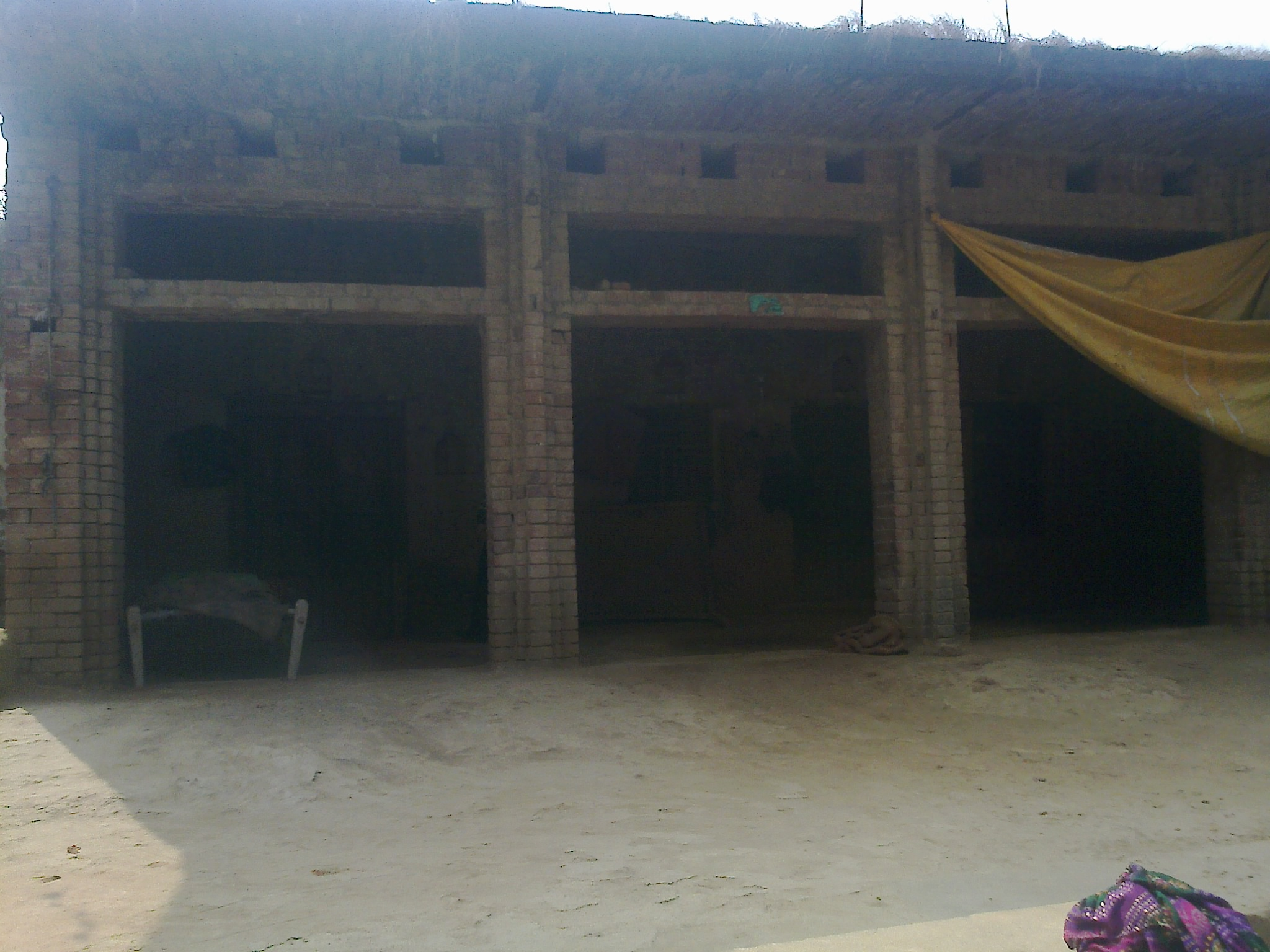
House in Village

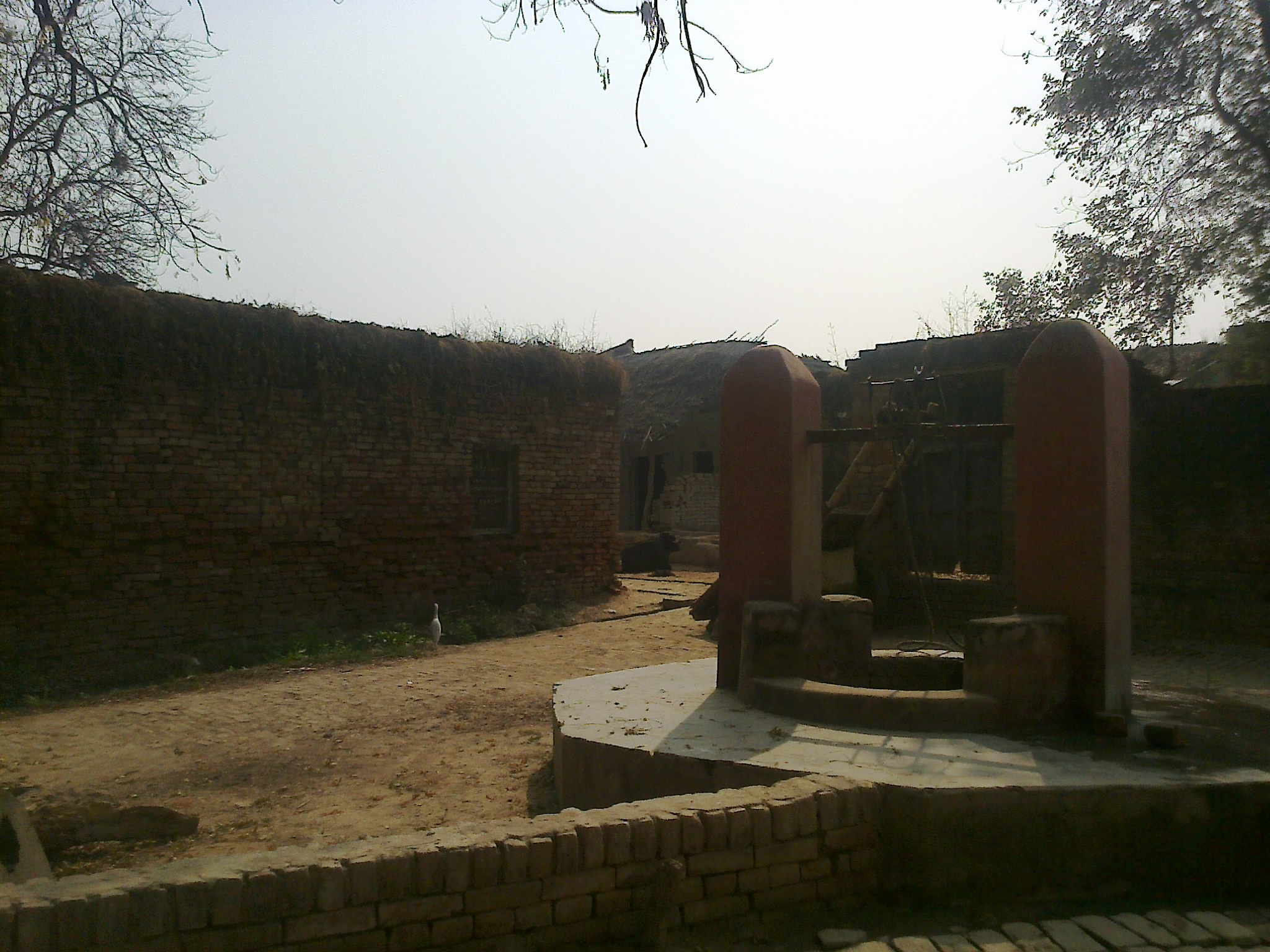
Water Well

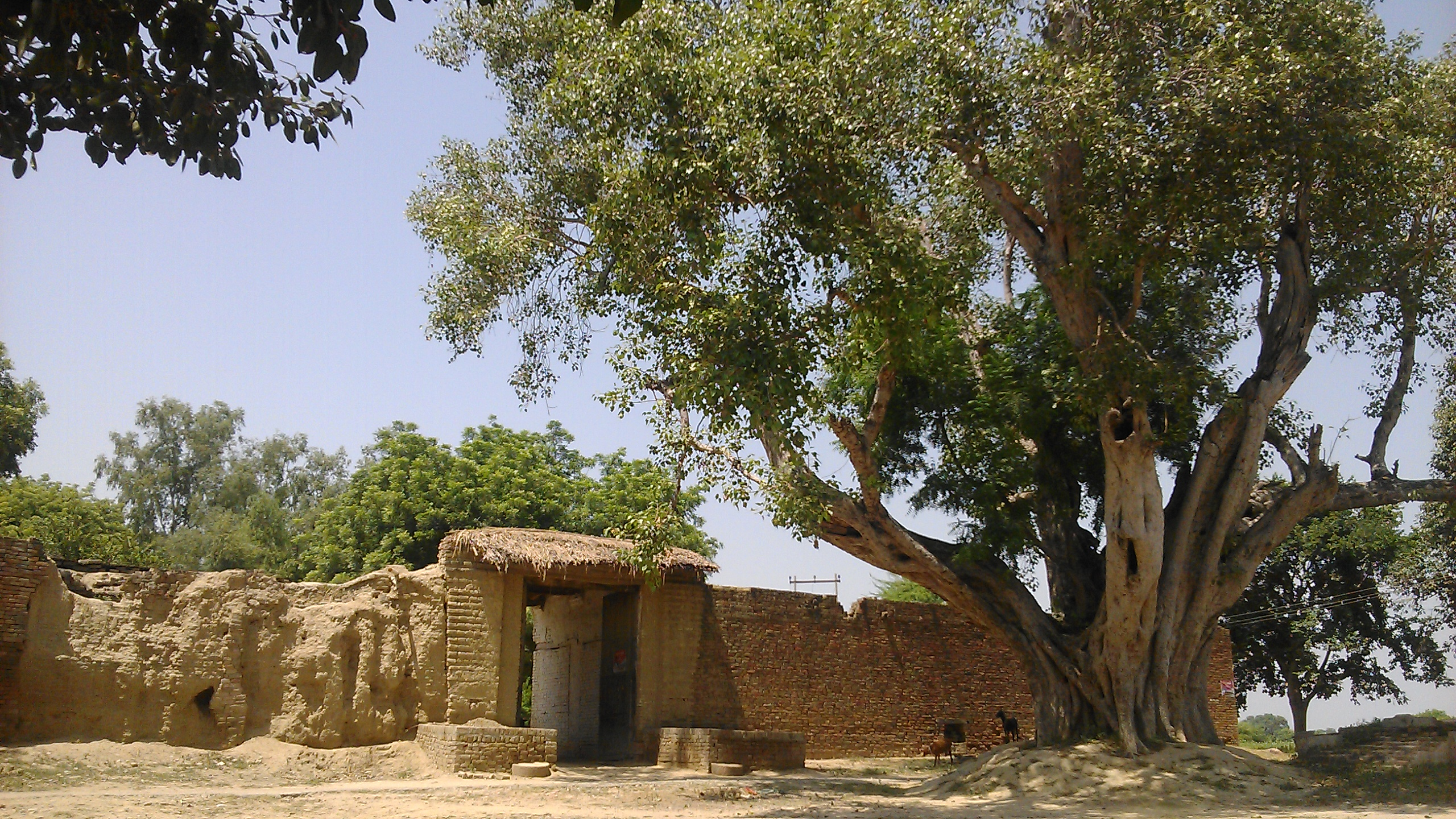
Peepal Tree

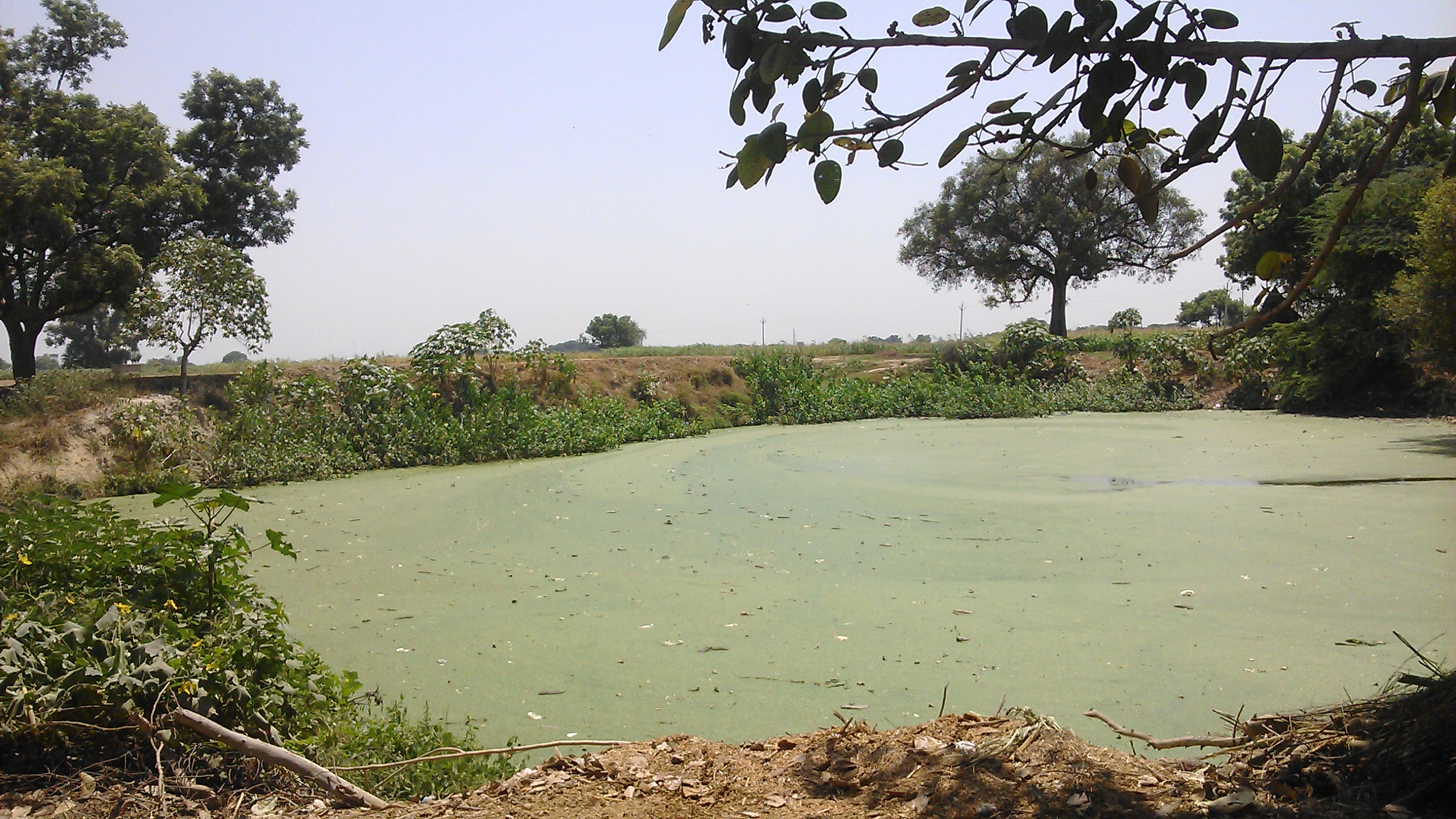
Pond

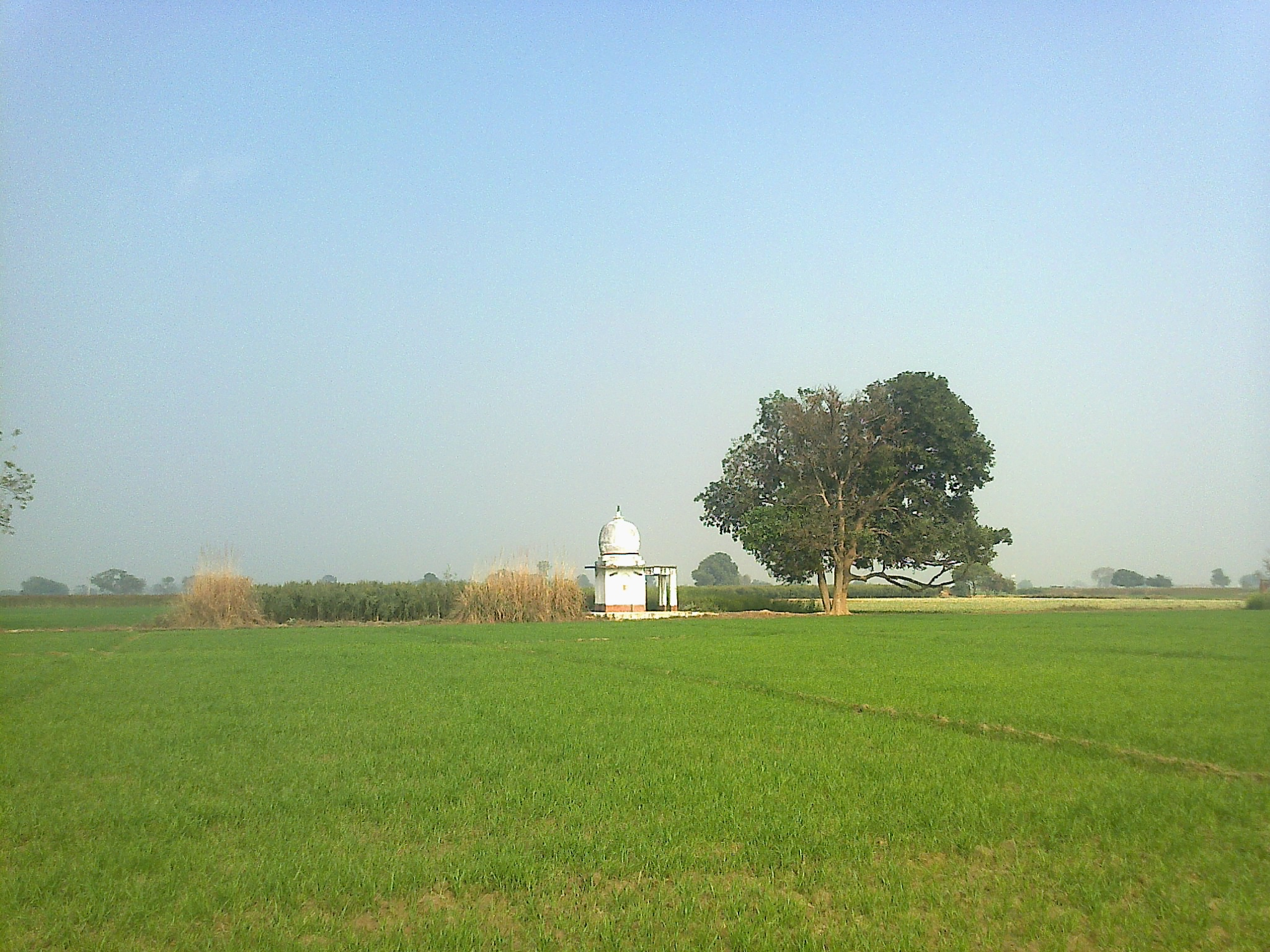
Crop Field

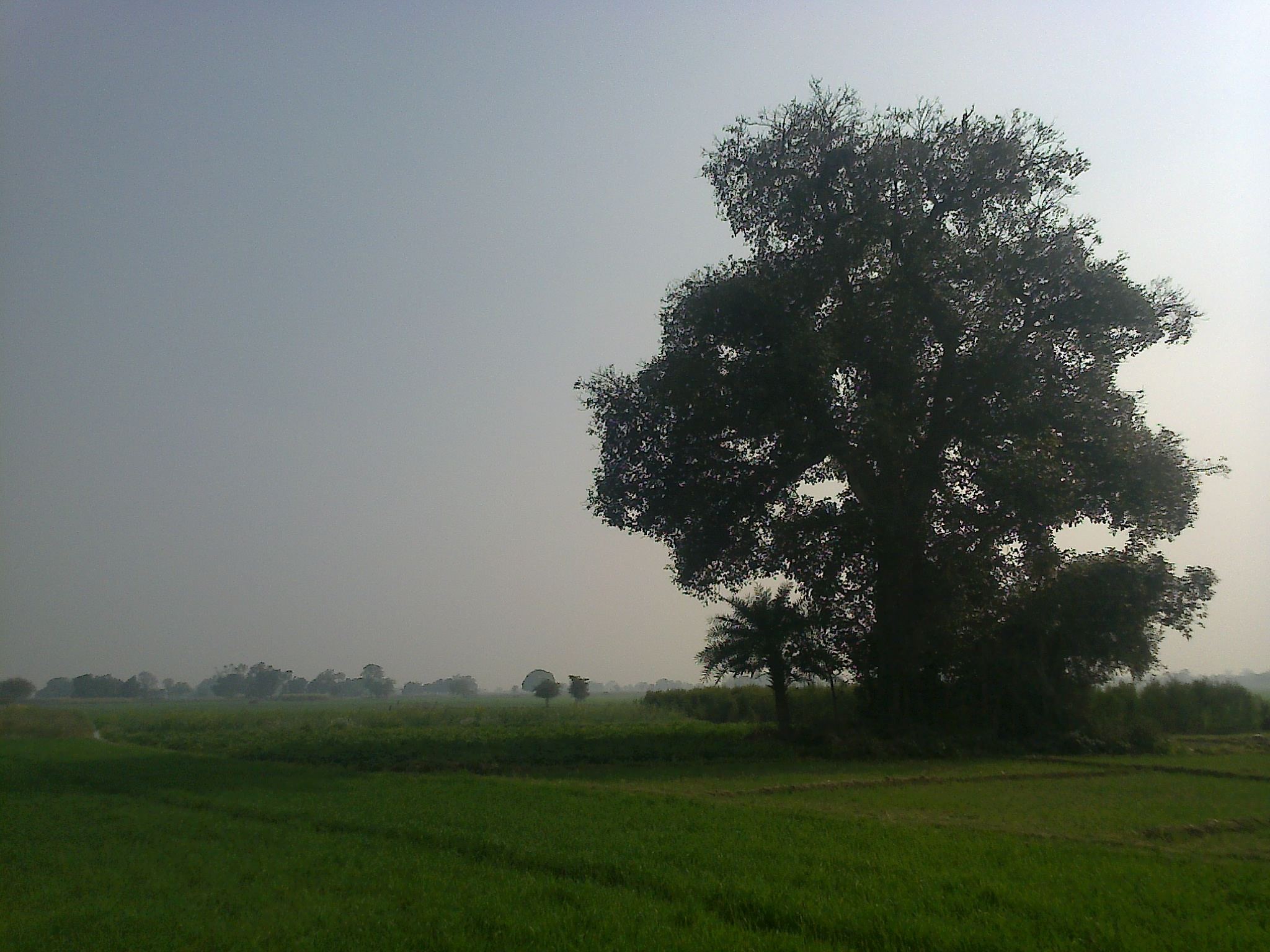
Crop Field

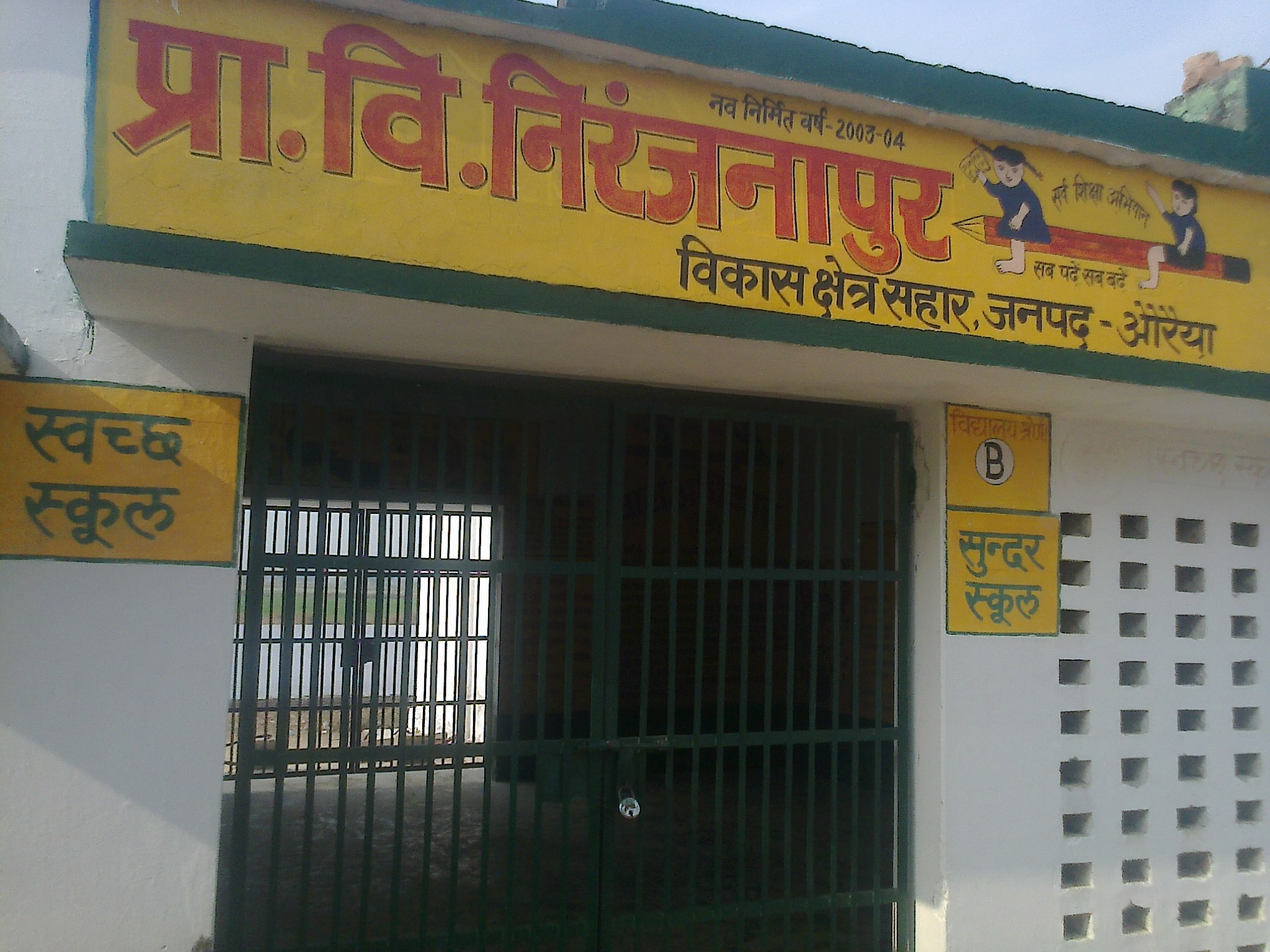
Secondary School

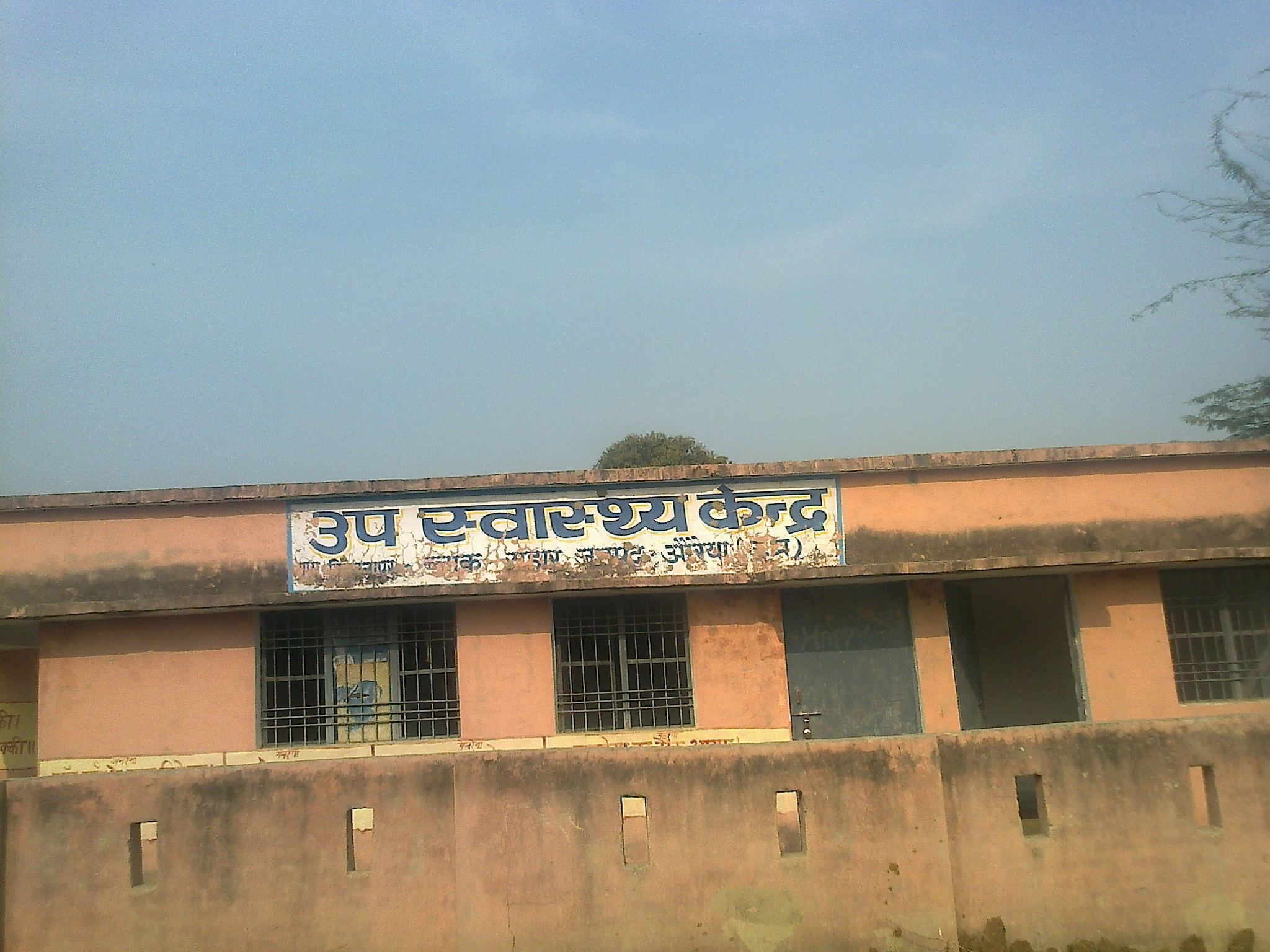
Health Center

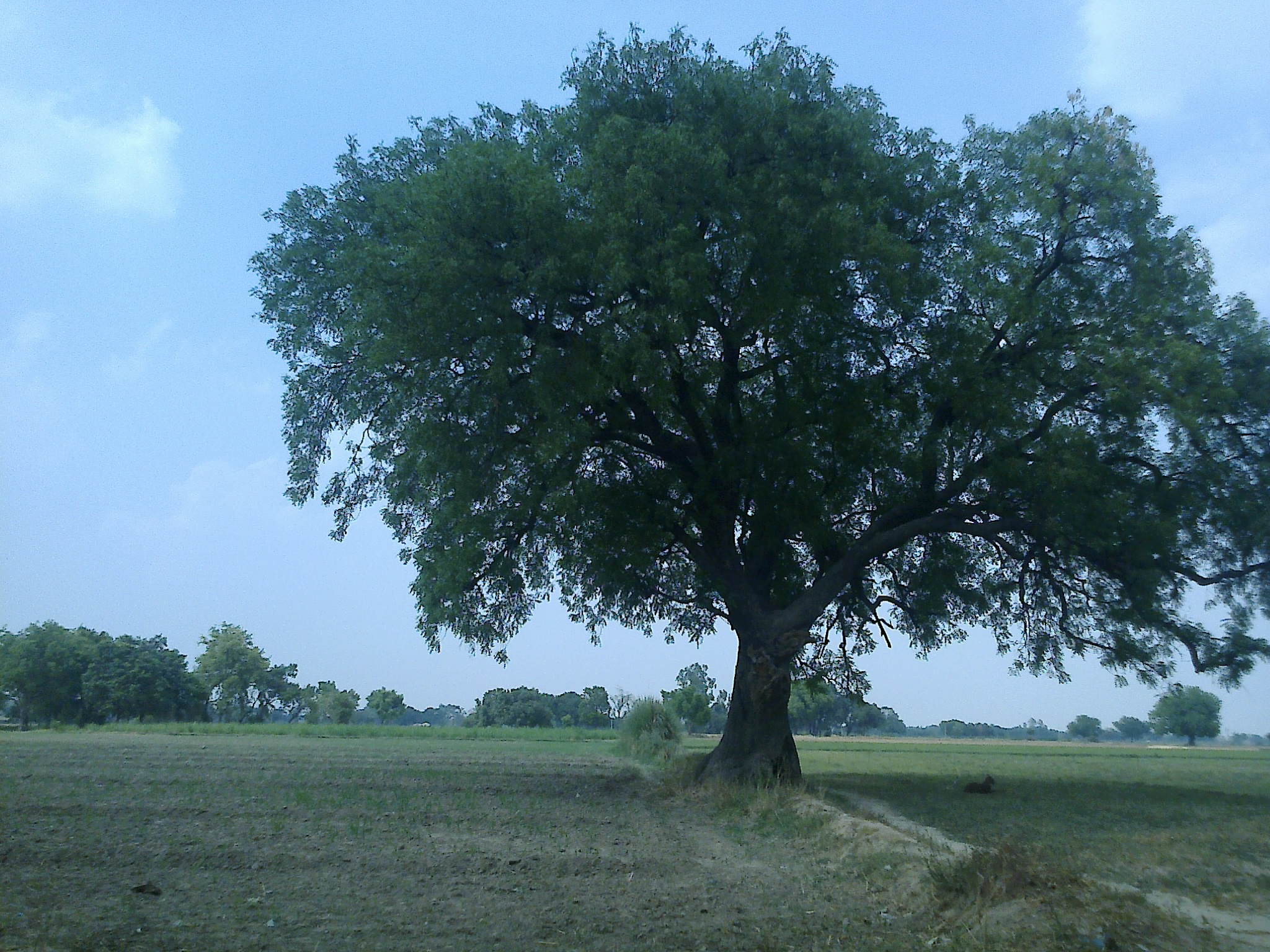
Neem Tree
