= Lakhan Singh =

Indian politician

Minister of State, Government of Uttar Pradesh
- In office August 2019 – March 2022

MLA, 17th Legislative Assembly
- In office March 2017 – March 2022
- Succeeded by: Pradeep Kumar Yadav
- Constituency: Dibiyapur constituency

Personal details
- Party: Bharatiya Janata Party
- Occupation: MLA
- Profession: Politician

Lakhan Singh is an Indian politician and a member of 17th Legislative Assembly, Uttar Pradesh of India. He represents the ‘Dibiyapur’ constituency in Auraiya district of Uttar Pradesh.

== Political career ==
Lakhan Singh contested Uttar Pradesh Assembly Election as Bharatiya Janata Party candidate and defeated his close contestant Pradeep Kumar Yadav from Samajwadi Party with a margin of 12,094 votes.

He has been appointed Minister of state in a Yogi Adityanath cabinet on 21 August 2019.

== Posts held ==
| # | From | To | Position | Comments |
|---|---|---|---|---|
| 01 | 2017 | Incumbent | Member, 17th Legislative Assembly | |
