= Pradeep Kumar Yadav =

Member of the Uttar Pradesh Legislative Assembly

Member of Uttar Pradesh Legislative Assembly
- Incumbent
- Assumed office March 2022
- Preceded by: Lakhan Singh
- Constituency: Dibiyapur

Personal details
- Born: 15 March 1957 (age 69) Etawah, Uttar Pradesh
- Party: Samajwadi Party
- Profession: Politician

Pradeep Kumar Yadav is an Indian politician, lawyer, and a member of the 18th Uttar Pradesh Assembly from the Dibiyapur Assembly constituency of the Auraiya district. He is a member of the Samajwadi Party.

== Early life ==
Pradeep Kumar Yadav was born on 15 March 1957 in Etawah, Uttar Pradesh, to a Hindu family of Captain Vishal Singh. He married Urmila Devi on 20 June 1978, and they had two children.

== See also ==
- Samajwadi Party
- 18th Uttar Pradesh Assembly
- Dibiyapur Assembly constituency
