= Kudarkot =

- town
- Location in Uttar Pradesh, India
- Coordinates: 26°49′N 79°24′E
- Country: India
- State: Uttar Pradesh
- District: Auraiya

Languages
  - Official: Hindi
- Time zone: UTC+5:30 (IST)
- PIN: 206122
- Vehicle registration: UP-
- Coastline: 0 kilometres (0 mi)

Kudarkot is a town in Auraiya district in the Indian state of Uttar Pradesh. Its postal code is 206122.
