= Auraiya Assembly constituency =

Vidhan Sabha constituency in Uttar Pradesh

Coordinates: 26.46°N 79.51°E

Auraiya
- Constituency No. 204 for the Uttar Pradesh Legislative Assembly

Constituency details
- Country: India
- Region: North India
- State: Uttar Pradesh
- District: Auraiya
- Total electors: 3,32,885
- Reservation: None

Member of Legislative Assembly
- 18th Uttar Pradesh Legislative Assembly
- Incumbent Gudiya Katheriya
- Party: Bharatiya Janta Party
- Elected year: 2022
- Preceded by: Ramesh Diwkar

Auraiya is a constituency of the Uttar Pradesh Legislative Assembly covering the city of Auraiya in the Auraiya district of Uttar Pradesh, India.

Auraiya is one of five assembly constituencies in the Etawah Lok Sabha constituency. Since 2008, this assembly constituency is numbered 204 amongst 403 constituencies.

In 2017, Bharatiya Janta Party candidate Ramesh Diwkar won in last Assembly election of 2017 Uttar Pradesh Legislative Elections defeating Bahujan Samaj Party candidate Bhimrao Ambedkar by a margin of 31,862 votes.

The current MLA of the assembly constituency is Gudiya Katheriya, who won 2022 Uttar Pradesh Legislative Assembly election from Bhartiya Janta Party.

== Members of the Legislative Assembly ==
Year	Member	Party
1957	Bhajan Lal	Independent politician
1957	Sukh Lal	Indian National Congress
1962	Badri Prasad	Indian National Congress
1967	Bharat Singh Chauhan	Samyukta Socialist Party
1969	Bharat Singh Chauhan	Bharatiya Kranti Dal
1974	Bharat Singh Chauhan	Bharatiya Kranti Dal
1977	Bharat Singh Chauhan	Janata Party
1980	Dhani Ram Verma	Janata Party (Secular)
1985	Kamlesh Kumar Pathak	Lok Dal
1989	Ravinder Singh Chauhan	Indian National Congress
1991	Indra Pal Singh	Janata Party
1993	Indra Pal Singh	Samajwadi Party
1996	Lal Singh Verma	Bharatiya Janata Party
2002	Ram Ji Shukla	Bahujan Samaj Party
2007	Shekhar	Bahujan Samaj Party
2012	Madan Singh	Samajwadi Party
2017	Ramesh Diwkar	Bharatiya Janata Party
2022	Gudiya Katheriya	Bharatiya Janata Party

== Election results ==
=== 2027 ===
2027 Uttar Pradesh Legislative Assembly election: Auraiya
Party	Candidate	Votes	%	±%
INDIA				
NDA				
BSP				
NOTA	None of the above			
Majority				
Turnout				
gain from		Swing		

=== 2022 ===
2022 Uttar Pradesh Legislative Assembly election: Auraiya
Party	Candidate	Votes	%	±%
BJP	Gudiya Katheriya	88,631	45.28	+0.06
SP	Jitendra Kumar Dohare	66,184	33.81	+12.6
BSP	Ravi Shastri Dohrey	36,159	18.47	−9.51
NOTA	None of the above	1,192	0.61	−0.04
Majority		22,447	11.47	−5.77
Turnout		195,746	58.8	+0.93
BJP hold		Swing		

=== 2017 ===
2017 Uttar Pradesh Legislative Assembly election: Auraiya
Party	Candidate	Votes	%	±%
BJP	Ramesh Diwkar	83,580	45.22	
BSP	Bhimrao Ambedkar	51,718	27.98	
SP	Madan Singh Gautam Alias Santosh	39,201	21.21	
NISHAD	Kanti	5,141	2.78	
NOTA	None of the above	1,191	0.65	
Majority		31,862	17.24	
Turnout		184,820	57.87	
