= Gudiya Katheriya =

Indian politician (born 1976)

Member of Uttar Pradesh Legislative Assembly
- Incumbent
- Assumed office March 2022
- Preceded by: Ramesh Diwkar
- Constituency: Auraiya

Personal details
- Born: 15 January 1976 (age 49); Kanpur, Uttar Pradesh
- Political party: Bharatiya Janata Party
- Parent: Ganga Ram Katheriya (father)
- Profession: Politician

Gudiya Katheriya, also known as Gudiya Devi, is an Indian politician and a member of the 18th Uttar Pradesh Assembly from the Auraiya Assembly constituency of the Auraiya district. She is a member of the Bharatiya Janata Party.

== Early life ==
Gudiya Katheriya was born on 1 January 1976 in Kanpur, Uttar Pradesh, to a Hindu family of Ganga Ram Katheriya. She married Mukesh Kumar in 1990, and they have two children.

== See also ==
- 18th Uttar Pradesh Assembly
- Auraiya Assembly constituency
- Uttar Pradesh Legislative Assembly
