= Muradganj =

Muradganj is a Town Area in Auraiya, Uttar Pradesh, India.

Muradganj is local town in Gram Panchayat JagatPur. It is a small town and located under in block or Tehsil- Ajitmal in district Auraiya. It is situated near by NH-2 approx 1 km. It has facilities such as a bank & ATM services, a post office, hospital and schools. The Yamuna River is close to muradganj by Ayana Road approx 7–8 km. It continues to grow quickly. There is good connectivity to the other districts such as bidhuna and Etawah District. The Etawah District is in west and on the east side is the Auraiya District. Achhalda, Bharthana, Etawah, Kanpur, Dibiapur are the nearby cities to Muradganj. The Indian Railway is near to Muradganj about 15 km in Achalda Town Side or 30 km from phaphund by Auraiya.

== Schools ==
Government School- zila panchayat inter college phaphund road muradganj Pt Rishi Maharaj College Ayana Road in Ayana

== Places ==
There are some places to traveling like Maa kalika Mandir Lakhana Wali, Devkali Mandir Auraiya, Panch Nadi in Jalon, Yamuna River are in the under Auraiya District.
