= Ramesh Diwkar =

Indian politician (died 2021)

Ramesh Diwakar

Member of Uttar Pradesh Legislative Assembly
- In office 2017–2021
- Succeeded by: Gudiya Katheriya
- Constituency: Auraiya

Personal details
- Political party: Bharatiya Janata Party
- Profession: Politician

Ramesh Diwakar (1964/1965 – April 22, 2021) was an Indian politician and Member of the Uttar Pradesh Legislative Assembly for Auraiya from 2017 till his death in 2021. Diwakar died from COVID-19 aged 56. He was the member of the Bhartiya Janta Party.

== See also ==
- 18th Uttar Pradesh Assembly
- Auraiya Assembly constituency
- Uttar Pradesh Legislative Assembly
