= Dalelnagar =

Dalelnagar is a town located in Auraiya district in the state of Uttar Pradesh, India. The global coordinates are 26°39' North and 79°37' East.

This village was established by a Pathan, namely Dalel Khan whose grave is also situated in this village.
