= Dibiyapur Assembly constituency =

Constituency of the Uttar Pradesh legislative assembly in India

Coordinates: 26.63°N 79.55°E

Dibiyapur
- Constituency No. 203 for the Uttar Pradesh Legislative Assembly

Constituency details
- Country: India
- Region: North India
- State: Uttar Pradesh
- District: Auraiya
- Total electors: 3,23,150
- Reservation: None

Member of Legislative Assembly
- 18th Uttar Pradesh Legislative Assembly
- Incumbent Pradeep Kumar Yadav
- Party: Samajwadi Party
- Elected year: 2022

Dibiyapur is a constituency of the Uttar Pradesh Legislative Assembly. It is one of five assembly constituencies in the Etawah Lok Sabha constituency and comprises parts of Auraiya and Bidhuna tehsils, in Auraiya district.

== Members of the Legislative Assembly ==
Election	Name	Party
2017	Lakhan Singh	Bharatiya Janata Party
2022	Pradeep Kumar Yadav	Samajwadi Party

== Election results ==
=== 2027 ===
2027 Uttar Pradesh Legislative Assembly election: Dibiyapur
Party	Candidate	Votes	%	±%
INDIA				
NDA				
BSP				
NOTA	None of the above			
Majority				
Turnout				
gain from		Swing		

=== 2022 ===
2022 Uttar Pradesh Legislative Assembly election: Dibiyapur
Party	Candidate	Votes	%	±%
SP	Pradeep Kumar Yadav	80,865	40.34	+9.35
BJP	Lakhan Singh	80,392	40.1	+2.8
BSP	Arun Kumar Dubey	31,500	15.71	−11.14
Jan Adhikar Party	Om Prakash Rajput	2,702	1.35	
NOTA	None of the above	928	0.46	+0.1
Majority		473	0.24	−6.07
Turnout		200,455	62.03	+0.12
SP gain from BJP		Swing		

2017 Uttar Pradesh Legislative Assembly election: Dibiyapur
Party	Candidate	Votes	%	±%
BJP	Lakhan Singh	71,480	37.3	
SP	Pradeep Kumar Yadav	59,386	30.99	
BSP	Ram Kumar Awasthi	51,452	26.85	
NISHAD	Vaadshah Rajput	2,761	1.44	
NOTA	None of the above	690	0.36	
Majority		12,094	6.31	
Turnout		191,614	61.91	
