= Babarpur Ajitmal =

- Town
- Location in Uttar Pradesh, India
- Coordinates: 26.34°N 79.19°E
- Country: India
- State: Uttar Pradesh
- District: Auraiya

Population
  - Total: 11,568

Languages
  - Official: Hindi
- Time zone: UTC+5:30 (IST)
- PIN: 206121
- Telephone code: 05683

Babarpur Ajitmal is a city with the status of "Nagar Panchayat" of district Auraiya, Uttar Pradesh, India.

== Demographics ==
As of 2001 India census, Babarpur Ajitmal had a population of 11568. Out of which, 6236 are males and 5332 are females. Children population is 1586. Babarpur Ajitmal has an average literacy rate of 72.84% out of which 78.5% males are literate and 66.22% females are literate.

== Chairperson ==
In the 2023 election, Smt. Asha Chak w/o Shri Akhilesh Chak became the chairperson of Nagar Panchayat Babarpur-Ajitmal, Auraiya.

== See also ==
- Muradganj
