= Kanpur division =

Administrative division of Uttar Pradesh, India

Coordinates: 26°28′12″N 80°19′48″E

- Location of Kanpur division in Uttar Pradesh
- Country: India
- State: Uttar Pradesh

Area
  - Total: 14,810 km^{2} (5,720 sq mi)

Population (2011)
  - Total: 12,873,369
  - Density: 869.2/km^{2} (2,251/sq mi)

Kanpur division is one of the 18 administrative geographical units (i.e. division) of the northern Indian state of Uttar Pradesh. Kanpur city is the administrative headquarters of the division. Kanpur was formerly spelled Cawnpore. The division consists of 6 districts:-

- Auraiya
- Etawah
- Farrukhabad
- Kanpur Dehat
- Kanpur Nagar
- Kannauj

== Literacy rates ==
Kanpur division is the most literate division in Uttar Pradesh with literacy rates of:-

- Auraiya - 78.95%
- Etawah - 78.41%
- Farrukhabad - 73.4%
- Kanpur Dehat - 75.78%
- Kanpur Nagar - 79.65%
- Kannauj - 72.70%

== History of administrative districts in Kanpur Division ==
Kanpur division was earlier part of the Allahabad division. In the year 2000, the Mayawati government did a major reshuffle of the Allahabad division, and a separate Kanpur division was created.

The Kanpur district itself was bifurcated into Kanpur Dehat and Kanpur Nagar. Kanpur Dehat was renamed as Ramabai Nagar, after Ramabai (1896-1935), the wife of Bhimrao Ramji Ambedkar. In 2012, the name was changed back to Kanpur Dehat (though the 2011 Indian census uses the name "Kanpur Dehat").

Rank	Urban Area	Area (km sq.)	2011 (Provisional figures)	Coverage
1	Kanpur	450	2,920,067	Includes Kanpur Cantonment and Chakeri
2	Farrukhabad	40	275,754	Includes Fatehgarh
3	Etawah	35	256,790	
4	Auraiya	25	64,598	
5	Kannauj	20	71,530	
6	Ghatampur	12	35,496	
7	Chhibramau	10	50,279	
8	Bharthana	10	38,781	

== Cities by GDP ==
- Kanpur
- Etawah
- Farrukhabad
- Auraiya

== Demographics ==
Kanpur division: mother-tongue of population, according to the 2011 Census.
Mother tongue code	Mother tongue	Districts						Kanpur division	
Mother tongue code	Mother tongue	Farrukhabad	Kannauj	Etawah	Auraiya	Kanpur Dehat	Kanpur Nagar	Total people	Percentage
002007	Bengali	466	198	151	337	1,069	14,341	16,562	0.13%
005018	Gujarati	11	13	54	104	6	576	764	0.01%
006102	Bhojpuri	701	736	27	26	16	5,008	6,514	0.05%
006240	Hindi	1,790,275	1,600,677	1,553,087	1,359,181	1,777,683	4,234,664	12,315,567	95.61%
006340	Kumauni	1	0	0	0	0	823	824	0.01%
006489	Rajasthani	116	25	39	85	18	747	1,030	0.01%
010008	Maithili	151	31	0	1	1	583	767	0.01%
011016	Malayalam	78	8	61	122	5	1,667	1,941	0.02%
013071	Marathi	39	16	55	77	7	4,024	4,218	0.03%
014011	Nepali	28	3	34	4	2	1,865	1,936	0.02%
015043	Odia	125	12	32	57	12	1,289	1,527	0.01%
016038	Punjabi	2,644	73	134	163	51	36,228	39,293	0.31%
017002	Sanskrit	0	2	4	3	0	932	941	0.01%
019014	Sindhi	140	4	212	14	0	6,603	6,973	0.05%
020027	Tamil	267	2	25	95	3	549	941	0.01%
021046	Telugu	24	22	6	134	0	709	895	0.01%
022015	Urdu	88,252	47,877	27,532	18,863	16,829	263,375	462,728	3.59%
040001	English	41	22	85	45	64	2,484	2,741	0.02%
–	Others	1,845	6,895	272	234	418	4,801	14,465	0.11%
Total		1,885,204	1,656,616	1,581,810	1,379,545	1,796,184	4,581,268	12,880,627	100.00%
