= Auraiya =

- City
- Location in Uttar Pradesh, India
- Coordinates: 26.47°N 79.52°E
- Country: India
- State: Uttar Pradesh
- District: Auraiya

Area
  - Total: 9 km^{2} (3.5 sq mi)
- Elevation: 137 m (449 ft)

Population (2011)
  - Total: 87,736
  - Density: 9,700/km^{2} (25,000/sq mi)

Languages
  - Official: Hindi
- Time zone: UTC+5:30 (IST)
- Postal code: 206122
- Vehicle registration: UP-79
- Website: www.auraiya.nic.in

Auraiya is a city and a municipal board in Auraiya district in the state of Uttar Pradesh, India, on National Highway 02. Before becoming the district headquarters it was the tehsil headquarters of Etawah district. The district is under Kanpur Mandal.

== History ==
On 17 September 1997, two tehsils named Auraiya and Bidhuna were separated from Etawah district to form the new Auraiya district.

== Geography ==
Boundaries and Area The district of Auraiya lies in the southwestern portion of Uttar Pradesh 26° 21" and 27° 01" north latitude and 78° 45" and 79° 45" east longitude and forms a part of the Kanpur Division. It is bounded on the north by the districts of Kannauj, on the west by tehsil Bharthana of the Etawah district and the district of Gwalior, on the west with the district of Kanpur Dehat, and on the south with Jalaun.

River System The rivers and streams of the Auraiya and Etawah districts jointly consist of the Yamuna its two large affluents, the Chambal and, the Kuwari; the Sengar, and its tributary Sirsa; The Rind or Arind and its tributaries the Ahenya, the Puraha and the Pandu.

== Demographics ==
As of 2011 India census, Auraiya had a population of 87,736. Males constitute 53% of the population and females 47%. Auraiya has an average literacy rate of 87.25%, higher than the national average of 74.37%; with 90.88% of the males and 83.23% of females literate. 12.16% of the population is under 6 years of age.
