= Sengar River =

River in Uttar Pradesh, India

Coordinates: 26°10′N 79°56′E

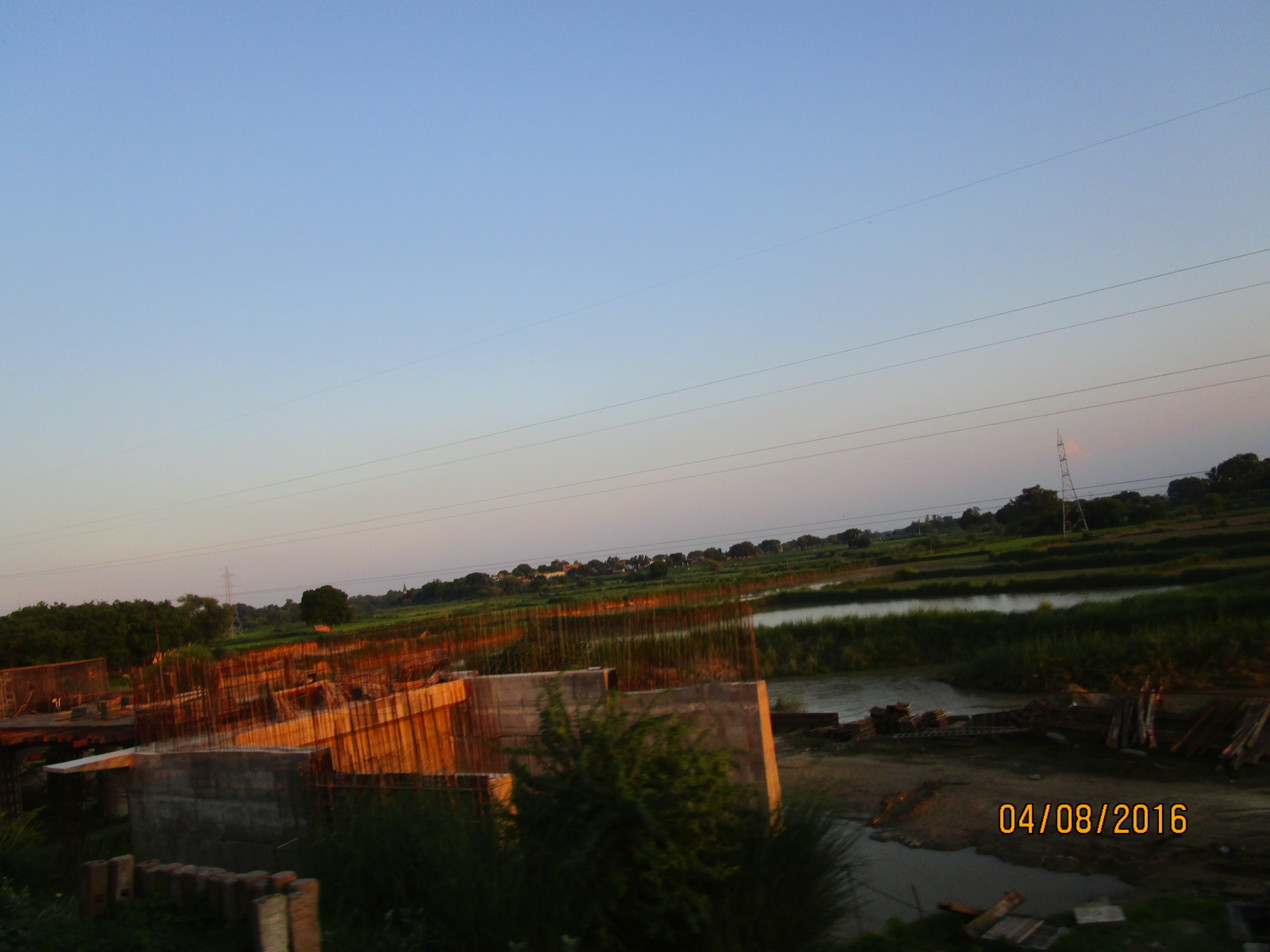
Sengar River

Sengar River is a tributary of the river Yamuna in the northern Indian state of Uttar Pradesh.

== Course ==
Sengar originates near Adhawan lake in Aligarh district and drains [Hathras District ]Etawah, Mainpuri and Kanpur districts before it confluences with the Yamuna between Kalpi and Hamirpur. It has a total length of 304 km (190 miles). The Sengar flows parallel to the Yamuna in Etawah district and is joined by the Sirsa river near Amritpur. It forms a doab with the Rind in Kanpur district. Much of the Sengar's basin in Etawah and Kanpur districts is under red loamy soil. The 1878 settlement report for Kanpur district also notes that the river is fringed by a series of ravines that had impacted adversely the fertility of the soil in the river's vicinity.

== Etymology ==
Sengar - originally called Basind - is said to have been named after the Sengar Rajputs after they captured most of Etawah following the fall of Kannauj in the medieval period.

== History ==
The foundation of this river was laid by King Vishok Dev Sengar also known as Bishukh Dev of Kanar (Morden Jagamanpur). Earlier this city (Auraiya) was ruled by the people of Mev caste. In Sambat 1158 (1101 AD), on Wednesday, Vishok Dev killed 20,000 Meos and established the kingdom there.

"There is a folk song related to the history of this river which shows its historicity. "

बहत वसींद नदी तहँ एका, नाम बदलि सेंगर नद टेका।
