= Auraiya district =

- District
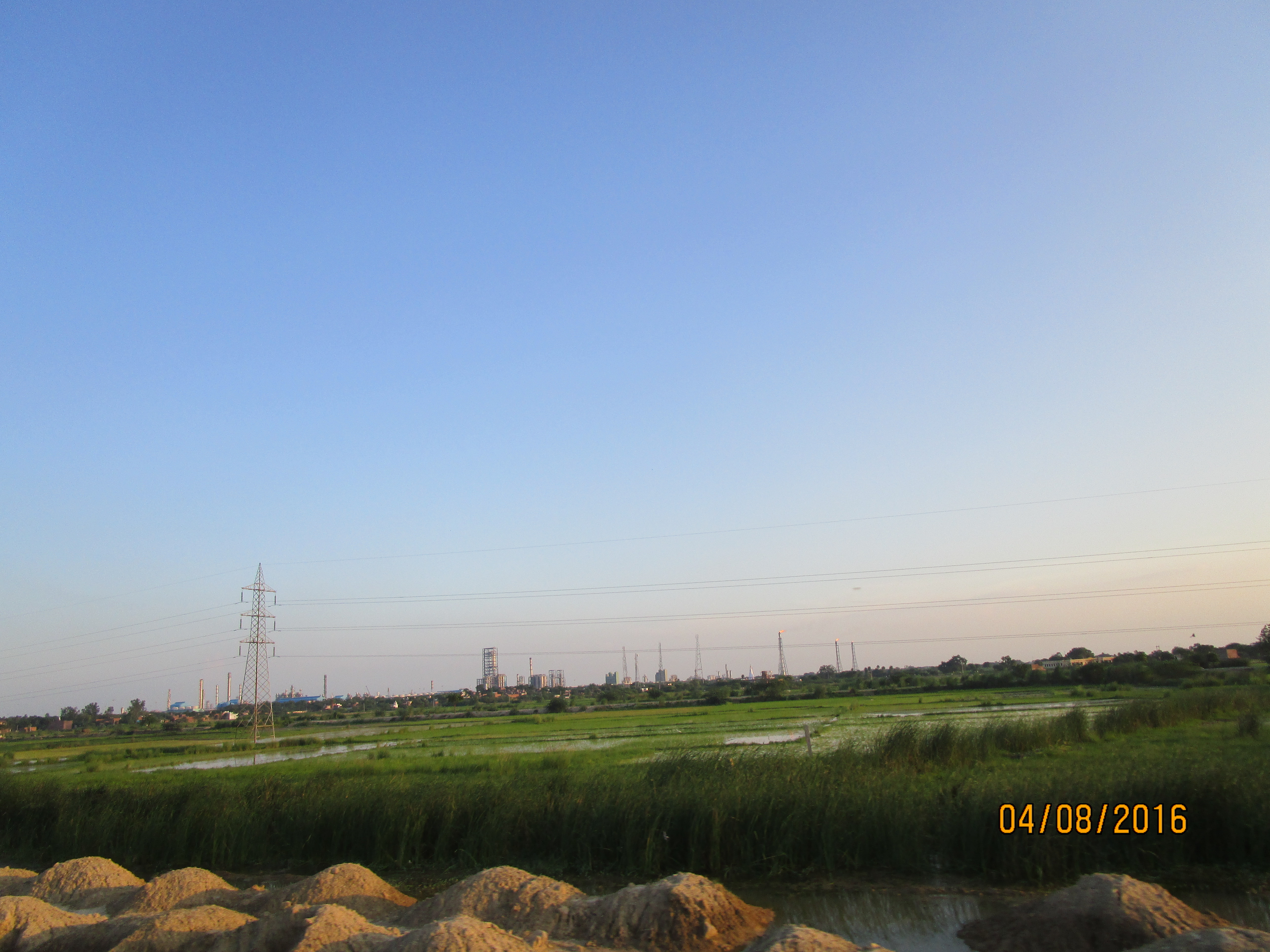
- Pata Water Reservoir near Phaphund

- Location of Auraiya district in Uttar Pradesh
- Country: India
- State: Uttar Pradesh
- Division: Kanpur
- Headquarters: Auraiya
- Tehsils: 3

Government
  - Lok Sabha constituencies: 1. Kannauj (Lok Sabha constituency)- Bidhuna; 2. Etawah (Lok Sabha constituency)- Auraiya, Dibiyapur
  - Vidhan Sabha constituencies: 1. Auraiya; 2. Bidhuna; 3. Dibiyapur

Area
  - Total: 2,054 km^{2} (793 sq mi)

Population (2011)
  - Total: 1,379,545
  - Density: 671.6/km^{2} (1,740/sq mi)
  - Urban: 234,205

Demographics
  - Literacy: 80.25%
  - Sex ratio: 864
- Time zone: UTC+05:30 (IST)
- Major highways: NH-19, Bundelkhand Expressway
- Average annual precipitation: 792 mm
- Website: auraiya.nic.in

Auraiya district is one of the districts of Uttar Pradesh state of India, and Auraiya town is the district headquarters. It lies on the south-western portion of Uttar Pradesh and also forms a part of the Kanpur Division.

== History ==
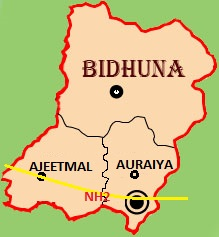
Tehsils of Auraiya District

=== Ancient period ===
Auraiya district generally shares the same history as the broader middle Doab. The region was first ruled by the Panchalas during the Mahajanapada era. The Mahabharata says that Ajamida, the 5th successor of Bharata, had three sons, one of which Brihadvasu, was sent to rule Dakshina Panchala, which included the region south of the Ganga, with capital at Kampilya. During the time of the epic of the Mahabharata, Dakshina Panchala kingdom was ruled by Drupada during the Mahabharata period, with his famous daughter Draupadi being born in the region. Panchala is listed as one of the 16 Mahajanapadas during the time of Buddha, with the town of Alavi, identified with Airwa of this district, as an important settlement. Buddha and Mahavira are both said to have visited this town. Panchala fell under the rule of the Nandas, Mauryas, Shungas and Kanvas, but also had significant autonomy. After the fall of the Kanvas, the history of the region is obscure, mostly likely ruled by the Mitras who were made subordinates of the Kushanas. After the fall of the Kushanas, the Nagas took over. During Gupta rule, the district prospered and the cities of Kudarkot and Alavi in this district were prominent centres of learning. Faxian, who visited Panchala, stayed in a monastic retreat near Alavi. The district fell under Huna rule after the Guptas collapsed, but eventually fell under the rule of the imperial dynasties of Kannauj, which it would remain under until the Muslim conquest. During the rule of Harsha, Xuanzang recorded the district as being part of the wild country beyond Alavi. The last ruler of Kannauj, Jayachandra, was defeated by Muhammad Ghori in 1194 and Auraiya fell under Muslim rule.

=== Medieval period ===
Although Delhi nominally controlled the middle Doab, most of the region of Panchala was in fact dominated by numerous Rajput clans who observed only nominal submission to the Sultan. The Sengars took parts of Bidhuna and Auraiya, while the Gaurs took the eastern part of Bidhuna before falling to the Chandelas of Mahoba. The Sultans had to continually march into the region to suppress local uprisings for autonomy, such as Firuz Shah Tughlaq in 1377 suppressing a rebellion by Sumer Rai, a prominent Zamindar in this district. In 1392, three Zamindars: Rai Nar Singh, Bri Bahan and Sumer Shah, led an uprising against the Sultan Nasiruddin Muhammad Shah, until everyone but Sumer Shah was murdered under the pretense of a peace deal. The Sultan then sent Malik Sarwar, a eunuch, to restore order. He was given the territory between Kannauj and Bihar for his own, marking the foundation of the Jaunpur Sultanate.

For the next century, the region lay in the contested area between the spheres of influence of Delhi and Jaunpur, and was a major battleground, while also witnessing numerous rebellions from the local Rajput chiefs and nearby feudal lords. Control from the centre was very weak up until the First Battle of Panipat when the Delhi Sultanate finally fell to the Mughals. At the time the region was under the control of nobleman Qutub Khan, who surrendered after the Mughal armies came into the Doab after the Battle of Khanwa. From 1540 to 1556, the region fell under Suri rule again, until the Second Battle of Panipat put it under Mughal rule again. During Akbar's time, the district was divided between several mahals of the Sarkar of Kannauj: Sakatpur, Sahar, Phaphund and Patti Nakhat. The region remained relatively undisturbed until after the death of Aurangzeb.

=== Early modern period ===
In 1714, Farrukhasiyar granted to Afghan noble Muhammad Khan Bangash the middle Doab as fiefdom. After his death in 1743, Qaim Khan, his son, was sent to a disastrous battle in Rohilkhand by Safdar Jung, Nawab of Awadh, and was killed. Safdar Jung then tried to seize the Bangash territory using his deputy Nawal Rai, who was installed as Maharaja Bahadur. However, Nawal Rai's policies led to an Afghan rebellion and his death in battle with Ahmad Khan Bangash. Hearing of Nawal Rai's death Safdar Jung, along with the Marathas and the Jats of Bharatpur, crushed Ahmad Khan's army in battle. As a reward most of the present district was handed to the Marathas. In 1757, during a conflict between the Mughals and Awadh, Ahmad Khan Bangash used Mughal armies to retake Etawah from the Marathas, bringing it back under Mughal authority. However after Shuja ud Daula threatened his capital, he abandoned retaking the region of Etawah allowing the Marathas to reoccupy it.

Under the Rohillas In 1760 AD Ahmad Shah Durrani invaded India; he was opposed in 1761 by the Marathas on the field of Panipat and inflicted on them a signal defeat. Among other Maratha chieftains Govind Rao Pandit lost his life in the action. Before his departure from India the Durrani chief consigned large tracts of country to the Rohilla chieftains, and while Dhunde Khan received Shikohabad, Inayat Khan, son of Hafiz Rahmat Khan received the district of Etawah. This was then in the possession of the Marathas, and accordingly in 1762 a Rohilla force was sent under Mullah Mohsin Khan to wrest the assigned property from the Marathas. This force was opposed near the town of Etawah by Kishan Rao and Bala Rao Pandits, who were defeated and compelled to seek safety in flight across the Yamuna. Siege was then laid to the fort of Etawah by Mohsin Khan; but the fort was soon surrendered by its commander, and the district fell into the hands of the Rohillas.

The occupation, however, was merely nominal at first; the zamindars refused to pay revenue to Inayat Khan and, secure in their mud forts set his authority at defiance. Strong reinforcements were sent to the Rohillas, including some artillery, under Sheikh Kuber and Mullah Baz Khan, and many of the smaller forts were levelled to the grounds; but in their ravine fortresses the zamindars of Kamait in the trans-Yamuna tract still resisted the authority of Inayat Khan. Hafiz Rahmat and Inayat Khan then came in person to Etawah and operations were vigorously pressed against the refractory zamindars. Ultimately an annual tribute was agreed to by the latter. Hafiz Rahmat then departed to Bareilly, and Rohilla garrisons were established at convenient places in the district. Meanwhile, a new minister arose at Delhi called Najib Khan, better known as Najib-ud-daula, Amir-ul-umra, Shuja-ud-daula succeeded Safdar Jang as Nawab Wazir and occupied most of the Bangash possessions as far as Aligarh, with the exception of those granted by the Durrani to the Rohillas after he battle of Pandit. But the wazir's hostility to the Farrukhabad Afghans had not abated one jot, and in 1762 he persuaded Najib-ud-daula to join him in an attack on Farrukhabad. The attack was beaten off by the aid of Hafiz Rahmat Khan and matters once more settled down peacefully.

In 1766 the Marathas under Mulhar Rao, who had been awaiting their opportunity, once more crossed the Yamuna and attacked Phaphund, where a Rohilla force under Muhammad Hasan Khan eldest son of Mohsin Khan, was posted. On receipt of this news Hafiz Rahmat advanced from Bareilly to oppose the Marathas. He was joined near Phaphund by Sheikh Kuber, the Rohilla governor of Etawah, and prepared to give battle; but Mulhar Rao refused to risk an engagement and once more retired across the Yamuna. The ambitions Najib-ud-daula had been considerably irritated by the intervention of the Rohillas on behalf of Ahmad Khan Bangladesh in 1762; and though he had been too busily engaged otherwise to pursue his plans of revenge before, he began in 1770 to plot the downfall of Hafiz Rahmat Khan.

Accordingly, a Maratha army was invited to Delhi for the purpose of first wresting Farrukhabad from Ahmad Khan and of afterwards invading Rohillakhand. The united forces of Najib-ud-daula and the Marathas advanced from Delhi; but at Koil Najib-ud-daula fell ill and retraced his steps, leaving his eldest son, Zabita Khan to operate with the Marathas. Zabita Khan however, was by no means disposed to fight against his brother Afghans. The Marathas, knowing this, kept him practically a prisoner in their camp and he requested Hafiz Rahmat Khan to obtain his release. Hafiz Rahmat Khan accordingly opened negotiations with the Marathas for the release of Zabita Khan; but the Maratha leaders demanded as their price the surrender of the jagirs of Etawah and Shikohabad. Hafiz Rahmat Khan was not disposed to agree to those terms, and while negotiations were proceeding for buying off the Marathas Zabita Khan escaped. Several desultory engagements now took place between the Marathas and the Afghan forces. Inayat khan was summoned by his father to Farrukhabad in order that he might be consulted regarding the surrendering of his jagirs. But although Dhunde Khan agreed to give up Shikohabad Inayat Khan refused to surrender Etawah.

Ultimately, disgusted with his father's arrangements he returned to Bareilly, and his father on his own responsibility sent orders to Sheikh Kuber, the Rohilla governor of Etawah, to surrender the fort to the Marathas. The Marathas now marched to Etawah, but as the orders had not yet reached him Sheikh Kuber gave them battle. Several desperate assaults were made on the fort of Etawah which were all beaten off, but finally it was handed over to the Marathas in accordance with hafiz Rahmat Khan's orders, and the Rohillas quit the district, leaving it once more in the hands of the Marathas. Later in the same year, 1771 AD, the Marathas advanced to Delhi and reinstated the emperor Shah Alam, who had cast in his lot with them, on the throne. They were now masters of the empire and Zabita Khan determined to oppose them. Assembling his forces, he attacked the Marathas near Delhi but was signally defeated, and in 1772 the Marathas overran a large portion of Rohilkhand and captured Najafgarh, where Zabita Khan's family resided and his treasure lay.

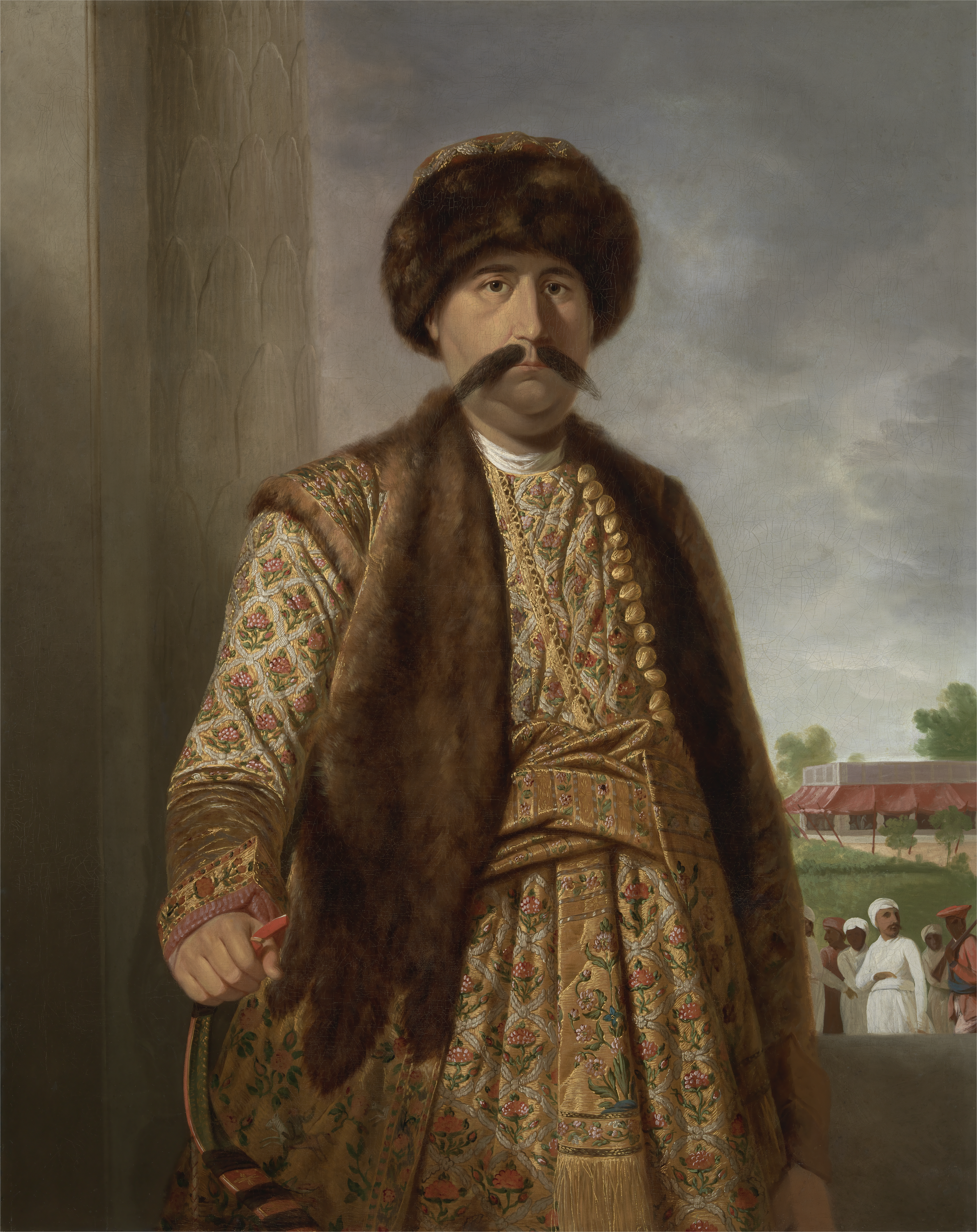
Shuja-ud-daula, Nawab of Oudh

Under the Government of Oudh Zabita Khan then solicited the aid of Shuja-ud-daula, Nawab Wazir of Oudh; but the Nawab declined to interfere unless Hafiz Rahmat Khan applied on his behalf. Negotiations were commenced with Shah Alam and the Marathas for the restoration of Zabita Khan's family and the evacuation of Rohilkhand. The Marathas agreed to accept 40 lakhs of rupees, provided that Shuja-ud-daula made himself responsible for the payment; but Shuja-ud-daula now declined to enter into any such engagement unless Hafiz Rahmat Khan gave him a bond for the money. To this Hafiz Rahmat Khan consented, the bond was signed and the Marathas retired from Rohilkhand. In 1773 AD the Marathas proposed to attack Shuja-ud-daula and attempted to gain the help of Hifaz Rahmat Khan. The latter refused to him them. Instead he sent information to Shuja-ud-daula concerning what he had done, and on the strength of this requested restoration of his bond. Shuja-ud-daula expressed his approval of Hafiz Rahmat Khan's conduct and promised the restitution of the bond when the Marathas as had been defeated. The Marathas were defeated soon after at Asadpur by the combined forces of Shuja-ud-daula and Hafiz Rahmat Khan, with the result that they quit not only Rohilkhand but Delhi also.

Shuja-ud-daula then returned to Oudh, but denied ever having promised to restore the bond. He next seduced many of the Afghan Rohillas from their allegiance to Hafiz Rahmat Khan, and then proceeded to eject the Maratha garrisons from Etawah and Shikohabad in spite of Rahmat Khan's remonstrance. He ever went further and called on Hafiz Rahmat Khan to discharge the balance of 35 lakhs due on the bond. This was only a pretext for provoking hostilities for which purpose the Nawab had already begun to assemble an army; and Hafiz Rahmat Khan having failed to pay up, the Nawab advanced to the Ganges. The last scene in the tangled history of the period closed with the defeat of Hafiz Rahmat Khan by Shuja-ud-daula who was aided by a British force, at the battle of Miranpur Katra in the Shahjahanpur district on 23 April 1774 AD Etawah under the Oudh Government.

From 1774 to 1801 the district of Etawah remained under the government of Oudh. Little occurred to disturb it during this period and little is known regarding its history. For many years the administration of the district was in the hands of Mian Almas Ali Khan. Ails were stationed, we know, at Etawah, Kudarkot and Phaphund. One of those who held office at the last named placed was Raja Bhagmal or Baramal. The latter was by Caste a Jat and was sister's son to Almas Ali Khan, who was by birth a Hindu but was subsequently made a eunuch and converted to Islam. Raja Bhagmal built the fort at Phaphund and the old mosque which still bears an inscription recording thenamed of donor. Almas Ali Khan was, recording to Colonie Sleeman,"the greatest and best man" Oudh ever produced; be amassed great wealth, but having no descendant, he spent his money for the benefit of the people committed to his charge. He held court occasionally at Kudarkot where he built a fort, of which the massive ruins still remain. At Etawah the amils are said to have resided in the fort; but the building was destroyed by Shuja-ud-daula in consequence of the representations of the Etawah townspeople that, so long as the amils occupied such an impregnable residence, they would never do anything but oppress the people.

=== British period ===
In 1801, the Nawab of Awadh ceded the region to the British, who faced opposition from the many Zamindars. In 1837, the district was wracked with a famine.

The district was involved in the Rebellion of 1857. Sepoys from Jhansi crossed the Yamuna and briefly liberated Auraiya, capturing the tehsildar and burning some bungalows. In August, the Zamindars began to quarrel over who received what part of the revenues of Etawah district, so the British drew up a new revenue sharing agreement. Those dissatisfied with the arrangement, such as Rup Singh in Auraiya, defied the pro-British Kunwar Zohar Singh and collected revenue for themselves. In December, Rup Singh of Bhareh invited anti-British sepoys to Auraiya, and the Raja of Ruru and Rana Mahendra Singh crushed Zohar Singh's forces, leading to a general throwing off of the british yoke throughout the district. In later December the British recovered Etawah but could not retake Auraiya due to the defence of Rup Singh. In March 1858, a major battle broke out for control of Ajeetmal near Auraiya where many villages were burnt. The region was still held by freedom fighters, who held the region until the British recovered it in October 1857, when the last rebels were chased out.

The district was involved with the freedom struggle, with freedom fighters like Gendalal Dixit, a schoolteacher at Auraiya who formed the Shivaji Samiti to free the country through revolution. He persuaded a dacoit named Brahmachari to join the rebellion, but was soon betrayed and arrested. In 1929, Gandhi visited Auraiya. The police killed six people in Auraiya during the 1942 Quit India movement.

On 17 September 1997 two tehsils named Auraiya and Bidhuna were separated from district Etawah to form the new district named as Auraiya. It is situated on National Highway 19 (Mughal Road) and 64 km in the east of district headquarters of Etawah and 105 km in west of Kanpur.

== Geography ==
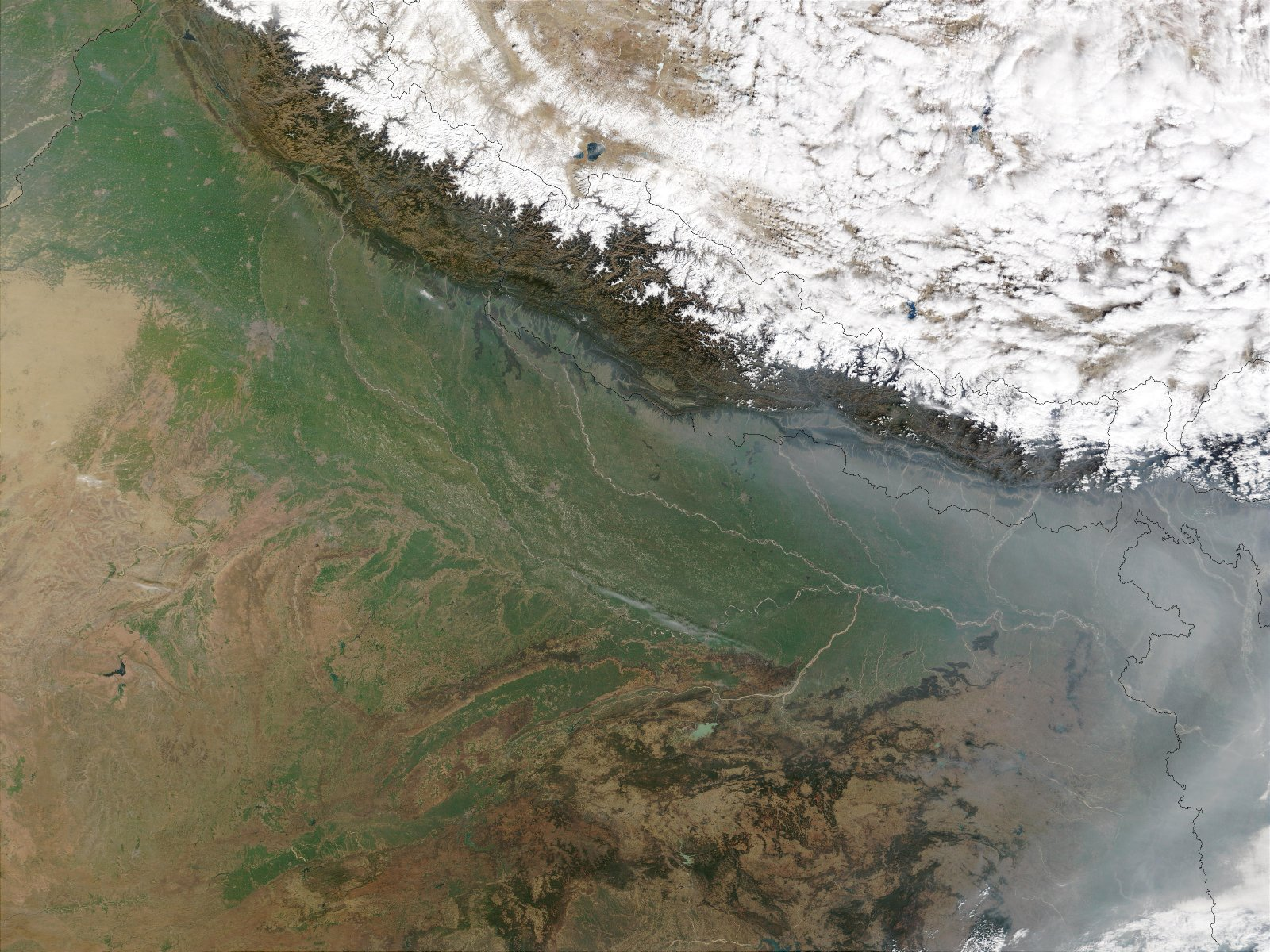
Indo-Gangetic Plain

The district of Auraiya lies in the south-western portion of Uttar Pradesh 26.4667°N 79.5167°E and also forms a part of the Kanpur Division. It borders the districts of Kannauj on the north, Etawah on the west, Ramabai Nagar district on the east, and Jalaun to the south. It has an average elevation of 133 metres (436 feet).

The Auraiya District covers an area of 2,054 km^{2} (793 sq mi), of which more than one-third is designated rural. The main rivers which flows through the district are Yamuna and Sengar. The total length of the Yamuna in the district is about 112 km. Auraiya lies entirely in the Indo-Gangetic Plain, but its physical features vary considerably and are determined by the rivers which cross it.

=== Climate ===
The District features an atypical version of the humid subtropical climate. Summers are long and the weather is extremely hot from early April to mid-October, with the monsoon season in between. The average annual rainfall in the district is 792 mm. About 85% of the annual normal rainfall in the district is received during the south west monsoon months from June to September, August being the rainiest month. The brief, mild winter starts in late November, peaks in January and heavy fog often occurs.

Temperatures in the district range from 3 to 46 °C, with May being the hottest and January being the coolest month. During the rainy season the relative humidity is generally high being over 70%. Thereafter the humidity decreases and by summer which is the driest part of the year the relative humidity in the afternoons become less than 30%.

=== Cultivable Land ===
The area of cultivable land in the district in 1990-91 was 141624 hectares. According to the 1990-91 agricultural survey, the total number of active cultivable lands remained to be 151838. Most of the cultivables are small. The count of cultivables less than 0.5 hectares remained to be 47.65%, and between 0.5 & 1.0 hectares the cultivables remained to be 23.76%, and 1.0 to 2.0, it were 17.33%, and 2.0 to 4.0 hectare cultivable land's percentage was 8.54%, and more than 4.0 it were 2.72%.

== Civic Administration ==
As of 2012, Auraiya district comprises 2 tehsils (Auraiya and Bidhuna), 2 census towns, 7 statutory towns (Ajitmal, Bhagyanagar, Sahar, Bidhuna, Achalda, Erwakatra and Auraiya) and 841 villages. It also has its own Nagar Palika Parishad. In 2014 a new tehsil ajitmal comes in existence.

Smt. Neha Prakash, IAS is the current District Magistrate. Kamal singh dohare is M.L.C., Gudiya Katheriya is current M.L.A.

=== Villages ===
- Dalelnagar
- Niranjanapur Dibiyapur
- Umrain
- Sainpur

== Politics ==
Auraiya district has three Vidhan Sabha constituencies: Auraiya, Bidhuna and Dibiyapur. Auraiya and Dibiyapur assembly seats come under Etawah (SC) Lok Sabha constituency and Bidhuna comes under Kannauj. The district is part of the Middle Doab where Yadav influence is high, therefore although Uttar Pradesh is a dominantly BJP-supporting state, Auraiya district often elects members of the Samajwadi Party. The current members are:

- Bidhuna - Rekha Verma (SP)
- Dibiyapur - Pradeep Kumar Yadav (SP)
- Auraiya - Gudiya Katheriya (BJP)

== Economy ==
Auraiya district is one of the backward districts in industrial sector declared by the government of Uttar Pradesh state. Only the two town areas, Dibiyapur and Auraiya, are equipped with main industries.

=== Small Scale Industries ===
The Rice-mills and Dal-mills are working well there in Dibiyapur and Auraiya. Other than these mills some steel furniture and cement products small scale industries are there in Auraiya district located at different places. The raw material for these small scale industries is imported from Agra and Kanpur. Mainly, the rice, pulses and desi ghee is transported at large scale to the other districts and states. In the Auraiya city itself the wooden furniture work is on large scale and due to its cost and quality factor, the furniture has made a good place in the market of nearby districts.

Dibiyapur is notable industrial town of this district which has installations of India's leading Public Sector Enterprises viz. 663 MW Combined cycle power plant of NTPC, Petrochemical plant and Gas compressor station of GAIL. The Uttar Pradesh Petrochemical Complex (UPPC) of Gas Authority of India Limited is located at Pata, District. Auraiya, U.P. It was set up in accordance with GAIL's mission to maximise the value addition from each fraction of Natural Gas.

== Transport ==
Phaphund (Dibiyapur) Railway Station

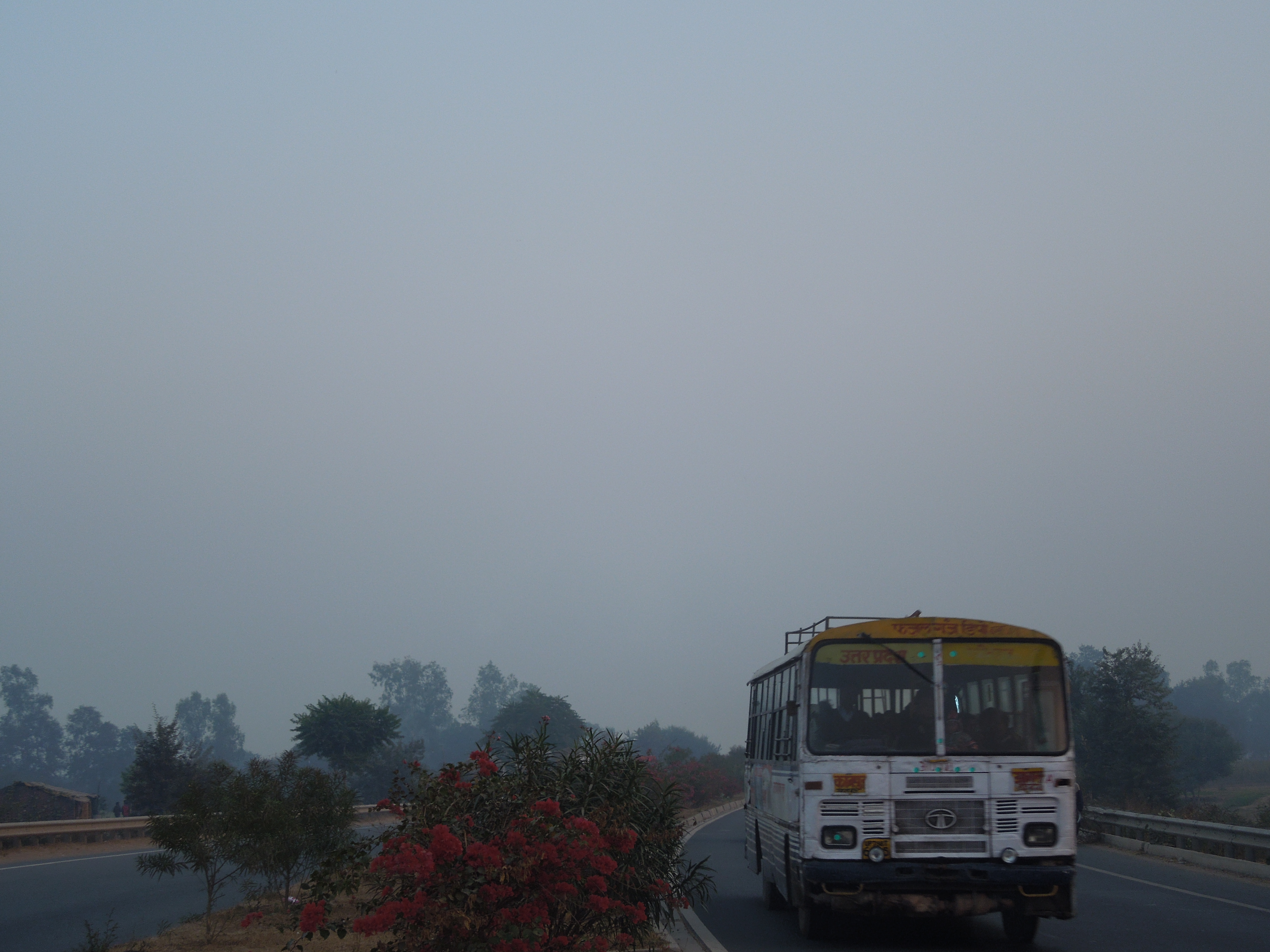
NH-19

=== Rail ===
District has 8 Railway Station/Halt. The district is well served by its "A" graded Phaphund (Dibiyapur) railway station. Length of Railway Line in the district is 33 km and it comes under North Central Railway zone.

=== Road ===
Towns and villages are well equipped with a web of roads as it is the major way of transportation in the region. National Highway 19 (Mughal Road) pass from the southern part of the district. District's headquarters Auraiya is at 64 km distance from Etawah and 105 km from Kanpur. Auraiya Bus Station is situated on National Highway 19. Uttar Pradesh State Road Transport Corporation operates buses to all cities in Uttar Pradesh. Regular buses ply from Auraiya to Kannauj, Kanpur, Agra, Allahabad and Faizabad.

== Demographics ==
Historical population
| Year | Pop. | ±% p.a. |
|---|---|---|
| 1901 | 365,919 | — |
| 1911 | 344,748 | −0.59% |
| 1921 | 332,689 | −0.36% |
| 1931 | 338,346 | +0.17% |
| 1941 | 400,599 | +1.70% |
| 1951 | 440,253 | +0.95% |
| 1961 | 543,555 | +2.13% |
| 1971 | 669,181 | +2.10% |
| 1981 | 808,222 | +1.91% |
| 1991 | 1,000,035 | +2.15% |
| 2001 | 1,179,993 | +1.67% |
| 2011 | 1,379,545 | +1.57% |

According to the 2011 census Auraiya district has a population of 1,379,545, roughly equal to the nation of Eswatini or the US state of Hawaii. This gives it a ranking of 357th in India (out of a total of 640). The district has a population density of 681 inhabitants per square kilometre (1,760/sq mi) . Its population growth rate over the decade 2001-2011 was 16.3%. Auraiya has a sex ratio of 864 females for every 1000 males, and a literacy rate of 80.25%. 16.98% of the population lives in urban areas. Scheduled Castes made up 28.39% of the population.

Auraiya ranks 3rd in Literacy rate ranking of All U.P. districts ranking as per 2011 census

Religions in Auraiya district (2011)
| Religion | Percent |
| Hinduism | 92.32% |
| Islam | 7.39% |
| Other or not stated | 0.29% |
Distribution of religions

In 1991, Hindus percentage was 92.79% against the state average of 83.76% and 6.63% of Muslims as compared to the state average of 15.48%. The remaining 0.58% of the district population was Sikhs, Christians, Jains and Buddhists. In 2011, Auraiya district had 92% Hindus and 7% Muslims, with Hindus being more concentrated in rural areas.

Languages of Auraiya district (2011)
1. Hindi (98.5%)
2. Urdu (1.37%)
3. Others (0.11%)

At the time of the 2011 Census of India, 98.52% of the population in the district spoke Hindi (or a related language) and 1.37% Urdu as their first language. The local dialect is sometimes called Pachharua or Antarvedi.

== Culture ==
=== Dance & Music ===
Popular varieties of folk music prevalent throughout western U.P. e.g. the Allaha, Phaag, Kajari and Rasiyas, etc. are popular in this district as well, and are sung at different times of the year. Folk songs known as Dhola, Unchari and Langadia are also very common in the villages. Bhajans, Kirtan in a chorus to the accomplishment of musical instruments is very much liked by the inhabitants of the district.

A number of open air performances, combining the rural style of folk music and dancing with a central theme are a regular feature of rural life in the district. The dance named Banjasha is one of the most popular folk dances of villagers of the district. Nautankis and dramas based on mythology are often staged and attract large gatherings, particularly in the villages.

=== Festivals and Fairs ===
Diwali and Rama Navami are popular festivals in the District. Other festivals are Vijayadashami, Makar Sankranti, Vasant Panchami, Ayudha Puja, Ganga Mahotsava, Janmashtami, Maha Shivaratri, Hanuman Jayanti and Eid.

=== Cuisine ===
A typical day-to-day traditional vegetarian meal of the district, like any other North Indian thali, consists of roti (flatbread), chawal, dal, sabji, raita and papad. Many people still drink the traditional drink chaach with meals. On festive occasions, usually 'tava' (flat pan for roti) is considered inauspicious, and instead fried foods are consumed. A typical festive thali consists of puri, kachori, sabji, pulav, papad, raita, salad and desserts (such as sewai or kheer).
Wheat constitutes the staple food of the people, other materials commonly consumed here as food being maize, barley, gram and jowar. Chapatis prepared from kneaded wheat or corn flour are generally eaten with dal or gur and milk. The pulses consumed here are urd, arhar, moong, chana, masur etc.
Sweets occupy an important place in the diet and are eaten at social ceremonies. People make distinctive sweetmeats from milk products, including khurchan, peda, gulabjamun, petha, Imarti, makkhan malai, and cham cham. The samosa, gol-gappa, chaat and Paan is consumed across the whole district for its flavour and ingredients.

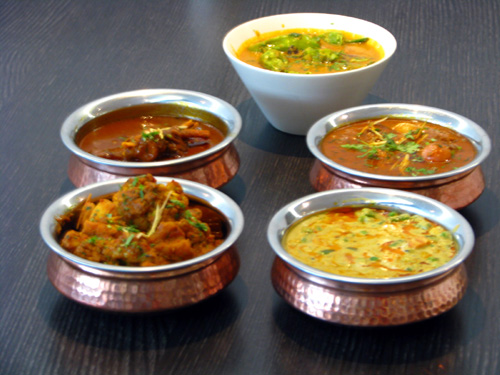
Different varieties of sabji

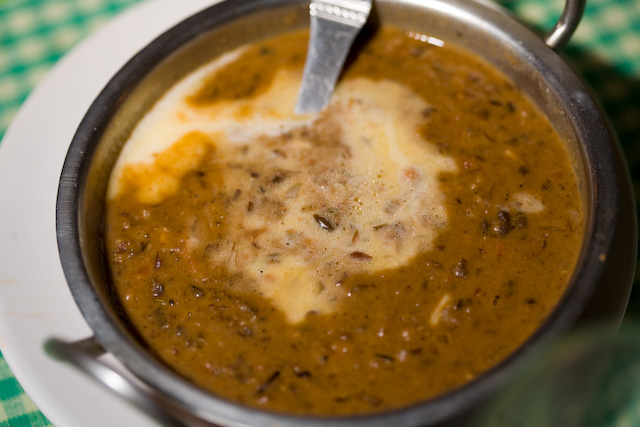
Dal Makhani, popular meal

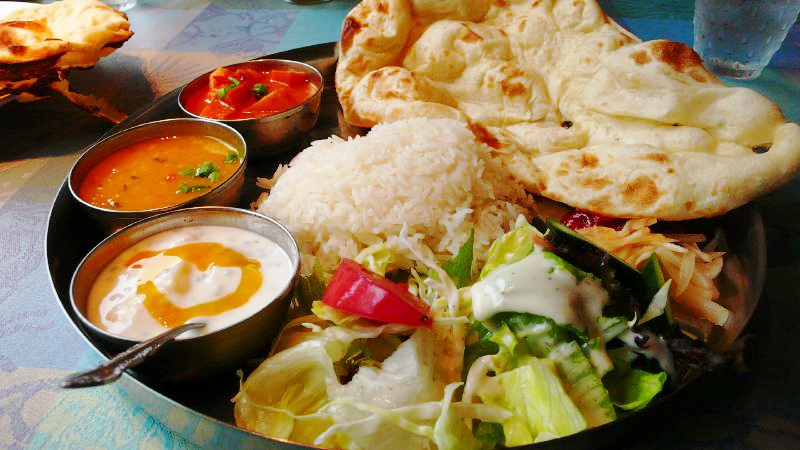
North Indian Thali

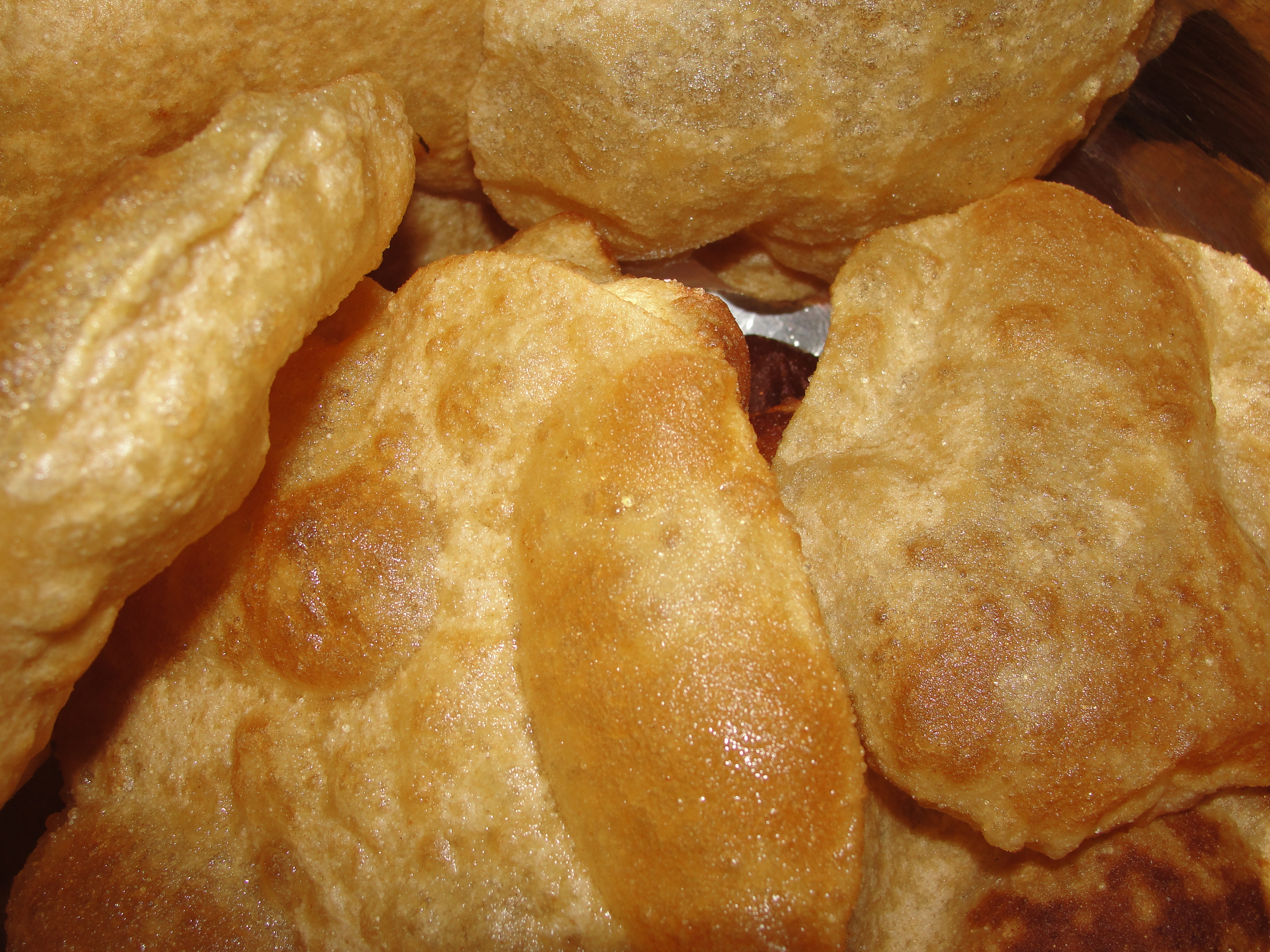
Puri on festivals

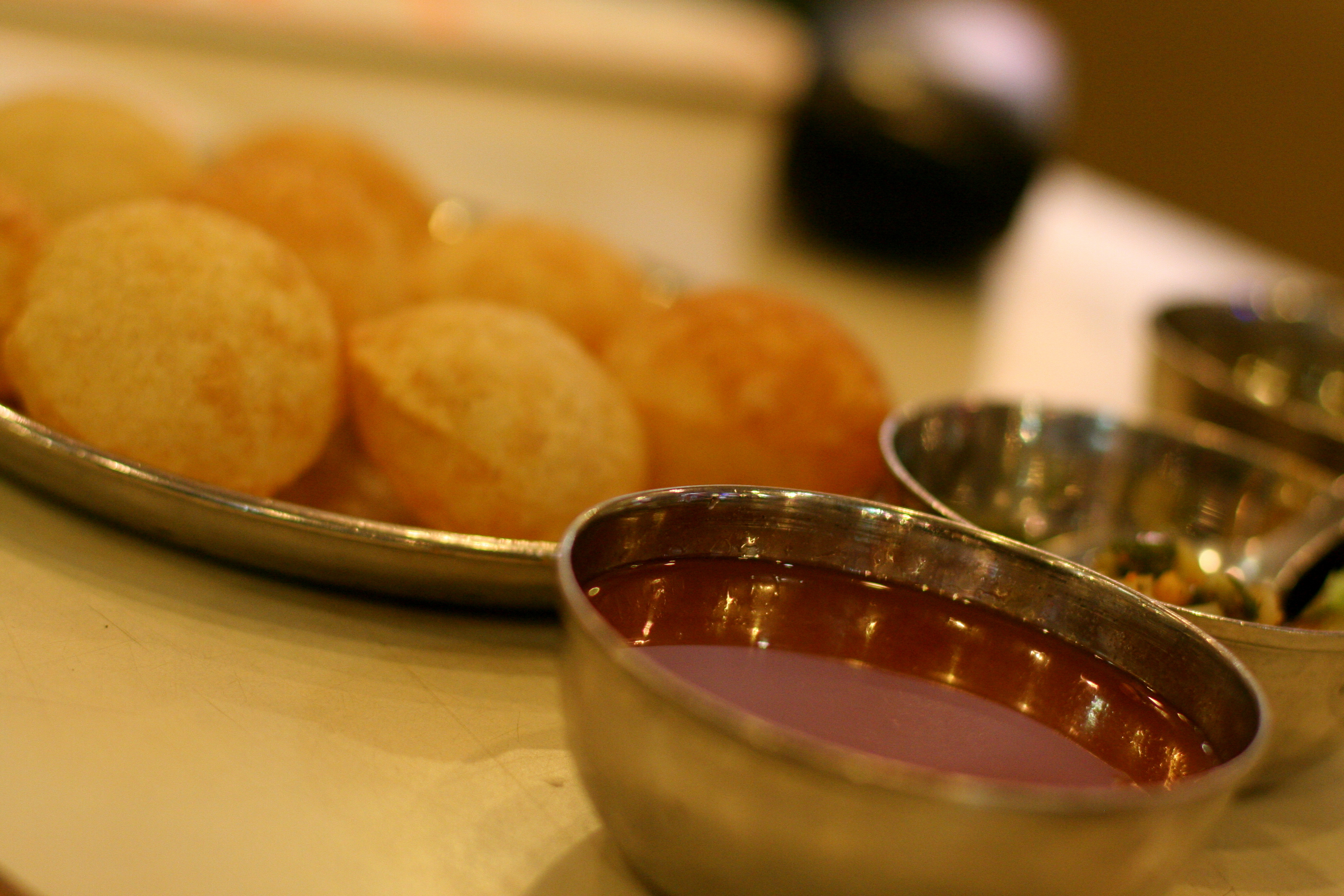
Gol-Gappa

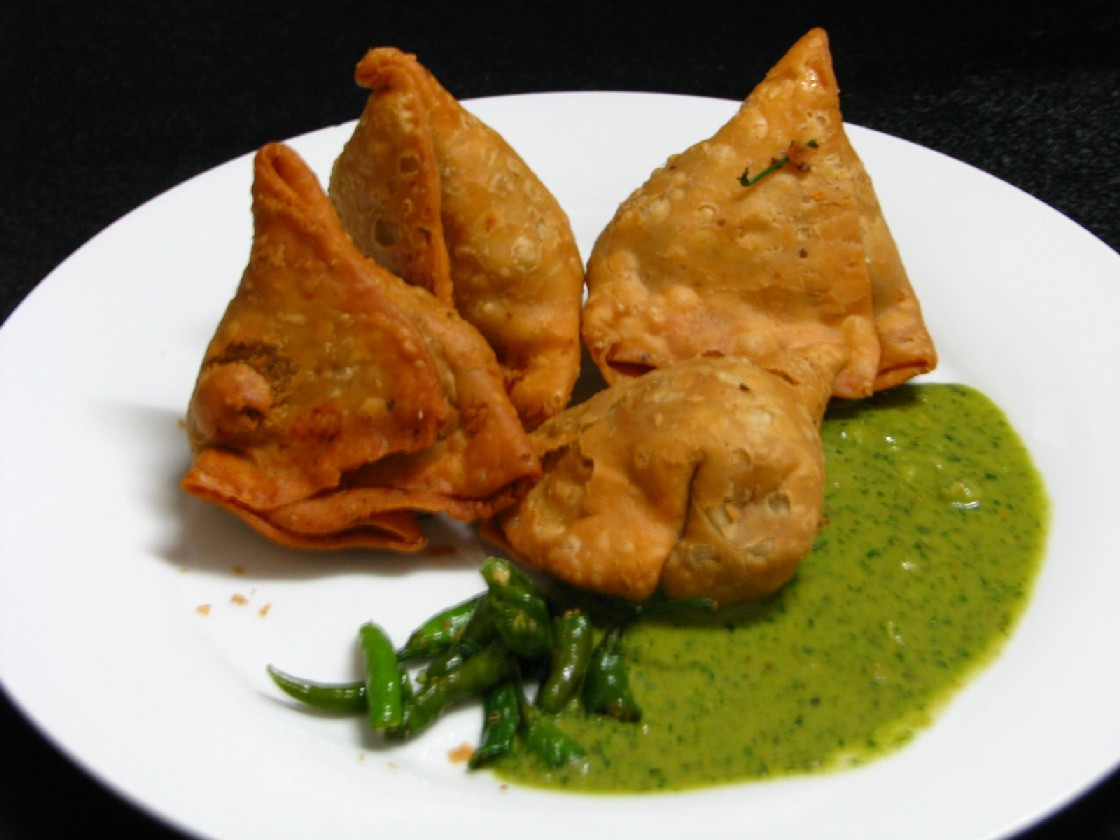
Samosa with chutney

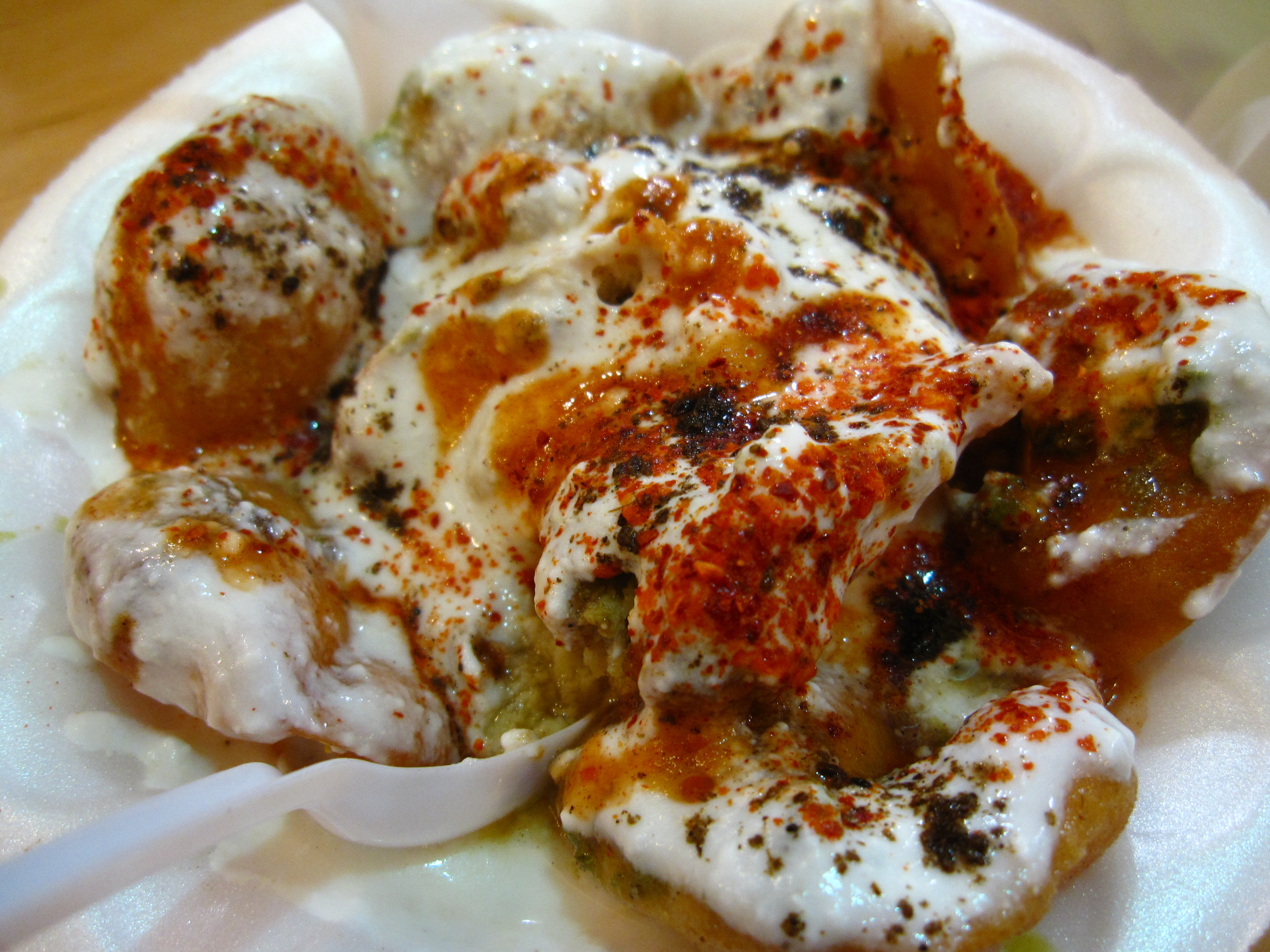
Chaat

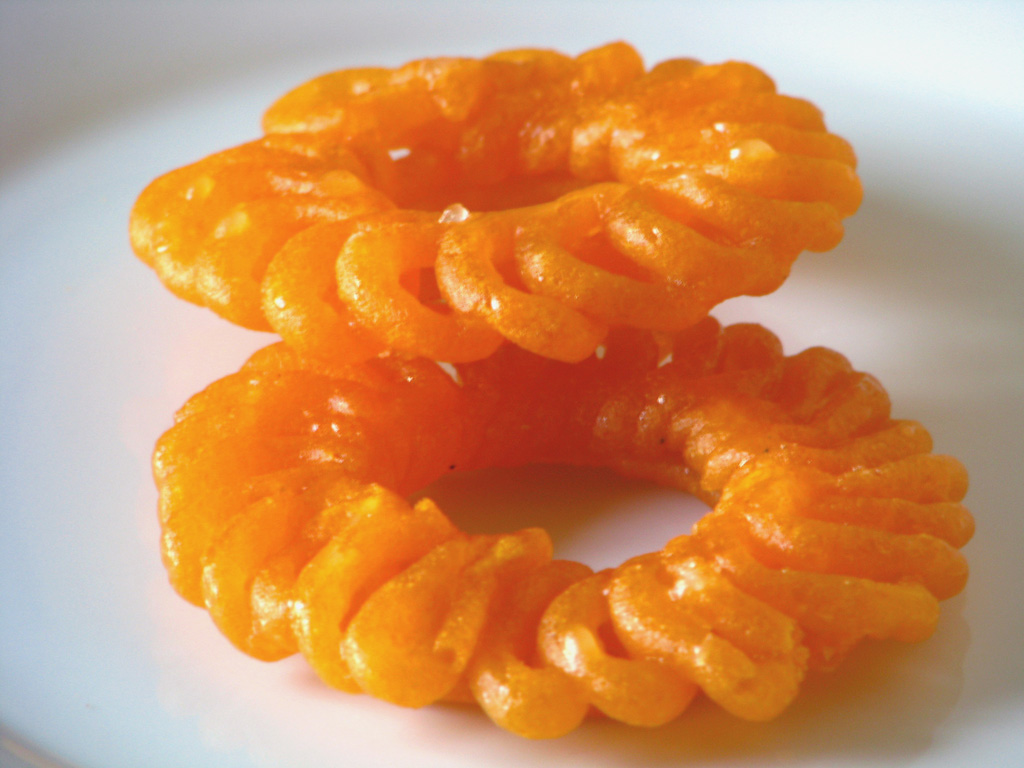
Imarti

=== Dress ===
The people of Auraiya have colorful and different attires. The sari is the most favourite dress of ladies of all denominations, though women in shalwar kameez combinations are usually met with.
The men in village use to wear the traditional attires like kurtas, lungis, dhotis and pajamas. The colorless khadi (homespun cloth) jackets known as 'Nehru Jackets' are also popular. The Muslim women wear the traditional all enveloping 'burqa' and the men use to wear a round cap on their head.

== Media ==
A number of newspapers and periodicals are published in Hindi, English, and Urdu. Amar Ujala, Dainik Bhaskar, and Dainik Jagran, have a wide circulation, with local editions published from several important cities. Major English language newspapers which are published and sold are The Times of India, Hindustan Times & The Hindu.
Multi system operators provide a mix of Hindi, English, Bengali, Nepali and international channels via cable. Cell phone providers include Vodafone, Airtel, BSNL, Reliance Communications, Uninor, Aircel, Tata Indicom, Idea Cellular, Jio, and Tata DoCoMo.

== Sports ==
Cricket and football are the most popular sports in the district. There are several cricket grounds, or maidans, located across the region.
