= Bidhuna =

- Town
- Location in Uttar Pradesh, India
- Coordinates: 26.82°N 79.52°E
- Country: India
- State: Uttar Pradesh
- District: Auraiya

Government
  - MLA: Rekha Verma (SP)
- Elevation: 209 m (686 ft)

Population (2021)
  - Total: 98,000

Languages
  - Official: Hindi
- Time zone: UTC+5:30 (IST)
- PIN Code: 206243

Bidhuna is a town and a nagar panchayat in Auraiya district in the state of Uttar Pradesh, India.

== Geography ==
Bidhuna is located at 26.82°N 79.52°E. It has an average elevation of 133 metres (436 feet). Arind river crosses through Bidhuna.

== Demographics ==
As of 2001 India census, Bidhuna had a population of 27,161. Males constitute 53% of the population and females 47%. Bidhuna has an average literacy rate of 74%, higher than the national average of 59.5%; with male literacy of 78% and female literacy of 68%. 15% of the population is under 6 years of age.
