= 2024 Indian general election in Uttar Pradesh =

18th Indian general election in Uttar Pradesh

- 19 April – 1 June 2024

All 80 Uttar Pradesh seats in the Lok Sabha
- Opinion polls
- Turnout: 56.99% (▼2.22 pp)

Leader	Akhilesh Yadav	Yogi Adityanath
Alliance	INDIA	NDA
Leader since	2012	2013
Leader's seat	Kannauj	Did not contest
Last election	24.47%, 6 seats	52.88%, 64
Seats won	43	36
Seat change	▲37	▼28
Popular vote	38,160,235	38,307,930
Percentage	43.52%	43.69%
Swing	▲19.05 pp	▼9.19 pp
Prime Minister before election
Narendra Modi
BJP
Prime Minister after election
Narendra Modi
BJP

The 2024 Indian general election was held in Uttar Pradesh in seven phases from 19 April to 1 June to elect 80 members of the 18th Lok Sabha, with the results declared on 4 June. Bypolls for Dadraul, Lucknow East, Gainsari, and Duddhi assembly constituencies were held alongside this election.

Uttar Pradesh, along with Bihar and West Bengal, were the only states where the 2024 Indian general election was held in all seven phases.

All opinion polls and exit polls forecasted a landslide win for the BJP, but the INDIA alliance of SP and INC instead won 43 seats and secured 43.52% of the popular vote. Meanwhile the NDA won 36 seats and secured 43.69% of the popular vote.

== Election schedule ==
Poll event	Phase						
Poll event	I	II	III	IV	V	VI	VII
Notification date	20 March	28 March	12 April	18 April	26 April	29 April	7 May
Last date for filing nomination	27 March	4 April	19 April	25 April	3 May	6 May	14 May
Scrutiny of nomination	28 March	5 April	20 April	26 April	4 May	7 May	15 May
Last Date for withdrawal of nomination	30 March	8 April	22 April	29 April	6 May	9 May	17 May
Date of poll	19 April	26 April	7 May	13 May	20 May	25 May	1 June
Date of counting of votes/result	4 June 2024						
No. of constituencies	8	8	10	13	14	14	13

Schedule of 2024 Indian general election in Uttar Pradesh for each constituency

== Parties and alliances ==
=== National Democratic Alliance ===
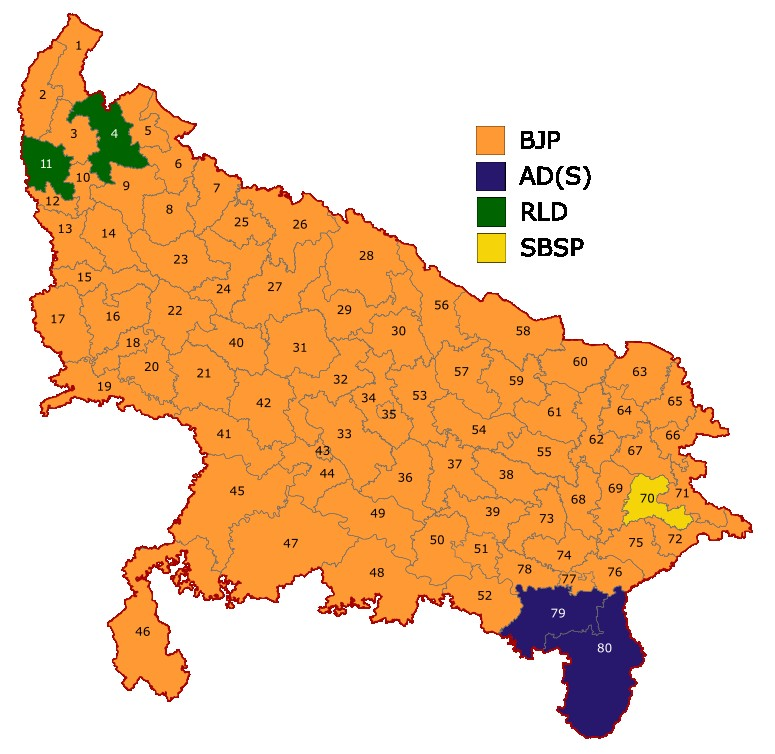

Party	Flag	Symbol	Leader	Contesting seats	
Bharatiya Janata Party			Narendra Modi	74	75
NISHAD			Sanjay Nishad	1	75
Apna Dal (Sonelal)			Anupriya Patel	2	
Rashtriya Lok Dal			Jayant Chaudhary	2	
Suheldev Bharatiya Samaj Party			Om Prakash Rajbhar	1	
Total				80	

=== Indian National Developmental Inclusive Alliance ===
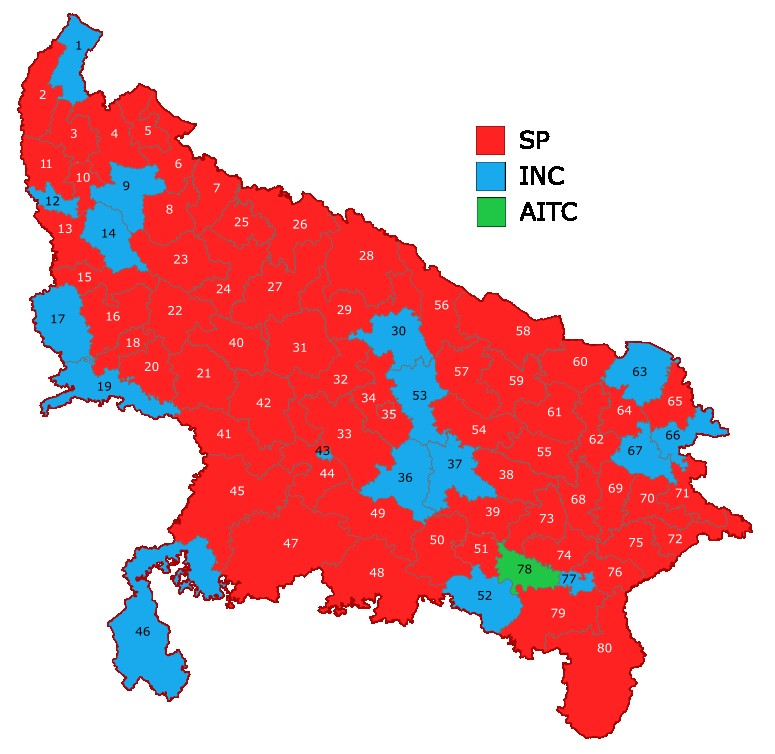

Indian National Developmental Inclusive Alliance
Party	Flag	Symbol	Leader	Seats	
Samajwadi Party			Akhilesh Yadav	61	62
Jan Adhikar Party			Babu Singh Kushwaha	1	62
Indian National Congress			Ajay Rai	17	
Trinamool Congress			Lalitesh Pati Tripathi	1	
Total				80	

=== Others ===
Party	Flag	Symbol	Leader	Contesting seats
Bahujan Samaj Party			Mayawati	79
Aazad Samaj Party (Kanshi Ram)			Chandrashekhar Azad	8
Communist Party of India				5

== Candidates ==
Constituency		NDA		INDIA		BSP	
#	Name	Party	Candidate	Party	Candidate	Party	Candidate
1	Saharanpur	BJP	Raghav Lakhanpal	INC	Imran Masood	BSP	Majid Ali
2	Kairana	BJP	Pradeep Kumar	SP	Iqra Choudhary	BSP	Sripal
3	Muzaffarnagar	BJP	Sanjeev Balyan	SP	Harendra Singh Malik	BSP	Dara Singh Prajapati
4	Bijnor	RLD	Chandan Chauhan	SP	Deepak Saini	BSP	Vijender Singh
5	Nagina (SC)	BJP	Om Kumar	SP	Manoj Kumar Paras	BSP	Surendra Pal Singh
6	Moradabad	BJP	Sarvesh Kumar Singh	SP	Ruchi Veera	BSP	Irfan Saifi
7	Rampur	BJP	Ghanshyam Singh Lodhi	SP	Mohibbullah Nadvi	BSP	Zeeshan Khan
8	Sambhal	BJP	Parmeshwar Lal Saini	SP	Zia ur Rahman Barq	BSP	Saulat Ali
9	Amroha	BJP	Kanwar Singh Tanwar	INC	Danish Ali	BSP	Mujahid Husain
10	Meerut	BJP	Arun Govil	SP	Sunita Verma	BSP	Devvrat Kumar Tyagi
11	Baghpat	RLD	Rajkumar Sangwan	SP	Amarpal Sharma	BSP	Praveen Bansal
12	Ghaziabad	BJP	Atul Garg	INC	Dolly Sharma	BSP	Nand Kishore Pundir
13	G. B. Nagar	BJP	Mahesh Sharma	SP	Mahendra Nagar	BSP	Rajendra Singh Solanki
14	Bulandshahr (SC)	BJP	Bhola Singh	INC	Shivram Valmiki	BSP	Girish Chandra
15	Aligarh	BJP	Satish Kumar Gautam	SP	Bijendra Singh	BSP	Hitendra Kumar
16	Hathras (SC)	BJP	Anoop Pradhan	SP	Jasveer Valmiki	BSP	Hembabu Dhangar
17	Mathura	BJP	Hema Malini	INC	Mukesh Dhangar	BSP	Suresh Singh
18	Agra (SC)	BJP	S. P. Singh Baghel	SP	Suresh Chand Kardam	BSP	Pooja Amrohi
19	Fatehpur Sikri	BJP	Raj Kumar Chahar	INC	Ramnath Sikarwar	BSP	Ramniwas Sharma
20	Firozabad	BJP	Thakur Vishwadeep Singh	SP	Akshay Yadav	BSP	Chaudhary Basheer Ahmad
21	Mainpuri	BJP	Jaiveer Singh	SP	Dimple Yadav	BSP	Shiv Prasad Yadav
22	Etah	BJP	Rajveer Singh	SP	Devesh Shakya	BSP	Mohd. Irfan
23	Badaun	BJP	Durvijay Singh Shakya	SP	Aditya Yadav	BSP	Muslim Khan
24	Aonla	BJP	Dharmendra Kashyap	SP	Neeraj Maurya	BSP	Abid Ali
25	Bareilly	BJP	Chhatrapal Singh	SP	Praveen Singh Aron		
26	Pilibhit	BJP	Jitin Prasada	SP	Bhagwat Sharan	BSP	Anis Ahmed Khan
27	Shahjahanpur (SC)	BJP	Arun Kumar Sagar	SP	Jyotsna Gond	BSP	Dod Ram Verma
28	Kheri	BJP	Ajay Mishra Teni	SP	Utkarsh Verma	BSP	Akshay Kalra
29	Dhaurahra	BJP	Rekha Verma	SP	Anand Bhadauriya	BSP	Shyam Kishor Awasthi
30	Sitapur	BJP	Rajesh Verma	INC	Rakesh Rathore	BSP	Mahendra Singh Yadav
31	Hardoi (SC)	BJP	Jai Prakash Rawat	SP	Usha Verma	BSP	Bhimrao Ambedkar
32	Misrikh (SC)	BJP	Ashok Kumar Rawat	SP	Sangita Rajwanshi	BSP	B R Ahirwar
33	Unnao	BJP	Sakshi Maharaj	SP	Annu Tandon	BSP	Ashok Pandey
34	Mohanlalganj (SC)	BJP	Kaushal Kishore	SP	R. K. Chaudhary	BSP	Rajesh Kumar
35	Lucknow	BJP	Rajnath Singh	SP	Ravidas Mehrotra	BSP	Mohammad Sarvar Malik
36	Rae Bareli	BJP	Dinesh Pratap Singh	INC	Rahul Gandhi	BSP	Thakur Prasad Yadav
37	Amethi	BJP	Smriti Irani	INC	Kishori Lal Sharma	BSP	Nanhe Singh Chauhan
38	Sultanpur	BJP	Menaka Gandhi	SP	Rambhual Nishad	BSP	Udraj Verma
39	Pratapgarh	BJP	Sangam Lal Gupta	SP	S. P. Singh Patel	BSP	Prathmesh Mishra
40	Farrukhabad	BJP	Mukesh Rajput	SP	Naval Kishore Shakya	BSP	Kranti Pandey
41	Etawah (SC)	BJP	Ram Shankar Katheria	SP	Jitendra Kumar Dohare	BSP	Sarika Singh Baghel
42	Kannauj	BJP	Subrat Pathak	SP	Akhilesh Yadav	BSP	Imran bin Zafar
43	Kanpur	BJP	Ramesh Awasthi	INC	Alok Misra	BSP	Kuldeep Bhadauriya
44	Akbarpur	BJP	Devendra Singh	SP	Raja Ram Pal	BSP	Rajesh Kumar Dwivedi
45	Jalaun (SC)	BJP	Bhanu Pratap Singh	SP	Narayan Das Ahirwar	BSP	Suresh Chandra Gautam
46	Jhansi	BJP	Anurag Sharma	INC	Pradeep Jain Aditya	BSP	Ravi Prakash
47	Hamirpur	BJP	Pushpendra Chandel	SP	Ajendra Singh Lodhi	BSP	Nirdosh Kumar Dixit
48	Banda	BJP	R. K. Singh Patel	SP	Krishna Devi Patel	BSP	Mayank Dwivedi
49	Fatehpur	BJP	Sadhvi Niranjan Jyoti	SP	Naresh Uttam Patel	BSP	Manish Singh Sachan
50	Kaushambi (SC)	BJP	Vinod Sonkar	SP	Pushpendra Saroj	BSP	Shubh Narayan
51	Phulpur	BJP	Praveen Patel	SP	Amarnath Maurya	BSP	Jagannath Pal
52	Allahabad	BJP	Neeraj Tripathi	INC	Ujjwal Rewati	BSP	Ramesh Kumar Patel
53	Barabanki (SC)	BJP	Rajrani Rawat	INC	Tanuj Punia	BSP	Shiv Kumar Doharey
54	Faizabad	BJP	Lallu Singh	SP	Awadhesh Prasad	BSP	Sachidanand Pandey
55	Ambedkar Nagar	BJP	Ritesh Pandey	SP	Lalji Verma	BSP	Qamar Hayat
56	Bahraich (SC)	BJP	Anand Kumar Gond	SP	Ramesh Gautam	BSP	Brijesh Kumar
57	Kaiserganj	BJP	Karan Bhushan Singh	SP	Bhagat Ram Mishra	BSP	Narendra Pandey
58	Shravasti	BJP	Saket Mishra	SP	Ram Shiromani Verma	BSP	Muinuddin Ahamad Khan
59	Gonda	BJP	Kirti Vardhan Singh	SP	Shreya Verma	BSP	Saurabh
60	Domariyaganj	BJP	Jagdambika Pal	SP	Bhishma Shankar Tiwari	BSP	Mohd. Nadeem
61	Basti	BJP	Harish Dwivedi	SP	Ram Prasad Chaudhary	BSP	Lavkush Patel
62	Sant Kabir Nagar	BJP	Praveen Kumar Nishad	SP	Pappu Nishad	BSP	Nadeem Ashraf
63	Maharajganj	BJP	Pankaj Chaudhary	INC	Virendra Chaudhary	BSP	Saiyad Danish
64	Gorakhpur	BJP	Ravi Kishan	SP	Kajal Nishad	BSP	Javed Simnani
65	Kushinagar	BJP	Vijay Kumar Dubey	SP	Ajay Pratap Singh	BSP	Shubh Narayan Chauhan
66	Deoria	BJP	Shashank Mani Tripathi	INC	Akhilesh Pratap Singh	BSP	Sandesh
67	Bansgaon (SC)	BJP	Kamlesh Paswan	INC	Sadal Prasad	BSP	Ramsamujh
68	Lalganj (SC)	BJP	Neelam Sonkar	SP	Daroga Saroj	BSP	Indu Chaudhry
69	Azamgarh	BJP	Dinesh Lal Yadav	SP	Dharmendra Yadav	BSP	Mashood Ansari
70	Ghosi	SBSP	Arvind Rajbhar	SP	Rajeev Kumar Rai	BSP	Balkrishna Chauhan
71	Salempur	BJP	Ravindra Kushawaha	SP	Ramashankar Rajbhar	BSP	Bhim Rajbhar
72	Ballia	BJP	Neeraj Shekhar	SP	Sanatan Pandey	BSP	Lallan Singh Yadav
73	Jaunpur	BJP	Kripashankar Singh	SP	Babu Singh Kushwaha	BSP	Shyam Singh Yadav
74	Machhlishahr (SC)	BJP	B. P. Saroj	SP	Priya Saroj	BSP	Kripa Shankar Saroj
75	Ghazipur	BJP	Paras Nath Rai	SP	Afzal Ansari	BSP	Umesh Singh
76	Chandauli	BJP	Mahendra Nath Pandey	SP	Virendra Singh	BSP	Satyendra Maurya
77	Varanasi	BJP	Narendra Modi	INC	Ajay Rai	BSP	Athar Jamaal Lari
78	Bhadohi	BJP	Vinod Kumar Bind	AITC	Lalitesh Pati Tripathi	BSP	Harishankar Singh
79	Mirzapur	AD(S)	Anupriya Patel	SP	Ramesh Chand Bind	BSP	Manish Tripathi
80	Robertsganj (SC)	AD(S)	Rinki Kol	SP	Chhotelal Kharwar	BSP	Dhaneshwar Gautam

== Issues ==
=== Paper leak ===
The UPPSC police recruitment exam was held on 17 and 18 February. Some candidates and student organisations alleged that other candidates had the question paper 8–12 hours prior to the exam, and that it was available at a price between ₹50,000 (US$603) and ₹200,000 (US$2,413). On 19 February, the UP Police Recruitment Board chairperson Renuka Mishra said that there was no evidence to prove that there was a paper leak before the exam, while simultaneously constituting an internal committee to investigate the allegations. On 23 February, a large number of students protested in Lucknow, questioning the authenticity of the exam and demanding cancellation & re-examination. Another group protested at the UPPSC headquarters at Prayagraj the same day. Congress leader Priyanka Gandhi and Samajwadi Party supremo Akhilesh Yadav tweeted in support of the students' protest, calling for a CBI probe into the incident. Protesting students ran the hashtag #ReExam_RO_ARO on social media. On 24 February, chief minister Yogi Adityanath announced that the exam had been cancelled and a re-exam would be conducted within the next six months.

== Surveys and polls ==
=== Opinion polls ===
Polling agency	Date published	Margin of error					Lead
Polling agency	Date published	Margin of error	NDA	INDIA	BSP	Others	Lead
ABP News-CVoter	March 2024	±5%	74	6	0	0	NDA
India Today-CVoter	February 2024	±3-5%	72	8	0	0	NDA
ABP News-CVoter	December 2023	±3-5%	73-75	4-6	0-2	0	NDA
Times Now-ETG	December 2023	±3%	70-74	4-8	0-1	1-3	NDA
India TV-CNX	October 2023	±3%	73	7	0	0	NDA
Times Now-ETG	September 2023	±3%	70-74	4-8	1-3	0-1	NDA
Times Now-ETG	August 2023	±3%	69-73	5-9	0-1	1-3	NDA
India Today-CVoter	August 2023	±3-5%	72	8	0	0	NDA
ABP News-Matrize	March 2023	±3%	67-73	1-2	0-4	3-6	NDA

Polling agency	Date published	Margin of error					Lead
Polling agency	Date published	Margin of error	NDA	INDIA	BSP	Others	Lead
ABP News-CVoter	March 2024	±5%	51%	35%	8%	6%	16
India Today-CVoter	February 2024	±3-5%	52%	36%	12%		16
India Today-CVoter	August 2023	±3-5%	49%	38%	13%		11

=== Exit polls ===
Polling agency					Lead
Polling agency	NDA	INDIA	BSP	Others	Lead
Republic-PMarq	69	11	0	0	NDA
DB Live	46-48	32-34	0	0	NDA
IndiaNews Dynamics	69	11	0	0	NDA
India TV-CNX	62-68	12-16	0-1	0	NDA
India-Today Axis My India	64-67	13-16	0-1	0	NDA
Jan Ki Baat	68-74	6–12	0	0	NDA
News Nation	67	13	0	0	NDA
News24-Today's Chanakya	68	12	0	0	NDA
TV9 Bharatvarsh- People's Insight - Polstrat	65	15	0	0	NDA
2019 election	64	6	10	0	NDA
Actual results	36	43	0	1	INDIA

== Voter turnout ==
=== Phase wise ===
Phase	Date	Constituencies	Voter turnout
I	19 April 2024	Saharanpur, Kairana, Muzaffarnagar, Bijnor, Nagina, Moradabad, Rampur, Pilibhit	61.11%
II	26 April 2024	Amroha, Meerut, Baghpat, Ghaziabad, Gautam Buddha Nagar, Bulandshahr, Aligarh, Mathura	55.19%
III	7 May 2024	Sambhal, Hathras, Agra, Fatehpur Sikri, Firozabad, Mainpuri, Etah, Badaun, Bareilly, Aonla	57.55%
IV	13 May 2024	Shahjahanpur, Kheri, Dhaurahra, Sitapur, Hardoi, Misrikh, Unnao, Farrukhabad, Etawah, Kannauj, Kanpur, Akbarpur, Bahraich	58.22%
V	20 May 2024	Mohanlalganj, Lucknow, Rae Bareli, Amethi, Jalaun, Jhansi, Hamirpur, Banda, Fatehpur, Kaushambi, Barabanki, Faizabad, Kaiserganj, Gonda,	58.02%
VI	25 May 2024	Sultanpur, Pratapgarh, Phulpur, Allahabad, Ambedkar Nagar, Shravasti, Domariyaganj, Basti, Sant Kabir Nagar, Lalganj, Azamgarh, Jaunpur, Machhlishahr, Bhadohi	54.04%
VII	1 June 2024	Maharajganj, Gorakhpur, Kushinagar, Deoria, Bansgaon, Ghosi, Salempur, Ballia, Ghazipur, Chandauli, Varanasi, Mirzapur, Robertsganj	55.85%
Total			

=== Constituency wise ===
Constituency		Poll date	Turnout	Swing (±pp)
1	Saharanpur	19 April 2024	66.14%	▼4.73
2	Kairana	19 April 2024	62.46%	▼4.99
3	Muzaffarnagar	19 April 2024	59.13%	▼9.29
4	Bijnor	19 April 2024	58.73%	▼7.49
5	Nagina	19 April 2024	60.75%	▼2.91
6	Moradabad	19 April 2024	62.18%	▼3.28
7	Rampur	19 April 2024	55.85%	▼7.34
8	Sambhal	7 May 2024	62.91%	▼1.82
9	Amroha	26 April 2024	64.58%	▼6.47
10	Meerut	26 April 2024	58.94%	▼5.35
11	Baghpat	26 April 2024	56.16%	▼8.52
12	Ghaziabad	26 April 2024	49.88%	▼6.01
13	Gautam Buddha Nagar	26 April 2024	53.63%	▼6.86
14	Bulandshahr	26 April 2024	56.16%	▼6.76
15	Aligarh	26 April 2024	56.93%	▼4.75
16	Hathras	7 May 2024	55.71%	▼6.05
17	Mathura	26 April 2024	49.41%	▼11.67
18	Agra	7 May 2024	54.08%	▼5.04
19	Fatehpur Sikri	7 May 2024	57.19%	▼3.23
20	Firozabad	7 May 2024	58.53%	▼1.60
21	Mainpuri	7 May 2024	58.73%	▲1.96
22	Etah	7 May 2024	59.31%	▼2.39
23	Badaun	7 May 2024	54.35%	▼2.82
24	Aonla	7 May 2024	57.44%	▼1.53
25	Bareilly	7 May 2024	58.03%	▼1.43
26	Pilibhit	19 April 2024	63.11%	▼4.30
27	Shahjahanpur	13 May 2024	53.36%	▼2.79
28	Kheri	13 May 2024	64.68%	▲0.48
29	Dhaurahra	13 May 2024	64.54%	▼0.15
30	Sitapur	13 May 2024	62.54%	▼1.39
31	Hardoi	13 May 2024	57.52%	▼1.02
32	Misrikh	13 May 2024	55.89%	▼1.28
33	Unnao	13 May 2024	55.46%	▼1.01
34	Mohanlalganj	20 May 2024	62.88%	▲0.09
35	Lucknow	20 May 2024	52.28%	▼2.50
36	Rae Bareli	20 May 2024	58.12%	▲1.78
37	Amethi	20 May 2024	54.34%	▲0.26
38	Sultanpur	25 May 2024	55.63	▼0.74
39	Pratapgarh	25 May 2024	51.45	▼2.11
40	Farrukhabad	13 May 2024	59.08%	▲0.36
41	Etawah	13 May 2024	56.36%	▼2.16
42	Kannauj	13 May 2024	61.08%	▲0.22
43	Kanpur	13 May 2024	53.05%	▲1.40
44	Akbarpur	13 May 2024	57.78%	▼0.35
45	Jalaun	20 May 2024	56.18%	▼2.31
46	Jhansi	20 May 2024	63.86%	▼3.82
47	Hamirpur	20 May 2024	60.60%	▼1.72
48	Banda	20 May 2024	59.70%	▼1.10
49	Fatehpur	20 May 2024	57.09%	▲0.30
50	Kaushambi	20 May 2024	52.80%	▼1.76
51	Phulpur	25 May 2024	48.91%	▲0.21
52	Allahabad	25 May 2024	51.82%	▼0.01
53	Barabanki	20 May 2024	67.20%	▲3.59
54	Faizabad	20 May 2024	59.14%	▼0.55
55	Ambedkar Nagar	25 May 2024	61.58%	▲0.50
56	Bahraich	13 May 2024	57.42%	▲0.18
57	Kaiserganj	20 May 2024	55.68%	▲1.29
58	Shravasti	25 May 2024	52.83%	▲0.75
59	Gonda	20 May 2024	51.62%	▼0.58
60	Domariyaganj	25 May 2024	51.97%	▼0.29
61	Basti	25 May 2024	56.67%	▼0.52
62	Sant Kabir Nagar	25 May 2024	52.57%	▼1.63
63	Maharajganj	1 June 2024	60.31%	▼3.76
64	Gorakhpur	1 June 2024	54.93%	▼4.88
65	Kushinagar	1 June 2024	57.57%	▼2.22
66	Deoria	1 June 2024	55.51%	▼2.39
67	Bansgaon	1 June 2024	51.79%	▼3.59
68	Lalganj	25 May 2024	54.38%	▼0.48
69	Azamgarh	25 May 2024	56.16%	▼1.40
70	Ghosi	1 June 2024	55.05%	▼2.26
71	Salempur	1 June 2024	51.38%	▼4.05
72	Ballia	1 June 2024	52.05%	▼2.30
73	Jaunpur	25 May 2024	55.59%	▼0.18
74	Machhlishahr	25 May 2024	54.49%	▼1.53
75	Ghazipur	1 June 2024	55.45%	▼3.43
76	Chandauli	1 June 2024	60.58%	▼1.25
77	Varanasi	1 June 2024	56.49%	▼0.64
78	Bhadohi	25 May 2024	53.07%	▼0.46
79	Mirzapur	1 June 2024	57.92%	▼2.19
80	Robertsganj	1 June 2024	56.78%	▼0.59
Total			56.92%	▼2.29

== Strategies and outcomes ==
In this election, Samajwadi Party won the highest number of seats out of a total 80 seats of Lok Sabha in Uttar Pradesh. The party under Akhilesh Yadav relied upon Other Backward Castes (OBC) and the PDA—Picchde (backward castes), Dalits, and Alpsankhyaks (minorities)—in order to make inroads amongst the non-Yadav OBC communities. It fielded a large number of candidates from Kurmi caste as well as from the Maurya-Kushwaha community. It also relied upon Dalit communities such as Pasis. Consequently, in the final result, OBC MPs outnumbered the Forward Caste MPs. Senior Kurmi leaders like Naresh Uttam Patel, Ram Prasad Chaudhary and Lalji Verma were victorious. The controversial MP Ajay Mishra Teni was defeated by Utkarsh Verma. In Jaunpur Lok Sabha constituency, SP's Babu Singh Kushwaha defeated BJP's Kripa Shankar Singh despite the backing of local strongman from Thakur community Dhananjay Singh. Despite this however, the National Democratic Alliance had a slightly greater vote share than the INDIA block with the Bharatiya Janata Party winning a plurality.

== Results ==
=== Results by party or alliance ===
Alliance	INDIA	NDA	Oth
Seats	43	36	1

Party	SP	INC	BJP	RLD	AD(S)	ASP(KR)
Seats	37	6	33	2	1	1

Alliance/party		Popular vote			Seats		
Alliance/party		Votes	%	±pp	Contested	Won	+/−
INDIA	SP	29,451,786	33.59	▲15.48	62	37	▲32
INDIA	INC	8,294,318	9.46	▲3.1	17	6	▲05
INDIA	AITC	414,131	0.47	▲0.47	1	0	Steady
INDIA	Total	38,160,235	43.52	▲19.06	80	43	▲37
NDA	BJP	36,267,072	41.37	▼8.61	75	33	▼29
NDA	RLD	893,460	1.02	▼0.67	2	2	▲02
NDA	AD(S)	807,210	0.92	▼0.29	2	1	▼01
NDA	SBSP	340,188	0.38	▲0.08	1	0	Steady
NDA	Total	38,307,930	43.69	▼7.50	80	36	▼28
ASP(KR)		512,552	0.58	New	2	1	▲1
BSP		8,233,562	9.39	▼10.04	79	0	▼10
Others							
IND							
NOTA		631,327	0.72				
Total			100	–		80	-

=== Results by region ===
Division	Seats					
Division	Seats	SP	BJP	INC	BSP	OTH
Bundelkhand	4	3	1	—N/a	—N/a	—N/a
Central Uttar Pradesh	24	11	8	5	—N/a	—N/a
North-East Uttar Pradesh	17	8	9	—N/a	—N/a	—N/a
Rohilkhand	10	5	4	—N/a	—N/a	1
South-East Uttar Pradesh	8	5	2	—N/a	—N/a	1
West Uttar Pradesh	17	5	9	1	—N/a	2
Total	80	37	33	6	0	4

=== Results by constituency ===
Constituency				Winner				Runner Up				Margin	%
#	Name	Poll date	Poll %	Candidate	Party	Votes	%	Candidate	Party	Votes	%	Margin	%
1	Saharanpur	19 April 2024	66.14▼	Imran Masood	INC	5,47,967	44.57	Raghav Lakhanpal	BJP	4,83,425	39.32	64,542	5.25
2	Kairana	19 April 2024	62.46▼	Iqra Choudhary	SP	5,28,013	48.90	Pradeep Chaudhary	BJP	4,58,897	42.50	69,116	6.40
3	Muzaffarnagar	19 April 2024	59.13▼	Harendra Singh Malik	SP	4,70,721	43.64	Sanjeev Balyan	BJP	4,46,049	41.35	24,672	2.29
4	Bijnor	19 April 2024	58.73▼	Chandan Chauhan	RLD	4,04,493	39.48	Deepak Saini	SP	3,66,985	35.82	37,508	3.66
5	Nagina (SC)	19 April 2024	60.75▼	Chandrashekhar Azad	ASP	512,552	51.19	Om Kumar	BJP	359,751	36.06	1,51,473	15.13
6	Moradabad	19 April 2024	62.18▼	Ruchi Veera	SP	6,37,363	49.67	Sarvesh Kumar Singh	BJP	5,31,601	41.43	1,05,762	8.24
7	Rampur	19 April 2024	55.85▼	Mohibbullah Nadvi	SP	4,81,503	49.74	Ghanshyam Singh Lodhi	BJP	3,94,069	40.71	87,434	9.03
8	Sambhal	7 May 2024	62.91▼	Zia ur Rahman Barq	SP	5,71,161	47.80	Parmeshwar Lal Saini	BJP	4,49,667	37.63	1,21,494	10.17
9	Amroha	26 April 2024	64.58▼	Kanwar Singh Tanwar	BJP	4,76,506	42.90	Danish Ali	INC	4,47,836	40.32	28,670	2.58
10	Meerut	26 April 2024	58.94▼	Arun Govil	BJP	5,46,469	46.21	Sunita Verma	SP	5,35,884	45.32	10,585	0.89
11	Baghpat	26 April 2024	56.16▼	Rajkumar Sangwan	RLD	4,88,967	52.36	Amarpal Sharma	SP	3,29,508	35.29	1,59,459	17.07
12	Ghaziabad	26 April 2024	49.88▼	Atul Garg	BJP	8,54,170	58.09	Dolly Sharma	INC	5,17,205	35.17	3,36,965	22.92
13	G. B. Nagar	26 April 2024	53.63▼	Mahesh Sharma	BJP	8,57,829	59.69	Mahendra Nagar	SP	2,98,357	35.17	5,59,472	24.52
14	Bulandshahr (SC)	26 April 2024	56.16▼	Bhola Singh	BJP	5,97,310	56.65	Shivram Valmiki	INC	3,22,176	30.56	2,75,134	26.09
15	Aligarh	26 April 2024	56.93▼	Satish Kumar Gautam	BJP	5,01,834	44.28	Bijendra Singh	SP	4,86,187	42.90	15,647	1.38
16	Hathras (SC)	7 May 2024	55.71▼	Anoop Pradhan	BJP	5,54,746	51.24	Jasveer Valmiki	SP	3,07,428	28.39	2,47,318	22.85
17	Mathura	26 April 2024	49.41▼	Hema Malini	BJP	5,10,064	53.29	Mukesh Dhangar	INC	2,16,657	22.64	2,93,407	30.65
18	Agra (SC)	7 May 2024	54.08▼	S. P. Singh Baghel	BJP	5,99,397	53.34	Suresh Chand Kardam	SP	3,28,103	29.20	2,71,294	24.14
19	Fatehpur Sikri	7 May 2024	57.19▼	Raj Kumar Chahar	BJP	4,45,657	43.09	Ramnath Sikarwar	INC	4,02,252	38.90	43,405	4.19
20	Firozabad	7 May 2024	58.53▼	Akshay Yadav	SP	5,43,037	49.01	Thakur Vishwadeep Singh	BJP	4,53,725	40.95	89,312	8.06
21	Mainpuri	7 May 2024	58.73▲	Dimple Yadav	SP	5,98,526	56.79	Jayveer Singh	BJP	3,76,887	35.76	2,21,639	21.03
22	Etah	7 May 2024	59.31▼	Devesh Shakya	SP	4,75,808	47.09	Rajveer Singh	BJP	4,47,756	44.32	28,052	2.77
23	Badaun	7 May 2024	54.35▼	Aditya Yadav	SP	5,01,855	45.97	Durvijay Singh Shakya	BJP	4,66,864	42.76	34,991	3.21
24	Aonla	7 May 2024	57.44▼	Neeraj Maurya	SP	4,92,515	45.23	Dharmendra Kashyap	BJP	4,76,546	43.76	15,969	1.47
25	Bareilly	7 May 2024	58.03▼	Chhatrapal Gangwar	BJP	5,67,127	50.66	Praveen Singh Aron	SP	5,32,323	47.55	34,804	3.11
26	Pilibhit	19 April 2024	63.11▼	Jitin Prasada	BJP	6,07,158	52.30	Bhagwat Sharan Gangwar	SP	4,42,223	38.09	1,64,935	14.21
27	Shahjahanpur (SC)	13 May 2024	53.36▼	Arun Kumar Sagar	BJP	5,92,718	47.50	Jyotsna Gond	SP	5,37,339	43.06	55,379	4.44
28	Kheri	13 May 2024	64.68▲	Utkarsh Verma	SP	5,57,365	45.94	Ajay Mishra Teni	BJP	5,23,036	43.11	34,329	2.83
29	Dhaurahra	13 May 2024	64.54▼	Anand Bhadauriya	SP	4,43,743	39.91	Rekha Verma	BJP	4,39,294	39.51	4,449	0.40
30	Sitapur	13 May 2024	62.54▼	Rakesh Rathore	INC	5,31,138	48.20	Rajesh Verma	BJP	4,41,497	40.06	89,641	8.14
31	Hardoi (SC)	13 May 2024	57.52▼	Jai Prakash Rawat	BJP	4,86,798	44.25	Usha Verma	SP	4,58,942	41.72	27,856	2.53
32	Misrikh (SC)	13 May 2024	55.89▼	Ashok Kumar Rawat	BJP	4,75,016	45.15	Sangita Rajwanshi	SP	4,41,610	41.98	33,406	3.17
33	Unnao	13 May 2024	55.46▼	Sakshi Maharaj	BJP	6,16,133	47.31	Annu Tandon	SP	5,80,315	44.56	35,818	2.75
34	Mohanlalganj (SC)	20 May 2024	62.88▲	R. K. Chaudhary	SP	6,67,869	48.49	Kaushal Kishore	BJP	5,97,577	43.48	70,292	5.01
35	Lucknow	20 May 2024	52.28▼	Rajnath Singh	BJP	612,709	53.59	Ravidas Mehrotra	SP	477,550	42.00	1,35,159	11.59
36	Rae Bareli	20 May 2024	58.12▲	Rahul Gandhi	INC	6,87,649	66.17	Dinesh Pratap Singh	BJP	2,97,619	28.64	3,90,030	37.53
37	Amethi	20 May 2024	54.34▲	Kishori Lal Sharma	INC	5,39,228	54.99	Smriti Irani	BJP	3,72,032	37.94	1,67,196	17.05
38	Sultanpur	25 May 2024	55.63▼	Rambhual Nishad	SP	4,44,330	43.00	Menaka Gandhi	BJP	4,01,156	38.82	43,174	4.18
39	Pratapgarh	25 May 2024	51.45▼	S. P. Singh Patel	SP	4,41,932	46.65	Sangam Lal Gupta	BJP	3,75,726	39.66	66,206	6.99
40	Farrukhabad	13 May 2024	59.08▲	Mukesh Rajput	BJP	4,87,963	47.20	Naval Kishore Shakya	SP	4,85,285	46.94	2,678	0.26
41	Etawah (SC)	13 May 2024	56.36▼	Jitendra Kumar Dohare	SP	4,90,747	47.47	Ram Shankar Katheria	BJP	4,32,328	41.82	58,419	5.65
42	Kannauj	13 May 2024	61.08▲	Akhilesh Yadav	SP	6,42,292	52.74	Subrat Pathak	BJP	4,71,370	38.71	1,70,922	14.03
43	Kanpur	13 May 2024	53.05▲	Ramesh Awasthi	BJP	4,43,055	49.93	Alok Misra	INC	4,22,087	47.56	20,968	2.37
44	Akbarpur	13 May 2024	57.78▼	Devendra Singh	BJP	5,17,423	47.60	Raja Ram Pal	SP	4,73,078	43.52	44,345	4.08
45	Jalaun (SC)	20 May 2024	56.18▼	Narayan Das Ahirwar	SP	5,30,180	46.96	Bhanu Pratap Singh Verma	BJP	4,76,282	42.19	53,898	4.77
46	Jhansi	20 May 2024	63.86▼	Anurag Sharma	BJP	6,90,316	50.00	Pradeep Jain Aditya	INC	5,87,702	42.57	1,02,614	7.43
47	Hamirpur	20 May 2024	60.60▼	Ajendra Singh Lodhi	SP	4,90,683	44.00	Pushpendra Singh Chandel	BJP	4,88,054	43.76	2,629	0.24
48	Banda	20 May 2024	59.70▼	Krishna Devi Patel	SP	4,06,567	38.94	R. K. Singh Patel	BJP	3,35,357	32.12	71,210	6.82
49	Fatehpur	20 May 2024	57.09▲	Naresh Uttam Patel	SP	5,00,328	45.20	Sadhvi Niranjan Jyoti	BJP	4,67,129	42.20	33,199	3.00
50	Kaushambi (SC)	20 May 2024	52.80▲	Pushpendra Saroj	SP	5,09,787	50.51	Vinod Sonkar	BJP	4,05,843	40.21	1,03,944	10.30
51	Phulpur	25 May 2024	48.91▲	Praveen Patel	BJP	4,52,600	44.60	Amarnath Maurya	SP	4,48,268	44.17	4,332	0.43
52	Allahabad	25 May 2024	51.82▲	Ujjwal Rewati Singh	INC	4,62,145	48.80	Neeraj Tripathi	BJP	4,03,350	42.59	58,795	6.21
53	Barabanki (SC)	20 May 2024	67.20▲	Tanuj Punia	INC	7,19,927	55.78	Rajrani Rawat	BJP	5,04,223	39.07	2,15,704	16.71
54	Faizabad	20 May 2024	59.14▼	Awadhesh Prasad	SP	554,289	48.59	Lallu Singh	BJP	499,722	43.81	54,567	4.78
55	Ambedkar Nagar	25 May 2024	61.58▲	Lalji Verma	SP	5,44,959	46.30	Ritesh Pandey	BJP	4,07,712	34.64	1,37,247	11.66
56	Bahraich (SC)	13 May 2024	57.42▲	Anand Kumar Gond	BJP	5,18,802	49.10	Ramesh Gautam	SP	4,54,575	43.02	64,227	6.08
57	Kaiserganj	20 May 2024	55.68▲	Karan Bhushan Singh	BJP	5,71,263	53.79	Bhagat Ram Mishra	SP	4,22,420	39.77	1,48,843	14.02
58	Shravasti	25 May 2024	52.83▲	Ram Shiromani Verma	SP	5,11,055	48.83	Saket Mishra	BJP	4,34,382	41.51	76,673	7.32
59	Gonda	20 May 2024	51.62▼	Kirti Vardhan Singh	BJP	4,74,258	49.77	Shreya Verma	SP	4,28,034	44.92	46,224	4.85
60	Domariyaganj	25 May 2024	51.97▼	Jagdambika Pal	BJP	4,63,303	45.47	Bhishma Shankar Tiwari	SP	4,20,575	41.27	42,728	4.20
61	Basti	25 May 2024	56.67▼	Ram Prasad Chaudhary	SP	5,27,005	48.67	Harish Dwivedi	BJP	4,26,011	39.34	1,00,994	9.33
62	Sant Kabir Nagar	25 May 2024	52.57▼	Laxmikant	SP	4,98,695	45.70	Praveen Kumar Nishad	BJP	4,06,525	37.25	92,170	8.45
63	Maharajganj	1 June 2024	60.31▼	Pankaj Chaudhary	BJP	5,91,310	48.85	Virendra Chaudhary	INC	5,55,859	45.92	35,451	2.93
64	Gorakhpur	1 June 2024	54.93▼	Ravindra Kishan Shukla	BJP	584,512	50.75	Kajal Nishad	SP	482,308	41.78	103,526	8.97
65	Kushinagar	1 June 2024	57.57▼	Vijay Kumar Dubey	BJP	5,16,345	47.79	Ajay Pratap Singh	SP	4,34,555	40.22	81,790	7.57
66	Deoria	1 June 2024	55.51▼	Shashank Mani Tripathi	BJP	5,04,541	48.36	Akhilesh Pratap Singh	INC	4,69,699	45.02	34,842	3.34
67	Bansgaon (SC)	1 June 2024	51.79▼	Kamlesh Paswan	BJP	4,28,693	45.38	Sadal Prasad	INC	4,25,543	45.04	3,150	0.34
68	Lalganj (SC)	25 May 2024	54.38▼	Daroga Saroj	SP	4,39,959	43.85	Neelam Sonkar	BJP	3,24,936	32.38	1,15,023	11.47
69	Azamgarh	25 May 2024	56.16▼	Dharmendra Yadav	SP	5,08,239	48.20	Dinesh Lal Yadav 'Nirahua'	BJP	3,47,204	32.93	1,61,035	15.27
70	Ghosi	1 June 2024	55.05▼	Rajeev Kumar Rai	SP	5,03,131	43.73	Arvind Rajbhar	SBSP	3,40,188	29.57	1,62,943	14.16
71	Salempur	1 June 2024	51.38▼	Ramashankar Rajbhar	SP	4,05,472	44.20	Ravindra Kushawaha	BJP	4,01,899	43.81	3,573	0.39
72	Ballia	1 June 2024	52.05▼	Sanatan Pandey	SP	4,67,068	46.37	Neeraj Shekhar	BJP	4,23,684	42.06	43,384	4.31
73	Jaunpur	25 May 2024	55.59▼	Babu Singh Kushwaha	SP	5,09,130	46.21	Kripashankar Singh	BJP	4,09,795	37.19	99,335	9.02
74	Machhlishahr (SC)	25 May 2024	54.49▼	Priya Saroj	SP	4,51,292	42.57	B. P. Saroj	BJP	4,15,442	39.19	35,850	3.38
75	Ghazipur	1 June 2024	55.45▼	Afzal Ansari	SP	5,39,912	46.82	Paras Nath Rai	BJP	4,15,051	35.99	1,24,861	10.83
76	Chandauli	1 June 2024	60.58▼	Virendra Singh	SP	4,74,476	42.50	Mahendra Nath Pandey	BJP	4,52,911	40.57	21,565	1.93
77	Varanasi	1 June 2024	56.49▼	Narendra Modi	BJP	6,12,970	54.24	Ajay Rai	INC	4,60,457	40.74	1,52,513	11.50
78	Bhadohi	25 May 2024	53.07▼	Vinod Kumar Bind	BJP	4,59,982	42.39	Lalitesh Pati Tripathi	AITC	4,15,910	38.33	44,072	4.06
79	Mirzapur	1 June 2024	57.92▼	Anupriya Patel	AD(S)	4,71,631	42.67	Ramesh Chand Bind	SP	4,33,821	39.25	37,810	3.42
80	Robertsganj (SC)	1 June 2024	56.78▼	Chhotelal Kharwar	SP	4,65,848	46.14	Rinki Kol	AD(S)	3,36,614	33.34	1,29,234	12.80

== Assembly wise lead of Parties ==
=== Partywise leads ===
2024 Uttar Pradesh Lok Sabha election assembly wise lead map

Party		Assembly segments	Position in assembly (as of December 2024)
INDIA	SP	184	107
INDIA	INC	39	2
INDIA	AITC	1	0
INDIA	Total	224	109
NDA	BJP	162	257
NDA	RLD	8	9
NDA	AD(S)	4	13
NDA	SBSP	0	6
NDA	NISHAD	Did Not Contest	5
NDA	Total	174	290
Others	ASP(KR)	5	0
Others	JSD(L)	Did Not Contest	2
Others	BSP	0	1
Others	Total	5	3
Total		403	

=== Assembly Seat wise leads ===
Constituency		Winner			Runner-up			Margin
#	Name	Party	Votes	%	Party	Votes	%	Margin
Saharanpur Lok Sabha constituency
1	Behat	INC	1,33,394	49.55	BJP	95,165	35.35	38,229
3	Saharanpur Nagar	INC	1,34,949	49.22	BJP	1,29,933	47.39	5,016
4	Saharanpur	INC	1,21,409	48.94	BJP	76,783	30.95	44,626
5	Deoband	BJP	94,289	42.99	INC	73,238	33.39	21,051
6	Rampur Maniharan (SC)	BJP	85,950	39.71	INC	84,393	38.99	1,557
Kairana Lok Sabha constituency
2	Nakur	SP	1,26,320	49.79	BJP	92,529	36.48	33,601
7	Gangoh	SP	1,17,901	48.09	BJP	1,00,986	41.19	16,915
8	Kairana	SP	1,16,265	55.73	BJP	85,616	41.04	30,649
9	Thana Bhawan	SP	85,904	45.82	BJP	85,217	45.46	687
10	Shamli	BJP	91,727	50.78	SP	80,497	44.56	11,230
Muzaffarnagar Lok Sabha constituency
11	Budhana	SP	1,16,151	48.00	BJP	1,00,075	41.36	16,076
12	Charthawal	SP	95,766	45.16	BJP	82,085	38.71	13,681
14	Muzaffarnagar	BJP	97,401	45.43	SP	96,600	45.06	801
15	Khatauli	BJP	83,473	40.84	SP	80,461	39.36	3,012
44	Sardhana	SP	80,826	39.97	BJP	80,781	39.95	45
Bijnor Lok Sabha constituency
13	Purqazi (SC)	RLD	77,298	38.43	SP	65,329	32.48	11,969
16	Meerapur	RLD	72,320	36.78	SP	63,351	32.22	8,969
22	Bijnor	SP	89,429	39.47	RLD	88,438	39.03	991
23	Chandpur	SP	88,691	44.01	RLD	78,075	38.74	10,616
45	Hastinapur (SC)	RLD	86,473	44.35	SP	59,426	30.47	27,047
Nagina Lok Sabha constituency
17	Najibabad	ASP	1,02,541	47.13	BJP	68,943	31.69	33,598
18	Nagina (SC)	ASP	1,12,518	52.67	BJP	68,880	32.24	43,638
20	Dhampur	ASP	90,518	49.34	BJP	73,680	40.16	16,838
21	Nehtaur (SC)	ASP	1,03,544	54.86	BJP	72,520	38.42	31,024
24	Noorpur	ASP	1,02,691	52.53	BJP	75,728	38.74	26,963
Moradabad Lok Sabha constituency
19	Barhapur	SP	1,03,426	45.62	BJP	99,450	43.87	3,976
25	Kanth	SP	1,27,838	48.96	BJP	99,599	38.15	28,239
26	Thakurdwara	SP	1,24,602	47.96	BJP	1,11,871	43.06	12,731
27	Moradabad Rural	SP	1,34,058	57.63	BJP	82,588	35.50	51,470
28	Moradabad Nagar	SP	1,46,809	48.84	BJP	1,36,668	45.46	10,141
Rampur Lok Sabha constituency
34	Swar	SP	1,11,521	59.18	BJP	60,771	32.25	50,750
35	Chamraua	SP	1,04,528	57.63	BJP	65,280	35.99	39,248
36	Bilaspur	BJP	1,03,631	49.41	SP	83,764	39.94	19,867
37	Rampur	SP	1,03,095	58.06	BJP	65,275	36.76	37,820
38	Milak (SC)	BJP	98,197	46.84	SP	78,344	37.37	19,853
Sambhal Lok Sabha constituency
29	Kundarki	SP	1,43,415	54.02	BJP	86,371	32.53	57,044
30	Bilari	SP	97,856	42.16	BJP	94,534	40.72	3,322
31	Chandausi (SC)	BJP	1,14,204	52.81	SP	67,886	31.39	46,318
32	Asmoli	SP	1,17,638	47.60	BJP	88,415	35.78	29,223
33	Sambhal	SP	1,43,950	61.85	BJP	65,459	28.12	78,491
Amroha Lok Sabha constituency
39	Dhanaura (SC)	BJP	1,02,402	46.81	INC	67,381	30.80	35,021
40	Naugawan Sadat	BJP	97,299	43.11	INC	93,021	41.21	4,278
41	Amroha	INC	1,32,003	61.95	BJP	57,586	27.02	74,417
42	Hasanpur	BJP	1,15,277	47.79	INC	76,514	31.71	38,763
60	Garhmukteshwar	BJP	1,02,646	48.92	INC	78,424	37.37	24,222
Meerut Lok Sabha constituency
46	Kithore	SP	1,10,315	48.33	BJP	93,578	41.00	16,737
47	Meerut Cantonment	BJP	1,61,892	66.04	SP	65,779	26.83	96,113
48	Meerut	SP	1,13,289	58.69	BJP	75,374	39.05	37,915
49	Meerut South	SP	1,40,354	49.13	BJP	1,19,881	41.96	20,473
59	Hapur (SC)	SP	1,05,272	46.37	BJP	93,650	41.25	11,622
Baghpat Lok Sabha constituency
43	Siwalkhas	RLD	94,799	46.11	SP	82,195	39.98	12,604
50	Chhaprauli	RLD	1,02,195	58.95	SP	54,970	31.73	47,225
51	Baraut	RLD	93,595	56.91	SP	55,205	33.57	38,390
52	Baghpat	RLD	88,880	46.95	SP	79,089	41.78	9,791
57	Modinagar	RLD	1,06,296	54.22	SP	57,028	29.09	49,268
Ghaziabad Lok Sabha constituency
53	Loni	BJP	1,43,522	50.48	INC	1,21,668	42.79	21,854
54	Muradnagar	BJP	1,57,283	62.26	INC	80,515	31.87	76,768
55	Sahibabad	BJP	3,11,036	68.91	INC	1,19,852	26.55	1,91,184
56	Ghaziabad	BJP	1,37,206	60.28	INC	73,950	32.48	63,256
58	Dholana	INC	1,20,714	47.78	BJP	1,03,989	41.16	16,725
Gautam Buddha Nagar Lok Sabha constituency
61	Noida	BJP	2,77,999	75.52	SP	63,506	17.26	2,14,493
62	Dadri	BJP	2,51,359	65.32	SP	88,088	22.89	1,63,271
63	Jewar	BJP	1,04,759	51.47	BSP	62,662	30.79	42,097
64	Sikandrabad	BJP	1,05,966	43.56	SP	77,795	31.98	28,171
70	Khurja (SC)	BJP	1,15,330	49.30	BSP	76,532	32.72	38,798
Bulandshahr Lok Sabha constituency
65	Bulandshahr	BJP	1,14,959	48.97	INC	95,899	40.85	19,060
66	Syana	BJP	1,35,035	60.43	INC	62,027	27.76	73,008
67	Anupshahr	BJP	1,14,218	54.35	INC	68,793	32.73	45,425
68	Debai	BJP	1,30,094	67.29	INC	40,271	20.83	89,823
69	Shikarpur	BJP	99,734	53.15	INC	54,053	28.81	45,681
Aligarh Lok Sabha constituency
71	Khair (SC)	SP	95,606	42.41	BJP	94,205	41.79	1,401
72	Barauli	BJP	1,15,986	51.31	SP	79,872	35.33	36,114
73	Atrauli	BJP	1,02,802	47.10	SP	85,777	39.30	17,025
75	Koil	SP	1,18,160	50.45	BJP	89,119	38.05	29,041
76	Aligarh	SP	1,06,173	46.72	BJP	98,341	43.28	7,832
Hathras Lok Sabha constituency
74	Chharra	BJP	1,11,840	50.55	SP	70,537	31.88	41,303
77	Iglas (SC)	BJP	1,08,719	50.78	SP	62,479	29.18	46,240
78	Hathras (SC)	BJP	1,32,514	56.60	SP	51,192	21.87	81,322
79	Sadabad	BJP	1,05,264	52.98	SP	52,409	26.37	52,855
80	Sikandra Rao	BJP	93,997	44.57	SP	70,020	33.20	23,977
Mathura Lok Sabha constituency
81	Chhata	BJP	1,07,946	58.53	INC	33,400	18.11	74,546
82	Mant	BJP	86,335	48.58	INC	42,805	23.99	43,530
83	Goverdhan	BJP	82,394	48.10	BSP	52,085	30.40	30,309
84	Mathura	BJP	1,37,633	63.03	INC	55,849	25.57	81,784
85	Baldev (SC)	BJP	93,227	46.39	INC	55,381	27.56	37,846
Agra Lok Sabha constituency
86	Etmadpur	BJP	1,43,178	52.18	SP	65,027	23.70	78,151
87	Agra Cantonment	BJP	1,13,161	49.05	SP	75,519	32.73	37,642
88	Agra South	BJP	1,04,342	54.26	SP	62,997	32.76	41,345
89	Agra North	BJP	1,49,922	65.03	SP	46,418	20.13	1,03,504
106	Jalesar (SC)	BJP	86,458	45.21	SP	76,683	40.10	9,775
Fatehpur Sikri Lok Sabha constituency
90	Agra Rural (SC)	BJP	1,10,699	44.07	INC	91,337	36.36	19,362
91	Fatehpur Sikri	BJP	85,695	38.21	INC	65,811	29.35	19,884
92	Kheragarh	INC	95,885	48.50	BJP	74,796	37.83	21,089
93	Fatehabad	BJP	1,00,038	52.04	INC	72,551	37.74	27,487
94	Bah	INC	74,988	45.85	BJP	71,634	43.80	3,354
Firozabad Lok Sabha constituency
95	Tundla (SC)	BJP	1,07,422	46.19	SP	90,226	38.80	17,196
96	Jasrana	SP	1,15,650	50.84	BJP	89,753	39.46	25,897
97	Firozabad	SP	1,19,601	50.36	BJP	1,03,672	43.66	15,929
98	Shikohabad	SP	1,13,575	51.87	BJP	82,714	37.77	30,861
99	Sirsaganj	SP	1,02,809	54.46	BJP	69,385	36.75	33,424
Mainpuri Lok Sabha constituency
107	Mainpuri	SP	1,03,888	52.90	BJP	77,623	39.52	26,265
108	Bhongaon	SP	1,00,256	50.24	BJP	86,203	43.20	14,053
109	Kishni (SC)	SP	1,04,820	54.82	BJP	69,995	36.60	34,825
110	Karhal	SP	1,34,049	59.14	BJP	76,509	33.75	57,540
199	Jaswantnagar	SP	1,53,697	64.59	BJP	65,565	27.55	88,132
Etah Lok Sabha constituency
100	Kasganj	BJP	1,13,678	50.37	SP	90,238	39.98	23,440
101	Amanpur	BJP	86,522	46.41	SP	81,734	43.85	4,788
102	Patiyali	SP	1,12,940	56.46	BJP	69,842	34.92	43,098
104	Etah	SP	98,462	50.48	BJP	82,982	42.51	15,480
105	Marhara	BJP	93,724	46.79	SP	90,889	45.37	2,835
Badaun Lok Sabha constituency
111	Gunnaur	SP	1,22,044	54.64	BJP	82,012	36.72	40,032
112	Bisauli (SC)	BJP	1,07,656	45.38	SP	95,861	40.41	11,795
113	Sahaswan	SP	1,19,055	52.48	BJP	82,950	36.56	36,105
114	Bilsit	BJP	90,753	47.24	SP	70,044	36.46	20,709
115	Badaun	BJP	1,02,952	48.76	SP	87,386	41.38	15,566
Aonla Lok Sabha constituency
116	Shekhupur	SP	1,04,751	46.57	BJP	89,640	39.86	15,111
117	Dataganj	BJP	1,01,306	45.26	SP	98,162	43.86	3,144
122	Faridpur (SC)	SP	96,539	47.56	BJP	86,144	42.44	10,395
123	Bithari Chainpur	SP	1,13,585	46.27	BJP	1,11,774	45.53	1,811
126	Aonla	BJP	86,570	45.26	SP	78,082	43.86	8,488
Bareilly Lok Sabha constituency
119	Meerganj	BJP	1,20,977	54.97	SP	93,943	42.69	27,034
120	Bhojipura	SP	1,31,145	51.60	BJP	1,18,275	46.54	12,870
121	Nawabganj	SP	1,07,183	49.16	BJP	1,06,279	48.74	904
124	Bareilly	BJP	1,24,129	53.24	SP	1,05,900	45.43	18,229
125	Bareilly Cantonment	BJP	95,940	50.21	SP	92,654	48.49	3,286
Pilibhit Lok Sabha constituency
118	Baheri	SP	1,10,485	45.94	BJP	1,08,118	44.95	2,367
127	Pilibhit	BJP	1,20,263	50.84	SP	1,01,969	43.11	18,294
128	Barkhera	BJP	1,39,292	63.32	SP	69,029	31.38	70,263
129	Puranpur (SC)	BJP	1,32,162	53.52	SP	90,498	36.46	41,664
130	Bisalpur	BJP	1,05,364	49.70	SP	74,754	35.26	30,610
Shahjahanpur Lok Sabha constituency
131	Katra	BJP	86,225	46.57	SP	79,841	43.12	6,384
132	Jalalabad	SP	1,03,528	51.07	BJP	84,088	41.48	19,440
133	Tilhar	SP	96,768	47.15	BJP	88,784	43.26	7,984
134	Powayan (SC)	BJP	1,28,751	56.26	SP	72,581	31.72	56,170
135	Shahjahanpur	BJP	96,786	48.03	SP	93,603	46.45	3,183
136	Dadraul	BJP	1,06,866	48.54	SP	88,399	40.15	18,467
Kheri Lok Sabha constituency
137	Palia	BJP	1,04,631	45.12	SP	97,788	42.17	6,843
138	Nighasan	BJP	1,16,230	48.12	SP	98,924	40.95	17,306
139	Gola Gokrannath	SP	1,22,060	49.08	BJP	95,833	38.53	26,227
140	Sri Nagar (SC)	SP	1,12,984	49.41	BJP	88,972	38.91	24,012
142	Lakhimpur	SP	1,23,521	47.69	BJP	1,16,288	44.90	7,233
Dhaurahra Lok Sabha constituency
141	Dhaurahra	BJP	90,977	41.19	SP	84,845	38.41	6,132
143	Kasta (SC)	SP	84,410	40.73	BJP	78,691	37.97	5,719
144	Mohammadi	SP	86,097	37.45	BJP	82,842	36.04	3,255
145	Maholi	BJP	97,131	40.97	SP	96,436	40.68	695
147	Hargaon (SC)	SP	90,862	42.36	BJP	88,932	41.46	1,930
Sitapur Lok Sabha constituency
146	Sitapur	INC	1,09,249	49.53	BJP	92,923	42.13	16,326
148	Laharpur	INC	1,11,261	48.99	BJP	86,813	38.22	24,448
149	Biswan	INC	1,20,093	53.35	BJP	77,562	34.46	42,531
150	Sevata	BJP	99,662	46.03	INC	85,837	39.64	13,825
151	Mahmoodabad	INC	1,04,027	49.17	BJP	84,106	39.76	19,921
Hardoi Lok Sabha constituency
154	Sawaijpur	BJP	1,12,440	48.15	SP	93,303	39.96	19,137
155	Shahabad	SP	98,331	44.29	BJP	92,161	41.51	6,170
156	Hardoi	BJP	1,11,932	48.93	SP	87,864	38.41	24,068
157	Gopamau (SC)	SP	91,771	42.72	BJP	89,087	41.48	2,684
158	Sandi (SC)	SP	86,284	43.53	BJP	80,125	40.42	6,159
Misrikh Lok Sabha constituency
153	Misrikh (SC)	SP	99,782	47.79	BJP	78,617	37.65	21,165
159	Bilgram-Mallanwan	BJP	97,089	44.19	SP	91,552	41.67	5,537
160	Balamau (SC)	BJP	86,408	45.37	SP	79,429	41.70	6,979
161	Sandila	BJP	99,721	51.51	SP	74,117	38.29	25,604
209	Bilhaur (SC)	BJP	1,12,136	47.38	SP	95,277	40.26	16,859
Unnao Lok Sabha constituency
162	Bangarmau	SP	87,206	44.27	BJP	87,204	44.26	2
163	Safipur (SC)	BJP	89,225	46.45	SP	87,174	45.38	2,051
164	Mohan (SC)	BJP	97,112	48.89	SP	86,023	43.31	11,089
165	Unnao	BJP	1,16,302	49.49	SP	1,05,556	44.92	10,746
166	Bhagwantnagar	BJP	1,08,456	46.37	SP	1,04,663	44.75	3,793
167	Purwa	BJP	1,16,533	48.26	SP	1,07,077	44.35	9,456
Mohanlalganj Lok Sabha constituency
152	Sidhauli (SC)	SP	1,36,249	56.49	BJP	80,636	33.43	55,613
168	Malihabad (SC)	SP	1,15,425	48.56	BJP	1,01,229	42.59	14,196
169	Bakshi Ka Talab	BJP	1,50,906	46.51	SP	1,46,683	45.21	4,223
170	Sarojini Nagar	BJP	1,67,123	50.93	SP	1,40,171	42.72	26,952
176	Mohanlalganj (SC)	SP	1,28,032	52.68	BJP	96,303	39.62	31,729
Lucknow Lok Sabha constituency
171	Lucknow West	SP	1,26,295	49.21	BJP	1,20,625	46.99	5,670
172	Lucknow North	BJP	1,41,683	55.74	SP	1,02,493	40.32	39,190
173	Lucknow East	BJP	1,50,403	62.36	SP	79,289	32.87	71,114
174	Lucknow Central	SP	99,426	50.34	BJP	91,842	46.50	7,584
175	Lucknow Cantonment	BJP	1,06,044	57.73	SP	68,800	37.45	37,244
Raebareli Lok Sabha constituency
177	Bachhrawan (SC)	INC	1,35,288	64.78	BJP	62,638	29.99	72,650
179	Harchandpur	INC	1,22,029	61.83	BJP	65,168	33.02	56,861
180	Raebareli	INC	1,56,525	71.17	BJP	53,508	24.33	1,03,017
182	Sareni	INC	1,37,346	65.27	BJP	62,428	29.67	74,918
183	Unchahar	INC	1,34,856	67.38	BJP	52,961	26.46	81,895
Amethi Lok Sabha constituency
178	Tiloi	INC	1,01,405	51.57	BJP	83,287	42.36	18,118
181	Salon (SC)	INC	1,19,370	60.17	BJP	67,052	33.80	52,318
184	Jagdishpur (SC)	INC	1,01,496	49.75	BJP	86,073	42.19	15,423
185	Gauriganj	INC	1,08,426	55.19	BJP	75,048	38.20	33,378
186	Amethi	INC	1,05,983	58.48	BJP	59,294	32.72	46,689
Sultanpur Lok Sabha constituency
187	Isauli	SP	95,817	49.35	BJP	76,886	39.60	18,931
188	Sultanpur	SP	1,01,236	46.77	BJP	85,169	39.34	16,067
189	Sadar	SP	75,984	38.95	BJP	74,838	38.36	1,146
190	Lambhua	SP	89,072	42.91	BJP	77,748	37.46	11,324
191	Kadipur (SC)	BJP	85,218	39.28	SP	80,777	37.24	4,441
Pratapgarh Lok Sabha constituency
244	Rampur Khas	SP	77,657	47.51	BJP	67,511	41.30	10,146
247	Vishwanathganj	BJP	88,151	44.31	SP	84,717	42.58	3,434
248	Pratapgarh	SP	89,439	46.45	BJP	80,370	41.74	9,069
249	Patti	SP	1,02,985	49.92	BJP	67,978	32.95	35,007
250	Raniganj	SP	85,038	46.70	BJP	70,198	38.55	14,840
Farrukhabad Lok Sabha constituency
103	Aliganj	SP	1,13,312	52.21	BJP	91,916	42.35	21,396
192	Kaimganj (SC)	SP	1,17,867	48.93	BJP	1,06,571	44.24	11,296
193	Amritpur	BJP	92,970	51.21	SP	78,214	43.08	14,756
194	Farrukhabad	BJP	1,00,225	50.20	SP	88,715	44.44	11,510
195	Bhojpur	BJP	95,243	49.43	SP	86,377	44.83	8,866
Etawah Lok Sabha constituency
200	Etawah	SP	1,10,332	47.57	BJP	1,07,239	46.23	3,093
201	Bharthana (SC)	SP	1,16,306	49.32	BJP	90,601	38.42	25,705
203	Dibiyapur	SP	91,648	48.47	BJP	74,808	39.56	16,840
204	Auraiya (SC)	SP	88,556	47.91	BJP	74,609	40.36	13,947
207	Sikandra	BJP	83,665	44.28	SP	82,516	43.68	1,149
Kannauj Lok Sabha constituency
196	Chhibramau	SP	1,61,107	56.29	BJP	1,09,631	38.30	51,476
197	Tirwa	SP	1,27,185	53.85	BJP	92,827	39.30	34,358
198	Kannauj (SC)	SP	1,38,567	51.75	BJP	1,04,323	38.96	34,244
202	Bidhuna	SP	1,20,460	53.36	BJP	80,343	35.59	40,117
205	Rasulabad (SC)	SP	92,888	46.82	BJP	83,007	41.84	9,881
Kanpur Lok Sabha constituency
212	Govind Nagar	BJP	1,12,400	58.81	INC	71,560	37.44	40,840
213	Sishamau	INC	87,323	57.77	BJP	60,848	40.25	26,475
214	Arya Nagar	INC	78,878	53.05	BJP	67,539	45.42	11,339
215	Kidwai Nagar	BJP	1,28,302	63.89	INC	68,680	34.20	59,622
216	Kanpur Cantonment	INC	1,15,028	60.45	BJP	71,520	37.59	43,508
Akbarpur Lok Sabha constituency
206	Akbarpur-Raniya	SP	1,08,489	51.99	BJP	79,046	37.87	29,443
210	Bithoor	SP	1,13,626	47.59	BJP	1,03,229	43.24	10,397
211	Kalyanpur	BJP	1,14,672	62.20	SP	60,066	32.58	54,606
217	Maharajpur	BJP	1,42,358	56.33	SP	93,688	37.07	48,670
218	Ghatampur (SC)	SP	93,897	48.07	BJP	74,951	38.37	18,946
Jalaun Lok Sabha constituency
208	Bhognipur	SP	1,06,873	51.91	BJP	75,848	36.84	31,025
219	Madhogarh	SP	1,09,929	46.29	BJP	1,01,339	42.68	8,590
220	Kalpi	SP	1,07,057	48.37	BJP	88,887	40.16	18,170
221	Orai (SC)	SP	1,23,224	48.31	BJP	1,11,395	43.67	11,829
225	Garautha	BJP	97,763	47.17	SP	82,361	39.74	15,402
Jhansi Lok Sabha constituency
222	Babina	BJP	1,10,780	50.34	INC	92,821	42.18	17,959
223	Jhansi Nagar	BJP	1,35,202	54.82	INC	1,03,987	42.16	31,215
224	Mauranipur (SC)	INC	1,27,517	48.85	BJP	1,12,423	43.07	15,094
226	Lalitpur	BJP	1,74,521	53.54	INC	1,23,880	38.00	50,641
227	Mehroni (SC)	BJP	1,56,512	48.14	INC	1,38,795	42.69	17,717
Hamirpur Lok Sabha constituency
228	Hamirpur	SP	1,26,708	48.73	BJP	1,05,644	40.63	21,064
229	Rath (SC)	BJP	1,16,516	45.18	SP	1,15,264	44.69	1,252
230	Mahoba	BJP	93,076	47.36	SP	79,077	40.24	13,999
231	Charkhari	SP	92,438	43.48	BJP	90,593	42.61	1,845
232	Tindwari	BJP	81,544	43.66	SP	76,516	40.96	5,028
Banda Lok Sabha constituency
233	Baberu	SP	91,252	44.54	BJP	61,512	30.02	29,740
234	Naraini (SC)	SP	86,894	40.86	BJP	69,200	32.54	17,694
235	Banda	BJP	77,620	40.92	SP	73,823	38.92	3,797
236	Chitrakoot	SP	91,569	39.04	BSP	64,780	27.62	26,789
237	Manikpur	SP	62,480	31.06	BSP	62,397	31.02	83
Fatehpur Lok Sabha constituency
238	Jahanabad	SP	89,210	48.30	BJP	81,050	43.89	8,160
239	Bindki	SP	86,163	46.68	BJP	77,002	41.71	9,161
240	Fatehpur	SP	92,103	44.87	BJP	88,794	43.26	3,309
241	Ayah Shah	BJP	67,820	43.95	SP	63,290	41.01	4,530
242	Husainganj	SP	87,527	48.59	BJP	67,250	37.33	20,277
243	Khaga (SC)	BJP	84,333	42.92	SP	81,573	41.51	2,760
Kaushambi Lok Sabha constituency
245	Babaganj (SC)	SP	82,544	51.82	BJP	61,852	38.83	20,692
246	Kunda	SP	1,01,742	56.22	BJP	65,555	36.22	36,187
251	Sirathu	SP	1,02,495	49.27	BJP	85,745	41.22	16,750
252	Manjhanpur (SC)	SP	1,21,985	49.53	BJP	99,083	40.23	22,902
253	Chail	SP	1,00,409	47.00	BJP	92,907	43.49	7,482
Phulpur Lok Sabha constituency
254	Phaphamau	SP	88,999	45.46	BJP	80,166	40.94	8,833
255	Soraon (SC)	SP	96,312	45.13	BJP	83,376	39.07	12,936
256	Phulpur	SP	1,07,921	46.31	BJP	89,984	38.61	17,937
261	Allahabad West	BJP	1,06,414	51.00	SP	91,629	43.91	14,785
262	Allahabad North	BJP	91,440	56.88	SP	61,735	38.40	29,705
Allahabad Lok Sabha constituency
259	Meja	INC	87,177	49.76	BJP	70,034	39.97	17,143
260	Karachhana	INC	99,747	50.21	BJP	80,501	40.52	19,246
263	Allahabad South	BJP	86,312	51.18	INC	79,381	47.07	6,931
264	Bara (SC)	INC	96,466	48.87	BJP	79,442	40.24	17,024
265	Koraon (SC)	INC	98,329	47.90	BJP	86,370	42.07	11,959
Barabanki Lok Sabha constituency
266	Kursi	INC	1,58,850	55.24	BJP	1,11,216	38.67	47,634
267	Ram Nagar	INC	1,26,047	54.17	BJP	95,999	41.26	30,048
268	Barabanki	INC	1,57,696	59.12	BJP	94,370	35.38	63,326
269	Zaidpur (SC)	INC	1,62,578	58.44	BJP	1,03,445	37.18	59,133
272	Haidergarh (SC)	INC	1,13,357	50.79	BJP	98,422	44.09	14,935
Faizabad Lok Sabha constituency
270	Dariyabad	SP	1,31,277	49.32	BJP	1,21,183	45.53	10,094
271	Rudauli	SP	1,04,113	49.32	BJP	92,410	43.77	11,703
273	Milkipur (SC)	SP	95,612	45.89	BJP	87,879	42.18	7,733
274	Bikapur	SP	1,22,543	52.45	BJP	92,859	39.75	29,684
275	Ayodhya	BJP	1,04,671	47.60	SP	1,00,004	45.48	4,667
Ambedkar Nagar Lok Sabha constituency
276	Goshainganj	SP	1,07,176	46.32	BJP	89,714	38.77	17,462
277	Katehari	SP	1,07,840	43.44	BJP	90,768	36.57	17,072
278	Tanda	SP	1,17,937	53.39	BJP	64,231	29.08	53,706
280	Jalalpur	SP	1,12,106	43.67	BJP	84,749	33.01	27,357
281	Akbarpur	SP	98,662	45.36	BJP	77,389	35.58	21,273
Bahraich Lok Sabha constituency
282	Balha (SC)	BJP	1,08,086	49.72	SP	90,749	41.75	17,337
283	Nanpara	BJP	96,481	47.92	SP	89,098	44.25	7,383
284	Matera	SP	98,811	49.36	BJP	84,208	42.07	14,603
285	Mahasi	BJP	1,26,760	59.68	SP	67,819	31.93	58,941
286	Bahraich	SP	1,07,977	48.01	BJP	1,03,040	45.82	4,937
Kaiserganj Lok Sabha constituency
287	Payagpur	BJP	1,15,323	51.55	SP	91,544	40.92	23,779
288	Kaiserganj	SP	1,07,372	48.17	BJP	1,00,586	45.13	6,786
297	Katra Bazar	BJP	1,21,621	53.77	SP	90,226	39.89	31,395
298	Colonelganj	BJP	94,238	52.31	SP	75,119	41.69	19,119
299	Tarabganj	BJP	1,38,668	66.71	SP	57,751	27.78	80,917
Shravasti Lok Sabha constituency
289	Bhinga	SP	1,06,781	47.51	BJP	89,780	39.94	17,001
290	Shravasti	SP	1,23,077	49.51	BJP	1,00,104	40.27	22,973
291	Tulsipur	SP	94,375	50.07	BJP	78,769	41.79	15,606
292	Gainsari	SP	94,346	50.69	BJP	72,805	39.12	21,541
294	Balrampur (SC)	BJP	92,734	46.82	SP	92,175	46.54	559
Gonda Lok Sabha constituency
293	Utraula	SP	96,203	49.42	BJP	89,018	45.73	7,185
295	Mehnaun	BJP	1,06,112	50.03	SP	95,358	44.96	10,754
296	Gonda	BJP	94,201	50.17	SP	85,697	45.64	8,504
300	Mankapur (SC)	BJP	1,04,279	57.43	SP	67,751	37.31	36,528
301	Gaura	SP	82,354	46.92	BJP	80,081	45.62	2,273
Domariyaganj Lok Sabha constituency
302	Shohratgarh	BJP	88,446	46.08	SP	76,129	39.67	12,317
303	Kapilvastu (SC)	BJP	1,21,122	47.62	SP	1,02,306	40.22	18,816
304	Bansi	BJP	91,817	47.25	SP	75,979	39.10	15,838
305	Itwa	SP	75,459	44.37	BJP	73,003	42.93	2,456
306	Domariyaganj	SP	89,037	43.31	BJP	88,226	42.91	811
Basti Lok Sabha constituency
307	Harraiya	BJP	99,133	45.86	SP	96,329	44.56	2,804
308	Kaptanganj	SP	1,09,245	51.47	BJP	76,806	36.19	32,439
309	Rudhauli	SP	1,15,555	49.44	BJP	91,359	39.09	24,196
310	Basti Sadar	SP	1,00,020	48.13	BJP	80,271	38.62	19,749
311	Mahadewa (SC)	SP	1,02,338	49.32	BJP	77,035	37.12	25,303
Sant Kabir Nagar Lok Sabha constituency
279	Alapur (SC)	SP	91,565	44.36	BJP	69,668	33.75	21,897
312	Menhdawal	SP	1,11,914	46.58	BJP	98,194	40.87	13,720
313	Khalilabad	SP	1,29,787	53.89	BJP	77,180	32.05	52,607
314	Dhanghata (SC)	SP	94,016	44.35	BJP	79,788	37.63	14,228
325	Khajani (SC)	BJP	80,781	43.13	SP	70,206	37.48	10,575
Maharajganj Lok Sabha constituency
315	Pharenda	INC	1,04,736	50.18	BJP	91,579	43.88	13,157
316	Nautanwa	BJP	1,05,907	47.98	INC	1,02,642	46.49	3,265
317	Siswa	BJP	1,37,732	53.42	INC	1,08,013	41.89	29,719
318	Maharajganj (SC)	BJP	1,26,286	47.79	INC	1,26,118	47.73	168
319	Paniyara	BJP	1,28,983	50.14	INC	1,13,536	44.13	15,447
Gorakhpur Lok Sabha constituency
320	Caimpiyarganj	BJP	1,07,787	49.62	SP	88,861	40.90	18,926
321	Pipraich	BJP	1,30,314	51.89	SP	1,01,531	40.43	28,783
322	Gorakhpur Urban	BJP	1,33,822	58.58	SP	86,208	37.74	47,614
323	Gorakhpur Rural	BJP	1,13,300	47.74	SP	1,10,208	46.44	3,092
324	Sahajanwa	BJP	99,289	45.70	SP	93,980	43.26	5,309
Kushinagar Lok Sabha constituency
329	Khadda	SP	90,127	42.88	BJP	86,934	41.36	3,193
330	Padrauna	BJP	1,02,770	45.04	SP	91,953	40.29	10,817
333	Kushinagar	BJP	1,04,217	48.33	SP	90,383	41.92	13,834
334	Hata	BJP	1,13,542	53.10	SP	80,856	37.81	32,686
335	Ramkola (SC)	BJP	1,08,543	51.22	SP	80,891	38.17	27,652
Deoria Lok Sabha constituency
331	Tamkuhi Raj	BJP	1,17,277	52.27	INC	88,425	39.41	28,852
332	Fazilnagar	BJP	1,11,530	50.02	INC	97,099	43.55	14,431
337	Deoria	BJP	96,372	49.78	INC	87,779	45.34	8,593
338	Pathardeva	INC	97,035	48.74	BJP	91,274	45.85	5,761
339	Rampur Karkhana	INC	97,608	48.70	BJP	87,056	43.43	10,552
Bansgaon Lok Sabha constituency
326	Chauri-Chaura	BJP	99,531	50.07	INC	83,258	41.88	16,273
327	Bansgaon (SC)	INC	82,969	46.52	BJP	73,724	41.34	9,245
328	Chillupar	INC	98,319	46.35	BJP	87,943	41.46	10,376
336	Rudrapur	BJP	90,343	50.65	INC	75,707	42.44	14,636
342	Barhaj	INC	83,619	48.02	BJP	75,987	43.64	7,632
Lalganj Lok Sabha constituency
343	Atraulia	SP	89,184	40.42	BJP	81,664	37.02	7,520
348	Nizamabad	SP	90,800	49.59	BJP	49,242	26.89	41,558
349	Phoolpur Pawai	SP	86,743	46.36	BJP	55,343	29.58	31,400
350	Didarganj	SP	83,294	42.74	BJP	66,397	34.07	16,897
351	Lalganj (SC)	SP	87,546	40.95	BJP	71,460	33.43	16,086
Azamgarh Lok Sabha constituency
344	Gopalpur	SP	99,606	48.87	BJP	64,574	31.68	35,032
345	Sagri	SP	88,409	46.18	BJP	64,812	33.86	23,597
346	Mubarakpur	SP	1,11,592	53.00	BJP	57,661	27.39	53,931
347	Azamgarh	SP	1,08,807	48.06	BJP	84,013	37.11	24,794
352	Mehnagar (SC)	SP	96,423	44.48	BJP	74,665	34.44	21,758
Ghosi Lok Sabha constituency
353	Madhuban	SP	88,461	39.90	SBSP	70,680	31.88	17,781
354	Ghosi	SP	1,10,354	43.31	SBSP	75,219	30.20	35,135
355	Muhammadabad-Gohna (SC)	SP	95,473	42.90	SBSP	55,192	24.80	40,281
356	Mau	SP	1,35,665	51.18	SBSP	55,192	20.82	80,473
358	Rasara	SP	71,454	37.79	SBSP	66,337	35.08	5,117
Salempur Lok Sabha constituency
340	Bhatpar Rani	BJP	91,673	49.06	SP	77,614	41.53	14,059
341	Salempur (SC)	SP	79,791	47.10	BJP	71,085	41.96	8,706
357	Belthara Road (SC)	SP	83,390	43.13	BJP	73,690	38.12	9,700
359	Sikanderpur	SP	75,781	45.32	BJP	68,401	40.91	7,380
362	Bansdih	BJP	95,640	48.56	SP	87,040	44.20	8,600
Ballia Lok Sabha constituency
360	Phephana	SP	80,263	45.72	BJP	76,865	43.78	3,398
361	Ballia Nagar	BJP	92,299	48.77	SP	86,617	45.77	5,682
363	Bairia	SP	79,810	48.06	BJP	73,562	44.30	6,248
377	Zahoorabad	SP	1,05,618	44.21	BJP	91,431	38.27	14,187
378	Mohammadabad	SP	1,12,165	48.29	BJP	87,120	37.51	25,045
Jaunpur Lok Sabha constituency
364	Badlapur	SP	85,513	43.46	BJP	74,842	38.04	10,671
365	Shahganj	SP	1,03,006	44.25	BJP	85,236	36.61	17,770
366	Jaunpur	SP	1,16,218	48.06	BJP	94,014	38.88	22,204
367	Malhani	SP	1,05,326	48.51	BJP	73,638	33.91	31,688
368	Mungra Badshahpur	SP	96,013	46.04	BJP	80,782	38.73	15,231
Machhlishahr Lok Sabha constituency
369	Machhlishahr (SC)	SP	98,190	46.37	BJP	74,456	35.16	23,734
370	Mariyahu	BJP	78,112	41.59	SP	77,026	41.01	1,086
371	Zafrabad	SP	92,721	43.16	BJP	84,787	39.46	7,934
372	Kerakat (SC)	SP	97,613	42.04	BJP	84,263	36.29	13,350
384	Pindra	BJP	92,876	44.15	SP	84,011	39.93	8,865
Ghazipur Lok Sabha constituency
373	Jakhanian (SC)	SP	1,15,706	44.85	BJP	89,358	34.64	26,348
374	Saidpur (SC)	SP	1,11,087	48.15	BJP	74,421	32.26	36,666
375	Ghazipur Sadar	SP	1,01,026	46.37	BJP	89,797	41.21	11,229
376	Jangipur	SP	1,04,459	47.06	BJP	77,125	34.75	27,334
379	Zamania	SP	1,05,506	47.85	BJP	82,817	37.56	22,689
Chandauli Lok Sabha constituency
380	Mughalsarai	SP	1,08,356	46.61	BJP	95,015	40.87	13,341
381	Sakaldiha	SP	89,757	44.73	BJP	68,703	34.23	21,054
382	Saiyadraja	SP	78,684	39.59	BJP	77,343	38.92	1,341
385	Ajagara (SC)	SP	97,608	41.04	BJP	97,381	40.94	227
386	Shivpur	BJP	1,13,360	46.49	SP	98,523	40.41	14,837
Varanasi Lok Sabha constituency
387	Rohaniya	BJP	1,27,508	51.83	INC	1,01,225	41.15	26,283
388	Varanasi North	BJP	1,31,241	54.59	INC	1,01,731	42.29	29,510
389	Varanasi South	BJP	97,878	53.62	INC	81,732	44.78	16,146
390	Varanasi Cantonment	BJP	1,45,922	60.68	INC	87,645	36.44	58,277
391	Sevapuri	BJP	1,08,890	50.05	INC	86,751	39.88	22,139
Bhadohi Lok Sabha constituency
257	Pratappur	AITC	93,188	43.17	BJP	85,330	39.53	7,858
258	Handia	BJP	88,235	43.32	AITC	77,286	37.95	10,949
392	Bhadohi	BJP	95,574	40.24	AITC	92,054	38.75	3,520
393	Gyanpur	BJP	97,450	46.52	AITC	70,787	33.79	26,663
394	Aurai (SC)	BJP	92,288	42.88	AITC	80,816	37.55	11,472
Mirzapur Lok Sabha constituency
395	Chhanbey (SC)	AD(S)	85,460	40.23	SP	77,076	36.28	8,384
396	Mirzapur	AD(S)	1,00,043	47.40	SP	83,916	39.76	16,127
397	Majhawan	AD(S)	94,061	39.48	SP	92,299	38.74	1,762
398	Chunar	AD(S)	98,783	47.08	SP	80,417	38.32	18,366
399	Marihan	SP	99,578	42.86	AD(S)	92,519	39.82	7,059
Robertsganj Lok Sabha constituency
383	Chakia (SC)	SP	1,09,026	46.09	AD(S)	77,419	32.73	31,607
400	Ghorawal	SP	1,08,042	45.67	AD(S)	79,639	33.66	28,403
401	Robertsganj	SP	89,341	46.09	AD(S)	68,807	35.49	20,534
402	Obra (ST)	SP	60,623	41.50	AD(S)	55,963	38.31	4,660
403	Duddhi (ST)	SP	98,208	50.26	AD(S)	54,516	27.90	43,692

== See also ==
- 2024 Indian general election in Andaman and Nicobar Islands
- 2024 Indian general election in Uttarakhand
- 2024 Indian general election in West Bengal
