= Dhaurahra =

Dhaurhara may refer to:

== Places ==
- Dhaurahra, Lucknow, a village in Lucknow district of Uttar Pradesh, India
- Dhaurahra, Raebareli, a village in Raebareli district of Uttar Pradesh, India
- Dhaurehra, a town in Lakhimpur Kheri district of Uttar Pradesh, India
  - Dhaurahra (Assembly constituency)
  - Dhaurahra (Lok Sabha constituency)

== See also ==
- Dharhara (disambiguation)
- Dharahara
