= Dhaurahra Lok Sabha constituency =

Constituency of the Indian parliament in Uttar Pradesh

Coordinates: 27.36°N 81.04°E

Dhaurahra UP-29
- Lok Sabha constituency
- Interactive Map Outlining Dhaurahra Lok Sabha constituency

Constituency details
- Country: India
- Region: North India
- State: Uttar Pradesh
- Assembly constituencies: Dhaurahra; Kasta; Mohammdi; Maholi; Hargaon
- Established: 2008-present
- Reservation: None

Member of Parliament
- 18th Lok Sabha
- Incumbent Anand Bhadauriya
- Party: Samajwadi Party
- Elected year: 2024

Dhaurahra Lok Sabha constituency is one of the 80 Lok Sabha (parliamentary) constituencies in Uttar Pradesh state in northern India. This constituency, spread over Lakhimpur Kheri and Sitapur districts came into existence in 2008 as a part of the implementation of delimitation of parliamentary constituencies based on the recommendations of the Delimitation Commission of India constituted in 2002.

== Assembly segments ==
Presently, Dhaurahra Lok Sabha constituency comprises five Vidhan Sabha (legislative assembly) segments. These are:

No	Name	District	Member	Party	2024 Lead
141	Dhaurahra	Lakhimpur Kheri	Vinod Shankar Avasthi	BJP	BJP
143	Kasta (SC)	Lakhimpur Kheri	Saurabh Singh	BJP	SP
144	Mohammdi	Lakhimpur Kheri	Lokendra Pratap Singh	BJP	SP
145	Maholi	Sitapur	Shashank Trivedi	BJP	BJP
147	Hargaon (SC)	Sitapur	Suresh Rahi	BJP	SP

== Members of Parliament ==
Year	Member	Party
2009	Jitin Prasada	Indian National Congress
2014	Rekha Verma	Bharatiya Janata Party
2019	Rekha Verma	Bharatiya Janata Party
2024	Anand Bhadauriya	Samajwadi Party

== Election results ==
=== General Election 2024 ===
2024 Indian general elections: Dhaurahra
Party	Candidate	Votes	%	±%
SP	Anand Bhadauriya	443,743	39.91	▲39.91
BJP	Rekha Verma	4,39,294	39.51	▼8.70
BSP	Shyam Kishore Awasthi	1,85,474	16.68	▼16.44
NOTA	None of the above	7,144	0.64	▼0.38
Majority		4,449	0.40	▼14.09
Turnout		11,11,847	64.47	▼0.22
SP gain from BJP		Swing		

=== 2019 ===
2019 Indian general elections: Dhaurahra
Party	Candidate	Votes	%	±%
BJP	Rekha Verma	512,905	48.21	
BSP	Arshad Ilyas Siddiqui	3,52,294	33.12	
INC	Jitin Prasada	1,62,856	15.31	
PSP(L)	Malkhan Singh Rajpoot	4,288	0.4	
Independent	Reetu Verma(Didi)	4,689	0.44	
NOTA	None of the above	10,798	1.02	
Majority		1,60,611	15.09	
Turnout		10,63,953	64.69	
BJP hold		Swing		

=== 2014 ===
2014 Indian general elections: Dhaurahra
Party	Candidate	Votes	%	±%
BJP	Rekha Verma	360,357	33.99	+30.64
BSP	Daud Ahmad	2,34,682	22.13	−5.10
SP	Anand Bhadauriya	2,34,032	22.07	+8.53
INC	Jitin Prasada	1,70,994	16.13	−35.39
AITC	Lekhraj	12,776	1.20	
Majority		1,25,675	11.85	
Turnout		10,60,274	68.05	+8.25
BJP gain from INC		Swing		

=== 2009 ===
2009 Indian general elections: Dhaurahra
Party	Candidate	Votes	%	±%
INC	Jitin Prasada	391,391	51.5	
BSP	Rajesh Verma	206,882	27.2	
SP	Om Prakash	102,898	13.5	
BJP	Raghvendra Singh	25,407	3.3	
Independent	Ram Singh	13,167	1.7	
CPI(ML)L	Arjun Lal	4,891	0.6	
Majority		184,509	24.3	
Turnout		7,59,548	59.8	
INC win (new seat)				

== See also ==
- Lakhimpur Kheri district
- List of constituencies of the Lok Sabha
