= Gauria Kalan =

Village in Uttar Pradesh, India

Gauria Kalan Gauria Kalān
- Village
- Location in Uttar Pradesh, India Gauria Kalan (India)
- Coordinates: 26.80785°N 81.1449°E
- Country: India
- State: Uttar Pradesh
- District: Lucknow

Area
  - Total: 5.604 km^{2} (2.164 sq mi)
- Elevation: 114 m (374 ft)

Population (2011)
  - Total: 3,963
  - Density: 707.2/km^{2} (1,832/sq mi)

Languages
  - Official: Hindi
- Time zone: UTC+5:30 (IST)

Gauria Kalan is a village in Gosainganj block of Lucknow district, Uttar Pradesh, India. As of 2011, its population is 3,963, in 717 households. It is the seat of a gram panchayat.

== History ==
Gauria Kalan was historically the seat of the Gauria Kalan taluqdari estate, which was held by a family of Siddiqui Sheikhs. The family's ancestor, Shah Rafi-ud-Din, came from Delhi at the time of Babur. His grandson, Sheikh Tahir, founded Tahirpur and served as qanungo of the pargana of Amethi, and he was the one who added Gauria Kalan to the estate. His brothers were ancestors of related estates at Mahmudabad and Dhaurahra respectively. At the turn of the 20th century, the Gauria Kalan taluqdars held two estates (the other being Nizampur), consisting of six villages and two pattis. The head of the family was Majid Husain, who held the estate along with his brothers Ashraf Husain, Muhammad Ali, and Ahmad Ali.
