= Ramhet Bharti =

Indian politician

MLA, 16th Legislative Assembly
- Incumbent
- Assumed office Mar 2012
- Preceded by: Himself
- Constituency: Hargaon

MLA, 15th Legislative Assembly
- In office May 2007 – Mar 2012
- Preceded by: Himself
- Succeeded by: Himself
- Constituency: Hargaon

MLA, 14th Legislative Assembly
- In office Feb 2002 – May 2007
- Preceded by: Ramesh Rahi
- Succeeded by: Himself
- Constituency: Hargaon

Personal details
- Born: 20 July 1955 (age 71) Sitapur district
- Party: Bahujan Samaj Party
- Spouse: Usha Bharti (wife)
- Children: 2 sons & 2 daughters
- Parent: Mullu (father)
- Education: Shia P.G. College
- Profession: Politician, farmer & lawyer

Ramhet Bharti is an Indian politician and a member of the 16th Legislative Assembly in India. He represents the Hargaon constituency of Uttar Pradesh and is a member of the Bahujan Samaj Party political party.

== Early life and education ==
Ramhet Bharti was born in Sitapur district. He attended the Shia P.G. College and attained Bachelor of Laws degree. Bharti belongs to the scheduled caste category.

== Political career ==
Ramhet Bharti has been a MLA for three terms. He represented the Hargaon constituency and is a member of the Bahujan Samaj Party political party.

He lost his seat in the 2017 Uttar Pradesh Assembly election to Suresh Rahi of the Bharatiya Janata Party.

== Posts held ==
#	From	To	Position	Comments
01	2012	2017	Member, 16th Legislative Assembly	
02	2007	2012	Member, 15th Legislative Assembly	
03	2002	2007	Member, 14th Legislative Assembly	

== See also ==
- Hargaon (Assembly constituency)
- Sixteenth Legislative Assembly of Uttar Pradesh
- Uttar Pradesh Legislative Assembly
