= Vinod Shankar Avasthi =

Indian politician

Member of the Uttar Pradesh Legislative Assembly
- Incumbent
- Assumed office March 2022
- Constituency: Dhaurahra

Personal details
- Born: 15 November 1959 (age 66) Dhaurehra, India
- Party: Bhartiya Janta Party
- Parent: Ram Shankar Awasthi (father)
- Occupation: Politician

Vinod Shankar Avasthi is an Indian politician, teacher, and a member of the Bhartiya Janta Party. He is a member of the 18th Uttar Pradesh Assembly from the Dhaurahra Assembly constituency.

== Early life ==
Vinod Shankar Avasthi was born on 15 November 1959 in Dhaurehra to Ram Shankar Awasthi.

== Posts held ==
#	From	To	Position	Comments
01	2022	Incumbent	Member, 18th Uttar Pradesh Assembly	
