= Rekha Verma (born 1973) =

Indian politician

Vice President of Bharatiya Janata Party
- Incumbent
- Assumed office 11 January 2019
- President: J. P. Nadda

Member of Parliament, Lok Sabha
- In office 1 September 2014 – 4 June 2024
- Preceded by: Jitin Prasada
- Succeeded by: Anand Bhadauriya
- Constituency: Dhaurahra

Personal details
- Born: 20 May 1973 (age 52) Kanpur, Uttar Pradesh
- Party: Bhartiya Janta Party
- Spouse: Shri Arun Kumar Verma
- Occupation: Businessperson
- As of 17 December, 2016

Rekha Verma (born 20 May 1973) is an Indian politician from Uttar Pradesh, India. She is a National Vice President of the BJP from 2019. She was a two time Member of Parliament from Dhaurahra Lok Sabha constituency. She lost the 2024 Indian general election in Uttar Pradesh.

== Early life and education ==
Verma was born in Kanpur, Uttar Pradesh to Devnarayan Katiyar and Urmila Katiyar. Her husband Arun Kumar Verma died in 2013 and she joined BJP. She studied till intermediate.

== Career ==
Verma was elected to the Lok Sabha, the lower house of the Parliament of India from Dhaurahra Seat, Uttar Pradesh as a member of the Bharatiya Janata Party in 2014 and 2019. In the 2014 Indian general election in Uttar Pradesh, she polled 3,60,357 votes and defeated Daud of Bahujan Samaj Party who got 2,34,682 votes. She won by a margin of 1,25,675 votes. In the 2019 Indian general election in Uttar Pradesh, she polled 5,12,905 votes and defeated Arshad Ahmed Siddiqui of Bahujan Samaj Party by a margin of 1,60,611 votes. In the 2024 Indian general election in Uttar Pradesh, she lost to Anand Bhadauriya of Samajwadi Party by a narrow margin of 4,449 votes.
