= Anoop Kumar Gupta =

Indian politician

Member of the Uttar Pradesh Legislative Assembly
- In office 2012–2017
- Preceded by: None
- Succeeded by: Shashank Trivedi
- Constituency: Maholi

Personal details
- Born: 3 August 1968 (age 58) Sitapur district
- Party: Samajwadi Party
- Spouse: Babita Gupta (wife)
- Children: 1 son and 2 daughters
- Parent: Om Prakash Gupta (father)
- Relatives: Sandhya Gupta (Twin Sister); Sadhna Vaish (Sister); Ashish Gupta (Brother)
- Education: R.M.P. Snatkottar Mahavidyalaya
- Profession: Politician, farmer & businessperson

Anoop Kumar Gupta is an Indian politician and was a member of the 16th Legislative Assembly in India. He used to represent the Maholi constituency of Uttar Pradesh and is a member of the Samajwadi Party political party.

== Early life and education ==
Anoop Kumar Gupta is the son of Om Prakash Gupta and was born in Sitapur district. He attended the R.M.P. Snatkottar Mahavidyalaya and is a graduate.

== Political career and business ==
Anoop Kumar Gupta has been a MLA for one term each. He represented the Maholi constituency and Mishrikh and is a member of the Samajwadi Party political party.

== Posts held ==
From	To	Position
2012	2017	Member, of the Uttar Pradesh Legislative Assembly

== See also ==
- Maholi (Assembly constituency)
- Sixteenth Legislative Assembly of Uttar Pradesh
- Uttar Pradesh Legislative Assembly
