= Anand Bhadauriya =

Indian politician

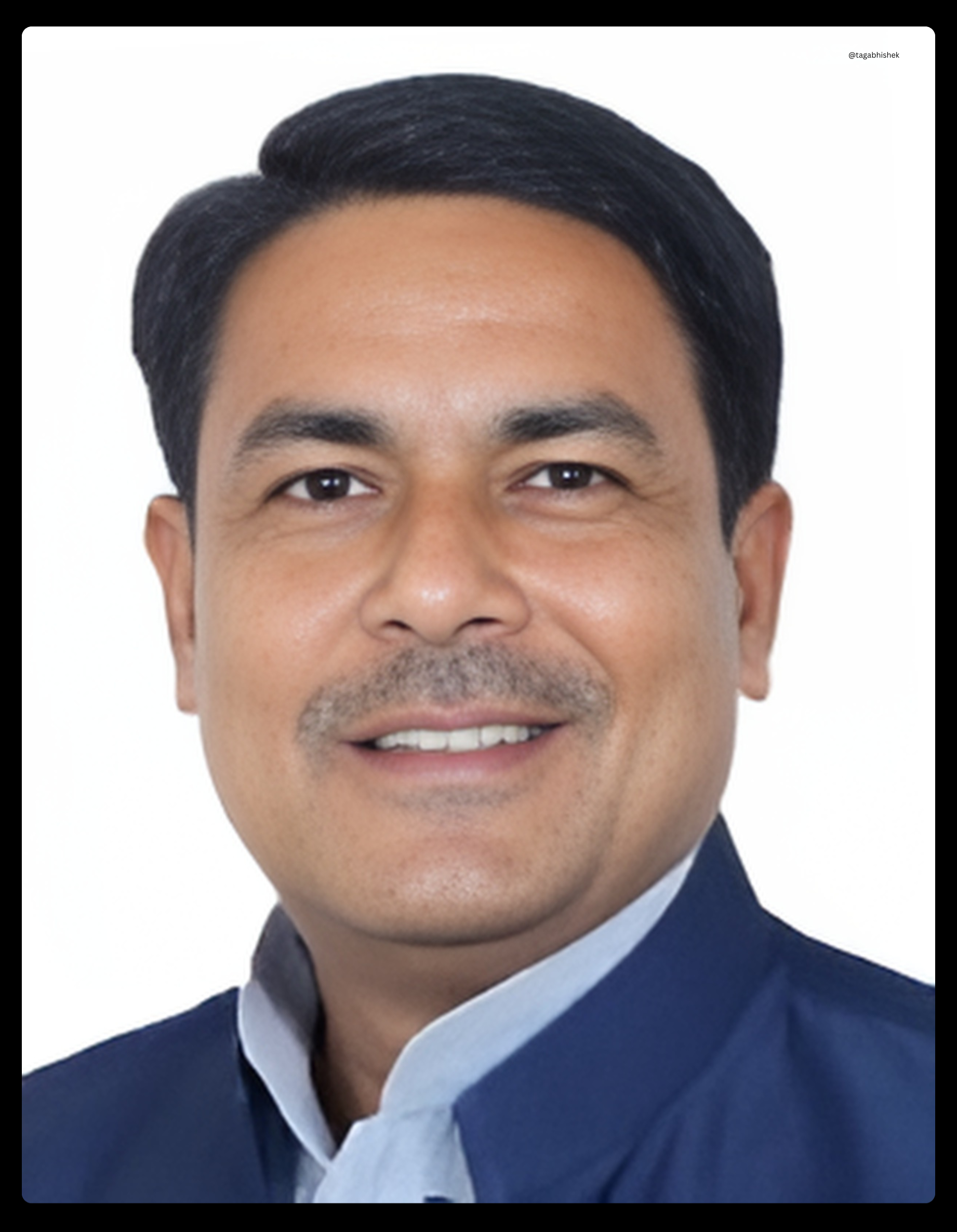

Member of Parliament, Lok Sabha
- Incumbent
- Assumed office 4 June 2024
- Preceded by: Rekha Verma
- Constituency: Dhaurahra
- Majority: 4,449

Member of Uttar Pradesh Legislative Council
- In office 12 April 2016 – 11 April 2022
- Preceded by: Rakesh Singh
- Succeeded by: Pawan Singh Chauhan
- Constituency: Sitapur Local Authorities

Personal details
- Born: 13 April 1978 (age 48) Bahraich, Uttar Pradesh, India
- Party: Samajwadi Party
- Spouse: Archana Singh
- Education: Master of Arts
- Alma mater: Lucknow University, Dr. Shakuntala Misra National Rehabilitation University

Anand Bhadauriya (born 13 April 1978) is an Indian politician from the Samajwadi Party and the Member of Parliament representing the Dhaurahra Lok Sabha constituency. He was a member of the Uttar Pradesh Legislative Council between 2016 and 2022, elected from the local authorities constituency of Sitapur.

== Personal life and education ==
Bhadauria is the son of Lal Bahadur Singh and Rama Singh. He is married to Archana Singh and has a son and a daughter. Bhadauria earned his B.Sc. degree from Lucknow University in 1999 and his M.A. degree in Journalism from the same in 2001. He also earned a Master of Arts (MA) in Hindi from Dr. Shakuntala Misra National Rehabilitation University in Lucknow.

== Political career ==
Bhadauria currently serves as the Member of Parliament for the Dhaurahra constituency, having been elected in June 2024. Previously, he was a member of the Uttar Pradesh Legislative Council from 2016 to 2022. Bhadauriya has also held leadership roles within the Samajwadi Party, including serving as the state and national president of Lohiya Vahini, the party's youth wing.
