= Bala Prasad Awasthi =

Indian politician

MLA, 16th Uttar Pradesh Legislative Assembly
- Incumbent
- Assumed office Mar 2012
- Preceded by: Krishna Raj
- Constituency: Mohammdi

MLA, 15th Uttar Pradesh Legislative Assembly
- In office May 2007 – Mar 2012
- Preceded by: Yeshpal Chaudary
- Succeeded by: Shamsher Bahadur
- Constituency: Dhaurahra

MLA, 11th Uttar Pradesh Legislative Assembly
- In office Jun 1991 – Dec 1992
- Preceded by: Saraswati Pratap Singh
- Succeeded by: Yeshpal Chaudary
- Constituency: Dhaurahra

Personal details
- Born: 20 June 1950 (age 76) Lakhimpur Kheri district
- Party: Bharatiya Janta Party (2022-present, 2016-2022)
- Other political affiliations: Bahujan Samaj Party (till 2016); Samajwadi Party (2022)
- Spouse: Krishna Awasthi (wife)
- Children: 3 sons & 3 daughters
- Parent: Puttu Lal Awasthi (father)
- Education: University of Lucknow
- Profession: Politician & farmer

Bala Prasad Awasthi is an Indian politician and a member of the 16th Legislative Assembly in India. He represented the Mohammdi constituency of Uttar Pradesh and is a member of the Bhartiya Janta Party political party.

== Early life and education ==
Awasthi was born in Lakhimpur Kheri district. He attended the University of Lucknow and attained Bachelor of Laws degree.

== Political career ==
Bala Prasad Awasthi has been a MLA for four terms. He represents the Mohammdi constituency and is a member of the Bharatiya Janata Party. Prasad was earlier a member of the Bahujan Samaj Party, and defected to the BJP in August 2016. He briefly joined the Samajwadi Party in 2022 and returned to the BJP after 18 days.

== Posts held ==
#	From	To	Position	Comments
01	2017	2022	Member, 17th Legislative Assembly	Member of BJP
02	2012	2017	Member, 16th Legislative Assembly	Member of BSP
03	2007	2012	Member, 15th Legislative Assembly	Member of BSP
04	1991	1992	Member, 11th Legislative Assembly	Member of BJP

== See also ==
- Dhaurahra (Assembly constituency)
- Mohammdi (Assembly constituency)
- Sixteenth Legislative Assembly of Uttar Pradesh
- Uttar Pradesh Legislative Assembly
