= Lokendra Pratap Singh =

Member of Uttar Pradesh Legislative Assembly

Member of the Uttar Pradesh Legislative Assembly
- Incumbent
- Assumed office March 2017
- Preceded by: Awasthi Bala Prasad
- Constituency: Mohammdi

Personal details
- Born: 15 June 1962 (age 63) Mohammadi, Uttar Pradesh
- Party: Bharatiya Janata Party
- Education: Bachelor of Laws
- Alma mater: University of Lucknow
- Occupation: Politician, journalist

Lokendra Pratap Singh is an Indian politician, lawyer, and journalist. He is a member of the Bharatiya Janata Party, currently serving as a member of the 18th Uttar Pradesh Assembly, representing the Mohammdi Assembly constituency of Lakhimpur Kheri.

== Early life ==
Lokendra Pratap Singh was born on 15 June 1962 in Mohammadi, Uttar Pradesh, to a Hindi family of Shiv Mangal Singh. He married Pushpa Singh on 28 February 1985, and they have two children.

== Education ==
Lokendra Pratap Singh completed his graduation with a Bachelor of Laws at the University of Lucknow in 1986.

== Posts held ==
#	From	To	Position	Comments
01	2017	Incumbent	Member, Uttar Pradesh Legislative Assembly	
