= Sunil Kumar Lala =

Indian politician

Sunil Kumar Lala सुनील कुमार लाला

MLA, 16th Legislative Assembly
- In office Mar 2012 – Mar 2017
- Preceded by: None
- Succeeded by: Saurabh Singh
- Constituency: Kasta

Personal details
- Born: 7 August 1980 (age 46) Lakhimpur Kheri district
- Party: Samajwadi Party
- Spouse: Anita Devi (wife)
- Parent: Itwari Lal Bhargav (father)
- Education: Adarsh Inter College
- Profession: Politician & farmer

Sunil Kumar Lala (Hindi: सुनील कुमार लाला) is an Indian politician and a member of the 16th Legislative Assembly in India. He represents the Kasta constituency of Uttar Pradesh and is a member of the Samajwadi Party political party.

== Early life and education ==
Sunil Kumar Lala was born in Lakhimpur Kheri district. He attended the Adarsh Inter College and is educated up to the eighth grade.

== Political career ==
Sunil Kumar Lala has been a MLA for one term. He represented the Kasta constituency and is a member of the Samajwadi Party political party.

He lost his seat in the 2017 Uttar Pradesh Assembly election to Saurabh Singh of the Bharatiya Janata Party.

== Posts held ==
#	From	To	Position	Comments
01	2012	2017	Member, 16th Legislative Assembly	

== See also ==
- Kasta (Assembly constituency)
- Sixteenth Legislative Assembly of Uttar Pradesh
- Uttar Pradesh Legislative Assembly
