= Hargaon Assembly constituency =

Constituency of the Uttar Pradesh legislative assembly in India

Hargaon
- Constituency No. 147 for the Uttar Pradesh Legislative Assembly

Constituency details
- Country: India
- Region: North India
- State: Uttar Pradesh
- District: Sitapur
- Established: 1967
- Total electors: 276,435 (2012)
- Reservation: SC

Member of Legislative Assembly
- 18th Uttar Pradesh Legislative Assembly
- Incumbent Suresh Rahi
- Party: Bharatiya Janata Party
- Elected year: 2022

Hargaon is one of the 403 constituencies of the Uttar Pradesh Legislative Assembly, India. It is a part of the Sitapur district and one of the five assembly constituencies in the Dhaurahra Lok Sabha constituency. First election in this assembly constituency was held in 1967 after the "DPACO (1967)" (delimitation order) was passed in 1967. After the "Delimitation of Parliamentary and Assembly Constituencies Order" was passed in 2008, the constituency was assigned identification number 147.

== Wards / Areas ==
Extent of Hargaon Assembly constituency is PCs Narsohi, Gujra, Badagaon, Umari, Dena of Sitapur (Sadar) KC, PCs Musepur Mutawalli, Sonari, Rakhaona, Badewara of Khairabad KC, KC Hargaon & Hargaon NP of Sitapur Tehsil (Sadar); KC Katesar, PCs Samaudideeh, Bhadfar, Marsanda, Pipria, Tejwapur, Belwa Gohniya, Anba, Kusepa, Chandesua, Makhu Behar, Garasa, Ratauli, Ram Rurha, Chenia, Belwa Dingura, Foolpur Guria, Mugalpur & Bareti of Marsanda KC of Laharpur Tehsil.

== Members of the Legislative Assembly ==
#	Term	Name	Party	From	To	Days	Comments	Ref
01	04th Vidhan Sabha	S. Ram	Bharatiya Jana Sangh	Mar-1967	Apr-1968	402	-	
02	05th Vidhan Sabha	Ram Lal Rahi	Indian National Congress	Feb-1969	Mar-1974	1,832	-	
03	06th Vidhan Sabha	Ram Lal Rahi	Indian National Congress	Mar-1974	Apr-1977	1,153	-	
04	07th Vidhan Sabha	Gokaran Prasad	Janata Party	Jun-1977	Feb-1980	969	-	
05	08th Vidhan Sabha	Paragi Lal Chaudhari	Indian National Congress (I)	Jun-1980	Mar-1985	1,735	-	
06	09th Vidhan Sabha	Paragi Lal Chaudhari	Indian National Congress	Mar-1985	Nov-1989	1,725	-	
07	10th Vidhan Sabha	Daulat Ram	Bharatiya Janata Party	Dec-1989	Apr-1991	488	-	
08	11th Vidhan Sabha	Daulat Ram	Bharatiya Janata Party	Jun-1991	Dec-1992	533	-	
09	12th Vidhan Sabha	Daulat Ram	Bharatiya Janata Party	Dec-1993	Oct-1995	693	-	
10	13th Vidhan Sabha	Ramesh Rahi	Samajwadi Party	Oct-1996	May-2002	1,967	-	
11	14th Vidhan Sabha	Ramhet Bharti	Bahujan Samaj Party	Feb-2002	May-2007	1,902	-	
12	15th Vidhan Sabha	Ramhet Bharti	Bahujan Samaj Party	May-2007	Mar-2012	1,762	-	
13	16th Vidhan Sabha	Ramhet Bharti	Bahujan Samaj Party	Mar-2012	Mar-2017	-	-	
14	17th Vidhan Sabha	Suresh Rahi	Bharatiya Janata Party	Mar-2017	Mar-2022			
15	18th Vidhan Sabha	Suresh Rahi	Bharatiya Janata Party	Mar-2022	Incumbent			

== Election results ==
=== 2027 ===
2027 Uttar Pradesh Legislative Assembly election: Hargaon
Party	Candidate	Votes	%	±%
INDIA				
NDA				
BSP				
NOTA	None of the above			
Majority				
Turnout				
gain from		Swing		

=== 2022 ===
2022 Uttar Pradesh Legislative Assembly election: Hargaon
Party	Candidate	Votes	%	±%
BJP	Suresh Rahi	116,691	52.46	▲6.51
SP	Ramhet Bharti	78,531	35.31	▲12.62
BSP	Ranu Chaudhary	16,226	7.3	▼18.32
INC	Mamta Bharti	3,130	1.41	
Communist Party of India (Marxist-Leninist)(Liberation)	Arjun Lal	2,600	1.17	▲0.24
NOTA	None of the above	1,688	0.76	▼0.25
Majority		38,160	17.15	▼3.18
Turnout		222,425	68.07	▼3.26
BJP hold		Swing		

=== 2017 ===
2017 Uttar Pradesh Legislative Assembly Election: Hargaon
Party	Candidate	Votes	%	±%
BJP	Suresh Rahi	101,680	45.95	
BSP	Ramhet Bharti	56,685	25.62	
SP	Manoj Kumar Rajvanshi	50,211	22.69	
Sarv Sambhaav Party	Amit Kumar	2,700	1.22	
PECP	Ramnaresh	2,648	1.2	
Communist Party of India (Marxist-Leninist)(Liberation)	Arjun Lal	2,053	0.93	
NOTA	None of the above	2,220	1.01	
Majority		44,995	20.33	
Turnout		221,261	71.33	

=== 2012 ===
16th Vidhan Sabha: 2012 General Elections

2012 General Elections: Hargaon
Party	Candidate	Votes	%	±%
BSP	Ramhet Bharti	73,889	38.36	−
SP	R. P. Chowdhary	61,740	32.06	−
INC	Manjari Rahi	38,932	20.21	−
	Remainder 8 candidates	18,043	9.38	−
Majority		12,149	6.31	−
Turnout		192,604	69.67	−
BSP gain from BSP		Swing		

== See also ==
- Dhaurahra Lok Sabha constituency
- Sitapur district
- Sixteenth Legislative Assembly of Uttar Pradesh
- Uttar Pradesh Legislative Assembly
- Vidhan Bhawan
