= Shamsher Bahadur (politician) =

Shamsher Bahadur शमशेर बहादुर

MLA, 16th Legislative Assembly
- Incumbent
- Assumed office Mar 2012
- Preceded by: Awasthi Bala Prashad
- Constituency: Dhaurahra

Personal details
- Born: 1 March 1967 (age 59) Lakhimpur Kheri district
- Party: Bahujan Samaj Party
- Spouse: Rani (wife)
- Children: 2 sons & 1 daughter
- Parent: Narendra Kumar (father)
- Education: B.Sc., LLB
- Alma mater: University of Lucknow
- Profession: Politician & Lawyer

Shamsher Bahadur (Hindi: शमशेर बहादुर) is an Indian politician and a member of the 16th Legislative Assembly in India. He represents the Dhaurahra constituency of Uttar Pradesh and is a member of the Bahujan Samaj Party political party and he started his political career in 1990. In his early life he used to help the people no matter which religion or caste they belonged to.

== Early life and education ==
Shamsher Bahadur was born in Lakhimpur Kheri district. He attended the University of Lucknow and attained Bachelor of Science & Bachelor of Laws degrees. He is a lawyer by profession and a well known social activist, he got big responsibilities when he was only 17.

== Political career ==
Shamsher Bahadur has been a MLA for one term. He defeated an ex Minister and he represented the Dhaurahra constituency and is a member of the Samajwadi Party political party.

== Posts held ==
#	From	To	Position	Comments
01	2012	Incumbent	Member, 16th Legislative Assembly	

== See also ==
- Dhaurahra (Assembly constituency)
- Sixteenth Legislative Assembly of Uttar Pradesh
- Uttar Pradesh Legislative Assembly
