= Saurabh Singh (Uttar Pradesh politician) =

Indian politician

Member of the Uttar Pradesh legislative assembly
- Incumbent
- Assumed office 2017
- Constituency: Kasta

Personal details
- Party: Bharatiya Janata Party
- Occupation: MLA
- Profession: Politician

Saurabh Singh is an Indian politician and a member of 17th Uttar Pradesh Assembly, Uttar Pradesh of India. He represents the Kasta constituency in Lakhimpur district of Uttar Pradesh.

== Political career ==
Saurabh Singh contested 17th Uttar Pradesh Assembly Election as Bharatiya Janata Party candidate and defeated his close contestant Sunil Kumar Lala from Samajwadi Party with a margin of 24,273 votes.

== Posts held ==
#	From	To	Position	Comments
01	2017	Incumbent	Member, 17th Legislative Assembly	
