= Shashank Trivedi =

Indian politician

Member of the Uttar Pradesh Legislative Assembly
- Incumbent
- Assumed office 2017
- Preceded by: Shashank Trivedi
- Constituency: Maholi, Sitapur, Uttar Pradesh

Personal details
- Born: 18 July Brahmawali Maholi, Sitapur, Uttar Pradesh, India
- Party: Bharatiya Janata Party
- Parents: Kaushal Kishore Trivedi (father); Vimla Trivedi (mother)
- Education: Colvin Taluqdars' College
- Occupation: MLA, businessman
- Profession: Engineer, politician

Shashank Trivedi is an Indian politician and a member of 18th Uttar Pradesh Assembly, Uttar Pradesh of India. He represents the ‘Maholi’ constituency in Sitapur district of Uttar Pradesh.

== Political career ==
Shashank Trivedi contested Uttar Pradesh Assembly Elections 2017 for the first time, as the Bharatiya Janata Party candidate for Maholi (Assembly constituency) constituency. He defeated incumbent Anoop Kumar Gupta of the Samajwadi Party in a close contest with a margin of 3,717 votes. This was a major win for Bharatiya Janata Party in Sitapur district, since the incumbent and his father (earlier independent candidate and then Samajwadi Party) had represented the area for more than two decades. Shashank Trivedi again was elected for same constituency for 18th UP Assembly in March 2022.

Shashank Trivedi is also member of ethics committee in UP legislative assembly for 2017–2018.

== Posts held ==
#	From	To	Position	Comments
01	2022	Incumbent	Member, 18th Legislative Assembly	
02	2017	2022	Member, 17th Legislative Assembly	
