= Kasta Assembly constituency =

Constituency of the Uttar Pradesh legislative assembly in India

Kasta
- Constituency No. 143 for the Uttar Pradesh Legislative Assembly

Constituency details
- Country: India
- Region: North India
- State: Uttar Pradesh
- District: Lakhimpur
- Total electors: 291,914 (2012)
- Reservation: SC

Member of Legislative Assembly
- 18th Uttar Pradesh Legislative Assembly
- Incumbent Saurabh Singh
- Party: Bhartiya Janta Party
- Elected year: 2017

Kasta Assembly constituency is one of the 403 constituencies of the Uttar Pradesh Legislative Assembly, India. It is a part of the Lakhimpur district and one of the five assembly constituencies in the Dhaurahra Lok Sabha constituency. First election in this assembly constituency was held in 2012 after the "Delimitation of Parliamentary and Assembly Constituencies Order, 2008" was passed and the constituency was formed in 2008. The constituency is assigned identification number 143.

== Wards / Areas ==
Extent of Kasta Assembly constituency is KCs Kheri, Kheri Sri Nagar, Lakhimpur MB, Oel Dhakhawa NP & Kheri NP of Lakhimpur Tehsil.

== Members of the Legislative Assembly ==
#	Term	Name	Party	From	To	Days	Comments	Ref
01	16th Vidhan Sabha	Sunil Kumar Lala	Samajwadi Party	Mar-2012	Mar-2017	-	-	
02	17th Vidhan Sabha	Saurabh Singh	Bhartiya Janta Party	Mar-2017	Mar-2022	-	-	
03	18th Vidhan Sabha	Saurabh Singh	Bhartiya Janta Party	Mar-2022	Incumbent	-	-	

== Election results ==
=== 2027 ===
2027 Uttar Pradesh Legislative Assembly election: Kasta
Party	Candidate	Votes	%	±%
INDIA				
NDA				
BSP				
NOTA	None of the above			
Majority				
Turnout				
gain from		Swing		

=== 2022 ===
2022 Uttar Pradesh Legislative Assembly Election: Kasta
Party	Candidate	Votes	%	±%
BJP	Saurabh Singh	103,315	47.93	+3.73
SP	Sunil Kumar Lala	89,498	41.52	+8.87
BSP	Hemvati Devi	16,344	7.58	−12.32
INC	Radhe Shyam	1,956	0.91	
NOTA	None of the above	1,399	0.65	−0.3
Majority		13,817	6.41	−5.14
Turnout		215,550	69.6	−0.64
BJP hold		Swing		

=== 2017 ===
2017 Uttar Pradesh Legislative Assembly Election: Kasta
Party	Candidate	Votes	%	±%
BJP	Saurabh Singh	92,824	44.2	
SP	Sunil Kumar Lala	68,551	32.65	
BSP	Rajesh Kumar	41,778	19.9	
CPI(M)	Arvind Kumar	1,997	0.95	
NOTA	None of the above	1,978	0.95	
Majority		24,273	11.55	
Turnout		209,987	70.24	

=== 2012 ===
2012 General Elections: Kasta
Party	Candidate	Votes	%	±%
SP	Sunil Kumar Lala	88,548	45.29	−
BSP	Saurabh Singh	61,677	31.55	−
INC	Banshidhar Raj	16,749	8.57	−
	Remainder 8 candidates	28,537	14.61	−
Majority		26,871	13.74	−
Turnout		195,511	66.98	−
SP hold		Swing		

== See also ==
- Dhaurahra Lok Sabha constituency
- Lakhimpur Kheri district
- Sixteenth Legislative Assembly of Uttar Pradesh
- Uttar Pradesh Legislative Assembly
- Vidhan Bhawan
