= Dr. Shakuntala Misra National Rehabilitation University =

University for people with disabilities

Coordinates: 26°49′59″N 80°50′15″E

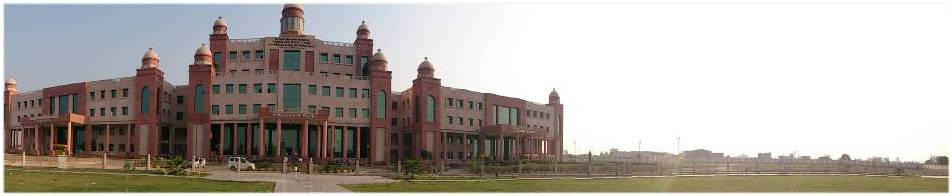
- Motto: For Differently Abled
- Type: State university
- Established: 19 February 2009; 17 years ago
- Affiliations: UGC
- Chancellor: Governor of Uttar Pradesh
- Vice-Chancellor: Sanjay Singh
- Location: Lucknow, Uttar Pradesh, India
- Campus: 131 acres (0.53 km^{2}); Urban
- Website: dsmru.up.nic.in

Dr. Shakuntala Misra National Rehabilitation University (DSMNRU) is a state university located in Lucknow, Uttar Pradesh, India.

== History ==
Dr. Shakuntala Misra National Rehabilitation University was established by the Divyangjan Sashaktikaran Vibhag of the Government of Uttar Pradesh through an ordinance dated 29 August 2008, which was later replaced by U.P. Act No. 1 of 2009, dated 19 February 2009 and U.P. Act No. 24 of 2011, dated 28 November 2011.

== Departments ==
The university has multiple faculties, including arts, commerce and management, computer and information technology, law, music and fine art, science and technology, engineering and technology, and special education.
