= Suresh Rahi =

Indian politician

Member of the Uttar Pradesh Legislative Assembly
- Incumbent
- Assumed office 2017
- Preceded by: Ramhet Bharti
- Constituency: Hargaon

Personal details
- Party: Bharatiya Janata Party

Suresh Rahi is an Indian politician and a member of 17th Uttar Pradesh Assembly, Uttar Pradesh of India. He represents the ‘Hargaon’ constituency in Sitapur district of Uttar Pradesh.

== Political career ==
Suresh Rahi contested Uttar Pradesh Assembly Election as Bharatiya Janata Party candidate and defeated his close contestant Ramhet Bharti from Bahujan Samaj Party with a margin of 44,995 votes.

== Posts held ==
#	From	To	Position	Comments
01	2017	Incumbent	Member, 17th Legislative Assembly	
