= Dharhara =

Dharhara may refer to:

- Dharhara, Bhagalpur, in Bhagalpur district of Bihar, India
- Dharhara (community development block), in Munger district of Bihar

== See also ==
- Dharahara, a tower in Sundhara, Kathmandu, Nepal
