= Mohammdi Assembly constituency =

Constituency of the Uttar Pradesh legislative assembly in India

Mohammdi
- Constituency No. 144 for the Uttar Pradesh Legislative Assembly

Constituency details
- Country: India
- Region: North India
- State: Uttar Pradesh
- District: Lakhimpur
- Total electors: 307,243 (2012)
- Reservation: None

Member of Legislative Assembly
- 18th Uttar Pradesh Legislative Assembly
- Incumbent Lokendra Pratap Singh
- Party: BJP
- Elected year: 2017

Mohammdi Assembly constituency is one of the 403 constituencies of the Uttar Pradesh Legislative Assembly, India. It is a part of the Lakhimpur district and one of the five assembly constituencies in the Dhaurahra Lok Sabha constituency. First election in this assembly constituency was held in 1957 after the "DPACO (1956)" (delimitation order) was passed in 1956. After the "Delimitation of Parliamentary and Assembly Constituencies Order" was passed in 2008, the constituency was assigned identification number 144.

== Wards / Areas ==
Extent of Mohammdi Assembly constituency is KCs Mohammdi, Atwa Pipariya, Pasgawan, PCs Semraghat, Alliyapur, Pipri Aziz, Barbar, Patvan, Ghaghpur, Dilawal Nagar, Bhounapur, Basara, Maqsoodpur of Aurangabad KC, Mohammadi MB & Barbar NP of Mohammdi Tehsil.

== Members of the Legislative Assembly ==
#	Term	Name	Party	From	To	Days	Comments	Ref
01	01st Vidhan Sabha	-	-	Mar-1952	Mar-1957	1,849	Constituency not in existence	
02	02nd Vidhan Sabha	Manna Lal	Bharatiya Jana Sangh	Apr-1957	Mar-1962	1,800	-	
02	02nd Vidhan Sabha	Jagdish Narain Datta Singh	Bharatiya Jana Sangh	Apr-1957	Mar-1962	1,800	-	
03	03rd Vidhan Sabha	Manna Lal	Bharatiya Jana Sangh	Mar-1962	Mar-1967	1,828	-	
04	04th Vidhan Sabha	Manna Lal	Bharatiya Jana Sangh	Mar-1967	Apr-1968	402	-	
05	05th Vidhan Sabha	Sewa Ram	Indian National Congress	Feb-1969	Mar-1974	1,832	-	
06	06th Vidhan Sabha	Manna Lal	Bharatiya Jana Sangh	Mar-1974	Apr-1977	1,153	-	
07	07th Vidhan Sabha	Manna Lal	Janata Party	Jun-1977	Feb-1980	969	-	
08	08th Vidhan Sabha	Banshi Dhar Raj	Indian National Congress (I)	Jun-1980	Mar-1985	1,735	-	
09	09th Vidhan Sabha	Banshi Dhar Raj	Indian National Congress	Mar-1985	Nov-1989	1,725	-	
10	10th Vidhan Sabha	Chhotey Lal	Bharatiya Janata Party	Dec-1989	Apr-1991	488	-	
11	11th Vidhan Sabha	Banshi Dhar Raj	Indian National Congress	Jun-1991	Dec-1992	533	-	
12	12th Vidhan Sabha	Jagan Nath Prasad	Bharatiya Janata Party	Dec-1993	Oct-1995	693	-	
13	13th Vidhan Sabha	Krishna Raj	Bharatiya Janata Party	Oct-1996	May-2002	1,967	-	
14	14th Vidhan Sabha	Banshi Dhar Raj	Samajwadi Party	Feb-2002	May-2007	1,902	-	
15	15th Vidhan Sabha	Krishna Raj	Bharatiya Janata Party	May-2007	Mar-2012	1,762	-	
16	16th Vidhan Sabha	Awasthi Bala Prasad	Bahujan Samaj Party	Mar-2012	Mar-2017	-	-	
17	17th Vidhan Sabha	Lokendra Pratap Singh	Bharatiya Janata Party	Mar- 2017	Mar-2022			
18	18th Vidhan Sabha	Lokendra Pratap Singh	Bharatiya Janata Party	Mar-2022	Incumbent			

== Election results ==
=== 2027 ===
2027 Uttar Pradesh Legislative Assembly election: Mohammdi
Party	Candidate	Votes	%	±%
INDIA				
NDA				
BSP				
NOTA	None of the above			
Majority				
Turnout				
gain from		Swing		

=== 2022 ===
2022 Uttar Pradesh Legislative Assembly election: Mohammdi
Party	Candidate	Votes	%	±%
BJP	Lokendra Pratap Singh	99,377	42.75	+0.31
SP	Dawood Ahmed	94,506	40.66	
BSP	Shakeel Ahmed Siddiqui	31,144	13.4	−13.02
INC	Reetu Singh	2,419	1.04	−25.92
NOTA	None of the above	1,751	0.75	−0.32
Majority		4,871	2.09	−13.39
Turnout		232,436	68.63	−0.88
BJP hold		Swing		

=== 2017 ===
2017 General Elections: Mohammdi
Party	Candidate	Votes	%	±%
BJP	Lokendra Pratap Singh	93,000	42.44	
INC	Sanjay Sharma	59,082	26.96	
BSP	Dawood Ahmed	57,902	26.42	
NOTA	None of the above	2,330	1.07	
Majority		33,918	15.48	
Turnout		219,146	69.51	
BJP gain from BSP		Swing		

== See also ==
- Dhaurahra Lok Sabha constituency
- Lakhimpur Kheri district
- Sixteenth Legislative Assembly of Uttar Pradesh
- Uttar Pradesh Legislative Assembly
- Vidhan Bhawan
