= Maholi Assembly constituency =

Constituency of the Uttar Pradesh legislative assembly in India

Maholi
- Constituency No. 145 for the Uttar Pradesh Legislative Assembly

Constituency details
- Country: India
- Region: North India
- State: Uttar Pradesh
- District: Sitapur
- Total electors: 323,667 (2012)
- Reservation: None

Member of Legislative Assembly
- 18th Uttar Pradesh Legislative Assembly
- Incumbent Shashank Trivedi
- Party: Bhartiya Janata Party
- Elected year: 2017

Maholi Assembly constituency is one of the 403 constituencies of the Uttar Pradesh Legislative Assembly, India. It is a part of the Sitapur district and one of the five assembly constituencies in the Dhaurahra Lok Sabha constituency. The first election in this assembly constituency was held in 2012 after the "Delimitation of Parliamentary and Assembly Constituencies Order, 2008" was passed and the constituency was formed in 2008. The second elections were held in 2017. The constituency is assigned identification number 145.

== Wards / Areas ==
Extent of Maholi Assembly constituency is KCs Pisawan, Maholi, Chandra & Maholi NP of Mishrikh Tehsil; PCs Saraora, Godwa, Bambhaura, Rojaha, Jagana, Tihar, Sahadat Nagar, Sohai, Baseti, Bibipur, Koraiya Udaypur, Jar, Arthalia Grant, Keshawpur & Aliya of Aliya KC of Sitapur Tehsil (Sadar).

== Members of the Legislative Assembly ==
#	Term	Name	Party	From	To	Days	Comments	Ref
03	18th Vidhan Sabha	Shashank Trivedi	Bharatiya Janata Party	Mar-2022	Incumbent	-		
02	17th Vidhan Sabha	Shashank Trivedi	Bharatiya Janata Party	Mar-2017	Mar-2022	5 years		
01	16th Vidhan Sabha	Anoop Kumar Gupta	Samajwadi Party	Mar-2012	Mar-2017	5 years	-	

== Election results ==
=== 2027 ===
2027 Uttar Pradesh Legislative Assembly election: Maholi
Party	Candidate	Votes	%	±%
INDIA				
NDA				
BSP				
NOTA	None of the above			
Majority				
Turnout				
gain from		Swing		

=== 2022 ===
U. P. Legislative Assembly Election, 2022: Maholi Assembly constituency
Party	Candidate	Votes	%	±%
BJP	Shashank Trivedi	112,040	44.73	▲11.24
SP	Anoop Kumar Gupta	99,868	39.87	▲7.92
BSP	Dr Rajendra Prasad Verma	25,507	10.18	▼15.02
NOTA	None of the above	1,480	0.59	▼0.1
Majority		12,172	4.86	▲3.32
Turnout		250,504	66.11	▼2.57
BJP hold		Swing	+11.25%	

=== 2017 ===
U. P. Legislative Assembly Election, 2017: Maholi Assembly constituency
Party	Candidate	Votes	%	±%
BJP	Shashank Trivedi	80,938	33.49	
SP	Anoop Kumar Gupta	77,221	31.95	
BSP	Mahesh Chandra Mishra	60,917	25.2	
LKD	Mahendra Singh Verma	11,214	4.64	
NOTA	None of the above	1,665	0.69	
Majority		3,717	1.54	
Turnout		241,699	68.68	
BJP hold		Swing	+30.52%	

=== 2012 ===
U. P. Legislative Assembly Election, 2012: Maholi Assembly constituency
Party	Candidate	Votes	%	±%
SP	Anoop Kumar Gupta	87,160	40.04	−
BSP	Mahesh Chandra Mishra	64,445	29.6	−
INC	Gaya Prasad	29,089	13.36	−
PECP	Er R A Singh Arkwanshi	18,700	8.60	−
Majority		22,715	10.43	−
Turnout		217,700	67.26	−
SP hold		Swing	-	

== See also ==
- Dhaurahra Lok Sabha constituency
- Sitapur district
- Sixteenth Legislative Assembly of Uttar Pradesh
- Uttar Pradesh Legislative Assembly
- Vidhan Bhawan
