= Dhaurahra Assembly constituency =

Constituency of the Uttar Pradesh legislative assembly in India

Dhaurahra
- Constituency No. 141 for the Uttar Pradesh Legislative Assembly

Constituency details
- Country: India
- Region: North India
- State: Uttar Pradesh
- District: Lakhimpur
- Lok Sabha constituency: Dhaurahra
- Total electors: 307,467 (2012)
- Reservation: None

Member of Legislative Assembly
- 18th Uttar Pradesh Legislative Assembly
- Incumbent Vinod Shankar Avasthi
- Party: BJP
- Elected year: 2022

Dhaurahra Assembly constituency is one of the 403 constituencies of the Uttar Pradesh Legislative Assembly, India. It is a part of the Lakhimpur district and one of the five assembly constituencies in the Dhaurahra Lok Sabha constituency. First election in this assembly constituency was held in 1957 after the "DPACO (1956)" (delimitation order) was passed in 1956. After the "Delimitation of Parliamentary and Assembly Constituencies Order" was passed in 2008, the constituency was assigned identification number 141. Vinod Shankar Avasthi of Bharatiya Janata Party is the MLA of Dhaurahra constituency elected in 2022.

== Wards / Areas ==
Extent of Dhaurahra Assembly constituency is KCs Dhaurahra, Isanagar, Kattouli, PCs Dulhi, Jatpurwa, Lakhahi, Abhaypur, Devmaniya, Akathi, Kafara, Gurgutta Buzurg, Muri & Dihuwa Kalan of Ramiya Behar KC of Dhaurahra Tehsil.

== Members of the Legislative Assembly ==
From	Term	Name	Party
	01st Vidhan Sabha	Constituency not in existence	
Apr-1957	02nd Vidhan Sabha	Jagannath Prasad	Praja Socialist Party
Mar-1962	03rd Vidhan Sabha	Taaj Narain Trivedi	Indian National Congress
Mar-1967	04th Vidhan Sabha	Jagannath Prasad	Praja Socialist Party
Feb-1969	05th Vidhan Sabha	Jagannath Prasad	Indian National Congress
Mar-1974	06th Vidhan Sabha	Saraswati Pratap Singh	Independent politician
Jun-1977	07th Vidhan Sabha	Jagannath Prasad	Independent politician
Jun-1980	08th Vidhan Sabha	Taaj Narain Trivedi	Independent politician
Mar-1985	09th Vidhan Sabha	Saraswati Pratap Singh	Independent politician
Dec-1989	10th Vidhan Sabha	Saraswati Pratap Singh	Indian National Congress
Jun-1991	11th Vidhan Sabha	Awasthi Bala Prasad	Bharatiya Janata Party
Dec-1993	12th Vidhan Sabha	Yeshpal Chaudary	Samajwadi Party
Oct-1996	13th Vidhan Sabha	Saraswati Pratap Singh	Indian National Congress
Feb-2002	14th Vidhan Sabha	Yeshpal Chaudary	Samajwadi Party
May-2007	15th Vidhan Sabha	Awasthi Bala Prasad	Bahujan Samaj Party
Mar-2012	16th Vidhan Sabha	Shamsher Bahadur	Bahujan Samaj Party
Mar-2017	17th Vidhan Sabha	Awasthi Bala Prasad	Bharatiya Janata Party
Mar-2022	18th Vidhan Sabha	Vinod Shankar Avasthi	Bharatiya Janata Party

== Election results ==
=== 2027 ===
2027 Uttar Pradesh Legislative Assembly election: Dhanurahra
Party	Candidate	Votes	%	±%
INDIA				
NDA				
BSP				
NOTA	None of the above			
Majority				
Turnout				
gain from		Swing		

=== 2022 ===
2022 Uttar Pradesh Legislative Assembly election: Dhaurahra
Party	Candidate	Votes	%	±%
BJP	Vinod Shankar Avasthi	113,498	49.49	▲13.43
SP	Varun Singh	88,888	38.76	▲4.22
BSP	Anand Mohan	16,122	7.03	▼17.7
SS	Mulander Kumar Awasthi	2,566	1.12	▲0.71
NOTA	None of the above	2,478	1.08	▼0.46
Majority		24,610	10.73	▲9.21
Turnout		229,315	69.04	▲0.25
BJP hold				

=== 2017 ===
2017 Uttar Pradesh Legislative Assembly election: Dhaurahra
Party	Candidate	Votes	%	±%
BJP	Bala Prasad Awasthi	79,809	36.06	
SP	Yeshpal Chaudhary	76,456	34.54	
BSP	Shamsher Bahadur	54,723	24.73	
LKD	Anuj Kumar	2,065	0.93	
NOTA	None of the above	3,360	1.54	
Majority		3,353	1.52	
Turnout		221,323	68.79	
BJP gain from BSP		Swing		

=== 2012 ===
2012 General Elections: Dhaurahra
Party	Candidate	Votes	%	±%
BSP	Shamsher Bahadur	64,139	30.54	−
SP	Yashpal Choudhary	63,094	30.04	−
INC	Kunwar Samar Pratap Singh	54,035	25.73	−
	Remainder 7 candidates	28,775	13.7	−
Majority		1,045	0.5	−
Turnout		210,043	68.31	−
BSP hold		Swing		

== See also ==
- Dhaurahra Lok Sabha constituency
- Lakhimpur Kheri district
- Sixteenth Legislative Assembly of Uttar Pradesh
- Uttar Pradesh Legislative Assembly
- Uttar Pradesh Legislature (Vidhan Bhawan)
