= Dhaurahra, Lucknow =

Village in Uttar Pradesh, India

Dhaurahra
- Village
- Location in Uttar Pradesh, India Dhaurahra (India)
- Coordinates: 26.77577°N 81.15625°E
- Country: India
- State: Uttar Pradesh
- District: Lucknow

Area
  - Total: 4.86 km^{2} (1.88 sq mi)
- Elevation: 113 m (371 ft)

Population (2011)
  - Total: 3,879
  - Density: 798/km^{2} (2,070/sq mi)

Languages
  - Official: Hindi
- Time zone: UTC+5:30 (IST)

Dhaurahra is a village in Gosainganj block of Lucknow district, Uttar Pradesh, India. As of 2011, its population is 3,879, in 671 households. It is the seat of a gram panchayat.
