= Dhaurehra =

- Town
- Location in Uttar Pradesh, India Dhaurehra (India)
- Coordinates: 27.998°N 81.088°E
- Country: India
- State: Uttar Pradesh
- District: Kheri

Population (2001)
  - Total: 18,882

Languages
  - Official: Hindi
- Time zone: UTC+5:30 (IST)
- Vehicle registration: UP
- Website: up.gov.in

Dhaurehra is a town and a nagar panchayat in Lakhimpur Kheri district in the state of Uttar Pradesh, India.

== Demographics ==
As of 2001 India census, Dhaurehra had a population of 18,882. Males constitute 53% of the population and females 47%. Dhaurehra has an average literacy rate of 28%, lower than the national average of 59.5%: male literacy is 34% and, female literacy is 21%. In Dhaurehra, 19% of the population is under 6 years of age.
