= 17th Uttar Pradesh Assembly =

Assembly term of a legislature in Uttar Pradesh, India constituted in 2017

| ← | 16th Uttar Pradesh Assembly | 18th Uttar Pradesh Assembly | → |

Overview
- Legislative body: Uttar Pradesh Legislative Assembly
- Meeting place: Vidhan Bhawan
- Term: 19 March 2017 – 12 March 2022
- Election: 2017 Uttar Pradesh Legislative Assembly Elections
- Government: Bharatiya Janata Party
- Opposition: Samajwadi Party
- Website: Official website
- Members: 404 (403 Elected + 1 Nominated)
- Chief Minister: Yogi Adityanath
- Deputy Chief Ministers: Keshav Prasad Maurya Dinesh Sharma
- Leader of the Opposition: Ram Govind Chaudhary
- Party control: Bharatiya Janata Party

The Seventeenth Legislative Assembly of Uttar Pradesh (Seventeenth Vidhan Sabha of Uttar Pradesh) was constituted on 19 March 2017 as a result of Uttar Pradesh Legislative Assembly election, 2017 held from 11 February to 8 March 2017. The Legislative Assembly had total of 404 MLAs (including one nominated Anglo-Indian member, Dr. Denzil J. Godin).

The term of the 17th assembly was from 19 March 2017 to 12 March 2022.

== Important members ==
| # | From | To | Position | Name | Party |
|---|---|---|---|---|---|
| 01 | 30 March 2017 | 12 March 2022 | Speaker | Hriday Narayan Dikshit | Bharatiya Janata Party |
| 02 | 18 October 2021 | 12 March 2022 | Deputy Speaker | Nitin Agrawal | Samajwadi Party |
| 03 | 19 March 2017 | 12 March 2022 | Leader of the House (Chief Minister) | Yogi Adityanath | Bharatiya Janata Party |
| 04 | 19 March 2017 | 12 March 2022 | Deputy Chief Ministers | Keshav Prasad Maurya; Dinesh Sharma | Bharatiya Janata Party |
| 05 | 28 March 2017 | 12 March 2022 | Leader of the Opposition | Ram Govind Chaudhary | Samajwadi Party |

== Strength at the time of dissolution ==
| Party | Alliance | Alliance Total | Seats |
|---|---|---|---|
| Bharatiya Janata Party | NDA | 322 | 312 |
| Apna Dal (Sonelal) | NDA | 322 | 9 |
| NISHAD Party | NDA | 322 | 1 |
| Samajwadi Party | SP+ | 53 | 49 |
| Suheldev Bharatiya Samaj Party | SP+ | 53 | 4 |
| Bahujan Samaj Party | | | 18 |
| Indian National Congress | UPA | 7 | 7 |
| Independents | | | 3 |
| Vacant | | | 1 |
| Total | | | 403 |

== Result ==
Summary of the Uttar Pradesh Legislative Assembly Election, 2017 Result
| Party | Alliance | Seats contested | Seats won | Seat change | Votes | Vote share | Swing |
|---|---|---|---|---|---|---|---|
| Bharatiya Janata Party | NDA | 384 | 312 | ▲265 | 34,403,039 | 40% | ▲24.7% |
| Apna Dal (Sonelal) | NDA | 11 | 9 | ▲9 | 851,336 | 1.0% | ▲1.0% |
| Suheldev Bharatiya Samaj Party | NDA | 8 | 4 | ▲4 | 851,336 | 1.0% | ▲1.0% |
| NDA | NDA | 403 | 325 | ▲278 | 35,254,375 | >41.4% | |
| Samajwadi Party | SP+ | 311 | 47 | ▼177 | 18,923,689 | 22% | ▼7.7% |
| Indian National Congress | SP+ | 114 | 7 | ▼21 | 5,416,324 | 6.2% | ▼5.43% |
| Bahujan Samaj Party | - | 403 | 19 | ▼61 | 19,281,352 | 22.2% | ▼3.71% |
| Rashtriya Lok Dal | - | 131 | 1 | ▼8 | 1,545,810 | 1.8% | ▼0.53% |
| Communist Party of India | Left | 90 | 0 | Steady | 138,763 | 0.2% | Steady |
| Communist Party of India (Marxist–Leninist) | Left | 50 | 0 | Steady | | | Steady |
| Communist Party of India (Marxist) | Left | 27 | 0 | Steady | | Steady | |
| Lok Dal (LD) | - | | 0 | Steady | 181,04 | 0.2% | |
| Apna Dal | Grand alliance | 150 | 0 | Steady | | Steady | |
| Peace Party of India | Grand Alliance | 150 | 0 | ▼4 | 227,998 | 0.3% | |
| | BMUP | - | | 0 | Steady | 152,844 | 0.2% |
| AIMIM | - | 38 | 0 | Steady | 205,232 | 0.2% | Steady |
| Nationalist Congress Party | - | | 0 | Steady | | | |
| Shiv Sena | - | 150 | 0 | Steady | | | |
| Independents | n/a | | 3 | ▼11 | 2,229,448 | 2.6% | |
| None of the above (NOTA) | n/a | n/a | n/a | n/a | 757,643 | 0.9% | ▲0.9% |

== Elected members ==
All members were elected on 11 March 2017 and following list might undergo further changes due to by-elections.
| # | Constituency | Candidate name | Party | Comments |
|---|---|---|---|---|
Saharanpur District
| 1 | Behat | Naresh Saini | Indian National Congress | |
| 2 | Nakur | Dharam Singh Saini | Bharatiya Janata Party | |
| 3 | Saharanpur Nagar | Sanjay Garg | Samajwadi Party | |
| 4 | Saharanpur | Masood Akhtar | Indian National Congress | |
| 5 | Deoband | Brijesh Singh | Bharatiya Janata Party | |
| 6 | Rampur Maniharan (SC) | Devendra Kumar Nim | Bharatiya Janata Party | |
| 7 | Gangoh | Pradeep Choudhary | Bharatiya Janata Party | Resigned on 24 May 2019 |
| 7 | Gangoh | Kirat Singh | Bharatiya Janata Party | Elected in By-Elections on 21 October 2019 |
Shamli District
| 8 | Kairana | Nahid Hasan | Samajwadi Party | |
| 9 | Thana Bhawan | Suresh Kumar | Bharatiya Janata Party | |
| 10 | Shamli | Tejendra Nirwal | Bharatiya Janata Party | |
Muzaffarnagar District
| 11 | Budhana | Umesh Malik | Bharatiya Janata Party | |
| 12 | Charthawal | Vijay Kumar Kashyap | Bharatiya Janata Party | |
| 13 | Purqazi (SC) | Pramod Utwal | Bharatiya Janata Party | |
| 14 | Muzaffarnagar | Kapil Dev Aggarwal | Bharatiya Janata Party | |
| 15 | Khatauli | Vikram Singh Saini | Bharatiya Janata Party | |
| 16 | Meerapur | Avtar Singh Bhadana | Bharatiya Janata Party | Joined INC on 14 February 2019 (Resignation Not Accepted) |
| 16 | Meerapur | Vacant | | |
Bijnor District
| 17 | Najibabad | Tasleem | Samajwadi Party | |
| 18 | Nagina (SC) | Manoj Kumar Paras | Samajwadi Party | |
| 19 | Barhapur | Sushant Kumar | Bharatiya Janata Party | |
| 20 | Dhampur | Ashok Kumar Rana | Bharatiya Janata Party | |
| 21 | Nehtaur (SC) | Om Kumar | Bharatiya Janata Party | |
| 22 | Bijnor | Suchi Chaudhary | Bharatiya Janata Party | |
| 23 | Chandpur | Kamlesh Saini | Bharatiya Janata Party | |
| 24 | Noorpur | Lokendra Singh | Bharatiya Janata Party | Died on 21 February 2018 |
| 24 | Noorpur | Naim Ul Hasan | Samajwadi Party | Elected during by-election |
Moradabad District
| 25 | Kanth | Rajesh Kumar Singh | Bharatiya Janata Party | |
| 26 | Thakurdwara | Nawab Jan | Samajwadi Party | |
| 27 | Moradabad Rural | Haji Ikram Qureshi | Samajwadi Party | |
| 28 | Moradabad Nagar | Ritesh Kumar Gupta | Bharatiya Janata Party | |
| 29 | Kundarki | Mohammad Rizwan | Samajwadi Party | |
| 30 | Bilari | Mohammad Faheem | Samajwadi Party | |
Sambhal District
| 31 | Chandausi (SC) | Gulab Devi | Bharatiya Janata Party | |
| 32 | Asmoli | Pinki Singh Yadav | Samajwadi Party | |
| 33 | Sambhal | Iqbal Mehmood | Samajwadi Party | |
Rampur District
| 34 | Suar | Abdullah Azam Khan | Samajwadi Party | Disqualified on 16 December 2019 |
| 35 | Chamraua | Naseer Ahmed Khan | Samajwadi Party | |
| 36 | Bilaspur | Baldev Singh Aulakh | Bharatiya Janata Party | |
| 37 | Rampur | Mohammad Azam Khan | Samajwadi Party | Resigned on 24 May 2019 |
| 37 | Rampur | Tazeen Fatma | Samajwadi Party | Elected in By-Elections on 21 October 2019 |
| 38 | Milak (SC) | Rajbala | Bharatiya Janata Party | |
Amroha District
| 39 | Dhanaura (SC) | Rajeev Tarara | Bharatiya Janata Party | |
| 40 | Naugawan Sadat | Chetan Chauhan | Bharatiya Janata Party | Died in August 2020 |
| 40 | Naugawan Sadat | Sangeeta Chauhan | Bharatiya Janata Party | Elected in By-Elections in November 2020 |
| 41 | Amroha | Mehboob Ali | Samajwadi Party | |
| 42 | Hasanpur | Mahender Singh Khadagvanshi | Bharatiya Janata Party | |
Meerut District
| 43 | Siwalkhas | Jitendra Pal Singh Billu | Bharatiya Janata Party | |
| 44 | Sardhana | Sangeet Singh Som | Bharatiya Janata Party | |
| 45 | Hastinapur | Dinesh Khatik | Bharatiya Janata Party | |
| 46 | Kithore | Satyavir Tyagi | Bharatiya Janata Party | |
| 47 | Meerut Cantt. | Satya Prakash Agarwal | Bharatiya Janata Party | |
| 48 | Meerut City | Haji Rafiq Ansari | Samajwadi Party | |
| 49 | Meerut South | Somendra Tomar | Bharatiya Janata Party | |
Bagpat District
| 50 | Chhaprauli | Sahender Singh | Bharatiya Janata Party | Left RLD after MLC election 2018 |
| 51 | Baraut | Krishnapal Malik | Bharatiya Janata Party | |
| 52 | Baghpat | Yogesh Dhama | Bharatiya Janata Party | |
Ghaziabad District
| 53 | Loni | Nandkishor Gurjar | Bharatiya Janata Party | |
| 54 | Muradnagar | Ajit Pal Tyagi | Bharatiya Janata Party | |
| 55 | Sahibabad | Sunil Kumar Sharma | Bharatiya Janata Party | |
| 56 | Ghaziabad | Atul Garg | Bharatiya Janata Party | |
| 57 | Modi Nagar | Manju Shivach | Bharatiya Janata Party | |
Hapur District
| 58 | Dholana | Aaslam Choudhary | Bahujan Samaj Party | |
| 59 | Hapur | Vijay Pal | Bharatiya Janata Party | |
| 60 | Garhmukteshwar | Kamal Singh Malik | Bharatiya Janata Party | |
Gautam Buddh Nagar District
| 61 | Noida | Pankaj Singh | Bharatiya Janata Party | |
| 62 | Dadri | Tejpal Singh Nagar | Bharatiya Janata Party | |
| 63 | Jewar | Dhirendra Singh | Bharatiya Janata Party | |
Bulandshahr District
| 64 | Sikandrabad | Bimla Singh Solanki | Bharatiya Janata Party | |
| 65 | Bulandshahr | Virendra Singh Sirohi | Bharatiya Janata Party | |
| 65 | Bulandshahr | Usha Sirohi | Bharatiya Janata Party | Elected in By-Elections in November 2020 |
| 66 | Syana | Devendra | Bharatiya Janata Party | |
| 67 | Anupshahr | Sanjay | Bharatiya Janata Party | |
| 68 | Debai | Anita Singh Rajput | Bharatiya Janata Party | |
| 69 | Shikarpur | Anil Sharma | Bharatiya Janata Party | |
| 70 | Khurja (SC) | Vijendra Singh | Bharatiya Janata Party | |
Aligarh District
| 71 | Khair (SC) | Anoop | Bharatiya Janata Party | |
| 72 | Barauli | Dalveer Singh | Bharatiya Janata Party | |
| 73 | Atrauli | Sandeep Singh | Bharatiya Janata Party | |
| 74 | Chharra | Ravendra Pal Singh | Bharatiya Janata Party | |
| 75 | Koil | Anil Parashar | Bharatiya Janata Party | |
| 76 | Aligarh | Sanjeev Raja | Bharatiya Janata Party | |
| 77 | Iglas (SC) | Rajvir Singh Diler | Bharatiya Janata Party | Resigned on 24 May 2019 |
| 77 | Iglas (SC) | Rajkumar Sahyogi | Bharatiya Janata Party | Elected in By-Elections on 21 October 2019 |
Hathras District
| 78 | Hathras (SC) | Hari Shankar Mahor | Bharatiya Janata Party | |
| 79 | Sadabad | Ramveer Upadhyay | Bahujan Samaj Party | |
| 80 | Sikandra Rao | Birendra Singh Rana | Bharatiya Janata Party | |
Mathura District
| 81 | Chhata | Chaudhary Laxmi Narayan Singh | Bharatiya Janata Party | |
| 82 | Mant | Shyam Sunder Sharma | Bahujan Samaj Party | |
| 83 | Goverdhan | Karinda Singh | Bharatiya Janata Party | |
| 84 | Mathura | Shrikant Sharma | Bharatiya Janata Party | |
| 85 | Baldev (SC) | Pooran Prakash | Bharatiya Janata Party | |
Agra District
| 86 | Etmadpur | Ram Pratap Singh | Bharatiya Janata Party | |
| 87 | Agra Cantt. (SC) | Girraj Singh Dharmesh | Bharatiya Janata Party | |
| 88 | Agra South | Yogendra Upadhyaya | Bharatiya Janata Party | |
| 89 | Agra North | Jagan Prasad Garg | Bharatiya Janata Party | Died on 10 April 2019 |
| 89 | Agra North | Purushottam Khandelwal | Bharatiya Janata Party | Elected in 2019 by-elections |
| 90 | Agra Rural (SC) | Hemlata Divakar | Bharatiya Janata Party | |
| 91 | Fatehpur Sikri | Chaudhary Udaybhan Singh | Bharatiya Janata Party | |
| 92 | Kheragarh | Mahesh Kumar Goyal | Bharatiya Janata Party | |
| 93 | Fatehabad | Jitendra Verma | Bharatiya Janata Party | |
| 94 | Bah | Rani Pakshalika Singh | Bharatiya Janata Party | |
Firozabad District
| 95 | Tundla (SC) | S.P. Singh Baghel | Bharatiya Janata Party | Resigned on 24 May 2019 |
| 95 | Tundla (SC) | Prempal Singh Dhangar | Bharatiya Janata Party | Elected in By-Elections in November 2020 |
| 96 | Jasrana | Ramgopal | Bharatiya Janata Party | |
| 97 | Firozabad | Manish Asiza | Bharatiya Janata Party | |
| 98 | Shikohabad | Mukesh Verma | Bharatiya Janata Party | |
| 99 | Sirsaganj | Hariom Yadav | Samajwadi Party | |
Kasganj District
| 100 | Kasganj | Devendra Singh Rajput | Bharatiya Janata Party | |
| 101 | Amanpur | Devendra Pratap | Bharatiya Janata Party | |
| 102 | Patiyali | Mamtesh | Bharatiya Janata Party | |
Etah District
| 103 | Aliganj | Satyapal Singh Rathaur | Bharatiya Janata Party | |
| 104 | Etah | Vipin Kumar David | Bharatiya Janata Party | |
| 105 | Marhara | Virendra | Bharatiya Janata Party | |
| 106 | Jalesar (SC) | Sanjeev Kumar Diwakar | Bharatiya Janata Party | |
Mainpuri District
| 107 | Mainpuri | Raju Yadav | Samajwadi Party | |
| 108 | Bhongaon | Ram Naresh Agnihotri | Bharatiya Janata Party | |
| 109 | Kishni (SC) | Brajesh Katheriya | Samajwadi Party | |
| 110 | Karhal | Sobaran Singh Yadav | Samajwadi Party | |
Sambhal District
| 111 | Gunnaur | Ajeet Kumar (alias Raju Yadav) | Bharatiya Janata Party | |
Budaun District
| 112 | Bisauli (SC) | Kushagra Sagar | Bharatiya Janata Party | |
| 113 | Sahaswan | Omkar Singh Yadav | Samajwadi Party | |
| 114 | Bilsi | Pt. Radha Krishan Sharma | Bharatiya Janata Party | |
| 115 | Badaun | Mahesh Chandra Gupta | Bharatiya Janata Party | |
| 116 | Shekhupur | Dharmendra Kumar Singh Shakya | Bharatiya Janata Party | |
| 117 | Dataganj | Rajeev Kumar Singh (Dataganj politician) (Babbu Bhaiya) | Bharatiya Janata Party | |
Bareilly District
| 118 | Baheri | Chhatrapal Singh Gangwar | Bharatiya Janata Party | |
| 119 | Meerganj | D.C. Verma | Bharatiya Janata Party | |
| 120 | Bhojipura | Bahoran Lal Maurya | Bharatiya Janata Party | |
| 121 | Nawabganj | Kesar Singh | Bharatiya Janata Party | |
| 122 | Faridpur (SC) | Shyam Bihari Lal | Bharatiya Janata Party | |
| 123 | Bithari Chainpur | Rajesh Kumar Mishra | Bharatiya Janata Party | |
| 124 | Bareilly | Arun Kumar | Bharatiya Janata Party | |
| 125 | Bareilly Cantt | Rajesh Agarwal | Bharatiya Janata Party | |
| 126 | Aonla | Dharmpal Singh | Bharatiya Janata Party | |
Pilibhit District
| 127 | Pilibhit | Sanjay Singh Gangwar | Bharatiya Janata Party | |
| 128 | Barkhera | Kishan Lal Rajpoot | Bharatiya Janata Party | |
| 129 | Puranpur (SC) | Babu Ram Paswan | Bharatiya Janata Party | |
| 130 | Bisalpur | Agys Ramsaran Verma | Bharatiya Janata Party | |
Shahjahanpur District
| 131 | Katra | Veer Vikram Singh Prince | Bharatiya Janata Party | |
| 132 | Jalalabad | Sharadvir Singh | Samajwadi Party | |
| 133 | Tilhar | Roshan Lal Verma | Bharatiya Janata Party | |
| 134 | Powayan (SC) | Chetram | Bharatiya Janata Party | |
| 135 | Shahjahanpur | Suresh Kumar Khanna | Bharatiya Janata Party | |
| 136 | Dadraul | Manvendra Singh | Bharatiya Janata Party | |
Lakhimpur Kheri District
| 137 | Palia | Harvinder Kumar Sahani | Bharatiya Janata Party | |
| 138 | Nighasan | Patel Ramkumar Verma | Bharatiya Janata Party | Died in September 2018 |
| 138 | Nighasan | Shashank Verma | Bharatiya Janata Party | Elected during by-election 2019 |
| 139 | Gola Gokarnnath | Arvind Giri | Bharatiya Janata Party | |
| 140 | Sri Nagar (SC) | Manju Tyagi | Bharatiya Janata Party | |
| 141 | Dhaurahra (Assembly constituency) | Awasthi Bala Prasad | Bharatiya Janata Party | |
| 142 | Lakhimpur | Yogesh Verma | Bharatiya Janata Party | |
| 143 | Kasta (SC) | Saurabh Singh, politician | Bharatiya Janata Party | |
| 144 | Mohammadi | Lokendra Pratap Singh | Bharatiya Janata Party | |
Sitapur District
| 145 | Maholi | Shashank Trivedi | Bharatiya Janata Party | |
| 146 | Sitapur | Rakesh Rathore | Bharatiya Janata Party | |
| 147 | Hargaon (SC) | Suresh Rahi | Bharatiya Janata Party | |
| 148 | Laharpur | Suneel Verma | Bharatiya Janata Party | |
| 149 | Biswan | Mahendra Singh | Bharatiya Janata Party | |
| 150 | Sevata | Gyan Tiwari | Bharatiya Janata Party | |
| 151 | Mahmoodabad | Narendra Singh Verma | Samajwadi Party | |
| 152 | Sidhauli (SC) | Hargovind Bhargava | Bahujan Samaj Party | |
| 153 | Misrikh (SC) | Ram Krishna Bhargava | Bharatiya Janata Party | |
Hardoi District
| 154 | Sawayazpur | Kunvar Madhavendra Pratap | Bharatiya Janata Party | |
| 155 | Shahabad | Rajani Tiwari | Bharatiya Janata Party | |
| 156 | Hardoi | Nitin Agarwal | Samajwadi Party | |
| 157 | Gopamau (SC) | Shyam Prakash | Bharatiya Janata Party | |
| 158 | Sandi (SC) | Prabhash Kumar | Bharatiya Janata Party | |
| 159 | Bilgram-Mallanwan | Ashish Kumar Singh | Bharatiya Janata Party | |
| 160 | Balamau (SC) | Ram Pal Verma (Hardoi) | Bharatiya Janata Party | |
| 161 | Sandila | Raj Kumar Agrawal | Bharatiya Janata Party | |
Unnao District
| 162 | Bangarmau | Kuldeep Singh Sengar | Bharatiya Janata Party | Sentenced to Life imprisonment in Unnao Rape Case on 20 December 2019 |
| 162 | Bangarmau | Shrikant Katiyar | Bharatiya Janata Party | Elected in By-Elections in November 2020 |
| 163 | Safipur (SC) | Bamba Lal Diwakar | Bharatiya Janata Party | |
| 164 | Mohan (SC) | Brijesh Kumar Rawat | Bharatiya Janata Party | |
| 165 | Unnao | Pankaj Gupta | Bharatiya Janata Party | |
| 166 | Bhagwantnagar | Hriday Narayan Dikshit | Bharatiya Janata Party | |
| 167 | Purwa | Anil Singh | Bahujan Samaj Party | |
Lucknow District
| 168 | Malihabad (SC) | Jai Devi | Bharatiya Janata Party | |
| 169 | Bakshi Kaa Talab | Avinash Trivedi | Bharatiya Janata Party | |
| 170 | Sarojini Nagar | Swati Singh | Bharatiya Janata Party | |
| 171 | Lucknow West | Suresh Kumar Shrivastav | Bharatiya Janata Party | |
| 172 | Lucknow North | Neeraj Bora | Bharatiya Janata Party | |
| 173 | Lucknow East | Ashutosh Tandan | Bharatiya Janata Party | |
| 174 | Lucknow Central | Brijesh Pathak | Bharatiya Janata Party | |
| 175 | Lucknow Cantt | Rita Bahuguna Joshi | Bharatiya Janata Party | Resigned on 24 May 2019 |
| 175 | Lucknow Cantt | Suresh Chandra Tiwari | Bharatiya Janata Party | Elected in By-Elections on 21 October 2019 |
| 176 | Mohanlalganj (SC) | Ambrish Singh Pushkar | Samajwadi Party | |
Raebareli District
| 177 | Bachhrawan (SC) | Ram Naresh Rawat | Bharatiya Janata Party | |
Amethi District
| 178 | Tiloi | Mayankeshwar Sharan Singh | Bharatiya Janata Party | |
Raebareli District
| 179 | Harchandpur | Rakesh Singh | Indian National Congress | |
| 180 | Raebareli | Aditi Singh | Indian National Congress | |
| 181 | Salon (SC) | Dal Bahadur | Bharatiya Janata Party | |
| 182 | Sareni | Dhirendra Bahadur Singh | Bharatiya Janata Party | |
| 183 | Unchahar | Manoj Kumar Pandey | Samajwadi Party | |
Amethi District
| 184 | Jagdishpur (SC) | Suresh Kumar | Bharatiya Janata Party | |
| 185 | Gauriganj | Rakesh Pratap Singh | Samajwadi Party | Resigned on 31 October 2021 |
| 186 | Amethi | Garima Singh | Bharatiya Janata Party | |
Sultanpur District
| 187 | Isauli | Abrar Ahmed | Samajwadi Party | |
| 188 | Sultanpur | Surya Bhan Singh | Bharatiya Janata Party | |
| 189 | Sadar | Sitaram Verma | Bharatiya Janata Party | |
| 190 | Lambhua | Devmani Dwivedi | Bharatiya Janata Party | |
| 191 | Kadipur (SC) | Rajesh Gautam | Bharatiya Janata Party | |
Farrukhabad District
| 192 | Kaimganj (SC) | Amar Singh | Bharatiya Janata Party | |
| 193 | Amritpur | Suhil Kumar Shakya | Bharatiya Janata Party | |
| 194 | Farrukhabad | Major Sunil Dutt Dwivedi | Bharatiya Janata Party | |
| 195 | Bhojpur | Nagendra Singh | Bharatiya Janata Party | |
Kannauj District
| 196 | Chhibramau | Archana Pandey | Bharatiya Janata Party | |
| 197 | Tirwa | Kailash Singh Rajput | Bharatiya Janata Party | |
| 198 | Kannauj (SC) | Anil Kumar Dohare | Samajwadi Party | |
Etawah District
| 199 | Jaswantnagar | Shivpal Singh Yadav | Samajwadi Party | |
| 200 | Etawah | Sarita Bhadauriya | Bharatiya Janata Party | |
| 201 | Bharthana (SC) | Savitri Katheria | Bharatiya Janata Party | |
Auraiya District
| 202 | Bidhuna | Vinay Shakya | Bharatiya Janata Party | |
| 203 | Dibiyapur | Lakhan Singh | Bharatiya Janata Party | |
| 204 | Auraiya (SC) | Ramesh Diwakar | Bharatiya Janata Party | |
Kanpur Dehat District
| 205 | Rasulabad (SC) | Nirmala Sankhwar | Bharatiya Janata Party | |
| 206 | Akbarpur-Raniya | Pratibha Shukla | Bharatiya Janata Party | |
| 207 | Sikandra | Mathura Prasad Pal | Bharatiya Janata Party | Died on 22 July 2017 |
| 207 | Sikandra | Ajit Singh Pal | Bharatiya Janata Party | Elected during by-election |
| 208 | Bhognipur | Vinod Kumar Katiyar | Bharatiya Janata Party | |
Kanpur Nagar District
| 209 | Bilhaur (SC) | Bhagwati Prasad Sagar | Bharatiya Janata Party | |
| 210 | Bithoor | Abhijeet Singh Sanga | Bharatiya Janata Party | |
| 211 | Kalyanpur | Nilima Katiyar | Bharatiya Janata Party | |
| 212 | Govindnagar | Satyadev Pachauri | Bharatiya Janata Party | Resigned on 24 May 2019 |
| 212 | Govindnagar | Surendra Maithani | Bharatiya Janata Party | Elected during By-Elections on 21 October 2019 |
| 213 | Sishamau | Hazi Irfan Solanki | Samajwadi Party | |
| 214 | Arya Nagar | Amitabh Bajpai | Samajwadi Party | |
| 215 | Kidwai Nagar | Mahesh Chandra | Bharatiya Janata Party | |
| 216 | Kanpur Cantt | Sohil Akhtar Ansari | Indian National Congress | |
| 217 | Maharajpur | Satish Mahana | Bharatiya Janata Party | |
| 218 | Ghatampur (SC) | Kamal Rani | Bharatiya Janata Party | Died in August 2020 |
| 218 | Ghatampur (SC) | Upendra Nath Paswan | Bharatiya Janata Party | Elected in By-Elections in November 2020 |
Jalaun District
| 219 | Madhaugarh | Moolchandra Singh | Bharatiya Janata Party | |
| 220 | Kalpi | Narandea Pal Singh | Bharatiya Janata Party | |
| 221 | Orai (SC) | Gauri Shankar | Bharatiya Janata Party | |
Jhansi District
| 222 | Babina | Rajeev Singh Parichha | Bharatiya Janata Party | |
| 223 | Jhansi Nagar | Ravi Sharma | Bharatiya Janata Party | |
| 224 | Mauranipur (SC) | Bihari Lal Arya | Bharatiya Janata Party | |
| 225 | Garautha | Jawahar Lal Rajput | Bharatiya Janata Party | |
Lalitpur District
| 226 | Lalitpur | Ramratan Kushwaha | Bharatiya Janata Party | |
| 227 | Mehroni (SC) | Manohar Lal | Bharatiya Janata Party | |
Hamirpur District
| 228 | Hamirpur | Ashok Kumar Singh Chandel | Bharatiya Janata Party | Sacked on 8.6.19 |
| 228 | Hamirpur | Yuvraj Singh | Bharatiya Janata Party | Elected during by-election |
| 229 | Rath (SC) | Manisha Anuragi | Bharatiya Janata Party | |
Mahoba District
| 230 | Mahoba | Rakesh Kumar Goswami | Bharatiya Janata Party | |
| 231 | Charkhari | Brijbhushan Rajpoot | Bharatiya Janata Party | |
Banda district
| 232 | Tindwari | Brajesh Kumar Prajapati | Bharatiya Janata Party | |
| 233 | Baberu | Chandrapal Kushwaha | Bharatiya Janata Party | |
| 234 | Naraini (SC) | Raj Karan Kabir | Bharatiya Janata Party | |
| 235 | Banda | Prakash Dwivedi | Bharatiya Janata Party | |
Chitrakoot District
| 236 | Chitrakoot | Chandrika Prasad Upadhyay | Bharatiya Janata Party | |
| 237 | Manikpur | R. K. Singh Patel | Bharatiya Janata Party | Resigned on 24 May 2019 |
| 237 | Manikpur | Aanand Shukla | Bharatiya Janata Party | Elected during By-Elections on 21 October 2019 |
Fatehpur District
| 238 | Jahanabad | Jai Kumar Singh Jaiki | Apna Dal (Sonelal) | |
| 239 | Bindki | Karan Singh Patel | Bharatiya Janata Party | |
| 240 | Fatehpur | Vikram Singh | Bharatiya Janata Party | |
| 241 | Ayah Shah | Vikas Gupta | Bharatiya Janata Party | |
| 242 | Husainganj | Ranvendra Pratap Singh | Bharatiya Janata Party | |
| 243 | Khaga (SC) | Krishna Paswan | Bharatiya Janata Party | |
Pratapgarh District
| 244 | Rampur Khas | Aradhana Mishra | Indian National Congress | |
| 245 | Babaganj (SC) | Vinod Kumar | Independent | |
| 246 | Kunda | Raghuraj Pratap Singh | Independent | |
| 247 | Bishwavnathganj | Rakesh Kumar Verma | Apna Dal (Sonelal) | |
| 248 | Pratapgarh | Sangam Lal Gupta | Apna Dal (Sonelal) | Resigned on 24 May 2019 |
| 248 | Pratapgarh | Rajkumar Pal | Apna Dal (Sonelal) | Elected during By-Elections on 21 October 2019 |
| 249 | Patti | Rajednra Pratap Singh | Bharatiya Janata Party | |
| 250 | Raniganj | Dhiraj Ojha | Bharatiya Janata Party | |
Kaushambi District
| 251 | Sirathu | Sheetla Prasad | Bharatiya Janata Party | |
| 252 | Manjhanpur (SC) | Lal Bahadur | Bharatiya Janata Party | |
| 253 | Chail | Nagendra Singh Patel | Bharatiya Janata Party | |
Allahabad District
| 254 | Phaphamau | Vikramjeet | Bharatiya Janata Party | |
| 255 | Soraon (SC) | Jamuna Prasad | Apna Dal (Sonelal) | |
| 256 | Phulpur | Praveen Patel | Bharatiya Janata Party | |
| 257 | Pratappur | Mohd Mujtaba Siddqui | Bahujan Samaj Party | |
| 258 | Handia | Hakim Lal Bind | Bahujan Samaj Party | |
| 259 | Meja | Neelam Karwariya | Bharatiya Janata Party | |
| 260 | Karachhana | Ujjwal Raman Singh | Samajwadi Party | |
| 261 | Allahabad West | Sidharth Nath Singh | Bharatiya Janata Party | |
| 262 | Allahabad North | Harshvardhan Bajpai | Bharatiya Janata Party | |
| 263 | Allahabad South | Nand Gopal Gupta Nandi | Bharatiya Janata Party | |
| 264 | Bara (SC) | Ajai Kumar | Bharatiya Janata Party | |
| 265 | Koraon (SC) | Rajmani Kol | Bharatiya Janata Party | |
Barabanki District
| 266 | Kursi | Sakendra Pratap Verma | Bharatiya Janata Party | |
| 267 | Ram Nagar | Sharad Kumar Awasthi | Bharatiya Janata Party | |
| 268 | Barabanki | Dharamraj Singh Yadav | Samajwadi Party | |
| 269 | Zaidpur (SC) | Upendra Singh Rawat | Bharatiya Janata Party | Resigned on 24 May 2019 |
| 269 | Zaidpur (SC) | Gaurav Kumar | Samajwadi Party | Elected during By-Elections on 21 October 2019 |
| 270 | Dariyabad | Satish chandra Sharma | Bharatiya Janata Party | |
Faizabad District
| 271 | Rudauli | Ram Chandra Yadav | Bharatiya Janata Party | |
Barabanki District
| 272 | Haidergarh (SC) | Baidnath Rawat | Bharatiya Janata Party | |
| 273 | Milkipur (SC) | Gorakh Nath | Bharatiya Janata Party | |
| 274 | Bikapur | Shobha Singh Chauhan | Bharatiya Janata Party | |
| 275 | Ayodhya | Ved Prakash Gupta | Bharatiya Janata Party | |
| 276 | Goshainganj | Indra Pratap Tiwari | Bharatiya Janata Party | |
Ambedkar Nagar District
| 277 | Katehari | Lalji Verma | Bahujan Samaj Party | |
| 278 | Tanda | Sanju Devi | Bharatiya Janata Party | |
| 279 | Alapur (SC) | Aneeta Kamal | Bharatiya Janata Party | |
| 280 | Jalalpur | Ritesh Pandey | Bahujan Samaj Party | Resigned on 24 May 2019 |
| 280 | Jalalpur | Subhash Rai | Samajwadi Party | Elected during By-Elections on 21 October 2019 |
| 281 | Akbarpur | Ram Achal Rajbhar | Bahujan Samaj Party | |
Bahraich District
| 282 | Balha (SC) | Akshaibar Lal | Bharatiya Janata Party | Resigned on 24 May 2019 |
| 282 | Balha (SC) | Saroj Sonkar | Bharatiya Janata Party | Elected during By-Elections on 21 October 2019 |
| 283 | Nanpara | Madhuri Verma | Bharatiya Janata Party | |
| 284 | Matera | Yasar Shah | Samajwadi Party | |
| 285 | Mahasi | Sureshwar Singh | Bharatiya Janata Party | |
| 286 | Bahraich | Anupma Jaiswal | Bharatiya Janata Party | |
| 287 | Payagpur | Subhash Tripathi | Bharatiya Janata Party | |
| 288 | Kaiserganj | Mukut Bihari | Bharatiya Janata Party | |
Shravasti District
| 289 | Bhinga | Mohammad Aslam | Bahujan Samaj Party | |
| 290 | Shrawasti | Ram Feran | Bharatiya Janata Party | |
Balrampur District
| 291 | Tulsipur | Kailash Nath Shukla | Bharatiya Janata Party | |
| 292 | Gainsari | Shailesh Kumar Singh | Bharatiya Janata Party | |
| 293 | Utraula | Ram Pratap alias Shashikant Verma | Bharatiya Janata Party | |
| 294 | Balrampur (SC) | Paltu Ram | Bharatiya Janata Party | |
Gonda District
| 295 | Mehnaun | Vinay Kumar Dwivedi | Bharatiya Janata Party | |
| 296 | Gonda | Prateek Bhushan Singh | Bharatiya Janata Party | |
| 297 | Katra Bazar | Bawan Singh | Bharatiya Janata Party | |
| 298 | Colonelganj | Ajay Pratap Singh | Bharatiya Janata Party | |
| 299 | Tarabganj | Prem Narayan Pandey | Bharatiya Janata Party | |
| 300 | Mankapur (SC) | Rampati Shastri | Bharatiya Janata Party | |
| 301 | Gaura | Prabhat Kumar Verma | Bharatiya Janata Party | |
Siddharthnagar District
| 302 | Shohratgarh | Amar Singh Chaudhary | Apna Dal (Sonelal) | |
| 303 | Kapilvastu (SC) | Shyam Dhani | Bharatiya Janata Party | |
| 304 | Bansi | Jai Pratap Singh | Bharatiya Janata Party | |
| 305 | Itwa | Satish Chandra Dwivedi | Bharatiya Janata Party | |
| 306 | Domariyaganj | Raghvendra Pratap Singh | Bharatiya Janata Party | |
Basti District
| 307 | Harraiya | Ajay Kumar Singh | Bharatiya Janata Party | |
| 308 | Kaptanganj | Chandra Prakash Shukla | Bharatiya Janata Party | |
| 309 | Rudhauli | Sanjay Pratap Jaiswal | Bharatiya Janata Party | |
| 310 | Basti Sadar | Dayaram Chaudhary | Bharatiya Janata Party | |
| 311 | Mahadewa (SC) | Ravi Kumar Sonkar | Bharatiya Janata Party | |
Sant Kabir Nagar District
| 312 | Menhdawal | Rakesh Singh Baghel | Bharatiya Janata Party | |
| 313 | Khalilabad | Digvijay Narayan alias Jay Chaubey | Bharatiya Janata Party | |
| 314 | Dhanghata (SC) | Sriram Chauhan | Bharatiya Janata Party | |
Maharajganj District
| 315 | Pharenda | Bajrang Bahadur Singh | Bharatiya Janata Party | |
| 316 | Nautanwa | Aman Mani Tripathi | Independent | |
| 317 | Siswa | Prem Sagar Patel | Bharatiya Janata Party | |
| 318 | Maharajganj (SC) | Jai Mangal Kanojiya | Bharatiya Janata Party | |
| 319 | Paniyara | Gyanendra Singh | Bharatiya Janata Party | |
Gorakhpur District
| 320 | Caimpiyarganj | Fateh Bahadur Singh | Bharatiya Janata Party | |
| 321 | Pipraich | Mahendra Pal Singh | Bharatiya Janata Party | |
| 322 | Gorakhpur Urban | Radha Mohan Das Agarwal | Bharatiya Janata Party | |
| 323 | Gorakhpur Rural | Bipin Singh | Bharatiya Janata Party | |
| 324 | Sahajanwa | Sheetal Pandey | Bharatiya Janata Party | |
| 325 | Khajani (SC) | Sant Prasad | Bharatiya Janata Party | |
| 326 | Chauri-Chaura | Sangeeta Yadav | Bharatiya Janata Party | |
| 327 | Bansgaon (SC) | Vimlesh Paswan | Bharatiya Janata Party | |
| 328 | Chillupar | Vinay Shankar Tiwari | Bahujan Samaj Party | |
Kushinagar District
| 329 | Khadda | Jatashankar Tripathi | Bharatiya Janata Party | |
| 330 | Padrauna | Swami Prasad Maurya | Bharatiya Janata Party | |
| 331 | Tamkuhi Raj | Ajay Kumar Lallu | Indian National Congress | |
| 332 | Fazilnagar | Ganga Singh Kushwaha | Bharatiya Janata Party | |
| 333 | Kushinagar | Rajnikant Mani Tripathi | Bharatiya Janata Party | |
| 334 | Hata | Pawan Kedia | Bharatiya Janata Party | |
| 335 | Ramkola (SC) | Ramanand Baudh | Suheldev Bharatiya Samaj Party | |
Deoria District
| 336 | Rudrapur | Jai Prakash Nishad | Bharatiya Janata Party | |
| 337 | Deoria | Janmejay Singh | Bharatiya Janata Party | Died in August 2020 |
| 337 | Deoria | Dr. Satyaprakash Mani Tripathi | Bharatiya Janata Party | Elected in By-Elections in November 2020 |
| 338 | Pathardeva | Surya Pratap Shahi | Bharatiya Janata Party | |
| 339 | Rampur Karkhana | Kamlesh Shukla | Bharatiya Janata Party | |
| 340 | Bhatpar Rani | Ashutosh Upadhyay | Samajwadi Party | |
| 341 | Salempur (SC) | Kalicharan Prasad | Bharatiya Janata Party | |
| 342 | Barhaj | Suresh Tiwari | Bharatiya Janata Party | |
Azamgarh District
| 343 | Atrauliya | Sangram Yadav | Samajwadi Party | |
| 344 | Gopalpur | Nafees Ahmad | Samajwadi Party | |
| 345 | Sagri | Bandana Singh | Bahujan Samaj Party | |
| 346 | Mubarakpur | Shah Alam | Bahujan Samaj Party | |
| 347 | Azamgarh | Durga Prasad Yadav | Samajwadi Party | |
| 348 | Nizamabad | Alambadi | Samajwadi Party | |
| 349 | Phoolpur Pawai | Arun Kumar Yadav | Bharatiya Janata Party | |
| 350 | Didarganj | Sukhdev Rajbhar | Bahujan Samaj Party | |
| 351 | Lalganj (SC) | Azad Ari Mardan | Bahujan Samaj Party | |
| 352 | Mehnagar (SC) | Kalpnath Paswan | Samajwadi Party | |
Mau District
| 353 | Madhuban | Dara Singh Chauhan | Bharatiya Janata Party | |
| 354 | Ghosi | Fagu Chauhan | Bharatiya Janata Party | Resigned on 26 July 2019 (made governor of Bihar) |
| 354 | Ghosi | Vijay Kumar Rajbhar | Bharatiya Janata Party | Elected during By-Elections on 21 October 2019 |
| 355 | Muhammadabad-Gohna (SC) | Shriram Sonkar | Bharatiya Janata Party | |
| 356 | Mau | Mukhtar Ansari | Bahujan Samaj Party | |
Ballia District
| 357 | Belthara Road (SC) | Dhananjay Kannoujia | Bharatiya Janata Party | |
| 358 | Rasara | Umashankar Singh | Bahujan Samaj Party | |
| 359 | Sikanderpur | Sanjay Yadav | Bharatiya Janata Party | |
| 360 | Phephana | Upendra Tiwari | Bharatiya Janata Party | |
| 361 | Ballia Nagar | Anand Swaroop Shukla | Bharatiya Janata Party | |
| 362 | Bansdih | Ram Govind Chaudhary | Samajwadi Party | |
| 363 | Bairia | Surendra Nath Singh | Bharatiya Janata Party | |
Jaunpur District
| 364 | Badlapur | Ramesh Chandra Mishra | Bharatiya Janata Party | |
| 365 | Shahganj | Shailendra Yadav Lalai | Samajwadi Party | |
| 366 | Jaunpur | Girish Chandra Yadav | Bharatiya Janata Party | |
| 367 | Malhani | Parasnath Yadava | Samajwadi Party | Died in June 2020 |
| 367 | Malhani | Lucky Yadav | Samajwadi Party | Elected during By-Elections in November 2020 |
| 368 | Mungra Badshahpur | Sushma Patel | Bahujan Samaj Party | |
| 369 | Machhlishahr (SC) | Jagdish Sonkar | Samajwadi Party | |
| 370 | Mariyahu | Leena Tiwari | Apna Dal (Sonelal) | |
| 371 | Zafrabad | Dr Harendra Prasad Singh | Bharatiya Janata Party | |
| 372 | Kerakat (SC) | Dinesh Choudahry | Bharatiya Janata Party | |
Ghazipur District
| 373 | Jakhanian (SC) | Triveni Ram | Suheldev Bharatiya Samaj Party | |
| 374 | Saidpur (SC) | Subhash Pasi | Samajwadi Party | |
| 375 | Ghazipur Sadar | Sangeeta Balwant | Bharatiya Janata Party | |
| 376 | Jangipur | Virendra Kumar Yadav | Samajwadi Party | |
| 377 | Zahoorabad | Om Prakash Rajbhar | Suheldev Bharatiya Samaj Party | |
| 378 | Mohammadabad | Alka Rai | Bharatiya Janata Party | |
| 379 | Zamania | Sunita | Bharatiya Janata Party | |
Chandauli District
| 380 | Mughalsarai | Sadhana Singh | Bharatiya Janata Party | |
| 381 | Sakaldiha | Prabhunarayan Yadav | Samajwadi Party | |
| 382 | Saiyadraja | Sushil Singh | Bharatiya Janata Party | |
| 383 | Chakia (SC) | Sharada Prasad | Bharatiya Janata Party | |
Varanasi District
| 384 | Pindra | Avadhesh Singh | Bharatiya Janata Party | |
| 385 | Ajagara (SC) | Kailash Nath Sonkar | Suheldev Bharatiya Samaj Party | |
| 386 | Shivpur | Anil Rajbhar | Bharatiya Janata Party | |
| 387 | Rohaniya | Surendra Narayan Singh | Bharatiya Janata Party | |
| 388 | Varanasi North | Ravindra Jaiswal | Bharatiya Janata Party | |
| 389 | Varanasi South | Neelkanth Tiwari | Bharatiya Janata Party | |
| 390 | Varanasi Cantonment | Saurabh Srivastava | Bharatiya Janata Party | |
| 391 | Sevapuri | Neel Ratan Singh Patel Neelu | Apna Dal (Sonelal) | |
Bhadohi District
| 392 | Bhadohi | Ravindra Nath Tripathi | Bharatiya Janata Party | |
| 393 | Gyanpur | Vijay Mishra | NISHAD Party | |
| 394 | Aurai (SC) | Dinanath Bhaskar | Bharatiya Janata Party | |
Mirzapur District
| 395 | Chhanbey (SC) | Rahul Prakash | Apna Dal (Sonelal) | |
| 396 | Mirzapur | Ratnakar Mishra | Bharatiya Janata Party | |
| 397 | Majhawan | Suchismita Maurya | Bharatiya Janata Party | |
| 398 | Chunar | Anurag Singh | Bharatiya Janata Party | |
| 399 | Marihan | Rama Shankar Singh | Bharatiya Janata Party | |
Sonbhadra District
| 400 | Ghorawal | Anil Kumar Maurya | Bharatiya Janata Party | |
| 401 | Robertsganj | Bhupesh Chaubey | Bharatiya Janata Party | |
| 402 | Obra (ST) | Sanjiv Kumar | Bharatiya Janata Party | |
| 403 | Duddhi (ST) | Hariram | Apna Dal (Sonelal) | |

== See also ==
- Uttar Pradesh Legislative Assembly
- 2012 Uttar Pradesh Legislative Assembly election
- 2017 Uttar Pradesh Legislative Assembly election
- 2022 Uttar Pradesh Legislative Assembly election
