= Bhadohi Lok Sabha constituency =

Lok Sabha Constituency in Uttar Pradesh

Coordinates: 25.39°N 82.57°E

Bhadohi UP-78
- Lok Sabha constituency
- Interactive Map Outlining Bhadohi Lok Sabha constituency

Constituency details
- Country: India
- Region: North India
- State: Uttar Pradesh
- Assembly constituencies: Pratappur; Handia; Bhadohi; Gyanpur; Aurai
- Established: 2008
- Reservation: None

Member of Parliament
- 18th Lok Sabha
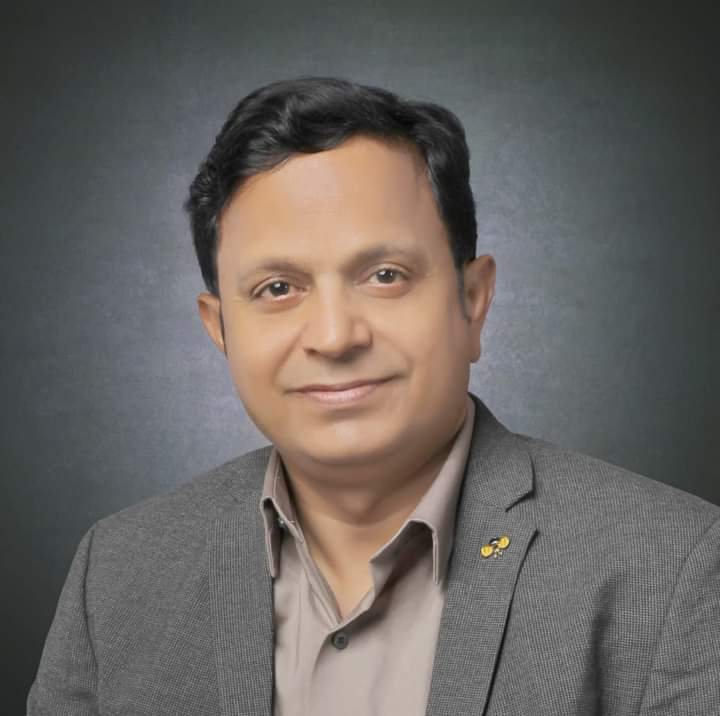
- Incumbent Mr. V. K. Bind
- Party: Bharatiya Janata Party
- Elected year: 2024

Bhadohi Lok Sabha constituency is one of the 80 Lok Sabha (parliamentary) constituencies in Uttar Pradesh state in northern India. This constituency came into existence in 2008 as a part of the implementation of delimitation of parliamentary constituencies based on the recommendations of the Delimitation Commission of India constituted in 2002.

== Assembly segments ==
Since the 2008 delimitation, Bhadohi Lok Sabha constituency comprises five Vidhan Sabha (legislative assembly) segments. These are:

No	Name	District	Member	Party	2024 lead
257	Pratappur	Prayagraj	Vijama Yadav	SP	AITC
258	Handia	Prayagraj	Hakim Lal Bind	SP	BJP
392	Bhadohi	Bhadohi	Zahid Baig	SP	BJP
393	Gyanpur	Bhadohi	Vipul Dubey	NISHAD	BJP
394	Aurai (SC)	Bhadohi	Dinanath Bhashkar	BJP	BJP

== Members of Parliament ==
Year	Member	Party
Till 2008 : Constituency did not exist
2009	Gorakh Nath Pandey	Bahujan Samaj Party
2014	Virendra Singh Mast	Bharatiya Janata Party
2019	Ramesh Chand Bind	Bharatiya Janata Party
2024	Vinod Kumar Bind	Bharatiya Janata Party

== Election results ==
=== General Election 2024 ===
2024 Indian general elections:Bhadohi
Party	Candidate	Votes	%	±%
BJP	Vinod Kumar Bind	459,982	42.39	▼6.67
AITC	Lalitesh Pati Tripathi	415,910	38.33	▲38.33
BSP	Harishankar	155,053	14.29	▼30.56
NOTA	None of the Above	11,229	1.03	▲0.26
Majority		44,072	4.06	▼0.14
Turnout		10,84,993	53.24	▼0.27
BJP hold		Swing		

=== General Election 2019 ===
2019 Indian general elections: Bhadohi
Party	Candidate	Votes	%	±%
BJP	Rameshchand Bind	510,029	49.05	▲7.95
BSP	Rangnath Mishra	4,66,414	44.85	▲19.85
INC	Ramakant Yadav	25,604	2.46	▲0.16
NOTA	None of the Above	9,087	0.87	▼0.04
Majority		43,615	4.20	▼11.90
Turnout		10,39,390	53.51	▼0.03
BJP hold		Swing		

=== General Election 2014 ===
2014 Indian general elections: Bhadohi
Party	Candidate	Votes	%	±%
BJP	Virendra Singh Mast	403,695	41.10	−−−
BSP	Rakeshdhar Tripathi	2,45,554	25.00	−−−
SP	Seema Mishra	2,38,712	24.30	−−−
JD(U)	Tej Bahadur Yadav	26,995	2.75	−−−
INC	Sartaj Imam	22,573	2.30	−−−
NOTA	None of the Above	8,969	0.91	−−−
Majority		1,58,039	16.10	
Turnout		9,82,154	53.54	
BJP gain from BSP		Swing		

== See also ==
- Sant Ravidas Nagar district
- Mirzapur Lok Sabha constituency
- Phulpur Lok Sabha constituency
- List of constituencies of the Lok Sabha
