= Handia =

Handia may refer to:

- Handia, Uttar Pradesh, India
  - Handia Assembly constituency, a constituency of the Uttar Pradesh Legislative Assembly
- Handia, Madhya Pradesh, India
- Handia (drink), from India
- Handia (film), or Giant, a 2017 Spanish Basque-language film

== See also ==
- Handi, a type of cooking pot from India
