= Gorakh Nath Pandey =

Indian politician

- गोरख नाथ पाण्डेय

Member: 15th Lok Sabha
- In office 2009-2014
- Succeeded by: Virendra Singh Mast
- Constituency: Bhadohi (Lok Sabha constituency)

Personal details
- Born: 25 April 1951 (age 74) Vill-Berawa Paharpur, BHADOHI Uttar Pradesh
- Party: Bharatiya Janta Party
- Spouse: late smt.Shiv Devi
- Children: 4

GorakhNath Pandey (Hindi - गोरखनाथ पाण्डेय ) (Born 25 April 1951) is an Indian politician, representing the Bharatiya Janta Party. He represented Bhadohi constituency in the 15th Lok Sabha on a Bahujan Samaj Party ticket. He was also MLA in 1996-2002 from Gyanpur constituency on a BJP ticket. Currently he is a member of National Council BJP & UP BJP Working Committee. He was teacher before joining the politics.
