= Sabhakunwar Kushawaha =

Member of Uttar Pradesh Legislative Assembly

Sabha Kunwar Kushwaha
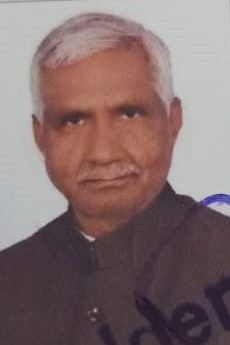

Member of the Uttar Pradesh Legislative Assembly
- Incumbent
- Assumed office 2022
- Constituency: Bhatpar Rani Assembly constituency

Personal details
- Party: Bharatiya Janata Party

Sabhakunwar Kushawaha (born 1955) is an Indian politician from Uttar Pradesh. He is a member of the Uttar Pradesh Legislative Assembly for Bhatpar Rani constituency number 340. He became an M.L.A. in the May 2022 Uttar Pradesh Legislative Assembly election representing Bharatiya Janata Party.

== Early life and education ==
Kushwaha is from Bhatpar Rani, Deoria district. He is born in an agricultural family to Ram Kishun. He completed his post graduation at Madan Mohan Malviya P.G. College, Bhatpar Rani, Deoria in 1986.

== Career ==
Kushwaha made his political debut in 2002 for Vidhan Sabha which he lost. Since then he was a candidate for elections in 2007, 2012, 2013 (by-election), 2014 (Lok- sabha), 2017 but lost all of these. He became an MLA for the first time in 2022 when he joined the BJP. He won the 2022 Uttar Pradesh Legislative Assembly election representing Bharatiya Janata Party from Bhatpar Rani Assembly constituency. He polled 91,282 votes and defeated Ashutosh Upadhyay of Samajwadi Party by a margin of 18,082 votes.
