= Rangnath Mishra =

Indian politician (born 1959)

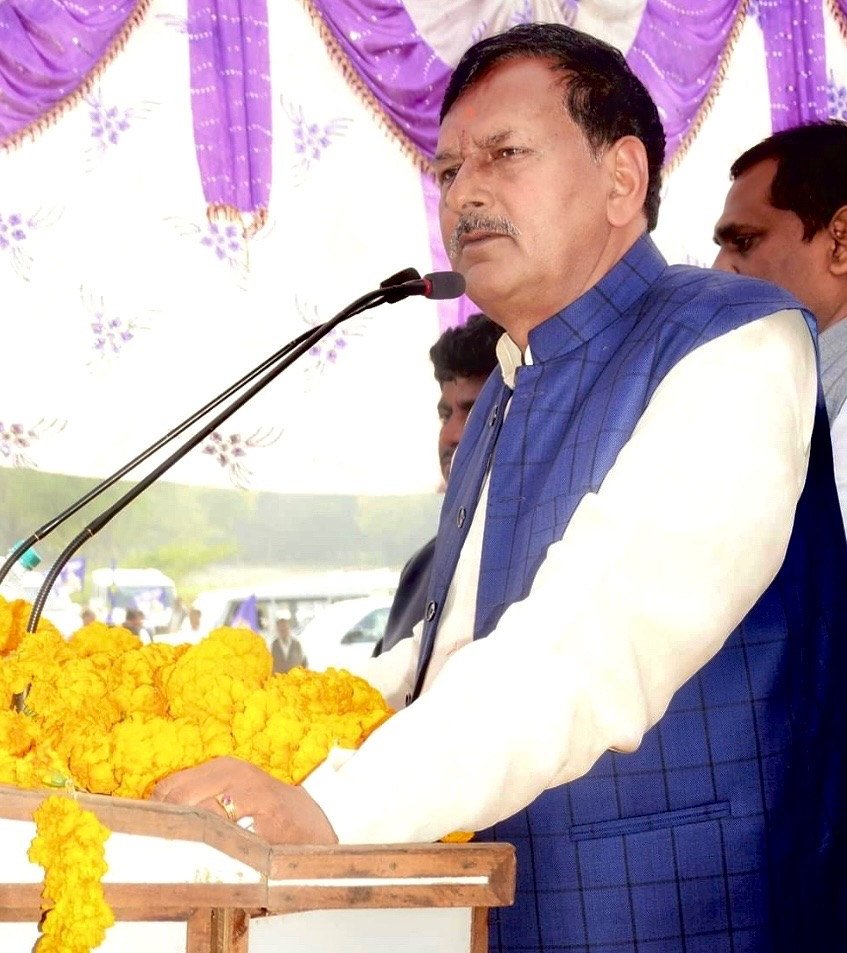

Cabinet Minister of Uttar Pradesh MLA, 15th Legislative Assembly
- In office 2007–2012
- Minister: Secondary Education
- Constituency: Aurai

Minister of State MLA, 13th Legislative Assembly of Uttar Pradesh
- In office 1996-2002
- Minister: Home, Electricity, Health and Forest

MLA, 12th Legislative Assembly of Uttar Pradesh and 14th Legislative Assembly of Uttar Pradesh

Personal details
- Born: 1 July 1959 (age 66) Sahsepur, Uttar Pradesh, India
- Party: Bharatiya Janata Party
- Profession: Politician

Rangnath Mishra (born 1 July 1959) is an Indian Politician belonging to Bharatiya Janata Party (BJP) and hails from District Bhadohi, Uttar Pradesh. He has been two times minister in the Government of Uttar Pradesh and four times Member of Legislative Assembly of Uttar Pradesh Vidhan Sabha representing Aurai constituency. He has notably served as Cabinet Minister for Secondary Education and Minister of State for Home in the Government of Uttar Pradesh.

== Early life ==
Rangnath Mishra was born in village Sahsepur of Bhadohi district (then in District Varanasi), Uttar Pradesh to father Keshav Prasad Mishra and mother Indrawati Devi. He is the fifth of the six children in his family. He has three sons and three daughters.

== Political career ==
Rangnath Mishra started his career as a member of Akhil Bharatiya Vidyarthi Parishad (ABVP) and Rashtriya Swayamsevak Sangh (RSS) member. In 1980 he joined Bharatiya Janta Party (BJP). Mishra was appointed as Varanasi District president for Bharatiya Janta Party (BJP) and played a significant role in creation of Bhadohi district from Varanasi. He was also appointed as the first president of the BJP from Bhadohi District In 1991 Uttar Pradesh Legislative Assembly Election, he debuted as Bharatiya Janata Party (BJP) candidate from Aurai Constituency and polled second to a Janta Dal party's candidate. In 1993 elections, he again contested from Aurai and became first-time MLA by defeating Bahujan Samaj Party's Raj Kumari. In 1996, he was again elected MLA from the constituency by defeating Samajwadi Party's candidate Jaheed. He was appointed as a Minister of State in the Kalyan Singh's, Ram Prakash Gupta's and Rajnath Singh's cabinet of 1996 Uttar Pradesh's BJP Government and held various portfolios intermittently such as Home, Electricity, Health and Forest. He was then popularly known to provide 24-hour electricity exclusively to his district Bhadohi. In 2002 assembly elections, he lost to BSP's Uday Bhan Singh. In 2005, after disqualification of the incumbent MLA, Mishra contested the Aurai Assembly bye-election on the Bahujan Samaj Party (BSP) ticket after switching from BJP and won by defeating Samajwadi Party's Rita Singh. In 2007 Assembly Elections, he again contested from the said constituency and won by defeating Samajwadi Party's Rita Singh again. He was sworn-in as a Minister of State (Independent Charge) in the Mayawati's cabinet and held Rural Development portfolio. Later he was elevated as a cabinet minister with the portfolio of Secondary Education. In 2012, after the Aurai Constituency was reservered Mishra contested from adjoining Mirzapur constituency where he polled second to Samajwadi Party's Kailash Nath Chaurasia. In 2017 elections, Mishra contested from Bhadohi Assembly Constituency where he polled as second runner-up. In 2019 general elections, Mishra contested as a Mahagathbandhan alliance candidate from Bhadohi Parliamentary Constituency where he lost to BJP's Ramesh Chand Bind by a margin of 43,615 votes. In 2020, Mishra was appointed as BSP's co-ordinator for Mirzapur Division as part of BSP's strategy to muster Brahmin's vote. In 2022, he rejoined BJP.

== Positions held ==
Year	Description
1993 - 1996	Elected to 12th Uttar Pradesh Legislative Assembly
1996 -2001	Elected to 13th Uttar Pradesh Legislative Assembly (2nd Term): Minister of State for Home, Health, Forest and Electricity
1997-1998	Adhishthata Mandal and Committee on Delegated Legislation
2005 - 2007	Elected to 14th Uttar Pradesh Legislative Assembly (3rd Term) (Bye-election)
2007 - 2012	Elected to 15th Uttar Pradesh Legislative Assembly (4th Term): Minister of State (Independent Charge) for Rural Development (13.05.2007 to 17.10.2007); Cabinet Minister for Secondary Education (18.10.2007 to 15.03.2012)

== Legal Issues ==
=== LACCFED Scam ===
In February 2012, a First Information Report (FIR) was registered with Husainganj Police Station Lucknow by the General Manager of the Uttar Pradesh Government recognized construction agency named Labour and Construction Co-operative Federation (LACCFED) alleging embezzlement by its management. Formed under the Co-operative department, LACCFED was entitled to undertake small construction/renovation work of different government departments not exceeding Rs 10 lakh per contract. The investigation into the case gained momentum against Mishra after the Akhilesh Yadav's government came to power in March 2012 when the case was transferred to the co-operative cell of the U.P. Police, although Mishra alleged political vendetta. Mishra's name came into light after this change of this government and was first time inducted as an accused in the supplementary chargesheet in March 2013. Mayawati, BSP head, had alleged political vendetta by Akhilesh Government. However, in February 2015, the Special Court Lucknow in the matter honorarily acquitted Mishra including three other former ministers while convicting seven others and summoning 14 more accused. The judge expressed serious dissatisfaction over the manner of investigation led by the investigating officer Aditya Prakash Gangwar and was astonished to see that the probe was conducted under influence and the investigators were biased for personal reasons. The court also questioned the manner of probe with regard to the seven acquitted accused and warned the investigators not to do such investigations in future. It directed to send the copy of the judgement to the principal secretary home for proper action in the matter.

=== Disproportionate Assets ===
After the Akhilesh Yadav's government came to power in March 2012, Mishra was subject to another political prosecution for having assets disproportionate to his known source of income. Mishra was accused by the Uttar Pradesh Vigilance Department that he amassed a wealth of more than four crores disproportionate to his known sources of income while a minister from 2007 to 2011. However, on 29 September 2021 on trial in the aforesaid case the Special Judge Allahabad honorarily acquitted Mishra observing that the investigating officer calculated most of the assets of Mishra acquired before the alleged check period.

=== Enforcement Directorate Case ===
In 2014, the Enforcement Directorate (ED) had registered a case of money laundering under the Prevention of Money Laundering Act, 2002 (PMLA) on the basis of predicate offence in the Disproportionate Assets case. On being acquitted in the predicate offence on 29 September 2021, Mishra challenged the ED case in the Allahabad High Court Lucknow bench. On 18 May 2023 the court stayed the investigation of ED on the ground of its maintainability in light of three-judges bench ruling of the Supreme Court of India in Vijay Madanlal Choudhary vs Union Of India (27 July 2022). On 19 September 2024, the ED conceding to the ruling filed the closure report before the High Court giving clean chit to Mishra, thus disposing of the case.
