= Sanjay Yadav =

Sanjay Yadav may refer to:

- Sanjay Yadav (cricketer) (born 1995), Indian cricketer
- Sanjay Yadav (judge) (born 1959), Indian judge
- Sanjay Yadav (Uttar Pradesh politician) (born 1979), Indian politician
- Sanjay Yadav (Bihar politician), Member of Rajya Sabha from Bihar
