= Pawan Kedia =

Indian politician

Mohan Verma

MLA, 17th Legislative Assembly of Uttar Pradesh
- In office March 2017 – March 2022
- Preceded by: Radheshyam Singh
- Succeeded by: Mohan Verma
- Constituency: Hata (Assembly constituency)

Personal details
- Born: 1 December 1965 (age 60) Hata, Uttar Pradesh
- Party: Bharatiya Janata Party
- Spouse: Amita Kedia (m. 1991)
- Children: 1
- Parent: Sitaram Kedia
- Education: M.Com.
- Alma mater: Gorakhpur University
- Occupation: MLA
- Profession: Industrialist

Pawan Kumar Kedia is an Indian politician and a member of 17th Legislative Assembly of Uttar Pradesh of India. He represents the Hata (Assembly constituency) in Kushinagar district of Uttar Pradesh and is a member of the Bhartiya Janata Party.

== Early life and education ==
Kedia was born on 1 December 1965 in Hata, Kushinagar district of Uttar Pradesh to his father Sitaram Kedia. He married Amita Kedia in 1991, they have a son. He belongs to Vaishya community. He got M.Com. degree from Gorakhpur University in 1990.

== Political career ==
Kedia started his political journey as Head of Department (HOD) of Rashtriya Swayamsevak Sangh and Vishva Hindu Parishad from 1994 to 2010. In 16th Legislative Assembly of Uttar Pradesh (2012) elections, he contested from Hata (Assembly constituency) as an Independent politician. Still, he lost to SP's Radheshyam Singh and stood in sixth with 8,914 (4.81%) votes.

In 17th Legislative Assembly of Uttar Pradesh (2017) elections, he got a ticket by Bharatiya Janata Party from Hata. He was elected MLA by defeating Samajwadi Party candidate Radheshyam Singh by a margin of 53,076 votes.

== Posts held ==
#	From	To	Position	Comments
01	March 2017	March 2022	Member, 17th Legislative Assembly of Uttar Pradesh	
