= Itiha Ibrahimpur =

Itinha Ibrahimpur
- Village
- Location in Uttar Pradesh, India Itinha Ibrahimpur (India)
- Coordinates: 25.2099100°N 82.3662700°E
- Country: India
- State: Uttar Pradesh
- District: Prayagraj

Area
  - Total: 243.07 km^{2} (93.85 sq mi)

Population
  - Total: 1,620
  - Density: 6.66/km^{2} (17.3/sq mi)

Languages Awadhi A local version of Hindi, Shri Ramcharit Manas was written by Tulasidas in Awadhi.
  - Official: Hindi
- Time zone: UTC+5:30 (IST)
- PIN: 221503
- Telephone code: 05414
- Vehicle registration: UP 70
- Nearest city: Prayagraj
- Sex ratio: 871 ♂/♀

Itiha Ibrahimpur is a village in Handia Tehsil in Prayagraj District of Uttar Pradesh, India, situated on the Ganges river. It belongs to Prayagraj division. It is located 4 km from Handia, 42 km east of Prayagraj and 242 km from the state capital Lucknow.
