= Virendra Singh Mast =

Indian politician

Member of Parliament, Lok Sabha
- In office 2019–2024
- Preceded by: Bharat Singh
- Succeeded by: Sanatan Pandey
- Constituency: Ballia
- In office 2014–2019
- Preceded by: Gorakh Nath Pandey
- Succeeded by: Ramesh Chand Bind
- Constituency: Bhadohi
- In office 1998–1999
- Preceded by: Phoolan Devi
- Succeeded by: Phoolan Devi
- Constituency: Mirzapur
- In office 1991–1996
- Preceded by: Yusuf Beg
- Succeeded by: Phoolan Devi
- Constituency: Mirzapur

Personal details
- Born: 21 October 1956 (age 69) Ballia, Uttar Pradesh, India
- Party: Bharatiya Janata Party
- Spouse: Renu Singh (m. 1981)
- Children: 1 son, 2 daughters
- Parents: Ramnath Singh (father); Draupadi Singh (mother)
- Education: Bachelor of Arts
- Alma mater: Banaras Hindu University
- Profession: Agriculturist, Politician

Virendra Singh Mast (21 October 1956) is a member of the Bharatiya Janata Party who won the 2019 Indian general elections from the Ballia (Lok Sabha constituency). He is national president of BJP Kisan Morcha.

== Early life and education ==
He was born to Ramnath Singh and Draupadi Singh in Dokati village, Ballia district, Uttar Pradesh. He completed his Bachelor of Arts at a college affiliated with Banaras Hindu University. He married Renu Singh on 19 June 1981.

== Career ==
Singh started his political career in 1988 as the District President of Bharatiya Janata Yuva Morcha and remained in office till 1992.

In 1991, he was elected to the 10th Lok Sabha from Mirzapur Lok Sabha constituency. He lost the Mirzapur seat to Phoolan Devi of Samajwadi Party in 1996 but regained it in the 1998 Indian general election. He won for the third time in May 2014 from the neighbouring Bhadohi Lok Sabha constituency, defeating his nearest rival Rakeshdhar Tripathi of Bahujan Samaj Party by 158,039 votes.

He became an MP for the fourth term, winning the 2019 Indian general election in Uttar Pradesh representing the Bharatiya Janata Party from Ballia Lok Sabha constituency. He polled 469,114 votes and defeated his nearest rival Sanatan Pandey of Samajwadi Party by a margin of 15,519 votes.
