= Sikanderpur Assembly constituency =

Assembly constituency in Uttar Pradesh

Coordinates: 26.03°N 84.02°E

Sikanderpur
- Constituency No. 359 for the Uttar Pradesh Legislative Assembly

Constituency details
- Country: India
- Region: North India
- State: Uttar Pradesh
- District: Ballia
- Total electors: 307,974
- Reservation: None

Member of Legislative Assembly
- 18th Uttar Pradesh Legislative Assembly
- Incumbent Mohammed Ziauddin Rizvi
- Party: Samajwadi Party
- Elected year: 2022

Sikanderpur is a constituency of the Uttar Pradesh Legislative Assembly covering the city of Sikanderpur in the Ballia district of Uttar Pradesh, India.

Sikanderpur is one of five assembly constituencies in the Salempur Lok Sabha constituency. Since 2008, this assembly constituency is numbered 359 amongst 403 constituencies.

== Members of Legislative Assembly ==
Year	Member	Party
1962	Jagganath Chaudhari	Indian National Congress
1967	Rajaram Singh	Independent
1969	Nirbhai Narain Singh	Independent
1974	Nirbhai Narain Singh	Indian National Congress
1977	Sheo Mangal Singh	Janata Party
1980	Nirbhai Narain Singh	Indian National Congress (I)
1985	Sheo Mangal Singh	Lokdal
1989	Rajdhari	Janata Party
1991	Markandey Singh	Indian National Congress
1993	Deena Nath Chaudhary	Samajwadi Party
1996	Rajdhari	Social Action Party
2002	Ziauddin Rizvi	Samajwadi Party
2007	Sribhagwan Pathak	Bahujan Samaj Party
2012	Ziauddin Rizvi	Samajwadi Party
2017	Sanjay Yadav	Bharatiya Janata Party
2022	Ziauddin Rizvi	Samajwadi Party

== Election results ==
=== 2027 ===
2027 Uttar Pradesh Legislative Assembly election: Sikanderpur
Party	Candidate	Votes	%	±%
INDIA				
NDA				
BSP				
NOTA	None of the above			
Majority				
Turnout				
gain from		Swing		

=== 2022 ===
2022 Uttar Pradesh Legislative Assembly election: Sikanderpur
Party	Candidate	Votes	%	±%
SP	Jiyauddin Rizvi	75,446	42.75	+14.81
BJP	Sanjay Yadav	63,591	36.03	−6.21
BSP	Sanjeev Kumar Verma	29,604	16.78	−4.46
Jan Adhikar Party	Ashok	2,060	1.17	−0.2
INC	Brijesh Singh	1,857	1.05	
NOTA	None of the above	1,089	0.62	−0.07
Majority		11,855	6.72	−7.58
Turnout		176,471	57.3	−0.1
SP gain from BJP		Swing		

=== 2017 ===
Bharatiya Janta Party candidate Sanjay Yadav won in last Assembly election of 2017 Uttar Pradesh Legislative Elections defeating Samajwadi Party candidate Mohammed Ziauddin Rizvi by a margin of 23,548 votes.

2017 Uttar Pradesh Legislative Assembly Election: Sikanderpu
Party	Candidate	Votes	%	±%
BJP	Sanjay Yadav	69,536	42.24	
SP	Ziauddin Rizwi	45,988	27.94	
BSP	Rajnarain	34,968	21.24	
Independent	Arvind Rai	2,936	1.78	
Jan Adhikar Party	Satyendra Yadav	2,260	1.37	
Independent	Munna Chauhan	2,066	1.26	
NOTA	None of the above	1,122	0.69	
Majority		23,548	14.3	
Turnout		164,615	57.4	

== Members of Legislative Assembly ==
#	Term	Member of Legislative Assembly	Party	From	To	Days	Comment
01	3rd Vidhan Sabha	Jagarnath	Indian National Congress	March 1962	March 1967	1,828	
02	4th Vidhan Sabha	R. Ram	Independent	March 1967	April 1968	402	
03	5th Vidhan Sabha	Nirbhay Narayan Singh Alias Lal Babu	Independent	February 1969	March 1974	1,832	
04	6th Vidhan Sabha	Nirbhay Narayan Singh Alias Lal Babu	Indian National Congress	March 1974	April 1977	1,153	
05	7th Vidhan Sabha	Shiv Mangal Singh	Janata Party	June 1977	February 1980	969	
06	8th Vidhan Sabha	Nirbhay Narayan Singh Alias Lal Babu	Indian National Congress (Indira)	June 1980	March 1985	1,735	
07	9th Vidhan Sabha	Shiv Mangal Singh	Lok Dal	March 1985	November 1989	1,725	
08	10th Vidhan Sabha	Rajdhari	Janata Party	December 1989	April 1991	488	
09	11th Vidhan Sabha	Markandey	Indian National Congress	June 1991	December 1992	533	
10	12th Vidhan Sabha	Deena Nath Chaudhary	Samajwadi Party	December 1993	October 1995	693	
11	13th Vidhan Sabha	Rajdhari	Social Action Party	October 1996	March 2002	1,967	
12	14th Vidhan Sabha	Mohammed Ziauddin Rizvi	Samajwadi Party	February 2002	May 2007	1,902	
13	15th Vidhan Sabha	Shri Bhagwan	Bahujan Samaj Party	May 2007	March 2012	1,736	
14	16th Vidhan Sabha	Mohammed Ziauddin Rizvi	Samajwadi Party	March 2012	March 2017	1,829	
15	17th Vidhan Sabha	Sanjay Yadav	Bhartiya Janata Party	March 2017	March 2022	3476	
16	18th Vidhan Sabha	Mohammed Ziauddin Rizvi	Samajwadi Party	March 2022	Incumbent		
