= Ram Chandra Maurya =

Indian politician

Member of the Uttar Pradesh Legislative Assembly
- In office 1997–2002
- Constituency: Majhawan

Personal details
- Born: 16 January 1950 Mirzapur, Uttar Pradesh
- Party: Bharatiya Janata Party
- Occupation: MLA
- Profession: Politician

Ram Chandra Maurya was an Indian politician and member of Uttar Pradesh Legislative Assembly from Majhawan Assembly constituency. He was a member of Bharatiya Janata Party and was elected to 13th Uttar Pradesh Legislative Assembly via 1996 Assembly elections. Maurya was a resident of Mirzapur district of Uttar Pradesh. His daughter-in-law Suchismita Maurya also represented the Majhawan Assembly constituency in Uttar Pradesh Legislative Assembly.

== Political career ==
Ram Chandra Maurya was born on 16 January 1950 to Sarju Prasad in Mirzapur district of Uttar Pradesh in an Other Backward Class Hindu family. He completed his post graduate degree and married Vidyawati Devi in 1967. He had one son and three daughters with her. Maurya's daughter-in-law Suchismita Maurya contested the 2017 Uttar Pradesh Assembly elections on the ticket of Bharatiya Janata Party and was victorious. Maurya was also an industrialist besides being an active politician. In September–October 1996 elections, he was elected from Majhawan Assembly constituency, for the first time, as a candidate of Bharatiya Janata Party. In this election, he got 54,472 votes and defeated Bhagwat Pal of Bahujan Samaj Party.

In 2013, he was shot in leg and looted by unknown assailants outside a mall, where he was waiting in his BMW car.
