= Surya Bhan Singh =

Indian politician

MLA, 17th Legislative Assembly
- Incumbent
- Assumed office 2017
- Constituency: Sultanpur, Uttar Pradesh

Personal details
- Party: Bharatiya Janata Party
- Occupation: MLA
- Profession: Politician

Surya Bhan Singh is an Indian politician and a member of 17th Legislative Assembly, Uttar Pradesh of India. He represents the ‘Sultanpur ’ constituency in Sultanpur district of Uttar Pradesh.

== Political career ==
Surya Bhan Singh contested Uttar Pradesh Assembly Election as Bharatiya Janata Party candidate and defeated his close contestant Mujeed Ahmad from Bahujan Samaj Party with a margin of 32,393 votes.

== Posts held ==
#	From	To	Position	Comments
01	2017	Incumbent	Member, 17th Legislative Assembly	
