= Vinod Kumar Bind =

Member of the Uttar Pradesh Legislative Assembly

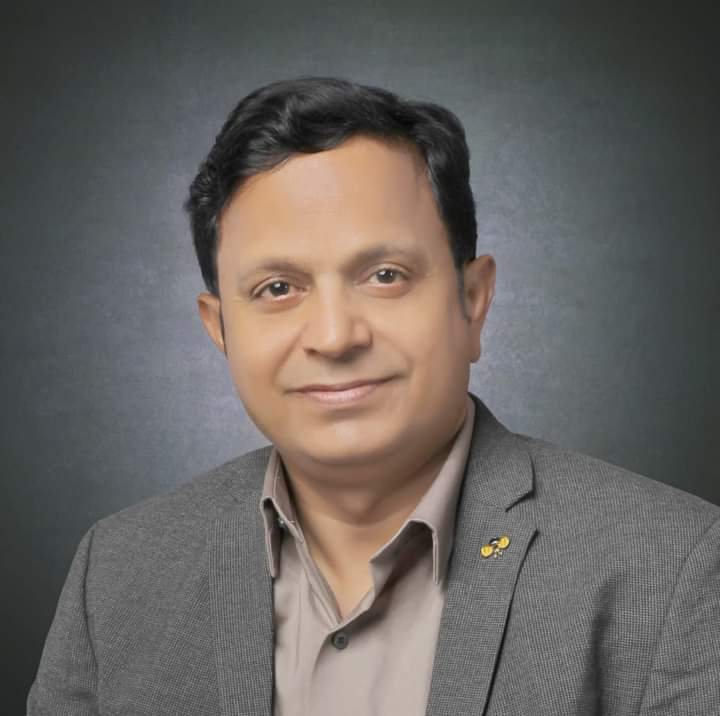
- Dr Vinod Bind in 2024

Member of Parliament, Lok Sabha
- Preceded by: Ramesh Bind
- Constituency: Bhadohi

Member of the Uttar Pradesh Legislative Assembly
- In office March 2022 – June 2024
- Constituency: Majhawan

Personal details
- Born: Uttar Pradesh, India
- Party: Bharatiya Janata Party
- Other political affiliations: National Democratic Alliance (2022–present)
- Spouse: Reena Bind
- Children: Ashutosh, Anjali, Amitesh, Rinki
- Education: University of Allahabad
- Occupation: Medical doctor (MBBS, MS)
- Profession: Politician

Vinod Kumar Bind is an Indian politician and medical practitioner, affiliated with the Bharatiya Janata Party (BJP). He has been involved in public service and healthcare initiatives, particularly in the states of Uttar Pradesh and Bihar, where he also serves as a Member of Parliament.

== Early life and education ==
Bind was born in 1974 in Uttar Pradesh. His father, Sachanu Ram Bind and mother, Rama Devi, influenced Vinod’s upbringing.

Bind pursued a career in medicine. He earned his Bachelor of Medicine and Bachelor of Surgery (MBBS) from MLN Medical College, Allahabad and Master of Surgery degree from Sarojini Naidu Medical College Agra, an institution in Uttar Pradesh. During his academic years, he was involved in health awareness drives and free medical camps.

== Political career ==
He got a ticket from the Samajwadi Party to run in the 2022 elections from the Gyanpur assembly seat, But Bind declined the ticket after two days. He then joined the NISHAD Party and contested and won the election from the Majhawan Assembly constituency in the Mirzapur district.

Bind joined the Bharatiya Janata Party (BJP), drawn to its focus on development, national security, and inclusive governance.

In the 2024 Indian General Elections, he was nominated as the BJP candidate from Bhadohi (Lok Sabha constituency). His campaign focused on improving healthcare infrastructure, education, and employment opportunities in the region. Leveraging his medical background, he also advocated for better public health systems and rural wellness initiatives.

He won the election, becoming a Member of Parliament in the 18th Lok Sabha.

== Professional career ==
Before entering politics, Bind worked as a medical doctor in rural populations. He ran medical outreach programs. Through Rama Devi Hospital in Mughalsarai, Mirzapur, and Gopiganj, he provided free medical treatment to the underprivileged in rural areas. In addition to his healthcare efforts, he also organized mass marriage ceremonies for underprivileged families.

== Ideologies ==
Bind upholds a blend of political nationalism and social reform, rooted in the principles of the Bharatiya Janata Party. As both a medical professional and parliamentarian, he emphasises accessible healthcare, rural development, and educational empowerment for marginalised communities, particularly in Uttar Pradesh and Bihar. He advocates for:

- Affordable and quality healthcare in rural and semi-urban areas, drawing from his own background in medicine.
- Empowerment of backward and Scheduled Castes, aiming to bridge historical socio-economic gaps through education and welfare programs. Good governance and transparency in administration, in alignment with the BJP’s broader mission of development with integrity.
- Youth and skill development, encouraging vocational training and employment-oriented education for regional upliftment.
- Cultural pride and regional identity, promoting local heritage while fostering national unity.

Bind also supports government-led initiatives such as Ayushman Bharat, Ujjwala Yojana, Nari Shakti, Mahila Sashaktikaran, PM Awas Yojana', Digital India, and Swachh Bharat Abhiyan and integrates these schemes into his constituency work.

== Posts held ==
#	From	To	Position	Comments
01	2022	2024	Member of Uttar Pradesh Legislative Assembly	
02	2024	Incumbent	Member of Parliament, 18th Lok Sabha	

== Government Committee Member ==
- Parliamentary Standing Committee on Health and Family Welfare
- Consultative Committee on Consumer Affairs
- Consultative Committee for the Ministry of Petroleum and Natural Gas

== See also ==
- 18th Uttar Pradesh Assembly
- Majhawan Assembly constituency
- Uttar Pradesh Legislative Assembly
