= Jatashankar Tripathi =

Indian politician

MLA, 17th Legislative Assembly of Uttar Pradesh
- Incumbent
- Assumed office March 2017
- Preceded by: Vijay Kumar Dubey
- Constituency: Khadda (Assembly constituency)

Personal details
- Born: 7 January 1968 (age 58) Chaturbanduari, Gorakhpur, Uttar Pradesh
- Party: Bharatiya Janata Party
- Parent: Umashankar Tripathi
- Education: Postgraduate
- Alma mater: Gorakhpur University
- Occupation: MLA
- Profession: Politician

Jatashanker Tripathi is an Indian politician and a member of 17th Legislative Assembly of Kushinagar, Uttar Pradesh of India. He represents the Khadda constituency of Uttar Pradesh and is a member of the Bharatiya Janata Party.

== Political career ==
Tripathi is a member of the 17th Legislative Assembly of Uttar Pradesh. He is a member of the Bharatiya Janata Party and since 2017, has represented the Khadda constituency. he defeated Bahujan Samaj Party candidate Vijay Pratap Kushwaha by a margin of 38,497 votes.

== Posts held ==
#	From	To	Position	Comments
01	March 2017	Incumbent	Member, 17th Legislative Assembly	

== See also ==
- Uttar Pradesh Legislative Assembly
