= Hata Assembly constituency =

Constituency of the Uttar Pradesh legislative assembly in India

Coordinates: 26.74°N 83.74°E

Hata
- Constituency No. 334 for the Uttar Pradesh Legislative Assembly

Constituency details
- Country: India
- Region: North India
- State: Uttar Pradesh
- District: Kushinagar
- Reservation: None

Member of Legislative Assembly
- 18th Uttar Pradesh Legislative Assembly
- Incumbent Mohan Verma
- Party: Bharatiya Janta Party
- Elected year: 2022

Hata is a constituency of the Uttar Pradesh Legislative Assembly covering the Hata Nagar Palika in the Kushinagar district of Uttar Pradesh, India.

Hata is one of five assembly constituencies in the Kushi Nagar Lok Sabha constituency. Since 2008, this assembly constituency is numbered 334 amongst 403 constituencies.

This seat belonged to Bharatiya Janta Party candidate Pawan Kedia, who won in last Assembly election of 2017 Uttar Pradesh Legislative Elections by defeating Samajwadi Party candidate Radheshyam Singh by a margin of 53,076 votes.

== Members of Legislative Assembly ==
Year	Member	Party
1957	Surya Bali	Indian National Congress
1962	Bankey Lal	Praja Socialist Party
1967	Raja Ram	Indian National Congress
1969	Bankey Lal	Samyukta Socialist Party
1974	Gulab Chand Sonkar	Indian National Congress
1977	Basant	Janata Party
1980	Kuber	Janata Party (Secular)
1985	Videshi Prasad Bharti	Indian National Congress
1989	Kripa Shankar Arya	Janata Dal
1991	Ramapati	Bharatiya Janata Party
1993	Ramapati	Bharatiya Janata Party
1996	Ram Nakshatra	Janata Dal
2002	Ramapati	Bharatiya Janata Party
2007	Ramapati	Bharatiya Janata Party
2012	Radheshyam Singh	Samajwadi Party
2017	Pawan Kedia	Bharatiya Janata Party
2022	Mohan Verma	Bharatiya Janata Party

== Election results ==
2012 Assembly elections: Hata
Party	Candidate	Votes	%	±%
SP	Radheshyam Singh	55,591	30.02	Steady
BSP	Virendra	38,923	21.02	Steady
Independent	Jamwanti	27,388	14.19	Steady
BJP	Jaswant Alias Atul	9,389	5.07	Steady
PECP	Kashinath	9,081	4.90	Steady
Independent	Pawan Kedia	8,914	4.81	Steady
INC	Ram Ashrya	6,588	3.56	Steady
SBSP	Anshuman	6,328	3.42	Steady
	Remaining 17 Candidates	22,986	12.41	Steady
Majority		16,668	9.0	Steady
Turnout		1,85,188	56.81	Steady
SP gain from BJP		Swing		

2022 Assembly elections: Hata
Party	Candidate	Votes	%	±%
BJP	Mohan Verma	120,666	55.7	
Right to Recall Party Party	Shailendra Pratap Singh	560	0.26	

=== 2027 ===
2027 Uttar Pradesh Legislative Assembly election: Hata
Party	Candidate	Votes	%	±%
INDIA				
NDA				
BSP				
NOTA	None of the above			
Majority				
Turnout				
gain from		Swing		

=== 2022 ===
2022 Uttar Pradesh Legislative Assembly Election: Hata
Party	Candidate	Votes	%	±%
BJP	Mohan Verma	120,666	55.7	+5.83
SP	Ranvijay Singh	61,301	28.3	+3.91
BSP	Shiwang Singh	21,723	10.03	−10.45
Independent	Rabeesh Singh	5,372	2.48	
INC	Amrendra	2,291	1.06	
NOTA	None of the above	1,214	0.56	−0.38
Majority		59,365	27.4	+1.92
Turnout		216,619	58.0	−1.01
BJP hold		Swing		

=== 2017 ===
2017 Uttar Pradesh Legislative Assembly Election: Hata
Party	Candidate	Votes	%	±%
BJP	Pawan Kumar	103,864	49.87	
SP	Radheshyam Singh	50,788	24.39	
BSP	Virendra	42,651	20.48	
NISHAD	Ajay Rav	2,366	1.14	
NOTA	None of the above	1,933	0.94	
Majority		53,076	25.48	
Turnout		208,257	59.01	
