= Mohammed Ziauddin Rizvi =

Indian politician (born 1959)

Member of the Uttar Pradesh Legislative Assembly
- Incumbent
- Assumed office 10 March 2022
- Preceded by: Sanjay Yadav
- Constituency: Sikanderpur
- In office 2012–2017
- Preceded by: Shri Bhagwan
- Succeeded by: Sanjay Yadav
- Constituency: Sikanderpur
- In office 2002–2007
- Preceded by: Rajdhari
- Succeeded by: Shri Bhagwan
- Constituency: Sikanderpur

Minister of Panchayati Raj
- In office June 2016 – March 2017

Personal details
- Born: 1 January 1959 (age 67) Siwankala, Uttar Pradesh, India
- Party: Samajwadi Party
- Education: Gorakhpur University

Mohammed Ziauddin Rizvi is an Indian politician. He is the Member of the Uttar Pradesh Legislative Assembly from Sikanderpur Assembly constituency. He had served as the Minister of Panchayati Raj in Samajwadi Party Government of Uttar Pradesh headed by Akhilesh Yadav. He got elected for the third term in 2022 Uttar Pradesh Legislative Assembly election succeeding Sanjay Yadav of Bharatiya Janata Party.

== Early life and education ==
Mohammad Ziauddin Rizvi was born to Mohammad Ainuddin Rizvi and Deeba Rizvi on 1 January 1959 at Siwankala village, Ballia district of Uttar Pradesh.

He is a Graduate in Bachelor of Arts from the Deen Dayal Upadhyaya Gorakhpur University in 1986.

== Personal life ==
Rizvi is married to Ayesha Rizvi and they had three children including Mariyam Rizvi.

== Controversies ==
An audio of Rizvi went viral in which he threatened a youth leader of Samajwadi Party. Rizvi had supported a candidate other than the candidate announced by his Party.

Rizvi said in an election campaign that when Samajwadi Party will be in Government, the people who had flags of Bharatiya Janata Party in their homes will not be given Lohiya Aawas and pension.
