= Vinay Kumar Dwivedi =

Member of the Uttar Pradesh Legislative Assembly

Member of Uttar Pradesh Legislative Assembly
- Incumbent
- Assumed office March 2017
- Constituency: Mehnaun

Personal details
- Born: 15 October 1967 (age 58) Gonda, Uttar Pradesh
- Party: Bharatiya Janata Party
- Education: Dr. Ram Manohar Lohia Avadh University
- Profession: Politician

Vinay Kumar Dwivedi is an Indian politician and a member of the 18th Uttar Pradesh Assembly from the Mehnaun Assembly constituency of Gonda district. He is a member of the Bharatiya Janata Party.

== Early life ==
Vinay Kumar Dwivedi was born on 15 October 1971 in Gonda, Uttar Pradesh, to a Hindu family of Ambika Prasad Dwivedi. He married Poonam Dwivedi in 1995, and they had four children.

== Education ==
Vinay Kumar Dwivedi completed his post-graduation at Dr. Ram Manohar Lohia Avadh University, Faizabad.

== Posts held ==
#	From	To	Position	Ref
01	March 2017	March 2022	Member, 17th Uttar Pradesh Assembly	
02	March 2022	Incumbent	Member, 18th Uttar Pradesh Assembly	

== See also ==
- 18th Uttar Pradesh Assembly
- Mehnaun Assembly constituency
- Uttar Pradesh Legislative Assembly
