= Athai Ram Yadav =

Indian politician (born 1926)

Member of the Uttar Pradesh Legislative Assembly
- In office 1974–1980
- Preceded by: Rajit Ram
- Succeeded by: Ranendra Tripathi
- Constituency: Handia

Member of the Uttar Pradesh Legislative Assembly
- In office 1967–1969
- Succeeded by: Rajit Ram
- Constituency: Handia

Personal details
- Born: 1 January 1926 Jagdishpur, Allahabad, United Province
- Party: Bharatiya Kranti Dal; Janata Party
- Spouse: Ramraji Devi
- Children: 4 boys 5 girl 1.Prem Prakash                         2.Jai Prakash                         3.Om Prakash : 4. Satya Prakash
- Parent: Shivphal Yadav

Athai Ram Yadav (born 1 January 1926) was an Indian politician who was elected as Member of the Uttar Pradesh Legislative Assembly from Handia Assembly constituency for three times. He was elected as an independent candidate in 1967 and in 1974 he represented Bharatiya Kranti Dal. He joined the newly formed Janata Party and was elected for the third time from the same constituency.He was a veteran freedom fighter who took an active part in the Quit Indian independence movement and was imprisoned. He was elected a member of the Zila Parishad, and later the head of Dhanupur block.

== Early life and education ==
Athai Ram Yadav was born on 1 January 1926 in Jagdishpur village of Dhanupur block of handiya Prayagraj.

He studied till middle school.

== Personal life ==
Athai Ram Yadav was married to Ramraji Devi.He have four boys five girls and 7 grandsons Sunil, Abhishek, Manoj Yadav, Aniket Yadav, Anurag etc.
