= Ramesh Chandra Mishra =

Indian politician

MLA, 17th Legislative Assembly
- Incumbent
- Assumed office March 2017
- Preceded by: Om Prakash 'Baba' Dubey
- Constituency: Badlapur, Uttar Pradesh

Personal details
- Born: 10 July 1980 (age 46) Jaunpur, Uttar Pradesh
- Party: Bharatiya Janata Party
- Education: High School
- Occupation: MLA
- Profession: Politician

Ramesh Chandra Mishra is an Indian politician and a member of 17th Legislative Assembly of Uttar Pradesh of India. He represents the Badlapur constituency in Jaunpur district of Uttar Pradesh.

== Early life and education ==
Mishra was born 10 July 1980 in Jaunpur, Uttar Pradesh to his father Shri Durga Prasad Mishra. In 1999 he married Sanju Mishra, they have two sons. He earned High School degree in 1995 from UP Board Allahabad.

== Political career ==
Ramesh Chandra Mishra contested Uttar Pradesh Assembly Election as Bhartiya Janata Party candidate and defeated his close contestant Lalji Yadav from Bahujan Samaj Party by a margin of 2,372 votes.

== Posts held ==
#	From	To	Position	Comments
01	March 2017	Incumbent	Member, 17th Legislative Assembly	

== See also ==
- Uttar Pradesh Legislative Assembly
