= Suchismita Maurya =

Indian politician

Member of the Uttar Pradesh Legislative Assembly
- Incumbent
- Assumed office 23 November 2024
- Constituency: Majhawan
- In office 2017–2022
- Constituency: Majhawan

Personal details
- Party: Bharatiya Janata Party
- Education: Awadhesh Pratap Singh University
- Occupation: MLA
- Profession: Politician

Suchismita Maurya is an Indian politician and a member of 17th Legislative Assembly of Majhawan, Uttar Pradesh of India. She represents the Majhawan constituency of Uttar Pradesh. She is a member of the Bharatiya Janata Party. In 2024 By-election in Majhawan Assembly constituency, she retained the seat to become a member of Uttar Pradesh Legislative Assembly for second term.

== Political career ==
Maurya has been a member of the 17th Legislative Assembly of Uttar Pradesh. Since 2017, she has represented the Majhawan Assembly constituency, and is a member of the BJP.

Maurya comes from a political family of Ram Chandra Maurya, who served as the member of Uttar Pradesh Legislative Assembly from Majhawan Assembly constituency and was a member of Bharatiya Janata Party. She is the daughter-in-law of Ram Chandra Maurya. She became active in politics after the death of her father-in-law and was successful in getting the ticket from BJP for the assembly polls of 2017. She registered her first victory and became the member of legislative assembly in the 2017 elections. In 2022, the Majhawan seat was won by Vinod Kumar Bind and later in 2024, Bind was elected to Lok Sabha, the lower house of Indian Parliament, which vacated the seat calling for a by-election.

In 2024 by-elections, BJP once again fielded Maurya as their candidate from the Majhawan Assembly constituency. In this election, she defeated the runner up Jyoti Bind of Samajwadi Party with a margin of 4,922 votes and emerged victorious.

== Personal life ==
She has completed her Master of Science (M.Sc) degree from Riwa, Madhya Pradesh and pursued M.B.A. from Lucknow. As per her affidavit filed before Election Commission of India, she owns immovable property at various places in Uttar Pradesh and Delhi.

== Posts held ==
#	From	To	Position	Comments
01	2017	2022	Member, 17th Legislative Assembly	

== See also ==
- Uttar Pradesh Legislative Assembly
