= Mohan Verma =

Indian politician (born 1975)

Member of Uttar Pradesh Legislative Assembly
- Incumbent
- Assumed office March 2022
- Preceded by: Pawan Kedia
- Constituency: Hata

Personal details
- Born: 15 February 1975 (age 51) Kushinagar, Uttar Pradesh
- Party: Bharatiya Janata Party
- Parent: Ram Nayan Verma (father)
- Profession: Politician

Mohan Verma is an Indian politician and a member of the 18th Uttar Pradesh Assembly from the Hata Assembly constituency of the Kushinagar district. He is a member of the Bharatiya Janata Party.

== Early life ==
Mohan Verma was born on 15 February 1975 in Kushinagar, Uttar Pradesh, to a Hindu family of Ram Nayan Verma. He married Saroj Verma on 12 December 1997, and they have three children.

== See also ==
- Hata Assembly constituency
- 18th Uttar Pradesh Assembly
- Uttar Pradesh Legislative Assembly
