= Prashant Singh =

Indian politician

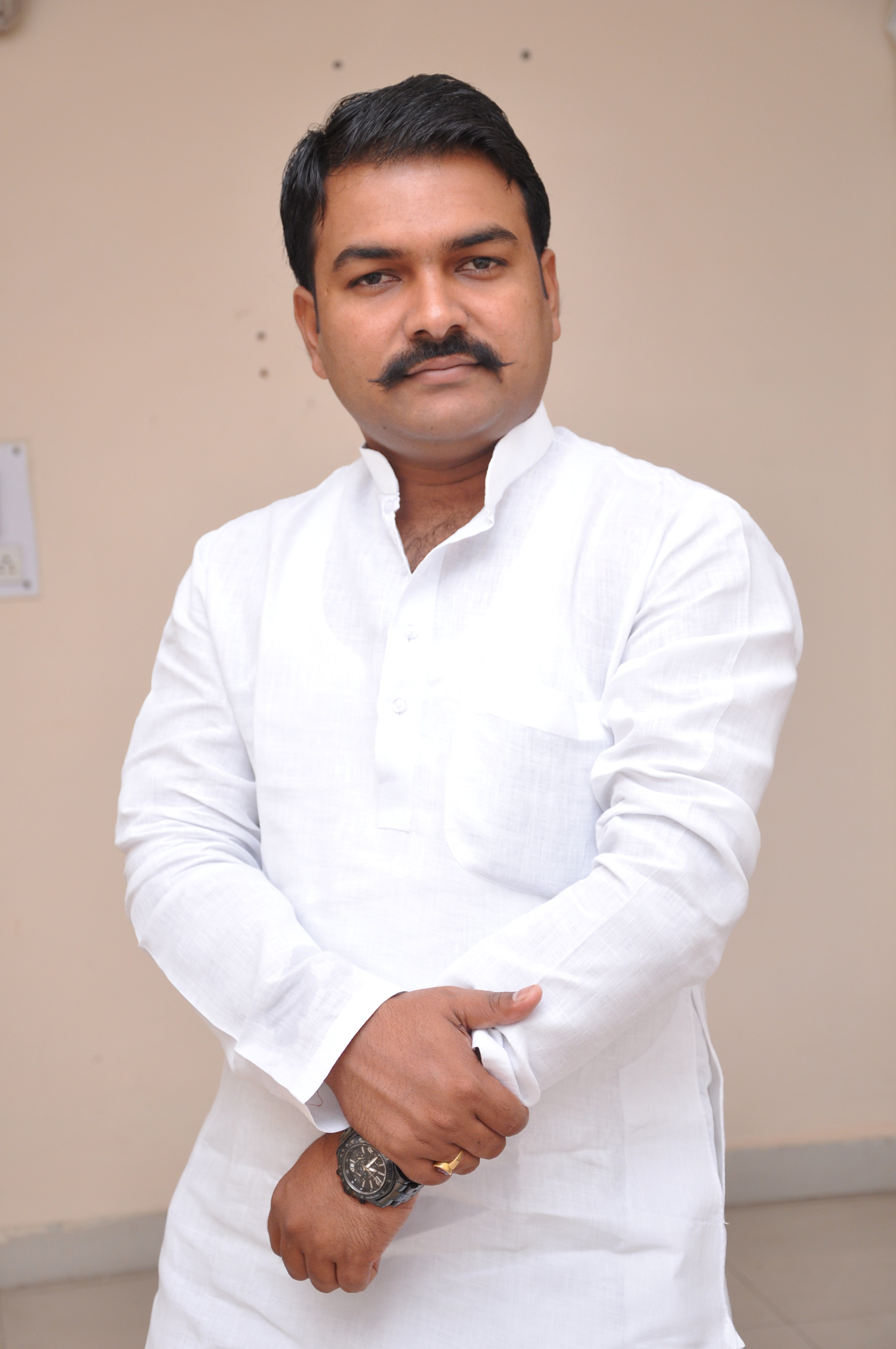

Member of the Uttar Pradesh Legislative Assembly
- In office 2013–2017
- Preceded by: Maheshnarayan Singh
- Succeeded by: Hakim Lal Bind
- Constituency: Handia

Personal details
- Born: 26 October 1986 (age 39) Handiya, Allahabad
- Profession: Politician

Prashant Singh (born 26 October 1986) is an Indian politician. As of 2017, he is a member of Samajwadi Party. He represented the Handia Constituency in Allahabad as a member of the Uttar Pradesh Legislative Assembly Allahabad. When first elected, he was the youngest MLA in India. However, a case was filed in his name about submitting fake age proofs.

== Early life ==
According to his political Advisor Ankaj Tiwari, Singh received his primary education in Dehradoon. He has an LL.M. degree from Dehradoon Law College. While he was in school, his father Mahesh Narayan, who was also an MLA of Handia, died of a chronic disease. After his father's death, Singh contested the Legislative Assembly election from Handia and won.
