= Viveka Nand Pandey =

Indian politician

Vivekanand Pandey

Member of 18th Uttar Pradesh Assembly
- Incumbent
- Assumed office March 2022
- Constituency: Khadda

Personal details
- Party: NISHAD Party
- Occupation: Politician

Vivekanand Pandey is an Indian politician of the Nishad Party. He is a member of the 18th Uttar Pradesh Assembly, representing the Khadda Assembly constituency.
