= Majhawan Assembly constituency =

Constituency of the Uttar Pradesh legislative assembly in India

Coordinates: 26.31°N 80.32°E

Majhawan
- Constituency No. 397 for the Uttar Pradesh Legislative Assembly

Constituency details
- Country: India
- Region: North India
- State: Uttar Pradesh
- District: Mirzapur
- Total electors: 3,97,877
- Reservation: None

Member of Legislative Assembly
- 18th Uttar Pradesh Legislative Assembly
- Incumbent Suchismita Maurya
- Party: BJP
- Elected year: 2024
- Preceded by: Vinod Kumar Bind

Majhawan Assembly constituency is a constituency of the Uttar Pradesh Legislative Assembly covering the town of Majhawan in the Mirzapur district (25 km from Varanasi) of Uttar Pradesh, India.

Majhawan is one of five assembly constituencies in the Mirzapur Lok Sabha constituency. Since 2008, this assembly constituency is numbered 397 amongst 403 constituencies.

== Members of Legislative Assembly ==
Year	Member	Party
1967	Bechan Ram	Indian National Congress
1969	Ram Nihore Ram	Bharatiya Jana Sangh
1974	Rudra Prasad	Indian National Congress
1977	Shivdas Tripathi	Janata Party
1980	Lokpati Tripathi	Indian National Congress (Indira)
1985	Lokpati Tripathi	Indian National Congress
1989	Rudra Prasad	Janata Dal
1991	Bhagwat Pal	Bahujan Samaj Party
1993	Bhagwat Pal	Bahujan Samaj Party
1996	Ram Chandra Maurya	Bharatiya Janata Party
2002	Ramesh Chand Bind	Bahujan Samaj Party
2007	Ramesh Chand Bind	Bahujan Samaj Party
2012	Ramesh Chand Bind	Bahujan Samaj Party
2017	Suchismita Maurya	Bharatiya Janata Party
2022	Vinod Kumar Bind	NISHAD Party
2024^	Suchismita Maurya	Bharatiya Janata Party

^ denotes by-election

== Election results ==
=== 2027 ===
2027 Uttar Pradesh Legislative Assembly election: Majhawan
Party	Candidate	Votes	%	±%
INDIA				
NDA				
BSP				
NOTA	None of the above			
Majority				
Turnout				
gain from		Swing		

=== 2024 bypoll ===
Uttar Pradesh Legislative Assembly by-election, 2024: Majhawan
Party	Candidate	Votes	%	±%
BJP	Suchismita Maurya	77,737	38.55	New
SP	Jyoti Bind	72,815	36.11	▲7.73
BSP	Deepak Tiwari	34,927	17.32	▼4.27
ASP(KR)	Shambhu Nath	3,529	1.75	New
Independent	Ram Lakhan	2,654	1.32	New
NOTA	None of the Above	2,035	1.01	▼0.11
Majority		4,922	2.44	▼11.25
Turnout		2,01,649	50.39	
BJP gain from NISHAD		Swing		

=== 2022 ===
2022 Uttar Pradesh Legislative Assembly election: Majhawan
Party	Candidate	Votes	%	±%
NISHAD	Vinod Kumar Bind	103,235	42.07	▲40.04
SP	Rohit Shukla	69,648	28.38	▲9.97
BSP	Pusplata Bind	52,990	21.59	▼6.17
INC	Shiv Shanker Chaudhary	3,399	1.39	
AAP	Prakash Chand Tripathi	2,361	0.96	
NOTA	None of the above	2,746	1.12	▲0.43
Majority		33,587	13.69	▼3.45
Turnout		245,391	61.68	▼2.07
NISHAD gain from BJP		Swing		

=== 2017 ===
Bharatiya Janata Party candidate Suchismita Maurya won in 2017 Uttar Pradesh Legislative Elections by defeating Bahujan Samaj Party candidate Ramesh Chand Bind by a margin of 41,159 votes.

2017 Uttar Pradesh Legislative Assembly Election: Majhawa
Party	Candidate	Votes	%	±%
BJP	Suchismita Maurya	107,839	44.9	
BSP	Ramesh Chand Bind	66,680	27.76	
SP	Rohit Shukla	44,212	18.41	
NISHAD	Tulsidas	4,867	2.03	
Independent	Kanhaiya Lal	3,667	1.53	
NOTA	None of the above	1,655	0.69	
Majority		41,159	17.14	
Turnout		240,169	63.75	
