= Hakim Lal Bind =

Indian politician (born 1977)

Member of Uttar Pradesh Legislative Assembly
- Incumbent
- Assumed office 2022
- Preceded by: Himself
- Constituency: Handia

Member of Uttar Pradesh Legislative Assembly
- In office 2017–2022
- Preceded by: Prashant Singh
- Succeeded by: Himself
- Constituency: Handia

Personal details
- Born: 21 March 1977 (age 49) Handia, Allahabad, Uttar Pradesh
- Party: Samajwadi Party
- Spouse: Asha Bind
- Children: 2 boys 1 girl

Hakim Lal Bind is a Samajwadi Party leader who is an MLA from Handia Assembly constituency of Prayagraj district, in Uttar Pradesh. Bind was first elected as a BSP candidate in the 2017 Uttar Pradesh Legislative Assembly election. He joined the Samajwadi Party in October 2021 due to differences with Mayawati and was on the Samajwadi Party ticket in the 2022 Uttar Pradesh Assembly elections. He was elected MLA for the second consecutive time, defeating the BJP alliance candidate, Prashant Singh.
