= Khadda Assembly constituency =

Constituency of the Uttar Pradesh legislative assembly in India

Coordinates: 26.93°N 83.95°E

Khadda
- Constituency No. 329 for the Uttar Pradesh Legislative Assembly

Constituency details
- Country: India
- Region: North India
- State: Uttar Pradesh
- District: Kushinagar
- Total electors: 3,40,053
- Reservation: None

Member of Legislative Assembly
- 18th Uttar Pradesh Legislative Assembly
- Incumbent Viveka Nand Pandey
- Party: NISHAD
- Alliance: NDA
- Elected year: 2022

Khadda is a constituency of the Uttar Pradesh Legislative Assembly covering the city of Khadda in the Kushinagar district of Uttar Pradesh, India.

Khadda is one of five assembly constituencies in the Kushi Nagar Lok Sabha constituency. Since 2008, this assembly constituency is numbered 329 amongst 403 constituencies.

== Members of Legislative Assembly ==
Year	Member	Party
Till 2012 : Constituency did not exist
2012	Vijay Kumar Dubey	Indian National Congress
2017	Jatashankar Tripathi	Bharatiya Janata Party
2022	Viveka Nand Pandey	NISHAD Party

== Election results ==
=== 2027 ===
2027 Uttar Pradesh Legislative Assembly election: Khadda
Party	Candidate	Votes	%	±%
INDIA				
NDA				
AIMIM				
BSP				
Majority				
Turnout				
gain from		Swing		

=== 2022 ===
2022 Uttar Pradesh Legislative Assembly election: Khadda
Party	Candidate	Votes	%	±%
NISHAD	Viveka Nand Pandey	88,291	43.08	
Independent	Vijay Pratap Kushwaha	46,840	22.85	
SBSP	Ashok Chauhan	21,126	10.31	
BSP	Nisar Ahmad Siddique	19,997	9.76	▼12.79
AIMIM	Akhtar Wasim (Munna Ansari)	16,419	8.01	▲3.45
INC	Dhananjay	2,272	1.11	
NOTA	None of the above	2,973	1.45	▲0.34
Majority		41,451	20.23	▲0.52
Turnout		204,959	60.27	▼2.39
NISHAD gain from BJP		Swing		

=== 2017 ===
2017 Uttar Pradesh Legislative Assembly Election: Khadd
Party	Candidate	Votes	%	±%
BJP	Jatashanker Tripathi	82,537	42.26	
BSP	Vijay Pratap Kushwaha	44,040	22.55	
SP	Vijendra Pal Yadav	34,982	17.91	
AIMIM	Nisar Ahmad	8,903	4.56	
PECP	Kishor Kumar	7,126	3.65	
SS	Ajay Govind Rao	4,721	2.42	
Independent	Rajkumar Tulsyan	2,120	1.09	
RLD	Dhananjay	1,934	0.99	
NOTA	None of the above	2,140	1.11	
Majority		38,497	19.71	
Turnout		195,328	62.66	

=== 1980 ===
- Mahesh Prasad (INC(I)) : 22,114
- Nathuni (JNP-SC) : 10,180

=== 1977 ===
- Shri Narain urf Bhulai Bhai (Janata Party) : 30,956
- Baijnath Prasad (Congress) : 22,279

=== 1974 ===
Bhulai Bhai - of Jana Sangh, Janata Party, and BJP over years - represented Khadda area (then known as Naurangia seat) in 1974 and 1977.

- The seat was named Naurangiya in 1974.
- Shri Narain urf Bhulai Bhai (Jana Sangh) : 21,422
- Baijnath Prasad (Congress) : 19,508
