= Bhatpar Rani Assembly constituency =

Constituency of the Uttar Pradesh legislative assembly in India

Coordinates: 26.31°N 84.03°E

Bhatpar Rani
- Constituency No. 340 for the Uttar Pradesh Legislative Assembly

Constituency details
- Country: India
- Region: North India
- State: Uttar Pradesh
- District: Deoria
- Total electors: 3,38,287
- Reservation: None

Member of Legislative Assembly
- 18th Uttar Pradesh Legislative Assembly
- Incumbent Sabhakunwar Kushawaha
- Party: Bhartiya Janta Party
- Elected year: 2022

Bhatpar Rani is a constituency of the Uttar Pradesh Legislative Assembly covering the city of Bhatpar Rani in the Deoria district of Uttar Pradesh, India.

Bhatpar Rani is one of five assembly constituencies in the Lok Sabha constituency of Salempur. Since 2008, this assembly constituency is numbered 340 amongst 403 constituencies.

== Members of Legislative Assembly ==
Year	Member	Party
1967	Ayodhya Prasad Arya	Indian National Congress
1969	Harivansh Sahay	Samyukta Socialist Party
1974	Raghuraj Singh	Indian National Congress
1977	Raj Mangal	Janata Party
1980	Harivansh Sahay	Janata Party (Secular)
1985	Kameshwar Upadhyay	Independent
1989	Harivansh Sahay	Janata Dal
1991	Harivansh Sahay	Janata Dal
1993	Kameshwar Upadhyay	Indian National Congress
1996	Yogendra Singh	Samajwadi Party
2002	Kameshwar Upadhyay	Indian National Congress
2007	Kameshwar Upadhyay	Samajwadi Party
2012	Kameshwar Upadhyay	Samajwadi Party
2013^	Ashutosh Upadhyay	Samajwadi Party
2017	Ashutosh Upadhyay	Samajwadi Party
2022	Sabhakunwar Kushawaha	Bharatiya Janata Party

== Election results ==
=== 2027 ===
2027 Uttar Pradesh Legislative Assembly election: Bhatpur
Party	Candidate	Votes	%	±%
INDIA				
NDA				
BSP				
NOTA	None of the above			
Majority				
Turnout				
gain from		Swing		

=== 2022 ===
Sabhakunwar Kushwaha from Party BJP won the seat of legislative Assembly by defeating Ashutosh Upadhyay.

2022 Uttar Pradesh Legislative Assembly Election: Bhatpar Ran
Party	Candidate	Votes	%	±%
BJP	Sabhakunwar	91,282	46.98	+19.0
SP	Ashutosh Upadhyay	73,200	37.68	+3.59
BSP	Ajay	18,576	9.56	−14.78
INC	Keshav Chand Yadav	4,486	2.31	
Jan Adhikar Party	Ajimullah	2,154	1.11	
NOTA	None of the above	1,589	0.82	−0.32
Majority		18,082	9.3	+3.19
Turnout		194,282	57.43	−0.05
BJP gain from SP		Swing		

=== 2017 ===
Samajwadi Party candidate Ashutosh Upadhyay won in last Assembly election of 2017 Uttar Pradesh Legislative Elections defeating Bharatiya Janta Party candidate Jayanth Kushwaha by a margin of 11,097 votes.

2017 Uttar Pradesh Legislative Assembly Election: Bhatpar Ran
Party	Candidate	Votes	%	±%
SP	Ashutosh	61,862	34.09	
BJP	Jaynath Kushwaha Urf Guddan	50,765	27.98	
BSP	Sabhakunwar	44,161	24.34	
Independent	Ashwani Kumar Singh	13,497	7.44	
NOTA	None of the above	2,039	1.14	
Majority		11,097	6.11	
Turnout		181,465	57.48	

aliraj
