= Dinanath Bhaskar =

Indian politician (born 1963)

Minister of Uttar Pradesh MLA, 12th Legislative Assembly
- In office 1993–1995
- Minister: Health Minister
- Constituency: Chandauli

Chairman of the National Commission for Scheduled Tribes
- In office 2004 – 2007

MLA, 14th Legislative Assembly
- In office 2002–2007
- Constituency: Bhadohi

Minister of State
- In office 2002–2004
- Constituency: Aurai

MLA, 17th Legislative Assembly
- Incumbent
- Assumed office 2017

Personal details
- Born: 10 March 1963 (age 63) Chandauli, Uttar Pradesh, India
- Party: Bharatiya Janta Party (2015–present)
- Other political affiliations: Bahujan Samaj Party (2009–2015); Samajwadi Party (1996–2009)
- Profession: Politician

Dinanath Bhaskar (born 10 March 1963) is an Indian politician active in the state of Uttar Pradesh. Once a close associate of Kanshi Ram, he was a founding member of the Bahujan Samaj Party (BSP) and was Minister for Health during the state's coalition government of the Samajwadi Party (SP) and BSP in 1993. He quit the BSP to join the SP in 1996, rejoined the BSP around 2009 and in 2015 joined the Bharatiya Janata Party (BJP).

In the 2017 state elections, Bhaskar was elected as Member of the Legislative Assembly (MLA) for Aurai constituency as a BJP candidate. This was his third successful election to the Uttar Pradesh Legislative Assembly.

In the 2022 state election, Bhaskar repeated as MLA for the fourth time in the Legislative Assembly.

He is currently working on the Public Accounts Committee UP Legislative Assembly.

== Career ==
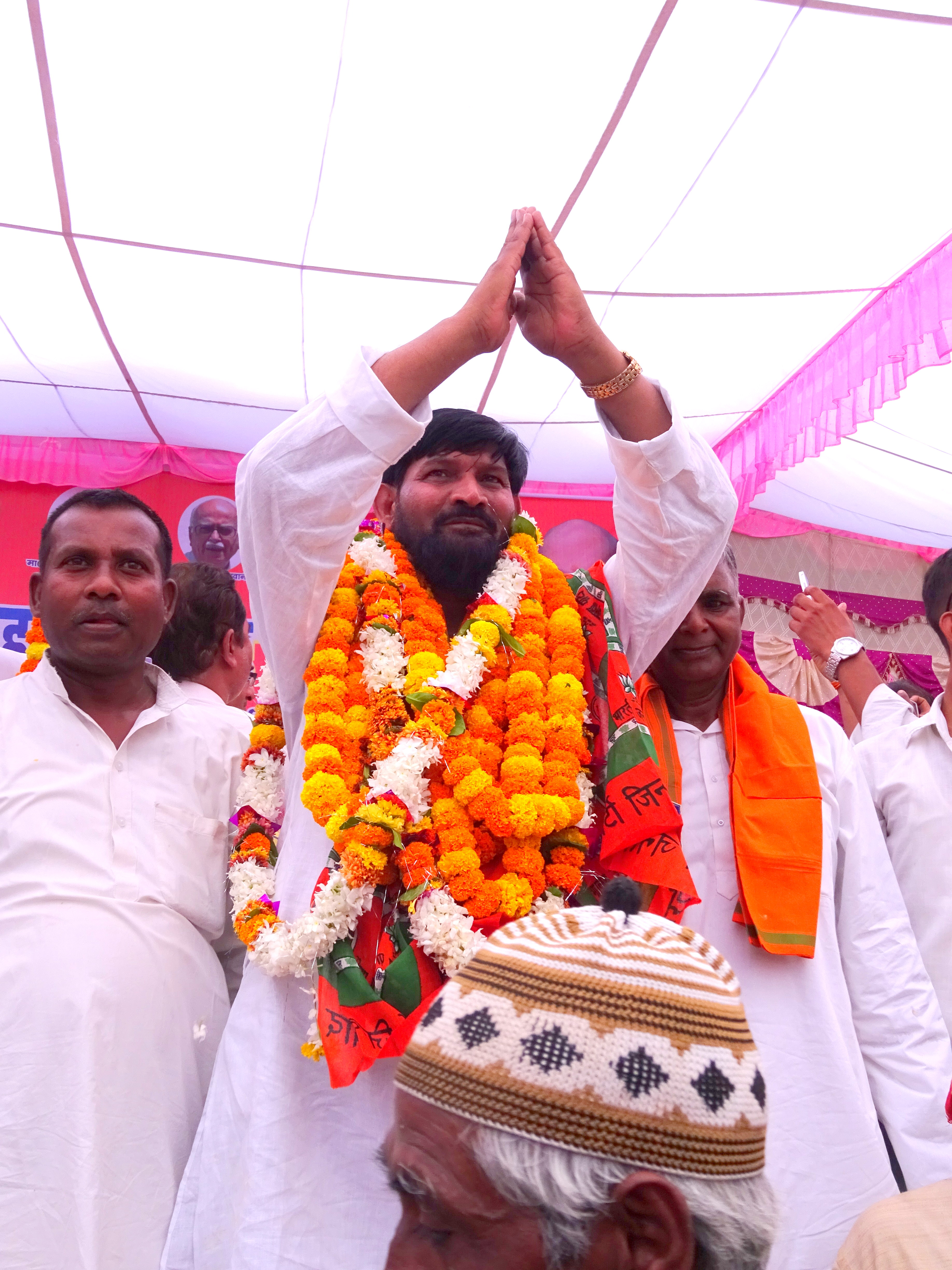
In Jan Sabha

Once a close associate of Kanshi Ram, Dinanath Bhaskar was elected to the Legislative Assembly of Uttar Pradesh from the Chandauli constituency in 1993 on a BSP ticket. Around that time he was noted as a controversial character in the caste-ridden politics of Uttar Pradesh, much disliked by upper castes for his alignment with Dalits and other minorities and his exhortations to them to become militant.

Bhaskar left the BSP after Mayawati accused Mulayam Singh Yadav of trying to induce support from Bhaskar. Standing as an SP candidate in the 1996 assembly elections, he lost the contest in the Bhadohi constituency to Purnmasi Pankaj of the BJP. (Note: The 12th Assembly of Uttar Pradesh was dissolved in October 1995 but the 13th Assembly did not convene until October 1996) He then successfully contested the 2002 elections in the same constituency to become a Member of the Legislative Assembly for a second time. He lost the seat to the BSP candidate, Archana Saroj, in 2007 and left the party after being denied a Vidhan Sabha ticket in a 2009 by-election. He then re-joined the BSP and was made Coordinator of Allahabad zone, Mirzapur zone and Varanasi Zone respectively.

Bhaskar resigned from the BSP on 4 April 2015, accusing it of selling its election candidacies, and joined the BJP one month later. He won the Aurai constituency in the 2017 Uttar Pradesh Legislative Assembly elections as a BJP candidate.

== Offices held ==
- 1993 to 1995: Member of Legislative Assembly Chandauli
- 2002 to 2007: Member of Legislative Assembly Bhadohi
- 1993: Health, Health Education, Family welfare and Village Development Minister (Uttar Pradesh)
- 2003 to 2004: Minister of State
- 2004 to 2007: Chairman Scheduled Castes and Scheduled Tribe (SC/ST) Commission, Uttar Pradesh
- 2002 to 2007: Member, Joint Standing Committee Scheduled Castes, Scheduled Tribe and extinct Castes (Uttar Pradesh Legislative Assembly)
- March 2017 – 2022: BJP MLA for Aurai
- 2017 to Present: Member, Joint Standing Committee Scheduled Castes, Scheduled Tribe and extinct Castes (Uttar Pradesh Legislative Assembly)
- 2018–Present: Member State working Committee BJP Uttar Pradesh
- 2022–Present : 4th Time MLA Aurai Bhadohi
- 2022–Present : Member of Public Accounts Committee, UP Legislative Assembly
- 2025–Present : Chairman of The Joint Committee On SC, ST and Denotified Tribes, UP Legislative Assembly
