= Ravindra Nath Tripathi =

Indian politician

MLA, 17th Legislative Assembly
- Incumbent
- Assumed office 2017
- Constituency: Bhadohi, Bhadohi

Personal details
- Born: Suriyawan
- Party: Bharatiya Janata Party
- Occupation: MLA
- Profession: Politician

Ravindra Nath Tripathi is an Indian politician and a member of 17th Legislative Assembly, Uttar Pradesh of India. He represents the Bhadohi constituency of Uttar Pradesh. He is a member of the Bharatiya Janata Party.

== Political career ==
Ravindra Nath Tripathi has been a member of the 17th Legislative Assembly of Uttar Pradesh. Since 2017, he has represented the Bhadohi constituency and is a member of the BJP. Ravindra Nath Tripathi won the Uttar Pradesh assembly elections held in 2017 by defeating his close contestant Zahid Baig with a margin of 1,105 votes.

#	From	To	Position	Comments
01	2017	2022	Member, 17th Legislative Assembly	
