= Mehnaun Assembly constituency =

Constituency of the Uttar Pradesh legislative assembly in India

Coordinates: 27.28°N 82.16°E

Mehnaun
- Constituency No. 295 for the Uttar Pradesh Legislative Assembly

Constituency details
- Country: India
- Region: North India
- State: Uttar Pradesh
- District: Gonda
- Total electors: 3,66,079
- Reservation: None

Member of Legislative Assembly
- 18th Uttar Pradesh Legislative Assembly
- Incumbent Vinay Kumar Dwivedi
- Party: Bharatiya Janata Party
- Elected year: 2017

Mehnaun is a constituency of the Uttar Pradesh Legislative Assembly. It comprises the city of Khargupur and some other parts of Gonda tehsil, in Gonda district and is one of five assembly constituencies in the Gonda Lok Sabha constituency. As of 2022, it is represented by Vinay Kumar Dwivedi of the Bharatiya Janata Party.

== Members of the Legislative Assembly ==
Election	Name	Party
2012	Nandita Shukla	Samajwadi Party
2017	Vinay Kumar Dwivedi	Bharatiya Janata Party
2022	Vinay Kumar Dwivedi	Bharatiya Janata Party

== Election results ==
=== 2027 ===
2027 Uttar Pradesh Legislative Assembly election: Mehnnaun
Party	Candidate	Votes	%	±%
INDIA				
NDA				
BSP				
NOTA	None of the above			
Majority				
Turnout				
gain from		Swing		

=== 2022 ===
2022 Uttar Pradesh Legislative Assembly election: Mehnaun
Party	Candidate	Votes	%	±%
BJP	Vinay Kumar Dwivedi	107,327	50.05	+9.32
SP	Nandita Shukla	84,109	39.22	+18.67
BSP	Shiv Kumar	10,883	5.08	−18.08
INC	Qutubuddin Khan Diamond	5,499	2.56	
NOTA	None of the above	1,971	0.92	−0.07
Majority		23,218	10.83	−6.74
Turnout		214,439	58.58	+0.45
BJP hold		Swing		

=== 2017 ===
Bharatiya Janta Party candidate Vinay Kumar Dwivedi won the 2017 Uttar Pradesh Legislative Assembly election, defeating Bahujan Samaj Party candidate Arshad Ali Khan by a margin of 36,378 votes.

2022 Uttar Pradesh Legislative Assembly election: Mehnaun
Party	Candidate	Votes	%	±%
BJP	Vinay Kumar Dwivedi	84,304	40.73	
BSP	Arshad Ali Khan	47,926	23.16	
SP	Rahul Shukla	42,526	20.55	
Independent	Pratibha Singh	17,619	8.51	
Bharatiya Subhash Sena	Madhuri Tiwari	2,041	0.99	
Independent	Hanoman Prasad	1,944	0.94	
NOTA	None of the above	2,019	0.99	
Majority		36,378	17.57	
Turnout		206,971	58.13	
BJP gain from SP		Swing		
