= Ashutosh Upadhyay =

Indian politician

Member of Legislative Assembly of Bhatpar Rani
- In office March 2017 – March 2022
- In office March 2013 – March 2017 (By Poll)
- Preceded by: Late sri Kameshwar Upadhyay (Ex Cabinet Minister)
- Constituency: Bhatpar Rani, Deoria

Personal details
- Born: 30 December 1981 (age 44) Belpar Pandit, Deoria, Uttar Pradesh
- Party: Samajwadi Party
- Spouse: Nisha Upadhyay (m. 2008)
- Children: 1 son, 1 daughter
- Parent: Kameshwar Upadhyay
- Education: M.A. and B.Ed.
- Occupation: MLA
- Profession: Politician

Ashutosh Upadhyay is an Indian politician and a member of 16th and 17th Legislative Assembly of Uttar Pradesh of Deoria, Uttar Pradesh of India. He represents the Bhatpar Rani constituency of Uttar Pradesh and is a member of the Samajwadi Party. He is son of veteran leader, ex cabinet minister late shri Kameshwar Upadhyay who was 5 times MLA and 3 times minister from U.P.

== Early life and education ==
Upadhyay was born (30 December 1981) in Belpar Pandit, Deoria, Uttar Pradesh to his father Kameshwar Upadhyay (five time MLA of Bhatpar Rani). He married Nisha Upadhyay in 2008, they have one son and one daughter. He belongs to Brahmin family. He had M.A. and B.Ed. degree from Deen Dayal Upadhyay Gorakhpur University. He has two brothers 1. Dr. Pankaj Upadhyay Dy. CMS 2. Abhishek Upadhyay Software Engineer Businessman.

== Political career ==
Upadhyay has been MLA for two terms. Since 2013, he represents Bhatpar Rani constituency as a member of Samajwadi Party. In 2013 (By Poll), elections he defeated his nearest rival Sabhakunwar candidate of Suheldev Bharatiya Samaj Party by a margin of 34,102 votes.

In second term 17th Legislative Assembly of Uttar Pradesh (2017), elections, he again defeated Bhartiya Janata Party candidate Jaynath Kushwaha Urf Guddan by a margin of 11,097 votes.

== Posts held ==
#	From	To	Position	Comments
01	March 2013	March 2017	Member, 16th Legislative Assembly of Uttar Pradesh	By Poll
02	March 2017	March 2022	Member, 17th Legislative Assembly of Uttar Pradesh	
