= Sanjay Yadav (Uttar Pradesh politician) =

Indian politician (born 1979)

MLA, 17th Legislative Assembly of Uttar Pradesh
- In office March 2017 – March 2022
- Preceded by: Mohammed Ziauddin Rizvi
- Succeeded by: Mohammed Ziauddin Rizvi
- Constituency: Sikanderpur, Ballia

Personal details
- Born: 5 September 1979 (age 47) Kasili, Deoria, Uttar Pradesh
- Party: Bharatiya Janata Party
- Spouse: Anamika Yadav
- Children: Arnav Yadav
- Parent: Late Harinath Yadav
- Education: Mahatma Gandhi University, Meghalaya
- Occupation: MLA
- Profession: Politician

Sanjay Yadav is an Indian politician and a member of 17th Legislative Assembly of Uttar Pradesh of India. He represents the Sikanderpur constituency of Ballia district Uttar Pradesh and is a member of the Bhartiya Janata Party.

== Early life and education ==
Yadav was born 5 September 1979 in Kasili, Deoria, Uttar Pradesh to his father Harinath Yadav. He married Anamika Yadav, they have one son. He belongs to Ahir Yadav community. He graduated from Mahatma Gandhi University, Meghalaya in 2015.

== Political career ==
Yadav has been MLA for one term. Since 2017, he represents Sikanderpur (Assembly constituency) as a member of Bhartiya Janata Party. He defeated Samajwadi Party candidate Ziauddin Rizwi by a margin of 23,548 votes.

== Posts held ==
#	From	To	Position	Comments
01	March 2017	March 2022	Member, 17th Legislative Assembly of Uttar Pradesh	
