= Badlapur Assembly constituency =

Constituency of the Uttar Pradesh legislative assembly in India

Coordinates: 25.89°N 82.45°E

Badlapur
- Constituency No. 364 for the Uttar Pradesh Legislative Assembly

Constituency details
- Country: India
- Region: North India
- State: Uttar Pradesh
- District: Jaunpur
- Total electors: 3,51,356
- Reservation: None

Member of Legislative Assembly
- 18th Uttar Pradesh Legislative Assembly
- Incumbent Ramesh Chandra Mishra
- Party: Bharatiya Janta Party
- Elected year: 2022
- Preceded by: Om Prakash Dubey

Badlapur is a constituency of the Uttar Pradesh Legislative Assembly covering the city of Badlapur in the Jaunpur district of Uttar Pradesh, India. Badlapur is one of five assembly constituencies in the Jaunpur Lok Sabha constituency. Since 2008, this assembly constituency is numbered 364 amongst 403 constituencies.

== Members of Legislative Assembly ==
Year	Member	Party
Till 2012 : Constituency did not exist
2012	Om Prakash Dubey	Samajwadi Party
2017	Ramesh Chandra Mishra	Bharatiya Janata Party
2022	Ramesh Chandra Mishra	Bharatiya Janata Party

== Election results ==
=== 2027 ===
2027 Uttar Pradesh Legislative Assembly election: Badlapur
Party	Candidate	Votes	%	±%
INDIA				
NDA				
BSP				
NOTA	None of the above			
Majority				
Turnout				
gain from		Swing		

=== 2022 ===
2022 Uttar Pradesh Legislative Assembly election: Badlapur
Party	Candidate	Votes	%	±%
BJP	Ramesh Chandra Mishra	82,391	39.72	▲8.11
SP	Om Prakash Dubey	81,065	39.08	▲14.66
BSP	Manoj	34,792	16.77	▼13.59
NOTA	None of the above	892	0.43	▼0.42
Majority		1,326	0.64	▼0.61
Turnout		207,419	59.03	▼1.88
BJP hold		Swing		

=== 2017 ===
Bharatiya Janta Party candidate Ramesh Chandra Mishra won in 2017 Uttar Pradesh Legislative Elections by defeating Bahujan Samaj Party candidate Lalji Yadav by a margin of 2,372 votes.

2017 Uttar Pradesh Legislative Assembly election: Badlapur
Party	Candidate	Votes	%	±%
BJP	Ramesh Chandra Mishra	60,237	31.61	
BSP	Lalji Yadav	57,865	30.36	
SP	Om Prakash Dubey	46,545	24.42	
NISHAD	Sabhapati	15,565	8.17	
RLD	Mrigendra Singh Alias Shivbaba	3,763	1.97	
NOTA	None of the above	1,612	0.85	
Majority		2,372	1.25	
Turnout		190,590	60.91	

== See also ==
- Garwara Assembly constituency
