= Bhadohi Assembly constituency =

Constituency of the Uttar Pradesh legislative assembly in India

Coordinates: 25.39°N 82.57°E

Bhadohi
- Constituency No. 392 for the Uttar Pradesh Legislative Assembly

Constituency details
- Country: India
- Region: North India
- State: Uttar Pradesh
- District: Bhadohi
- Total electors: 4,29,201
- Reservation: None

Member of Legislative Assembly
- 18th Uttar Pradesh Legislative Assembly
- Incumbent Zahid Baig
- Party: Samajwadi Party
- Elected year: 2022

Bhadohi is a constituency of the Uttar Pradesh Legislative Assembly covering the city of Bhadohi in the Bhadohi district of Uttar Pradesh, India.

Bhadohi is one of five assembly constituencies in the Bhadohi Lok Sabha constituency.

== Members of the Legislative Assembly ==
Year	Member	Party
1962	Banshidhar Pandey	Indian National Congress
1967	H. Ram	Indian National Congress
1969	Ram Nihor	Bharatiya Kranti Dal
1974	Ram Nihor	Bharatiya Kranti Dal
1977	Mithai Lal	Janata Party
1980	Banwari Ram	Indian National Congress (I)
1985	Mool Chand	Lokdal
1989	Mool Chand	Janata Dal
1991	Purnmasi Pankaj	Bharatiya Janata Party
1993	Mewa Lal Bagi	Bahujan Samaj Party
1996	Purnmasi Pankaj	Bharatiya Janata Party
2002	Dinanath Bhaskar	Samajwadi Party
2007	Archana Saroj	Bahujan Samaj Party
2009^	Madhubala	Samajwadi Party
2012	Zahid Baig	Samajwadi Party
2017	Ravindra Nath Tripathi	Bharatiya Janata Party
2022	Zahid Baig	Samajwadi Party

== Election results ==
=== 2027 ===
2027 Uttar Pradesh Legislative Assembly election: Bhadohi
Party	Candidate	Votes	%	±%
INDIA				
NDA				
BSP				
NOTA	None of the above			
Majority				
Turnout				
gain from		Swing		

=== 2022 ===
2022 Uttar Pradesh Legislative Assembly election: Bhadohi
Party	Candidate	Votes	%	±%
SP	Zahid Baig	100,738	40.24	+7.5
BJP	Ravindra Nath Tripathi	95,853	38.29	+5.09
BSP	Harishankar (Dada Chauhan)	40,758	16.28	−7.33
AIMIM	Ravishankar	3,127	1.25	
INC	Wasim Ansari	2,353	0.94	
NOTA	None of the above	2,141	0.86	+0.51
Majority		4,885	1.95	+1.49
Turnout		250,365	58.33	+0.68
SP gain from BJP		Swing		

=== 2017 ===
2017 General Elections: Bhadohi
Party	Candidate	Votes	%	±%
BJP	Ravindra Nath Tripathi	79,519	33.2	
SP	Zahid Beg	78,414	32.74	
BSP	Rangnath Mishra	56,555	23.61	
NISHAD	Dr. R.K. Patel	11,433	4.77	
NOTA	None of the above	830	0.35	
Majority		1,105	0.46	
Turnout		239,518	57.65	
BJP gain from SP		Swing		
