= Aurai, Uttar Pradesh Assembly constituency =

Constituency of the Uttar Pradesh legislative assembly in India

Coordinates: 25.27°N 82.56°E

Aurai
- Constituency No. 394 for the Uttar Pradesh Legislative Assembly

Constituency details
- Country: India
- Region: North India
- State: Uttar Pradesh
- District: Bhadohi
- Reservation: SC

Member of Legislative Assembly
- 18th Uttar Pradesh Legislative Assembly
- Incumbent Dinanath Bhaskar
- Party: Bharatiya Janta Party
- Elected year: 2022

Aurai is a constituency of the Uttar Pradesh Legislative Assembly covering the city of Aurai in the Bhadohi district of Uttar Pradesh, India. It is one of five assembly constituencies in the Bhadohi Lok Sabha constituency. Since 2008, this assembly constituency is reserved for candidates of the Scheduled Castes.

== Members of the Legislative Assembly ==
Year	Member	Party
1967	Nihala Singh	Indian National Congress
1969	Nihala Singh	Indian National Congress
1974	Girija Shankar Pathak	Bharatiya Kranti Dal
1977	Bechuram	Janata Party
1980	Yogesh Chandra	Indian National Congress (I)
1985	Nihala Singh	Janata Party
1989	Nihala Singh	Janata Dal
1991	Yogesh Chandra	Janata Dal
1993	Rangnath Mishra	Bharatiya Janata Party
1996	Rangnath Mishra	Bharatiya Janata Party
2002	Uday Bhan Singh	Bahujan Samaj Party
2005^	Rangnath Mishra	Bahujan Samaj Party
2007	Rangnath Mishra	Bahujan Samaj Party
2012	Madhubala Pasi	Samajwadi Party
2017	Dinanath Bhaskar	Bharatiya Janata Party
2022	Dinanath Bhaskar	Bharatiya Janata Party

== Election results ==
=== 2027 ===
2027 Uttar Pradesh Legislative Assembly election: Aurai
Party	Candidate	Votes	%	±%
INDIA				
NDA				
BSP				
NOTA	None of the above			
Majority				
Turnout				
gain from		Swing		

=== 2022 ===
2022 Uttar Pradesh Legislative Assembly election: Aurai
Party	Candidate	Votes	%	±%
BJP	Dinanath Bhaskar	93,691	41.69	+1.25
SP	Anjani Saroj	92,044	40.95	+10.11
BSP	Kamala Shankar	28,413	12.64	−11.17
INC	Sanjoo Devi	2,694	1.2	
VIP	Babita	2,499	1.11	
AIMIM	Tedhai	2,190	0.97	
NOTA	None of the above	2,205	0.98	−0.24
Majority		1,647	0.74	−8.86
Turnout		224,745	59.5	+0.47
BJP hold		Swing		

=== 2017 ===
Bharatiya Janta Party candidate Dinanath Bhaskar won in 2017 Uttar Pradesh Legislative Elections defeating Samajwadi Party candidate Madhubala Pasi by a margin of 19,979 votes.

2017 Uttar Pradesh Legislative Assembly election: Aurai
Party	Candidate	Votes	%	±%
BJP	Dinanath Bhaskar	83,325	40.44	
SP	Madhubala Pasi	63,546	30.84	
BSP	Baijnath Gautam	49,059	23.81	
NISHAD	Suresh Kumar Pasi	3,508	1.7	
NOTA	None of the above	2,480	1.22	
Majority		19,779	9.6	
Turnout		206,026	59.03	
BJP gain from SP		Swing		
