= Hata, India =

Sub-district in Uttar Pradesh, India

Hata
- Town
- Location in Uttar Pradesh, India Hata (India)
- Coordinates: 26.75°N 83.74°E
- Country: India
- State: Uttar Pradesh
- District: Kushinagar

Area
  - Total: 25 km^{2} (9.7 sq mi)
- Elevation: 75 m (246 ft)

Population (2011)
  - Total: 12,805
  - Density: 510/km^{2} (1,300/sq mi)

Languages
  - Official: Hindi
- Time zone: UTC+5:30 (IST)
- Postal code: 274203
- Vehicle registration: UP 57
- Website: www.kushinagar.nic.in

Hata is a town located at NH-28 having 25 wards and a Nagarpalika in Kushinagar district in the Indian state of Uttar Pradesh. It is situated 36 km away from Gorakhpur in east. It is a major town of Kushinagar district situated on NH -28. Nearest railway station is Gauri Bajar, which is 17 km away from the town and the next major market of Kaptanganj is located 23 km away from it. Hata is the main market for wholesaler, local vendors & retailers.

== Geography ==
Hata is located at 26.75°N 83.74°E. It has an average elevation of 75 metres (246 feet).

== Demographics ==
As of the 2011 Indian census, Hata had a population of 11,259. Males constitute 51.5% of the population and females 48.5%. Hata has an average literacy rate of 62%, higher than the national average of 59.5%; male literacy is 70%, and female literacy is 54%. In Hata, 17% of the population is under 6 years of age.
