= Handia Assembly constituency =

Constituency of the Uttar Pradesh legislative assembly in India

Coordinates: 25.36°N 82.19°E

Handia
- Constituency No. 258 for the Uttar Pradesh Legislative Assembly

Constituency details
- Country: India
- Region: North India
- State: Uttar Pradesh
- District: Prayagraj
- Lok Sabha constituency: Bhadohi
- Total electors: 4,01,042
- Reservation: None

Member of Legislative Assembly
- 18th Uttar Pradesh Legislative Assembly
- Incumbent Hakim Lal Bind
- Party: Samajwadi Party
- Elected year: 2022

Handia is a constituency of the Uttar Pradesh Legislative Assembly covering the city of Handia in the Prayagraj district of Uttar Pradesh, India.

Handia is one of five assembly constituencies in the Bhadohi Lok Sabha constituency. Since 2008, this assembly constituency is numbered 258 amongst 403 constituencies of the Uttar Pradesh Legislative Assembly.

== Members of Legislative Assembly ==
Year	Member	Party
1967	Athai Ram Yadav	Independent politician
1969	Rajit Ram	Indian National Congress
1974	Athai Ram Yadav	Bharatiya Kranti Dal
1977	Athai Ram Yadav	Janata Party
1980	Rajendra Tripathi	Indian National Congress
1985	Rakesh Dhar Tripathi	Janata Party
1989	Rakesh Dhar Tripathi	Janata Dal
1991	Brij Bhan Yadav	Janata Dal
1993	Jokhu Lal Yadav	Bahujan Samaj Party
1996	Rakesh Dhar Tripathi	Bharatiya Janata Party
2002	Mahesh Narayan Singh	Samajwadi Party
2007	Rakesh Dhar Tripathi	Bahujan Samaj Party
2012	Mahesh Narayan Singh	Samajwadi Party
2013 (by-election)	Prashant Singh	Samajwadi Party
2017	Hakim Lal Bind	Bahujan Samaj Party
2022	Hakim Lal Bind	Samajwadi Party

== Election results ==
Vote share of winning candidates
2022	39.36%
2017	35.84%
2012	48.51%
2007	41.49%

=== 2027 ===
2027 Uttar Pradesh Legislative Assembly election: Handia
Party	Candidate	Votes	%	±%
INDIA				
NDA				
BSP				
NOTA	None of the above			
Majority				
Turnout				
gain from		Swing		

=== 2022 ===
2022 Uttar Pradesh Legislative Assembly election: Handia
Party	Candidate	Votes	%	±%
SP	Hakim Lal Bind	84,417	39.36	+11.95
NISHAD	Prashant Kumar Singh	80,874	37.71	
BSP	Narendra Kumar (Munna Tripathi)	33,877	15.8	−20.04
Jan Adhikar Party	Gulab Chandra	4,349	2.03	
Independent	Lal Sahab	1,984	0.93	
NOTA	None of the above	1,960	0.91	−0.3
Majority		3,543	1.65	−2.57
Turnout		214,451	53.47	−1.22
SP gain from BSP		Swing		

=== 2017 ===
Bahujan Samaj Party candidate Hakim Lal Bind won in 2017 Uttar Pradesh Legislative Elections defeating Apna Dal (Sonelal) candidate Pramila Devi by a margin of 8,526 votes.

2017 Uttar Pradesh Legislative Assembly Election: Handi
Party	Candidate	Votes	%	±%
BSP	Hakim Lal Bind	72,446	35.84	
AD(S)	Pramila Tripathi	63,920	31.62	
SP	Nidhi Yadav	55,403	27.41	
Independent	Awadhesh Kumar Tiwari	2,995	1.48	
NOTA	None of the above	2,414	1.21	
Majority		8,526	4.22	
Turnout		202,123	54.69	

=== 2012 ===
2012 Uttar Pradesh Legislative Assembly election: Handia
Party	Candidate	Votes	%	±%
SP	Mahesh Narayan Singh	88,475	48.51	
Pragatisheel Manav Samaj Party	Dr. Rakeshdhar Tripathi	43,096	23.63	
BSP	Rammilan Yadav	31,930	17.51	
INC	Rajendra Tripathi	5,385	2.95	
Majority		45,379	24.88	
Turnout		182,368	57.07	
SP gain from BSP		Swing		

=== 2007 ===
2007 Uttar Pradesh Legislative Assembly election: Handia
Party	Candidate	Votes	%	±%
BSP	Rakesh Dhar Tripathi	62,151	41.49	
SP	Mahesh Narayan Singh	60,809	40.59	
Pragatisheel Manav Samaj Party	Manoj Kumar alias Lala Mishra	8,704	5.81	
BJP	Veni Madhav Bind	3,989	2.66	
Majority		1,342	0.90	
Turnout		149,807		
BSP gain from SP		Swing		
