= Ramesh Chand Bind =

Indian politician (born 1974)

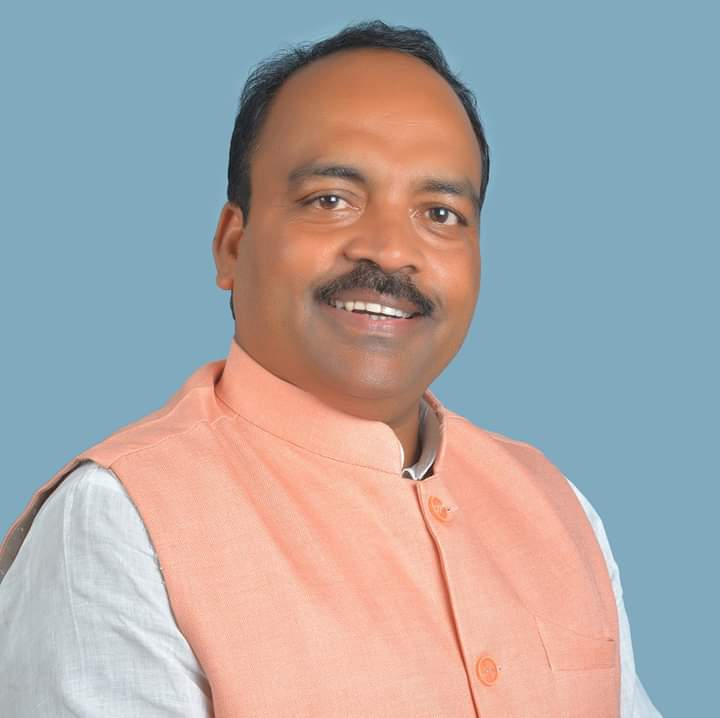

Member of the India Parliament for Bhadohi
- In office 24 May 2019 – June 2024
- Preceded by: Virendra Singh Mast
- Succeeded by: Vinod Kumar Bind
- Constituency: Bhadohi

Personal details
- Born: Ramesh Chand Bind; 7 March 1974 (age 52) Mirzapur, Uttar Pradesh, India
- Party: Samajwadi Party
- Other political affiliations: Bharatiya Janata Party (till 2024); Bahujan Samaj Party
- Spouse: Samudra Bind
- Children: 3
- Education: B. A. M. S.

Ramesh Chand Bind (born 7 March 1974) is an Indian politician and a member of the Samajwadi Party (SP). He was elected to the 17th Lok Sabha in the 2019 Indian general election, representing the Bhadohi Lok Sabha constituency in Uttar Pradesh.

== Early life ==
Bind was born on 7 March 1974 to Ram Chander and Chhabiya Devi in Mirzapur, Uttar Pradesh. He is married to Samudra Bind, with whom he has two daughters and a son. He lives in Itwa village in Mirzapur district of Uttar Pradesh. As per his election affidavit, he is qualified up to High School from S.A.B.H.S. School, Chandaipur, Mirzapur in 1988. However, his official profile states that he has the educational qualification of Bachelor of Ayurveda, Medicine and Surgery degree.

== Controversies ==
During the 2019 Indian general election, an alleged video went viral on social media in which Bind is being heard delivering a provocative speech against the upper caste Brahmin community. Bind was also being heard of selectively thrashing Brahmin community members wearing janeu and burning down a police station. A case of hurting religious sentiment and promoting enmity between different groups was registered against him. Bind, however, stated that the video was fake.
