= Rakeshdhar Tripathi =

Indian politician (born 1950)

Rakeshdhar Tripathi or Rakesh Dhar Tripathi (born 25 June 1950) is an Indian Politician who is currently a member of Apna Dal(S).

He was four times Member of Legislative Assembly in the state of Uttar Pradesh representing Handia constituency and two times minister in the Government of Uttar Pradesh. He was notably a Cabinet Minister for Higher Education from 2007 to 2011 in the 15th Legislative Assembly of Uttar Pradesh.

In December 2023, he was convicted under the Prevention of Corruption Act, 1988 for having assets disproportionate to his known source of income by a special MP/MLA court Prayagraj.

== Positions held ==
Year	Description
1985 – 1989	Elected to 9th Legislative Assembly of Uttar Pradesh
1989 – 1991	Elected to 10th Uttar Pradesh Legislative Assembly (2nd Term)
1996 – 2002	Elected to 13th Uttar Pradesh Legislative Assembly (3rd Term): Minister of State
2007 – 2012	Elected to 15th Uttar Pradesh Legislative Assembly (4th Term): Cabinet Minister for Higher Education (13 May 2007 to 25 December 2011)
