= Handia, Uttar Pradesh =

Handia
- Town
- Nagar Panchayat Handia
- Location in Uttar Pradesh, India Handia (India)
- Coordinates: 25.38°N 82.18°E
- Country: India
- State: Uttar Pradesh
- District: Prayagraj
- Elevation: 92 m (302 ft)

Population (estimate 2025)
  - Total: ~35,000

Language
  - Official: Hindi
- Time zone: UTC+5:30 (IST)
- PIN: 221503
- Telephone code: 05414
- Vehicle registration: UP-70
- Sex ratio: 871 ♂/♀

Handia is a town, near the city of Prayagraj and a nagar panchayat in the Prayagraj district of the Indian state of Uttar Pradesh.

== Mythology ==
Handia was said to be named after Hidimba. The Indian epic poem, Mahabharat's Lakshagraha, is set at the bank of river Ganga in Handia.

== Geography ==
Handia is located at 25.38°N 82.18°E. It has an average elevation of 92 metres (301 feet). It is part of an administrative area in India reachable on the G.T. Road (Grand Trunk Road) National highways of India. The main river running through the area is the Ganga, passing five kilometers south of Handia's market.

== Demographics ==
As of 2011 census, Handia had a population of 21,798, 11,493 of whom were males and 10,305 of whom were females. The population within the age group of 0 to 6 years was 3,494. The total number of literates in 2011 was 13,325, constituting 61.1% of the population, with 68.9% males and 52.5% females. The effective literacy rate of 7+ population of Handia was 72.8%, of which male literacy rate was 81.6% and female literacy rate was 62.9%. The Scheduled Castes population was 3,010. Handia had 3133 households in 2011.

As per the 2001 Census of India, Handia had a population of 12681, with 52% males and 48% females. Handia had an average literacy rate of 52%, lower than the national average of 59.5%: male literacy is 63%, and female literacy is 59%. In Handia, 20.5% of the population was under 6 years of age as of 2001. Out of these populations, 98% lived in rural areas and the rest in urban areas. There were 2245 households in 2001.

Handia assembly constituency has around 60,000 Brahmins, 70,000 Binds coming under backward classes, 90,000 Muslims, 40,000 Rajputs and 50,000 Yadav.

Estimate Population of Handia is 35000 (2025)

== Government and politics ==
Handia is one of the constituencies for assembly election of Prayagraj district in state of Uttar Pradesh. As of 2012, there were 315994 voters registered in the Handia assembly, 56% being male, and 44% female.

== Educational institutes ==
Educational institutes in the area include National Inter College, established in 1946, HMFA Engg. College organization PG College Handia, Maharshi Inter College, and Handia Polytechnic college. There is also an ayurvedic medical school in the region, named after Lal Bahadur Shastri. CBSE Schools: Prayag Public School, St. Thomas School, Dr. Devraj Public School, Mother Teresa Convent School.
