= 2022 Uttar Pradesh Legislative Assembly election =

Indian state election

- 10 February – 7 March 2022

All 403 seats in the Uttar Pradesh Legislative Assembly 202 seats needed for a majority
- Turnout: 61.03% (▼0.21 pp)
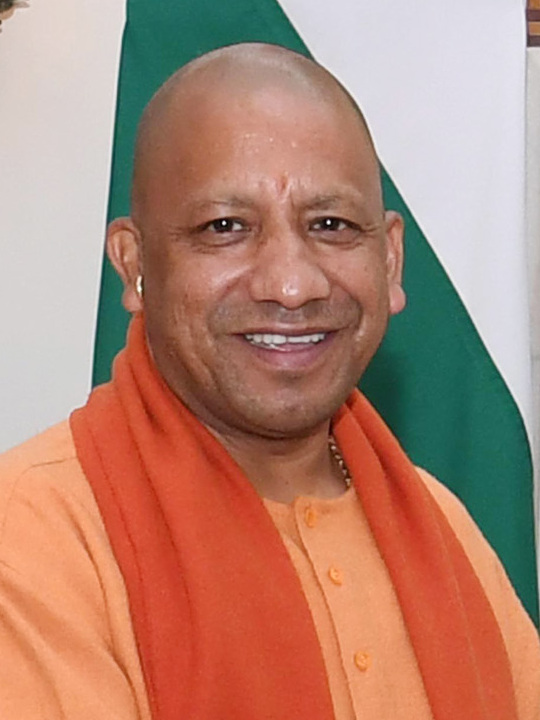

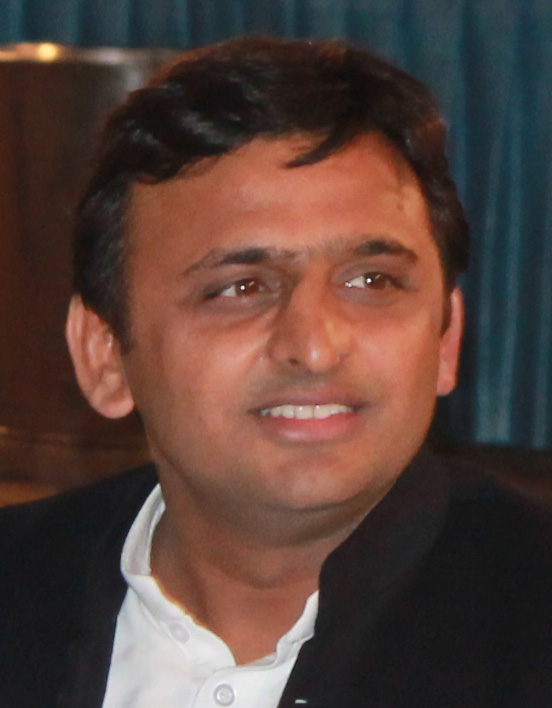

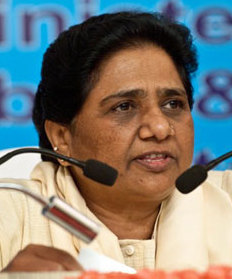
	Majority party	Minority party	Third party
Leader	Yogi Adityanath	Akhilesh Yadav	Mayawati
Party	BJP	SP	BSP
Alliance	NDA	SP+	-
Leader since	2017	2012	1995
Leader's seat	Gorakhpur Urban (Won)	Karhal (Won)	Did Not Contest
Last election	39.67%, 312 seats	21.82%, 47 seats	22.23%, 19 seats
Seats won	255	111	1
Seat change	▼57	▲64	▼18
Popular vote	38,051,721	29,543,934	11,873,137
Percentage	41.29%	32.06%	12.88%
Swing	▲1.62 pp	▲10.24 pp	▼9.35 pp
Alliance seats	273	125	1
Seat change	▼52	▲71	▼18
Percentage	43.82%	36.60%	12.88%
Swing	▲2.47 pp	▲8.53 pp	▼9.35 pp

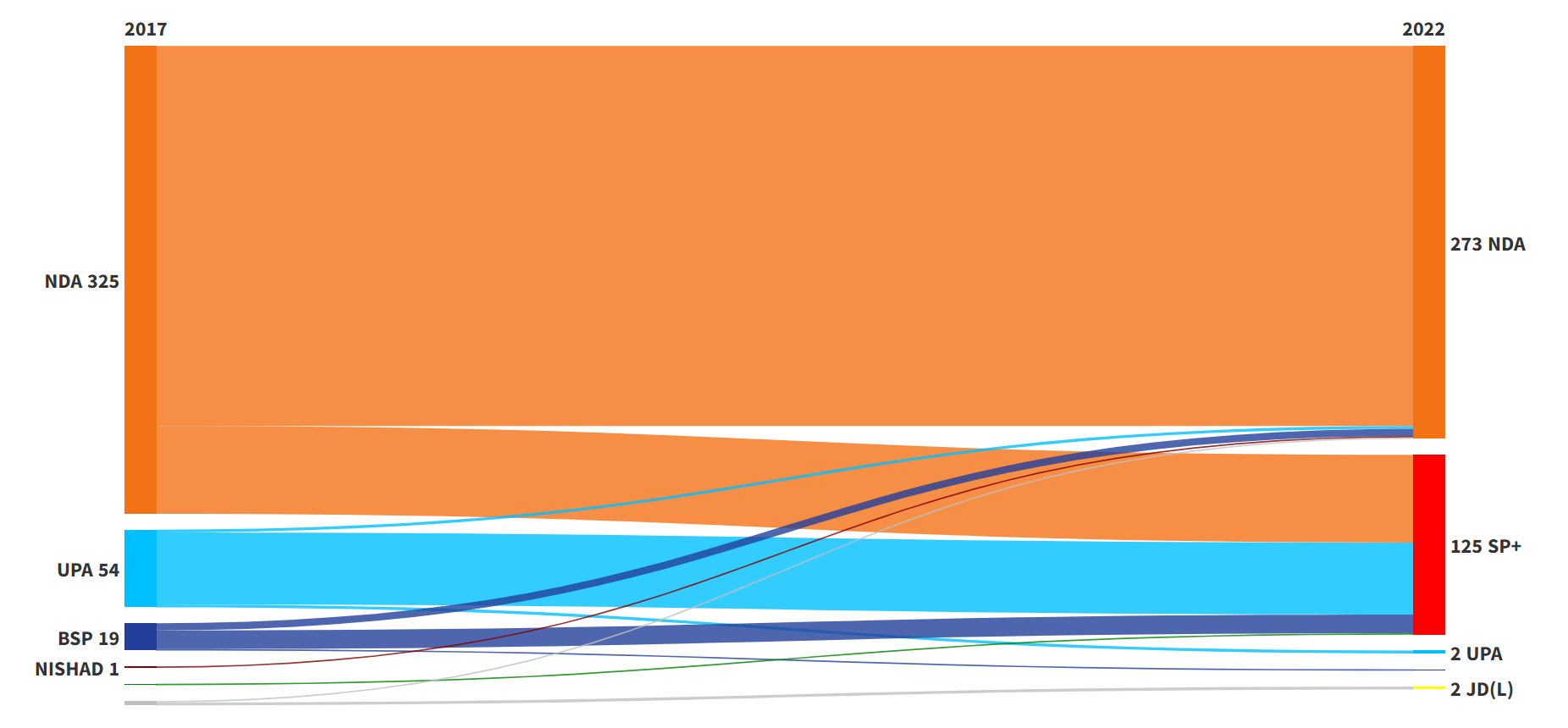
- Sankey Diagram of 2022 elections in comparision to 2017 elections
Chief Minister before election
Yogi Adityanath
BJP
Chief Minister after election
Yogi Adityanath
BJP

Legislative Assembly elections were held in the Indian state of Uttar Pradesh from 10 February to 7 March 2022 in seven phases to elect all 403 members for the 18th Uttar Pradesh Legislative Assembly. The votes were counted and the results were declared on 10 March 2022.

== Background ==
The tenure of Uttar Pradesh Legislative Assembly was scheduled to end on 14 May 2022. The previous assembly elections were held February–March 2017. After the election, Bharatiya Janata Party formed the state government, with Yogi Adityanath becoming Chief Minister.

=== Panchayat Elections ===
In the 2021 Uttar Pradesh Panchayat Elections, SP won 760 wards, followed by BJP with 720 wards. Bahujan Samaj Party won 381 and Indian National Congress won 76 wards. Independents and smaller parties won in 1,114 wards. AAP won 64 and AIMIM won 22 wards in the panchayat elections.

=== Political developments ===
In January 2022, ten BJP state legislators including three ministers, left the party and joined Samajwadi Party. On 19 January, Mulayam Singh Yadav's daughter-in-law Aparna Bisht Yadav joined BJP. She was followed by Mulayam Singh's brother-in-law Pramod Gupta who joined BJP on 20 January. On 25 January, former Union Minister and Congress leader Ratanjit Pratap Narain Singh joined BJP.

== Schedule ==
The election schedule was announced by the Election Commission of India on 8 January 2022.

Map of constituencies and their phases

Poll event	Phase						
Poll event	I	II	III	IV	V	VI	VII
Notification date	14 January 2022	21 January 2022	25 January 2022	27 January 2022	1 February 2022	4 February 2022	10 February 2022
Last date for filing nomination	21 January 2022	28 January 2022	1 February 2022	3 February 2022	8 February 2022	11 February 2022	17 February 2022
Scrutiny of nomination	24 January 2022	29 January 2022	2 February 2022	4 February 2022	9 February 2022	14 February 2022	18 February 2022
Last date for withdrawal of nomination	27 January 2022	31 January 2022	4 February 2022	7 February 2022	11 February 2022	16 February 2022	22 February 2022
Date of poll	10 February 2022	14 February 2022	20 February 2022	23 February 2022	27 February 2022	3 March 2022	7 March 2022
Date of counting of votes	10 March 2022						

Phase
I (58 ACs, 11 Districts)	II (55 ACs, 9 Districts)	III (59 ACs, 16 Districts)	IV (59 ACs, 9 Districts)	V (61 ACs, 11 Districts)	VI (57 ACs, 10 Districts)	VII (54 ACs, 9 Districts)
Shamli; Muzaffarnagar; Meerut; Baghpat; Ghaziabad; Hapur; Gautam Budh Nagar; Bulandshahr; Aligarh; Mathura; Agra	Saharanpur; Bijnor; Moradabad; Sambhal; Rampur; Amroha; Budaun; Bareilly; Shahjahanpur	Hathras; Firozabad; Kasganj; Etah; Mainpuri; Farrukhabad; Kannauj; Etawah; Auraiya; Kanpur Dehat; Kanpur Nagar; Jalaun; Jhansi; Lalitpur; Hamirpur; Mahoba	Pilibhit; Lakhimpur Kheri; Sitapur; Hardoi; Unnao; Lucknow; Rae Bareli; Banda; Fatehpur	Amethi; Sultanpur; Chitrakoot; Pratapgarh; Kaushambi; Prayagraj; Barabanki; Ayodhya; Bahraich; Shravasti; Gonda	Ambedkar Nagar; Balrampur; Siddharthnagar; Basti; Sant Kabir Nagar; Maharajganj; Gorakhpur; Kushinagar; Deoria; Ballia	Azamgarh; Mau; Ghazipur; Jaunpur; Chandauli; Varanasi; Bhadohi; Mirzapur; Sonbhadra

== Parties and alliances ==
=== National Democratic Alliance ===
National Democratic Alliance

During the month of September, the NDA confirmed an alliance between BJP, AD(S) and the NISHAD Party. During the month of August, the NDA held talks with parties like JD(U), HAM(S) and others, however the seat sharing talks fell apart later. In October, there were major restructuring efforts by the alliance with new faces and revamp of parties in an effort to battle anti-incumbency. In the first 2 weeks of December, the alliance launched it campaign for the election. On 13 Jan the national democratic alliance sealed their seat sharing pact with NISHAD Party getting 16 and Apna Dal getting 17 and BJP competing on remaining 370 seats. 6 NISHAD Party candidates would fight on BJP symbol.

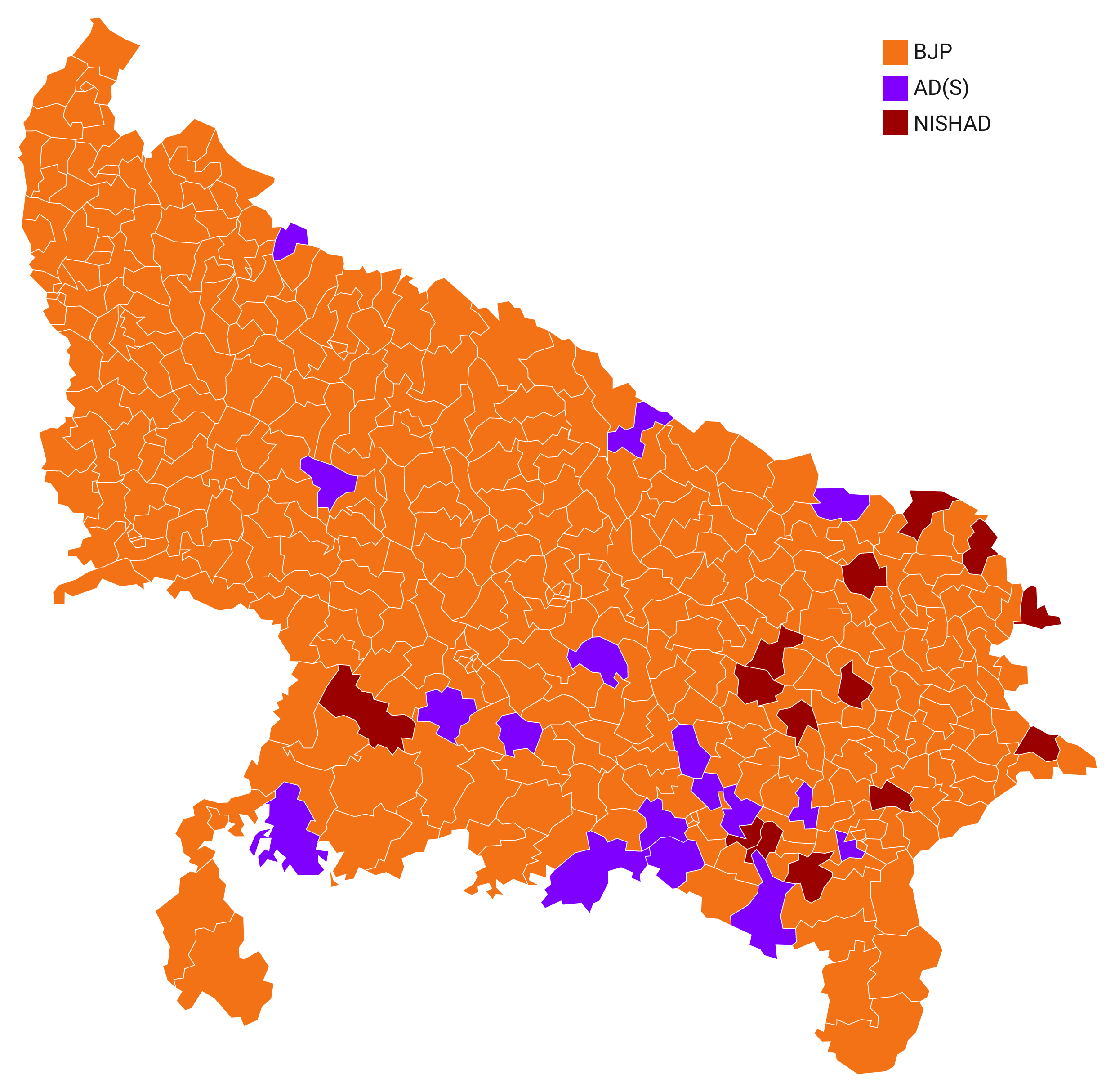
Map of the seat sharing arrangement between the parties of the NDA for the 2022 Uttar Pradesh Legislative Assembly election.

National Democratic Alliance
Party	Flag	Symbol	Leader	Seats Contested	
Bharatiya Janata Party			Yogi Adityanath	370	376
NISHAD Party			Shravan Nishad	6	376
NISHAD Party			Sanjay Nishad	10	
Apna Dal (Soneylal)			Anupriya Patel	17	
Total			403		

=== Samajwadi Party+ ===
RLD was the first to join the alliance. The NCP and RJD too joined the alliance later. Various other smaller parties too joined while SBSP broke away from its alliance to join SP alliance. During the first seat sharing talks, SP agreed to give RLD 36 seats. Initially, RLD demanded 60 seats while SP were willing to give up to 30, later both the parties finalised at 33 with RLD mostly competing in West UP. RLD gave 9 symbol of SP candidates. Aam Aadmi Party and Samajwadi Party began talks for alliance, however they couldn't agree on seat sharing. Pragatisheel Samajwadi Party (Lohiya) joined the alliance later. On 13 January 2022, the alliance announced its initial candidates for the first few phases of the election. SP and SBSP would have a friendly fight on 1 seat while SP and AD(K) would have a friendly fight on 2 seats.

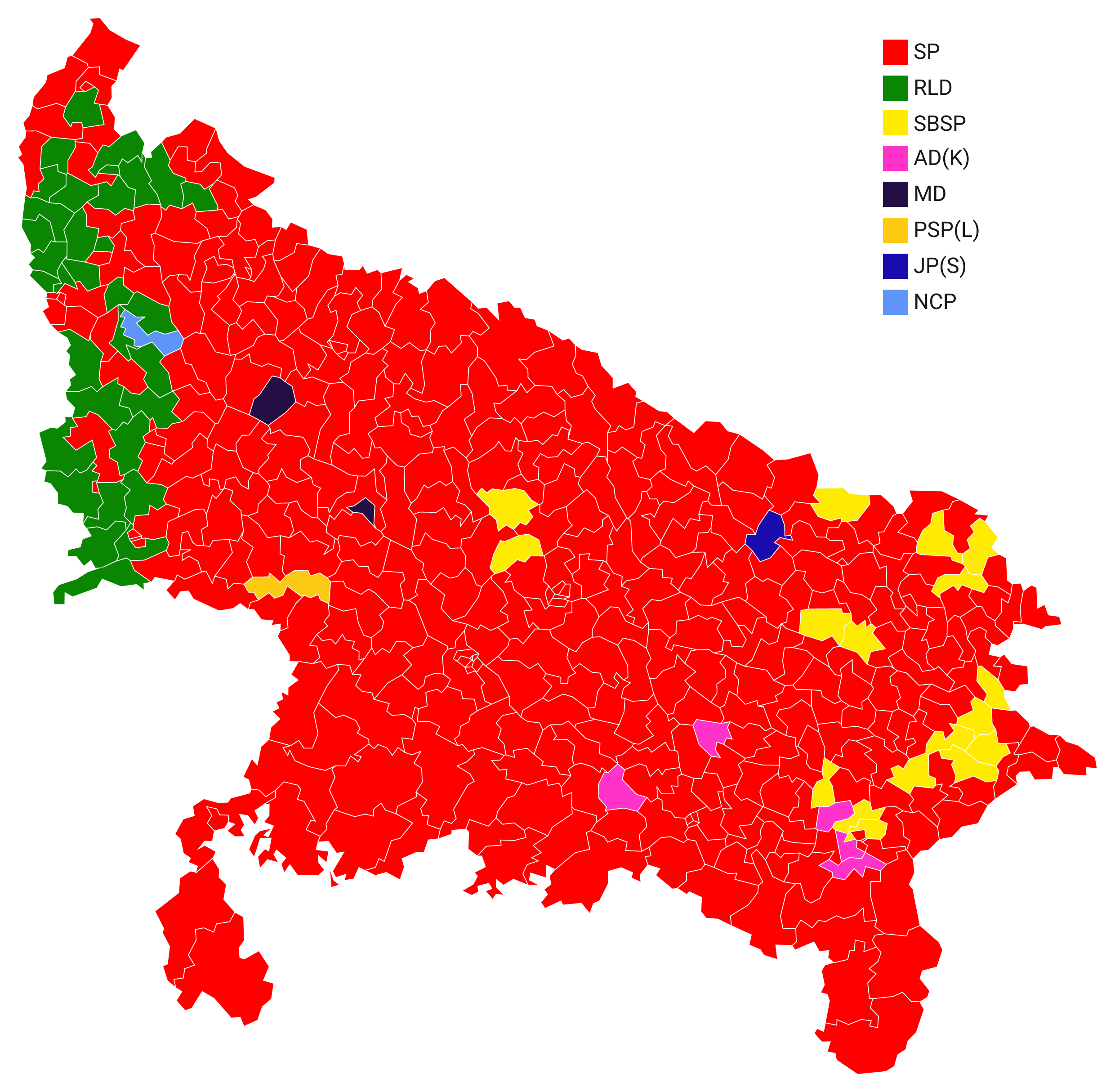
Map of the seat sharing arrangement between the parties of the SP+ for the 2022 Uttar Pradesh Legislative Assembly election.

Samajwadi Party led Alliance
Party	Flag	Symbol	Leader	Seats	
Samajwadi Party			Akhilesh Yadav	347	352
Pragatisheel Samajwadi Party			Shivpal Singh Yadav	1	352
Mahan Dal			Keshav Dev Maurya	2	352
Janvadi Party (Socialist)			Sanjay Chauhan	1	352
Apna Dal (Kamerawadi)			Dr. Pallavi Patel	1	352
Apna Dal (Kamerawadi)			Krishna Patel	4	
Rashtriya Lok Dal			Jayant Chaudhary	33	
Suheldev Bharatiya Samaj Party			Om Prakash Rajbhar	17	
Nationalist Congress Party			K. K. Sharma	1	
Total				403	

=== Bahujan Samaj Party ===
Unlike in previous years, the Bahujan Samaj Party announced that it would compete in the election all by itself. BSP went into an alliance with ten small political parties, namely the India Janshakti Party, Pacchasi Parivartan Samaj Party, Vishwa Shanti Party, Sanyukt Janadesh Party, Adarsh Sangram Party, Akhand Vikas Bharat Party, Sarvajan Awaz Party, Jagruk Janata Party and Sarvajan Sewa Party for their extended support to BSP.

No.	Party	Flag	Symbol	Leader	Photo	Seats contested	Male candidates	Female candidates
1.	Bahujan Samaj Party			Mayawati		403	366	37

=== Indian National Congress ===
On 19 October 2021, Uttar Pradesh Congress leader Priyanka Gandhi announced 40% of tickets to women in upcoming Uttar Pradesh assembly polls.

No.	Party	Flag	Symbol	Leader	Photo	Seats contested	Male candidates	Female candidates
1.	Indian National Congress			Priyanka Gandhi		399	244	155

=== All India Majlis-e-Ittehadul Muslimeen ===
All India Majlis-e-Ittehadul Muslimeen, Jan Adhikar Party, Bharat Mukti Morcha, Janata Kranti Party and Bharatiya Vanchit Samaj Party have formed a front to contest all 403 seats.

No.	Party	Flag	Symbol	Leader	Photo	Seats contested	Male candidates	Female candidates
1.	All India Majlis-e-Ittehadul Muslimeen			Shaukat Ali		95	90	5
2.	Jan Adhikar Party			Babu Singh Kushwaha		137	119	18
3.	Bharat Mukti Morcha			Waman Meshram		TBD	TBD	TBD
4.	Janata Kranti Party			Anil Singh Chauhan		TBD	TBD	TBD
5.	Bharatiya Vanchit Samaj Party			Ram Prasad Kashyap		TBD	TBD	TBD
6.	Peace Party of India			Mohamed Ayub		TBD	TBD	TBD
7.	Rashtriya Ulama Council			Aamir Rashadi Madni		TBD	TBD	TBD

=== Left Front ===
Left Front

No.	Party	Flag	Symbol	Leader	Photo	Seats contested	Male candidates	Female candidates
1.	Communist Party of India			Girish Sharma		35	34	1
2.	Communist Party of India (Marxist)			Heera Lal Yadav		3 (Note: CPI(M) supported Samajwadi Party led alliance in all other seats.)	3	0
3.	Communist Party of India (Marxist–Leninist) Liberation			Sudhakar Yadav		11	9	2
4.	All India Forward Bloc			S.N. Singh Chouhan		3	3	0
5.	Socialist Unity Centre of India (Communist)			V.N. Singh		9	9	0

=== Others ===
During the month leading up to the elections major political parties which aren't part of any alliance announced their intentions to compete in the election.

- AAP announced that it would compete on all 403 seats but later contested on 349 seats including Charthawal Assembly constituency where the AAP candidate joined SP on poll eve. AAP started an alliance discussion with SP but the talks for alliance did not succeed.
- Shiv Sena announced they would compete all 403 seat in the election which was later reduced to 36 seats.
- AIMIM originally was part of alliance and was given a seat share of 100 seats, however when SBSP broke the alliance to join hands with SP, AIMIM confirmed they would fight the election alone in 95 seats.

Later parties like VSIP, LJP (Ram Vilas), Rashtriya Rashtrawadi Party, ABHM and ASPKR also confirmed their participation in the election

No.	Party	Flag	Symbol	Leader	Photo	Seats contested	Male candidates	Female candidates
1.	Aam Aadmi Party			Sanjay Singh		349	319	30
2.	Janata Dal (United)					27	26	1
3.	Shiv Sena			Thakur Singh		36	29	7
4.	Jansatta Dal (Loktantrik)			Raghuraj Pratap Singh		16	15	1
5.	Vikassheel Insaan Party			Mukesh Sahani		53	47	6
6.	Lok Janshakti Party (Ram Vilas)			Chirag Paswan		21	20	1
7.	Azad Samaj Party (Kanshi Ram)			Chandra Shekhar Aazad		110	104	6

== Manifestos ==
=== NDA ===
On 8 February, BJP released its manifesto titled "Lok Sankalp Patra", ahead of the 1st phase of the elections. Some of the promises in it being:

- Pradhan Mantri Kisan Samman Nidhi (PMKISAN) scheme for landless farmers
- Scooty for female students and working women
- Free coaching to female students preparing for UPSC and PSC
- Laptops and other gadgets needed for online education for students
- Give at least 1 job to each household
- 3 free LPG cylinders to consumers each year under Ujjwala Yojna

=== BSP ===
BSP announced that it will not release election manifesto.

=== UPA ===
INC released its manifesto in three tranches. The first tranche "Shakti Vidhan" was released on 19 December 2021 which centered on women welfare. The second tranche "Bharti Vidhan" was released on 21 January 2022 which centered on youth welfare. The final tranche "Unnati Vidhan" was released on 9 February 2022 which centered on overall development and general issues.

Some key promises made in the manifesto are:

- All farmers' debts shall be waived.
- Paddy and wheat shall be procured at ₹2,500 per quintal and sugarcane shall be procured at ₹400 per quintal
- Electricity bills shall be reduced by half and pending arrears from the COVID-19 period shall be waived
- ₹25,000 shall be provided to families worst-affected by COVID-19
- The backlog of 20 lakh jobs in the public sector shall be filled, including 8 lakh jobs for women
- Every girl in 10th and 12th standard will be given a smartphone and every woman enrolled in a graduate programme will be given an electric scooty
- 40% of Vidhan Sabha tickets will be given to women
- The fees for all examination forms will be waived and travel by bus and trains would be made free
- Fulfilment of all vacant seats in state healthcare hospitals
- Encouragement to industries, tourism, small and medium scale industries
- To boost startups in the state, a ‘Seed Startup Fund’ worth ₹5,000 crore (US$530 million) would be set up, prioritising the entrepreneurs below 30 years of age
- All the vacant posts for Sanskrit, Urdu teachers Anganwadi, Asha and so on will also be filled
- In the basic education sector, the shortage of one lakh head teachers will be met

=== SP+ ===
Samajwadi Party released its manifesto on 8 February 2022.

The National President of Samajwadi Party Akhilesh Yadav released his party's 88-page manifesto for the elections. Under the motto "Satya Vachan, Atoot Vaada" (transl. Truth and Unbroken promises), the manifesto is laden with promises to farmers, women and the youth. Some key points from the party's manifesto are:

- Minimum support price (MSP) for all crops
- All farmers to be debt-free by 2025
- Free power for irrigation, interest-free loan and insurance as well as pension benefits to farmers
- ₹25 lakh (US$27,000) compensation to kin of farmers who died during farm protests
- Efforts to provide 22 lakh jobs in IT sector
- Urban employment guarantee act along lines of MGNREGS to boost jobs
- 33 per cent reservation for women of all communities (SCs/STs/General) in government jobs including police force
- Microfinance bank to help micro, small and medium enterprises (MSME)
- 300 units of free power to domestic consumers
- Free Wi-Fi zones in all villages and cities
- Further modernisation and upgradation of police and health infrastructure
- Dial 1890 Mazdoor Power Line- will be launched for migrant labourers
- Zero tolerance for organised crimes and hate crimes against women, minorities and Dalits

== Campaigns ==
Samyukt Kisan Morcha (SKM), the umbrella body of farmers, campaigned against the ruling BJP by organising public meetings and rallies asking farmers to not vote for BJP. SKM had organised the 2020–2021 Indian farmers' protest against the controversial three farm acts which were passed by the BJP-led Union Government in the BJP controlled Parliament of India in September 2020. These laws were eventually withdrawn by the Union government.

On 31 January 2022, the farmer leaders observed "Vishwasghat Diwas" (treachery day) across India after the Union government failed to fulfil promises that were made to the farmers during the withdrawal of agitation against three farm laws. SKM leaders have warned that the farm laws may be re-introduced if BJP wins the elections.

According to the SKM leaders the promises that BJP made to the farmers in the 2022 manifesto were also made in the 2017 election manifesto, but they were not implemented. Neither the income of the farmer was doubled nor they got Minimum support Price (MSP) for their produce.

SKM leaders launched "Mission UP and Uttarakhand" and appealed to the voters to not vote for BJP calling them anti-farmer. The appeal did not make any recommendation to vote for any specific political party. SKM's appeal was supported by 57 farmer organisations. Since the campaign rallies were banned due to COVID-19 pandemic in India, leaflets with the appeal were handed to the villagers.

=== Policy positions ===
==== Farm laws ====
BJP's Union Agriculture Minister Narendra Singh Tomar in December 2021, had said that BJP brought the 3 agriculture amendment laws (repealed in 2021). "But the government is not disappointed. We moved a step back and we will move forward again because farmers are India's backbone."

The INC and AAP are against the farm laws and had supported the farmers' unions during their year-long protest against the farm laws.

Samajwadi Party chief Akhilesh Yadav has stated that after forming the government in Uttar Pradesh, SP will not allow the implementation of any anti-farmer laws in Uttar Pradesh. He warned the farmers against BJP, and said that BJP had withdrawn the controversial farm laws to get votes from the farmers. SP's alliance partner Rashtriya Lok Dal is also against the implementation of farm laws.

=== Election issues ===
Citing a survey from all constituencies of UP, DNA news reported that unemployment was the biggest issue for 73% of the voters. Inflation and price rise was second with 65% voter support. Development was 54% and stray animal was an issue for 39% voters.

==== Stray cow ====
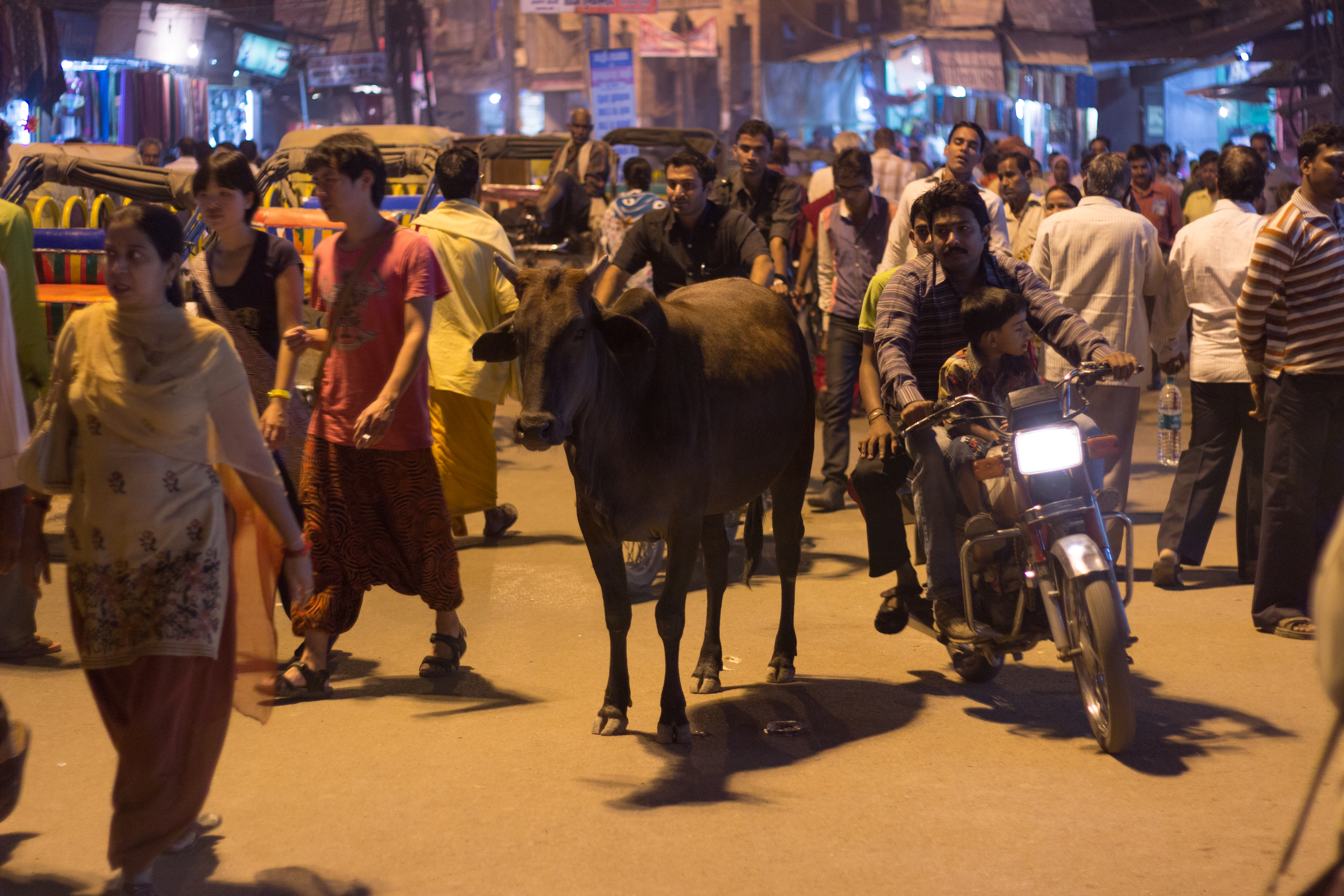
Stray cow on a busy street in Varanasi

Slaughter of cow is illegal in most places in the country. The anti slaughter laws were not strictly enforced until 2014. Cows are considered holy in Hinduism, yet the farmers regularly took their old cows to slaughter houses until the years before 2014 when BJP's Narendra Modi government won the general election.

The deadly stray cow attacks on humans and crops in both the urban and rural areas is an issue for the residents. In 2017, after coming to power, the Yogi Adityanath government had promised to build cattle shelters to better manage the stray cattle. Since BJP came to power in 2017, cow slaughter has been made illegal in 18 states in India including UP. Since then the trading of male cattle has reduced due to the fear of arrest, persecution, lynching by cow vigilantes. The farmers, unable to sell them, abandon them to wander on the roads and feed on standing crops.

The Adityanath ministry in the state of Uttar Pradesh introduced a special alcohol tax to earn money and maintain thousands of cow sheds operated by the government. The BBC reported that the tax did not solve the problem of stray cow and the cow sheds were found to be over crowded.

BJP state government claims to have provided money to the village pradhans to set up cow shelters to keep the stray cattle. Deccan Herald reported that it could not find cattle shelters in the villages of Sitapur, Lakhimpur Kheri, Hardoi and Unnao districts. Places that had cow shelters, were already full with no capacity to keep more cattle.

BJP leaders refused to accept that the stray cattle was an issue, even though the farmers consider it an issue. Speaking at a rally in Kanpur in February, PM Narendra Modi acknowledged the problem in his rally and said the Yogi government is trying to solve the problem by setting up cattle shelters.

The Samajwadi Party promised compensation of 5 Lakh ₹ for farmers who were killed by bulls. SP promised to fix the root cause of the problem, removing the fear in trading of livestock without any trouble or harassment. Akhilesh Yadav said that the farmers were forced to guard their crops to prevent it from being grazen by stray animals. He said that his government will make arrangements to take care of the cattle.

The Congress Party promised compensation of ₹3,000 per acre for damaged crops. It also promised a Godhan Nyay Yojana along the lines of a similar scheme in Chhattisgarh including the purchase of cow dung (gobar) for ₹2 per kilogram to promote organic farming and vermi-composting by Self-Help Groups. It promised an amount of ₹500 per stray animal that is turned into a village Gaushala for a fixed period.

On 22 February, the local farmers released hundreds of cattle at the venue of the election rally in Barabanki located 40 km from the state capital Lucknow. The act was to highlight the menace of the stray cattle in the area. In a viral video of the incident, hundreds of unattended cattle were seen roaming in the open rally ground.

==== Roads ====
Lack of roads was a major poll issue for people in Amethi.

==== Petrol diesel price ====
Akhilesh Yadav, Rahul Gandhi, Priyanka Gandhi Vadra campaigned on the massive increase in the price of petrol and diesel under the BJP government. Akhilesh claimed that soon after the UP elections are over the government will increase the price even more.

==== Inflation ====
Akhilesh Yadav stated that public will not be hit with inflation if SP alliance wins the election.

==== Unemployment ====
Akhilesh Yadav stated that he will give jobs to people and end the problem of unemployment. He also promised early recruitment for the Police and Army.

==== COVID-19 ====
The government's handling of the COVID-19 pandemic in India was criticised by Priyanka Gandhi, Arvind Kejriwal and Akhilesh Yadav who stated that the people were not given the needed help. Akhilesh accused the BJP government of hiding the actual data and fudging the data of Covid related deaths.

== Incidents ==
=== Voting Machine malfunction ===
In the first, third and fourth phase of election, Electronic Voter Machine (EVM) malfunction was reported at several places. Talking about the first phase of elections, the Additional Chief Election Officer said that the malfunctioning machines were replaced after reports of malfunctions.

=== Unattended VVPAT slips ===
On 4 March, in Basti, Uttar Pradesh, a large number of VVPAT slips were found unattended on ground near the strong room where the EVMs were kept prior to counting. The slips were found by children out for playing. After the news of discovery of slips spread, a large crowd gathered that included party members and candidates along with members of the administration. According to the district officials, those slips may have been from the mock drill before election but admitted they should not have been thrown out. The administration assured investigation into the incident and action on the people involved.

=== Voting Machine theft ===
On 8 March 2022, in Varanasi, a truck carrying multiple EVMs was caught by the members of the Samajwadi Party in Varanasi. Samajwadi Party chief Akhilesh Yadav said that SP members had caught one truck while two other trucks fled. According to the guidelines of Election Commission (EC) the EVMs cannot be moved without the consent of the contesting candidates, yet the Varanasi District Magistrate (DM) was transporting them without informing the local candidates. Yadav alleged that the Electronic Voting machines caught were being stolen from a EVM counting centre in Varanasi. The incident had occurred two days before the scheduled counting of votes on 10 March. Videos of the incident were also circulated on social media.

The DM of Varanasi said that the EVMs in the incident were the ones used for training. Yadav said, "Now that the EVMs have been caught, the officials will make multiple excuses". He called the candidates and party supporters to be alert to prevent any attempt of rigging during the vote counting. The SP+ alliance complained about the incident to the Election commission (EC). The EC had assured action in the incident. Yadav addressed a press conference where he accused the Election Commission officials of EVM tampering and added that he had lost trust on the EC. He said "We need to be alert if EVMs are being transported this way. This is theft. We need to save our votes. We may go to court against it but before that, I want to appeal to people to save democracy."

Varanasi police commissioner had admitted to lapses in the incident. Samajwadi Party had shared the video of the admission calling it an admission that EC protocol had not been followed by the officials. The Election Commission ordered action against Varanasi Additional District Magistrate and suspended him from his post for violating the rules in transportation of EVMs. According to the District Magistrate the EVMs were planned to be moved in the morning of 9 January, but the suspended Additional District Magistrate had taken them out in the previous night without providing the necessary information to others.

=== Postal ballot in garbage truck ===
On 9 March, in Bareilly three boxes full of election voting material (blank postal ballot) were discovered in the garbage trucks of city municipality. The truck was in the warehouse where voting machines and ballot papers were kept. The incident video was viral in the social media. Police and district administration arrived to meet Samajwadi party members regarding the incident and assured to take actions on their complaint. The Election commission acted on the complaint and removed the involved election official along with the SDM from their post.

On the same day in Moradabad 2 boxes of ballot paper was found by SP members in the truck operated by municipality.

In Sonbhadra district a box full of ballot papers was found in a truck accompanied by SDM's vehicle. Both vehicles were stopped outside the ballot counting center when they were trying to enter. The SDM was accused by SP members of replacing the ballot papers. Election commission ordered the SDM to be removed from his post.

=== Vote rigging allegations ===
Controversy related to the security of the electronic voting machines happened in 10 districts of UP. In Lucknow members of all parties except ruling BJP were present to guard the voting machines. In Jalaun a car that was frequently moving in and out of the strong room was checked by SP workers who found hardware tools in the car.

In Sultanpur a truck full of boxes of EVM was found near the strong room, storing voting equipments. The SP workers guarding the strong room refused to let the truck enter the premises. The district officials claimed the boxes were empty. After ruckus, the district authority ordered that no voting related equipments should be moved before 11 March (the counting of vote was scheduled on 10 March).

Akhilesh Yadav alleged that the Office of the UP Chief Minister was making attempts to influence the counting of votes.

Election officer had asked details of the incident in Bareilly and Varanasi from the district administration for Election Commission to take a final decision on the incidents. Election Commission suspended the Varanasi ADM, Bareilly SDM and Sonbhadra SDM from election related duties.

== Poll predictions ==
=== Opinion polls ===
Polling aggregates
Active Parties
National Democratic Alliance
Samajwadi Party+
Bahujan Samaj Party
United Progressive Alliance
Others

View source data.
View source data.

Date Published	Polling agency						Lead
Date Published	Polling agency	NDA	SP+	BSP	UPA	Others	Lead
18 March 2021	ABP-CVoter	41.0%	24.4%	20.8%	5.9%	7.9%	16.6%
3 September 2021	ABP-CVoter	41.8%	30.2%	15.7%	5.1%	7.2%	11.6%
8 October 2021	ABP-CVoter	41.3%	32.4%	14.7%	5.6%	6.0%	8.9%
13 November 2021	ABP-CVoter	40.7%	31.1%	15.1%	9.0%	4.1%	9.6%
11 December 2021	ABP-CVoter	40.4%	33.6%	13.2%	7.3%	5.5%	6.8%
10 January 2022	ABP-CVoter	41.5%	33.3%	12.9%	7.1%	5.3%	8.2%
23 January 2022	Polstrat-NewsX	40.9%	36.4%	12.3%	5.9%	4.5%	4.5%

Date Published	Polling agency						Lead	Remarks
Date Published	Polling agency	NDA	SP+	BSP	UPA	Others	Lead	Remarks
18 March 2021	ABP-CVoter	284-294	54-64	33-43	1-7	10-16	220-240	NDA majority
3 September 2021	ABP-CVoter	259-267	109-117	12-16	3-7	6-10	142-158	NDA majority
8 October 2021	ABP-CVoter	241-249	130-138	15-19	3-7	0-4	103-119	NDA majority
13 November 2021	ABP-CVoter	213-221	152-160	16-20	6-10	NA	53-69	NDA majority
11 December 2021	ABP-CVoter	212-224	151-163	12-24	2-10	2-6	49-73	NDA majority
10 January 2022	ABP-CVoter	223-235	145-157	8-16	3-7	4-8	66-90	NDA majority
23 January 2022	Polstrat-NewsX	218-223	152-157	19-22	5-6	0-2	61-71	NDA majority
10 March 2022	Election results	273	125	1	2	2	148	NDA majority

=== Exit polls ===
The Election Commission banned the media from publishing exit polls between 7 AM on 10 February 2022 and 6:30 PM on 7 March 2022. With an imprisonment of two years for the violation of the directive. Accordingly, these exit polls were published in the evening of 7 March 2022.

Polling agency						Lead	Remarks
Polling agency	NDA	SP+	BSP	UPA	Others	Lead	Remarks
ABP News - CVoter	228-244	132-148	13-21	4-8	NA	80-112	NDA majority
India Today - Axis My India	288-326	71-101	3-9	1-3	2-3	187-255	NDA majority
News18 Matrize	262-277	119-134	7-15	3-8	0	128-158	NDA majority
NewsX Polstrat	223	153	19	6	2	70	NDA majority
Republic P-Marq	240	140	17	4	2	100	NDA majority
Times Now-Veto	225	151	9	4		74	NDA majority
News 24 Today's Chanakya	294(+/-19)	105	2	1	1	189	NDA majority
Zee - Design Boxed	223-248	138-157	5-11	4-9	3-5	66-110	NDA majority
India TV - CNX	240-250	140-150	6-12	2-4	0-2	100-110	NDA majority

== Voter turnout ==
Phase	Date	Seats	Districts	District Turnout (%)	Phase Turnout (%)
I	10 February 2022	58	Shamli	69.42	62.54 ▼0.93
I	10 February 2022	58	Muzaffarnagar	66.75	62.54 ▼0.93
I	10 February 2022	58	Meerut	64.96	62.54 ▼0.93
I	10 February 2022	58	Baghpat	65.42	62.54 ▼0.93
I	10 February 2022	58	Ghaziabad	55.10	62.54 ▼0.93
I	10 February 2022	58	Hapur	67.68	62.54 ▼0.93
I	10 February 2022	58	Gautam Budh; Nagar	57.07	62.54 ▼0.93
I	10 February 2022	58	Bulandshahr	65.17	62.54 ▼0.93
I	10 February 2022	58	Aligarh	61.37	62.54 ▼0.93
I	10 February 2022	58	Mathura	63.56	62.54 ▼0.93
I	10 February 2022	58	Agra	60.94	62.54 ▼0.93
II	14 February 2022	55	Saharanpur	71.55	64.66 ▼1.03
II	14 February 2022	55	Bijnor	66.68	64.66 ▼1.03
II	14 February 2022	55	Moradabad	67.38	64.66 ▼1.03
II	14 February 2022	55	Sambhal	62.94	64.66 ▼1.03
II	14 February 2022	55	Rampur	65.21	64.66 ▼1.03
II	14 February 2022	55	Amroha	72.28	64.66 ▼1.03
II	14 February 2022	55	Budaun	59.49	64.66 ▼1.03
II	14 February 2022	55	Bareilly	62.90	64.66 ▼1.03
II	14 February 2022	55	Shahjahanpur	59.26	64.66 ▼1.03
III	20 February 2022	59	Hathras	63.22	62.49 ▲0.11
III	20 February 2022	59	Firozabad	64.40	62.49 ▲0.11
III	20 February 2022	59	Kasganj	63.04	62.49 ▲0.11
III	20 February 2022	59	Etah	65.70	62.49 ▲0.11
III	20 February 2022	59	Mainpuri	63.96	62.49 ▲0.11
III	20 February 2022	59	Farrukhabad	60.08	62.49 ▲0.11
III	20 February 2022	59	Kannauj	62.09	62.49 ▲0.11
III	20 February 2022	59	Etawah	61.79	62.49 ▲0.11
III	20 February 2022	59	Auraiya	61.30	62.49 ▲0.11
III	20 February 2022	59	Kanpur Dehat	62.49	62.49 ▲0.11
III	20 February 2022	59	Kanpur Nagar	57.50	62.49 ▲0.11
III	20 February 2022	59	Jalaun	59.93	62.49 ▲0.11
III	20 February 2022	59	Jhansi	65.61	62.49 ▲0.11
III	20 February 2022	59	Lalitpur	71.36	62.49 ▲0.11
III	20 February 2022	59	Hamirpur	64.02	62.49 ▲0.11
III	20 February 2022	59	Mahoba	64.59	62.49 ▲0.11
IV	23 February 2022	59	Pilibhit	69.20	62.82 ▲0.12
IV	23 February 2022	59	Lakhimpur Kheri	68.43	62.82 ▲0.12
IV	23 February 2022	59	Sitapur	65.10	62.82 ▲0.12
IV	23 February 2022	59	Hardoi	60.32	62.82 ▲0.12
IV	23 February 2022	59	Unnao	59.34	62.82 ▲0.12
IV	23 February 2022	59	Lucknow	60.44	62.82 ▲0.12
IV	23 February 2022	59	Rae Bareli	62.06	62.82 ▲0.12
IV	23 February 2022	59	Banda	61.88	62.82 ▲0.12
IV	23 February 2022	59	Fatehpur	60.07	62.82 ▲0.12
V	27 February 2022	61	Amethi	56.00	58.33 ▼0.06
V	27 February 2022	61	Sultanpur	57.59	58.33 ▼0.06
V	27 February 2022	61	Chitrakoot	62.88	58.33 ▼0.06
V	27 February 2022	61	Pratapgarh	54.29	58.33 ▼0.06
V	27 February 2022	61	Kaushambi	59.73	58.33 ▼0.06
V	27 February 2022	61	Prayagraj	53.73	58.33 ▼0.06
V	27 February 2022	61	Barabanki	68.64	58.33 ▼0.06
V	27 February 2022	61	Ayodhya	61.27	58.33 ▼0.06
V	27 February 2022	61	Bahraich	59.73	58.33 ▼0.06
V	27 February 2022	61	Shravasti	59.59	58.33 ▼0.06
V	27 February 2022	61	Gonda	57.37	58.33 ▼0.06
VI	3 March 2022	57	Ambedkar Nagar	62.66	55.79 ▼0.87
VI	3 March 2022	57	Balrampur	48.90	55.79 ▼0.87
VI	3 March 2022	57	Siddharthanagar	51.60	55.79 ▼0.87
VI	3 March 2022	57	Basti	57.20	55.79 ▼0.87
VI	3 March 2022	57	Sant Kabir Nagar	52.20	55.79 ▼0.87
VI	3 March 2022	57	Maharajganj	59.5	55.79 ▼0.87
VI	3 March 2022	57	Gorakhpur	58.89	55.79 ▼0.87
VI	3 March 2022	57	Kushinagar	59.00	55.79 ▼0.87
VI	3 March 2022	57	Deoria	56.00	55.79 ▼0.87
VI	3 March 2022	57	Ballia	52.01	55.79 ▼0.87
VII	7 March 2022	54	Azamgarh	57.49	58.88 ▼0.68
VII	7 March 2022	54	Mau	57.79	58.88 ▼0.68
VII	7 March 2022	54	Jaunpur	57.18	58.88 ▼0.68
VII	7 March 2022	54	Ghazipur	59.13	58.88 ▼0.68
VII	7 March 2022	54	Chandauli	62.77	58.88 ▼0.68
VII	7 March 2022	54	Varanasi	60.58	58.88 ▼0.68
VII	7 March 2022	54	Bhadohi	57.43	58.88 ▼0.68
VII	7 March 2022	54	Mirzapur	60.34	58.88 ▼0.68
VII	7 March 2022	54	Sonbhadra	59.05	58.88 ▼0.68
Total		403			

== Results ==
Vote Share by alliance
1. NDA (43.8%)
2. SP+ (36.6%)
3. BSP (12.9%)
4. INC (2.33%)
5. Other (4.37%)
Seat Share
1. NDA (67.7%)
2. SP+ (31.0%)
3. Other (1.24%)

=== Results by alliance and party ===
Party	BJP	AD(S)	NISHAD	SP	RLD	SBSP	INC	BSP	JD(L)
Seats	255	12	6	111	8	6	2	1	2
Alliance	NDA			SP+			Others
Seats	273			125			5

Alliance	Party	Popular vote			Seats		
Alliance	Party	Votes	%	±pp	Contested	Won	+/−
NDA	Bharatiya Janata Party	38,051,721	41.29	▲1.62	376	255	▼57
NDA	Apna Dal (Sonelal)	1,493,181	1.62	▲0.4	17	12	▲3
NDA	NISHAD Party	840,584	0.91	▲0.29	10	6	▲5
NDA	Total	40,385,487	43.82	▲2.47	403	273	▼52
SP+	Samajwadi Party	29,543,934	32.06	▲10.24	347	111	▲64
SP+	Rashtriya Lok Dal	2,630,168	2.85	1.07	33	8	▲8
SP+	Suheldev Bharatiya Samaj Party	1,252,925	1.36	▲0.66	19	6	▲2
SP+	Apna Dal (Kamerawadi)	258,103	0.28	▲0.278	6	1	Steady
SP+	Nationalist Congress Party	44,180	0.05	▲0.05	1	0	Steady
SP+	Total	33,729,510	36.60	▲8.53	402	125	▲71
None	Bahujan Samaj Party	11,873,137	12.88	▼9.35	403	1	▼18
None	Jansatta Dal (Loktantrik)	191,874	0.21	▲0.21	16	2	▲2
UPA	Indian National Congress	2,151,234	2.33	▼3.92	399	2	▼5
BPM	All India Majlis-e-Ittehadul Muslimeen	450,929	0.49	▲0.25	94	0	Steady
BPM	Jan Adhikar Party	180,645	0.19	▲0.15	39	0	Steady
None	Aam Aadmi Party	347,187	0.38	▲0.38	349	0	Steady
None	Aazad Samaj Party (Kanshi Ram)	1,19,564	0.13	New entry	111	0	New entry
None	Independents	1,024,193	1.11	▼1.46	1025	0	▼3
None	Others		1.49				
None	NOTA	637,313	0.69	▼0.18			
None	Total			92,162,897	100		
Valid votes		92,162,897	99.85				
Invalid votes		138,127	0.15				
Votes cast/ turnout		92,301,024	61.03				
Abstentions		58,945,144	38.97				
Registered voters		151,246,168					

=== Results by division ===
Division	Seats					
Division	Seats	NDA	SP+	UPA	BSP	OTH
Saharanpur	16	7	9	—N/a	—N/a	—N/a
Moradabad	27	10	17	—N/a	—N/a	—N/a
Bareilly	25	20	5	—N/a	—N/a	—N/a
Lucknow	46	39	7	—N/a	—N/a	—N/a
Devipatan	20	16	4	—N/a	—N/a	—N/a
Basti	13	7	6	—N/a	—N/a	—N/a
Gorakhpur	28	27	—N/a	1	—N/a	—N/a
Meerut	28	23	5	—N/a	—N/a	—N/a
Aligarh	17	15	2	—N/a	—N/a	—N/a
Agra	23	18	5	—N/a	—N/a	—N/a
Kanpur	27	20	7	—N/a	—N/a	—N/a
Ayodhya	25	12	13	—N/a	—N/a	—N/a
Azamgarh	21	3	17	—N/a	1	—N/a
Jhansi	9	8	1	—N/a	—N/a	—N/a
Chitrakoot	10	8	2	—N/a	—N/a	—N/a
Prayagraj	28	14	11	1	—N/a	2
Varanasi	28	15	13	—N/a	—N/a	—N/a
Mirzapur	12	11	1	—N/a	—N/a	—N/a
Total	403	273	125	2	1	2

=== Results by district ===
Division	District	Seats					
Division	District	Seats	NDA	SP+	UPA	BSP	OTH
Saharanpur	Saharanpur	7	5	2	—N/a	—N/a	—N/a
Saharanpur	Shamli	3	—N/a	3	—N/a	—N/a	—N/a
Saharanpur	Muzaffarnagar	6	2	4	—N/a	—N/a	—N/a
Moradabad	Bijnor	8	4	4	—N/a	—N/a	—N/a
Moradabad	Moradabad	6	1	5	—N/a	—N/a	—N/a
Moradabad	Sambhal	4	1	3	—N/a	—N/a	—N/a
Moradabad	Rampur	5	2	3	—N/a	—N/a	—N/a
Moradabad	Amroha	4	2	2	—N/a	—N/a	—N/a
Meerut	Meerut	7	3	4	—N/a	—N/a	—N/a
Meerut	Baghpat	3	2	1	—N/a	—N/a	—N/a
Meerut	Ghaziabad	5	5	—N/a	—N/a	—N/a	—N/a
Meerut	Hapur	3	3	—N/a	—N/a	—N/a	—N/a
Meerut	G. B. Nagar	3	3	—N/a	—N/a	—N/a	—N/a
Meerut	Bulandshahr	7	7	—N/a	—N/a	—N/a	—N/a
Aligarh	Aligarh	7	7	—N/a	—N/a	—N/a	—N/a
Aligarh	Kasganj	3	2	1	—N/a	—N/a	—N/a
Aligarh	Etah	4	4	—N/a	—N/a	—N/a	—N/a
Aligarh	Hathras	3	2	1	—N/a	—N/a	—N/a
Agra	Mathura	5	5	—N/a	—N/a	—N/a	—N/a
Agra	Agra	9	9	—N/a	—N/a	—N/a	—N/a
Agra	Firozabad	5	2	3	—N/a	—N/a	—N/a
Agra	Mainpuri	4	2	2	—N/a	—N/a	—N/a
Bareilly	Budaun	6	3	3	—N/a	—N/a	—N/a
Bareilly	Bareilly	9	7	2	—N/a	—N/a	—N/a
Bareilly	Pilibhit	4	4	—N/a	—N/a	—N/a	—N/a
Bareilly	Shahjahanpur	6	6	—N/a	—N/a	—N/a	—N/a
Lucknow	Lakhimpur Kheri	8	8	—N/a	—N/a	—N/a	—N/a
Lucknow	Sitapur	9	8	1	—N/a	—N/a	—N/a
Lucknow	Hardoi	8	8	—N/a	—N/a	—N/a	—N/a
Lucknow	Unnao	6	6	—N/a	—N/a	—N/a	—N/a
Lucknow	Lucknow	9	7	2	—N/a	—N/a	—N/a
Lucknow	Raebareli	6	2	4	—N/a	—N/a	—N/a
Ayodhya	Amethi	4	2	2	—N/a	—N/a	—N/a
Ayodhya	Sultanpur	5	4	1	—N/a	—N/a	—N/a
Ayodhya	Barabanki	6	3	3	—N/a	—N/a	—N/a
Ayodhya	Ayodhya	5	3	2	—N/a	—N/a	—N/a
Ayodhya	Ambedkar Nagar	5	—N/a	5	—N/a	—N/a	—N/a
Kanpur	Farrukhabad	4	4	—N/a	—N/a	—N/a	—N/a
Kanpur	Kannauj	3	3	—N/a	—N/a	—N/a	—N/a
Kanpur	Etawah	3	1	2	—N/a	—N/a	—N/a
Kanpur	Auraiya	3	1	2	—N/a	—N/a	—N/a
Kanpur	Kanpur Dehat	4	4	—N/a	—N/a	—N/a	—N/a
Kanpur	Kanpur Nagar	10	7	3	—N/a	—N/a	—N/a
Jhansi	Jalaun	3	2	1	—N/a	—N/a	—N/a
Jhansi	Jhansi	4	4	—N/a	—N/a	—N/a	—N/a
Jhansi	Lalitpur	2	2	—N/a	—N/a	—N/a	—N/a
Chitrakoot	Hamirpur	2	2	—N/a	—N/a	—N/a	—N/a
Chitrakoot	Mahoba	2	2	—N/a	—N/a	—N/a	—N/a
Chitrakoot	Banda	4	3	1	—N/a	—N/a	—N/a
Chitrakoot	Chitrakoot	2	1	1	—N/a	—N/a	—N/a
Prayagraj	Fatehpur	6	4	2	—N/a	—N/a	—N/a
Prayagraj	Pratapgarh	7	2	2	1	—N/a	2
Prayagraj	Kaushambi	3	—N/a	3	—N/a	—N/a	—N/a
Prayagraj	Prayagraj	12	8	4	—N/a	—N/a	—N/a
Devipatan	Bahraich	7	5	2	—N/a	—N/a	—N/a
Devipatan	Shrawasti	2	1	1	—N/a	—N/a	—N/a
Devipatan	Balrampur	4	3	1	—N/a	—N/a	—N/a
Devipatan	Gonda	7	7	—N/a	—N/a	—N/a	—N/a
Basti	Siddharthnagar	5	3	2	—N/a	—N/a	—N/a
Basti	Basti	5	1	4	—N/a	—N/a	—N/a
Basti	Sant Kabir Nagar	3	3	—N/a	—N/a	—N/a	—N/a
Gorakhpur	Maharajganj	5	4	—N/a	1	—N/a	—N/a
Gorakhpur	Gorakhpur	9	9	—N/a	—N/a	—N/a	—N/a
Gorakhpur	Kushinagar	7	7	—N/a	—N/a	—N/a	—N/a
Gorakhpur	Deoria	7	7	—N/a	—N/a	—N/a	—N/a
Azamgarh	Azamgarh	10	—N/a	10	—N/a	—N/a	—N/a
Azamgarh	Mau	4	1	3	—N/a	—N/a	—N/a
Azamgarh	Ballia	7	2	4	—N/a	1	—N/a
Varanasi	Jaunpur	9	4	5	—N/a	—N/a	—N/a
Varanasi	Ghazipur	7	—N/a	7	—N/a	—N/a	—N/a
Varanasi	Chandauli	4	3	1	—N/a	—N/a	—N/a
Varanasi	Varanasi	8	8	—N/a	—N/a	—N/a	—N/a
Mirzapur	Bhadohi	3	2	1	—N/a	—N/a	—N/a
Mirzapur	Mirzapur	5	5	—N/a	—N/a	—N/a	—N/a
Mirzapur	Sonbhadra	4	4	—N/a	—N/a	—N/a	—N/a
Total		403	273	125	2	1	2

=== Results by polling phase ===
Division	Seats					
Division	Seats	NDA	SP+	UPA	BSP	OTH
I	58	46	12	—N/a	—N/a	—N/a
II	55	32	23	—N/a	—N/a	—N/a
III	59	44	15	—N/a	—N/a	—N/a
IV	59	49	10	—N/a	—N/a	—N/a
V	61	36	22	1	—N/a	2
VI	57	39	16	1	1	—N/a
VII	54	27	27	—N/a	—N/a	—N/a
Total	403	273	125	2	1	2

=== Results by constituency ===
District	Constituency		Turnout	Winner				Runner-up				Margin
District	#	Name	%	Candidate	Party	Votes	%	Candidate	Party	Votes	%	Margin
Saharanpur	1	Behat	75.58	Umar Ali Khan	SP	1,34,513	47.81	Naresh Saini	BJP	96,633	34.34	37,880
Saharanpur	2	Nakur	76.10	Mukesh Choudhary	BJP	1,04,114	38.47	Dharam Singh Saini	SP	1,03,799	38.35	315
Saharanpur	3	Saharanpur Nagar	66.08	Rajiv Gumber	BJP	1,43,195	48.85	Sanjay Garg	SP	1,35,761	46.32	7,434
Saharanpur	4	Saharanpur	72.27	Ashu Malik	SP	1,07,007	41.18	Jagpal Singh	BJP	76,262	29.35	30,745
Saharanpur	5	Deoband	69.10	Th. Brijesh Singh	BJP	93,890	38.77	Kartikeya Rana	SP	86,786	35.83	7,104
Saharanpur	6	Rampur Maniharan (SC)	71.71	Devendra Kumar Nim	BJP	89,109	38.37	Ravinder Kumar Molhu	BSP	68,516	29.50	20,593
Saharanpur	7	Gangoh	70.07	Kirat Singh	BJP	1,16,582	43.08	Inder Sain	SP	93,133	34.42	23,449
Shamli	8	Kairana	75.04	Nahid Hasan	SP	1,31,035	54.16	Mriganka Singh	BJP	1,05,148	43.46	25,887
Shamli	9	Thana Bhawan	66.87	Ashraf Ali Khan	RLD	1,03,751	47.47	Suresh Rana	BJP	92,945	42.53	10,806
Shamli	10	Shamli	67.62	Persann Kumar Chaudhary	RLD	1,03,070	48.86	Tejendra Nirwal	BJP	95,963	45.49	7,107
Muzaffarnagar	11	Budhana	67.09	Rajpal Singh Baliyan	RLD	1,31,093	51.28	Umesh Malik	BJP	1,02,783	40.21	28,310
Muzaffarnagar	12	Charthawal	67.68	Pankaj Kumar Malik	SP	97,363	43.82	Sapna Kashyap	BJP	92,029	41.42	5,334
Muzaffarnagar	13	Purqazi (SC)	65.85	Anil Kumar	RLD	92,672	43.09	Pramod Utwal	BJP	86,140	40.05	6,532
Muzaffarnagar	14	Muzaffarnagar	62.89	Kapil Dev Aggarwal	BJP	1,11,794	49.57	Saurabh Swaroop	RLD	93,100	41.28	18,694
Muzaffarnagar	15	Khatauli	69.79	Vikram Singh Saini	BJP	1,00,651	45.34	Rajpal Singh Saini	RLD	84,306	37.98	16,345
Muzaffarnagar	16	Meerapur	68.88	Chandan Chauhan	RLD	1,07,421	49.57	Prashant Chaudhary	BJP	80,041	36.94	27,380
Bijnor	17	Najibabad	67.10	Tasleem Ahmad	SP	1,02,675	44.14	Kunwar Bharatendu Singh	BJP	78,905	33.92	23,770
Bijnor	18	Nagina (SC)	64.36	Manoj Kumar Paras	SP	97,155	43.51	Dr. Yashwant	BJP	70,704	31.67	26,451
Bijnor	19	Barhapur	67.05	Kunwar Sushant Singh	BJP	1,00,100	41.58	Kapil Kumar	SP	85,755	35.62	14,345
Bijnor	20	Dhampur	67.82	Ashok Kumar Rana	BJP	81,791	39.89	Naeemul Hasan	SP	81,588	39.79	203
Bijnor	21	Nehtaur (SC)	65.82	Om Kumar	BJP	77,935	38.98	Munshi Ram	RLD	77,677	38.86	258
Bijnor	22	Bijnor	64.52	Suchi Chaudhary	BJP	97,165	38.54	Neeraj Chaudhary	RLD	95,720	37.96	1,445
Bijnor	23	Chandpur	68.86	Swami Omvesh	SP	90,522	40.34	Kamlesh Saini	BJP	90,288	40.24	234
Bijnor	24	Noorpur	65.94	Ram Avatar Singh	SP	92,574	43.27	Chandra Prakash Singh	BJP	86,509	40.43	6,065
Moradabad	25	Kanth	70.11	Kamal Akhtar	SP	1,34,692	49.19	Rajesh Kumar Singh	BJP	91,514	33.42	43,178
Moradabad	26	Thakurdwara	73.99	Nawab Jan	SP	1,34,391	48.76	Ajay Pratap Singh	BJP	1,14,706	41.62	19,684
Moradabad	27	Moradabad Rural	64.65	Mohd Nasir Qureshi	SP	1,14,337	56.88	Krishnakant Mishra	BJP	86,517	34.34	27,820
Moradabad	28	Moradabad Nagar	60.79	Ritesh Kumar Gupta	BJP	1,48,384	46.12	Mohd Yusuf Ansari	SP	1,47,602	45.88	782
Moradabad	29	Kundarki	71.40	Zia ur Rahman Barq	SP	1,25,792	46.28	Kamal Prajapati	BJP	82,630	30.40	43,162
Moradabad	30	Bilari	66.49	Mohammed Faeem	SP	95,338	39.92	Parmeshwar Lal Saini	BJP	87,728	36.73	7,610
Sambhal	31	Chandausi (SC)	59.45	Gulabo Devi	BJP	1,12,890	49.53	Vimlesh Kumar	SP	77,523	34.01	35,367
Sambhal	32	Asmoli	68.48	Pinki Singh Yadav	SP	1,11,652	42.92	Harendra Kumar	BJP	86,446	33.23	25,206
Sambhal	33	Sambhal	64.47	Iqbal Mehmood	SP	1,07,073	43.73	Rajesh Singhal	BJP	65,376	26.70	41,697
Rampur	34	Suar	69.34	Abdullah Azam Khan	SP	1,26,162	59.19	Haidar Ali Khan	AD(S)	65,059	30.62	61,103
Rampur	35	Chamraua	65.13	Naseer Ahmad Khan	SP	100,976	50.34	Mohan Kumar Lodhi	BJP	66,686	33.24	34,290
Rampur	36	Bilaspur	68.34	Baldev Singh Aulakh	BJP	101,998	43.17	Amarjit Singh	SP	101,691	43.04	307
Rampur	37	Rampur	56.61	Azam Khan	SP	131,225	59.71	Akash Saxena	BJP	76,084	34.62	55,141
Rampur	38	Milak (SC)	63.57	Rajbala	BJP	97,948	43.11	Vijay Singh	SP	92,036	40.50	5,912
Amroha	39	Dhanaura (SC)	70.34	Rajeev Tarara	BJP	1,03,054	42.29	Vivek Singh	SP	91,629	37.60	11,425
Amroha	40	Naugawan Sadat	74.49	Samarpal Singh	SP	1,08,497	44.38	Devender Nagpal	BJP	1,01,957	41.64	6,540
Amroha	41	Amroha	71.44	Mehboob Ali	SP	1,28,735	57.43	Ram Singh	BJP	57,699	25.74	71,036
Amroha	42	Hasanpur	73.84	Mahender Khadakvanshi	BJP	1,20,135	44.67	Mukhya Gurjar	SP	97,753	36.35	22,382
Meerut	43	Siwalkhas	68.78	Ghulam Mohammed	RLD	1,01,749	43.52	Maninder Pal	BJP	92,567	39.61	9,182
Meerut	44	Sardhana	67.22	Atul Pradhan	SP	1,18,573	48.75	Sangeet Som	BJP	1,00,373	41.27	18,200
Meerut	45	Hastinapur (SC)	66.84	Dinesh Khatik	BJP	1,07,587	46.72	Yogesh Verma	SP	1,00,275	43.55	7,312
Meerut	46	Kithore	69.85	Shahid Manzoor	SP	1,07,104	42.19	Satyavir Tyagi	BJP	1,04,924	41.33	2,180
Meerut	47	Meerut Cantt	56.84	Amit Agrawal	BJP	1,62,032	66.27	Manisha Ahlawat	RLD	43,960	17.98	1,18,072
Meerut	48	Meerut	64.55	Rafiq Ansari	SP	1,06,395	52.77	Kamal Dutt Sharma	BJP	80,330	39.84	26,065
Meerut	49	Meerut South	61.99	Somendra Tomar	BJP	1,29,667	43.46	Md Adil	SP	1,21,725	40.79	7,942
Baghpat	50	Chhaprauli	62.28	Ajay Kumar	RLD	1,11,880	53.30	Sahender Singh	BJP	82,372	39.24	29,508
Baghpat	51	Baraut	64.51	Krishnapal Malik	BJP	90,931	46.34	Ch. Jaiveer Singh Tomar	RLD	90,616	46.18	315
Baghpat	52	Baghpat	67.70	Chaudhary Yogesh Dhama	BJP	1,01,420	47.37	Mohd Ahmed Hameed	RLD	94,687	44.22	6,733
Ghaziabad	53	Loni	61.41	Nand Kishor Gurjar	BJP	1,27,410	40.44	Madan Bhaiya	RLD	1,18,734	37.68	8,676
Ghaziabad	54	Muradnagar	60.01	Ajit Pal Tyagi	BJP	1,69,290	61.63	Surendra Kumar	RLD	72,195	26.28	97,295
Ghaziabad	55	Sahibabad	47.18	Sunil Kumar Sharma	BJP	3,22,882	67.03	Amarpal Sharma	SP	1,08,047	22.43	2,14,835
Ghaziabad	56	Ghaziabad	51.75	Atul Garg	BJP	1,50,205	61.37	Vishal Verma	SP	44,668	18.25	1,05,537
Ghaziabad	57	Modinagar	67.36	Manju Shiwach	BJP	1,13,349	50.63	Sudesh Sharma	RLD	78,730	35.17	34,619
Hapur	58	Dhaulana	67.77	Dharmesh Singh Tomar	BJP	1,25,028	44.65	Aslam Ali	SP	1,12,400	40.14	12,628
Hapur	59	Hapur (SC)	66.92	Vijay Pal Aadthi	BJP	97,862	39.69	Gajraj Singh	RLD	90,828	36.84	7,034
Hapur	60	Garhmukteshwar	67.72	Harendra Singh Tewatia	BJP	1,04,113	44.07	Ravindra Chaudhary	SP	77,807	32.94	26,306
Gautam Buddha Nagar	61	Noida	48.77	Pankaj Singh	BJP	2,44,319	70.16	Sunil Choudhary	SP	62,806	18.04	1,81,513
Gautam Buddha Nagar	62	Dadri	58.35	Tejpal Singh Nagar	BJP	2,18,068	61.64	Rajkumar Bhati	SP	79,850	22.57	1,38,218
Gautam Buddha Nagar	63	Jewar	65.87	Dhirendra Singh	BJP	1,17,205	50.53	Avtar Singh Bhadana	RLD	60,890	26.25	56,315
Bulandshahr	64	Sikandrabad	67.33	Lakshmi Raj Singh	BJP	1,25,644	46.00	Rahul Yadav	SP	96,301	35.26	29,343
Bulandshahr	65	Bulandshahr	64.95	Pradeep Kumar Chaudhary	BJP	1,27,026	48.94	Haji Yunus	RLD	1,01,426	38.99	25,600
Bulandshahr	66	Syana	65.37	Devendra Singh Lodhi	BJP	1,49,125	58.90	Dilnawaj Khan	RLD	59,468	23.49	89,657
Bulandshahr	67	Anupshahr	62.87	Sanjay Kumar Sharma	BJP	1,25,602	52.64	Rameshwar Lodhi	BSP	47,979	20.11	77,623
Bulandshahr	68	Debai	63.02	Chandrapal Singh	BJP	1,28,640	58.60	Harish Kumar	SP	60,615	27.61	68,025
Bulandshahr	69	Shikarpur	64.18	Anil Sharma	BJP	1,13,855	53.04	Kiran Pal Singh	RLD	58,172	27.10	55,683
Bulandshahr	70	Khurja (SC)	66.64	Meenakshi Singh	BJP	1,37,461	52.99	Banshi Singh	SP	70,377	27.13	67,084
Aligarh	71	Khair (SC)	61.70	Anoop Pradhan	BJP	1,39,643	55.55	Charu Kain	BSP	65,302	25.98	74,341
Aligarh	72	Barauli	64.28	Thakur Jaivir Singh	BJP	1,47,984	60.57	Narendra Kumar Sharma	BSP	57,339	23.47	90,645
Aligarh	73	Atrauli	60.02	Sandeep Kumar Singh	BJP	1,25,691	52.03	Viresh Yadav	SP	86,367	35.75	39,324
Aligarh	74	Chharra	62.79	Ravendra Pal Singh	BJP	1,10,928	45.79	Laxmi Dhangar	SP	86,966	35.78	24,327
Aligarh	75	Koil	62.34	Anil Parashar	BJP	1,08,067	42.81	Shaaz Ishaaq	SP	1,03,039	40.82	5,028
Aligarh	76	Aligarh	63.89	Mukta Raja	BJP	1,20,389	47.66	Zafar Alam	SP	1,07,603	42.60	12,786
Aligarh	77	Iglas (SC)	61.25	Rajkumar Sahyogi	BJP	1,27,209	52.35	Birpal Diwakar	RLD	68,046	28.00	59,163
Hathras	78	Hathras (SC)	63.20	Anjula Singh Mahaur	BJP	1,54,655	58.79	Sanjeev Kumar	BSP	53,799	20.45	1,00,856
Hathras	79	Sadabad	64.32	Pradeep Kumar Singh	RLD	1,04,874	43.25	Ramveer Upadhyay	BJP	98,437	40.60	6,437
Hathras	80	Sikandra Rao	62.39	Birendra Singh Rana	BJP	98,094	41.63	Lalit Pratap Baghel	SP	89,990	38.19	8,104
Mathura	81	Chhata	65.34	Ch. Laxmi Narayan Singh	BJP	1,24,414	52.18	Tejpal Singh	RLD	75,466	31.65	48,948
Mathura	82	Mant	64.89	Rajesh Chaudhary	BJP	83,958	37.35	Shyam Sundar Sharma	BSP	74,378	33.09	9,580
Mathura	83	Goverdhan	66.31	Karinda Singh	BJP	1,00,199	45.21	Rajkumar Rawat	BSP	57,692	26.03	42,507
Mathura	84	Mathura	57.39	Shrikant Sharma	BJP	1,58,859	60.26	Pradeep Mathur	INC	49,056	18.61	1,09,803
Mathura	85	Baldev (SC)	65.15	Pooran Prakash	BJP	1,08,414	44.14	Babita Devi	RLD	83,159	33.86	25,255
Agra	86	Etmadpur	67.57	Dharampal Singh	BJP	1,46,603	48.77	Praval Pratap Singh	BSP	98,679	32.83	47,924
Agra	87	Agra Cantonment (SC)	53.90	G S Dharmesh	BJP	1,17,796	46.78	Kunwar Chand	SP	69,099	27.44	48,697
Agra	88	Agra South	56.75	Yogendra Upadhyaya	BJP	1,09,262	52.39	Vinay Agarwal	SP	52,622	25.23	56,640
Agra	89	Agra North	55.27	Purushottam Khandelwal	BJP	1,53,817	63.89	Shabbir Abbas	BSP	41,447	17.22	1,12,370
Agra	90	Agra Rural (SC)	60.98	Baby Rani Maurya	BJP	1,37,310	52.63	Kiran Prabha Keshari	BSP	60,702	23.26	76,608
Agra	91	Fatehpur Sikri	67.67	Babulal Chaudhary	BJP	1,12,095	46.14	Brijesh Chahar	RLD	64,826	26.69	47,269
Agra	92	Kheragarh	62.45	Bhagwan Singh Kushwaha	BJP	96,574	47.05	Ramnath Shikarwar	INC	60,077	29.27	36,497
Agra	93	Fatehabad	66.86	Chotelal Verma	BJP	1,08,811	50.46	Rupali Dixit	SP	55,576	25.77	53,235
Agra	94	Bah	56.91	Rani Pakshalika Singh	BJP	78,360	41.16	Madhusudan Sharma	SP	54,125	28.43	24,235
Firozabad	95	Tundla (SC)	66.65	Prempal Singh Dhangar	BJP	1,22,881	49.46	Rakesh Babu	SP	75,190	30.26	47,691
Firozabad	96	Jasrana	67.46	Sachin Yadav	SP	1,08,289	43.71	Manvendra Lodhi	BJP	1,07,453	43.37	836
Firozabad	97	Firozabad	58.91	Manish Asiza	BJP	1,12,509	43.43	Saifur Rehman	SP	79,554	30.71	32,955
Firozabad	98	Shikohabad	65.81	Mukesh Verma	SP	1,06,279	45.14	Omprakash Verma	BJP	96,951	41.18	9,328
Firozabad	99	Sirsaganj	64.80	Sarvesh Singh Yadav	SP	96,224	46.22	Hariom Yadav	BJP	87,419	41.99	8,805
Kasganj	100	Kasganj	64.37	Devendra Singh	BJP	1,23,410	52.67	Man Pal Singh	SP	77,145	32.92	46,265
Kasganj	101	Amanpur	61.52	Hariom Verma	BJP	96,377	50.40	Satybhan Shakya	SP	53,048	27.74	43,329
Kasganj	102	Patiyali	61.11	Nadira Sultan	SP	91,545	41.88	Mamtesh Shakya	BJP	87,957	40.06	4,001
Etah	103	Aliganj	66.15	Satyapal Singh Rathore	BJP	1,02,873	45.44	Rameshwar Singh Yadav	SP	99,063	43.76	3,810
Etah	104	Etah	62.35	Vipin Kumar David	BJP	97,539	46.34	Jugendra Singh Yadav	SP	80,292	38.15	17,247
Etah	105	Marhara	66.76	Virendra Singh Lodhi	BJP	1,01,387	49.01	Amit Gaurav	SP	83,778	40.50	17,609
Etah	106	Jalesar	68.09	Sanjeev Kumar Diwakar	BJP	91,339	45.10	Ranjeet Suman	SP	86,898	42.91	4,441
Mainpuri	107	Mainpuri	61.85	Jaiveer Singh	BJP	99,814	46.73	Raj Kumar	SP	93,048	43.56	6,766
Mainpuri	108	Bhongaon	62.62	Ram Naresh Agnihotri	BJP	97,208	45.18	Alok Shakya	SP	92,441	42.97	4,767
Mainpuri	109	Kishni (SC)	62.98	Brajesh Katheriya	SP	97,070	49.58	Priya Ranjan Ashu Diwakar	BJP	77,919	39.80	19,151
Mainpuri	110	Karhal	66.02	Akhilesh Yadav	SP	1,48,196	60.12	S.P. Singh Baghel	BJP	80,692	32.74	67,504
Sambhal	111	Gunnaur	58.68	Ramkhiladi Singh Yadav	SP	1,23,969	51.38	Ajeet Kumar Yadav	BJP	94,440	39.14	29,529
Budaun	112	Bisauli (SC)	59.34	Ashutosh Maurya	SP	1,10,569	44.23	Kushagra Sagar	BJP	1,08,735	43.50	1,834
Budaun	113	Sahaswan	58.86	Brajesh Yadav	SP	83,673	33.35	Haji Vittan Musarrat	BSP	69,728	27.79	13,945
Budaun	114	Bilsi	57.80	Harish Chandra Shakya	BJP	93,500	45.54	Chandra Prakash Maurya	SP	68,385	33.31	25,115
Budaun	115	Badaun	58.28	Mahesh Chandra Gupta	BJP	1,01,096	46.12	Raish Ahmed	SP	89,917	41.02	11,179
Budaun	116	Shekhupur	61.08	Himanshu Yadav	SP	1,05,531	42.84	Dharmendra Shakya	BJP	99,431	40.36	6,100
Budaun	117	Dataganj	58.29	Rajeev Kumar Singh	BJP	1,07,591	45.34	Arjun Singh	SP	98,115	41.35	9,476
Bareilly	118	Baheri	72.59	Ataur Rehman	SP	1,24,145	46.67	Chhatrapal Singh Gangwar	BJP	1,20,790	45.41	3,355
Bareilly	119	Meerganj	67.25	DC Verma	BJP	116,435	50.98	Sultan Baig	SP	83,955	36.76	32,840
Bareilly	120	Bhojipura	68.83	Shazil Islam Ansari	SP	119,402	45.88	Bahoran Lal Maurya	BJP	109,993	42.26	9,409
Bareilly	121	Nawabganj	67.89	Dr. M. P. Arya Gangwar	BJP	111,113	48.20	Bhagwat Saran Gangwar	SP	101,876	44.20	9,237
Bareilly	122	Faridpur (SC)	62.00	Shyam Bihari Lal	BJP	92,070	45.22	Vijay Pal Singh	SP	89,149	43.78	2,921
Bareilly	123	Bithari Chainpur	62.92	Raghavendra Sharma	BJP	115,417	46.53	Agam Maurya	SP	99,576	40.15	15,841
Bareilly	124	Bareilly	52.43	Dr. Arun Kumar Saxena	BJP	129,014	53.77	Rajesh Aggarwal	SP	96,694	40.30	32,320
Bareilly	125	Bareilly Cantt	51.79	Sanjeev Agarwal	BJP	98,931	50.43	Supriya Aron	SP	88,163	44.94	10,768
Bareilly	126	Aonla	60.79	Dharampal Singh	BJP	88,956	46.45	Radha Krishan Sharma	SP	70,532	36.83	18,424
Pilibhit	127	Pilibhit	68.89	Sanjay Singh Gangwar	BJP	1,25,506	48.08	Shailendra Gangwar	SP	1,18,536	45.41	6,970
Pilibhit	128	Barkhera	73.46	Swami Pravaktanand	BJP	1,51,771	63.80	Hemraj Verma	SP	70,299	29.55	81,472
Pilibhit	129	Puranpur (SC)	69.64	Babu Ram Paswan	BJP	1,34,404	50.12	Ms Arti	SP	107,828	40.21	26,576
Pilibhit	130	Bisalpur	66.40	Vivek Kumar Verma	BJP	1,21,142	50.55	Divya Gangwar	SP	70,733	29.52	50,409
Shahjahanpur	131	Katra	57.55	Veer Vikram Singh	BJP	77,800	39.90	Rajesh Yadav	SP	77,443	39.72	357
Shahjahanpur	132	Jalalabad	59.04	Hari Prakash Verma	BJP	99,609	45.97	Niraj Nilinesh	SP	95,037	43.86	4,572
Shahjahanpur	133	Tilhar	59.99	Salona Kushwaha	BJP	1,02,307	47.93	Roshan Lal Verma	SP	89,030	41.71	13,277
Shahjahanpur	134	Powayan (SC)	60.31	Chetram Pasi	BJP	1,29,785	55.62	Upendra Pal Singh	SP	78,207	33.62	51,578
Shahjahanpur	135	Shahjahanpur	54.57	Suresh Kumar Khanna	BJP	1,09,942	48.98	Tanveer Khan	SP	1,00,629	44.83	9,313
Shahjahanpur	136	Dadraul	62.96	Manvendra Singh	BJP	1,00,957	45.06	Rajesh Kumar Verma	SP	91,256	40.73	9,701
Lakhimpur Kheri	137	Palia	65.58	Harvindar Kumar Sahani	BJP	1,18,864	50.20	Pritinder Singh Kakku	SP	80,735	34.10	38,129
Lakhimpur Kheri	138	Nighasan	69.57	Shashank Verma	BJP	1,26,488	53.41	R S Kushwaha	SP	85,479	36.10	41,009
Lakhimpur Kheri	139	Gola Gokrannath	65.62	Arvind Giri	BJP	1,26,534	48.67	Vinay Tiwari	SP	97,240	37.40	29,294
Lakhimpur Kheri	140	Sri Nagar (SC)	71.81	Manju Tyagi	BJP	1,08,249	47.21	Ram Sharan	SP	90,641	39.53	17,608
Lakhimpur Kheri	141	Dhaurahra	69.04	Vinod Shankar Awasthi	BJP	1,13,498	49.49	Varun Singh	SP	88,888	38.76	24,610
Lakhimpur Kheri	142	Lakhimpur	65.44	Yogesh Verma	BJP	1,27,663	47.38	Utkarsh Verma Madhur	SP	1,07,085	39.74	20,578
Lakhimpur Kheri	143	Kasta (SC)	69.60	Saurabh Singh	BJP	1,03,315	47.93	Sunil Kumar Lala	SP	89,498	41.52	13,817
Lakhimpur Kheri	144	Mohammdi	68.63	Lokendra Pratap Singh	BJP	99,377	42.75	Daud Ahmad	SP	94,506	40.66	4,871
Sitapur	145	Maholi	66.11	Shashank Trivedi	BJP	1,12,040	44.73	Anoop Kumar Gupta	SP	99,868	39.87	12,172
Sitapur	146	Sitapur	58.24	Rakesh Rathour	BJP	99,349	42.72	Radhe Shyam Jaiswal	SP	98,096	42.18	1,253
Sitapur	147	Hargaon (SC)	68.07	Suresh Rahi	BJP	1,16,691	52.46	Ramhet Bharti	SP	78,531	35.31	38,160
Sitapur	148	Laharpur	66.74	Anil Kumar Verma	SP	1,12,987	47.05	Suneel Verma	BJP	99,832	41.57	13,155
Sitapur	149	Biswan	70.10	Nirmal Verma	BJP	1,06,014	44.77	Afzaal Kausar	SP	95,536	40.35	10,478
Sitapur	150	Sevata	71.04	Gyan Tiwari	BJP	1,08,057	47.43	Mahendra Kumar Singh	SP	87,619	39.34	20,438
Sitapur	151	Mahmoodabad	69.66	Asha Maurya	BJP	92,091	41.91	Narendra Singh Verma	SP	86,869	39.51	5,222
Sitapur	152	Sidhauli (SC)	68.62	Manish Rawat	BJP	1,06,222	43.58	Dr. Hargovind Bhargawa	SP	96,506	39.60	9,716
Sitapur	153	Misrikh (SC)	61.52	Ramkrishna Bhargava	BJP	91,092	41.15	Manoj Kumar Raghuvanshi	SBSP	79,627	35.97	11,465
Hardoi	154	Sawayazpur	61.54	Madhavendra Pratap	BJP	1,14,623	46.03	Padamrag Singh Yadav	SP	88,576	35.68	26,047
Hardoi	155	Shahabad	65.76	Rajani Tiwari	BJP	94,561	40.49	Asif Khan Babbu	SP	88,082	37.72	6,479
Hardoi	156	Hardoi	57.52	Nitin Agarwal	BJP	1,26,750	53.19	Anil Verma	SP	84,339	35.39	42,411
Hardoi	157	Gopamau (SC)	61.99	Shyam Prakash	BJP	91,762	43.07	Rajeshwari	SP	83,764	39.32	7,998
Hardoi	158	Sandi (SC)	58.89	Prabhash Kumar	BJP	81,519	41.70	Usha Verma	SP	72,286	36.97	9,233
Hardoi	159	Bilgram-Mallanwan	61.47	Ashish Kumar Singh	BJP	82,075	34.96	Brijesh Kumar Verma	SP	57,185	24.36	24,890
Hardoi	160	Balamau (SC)	55.12	Ram Pal Verma	BJP	81,994	42.84	Rambali Verma	SP	55,570	29.13	26,424
Hardoi	161	Sandila	59.92	Alka Singh Arkvanshi	BJP	1,01,730	49.76	Abdul Mannan	BSP	64,627	31.61	37,103
Unnao	162	Bangarmau	56.94	Shrikant Katiyar	BJP	90,980	44.70	Dr. Munna	SP	75,187	36.94	15,793
Unnao	163	Safipur (SC)	57.05	Bamba Lal Diwakar	BJP	1,02,968	52.13	Sudhir Kumar	SP	68,836	34.85	34,132
Unnao	164	Mohan (SC)	61.82	Brijesh Kumar Rawat	BJP	1,13,291	53.45	Dr. Anchal	SP	70,112	33.08	43,179
Unnao	165	Unnao	59.96	Pankaj Gupta	BJP	126,670	51.62	Abhinav Kumar	SP	95,542	38.94	31,128
Unnao	166	Bhagwantnagar	59.31	Ashutosh Shukla	BJP	127,118	51.28	Ankit Parihar	SP	84,108	33.93	43,010
Unnao	167	Purwa	61.62	Anil Kumar Singh	BJP	133,827	52.27	Uday Raj	SP	1,02,766	40.14	31,061
Lucknow	168	Malihabad (SC)	66.68	Jai Devi	BJP	1,06,372	44.15	Surendra Kumar	SP	98,627	40.93	7,745
Lucknow	169	Bakshi Kaa Talab	69.82	Yogesh Shukla	BJP	1,47,922	46.36	Gomti Yadav	SP	1,20,134	37.65	27,788
Lucknow	170	Sarojini Nagar	57.71	Rajeshwar Singh	BJP	1,60,626	49.07	Abhishek Mishra	SP	1,04,440	31.90	56,186
Lucknow	171	Lucknow West	58.29	Armaan Khan	SP	1,24,497	48.19	Anjali Kumar Srivastava	BJP	1,16,313	45.03	8,184
Lucknow	172	Lucknow North	56.29	Neeraj Bora	BJP	1,39,159	53.30	Pooja Shukla	SP	1,05,206	40.29	33,953
Lucknow	173	Lucknow East	56.27	Ashutosh Tandon	BJP	1,52,928	59.40	Anurag Bhadouria	SP	84,197	32.70	68,731
Lucknow	174	Lucknow Central	56.81	Ravidas Mehotra	SP	1,04,488	49.62	Rajnish Kumar Gupta	BJP	93,553	44.43	10,935
Lucknow	175	Lucknow Cantonment	53.70	Brajesh Pathak	BJP	1,08,147	54.70	Raju Gandhi	SP	68,635	34.71	39,512
Lucknow	176	Mohanlalganj (SC)	67.69	Amresh Kumar	BJP	1,07,089	43.58	Sushila Saroj	SP	90,541	36.84	16,548
Raebareli	177	Bachhrawan (SC)	62.17	Shyam Sunder Bharti	SP	65,747	31.38	Laxmikant	AD(S)	62,935	30.04	2,812
Amethi	178	Tiloi	58.31	Mayankeshwar Sharan Singh	BJP	99,472	48.54	Mohd Naim	SP	71,643	34.96	27,829
Raebareli	179	Harchandpur	63.09	Rahul Rajpoot	SP	92,498	45.87	Rakesh Singh	BJP	78,009	38.69	14,489
Raebareli	180	Rae Bareli	62.32	Aditi Singh	BJP	102,429	44.51	Ram Pratap Yadav	SP	95,254	41.40	7,175
Raebareli	181	Salon (SC)	57.35	Ashok Kori	BJP	87,715	43.79	Jagdish Prasad	SP	85,604	42.73	1,511
Raebareli	182	Sareni	58.34	Devendra Pratap Singh	SP	66,166	30.53	Dhirendra Bahadur Singh	BJP	62,359	28.78	3,807
Raebareli	183	Unchahar	62.54	Manoj Kumar Pandey	SP	82,514	38.92	Amarpal Maurya	BJP	75,893	35.79	6,621
Amethi	184	Jagdishpur (SC)	53.72	Suresh Kumar	BJP	89,315	43.94	Vijay Kumar	INC	66,491	32.71	22,824
Amethi	185	Gauriganj	57.94	Rakesh Pratap Singh	SP	79,040	38.96	Chandraprakash Mishra	BJP	72,077	35.53	6,963
Amethi	186	Amethi	54.27	Maharaji Prajapati	SP	88,217	46.46	Sanjaya Sinh	BJP	70,121	39.93	18,096
Sultanpur	187	Isauli	56.54	Mohammad Tahir Khan	SP	69,629	34.34	Om Prakash Pandey	BJP	69,360	34.21	269
Sultanpur	188	Sultanpur	57.68	Vinod Singh	BJP	92,715	42.24	Anoop Sanda	SP	91,706	41.78	1,009
Sultanpur	189	Sadar	59.10	Raj Prasad Upadhyay	BJP	85,249	41.89	Arun Verma	SP	69,495	34.15	15,754
Sultanpur	190	Lambhua	57.12	Sitaram Verma	BJP	82,999	39.37	Santosh Pandey	SP	73,466	34.85	9,533
Sultanpur	191	Kadipur (SC)	58.48	Rajesh Gautam	BJP	96,405	43.44	Bhagelu Ram	SP	70,682	31.85	25,723
Farrukhabad	192	Kaimganj	61.46	Dr. Surabhi Singh	AD(S)	1,14,952	47.65	Sarvesh Ambedkar	SP	96,409	39.97	18,543
Farrukhabad	193	Amritpur	59.16	Sushil Kumar Shakya	BJP	98,848	53.10	Dr. Jitendra Singh Yadav	SP	54,162	29.10	44,686
Farrukhabad	194	Farrukhabad	56.00	Sunil Dutt Dwivedi	BJP	1,12,314	53.83	Suman Shakya	SP	72,988	34.99	39,326
Farrukhabad	195	Bhojpur	61.66	Nagendra Singh Rathore	BJP	99,979	50.68	Arshad Jamal Siddiqui	SP	72,521	36.76	27,468
Kannauj	196	Chhibramau	60.76	Archana Pandey	BJP	124,773	44.31	Arvind Singh Yadav	SP	123,662	43.91	1,111
Kannauj	197	Tirwa	62.63	Kailash Singh Rajput	BJP	106,089	44.51	Anil Kumar Pal	SP	101,481	42.57	4,608
Kannauj	198	Kannauj (SC)	63.29	Asim Arun	BJP	120,876	44.53	Anil Kumar Dohare	SP	114,786	42.29	6,090
Etawah	199	Jaswantnagar	64.69	Shivpal Singh Yadav	SP	1,59,718	62.97	Vivek Shakya	BJP	68,739	27.10	90,979
Etawah	200	Etawah	60.40	Sarita Bhadauria	BJP	98,150	39.97	Sarvesh Kumar Shakya	SP	94,166	38.35	3,984
Etawah	201	Bharthana (SC)	60.53	Raghvendra Kumar Singh	SP	1,03,676	42.02	Siddharth Shanker	BJP	96,117	38.96	7,559
Auraiya	202	Bidhuna	62.61	Rekha Verma	SP	92,757	42.59	Riya Shakya	BJP	89,492	39.19	3,265
Auraiya	203	Dibiyapur	62.03	Pradeep Kumar Yadav	SP	80,865	40.34	Lakhan Singh Rajput	BJP	80,392	40.10	473
Auraiya	204	Auraiya (SC)	58.80	Gudiya Katheriya	BJP	88,631	45.28	Jitendra Kumar Dohare	SP	66,184	33.81	22,447
Kanpur Dehat	205	Rasulabad (SC)	60.63	Poonam Sankhwar	BJP	91,783	46.77	Kamlesh Chandra Diwakar	SP	70,271	35.80	21,512
Kanpur Dehat	206	Akbarpur-Raniya	64.73	Pratibha Shukla	BJP	92,827	43.82	Dr. Ram Prakash Kushwaha	SP	79,410	37.49	13,417
Kanpur Dehat	207	Sikandra	60.10	Ajit Singh Pal	BJP	89,461	44.89	Prabhakar Pandey	SP	57,894	29.05	31,567
Kanpur Dehat	208	Bhognipur	62.27	Rakesh Sachan	BJP	87,809	40.25	Narendra Pal Singh	SP	75,916	34.80	11,893
Kanpur Nagar	209	Bilhaur (SC)	62.23	Rahul Bachha Sonkar	BJP	123,094	50.34	Rachna Singh	SP	80,743	33.02	42,351
Kanpur Nagar	210	Bithoor	65.59	Abhijeet Singh Sanga	BJP	107,330	44.46	Munendra Shukla	SP	86,257	35.73	21,073
Kanpur Nagar	211	Kalyanpur	52.89	Neelima Katiyar	BJP	98,997	52.71	Satish Kumar Nigam	SP	77,462	41.24	21,535
Kanpur Nagar	212	Govindnagar	54.66	Surendra Maithani	BJP	117,501	61.03	Vikas Yadav	SP	36,605	19.05	80,896
Kanpur Nagar	213	Sishamau	56.83	Haji Irfan Solanki	SP	79,163	50.68	Salil Vishnoi	BJP	66,897	42.83	12,266
Kanpur Nagar	214	Arya Nagar	50.95	Amitabh Bajpai	SP	76,897	50.56	Suresh Awasthi	BJP	68,973	45.35	7,924
Kanpur Nagar	215	Kidwai Nagar	59.06	Mahesh Trivedi	BJP	1,14,111	55.39	Ajay Kapoor	INC	76,351	37.06	37,760
Kanpur Nagar	216	Kanpur Cantonment	52.37	Mohammed Hasan	SP	94,729	49.99	Raghunandan Singh Bhadauria	BJP	74,742	39.44	19,987
Kanpur Nagar	217	Maharajpur	56.25	Satish Mahana	BJP	1,52,883	60.60	Fateh Bahadur Singh Gill	SP	70,622	28.00	82,261
Kanpur Nagar	218	Ghatampur (SC)	60.55	Saroj Kureel	AD(S)	81,727	41.60	Bhagwati Prasad Sagar	SP	67,253	34.23	14,474
Jalaun	219	Madhogarh	57.21	Moolchandra Singh	BJP	1,05,231	41.29	Sheetal Kushwaha	BSP	70,257	27.57	34,974
Jalaun	220	Kalpi	59.99	Vinod Chaturvedi	SP	69,782	29.48	Chhote Singh	NISHAD	66,966	28.29	2,816
Jalaun	221	Orai (SC)	60.93	Gauri Shankar	BJP	1,28,644	47.45	Dayashankar Verma	SP	90,996	33.56	37,648
Jhansi	222	Babina	70.73	Rajeev Singh Parichha	BJP	1,18,343	50.44	Yashpal Singh Yadav	SP	73,814	31.46	44,529
Jhansi	223	Jhansi Nagar	59.88	Ravi Sharma	BJP	1,48,262	58.65	Sitaram Kushwaha	SP	71,909	28.45	76,353
Jhansi	224	Mauranipur (SC)	66.95	Rashmi Arya	AD(S)	1,43,577	51.83	Tilak Chandra Ahirwar	SP	84,982	30.68	58,595
Jhansi	225	Garautha	67.06	Jawahar Lal Rajput	BJP	1,14,059	48.34	Deep Narayan Singh	SP	80,397	34.07	33,662
Lalitpur	226	Lalitpur	68.27	Ramratan Kushwaha	BJP	1,76,550	52.99	Chandrabhusan Bundela	BSP	69,335	20.81	1,07,215
Lalitpur	227	Mehroni (SC)	74.86	Manohar Lal Panth	BJP	1,84,778	54.86	Kiran Ramesh Khatik	BSP	74,327	22.07	1,10,451
Hamirpur	228	Hamirpur	63.65	Manoj Kumar Prajapati	BJP	1,05,432	40.14	Ram Prakash Prajapati	SP	79,947	30.44	25,485
Hamirpur	229	Rath (SC)	64.84	Manisha Anuragi	BJP	1,39,373	53.79	Chandravati	SP	77,394	29.87	61,979
Mahoba	230	Mahoba	65.40	Rakesh Kumar Goswami	BJP	94,490	45.61	Manoj Tiwari	SP	51,043	24.64	43,447
Mahoba	231	Charkhari	64.39	Brijbhushan Rajpoot	BJP	1,02,051	45.75	Ramjeevan Yadav	SP	60,170	26.97	41,881
Banda	232	Tindwari	61.63	Ramakesh Nishad	BJP	86,812	44.24	Brijesh Prajapati	SP	58,387	29.76	28,425
Banda	233	Baberu	60.75	Vishambhar Singh Yadav	SP	79,614	38.75	Ajay Kumar	BJP	72,221	35.15	7,393
Banda	234	Naraini (SC)	62.50	Ommani Verma	BJP	83,263	38.91	Kiran Verma	SP	76,544	35.77	6,719
Banda	235	Banda	63.59	Prakash Dwivedi	BJP	81,557	41.34	Manjula Singh	SP	66,343	33.63	15,214
Chitrakoot	236	Chitrakoot	64.61	Anil Pradhan	SP	104,771	43.23	Chandrika Prasad Upadhyay	BJP	83,895	34.62	20,876
Chitrakoot	237	Manikpur	61.34	Avinash Chandra Dwivedi	AD(S)	73,132	35.17	Veer Singh Patel	SP	72,084	34.67	1,048
Fatehpur	238	Jahanabad	61.16	Rajendra Singh Patel	BJP	78,503	41.21	Madan Gopal Verma	SP	60,311	31.66	18,192
Fatehpur	239	Bindki	60.98	Jai Kumar Singh Jaiki	AD(S)	78,165	40.96	Rameshwar Dayal	SP	74,368	38.97	3,797
Fatehpur	240	Fatehpur	59.87	Chandra Prakash Lodhi	SP	96,839	45.24	Vikram Singh	BJP	88,238	41.22	8,601
Fatehpur	241	Ayah Shah	58.44	Vikas Gupta	BJP	71,231	44.40	Vishambhar Prasad Nishad	SP	58,225	36.30	13,006
Fatehpur	242	Husainganj	61.85	Usha Maurya	SP	91,884	48.78	Ranvendra Pratap Singh	BJP	66,703	35.41	25,181
Fatehpur	243	Khaga (SC)	58.34	Krishna Paswan	BJP	83,735	41.87	Ramthirth Paramhans	SP	78,226	39.12	5,509
Pratapgarh	244	Rampur Khas	52.30	Aradhana Misra Mona	INC	84,334	50.27	Nagesh Pratap Singh	BJP	69,593	41.49	14,741
Pratapgarh	245	Babaganj (SC)	52.18	Vinod Kumar	JD(L)	67,282	40.34	Girish Chandra	SP	51,515	30.80	15,767
Pratapgarh	246	Kunda	55.20	Raghuraj Pratap Singh	JD(L)	99,612	50.58	Gulshan Yadav	SP	69,297	35.19	30,315
Pratapgarh	247	Vishwanathganj	50.28	Jeet Lal Patel	AD(S)	86,829	43.21	Saurabh Singh	SP	38,777	19.30	48,052
Pratapgarh	248	Pratapgarh	55.18	Rajendra Maurya	BJP	89,762	45.80	Krishna Patel	AD(K)	64,699	33.01	25,063
Pratapgarh	249	Patti	60.52	Ram Singh Patel	SP	1,08,070	48.73	Rajendra Pratap Singh	BJP	86,019	38.79	22,051
Pratapgarh	250	Raniganj	56.15	Rakesh Kumar Verma	SP	75,583	40.05	Dhiraj Ojha	BJP	72,934	38.65	2,649
Kaushambi	251	Sirathu	59.90	Pallavi Patel	SP	106,278	46.49	Keshav Prasad Maurya	BJP	98,941	43.28	7,337
Kaushambi	252	Manjhanpur (SC)	61.77	Indrajit Saroj	SP	121,506	47.20	Lal Bahadur	BJP	97,628	37.93	23,878
Kaushambi	253	Chail	57.75	Pooja Pal	SP	88,818	39.65	Nagendra Pratap Singh	AD(S)	75,609	33.76	13,209
Prayagraj	254	Phaphamau	57.56	Guru Prasad Maurya	BJP	91,186	43.26	Ansar Ahmad	SP	76,862	36.47	14,324
Prayagraj	255	Soraon (SC)	58.68	Geeta Shastri	SP	91,474	40.99	Jamuna Prasad	AD(S)	85,884	38.48	5,590
Prayagraj	256	Phulpur	60.32	Praveen Patel	BJP	103,557	42.00	Mujataba Siddiqui	SP	100,825	40.89	2,732
Prayagraj	257	Pratappur	55.92	Vijama Yadav	SP	91,142	40.09	Rakesh Dhar Tripathi	AD(S)	80,186	35.27	10,956
Prayagraj	258	Handia	53.47	Hakim Lal Bind	SP	84,417	39.36	Prashant Kumar Singh Rahul	NISHAD	80,874	37.71	3,543
Prayagraj	259	Meja	57.22	Sandeep Singh Patel	SP	78,555	42.12	Neelam Karwariya	BJP	75,116	40.28	3,439
Prayagraj	260	Karachhana	58.06	Piyush Ranjan Nishad	BJP	89,527	44.06	Ujjwal Raman Singh	SP	80,199	39.47	9,328
Prayagraj	261	Allahabad West	48.49	Sidharth Nath Singh	BJP	1,18,759	53.29	Richa Singh	SP	88,826	39.86	29,933
Prayagraj	262	Allahabad North	39.77	Harshvardhan Bajpai	BJP	96,890	55.07	Sandeep Yadav	SP	42,007	23.88	54,883
Prayagraj	263	Allahabad South	44.27	Nand Gopal Gupta	BJP	97,864	54.14	Raish Chandra Shukla	SP	71,682	39.66	26,182
Prayagraj	264	Bara (SC)	61.25	Vachaspati	AD(S)	89,203	43.49	Ajay Munna	SP	76,679	37.38	12,464
Prayagraj	265	Koraon (SC)	59.04	Rajmani Kol	BJP	84,587	40.74	Ram Deo	SP	60,100	28.95	24,487
Barabanki	266	Kursi	73.03	Sakendra Pratap Verma	BJP	1,18,720	41.15	Rakesh Verma	SP	1,18,503	41.07	217
Barabanki	267	Ramnagar	69.60	Fareed Mahfooz Kidwai	SP	98,799	41.96	Sharad Kumar Awasthi	BJP	98,538	41.85	261
Barabanki	268	Barabanki	67.93	Dharmraj Singh Yadav	SP	1,25,500	47.11	Dr. Ramkumari Maurya	BJP	90,450	33.95	35,050
Barabanki	269	Zaidpur (SC)	70.00	Gaurav Kumar	SP	1,13,558	40.86	Ambrish Rawat	BJP	1,10,576	39.79	2,982
Barabanki	270	Dariyabad	66.32	Satish Sharma	BJP	1,27,983	46.87	Arvind Kumar Singh Gope	SP	95,366	35.03	32,617
Ayodhya	271	Rudauli	61.38	Ram Chandra Yadav	BJP	94,031	42.95	Anand Sen	SP	53,415	24.40	40,616
Barabanki	272	Haidergarh (SC)	65.78	Dinesh Rawat	BJP	1,17,113	50.90	Ram Magan Rawat	SP	91,422	39.73	25,691
Ayodhya	273	Milkipur (SC)	60.44	Awadhesh Prasad	SP	1,03,905	47.99	Baba Gorakhnath	BJP	90,567	41.83	13,338
Ayodhya	274	Bikapur	63.65	Amit Singh Chauhan	BJP	1,07,268	44.24	Firoz Khan	SP	1,01,708	42.04	5,560
Ayodhya	275	Ayodhya	60.53	Ved Prakash Gupta	BJP	1,13,414	49.04	Tej Narayan Pandey	SP	93,424	40.40	19,990
Ayodhya	276	Goshainganj	61.07	Abhay Singh	SP	1,05,863	43.87	Arti Tiwari	BJP	92,784	38.45	13,079
Ambedkar Nagar	277	Katehari	62.79	Lalji Verma	SP	93,524	37.78	Avadhesh Kumar	NISHAD	85,828	34.67	7,696
Ambedkar Nagar	278	Tanda	66.43	Ram Murti Verma	SP	95,263	43.49	Kapil Deo	BJP	63,166	28.84	32,097
Ambedkar Nagar	279	Alapur (SC)	61.37	Tribhuwan Dutt	SP	74,165	35.55	Triveniram	BJP	64,782	31.05	9,383
Ambedkar Nagar	280	Jalalpur	63.60	Rakesh Pandey	SP	93,668	36.18	Dr. Rajesh Singh	BSP	80,038	30.91	13,630
Ambedkar Nagar	281	Akbarpur	64.60	Ram Achal Rajbhar	SP	81,391	38.14	Dharmraj Nishad	BJP	69,595	32.39	12,336
Bahraich	282	Balha (SC)	59.22	Saroj Sonkar	BJP	1,00,483	46.78	Akshaybar Nath Kanaujiya	SP	83,910	39.06	16,573
Bahraich	283	Nanpara	58.07	Ram Niwas Verma	AD(S)	87,689	43.91	Madhuri Verma	SP	75,505	37.81	12,184
Bahraich	284	Matera	62.64	Mariya Shah	SP	1,02,255	48.13	Arun Veer Singh	BJP	91,827	43.24	10,428
Bahraich	285	Mahasi	63.06	Sureshwar Singh	BJP	1,17,883	54.58	Krishna Kumar Ojha	SP	75,199	34.82	42,684
Bahraich	286	Bahraich	59.04	Anupma Jaiswal	BJP	1,07,628	46.45	Yasar Shah	SP	1,03,550	44.69	4,078
Bahraich	287	Payagpur	59.12	Subhash Tripathi	BJP	1,10,162	47.77	Mukesh Srivastava	SP	98,106	42.54	12,056
Bahraich	288	Kaiserganj	58.13	Anand Kumar	SP	1,03,195	45.51	Gaurav Verma	BJP	95,424	42.11	7,771
Shrawasti	289	Bhinga	58.76	Indrani Devi	SP	1,03,661	44.85	Padam Sen Chaudhary	BJP	90,087	38.98	13,574
Shrawasti	290	Shrawasti	60.81	Ram Feran Pandey	BJP	98,640	38.98	Mohhamad Aslam Rainee	SP	97,183	38.40	1,457
Balrampur	291	Tulsipur	52.81	Kailash Nath Shukla	BJP	87,092	42.92	Zeba Rizwan	IND	51,251	25.27	35,841
Balrampur	292	Gainsari	51.94	Shiv Pratap Yadav	SP	75,345	39.68	Shailesh Kumar Singh	BJP	69,508	36.61	5,837
Balrampur	293	Utraula	45.07	Ram Pratap Verma	BJP	87,162	44.43	Haseeb Hasan Khan	SP	65,393	33.93	21,769
Balrampur	294	Balrampur (SC)	48.30	Paltu Ram	BJP	1,01,146	48.93	Jagram Paswan	SP	90,175	43.62	10,971
Gonda	295	Mehnaun	58.58	Vinay Kumar Dwivedi	BJP	1,07,237	50.05	Nandita Shukla	SP	84,109	39.22	23,128
Gonda	296	Gonda	57.54	Prateek Bhushan Singh	BJP	96,528	48.21	Suraj Singh	SP	89,828	44.87	6,700
Gonda	297	Katra Bazar	60.54	Bawan Singh	BJP	1,12,291	47.86	Baijnath Dubey	SP	93,834	39.99	18,457
Gonda	298	Colonelganj	58.64	Ajay	BJP	1,08,109	55.80	Yogesh Pratap Singh	SP	72,637	37.49	35,472
Gonda	299	Tarabganj	57.46	Prem Narayan Pandey	BJP	1,25,325	59.39	Ram Bhajan Chaubey	SP	71,365	33.95	53,690
Gonda	300	Mankapur (SC)	55.20	Ramapati Shastri	BJP	1,05,677	57.69	Ramesh Chandra	SP	63,328	34.57	42,349
Gonda	301	Gaura	53.79	Prabhat Kumar Verma	BJP	73,545	42.62	Sanjay Kumar	SP	50,571	29.31	22,974
Siddharthnagar	302	Shohratgarh	52.81	Vinay Verma	AD(S)	71,062	37.46	Prem Chand Nishad	SBSP	46,599	22.56	24,463
Siddharthnagar	303	Kapilvastu (SC)	55.71	Shyam Dhani	BJP	1,22,940	48.72	Vinay Paswan	SP	92,001	36.46	30,939
Siddharthnagar	304	Bansi	49.51	Jai Pratap Singh	BJP	84,596	44.82	Monu Dubey	SP	64,256	34.04	20,340
Siddharthnagar	305	Itwa	49.56	Mata Prasad Pandey	SP	64,253	38.54	Satish Chandra Dwiwedi	BJP	62,591	37.55	1,662
Siddharthnagar	306	Domariyaganj	50.42	Saiyada Khatoon	SP	85,098	41.19	Raghvendra Pratap Singh	BJP	84,327	40.82	771
Basti	307	Harraiya	56.91	Ajay Kumar Singh	BJP	88,200	39.75	Triyambak Pathak	SP	69,871	31.57	18,329
Basti	308	Kaptanganj	59.09	Kavindra Chaudhary	SP	94,273	43.66	Chandra Prakash Shukla	BJP	70,094	32.46	24,179
Basti	309	Rudhauli	54.47	Rajendra Prasad Chaudhary	SP	86,360	36.82	Sangeeta Pratap Jaiswal	BJP	71,134	30.33	15,226
Basti	310	Basti Sadar	58.56	Mahendra Nath Yadav	SP	86,029	39.81	Dayaram Choudhary	BJP	84,250	38.99	1,779
Basti	311	Mahadewa (SC)	58.16	Dudhram	SBSP	83,350	39.47	Ravi Kumar Sonkar	BJP	77,855	36.87	5,495
Sant Kabir Nagar	312	Menhdawal	52.90	Anil Kumar Tripathi	NISHAD	90,193	37.23	Jay Chand	SP	84,970	35.08	5,223
Sant Kabir Nagar	313	Khalilabad	54.72	Ankur Raj Tiwari	BJP	76,086	30.36	Digvijay Narayan	SP	63,464	25.32	12,262
Sant Kabir Nagar	314	Dhanghata (SC)	55.81	Ganesh Chandra Chauhan	BJP	83,241	38.50	Alagu Prasad	SBSP	72,688	33.62	10,553
Maharajganj	315	Pharenda	60.90	Virendra Chaudhary	INC	85,181	40.28	Bajrang Bahadur Singh	BJP	83,935	39.69	1,246
Maharajganj	316	Nautanwa	61.50	Rishi Tripathi	NISHAD	90,263	40.03	Kunwar Kaushal Singh	SP	74,392	33.23	15,691
Maharajganj	317	Siswa	65.51	Prem Sagar Patel	BJP	1,27,673	50.05	Sushil Kumar Tibrewal	SP	64,942	25.46	62,731
Maharajganj	318	Maharajganj (SC)	63.45	Jai Mangal Kanojiya	BJP	1,36,071	51.08	Nirmesh Mangal	IND	59,168	22.53	76,903
Maharajganj	319	Paniyara	61.36	Gyanendra Singh	BJP	1,35,463	52.11	Krishnabhan Singh Sainthwar	SP	74,035	28.48	61,428
Gorakhpur	320	Caimpiyarganj	58.48	Fateh Bahadur Singh	BJP	1,22,032	54.38	Kajal Nishad	SP	79,376	35.37	42,656
Gorakhpur	321	Pipraich	63.73	Mahendra Pal Singh	BJP	1,41,780	54.86	Amrendra Nishad	SP	76,423	29.57	65,357
Gorakhpur	322	Gorakhpur Urban	53.80	Yogi Adityanath	BJP	1,65,499	66.18	Subhawati Shukla	SP	62,109	24.84	1,03,390
Gorakhpur	323	Gorakhpur Rural	60.79	Bipin Singh	BJP	1,26,376	49.59	Vijay Bahadur Yadav	SP	1,02,306	40.14	24,070
Gorakhpur	324	Sahajanwa	59.13	Pradeep Shukla	BJP	1,05,981	47.21	Yashwant Singh Rawat	SP	62,575	27.87	43,406
Gorakhpur	325	Khajani (SC)	52.31	Sriram Chauhan	BJP	90,210	45.31	Rupawati Beldar	SP	53,109	26.71	37,101
Gorakhpur	326	Chauri-Chaura	57.99	Sarvan Kumar Nishad	BJP	91,958	44.65	Brijesh Chandra Lal Paswan	SP	50,831	24.68	41,127
Gorakhpur	327	Bansgaon (SC)	49.48	Vimlesh Paswan	BJP	87,224	46.26	Sanjay Kumar	SP	54,915	29.13	32,209
Gorakhpur	328	Chillupar	52.98	Rajesh Tripathi	BJP	96,777	42.49	Vinay Shankar Tiwari	SP	75,132	32.98	21,645
Kushinagar	329	Khadda	60.27	Vivekanand Pandey	NISHAD	88,291	43.08	Vijay Pratap Kushwaha	IND	46,840	22.85	41,451
Kushinagar	330	Padrauna	60.10	Manish Jaiswal	BJP	1,14,496	49.80	Vikram Yadav	SP	72,488	31.53	42,008
Kushinagar	331	Tamkuhi Raj	56.60	Asim Kumar	BJP	1,15,123	50.81	Uday Narayan	SP	48,651	21.47	66,472
Kushinagar	332	Fazilnagar	56.20	Surendra Kumar Kushwaha	BJP	1,16,029	51.61	Swami Prasad Maurya	SP	71,015	31.15	45,014
Kushinagar	333	Kushinagar	59.23	Panchanand Pathak	BJP	1,15,268	52.14	Rajesh Pratap Rao	SP	80,478	36.40	34,790
Kushinagar	334	Hata	58.00	Mohan Verma	BJP	1,20,666	55.70	Ranvijay Singh	SP	61,301	28.30	59,365
Kushinagar	335	Ramkola (SC)	57.58	Vinay Prakash Gond	BJP	1,24,792	58.27	Purnmasi Dehati	SBSP	52,249	24.40	72,543
Deoria	336	Rudrapur	56.59	Jai Prakash Nishad	BJP	78,187	42.99	Ram Bhuwal Nishad	SP	36,251	19.93	41,936
Deoria	337	Deoria	56.69	Shalabh Mani Tripathi	BJP	1,06,701	53.52	Ajay Pratap Singh	SP	66,046	33.13	40,655
Deoria	338	Pathardeva	59.37	Surya Pratap Shahi	BJP	93,858	46.65	Brahma Shankar Tripathi	SP	65,177	32.40	28,681
Deoria	339	Rampur Karkhana	58.08	Surendra Chaurasia	BJP	90,742	43.85	Ghazala Lari	SP	76,072	36.76	14,670
Deoria	340	Bhatpar Rani	57.43	Sabhakunwar Kushawaha	BJP	91,282	46.98	Ashutosh Upadhyay	SP	73,200	37.68	18,082
Deoria	341	Salempur (SC)	51.65	Vijay Laxmi Gautam	BJP	82,047	46.15	Manbodh Prasad	SBSP	65,439	36.80	16,608
Deoria	342	Barhaj	58.11	Deepak Kumar Mishra	BJP	85,758	46.33	Murli Manohar Jaiswal	SP	68,897	37.22	16,861
Azamgarh	343	Atrauliya	60.86	Sangram Yadav	SP	91,502	39.55	Prashant Singh	NISHAD	74,255	32.10	17,247
Azamgarh	344	Gopalpur	58.94	Nafees Ahmad	SP	84,401	40.87	Satyendra Rai	BJP	60,094	29.10	24,307
Azamgarh	345	Sagri	57.77	Hriday Narayan Singh Patel	SP	83,093	42.76	Smt. Vandana Singh	BJP	60,578	31.17	22,515
Azamgarh	346	Mubarakpur	63.29	Akhilesh Yadav	SP	80,726	36.02	Arvind Jaiswal	BJP	51,623	23.03	29,103
Azamgarh	347	Azamgarh	59.64	Durga Prasad Yadav	SP	100,813	42.66	Akhilesh Kumar Mishra	BJP	84,777	35.87	16,036
Azamgarh	348	Nizamabad	56.40	Alambadi	SP	79,835	43.22	Manoj	BJP	45,648	24.71	34,187
Azamgarh	349	Phoolpur Pawai	58.77	Ramakant Yadav	SP	81,164	42.00	Ramsurat Rajbhar	BJP	55,858	28.91	25,306
Azamgarh	350	Didarganj	54.98	Kamlakant Rajbhar	SP	74,342	36.99	Krishna Murari Vishwakarma	BJP	60,781	30.25	13,561
Azamgarh	351	Lalganj (SC)	53.65	Bechai Saroj	SP	83,767	38.31	Neelam Sonkar	BJP	69,034	31.57	14,733
Azamgarh	352	Mehnagar (SC)	54.67	Puja Saroj	SP	86,960	39.35	Manju Saroj	BJP	72,811	32.94	14,149
Mau	353	Madhuban	55.54	Ram Bilash Chauhan	BJP	79,032	35.24	Umesh Pandey	SP	74,584	33.26	4,448
Mau	354	Ghosi	58.53	Dara Singh Chauhan	SP	108,430	42.21	Vijay Rajbhar	BJP	86,214	33.57	22,216
Mau	355	Muhammadabad-Gohna (SC)	60.00	Rajendra Kumar	SP	94,688	41.48	Smt. Poonam Saroj	BJP	68,039	29.80	26,649
Mau	356	Mau	57.92	Abbas Ansari	SBSP	124,691	44.69	Ashok Singh	BJP	86,575	31.03	38,116
Ballia	357	Belthara Road (SC)	55.72	Hansu Ram	SBSP	78,995	39.57	Chhattu Ram	BJP	73,481	36.81	5,514
Ballia	358	Rasara	56.28	Umashankar Singh	BSP	87,887	43.82	Mahendra	SBSP	81,304	40.54	6,583
Ballia	359	Sikanderpur	57.30	Mohammed Ziauddin Rizvi	SP	75,446	42.75	Sanjay Yadav	BJP	63,591	36.03	11,855
Ballia	360	Phephana	57.27	Sangram Singh	SP	92,516	48.78	Upendra Tiwari	BJP	73,162	38.57	19,354
Ballia	361	Ballia Nagar	54.04	Daya Shankar Singh	BJP	103,873	51.22	Narad Rai	SP	77,634	38.28	26,239
Ballia	362	Bansdih	53.08	Ketakee Singh	BJP	103,305	47.67	Ram Govind Chaudhary	SP	81,953	37.82	21,352
Ballia	363	Bairia	48.11	Jai Prakash Anchal	SP	71,241	40.33	Anand Swarup Shukla	BJP	58,290	33.00	12,951
Jaunpur	364	Badlapur	59.03	Ramesh Chandra Mishra	BJP	82,391	39.72	Baba Dubey	SP	81,065	39.08	1,326
Jaunpur	365	Shahganj	59.13	Ramesh Singh	NISHAD	87,233	36.21	Shailendra Yadav Lalai	SP	86,514	35.91	719
Jaunpur	366	Jaunpur	57.03	Girish Chandra Yadav	BJP	97,760	39.35	Mohd. Arshad Khan	SP	89,708	36.11	8,052
Jaunpur	367	Malhani	60.28	Lucky Yadav	SP	97,357	42.57	Dhananjay Singh	JD(U)	79,830	34.91	17,527
Jaunpur	368	Mungra Badshahpur	56.85	Pankaj Patel	SP	92,048	41.90	Ajay Dubey	BJP	86,818	39.52	5,230
Jaunpur	369	Machhlishahr (SC)	54.30	Ragini Sonkar	SP	91,659	41.99	Mihilal Gautam	BJP	83,175	38.10	8,484
Jaunpur	370	Mariyahu	57.38	R.K. Patel	AD(S)	76,007	39.25	Sushma Patel	SP	74,801	38.62	1,206
Jaunpur	371	Zafrabad	56.05	Jagdish Narayan	SBSP	90,620	40.57	Harendra Prasad Singh	BJP	84,328	37.76	6,292
Jaunpur	372	Kerakat (SC)	57.65	Tufani Saroj	SP	94,022	39.13	Dinesh Choudhary	BJP	84,178	35.04	9,844
Ghazipur	373	Jakhanian (SC)	58.89	Triveni Ram	SBSP	1,13,378	44.53	Ramraj Vanvasi	BJP	76,513	30.05	36,865
Ghazipur	374	Saidpur (SC)	59.06	Ankit Bharti	SP	1,09,711	46.36	Subhash Passi	BJP	73,076	30.88	36,635
Ghazipur	375	Ghazipur Sadar	62.04	Jai Kishan Sahu	SP	92,472	40.81	Sangeeta Balwant Bind	BJP	90,780	40.06	1,692
Ghazipur	376	Jangipur	61.16	Virendra Kumar Yadav	SP	1,03,125	44.75	Ramnaresh Kushwah	BJP	68,062	29.53	35,063
Ghazipur	377	Zahoorabad	60.74	Om Prakash Rajbhar	SBSP	1,14,860	46.45	Kalicharan Rajbhar	BJP	69,228	21.49	45,632
Ghazipur	378	Mohammadabad	57.95	Suhaib Ansari	SP	1,11,443	45.26	Alka Rai	BJP	92,684	37.64	18,759
Ghazipur	379	Zamania	54.79	Omprakash Singh	SP	94,695	40.57	Sunita Singh	BJP	72,239	30.95	22,456
Chandauli	380	Mughalsarai	60.14	Ramesh Jaiswal	BJP	102,216	42.40	Chandra Shekhar Yadav	SP	87,295	36.21	14,921
Chandauli	381	Sakaldiha	63.16	Prabhunarayan Yadav	SP	86,328	40.70	Suryamuni Tiwari	BJP	69,667	32.84	16,661
Chandauli	382	Saiyadraja	63.02	Sushil Singh	BJP	87,891	41.85	Manoj Kumar	SP	76,974	36.65	10,917
Chandauli	383	Chakia (SC)	65.22	Kailash Kharwar	BJP	97,812	39.63	Jitendra Kumar	SP	88,561	35.88	9,251
Varanasi	384	Pindra	59.05	Awadhesh Kumar Singh	BJP	84,325	38.23	Babu Lal	BSP	48,766	22.11	35,559
Varanasi	385	Ajagara (SC)	65.52	Tribhuwan Ram	BJP	101,088	41.25	Sunil Sonkar	SBSP	91,928	37.51	9,160
Varanasi	386	Shivpur	67.22	Anil Rajbhar	BJP	115,231	45.76	Arvind Rajbhar	SBSP	87,544	34.77	27,687
Varanasi	387	Rohaniya	60.39	Dr. Sunil Patel	AD(S)	118,663	48.08	Abhay Patel	AD(K)	72,191	29.25	46,472
Varanasi	388	Varanasi North	57.65	Ravindra Jaiswal	BJP	134,471	54.61	Ashfaque	SP	93,695	38.05	40,776
Varanasi	389	Varanasi South	60.51	Neelkanth Tiwari	BJP	99,622	50.88	Kameshwar (Kishan Dixit)	SP	88,900	45.41	10,722
Varanasi	390	Varanasi Cantt.	53.89	Saurabh Srivastava	BJP	147,833	60.63	Pooja Yadav	SP	60,989	25.01	86,844
Varanasi	391	Sevapuri	63.83	Neel Ratan Singh Patel	BJP	105,163	47.60	Surendra Singh Patel	SP	82,632	37.41	22,531
Bhadohi	392	Bhadohi	58.33	Zahid Beg	SP	100,738	40.24	Ravindra Tripathi	BJP	95,853	38.29	4,885
Bhadohi	393	Gyanpur	55.66	Vipul Dubey	NISHAD	73,446	34.12	Ram Kishore Bind	SP	67,215	31.23	6,231
Bhadohi	394	Aurai (SC)	59.50	Dinanath Bhashkar	BJP	93,691	41.69	Smt. Anjani	SP	92,044	40.95	1,647
Mirzapur	395	Chhanbey (SC)	57.91	Rahul Prakash Kol	AD(S)	102,502	47.29	Kirti	SP	64,389	29.71	38,113
Mirzapur	396	Mirzapur	56.46	Ratnakar Mishra	BJP	118,642	52.09	Kailash Chaurasia	SP	78,766	34.58	39,876
Mirzapur	397	Majhawan	61.68	Dr. Vinod Kumar Bind	NISHAD	103,235	42.07	Rohit Shukla	SP	69,648	28.38	33,587
Mirzapur	398	Chunar	62.33	Anurag Singh	BJP	110,980	50.26	Ramashankar Prasad Singh	AD(K)	63,366	28.70	47,614
Mirzapur	399	Marihan	64.59	Rama Shankar Singh	BJP	105,377	44.51	Narendra Singh Kushwaha	BSP	42,466	17.94	62,911
Sonbhadra	400	Ghorawal	63.50	Anil Kumar Maurya	BJP	101,277	40.46	Ramesh Chandra Dubey	SP	77,355	30.90	23,922
Sonbhadra	401	Robertsganj	61.06	Bhupesh Chaubey	BJP	84,496	40.29	Avinash Kushwaha	SP	78,875	37.61	5,621
Sonbhadra	402	Obra (ST)	49.80	Sanjeev Kumar Gond	BJP	78,364	48.04	Arvind Kumar	SP	51,922	31.83	26,442
Sonbhadra	403	Duddhi (ST)	61.58	Ramdular Gaur	BJP	84,407	41.28	Vijay Singh Gour	SP	78,110	38.20	6,297

== Bypolls (2022-2027) ==
Date	S.No	Constituency	MLA before election	Party before election	Elected MLA	Party after election
3 November 2022	139	Gola Gokrannath	Arvind Giri	Bharatiya Janata Party	Aman Giri	Bharatiya Janata Party
5 December 2022	37	Rampur	Azam Khan	Samajwadi Party	Akash Saxena	Bharatiya Janata Party
5 December 2022	15	Khatauli	Vikram Singh Saini	Bharatiya Janata Party	Madan Kasana	Rashtriya Lok Dal
10 May 2023	34	Suar	Abdullah Azam Khan	Samajwadi Party	Shafeek Ahmed Ansari	Apna Dal (Sonelal)
10 May 2023	395	Chhanbey (SC)	Rahul Prakash Kol	Apna Dal (Sonelal)	Rinki Kol	Apna Dal (Sonelal)
5 September 2023	354	Ghosi	Dara Singh Chauhan	Samajwadi Party	Sudhakar Singh	Samajwadi Party
13 May 2024	136	Dadraul	Manvendra Singh	Bharatiya Janata Party	Arvind Kumar Singh	Bharatiya Janata Party
20 May 2024	173	Lucknow East	Ashutosh Tandon	Bharatiya Janata Party	O. P. Srivastava	Bharatiya Janata Party
25 May 2024	292	Gainsari	Shiv Pratap Yadav	Samajwadi Party	Rakesh Kumar Yadav	Samajwadi Party
1 June 2024	403	Duddhi (ST)	Ramdular Gaur	Bharatiya Janata Party	Vijay Singh Gond	Samajwadi Party
20 November 2024	16	Meerapur	Chandan Chauhan	Rashtriya Lok Dal	Mithlesh Pal	Rashtriya Lok Dal
20 November 2024	29	Kundarki	Ziaur Rahman Barq	Samajwadi Party	Ramveer Singh	Bharatiya Janata Party
20 November 2024	56	Ghaziabad	Atul Garg	Bharatiya Janata Party	Sanjeev Sharma	Bharatiya Janata Party
20 November 2024	71	Khair (SC)	Anoop Pradhan	Bharatiya Janata Party	Surender Diler	Bharatiya Janata Party
20 November 2024	110	Karhal	Akhilesh Yadav	Samajwadi Party	Tej Pratap Singh Yadav	Samajwadi Party
20 November 2024	213	Sishamau	Haji Irfan Solanki	Samajwadi Party	Naseem Solanki	Samajwadi Party
20 November 2024	256	Phulpur	Praveen Patel	Bharatiya Janata Party	Deepak Patel	Bharatiya Janata Party
20 November 2024	277	Katehari	Lalji Verma	Samajwadi Party	Dharmraj Nishad	Bharatiya Janata Party
20 November 2024	397	Majhawan	Vinod Kumar Bind	NISHAD Party	Suchismita Maurya	Bharatiya Janata Party
5 February 2025	273	Milkipur (SC)	Awadhesh Prasad	Samajwadi Party	Chandrabhanu Paswan	Bharatiya Janata Party
TBD	122	Faridpur	Shyam Bihari Lal	Bharatiya Janata Party	TBD	
TBD	354	Ghosi	Sudhakar Singh	Samajwadi Party	TBD	
TBD	403	Duddhi (ST)	Vijay Singh	Samajwadi Party	TBD	

== See also ==
- 2022 elections in India
- 18th Uttar Pradesh Assembly
- Elections in Uttar Pradesh
