= Meja Assembly constituency =

Constituency of the Uttar Pradesh legislative assembly in India

Coordinates: 25.14°N 82.11°E

Meja
- Constituency No. 259 for the Uttar Pradesh Legislative Assembly

Constituency details
- Country: India
- Region: North India
- State: Uttar Pradesh
- District: Prayagraj
- Total electors: 319,312 (2019)
- Reservation: None

Member of Legislative Assembly
- 18th Uttar Pradesh Legislative Assembly
- Incumbent Sandeep Singh Patel
- Party: Samajwadi Party
- Elected year: 2022

Meja is a constituency of the Uttar Pradesh Legislative Assembly covering the city of Meja in the Prayagraj district of Uttar Pradesh, India.

Meja is one of five assembly constituencies in the Allahabad Lok Sabha constituency. Since 2008, this assembly constituency is numbered 259 amongst 403 constituencies.

Currently this seat belongs to Samajwadi Party candidate Sandeep Singh who won in last Assembly election of 2022 Uttar Pradesh Legislative Elections defeating Bhartiya Janata Party candidate Neelam Karwariya by a margin of 3295 votes.

== Members of the Legislative Assembly ==
Election	Name	Party
2012	Girish Chandra	Samajwadi Party
2017	Neelam Karwariya	Bharatiya Janata Party
2022	Sandeep Singh Patel	Samajwadi Party

== Election results ==
=== 2027 ===
2027 Uttar Pradesh Legislative Assembly election: Meja
Party	Candidate	Votes	%	±%
INDIA				
NDA				
BSP				
NOTA	None of the above			
Majority				
Turnout				
gain from		Swing		

=== 2022 ===
2022 Uttar Pradesh Legislative Assembly election: Meja
Party	Candidate	Votes	%	±%
SP	Sandeep Singh Patel	78,555	42.12	+15.65
BJP	Neelam Karvariya	75,116	40.28	+2.86
BSP	Savesh Chandra Tiwari	22,933	12.3	−12.33
NOTA	None of the above	1,768	0.95	−0.43
Majority		3,439	1.84	−9.11
Turnout		186,497	57.22	−1.08
SP gain from BJP		Swing		

=== 2017 ===
2017 Uttar Pradesh Legislative Assembly Election: Meja
Party	Candidate	Votes	%	±%
BJP	Neelam Karwariya	67,807	37.42	
SP	Ram Sewak Singh Patel	47,964	26.47	
BSP	Surendra Alias S.K.Mishra	44,622	24.63	
NISHAD	Sarvesh Chandra Alias Baba Tiwari	11,535	6.37	
NOTA	None of the above	2,459	1.38	
Majority		19,843	10.95	
Turnout		181,184	58.3	
