= Sandeep Singh Patel =

Indian politician

Member of Uttar Pradesh Legislative Assembly
- Incumbent
- Assumed office 2022
- Preceded by: Neelam Karwariya
- Constituency: Meja Assembly constituency

Personal details
- Party: Samajwadi Party
- Occupation: Politician

Sandeep Singh Patel, also known as Sandeep Singh, is an Indian politician of the Samajwadi Party, currently serving as a member of the Uttar Pradesh Legislative Assembly, representing Meja. He defeated incumbent BJP MLA Neelam Karwariya by 3,441 votes in the 2022 Uttar Pradesh Legislative Assembly election.
