= Sushil Kumar Tibrewal =

Minister of State, Government of Uttar Pradesh
- In office 29 January 2015 – 19 March 2017

Vice-Chairman of the Uttar Pradesh Housing and Development Board
- In office 29 January 2015 – 19 March 2017

Personal details
- Born: 1 March 1957 (age 69) Siswa, Maharajganj district, Uttar Pradesh, India
- Party: Samajwadi Party
- Spouse: Laxmi Devi Tibrewal
- Children: 4 (2 daughters, 2 sons)
- Profession: Politician
- Portfolio: Vice-Chairman of the Uttar Pradesh Housing and Development Board during the Akhilesh Yadav's government

Sushil Kumar Tibrewal is an Indian politician affiliated with the Samajwadi Party. He served as the vice-chairman of the Uttar Pradesh Housing and Development Board and held the position of Minister of State in the Government of Uttar Pradesh from 2015 to 2017 under Chief Minister Akhilesh Yadav.

== Early life and education ==
Sushil Kumar Tibrewal was born on 1 March 1957 in Siswa, Maharajganj district, Uttar Pradesh. He completed his education at Ganesh Shankar Vidyarthi Smarak Inter College, Maharajganj, in 1975.

== Political career ==
Tibrewal is a senior leader of the Samajwadi Party. He served as vice-chairman of the Uttar Pradesh Housing and Development Board, a government agency responsible for housing development and urban planning from 2015 to 2017, during which he held the rank of Minister of State. In the 2022 Uttar Pradesh Legislative Assembly election, he contested from the Siswa Assembly constituency on Samajwadi Party ticket and secured 64,942 votes.

He has also been a member of several committees of Government of India, including the Civil Aviation Committee of the North Zone, the Divisional Railway Users' Consultative Committee (DRUCC) of Northern Railway, and the Telephone Advisory Committee (TAC) in Gorakhpur. Tibrewal was the Chairman of Kendriya Upbhokta Sahakari Bhandar Limited in Maharajganj, a cooperative society.

== See also ==
- Akhilesh Yadav ministry
- List of people from Uttar Pradesh
