= Amit Agrawal =

Indian mechanical engineer (born 1974)

- Born: Allahabad, India
- Education: (B.Tech) IIT Kanpur (PhD) University of Delaware
- Known for: Work on diagnostic microdevices
- Scientific career
- Fields: Fluid dynamics
- Workplaces: Tata Motors; IIT Bombay

Amit Agrawal is an Indian mechanical engineer and an institute chair professor at the Department of Mechanical Engineering of the Indian Institute of Technology, Bombay. He leads a group of scientists who are involved in the development of next-generation diagnostic microdevices.

Agrawal, who started his career as an engineer at Tata Motors, Pune, did his post-doctoral work at the University of Newcastle, Australia during 2003–04 before joining the Indian Institute of Technology, Bombay (IITB) as assistant professor in 2004, where he is an institute chair professor at the department of mechanical engineering since 2015. The team led by him at IITB has developed several microdevices of which a few have already been licensed to others for commercial use.

Agrawal has published several articles, ResearchGate, an online repository of scientific articles has listed 198 of them. The Council of Scientific and Industrial Research, the apex agency of the Government of India for scientific research, awarded him the Shanti Swarup Bhatnagar Prize for Science and Technology, one of the highest Indian science awards, for his contributions to engineering sciences in 2018.

== Biography ==
Amit Agrawal was born in Allahabad, Uttar Pradesh. He studied at St Joseph's College, Allahabad (1979–1992), before joining IIT Kanpur for a BTech in mechanical engineering. He continued his higher studies after a brief stint (from 1996 to 1998) at Tata Motors (then Telco), Pune. He completed PhD from the University of Delaware (in 2002) and a postdoc from the University of Newcastle, Australia. He joined IIT Bombay as an assistant professor in July 2004 and was promoted to associate professor in 2009. He has been a professor at the same institute since 2014 and has also been an institute chair professor since October 2015.

== Legacy ==
Agrawal works in the areas of fluid mechanics and heat transfer, with specialization in microscale flows, turbulent flows, and bio-microdevices. His fundamental study on blood flow in microchannel led to the development of a unique microdevice capable of separating the liquid component of blood (plasma) from whole blood, with >99% purity. This Blood Plasma Separation microdevice (of two-rupees coin size) performs the function of centrifuge at the microscale. The microdevice is truly novel because there is no filter/membrane or any active element therein; the separation rather happens passively as the flow occurs. This exclusive strategy allows the microdevice to cover a wide spectrum of applications, including those that the current filter-based technologies cannot even remotely cater to. He has developed other innovative microdevices (notably, Three-dimensional hydrodynamic focusing microdevice; Constant wall temperature microdevice; Platelet Rich Plasma Generation Microdevice; Micropump). Such niche microdevices, based on innovative design principles, cater to important needs of society and are expected to change the way blood tests are done worldwide in the future.

The Navier-Stokes equation has been employed to describe flow for more than a century. However, the need for more accurate equations has been noted because of the limitations of this equation in the high Knudsen number range. Agrawal employed the Onsager-principle consistent distribution function to solve the Boltzmann equation and derived entirely new sets of equations (as opposed to adding ad hoc terms to the available equations, commonly undertaken in the literature), termed as OBurnett and O13 equations which are a superset of the Navier-Stokes equations. This is particularly significant as the proposed equations are of second-order and unconditionally stable; the two issues that have plagued all existing higher-order equations and their variants. These may be the thermodynamically consistent higher-order equations that scientists have been trying to derive for several decades now! Early results show that the derived equations are indeed accurate. Further, he proposed an innovative iterative approach to solve such higher-order equations analytically, and solved two different problems within Burnett hydrodynamics for the first time. The approach is general enough to apply to other non-linear partial differential equations. Agrawal has written a book entitled Microscale Flow and Heat Transfer: Mathematical Modeling and Flow Physics explaining these higher-order transport equations. The development of these accurate higher-order continuum transport equations is expected to rejuvenate the entire subject of hydrodynamics.

Agrawal has worked on several other scientifically challenging and industrially relevant problems, including the problem of interacting wakes, synthetic jets, gaseous slip flow, and boiling in microchannel. Due to these important scientific and technological contributions, Agrawal was invited to serve as editor of three important journals – Scientific Reports, Experimental Thermal and Fluid Science, Sadhana; and elected as Fellow by Indian National Academy of Engineering (INAE) and National Academy of Sciences India (NASI). He has won several awards and recognitions, including the Shanti Swarup Bhatnagar Prize for Science and Technology, one of the highest Indian science awards, for his contributions to engineering sciences in 2018.

== Patents ==
Agrawal has several patents awarded/applied: (i) Blood plasma separation in a microdevice (for separating high-quality plasma from whole blood; acts as a substitute for centrifuge at microscale) (ii) Three-dimensional hydrodynamic focusing microdevice (for making cells move in a single file thereby allowing their properties to be probed unambiguously at a sensing station, with application to flow cytometer) (iii) Constant wall temperature microdevice (for maintaining cells at a desired temperature in a microdevice and microscale-PCR) (iv) Platelet-rich plasma generation microdevice (for obtaining plasma rich in platelets from whole blood using hydrodynamic based separation) (v) Platelet-poor plasma generation microdevice (for obtaining plasma poor in platelet from whole blood using hydrodynamic based separation) (vi) Thumb-operated micropump (for pumping fluids in a microdevice without external power supply) (vii) Microdevice for capturing beads, single cells and bacteria, and low volume of protein/mRNA (for capturing biological entities of interest on a biomimetic platform) (viii) Multiple-orifice synthetic jet (for cooling in space constraint applications such as notepad) (ix) Microchannel based cooling of an electronic device (for mitigating hot spots in an electronic chip) (x) Vortex cross-correlation flowmeter (for metering flow rate in a conduit) (xi) Header design for multiple microchannels-based microdevices (for ensuring uniform flow distribution in multiple microchannels-based microdevices) (xii) Three-dimensional particle image velocimetry system (for measuring three-dimensional flow velocity in space)

== Selected bibliography ==
- Bhandarkar, U. V.; Agrawal, Amit; Hemadri, Vadiraj (1 October 2018). "Determination of tangential momentum accommodation coefficient and slip coefficients for rarefied gas flow in a microchannel". Sādhanā. 43 (10): 164. doi:10.1007/s12046-018-0929-4. ISSN 0973-7677.
- Agrawal, Amit; Duryodhan, V. S.; Hemadri, Vadiraj (1 February 2018). "Liquid and gas flows in microchannels of varying cross section: a comparative analysis of the flow dynamics and design perspectives". Microfluidics and Nanofluidics. 22 (2): 19. doi:10.1007/s10404-018-2034-8. ISSN 1613-4990. S2CID 102682551.
- Shah, Niraj; Gavasane, Abhimanyu; Agrawal, Amit; Bhandarkar, Upendra (19 October 2017). "Comparison of Various Pressure Based Boundary Conditions for Three-Dimensional Subsonic DSMC Simulation". Journal of Fluids Engineering. 140 (3): 031205–031205–12. doi:10.1115/1.4037679. ISSN 0098-2202.
- Joshi, Suhas S.; Agrawal, Amit; Kattemalalawadi, Bharath S.; Gaddam, Anvesh (1 August 2017). "Demarcating wetting states in textured microchannels under flow conditions by Poiseuille number". Microfluidics and Nanofluidics. 21 (8): 137. doi:10.1007/s10404-017-1974-8. ISSN 1613-4990. S2CID 103813194.
- Duryodhan, V. S.; Singh, Shiv Govind; Agrawal, Amit (20 April 2017). "Effect of Cross Aspect Ratio on Flow in Diverging and Converging Microchannels". Journal of Fluids Engineering. 139 (6): 061203–061203–9. doi:10.1115/1.4035945. ISSN 0098-2202.

== See also ==
- Microchannel (microtechnology)
- Microtechnology
