= Akhilesh =

Akhilesh is a given name. Notable people with the name include:

- Akhilesh Das (1961–2017), educationist, professor, Indian politician and philanthropist
- Akhilesh K. Gaharwar (born 1982), Indian academic and Professor at Texas A&M University
- Akhilesh Jaiswal (born 1986), Indian film director and screenwriter
- Akhilesh Reddy, British physician-scientist at the Francis Crick Institute in London
- Akhilesh Sahani (born 1994), Indian cricketer
- Akhilesh Prasad Singh (born 1962), Indian politician and former member of parliament of the 14th Lok Sabha
- Akhilesh Pratap Singh, Indian politician and a member of the 16th Legislative Assembly of Uttar Pradesh
- Akhilesh Pati Tripathi, Indian politician belonging to Aam Aadmi Party
- Akhilesh Kumar Tyagi (born 1956), Indian plant biologist and the director of National Institute of Plant Genome Research
- Akhilesh Yadav (born 1973), Indian politician and the current president of the Samajwadi Party

== See also ==
- Dr. Akhilesh Das Gupta Institute of Technology and Management in New Delhi, India
- Dr. Akhilesh Das Gupta Stadium, multi-purpose stadium in the campus of Babu Banarasi Das University, Lucknow, India
- Akhil (disambiguation)
- Akhilesh Gunji (freedomfighter)
