= Neelam Karwariya =

Indian politician (1969–2024)

Neelam Karwariya (2 July 1969 – 26 September 2024) was an Indian politician of the Bharatiya Janata Party. She won the 2017 Uttar Pradesh Legislative Assembly election from Meja, Allahabad and was a member of the 17th Uttar Pradesh Legislative Assembly.

== Career ==
When she started campaigning for the elections, her opponents called her an outsider and this prompted her to start living in the village. She received 67,807 votes while her nearest rival, a candidate of the Samajwadi Party obtained 47,964 votes.

== Personal life and death ==
She was married to former BJP's MLA Udaybhan Karwariya and they had three children together, two daughters Samridhi Karwariya, Sakshi Karwariya and a son Saksham Karwariya.

Karwariya died in Hyderabad on 26 September 2024, at the age of 55.
