= 1991 Uttar Pradesh Legislative Assembly election =

1991 Uttar Pradesh legislative assembly election
- 21 May 1991

All 425 seats of Uttar Pradesh Legislative Assembly 213 seats needed for a majority
- Turnout: 57.13%
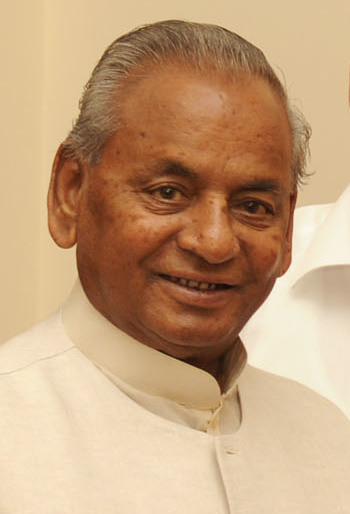

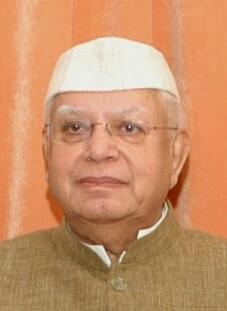

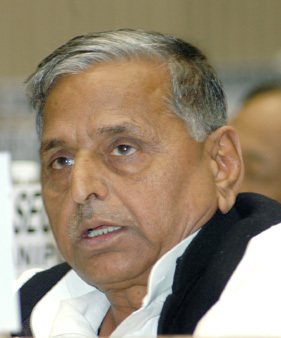

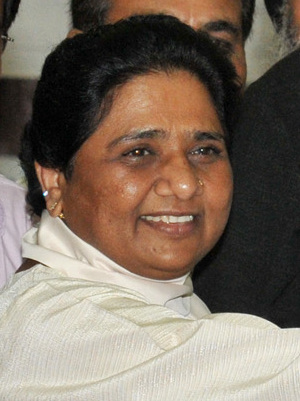
	Majority party	Minority party	Third party
		JD
Leader	Kalyan Singh		Narayan Dutt Tiwari
Party	BJP	JD	INC
Leader's seat	Atrauli		Haldwani
Last election	57	208	94
Seats won	221	92	46
Seat change	▲164	▼116	▼48
Popular vote	11,770,214	7,051,639	6,480,753
Percentage	31.45%	18.84%	17.59%
Swing	▲19.84 pp	▼10.87 pp	▼10.58 pp
	Fourth party	Fifth party	Sixth party
			SS
Leader	Mulayam Singh Yadav	Mayawati	Pawan Pandey
Party	JP	BSP	SS
Leader's seat	Jaswantnagar, Nidhauli Kalan Assembly constituency and Tilhar	Bilsi [Lost]	Akbarpur
Last election	1	13	New
Seats won	34	12	1
Seat change	▲33	▼1	New
Popular vote	4,687,418	3,532,683	45,426
Percentage	12.52%	9.44%	0.12%
Swing	▲11.78 pp	▲0.04 pp	New
Chief Minister before election
President's Rule
Elected Chief Minister
Kalyan Singh
BJP

Legislative Assembly elections were held in Uttar Pradesh on 20 May 1991. The Bharatiya Janata Party became the largest party, winning 221 of the 425 seats.

== Results ==
Party	Seats			Vote	
Party	Contested	Won	+/-	%	+/-
Bharatiya Janata Party (BJP)	415	221	▲164	31.45	▲19.84
Janata Dal (JD)	374	92	▼116	18.84	▼10.87
Indian National Congress (INC)	413	46	▼48	17.32	▼10.58
Janata Party (JP)	399	34	▲33	12.52	▲11.78
Bahujan Samaj Party (BSP)	386	12	▼1	9.44	▲0.03
Communist Party of India (CPI)	44	4	▼2	1.04	▼0.52
Communist Party of India (Marxist) (CPM)	14	1	▼1	0.32	▼0.05
Shiv Sena (SHS)	14	1	▲1	0.12	▲0.12
Shoshit Samaj Dal (SSD)	21	1	Steady	0.11	▼0.07
Independents	5007	7	▼33	7.44	▼8.02
Total		419			

=== Elected members ===
Constituency		Winner			Runner-up			Margin
#	Name	Candidate	Party	Votes	Candidate	Party	Votes	Margin
Uttarkashi district
1	Uttarkashi (SC)	Gyan Chand	BJP	30707	Nathi Lal Shah	INC	19199	11508
Tehri Garhwal district
2	Tehri	Lakhiram Joshi	BJP	21449	Abbal Singh Bisht	INC	17631	3818
3	Devprayag	Matbar Singh Kandari	BJP	28872	Dharam Singh Bhandari	INC	12677	16195
Chamoli district
4	Lansdowne	Bharat Singh Rawat	INC	20528	Mohan Singh Rawat	BJP	20050	478
5	Pauri	Harak Singh Rawat	BJP	31977	Pushkar Singh Rathaun	INC	21185	10792
Chamoli district
6	Karnaprayag	Ramesh Pokhriyal	BJP	29913	Shivanand Nautiyal	INC	26137	3776
7	Badri–Kedar	Kedar Singh Phonia	BJP	33807	Kunwar Singh Negi	INC	27548	6259
Pithoragarh district
8	Didihat	Lilaram Sharma	INC	24534	Narayan Singh Bhainsora	BJP	17112	7422
9	Pithoragarh	Krishna Chandra Punetha	BJP	31806	Mahendra Singh Mahra	INC	26697	5109
Almora district
10	Almora	Puran Chandra Sharma	BJP	30745	Saraswati Tiwari	INC	23849	6896
11	Bageshwar (SC)	Puran Chandra	BJP	28204	Gopal Ram Das	INC	21004	7200
12	Ranikhet	Bachi Singh Rawat	BJP	27815	Pooran Singh	INC	23674	4141
Nainital district
13	Nainital	Banshidhar Bhagat	BJP	32215	Sher Singh Nauliya	INC	19146	13069
14	Khatima	Lakhan Singh	BJP	30966	Yashpal Arya	INC	29211	1755
15	Haldwani	Narayan Datt Tiwari	INC	46614	Tilak Raj Behar	BJP	43410	3204
16	Kashipur	Rajeev Kumar	BJP	34734	K. C. Singh Baba	JD	33431	1303
Bijnor district
17	Seohara	Mahaveer Singh	BJP	51412	Anwar	JD	31674	19738
18	Dhampur	Rajendra Singh	BJP	62048	Buniyad Ali	JD	35397	26651
19	Afzalgarh	Indra Dev Singh	BJP	45467	Salman	BSP	25231	20236
20	Nagina (SC)	Om Prakash	BJP	41744	Sarjeet Singh	BSP	19255	22489
21	Najibabad (SC)	Rajendra	BJP	34730	Tilak Ram	CPI	18901	15829
22	Bijnor	Mahendra Pal Singh	BJP	67009	Gazfar (Raja)	BSP	51349	15660
23	Chandpur	Amar Singh	BJP	58275	Amruddin	BSP	41436	16839
Moradabad district
24	Kanth	Thakur Pal Singh	BJP	26523	Rajesh Kumar	JD	26261	262
25	Amroha	Pratap Singh	BJP	44923	Mohammad Hayat	JD	30207	14716
26	Hasanpur	Tula Ram Saini	BJP	38989	Rahat Mahmood	JD	24482	14507
27	Gangeshwari (SC)	Preetam Singh	BJP	28979	Jagram Singh	JD	27655	1324
28	Sambhal	Iqbal Mehmood	JD	39091	Vijay Tyagi	BJP	35810	3281
29	Bahjoi	Brijendra Pal Singh	INC	25998	Satendra Singh	BJP	22844	3154
30	Chandausi (SC)	Gulabo Devi	BJP	29285	Yad Ram	JD	23029	6256
31	Kundarki	Akbar Husain	JD	41390	Reena Kumari	INC	34959	6431
32	Moradabad West	J. P. Singh	BJP	40218	Samar Pal Singh	JD	29752	10466
33	Moradabad	Zahid Husain	JD	48204	Shakuntala	BJP	28568	19636
34	Moradabad Rural	Mohammad Rizwanulhaq	JD	31787	Shiv Kumar Singh	BJP	26570	5217
35	Thakurdwara	Kunwar Sarvesh Singh	BJP	60276	Mohammed Ulla Khan	SJP	26040	34236
Rampur district
36	Suar	Shiv Bahadur Saxena	BJP	44138	Nisar Hussain	INC	32609	11529
37	Rampur	Azam Khan	JP	27318	Yogesh Chandra Arora	BJP	24684	2634
38	Bilaspur	Jwala Prasad	BJP	29074	Gyani Harinder Singh	JD	24016	5058
39	Shahabad (SC)	Swami Parmanand Dandi	BJP	33679	Chandra Pal Singh	INC	26610	7069
Budaun district
40	Bisauli	Krishna Vir Singh	JD	24812	Yogendra Kumar	INC	24503	309
41	Gunnaur	Ramkhiladi Yadav	JD	25344	Premwati	SJP	17561	7783
42	Sahaswan	Omkar Yadav	JD	42416	Meer Mazhar Ali	SJP	20307	22109
43	Bilsi (SC)	Bhola Shanker Maurya	INC	31546	Hira Lal	BJP	31430	116
44	Badaun	Krishan Swaroop	BJP	41123	Khalid Parwez	JD	32273	8850
45	Usehat	Banwari Singh	SJP	24340	Brij Pal Singh	BJP	24290	50
46	Binawar	Ram Sewak	BJP	46381	Abrar Ahmed	INC	15885	30496
47	Dataganj	Avnish Kumar Singh	BJP	30084	Santosh Kumari Pathak	INC	23939	6145
Bareilly district
48	Aonla	Shyam Bihari Singh	BJP	26647	Mahipal Singh	JD	19687	6960
49	Sunha	Rameshwar Nath Choubey	INC	26709	Kunwar Sarvaraj Singh	JD	23974	2735
50	Faridpur (SC)	Nand Ram	BJP	30651	Siya Ram Sagar	SJP	27038	3613
51	Bareilly Cantonment	Islam Sabir	INC	36703	Radheshyam	BJP	33826	2877
52	Bareilly City	Dinesh Johri	BJP	57358	Jaswant Prasad	INC	33406	23952
53	Nawabganj	Bhagwat Saran Gangwar	BJP	46745	Digvijay Gangwar	INC	31293	15452
54	Bhojipura	Kunwar Subhash Patel	BJP	37228	Mohammed Farooq	JP	28345	8883
55	Kawar	Kunwar Surendra Pratap Singh	BJP	33925	Bhupendra Nath Sharma	INC	14522	19403
56	Baheri	Harish Chandra Gangwar	BJP	51247	Manzoor Ahmed	SJP	21179	30068
Pilibhit district
57	Pilibhit	Balkrishna Gupta	BJP	47617	Riaz Ahmed	INC	27639	19978
58	Barkhera (SC)	Kishan Lal	BJP	31143	Ram Ashrey Lal	SJP	14227	16916
59	Bisalpur	Agys Ramsaran Verma	BJP	32478	Tej Bahadur	Ind	19291	13187
60	Puranpur	Pramod Kumar	BJP	26471	Vinod Kumar	JD	25849	622
Shahjahanpur district
61	Powayan (SC)	Net Ram	BJP	28624	Chetram	INC	20575	8049
62	Nigohi	Kobid Kumar Singh	BJP	33000	Ahibran	INC	23177	9823
63	Tilhar	Satyapal Yadav	JD	31818	Surendra Vikram	INC	20331	11487
64	Jalalabad	Ram Murti Singh	SJP	26665	Udaiveer Singh	INC	26228	237
65	Dadraul	Devendra Pal Singh	JD	32709	Ram Avtar	INC	25189	7520
66	Shahjahanpur	Suresh Kumar Khanna	BJP	50579	Mohaammed Iqbal	JD	22342	28237
Lakhimpur Kheri district
67	Mohammdi (SC)	Banshi Dhar Raj	INC	32005	Chhotey Lal	BJP	27283	4722
68	Haiderabad (SC)	Ram Kumar	BJP	23318	Balbir Singh	INC	18635	4683
69	Palia (SC)	Ram Saran	JD	19477	Bhagwan Din	BJP	17709	1768
70	Lakhimpur	Ram Gopal	BJP	37771	Zafar Ali Naqvi	INC	31080	6691
71	Sri Nagar	Taj Narain Trivedi	INC	25858	Dhirendra Bahadur Singh	JP	19709	6149
72	Nighasan	Nirvendra Mishra	Ind	27704	Ram Ashrey	BJP	26221	1483
73	Dhaurahra	Bala Prasad Awasthi	BJP	26478	Jagannath Prasad	Ind	22862	3616
Sitapur district
74	Behta	Kishorei Lal	BJP	22558	Sipahi Lal Shukla	INC	17381	5177
75	Biswan	Padma Seth	INC	25443	Ram Singh Chauhan	BJP	22973	2470
76	Mahmoodabad	Narendra Singh Verma	BJP	38319	Ammar Rizvi	INC	34760	3559
77	Sidhauli (SC)	Shyam Lal Rawat	SJP	27208	Ram Karan	BJP	23189	4019
78	Laharpur	Anil Kumar Verma	BJP	33726	Buniyad Hussain Ansari	SJP	26671	7055
79	Sitapur	Rajendra Kumar Gupta	BJP	31394	Om Prakash Gupta	SJP	19067	12327
80	Hargaon (SC)	Daulat Ram	BJP	24843	Paragi Lal	INC	23097	1746
81	Misrikh	Ram Ratan Singh	INC	27346	Anoop Kumar Gupta	SJP	21357	5989
82	Machhrehta (SC)	Ram Krishan	INC	24406	Baba Lal Das	BJP	19485	4921
Hardoi district
83	Beniganj (SC)	Ram Pal	INC	30446	Buddha Lal	BJP	29118	1328
84	Sandila	Mahavir Singh	BJP	29175	Kusdhesiya Begum	INC	25438	3737
85	Ahirori (SC)	Parmai Lal	SJP	20565	Ram Sewak	BJP	19950	615
86	Hardoi	Naresh Agarwal	INC	30370	Mahesh Nath Mahendra	BJP	29353	1017
87	Bawan (SC)	Daya Ram Verma	BJP	23759	Chhote Lal	BSP	17979	5780
88	Pihani	Khalid Gauri	INC	26644	Ram Bali Mishra	BJP	18077	8567
89	Shahabad	Babu Khan	Ind	22894	Ganga Singh Chauhan	BJP	19446	3448
90	Bilgram	Ganga Bhakt Singh	BJP	22842	Vishram Singh	SJP	21567	1275
91	Mallawan	Ram Asray Verma	JD	38672	Dharam Mishra	INC	20355	18137
Unnao district
92	Bangarmau	Gopi Nath Dixit	INC	27672	Ashok Kumar Singh	SJP	24575	3097
93	Safipur (SC)	Sunder Lal	JD	21577	Babu Lal	BJP	20861	716
94	Unnao	Shiv Pal Singh	BJP	33733	Manohar Pal	JD	27351	6382
95	Hadha	Ganga Bux Singh	INC	25996	Sunder Singh Lodhi	BJP	22620	3376
96	Bhagwantnagar	Bhagwati Singh Visharad	INC	23183	Dewaki Nandan	BJP	21420	1763
97	Purwa	Hriday Narayan Dikshit	SJP	21513	Bhagoley	BJP	20374	1139
98	Hasanganj (SC)	Mast Ram	BJP	27048	Ram Khelawan	BSP	14446	12602
Lucknow district
99	Malihabad (SC)	Ashok Kumar	SJP	22442	Sukh Lal	BJP	18977	3465
100	Mohana	Gomti Prasad	BJP	27162	Chandra Shekhar Trivedi	SJP	18371	8791
101	Lucknow East	Bhagwati Prasad Shukla	BJP	36605	Swaroop Kumar Baxi	INC	12193	24412
102	Lucknow West	Ram Kumar Shukla	BJP	41537	Arun Shankar	JP	26714	14823
103	Lucknow Central	Basant Lal Gupta	BJP	43744	Musheer Ahmed Lari	SJP	18644	25100
104	Lucknow Cantonment	Satish Bhatia	BJP	32159	Premwari Tiwari	INC	15803	16356
105	Sarojini Nagar	Vijay Kumar Tripathi	INC	21687	Shyam Kishore Yadav	JP	19093	2594
106	Mohanlalganj (SC)	Sant Bux Rawat	SJP	16000	Mohan Lal	BJP	12580	3420
Raebareli district
107	Bachhrawan (SC)	Shiv Darshan	INC	21085	Rajaram Tyagi	BJP	20666	419
108	Tiloi	Hazi Mohammed Wasim	INC	28598	Ram Gopal Tripathi	BJP	26781	1817
109	Raebareli	Ashok Singh	JD	34231	Ram Naresh Yadav	SJP	24582	9649
110	Sataon	Kamal Nayan Verma	INC	21413	Satya Prakash Pandey	BJP	18661	2752
111	Sareni	Girish Narain Pandey	BJP	22795	Indresh Vikram Singh	INC	22285	510
112	Dalmau	Har Narain Singh	INC	23228	Gajdhar Singh	SJP	19268	3960
113	Salon (SC)	Shiv Bala Pasi	INC	30004	Dal Bahadur	BJP	19571	10433
Pratapgarh district
114	Kunda	Shiv Narain Mishra	BJP	21197	Niaz Hasan	INC	19332	1865
115	Bihar (SC)	Suresh Bharti	BJP	19236	Suresh Chandra	JD	17565	1671
116	Rampur Khas	Pramod Tiwari	INC	26905	Raja Ram Pandey	JD	18784	8121
117	Garwara	Ramesh Bahadur Singh	BJP	27253	Brijnath Pal	JD	19621	7632
118	Pratapgarh	Brijesh Kumar Sharma	BJP	26113	Ajit Pratap Singh	JD	23097	3016
119	Birapur	Shyad Ali	JD	30388	Laxminarayan Pandey	BJP	30016	372
120	Patti	Shiva Kant	BJP	27137	Shakti Singh	JD	23802	3335
Sultanpur district
121	Amethi	Haricharan Yadav	INC	33176	Jamuna Prasad Mishra	BJP	17597	15579
122	Gauriganj	Tej Bhan Singh	BJP	24606	Rajpati Devi	INC	24417	189
123	Jagdishpur (SC)	Ram Sewak	INC	19874	Jagroop Deshbandhu	BJP	17751	2123
124	Isauli	Om Prakash Pandey	BJP	24203	Indra Bhadra	JD	18160	6043
125	Sultanpur	Ram Piyare Shukla	BJP	32748	Jafar	SJP	23275	9473
126	Jaisinghpur	Arjun	BJP	26777	Suryabhan Singh	SJP	13945	12832
127	Chanda	Arun Pratap Singh	BJP	29435	Subhash Chandra Tripathi	INC	11975	17460
128	Kadipur (SC)	Ram Chander	BJP	31040	Bhageloo Ram	BSP	19111	11929
Ayodhya district
129	Katehari	Anil Kumar Tewari	BJP	28069	Ram Deo Verma	BSP	20751	7858
130	Akbarpur	Pawan Pandey	SS	37616	Ram Achal Rajbhar	BSP	21719	15897
131	Jalalpur	Ram Lakhan	BSP	27607	Sher Bahadur	INC	20784	6823
132	Jahangirganj (SC)	Triveni	BJP	27375	Sukhu Prasad	BSP	18676	8699
133	Tanda	Lalji Verma	JD	40614	Sheo Pujan Verma	BJP	26983	13631
134	Ayodhya	Lallu Singh	BJP	49206	Jai Shankar Pandey	SJP	18806	30400
135	Bikapur	Sant Shri Ram Dwivedi	BJP	23895	Sitaram Nishad	INC	20338	3557
136	Milkipur	Mathura Prasad Tewari	BJP	27594	Kamalasan Pandey	CPI	27179	415
137	Sohawal (SC)	Ramu Priyadarshi	BJP	31690	Avdhesh Prasad	SJP	22047	9643
138	Rudauli	Ram Dev Acharya	BJP	32222	Ishtiyak	SJP	20423	11799
Barabanki district
139	Dariyabad (SC)	Radhey Shyam	JP	30685	Rajeev Kumar Singh	INC	27569	3116
140	Siddhaur	Baij Nath Rawat	BJP	28470	Ratan Lal	SJP	19065	9405
141	Haidergarh	Surendra Nath	INC	26247	Sunder Lal Dixit	BJP	23925	2322
142	Masauli	Beni Prasad Verma	SJP	35132	Shyam Lal Yadav	BSP	24187	10945
143	Nawabganj	Chotey Lal	SJP	22499	Sunder Lal Yadav	BJP	19555	2944
144	Fatehpur (SC)	Hardeo Singh	SJP	27043	Muneshwar Kureel	BJP	23557	3486
145	Ramnagar	Fareed Mahfooz Kidwai	SJP	23192	Raj Laxmi Verma	BJP	22401	791
Bahraich district
146	Kaiserganj	Rudendar Vikram Singh	BJP	38360	Ram Tej Yadav	SJP	32864	5496
147	Fakharpur	Maynkar Singh	BJP	48242	Vasudev Singh	SJP	21650	26592
148	Mahasi	Neelam Singh	BJP	34322	Dilip Kumar Verma	SJP	17178	17144
149	Nanpara	Jai Shankar Singh	BJP	49446	Fazlur Rehman Ansari	BSP	26208	23238
150	Charda (SC)	Akshaibar Lal	BJP	27257	Sabbir Ahmed	Ind	25900	1357
151	Bhinga	Chander Mani Kant Singh	BJP	37488	Khurshid Ahmed	Ind	16857	20631
152	Bahraich	Brij Raj Tripathi	BJP	28104	Fasiur Rahman	SJP	26358	1746
153	Ikauna (SC)	Vishun Dayal	BJP	35106	Ram Sagar Rao	INC	11546	23560
Balrampur district
154	Gainsari	Vindu Lal	BJP	38041	Sheo Pratap Yadav	SJP	18218	19823
155	Tulsipur	Kamlesh Kumar	BJP	37386	Rizwan Zaheer Khan	SJP	32451	4935
156	Balrampur	Hanumant Singh	BJP	51855	Gajendra Kumar	INC	12552	39303
157	Utraula	Samiulla	JD	48300	Vishwanath Prasad	BJP	45915	2385
158	Sadullah Nagar	Ram Pratap Singh	BJP	42279	Mohammad Umar	INC	27665	14614
Gonda district
159	Mankapur (SC)	Chedi Lal	BJP	37876	Ram Vishnu	INC	27894	9982
160	Mujehna	Ghanshyam Shukla	BJP	42666	Rampal Singh	INC	22212	20454
161	Gonda	Tulsi Das	BJP	41601	Raghuraj Prasad Upadhyay	INC	16215	25386
162	Katra Bazar	Ram Singh	BJP	57445	Muralidhar Munim	INC	15975	41470
163	Colonelganj	Ajai Pratap Singh	BJP	55921	Umeshwar Pratap Singh	INC	17056	38865
164	Dixir (SC)	Ramapati Shastri	BJP	41943	Baboo Lal	INC	23979	17964
Basti district
165	Harraiya	Jagdamba Singh	BJP	36594	Anil	JD	26097	10497
166	Kaptanganj	Krishan Kikar Singh	Ind	34474	Ram Prasad Chaudhary	SJP	19170	15304
167	Nagar East (SC)	Bed Prakash	BJP	25339	Girdhari Lal	JD	21221	4118
168	Basti	Lakshameshwar Singh	JD	28385	Vijaysen Singh	BJP	25784	2601
169	Ramnagar	Ram Lalit	JD	27987	Parmatma Prasad Singh	INC	21474	6513
Siddharthnagar district
170	Domariyaganj	Prem Prakash	BJP	37198	Taufik Ahmed	INC	35636	1562
171	Itwa	Mohammed Muqueem	INC	40790	Soyembar Chaudhari	BJP	38353	2437
172	Shohratgarh	Shiv Lal Mittal	BJP	37231	Kamla Sahani	INC	26047	11274
173	Naugarh	Dhanraj Yadav	BJP	43392	Ishwar Chandra	INC	25326	18066
174	Bansi	Jai Pratap Singh	Ind	28943	Parmatma Prasad Pandey	BJP	28574	369
175	Khesraha	Diwaker Vikram Singh	JD	28968	Chandra Shekhar	INC	24239	4729
Basti district
176	Menhdawal	Chandra Shekhar Singh	BJP	27746	Mohammed Navi Khan	JD	23013	4733
177	Khalilabad	Ram Charitar	BJP	25699	Ram Lakhan	JD	24879	820
178	Hainsarbazar (SC)	Sriram Chauhan	BJP	25852	Lal Mani Prasad	BSP	23872	1980
Gorakhpur district
179	Bansgaon (SC)	Yadhu Nath	BJP	24821	Mukh Lal	BSP	18052	6769
180	Dhuriapar	Markandey Chand	JD	28624	Shailendra Pratap Shahi	BJP	25749	2875
181	Chillupar	Hari Shankar Tiwari	INC	47530	Shyam Lal Yadav	BSP	32303	15227
182	Kauriram	Lal Chand Nishad	INC	22632	Gauri Devi	JD	19057	3575
183	Mundera Bazar (SC)	Sharda Devi	JD	21489	Bechan Ram	BJP	17308	4181
184	Pipraich	Lallan Prasad Tripathi	BJP	35698	Kedar Nath Singh	JD	21253	14445
185	Gorakhpur Urban	Shiv Pratap Shukla	BJP	39897	Jafar Amin	JD	14462	25435
186	Maniram	Om Prakash Paswan	BJP	66870	Shambhu Sharan	JD	20737	46133
187	Sahajanwa	Tarkeshwar	BJP	26597	Prabha Rawat	JD	19662	6935
Maharajganj district
188	Paniyara	Fateh Bahadur Singh	INC	42907	Parshuram	JD	19452	23455
189	Pharenda	Shyam Narayan Tiwari	INC	26325	Tulsi Ram Gaur	BJP	25017	1308
190	Laxmipur	Akhilesh	JP	32204	Amarmani Tripathi	INC	25636	6568
191	Siswa	Shivender Singh	INC	38003	Uday Bhan Mall	BJP	28990	9013
192	Maharajganj (SC)	Ram Pyare Azad	BJP	38529	Sri Pati	JD	25988	12541
193	Shyamdeurawa	Gyanender	BJP	37281	Ram Adhar	JD	37252	29
Deoria district
194	Naurangia (SC)	Deep Lal Bharti	BJP	34767	Adya Prasad	JD	16011	18756
195	Ramkola	Ambika Singh	BJP	35908	Virendra Bahadur Singh	JD	23850	12058
196	Hata (SC)	Ramapati Urf Ramakant	BJP	39003	Ram Nakshatra	JD	30946	8057
197	Padrauna	Surendra Shukla	BJP	45675	Asager	CPI	23495	22180
198	Seorahi	Nand Kishor Mishra	BJP	20894	Ram Adhar Kushwaha	Ind	16593	4301
199	Fazilnagar	Vishwa Nath	JD	41948	Ganga Singh	BJP	36728	5220
200	Kasia	Surya Pratap Shahi	BJP	45375	Brahma Shankar	JD	38634	6741
201	Gauri Bazar	Sri Niwas	BJP	26964	Nand Kishore Singh	JD	23653	3311
202	Rudrapur	Jai Prakash Nishad	BJP	18539	Ram Shankar Rajbhar	JD	14365	4174
203	Deoria	Ravindra Pratap Mall	BJP	31097	Subhash Chandra Srivastava	JD	30303	794
204	Bhatpar Rani	Harivansh Sahai	JD	36064	Kameshwar Upadhyay	INC	35743	321
205	Salempur	Swaminath Yadav	JD	26143	Anirudh Mishra	BJP	21420	4723
206	Barhaj	Durga Prasad Mishra	BJP	28577	Ram Naresh Prasad	JD	19124	9453
Mau district
207	Nathupur	Amaresh Chand	INC	19159	Rajendra	BSP	17258	1901
208	Ghosi	Phagu Chauhan	JD	36380	Subhash	INC	21864	14516
Azamgarh district
209	Sagri	Barkhu Ram Verma	BSP	25676	Panchanan Rai	INC	19891	5785
210	Gopalpur	Dal Singar	JD	26371	Shamim	BSP	16572	9799
211	Azamgarh	Durga Prasad Yadav	JD	35652	Hari Shanker	BJP	24391	11261
212	Nizamabad	Angad Yadav	BSP	34770	Masood	JD	27030	7740
213	Atrauliya	Balram Yadav	SJP	35992	Krishna Kant Chaturvedi	BJP	19245	16747
214	Phoolpur	Ramakant Yadav	SJP	27443	Narendra Kumar	BJP	18613	8830
215	Saraimir (SC)	Pati Raj	BJP	21826	Jaganhu Ram	JD	21799	27
216	Mehnagar (SC)	Kalpnath Paswan	BJP	23553	Ram Jag	CPM	20636	2917
217	Lalganj	Sukhdev Rajbhar	BSP	25966	Narender	BJP	25942	24
218	Mubarakpur	A. Salam	JD	31874	Harendra	BJP	22554	9320
Mau district
219	Muhammadabad-Gohna	Shriram Sonkar	BJP	24854	Ramdeo	CPI	20402	4452
220	Mau	Imitiyaz Ahmad	CPI	27597	Mukhtar Abbas	BJP	27464	133
Ballia district
221	Rasara (SC)	Ghurabu	JD	20502	Ram Bachan	INC	19910	592
222	Siar	Hari Narain	BJP	24506	Shardanand Anchal	SJP	23069	1437
223	Chilkahar	Ram Govind Chaudhary	SJP	21370	Chhotey Lal	BSP	17838	3532
224	Sikanderpur	Markandey	INC	31286	Raj Dhari	SJP	20586	10700
225	Bansdih	Bacha Pathak	INC	40856	Vijaylaxmi	SJP	32668	8188
226	Doaba	Bharat	SJP	36146	Vikram	INC	24345	11801
227	Ballia	Vikramaditya Pandey	SJP	28615	Kashi Nath	INC	26607	2008
228	Kopachit	Sudhir	INC	25662	Gauri Shankar Bhaiya	SJP	25012	650
Ghazipur district
229	Zahoorabad	Surendra Singh	Samajwadi Janata Dal	20181	Ganesh	BJP	19571	610
230	Mohammadabad	Afzal Ansari	CPI	53447	Vijayshankar Rai	BJP	44184	9263
231	Dildarnagar	Om Prakash	SJP	45724	Sacchidanand	BJP	44069	1655
232	Zamania	Sharda Chauhan	BJP	24402	Ravindra Yadav	JD	22045	2357
233	Ghazipur	Udai Pratap	BJP	26280	Hasan Mohammed Khan Warsi	JD	23808	2472
234	Jakhanian (SC)	Girdhari	JD	17876	Ram Dular	BJP	15752	2124
235	Sadat (SC)	Gama Ram Shashtri	JD	23949	Deep Chand	BJP	16824	7125
236	Saidpur	Mahendra Nath Pandey	BJP	27102	Ranjit	JD	21072	6030
Varanasi district
237	Dhanapur	Kailash Nath Yadav	JD	24795	Surender Kumar	BJP	21272	3523
238	Chandauli (SC)	Shiv Pujan Ram	BJP	26604	Deenanath Bhaskar	BSP	26366	238
239	Chakia (SC)	Rajesh Kumar	BJP	24044	Ram Krit	BSP	14249	9795
240	Mughalsarai	Chabbu	BJP	25224	Ram Kishan	SJP	18834	6390
241	Varanasi Cantonment	Jyotsana Srivastava	BJP	31305	Athat Jamal Lari	JD	26209	5096
242	Varanasi South	Shyamdev Roy Chaudhari	BJP	57829	Vijay Dubey	JD	13662	44167
243	Varanasi North	Amar Nath Yadav	BJP	48985	Mohd Swaleh Ansari	INC	35411	13574
244	Chiraigaon	Maya Shankar Pathak	BJP	29469	Chandra Shekhar	JD	27426	2043
245	Kolasla	Udal	CPI	33509	Purnmasi	BJP	18907	14602
246	Gangapur	Deena Nath Yadav	CPI	41899	Dan Bahadur Singh	Ind	19112	22787
247	Aurai	Yogesh Chander	JD	33339	Rangnath	BJP	31771	1768
248	Gyanpur	Lal Chand Pande	BJP	39272	Ram Prasad Bind	JD	25675	13597
249	Bhadohi (SC)	Purnmasi Pankaj	BJP	29016	Moolchand	JD	26910	2106
Jaunpur district
250	Barsathi	Raghu Raj	BJP	23504	Sarvjeet Patel	JD	19899	3605
251	Mariyahu	Kishori Lal	JD	28566	Jagannath Rao	BJP	17565	11001
252	Kerakat (SC)	Somaroo Ram	BJP	23176	Shyamlal	JD	20919	2257
253	Bayalsi	Umanath Singh	BJP	22818	Bilku	BSP	15702	7116
254	Jaunpur	Lal Chand	JD	23849	Sohan Lal Maurya	BJP	23346	503
255	Rari	Mirza Sultan Raza	JD	28659	Arun Kumar Singh	INC	19851	8808
256	Shahganj (SC)	Ram Paras Rajak	BJP	27862	Ram Dawar	BSP	16764	11098
257	Khutahan	Umakant Yadav	BSP	40797	Ram Akbal Singh	BJP	19191	21606
258	Garwara	Ran Narain Bind	JD	21859	Vidya Shankar Tiwari	BJP	17609	4250
259	Machhlishahr	Jwala Prasad Yadav	JD	25535	Bindra Prasad	BSP	22197	3338
Sonbhadra district
260	Duddhi (SC)	Vijai Singh	JD	27641	Chatur Behari	BJP	17764	9877
261	Robertsganj (SC)	Teerath Raj	BJP	25699	Satya Narain	BSP	8761	16938
Mirzapur district
262	Rajgarh	Rajendra	JD	24220	Gulab Singh	BJP	23280	940
263	Chunar	Yadunath Singh	JD	31929	Ram Bulawan	BJP	23443	8486
264	Majhawan	Bhagawat	BSP	20979	Bhola Nath	JD	19127	1852
265	Mirzapur	Sarjeet Singh Dang	BJP	33669	Shiv Bahadur	JD	20103	13566
266	Chhanbey (SC)	Dulare Lal	JD	31140	Shri Ram	BSP	15359	15781
Prayagraj district
267	Meja (SC)	Vishram Das	JD	41466	Ram Naresh Kashyap	BJP	15217	26249
268	Karachhana	Rewati Raman Singh	JD	35174	Nandlal Patel	BSP	17864	17310
269	Bara	Ram Sewak Singh	BSP	25885	Krishna Murari Kapuriha	BJP	19330	6555
270	Jhunsi	Mahendra Pratap Singh	JD	24932	Jawahar Yadav	JP	23191	1741
271	Handia	Brij Bhan Yadav	JD	38532	Shitla Prasad Bind	BSP	22302	16230
272	Pratappur	Vikram Jeet Maurya	JD	31167	Jawahar Lal Diwakar	BSP	19293	11874
273	Soraon	Bhola Singh	JD	25550	Hiramani Patel	BSP	18837	6713
274	Nawabganj	Prabha Shanker Pandey	BJP	21846	Abdul Rauf	JD	19469	2377
275	Prayagraj North	Narendra Kumar Singh Gaur	BJP	26112	Anugrah Narain Singh	JD	17439	8673
276	Prayagraj South	Keshari Nath Tripathi	BJP	30417	Ramji Kesharwani	JD	12784	17633
277	Prayagraj West	Atiq Ahmed	Ind	36424	Ram Chandra Jaiswal	BJP	20681	15743
278	Chail (SC)	Dinesh Chandra Sonkar	JD	19243	Shivdani	BJP	17403	1840
279	Manjhanpur (SC)	Bhagwant Prasad	JD	21671	Chunnilal Chaudhari	BJP	18361	3310
280	Sirathu (SC)	Bhagirathi	JD	20792	Desh Raj	BJP	16637	4155
Fatehpur district
281	Khaga	Krishna Kumar	JD	24383	Veer Abhimanyu Singh	JP	19518	4865
282	Kishunpur (SC)	Jageshwar	JD	32966	Udai Raj	BSP	11509	21457
283	Haswa	Om Prakash	JD	43133	Amarnath Singh	INC	7861	35272
284	Fatehpur	Syed Qasim Hasan	JD	43210	Radhe Shyam Gupta	BJP	18429	24781
285	Jahanabad	Chattra Pal Verma	JD	38224	Shreedhar Shukla	BJP	15436	22788
286	Bindki	Abhimanyu Singh	JD	34727	Amarjeet Singh	BJP	17911	16816
Kanpur Nagar district
287	Arya Nagar	Satyadev Pachauri	BJP	29964	Mohammed Suleman	AIML	19859	10105
288	Sishamau (SC)	Rakesh Sonker	BJP	36576	Deen Dayal	INC	14820	21756
289	Generalganj	Neeraj Chaturvedi	BJP	28816	Sitaram Dixit	INC	13958	24858
290	Kanpur Cantonment	Satish Mahana	BJP	33897	Shyam Mishra	INC	17927	15970
291	Govindnagar	Bal Chandra Misra	BJP	56519	Ajay Kapoor	INC	32207	24312
292	Kalyanpur	Prem Lata Katiyar	BJP	45958	Ragendra Swaroop	INC	21206	24752
293	Sarsaul	Jagram Singh Yadav	SJP	21704	Jauhrilal Trivedi	JD	20373	1331
294	Ghatampur	Shivnath Singh Kushwaha	INC	23813	Rakesh Sachan	JD	18176	5637
Kanpur Dehat district
295	Bhognipur (SC)	Pyare Lal Sankhwar	JD	23005	Satya Prakash Sankhwar	BJP	23005	22162
296	Rajpur	Ramswaroop Verma	SSD (Note: Shoshit Samaj Dal)	27223	Chaudhary Narendra Singh	INC	14363	12860
297	Sarvankhera	Mathura Prasad Pal	JD	24852	Prabhu Dayal Yadav	JP	23561	1291
298	Chaubepur	Som Nath Shukla	BJP	26445	Harikishan	SJP	24442	2003
299	Bilhaur (SC)	Shiv Kumar Beria	SJP	20848	Saunram Bhartiya	BJP	18460	2388
300	Derapur	Devendra Singh	BJP	36188	Ramdas Pal	JP	22419	13769
Etawah district
301	Auraiya	Indra Pal Singh	SJP	27040	Ashok Kumar Sharma	BJP	24164	2876
302	Ajitmal (SC)	Chhakki Lal	BJP	21293	Gauri Shankar	INC	18852	2441
303	Lakhna (SC)	Krishna Kumar	BJP	31770	Gaya Prasad Verma	SJP	28905	2865
304	Etawah	Ashok Dubey	BJP	40851	Jaiveer Singh	SJP	25256	15595
305	Jaswantnagar	Mulayam Singh Yadav	SJP	47765	Darshan Singh	INC	30601	17164
306	Bharthana	Maharaj Singh Yadav	SJP	59582	Shiv Prem Chandra Shakya	BJP	17935	41647
307	Bidhuna	Dhaniram Verma	SJP	31017	Osan Singh	BJP	24545	6472
Farrukhabad district
308	Kannauj (SC)	Banwarilal Dohre	BJP	23169	Kalyan Dohre	JD	23122	47
309	Umarda	Arvind Partap Singh	SJP	31940	Deveshwar Narayan Singh	JD	28496	3444
310	Chhibramau	Kaptan Singh	SJP	33887	Ram Prakash Tripathi	BJP	31088	2799
311	Kamalganj	Urmila Rajput	BJP	40686	Zamauddin	SJP	27757	12929
312	Farrukhabad	Brahm Dutt Dwivedi	BJP	26550	Vimal Prasad Tiwari	INC	18065	8485
313	Kaimganj	Ijhar Alam Khan	JD	21753	Faqire Lal	SJP	17695	4058
314	Mohammdabad	Narender Singh Yadav	INC	59805	Updesh Singh	Ind	16464	43341
Banda district
315	Manikpur (SC)	Mannu Lal Kuril	BJP	22774	Rameshwar Prasad	CPI	17500	5274
316	Karwi	Ram Prasad Singh	CPI	20488	Hiralal Pandey	INC	16628	3860
317	Baberu	Gaya Charan Dinkar	BSP	22295	Ayodhya Singh	BJP	12917	9378
318	Tindwari	Vishambhar Prasad Nishad	BSP	17527	Chandrabhan Singh	JD	15790	1737
319	Banda	Nasimuddin Siddiqui	BSP	23989	Ram Ratan Sharma	BJP	21015	2974
320	Naraini	Ramesh Chandra Dwivedi	BJP	24195	Surendra Pal	JP	20144	4051
Hamirpur district
321	Hamirpur	Shiv Charan Prajapati	BSP	25602	Ashok Singh Chandel	BJP	19126	6476
322	Maudaha	Badshah Singh	BJP	26138	Basiruddin	BSP	18895	7243
323	Rath	Ram Singh	INC	20519	Ramadhar Singh	JD	20302	289
324	Charkhari	Mihi Lal	INC	20716	Chhote Lal	BJP	18955	1761
325	Mahoba	Chhote Lal Mishra	BJP	19520	Arimardan Singh	JD	19363	157
Lalitpur district
326	Mehroni	Puran Singh Bundela	INC	45408	Devendra Kumar Singh	BJP	37819	7589
327	Lalitpur	Arvind Kumar	BJP	28234	Tilak Singh	BSP	17868	10366
Jhansi district
328	Jhansi Nagar	Ravindra Shukla	BJP	43937	Mukhtar Ahmed	INC	18021	25916
329	Babina (SC)	Ratan Lal Ahirwar	BJP	27470	Beni Bai	INC	26144	1326
330	Mauranipur	Pragi Lal Ahirwar	BJP	32058	Biharilal Arya	INC	31962	96
331	Garautha	Ranjeet Singh Judeo	INC	33419	Virendra Singh Niranjan	BJP	28661	4758
Jalaun district
332	Konch (SC)	Bhanu Pratap Singh Verma	BJP	28841	Daya Shankar	JD	16757	12084
333	Orai	Babu Ram Mcom	BJP	34966	Akbar Ali	BSP	19193	15773
334	Kalpi	Sriram Pal	BSP	25652	Chaudhari Shankar Singh	JP	19570	6083
335	Madhogarh	Keshav Singh	BJP	31648	Shiv Ram	BSP	29514	2134
Mainpuri district
336	Bhongaon	Ram Autar Shakya	SJP	32385	Shivraj Singh Chauhan	BJP	31135	1250
337	Kishni (SC)	Rameshwar Dayal Balmiki	SJP	34602	Savitri	BJP	21568	13034
338	Karhal	Babu Ram Yadav	SJP	41895	Sunder Singh Baghel	INC	28524	13371
Firozabad district
339	Shikohabad	Jhaulal Yadav	Ind	20901	Rajesh Kumar	BJP	18656	2245
340	Jasrana	Jaidan Singh	JD	30812	Balvir Singh	SJP	19816	10996
Mainpuri district
341	Ghiror	Gandhrav Singh	BJP	26609	Urmila Devi	SJP	26075	534
342	Mainpuri	Narender Singh	BJP	34014	Kalicharan Yadav	SJP	25479	8535
Etah district
343	Aliganj	Avadh Pal Singh	SJP	32038	Genda Lal	BJP	22411	9627
344	Patiyali	Rajender Singh	BJP	32524	Devender Singh Yadav	INC	27502	5022
345	Sakeet	Suraj Singh Shakya	BJP	31052	Virender Singh Solanki	SJP	26928	4124
346	Soron	Onkar Singh	BJP	26809	Vikram Singh	BSP	16113	10696
347	Kasganj	Net Ram Singh	BJP	32963	Umesh Chander	JD	17217	15746
348	Etah	Pitam Singh	BJP	38227	Attar Singh Yadav	SJP	27367	10860
349	Nidhauli Kalan	Sudhaker Verma	BJP	28930	Anil Kumar Yadav	INC	19195	9735
350	Jalesar (SC)	Madhav	BJP	25368	Ram Khiladi	SJP	17736	7632
Firozabad district
351	Firozabad	Ram Kishan Dadaju	BJP	43138	Raghbar Dayal Verma	JD	31523	11615
Agra district
352	Bah	Raja Mahendra Aridaman Singh	JD	30408	Amar Chand	INC	23215	7193
353	Fatehabad	Vijay Pal Singh	JD	24059	Bijendra Singh Bhati	BJP	13969	10090
Firozabad district
354	Tundla (SC)	Om Prakash Diwakar	JD	20614	Ramesh Chandra Chanchal	SJP	17208	3406
Agra district
355	Etmadpur (SC)	Chandra Bhan Maurya	JD	24940	Ghanshyam Premi	BJP	20518	4422
356	Dayalbagh	Vijay Singh Rana	JD	26834	Chaudhary Udaybhan Singh	BJP	21261	5573
357	Agra Cantonment	Hardwar Dubey	BJP	39436	Shiv Charan Lal Manav	JD	25538	13898
358	Agra East	Satya Prakash Vikal	BJP	46337	Omprakash Jindal	INC	21787	24550
359	Agra West (SC)	Kishan Gopal	BJP	37924	Suresh Chand Soni	JD	17810	20114
360	Kheragarh	Babu Lal Goyal	BJP	35756	Mandaleshwar Singh	JD	34783	973
361	Fatehpur Sikri	Ummed Singh	BJP	29106	Badan Singh	JD	25107	3999
Mathura district
362	Goverdhan (SC)	Pooran Prakash	JD	31358	Ajay Kumar	BJP	29527	1831
363	Mathura	Ravi Kant Garg	BJP	45753	Pradeep Mathur	INC	23546	22207
364	Chhata	Kishori Shyam	BJP	32782	Tejpal Singh	Ind	29715	3067
365	Mant	Shyam Sunder Sharma	INC	31342	Kushal Pal Singh	JD	28044	3298
366	Gokul	Navav Singh	JD	26464	Pranat Pal Singh	BJP	25032	1432
367	Sadabad	Vijendra Singh	BJP	33122	Mustemand Ali Khan	JD	28107	5015
368	Hathras	Ram Saran Singh	JD	38190	Satya Pal Singh	BJP	30873	7317
369	Sasni (SC)	Hari Shanker Madhre	BJP	34956	Ramesh Karan	JD	17000	17956
Aligarh district
370	Sikandra Rao	Suresh Pratap Gandhi	JD	24840	Nekram Sharma	JP	21458	3382
371	Gangiri	Ram Singh	BJP	30319	Veeresh Yadav	SJP	24419	5900
372	Atrauli	Kalyan Singh	BJP	58640	Anwar Khan	INC	31263	27377
373	Aligarh	Krishna Kumar Navman	BJP	52670	Mohammad Sufiyan	JD	47249	5421
374	Koil (SC)	Kishan Lal Diler	BJP	52800	Phool Singh	JD	22992	29808
375	Iglas	Gyanwati Singh	JD	27315	Vikram Singh Hindol	BJP	24899	2416
376	Barauli	Dalvir Singh	JD	39523	Yashpal Singh Chauhan	BJP	23139	16384
377	Khair	Chaudhary Mahendra Singh	BJP	33736	Jagvir Singh	JD	28344	5392
Bulandshahr district
378	Jewar (SC)	Ho Ram	BJP	26255	Trilok Chand	INC	13450	12805
379	Khurja	Har Pal	Ind	34549	Allaudin	BSP	20197	14352
380	Debai	Ram Singh	BJP	39245	Khajan Singh	JD	17980	21265
381	Anupshahr	Naval Kishor	BJP	39988	Satish	INC	24005	15983
382	Syana	Basudev Singh	BJP	42485	Rakesh Tyagi	INC	19141	23344
383	Agota							
384	Bulandshahr	D. P. Yadav	JP	45765	Sukh Pal	BJP	34639	11126
385	Shikarpur (SC)	Ram Prasad	BJP	32517	Raj Kumar	INC	13868	18649
386	Sikandrabad	Narendra Bhati	JD	43835	Rajendra Solanki	INC	28383	15452
Ghaziabad district
387	Dadri	Mahendra Singh Bhati	JD	62552	Bihari Singh	SJP	19521	43031
388	Ghaziabad	Baleshwar Tyagi	BJP	54714	Anup Singh	JD	32887	21827
389	Muradnagar	Raj Pal Tyagi	INC	41513	Keshav Tyagi	BJP	20983	20530
390	Modinagar	Sukhveer Singh Gahlot	JD	46343	Ram Asrey	BJP	46172	171
391	Hapur (SC)	Vijendra Kumar	BJP	38116	Gajraj Singh	INC	34079	4037
392	Garhmukteshwar	Krishna Vir Singh Sirohi	BJP	24130	Akhtar	INC	22030	2100
Meerut district
393	Kithore							
394								
395	Sardhana	Vijaypal Singh Tomar	JD	36418	Surendra Singh	JP	27232	9186
396	Meerut Cantonment							
397	Meerut							
398	Kharkauda							
399	Siwalkhas (SC)	Charan Singh	JD	58977	Bhagmul Singh Premi	BJP	22197	36780
400	Khekra	Madan Bhaiya	SJP	49113	Balraj Singh	JD	21704	27409
401	Baghpat	Mahendra Jan	JD	34643	Ram Pal	INC	17355	17288
402	Barnawa	Katar Singh	JD	48166	Tripal Singh Dhama	BJP	16767	31399
403	Chhaprauli	Chaudhary Ajit Singh	JD	74212	Brij Pal	INC	11417	62795
Muzaffarnagar district
404	Kandhla	Virender Singh	JD	67387	Maharaj Singh	BJP	36610	30777
405	Khatauli	Sudhir Kumar Baliyan	BJP	53773	Birham Singh Baliyan	Ind	32252	21521
406	Jansath (SC)	Suresh	BJP	41137	Kabool Singh	JD	36128	5009
407	Morna	Ram Pal Singh	BJP	36207	Mehandi Asgar	JD	25122	11085
408	Muzaffarnagar	Suresh Sangal	BJP	67997	Virender	Ind	35830	32167
409	Charthawal (SC)	G. S. Vinod	JD	39666	Sher Singh	BJP	37016	2650
410	Baghra	Harendra Singh Malik	JD	51980	Pradeep Balyan	BJP	21295	30685
411	Kairana	Munawwar Hasan	JD	48224	Hukum Singh	INC	31660	16564
412	Thana Bhawan	Somansh Prakash	JD	41007	Jagat Singh	BJP	33069	7938
Saharanpur district
413	Nakur	Kunwar Pal Singh	JD	47957	Sadhu Ram	BJP	41137	6820
414	Sarsawa	Mohd. Hasan	JD	35618	Suresh	BJP	31051	4567
415	Nagal (SC)	Mam Chand	BJP	37624	Ramesh	JD	34106	3518
416	Deoband	Virender Singh	JD	46284	Shashi Bala Pundir	BJP	41112	5172
417	Harora (SC)	Vimla Rakesh	JD	48644	Mohar Singh	BJP	31825	16819
418	Saharanpur	Lal Krishan Gandhi	BJP	73864	Vijay Kumar	JD	55098	18766
419	Muzaffarabad	Jagdish Singh	JD	47456	Chander Pal Singh	BJP	45175	2281
Haridwar district
420	Roorkee	Prithvi Singh	BJP	43247	Mansur	JD	40794	2453
421	Laksar	Tejpal Singh Panwar	BJP	36700	Kulbir Singh	JD	35389	1311
422	Haridwar	Jagdish Muni	BJP	48728	Ambrish Kumar	JD	38994	9734
Dehradun district
423	Mussoorie	Rajendra Singh	BJP	37353	Kishori Lal Saklnai	INC	27149	10204
424	Dehradun	Harbans Kapoor	BJP	50419	Vinod	INC	29152	21267
425	Chakrata (ST)	Munna Singh Chauhan	JD	35575	Pritam Singh	INC	29270	6305
