= First Kalyan Singh ministry =

Government of Uttar Pradesh, India (1991–92)

- Ministry of Uttar Pradesh

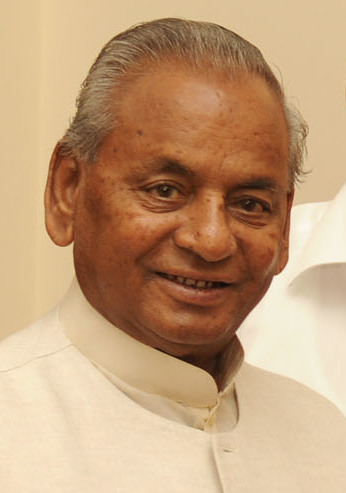
- Kalyan Singh; Hon'ble Chief Minister of Uttar Pradesh
- Date formed: 24 June 1991
- Date dissolved: 6 December 1992

People and organisations
- Head of state: B. Satyanarayan Reddy (Governor)
- Head of government: Kalyan Singh (Chief Minister)
- No. of ministers: 45
- Total no. of members: 45
- Status in legislature: Majority
- Opposition leader: Kailash Nath Singh Yadav; Rewati Raman Singh(assembly)

History
- Election: 1991
- Legislature terms: 1 year, 165 days
- Predecessor: First Mulayam Ministry

The First Kalyan Singh ministry is the council of ministers in headed by Chief Minister Kalyan Singh, which was formed after 1991 Uttar Pradesh Legislative Assembly election, where the BJP won 221 seats out of total 425 seats under his leadership. Kalyan Singh the leader of the party in the assembly was sworn in as Chief Minister of Uttar Pradesh on 24 June 1991. Here is the list of members of his ministry:

== Council of Ministers ==
=== Cabinet Ministers ===
𝗦.𝗡𝗼.	Portfolio	Minister	Party
1.	Chief Minister	Kalyan Singh	BJP
2.	Minister of Finance; Minister of Parliamentary Affairs	Rajendra Kumar Gupta	BJP
3.	Minister of Revenue	Brahm Dutt Dwivedi	BJP
4.	Minister of Public Works Department	Sarjeet Singh Dang	BJP
5.	Minister of Power	Lalji Tandon	BJP
6.	Minister of Irrigation	Om Prakash Singh	BJP
7.	Minister of Primary & Secondary Education	Rajnath Singh	BJP
8.	Minister of Agriculture	Ganga Bhakt Singh	BJP
9.	Minister of Social Welfare	Ramapati Shastri	BJP
10.	Minister of Minority Welfare	Aizaz Rizvi	BJP
11.	Minister of Health & Family Welfare	Dinesh Johri	BJP
12.	Minister of Transport Minister of Excise	Satya Prakash Vikal	BJP
13.	Minister of Higher Education; Minister of Labour & Employment	Narendra Kumar Singh Gaur	BJP
14.	Minister of Urban Development	Prem Lata Katiyar	BJP
15.	Minister of Co-operation	Sudhir Kumar Baliyan	BJP
16.	Minister of Tourism & Culture; Minister of Youth Affairs & Sports	Kedar Singh Phonia	BJP
17.	Minister of Sugarcane Development	Hanumant Singh	BJP

=== Ministers of State (Independent Charge) ===
𝗦.𝗡𝗼.	Portfolio	Minister	𝗣𝗮𝗿𝘁𝘆
18.	Minister of Jails; Minister of Political Pension	Umanath Singh	BJP
19.	Minister of Panchayati Raj	Krishna Swaroop Vaishya	BJP
20.	Minister of Animal Husbandry, Dairying & Fisheries	Chandrashekhar Singh	BJP
21.	Minister of Basic Education	Shiv Pratap Shukla	BJP

=== Ministers of State ===
𝗦.𝗡𝗼.	Portfolio	Minister	𝗣𝗮𝗿𝘁𝘆
22.	Minister of Finance	Hardwar Dubey	BJP
23.	Minister of Co-operation	Suraj Singh Shakya	BJP
24.	Minister of Revenue	Baleshwar Tyagi	BJP
25.	Minister of Hill Development (Uttaranchal)	Puran Chandra Sharma	BJP
26.	Minister of Planning	Sharda Chauhan	BJP
27.	Minister of Home Affairs	Surya Pratap Shahi	BJP
28.	Minister of Urban Development	Suresh Kumar Khanna	BJP
29.	Minister of Health & Family Welfare	Amar Singh	BJP
30.	Minister of Transport	Brijesh Kumar Sharma	BJP
31.	Minister of Social Welfare	Anil Kumar Tiwari	BJP
32.	Minister of Rural Development	Harbans Kapoor	BJP
33.	Minister of Tourism	Harak Singh Rawat	BJP
34.	Minister of Secondary Education	Amar Nath Yadav	BJP
35.	Minister of Horticulture	Dhanraj Yadav	BJP
36.	Minister of Panchayati Raj	Patiraj	BJP
37.	Minister of Irrigation	Prithvi Singh Viksit	BJP
38.	Minister of Food	Baburam M.Com	BJP
39.	Minister of Labour & Employment	Bal Chandra Misra	BJP
40.	Minister of Small Industry	Mayankar Singh	BJP
41.	Minister of Civil Supplies	Mastram Advocate	BJP
42.	Minister of Education; Minister of Agriculture	Mahavir Singh	BJP
43.	Minister of Power	Ravi Kant Garg	BJP
44.	Minister of Public Works Department	Patel Ramkumar Verma	BJP
45.	Minister of Sugarcane Development	Shiv Bahadur Saxena	BJP

== See also ==
Rajnath Singh ministry
