= Purshottam Khandelwal =

Indian Bharatiya Janata Party politician

Member of Uttar Pradesh Legislative Assembly
- Incumbent
- Assumed office 19 May 2019
- Preceded by: Jagan Prasad Garg
- Constituency: Agra North

Personal details
- Born: 16 September 1961 (age 64)
- Party: Bharatiya Janata Party
- Children: 2
- Occupation: Agriculture

Purshottam Khandelwal is an Indian politician. He is member of 18th Uttar Pradesh Assembly and was also elected to the 17th Uttar Pradesh Assembly from Agra North in the by-election in 2019 as a member of the Bharatiya Janata Party.
