= Satish Nigam =

Indian politician

Satish Kumar Nigam

Member of Legislative Assembly, Uttar Pradesh
- In office 2012 - 2017
- Preceded by: Prem Lata Katiyar
- Succeeded by: Neelima Katiyar
- Constituency: Kalyanpur

Personal details
- Born: 1 January 1961 (age 65) Kanpur, Uttar Pradesh, India
- Party: Samajwadi Party
- Spouse: Sunita Nigam
- Education: CSJM University

Satish Kumar Nigam (born 1 January 1961) is an Indian politician and former member of the Uttar Pradesh Legislative Assembly. He won the Kalyanpur assembly seat after defeating the Bharatiya Janata Party candidate Premlata Katiyar. He is a politician of Samajwadi Party. He was elected as the chairman of the seven members committee formed by Uttar Pradesh Legislative Assembly Speaker Mata Prasad Pandey to give judgement on a sting operation of a news channel related to 2013 Muzaffarnagar Riots.

He lost his seat in the 2017 Uttar Pradesh Assembly election to Nilima Katiyar of the Bharatiya Janata Party.
