= Muhammadabad-Gohna Assembly constituency =

Constituency of the Uttar Pradesh legislative assembly in India

Coordinates: 26.03°N 83.38°E

Muhammadabad-Gohna
- Constituency No. 355 for the Uttar Pradesh Legislative Assembly

Constituency details
- Country: India
- Region: North India
- State: Uttar Pradesh
- District: Mau
- Total electors: 3,80,470
- Reservation: SC

Member of Legislative Assembly
- 18th Uttar Pradesh Legislative Assembly
- Incumbent Rajendra Kumar
- Party: Samajwadi Party
- Elected year: 2022

Muhammadabad Gohna is a constituency of the Uttar Pradesh Legislative Assembly covering the city of Muhammadabad-Gohna in the Mau district of Uttar Pradesh, India.

Muhammadabad-Gohna is one of five assembly constituencies in the Ghosi Lok Sabha constituency in Uttar Pradesh, India. Since 2008, this assembly constituency is numbered 355 amongst 403 constituencies. It is not to be confused with Mohammadabad Assembly constituency in Ghazipur district.

== Members of Legislative Assembly ==
Year	Member	Party
1957	Chandrajit Yadav	Communist Party of India
1957	Shrinath	Indian National Congress
1962	Chandrajit Yadav	Communist Party of India
1967	Shri Nath	Indian National Congress
1969	Shyam Lal Kanaujia	Samyukta Socialist Party
1974	Shiv Prasad	Bharatiya Kranti Dal
1977	Shiv Prasad	Janata Party
1980	Tapeshwar	Communist Party of India
1985	Ram Badan	Indian National Congress
1989	Faujdar	Bahujan Samaj Party
1991	Shriram Sonkar	Bharatiya Janata Party
1993	Faujdar	Bahujan Samaj Party
1996	Shriram Sonkar	Bharatiya Janata Party
2002	Baijnath	Samajwadi Party
2007	Rajendra Kumar	Bahujan Samaj Party
2012	Baijnath	Samajwadi Party
2017	Shriram Sonkar	Bharatiya Janata Party
2022	Rajendra Kumar	Samajwadi Party

== Election results ==
=== 2027 ===
2027 Uttar Pradesh Legislative Assembly election: Muhammadabad-Gohna
Party	Candidate	Votes	%	±%
INDIA				
NDA				
BSP				
NOTA	None of the above			
Majority				
Turnout				
gain from		Swing		

=== 2022 ===
2022 Uttar Pradesh Legislative Assembly election: Muhammadabad-Gohna
Party	Candidate	Votes	%	±%
SP	Rajendra Kumar	94,688	41.48	+13.21
BJP	Smt. Poonam Saroj	68,039	29.8	−4.9
BSP	Dharm Singh Gautam	56,350	24.68	−9.77
Jan Adhikar Party	Mahendra Sonkar	3,186	1.4	+0.96
INC	Banwari Ram	2,452	1.07	
NOTA	None of the above	1,540	0.67	−0.26
Majority		26,649	11.68	+11.43
Turnout		228,291	60.0	+0.71
SP gain from BJP		Swing		

=== 2017 ===
Bharatiya Janta Party candidate Shriram Sonkar won in last Assembly election of 2017 Uttar Pradesh Legislative Elections defeating Bahujan Samaj Party candidate Rajendra by a margin of 538 votes.

2017 Uttar Pradesh Legislative Assembly Election: Muhammadabad-Gohn
Party	Candidate	Votes	%	±%
BJP	Shriram Sonkar	73,493	34.7	
BSP	Rajendra Kumar	72,955	34.45	
SP	Baijnath	59,871	28.27	
NOTA	None of the above	1,945	0.93	
Majority		538	0.25	
Turnout		211,785	59.29	
