= Kalyanpur, Uttar Pradesh Assembly constituency =

Constituency of the Uttar Pradesh legislative assembly in India

Kalyanpur
- Constituency No. 211 for the Uttar Pradesh Legislative Assembly

Constituency details
- Country: India
- Region: North India
- State: Uttar Pradesh
- District: Kanpur Nagar
- Lok Sabha constituency: Akbarpur
- Total electors: 3,44,303 (2019)
- Reservation: None

Member of Legislative Assembly
- 18th Uttar Pradesh Legislative Assembly
- Incumbent Neelima Katiyar
- Party: Bharatiya Janta Party
- Elected year: 2022

Kalyanpur Assembly constituency is one of 403 legislative assemblies of Uttar Pradesh. It is part of the Akbarpur Lok Sabha constituency in Kanpur district.

== Overview ==
Kalyanpur comprises Wards No. 3, 5, 6, 8, 14, 20, 21, 25, 27, 30, 32, 33, 47, 66, 68, 74, and 104 in Kanpur Municipal Corporation of 2-Kanpur Sadar Tehsil.

== Members of Legislative Assembly ==
Year	Member	Party
1967	S. G. Datta	Indian National Congress
1969	Krishna Bajpai	Bharatiya Kranti Dal
1974	Ram Narain Pathak	Indian National Congress
1977	Pushpa Talwar	Janata Party
1980	Ram Narain Pathak	Indian National Congress (I)
1985	Ram Narain Pathak	Indian National Congress
1989	Bhudhar Narayan Mishra	Janata Dal
1991	Prem Lata Katiyar	Bharatiya Janata Party
1993	Prem Lata Katiyar	Bharatiya Janata Party
1996	Prem Lata Katiyar	Bharatiya Janata Party
2002	Prem Lata Katiyar	Bharatiya Janata Party
2007	Prem Lata Katiyar	Bharatiya Janata Party
2012	Satish Nigam	Samajwadi Party
2017	Neelima Katiyar	Bharatiya Janata Party
2022	Neelima Katiyar	Bharatiya Janata Party

== Election results ==
=== 2027 ===
2027 Uttar Pradesh Legislative Assembly election: Kalyanpur
Party	Candidate	Votes	%	±%
INDIA				
NDA				
BSP				
NOTA	None of the above			
Majority				
Turnout				
gain from		Swing		

=== 2022 ===
2022 Uttar Pradesh Legislative Assembly election: Kalyanpur
Party	Candidate	Votes	%	±%
BJP	Neelima Katiyar	98,997	52.71	+4.02
SP	Satish Kumar Nigam	77,462	41.24	+5.67
BSP	Arun Mishra	6,615	3.52	−10.93
INC	Neha Tiwari	2,302	1.23	
NOTA	None of the above	894	0.48	−0.04
Majority		21,535	11.47	−1.65
Turnout		187,814	52.89	−0.34
BJP hold		Swing		

=== 2017 ===
Uttar Pradesh Assembly Election, 2017: Kalyanpur
Party	Candidate	Votes	%	±%
BJP	Neelima Katiyar	86,620	48.69	
SP	Satish Kumar Nigam	63,278	35.57	
BSP	Deepu Kumar Nishad	25,706	14.45	
NOTA	None of the above	921	0.52	
Majority		23,342	13.12	
Turnout		177,912	53.23	
BJP gain from SP		Swing		

=== 2012 ===
Uttar Pradesh Assembly Election, 2012: Kalyanpur
Party	Candidate	Votes	%	±%
SP	Satish Kumar Nigam	44,789	29.97	
BJP	Prem Lata Katiyar	42,406	28.38	
BSP	Nirmal Tiwari	37,862	25.34	
INC	Devi Prasad Tiwari	19,712	13.19	
LJP	Sangeeta Rani Savita	572	0.38	
Majority		2,383	1.59	
Turnout		1,49,442	49.37	
SP gain from BJP		Swing		

=== 2007 ===
Uttar Pradesh Assembly Election, 2007: Kalyanpur
Party	Candidate	Votes	%	±%
BJP	Prem Lata Katiyar	42,349	29.46	
BSP	Nirmal Tiwari	41,675	28.99	
SP	Satish Kumar Nigam	25,288	17.59	
INC	Alok Misra	23,800	16.56	
BSKP	Ram Narayan Nishad	5,633	3.91	
Majority		674	0.47	
Turnout		1,43,707	38.15	
BJP hold		Swing		

=== 2002 ===
Uttar Pradesh Assembly Election, 2002: Kalyanpur
Party	Candidate	Votes	%	±%
BJP	Prem Lata Katiyar	50,521	39.54	
INC	Alok Misra	42,359	33.15	
BSP	Rashmi Pathak	15,124	11.84	
SP	Amit Kumar	14,214	11.12	
RTKP	Abdul Kaleem Khan	1,696	1.33	
Majority		8,162	6.39	
Turnout		1,27,770	33.88	
BJP hold		Swing		

=== 1996 ===
Uttar Pradesh Assembly Election, 1996: Kalyanpur
Party	Candidate	Votes	%	±%
BJP	Prem Lata Katiyar	73,861	51.01	
INC	Ram Ji Tripathi	43,245	29.87	
AIIC(T)	Ragendra Swarup	25,797	17.82	
JNP	Shyam Katiyar	496	0.34	
IND.	Muzaffar Husain	447	0.31	
Majority		30,616	21.14	
Turnout		1,44,787	40.64	
BJP hold		Swing		

=== 1993 ===
Uttar Pradesh Assembly Election, 1993: Kalyanpur
Party	Candidate	Votes	%	±%
BJP	Prem Lata Katiyar	67,395	50.48	
INC	Ragendra Swarup	31,644	23.70	
BSP	Jogendra Singh	22,258	16.67	
JD	Mahendra Singh Chandel	7,984	5.98	
IND.	Davarshi Sharma	949	0.71	
Majority		35,751	26.78	
Turnout		1,33,518	52.69	
BJP hold		Swing		

U. P. Assembly Election, 2017 Kanpur Nagar Lok Sabha Constituency Summary
Party	Seats won	Seat change
Bharatiya Janata Party	7	▲3
Samajwadi Party	2	▼2
Indian National Congress	1	Steady

== See also ==
- List of constituencies of the Uttar Pradesh Legislative Assembly
