= Sataon Assembly constituency =

Defunct assembly constituency in Uttar Pradesh, India

Coordinates: 26.29°N 81.05°E

Sataon
- Former constituency No. 94 for the Uttar Pradesh Legislative Assembly

Constituency details
- Country: India
- Region: North India
- State: Uttar Pradesh
- District: Raebareli
- Established: 1967
- Abolished: 2012
- Total electors: 259,981 (2007)
- Reservation: None

Sataon was a constituency of the Uttar Pradesh Legislative Assembly in the Indian state of Uttar Pradesh. It ceased to exist in 2012. It was under Raebareli district.

== Members of the Legislative Assembly ==
Year	Member	Party
1967	Rajendra Pratap Singh	Indian National Congress
1969	Rajendra Pratap Singh	Indian National Congress
1974	Ram Deo Yadav	Indian National Congress
1977	Ram Deo Yadav	Indian National Congress
1980	Krishna Kumar	Indian National Congress
1985	Kamal Nayan Verma	Indian National Congress
1989	Kamal Nayan Verma	Indian National Congress
1991	Kamal Nayan Verma	Indian National Congress
1993	Ram Naresh Yadav	Samajwadi Party
1996	Shiv Ganesh Lodhi	Bahujan Samaj Party
2002	Surendra Vikram Singh	Bahujan Samaj Party
2007	Shiv Ganesh Lodhi	Indian National Congress
