= Ramesh Gautam =

Indian politician

Member of Uttar Pradesh Legislative Assembly
- In office 2007–2012
- Preceded by: Babu Lal
- Succeeded by: constituency abolished now Tarabganj
- Constituency: Dixir (SC)

Personal details
- Party: Samajwadi Party
- Parent: Mata Prasad (father)
- Education: Graduate
- Alma mater: Dr. Ram Manohar Lohia Avadh University
- Occupation: Agriculture

Ramesh Gautam, or Ramesh Chandra, is an Indian politician from the Samajwadi Party. He was a member of the Uttar Pradesh Legislative Assembly between 2007 and 2012, elected from Dixir (SC).

Gautam had started politics in 1989 and been a loyalist of the Bahujan Samaj Party for 31 years. In 2020, he was expelled from the party in what he called a "political conspiracy" within it. He shifted to the Samajwadi Party after that.

== Political life ==
Ramesh Gautam started politics in 1989 with the Bahujan Samaj Party. He became district president for 12 years, was given the charge of zonal coordinator in various divisions and was known for being a party loyalist.

He contested his first legislative assembly election from Dixir (SC) in 2007 and became an MLA. He has also contested from Mankapur (SC) in 2012 and 2017, and from Balha in a 2019 by-election.

In 2020, Gautam was expelled from the BSP by the district president Manoj Kumar Kanojia. He had served there for 31 years in the BSP and was expelled in what he described as a "political conspiracy" taking place within the party. He said that he was willing to come back if given the opportunity. He shifted to the Samajwadi Party after finding no recourse and was again fielded from Mankapur (SC) in the 2022 election as an SP candidate, where he received over 62,000 voters and came runner-up to the BJP candidate while the BSP secured around 6,500 votes at a distant third.
