= Rajendra Kumar (politician) =

Indian politician

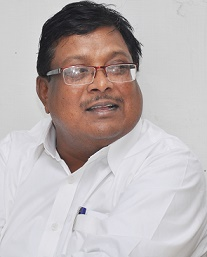

Rajendra Kumar (born 1960) is a leading politician and member of the Samajwadi Party in India. Active in politics from his college days, he was first elected in the year 1993 and became Cabinet Minister in the government in 1995. He has been a Member of The Legislative Assembly (MLA) since 2007 serving the Muhammadabad Gohna constituency in Mau District. Since 2008 he has been working as Bihar pradesh prabhari (BSP). He joined samajwadi party in the year 2021 and won the general election in 2022 from Muhammadabad Gohna Vidhan Sabha.
