= Mankapur Assembly constituency =

Constituency of the Uttar Pradesh legislative assembly in India

Coordinates: 27.05°N 82.21°E

Mankapur
- Constituency No. 300 for the Uttar Pradesh Legislative Assembly

Constituency details
- Country: India
- Region: North India
- State: Uttar Pradesh
- District: Gonda
- Total electors: 3,31,841
- Reservation: SC

Member of Legislative Assembly
- 18th Uttar Pradesh Legislative Assembly
- Incumbent Ramapati Shastri
- Party: BJP
- Elected year: 2017

Mankapur is a constituency of the Uttar Pradesh Legislative Assembly covering the city of Mankapur in the Gonda district of Uttar Pradesh, India. It is one of five assembly constituencies in the Gonda Lok Sabha constituency. Since 2008, this assembly constituency is numbered 300 amongst 403 constituencies.

== Members of the Legislative Assembly ==
Year	Member	Party
1957	Raja Raghavendra Pratap Singh	Independent politician
1962	Raja Raghavendra Pratap Singh	Swatantra Party
1964^	Kunwar Anand Singh	Indian National Congress
1967	Kunwar Anand Singh	Indian National Congress
1969	Kunwar Anand Singh	Indian National Congress
1972^	Devendra Nath Mishra	Indian National Congress
1974	Ram Garib	Indian National Congress
1977	Ganga Prasad	Indian National Congress
1980	Chhedi Lal	Indian National Congress (I)
1985	Ram Vishun Azad	Indian National Congress
1989	Ram Vishun Azad	Indian National Congress
1991	Chhedi Lal	Bharatiya Janata Party
1993	Ram Vishun Azad	Indian National Congress
1996	Ram Vishun Azad	Samajwadi Party
2002	Ram Vishun Azad	Samajwadi Party
2007	Ram Vishun Azad	Samajwadi Party
2012	Babulal	Samajwadi Party
2017	Ramapati Shastri	Bharatiya Janata Party
2022	Ramapati Shastri	Bharatiya Janata Party

^denotes by-poll

== Election results ==
=== 2027 ===
2027 Uttar Pradesh Legislative Assembly election: Mankapur
Party	Candidate	Votes	%	±%
INDIA				
NDA				
BSP				
NOTA	None of the above			
Majority				
Turnout				
gain from		Swing		

=== 2022 ===
2022 Uttar Pradesh Legislative Assembly election: Mankapur
Party	Candidate	Votes	%	±%
BJP	Ramapati Shastri	105,677	57.69	+0.39
SP	Ramesh Gautam	63,328	34.57	+20.81
BSP	Shyam Narayan	6,579	3.59	−20.2
NOTA	None of the above	2,291	1.25	−0.32
Majority		42,349	23.12	−10.39
Turnout		183,192	55.2	−1.11
BJP hold		Swing		

=== 2017 ===
Bharatiya Janta Party candidate Ramapati Shastri won in last Assembly election of 2017 Uttar Pradesh Legislative Elections defeating Bahujan Samaj Party candidate Ramesh Chandra Gautam by a margin of 60,161 votes.

2017 Uttar Pradesh Legislative Assembly Election: Mankapu
Party	Candidate	Votes	%	±%
BJP	Ramapati Shastri	102,862	57.3	
BSP	Ramesh Chandra	42,701	23.79	
SP	Ram Bishun Azad	24,695	13.76	
NOTA	None of the above	2,769	1.57	
Majority		60,161	33.51	
Turnout		179,521	56.31	
