= Paltu Ram =

Indian politician

Minister of State Government of Uttar Pradesh
- In office September 26, 2021 – March 25, 2022
- Chief Minister: Yogi Adityanath
- Ministry and Department's: Home Guards; Sainik Kalyan; Civil Security Department

Member of Uttar Pradesh Legislative assembly
- Incumbent
- Assumed office March 11, 2017
- Preceded by: Jagram Paswan
- Constituency: Balrampur

Personal details
- Born: August 1, 1972 (age 53) Gonda, Uttar Pradesh
- Party: Bharatiya Janata Party
- Profession: Politician

Paltu Ram is an Indian politician who currently represents Balrampur in the 18th Uttar Pradesh Assembly. He is also a former Minister of State in the Government of Uttar Pradesh, and previously represented Balrampur in the 17th Uttar Pradesh Assembly from 2017 to 2022.He is a member of the Bharatiya Janata Party.

== Political career ==
From 2017 to 2022 he was an MLA from Balrampur, Uttar Pradesh Assembly constituency.

Following the 2022 Uttar Pradesh Legislative Assembly election, he was reelected as an MLA from the Balrampur, Uttar Pradesh Assembly constituency, defeating Jagram Paswan, the candidate from the Indian National Congress (INC) by a margin of 10,971 votes.

On 26 September 2021, the Chief Minister of Uttar Pradesh, Yogi Adityanath, appointed Paltu Ram as the Minister of state for Sainik Welfare in Uttar Pradesh government in his 1st Yogi Adityanath ministry.
