= Mathura Assembly constituency =

Constituency of the Uttar Pradesh legislative assembly in India

Coordinates: 27.4756°N 77.6934°E

Mathura (मथुरा)
- Constituency No. 84 for the Uttar Pradesh Legislative Assembly

Constituency details
- Country: India
- Region: North India
- State: Uttar Pradesh
- District: Mathura
- Established: 1956
- Total electors: 4,42,209 (2019)
- Reservation: None

Member of Legislative Assembly
- 18th Uttar Pradesh Legislative Assembly
- Incumbent Shrikant Sharma
- Party: Bharatiya Janata Party
- Elected year: 2017

Mathura Assembly constituency is one of the 403 constituencies of the Uttar Pradesh Legislative Assembly, India. It is a part of the Mathura district and one of the five assembly constituencies in the Mathura Lok Sabha constituency.

The first election in this assembly constituency was held in 1957 after the delimitation order was passed in 1956. After the "Delimitation of Parliamentary and Assembly Constituencies Order" was passed in 2008, the constituency was assigned identification number 84.

== Wards / Areas ==
Extent of Mathura Assembly constituency is PCs Jaisinghpura, Ganesara, Naugaon, Maholi, Narholi, Mathura Bangar, Aurangabad, Dhangaon, Aduki of Mathura KC, PCs 1Sakraya Bangar, Vrindaban of Vrindaban KC, Chhatikara, Jait, Vrindaban MB, Mathura MB & Mathura (CB) of Mathura Tehsil.

== Members of Legislative Assembly ==
| Year | Member | Party |
|---|---|---|
| 1957 | Sri Nath | Indian National Congress |
| 1962 | Kedar Nath | Indian National Congress |
| 1967 | Devi Charan Agnihotri | Independent |
| 1969 | Shanti Charan Pidara | Indian National Congress |
| 1974 | Ram Babu | Indian National Congress |
| 1977 | Kanhaiya Lal | Janata Party |
| 1980 | Dayal Krishan | Indian National Congress (I) |
| 1985 | Pradeep Mathur | Indian National Congress |
| 1989 | Ravi Kant Garg | Bharatiya Janata Party |
| 1991 | Ravi Kant Garg | Bharatiya Janata Party |
| 1993 | Ram Swaroop Sharma | Bharatiya Janata Party |
| 1996 | Ram Swaroop Sharma | Bharatiya Janata Party |
| 2002 | Pradeep Mathur | Indian National Congress |
| 2007 | Pradeep Mathur | Indian National Congress |
| 2012 | Pradeep Mathur | Indian National Congress |
| 2017 | Shrikant Sharma | Bharatiya Janata Party |
| 2022 | Shrikant Sharma | Bharatiya Janata Party |

== Election results ==
Vote share of winning candidates
| 2022 | 60.26% |
| 2017 | 56.65% |
| 2012 | 27.16% |
| 2007 | 36.96% |

=== 2027 ===
2027 Uttar Pradesh Legislative Assembly election: Mathura
| Party | Candidate | Votes | % | ±% |
|---|---|---|---|---|
| INDIA | | | | |
| NDA | | | | |
| BSP | | | | |
| NOTA | None of the above | | | |
| Majority | | | | |
| Turnout | | | | |
| gain from | | Swing | | |

=== 2022 ===
2022 Uttar Pradesh Legislative Assembly election: Mathura
| Party | Candidate | Votes | % | ±% |
|---|---|---|---|---|
| BJP | Shrikant Sharma | 158,859 | 60.26 | +3.61 |
| INC | Pradeep Mathur | 49,056 | 18.61 | +1.93 |
| BSP | S. K. Sharma | 31,551 | 11.97 | −0.35 |
| SP | Davendra Agarwal | 18,476 | 7.01 | |
| NOTA | None of the above | 1,078 | 0.41 | −0.08 |
| Majority | | 109,803 | 41.65 | +1.68 |
| Turnout | | 263,621 | 57.39 | −2.05 |
| BJP hold | | Swing | | |

=== 2017 ===
2017 Uttar Pradesh Legislative Assembly election: Mathura
| Party | Candidate | Votes | % | ±% |
|---|---|---|---|---|
| BJP | Shrikant Sharma | 143,361 | 56.65 | |
| INC | Pradeep Mathur | 42,200 | 16.68 | |
| BSP | Yogesh Kumar | 31,168 | 12.32 | |
| RLD | Ashok Agrawal | 29,080 | 11.49 | |
| NOTA | None of the above | 1,235 | 0.49 | |
| Majority | | 101,161 | 39.97 | |
| Turnout | | 253,071 | 59.44 | |
| BJP gain from INC | | Swing | | |

=== 2012 ===
2012 Uttar Pradesh legislative assembly election: Mathura
| Party | Candidate | Votes | % | ±% |
|---|---|---|---|---|
| INC | Pradeep Mathur | 54,498 | 27.16 | |
| BJP | Devendra Sharma | 53,997 | 26.91 | |
| SP | Ashok Agrawal | 53,049 | 26.44 | |
| BSP | Pushpa Sharma | 30,240 | 15.07 | |
| SS | Suresh Baghel | 972 | 0.48 | |
| Majority | | 501 | 0.25 | |
| Turnout | | 2,00,654 | 56.01 | |
| INC hold | | Swing | | |

=== 2007 ===
2007 Uttar Pradesh Legislative Assembly election: Mathura
| Party | Candidate | Votes | % | ±% |
|---|---|---|---|---|
| INC | Pradeep Mathur | 45,383 | 36.96 | |
| BJP | Murari Lal | 24,293 | 19.78 | |
| BSP | Devendra Gautam | 22,550 | 18.36 | |
| SP | Krishna Kumar Sharma | 17,364 | 14.14 | |
| RLD | Sanjay Sharma | 4,036 | 3.29 | |
| Majority | | 21,090 | 17.17 | |
| Turnout | | 122,806 | | |
| INC hold | | Swing | | |

== See also ==
- Mathura district
- Mathura Lok Sabha constituency
- Sixteenth Legislative Assembly of Uttar Pradesh
- Uttar Pradesh Legislative Assembly
