= Orai Assembly constituency =

Constituency of the Uttar Pradesh legislative assembly in India

Coordinates: 26.00°N 79.45°E

Orai
- Constituency No. 221 for the Uttar Pradesh Legislative Assembly

Constituency details
- Country: India
- Region: North India
- State: Uttar Pradesh
- District: Jalaun
- Total electors: 4,31,601 (2014)
- Reservation: SC

Member of Legislative Assembly
- 18th Uttar Pradesh Legislative Assembly
- Incumbent Gauri Shankar Verma
- Party: Bharatiya Janta Party
- Elected year: 2022

Orai is a constituency of the Uttar Pradesh Legislative Assembly covering the city of Orai in the Jalaun district of Uttar Pradesh, India.

Orai is one of five assembly constituencies in the Jalaun Lok Sabha constituency. Since 2008, this assembly constituency is numbered 221 amongst 403 constituencies.

== Members of Legislative Assembly ==
Year	Member	Party
1967	Chaturbhuj Sharma	Indian National Congress
1969	Chaturbhuj Sharma	Indian National Congress
1974	Anand Swaroop	Indian National Congress
1977	Shyam Sundar	Janata Party
1980	Suresh Datt Paliwal	Indian National Congress (I)
1985	Arvind Tiwari	Indian National Congress
1989	Akbar Ali	Bahujan Samaj Party
1991	Baburam M.Com	Bharatiya Janata Party
1993	Akbar Ali	Bahujan Samaj Party
1996	Baburam M.Com	Bharatiya Janata Party
2002	Baburam M.Com	Bharatiya Janata Party
2007	Vinod Chaturvedi	Indian National Congress
2012	Dayashankar Sharma	Samajwadi Party
2017	Mr. Gauri Shankar Verma	Bharatiya Janata Party
2022	Mr. Gauri Shankar Verma	Bharatiya Janata Party

== Election results ==
=== 2027 ===
2027 Uttar Pradesh Legislative Assembly election: Orai
Party	Candidate	Votes	%	±%
INDIA				
NDA				
BSP				
NOTA	None of the above			
Majority				
Turnout				
gain from		Swing		

2022 Uttar Pradesh Legislative Assembly Election: Ora
Party	Candidate	Votes	%	±%
BJP	Gauri Shankar Verma	128,644	47.45	−5.53
SP	Dayashankar Verma	90,996	33.56	+10.32
BSP	Satyendra Pratap	38,638	14.25	−7.45
INC	Urmila Devi Sonkar	4,650	1.72	
NOTA	None of the above	1,682	0.62	−0.2
Majority		37,648	13.89	−15.85
Turnout		271,107	60.93	−1.61
BJP hold		Swing		

2017 Uttar Pradesh Legislative Assembly Election: Ora
Party	Candidate	Votes	%	±%
BJP	Gauri Shankar Verma	140,485	52.98	
SP	Mahendra Singh	61,606	23.24	
BSP	Vijay Chaudhary	57,541	21.7	
NOTA	None of the above	2,169	0.82	
Majority		78,879	29.74	
Turnout		265,142	62.54	

== See also ==
- 2017 Uttar Pradesh Legislative Assembly election
- 2022 Uttar Pradesh Legislative Assembly election
