= Umanath Singh =

Indian politician

Minister of Jails Government of Uttar Pradesh
- In office 24 June 1991 – 6 December 1992
- Chief Minister: Kalyan Singh

Member of Uttar Pradesh Legislative Assembly
- In office 1989–1993
- Preceded by: Raj Bahadur
- Succeeded by: Shri Ram Yadav
- Constituency: Bayalsi
- In office 1969–1977
- Preceded by: Lal Bahadur
- Succeeded by: Chandra Sen
- Constituency: Bayalsi

Personal details
- Born: 13 August 1937 Maheshpur, Jaunpur district
- Died: 13 September 1993 (aged 56)
- Party: Bharatiya Janata Party
- Spouse: Susheela Singh
- Children: 1 son (Krishna Pratap), 4 daughters
- Parent: Ramsurat Singh (father)
- Profession: Politician

Umanath Singh (13 August 1937 – 13 September 1993) was an Indian politician from Uttar Pradesh who served as the jail minister in First Kalyan Singh ministry in 1991. He was elected to Uttar Pradesh Legislative Assembly from Bayalsi constituency in 1969 and 1974 on the symbol of Jana Sangh. He was elected from Bayalsi again in 1989 and 1991 on the symbol of Bharatiya Janata Party. His son Krishna Pratap Singh had represented Jaunpur Lok Sabha constituency from 2014 to 2019.
