= Agra East Assembly constituency =

Former constituency of the Uttar Pradesh legislative assembly in India

Coordinates: 27.18°N 78.00°E

Agra East
- Former constituency for the Uttar Pradesh Legislative Assembly

Constituency details
- Country: India
- Region: North India
- State: Uttar Pradesh
- District: Agra
- Established: 1967
- Abolished: 2008

Agra East Assembly constituency was a legislative assembly of Uttar Pradesh. As a consequence of the orders of the Delimitation Commission, Agra East Assembly constituency ceases to exist from 2008.

== Members of Legislative Assembly ==
The Members of Legislative Assembly are given follows-

Year	Winner	Party	Runner up	Party	Ref.
1967	R. S. Agrawal	Bharatiya Jana Sangh	Dr. P. N. Gupta	Indian National Congress	
1969	Prakash Narain Gupta	Indian National Congress	Baloji Agarwal	SSP	
1974	Prakash Narain Gupta	Indian National Congress	Satya Prakash Vikal	Bharatiya Jana Sangh	
1977	Surendra Kumar Kalra (Sindhu)	Indian National Congress	Prakash Narain Gupta	Janata Party	
1980	Om Prakash Jindal	Indian National Congress (I)	Satya Prakash Vikal	Bharatiya Janata Party	
1985	Satya Prakash Vikal	Bharatiya Janata Party	Satish Chand Gupta	Indian National Congress	
1989	Satya Prakash Vikal	Bharatiya Janata Party	Satish Chand Gupta	Indian National Congress	
1991	Satya Prakash Vikal	Bharatiya Janata Party	Om Prakash Jindal	Indian National Congress	
1993	Satya Prakash Vikal	Bharatiya Janata Party	Om Prakash Jindal	Indian National Congress	
1996	Satya Prakash Vikal	Bharatiya Janata Party	Banke Bihari Agarwal	Indian National Congress	
1998^	Jagan Prasad Garg	Bharatiya Janata Party	Govind Agrawal	Indian National Congress	
2002	Jagan Prasad Garg	Bharatiya Janata Party	Govind Agrawal	Indian National Congress	
2007	Jagan Prasad Garg	Bharatiya Janata Party	Sarva Prakash Kapoor	Bahujan Samaj Party	
Delimitation:- After 2008, Assembly known as Agra North Assembly constituency

^ by poll
