= Shrikant Sharma =

Indian politician

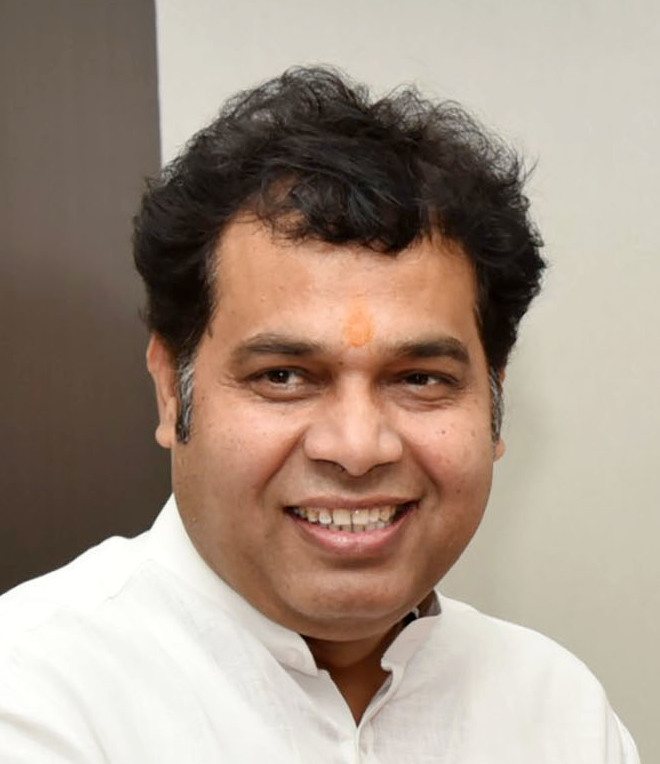

Minister of Energy Government of Uttar Pradesh
- In office 19 March 2017 – 25 March 2022
- Chief Minister: Yogi Adityanath
- Succeeded by: A. K. Sharma

Member of Uttar Pradesh Legislative Assembly
- Incumbent
- Assumed office 11 March 2017
- Preceded by: Pradeep Mathur
- Constituency: Mathura

Personal details
- Born: 1 July 1970 (age 56) Govardhan, Uttar Pradesh, India
- Spouse: Shalini Sharma
- Children: Two sons
- Education: Bachelor of Arts (Political Science), University of Delhi

Shrikant Sharma is an Indian politician and a member of the 17th & 18th Uttar Pradesh Legislative Assembly from Mathura Constituency in Mathura district. He was also sworn in as a minister in Yogi Adityanath cabinet where he held the portfolio of Energy Department. During his tenure as the Energy Minister, the State of Uttar Pradesh saw a drastic change in the basic infrastructure of the Electricity transmission and distribution setup. His target was to provide 24 Hours electricity supply to Districts, 22 Hours Electricity Supply to Tehsils and 18 hours Electricity supply to the villages which was achieved by the Energy Department during his tenure. He also introduced the 1912 Electricity Helpline in the State, which was a great step to connect the consumers directly with the Electricity Department, so that their issues can be resolved as soon as possible.

In 2022 Uttar Pradesh Legislative Assembly Election, Shrikant Sharma won by a huge margin of 1,09,803 votes breaking his previous record set in 2017 Uttar Pradesh Legislative Assembly Election of 1,01,161 votes. He won with a thumping majority of 60% votes.

He was also the National Secretary of Bharatiya Janata Party.
