= Rajnath Singh ministry =

Government of Uttar Pradesh, India (2000–02)

- Ministry of Uttar Pradesh
- 2000-02
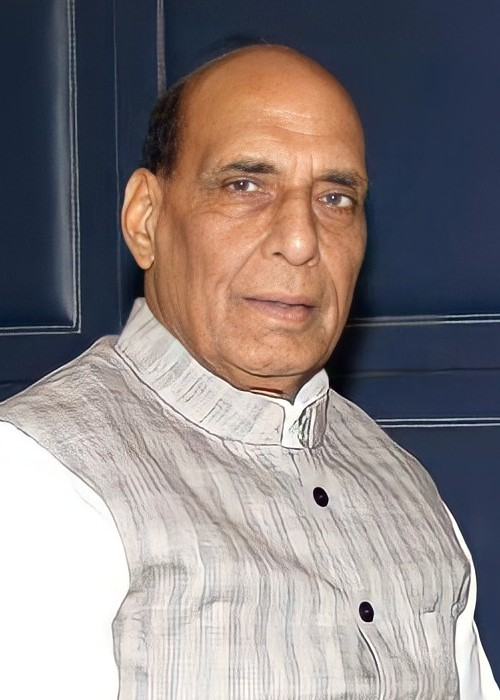
- Rajnath Singh; Chief Minister of Uttar Pradesh
- Date formed: 28 October 2000
- Date dissolved: 8 March 2002

People and organisations
- Head of government: Rajnath Singh (Chief Minister)
- No. of ministers: 88
- Member parties: BJP; ABLC; Jantantrik Bahujan Samaj Party; JD (Pandey); IND
- Status in legislature: Coalition
- Opposition party: SP

History
- Election: 1996
- Legislature terms: 1 year, 131 days
- Predecessor: Ram Prakash Gupta Ministry

The Rajnath Singh ministry was the council of ministers in headed by Chief Minister Rajnath Singh, which was formed after 1996 Uttar Pradesh Legislative Assembly election, where the BJP won 174 seats out of total 425 seats. Rajnath Singh the leader of the party in the assembly was sworn in as Chief Minister of Uttar Pradesh on 28 October 2000. Here is the list of members of his ministry:

== Council of ministers ==
=== Cabinet Ministers ===
| Portfolio | Minister | Took office | Left office | Party |
|---|---|---|---|---|
| Chief Minister; Home; Appointments & Personnel; General Administration; Other departments not allocated to any Minister | Rajnath Singh | 28 October 2000 | 8 March 2002 | BJP |
| Minister of Finance | Harish Chandra Srivastava | 28 October 2000 | 8 March 2002 | BJP |
| Minister of Housing, Urban Development, Water, Urban Employment & Rural Development Programme | Lalji Tandon | 28 October 2000 | 8 March 2002 | BJP |
| Minister of Revenue | Virendra Singh Sirohi | 28 October 2000 | 8 March 2002 | BJP |
| Minister of Health & Family Welfare | Ramapati Shastri | 28 October 2000 | 8 March 2002 | BJP |
| Minister of Secondary Education | Naipal Singh | 28 October 2000 | 8 March 2002 | BJP |
| Minister of Panchayat Raj | Dharmpal Singh | 28 October 2000 | 8 March 2002 | BJP |
| Minister of Planning & Statistics | Suresh Kumar Khanna | 28 October 2000 | 8 March 2002 | BJP |
| Minister of Excise & Liquor Prohibition | Surya Pratap Shahi | 28 October 2000 | 8 March 2002 | BJP |
