= Neelima Katiyar =

Indian politician

Minister of State for Higher Education and Science & Technology, Government of Uttar Pradesh
- In office 21 August 2019 – 10 March 2022
- Chief Minister: Yogi Adityanath

Member of the Uttar Pradesh legislative assembly
- Incumbent
- Assumed office 11 March 2017
- Preceded by: Satish Kumar Nigam
- Constituency: Kalyanpur

Personal details
- Born: 8 December 1973 (age 52) Kanpur, Uttar Pradesh, India
- Party: Bharatiya Janata Party
- Parent: Prem Lata Katiyar
- Education: M.A. 2001, CSJM University Kanpur
- Profession: Social work, business, politician

Neelima Katiyar is an Indian politician and the Minister of State in the Government of Uttar Pradesh. She was member of Uttar Pradesh Legislative Assembly.

== Personal life ==
Neelima was born in Kalyanpur, Uttar Pradesh. She is the daughter of Prem Lata Katiyar, a former minister in Uttar Pradesh.

== Education ==
Katiyar earned M.A. and B.A. degrees from Chhatrapati Shahu Ji Maharaj University (formerly Kanpur University).

== Political life ==
In 2017 she was elected as a Member of Legislative Assembly of Uttar Pradesh from Kalyanpur, Kanpur (Vidhan Sabha constituency) as a Bharatiya Janta Party candidate with 86620 votes in this election.

She has been appointed Minister of state in a Yogi Adityanath cabinet on 21 August 2019.
