= Sunil Dutt Dwivedi =

Indian politician

Member of the Uttar Pradesh legislative assembly
- Incumbent
- Assumed office 11 March 2017
- Constituency: Farrukhabad

Personal details
- Born: Leelapur, Amritpur
- Party: Bharatiya Janata Party
- Parent: Brahm Dutt Dwivedi
- Education: (LLB) Mumbai University; Officers Training Academy
- Occupation: Politics
- Profession: Politician

Sunil Dutt Dwivedi is an Indian politician and a member of 17th Uttar Pradesh Assembly, Uttar Pradesh of India. He represents the Farrukhabad constituency in Farrukhabad of Uttar Pradesh. He has served in the Indian Army from the year 1990 to 1995 in the Regiment of Artillery.

== Political career ==
Dwivedi contested Uttar Pradesh Assembly Election as Bharatiya Janata Party candidate and defeated his close contestant Mohd. Umar Khan from Bahujan Samaj Party with a margin of 45,427 votes.

== Posts held ==
| # | From | To | Position | Comments |
|---|---|---|---|---|
| 01 | 2017 | Incumbent | Member, 17th Legislative Assembly | |
