= Satya Prakash Vikal =

Indian politician

Minister of Transport Government of Uttar Pradesh
- In office 24 June 1991 – 6 December 1992
- Chief Minister: Kalyan Singh

Minister of Excise Government of Uttar Pradesh
- In office 24 June 1991 – 6 December 1992
- Chief Minister: Kalyan Singh

Member of Uttar Pradesh Legislative Assembly
- In office 1985–1998
- Preceded by: Om Prakash Jindal
- Succeeded by: Jagan Prasad Garg
- Constituency: Agra East

Personal details
- Born: 2 November 1927; Agra
- Died: 1998 (aged 70–71)
- Political party: Bharatiya Janata Party
- Spouse: Shanti Devi (m. 1943)
- Children: 4 sons, 1 daughter
- Parent: Prabhu Dayal Agrawal (father)
- Profession: Businessman, Politician

Satya Prakash Vikal was an Indian politician from BJP Uttar Pradesh who had served as the Transport & Excise Minister under First Kalyan Singh ministry in 1991. He served as the member of Uttar Pradesh Legislative Assembly from Agra East constituency from 1985 to 1998 till his death.
