= Farrukhabad Assembly constituency =

Constituency of the Uttar Pradesh legislative assembly in India

Coordinates: 27.38°N 79.59°E

Farrukhabad
- Constituency No. 194 for the Uttar Pradesh Legislative Assembly

Constituency details
- Country: India
- Region: North India
- State: Uttar Pradesh
- District: Farrukhabad
- Total electors: 3,72,555
- Reservation: None

Member of Legislative Assembly
- 18th Uttar Pradesh Legislative Assembly
- Incumbent Sunil Dutt Dwivedi
- Party: Bharatiya Janta Party
- Elected year: 2022

Farrukhabad is a constituency of the Uttar Pradesh Legislative Assembly covering the city of Farrukhabad in the Farrukhabad district of Uttar Pradesh, India.

Farrukhabad is one of five assembly constituencies in the Farrukhabad Lok Sabha constituency. Since 2008, this assembly constituency is numbered 194 amongst 403 constituencies.

== Members of the Legislative Assembly ==
Year	Member	Party
1957	Ram Kishan	Indian National Congress
1962	Daya Ram Shakya	Bharatiya Jana Sangh
1967	Maharam Singh	Indian National Congress
1969	Maharam Singh	Indian National Congress
1974	Vimal Prasad Tiwari	Indian National Congress
1977	Brahm Dutt Dwivedi	Janata Party
1980	Vimal Prasad Tiwari	Indian National Congress (I)
1985	Brahm Dutt Dwivedi	Bharatiya Janata Party
1989	Vimal Prasad Tiwari	Indian National Congress
1991	Brahm Dutt Dwivedi	Bharatiya Janata Party
1993	Brahm Dutt Dwivedi	Bharatiya Janata Party
1996	Brahm Dutt Dwivedi	Bharatiya Janata Party
1997^	Prabha Dwivedi	Bharatiya Janata Party
2002	Vijay Singh	Independent
2007	Vijay Singh	Samajwadi Party
2007^	Anant Mishra	Bahujan Samaj Party
2012	Vijay Singh	Independent
2017	Sunil Dutt Dwivedi	Bharatiya Janata Party
2022	Sunil Dutt Dwivedi	Bharatiya Janata Party

== Election results ==
=== 2027 ===
2027 Uttar Pradesh Legislative Assembly election: Farrukhabad
Party	Candidate	Votes	%	±%
INDIA				
NDA				
BSP				
NOTA	None of the above			
Majority				
Turnout				
gain from		Swing		

=== 2022 ===
2022 Uttar Pradesh Legislative Assembly election: Farrukhabad
Party	Candidate	Votes	%	±%
BJP	Sunil Dutt Dwivedi	112,314	53.83	+8.81
SP	Suman Sakya	72,998	34.99	+17.68
BSP	Vijay Kumar Katiyar	16,611	7.96	−15.21
INC	Louis Kurshid	2,045	0.98	
NOTA	None of the above	930	0.45	+0.28
Majority		39,316	18.84	−3.01
Turnout		208,634	56.0	−2.53
BJP hold		Swing		

=== 2017 ===
2017 Uttar Pradesh Legislative Assembly election: Farrukhabad
Party	Candidate	Votes	%	±%
BJP	Sunil Dutt Dwivedi	93,626	45.02	
BSP	Mohd Umar Khan	48,199	23.17	
SP	Vijay Singh	36,012	17.31	
Independent	Manoj Agarwal	20,656	9.93	
NOTA	None of the above	359	0.17	
Majority		45,427	21.85	
Turnout		207,982	58.53	
