= Dinesh Johri =

Indian politician

Minister of Health Government of Uttar Pradesh
- In office 24 June 1991 – October 1991
- Chief Minister: Kalyan Singh

Member of Uttar Pradesh Legislative Assembly
- In office 1985–1993
- Preceded by: Ram Singh Khanna
- Succeeded by: Rajesh Agarwal
- Constituency: Bareilly

Personal details
- Born: 3 April 1941; Jhansi
- Died: 22 September 2023 (aged 82)
- Political party: Bharatiya Janata Party
- Spouse: Prabha Johri (m. 1964)
- Children: 1 son, 2 daughters
- Parent: B. B. Johri (father)
- Education: MBBS
- Profession: Doctor, Hotelier, Politician

Dinesh Johri was an Indian politician from BJP Uttar Pradesh who had served as the Health Minister under First Kalyan Singh ministry in 1991. He served as the member of Uttar Pradesh Legislative Assembly from Bareilly constituency from 1985 to 1993.
