= Puran Chandra Sharma =

Indian politician (1945–2023)

President of Bharatiya Janata Party, Uttarakhand
- In office 9 November 2000 – 15 September 2002
- Preceded by: Office established
- Succeeded by: Manohar Kant Dhyani

Minister of Hill Development Government of Uttar Pradesh
- In office 24 June 1991 – 6 December 1992
- Chief Minister: Kalyan Singh

Member of Uttar Pradesh Legislative Assembly
- In office 1991–1993
- Preceded by: Saraswati Tiwari
- Succeeded by: Govind Singh Kunjwal
- Constituency: Almora

Personal details
- Born: 1 June 1945 Almora
- Died: 22 September 2023 (aged 78)
- Party: Bharatiya Janata Party
- Spouse: Suman Sharma (m. 1986)
- Children: 1 daughter
- Parent: Govardhan Sharma (father)

Puran Chandra Sharma (1 June 1945 – 22 September 2023) was an Indian politician from BJP Uttar Pradesh who had served as the Health Minister under First Kalyan Singh ministry in 1991. He served as the member of Uttar Pradesh Legislative Assembly from Almora constituency from 1991 to 1993.
