= Jagan Prasad Garg =

Indian politician

MLA, 16th Legislative Assembly
- In office Mar 2012 – Mar 2017
- Preceded by: None
- Constituency: Agra North

MLA, 15th Legislative Assembly
- In office May 2007 – Mar 2012
- Preceded by: Jagan Prasad Garg
- Succeeded by: None
- Constituency: Agra East

MLA, 14th Legislative Assembly
- In office Feb 2002 – May 2007
- Preceded by: Satya Prakash Vikal
- Succeeded by: Jagan Prasad Garg
- Constituency: Agra East

MLA, 13th Legislative Assembly
- In office Nov 1998 – Mar 2002

Personal details
- Born: 20 July 1952 Village Sarhendi, Agra district
- Died: 10 April 2019 (aged 66) Agra district
- Citizenship: Indian
- Party: Bharatiya Janata Party
- Spouse: Laxmi Garg (Wife)
- Children: Shweta Mittal, Namita Goyal, Vaibhav Garg, Saurabh Garg
- Parent: Badri Prasad Garg (Father)
- Education: Agra college
- Profession: Businessman, politician
- Website: mlajaganprasadgarg.in

Jagan Prasad Garg was an Indian politician and member of the 13th, 14th, 15th and the 16th Legislative assemblies of Uttar Pradesh. Garg was a member of the Bharatiya Janata Party and represented Agra North constituency of Uttar Pradesh during the Sixteenth Legislative Assembly of Uttar Pradesh.

== Early life and education ==
Jagan Prasad Garg was born in the village Sarhendi in Agra, India in 1952. Garg completed Bachelor's degree from Agra College. Prior to entering politics, he was a businessperson by profession.

== Political career ==
Jagan Prasad Garg has been a MLA for four straight terms (since 1998). He was elected during the by-elections in 1998 for his first term (constituency not known). In his second and third terms, he contested from Agra East (Assembly constituency) (ceased to exist after "Delimitation of Parliamentary and Assembly Constituencies Order, 2008"). He later represented Agra North (Assembly constituency) and was a member of the Bharatiya Janata Party.

On 26 October 2017, Garg caused controversy after he told reporters that he believed the Taj Mahal was built after demolishing a Shiva temple.

== Posts held ==
#	From	To	Position	Comments
01	1998	2002	Member, 13th Legislative Assembly	
02	2002	2007	Member, 14th Legislative Assembly	
03	2007	2012	Member, 15th Legislative Assembly	
04	2012	2017	Member, 16th Legislative Assembly	

== See also ==
- Agra North
- Uttar Pradesh Legislative Assembly
- 16th Legislative Assembly of Uttar Pradesh
- Politics of India
- Bharatiya Janata Party
