= Deena Nath Singh Yadav =

Indian politician

Deena Nath Singh Yadav (16 June 1949 - 19 November 2021) was an Indian Marxist politician. He served as a member of Uttar Pradesh State Secretariat of the Communist Party of India (Marxist) from 1991 until the 23rd State Conference in October 2021. From then until his death, he served as the member of Uttar Pradesh State Committee of CPI(M). He also served as the Uttar Pradesh state secretary of the All India Kisan Sabha. He also served as a member of Central Executive Committee of the All India Kisan Sabha.

He won the Gangapur seat in the 1991 Uttar Pradesh Legislative Assembly election. He stood as a Communist Party of India (Marxist) candidate, obtaining 41,899 votes (43.07% of the votes in the constituency).

Singh contested the Varanasi Lok Sabha seat in the 1998 Indian general election. He finished in second place with 125,286 votes (19.42%).

Singh contested the Bhatparrani seat in the 2007 Uttar Pradesh Legislative Assembly election. He obtained 2,028 votes.
