= Baburam M.Com =

Indian politician

Member of Uttar Pradesh Legislative Council
- In office 31 January 2009 – 30 January 2015
- Constituency: elected by Members of Legislative Assembly

Minister of Food & Civil Supplies Government of Uttar Pradesh
- In office 5 May 2002 – 29 August 2003
- Chief Minister: Mayawati

Minister of Small Scale Industries Government of Uttar Pradesh
- In office 27 October 1997 – 8 March 2002
- Chief Minister: Kalyan Singh; Ram Prakash Gupta; Rajnath Singh

Minister of state for Food & Civil Supplies Government of Uttar Pradesh
- In office 19 July 1991 – 6 December 1992
- Chief Minister: Kalyan Singh

Member of Uttar Pradesh Legislative Assembly
- In office 1996–2007
- Preceded by: Akbar Ali
- Succeeded by: Vinod Chaturvedi
- Constituency: Orai
- In office 1991–1993
- Preceded by: Akbar Ali
- Succeeded by: Akbar Ali
- Constituency: Orai

Personal details
- Born: 6 October 1934; Orai, Jalaun district
- Died: 16 December 2015 (aged 81); Lucknow, Lucknow district, Uttar Pradesh
- Political party: Bharatiya Janata Party
- Spouse: Chandravati Gupta (m. 1952)
- Children: 2 sons, 1 daughter
- Parent: Ramsevak Gupta (father)
- Education: Master of Commerce
- Alma mater: University of Allahabad
- Profession: Businessman, Politician

Baburam M.Com (6 October 1934 – 16 December 2015) was an Indian politician from Uttar Pradesh who served as the Minister of Food & Civil Supplies under Mayawati from 2002 to 2003. He had served as the Minister of Small Scale Industry under Kalyan Singh, Ram Prakash Gupta, Rajnath Singh from 1997 to 2002. He had represented Orai Assembly constituency in Uttar Pradesh Legislative Assembly twice 1996-2007 & 1991–93. He had also been the member of Uttar Pradesh Legislative Council from 2009 to 2015.
