= Shriram Sonkar =

Indian politician

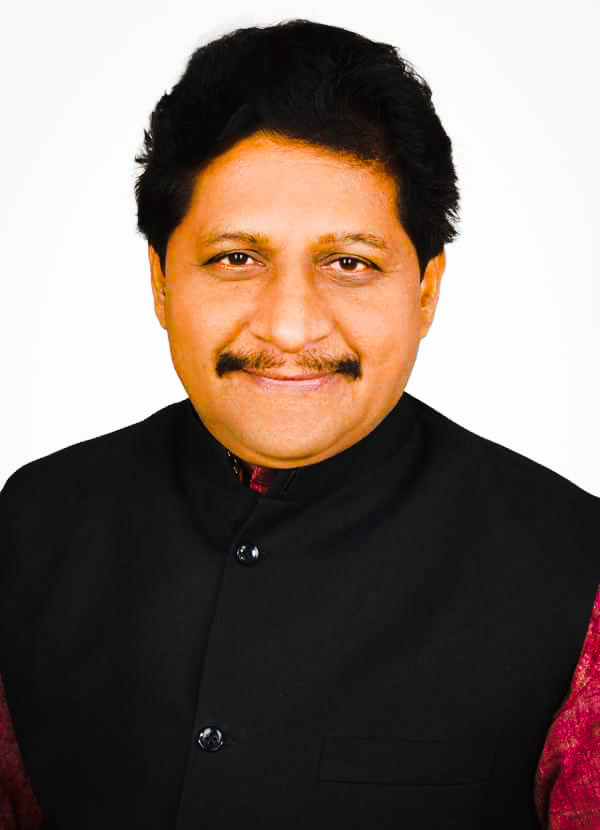

Member of Legislative Assembly of Muhammadabad-Gohna
- In office March 2017 – March 2022
- Preceded by: Baijnath Paswan
- In office October 1996 – March 2002
- Preceded by: Faujdar
- Succeeded by: Baijnath Paswan
- In office June 1991 – December 1992
- Preceded by: Faujdar
- Succeeded by: Faujdar
- Constituency: Muhammadabad-Gohna

Personal details
- Born: 1 July 1962 (age 64) Shahgarh, Azamgarh, Uttar Pradesh
- Party: Bharatiya Janata Party
- Education: Intermediate
- Occupation: MLA
- Profession: Politician, farmer
- Website: https://www.facebook.com/shriram.sonker

Shriram Sonkar (born 1962) is an Indian politician and a member of 11th, 13th and 17th Legislative Assembly, Uttar Pradesh of India. He represents the Muhammadabad-Gohna constituency in Mau district of Uttar Pradesh.

== Political career ==
Shriram Sonkar contested Uttar Pradesh Assembly Election as Bharatiya Janata Party candidate and defeated his close contestant Rajendra Kumar from Bahujan Samaj Party with a margin of 538 votes.

== Posts held ==
#	From	To	Position	Comments
01	March 2017	March 2022	Member, 17th Legislative Assembly	
03	October 1996	March 2002	Member, 13th Legislative Assembly	
02	June 1991	December 1992	Member, 11th Legislative Assembly	

== See also ==
- Uttar Pradesh Legislative Assembly
