= Balrampur, Uttar Pradesh Assembly constituency =

Constituency of the Uttar Pradesh legislative assembly in India

Coordinates: 27.41°N 82.19°E

Balrampur
- Constituency No. 294 for the Uttar Pradesh Legislative Assembly

Constituency details
- Country: India
- Region: North India
- State: Uttar Pradesh
- District: Balrampur
- Total electors: 4,28,009
- Reservation: SC

Member of Legislative Assembly
- 18th Uttar Pradesh Legislative Assembly
- Incumbent Paltu Ram
- Party: BJP
- Elected year: 2022
- Preceded by: Jagram Paswan

Balrampur is an Assembly constituency of the Uttar Pradesh Legislative Assembly, covering the city of Balrampur in the Balrampur district of Uttar Pradesh, India. Balrampur is one of five assembly constituencies in the Shravasti Lok Sabha constituency. Since 2008, this assembly constituency is numbered 294 amongst 403 constituencies.

== Members of the Legislative Assembly ==
Elected year	MLA	Party
1957	Dashrath Prasad	Bharatiya Jana Sangh
1957	Deen Dayal Karun	Indian National Congress
1969	Maheshwar Dutt Singh	Indian National Congress
1974	Man Bahadur Singh	Indian National Congress
1977	Ashfaq	Janata Party
1980	Man Bahadur Singh	Indian National Congress
1985	Man Bahadur Singh	Indian National Congress
1989	Hanumant Singh	Bharatiya Janata Party
1991	Hanumant Singh	Bharatiya Janata Party
1993	Vinay Kumar Pandey	Samajwadi Party
1996	Vinay Kumar Pandey	Indian National Congress
2002	Geeta Singh	Samajwadi Party
2007	Dhirendra Pratap Singh	Bahujan Samaj Party
2012	Jagram Paswan	Samajwadi Party
2017	Paltu Ram	Bharatiya Janata Party
2022	Paltu Ram	Bharatiya Janata Party

== Election results ==
=== 2027 ===
2027 Uttar Pradesh Legislative Assembly election: Balrampur
Party	Candidate	Votes	%	±%
INDIA				
NDA				
BSP				
NOTA	None of the above			
Majority				
Turnout				
gain from		Swing		

=== 2022 ===
2022 Uttar Pradesh Legislative Assembly election: Balrampur
Party	Candidate	Votes	%	±%
BJP	Paltu Ram	101,146	48.93	▲2.68
SP	Jagram Paswan	90,175	43.62	
BSP	Hari Ram	5,371	2.6	▼10.86
INC	Babita	2,576	1.25	▼32.14
NOTA	None of the above	2,365	1.14	▼0.66
Majority		10,971	5.31	▼7.55
Turnout		206,720	48.3	▲1.24
BJP hold		Swing		

=== 2017 ===
Bharatiya Janta Party candidate Paltu Ram won in last Assembly election of 2017 Uttar Pradesh Legislative Elections defeating Indian National Congress candidate Shivlal by a margin of 24,860 votes.

2017 Uttar Pradesh Legislative Assembly election: Balrampur
Party	Candidate	Votes	%	±%
BJP	Paltu Ram	89,401	46.25	
INC	Shivlal	64,541	33.39	
BSP	Ram Sagar Akela	26,011	13.46	
PECP	Shiv Kumar	2,357	1.22	
Mahakranti Dal	Madan Lal	1,798	0.93	
NOTA	None of the above	3,414	1.8	
Majority		24,860	12.86	
Turnout		193,307	47.06	

2012

=== Balrampur ===
The 2012 Uttar Pradesh Legislative Assembly election in the Balrampur (SC) Assembly constituency was won by Jagram Paswan of the Samajwadi Party, who received 47,120 votes. Ramapati Shastri of the Bharatiya Janata Party finished second with 28,858 votes.

Candidate	Party	Votes
Jagram Paswan	Samajwadi Party	47,120
Ramapati Shastri	Bharatiya Janata Party	28,858
Ram Sagar Akela	Bahujan Samaj Party	28,716
Sitaram	Peace Party	23,031

Jagram Paswan defeated Ramapati Shastri by 18,262 votes. The Balrampur Assembly constituency was reserved for Scheduled Castes (SC).

=== 1977 ===
- Ashfaq (JNP) : 18,909 votes
