= Narendra Kumar Singh Gaur =

Indian politician

Minister of Higher Education Government of Uttar Pradesh
- In office 24 June 1991 – 6 December 1992
- Chief Minister: Kalyan Singh

Minister of Labour Government of Uttar Pradesh
- In office 24 June 1991 – 6 December 1992
- Chief Minister: Kalyan Singh

Member of Uttar Pradesh Legislative Assembly
- In office 1991–2007
- Preceded by: Anugrah Narayan Singh
- Succeeded by: Anugrah Narayan Singh
- Constituency: Prayagraj North

Personal details
- Born: 30 May 1943 (age 82) Turtipur, Hardoi district
- Party: Bharatiya Janata Party
- Spouse: Arvind Singh (m. 1967)
- Children: 1 son, 3 daughters
- Parent: Arjun Singh (father)
- Education: M.Sc, D Phil
- Alma mater: University of Allahabad
- Profession: Professor, Politician

Narendra Kumar Singh Gaur is an Indian politician from BJP Uttar Pradesh who had served as the Higher Education & Labour Cabinet Minister under First Kalyan Singh ministry in 1991 and Cabinet Minister for Medical Education, Sugarcane Development & Sugar Industry Department under Chief Minister Shri Rajnath Singh from 2000 - 2002. He served as the member of Uttar Pradesh Legislative Assembly (4 Times MLA) from Prayagraj North constituency from 1991 to 2007.
