= Pradeep Mathur =

Indian politician

Pradeep Mathur प्रदीप माथुर

MLA, 16th Legislative Assembly
- In office Mar 2012 – Mar 2017
- Preceded by: Himself
- Succeeded by: Shrikant Sharma
- Constituency: Mathura

MLA, 15th Legislative Assembly
- In office May 2007 – Mar 2012
- Preceded by: Himself
- Succeeded by: Himself
- Constituency: Mathura

MLA, 14th Legislative Assembly
- In office Feb 2002 – May 2007
- Preceded by: Ram Swaroop Sharma
- Succeeded by: Himself
- Constituency: Mathura

09th Legislative Assembly
- In office Mar 1985 – Nov 1989
- Preceded by: Dayal Krishan
- Succeeded by: Ravikant Garg
- Constituency: Mathura

Personal details
- Born: 25 November 1955 (age 70) Delhi, India
- Party: Indian National Congress
- Education: Dr. Bhimrao Ambedkar University
- Profession: Businessperson, lawyer & politician

Pradeep Mathur (Hindi: प्रदीप माथुर; born 25 November 1955) is an Indian politician and former 4 time MLA from the Mathura constituency of Uttar Pradesh as a member of the Indian National Congress political party.

== Early life and education ==
Pradeep Mathur was born in Delhi. He attended the Dr. Bhimrao Ambedkar University and attained Bachelor of Laws degree.

== Political career ==
Pradeep Mathur has been a MLA for four terms. He represented the Mathura constituency and is a member of the Indian National Congress political party.

== Posts held ==
#	From	To	Position	Comments
01	2012	2017	Member, 16th Legislative Assembly	
02	2007	2012	Member, 15th Legislative Assembly	
03	2002	2007	Member, 14th Legislative Assembly	
04	1985	1989	Member, 09th Legislative Assembly	

== See also ==
- Uttar Pradesh Legislative Assembly
