= Hanumant Singh (politician) =

Indian politician

Minister of Sugarcane Development Government of Uttar Pradesh
- In office 24 June 1991 – 6 December 1992
- Chief Minister: Kalyan Singh

Member of Uttar Pradesh Legislative Assembly
- In office 1989–1993
- Preceded by: Man Bahadur Singh
- Succeeded by: Vinay Kumar Pandey
- Constituency: Balrampur

Personal details
- Born: 1 May 1943 (age 81); Marwatiya Babu, Basti district
- Political party: Bharatiya Janata Party
- Spouse: Rajkumari Singh (m. 1959)
- Children: 1 son, 1 daughter
- Parent: Keshri Singh (father)
- Education: Bachelor of Laws
- Alma mater: Lucknow University
- Profession: Advocate, Politician

Hanumant Singh (born 1 May 1943) is an Indian politician from Uttar Pradesh who served as the Sugarcane Development Minister in First Kalyan Singh ministry in 1991. He served as the Member of Uttar Pradesh Legislative Assembly from Balrampur constituency from 1989 to 1993. Thereafter he lost from Balrampur four terms consecutively in 1993 in 1996 in 2002 and in 2007.
