= First Mulayam Singh Yadav ministry =

Government of Uttar Pradesh, India (1989–91)

- Ministry of Uttar Pradesh
- Date formed: 5 December 1989
- Date dissolved: 24 June 1991

People and organisations
- Chief Minister: Mulayam Singh Yadav
- Member party: Janata Dal

History
- Predecessor: N. D. Tiwari
- Successor: Kalyan Singh

This is the Uttar Pradesh Council of Ministers headed by the Chief Minister of Uttar Pradesh, Mulayam Singh Yadav from 1989 to 1991.

== Council of ministers ==
Name	Office	Portfolio	Took office	Left office	Party
Mulayam Singh Yadav	Chief Minister	Chief Minister	5 December 1989	24 June 1991	Janata Dal
Rewati Raman Singh	Cabinet minister	Irrigation, Medium Enterprises, Environment	5 December 1989	24 June 1991	Janata Dal
Ram Sharan Dass	Cabinet minister	Sugarcane Development, Revenue	5 December 1989	24 June 1991	Janata Dal
Beni Prasad Verma	Cabinet minister	Public Works, Parliamentary Affairs, Excise	5 December 1989	24 June 1991	Janata Dal
Sachidanand Bajpai	Cabinet minister	Education, Youth Development	5 December 1989	24 June 1991	Janata Dal
Mukhtar Anis	Cabinet minister	Public Health, Medical	5 December 1989	24 June 1991	Janata Dal
Sukhda Mishra	Cabinet minister	Rural Development, Panchayati Raj	5 December 1989	24 June 1991	Janata Dal
Avdhesh Prasad	Cabinet minister	Harijan and Social Welfare	5 December 1989	24 June 1991	Janata Dal
Diwakar Vikram Singh	Cabinet minister	Food and Logistics	5 December 1989	24 June 1991	Janata Dal
Azam Khan	Cabinet minister	Labour, Muslim Wakf	5 December 1989	24 June 1991	Janata Dal
Vikramaditya Pandey	Cabinet minister	Urban Development	5 December 1989	24 June 1991	Janata Dal
Barfiya Lal Juwantha	Cabinet minister	Hill Development	5 December 1989	24 June 1991	Janata Dal
Mohd Aslam Khan	Cabinet minister	Forest, Sports	5 December 1989	24 June 1991	Janata Dal
Shatrudra Prakash	Cabinet minister	Planning, Prison	5 December 1989	24 June 1991	Janata Dal
