= Agra North Assembly constituency =

Vidhan Sabha constituency in Uttar Pradesh

Agra North ( आगरा उत्तर )
- Constituency No. 89 for the Uttar Pradesh Legislative Assembly

Constituency details
- Country: India
- Region: North India
- State: Uttar Pradesh
- District: Agra
- Established: 2008
- Total electors: 4,09,578 (2019)
- Reservation: None

Member of Legislative Assembly
- 18th Uttar Pradesh Legislative Assembly
- Incumbent Purshottam Khandelwal
- Party: Bharatiya Janata Party
- Elected year: 2017

Agra North Assembly constituency is one of the 403 constituencies of the Uttar Pradesh Legislative Assembly, India. It is a part of the Agra district and one of the five assembly constituencies in the Agra Lok Sabha constituency. First assembly election in this assembly constituency was conducted in 2012 after the constituency came into existence in the year 2008 as a result of the "Delimitation of Parliamentary and Assembly Constituencies Order, 2008".

== Wards / Areas ==
Agra North Assembly constituency comprises Dayalbagh and Swamibagh (Nagar parishad)s, ward numbers 1, 5, 22, 26, 27, 31, 32, 33, 35, 38, 42, 43, 45, 48, 51, 55, 62, 66, 70, 78 & 79 in Agra municipal corporation.

== Members of the Legislative Assembly ==
Year	Member	Party
2012	Jagan Prasad Garg	Bharatiya Janata Party
2017	Jagan Prasad Garg	Bharatiya Janata Party
2019*	Purshottam Khandelwal	Bharatiya Janata Party
2022	Purshottam Khandelwal	Bharatiya Janata Party

- *By Election

== Election results ==
=== 2027 ===
2027 Uttar Pradesh Legislative Assembly election: Agra North
Party	Candidate	Votes	%	±%
INDIA				
NDA				
BSP				
NOTA	None of the above			
Majority				
Turnout				
gain from		Swing		

=== 2022 ===
2022 Uttar Pradesh Legislative Assembly election: Agra North
Party	Candidate	Votes	%	±%
BJP	Purshottam Khandelwal	153,817	63.89	▲5.34
BSP	Shabbir Abbas	41,447	17.22	▼3.93
SP	Gyanendra Gautam	34,403	14.29	▼1.63
INC	Vinod Kumar Bansal	5,933	2.46	
NOTA	None of the above	1,608	0.67	▲0.12
Majority		112,370	46.67	▲9.27
Turnout		240,752	55.27	▼3.08
BJP hold		Swing		

=== 2019 bypoll ===
By-election, 2019: Agra North
Party	Candidate	Votes	%	±%
BJP	Purshottam Khandelwal	105,762	64.97	+6.42
SP	Suraj Sharma	45,731	28.09	+12.17
INC	Ranvir Sharma	7,040	4.32	N/A
Pragatisheel Samajwadi Party (Lohiya)	Dileep Kumar Baghel	1,515	0.93	N/A
Vanchit Samaj Insaaf Party	Rashid Ali Chaudhary	742	0.46	N/A
NOTA	None of the Above	807	0.50	−0.05
Majority		60,031	36.88	−0.52
Turnout		1,62,781	39.74	−18.61
BJP hold		Swing	+6.42	

=== 2017 ===
2017 Uttar Pradesh Legislative Assembly election: Agra North
Party	Candidate	Votes	%	±%
BJP	Jagan Prasad Garg	135,120	58.55	
BSP	Gyanendra Gautam	48,800	21.15	
SP	Atul Garg	36,739	15.92	
Independent	Kundanika Sharma	3,275	1.42	
NOTA	None of the above	1,266	0.55	
Majority		86,320	37.4	
Turnout		230,769	58.35	
BJP hold		Swing	+23.78	

=== 2012 ===
2012 Uttar Pradesh Legislative Assembly election: Agra North
Party	Candidate	Votes	%	±%
BJP	Jagan Prasad Garg	68,401	34.77	−
BSP	Rajesh Kumar Agrawal	45,045	22.90	−
INC	Sumeet Gupta Bibhab	38,258	19.45	−
SP	Abhinav Sharma	29,499	15.00	−
RSMD	Hari Om Chaudhary	5,478	2.78	−
IND.	Amit Kumar Diwakar	2,641	1.34	−
Majority		23,356	11.87	−
Turnout		1,96,716	55.34	−
BJP win (new seat)				

== See also ==
- Agra district
- Agra (Graduates constituency)
- Agra Lok Sabha constituency
- Government of Uttar Pradesh
- List of Vidhan Sabha constituencies of Uttar Pradesh
- Uttar Pradesh
- Uttar Pradesh Legislative Assembly
