= Suraj Singh Shakya =

Former minister of State in Government of Uttar Pradesh

Member of the Uttar Pradesh Legislative Assembly
- In office 1991–1993
- Constituency: Sakit Assembly constituency
- In office 1993–1996
- In office 2002–2007
- In office 2007–2012

Personal details
- Born: 2 January 1939 (age 87) Khiria Patti village, Etah district
- Party: Bharatiya Janata Party
- Other political affiliations: Samajwadi Party
- Spouse: Nirmala Shakya
- Parent: Pyare Lal Shakya (father)

Suraj Singh Shakya was an Indian politician and a member of Uttar Pradesh Legislative Assembly, who was elected to 12th Uttar Pradesh Legislative Assembly as a candidate of Bharatiya Janata Party. He was elected to Uttar Pradesh Legislative Assembly from Sakit Assembly constituency of Etah district of Uttar Pradesh. He also served as Minister of State for Cooperatives in Government of Uttar Pradesh during 1991–92. Shakya has served as M.L.A for four terms. He was first elected in 1991 and was subsequently re-elected in 1993 elections. After his second term, there was a gap and his third term came in 2002, which was followed by his victory in 2007 Assembly elections as well. Besides Bharatiya Janata Party, he has also represented Samajwadi Party in Uttar Pradesh Assembly.

== Life and political career ==
Suraj Singh Shakya was born to Pyare Lal Shakya, a former member of Uttar Pradesh Legislative Assembly in Khiria Patti village of Etah district of Uttar Pradesh. As per his candidate affidavit submitted to Election Commission of India, he identifies himself to be a member of Other Backward Class Shakya caste. He completed his master's degree in Arts, Commerce and thereafter completed his law course, before getting diploma in cooperation. On 20 May 1964, he was married to Nirmala Shakya. They had three sons and a daughter from the marriage.

His first electoral victory came in year 1991, which was followed by his second victory in 1993 on the ticket of Bharatiya Janata Party. From July 1991 to December 1992, he also served as Minister of State for Cooperatives in Kalyan Singh ministry. He participated in 'Ram Janmbhoomi movement' and in the context of his activism during this movement, he was imprisoned twice at Mainpuri and Delhi. From 1961 to 1985, he also served as Senior Auditor in Uttar Pradesh Cooperative Audit Organization. He is the founder of Little Angels school in Agra.

Shakya's third stint as a Member of the Uttar Pradesh Legislative Assembly came in the year 2002, and he served as M.L.A. from 2002-2007. He was elected this time on the ticket of Samajwadi Party. In the year 2003, he was again made a minister in Mulayam Singh Yadav government. His last term in Uttar Pradesh Legislative Assembly was from 2007-2012. He defeated Neeraj Kishore of Bahujan Samaj Party in his last assembly election.

In 2019, he contested the Lok Sabha elections on the ticket of Jan Adhikar Party of Babu Singh Kushwaha, but lost badly to Rajveer Singh, son of former Uttar Pradesh Chief Minister Kalyan Singh.
