= Ganga Bhakt Singh =

Indian politician

Ganga Bhakt Singh (1922–2010) was a senior leader of Bharatiya Janata Party from Uttar Pradesh, India, affiliated to the Rashtriya Swayamsevak Sangh. He was founding member of BJP when BJP party was formed in 1980. He served as a cabinet minister twice in the Government of Uttar Pradesh in 1967 (PWD Minister under the Chief Minister Chaudhary Charan Singh ) and 1991 (Agriculture Minister under the Chief Minister Kalyan Singh) and as the Deputy-Chairman of the State Planning Commission between 2000 and 2002 under the Chief Minister Rajnath Singh. He was a member of the Sixth Lok Sabha from Shahabad Lok Sabha constituency as well as being a member of the Uttar Pradesh Legislative Assembly for 4 terms. He contested MLA elections 8 times and MP election one time. He had cleared UPPCS exam and he was selected for Deputy Superintendent of Police but he didn't join the service.

He became State President of Jan Sangh in 1972 by defeating Shri Murli Manohar Joshi ji in UP. He became Vice President and General Secretary of Jan Sangh in UP. Ex- Prime Minister Shri Atal Bihari Vajpayee worked as General Secretary when Ganga Bhakt Singh was State President of Jan Sangh in UP. He also served as President of UP Handloom Commission. He also served as Vice President of Janta Party UP during 1977. He also served as President of UP Rajya Mandi Parishad in 1989. He had established several schools like Bhartiya Inter College Pihani, Hariyawan Inter College, SGRB Inter College Pali etc for educational upliftment of rural students.

His elder brother, Late Shri. Sharda Bhakt Singh was also a senior leader of the Bhartiya Janta Party and had served as the Revenue Minister (Cabinet Minister) of Uttar Pradesh under Chief Minister Shri Ram Naresh Yadav in 1977 and 4 times MLA . He was Leader of Opposition in UP Vidhan Sabha in 1964 (1 Years 2 Months). He also served as Chairman (2 Times) of Hardoi Nagar Palika.

An active social and political worker, Singh was a bachelor and was associated with the organisational work of a number of societies in his constituency and worked for the uplift of rural people.

Singh died on 15 August 2010 at Lucknow, Uttar Pradesh at the age of 88.
