= Brahm Dutt Dwivedi =

Indian politician

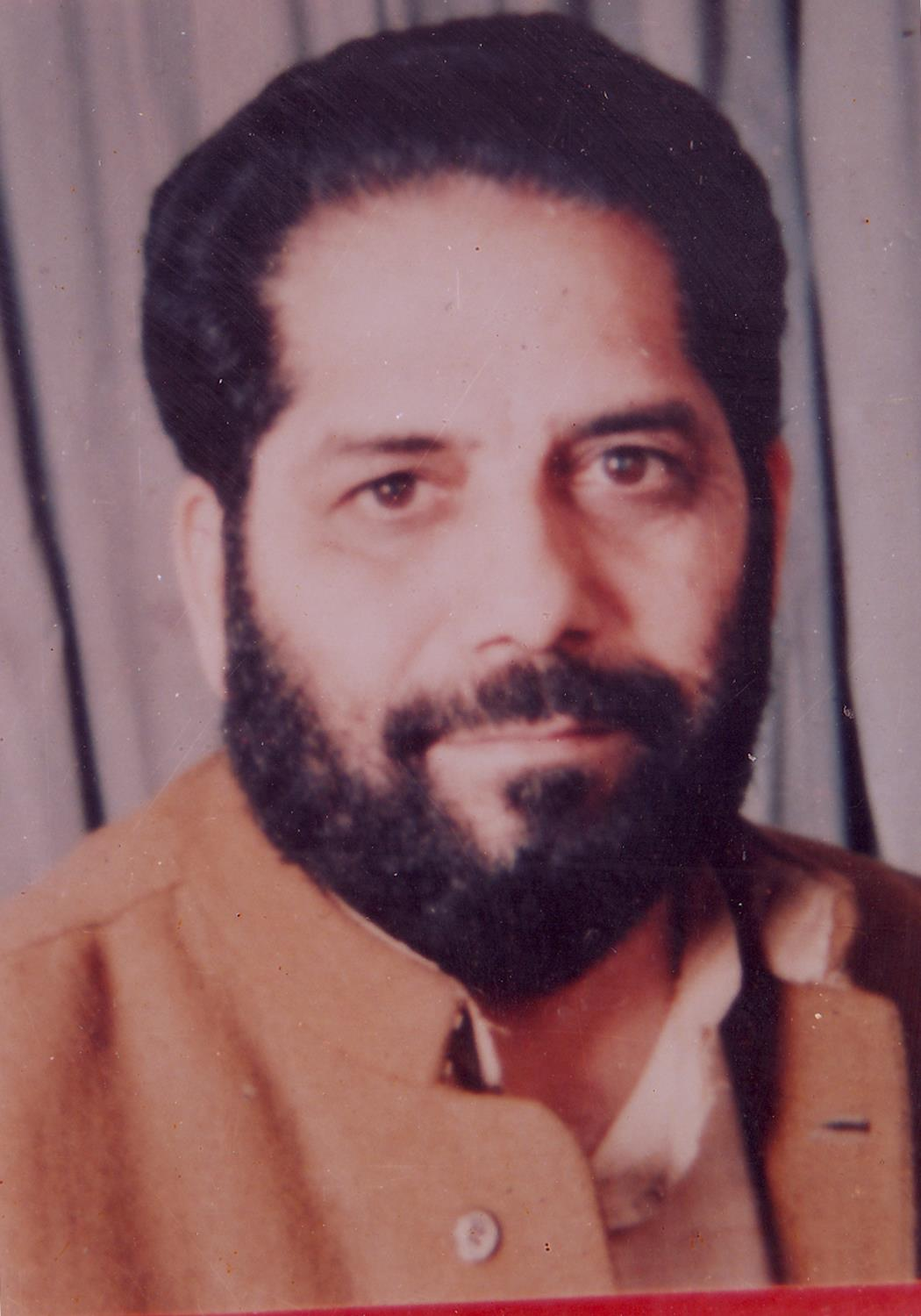

Cabinet Minister Government of Uttar Pradesh
- In office 24 June 1991 – 6 December 1992
- Chief Minister: Kalyan Singh
- Ministry & Department's: Revenue; Power

Member of Uttar Pradesh Legislative Assembly
- In office 1991–1997
- Preceded by: Vimal Prasad Tiwari
- Succeeded by: Prabha Dwivedi
- Constituency: Farrukhabad
- In office 1985–1989
- Preceded by: Vimal Prasad Tiwari
- Succeeded by: Vimal Prasad Tiwari
- Constituency: Farrukhabad
- In office 1977–1980
- Preceded by: Vimal Prasad Tiwari
- Succeeded by: Vimal Prasad Tiwari
- Constituency: Farrukhabad

Personal details
- Born: 15 January 1938 Amritpur, Uttar Pradesh
- Died: 10 February 1997 (aged 59)
- Party: Bharatiya Janata Party
- Spouse: Prabha Dwivedi (m. 1962–1997)
- Relations: Pranshu Dutt Dwivedi (nephew)
- Children: Sunil Dutt Dwivedi; Garima Agnihotri; Priyank Dutt Dwivedi
- Parent: Sri Ram Dwivedi (father)
- Education: M.A., LLB
- Occupation: Politician

Brahm Dutt Dwivedi (1938–1997) was an Indian cabinet minister in Government of Uttar Pradesh, and a senior leader of the Bharatiya Janata Party. Dwivedi was shot dead in Farrukhabad district in February 1997. His wife Mrs Prabha later contested the election to the assembly. He protected Mayawati against physical assault during the 2 June 1995 guest house scandal.

== Death ==
Dwivedi, who was then sitting BJP MLA from Farrukhabad, was shot in his car after attending a tilak ceremony on February 10, 1997, in City Kotwali area. His bodyguard BK Tiwari was killed in the attack, while his driver Rinku suffered injuries. Dwivedi was rushed to the local hospital, but was declared dead on arrival. Former prime minister Atal Bihari Vajpayee, former BJP president Lal Krishna Advani, former Home Minister Murli Manohar Joshi, Defence Minister Rajnath Singh, former UP chief minister Kalyan Singh and state BJP president Kalraj Mishra attended Dwivedi's funeral.

== Investigation and conviction ==
The assassination case was investigated by the CBI. On July 17, 2003, the CBI court in Lucknow had sentenced gangster Sanjeev Maheshwari and former Samajwadi Party MLA Vijay Singh to life imprisonment in the case. Both convicts had challenged the judgment and filed an appeal in the high court. In 2017, the Lucknow bench of Allahabad High Court upheld the trial court judgment of life imprisonment. In 2018, the case moved to Supreme Court.
