= Sarjeet Singh Dang =

Indian politician

Dr S S Dang
- Constituency: Mirzapur

Personal details
- Born: 20 February 1947 (age 79) Mirzapur, Uttar Pradesh
- Party: Bharatiya Janata Party
- Children: 1 son and 1 daughter

Sarjeet Singh Dang (b 1947) is a leader of Bharatiya Janata Party from Uttar Pradesh. He was a member of Uttar Pradesh Legislative Assembly elected from Mirzapur in 1989, 1991, 1993 and 1996. He served as cabinet minister in the ministry headed by Kalyan Singh in 1991–92. Dang graduated as MBBS in 1968 and then worked at Benaras Hindu University.
