= Ramapati Shastri =

Indian politician

Minister of Social Welfare, SC/ST Welfare Government of Uttar Pradesh
- In office 19 March 2017 – 25 March 2022
- Chief Minister: Yogi Adityanath
- Succeeded by: Asim Arun
- In office 24 June 1991 – 6 December 1992
- Chief Minister: Kalyan Singh

Minister of Health & Family Welfare Government of Uttar Pradesh
- In office 23 March 1997 – 8 March 2002
- Chief Minister: Mayawati; Kalyan Singh

Member of Uttar Pradesh Legislative Assembly
- Incumbent
- Assumed office 2017
- Preceded by: Babulal
- Constituency: Manakpur
- In office 1989–2002
- Preceded by: Babulal
- Succeeded by: Babulal
- Constituency: Dixir
- In office 1974–1980
- Succeeded by: Babulal
- Constituency: Dixir

Personal details
- Born: 15 October 1952 (age 73) Bishnoharpur, Gonda, Uttar Pradesh
- Party: Bharatiya Janata Party
- Spouse: Mangala Devi (deceased)
- Children: 2
- Profession: Politician

Ramapati Shastri is an Indian politician and a member of the 6th, 7th, 10th, 11th, 12th, 13th, and 17th Legislative Assembly of Uttar Pradesh of India. Currently, he is serving as Cabinet Minister of Social Welfare and Minister of SC & ST Welfare in the Yogi Adityanath government. He represents the Mankapur (Assembly constituency) in Gonda district of Uttar Pradesh and is a member of the Bharatiya Janata Party. He is also elected as Pro tem Speaker of 18th Uttar Pradesh Legislative Assembly.

== Early life and education ==
Shastri was born on 15 October 1952 in Bishnoharpur village of the Gonda district to his father Ram Laut who belongs to tanbina gotra of Kori/koli caste. He married Lt. Mangla Devi, with whom he has one son and one daughter. He passed high school and intermediate examination from Gandhi Inter College, Nawabganj. In 1984, he received the degree of Shastri from Sampurnanand Sanskrit University, Varanasi.

== Political career ==
Shastri has been MLA for seven strength terms. In 1974, his first election, he became an MLA on the Jan Sangh ticket from the Dixir reserved seat. He lost the elections to the Babulal of Congress in 1980 and 1985. In 1989, he became MLA from BJP for the third time. Fourth time after winning elections in Ramlahar in 1991, he was made a cabinet minister in Kalyan Singh's government. During this tenure, he held the Ministry of Social Welfare and Revenue Department. The fifth time he again won the election in 1993 from Diksir. In 1996, after winning for the sixth time he was again appointed Cabinet Minister for Medical Health and Family Welfare Department in the BJP government. In the 2002 election, he lost to SP's Babulal. During this time, the BJP made him the National President of the Scheduled Castes Morcha. In the 2007 election, he lost to Bahujan Samaj Party candidate Ramesh Gautam.

In 2012, the Dixir assembly seat came out of the reservation in the name of Tarabganj. This time Shastri contested from Balrampur Sadar and secured the seat, but lost. Since 2017, he has represented the Mankapur (Assembly constituency) in the Gonda district of Uttar Pradesh and is a member of the Bhartiya Janta Party. In the 2017 elections, he defeated his nearest rival Bahujan Samaj Party candidate Ramesh Chandra Gautam by a record margin of 60,161 votes.

== Posts held ==
#	From	To	Position	Comments	Ref
11	March 2022	March 2022	Pro tem speaker, Uttar Pradesh Assembly	Yogi Adityanath Cabinet	
10	March 2017	Incumbent	Cabinet Minister in Government of Uttar Pradesh	Yogi Adityanath Cabinet	
09	March 2017	Incumbent	Member, 17th Legislative Assembly	7th term	
08	October 1996	March 2002	Member, 13th Legislative Assembly	6th term	
07	September 1997	November 1999	Cabinet Minister in Government of Uttar Pradesh	Kalyan Singh Cabinet	
06	December 1993	October 1995	Member, 12th Legislative Assembly	5th term	
05	June 1991	December 1992	Member, 11th Legislative Assembly	4th term	
04	June 1991	December 1992	Cabinet Minister in Government of Uttar Pradesh	Kalyan Singh Cabinet	
03	December 1989	April 1991	Member, 10th Legislative Assembly	3rd term	
02	June 1977	February 1980	Member, 7th Legislative Assembly	2nd term	
01	March 1974	April 1977	Member, 6th Legislative Assembly	1st term	

== See also ==
- Uttar Pradesh Legislative Assembly
