= Ravi Kant Garg =

Indian politician

- Occupation: Politician

Ravi Kant Garg is a leader of Bharatiya Janata Party Garg and a former member of the Uttar Pradesh Legislative Assembly representing Mathura (Assembly constituency). He was Minister of State in the BJP government in 1991 under chief ministership of Kalyan Singh. Yogi Adityanath government recently appointed him as head of an 11-member Uttar Pradesh Vyapari Kalyan Board.
