= Prem Lata Katiyar =

Indian politician

Prem Lata Katiyar प्रेम लता कटियार

UP
- Constituency: Kalyanpur

Personal details
- Born: 1 January 1946; Farrukhabad (Uttar Pradesh)
- Political party: Bharatiya Janata Party

Prem Lata Katiyar (born January 1, 1946) is an Indian politician and former cabinet minister in the Government of Uttar Pradesh.

== Life ==
Katiyar is originally from the Kurmi caste. She has been elected MLA from Kalyanpur Vidhansabha five times and Minister three times. She is the current Vice-President of Bharatiya Janata Party (BJP) Uttar Pradesh unit, and an ex MLA from Kanpur. Premlata Katiyar has been a minister in governments in Uttar Pradesh headed by Kalyan Singh, Ram Prakash Gupta, Raj Nath Singh and Kumari Mayawati (when the BSP had a tie-up with the BJP).

Katiyar has been representing Kanpur's Kalyanpur Assembly seat (under which IIT-Kanpur falls) continuously since 1991. Premlata's association with the BJP began with the anti-emergency movement. Her daughter, Neelima Katiyar, is now MLA from Kalyanpur and office-bearer in the state unit of Bharatiya Janata Yuva Morcha.
