= 3rd Uttar Pradesh Assembly =

The Third Legislative Assembly of Uttar Pradesh (a.k.a.Third Vidhan Sabha of Uttar Pradesh) was constituted on 7 March 1962 as a result of 1962 Uttar Pradesh Legislative Assembly election which was concluded on 19 February 1957. The Third Legislative Assembly had 430 elected MLAs. The assembly was in house for full term of five years before being dissolved on 9 Mar 1967.

== Party wise strength ==
| | Party | 1962 | |
|---|---|---|---|
| 1 | Indian National Congress | INC | 249 |
| 2 | Bhartiya Jana Sangh | BJS | 49 |
| 4 | Independent | IND | 31 |
| 3 | Praja Socialist Party | PSP | 38 |
| 5 | Communist Party of India | CPI | 14 |
| 6 | Socialist Party of India | SOC | 24 |
| 7 | Swatantra Party | SWA | 15 |
| 8 | Republican Party of India | RPI | 8 |
| 9 | Hindu Mahasabha | HMS | 2 |
| Total | | | 430 |

== List of constituencies and elected members ==
| ID | Assembly constituency | Reserved | Winner | Party | Votes | Runner up | Party | Votes |
|---|---|---|---|---|---|---|---|---|
| 1 | Uttarkashi | None | Krishna Singh | INC | 16132 | Kamla Ram | IND | 3207 |
| 2 | Tehri | None | Trepan Singh | INC | 16887 | Vidya Sagar | CPI | 4287 |
| 3 | Deoprayag | None | Vinaya Laxmi | INC | 9901 | Gyan Singh | IND | 5974 |
| 4 | Ganga Salan | None | Jagmohan Singh Negi | INC | 13984 | Bhairab Datt Dhulia | IND | 12398 |
| 5 | Lansdowne | None | Mukandi Lal | INC | 16934 | Ram Prasad | INC | 11353 |
| 6 | Pauri | None | Chandra Singh | INC | 13015 | Kunwar Singh | IND | 2979 |
| 7 | Kedarnath | None | Gangadhar | PSP | 9320 | Narendra Singh Bhandari | INC | 8540 |
| 8 | Badrinath | None | Yogeshwar Prasad Khanduri | INC | 10584 | Ram Prasad Bahuguna | IND | 6870 |
| 9 | Pithoragarh | None | Narendra Singh | INC | 8847 | Lila Ram | PSP | 6584 |
| 10 | Champawat | SC | Khushi Ram | INC | 6370 | Jayant Lal | PSP | 5457 |
| 11 | Danpur | None | Mohan Singh | INC | 9085 | Hayat Singh | BJS | 6011 |
| 12 | Almora | None | Ganga Singh | INC | 17545 | Govind Singh | BJS | 11555 |
| 13 | Ranikhet North | None | Hari Datt | INC | 10911 | Nandan Singh | CPI | 3924 |
| 14 | Ranikhet South | None | Chandra Bhanu Gupta | INC | 22516 | Balwant Singh | PSP | 2523 |
| 15 | Nainital | None | Devendra Singh | INC | 19906 | Narain Datt | PSP | 14063 |
| 16 | Tanakpur | None | Anisur Rahman | INC | 10913 | Pratap Singh | PSP | 10396 |
| 17 | Kashipur | None | Debi Datt | INC | 26077 | Ram Datt | PSP | 21394 |
| 18 | Afzalgarh | None | Basant Singh | BJS | 14634 | Sadruddin | INC | 13989 |
| 19 | Najibabad | None | Shri Ram | BJS | 24764 | Atiqul Rehman | INC | 22295 |
| 20 | Bijnor | None | Satya Vir | INC | 21472 | Nepal Singh | SWA | 8755 |
| 21 | Chandpur | None | Nardeo Singh | IND | 12141 | Chandan Singh | CPI | 10982 |
| 22 | Nagina | None | Govind Sahay | INC | 21896 | Naubahar Singh | BJS | 11486 |
| 23 | Dhampur | None | Khub Singh | INC | 18824 | Amiri Singh | SOC | 11230 |
| 24 | Boodpur | SC | Girdhari Lal | INC | 24478 | Mukandi Singh | BJS | 18678 |
| 25 | Kanth | None | Daudayal Khanna | INC | 15534 | Khyali Ram | IND | 7636 |
| 26 | Amroha | None | Sharafat Husain Rizvi | CPI | 13570 | Shahzade Lal | BJS | 10397 |
| 27 | Hasanpur North | None | Jagdish Prasad | INC | 10470 | Yusaf Ali Khan | SWA | 9475 |
| 28 | Hasanpur South | SC | Sukhan Lal | INC | 10253 | Javar Singh | IND | 7842 |
| 29 | Sambhal | None | Mahmood Hasan Khan | REP | 21568 | Mahesh Chandra | BJS | 16834 |
| 30 | Bahjoi | None | Bishan Lal | PSP | 14729 | Jagdish Saran | INC | 8545 |
| 31 | Chandausi | None | Narendra Singh | IND | 15853 | Davendra Kumar | SOC | 8960 |
| 32 | Bilari | SC | Het Ram | PSP | 13319 | Mahi Lal | INC | 11445 |
| 33 | Moradabad City | None | Halimuddin | REP | 21816 | Brahma Swarup | BJS | 17843 |
| 34 | Moradabad Rural | None | Riasat Husain | PSP | 13204 | Shiv Shankar Trivedi | INC | 9995 |
| 35 | Thakurdwara | None | Ram Pal Singh | INC | 17284 | Ahmadullah | SWA | 15345 |
| 36 | Suar Tanda | None | Mahmood Ali Khan | INC | 13508 | Maqsood Husain | IND | 12577 |
| 37 | Rampur City | None | Kishwar Ara Begum | INC | 25314 | Fazalul Haque | IND | 3791 |
| 38 | Rampur Rural | None | Kalyan Rai | INC | 16158 | Sohan Lal | PSP | 8707 |
| 39 | Shahabad | SC | Baldeo Singh Arya | INC | 14873 | Ram Charan | BJS | 10149 |
| 40 | Bisauli | None | Shive Raj Singh | INC | 11014 | Shiam Singh | PSP | 10574 |
| 41 | Kot | SC | Kesho Ram | INC | 17140 | Chunni Lal | BJS | 10328 |
| 42 | Islamnagar | None | Surajpal Singh | INC | 13205 | Moti Ram | BJS | 11549 |
| 43 | Gunnaur | None | Jugal Kishore | PSP | 11654 | Karan Singh S/O Tirbeni Singh | INC | 11071 |
| 44 | Sahaswan | None | Ulfat Singh | BJS | 11588 | Mushtaq Ali Khan | INC | 10212 |
| 45 | Ujhani | None | Purushotam Lal Badhwar (Rajaji) | REP | 27055 | Shri Krishna Goyal | INC | 21114 |
| 46 | Usehat | None | Nirottam Singh | IND | 11521 | Brij Pal Singh | BJS | 7976 |
| 47 | Dataganj | None | Narain Singh | BJS | 12946 | Harish Chandra Singh | INC | 11418 |
| 48 | Budaun | None | Rukum Singh | INC | 16098 | Asrar Ahmad | IND | 14490 |
| 49 | Aonla | None | Nawal Kishore | INC | 15424 | Aidal Singh | BJS | 10633 |
| 50 | Sirauli | None | Vaidya Dharam Dutt | INC | 11636 | Bhagwan Sahai | IND | 11301 |
| 51 | Baheri | None | Ram Moorti | INC | 22401 | Chheda Lal | PSP | 17839 |
| 52 | Bhojipura | None | Harish Kumar Gangwar | BJS | 10378 | Babu Ram | INC | 9683 |
| 53 | Bareilly City | None | Jagdish Saran Agarwal | INC | 18906 | Satya Prakash | BJS | 12809 |
| 54 | Bareilly Cantonment | None | Mohammad Hussain | INC | 9206 | Ashfaq Ahmad | IND | 7802 |
| 55 | Sanha | None | Rameshwar Nath Alias Choubey | IND | 14605 | Nathoo Singh | INC | 8398 |
| 56 | Faridpur | SC | Hem Raj | BJS | 14303 | Sunder Lal | INC | 8255 |
| 57 | Nawabganj | None | Naurang Lal | INC | 14344 | Chet Ram | IND | 12870 |
| 58 | Pilibhit | None | Ram Roop Singh | INC | 10939 | Nafis Ahmed | CPI | 10020 |
| 59 | Puranpur | None | Mohan Lal Acharya | INC | 13681 | Harish Chandra | BJS | 13527 |
| 60 | Bisalpur | SC | Durga Prasad | INC | 8323 | Behari Lal | PSP | 7480 |
| 61 | Tilhar | None | Bhagwan Sahai | IND | 18121 | Mohammad Sayeed | IND | 9356 |
| 62 | Khera Bajhera | None | Surendra Vikram | INC | 13821 | Amar Singh | PSP | 10561 |
| 63 | Jalalabad | None | Kesho Singh | INC | 10402 | Kanahi Singh | SOC | 6908 |
| 64 | Jamuar | None | Ram Murti Anchal | INC | 10747 | Dev Narayan Bhartiya | IND | 6154 |
| 65 | Shahjahanpur | None | Rafi Khan | INC | 16889 | Darshan Singh Sardar | IND | 13408 |
| 66 | Powayan | None | Raja Vikaram Shah | IND | 11558 | Shiv Kumar | INC | 7441 |
| 67 | Khutar | SC | Kandhai Lal | IND | 5113 | Kamlesh Chandra | INC | 3017 |
| 68 | Nighasan | None | Ram Charan Shah | BJS | 21419 | Karan Singh | INC | 12458 |
| 69 | Dhaurahra | None | Tej Narain | INC | 23047 | Jagannath Prasad | PSP | 15305 |
| 70 | Kheri | None | Bankata Singh Alias Tunnu Singh | INC | 13852 | Chet Ram | BJS | 11714 |
| 71 | Srinagar | None | Banshidhar Misra | INC | 13735 | Krishna Pramod Tewari Alias Bachha Babu | PSP | 7300 |
| 72 | Palia | SC | Chheda Lal Chudhri | INC | 14390 | Chhedi Lal | PSP | 7129 |
| 73 | Haiderabad | None | Ram Bhajan | INC | 17516 | Jagdish Narain Dutta Singh | BJS | 13678 |
| 74 | Mohammadi | SC | Manna Lal | BJS | 16590 | Hardwari Lal | INC | 15089 |
| 75 | Misrikh | None | Awadhesh Kumar | SOC | 16221 | Ram Ratan Singh | INC | 13622 |
| 76 | Sitapur | None | Sharda Nand | BJS | 24710 | Harish Chandra | INC | 14574 |
| 77 | Laharpur | None | Bipin Behari Tewari | BJS | 15273 | Bashir Ahmad | INC | 10309 |
| 78 | Tambaur | SC | Ganeshi Lal | INC | 11541 | Mangal Prasad | BJS | 10172 |
| 79 | Biswan | None | Gaya Prasad | BJS | 24240 | Suresh Prakash Singh | INC | 15710 |
| 80 | Mahmudabad | None | Shivendra Pratap | BJS | 11714 | Ilahi Bux | IND | 9813 |
| 81 | Bari | SC | Baiju Ram | INC | 13495 | Ram Pal | BJS | 12347 |
| 82 | Khairabad | None | Tambreshwari Prasad | BJS | 23868 | Tara Chand Maheshwari | INC | 20740 |
| 83 | Machhrehta | SC | Dalla Ram | INC | 9764 | Jawahir Lal | BJS | 7534 |
| 84 | Gondwa | None | Mohan Lal | INC | 24780 | Rajendra Singh | BJS | 19479 |
| 85 | Sandila | SC | Pancham | IND | 7827 | Shambhoo Dayal | INC | 5879 |
| 86 | Mallawan | None | J. P. Mishra | INC | 18289 | Surendra Vikram | BJS | 11142 |
| 87 | Bilgram | None | Kala Rani | INC | 15800 | Sardar Singh | BJS | 11162 |
| 88 | Hardoi | None | Mahesh Singh | INC | 13510 | Meheshwar Bux Singh | BJS | 8452 |
| 89 | Gopamau | SC | Parmai | BJS | 10534 | Prabhu Dayal | INC | 10274 |
| 90 | Shahabad | None | Piarey Lal | BJS | 23655 | Vidya Wati | INC | 13896 |
| 91 | Shiroman Nagar | SC | Pooran Lal | BJS | 12700 | Kanhaiya Lal Balmi | INC | 10554 |
| 92 | Pali | None | Bhakt Singh Sarda | BJS | 21475 | Harhar Bux Singh | INC | 15548 |
| 93 | Bangarmau | SC | Sewa Ram | INC | 10947 | Mulla Prasad Hans | CPI | 4684 |
| 94 | Safipur | None | Gopi Nath | INC | 8138 | Shiva Gopal | IND | 3154 |
| 95 | Unnao | None | Ziaur Rehman Alias Wakkan | INC | 11481 | Khajan Singh | PSP | 10500 |
| 96 | Bhagwant Nagar | None | Dev Datt | INC | 18271 | Bhagwati Singh Visharad | PSP | 15987 |
| 97 | Purwa | None | Ram Adhin Singh | INC | 10190 | Hansraj | BJS | 6928 |
| 98 | Jhalotar Ajgain | None | Sri Ram | INC | 11340 | Sajiwan Lal | CPI | 9545 |
| 99 | Hasanganj | SC | Bhikkha Lal | CPI | 11184 | Sia Ram | INC | 9705 |
| 100 | Malihabad | None | Ram Pal Trivedi | INC | 14056 | Ahmed Wali Khan | CPI | 13705 |
| 101 | Mahona | SC | Sukh Lal | BJS | 14738 | Basat Lal | INC | 13612 |
| 102 | Lucknow City East | None | Kishori Lal Agarwal | INC | 25868 | Ramesh Chandra Sharma | BJS | 14789 |
| 103 | Lucknow City Central | None | Mahabir Prasad Srivastava | INC | 34670 | Raj Kumar | BJS | 19200 |
| 104 | Lucknow City West | None | Syed Ali Zaheer | INC | 22327 | Shri Shanker | BJS | 21207 |
| 105 | Lucknow Cantonment | None | Balak Ram Vaish | INC | 15468 | Chhote Lal Yadav | BJS | 10546 |
| 106 | Nigohan | None | Vijai Kumar | INC | 22171 | Ram Sharan Yadav | PSP | 7003 |
| 107 | Mohanlalganj | SC | Ram Shanker Ravivasi | INC | 8913 | Khyali Ram | PSP | 8888 |
| By Poll 1964 | Mohanlalganj | None | Khyali Ram | PSP | 10759 | Prabhoo Dayal | BJS | 9442 |
| 108 | Bachhrawan | SC | Bhagwan Din (Village Jamurwan) | SOC | 20681 | Rameshwar Prasad | INC | 9217 |
| 109 | Inhauna | None | Pashupatinath Saran Singh | IND | 25978 | Ram Naresh Singh | INC | 4493 |
| 110 | Rae Bareli North | None | Krishna Pal Singh (Raja Sudauli) | BJS | 19675 | Ram Shanker | INC | 17782 |
| 111 | Sareni | None | Gudptar Singh | INC | 16331 | Jai Karan Singh | BJS | 8865 |
| 112 | Dalmau | None | Mahavir Prasad | INC | 18980 | Shambhoo | SOC | 18390 |
| 113 | Rae Bareli South | None | Rati Pal | SOC | 10044 | Rajendra Pratap Singh | INC | 9592 |
| 114 | Rokha | None | Narendra Bahadur Singh | BJS | 19366 | Wasi Naqvi | INC | 17746 |
| 115 | Salon | SC | Pitai | SOC | 21014 | Ram Prasad | INC | 16428 |
| 116 | Kunda | None | Niaz Hasan Khan | INC | 13852 | Har Pal | SOC | 13208 |
| 117 | Dhingwas | SC | Ram Swaroop | INC | 16412 | Gaya Prasad | SOC | 10088 |
| 118 | Pratapgarh South | None | Babu Lal | BJS | 20899 | Bhagwati Prasad | INC | 13118 |
| 119 | Birapur | None | Shyam Sunder | INC | 16833 | Ram Adhar | BJS | 7562 |
| 120 | Patti | SC | Ram Kinkar | INC | 17414 | Mahadeo Prasad | BJS | 16011 |
| 121 | Konhdaur | None | Onkar Nath | BJS | 20223 | Ram Naresh Shukla | INC | 16094 |
| 122 | Pratapgarh North | None | Balendra Bhusan Pratap Singh | BJS | 22963 | Harkesh Bahadur | INC | 10430 |
| 123 | Atheha | None | Kunwar Tej Bhan Singh | SOC | 16255 | Amola Devi | INC | 11363 |
| 124 | Amethi | None | Vaidya Baij Nath Singh | INC | 19391 | Ram Bali | IND | 6966 |
| 125 | Gaura Jamo | None | Kunwar Rudra Pratap Singh | IND | 16764 | Prabhawati | INC | 8221 |
| 126 | Jagdishpur | SC | Indra Pal | INC | 6736 | Ram Sewak | SWA | 3220 |
| 127 | Issauli | None | Ram Bali | INC | 17387 | Gaya Bux | BJS | 6493 |
| 128 | Baraunsa | None | Rama Kant Singh | INC | 11808 | Shri Krishna Singh | BJS | 5416 |
| 129 | Sultanpur | None | Abdul Sami | INC | 12588 | Ram Pyare Shukla | BJS | 12046 |
| 130 | Lambhua | None | Uma Dutta | INC | 15667 | Ugra Sen Singh | BJS | 6659 |
| 131 | Kadipur | None | Shripat Misra | INC | 17747 | Udai Pratap | BJS | 12784 |
| 132 | Aldemau | SC | Shanker Lal | INC | 11637 | Balihari | BJS | 6620 |
| 133 | Minjhaura | None | Mahadeo | IND | 17688 | Maulvi Mohammad Nasir | INC | 12149 |
| 134 | Akbarpur | SC | Ram Rati | INC | 10565 | Paltoo | CPI | 10324 |
| 135 | Surhurpur | None | Jagdamba Prasad | IND | 11959 | Bhagwati Prasad | PSP | 11712 |
| 136 | Birhar | SC | Sukhramdas | INC | 9093 | Badalram | SOC | 7506 |
| 137 | Tanda | None | Jai Ram Varma | INC | 27779 | Satya Narain | IND | 17798 |
| 138 | Amsin | None | Raja Ram | INC | 15125 | Shambhoo Narain Singh | CPI | 11992 |
| 139 | Faizabad | None | Madan Mohan | INC | 19569 | Gur Datt Singh | BJS | 12634 |
| 140 | Bikapur | None | Akhand Pratap Singh | INC | 22058 | Awadhesh Pratap Singh | IND | 17081 |
| 141 | Pachhimrath | None | Hari Nath Tewari | BJS | 11394 | Ram Lal | INC | 10032 |
| 142 | Mangalsi | SC | Dhoom Prasad | BJS | 15628 | Chirkut | INC | 9791 |
| 143 | Rudauli | None | Mukut Behari Lal | BJS | 21689 | Ali Mohammad Zaidi | INC | 21197 |
| 144 | Haidergarh | None | Ram Kishore | IND | 14042 | Jang Bahadur | SOC | 11780 |
| 145 | Siddhaur | SC | Ghan Shyam Dass | INC | 8688 | Nanhe | SOC | 7934 |
| 146 | Dariyabad | None | Duijendra Narain | BJS | 22509 | Bindumati Devi | INC | 15747 |
| 147 | Satrikh | SC | Mendi Lal | SOC | 13651 | Mangal Prasad | INC | 13060 |
| 148 | Nawabganj | None | Jamilur Rahman | INC | 21274 | Anant Ram | SOC | 15397 |
| 149 | Kursi | SC | Nattha Ram | SOC | 20534 | Babulal Kushmesh | INC | 16841 |
| 150 | Bhitauli | None | Ram Asrey | SOC | 19102 | Amar Krishna Narain Singh Raja Ram Nagar | IND | 13952 |
| 151 | Kaisarganj | None | Hukam Singh Visen | INC | 18451 | Jagannath Singh | PSP | 16094 |
| 152 | Fakharpur | None | Abdul Haseeb Khan | SWA | 13003 | Kirpa Ram | INC | 7551 |
| 153 | Mahsi | SC | Ram Adhar Kannaujia | SWA | 17032 | Raj Kishore Rao | INC | 8080 |
| 154 | Nanpara | None | Basant Lal Sharma | INC | 10905 | Kishun Lal | IND | 10564 |
| 155 | Charda | None | Prem Singh | SWA | 16006 | Hamidulla Khan | INC | 7126 |
| 156 | Bahraich North | None | Jadish Prasad | INC | 28162 | Syed Zargham Haider | PSP | 24830 |
| 157 | Bahraich South | None | Daljit Singh | INC | 16723 | Badlu Ram | PSP | 16188 |
| 158 | Ikauna | SC | Mangol | SWA | 12362 | Mahadeo Prasad | INC | 9754 |
| 159 | Bhinga | None | Mannu Singh | SWA | 15387 | Shiva Saran Lal | INC | 8718 |
| 160 | Tulsipur | None | Bdaldeo Singh | BJS | 28482 | Balbhadra Prasad | INC | 22694 |
| 161 | Balrampur North | SC | Sukhdeo Prasad | BJS | 18217 | Shyam Lal | INC | 16200 |
| 162 | Balrampur South | None | Babban Singh | INC | 20439 | Pratap Narain | BJS | 20384 |
| 163 | Utraula | None | Suraj Lal | BJS | 24704 | Ali Jarrar Jaffery | INC | 20205 |
| 164 | Sadullanagar | None | Avadh Narain Singh | BJS | 13217 | Raghurantej Bahadur Singh | SWA | 12962 |
| 165 | Mankapur | None | Raghvendra Pratap Singh | SWA | 29849 | Devendra Nath Misra | INC | 21918 |
| By Poll 1964 | Mankapur | None | K.A.Singh | INC | 34366 | Devandra Nath | BJS | 5960 |
| 166 | Gonda East | None | Ishwar Saran | INC | 12893 | Ragho Ram Pandey | SWA | 12207 |
| 167 | Gonda North | None | Navrang Singh | SWA | 10126 | Ram Dulare | BJS | 9771 |
| 168 | Gonda West | SC | Ganga Prasad | INC | 11462 | Captain Ram Gharib | SWA | 9034 |
| 169 | Paharapur | None | Santi Chand | INC | 11982 | Kedar Nath | SWA | 11068 |
| 170 | Sarju | None | Girja Prasad | SOC | 8910 | Piarey Lal | BJS | 8802 |
| 171 | Tarabganj | None | Sital Prasad | INC | 10578 | Raghuraj | SWA | 7655 |
| 172 | Mahadeva | None | Vishnu Pratap Singh | INC | 17039 | Baldeo Singh | SWA | 13245 |
| 173 | Harraiya West | None | Ran Bahadur Singh | INC | 11802 | Surendra Pratap Narain | SWA | 9063 |
| 174 | Harraiya East | None | Ram Lakhan Singh | INC | 12604 | Bhagwan Singh | PSP | 11340 |
| 175 | Nagar | None | Shakuntala Nayar | BJS | 17352 | Ram Shanker Lal | INC | 15421 |
| 176 | Basti | None | Rajendra Kishori | INC | 18483 | Nirmal Kumari | BJS | 12134 |
| 177 | Domariaganj South | None | Kazi Jalil Abbasi | INC | 19252 | Jaidatt Singh | SWA | 11860 |
| 178 | Domariaganj North | None | Bhanu Pratap Singh | SWA | 23769 | Mahadeo Singh | INC | 14962 |
| 179 | Bansi West | None | Ram Kumar | INC | 15909 | Sheo Narain | BJS | 11550 |
| 180 | Banganga West | None | Madho Prasad Tripathi | BJS | 22879 | Prabhu Dayal | INC | 15806 |
| 181 | Banganga East | None | Chandra Pal | BJS | 15570 | Mohammad Suleman | INC | 9736 |
| 182 | Naugarh | None | Jagdish | BJS | 18822 | Mathura Prasad | INC | 15818 |
| 183 | Bansi North | None | Tameshwar Prasad | INC | 15173 | Rama Kant | BJS | 14656 |
| By Poll 1965 | Bansi North | None | K.K.K.Nayar | BJS | 23876 | D.Shanker | INC | 17384 |
| 184 | Bansi South | SC | Sohan Lal Dhusia | INC | 15922 | Shankar Dass | SWA | 4146 |
| 185 | Menhdawal | None | Sucheta Kripalani | INC | 24424 | Chandrashekhar Singh | BJS | 20476 |
| 186 | Khalilabad | SC | Genda Devi | INC | 16584 | Bhawani Saran | SWA | 9368 |
| 187 | Mahuli West | SC | Shyam Lal | SWA | 19389 | Ram Lal | INC | 18220 |
| 188 | Mahuli East | None | Kashi Nath Bahadur | SWA | 24814 | Dhanushdhari | INC | 12767 |
| 189 | Bansgaon | None | Ganesh Prasad | INC | 11101 | Dasharath | PSP | 5153 |
| 190 | Dhuriapar | SC | Yasoda Devi | INC | 11588 | Rampati | SOC | 3252 |
| 191 | Chillupar | None | Kalpanath Singh | PSP | 14267 | Kailashwati | INC | 13907 |
| 192 | Bhawapar | None | Ram Lakhan Shukla | INC | 15809 | Ashwani Kumar | SOC | 8176 |
| 193 | Jhangha | SC | Ram Surat | INC | 12814 | Rampati | SOC | 11140 |
| 194 | Pipraich | None | Achhaiber Singh | INC | 10356 | Madhukar Dighe | SOC | 10160 |
| 195 | Gorakhpur | None | Niamatullah Ansari | INC | 22441 | Lakshmi Kant Chaturvedi | BJS | 18347 |
| 196 | Maniram | None | Avadyanath | HMS | 29001 | Keshav Pande | INC | 17664 |
| 197 | Maghar | None | Keshbhan | INC | 14501 | Ramkaran | PSP | 7814 |
| 198 | Pharenda West | None | Narsingh Narain | SOC | 15724 | Gauri Ram | INC | 13442 |
| 199 | Pharenda East | None | Dwarka Prasad Pande | INC | 10638 | Ramanuj | SOC | 7847 |
| 200 | Shyam Deurwa | None | Ashtbhuja | INC | 9056 | Bakhshish Ali | IND | 7285 |
| By Poll 1964 | Shyam Deurwa | None | S.L.Sexena | IND | 19944 | Bakshish Ali | PSP | 6788 |
| 201 | Maharajganj | SC | Duryodhan | SOC | 16797 | Sukhdeo | INC | 10215 |
| 202 | Binaikpur | None | Ram Avadh | INC | 15140 | Abdul Rauf Lari | SOC | 14377 |
| 203 | Tilpur | None | Yadvendra Singh Urf Lallan Ji | INC | 26743 | Madan Pandey | SOC | 16312 |
| 204 | Sidhuwa Jobna | SC | Sheo Prasad | INC | 20426 | Shri Narain | BJS | 11876 |
| By Poll 1964 | Sidhuwa Jobna | SC | Dasarath Kprasad | INC | 17697 | Srinarain | BJS | 13686 |
| 205 | Ramkola | None | Rajdeo | INC | 17343 | Mangal | BJS | 12222 |
| 206 | Hata | None | Bankelal | PSP | 15963 | Ram Sumer | INC | 12146 |
| 207 | Padrauna West | None | Mangal | INC | 16744 | Ramdhari | PSP | 12195 |
| 208 | Padrauna North | None | Chanderdeo | INC | 16344 | Banarsi | BJS | 10114 |
| 209 | Padrauna East | None | Genda Singh | PSP | 17793 | Raj Mangal | INC | 16664 |
| 210 | Padrauna South | None | Ramayan | PSP | 18060 | Mohammad Farooq Chishti | INC | 11449 |
| 211 | Deoria North | None | Ram Lal | INC | 18056 | Rama Shankar | BJS | 11890 |
| 212 | Deoria South | None | Kisuna | SOC | 15389 | Deep Narain Mani | INC | 15248 |
| 213 | Gauri Bazar | SC | Sita Ram | INC | 24624 | Basant | SOC | 16587 |
| 214 | Rudrapur | None | Chandrabali | SOC | 19286 | Ramji Sahai | INC | 10865 |
| 215 | Salempur West | None | Ugrasen | SOC | 11741 | Sheobachan Rao | INC | 11528 |
| 216 | Salempur East | None | Kailas | PSP | 12445 | Ayodhya Prasad Arya | INC | 11332 |
| 217 | Salempur South | None | Raja Awadhesh Pratap | PSP | 19572 | Rajbanshi | INC | 16332 |
| 218 | Nathupur | None | Ram Sunder | PSP | 12461 | Shyam Sunder | INC | 11460 |
| 219 | Ghosi | None | Jharkhande Rai | CPI | 22575 | Rameshwar Prasad | INC | 16972 |
| 220 | Sagri | None | Indrasan | INC | 10246 | Narbadeshwar | CPI | 9243 |
| 221 | Gopalpur | None | Uma Shanker | PSP | 13437 | Mukti Nath | INC | 10575 |
| 222 | Atraulia | None | Brij Behari | INC | 15638 | Sabhajeet | BJS | 8477 |
| 223 | Nizamabad | None | Amjad Ali | INC | 11907 | Jitendra Nath Misra | PSP | 11858 |
| 224 | Azamgarh | None | Bhima Prasad | PSP | 21885 | Brahmchari Chandra Bali | INC | 14956 |
| 225 | Saraimir | SC | Mangaldeo | PSP | 12430 | Murlidhar | INC | 10453 |
| 226 | Mahul | None | Daulat Lal | PSP | 18435 | Ram Bachan | INC | 12328 |
| 227 | Deogaon | None | Satyadeo | PSP | 12505 | Triveni | INC | 12497 |
| 228 | Bela Daultabad | SC | Chhangur | CPI | 8967 | Jainoo | PSP | 8065 |
| 229 | Mubarakpur | SC | Surjan | CPI | 12871 | Vishwanath | INC | 9142 |
| 230 | Mohammadabad Gohna | None | Chandrajit | CPI | 15278 | Umrao | INC | 10145 |
| 231 | Kopaganj | None | Z. A. Ahmad | CPI | 14993 | Brij Mohan Das Agrawal | BJS | 14560 |
| 232 | Rasra | SC | Raghunath | CPI | 18696 | Ram Ratan | INC | 16197 |
| 233 | Siar | None | Ganga Prasad Singh | INC | 11857 | Ram Agya | SOC | 11252 |
| 234 | Sikanderpur | None | Jagarnath | INC | 23981 | Baijnath | CPI | 11217 |
| 235 | Bansdih West | None | Sheo Mangal | INC | 25549 | Raja Ram | IND | 18418 |
| 236 | Bansdih East | None | Kashi Nath | SOC | 18601 | Braj Behari Singh | INC | 14080 |
| 237 | Duab | None | Manager | PSP | 21994 | Ram Nath Pathak | INC | 12046 |
| 238 | Ballia | None | Ram Anat Pandeya | INC | 17094 | Gauri Shankar | PSP | 16299 |
| 239 | Kopachit | None | Mandhata Singh | INC | 16207 | Kamta | CPI | 11804 |
| 240 | Zahoorabad | SC | Raghubir | CPI | 23669 | Palku | INC | 15626 |
| 241 | Mohammadabad | None | Vijay Shankar Singh | INC | 19182 | Vijay Narain | CPI | 11769 |
| 242 | Zamania | None | Vashishta Narain Sharma | INC | 18936 | Mahendra Prasad Rai | IND | 12020 |
| 243 | Ghazipur | None | Krishna Nand Rai | INC | 16599 | Sushila Devi | IND | 10601 |
| 244 | Karanda | None | Ram Sunder Shashtri | CPI | 10402 | Awadhesh | PSP | 6252 |
| 245 | Pachotar | SC | Jhilmit Jhilloo | CPI | 13561 | Dev Ram | INC | 11659 |
| 246 | Shadiabad | None | Raj Nath | INC | 10111 | Raj Narain Singh | CPI | 8621 |
| 247 | Saidpur | None | Kamla Singh Yadav | PSP | 10238 | Atma Ram Pande | INC | 9651 |
| 248 | Kerakat | SC | Ram Samjhawan | INC | 20884 | Ram Sagar | BJS | 19476 |
| 249 | Beyalsi | None | Lal Bahadur | INC | 23249 | Daya Shanker | BJS | 19988 |
| 250 | Jaunpur | None | Yadvendra Dutt | BJS | 34038 | Har-Govind Singh | INC | 28763 |
| 251 | Rari | None | Kunwar Sripal | BJS | 17337 | Ram Lakhan Singh | INC | 16897 |
| 252 | Shahganj | None | Lakshami Shanker | INC | 32260 | Thakur Prasad | IND | 17266 |
| 253 | Chanda | SC | Mata Prasad | INC | 20008 | Raghunath | BJS | 10230 |
| 254 | Garwara | None | Bhagwati Din | INC | 16010 | Ram Lakhan | CPI | 12954 |
| 255 | Machhlishahr | None | Kesari Prasad | PSP | 23475 | Mohd. Rauf Jafri | INC | 19463 |
| 256 | Mariahu | None | Jagarnath | BJS | 21735 | Tara Devi | INC | 19649 |
| 257 | Barsathi | None | Ramesh Chandra Sharma | INC | 14539 | Ram Murti | CPI | 13421 |
| 258 | Bhadohi | None | Banshidhar Pandey | INC | 16190 | Ramdeo Prasad Ambash | BJS | 10570 |
| 259 | Gyanpur | SC | Harigain Ram | INC | 14895 | Kashi Prasad | BJS | 12918 |
| 260 | Kaswar | None | Gaya Prasad | SOC | 17295 | Bechan Ram Gupta | INC | 16569 |
| 261 | Kolasla | None | Udal | CPI | 21580 | Raj Bihari Singh | INC | 17701 |
| 262 | Gangapur | None | Rishi Narain Shashtri | INC | 23726 | Raj Narain | SOC | 23204 |
| 263 | Varanasi City South | None | Girdhari Lal | INC | 20244 | Satin Rustam | CPI | 16150 |
| 264 | Varanasi City North | None | Vishwanath Prasad | BJS | 22388 | M. Abdus Samad | INC | 21235 |
| 265 | Sheopur | None | Lal Bahadur Singh | INC | 16507 | Jawahar Lal | CPI | 13988 |
| By Poll 1959 | Sheopur | None | L. Bahadur | INC | 13415 | Baldeo | SOC | 8859 |
| 266 | Katehari | None | Raghunath Singh | SOC | 18113 | Himmat Bahadur | INC | 15063 |
| 267 | Mahaich | None | Raj Narain | INC | 15132 | Sada Nand | SOC | 13367 |
| 268 | Moghal Sarai | None | Uma Shanker | SOC | 17117 | Shyam Lal Yadav | INC | 15230 |
| 269 | Chandauli | None | Kamlapati Tripathi | INC | 23568 | Nihal Singh | SOC | 13234 |
| 270 | Chakia | SC | Ram Lakhan | INC | 16232 | Narendra Kumar Shastri | SOC | 14210 |
| 271 | Dudhi | SC | Ram Pyare | INC | 14678 | Ayodhya Prasad | BJS | 7893 |
| 272 | Robertsganj | None | Ram Nath Pathak | INC | 14700 | Indraj Bahadur Singh Alias Shahzada | IND | 14510 |
| 273 | Ahraura | None | Vishwanath | INC | 17508 | Shiva Dutt | BJS | 17362 |
| 274 | Chunar | None | Raj Narain | INC | 18799 | Shivanath | BJS | 13054 |
| 275 | Mirzapur | None | Bhagwan Das | BJS | 21622 | Amresh Chand | INC | 21321 |
| 276 | Kantit North | None | Aziz Imam | INC | 20227 | Swami Brahmashram | BJS | 15993 |
| 277 | Kantit South | SC | Bechan Ram | INC | 12418 | Ram Nihore Rai | BJS | 5391 |
| 278 | Meja | None | Salig Ram Jaiswal | PSP | 31784 | Mangla Prasad | INC | 21951 |
| 279 | Bara | SC | Raghunath Prasad | INC | 12172 | Sheo Prasad | PSP | 10659 |
| 280 | Karchana | None | Satya Narain Pande | PSP | 15075 | Shitla Din Dwivedi | INC | 14379 |
| 281 | Kewai | None | Vaij Nath Pande | INC | 22386 | Roop Nath Singh | SOC | 7411 |
| 282 | Jhusi | SC | Banshi Lal | PSP | 15553 | Sukhi Ram Bhartiya | INC | 14283 |
| 283 | Phulpur | None | Muzaffar Hasan | INC | 21560 | Amar Singh | BJS | 7232 |
| 284 | Soraon East | None | Sheo Murti | INC | 20441 | Shankar Lal | PSP | 6037 |
| 285 | Saraon West | None | Mewa Lal | PSP | 13503 | Parmanand Sinha | INC | 12673 |
| 286 | Allahabad City North | None | Rajendra Kumari Bajpayee | INC | 24486 | Radhey Shyam Pathak | PSP | 11282 |
| 287 | Allahabad City South | None | Kalyan Chand Mohiley Alias Chhunnan Guru | PSP | 20491 | Baijnath Kapoor | INC | 18600 |
| 288 | Chail | None | Naunihal Singh Chaudhari | PSP | 17508 | Kamal Kuamri Goindi | INC | 12922 |
| 289 | Bharwari | SC | Gokul Prasad | IND | 14504 | Kalyan Chand | INC | 10168 |
| 290 | Karari | SC | Nathu Ram | BJS | 8796 | Dr. Jawahar Lal | INC | 8632 |
| 291 | Sirathu | None | Hemwati Nandan Bahuguna | INC | 11771 | Jagat Narain | IND | 6892 |
| 292 | Khaga | None | Raksha Pal Singh | BJS | 12913 | Chandra Kishore | REP | 11697 |
| 293 | Fatehpur | SC | Badri Prasad | INC | 11016 | Maiku Lal S/O Jodha Lal | IND | 9336 |
| 294 | Bindki | None | Jagannath Singh | INC | 9800 | Panna Lal Alias Panna Bhaiya | IND | 9569 |
| 295 | Tappajar | None | Ram Kishore | IND | 10292 | Shabbir Hasan | INC | 9882 |
| 296 | Haswa | SC | Raghubir Sahai | IND | 12369 | Jageshwar | INC | 11047 |
| 297 | Kishunpur | None | Deep Narian Singh | IND | 18891 | Ram Pal Tiwari | INC | 15451 |
| 298 | Manikpur | SC | Sia Dulari | INC | 7582 | Ramapati Prakash Jatav | PSP | 2254 |
| 299 | Karwi | None | Din Dayal | INC | 5574 | Ram Autar | CPI | 3624 |
| 300 | Baberu | None | Deshraj | IND | 11049 | Bhagwat | CPI | 7249 |
| 301 | Naraini | None | Matola Singh | BJS | 9350 | Jag Prasad | PSP | 4281 |
| 302 | Banda | None | Brij Mohan Lal Gupta | INC | 9173 | Shanker Lal | IND | 8903 |
| 303 | Mahoba | None | Madanpal Singh | PSP | 14807 | Brijgopal | INC | 13239 |
| 304 | Maudaha | None | Brijraj Singh | INC | 24095 | Mannilal | PSP | 15042 |
| 305 | Hamirpur | None | Surendra Dutta Bajpai | INC | 21126 | Yadunath Singh | PSP | 16439 |
| 306 | Rath | None | Doongar Singh | INC | 26870 | Sripat Sahai | PSP | 18075 |
| 307 | Charkhari | SC | Mohan Lal Ahirwar | INC | 15078 | Chhannu Lal | PSP | 10606 |
| 308 | Mehroni | None | Krishna Chandra | INC | 17380 | Raghunath Singh | BJS | 15011 |
| 309 | Lalitpur | SC | Ayodhya Prasad | INC | 13047 | Mardan | CPI | 6235 |
| 310 | Jhansi | None | Lakhpat Ram Sharma | IND | 21049 | Atma Ram Govind Kher | INC | 17504 |
| 311 | Moth | None | Sudama Prasad Goswami | INC | 20036 | Chandan Singh | CPI | 15195 |
| 312 | Mau | SC | Beni Bai | INC | 17691 | Halke Ram | PSP | 9410 |
| 313 | Garautha | None | Kashi Prasad Dwedi | INC | 16905 | Kanhaiya Lal | PSP | 14378 |
| 314 | Konch | None | Vijai Singh | SWA | 8750 | Ganesh Prasad | PSP | 8193 |
| 315 | Jalaun | None | Chaturbhuj Sharma | INC | 30289 | Govind Narain Tiwari | PSP | 22170 |
| 316 | Umri | SC | Basant Lal | INC | 19712 | Garib Das Choudhari | SWA | 5961 |
| 317 | Kalpi | None | Shiva Sampati Sharma | INC | 17450 | Manni Lal Agarwal | PSP | 14025 |
| 318 | Bhognipur | None | Raj Narain Misra | INC | 20759 | Ram Swarup Verma | SOC | 16927 |
| 319 | Ghatampur West | SC | Jwala Prasad | INC | 14125 | Keshari Lal | SOC | 6069 |
| 320 | Ghatampur East | None | Sheo Nath Singh | SOC | 20511 | Beni Singh | INC | 18763 |
| 321 | Kanpur City I | None | Tara Agarwal | INC | 23994 | Shakuntla Srivastava | PSP | 10128 |
| 322 | Kanpur City I I | None | Sant Singh Yusuf | CPI | 23119 | Brahma Dutt Dikshit | INC | 21749 |
| 323 | Kanpur City I I I | None | Hamid Khan | INC | 15663 | Babu Badrey | PSP | 9714 |
| 324 | Kanpur City I V | None | S. G. Datta | INC | 17768 | Ravi Sinha | CPI | 10083 |
| 325 | Kanpur City V | None | Sushila Rohatgi | INC | 21440 | Manohar Lal | IND | 12649 |
| 326 | Kanpur Rural | None | Shashi Bhushan Singh | PSP | 16502 | Jamuna Narain Shukla | INC | 16193 |
| 327 | Bithoor | None | Brij Rani | INC | 11528 | Ram Kumar | IND | 10338 |
| 328 | Bilhaur | SC | Murlidhar Kureel | INC | 11149 | Moti Lal Dahelvi | SOC | 9666 |
| 329 | Akbarpur | None | Balwan Singh | PSP | 17305 | Dwijendra Nath | SWA | 10183 |
| 330 | Derapur | None | Nitya Nand Pandey | INC | 16636 | Ram Pal Singh | SOC | 11376 |
| 331 | Auraiya | None | Badri Prasad | INC | 13424 | Bharat Singh Chauhan | PSP | 9773 |
| 332 | Ajitmal | SC | Sukh Lal | INC | 12106 | Sukhbasi Lal | SOC | 2963 |
| 333 | Lakhana | SC | Ghasi Ram | INC | 13384 | Rangilal | SOC | 8842 |
| 334 | Etawah | None | Hoti Lal Agarwal | INC | 19024 | Bhuwanesh Bhushan | BJS | 16007 |
| 335 | Jaswantnagar | None | Natthu Singh | PSP | 12045 | Bishambhar Singh | INC | 11306 |
| 336 | Bharthana | None | Sahdeo Singh | PSP | 21365 | Raghuber Dayal | SOC | 11852 |
| 337 | Bidhuna | None | Vijai Shanker | INC | 13881 | Ramadhar | SOC | 11703 |
| 338 | Saurikh | None | Hori Lal Yadav | PSP | 15527 | Nand Ram | INC | 15124 |
| 339 | Kannauj | SC | Pati Ram | INC | 20394 | Sita Ram | PSP | 8183 |
| 340 | Chhibramau | None | Kotwal Singh Bhadauria | PSP | 17781 | Ram Sewak | INC | 15145 |
| 341 | Bhojpur | None | Mahram Singh | INC | 10871 | Sunder Lal | CPI | 6543 |
| 342 | Farrukhabad | None | Daya Ram | BJS | 13548 | Brijnandan Lal | INC | 11023 |
| 343 | Shamsabad | None | Rajendra Singh Yadav | PSP | 25954 | Avadhesh Chandra Singh | INC | 20813 |
| 344 | Kaimganj | None | Sia Ram | PSP | 18637 | Girish Chandra | BJS | 15044 |
| 345 | Bhongaon | None | Subedar Singh | INC | 12297 | Jagdish Narain Tripathi | CPI | 11294 |
| 346 | Kishni | None | Ganesh Chand | INC | 11363 | Chiroji Lal | REP | 6551 |
| 347 | Karhal | SC | Ram Singh | SWA | 8789 | Munshi Lal | REP | 7608 |
| 348 | Mainpuri | None | Brijeshwar Sahai | INC | 12753 | Raghubir Singh | PSP | 12475 |
| 349 | Ghiror | None | Madho Narain | INC | 14035 | Virendra Pati Yadav | IND | 13522 |
| 350 | Shikohabad | None | Mansa Ram | IND | 19344 | Ram Swarup Yadav | INC | 18687 |
| 351 | Jasrana | None | Balbir Singh | SWA | 14272 | Ram Chandra Singh | IND | 10674 |
| 352 | Etah | None | Ganga Prasad | HMS | 18878 | Sahdeo Singh | INC | 9032 |
| 353 | Sirhpura | None | Chhotey Lal Paliwal | INC | 7889 | Ram Singh | HMS | 7808 |
| 354 | Aliganj | None | Lokpal Singh | BJS | 13006 | Roop Narain | INC | 9700 |
| 355 | Nidhpur | None | Rajendra Singh | BJS | 12668 | Mohammad Ishaq Khan | INC | 9975 |
| 356 | Sahawar | None | Bed Ram | BJS | 14627 | Soharan Singh | PSP | 9739 |
| 357 | Kasganj | None | Girwar Prasad | BJS | 13795 | Kali Charan | INC | 9163 |
| 358 | Marhara | None | Raghubir Singh | PSP | 10744 | Virendra Singh | BJS | 8811 |
| 359 | Jalesar | SC | Chiranji Lal | SWA | 22313 | Khazanchi Lal | INC | 11185 |
| 360 | Etmadpur South | None | Multan Singh | SOC | 10410 | Ram Khilari Verma | REP | 9234 |
| 361 | Etmadpur North | SC | Sheo Charan | SOC | 13292 | Ram Chandra Sehra | INC | 8301 |
| 362 | Firozabad | None | Bhagwan Das | REP | 12086 | Jagdish Prasad Upadhyaya | BJS | 11547 |
| 363 | Bah | None | Vidyawati | INC | 14554 | Ram Sahai | REP | 10425 |
| 364 | Fatehabad | None | Banwari Lal Pipra | REP | 10986 | Hukam Singh | PSP | 10939 |
| 365 | Kheragarh | None | Jagan Prasad | INC | 22208 | Tej Singh | SWA | 13288 |
| 366 | Agra City I | None | Baloji Agrawal | IND | 20032 | Prakash Narain Gupta | REP | 14562 |
| 367 | Agra City I I | None | Khem Chand | REP | 17003 | Deoki Nandan Vibhav | INC | 15839 |
| 368 | Agra Rural | SC | Chatra Pati Ambesh | INC | 21912 | Karan Singh Kane | REP | 20865 |
| 369 | Fatehpur Sikri | None | Champa Wati | INC | 17393 | Kunwar Sen | REP | 11053 |
| 370 | Mathura | None | Kedar Nath | INC | 21700 | Devi Charan | BJS | 18746 |
| 371 | Goverdhan | None | Acharya Jugal Kishore | INC | 17621 | Wazir Chand | BJS | 11973 |
| 372 | Chhata | None | Lakhi Singh | SOC | 18343 | Teekam Singh | BJS | 10828 |
| 373 | Mat | None | Radhey Shyam | SOC | 16669 | Lakshmi Raman Acharya | INC | 15079 |
| 374 | Gokul | SC | Kanhaiya Lal | INC | 13392 | Raja Ram | BJS | 5963 |
| 375 | Sadabad | None | Ashraf Ali Khan | INC | 17934 | Chandra Pal | IND | 9015 |
| 376 | Hathras | None | Nand Kumar Deo Vashistha | INC | 11374 | Gajadhar Singh | CPI | 7105 |
| 377 | Sasni | SC | Ram Prasad Deshmukh | INC | 13351 | Mewa Ram | REP | 10564 |
| 378 | Sikandra Rao | None | Nek Ram Sharma | IND | 31470 | Nem Singh Chauhan | BJS | 18424 |
| 379 | Gangiri | None | Sri Niwas | INC | 18323 | Anisul Rehman Sherwani | SOC | 11194 |
| 380 | Atrauli | None | Babu Singh | SOC | 20999 | Kalyan Singh | BJS | 13439 |
| 381 | Aligarh | None | Abdul Basir Khan | REP | 21909 | Anant Ram Verma | INC | 16164 |
| 382 | Koil | SC | Bhoop Singh | REP | 12918 | Ram Singh | BJS | 11469 |
| 383 | Iglas | None | Sheodan Singh | IND | 9770 | Soran Lal Sharma | BJS | 7693 |
| 384 | Khair | None | Chetanya Raj Singh | SWA | 22076 | Mohan Lal Gautam | INC | 14766 |
| 385 | Tappal | None | Mahendra Singh | IND | 13428 | Mahavir Singh | PSP | 11032 |
| 386 | Jewar | SC | Jasram Singh | INC | 13014 | Hari Singh Balmiki | PSP | 9895 |
| 387 | Khurja | None | Mahabir Singh | INC | 8972 | Mahmood Hasan | PSP | 8575 |
| 388 | Chhatari | SC | Dharam Singh | INC | 20703 | Trilok Chand | PSP | 14150 |
| 389 | Debai | None | Himmat Singh | BJS | 14479 | Bhim Sen Lodhi | REP | 12512 |
| 390 | Anupshahr | None | Chunni Lal | INC | 17356 | Mangal Singh | BJS | 10383 |
| 391 | Siana | None | Mumtaz Mhd. Khan | PSP | 27019 | Mithan Lal | INC | 23655 |
| 392 | Agota | None | Jagbir Singh | INC | 21067 | Shafqatullah | REP | 14231 |
| 393 | Bulandshahr | None | Irrtiza Husain | INC | 17127 | Madhav Beni Prasad | PSP | 14595 |
| 394 | Sikandrabad | None | Bansari Dass | INC | 25480 | Hoshiar Singh | PSP | 19108 |
| 395 | Dadri | None | Ramchandar Vikal | INC | 24148 | Amar Singh | PSP | 11761 |
| 396 | Ghaziabad | None | Tej Singh | INC | 17610 | Ishwar Dayal | BJS | 15609 |
| 397 | Modinagar | None | Vichitra Narain Sharma | INC | 24673 | Hukam Singh | PSP | 15845 |
| 398 | Dasna | None | Meghnath Singh Shishodia | IND | 24420 | Mahmood Ali Khan | INC | 18342 |
| 399 | Hapur | None | Prem Sunder | IND | 21407 | Kailash Prakash | INC | 20958 |
| 400 | Garhmukteshwar | SC | Vir Sen | INC | 12801 | Guru Dayal | PSP | 9642 |
| 401 | Kithore | None | Shraddha Devi | INC | 21647 | Oma Datt | IND | 14342 |
| 402 | Hastinapur | None | Pitam Singh Of Pirnagar | INC | 25438 | Ved Prakash | BJS | 10247 |
| 403 | Meerut City | None | Jagdish Saran Rastogi | INC | 18026 | Mohan Lal Kapoor | BJS | 14683 |
| 404 | Meerut Cantonment | None | Prakashwati Sood | INC | 18942 | Shanti Swaroop | CPI | 9340 |
| 405 | Meerut Rural | SC | Hari Singh | INC | 21788 | Khazan Singh | SOC | 14549 |
| 406 | Baghpat | None | Shaukat Hameed Khan | INC | 19672 | Bharat Singh | CPI | 17110 |
| 407 | Kotana | None | Charan Singh | INC | 33912 | Shyam Lal | IND | 7271 |
| 408 | Baraut | None | Mool Chand Shastri | INC | 18112 | Acharya Deepankar | IND | 17567 |
| 409 | Barnawa | None | Jamadar Singh | IND | 19912 | Rana Fateh Singh | INC | 13027 |
| 410 | Sardhana | SC | Ramji Lal Sahayak | INC | 23858 | Rati Ram | REP | 5624 |
| 411 | Budhana | None | Vijai Pal Singh | CPI | 45404 | Mohkam Singh | INC | 18196 |
| 412 | Shikarpur | None | Sugan Chand | INC | 20350 | Ram Singh | BJS | 9732 |
| 413 | Jansath | None | Ahmad Baksh | INC | 15215 | Dhir Singh | CPI | 14833 |
| 414 | Bhokerheri | SC | Shugan Chand Mazdoor | INC | 18019 | Sher Singh | PSP | 6845 |
| 415 | Baghara | SC | Nain Singh | PSP | 14160 | Badam Singh | INC | 11543 |
| 416 | Muzaffarnagar | None | Keshava Gupt | INC | 18557 | Saeed Murtaza | IND | 15576 |
| 417 | Kairana | None | Chandan Singh | IND | 30956 | Virendra Verma | INC | 21623 |
| 418 | Bhawan | None | Ram Chandra Singh | INC | 23908 | Ghayoor Ali Khan | PSP | 17480 |
| 419 | Nakur | None | Yashpal | INC | 22592 | Qazi Masood | IND | 17489 |
| 420 | Sarsawa | SC | Shakuntala Devi | INC | 19224 | Gainda Ram | SWA | 9097 |
| 421 | Muzaffarabad | None | Sardar Singh | IND | 22051 | Mahmood Ali Khan | INC | 16960 |
| 422 | Saharanpur | None | Brahm Dutt Mayor | IND | 17961 | Abdul Khaliq | INC | 15973 |
| 423 | Harora | None | Jai Gopal | INC | 11334 | Molhar Singh | SOC | 10818 |
| 424 | Nagal | SC | Ram Singh | INC | 19548 | Bhagwat | BJS | 7267 |
| 425 | Deoband | None | Phool Singh | INC | 36512 | Mahipal Singh | BJS | 9270 |
| 426 | Jwalapur | None | Sayeed Ahmad | INC | 20217 | Kaviraj Yogendra Pal | BJS | 12836 |
| 427 | Roorkee | None | Jagdish Narain Sinha | INC | 20499 | Kulki Raj | IND | 11083 |
| 428 | Hardwar | None | Shanti Prapan Sharma | INC | 27613 | Asa Ram | IND | 7273 |
| 429 | Dehra Dun | None | Brij Bhushan Saran | INC | 12638 | Ram Swarup | IND | 12356 |
| 430 | Mussoorie | None | Gulab Singh | INC | 21105 | Baru Datt | PSP | 9941 |

== See also ==
- Government of Uttar Pradesh
- List of chief ministers of Uttar Pradesh
- Politics of India
- Sixteenth Legislative Assembly of Uttar Pradesh
- Uttar Pradesh Legislative Assembly
