= Sambhal Lok Sabha constituency =

Lok Sabha Constituency in Uttar Pradesh, India

Coordinates: 28.59°N 78.57°E

Sambhal UP-8
- Lok Sabha constituency
- Interactive Map Outlining Sambhal Lok Sabha constituency

Constituency details
- Country: India
- Region: North India
- State: Uttar Pradesh
- Assembly constituencies: Kundarki; Bilari; Chandausi; Asmoli; Sambhal
- Established: 1967
- Total electors: 18,98,306
- Reservation: None

Member of Parliament
- 18th Lok Sabha
- Incumbent Zia ur Rahman Barq
- Party: Samajwadi Party
- Alliance: INDIA
- Elected year: 2024

Sambhal Lok Sabha constituency (Hindi pronunciation: [sə̃bʱəl]) is one of the 80 Lok Sabha (parliamentary) constituencies in the Indian state of Uttar Pradesh.

== Assembly segments ==
Presently, Sambahal Lok Sabha constituency comprises five Vidhan Sabha (legislative assembly) segments. These are:

No	Name	District	Member	Party	2024 Lead
29	Kundarki	Moradabad	Thakur Ramveer Singh	BJP	SP
30	Bilari	Moradabad	Mohammed Faeem	SP	SP
31	Chandausi (SC)	Sambhal	Gulabo Devi	BJP	BJP
32	Asmoli	Sambhal	Pinki Yadav	SP	SP
33	Sambhal	Sambhal	Iqbal Mehmood	SP	SP

== Members of Parliament ==
Year	Member	Party
1952-1971	Constituency did not exist	
1977	Shanti Devi	Janata Party
1980	Bijendra Pal Singh Yadav	Indian National Congress
1984	Shanti Devi	Indian National Congress
1989	Sripal Singh Yadav	Janata Dal
1991	Sripal Singh Yadav	Janata Dal
1996	D. P. Yadav	Bahujan Samaj Party
1998	Mulayam Singh Yadav	Samajwadi Party
1999	Mulayam Singh Yadav	Samajwadi Party
2004	Ram Gopal Yadav	Samajwadi Party
2009	Shafiqur Rahman Barq	Bahujan Samaj Party
2014	Satyapal Singh Saini	Bharatiya Janata Party
2019	Shafiqur Rahman Barq	Samajwadi Party
2024	Zia ur Rahman Barq	Samajwadi Party

== Election results ==
=== General Election 2024 ===
2024 Indian general election: Sambhal
Party	Candidate	Votes	%	±%
SP	Zia ur Rahman Barq	571,161	47.80	▼7.80
BJP	Parmeshwar Lal Saini	4,49,667	37.63	▼3.20
BSP	Shaulat Ali	1,52,460	12.76	▲12.76
NOTA	None of the Above	7,217	0.60	▼0.01
Majority		1,21,494	10.17	▼4.60
Turnout		11,94,983	62.95	▼1.78
SP hold		Swing		

=== General Election 2019 ===
2019 Indian general elections: Sambhal
Party	Candidate	Votes	%	±%
SP	Shafiqur Rahman Barq	658,006	55.60	+22.01
BJP	Parmeshwar Lal Saini	4,83,180	40.83	+6.03
INC	Major Jagatpal Singh	12,105	1.02	−0.50
NOTA	NOTA	7,230	0.61	−0.11
Other	Other Candidates	22,948	1.98	
Majority		1,74,826	14.77	+14.28
Turnout		11,83,788	64.73	+2.30
SP gain from BJP		Swing		

=== General election 2014 ===
2014 Indian general elections: Sambhal
Party	Candidate	Votes	%	±%
BJP	Satyapal Singh Saini	360,242	34.08	+16.02
SP	Shafiqur Rahman Barq	3,55,068	33.59	+5.15
BSP	Aqeel Ur Rehman Khan	2,52,640	23.90	−6.52
RPD	D. P. Yadav	36,134	3.42	New
INC	Pramod Krishnam	16,034	1.52	−17.43
NOTA	NOTA	7,658	0.72	New
Majority		5,174	0.49	−1.49
Turnout		10,57,104	62.43	+9.60
BJP gain from BSP		Swing	+3.66	

=== 1980 ===
1980 Indian general election: Sambhal
Party	Candidate	Votes	%	±%
INC(I)	Bijendra Pal Singh	102,559	36.74	
JP(S)	Shanti Devi	86,792	31.09	
JP	Manphool Singh	48,400	17.34	
INC(U)	Mukhtar Ahmad	8,513	3.05	
IND	Vijay	8,389	3.01	
IND	Chamman alias Abdul Hafeej	5,741	2.06	
IND	Radhey Shyam	4,613	1.65	
IND	Kallu	3,095	1.11	
IND	Ratna alias Ram Ratan Singh	2,161	0.77	
IND	Ram Autar	2,068	0.74	
IND	Bhuvnesh Chandra	1,663	0.60	
IND	Sohan Singh	1,530	0.55	
IND	Sant Kumar	1,355	0.49	
BSP	Chandra Pal Singh Raghav	1,221	0.44	
IND	Chand Babu	1,037	0.37	
Majority		15,767	5.65	
Turnout		285,626	45.62	
Swing to INC(I) from JP		Swing		

=== 1977 ===
1977 Indian general election: Sambhal
Party	Candidate	Votes	%	±%
JP	Shanti Devi	214,520	64.29	
INC	Jugal Kishore	81,656	24.47	
IND	Safi Uddin Urf Manzar Safi	18,771	5.63	
IND	Gajnafar Ullah	8,239	2.47	
IND	Phool Singh	4,861	1.46	
IND	Bal Krishan	3,241	0.97	
IND	Zareeful Ahsan	2,377	0.71	
Majority		132,864	39.82	
Turnout		339,538	58.64	
JP win (new seat)				

== See also ==
- Sambhal
- Sambhal Assembly constituency
- List of constituencies of the Lok Sabha
- Sambhal News
