= 2024 Uttar Pradesh Legislative Assembly by-elections =

2024 Uttar Pradesh Legislative Assembly By-election
- 13 May 2024 (4 seats), 20 November 2024 (9 seats)

13 vacant seats in the Uttar Pradesh Legislative Assembly
- Turnout: 55%
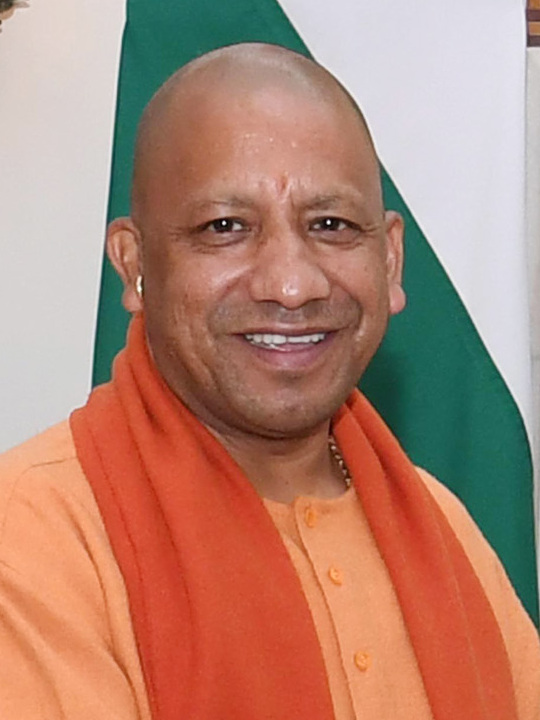

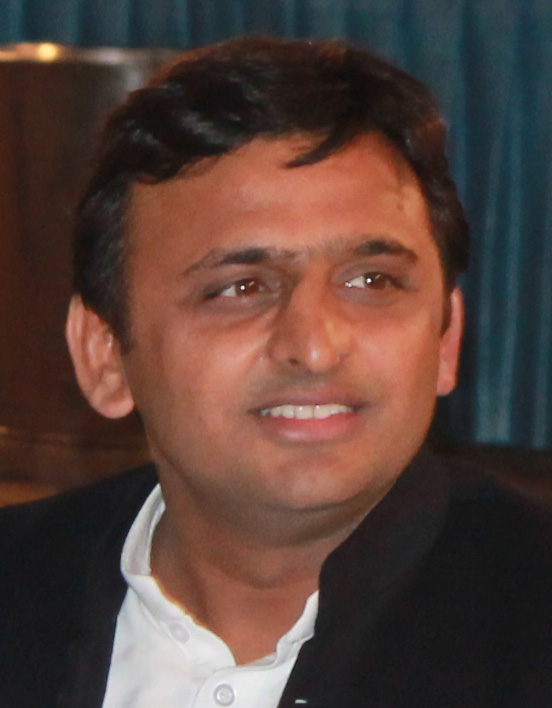
	Majority party	Minority party
Leader	Yogi Adityanath	Akhilesh Yadav
Party	BJP	SP
Alliance	NDA	SP+
Leader since	2017	2012
Leader's seat	Gorakhpur Urban	(Note: Akhilesh Yadav serves as the MP from Kannauj)
Last election	7	6
Seats won	9	4
Seat change	▲2	▼2
Popular vote	1,268,754	900,010
Percentage	49.89%	35.39%
Swing	▲ pp	▼ pp
Chief Minister before election
Yogi Adityanath
BJP
Chief Minister after election
Yogi Adityanath
BJP

By-elections to thirteen state assembly constituencies were held in Uttar Pradesh on 13 May 2024 for four seats and on 20 November 2024 for 9 seats. The results were announced on 4 June for 4 seats and 23 November for the rest of the seats. BJP, the ruling party won 8 out of 13 seats and its ally RLD won 1 seat. The Samajwadi Party won four.

== Background ==
The bye elections for Dadraul, Lucknow East and Gainsari were necessitated after their respective mla's died. The bye election in Dudhdhi was scheduled after its sitting mla was disqualified. All of these bypolls happened along with the 2024 Indian general election. The bypolls in rest of the constituencies (barring Sishamau), happened due to their mla's being elected to the Lok Sabha. The bye election to these 9 seats happened on 20 November and the results were declared on 23 November.

== Schedule ==
Poll event	Phase	
Poll event	I	II
Notification date	18 April	22 October
Last date for filing nomination	25 April 2024	29 October 2024
Scrutiny of nomination	26 April	30 October
Last date for withdrawal of nomination	29 April	4 November
Date of poll	13 May	20 November
Date of counting of votes	4 June	23 November
No. of constituencies	4	9

== Parties and alliances ==
=== National Democratic Alliance ===
National Democratic Alliance

Party	Flag	Symbol	Photo	Leader	Seats contested
Bharatiya Janata Party				Yogi Adityanath	12
Rashtriya Lok Dal				Jayant Chaudhary	1

=== Indian National Developmental Inclusive Alliance ===
Indian National Developmental Inclusive Alliance

Party	Flag	Symbol	Photo	Leader	Seats contested
Samajwadi Party				Akhilesh Yadav	12
Indian National Congress				Ajay Rai	1

=== Others ===
Party	Flag	Symbol	Photo	Leader	Seats contested
Bahujan Samaj Party				Mayawati	13

== Results ==
The BJP led alliance secured victory in 9 seats whereas the Samajwadi Party bagged four seats. Of these the BJP led alliance won 7 out of 9 seats in November bypolls whereas it won 2 out of 4 seats in the earlier bypolls. The SP won 2 seats in both the June and November bypoll. In the June bypoll, SP gained 1 seat but in the recent bypolls the BJP gained 2 seats. Thus, the BJP had a net gain of 1 seat in the election. 2,543,248 people voted in this election.

== Results by constituency ==
Constituency	Winner			Runner-up			Margin
Constituency	Candidate	Party	Votes	Candidate	Party	Votes	Margin
Dadraul	Arvind Kumar Singh	BJP	105,972	Avadhesh Kumar Verma	SP	89,177	16,795
Lucknow East	O. P. Srivastava	BJP	142,948	Mukesh Chauhan	INC	89,061	53,887
Gainsari	Rakesh Kumar Yadav	SP	87,120	Shailesh Kumar Singh	BJP	77,683	9,437
Duddhi (ST)	Vijay Singh Gond	SP	82,787	Saravan Kumar	BJP	79,579	3,208
Meerapur	Mithlesh Pal	RLD	84,304	Sumbul Rana	SP	53,508	30,796
Kundarki	Ramveer Singh	BJP	1,70,371	Mohammad Rizwan	SP	25,580	144,791
Ghaziabad	Sanjeev Sharma	BJP	96,946	Singh Raj Jatav	SP	27,595	96,946
Khair (SC)	Surender Diler	BJP	100,181	Charu Kain	SP	61,788	38,393
Karhal	Tej Pratap Singh Yadav	SP	104,304	Anujesh Pratap Singh	BJP	89,503	14,801
Sishamau	Naseem Solanki	SP	69,714	Suresh Awasthi	BJP	61,150	8,564
Phulpur	Deepak Patel	BJP	78,289	Mohammad Mujtaba Siddiqui	SP	66,984	11,305
Katehari	Dharmraj Nishad	BJP	104,091	Shobhawati Verma	SP	69,577	34,514
Majhawan	Suchismita Maurya	BJP	77,737	Jyoti Bind	SP	72,815	4,922

=== Uttar Pradesh ===
Date	Constituency		Previous MLA		Reason	Elected MLA	
13 May 2024	136	Dadraul	Manvendra Singh	Bharatiya Janata Party	Died on 5 January 2024	Arvind Kumar Singh	Bharatiya Janata Party
20 May 2024	173	Lucknow East	Ashutosh Tandon	Bharatiya Janata Party	Died on 9 November 2023	O. P. Srivastava	Bharatiya Janata Party
25 May 2024	292	Gainsari	Shiv Pratap Yadav	Samajwadi Party	Died on 28 January 2024	Rakesh Kumar Yadav	Samajwadi Party
1 June 2024	403	Duddhi (ST)	Ramdular Gaur	Bharatiya Janata Party	Disqualified on 15 December 2023	Vijay Singh Gond	Samajwadi Party
20 November 2024	16	Meerapur	Chandan Chauhan	Rashtriya Lok Dal	Elected to Lok Sabha on 4 June 2024	Mithlesh Pal	Rashtriya Lok Dal
20 November 2024	29	Kundarki	Ziaur Rahman Barq	Samajwadi Party	Elected to Lok Sabha on 4 June 2024	Ramveer Singh	Bharatiya Janata Party
20 November 2024	56	Ghaziabad	Atul Garg	Bharatiya Janata Party	Elected to Lok Sabha on 4 June 2024	Sanjeev Sharma	Bharatiya Janata Party
20 November 2024	71	Khair (SC)	Anoop Pradhan	Bharatiya Janata Party	Elected to Lok Sabha on 4 June 2024	Surender Diler	Bharatiya Janata Party
20 November 2024	110	Karhal	Akhilesh Yadav	Samajwadi Party	Elected to Lok Sabha on 4 June 2024	Tej Pratap Singh Yadav	Samajwadi Party
20 November 2024	213	Sishamau	Haji Irfan Solanki	Samajwadi Party	Disqualified on 7 June 2024	Naseem Solanki	Samajwadi Party
20 November 2024	256	Phulpur	Praveen Patel	Bharatiya Janata Party	Elected to Lok Sabha on 4 June 2024	Deepak Patel	Bharatiya Janata Party
20 November 2024	277	Katehari	Lalji Verma	Samajwadi Party	Elected to Lok Sabha on 4 June 2024	Dharmraj Nishad	Bharatiya Janata Party
20 November 2024	397	Majhawan	Vinod Kumar Bind	NISHAD Party	Elected to Lok Sabha on 4 June 2024	Suchismita Maurya	Bharatiya Janata Party
