= Shanti Devi (Uttar Pradesh politician) =

Indian politician

Member of the 6th Lok Sabha for Sambhal
- In office 1977–1980
- Succeeded by: Bijendra Pal Singh

Member of the 8th Lok Sabha for Sambhal
- In office 1984–1989
- Preceded by: Bijendra Pal Singh
- Succeeded by: Shripal Singh Yadav

Personal details
- Born: 30 January 1937 (age 89) Jarif Nagar, Badaun district, Uttar Pradesh, India
- Party: Indian National Congress (Indira)
- Other party: Janata Party (Secular); Bharatiya Lok Dal

Shanti Devi (born 1937) is an Indian former politician from the state of Uttar Pradesh. She has twice represented Sambhal in the Lok Sabha and has been a member of both houses of the Uttar Pradesh legislature.

== Early life ==
Shanti Devi is the daughter of Chaudhary Badan Singh Yadav and was born on 30 January 1937 at Jarif Nagar of Badaun district. She was educated till matriculation level.

== Career ==
From 1962 to 1968, Devi was a member of the Uttar Pradesh Legislative Council. She was elected to the Uttar Pradesh Legislative Assembly in 1974. Three years later, she stood for and won the 1977 Indian general election from Sambhal as a member of the Bharatiya Lok Dal, obtaining 64.29% of the total votes polled. In the next general election she joined the Janata Party (Secular) but lost to Bijendra Pal Singh of Indian National Congress (Indira) (INC (I)).

For the 1984 Indian general election Devi switched to INC (I) and won the seat, receiving 36.46% votes. After finishing her term of five years she stood for re-election from Sambhal but lost to S.P. Yadav of Janata Dal. She secured 39.28% votes and finished in the second place.

== Personal life ==
Devi has four sons from her marriage to Chaudhary Jagannath Singh Yadav.
