= Arvind Kumar Singh (Dadraul politician) =

Indian politician (1983)

Member of Legislative Assembly
- Incumbent
- Assumed office 2024
- Preceded by: Manvendra Singh
- Constituency: Dadraul

Personal details
- Born: Shahjahanpur
- Party: Bhartiya Janta Party
- Spouse: Mrs Baby Singh
- Children: 2

Arvind Kumar Singh (born 1983) is an Indian politician from Uttar Pradesh. He is the member of the Uttar Pradesh Legislative Assembly from Dadraul Assembly constituency in Shahjahanpur district. He won the 2024 Uttar Pradesh Legislative Assembly by-elections representing the Bharatiya Janata Party. He is the son of late Manvendra Singh who died of a liver disease after prolonged illness at the Institute of Liver and Biliary Sciences in New Delhi on 5 January 2024.

== Early life and education ==
Singh was from Dadraul, Shahjahanpur district, Uttar Pradesh. He was the son of late Manvendra Singh. He completed his M.Com. in 2009 & LLB in 2007 at S. S. College, Shahjahanpur which is affiliated with M.J.P.R.U. Bareilly

== Career ==
Singh won from Dadraul Assembly constituency representing Bharatiya Janata Party in the 2024 Uttar Pradesh Legislative Assembly by-elections. He polled 105,972 votes and defeated his nearest rival, Avadhesh Kumar Verma of the Samajwadi Party, by a margin of 16,795 votes.
