= Anisur Rahman =

Anisur Rahman (Arabic: انیس الرحمن) is a masculine Muslim given name, meaning companion of the Most Merciful. Notable bearers of the name include:

- Aneesur Rahman (1927–1987), Indian physicist
- Anisur Rahman Anis (c. 1940–2019), Bangladeshi film, television and theatre actor
- Anisur Rahman (politician, born 1952) (born 1952), Indian politician in West Bengal
- Anis-ur-Rehman (born 1970), Pakistani cricketer
- Anisur Rahman (cricketer) (born 1971), Bangladeshi cricketer and umpire
- Anisur Rahman Milon (born 1974), better known as Milon, Bangladeshi actor
- Aneesh Raman (born c. 1980), American journalist
- Anisur Rahman (Bangladeshi politician), Bangladeshi politician
- Anisur Rahman (Uttar Pradesh politician) (died 2004), Indian politician
- Anisur Rahman (economist) (1933–2025), Bangladeshi economist and intellectual
- Anisur Rahman (election commissioner) (born 1962), Bangladeshi civil servant and election commissioner
- Anisur Rahman Zico (born 1997), Bangladeshi footballer
