= Mohammad Irfan (politician) =

Indian politician

MLA, 16th Legislative Assembly
- In office March 2012 – 10 March 2016
- Preceded by: Het Ram (1962–1967)
- Succeeded by: Mohammad Faheem Irfan
- Constituency: Bilari

Personal details
- Born: 22 August 1951 Bilari, Uttar Pradesh, India
- Died: 10 March 2016 (aged 64) Budaun, Uttar Pradesh, India
- Cause of death: Traffic collision
- Party: Samajwadi Party
- Spouse: Nadra Parveen
- Children: 6
- Education: Kedar Nath Girdharilal Khatri PG College; M. J. P. Rohilkhand University
- Profession: Agriculturist & politician

Mohammad Irfan (22 August 1951 – 10 March 2016) was an Indian politician and a member of the 16th Legislative Assembly of Uttar Pradesh of India. He represented the Bilari constituency of Uttar Pradesh and was a member of the Samajwadi Party.

== Early life and education ==
Mohammad Irfan was born in Bilari, Moradabad, Uttar Pradesh. He held a Bachelor of Science and Bachelor of Laws degrees from Kedar Nath Girdharilal Khatri PG College and M. J. P. Rohilkhand University. Before being elected as MLA, he worked as an agriculturist and advocate.

== Political career ==
Irfan was a MLA for one term. He represented the Bilari (Assembly constituency) and was a member of the Samajwadi Party.

== Posts held ==
#	From	To	Position	Comments
01	March 2012	10 March 2016	Member, 16th Legislative Assembly	
