= Sambhal Assembly constituency =

Constituency of the Uttar Pradesh legislative assembly in India

Sambhal
- Constituency No. 33 for the Uttar Pradesh Legislative Assembly

Constituency details
- Country: India
- Region: North India
- State: Uttar Pradesh
- District: Sambhal
- Established: 1952
- Total electors: N.A.
- Reservation: None

Member of Legislative Assembly
- 18th Uttar Pradesh Legislative Assembly
- Incumbent Iqbal Mehmood
- Party: Samajwadi Party

Sambhal Vidhan Sabha (state legislature) constituency is a constituency of the sambhal district of Uttar Pradesh, India.

== Members of the Legislative Assembly ==
Year	Member	Party
1952	Jagdish Saran Rastogi	Indian National Congress
1952	Lekhraj Singh	Indian National Congress
1957	Mahmood Hasan Khan	Independent
1962	Mahmood Hasan Khan	Republican Party of India
1967	Mahesh Kumar	Bharatiya Jana Sangh
1969	Mahmood Hasan Khan	Bharatiya Kranti Dal
1974	Shafiqur Rahman Barq	Bharatiya Kranti Dal
1977	Shafiqur Rahman Barq	Janata Party
1980	Shariyatulla	Indian National Congress (I)
1985	Shafiqur Rahman Barq	Lokdal
1989	Shafiqur Rahman Barq	Janata Dal
1991	Iqbal Mehmood	Janata Dal
1993	Satya Prakash	Bharatiya Janata Party
1996	Iqbal Mehmood	Samajwadi Party
2002	Iqbal Mehmood	Samajwadi Party
2007	Iqbal Mehmood	Samajwadi Party
2012	Iqbal Mehmood	Samajwadi Party
2017	Iqbal Mehmood	Samajwadi Party
2022	Iqbal Mehmood	Samajwadi Party

== Election results ==
=== 2027 ===
2027 Uttar Pradesh Legislative Assembly election: Sambal
Party	Candidate	Votes	%	±%
NDA				
INDIA				
BSP				
AIMIM				
Majority				
Turnout				
gain from		Swing		

=== 2022 ===
2022 Uttar Pradesh Legislative Assembly election: Sambhal
Party	Candidate	Votes	%	±%
SP	Iqbal Mehmood	107,073	43.73	+10.89
BJP	Rajesh Singhal	65,376	26.7	+1.84
BSP	Shakil Ahamad	44,443	18.15	+2.94
AIMIM	Mushir Khan Tarin	21,470	8.77	−15.82
INC	Nida Ahmad	2,256	0.92	
NOTA	None of the above	1,204	0.49	−0.21
Majority		41,697	17.03	+9.05
Turnout		244,853	64.47	−3.86
SP hold		Swing	+10.66%	

=== 2017 ===
17th Vidhan Sabha: 2017 general elections

2017 Uttar Pradesh Legislative Assembly election: Sambhal
Party	Candidate	Votes	%	±%
SP	Iqbal Mehmood	79,248	32.84	
BJP	Arvind Gupta	59,976	24.86	
AIMIM	Zia ur Rahman Barq	59,336	24.59	
BSP	Rafatulla Khan	36,705	15.21	
NOTA	None of the above	1,683	0.7	
Majority		19,272	7.98	
Turnout		241,294	68.33	
SP hold		Swing		

=== 2012 ===
2012 general elections: Sambhal
Party	Candidate	Votes	%	±%
SP	Iqbal Mehmood	79,692	40.70	+7.26
BJP	Rajesh Singhal	49,773	25.38	+0.39
BSP	Rafatulla Khan	46,062	23.56	+0.32
RLD	Haji Azeem	10,512	5.36	−3.43

=== 2007 ===
2007 general elections: Sambhal
Party	Candidate	Votes	%	±%
SP	Iqbal Mehmood	46,096	33.44	−2.69
BJP	Rajesh Singhal	34,436	24.99	−
BSP	Taranum Akhil	32,034	23.24	+6.34
RLD	Mamlok ur Rahman Barq	12,112	8.79	−4.58

=== 2002 ===
2002 general elections: Sambhal
Party	Candidate	Votes	%	±%
SP	Iqbal Mehmood	52,562	36.13	−
RPD	Shafiqur Rahman Barq	31,256	21.49	−
BSP	Mohammad Shafiq Khan	24,584	16.90	−
RLD	Maggu Singh	19,452	13.37	−
