= Rammurti Singh Verma =

Indian politician (1950–2021)

Rammurti Singh Verma राममूर्ति सिंह वर्मा

MLA, 16th Legislative Assembly
- In office March 2012 – March 2017
- Preceded by: Avadhesh Kumar Verma
- Succeeded by: Manvendra Singh
- Constituency: Dadraul

MP, 11th parliament assembly
- In office may 1996 – march 1998
- Preceded by: Satyapal Singh Yadav
- Succeeded by: Satyapal Singh Yadav
- Constituency: Shahjahanpur

Personal details
- Born: 29 July 1950 Shahjahanpur district
- Died: 23 April 2021 (aged 70) Bareilly, Uttar Pradesh, India
- Party: Samajwadi Party
- Spouse: Somwati Devi (wife)
- Children: Rajesh Verma & Two daughters
- Parent: Rohan Singh (father)
- Education: Sampurnanand Sanskrit University
- Profession: Politician & Lawyer

Rammurti Singh Verma (Hindi: राममूर्ति सिंह वर्मा; 29 July 1950 – 23 April 2021) was an Indian politician and a member of the Sixteenth Legislative Assembly of Uttar Pradesh in India. He represented the Dadraul constituency of Uttar Pradesh and was a member of the Samajwadi Party political party. He died in April 2021, aged 70.

== Early life and education ==
Rammurti Singh Verma was born in Shahjahanpur district in Lodhi community. He attended the Sampurnanand Sanskrit University and attained Bachelor of Art degree.

== Political career ==
Rammurti Singh Verma was a four time MLA—three times from Jalalabad seat and once from Dadraul. He also represented Shahjahanpur in Lok Sabha and was a member of the Samajwadi Party political party. He lost his seat in the 2017 Uttar Pradesh Assembly election to Manvendra Singh of the Bharatiya Janata Party.

== Controversy ==
There was a probe against Verma for the murder of journalist Jagendra Singh, who was allegedly set on fire by the minister and five others on 1 June after which he died on 8 June during treatment. An FIR was registered against Ram Murti Verma, Inspector (Chowk) Sri Prakash Rai, Gufran, Akash Gupta, Amit Pratap Singh and Bhure for killing Jagendra by setting him afire. The FIR was registered at Puwayan police station of Shahjahanpur, by the victim's son Raghvendra, after his father died during treatment at a hospital.

== Posts held ==
#	From	To	Position	Comments
01	2012	2017	Member, Minister In 16th Legislative Assembly	
02	1990	1991	Deputy Minister, Social Welfare, Govt Of Uttar Pradesh	
03	1993	1995	Member, Uttar Pradesh Legislative Assembly	
04	1994	1995	Member, Committee on Public Undertakings, Uttar Pradesh Legislative Assembly	
05	1996	1996	Elected to 11th Lok Sabha	
06	2001	2002	Re-elected to 13th Lok Sabha (2nd term) (elected in bye-election)	
07	2002	2004	Member, Committee on Home Affairs	

== See also ==
- Dadraul (Assembly constituency)
- Sixteenth Legislative Assembly of Uttar Pradesh
- Uttar Pradesh Legislative Assembly
- Kanth
