= Mohammad Rizwan (politician) =

Indian politician

Member of the Uttar Pradesh Legislative Assembly
- In office Mar 2012 – March 2022
- Preceded by: Akbar Husain
- Succeeded by: Ziaur Rahman Barq
- Constituency: Kundarki
- In office Feb 2002 – May 2007
- Preceded by: Akbar Husain
- Succeeded by: Akbar Husain
- Constituency: Kundarki

Personal details
- Born: 4 July 1953 (age 73) Moradabad district, Uttar Pradesh, India
- Party: Samajwadi Party (1996–present)
- Spouse: Naeema Begum
- Children: 3 sons and 2 daughters
- Education: Kedar Nath Girdharilal Khatri PG College
- Profession: Agriculturist & Politician

Mohammad Rizwan is an Indian politician and was a member of the 14th, 16th and 17th Legislative Assembly of Uttar Pradesh from the Kundarki constituency. He is a member of the Samajwadi Party.

== Early life and education ==
Mohammad Rizwan was born in Moradabad district, Uttar Pradesh. He holds a bachelor's degree from Kedar Nath Girdharilal Khatri PG College in Moradabad. Before being elected as MLA, he used to work as an agriculturist.

== Political career ==
Mohammad Rizwan has been a MLA for three terms. He represented the Kundarki constituency during his terms and is a member of the Samajwadi Party.

== Posts Held ==
#	From	To	Position	Comments
01	2002	2007	Member, 14th Legislative Assembly	
02	2012	2017	Member, 16th Legislative Assembly	
03	Mar-2017	2022	Member, 17th Legislative Assembly	

== See also ==
- Kundarki
- Politics of India
- Sixteenth Legislative Assembly of Uttar Pradesh
- Uttar Pradesh Legislative Assembly
