= Kundarki Assembly constituency =

Legislative Assembly constituency in Uttar Pradesh State, India

Coordinates: 28.69°N 78.78°E

Kundarki
- Constituency No. 29 for the Uttar Pradesh Legislative Assembly

Constituency details
- Country: India
- Region: North India
- State: Uttar Pradesh
- District: Moradabad
- Lok Sabha constituency: Sambhal
- Total electors: 380,673
- Reservation: None

Member of Legislative Assembly
- 18th Uttar Pradesh Legislative Assembly
- Incumbent Ramveer Singh
- Party: Bharatiya Janata Party
- Elected year: 2024

Kundarki is one of the 403 Legislative Assembly constituencies of Uttar Pradesh state in India.

It is part of Moradabad district.

== Members of the Legislative Assembly ==
Year	Member	Party
1967	M. Lal	Independent
1969	Mahi Lal	Bharatiya Kranti Dal
1974	Indra Mohini	Indian National Congress
1977	Akbar Husain	Janata Party
1980	Akbar Husain	Janata Party
1985	Rina Kumari	Indian National Congress
1989	Chandra Vijay Singh	Janata Dal
1991	Akbar Husain	Janata Dal
1993	Chandra Vijay Singh	Bharatiya Janta Party
1996	Akbar Husain	Bahujan Samaj Party
2002	Mohammad Rizwan	Samajwadi Party
2007	Akbar Husain	Bahujan Samaj Party
2012	Mohammad Rizwan	Samajwadi Party
2017	Mohammad Rizwan	Samajwadi Party
2022	Ziaur Rahman Barq	Samajwadi Party
2024^	Ramveer Singh	Bharatiya Janata Party

^ denotes bypoll

== Election results ==
=== 2027 ===
2027 Uttar Pradesh Legislative Assembly election: Kundarki
Party	Candidate	Votes	%	±%
BJP				
SP				
AIMIM				
ASP(KR)				
Majority				
Turnout				
		Swing		

=== 2024 bypoll ===
Uttar Pradesh Legislative Assembly by-election, 2024: Kundarki
Party	Candidate	Votes	%	±%
BJP	Ramveer Singh	170,371	76.71	▲46.31
SP	Mohammad Rizwan	25,580	11.52	▼34.76
ASP(KR)	Chand Babu	14,201	6.39	New
AIMIM	Mohammad Waris	8,111	3.65	▼1.59
BSP	Rafitullah Khan	1,099	0.49	▼15.24
NOTA	None of the Above	581	0.26	
Majority		144,791	65.19	▲49.31
Turnout		222,097	57.70	
BJP gain from SP		Swing	▲46.31	

=== 2022 ===
2022 Uttar Pradesh Legislative Assembly election: Kundarki
Party	Candidate	Votes	%	±%
SP	Ziaur Rahman Barq	125,792	46.28	▲4.45
BJP	Kamal Kumar	82,630	30.40	▼7.33
BSP	Mohammad Rizwan	42,742	15.73	▲2.08
AIMIM	Mohammad Waris	14,251	5.24	▲2.58
NOTA	None of the above	1,787	0.66	▲0.22
Majority		43,162	15.88	▲11.78
Turnout		271,785	71.4	▲0.01
SP hold		Swing		

=== 2017 ===
2017 Uttar Pradesh Legislative Assembly election: Kundarki
Party	Candidate	Votes	%	±%
SP	Mohammad Rizwan	110,561	41.83	
BJP	Ramveer Singh	99,740	37.73	
BSP	Akbar Husain	36,071	13.65	
AIMIM	Israr Hussain	7,025	2.66	
RLD	Mohammad Nabi	4,078	1.54	
NOTA	None of the above	1,170	0.44	
Majority		10,821	4.10	
Turnout		264,330	71.39	
SP hold		Swing		

== See also ==
- List of constituencies of the Uttar Pradesh Legislative Assembly
- Moradabad district
