= Kedar Nath Girdharilal Khatri PG College Moradabad =

K.G.K. PG College, Moradabad
- Type: Government
- Established: 1948
- Affiliations: M. J. P. Rohilkhand University
- Principal: Dr. Shashidhar Dwivedi
- Location: Moradabad, Uttar Pradesh, India
- Campus: Urban
- Website: kgkpgcollege.edu.in

K.G.K. PG College is well-known college in Moradabad district. K.G.K. PG College formerly affiliated to Agra University and later with M. J. P. Rohilkhand University in 1973. The full name of K.G.K. PG College is Kedar Nath Girdharilal Khatri PG College.

K.G.K. College was established in 1944 as a primary school. The late educationalist Sahu Girdhari Lal ji and his son Sahu Sambhu Nath Khanna ji established it as a degree college in 1948. For the last 58 years, the college has served education needs in Moradabad and nearby cities.

== Courses ==
K.G.K. College provides courses in the Arts and Sciences streams. The courses are offered by the college in accordance with the syllabi and prescriptions of the M. J. P. Rohilkhand University.

=== Graduate programs ===
- Arts: BA in Hindi, Sanskrit, English, Geography, History, Economics, Sociology, Political Science, Psychology, Philosophy, Mathematics, Defense Studies
- Science: B.Sc in Mathematics, Physics, Chemistry, Botany, Zoology, Economics, Geography, Defense Studies
- Law: LL.B.

=== Undergraduate programs ===
- Arts: Hindi, Sanskrit, English, Geography, Economics, History, Sociology, Philosophy, Political Science, Psychology, Mathematics
- Science: Mathematics, Physics, Chemistry

=== Research programs ===
- Ph.D.: Hindi, Sanskrit, English, Geography, Economics, History, Sociology, Philosophy, Political Science, Psychology, Mathematics, Physics, Chemistry

== Faculties ==
- Department of Economics
- Department of English
- Department of Geography
- Department of History
- Department of Hindi
- Department of Political Science
- Department of Psychology
- Department of Philosophy
- Department of Sociology
- Department of Sanskrit
- Department of Defense Studies
- Department of Physics
- Department of Chemistry
- Department of Mathematics
- Department of Law
- Department of Commerce

== Notable alumni ==
- Samarpal Singh, Member of the Uttar Pradesh Legislative Assembly
- Mohammad Rizwan, MLA
- Mohd Faeem, MLA

== See also ==
- Moradabad
- Government Degree College Sambhal
