= Hoti Lal Agarwal =

Indian politician (1901–1980)

Member of Parliament in 1st Lok Sabha
- In office 1952–1957
- Constituency: Jalaun District cum Etawah District (West) cum Jhansi District (North) constituency

MLA in 1962 Uttar Pradesh Assembly
- In office 1962–1967
- Constituency: Etawah constituency

Personal details
- Born: 12 January 1901 Khera Hajipur Village (Agra District)
- Died: 13 September 1980 (aged 79)
- Party: Indian National Congress
- Spouse: Shrimati Sushila Devi Agarwal (1927)
- Children: 4 sons and 3 daughters
- Parent: Lala Lalaram Agarwal (father)
- Education: M.A., LL.B
- Alma mater: Allahabad University

Hoti Lal Agarwal (12 January 1901 – 13 September 1980) was an Indian politician and served as a Member of Parliament in 1st Lok Sabha from Jalaun District cum Etawah District (West) cum Jhansi District (North) constituency.

== Early life and background ==
Hoti Lal Agarwal was born on 12 January 1901 in Khera Hajipur village (Agra District). Lala Lalaram Agarwal was his father.

Hoti Lal completed his schooling at Government High School - Etawah and Agra College - Agra, D.A.V. College - Kanpur and Allahabad University.

== Personal life ==
Hoti Lal Agarwal married Shrimati Sushila Devi Agarwal on 5 April 1927, and the couple has 4 sons and 3 daughters.

== Political life ==
Hoti Lal Agarwal took part in the non-co-operation movement (from 1920 continued till 1926), He actively took part in other moments like the "No-rent campaign" in 1932, "Salt sathyagraha" and "Quit India Movement". He was imprisoned four times, twice in 1930, once in 1932, and once in 1940. He was detained in 1942 for two years.

== Position held ==
| # | From | To | Position | Party |
|---|---|---|---|---|
| 1. | 1937 | - | Elected as M.L.A., U.P. | |
| 2. | 1946 | - | Elected as M.L.A., U.P. | |
| 3. | 1952 | 1957 | MP in 1st Lok Sabha from Jalaun District cum Etawah District (West) cum Jhansi District (North) constituency | Congress |
| 4. | 1962 | 1967 | MLA in 1962 Uttar Pradesh Assembly from Etawah constituency | Congress |
