= Dadraul Assembly constituency =

Constituency of the Uttar Pradesh legislative assembly in India

Dadraul
- Constituency No. 136 for the Uttar Pradesh Legislative Assembly

Constituency details
- Country: India
- Region: North India
- State: Uttar Pradesh
- District: Shahjahanpur
- Lok Sabha constituency: Shahjahanpur
- Established: 1967
- Total electors: 3,55,882 (2022)
- Reservation: None

Member of Legislative Assembly
- 18th Uttar Pradesh Legislative Assembly
- Incumbent Arvind Kumar Singh
- Party: BJP
- Elected year: 2024

Dadraul Assembly constituency is one of the 403 constituencies of the Uttar Pradesh Legislative Assembly, India. It is a part of the Shahjahanpur district and one of the five assembly constituencies in the Shahjahanpur Lok Sabha constituency. First election in this assembly constituency was held in 1967 after the "DPACO (1967)" (delimitation order) was passed in 1967. After the "Delimitation of Parliamentary and Assembly Constituencies Order" was passed in 2008, the constituency was assigned identification number 136.

== Wards / Areas ==
Extent of Dadraul Assembly constituency is KCs Madanapur, Kant, Jamaur, Dadraul, Sehramau Dakshini & Kant NP of Shahjahanpur Tehsil.

== Members of the Legislative Assembly ==
Term	Name	Party
constituency not created
1967	Ram Murti Anchal	Indian National Congress
1969	Ram Murti Anchal	Indian National Congress
1974	Girija Kishore Mishra	Independent politician
1977	Mansoor Ali	Independent politician
1980	Nazir Ali	Janata Party
1985	Ram Autar Mishra	Indian National Congress
1989	Ram Autar Mishra	Indian National Congress
1991	Devendra Pal Singh	Janata Dal
1993	Ram Autar Mishra	Indian National Congress
1996	Ram Autar Mishra	Indian National Congress
2002	Avadhesh Kumar Verma	Bahujan Samaj Party
2007	Avadhesh Kumar Verma	Bahujan Samaj Party
2012	Rammurti Singh Verma	Samajwadi Party
2017	Manvendra Singh	Bharatiya Janata Party
2022	Manvendra Singh	Bharatiya Janata Party
2024-by	Arvind Kumar Singh	Bharatiya Janata Party

== Election results ==
=== 2027 ===
2027 Uttar Pradesh Legislative Assembly election: Dadrual
Party	Candidate	Votes	%	±%
INDIA				
NDA				
BSP				
NOTA	None of the above			
Majority				
Turnout				
gain from		Swing		

=== 2024 bypoll ===
Uttar Pradesh Legislative Assembly by-election, 2024: Dadraul
Party	Candidate	Votes	%	±%
BJP	Arvind Kumar Singh	105,972	48	▲2.94
SP	Avadhesh Kumar Verma	89,177	40.39	▼0.34
BSP	Sarvesh Chandra Mishra	20,742	9.4	▼0.27
NOTA	None of the Above	1,322	0.6	▲0.16
Majority		16,795	7.61	▲3.28
Turnout		2,20,766	58.48	▼4.51
BJP hold		Swing		

=== 2022 ===
Uttar Pradesh Legislative Assembly election, 2022: Dadraul
Party	Candidate	Votes	%	±%
BJP	Manvendra Singh	100,957	45.06	▲5.15
SP	Rajesh Kumar Verma	91,256	40.73	▲8.85
BSP	Chandraketu Maurya	21,671	9.67	▼13.77
NOTA	None of the above	993	0.44	▼0.67
Majority		9,701	4.33	▼3.7
Turnout		224,055	62.96	▼2.62
BJP hold		Swing		

=== 2017 ===
Uttar Pradesh Legislative Assembly election, 2017: Dadraul
Party	Candidate	Votes	%	±%
BJP	Manvendra Singh	86,435	39.91	
SP	Rammurti Singh Verma	69,037	31.88	
BSP	Rizwan Ali	50,762	23.44	
CPI	Roopa	2,387	1.1	
NOTA	None of the above	2,383	1.11	
Majority		17,398	8.03	
Turnout		216,563	65.58	
BJP gain from SP		Swing	▲10.56	

=== 2012 ===
Uttar Pradesh Legislative Assembly election, 2012: Dadraul
Party	Candidate	Votes	%	±%
SP	Rammurti Singh Verma	61,967	29.35	–
BSP	Rizwan Ali	57,088	27.04	–
BJP	Avadhesh Kumar Verma	28,845	13.66	–
MD	Devendra Pal Singh	28,241	13.38	–
INC	Kaushal Kumar Mishra	21,186	10.04	–
PECP	Arvind	4,408	2.09	–
Majority		4,879	2.31	–
Turnout		211,116	69.80	–
SP gain from BSP		Swing	–	

== See also ==
- Shahjahanpur district
- Shahjahanpur Lok Sabha constituency
- Sixteenth Legislative Assembly of Uttar Pradesh
- Uttar Pradesh Legislative Assembly
- Vidhan Bhawan
