= Bijendra Pal Singh =

Indian politician

Members of Parliament 7th Lok Sabha
- Constituency: Sambhal

Personal details
- Political party: Indian National Congress

Bijendra Pal Singh is an Indian politician. He is a member of the Uttar Pradesh parliament Sambhal (Lok Sabha constituency). He first got elected in 1980 as a member of the Indian National Congress political party.
