= Sripal Singh Yadav =

Indian politician

Member of Parliament, Lok Sabha
- In office 1989-1996
- Preceded by: Shanti Devi
- Succeeded by: D. P. Yadav
- Constituency: Sambhal, Uttar Pradesh

Personal details
- Born: 6 April 1942 (age 84) Ahrolanawabad, Budaun district, United Provinces, British India, (present-day Uttar Pradesh, India)
- Party: Janata Dal
- Spouse: Raj Kumari

Sripal Singh Yadav is an Indian politician. He was elected to the Lok Sabha, the lower house of the Parliament of India as a member of the Janata Dal.
