= Mahmood Hasan Khan (sambhal) =

Indian politician

Mahmood Hassan Khan

3rd Legislative Assembly of Uttar Pradesh
- Constituency: Sambhal

Personal details
- Political party: Republican Party of India

Mahmood Hasaan Khan is an Indian politician who is a member of the 3rd Legislative Assembly of Uttar Pradesh for the Sambhal Assembly constituency as a member of the Republican Party of India.
