= Bilari Assembly constituency =

Constituency of the Uttar Pradesh legislative assembly in India

Coordinates: 28.62°N 78.8°E

Bilari
- Constituency No. 30 for the Uttar Pradesh Legislative Assembly

Constituency details
- Country: India
- Region: North India
- State: Uttar Pradesh
- District: Moradabad
- Lok Sabha constituency: Sambhal
- Total electors: 359,209
- Reservation: None

Member of Legislative Assembly
- 18th Uttar Pradesh Legislative Assembly
- Incumbent Mohd Faheem Irfan
- Party: Samajwadi Party
- Elected year: 2022

Bilari is one of the 403 Legislative Assembly constituencies of Uttar Pradesh state in India.

It is split between Moradabad district and Sambhal.

== Members of the Legislative Assembly ==
| Year | Member | Party |
|---|---|---|
| 1951 | Mahi Lal | Indian National Congress |
| 1951 | Har Sahai | Indian National Congress |
| 1957 | Mahi Lal | Indian National Congress |
| 1957 | Har Sahai | Indian National Congress |
| 1962 | Het Ram | Praja Socialist Party |
Constituency abolished
| 2012 | Mohammad Irfan | Samajwadi Party |
| 2016 (Note: by-election) | Mohammed Faeem | Samajwadi Party |
| 2017 | Mohammed Faeem | Samajwadi Party |
| 2022 | Mohammed Faeem | Samajwadi Party |

== Election results ==
=== 2027 ===
2027 Uttar Pradesh Legislative Assembly election: Bilari
| Party | Candidate | Votes | % | ±% |
|---|---|---|---|---|
| INDIA | | | | |
| NDA | | | | |
| BSP | | | | |
| NOTA | None of the above | | | |
| Majority | | | | |
| Turnout | | | | |
| gain from | | Swing | | |

=== 2022 ===
2022 Uttar Pradesh Legislative Assembly election: Bilari
| Party | Candidate | Votes | % | ±% |
|---|---|---|---|---|
| SP | Mohammed Faeem | 95,338 | 39.92 | +2.52 |
| BJP | Parmeshwer Lal Saini | 87,728 | 36.73 | +5.2 |
| BSP | Anil Kumar Chaudhary | 42,411 | 17.76 | −8.85 |
| AIMIM | Khalid Zaman | 9,235 | 3.87 | |
| NOTA | None of the above | 1,417 | 0.59 | +0.1 |
| Majority | | 7,610 | 3.19 | −2.68 |
| Turnout | | 238,844 | 66.49 | −0.13 |
| SP hold | | Swing | | |

=== 2017 ===
2017 Uttar Pradesh Legislative Assembly election: Bilari
| Party | Candidate | Votes | % | ±% |
|---|---|---|---|---|
| SP | Mohammed Faeem | 85,682 | 37.4 | |
| BJP | Suresh Saini | 72,241 | 31.53 | |
| BSP | Rishipal Singh | 60,976 | 26.61 | |
| PECP | Arif Husain | 2,666 | 1.16 | |
| RLD | Anil Chaudhary | 2,493 | 1.09 | |
| NOTA | None of the above | 1,123 | 0.49 | |
| Majority | | 13,441 | 5.87 | |
| Turnout | | 229,116 | 66.62 | |
| SP hold | | Swing | | |

== See also ==
- List of constituencies of the Uttar Pradesh Legislative Assembly
- Moradabad district
