= Akbar Husain =

Indian politician

Member of Uttar Pradesh Legislative Assembly
- Constituency: Kundarki

Personal details
- Party: Bahujan Samaj Party
- Other political affiliations: Janata Party

Akbar Husain is an Indian politician who served as member of the 4th, 5th, 7th and 9th Legislative Assembly of Uttar Pradesh from the Kundarki Assembly constituency. He has represented the Janata Party and the Bahujan Samaj Party.
