= Manvendra Singh (Dadraul politician) =

Indian politician (1955 to 2024)

Manvendra Singh (born 1955 – 5 January 2024) was an Indian politician from Uttar Pradesh. He was a two time member of the Uttar Pradesh Legislative Assembly from Dadraul Assembly constituency in Shahjahanpur district. He won the 2022 Uttar Pradesh Legislative Assembly election representing the Bharatiya Janata Party.

== Early life and education ==
Singh was from Dadraul, Shahjahanpur district, Uttar Pradesh. He was the son of late Sherbahadur Singh. He completed his LLB in 1985 at D.A.V. College, which is affiliated with Lucknow University.

== Career ==
Singh won from Dadraul Assembly constituency representing Bharatiya Janata Party in the 2022 Uttar Pradesh Legislative Assembly election. He polled 100,957 votes and defeated his nearest rival, Rajesh Kumar Verma of the Samajwadi Party, by a margin of 9,701 votes. After being in the Indian National Congress for a long time, he joined the BJP in 2017 and won the 2017 Uttar Pradesh Legislative Assembly election representing BJP from Dadraul defeating four time MLA, Rammurti Verma, of Samajwadi Party.

=== Death ===
Singh died of a liver disease after prolonged illness at the Institute of Liver and Biliary Sciences in New Delhi on 5 January 2024.
