= Iqbal Mehmood =

Indian politician

Member of the Uttar Pradesh Legislative Assembly
- Incumbent
- Assumed office 1996
- Preceded by: Satya Prakash
- Constituency: Sambhal

Personal details
- Born: 21 November 1949 (age 76) Sambhal, Uttar Pradesh, India
- Citizenship: Indian
- Party: Samajwadi Party
- Spouse: Rukhsana Iqbal
- Children: 3 sons (Suhail Iqbal)
- Parent: Mehmood Hasan Khan (father)
- Education: Aligarh Muslim University
- Profession: Politician

Iqbal Mehmood (born 21 November 1949) is an Indian politician and a member of the Uttar Pradesh Legislative Assembly from Sambhal. He is the senior leader of Samajwadi Party.

== Early life and education ==
Iqbal Mehmood holds Bachelor of Science degree from Aligarh Muslim University in 1974.

== Political career ==
Iqbal Mehmood has been an MLA seven times, first from 1991 to 1992, and then for six consecutive terms starting in 1996 for which he is now the incumbent. He represented the Sambhal constituency and is a member of the Samajwadi Party.
