= Kazi Jalil Abbasi =

Indian politician and freedom fighter

- Born: Kazi Jalil Abbasi; 12 February 1912; Bayara Village, Basti, Uttar Pradesh
- Died: 11 July 1996 (aged 84)
- Citizenship: India
- Education: B.A., LL.B.; Aligarh Muslim University; Arabic College, Delhi; Lucknow University.
- Occupations: Agriculturist, lawyer and politician.
- Years active: 1937–1996
- Political party: Congress.
- Spouse: Mrs. Shahida Khatoon.
- Children: 5
- Parent: Qazi Mohammad Bismillah Abbasi (father)

Kazi Jalil Abbasi (1912-1996) was a freedom fighter and member of the 7th Lok Sabha and the 8th Lok Sabha of India. He also represented the Domariaganj constituency of Uttar Pradesh and was a member of the Indian National Congress (I).

== Early life and education ==
Abbasi holds B.A. & LL.B degrees from Aligarh Muslim University, Arabic College (Delhi) and Lucknow University. In 1937, Jalil was expelled from Aligarh Muslim University for being involved in political activities.

On 17 December 1940, he was arrested in Lucknow under section 38 of Defense of India Rules. His autobiography "Kya din the" gives a detailed account of his life.

== Posts held ==
#	From	To	Position
01	1971	1974	Minister of State Government of Uttar Pradesh
02	1956	1968	President, District Congress Committee, Basti
03	1980	Till death	President, District Congress Committee, Basti
04	1946	Till death	Member, Uttar Pradesh Congress Committee
05	1962	Till death	Member, All India Congress Committee
06	1962	Till death	President, Rafi Ahmad Kidwai Memorial Trust, Basti
07	1962	Till death	Nehru Literary Association, Lucknow
08	1962	1974	Member, Uttar Pradesh Legislative Assembly
09	1980	1984	Member, Seventh Lok Sabha
10	1984	1989	Member, Eighth Lok Sabha

== See also ==
- List of members of the 15th Lok Sabha of India
