= Anisur Rahman (Uttar Pradesh politician) =

Anisur Rahman (died 2004) was an Indian politician of 3rd Legislative Assembly (1962–67) of Uttar Pradesh representing Indian National Congress. He represented 16-Tanakpur Vidhan Sabha seat which included Tanakpur, Sitarganj, Nanakmatta, Khatima, Amariya. The seat was part of Nainital district. He was part of the U.P government under first women chief minister Sucheta Kripalani.

He belongs to Rayeen tribe of Sunni Muslims. His native place was Dherum Sukatia village of Pilibhit. He contested second time from Pilibhit assembly in 1974 and lost by a thin margin of 3887 votes. He remained active in the politics till 2000 and held key posts in the congress committee as PCC member and district vice president and General secretary.

== See also ==
- Kazi Jalil Abbasi
- Zulfikar Ali Khan
