= Thakur Ramveer Singh =

Indian politician from Uttar Pradesh

Ramveer Singh

Member of the Uttar Pradesh Legislative Assembly
- Incumbent
- Assumed office 24 November 2024
- Preceded by: Zia ur Rahman Barq
- Constituency: Kundarki

Personal details
- Party: Bharatiya Janata Party
- Education: Post Graduate in MA
- Alma mater: Hindu College, Moradabad
- Occupation: Politician, Farmer
- Profession: Self-employed

Ramveer Singh, or Ramveer Thakur is an Indian politician of Bharatiya Janata Party from Uttar Pradesh. He is member of Legislative Assembly from Kundarki from 2024.

== Political career ==
He was born in a farmer family and joined Bharatiya Janata Party in 1993 and was assigned position of Secretary of Bharatiya Kisan Sangh of Moradabad district in 1999. He has been contesting from Kundarki from 2007 and won the seat in 2024 by-election by a record margin of more than 140,000 votes making party bag the seat after 31 years.
