= 1962 Uttar Pradesh Legislative Assembly election =

- February 19, 1962

430 seats in the Uttar Pradesh Legislative Assembly 216 seats needed for a majority
- Registered: 36,661,578
- Turnout: 18,859,667 (51.44%) ▲6.67%
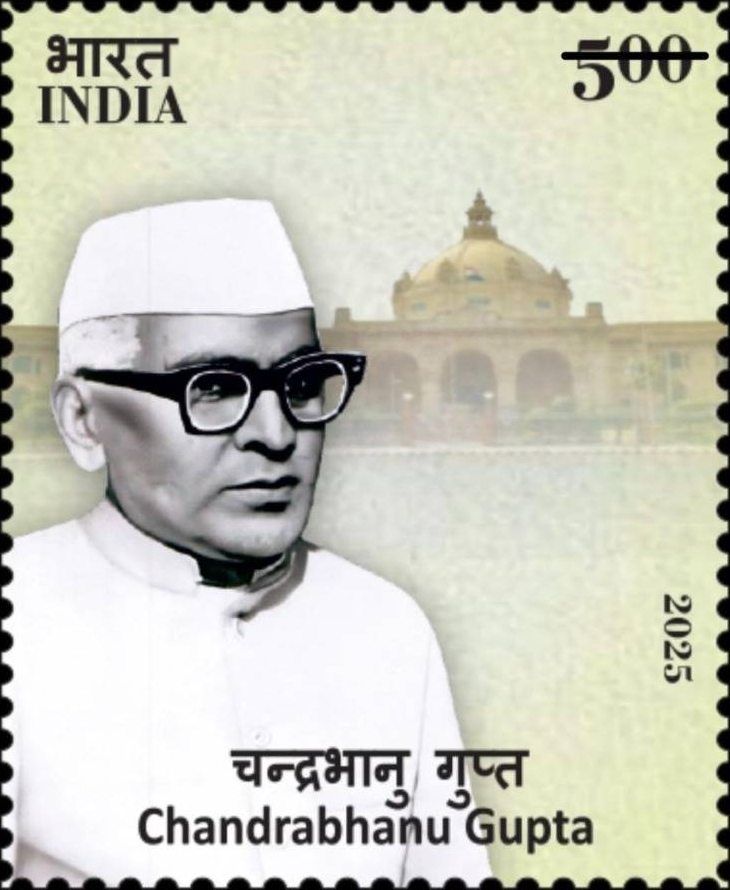

	Majority party	Minority party	Third party
			PSP
Leader	Chandra Bhanu Gupta	Yadavendra Dutt Dubey
Party	INC	ABJS	PSP
Leader's seat	Ranikhet South
Last election	286 seats, 42.42%	17 seats, 9.84%	44 seats, 14.47%
Seats won	249	49	38
Seat change	▼37	▲32	▼6
Popular vote	6,471,669	2,931,809	2,052,890
Percentage	36.33%	16.46%	11.52%
Swing	▼6.09%	▲6.62%	▼2.95%
Chief Minister before election
Chandra Bhanu Gupta
INC
Elected Chief Minister
Chandra Bhanu Gupta
INC

The 1962 election to the Uttar Pradesh Legislative Assembly in India resulted in the re-election of Chandra Bhanu Gupta of the Indian National Congress as Chief Minister of Uttar Pradesh. His election manager Nirmal Chandra Chaturvedi had played a major role in getting him elected. Congress retained a commanding majority despite losing some seats to the Bharatiya Jana Sangh.

== Results by party ==
Party	Votes	%	+/–	Seats	+/–
Indian National Congress	6,471,669	36.33	▼6.09%	249	▼37
Bharatiya Jana Sangh	2,931,809	16.46	▲6.62%	49	▲32
Praja Socialist Party	2,052,890	11.52	▼2.95%	38	▼6
Socialist Party	1,462,359	8.21		24	–
Swatantra Party	819,748	4.60	new party	15	new party
Communist Party of India	905,696	5.08	▲1.25%	14	▲5
Republican Party of India	665,361	3.74	new party	8	new party
Hindu Mahasabha	188,581	1.06		2	–
Akhil Bharatiya Ram Rajya Parishad	52,290	0.29	▼0.47%	0	Steady
Independents	2,263,611	12.71	▼15.97%	31	▼43
Total	17,814,014	100.00	–	430	Steady
Valid votes	17,814,014	94.46			
Invalid/blank votes	1,045,653	5.54			
Total votes	18,859,667	100.00			
Registered voters/turnout	36,661,578	51.44			

== Elected members ==
Constituency	Reserved for (SC/ST/None)	Member	Party
Uttarkashi	None	Krishna Singh	Indian National Congress
Tehri	None	Trepan Singh	Indian National Congress
Deoprayag	None	Vinaya Laxmi	Indian National Congress
Ganga Salan	None	Jagmohan Singh Negi	Indian National Congress
Lansdowne	None	Mukandi Lal	Independent
Pauri	None	Chandra Singh	Indian National Congress
Kedarnath	None	Gangadhar	Praja Socialist Party
Badrinath	None	Yogeshwar Prasad Khanduri	Indian National Congress
Pithoragarh	None	Narendra Singh Bisht	Indian National Congress
Champawat	SC	Khushi Ram	Indian National Congress
Danpur	None	Mohan Singh	Indian National Congress
Almora	None	Ganga Singh	Indian National Congress
Ranikhet North	None	Hari Datt	Indian National Congress
Ranikhet South	None	Chandra Bhanu Gupta	Indian National Congress
Naini Tal	None	Devendra Singh	Indian National Congress
Tanakpur	None	Anisur Rahman	Indian National Congress
Kashipur	None	Debi Datt	Indian National Congress
Afzalgarh	None	Basant Singh	Bharatiya Jana Sangh
Najibabad	None	Shri Ram	Bharatiya Jana Sangh
Bijnor	None	Satya Vir	Indian National Congress
Chandpur	None	Nardeo Singh	Independent
Nagina	None	Govind Sahay	Indian National Congress
Dhampur	None	Khub Singh	Indian National Congress
Boodpur	SC	Girdhari Lal	Indian National Congress
Kanth	None	Daudayal Khanna	Indian National Congress
Amroha	None	Sharafat Husain Rizvi	Communist Party of India
Hasanpur North	None	Jagdish Prasad	Indian National Congress
Hasanpur South	SC	Sukhan Lal	Indian National Congress
Sambhal	None	Mahmood Hasan Khan	Republican Party of India
Bahjoi	None	Bishan Lal	Praja Socialist Party
Chandausi	None	Narendra Singh	Independent
Bilari	SC	Het Ram	Praja Socialist Party
Moradabad City	None	Halimuddin	Republican Party of India
Moradabad Rural	None	Riasat Husain	Praja Socialist Party
Thakurdwara	None	Ram Pal Singh	Indian National Congress
Suar Tanda	None	Mahmood Ali Khan	Indian National Congress
Rampur City	None	Kishwar Ara Begum	Indian National Congress
Rampur Rural	None	Kalyan Rai	Indian National Congress
Shahabad	SC	Baldeo Singh Arya	Indian National Congress
Bisauli	None	Shive Raj Singh	Indian National Congress
Kot	SC	Kesho Ram	Indian National Congress
Islamnagar	None	Surajpal Singh	Indian National Congress
Gunnaur	None	Jugal Kishore	Praja Socialist Party
Sahaswan	None	Ulfat Singh	Bharatiya Jana Sangh
Ujhani	None	Purushotam Lal Badhwar (rajaji)	Republican Party of India
Usehat	None	Nirottam Singh	Independent
Dataganj	None	Narain Singh	Bharatiya Jana Sangh
Budaun	None	Rukum Singh	Indian National Congress
Aonla	None	Nawal Kishore	Indian National Congress
Sirauli	None	Vaidya Dharam Dutt	Indian National Congress
Baheri	None	Ram Moorti	Indian National Congress
Bhojipura	None	Harish Kumar Gangwar	Bharatiya Jana Sangh
Bareilly City	None	Jagdish Saran Agarwal	Indian National Congress
Bareilly Cantonment	None	Mohammad Hussain	Indian National Congress
Sanha	None	Rameshwar Nath Alias Choubey	Independent
Faridpur	SC	Hem Raj	Bharatiya Jana Sangh
Nawabganj	None	Naurang Lal	Indian National Congress
Pilibhit	None	Ram Roop Singh	Indian National Congress
Puranpur	None	Mohan Lal Acharya	Indian National Congress
Bisalpur	SC	Durga Prasad	Indian National Congress
Tilhar	None	Bhagwan Sahai	Independent
Khera Bajhera	None	Surendra Vikram	Indian National Congress
Jalalabad	None	Kesho Singh	Indian National Congress
Jamuar	None	Ram Murti Anchal	Indian National Congress
Shahjahanpur	None	Rafi Khan	Indian National Congress
Powayan	None	Raja Vikaram Shah	Independent
Khutar	SC	Kandhai Lal	Independent
Nighasan	None	Ram Charan Shah	Bharatiya Jana Sangh
Dhaurehra	None	Tej Narain	Indian National Congress
Kheri	None	Bankata Singh Alias Tunnu Singh	Indian National Congress
Srinagar	None	Banshidhar Misra	Indian National Congress
Palia	SC	Chheda Lal Chudhri	Indian National Congress
Haiderabad	None	Ram Bhajan	Indian National Congress
Mohamdi	SC	Manna Lal	Bharatiya Jana Sangh
Misrikh	None	Awadhesh Kumar	Socialist Party
Sitapur	None	Sharda Nand	Bharatiya Jana Sangh
Laharpur	None	Bipin Behari Tewari	Bharatiya Jana Sangh
Tambaur	SC	Ganeshi Lal	Indian National Congress
Biswan	None	Gaya Prasad	Bharatiya Jana Sangh
Mahmudabad	None	Shivendra Pratap	Bharatiya Jana Sangh
Bari	SC	Baiju Ram	Indian National Congress
Khairabad	None	Tambreshwari Prasad	Bharatiya Jana Sangh
Machhrehta	SC	Dalla Ram	Indian National Congress
Gondwa	None	Mohan Lal	Indian National Congress
Sandila	SC	Pancham	Independent
Mallawan	None	J. P. Mishra	Indian National Congress
Bilgram	None	Kalarani	Indian National Congress
Hardoi	None	Mahesh Singh	Indian National Congress
Gopamau	SC	Parmai	Bharatiya Jana Sangh
Shahabad	None	Piarey Lal	Bharatiya Jana Sangh
Shiroman Nagar	SC	Pooran Lal	Bharatiya Jana Sangh
Pali	None	Bhakt Singh Sarda	Bharatiya Jana Sangh
Bangarmau	SC	Sewa Ram	Indian National Congress
Safipur	None	Gopi Nath	Indian National Congress
Unnao	None	Ziaur Rehman Alias Wakkan	Indian National Congress
Bhagwant Nagar	None	Dev Datt	Indian National Congress
Purwa	None	Ram Adhin Singh	Indian National Congress
Jhalotar Ajgain	None	Sri Ram	Indian National Congress
Hasanganj	SC	Bhikkha Lal	Communist Party of India
Malihabad	None	Ram Pal Trivedi	Indian National Congress
Mahona	SC	Sukh Lal	Bharatiya Jana Sangh
Lucknow City East	None	Kishori Lal Agarwal	Indian National Congress
Lucknow City Central	None	Mahabir Prasad Srivastava	Indian National Congress
Lucknow City West	None	Syed Ali Zaheer	Indian National Congress
Lucknow Cantonment	None	Balak Ram Vaish	Indian National Congress
Nigohan	None	Vijai Kumar	Indian National Congress
Mohanlalganj	SC	Ram Shanker Ravivasi	Indian National Congress
Bachhrawan	SC	Bhagwan Din (village Jamurwan)	Socialist Party
Inhauna	None	Pashupatinath Saran Singh	Independent
Rae Bareli North	None	Krishna Pal Singh (raja Sudauli)	Bharatiya Jana Sangh
Sareni	None	Gudptar Singh	Indian National Congress
Dalmau	None	Mahavir Prasad	Indian National Congress
Rae Bareli South	None	Rati Pal	Socialist Party
Rokha	None	Narendra Bahadur Singh	Bharatiya Jana Sangh
Salon	SC	Pitai	Socialist Party
Kunda	None	Niaz Hasan Khan	Indian National Congress
Dhingwas	SC	Ram Swaroop	Indian National Congress
Pratapgarh South	None	Babu Lal	Bharatiya Jana Sangh
Birapur	None	Shyam Sunder	Indian National Congress
Patti	SC	Ram Kinkar	Indian National Congress
Konhdaur	None	Onkar Nath	Bharatiya Jana Sangh
Pratapgarh North	None	Balendra Bhusan Pratap Singh	Bharatiya Jana Sangh
Atheha	None	Kunwar Tej Bhan Singh	Socialist Party
Amethi	None	Vaidya Baij Nath Singh	Indian National Congress
Gaura Jamo	None	Kunwar Rudra Pratap Singh	Independent
Jagdishpur	SC	Indra Pal	Indian National Congress
Issauli	None	Ram Bali	Indian National Congress
Baraunsa	None	Rama Kant Singh	Indian National Congress
Sultanpur	None	Abdul Sami	Indian National Congress
Lambhua	None	Uma Dutta	Indian National Congress
Kadipur	None	Shripat Misra	Indian National Congress
Aldemau	SC	Shanker Lal	Indian National Congress
Minjhaura	None	Mahadeo	Independent
Akbarpur	SC	Ram Rati	Indian National Congress
Surhurpur	None	Jagdamba Prasad	Independent
Birhar	SC	Sukhramdas	Indian National Congress
Tanda	None	Jai Ram Varma	Indian National Congress
Amsin	None	Raja Ram	Indian National Congress
Faizabad	None	Madan Mohan	Indian National Congress
Bikapur	None	Akhand Pratap Singh	Indian National Congress
Pachhimrath	None	Hari Nath Tewari	Bharatiya Jana Sangh
Mangalsi	SC	Dhoom Prasad	Bharatiya Jana Sangh
Rudauli	None	Mukut Behari Lal	Bharatiya Jana Sangh
Haidergarh	None	Ram Kishore	Independent
Siddhaur	SC	Ghan Shyam Dass	Indian National Congress
Daryabad	None	Duijendra Narain	Bharatiya Jana Sangh
Satrikh	SC	Mendi Lal	Socialist Party
Nawabganj	None	Jamilur Rahman	Indian National Congress
Kursi	SC	Nattha Ram	Socialist Party
Bhitauli	None	Ram Asrey	Socialist Party
Kaisarganj	None	Hukam Singh Visen	Indian National Congress
Fakharpur	None	Abdul Haseeb Khan	Swatantra Party
Mahsi	SC	Ram Adhar Kannaujia	Swatantra Party
Nanpara	None	Basant Lal Sharma	Indian National Congress
Charda	None	Prem Singh	Swatantra Party
Bahraich North	None	Jadish Prasad	Indian National Congress
Bahraich South	None	Daljit Singh	Indian National Congress
Ikauna	SC	Mangol	Swatantra Party
Bhinga	None	Mannu Singh	Swatantra Party
Tulsipur	None	Bdaldeo Singh	Bharatiya Jana Sangh
Balrampur North	SC	Sukhdeo Prasad	Bharatiya Jana Sangh
Balrampur South	None	Babban Singh	Indian National Congress
Utraula	None	Suraj Lal	Bharatiya Jana Sangh
Sadullah Nagar	None	Avadh Narain Singh	Bharatiya Jana Sangh
Mankapur	None	Raghvendra Pratap Singh	Swatantra Party
Gonda East	None	Ishwar Saran	Indian National Congress
Gonda North	None	Navrang Singh	Swatantra Party
Gonda West	SC	Ganga Prasad	Indian National Congress
Paharapur	None	Santi Chand	Indian National Congress
Sarju	None	Girja Prasad	Socialist Party
Tarabganj	None	Sital Prasad	Indian National Congress
Mahadeva	None	Vishnu Pratap Singh	Indian National Congress
Harraiya West	None	Ran Bahadur Singh	Indian National Congress
Harraiya East	None	Ram Lakhan Singh	Indian National Congress
Nagar	None	Shakuntala Nayar	Bharatiya Jana Sangh
Basti	None	Rajendra Kishori	Indian National Congress
Domariaganj South	None	Kazi Jalil Abbasi	Indian National Congress
Domariaganj North	None	Bhanu Pratap Singh	Swatantra Party
Bansi West	None	Ram Kumar	Indian National Congress
Banganga West	None	Madho Prasad Tripathi	Bharatiya Jana Sangh
Banganga East	None	Chandra Pal	Bharatiya Jana Sangh
Naugarh	None	Jagdish	Bharatiya Jana Sangh
Bansi North	None	Tameshwar Prasad	Indian National Congress
Bansi South	SC	Sohan Lal Dhusia	Indian National Congress
Mendhwal	None	Sucheta Kripalani	Indian National Congress
Khalilabad	SC	Genda Devi	Indian National Congress
Mahuli West	SC	Shyam Lal	Swatantra Party
Mahuli East	None	Kashi Nath Bahadur	Swatantra Party
Bansgaon	None	Ganesh Prasad	Indian National Congress
Dhuriapar	SC	Yasoda Devi	Indian National Congress
Chillupar	None	Kalpanath Singh	Praja Socialist Party
Bhawapar	None	Ram Lakhan Shukla	Indian National Congress
Jhangha	SC	Ram Surat	Indian National Congress
Pipraich	None	Achhaiber Singh	Indian National Congress
Gorakhpur	None	Niamatullah Ansari	Indian National Congress
Maniram	None	Avadyanath	Hindu Mahasabha
Maghar	None	Keshbhan	Indian National Congress
Pharenda West	None	Narsingh Narain	Socialist Party
Pharenda East	None	Dwarka Prasad Pande	Indian National Congress
Shyam Deurwa	None	Ashtbhuja	Indian National Congress
Maharajganj	SC	Duryodhan	Socialist Party
Binaikpur	None	Ram Avadh	Indian National Congress
Tilpur	None	Yadvendra Singh Urf Lallan Ji	Indian National Congress
Sidhuwa Jobna	SC	Sheo Prasad	Indian National Congress
Ramkola	None	Rajdeo	Indian National Congress
Hata	None	Bankelal	Praja Socialist Party
Padrauna West	None	Mangal	Indian National Congress
Padrauna North	None	Chanderdeo	Indian National Congress
Padrauna East	None	Genda Singh	Praja Socialist Party
Padrauna South	None	Ramayan	Praja Socialist Party
Deoria North	None	Ram Lal	Indian National Congress
Deoria South	None	Kisuna	Socialist Party
Gauribazar	SC	Sita Ram	Indian National Congress
Rudrapur	None	Chandrabali	Socialist Party
Salempur West	None	Ugrasen	Socialist Party
Salempur East	None	Kailas	Praja Socialist Party
Salempur South	None	Raja Awadhesh Pratap	Praja Socialist Party
Natthupur	None	Ram Sunder	Praja Socialist Party
Ghosi	None	Jharkhande Rai	Communist Party of India
Sagri	None	Indrasan	Indian National Congress
Gopalpur	None	Uma Shanker	Praja Socialist Party
Atraulia	None	Brij Behari	Indian National Congress
Nizamabad	None	Amjad Ali	Indian National Congress
Azamgarh	None	Bhima Prasad	Praja Socialist Party
Saraimir	SC	Mangaldeo	Praja Socialist Party
Mahul	None	Daulat Lal	Praja Socialist Party
Deogaon	None	Satyadeo	Praja Socialist Party
Bela Daultabad	SC	Chhangur	Communist Party of India
Mubarakpur	SC	Surjan	Communist Party of India
Mohammadabad Gohna	None	Chandrajit	Communist Party of India
Kopaganj	None	Z. A. Ahmad	Communist Party of India
Rasra	SC	Raghunath	Communist Party of India
Siar	None	Ganga Prasad Singh	Indian National Congress
Sikandarpur	None	Jagarnath	Indian National Congress
Bansdih West	None	Sheo Mangal	Indian National Congress
Bansdih East	None	Kashi Nath	Socialist Party
Duab	None	Manager	Praja Socialist Party
Ballia	None	Ram Anat Pandeya	Indian National Congress
Kopachit	None	Mandhata Singh	Indian National Congress
Zahurabad	SC	Raghubir	Communist Party of India
Mohammadabad	None	Vijay Shankar Singh	Indian National Congress
Zamania	None	Vashishta Narain Sharma	Indian National Congress
Ghazipur	None	Krishna Nand Rai	Indian National Congress
Karanda	None	Ram Sunder Shashtri	Communist Party of India
Pachotar	SC	Jhilmit Jhilloo	Communist Party of India
Shadiabad	None	Raj Nath	Indian National Congress
Saidpur	None	Kamla Singh Yadav	Praja Socialist Party
Kerakat	SC	Ram Samjhawan	Indian National Congress
Beyalsi	None	Lal Bahadur	Indian National Congress
Jaunpur	None	Yadvendra Dutt	Bharatiya Jana Sangh
Rari	None	Kunwar Sripal	Bharatiya Jana Sangh
Shahganj	None	Lakshmi Shankar Yadav	Indian National Congress
Chanda	SC	Mata Prasad	Indian National Congress
Garwara	None	Bhagwati Din	Indian National Congress
Machhlishahr	None	Kesari Prasad	Praja Socialist Party
Mariahu	None	Jagarnath	Bharatiya Jana Sangh
Barsathi	None	Ramesh Chandra Sharma	Indian National Congress
Bhadohi	None	Banshidhar Pandey	Indian National Congress
Gyanpur	SC	Harigain Ram	Indian National Congress
Kaswar	None	Gaya Prasad	Socialist Party
Kolaslah	None	Udal	Communist Party of India
Gangapur	None	Rishi Narain Shashtri	Indian National Congress
Varanasi City South	None	Girdhari Lal	Indian National Congress
Varanasi City North	None	Vishwanath Prasad	Bharatiya Jana Sangh
Sheopur	None	Lal Bahadur Singh	Indian National Congress
Katehar	None	Raghunath Singh	Socialist Party
Mahaich	None	Raj Narain	Indian National Congress
Moghal Sarai	None	Uma Shanker	Socialist Party
Chandauli	None	Kamlapati Tripathi	Indian National Congress
Chakia	SC	Ram Lakhan	Indian National Congress
Dudhi	SC	Ram Pyare	Indian National Congress
Robertsganj	None	Ram Nath Pathak	Indian National Congress
Ahraura	None	Vishwanath	Indian National Congress
Chunar	None	Raj Narain	Indian National Congress
Mirzapur	None	Bhagwan Das	Bharatiya Jana Sangh
Kantit North	None	Aziz Imam	Indian National Congress
Kantit South	SC	Bechan Ram	Indian National Congress
Meja	None	Salig Ram Jaiswal	Praja Socialist Party
Bara	SC	Raghunath Prasad	Indian National Congress
Karchana	None	Satya Narain Pande	Praja Socialist Party
Kewai	None	Vaij Nath Pande	Indian National Congress
Jhusi	SC	Banshi Lal	Praja Socialist Party
Phulpur	None	Muzaffar Hasan	Indian National Congress
Soraon East	None	Sheo Murti	Indian National Congress
Saraon West	None	Mewa Lal	Praja Socialist Party
Allahabad City North	None	Rajendra Kumari Bajpayee	Indian National Congress
Allahabad City South	None	Kalyan Chand Mohiley Alias Chhunnan Guru	Praja Socialist Party
Chail	None	Naunihal Singh Chaudhari	Praja Socialist Party
Bharwari	SC	Gokul Prasad	Independent
Karari	SC	Nathu Ram	Bharatiya Jana Sangh
Sirathu	None	Hemwati Nandan Bahuguna	Indian National Congress
Khaga	None	Raksha Pal Singh	Bharatiya Jana Sangh
Fatehpur	SC	Badri Prasad	Indian National Congress
Bindki	None	Jagannath Singh	Indian National Congress
Tappajar	None	Ram Kishore	Independent
Haswa	SC	Raghubir Sahai	Independent
Kishanpur	None	Deep Narian Singh	Independent
Manikpur	SC	Sia Dulari	Indian National Congress
Karwi	None	Din Dayal	Indian National Congress
Baberu	None	Deshraj	Independent
Naraini	None	Matola Singh	Bharatiya Jana Sangh
Banda	None	Brij Mohan Lal Gupta	Indian National Congress
Mahoba	None	Madanpal Singh	Praja Socialist Party
Maudaha	None	Brijraj Singh	Indian National Congress
Hamirpur	None	Surendra Dutta Bajpai	Indian National Congress
Rath	None	Doongar Singh	Indian National Congress
Charkhari	SC	Mohan Lal Ahirwar	Indian National Congress
Mahroni	None	Krishna Chandra	Indian National Congress
Lalitpur	SC	Ayodhya Prasad	Indian National Congress
Jhansi	None	Lakhpat Ram Sharma	Independent
Moth	None	Sudama Prasad Goswami	Indian National Congress
Mau	SC	Beni Bai	Indian National Congress
Garotha	None	Kashi Prasad Dwedi	Indian National Congress
Konch	None	Vijai Singh	Swatantra Party
Jalaun	None	Chaturbhuj Sharma	Indian National Congress
Umri	SC	Basant Lal	Indian National Congress
Kalpi	None	Shiva Sampati Sharma	Indian National Congress
Bhognipur	None	Raj Narain Misra	Indian National Congress
Ghatampur West	SC	Jwala Prasad	Indian National Congress
Ghatampur East	None	Sheo Nath Singh	Socialist Party
Kanpur City I	None	Tara Agarwal	Indian National Congress
Kanpur City Ii	None	Sant Singh Yusuf	Communist Party of India
Kanpur City Iii	None	Hamid Khan	Indian National Congress
Kanpur City Iv	None	S. G. Datta	Indian National Congress
Kanpur City V	None	Sushila Rohatgi	Indian National Congress
Kanpur Rural	None	Shashi Bhushan Singh	Praja Socialist Party
Bithoor	None	Brij Rani	Indian National Congress
Bilhaur	SC	Murlidhar Kureel	Indian National Congress
Akbarpur	None	Balwan Singh	Praja Socialist Party
Derapur	None	Nitya Nand Pandey	Indian National Congress
Auraiya	None	Badri Prasad	Indian National Congress
Ajitmal	SC	Sukh Lal	Indian National Congress
Lahkana	SC	Ghasi Ram	Indian National Congress
Etawah	None	Hoti Lal Agarwal	Indian National Congress
Jaswant Nagar	None	Natthu Singh	Praja Socialist Party
Bharthana	None	Sahdeo Singh	Praja Socialist Party
Bidhuna	None	Vijai Shanker	Indian National Congress
Saurikh	None	Hori Lal Yadav	Praja Socialist Party
Kannauj	SC	Pati Ram	Indian National Congress
Chhibramau	None	Kotwal Singh Bhadauria	Praja Socialist Party
Bhojpur	None	Mahram Singh	Indian National Congress
Farrukhabad	None	Daya Ram	Bharatiya Jana Sangh
Shamsabad	None	Rajendra Singh Yadav	Praja Socialist Party
Kaimganj	None	Sia Ram	Praja Socialist Party
Bhongaon	None	Subedar Singh	Indian National Congress
Kishni	None	Ganesh Chand	Indian National Congress
Karhal	SC	Ram Singh	Swatantra Party
Mainpuri	None	Brijeshwar Sahai	Indian National Congress
Ghiror	None	Madho Narain	Indian National Congress
Shikohabad	None	Mansa Ram	Independent
Jasrana	None	Balbir Singh	Swatantra Party
Etah	None	Ganga Prasad	Hindu Mahasabha
Sirhpura	None	Chhotey Lal Paliwal	Indian National Congress
Aliganj	None	Lokpal Singh	Bharatiya Jana Sangh
Nidhpur	None	Rajendra Singh	Bharatiya Jana Sangh
Sahawar	None	Bed Ram	Bharatiya Jana Sangh
Kasganj	None	Girwar Prasad	Bharatiya Jana Sangh
Marehra	None	Raghubir Singh	Praja Socialist Party
Jalesar	SC	Chiranji Lal	Swatantra Party
Etmadpur South	None	Multan Singh	Socialist Party
Etmadpur North	SC	Sheo Charan	Socialist Party
Firozabad	None	Bhagwan Das	Republican Party of India
Bah	None	Vidyawati	Indian National Congress
Fatehabad	None	Banwari Lal Pipra	Republican Party of India
Kheragarh	None	Jagan Prasad	Indian National Congress
Agra City I	None	Baloji Agrawal	Independent
Agra City I I	None	Khem Chand	Republican Party of India
Agra Rural	SC	Chatra Pati Ambesh	Indian National Congress
Fatehpur Sikri	None	Champa Wati	Indian National Congress
Mathura	None	Kedar Nath	Indian National Congress
Goverdhan	None	Acharya Jugal Kishore	Indian National Congress
Chhata	None	Lakhi Singh	Socialist Party
Mat	None	Radhey Shyam	Socialist Party
Gokul	SC	Kanhaiya Lal	Indian National Congress
Sadabad	None	Ashraf Ali Khan	Indian National Congress
Hathras	None	Nand Kumar Deo Vashistha	Indian National Congress
Sasni	SC	Ram Prasad Deshmukh	Indian National Congress
Sikandra Rao	None	Nek Ram Sharma	Independent
Gangiri	None	Sri Niwas	Indian National Congress
Atrauli	None	Babu Singh	Socialist Party
Aligarh	None	Abdul Basir Khan	Republican Party of India
Koil	SC	Bhoop Singh	Republican Party of India
Iglas	None	Sheodan Singh	Independent
Khair	None	Chetanya Raj Singh	Swatantra Party
Tappal	None	Mahendra Singh	Independent
Jewar	SC	Jasram Singh	Indian National Congress
Khurja	None	Mahabir Singh	Indian National Congress
Chhatari	SC	Dharam Singh	Indian National Congress
Debai	None	Himmat Singh	Bharatiya Jana Sangh
Anupshahr	None	Chunni Lal	Indian National Congress
Siana	None	Mumtaz Mhd. Khan	Praja Socialist Party
Agota	None	Jagbir Singh	Indian National Congress
Bulandshahr	None	Irrtiza Husain	Indian National Congress
Sikandrabad	None	Bansari Dass	Indian National Congress
Dadri	None	Ramchandar Vikal	Indian National Congress
Ghaziabad	None	Tej Singh	Indian National Congress
Modinagar	None	Vichitra Narain Sharma	Indian National Congress
Dasna	None	Meghnath Singh Shishodia	Independent
Hapur	None	Prem Sunder	Independent
Garh Mukteshwar	SC	Vir Sen	Indian National Congress
Kithore	None	Shraddha Devi	Indian National Congress
Hastinapur	None	Pitam Singh Of Pirnagar	Indian National Congress
Meerut City	None	Jagdish Saran Rastogi	Indian National Congress
Meerut Cantonment	None	Prakashwati Sood	Indian National Congress
Meerut Rural	SC	Hari Singh	Indian National Congress
Baghpat	None	Shaukat Hameed Khan	Indian National Congress
Kotana	None	Charan Singh	Indian National Congress
Baraut	None	Mool Chand Shastri	Indian National Congress
Barnawa	None	Jamadar Singh	Independent
Sardhana	SC	Ramji Lal Sahayak	Indian National Congress
Budhana	None	Vijai Pal Singh	Communist Party of India
Shikarpur	None	Sugan Chand	Indian National Congress
Jansath	None	Ahmad Baksh	Indian National Congress
Bhokerheri	SC	Shugan Chand Mazdoor	Indian National Congress
Baghara	SC	Nain Singh	Praja Socialist Party
Muzaffarnagar	None	Keshava Gupt	Indian National Congress
Kairana	None	Chandan Singh	Independent
Bhawan	None	Ram Chandra Singh	Indian National Congress
Nakur	None	Yashpal	Indian National Congress
Sarsawa	SC	Shakuntala Devi	Indian National Congress
Muzaffarabad	None	Sardar Singh	Independent
Saharanpur	None	Brahm Dutt Mayor	Independent
Harora	None	Jai Gopal	Indian National Congress
Nagal	SC	Ram Singh	Indian National Congress
Deoband	None	Phool Singh	Indian National Congress
Jwalapur	None	Sayeed Ahmad	Indian National Congress
Roorkee	None	Jagdish Narain Sinha	Indian National Congress
Hardwar	None	Shanti Prapan Sharma	Indian National Congress
Dehra Dun	None	Brij Bhushan Saran	Indian National Congress
Mussoorie	None	Gulab Singh	Indian National Congress
