= Mohammed Faeem =

Indian politician

Mohammad Faheem Irfan is an Indian politician and member of Samajwadi Party. He represented the Bilari constituency of Uttar Pradesh. He is member of the 18th Uttar Pradesh Assembly. Previously, he was member of 17th Uttar Pradesh Assembly and 16th Uttar Pradesh Assembly. Haji Mohammad Irfan (his father) was MLA from Bilari (Moradabad); he was member of the 16th Uttar Pradesh Assembly.

His father, Mohammad Irfan, was also politician.
