= Zia ur Rahman Barq =

Indian politician

Zia Ur Rahman Barq

Member of Parliament, Lok Sabha
- Incumbent
- Assumed office 4 June 2024
- Preceded by: Shafiqur Rahman Barq
- Constituency: Sambhal

Member of the Uttar Pradesh Legislative Assembly
- In office 10 March 2022 – June 2024
- Preceded by: Mohammad Rizwan
- Succeeded by: Thakur Ramveer Singh
- Constituency: Kundarki

Personal details
- Born: 3 July 1988 (age 38) Sambhal, Uttar Pradesh, India
- Party: Samajwadi Party
- Spouse: Tuba Hafeez
- Relations: Shafiqur Rahman Barq (grandfather)
- Children: 1
- Education: Bachelor of Laws; Bachelor of Arts
- Alma mater: Chaudhary Charan Singh University (Meerut); Aligarh Muslim University

Zia ur Rahman Barq (Hindi pronunciation: [zɪjaː ʊɾ ɾɛɦ.maːn̪ bəɾk]) is an Indian politician and Member of the 18th Uttar Pradesh Assembly since 10 March 2022 to 4 June 2024 from Kundarki constituency and Member of Parliament since 7 June 2024 from Sambhal as Samajwadi Party candidate.

== Early life ==
Zia ur Rahman Barq is the son of Mamluk Ur Rahman Barq and the grandson of Shafiqur Rahman Barq, who was the former Member of Parliament from Sambhal.

== Political career ==
In his student life, he was a Senior Cabinet Member & Acting Secretary of the Aligarh Muslim University Students' Union (AMUSU) in 2005-06.

Before 2017 Uttar Pradesh Legislative Assembly election, he was the member of All India Majlis-e-Ittehadul Muslimeen.

== Controversies ==
A complaint was filed over Ziaur for breaking the election rules. Zia Ur Rahman Barq raised the demand to start Islamic studies in BHU after the controversies in AMU to teach Sanatan Dharma.

In November 2024 a conflict erupted in Sambhal after a court ordered an inspection of Shahi Jama Masjid, Sambhal, Which led to violence between police administration and civilians on 24 November. Police registered a criminal offence against Zia Ur for allegedly instigating the violence.
