= Rajaudha =

Village in Madhya Pradesh, India

Rajaudha Rajodha
- Location within Madhya Pradesh Location within India
- Coordinates: 26°42′25″N 78°25′21″E
- Country: India
- State: Madhya Pradesh
- District: Morena
- Tehsil: Porsa

Government
  - Type: Gram Panchayat

Area
  - Total: 33.75 km^{2} (13.03 sq mi)
- Elevation: 156 m (512 ft)

Population (2011)
  - Total: 16,524
  - Density: 489.6/km^{2} (1,268/sq mi)

Languages
  - Official: Hindi
  - Other: English
- Time zone: UTC+5:30 (IST)
- PIN: 476115
- Telephone code: 07538
- Vehicle registration: MP-06

Rajaudha, also spelled as Rajodha, is a village in Porsa Tehsil, Morena District, Madhya Pradesh, India. It is located near the state border with Uttar Pradesh, about 49 kilometres northeast of the district capital Morena, and 6 kilometres northeast of the tehsil capital Porsa. As of the year 2011, it has a population of 16,524.

== Geography ==
Rajaudha is situated south of the Chambal River. The National Highway 552 passes through it. The average elevation of the village is 156 metres above the sea level.

== Demographics ==
According to the 2011 Census of India, Rajaudha has a total of 2,921 households. Out of the 16,524 inhabitants, 8,744 are male and 7,780 are female. The overall literacy rate is 67.56%, with 6,641 of the male population and 4,523 of the female population being literate. The census location code for Rajaudha is 452065.
