= Subedar Singh Rajodha =

Indian politician

Member of the Madhya Pradesh Legislative Assembly
- In office 28 December 2020 – 2023
- Preceded by: Banavareelal Sharma
- Succeeded by: Pankaj Upadhyay
- Constituency: Joura

Personal details
- Born: 21 August 1953 (age 72) Rajodha, Madhya Pradesh, India
- Party: Bharatiya Janata Party
- Spouse: Sheela Devi
- Children: 3
- Parent: Late. Uday Singh (father)
- Education: B. A.
- Profession: Agriculturist
- Source

Subedar Singh Rajodha is an Indian politician and member of the Bharatiya Janata Party. Rajodha is a member of the Madhya Pradesh Legislative Assembly from the Joura constituency in Morena district.
