= Jhundpura =

Jhundpura jhandu Rawat
- Town
- Location in Madhya Pradesh, India Jhundpura (India)
- Coordinates: 26°20′24″N 77°32′24″E
- Country: India
- State: Madhya Pradesh
- District: Morena
- Founder: jhandu Rawat

Government
  - Type: democratic
  - Body: municipalities

Area
  - Total: 25 km^{2} (9.7 sq mi)
- Elevation: 177 m (581 ft)

Population (2001)
  - Total: 8,110
  - Density: 324/km^{2} (840/sq mi)

Languages
  - Official: Hindi
- Time zone: UTC+5:30 (IST)
- ISO 3166 code: IN-MP
- Vehicle registration: MP

Jhundpura is a town and a nagar panchayat in Morena district, in the Chambal Division, in the Indian state of Madhya Pradesh.

== Demographics ==
As of 2001 India census, Jhundpura had a population of 8,110. Males constitute 55% of the population and females 45%. Jhundpura has an average literacy rate of 49%, lower than the national average of 59.5%: male literacy is 62%, and female literacy is 32%. In Jhundpura, 19% of the population is under 6 years of age.
