= Rajesh Dandotiya =

Indian police officer

ADCP Rajesh Dandotiya
- Born: June 13, 1975 (age 51); Morena district, Madhya Pradesh
- Occupations: Police Officer, Author
- Notable work: Cyber Crime Prevention and Fraud Management; Inside the Cyber Crime Files and Cyber Protector; Cyber Rakshak (Hindi)
- Website: rajeshdandotiya.com

Rajesh Dandotiya (born 13 June 1975) is an Indian Author and Indian Police Service officer serving as the Additional Deputy Commissioner of Police (ADCP), Crime Branch, Indore, Madhya Pradesh. He is known for supervising investigations into cyber fraud, "digital arrest" scams, online betting and financial crime cases, and for conducting large-scale public awareness campaigns on cyber security.

== Early life ==
Rajesh Dandotiya was born on 13 June 1975 in Morena district of Madhya Pradesh.

== Career ==
Dandotiya serves in the Madhya Pradesh Police as Additional DCP, Crime Branch, in the Indore Police Commissionerate. he has served as supervising officer in a series of cybercrime, financial fraud and organised-crime cases reported in regional and national media.

He received media attention in 2024 when a group of scammers, attempting to run a “digital arrest” fraud, contacted him without realising he was a senior police officer. Reports described how they tried to convince him that a criminal case had been registered in another state and that his bank accounts would be blocked. He kept the call going, recorded the interaction, and eventually switched to a video call in uniform, after which the callers disconnected. The incident was later used by the Indore Police to highlight how such scams typically work.

=== Investigations reported in the media ===
As head of the Indore Crime Branch, Dandotiya has supervised several investigations into scams described as "digital arrest" frauds, in which callers impersonate officials and keep victims under constant surveillance on video calls while coercing them to transfer money.

- In February 2025, the crime branch raided a "dark room" call centre in Delhi that was allegedly being used to conduct digital-arrest frauds targeting senior citizens across India. The operation followed the complaint of a woman from Indore who was reportedly defrauded of ₹46 lakh after being told she was under investigation for terrorism and money-laundering offences. The raid led to the arrest of a 22-year-old suspect and the seizure of devices and data containing information on thousands of pensioners, according to The Times of India.
- In June 2025, he was cited as Additional DCP (Crime) in an investigation involving an 80-year-old retired school principal from Indore who narrowly avoided transferring over ₹1 crore after a similar digital-arrest scam. Bank staff alerted the crime branch when the victim attempted to liquidate her deposits, and Dandotiya’s team intervened, advised her to switch off her phone and later registered a case once the calls resumed."
- In December 2024, he briefed the media about the arrest of a man from Jodhpur, Rajasthan, who allegedly posed as a courier company employee and, along with accomplices impersonating police and Reserve Bank of India officials, defrauded a software engineer of about ₹1.35 lakh. The case was reported as a digital-arrest-style scam, with the crime branch tracing and freezing bank accounts linked to the fraud.
- In November 2025, the Free Press Journal reported that the Indore Crime Branch, acting on a complaint filed via the National Cybercrime Reporting Portal, arrested a fourth accused in an online "task-based" cheating case in which a complainant lost about ₹60 lakh after being lured with initial small profits. Dandotiya stated that the arrested man’s alleged role was to provide multiple bank accounts used for routing the proceeds of the fraud and that more than 40 accounts had been frozen during the investigation.

=== Financial and betting offences ===
Dandotiya has also been mentioned in media coverage of financial crime and betting investigations led by the Indore Crime Branch.

- In June 2025, he told The Times of India that the crime branch had arrested two men from Gujarat in connection with the fraudulent withdrawal of about ₹64.05 lakh from the bank account of an Additional District Judge serving at the Motor Accident Claims Tribunal in Indore. According to the report, the suspects were held after the branch manager of the court campus branch of the State Bank of India lodged a complaint about unauthorised transfers.
- In November 2025, The Times of India reported that two absconding members of an inter-state online betting racket operating through a website named "Varun Online Hub" were arrested by the Indore Crime Branch. The article stated that the branch, led by Additional DCP Rajesh Dandotiya, had earlier arrested ten members of the same network, and that the two newly arrested suspects were responsible for generating virtual user IDs and monitoring online betting operations.

=== Narcotics and arms cases ===
- In June 2025, he informed reporters that the crime branch had arrested an alleged arms smuggler from Barwani district and seized eight country-made pistols, magazines and live cartridges from the suspect’s possession during a raid on Rau–Rajendra Nagar Road on the outskirts of Indore.
- Later that month, The Times of India quoted him as saying that two men from Mandsaur had been arrested by the crime branch with 151 g of MD drugs (MDMA) valued at more than ₹1.5 crore in the international market. According to the report, the arrests followed a tip-off and a police trap laid under an Indore metro bridge.
- In November 2025, he was again cited as Additional DCP (Crime) after the crime branch arrested a man in Indore’s Shivaji Nagar area and recovered 12.60 g of brown sugar, valued at around ₹1.3 lakh internationally. The suspect was reportedly detained during night patrols after allegedly attempting to flee from a police team.

=== Other reported incidents ===
Dandotiya has been mentioned in coverage of other incidents handled by Indore police. For example, in November 2025 The New Indian Express cited him as Additional DCP (Crime) while reporting on a complaint by a national-level shooter who alleged molestation by a bus conductor on a Pune-bound bus transiting through Indore. He told the newspaper that police had facilitated an alternative driver and conductor for the onward journey and were awaiting a written complaint from the athlete.

=== Cyber Inititiatives in Indore ===
- Digital Suraksha Initiative by Rajesh Dandotiya – Cyber Message, Cyber BridgeCyber Spark
- She Safe – for Women’s
- Cyber Youth – College students
- Cyber Vaani – Akashvani program
- Cyber Insights – Panel Discussion with industry leaders.

== Personal life ==
Rajesh Dandotiya married Neeti Dandotiya, a Deputy SP in the Madhya Pradesh Police. The couple have two sons named Samyak and Satyarth.

== Cyber awareness work ==
Dandotiya has been reportedly involved in public outreach on cyber-security. Schools, colleges and local institutions in Indore have hosted sessions conducted by him on topics such as password safety, online impersonation, social-media risks and frauds using video calls. Several regional newspapers and online platforms have described him as one of the officers in Madhya Pradesh who regularly conducts awareness programmes for students and senior citizens.

According to The Wire, he has delivered more than 1,000 cyber security awareness sessions across India, which have been recognised by the World Book of Records, London, for "1000 sessions on cyber awareness as an enforcement officer". Reporting on the launch of an AI-based chatbot for Indore Police in 2025 likewise described him as being known across Madhya Pradesh for conducting over 1,000 cyber awareness campaigns.

== Publications ==
In 2025, he wrote a Hindi-language book titled Cyber Rakshak, published by Mahagatha. The book compiles examples of cyber-crime incidents handled by police and explains common methods used in online frauds in simplified form for general readers. It was launched at the Indore Police Commissioner’s office.

The book compiles over 30 or 35 real-life cybercrime scenarios, including phishing, fake loan apps, sextortion, digital-arrest scams and social-media hacking, and is written for non-technical readers. Reviews and promotional material describe it as aimed at students, homemakers, senior citizens and small business owners, combining checklists and practical tips drawn from his experience in cybercrime investigations and awareness programmes.

== Honours ==
In June 2025, Dandotiya was honoured by the World Book of Records for his cyber-awareness work after completing what was described as his 1,000th cyber awareness session at Daly College in Indore. it was reportedly was presented at a ceremony in Indore attended by state dignitaries.

=== World records ===
1. Maximum number of Cyber awareness sessions by World Book of Records, London.
2. Cyber awareness sessions of mothers by World Book of Records, London.
3. Maximum number of cyber awareness sessions by India Book of Records.
4. Largest Session of Drug Awareness by Golden Book of World Records.
5. Biggest Human Chain by World Book of records, London.
6. Largest E-Shapath by World Book of Records, London.
7. Highest Cyber Awareness session by World Wide Book of Records.
8. Highest Cyber Awareness session by World Record of Excellence, England.
9. Thousand session conducted on cyber awareness Golden Book of World Records.
10. Highest Cyber sessions by International Book of Records.
11. Highest Cyber sessions World Records of India

== See also ==
- Cybercrime in India
