= Joura Assembly constituency =

Constituency of the Madhya Pradesh legislative assembly in India

Coordinates: 26.34°N 77.81°E

Joura
- Constituency No. 4 for the Madhya Pradesh Legislative Assembly

Constituency details
- Country: India
- Region: Central India
- State: Madhya Pradesh
- Division: Chambal Division
- District: Morena
- Lok Sabha constituency: Morena
- Established: 1951
- Reservation: None

Member of Legislative Assembly
- 16th Madhya Pradesh Legislative Assembly
- Incumbent Pankaj Upadhyay
- Party: Indian National Congress
- Elected year: 2023
- Preceded by: Subedar Singh Rajodha

Joura Assembly constituency is one of the 230 Vidhan Sabha (Legislative Assembly) constituencies of Madhya Pradesh state in central India. This constituency came into existence in 1951, as one of the 79 Vidhan Sabha constituencies of the erstwhile Madhya Bharat state.

Joura (constituency number 4) is one of the six Vidhan Sabha constituencies located in Morena district. This constituency covers parts of Joura and Kailaras tehsils of Morena district.

== Members of the Legislative Assembly ==
=== Madhya Bharat Assembly ===
Election	Name	Party
1952	Ram Chandra Mishra	Indian National Congress

=== Madhya Pradesh Assembly ===
Indian National Congress is the most successful political party in Joura Assembly elections.
1. INC (5 terms) (31.2%)
2. BSP (3 terms) (18.8%)
3. BJP (2 terms) (12.5%)
4. Independent (2 terms) (12.5%)
5. JP (1 term) (6.25%)
6. JD (1 term) (6.25%)
7. PSP (1 term) (6.25%)
8. INC (I) (1 term) (6.25%)

Election	Name	Party
1957	Chhetelal Kashiprasad	Independent politician
1962	Pancham Singh	Praja Socialist Party
1967	Ramcharan Lal Mishra	Independent politician
1972	Ramcharan Lal Mishra	Indian National Congress
1977	Subedar Singh	Janata Party
1980	Ramcharan Lal Mishra	Indian National Congress
1985	Mahesh Dutt Mishra	Indian National Congress
1990	Subedar Singh	Janata Dal
1993	Soneram Kushwaha	Bahujan Samaj Party
1998	Soneram Kushwaha	Bahujan Samaj Party
2003	Ummed Singh Bana	Indian National Congress
2008	Maniram Dhakad	Bahujan Samaj Party
2013	Subedar Singh Rajodha	Bharatiya Janata Party
2018	Banwari Lal Sharma	Indian National Congress
2020^	Subedar Singh Rajodha	Bharatiya Janata Party
2023	Pankaj Upadhyay	Indian National Congress

^ bypolls

== Election results ==
=== 2023 ===
2023 Madhya Pradesh Legislative Assembly election: Joura
Party	Candidate	Votes	%	±%
INC	Pankaj Upadhyay	89,253	46.71	▲15.52
BJP	Subedar Singh Rajodha	58,972	30.86	▼8.09
BSP	Soneram Kushwaha	37,038	19.38	▼8.44
AAP	Bhagwati Dhakad Rajodha	1,966	1.03	
NOTA	None of the above	853	0.04	▲0.23
Majority		30,281	15.85	▲8.09
Turnout		191,080	72.57	▲1.67
INC gain from BJP		Swing		

=== 2020 bypolls ===
2020 Madhya Pradesh Legislative Assembly by-elections: Joura
Party	Candidate	Votes	%	±%
BJP	Subedar Singh Rajodha	67,599	38.95	+15.66
INC	Pankaj Upadhyay	54121	31.19	−3.26
BSP	Soneram Kushwaha	48285	27.82	+2.68
NOTA	None of the above	718	0.41	+0.19
Majority		13478	7.76	−1.55
Turnout		173540	70.9	−1.28
BJP gain from INC		Swing		

=== 2018 ===
2018 Madhya Pradesh Legislative Assembly election: Joura
Party	Candidate	Votes	%	±%
INC	Banwari Lal Sharma	56,187	34.45	
BSP	Maniram Dhakad	41,014	25.14	
BJP	Subedar Singh Rajodha	37,988	23.29	
MD	Atar Singh Gurjar	17,167	10.52	
SP	Soneram Kushwaha	2,742	1.68	
NOTA	None of the above	363	0.22	
Majority		15,173	9.31	
Turnout		163,111	72.18	

== See also ==
- Joura
