= Bateshwar Hindu temples, Madhya Pradesh =

Group of sandstone temples in India

Bateshwar Hindu temples
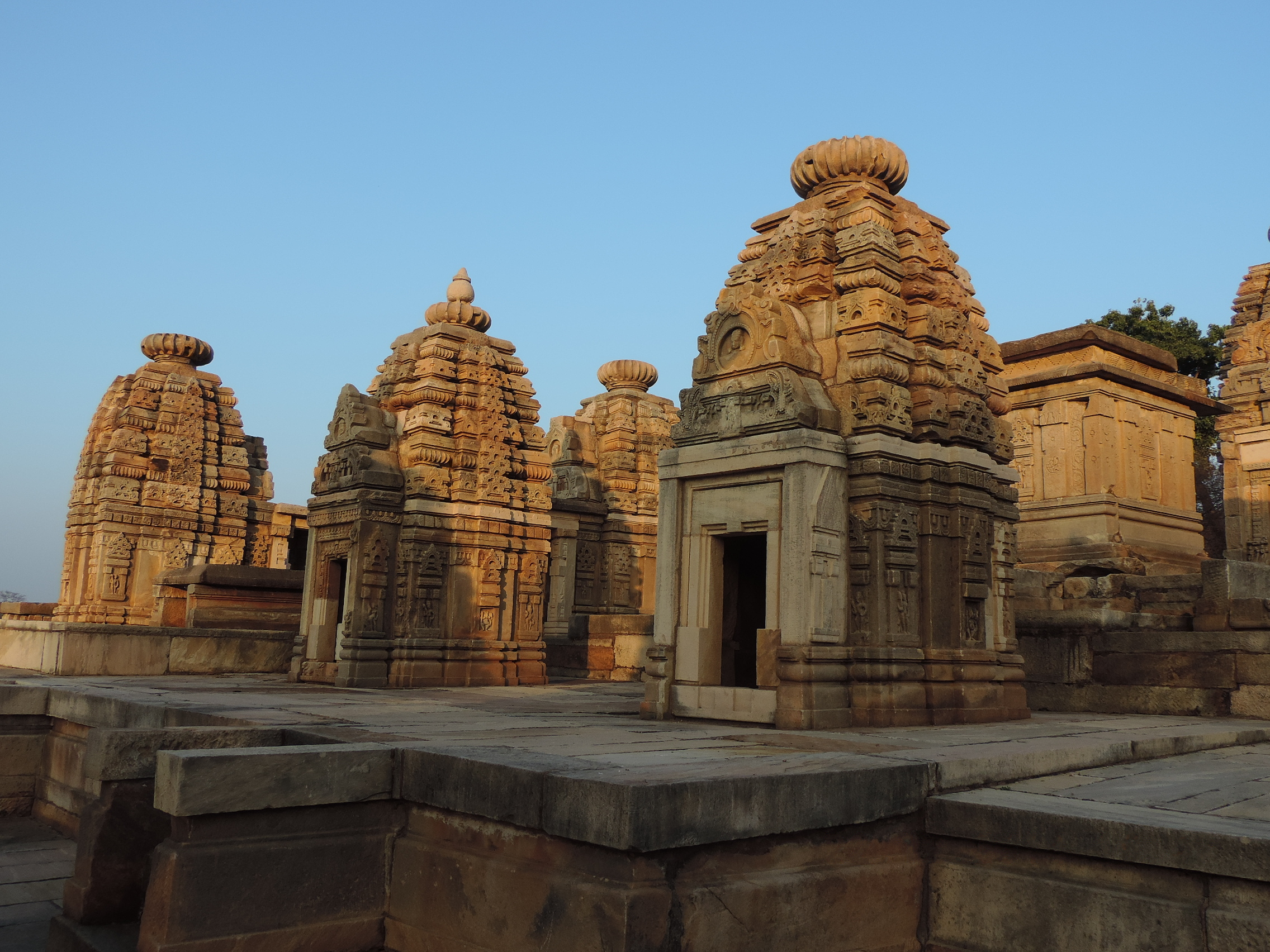
- A few of the 200 Hindu temples in Batesvar

- Location within India Location within Madhya Pradesh

Religion
- Affiliation: Hinduism
- District: Morena district
- Deity: Shiva, Vishnu, Devi, others

Location
- Location: Padavali, Chambal Valley
- State: Madhya Pradesh
- Country: India
- Coordinates: 26°25′37.4″N 78°11′48.6″E

Architecture
- Style: Nagara
- Completed: 8th to 11th-century, during Gurjara-Pratihara Empire

The Bateshwar Hindu temples (romanised: baṭeśvar; /bəʈeːɕvər/) are a group of nearly 200 sandstone Hindu temples and their ruins in north Madhya Pradesh in post-Gupta, early Gurjara-Pratihara style of North Indian temple architecture. It is about 35 kilometres (22 mi) north of Gwalior and about 30 kilometres (19 mi) east of Morena town. The temples are mostly small and spread over about 25 acres (10 ha) site. They are dedicated to Shiva, Vishnu and Shakti – representing the three major traditions within Hinduism. The site is within the Chambal River valley ravines, on the north-western slope of a hill near Padavali known for its major medieval era Vishnu temple. The Bateshwar temples were built between the 8th and the 10th century. The site is likely named after the Bhuteshvar Temple, the largest Shiva temple at the site. It is also referred to as Batesvar temples site or Batesara temples site.

The temples as they now appear are in many cases reconstructed from the fallen stones in a project begun by the Archaeological Survey of India in 2005. Dacoit Nirbhay Singh Gujjar and his gang helped Archaeological Survey of India restore the temple complex.

According to the Madhya Pradesh Directorate of Archaeology, this group of 200 temples were built during the reign of Gurjara-Pratihara Dynasty. According to Michael Meister, an art historian and a professor specializing in Indian temple architecture, the earliest temples in the Bateshwar group near Gwalior are likely from the 750-800 CE period. Cunningham reports that one of the inscriptions was dated Samvat 1107 or 1050 CE.

The temples were destroyed after the 13th century; it is not clear if this was by an earthquake or Muslim forces.

== Description ==
The site is mentioned in historical literature as Dharon or Paravali, later as Padavali. The local name for the group of temples is Batesvar or Bateshwar temples.

According to the Cunningham's report of 1882, the site was a "confused assemblage of more than one hundred temples of various sizes, but mostly small". The largest standing temple was of Shiva, wrote Cunningham, and the temple was locally called Bhutesvara. However, to his surprise the temple had a relief of Garuda on top, leading him to speculate that the temple may have been a Vishnu temple before it was damaged and reused. The Bhutesvara temple had a square sanctum with a 6.75 feet (2.06 m) side, with a relatively small 20 square feet mahamandapa. The sanctum doorway was flanked by river goddesses Ganga and Yamuna. The tower superstructure was a pyramidal square starting off from a 15.33 feet (4.67 m) sided square seated on a flat roof, then rhythmically tapering off.

The standing temples, stated Cunningham, all had sides made from single slabs set upright, above which sat flat roofs then pyramidal top as a part of their architecture. The site had a water tank cut into the hill rock, with rows of small temples arranged to form a street to the tank. Cunningham also reported seeing Shiva linga inside one of the temples, a trimurti statue, a Ganesha, Shiva and Parvati together around this temple. Next to the Shiva temple was a Vishnu temple, about the same size as the Siva temple, again a square sanctum of 6.67 feet (2.03 m) side with river goddesses Ganga and Yamuna flanking the doorway on its jambs.

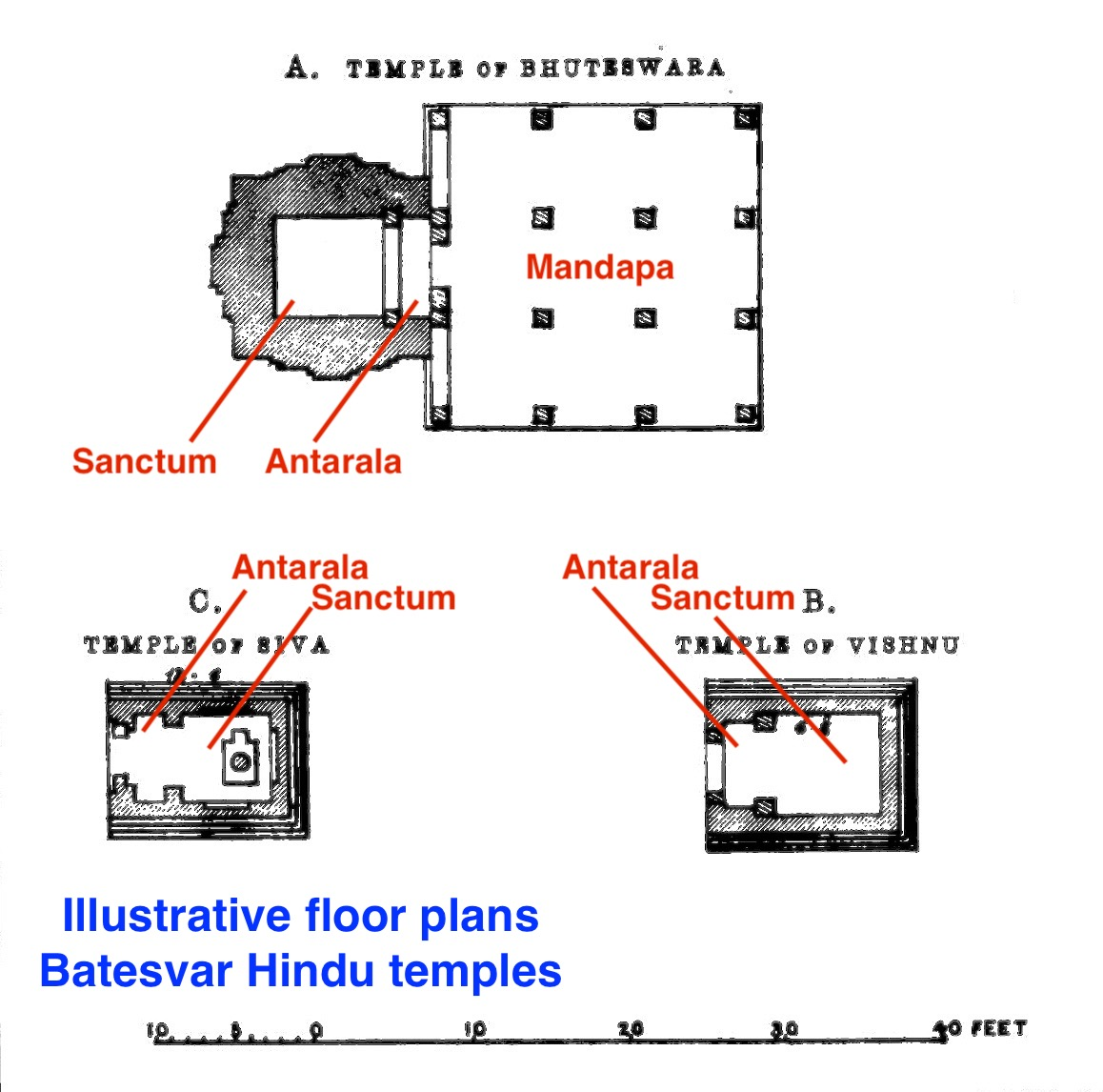
Three floor plans at the Batesvar site.

In north-northeast corner of the site was a large platform of about 42.67 feet (13.01 m) length and 29.67 feet (9.04 m) breadth, with an integrated platform projection of a square with 11.67 feet (3.56 m) side. Cunningham speculated that this may have been the largest temple at the Bateshvara site before its destruction, and he noted that not a stone remains near the platform to offer further clues as to what the lost temple was like. Cunningham also noted that one of the small temples to the northwest of the Bhuteshwara temple had a short inscription dated Samvat 1107 (1050 CE), thus establishing the floruit for the site.

The ASI team ruins identification and restoration efforts since 2005 have yielded the following additional information about the site:

- Some of the temples had a Nataraja on the kirti-mukha
- Reliefs with "exquisite carving" of Lakulisa
- Reliefs of Siva holding the hand of Parvati
- Reliefs narrating the legend of Kalyana-sundaram, or the marriage of Shiva and Parvati with Vishnu, Brahma and others attending
- Small sculptures of women playing the lute, veena or drums in Vishnu temples, suggesting that music profession in pre-11th century India encouraged women to participate as musicians
- Amorous couples in various stages of courtship and intimacy (mithuna, kama scenes)
- Secular scenes such as men riding elephants, men wrestling, lions
- Friezes with narratives from the Bhagavata Purana such as Krishna leela scenes such as Devaki holding baby Krishna who is suckling her breasts in prison that is guarded by a woman; Baby Krishna draining away the life of the demon with poisoned breasts, etc.

According to Gerd Mevissen, the Batesvar temples complex has many interesting lintels, such as one with Navagraha, many with Dashavatara (ten avatars of Vishnu) of the Vaishnavism tradition, frequent display of Saptamatrikas (seven mothers) from the Shaktism tradition. The presence of Navagraha lintel suggests, states Mevissen, that the temple complex must be dated after 600 CE. The diversity of the theological themese at the site suggest that Batesvar (also called Batesara) was once a hub for temple-related arts and artists.

== Significance ==
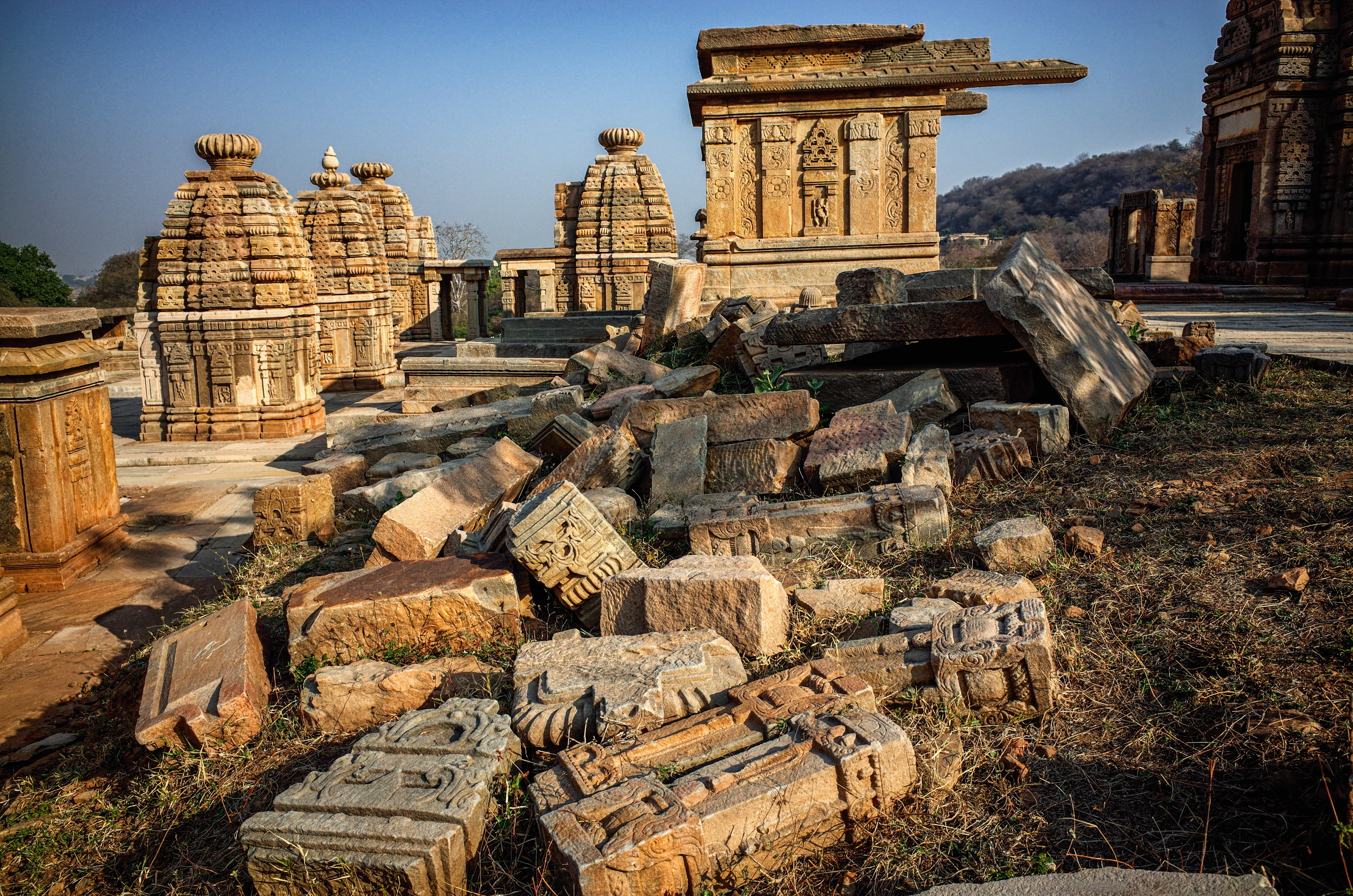
Ruins and different temple styles

According to Michael Meister, the Bateshwar site illustrates the conception and construction of "Mandapika shrine" concept in central India. It is reducing the Hindu temple idea to its basics, in a simple concept that is one step further from the single cave cell design. This design has roots in more ancient Hindu temples found in this region such as one that survives at Mahua and has a Sanskrit inscription that calls the design as sila mandapika (literally, a "stone pandal or pavilion". This has vedi-platform roots that combines the traditional square plan with various combinations of Hindu temple architecture elements. The temples explore a square sanctum mounted on a basement platform (jagati) that is rectangular, states Meister, so as to incorporate a small praggriva (porch).

These temples have a "simple pillared wall topped by a broad, flat-edged awning which extends beyond the sanctum to shade the entry as well. The square pillars rest directly on the vedibandha, and are crowned by "leaf capitals, their shafts engraved with decorative medallions. At its best this type has a very individual and decorative quality, still like a wooden or ivory box, intervening bands of meandering foliage especially vital, the whole framed by the flat, deeply shadowed vedibandha mouldings and the crisp chadya (with saw-tooth edge) above", according to Meister. The significance of these temples is that they fuse and experiment with a variety of temple building ideas, such as topping the nagara sikharas that may have been dominant by that time possibly in western India, on the simplest of temple grid plans with more ancient roots in central India.

== Modern history ==
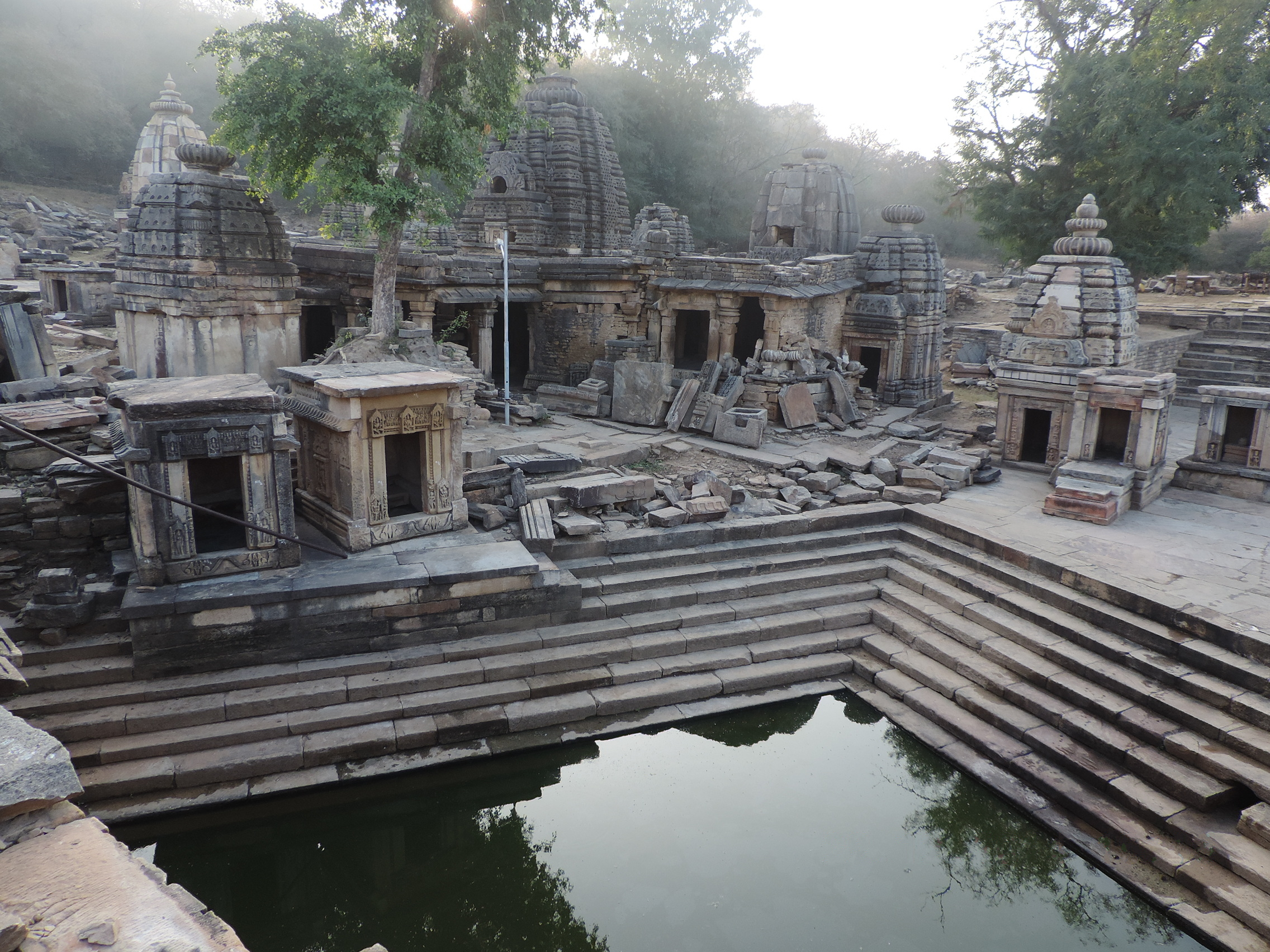
Water tank and stacked ruins

The site was visited and its ruins reported by Alexander Cunningham in 1882 as a "collection of more than 100 temples large and small to the southeast of Paravali Padavali", the latter with a "very fine old temple". Bateshwar was notified by Archaeological Survey of India (ASI) as a protected site in 1920. Limited recovery, standardized temple numbering, ruins isolation with photography, and site conservation effort was initiated during the colonial British era. Several scholars studied the site and included them in their reports. For example, the French archeologist Odette Viennot published a paper in 1968 that included a discussion and photographs of the numbered Batesvar temples.

In 2005, the ASI began an ambitious project to collect all the ruins, reassemble them and restore as many temples as possible, under an initiative led by the ASI Bhopal region's Superintending Archaeologist K.K. Muhammed. Under Muhammed's leadership, some 60 temples were restored. Muhammed has continued to campaign for the site's further restoration and calls it "my place of pilgrimage. I come here once in every three months. I am passionate about this temple complex."

K.K. Muhammed negotiated with dacoit Nirbhay Singh Gujjar, whose gang had its hiding place in the temple ruins. He said had Gujjar not been around the location, many precious idols would have been stolen. Muhammed also informed the infamous dacoit of his lineage- the Pratihara dynasty- which once ruled the area in the ancient past. Thus Nirbhay agreed to protect the construction. Next challenge was the mining mafia which had links with the government officials. K.K. Muhammed wrote to the concerned government authorities to stop the mining around the location which severely endangered the thousand year old heritage site. But nothing happened. Then he wrote to the then RSS chief, K.S Sudershan, as people of RSS were in the government. Within 24 hours things started to change and work could go forward.

== Gallery ==
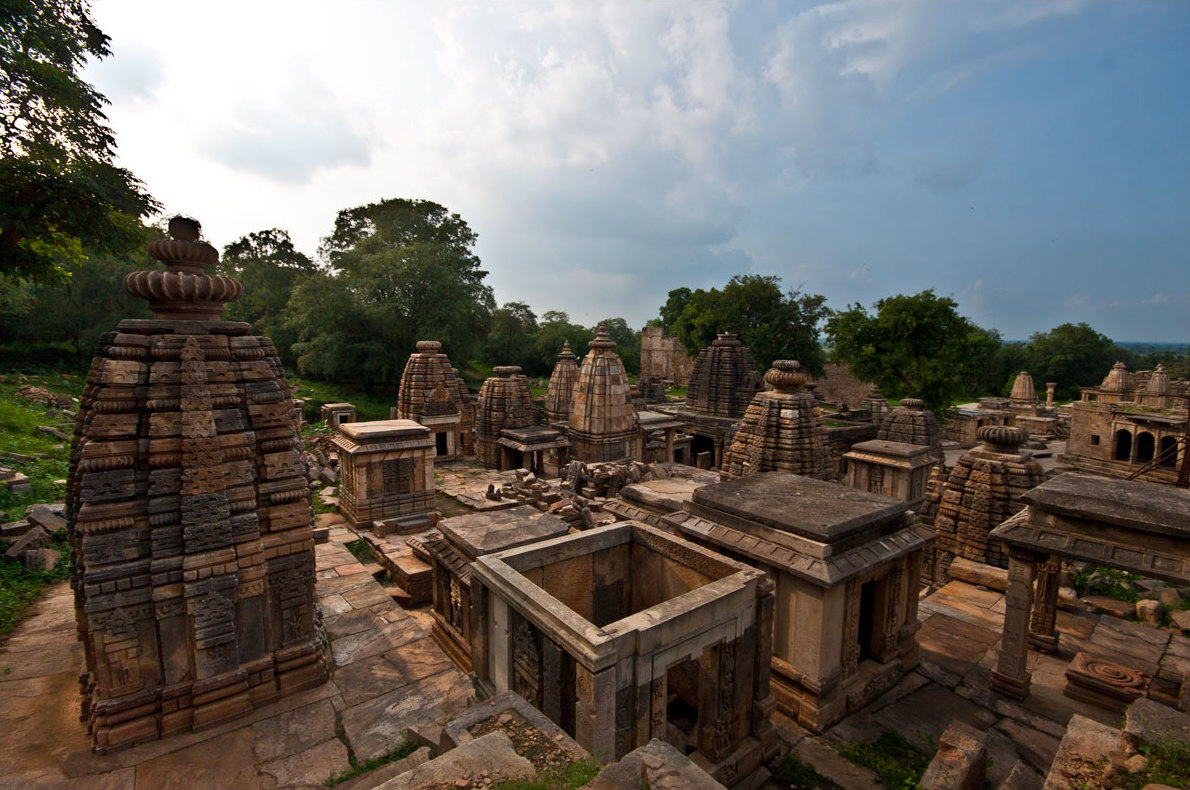
Ruins at the Batesvar site

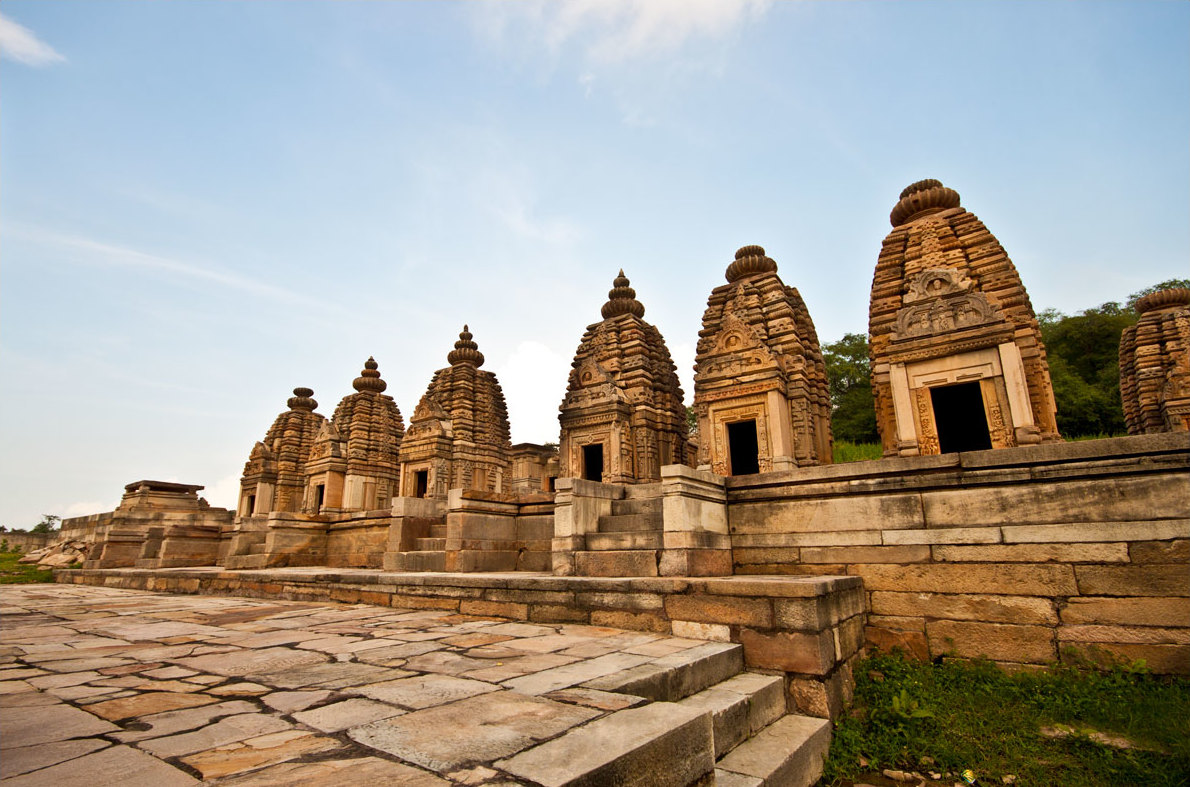
Restored temples

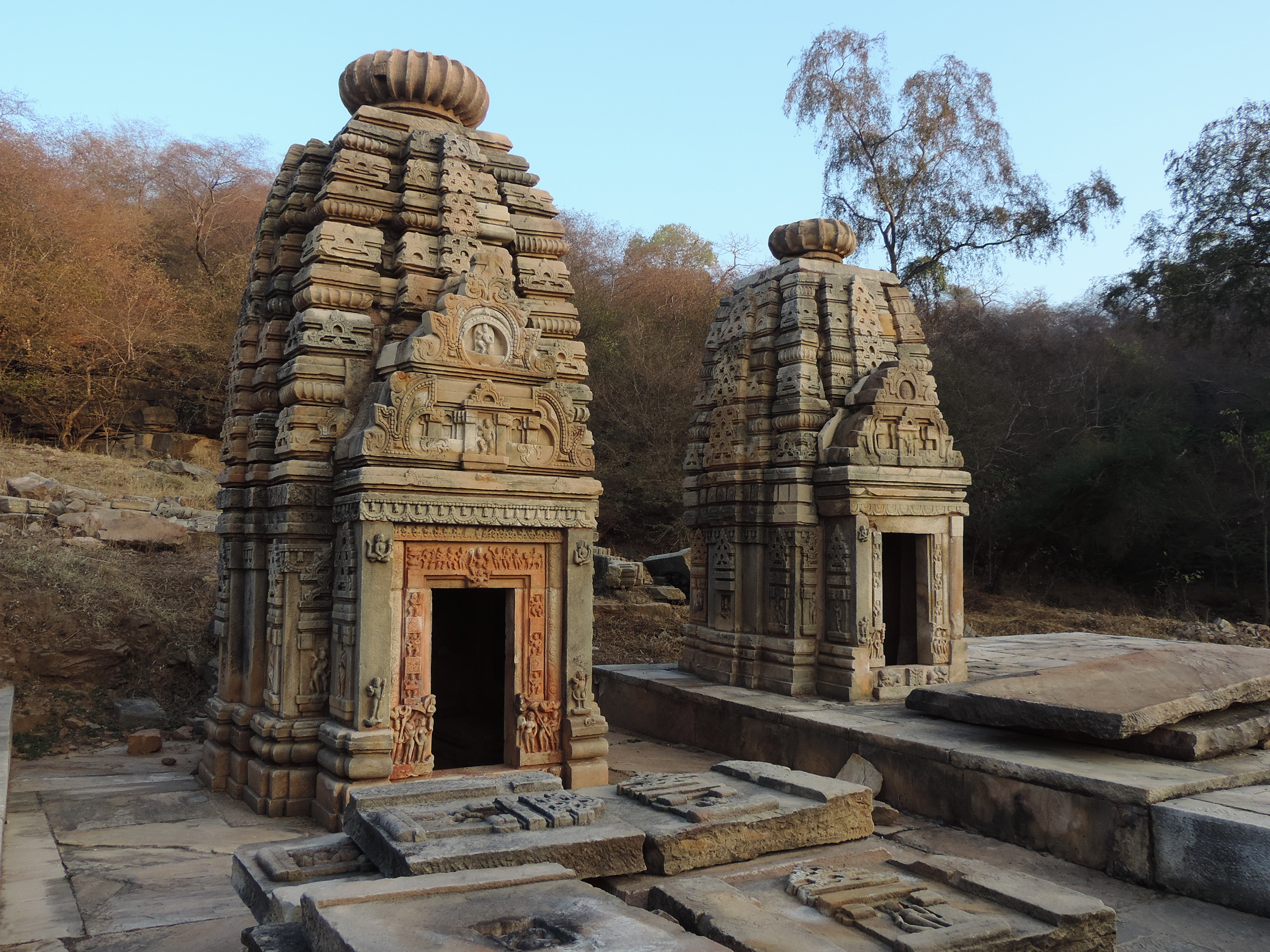
Two similar temples, some differences

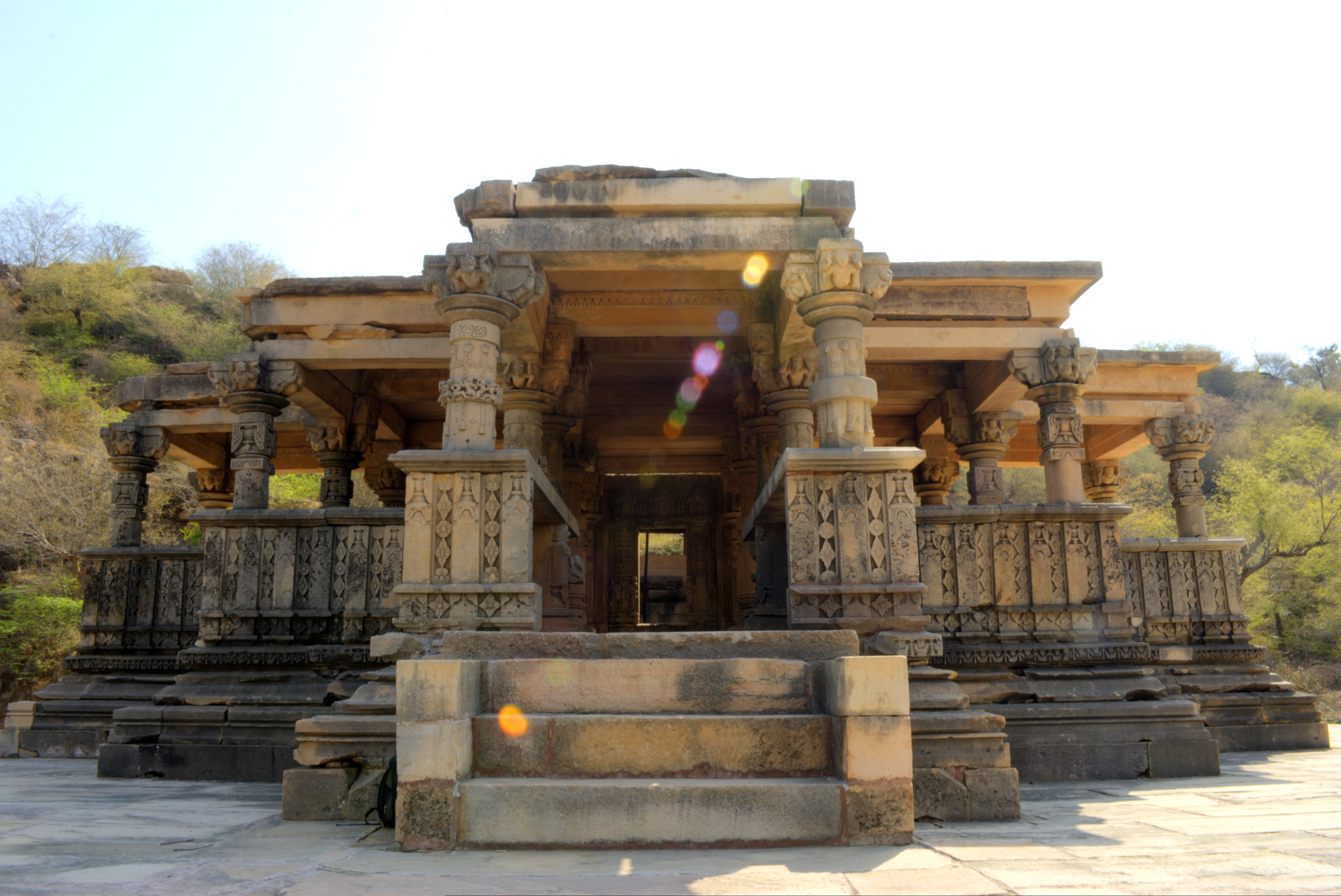
Vishnu temple at Batesvar

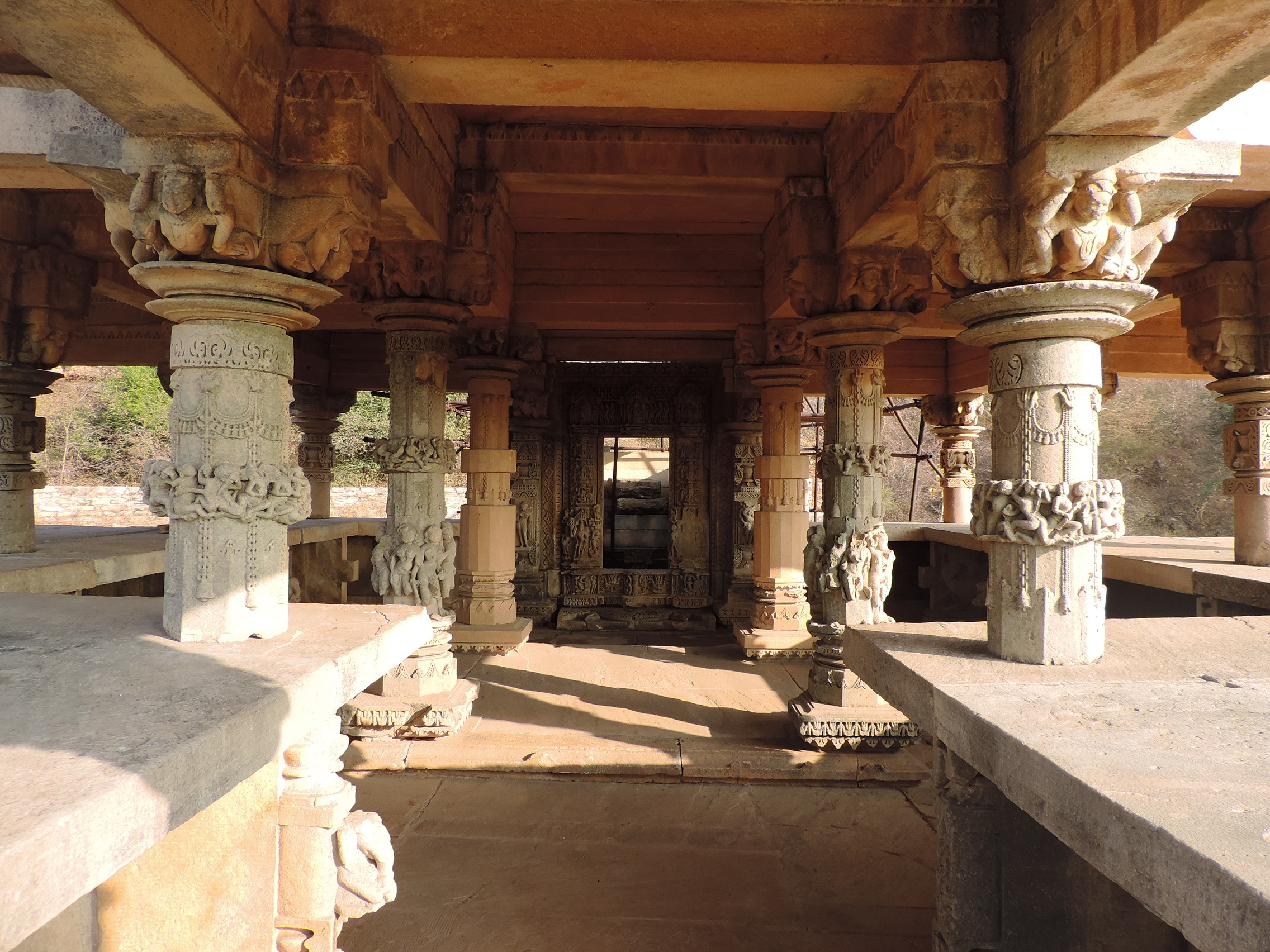
Vishnu temple interior from ruins

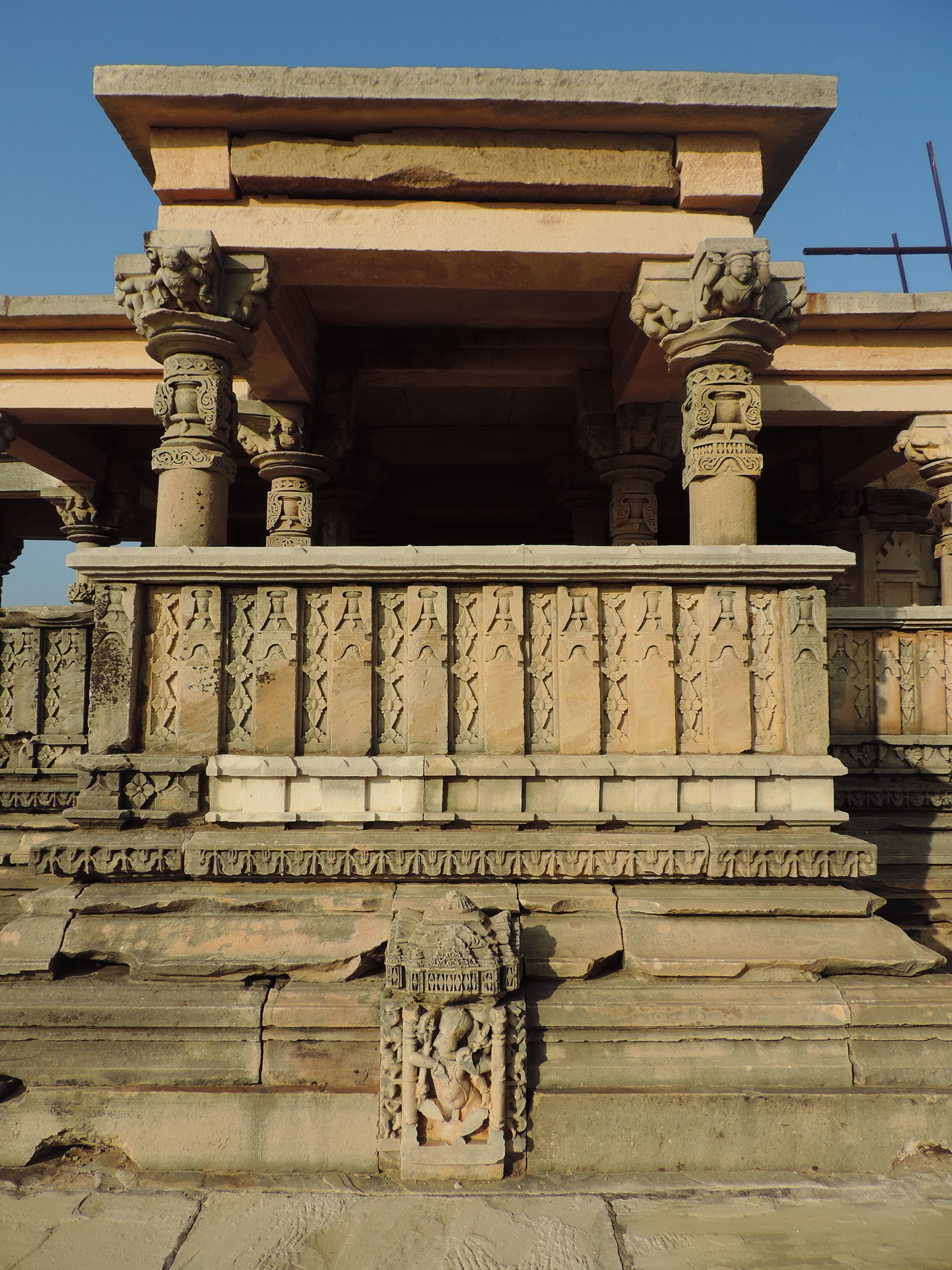
Vishnu temple, recreated by ASI

== See also ==
- Siddhachal Caves
- Teli ka Mandir
