= National Highway 552 (India) =

National Highway in India

National Highway 552
- Map of the National Highway in red

Route information
- Length: 555 km (345 mi)

Major junctions
- From: Tonk
- To: Chirgaon

Location
- Country: India
- States: Rajasthan, Madhya Pradesh, Uttar Pradesh
- Primary destinations: Uniara, Sawai Madhopur, Sheopur, Sabalgarh, Morena, Bhind

Highway system
- Roads in India; Expressways; National; State; Asian
← NH 52	→ NH 27

National Highway 552 (NH 552) is a National Highway in India. It is a spur road of National Highway 52. This highway traverses states of Rajasthan, Madhya Pradesh and Uttar Pradesh.

== Route ==
The official listed route length of this highway is 555 kilometres (345 mi).

Rajasthan

Tonk, Uniara, Sawai Madhopur.

Madhya Pradesh

Sheopur, Goras, Shampur, Sabalgarh, Morena, Ambah, Porsa, Ater, Bhind, Mihona, Bhander.

Uttar Pradesh

M.P. border - Small stretch of 4 km up to NH-27 near Chirgaon.

== Junctions list ==
NH 52 Terminal near Tonk.
NH 148D near Uniara.
NE 4 near Sawai Madhopur
NH 44 near Morena.
NH 719 near Bhind.
NH 27 Terminal near Chirgaon.

== See also ==
- List of national highways in India
- List of national highways in India by state
