= Chachiha =

Village and gram panchayat in Madhya Pradesh, India

Coordinates: 26°24′N 77°49′E

Chachiha is a village and gram panchayat in the tehsil of Joura, in the Morena district of the Indian state of Madhya Pradesh. In 2011 it had 2,053 inhabitants.
