= Ram Bilas Pachori =

Indian electrical engineer (born 1979)

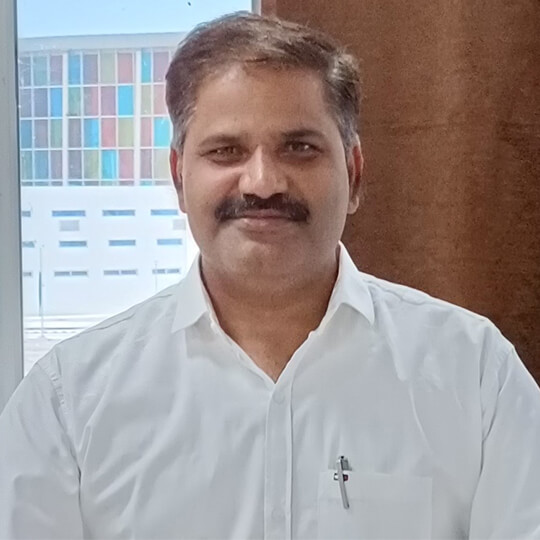
- Born: 1979 (age 46–47); Morena, Madhya Pradesh
- Education: Indian Institute of Technology Kanpur, Rajiv Gandhi Proudyogiki Vishwavidyalaya
- Honours: Fellow of IEEE, INAE, IET, IETE, IEI, AAIS
- Scientific career
- Fields: Signal processing, machine learning
- Workplaces: Indian Institute of Technology Indore, International Institute of Information Technology, Hyderabad, University of Technology of Troyes
- Website: Webpage

Ram Bilas Pachori (born 1979) is Institute Chair Professor and Professor (HAG) in the Department of Electrical Engineering at the Indian Institute of Technology Indore, India. He is also Adjunct Professor in the Department of Electronics & Communication Engineering at Dr. B. R. Ambedkar National Institute of Technology Jalandhar, India. His research focuses on signal processing, image processing, biomedical signal processing, non-stationary signal processing, speech processing, brain–computer interface, machine learning, and artificial intelligence and internet of things in healthcare.

== Recognitions ==
He was named a Fellow of the Institute of Electrical and Electronics Engineers (IEEE) in 2025, "for contributions to application of signal decomposition methods to biomedical engineering". He was also elected as a fellow of Indian National Academy of Engineering (INAE), Institution of Engineering and Technology (IET), Institution of Electronics and Telecommunication Engineers (IETE), Institution of Engineers (India) (IEI), and International Academy of Artificial Intelligence Sciences (AAIS). He was elected as a Foreign Member of the Luxembourg Academy of Sciences and Arts (LASA) in 2026. He was awarded IETE-Prof SVC Aiya Memorial Award in 2021 and IETE-Ram Lal Wadhwa Award in 2025. He has been appointed as IEEE EMBS Distinguished Lecturer and Academy Mentor for EURASIP Academy. Pachori was awarded IET Journals Premium Award for Best Paper in IET Science, Measurement & Technology for consecutive two years (2019 and 2020). He has also received the Best Paper Award in XXIV International Conference on Digital Signal Processing and Its Applications (DSPA 2022) held at Moscow, Russia. He has been recognized as a Top Cited Scholar for three consecutive years, from 2023 to 2025, on the Scilit website.

== Scientific contributions ==
Pachori pioneered the development of the relation between frequency domain and order of the Fourier-Bessel series expansion (FBSE) coefficients. This led to applicability of the FBSE for analyzing nonstationary signals. He has also extended the FBSE based methods for the analysis and processing of biomedical images. He has also proposed multiresolution analysis tools based on FBSE for biomedical signals and images. He has proposed non-stationary signal analysis method based on eigenvalue decomposition of Hankel matrix (EVDHM) for the first time in literature.

Pachori has also developed EVDHM-based methods resulting the time-frequency representation to get better insight of the signal being analysed. He has developed a sifting-based signal decomposition method with EVDHM, in a way similar to empirical mode decomposition method, for non-stationary signal processing. He has developed a new way of obtaining the time-frequency representation of a signal based on time-varying eigenvalues. Pachori has extended several univariate signal decomposition methods, including empirical wavelet transform to decompose multichannel signals.

He studied the effect of mantra meditation like listening to Shri Rudram Mantra and chanting of Hare Krishna Maha Mantra on human brain activity.

He authored the textbook Time-Frequency Analysis Techniques and their Applications (CRC Press, 2023).
