= Morena, Madhya Pradesh =

Morena
- Town
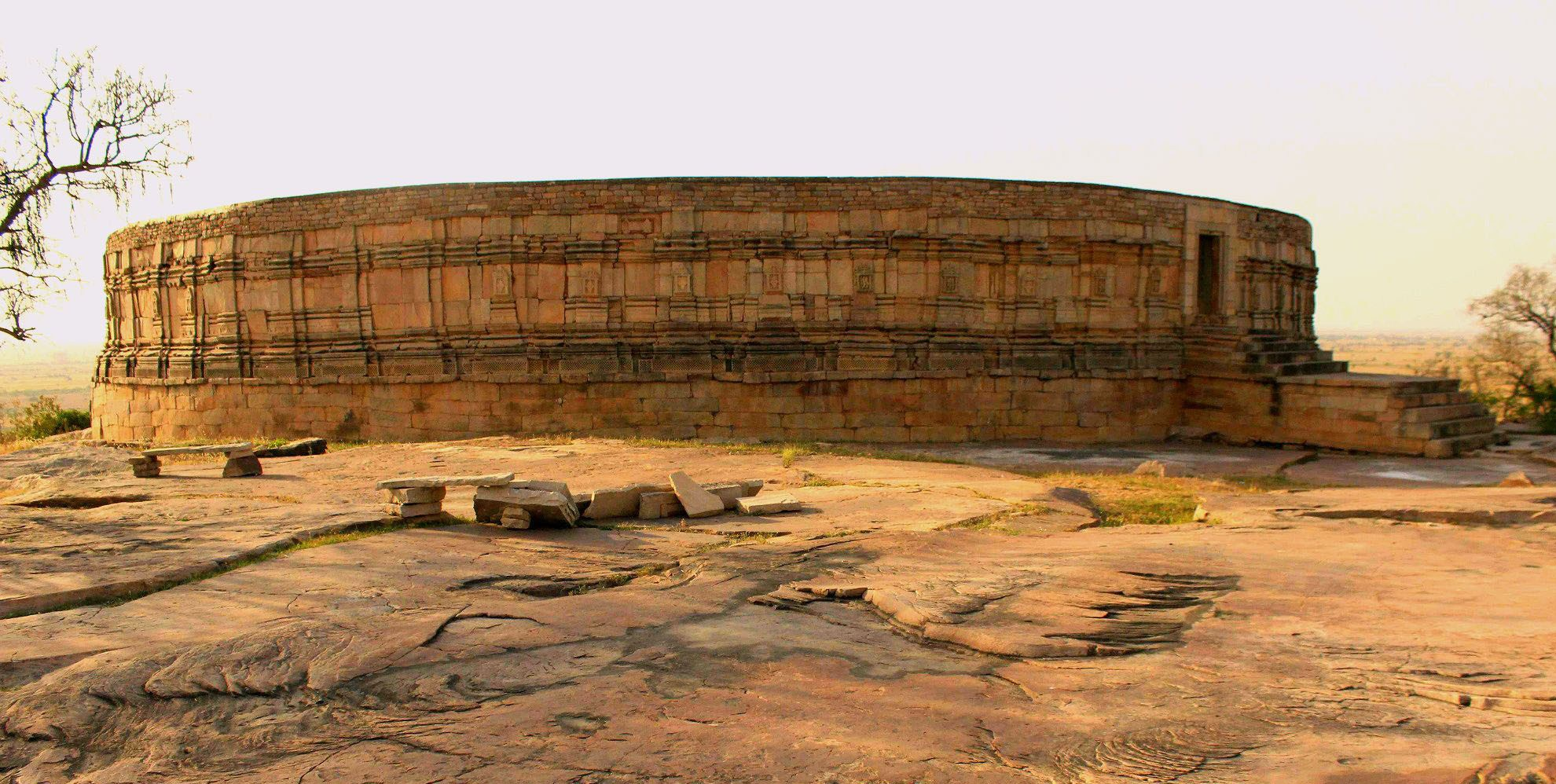
- Ekkatarso Mahadeva Temple, Morena
- Nickname: Town of Peacocks
- Location in Madhya Pradesh Morena (India)
- Coordinates: 26.5°N 78.0°E
- Country: India
- State: Madhya Pradesh
- District: Morena
- Region: Gwalior
- Division: Chambal

Government
  - MP: Shivmangal Singh Tomar (BJP)
  - Collector: Shri Lokesh Kumar Jangid (IAS)

Area
  - Total: 80 km^{2} (31 sq mi)
- Elevation: 177 m (581 ft)

Population (2011)
  - Total: 200,483
  - Rank: 154
  - Density: 2,500/km^{2} (6,500/sq mi)

Languages
  - Official: Hindi, English
  - Dialect: Braj Bhasha Bundeli
- Time zone: UTC+5:30 (IST)
- PIN: 476001
- Telephone code: 07532
- Vehicle registration: MP-06
- Website: morena.nic.in

Morena is a town and a district in the Indian state of northern Madhya Pradesh. The place gets its name from mor (meaning peacock) and raina, which means a place where peacocks are found in abundance; Morena is home to the largest number of peacocks in India.

Morena is situated on the border of three states: Madhya Pradesh, Rajsthan, and Uttar Pradesh. It is governed by a municipal corporation. It is also the administrative headquarters of the Chambal division. It is located 33 kilometres (21 mi) from Dholpur, 44 kilometres (27 mi) from Gwalior, 90 kilometres (56 mi) from Agra and 100 kilometres (62 mi) from Bhind.

Morena is famous for National Chambal Sanctuary which is home to Gharials, which extends upto Etawah. Famous sweet "Gajak" trails its origin to Morena which is made from jaggary.

== Geography ==
Morena is located at 26.5°N 78.0°E. It has an average elevation of 177 metres (580 feet).It is very famous for its Chambal ravines (locally known as Chambal Bharka).It is formed due to Thousands of years of erosion and change in course of river.

== Demographics ==
As of the 2011 Census of India, Morena had a population of 288,303. 13.2% of the population is under six years old. Literacy was 80.28%; male literacy was 89.08% and female literacy was 70.22%.

== Politics ==
There are six Vidhan Sabha constituencies in Morena district:

- Sabalgarh,
- Joura,
- Sumawali,
- Morena,
- Dimani, and
- Ambah.

== Economy ==
Morena district has an agrarian economy where majority of people are engaged in the agriculture and livestock rearing for dairy. There is an industrial area in Banmore where several industrial units are functioning.

== Public amenities ==
=== Healthcare ===
Kunwar Jahar singh sharma district hospital is government owned District Hospital in Morena. It is a 350 bed hospital with facilities like in-house doctors, Ultrasound facility, in-house Blood bank, E.C.G and Lens transplantation.

=== Education ===
Morena has several government and private owned schools. Schools in the district include:

- Kendriya Vidyalaya Morena
- Govt. Excellence Higher Secondary School No. 1, Morena
- Kerela convent school
- Saint mary high school
- GD School Joura
- Triveni High School
- MG Memorial School
- Neil World School
- J. S. Public School (a day boarding school)
- Academic Height Public School
- Krishna Convent School Khandoli
- Saraswati Shishu Vidya Mandir
- T.S.S INTERNATIONAL SCHOOL
- T.R GANDHI PUBLIC SCHOOL

==== Government Colleges in Morena ====
- Government PG College
- Government Maharaja College
- Government Polytechnic College
- Government Girls College
- Agriculture College in Morena

== Cuisines ==
- Gajak - Gajak is prepared with sesame seeds and jaggery with a method of preparation which is time consuming. It takes about 10–15 hours to prepare 5–8 kilograms of gajaks. The dough is hammered until all the sesame seeds break down and release their oils into the dough.
- Bedai sabji
- Kheer pua

== Tourist places ==
- Chausath Yogini Mandir
- National Chambal Sanctuary
- Shanidev Mandir
- Karah Ashram
- Bateshwar Temples
- Kakanmath Temple

== Notable people ==
- Ram Prasad Bismil, an Indian revolutionary from the village of Barbai
- Narendra Singh Tomar, Former union minister
- V. D. Sharma, MP and BJP state president
- Adal Singh Kansana, Minister in the Madhya Pradesh government
- Paan Singh Tomar, Athlete
- Manoj Kumar Sharma, IPS officer
- Ram Bilas Pachori, Indian Academician

== Transport ==
=== Road ===
Morena is situated on National Highway 3. The roadway connects all the parts of the state and nearby states such as Rajasthan and Uttar Pradesh. The city is situated at the heart of India and can be reached from anywhere in the country through National Highway No. 3. The city has Mofussil (city-to-city) bus services with connections to nearby towns, villages and cities.

=== Indian railways ===
Morena railway station is connected by train services to all parts of the country. Direct connections by train are available to these cities. Express trains such as the Bhopal Express, Taj Express and Bhopal Shatabdi and many more stop at Morena.

== See also ==
- List of cities in Madhya Pradesh
- टीन का टीन का पुरा
