= Banmore =

- Town
- Location in Madhya Pradesh, India Banmore (India)
- Coordinates: 26°21′12″N 78°6′0″E
- Country: India
- State: Madhya Pradesh
- District: Morena

Population (2001)
  - Total: 25,222

Languages
  - Official: Hindi
- Time zone: UTC+5:30 (IST)
- ISO 3166 code: IN-MP
- Vehicle registration: MP

Banmore is a town, tehsil and a nagar panchayat in Morena district in the state of Madhya Pradesh, India. Banmore Pin Code is 476444. Banmore comes under Morena district. PIN Code is also known as Zip Code or Postal Code.

== Demographics ==
As of 2001 India census, Banmore had a population of 25,222. Males constitute 54% of the population and females 46%. Banmore has an average literacy rate of 58%, lower than the national average of 59.5%; with 65% of the males and 35% of females literate. 18% of the population is under 6 years of age.

== Industries ==
Banmore industrial area is a huge area of industry, there is many industries based on engineering, chemical, and Agro. Some industries there are: Banmore Foam Private Limited, Paint manufacturers: Vijay Paint Industries, TMT bar manufacturers, Plastic product manufacturers: Hindustan Pipes and Fittings Pvt. ltd, Engineering companies: Inex Designs, Indian Engineering Company, N D Engineering Works etc.

== Transportation ==
Banmore is connected with roads and railways. Major highways crossing through there, Bhopal Agra Railway line connects it to India's railway network.
