= Pankaj Upadhyay =

Indian politician

- Born: 1981 (age 44–45)
- Occupation: Politician
- Political party: Indian National Congress

Pankaj Upadhyay (born 1981) is an Indian politician from Madhya Pradesh, India. He is an MLA of Indian National Congress from Joura Assembly constituency. He won the 2023 Madhya Pradesh Legislative Assembly election. He received a total of 89,253 votes and won with the margin of 30,281 votes.

== Legal affairs ==
In 2020, an FIR was registered against Pankaj Upadhyay in Murena for violation of the code of conduct and COVID rules. This FIR was filed against gathering crowds at the election rally of former Chief Minister Kamal Nath held on October 22 and not making arrangements to protect that crowd from Corona virus.
