= National Cybercrime Reporting Portal =

Indian website

National Cybercrime Reporting Portal is online reporting portal set up by Government of India to help victims of Cyber crime and Cyber fraud. It was launched on 11 December 2023.

It is accessible via the official website cybercrime.gov.in and is supported by the toll-free helpline number 1930 (Indian Cybercrime Helpline), which is dedicated to reporting cybercrimes, especially financial frauds.

== See also ==
- Cybersecurity
