= Chambal division =

Administrative division of Madhya Pradesh, India

Coordinates: 26.5°N 78°E

Map of Chambal division

The Chambal Division is an administrative geographical unit of Madhya Pradesh state of India. A river by the name Chambal, a tributary of Yamuna River, forms the boundary between Rajasthan and Madhya Pradesh, in the upper part of the Chambal Division. Morena is the administrative headquarters of the division. As of 2012, the division consists of the three districts of Bhind, Morena and Sheopur.

The current Divisional Commissioner of this division is Shri. Sanjeev Kumar Jha, IAS 1996 batch MP Cadre. He holds the charge of Chambal Division. Smt.Renu Tiwari IAS 2000 batch was the first female commissioner of the division.
