= Ambah =

Ambah Morena Ambah Ambrish nagari
- city
- Ambrish
- Nickname: Ambrish Nagari
- Location in Madhya Pradesh, India
- Coordinates: 26.71°N 78.23°E
- Country: India
- State: Madhya Pradesh
- District: Morena
- Founder: Ambrish

Government
  - Type: Municipal Council
  - Body: Madhya Pradesh Legislative Assembly
  - Sub Divisional Magistrate: Rajiv Samadhiya (Deputy Collector)
  - Rank: 1

Population (2011)
  - Total: 258,689

Languages
  - Official: Hindi
- Time zone: UTC+5:30 (IST)
- PIN: 476111
- Telephone code: 07538

Ambah is a city and a municipality in Morena district in the state of Madhya Pradesh, India. It is the administrative headquarter of Ambah-Porsa Block. It was formerly known as Ambrish Nagari.Devendra Sakhwar (SC) of the Congress party is the present MLA from Ambah-Porsa Constituency.

Hindi is a main speaking language here and brajbhasha is also spoken by local and rural people.

== Geography ==
Ambah is located at 26.71°N 78.23°E. It has an average elevation of 161 metres (528 feet). This area is located near the Chambal Ghat. River Chambal flows very near to Ambah and forms the border between M.P. and U.P. and M.P. and Rajasthan. It is famous for its ancient fort and Kakanmath temple.

Ambah lies on State Highway no. 2 of Madhya Pradesh.

== Demographics ==
As of the 2011 Census of India, Ambah has a population of 258,689. Males constitute 54% of the population and females 46%. Ambah has an average literacy rate of 64%, lower than the national average of 73%; with 72% of the males and 54% of females literate. Ambah is part of Tanwarghar and Tomar Rajputs having significant population of Brahmins and Gurjars also.

== Schools and colleges ==
Ambah has several primary, secondary, and higher secondary schools. Almost 200+ schools.

=== Ambah Post Graduate College ===
Ambah Post Graduate College was established in 1959 as the first academic institution of higher learning in the town. It was given autonomous status in 1989 by the University Grants Commission (UGC) and is approved by the state government and the Jiwaji University, Gwalior in recognition of its performance and its potential.

=== Shri TekChand Jain Higher Secondary School ===
Shri Tekchand Jain Higher Secondary School was established in 1950. It is affiliated to C.B.S.E. and Board of Secondary Education, Madhya Pradesh. In 2019–20 director is Anshul Jinesh Jain and owner Viraat Rahul Jain.

== Religious status ==
Ambah is primarily a Hindu-dominant town. Rajputs are prominent in this area along with other castes. There are hundreds of places of religious importance (mostly Hindu temples and a couple of mosques) in and around Ambah. There are five Jain temples in Ambah.

== Transport ==
The only mode of transport to Ambah is by road. The closest railway station is Morena .There is frequent public transport (mostly private buses/UVs) available between Ambah and Morena. The most prominent city close to Ambah is Gwalior. Means of transport are improving day by day. An open window reservation office has been opened in Ambah so that reservations for trains can be made.

== Health facilities ==
Ambah Civil Hospital is a large hospital in Morena district. Routine camps and vaccine camps are organized throughout the year. There are several private hospitals in Ambah.

Every year an Eye Operation Camp is also organized by Red Cross with the help of a local NGO.

== Fairs and activities ==
During February and March every year, an animal fair is organized by the local municipality. The fair starts about three weeks prior to Holi and lasts two weeks.

This fair is known as Jayeshwar Mahadev Mela (in the name of an ancient Lord Shiva temple). The fair usually starts around three weeks before Holi and ends on the previous evening of the festival. The fair is a convergence of all the rural cultures prevailing villages and towns around Ambah. The major plays and drama skits are conducted in the regional language and by regional artists.

== Other ==
Ambah is the hometown of Pandit Ramprasad Bismil, a freedom fighter and birthplace of Paan Singh Tomar, a well-known Indian soldier, athlete, and baaghi (rebel) and Narayan Singh Rathore a well known kachi.

Association of Charmanvati Geographers, Ambah (M.P.), publishes the research journal Charmanvati.ISSN 2277-9892
