= Porsa =

Porsa Nagaji Dham Porsa
- Tehsil
- Nickname: Nagaji Dham Porsa
- Location in Madhya Pradesh, India Porsa (India)
- Coordinates: 26.67°N 78.37°E
- Country: India
- State: Madhya Pradesh
- District: Morena
- Founder: Nagaji Maharaj
- Named for: Nagaji

Government
  - Type: Government of Madhya Pradesh
  - Body: Municipal council (India)
  - Tehsildar: Mr. Naresh Sharma
  - Rank: 2
- Elevation: 1,054 m (3,458 ft)

Languages
  - Official: Hindi
- Time zone: UTC+5:30 (IST)
- Postal code: 476115
- Website: www.porsa.nic

Porsa is a town and a municipality in the Morena district of the Indian state of Madhya Pradesh.

== Administration ==
The governing body is a Tehsildar.

== Culture ==
Porsa is known for its Nagaji Maharaj Temple, thus its alternate name of Nagaji Dham Porsa. It is named for Nagaji Mahara, who lived in Porsa during the period of the Mughal Emperor Akbar (1542–1605). And porsa also famous for muktidham, Nagaji gausala porsa( sanchalak sant shree brajkishore pagaldash maharaji ji ) our other branches is located at budhara village and far from porsa almost 6km

== Education ==
Colleges in Porsa include Shivam College, RVS College, NAS College, Shriram College and Government College of Porsa.

== Demographics ==
According to the 2001 Census of India, Porsa had a population of more than 50,000. 56% were male and 44% female. 17% of the population is under six years of age. The literacy rate is 68%, higher than the national average of 59.5%. The male literacy rate is 75% while 56% of females are literate.
