= Jaura, Madhya Pradesh =

Town in Madhya Pradesh, India

Jaura
- jel mai
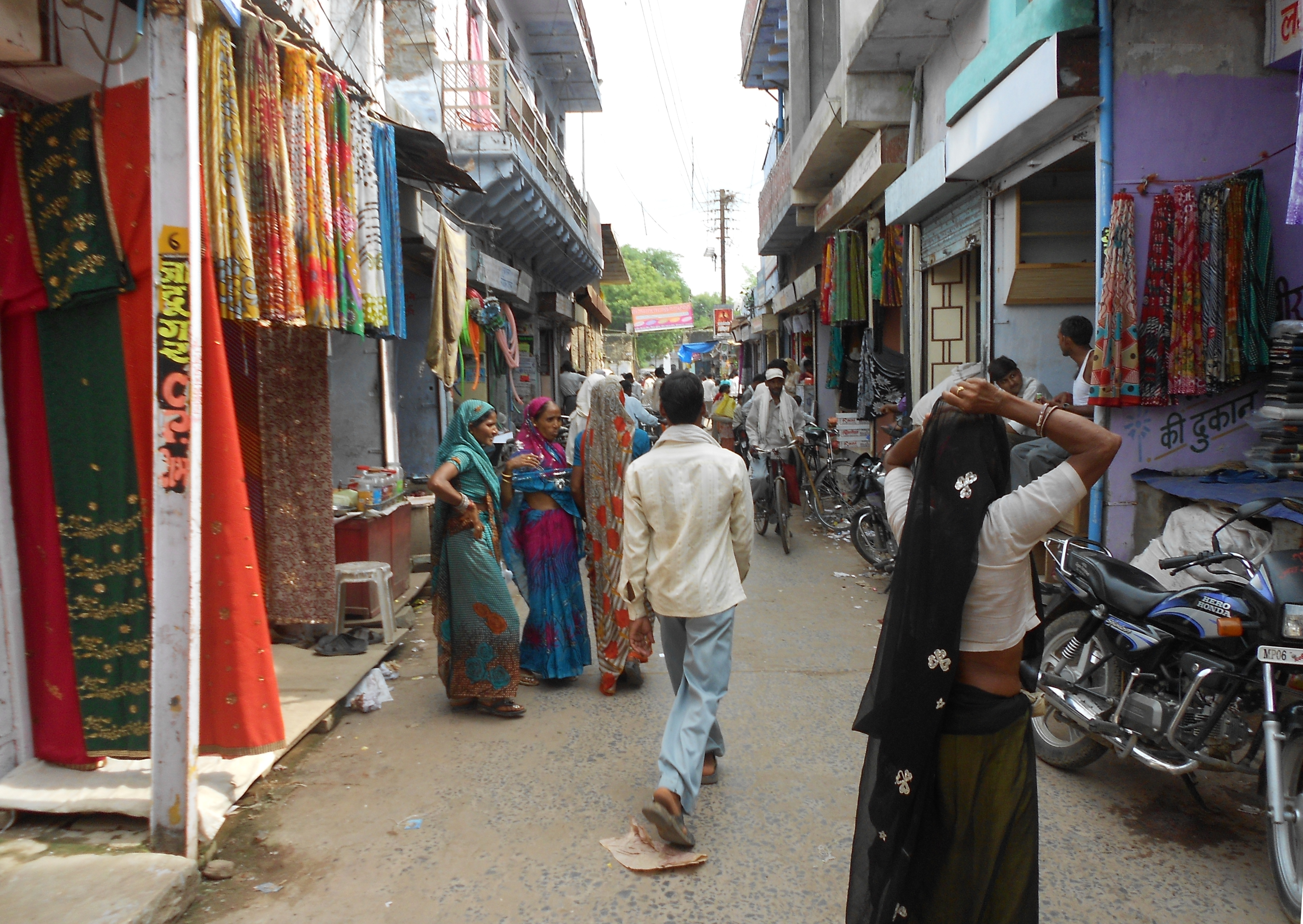
- Nickname: City of Guava
- Location in Madhya Pradesh, India Jaura (India)
- Coordinates: 26°20′40″N 77°48′41″E
- Country: India
- State: Madhya Pradesh
- District: Morena

Population (2001)
  - Total: 25,514

Languages
  - Official: Hindi
- Time zone: UTC+5:30 (IST)
- Postal code: 476221

Jaura (also spelt Joura or Jora) is a town and a nagar palika in Morena district in the Indian state of Madhya Pradesh.

Jaura is part of Morena Lok Sabha constituency along with seven other Vidhan Sabha segments, namely, Sabalgarh, Sumawali, Morena, Dimani and Ambah in this district and Sheopur and Vjaypur in Sheopur district.

Jaura is also a railway station on the Gwalior Light Railway, a narrow-gauge line from Gwalior to Sheopur.

== Demographics ==
As of the 2011 Census of India, Joura had a population of 398,111. Males constitute 54% of the population and females 46%. Joura has an average literacy rate of 55.8% (as per 2001 census, it was 64%), less than the national average of 74%: male literacy is 66%, and female literacy is 42.6%. In Joura, 16% of the population is under 6 years of age.

Among the villages that pertain to the tehsil of Jaura is gram panchayat Chachiha. Visiting place :- Pagara Dam, Tiktoli Waterfall

== Gallery ==
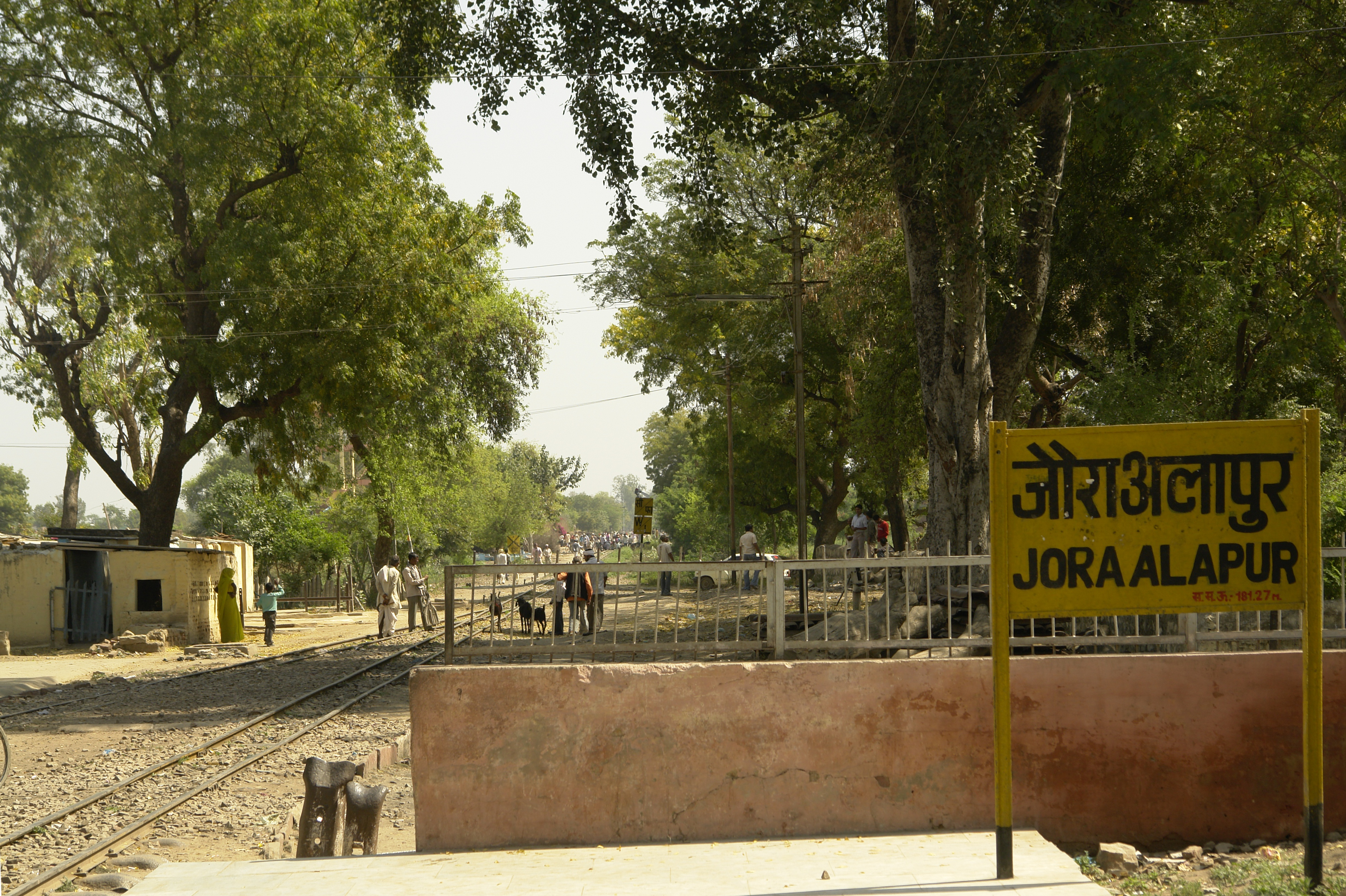
Jaura railway station

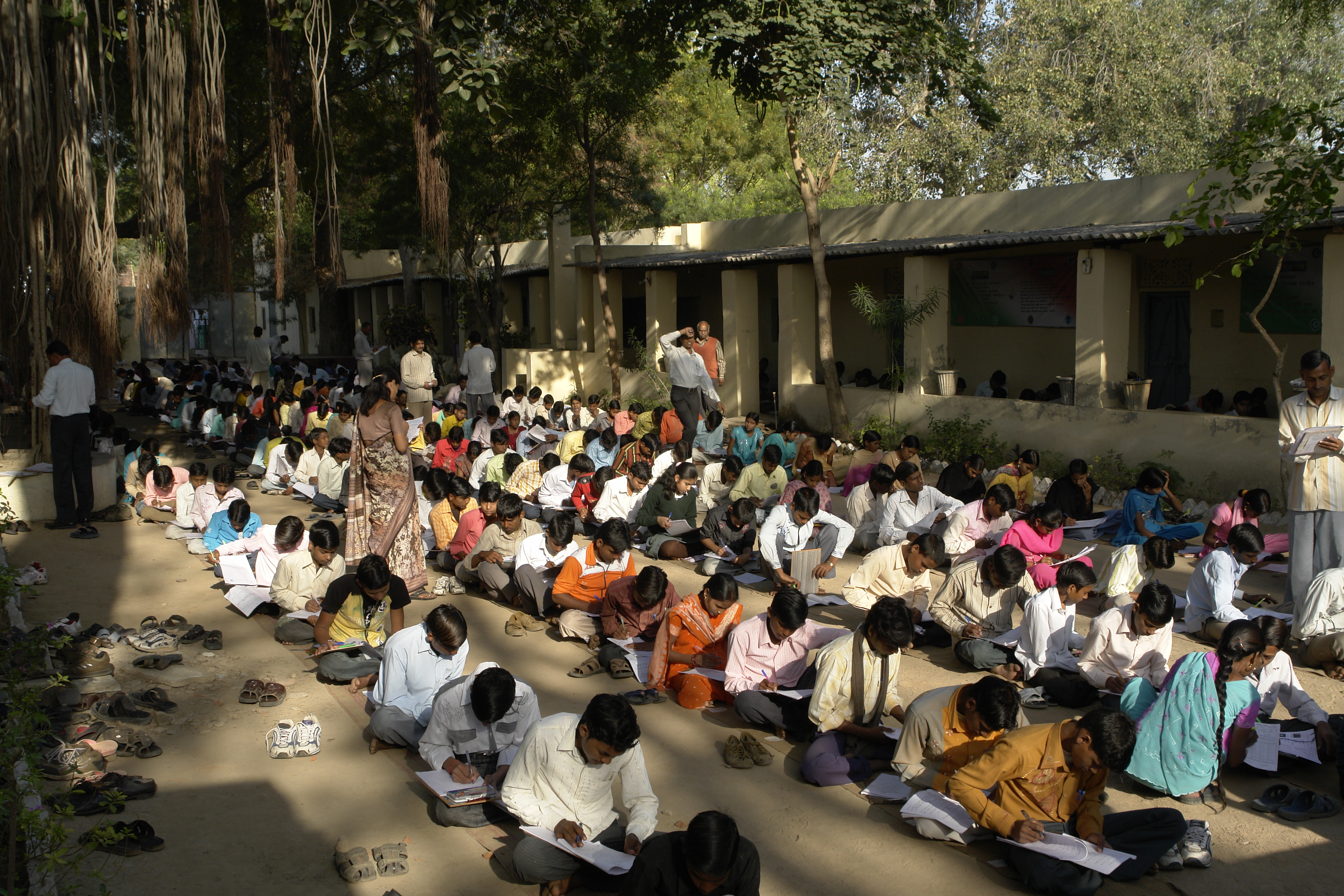
Exams in Jaura

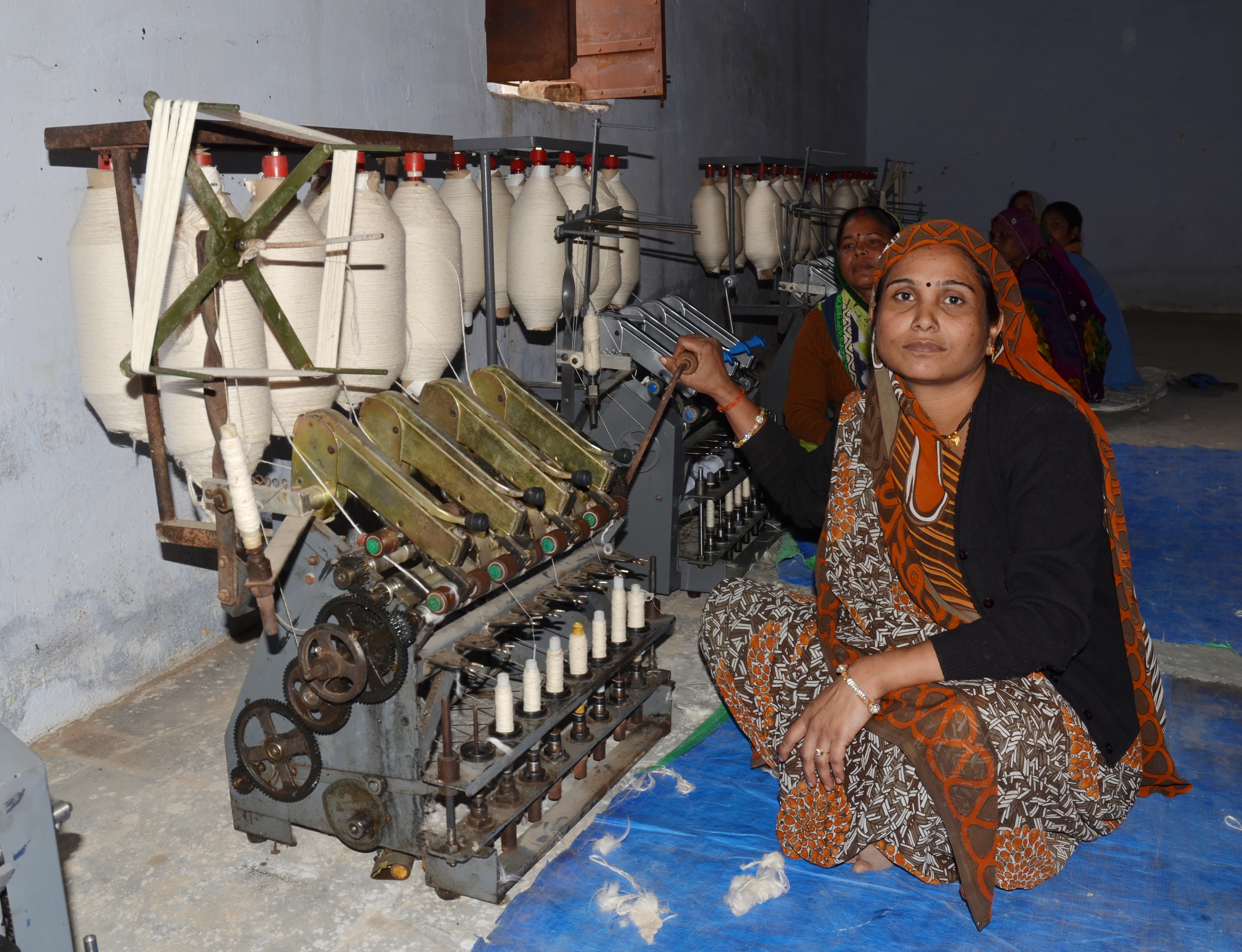
Woman doing a khadi training, Mahatma Gandhi Seva Ashram, Jaura

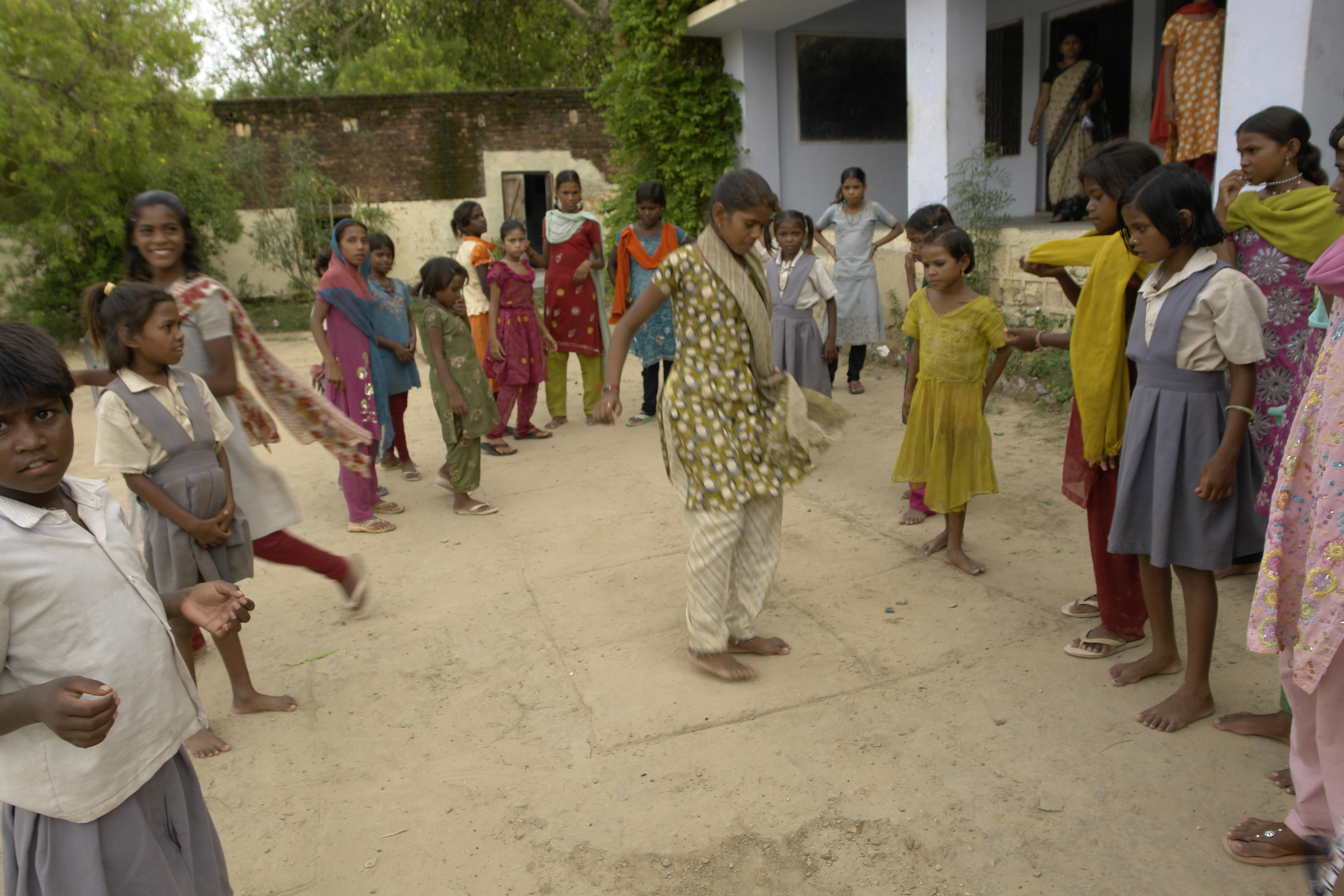
Girls playing hopscotch, Jaura

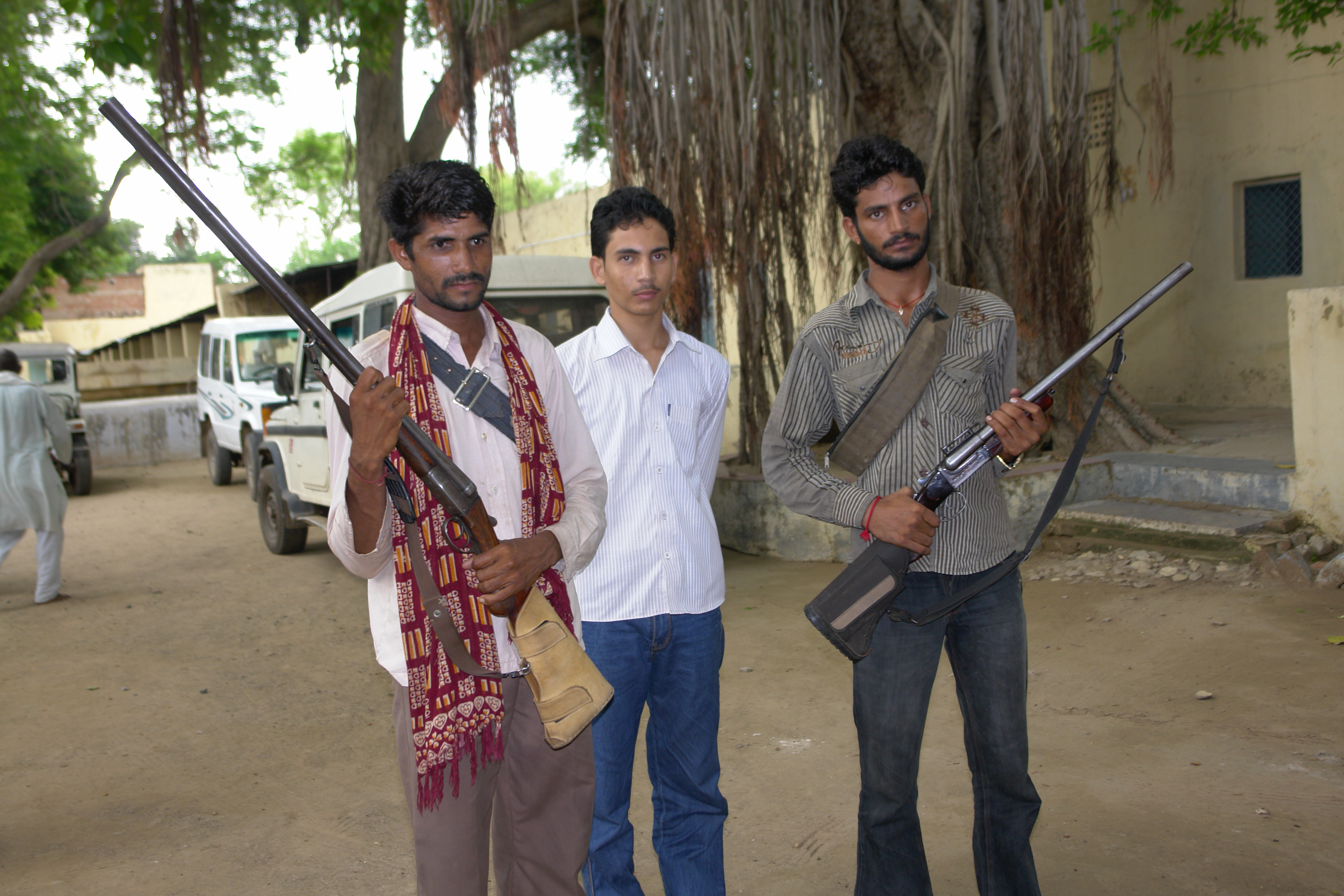
Men with guns, Jaura

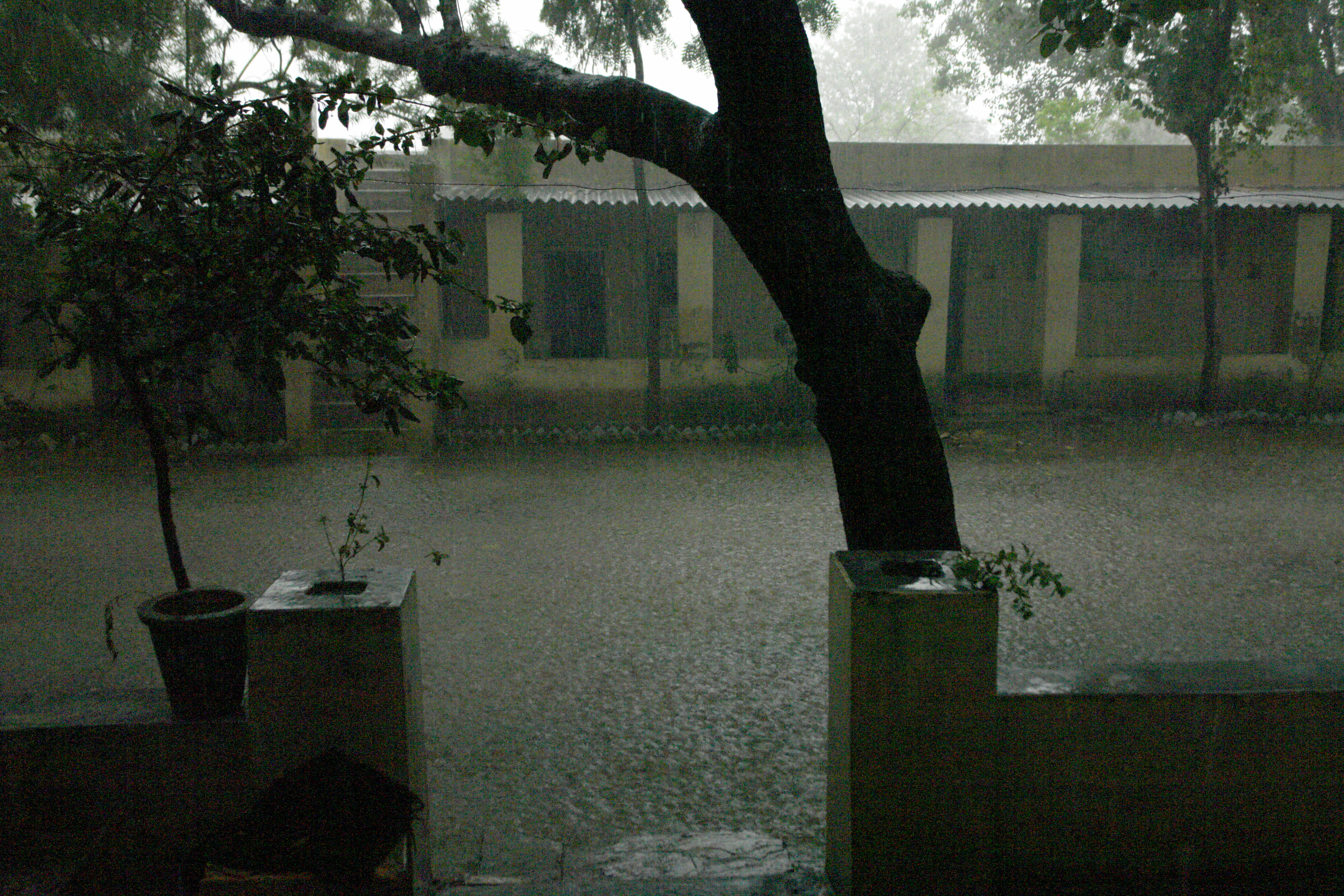
Monsoon, Jaura

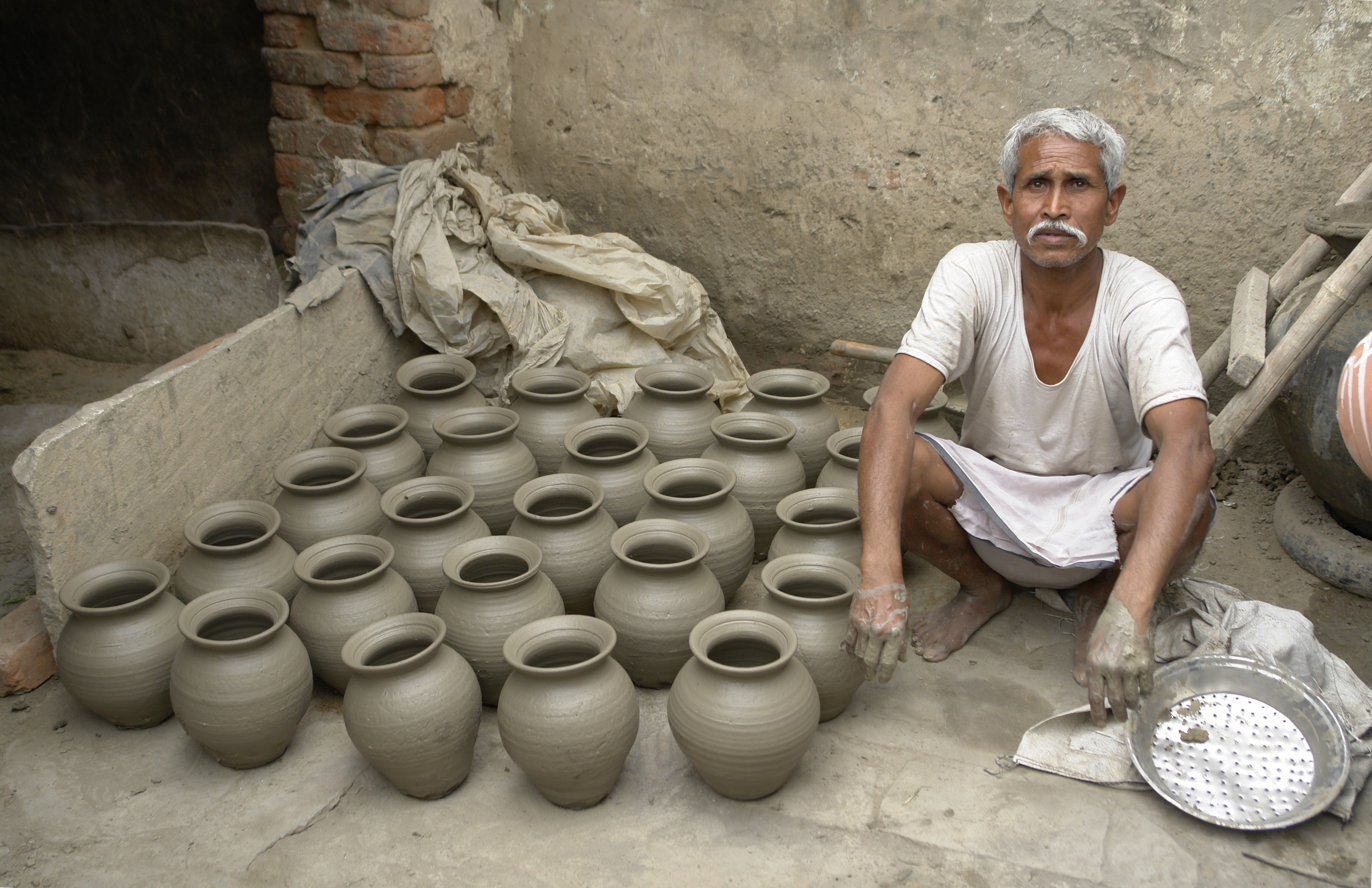
Potter and his work, Jaura

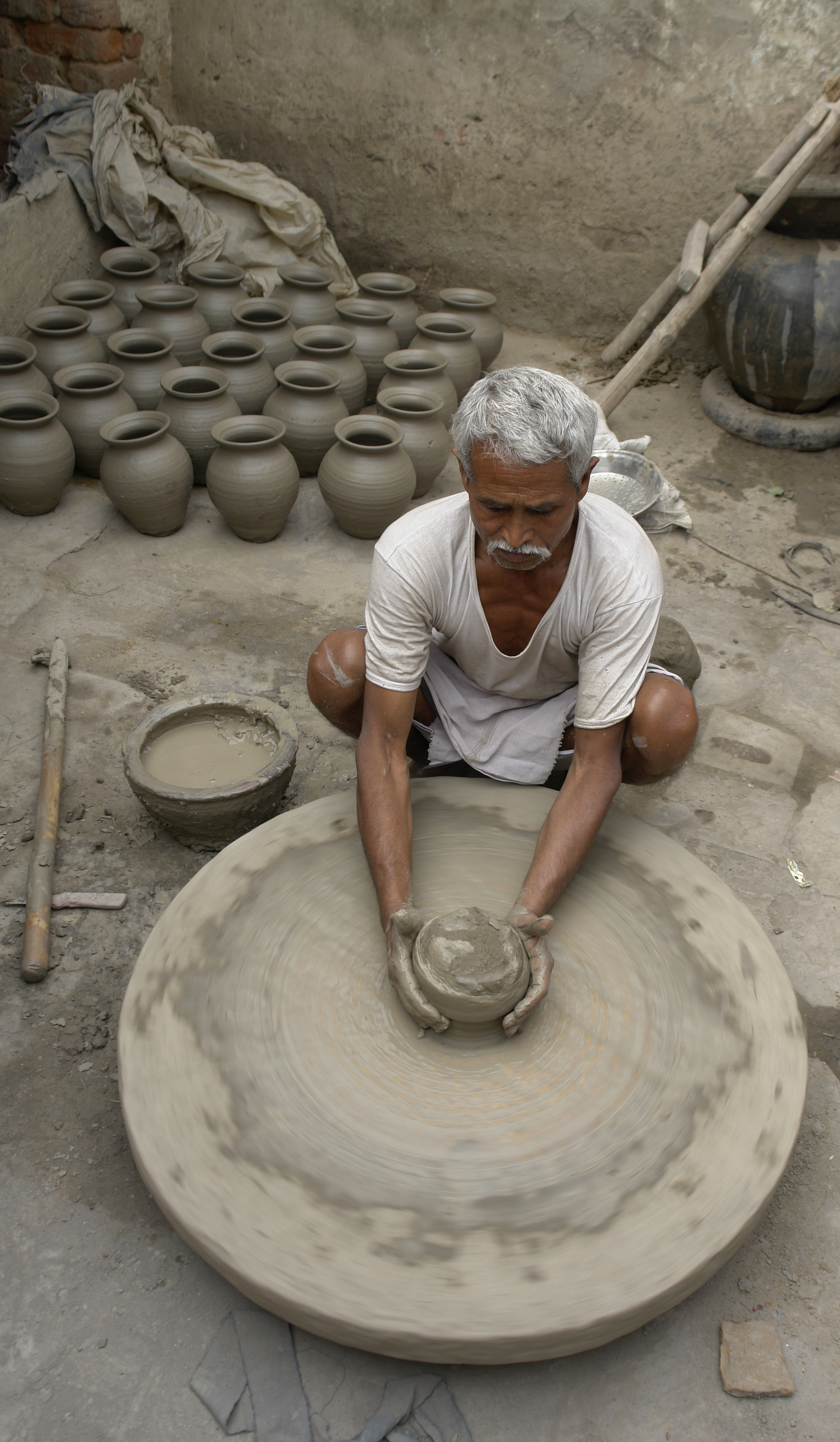
Potter at work, Jaura

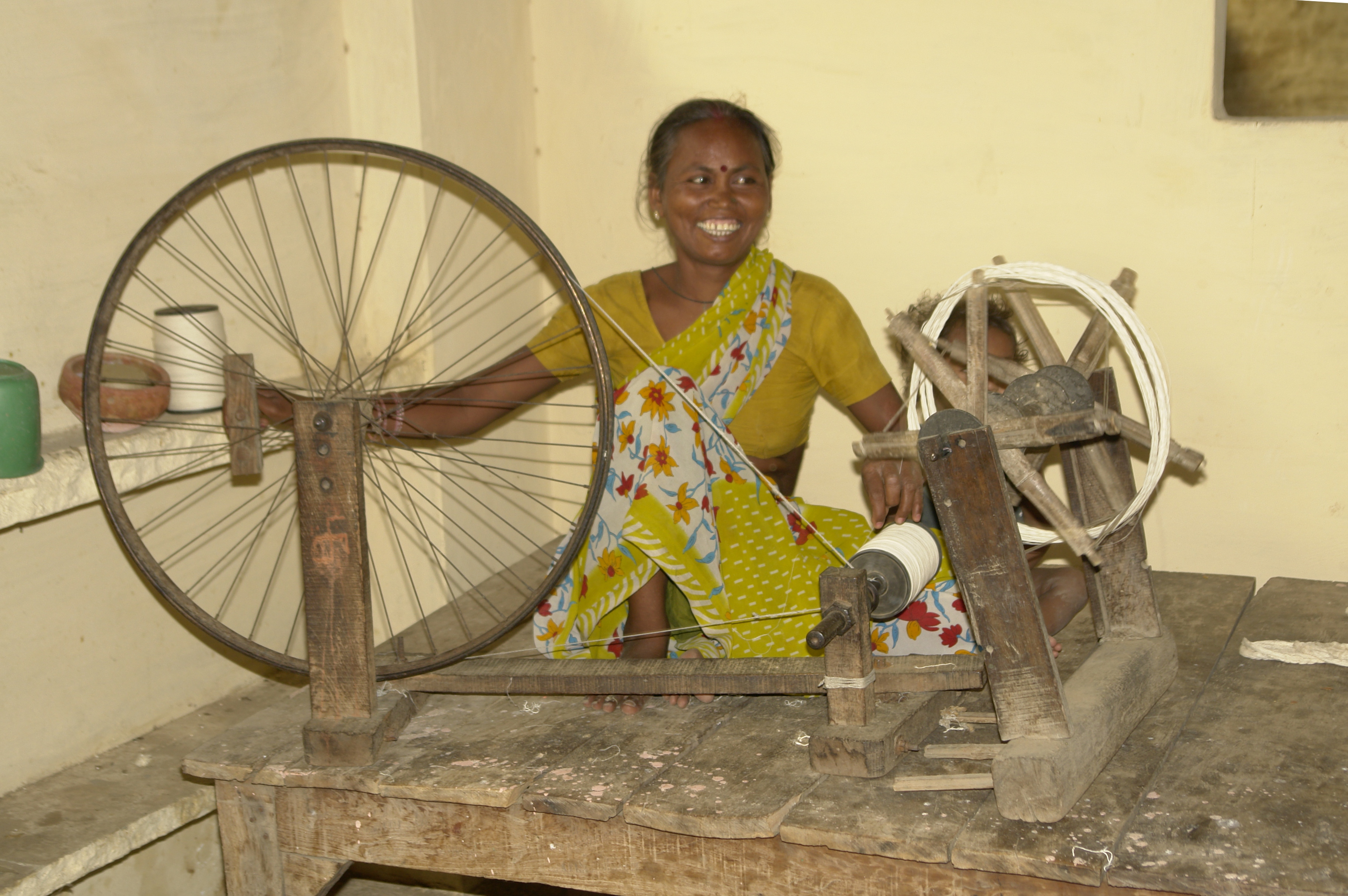
Woman spinning, Jaura

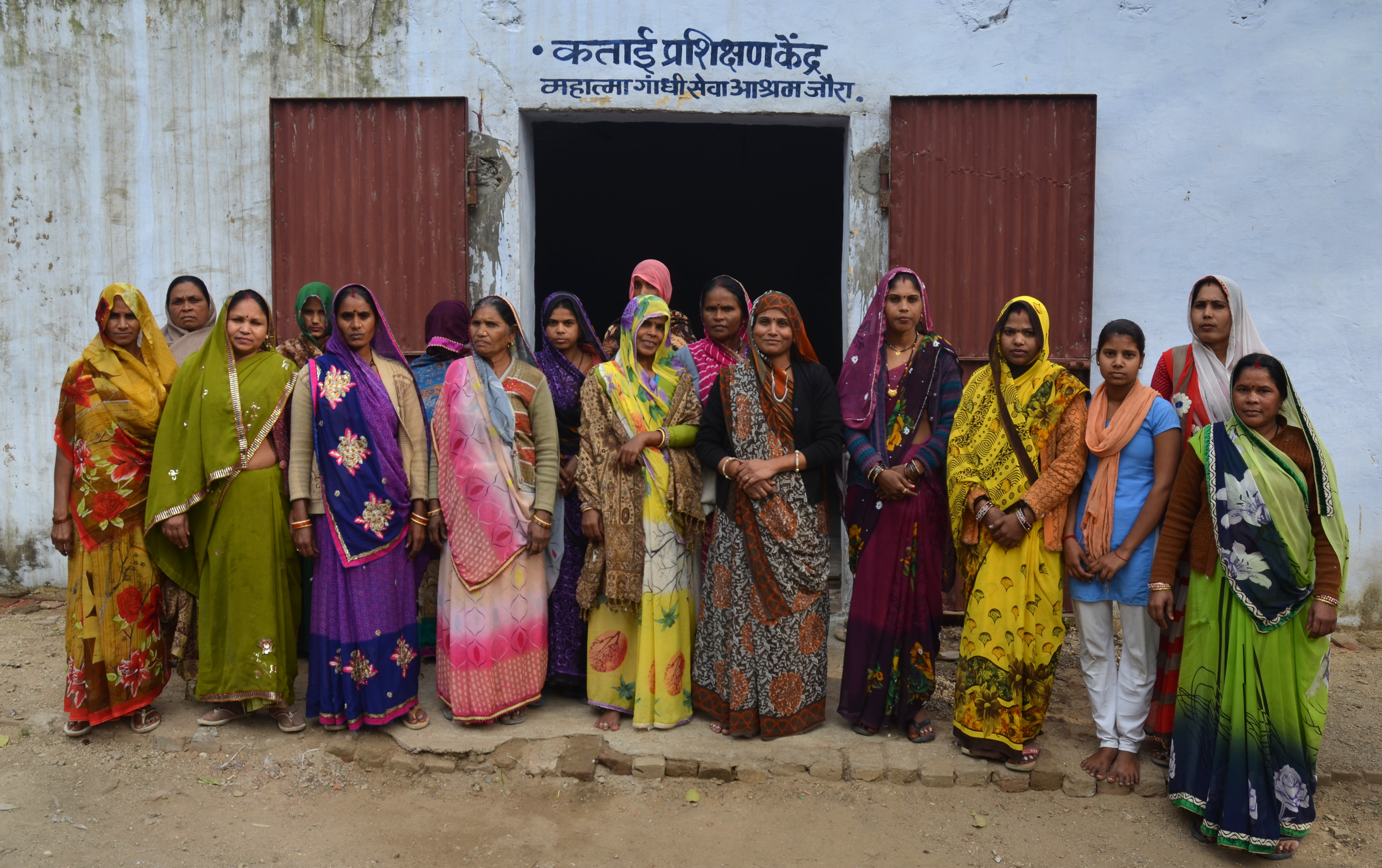
Women doing a khadi training, Jaura

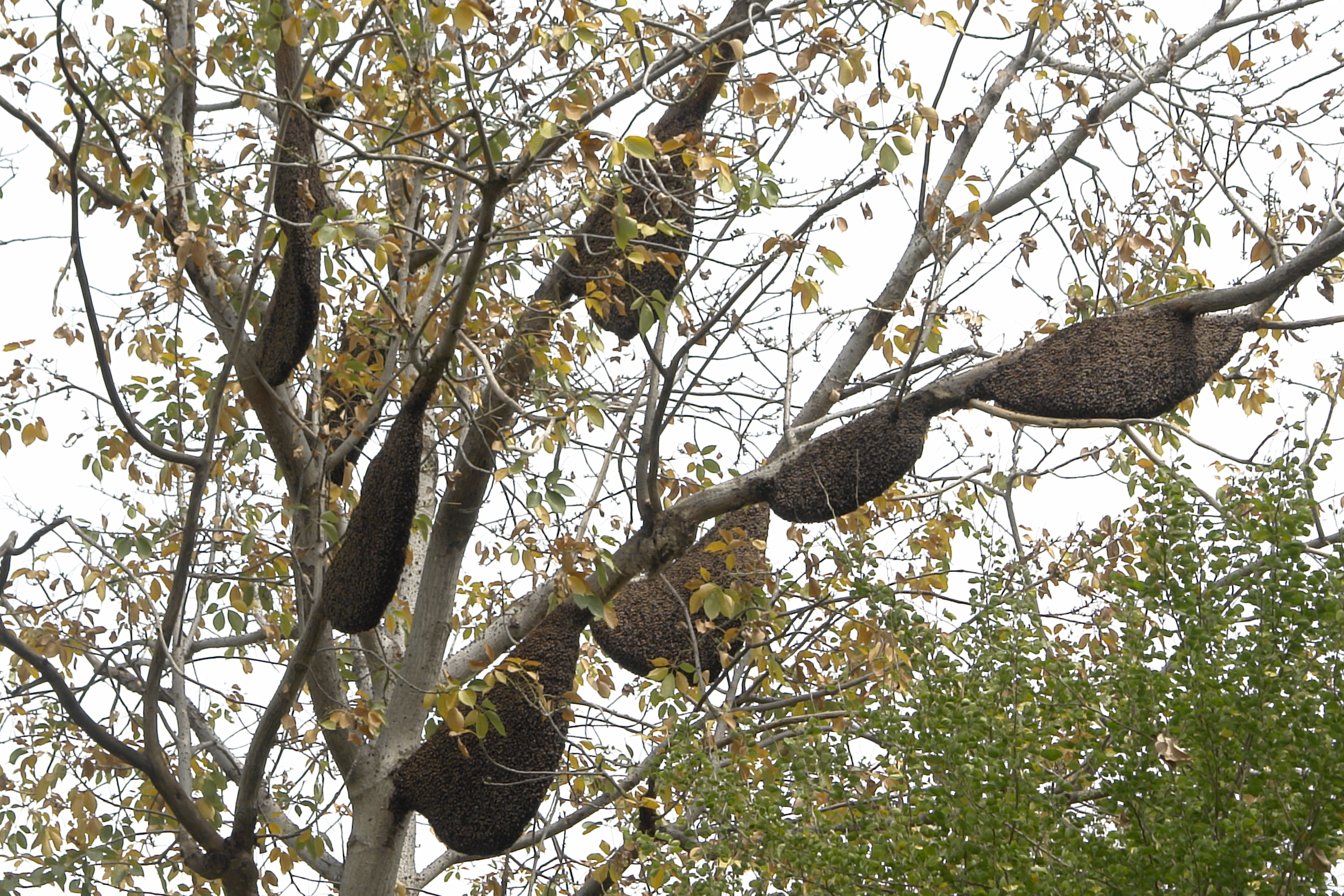
Bee swarms, Jaura
