= Morena district =

- District of Madhya Pradesh
- जिला मुरैना
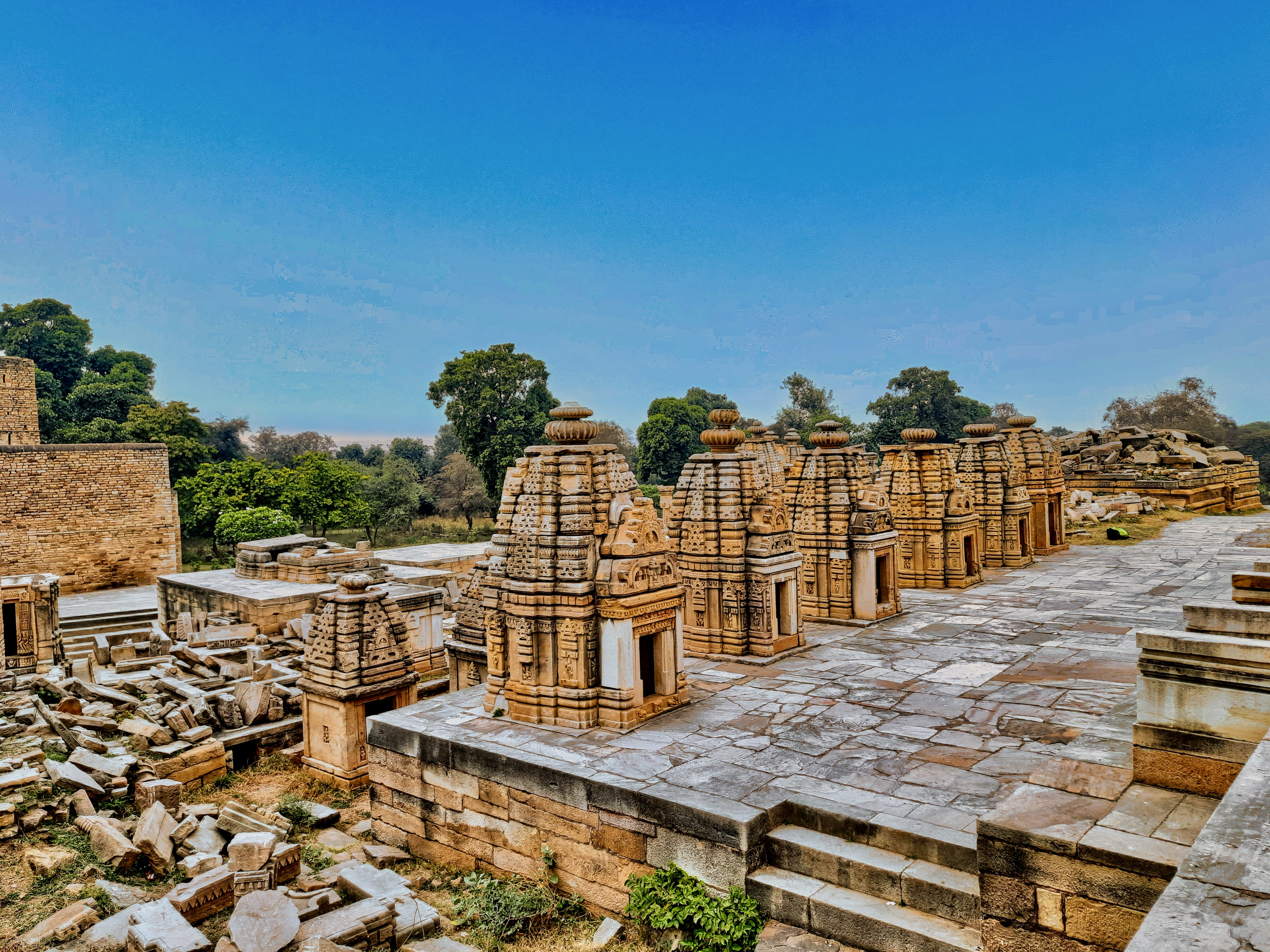
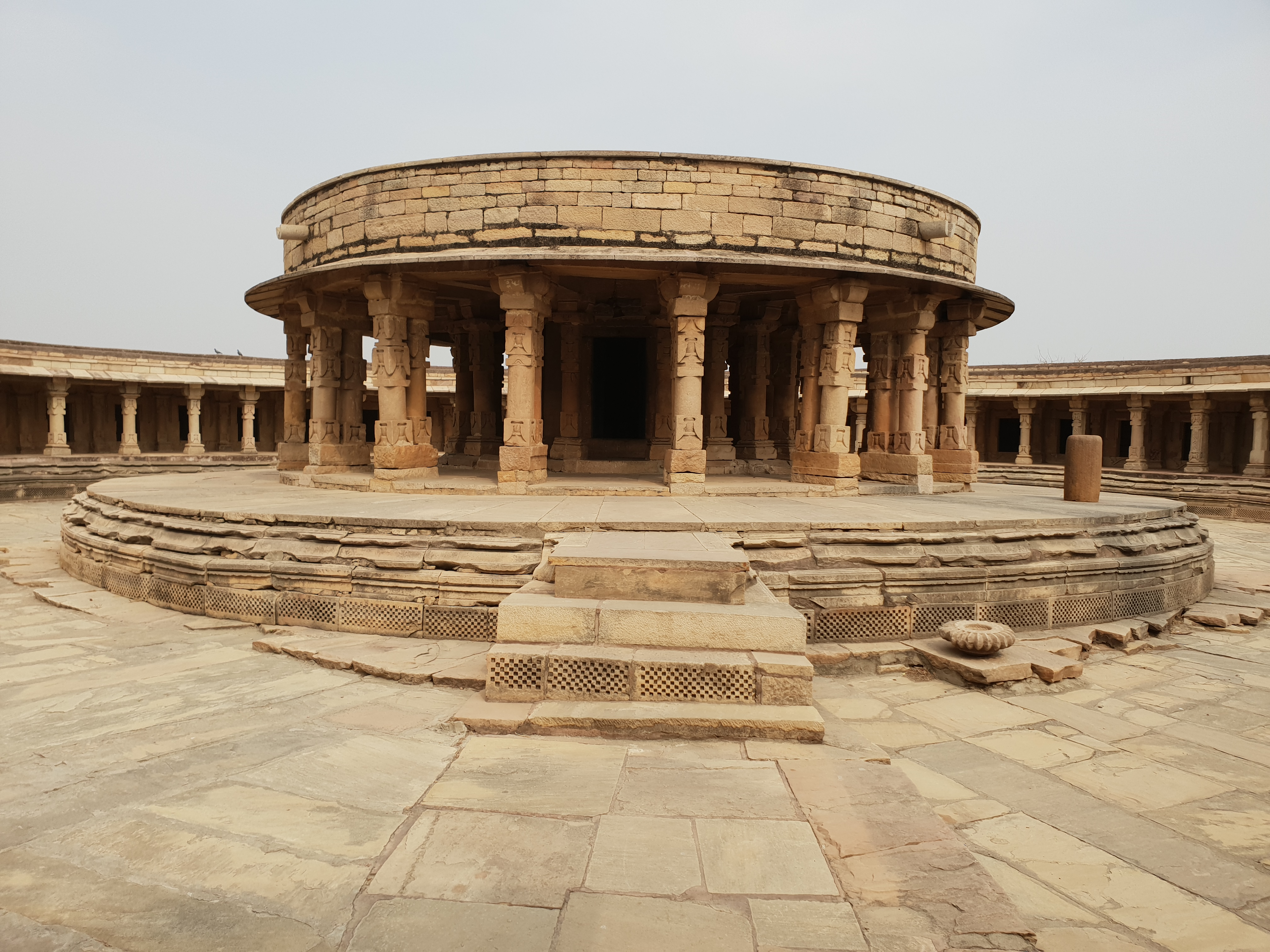
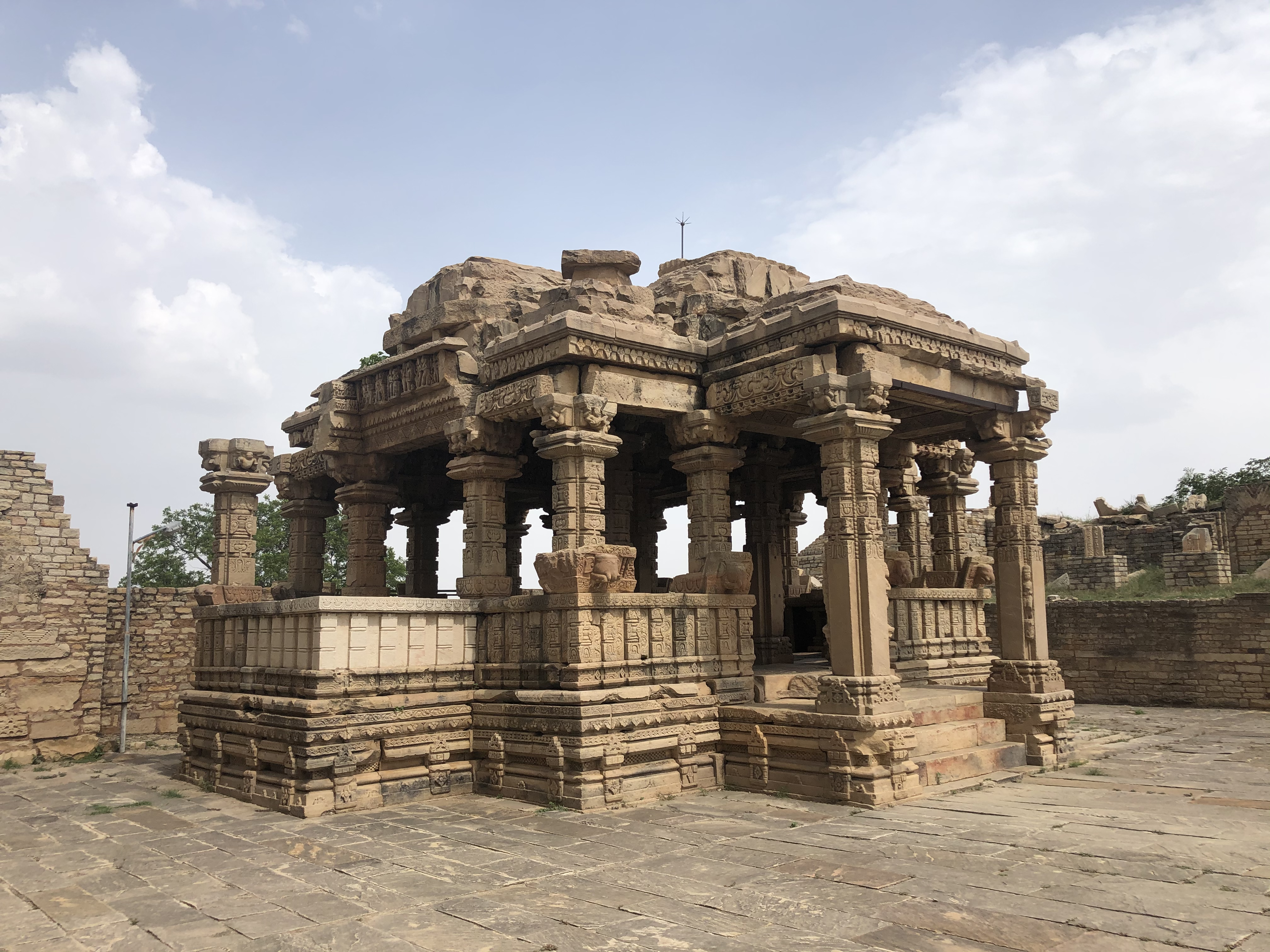
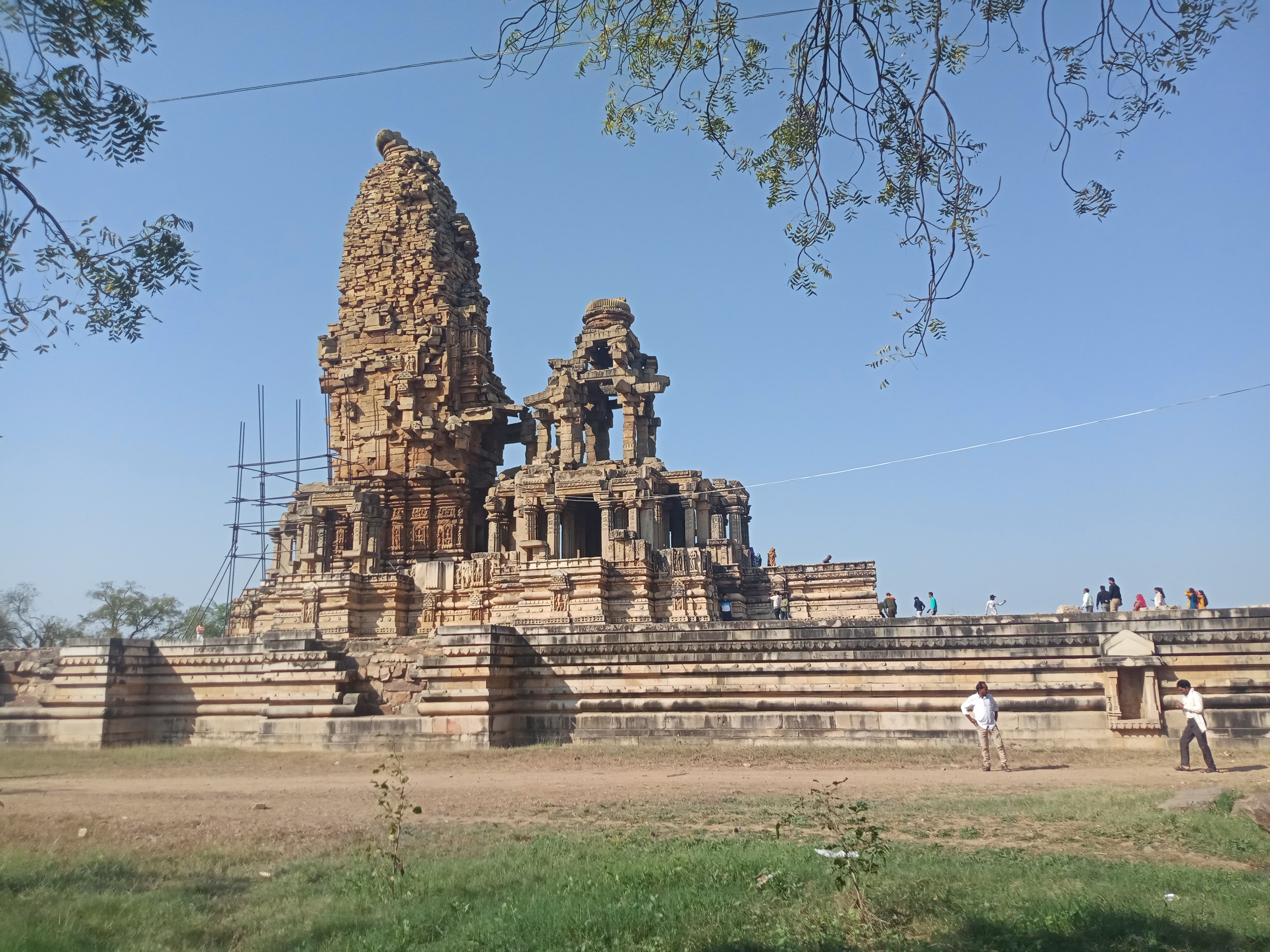
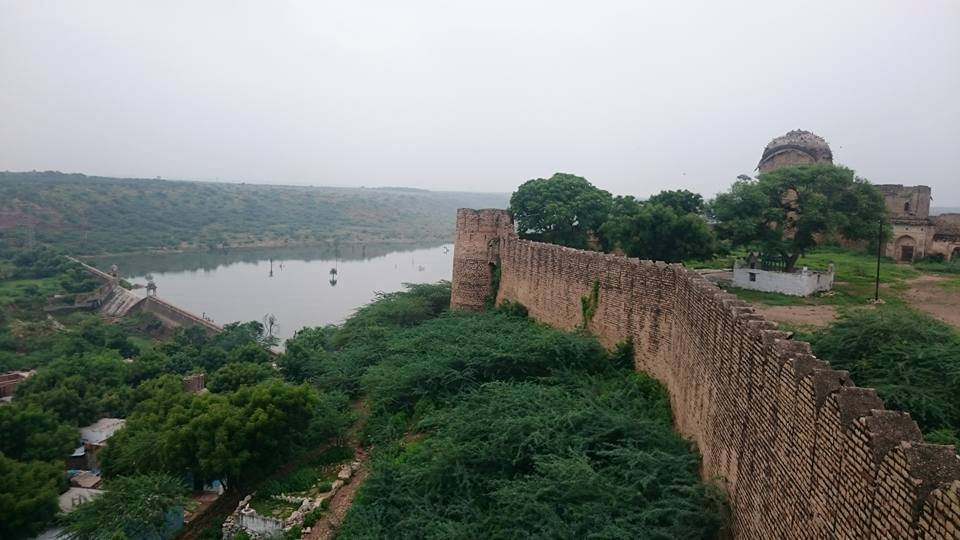
- Clockwise from top-left: Bateshwar Temples, Chausath Yogini Temple, Mitaoli, Kaknmath Temple, Sabalgarh Fort, Gadhi Padawali temple

- Location of Morena district in Madhya Pradesh
- Coordinates (Morena): 26.5°N 78.0°E
- Country: India
- State: Madhya Pradesh
- Division: Chambal
- Headquarters: Morena
- Tehsils: 1. Morena; 2. Ambah; 3. Porsa; 4. Joura; 5. Sabalgarh; 6. Kailaras; 7. Banmore

Government
  - Collector: Mr.Lokesh Jangid IAS
  - Lok Sabha constituencies: Morena (shared with Sheopur district)
  - Vidhan Sabha constituencies: 1. Sabalgarh, 2. Joura, 3. Sumawali, 4. Morena, 5. Dimani and 6. Ambah

Area
  - Total: 4,989 km^{2} (1,926 sq mi)

Population (2011)
  - Total: 1,965,970
  - Density: 394.1/km^{2} (1,021/sq mi)
  - Urban: 22.56

Demographics
  - Literacy: 72.1
  - Sex ratio: 839

Language
  - Official: Hindi
  - Dialect: Brajbhasha
- Time zone: UTC+05:30 (IST)
- Vehicle registration: MP-06
- Major highways: NH3
- National Highway: NH552
- Website: morena.nic.in

Morena district (Hindi pronunciation: [mʊɾɛːn̪aː]) is one of the 53 districts of the central Indian state of Madhya Pradesh, located in the Chambal division. The district headquarters is Morena.

== Geography ==
Morena is located at 26.5°N 78.0°E. It has an average elevation of 177 metres (580 feet). Its major rivers include the Chambal, Kwari, Asan, and Sank.

== Divisions ==
Morena district comprises four sub-divisions: Morena, Ambah, Joura and Sabalgarh. Morena sub-division comprises a lone tehsil and a lone block: Morena and Banmore.

Ambah sub-division comprises two tehsils and blocks: Ambah and Porsa. Joura sub-division comprises Joura tehsil, which is further divided into two blocks: Joura and Pahargarh. Sabalgarh sub-division has two tehsils and blocks: Sabalgarh and Kailaras.

== Government ==
The district has six Vidhan Sabha constituencies: Sabalgarh, Joura, Sumawali, Morena, Dimani and Ambah. All of these are part of Morena Lok Sabha constituency. All Assemblies are part of Morena Lok Sabha constituency.

Shivmangal Singh Tomar was elected to the Lok Sabha, the lower house of the Parliament of India from Morena, Madhya Pradesh in the 2024 Indian general election as member of the Bharatiya Janata Party.

== Demographics ==
Historical population
Year	Pop.	±% p.a.
1901	390,014	—
1911	384,516	−0.14%
1921	351,358	−0.90%
1931	385,721	+0.94%
1941	437,478	+1.27%
1951	482,474	+0.98%
1961	590,404	+2.04%
1971	742,350	+2.32%
1981	979,564	+2.81%
1991	1,279,094	+2.70%
2001	1,592,714	+2.22%
2011	1,965,970	+2.13%

According to the 2011 census, Morena District has a population of 1,965,970, roughly equal to the nation of Lesotho or the US state of New Mexico. This gives it a ranking of 236th in India (out of a total of 640). The district has a population density of 394 inhabitants per square kilometre (1,020/sq mi). Its population growth rate over the decade 2001-2011 was 23.38%.

Morena has a sex ratio of 839 females for every 1000 males, and a literacy rate of 72.07%. 23.93% of the population lives in urban areas. Scheduled Castes and Scheduled Tribes make up 21.44% and 0.87% of the population respectively.

Hindi is the predominant language, spoken by 99.81% of the population. The dialect of the region is Braj.

== Economy ==
Morena has agrarian and industrial economy. Banmore has a well developed Industrial area where many factories are functioning. From tyres to oil & spices to plastics, these industries are significant contributor to the economy of Morena.

Villages of Morena district has good availability of water. Canals, tubewells and borewells are irrigation sources. Major crops cultivated in Morena are wheat and Mustard.

In Banmore Industrial area many important manufacturing unit are operated like, JK Tyre.

== Transport ==
=== Road ===
Morena is connected by National Highway 3 (India) which connects Agra to Mumbai.

=== Rail ===
Morena railway station of North Central Railway zone lies on the main train line connecting Delhi and Mumbai. Several trains running from North to south have their stoppage in Morena.

Along with this Kailaras, Joura, Sumaoli, Sabalgarh have railway stations.

== Religion ==
Religions in Morena district (2011)
Religion	Percent
Hinduism	95.40%
Islam	3.87%
Other or not stated	0.73%

Hinduism is the majority religion in the district, followed by more than 95% of the total population and the district has many significant Hindu temples. Islam is the second most followed religion, with 3.9% of the population with Jainism and Buddhism making up small minorities. There is also a small minority of Christians and Sikhs in the region.

== Notable landmarks ==
- Kanakmath, Sihonia
- Bateshwar Mahadev Mandir
- Chausath Yogini Mandir, Mitawali
- National Chambal Sanctuary
- Sabalgarh Fort

== Notable residents ==
- Ram Prasad Bismil: Indian revolutionary
- Paan Singh Tomar, first an athlete in Bhidosa (Morena), seven times national champion in steeplechase, who represented India in Asian Games held in Japan, who later turned into an outlaw/ dacoit.
- Narendra Singh Tomar: Former union minister
- Shivmangal Singh Tomar, an Indian politician MP from Morena Lok Sabha
- V. D. Sharma, an Indian politician and Member of Parliament
