= Sundhiyamau =

Sundhiyamau Surihamau
- village
- Location in Uttar Pradesh, India Sundhiyamau (India)
- Coordinates: 27°07′31.16″N 81°17′53.05″E
- Country: India
- State: Uttar Pradesh
- District: Barabnki

Government
  - Body: Gram panchayat

Population
  - Total: 4,998

Languages
  - Official: Hindi, Urdu
- Time zone: UTC+5:30 (IST)
- PIN: 225305

Sundhiyamau is a census village & village panchayat in Tehsil Ramnagar of Barabanki district in the state of Uttar Pradesh, India.

== Geography ==
Sundhiyamau is located at 27°07′31.16″N 81°17′53.05″E

== Education ==
1. Government School

2. Madrasa

== Facilities ==
1. Fahed Computer & Printing Press Haji Madan Market Sundhiyamau Barabanki
