= Dariyabad =

Dariyabad may refer to:

- Dariyabad, Barabanki, Uttar Pradesh, India
- Dariyabad, Allahabad, Uttar Pradesh, India
- Dariyabad (Assembly constituency)
