= Mahadeva, Barabanki =

- Village
- Location in Uttar Pradesh, India
- Coordinates: 27°05′44″N 81°29′05″E
- Country: India
- State: Uttar Pradesh
- District: Barabanki

Languages
  - Official: Hindi
- Time zone: UTC+5:30 (IST)

Mahadeva is a village in tehsil Ram Nagar of Barabanki district on the banks of river Ghaghra.

Lodheshwar Mahadev Mandir an age-old temple of Shiva is located at the village. During the fair held on the occasion of Mahashivratri at Mahadeva millions of devotees throng the place.
