= Nawabganj, Barabanki =

Nawabganj, Barabanki Nawabganj
- City
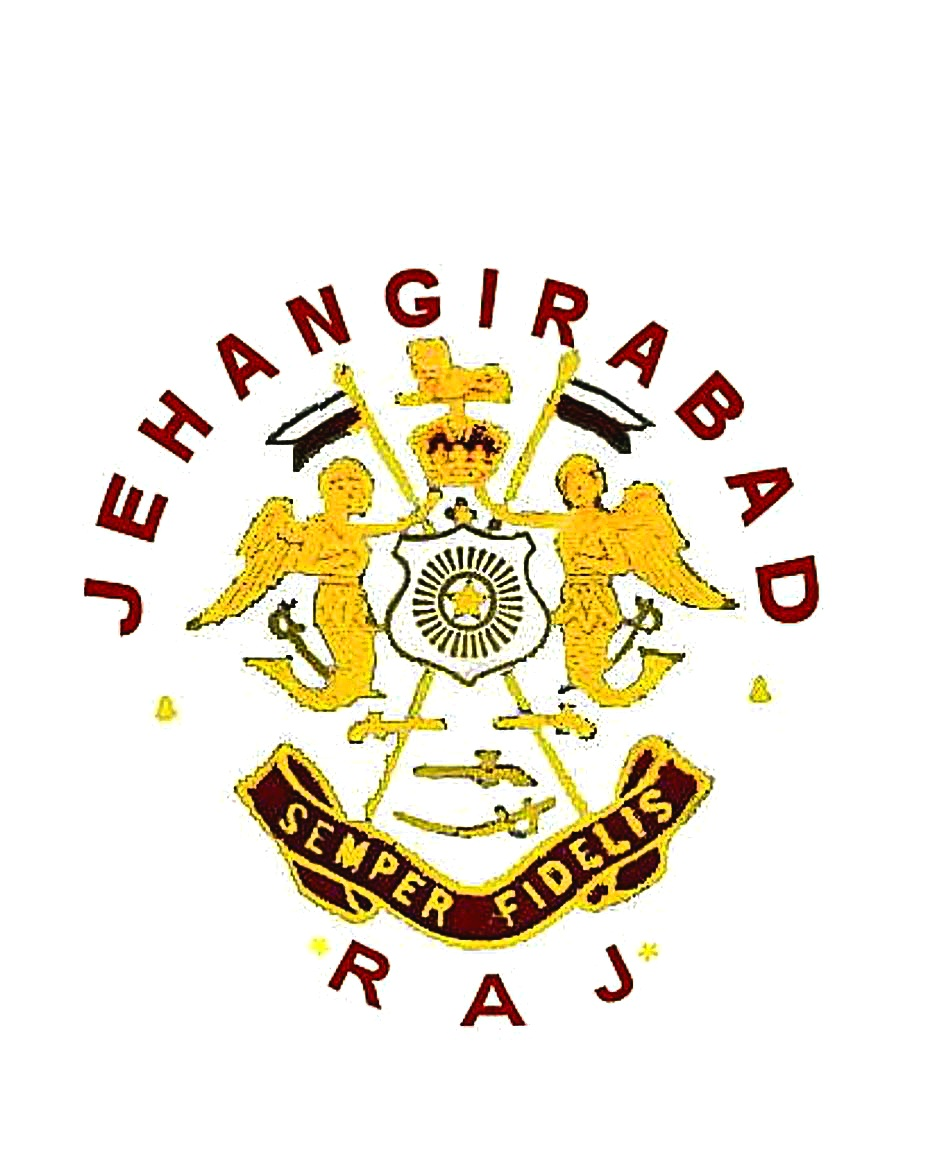
- COAT OF ARMS (COA)

- Location in Uttar Pradesh, India
- Coordinates: 26.94°N 81.19°E
- Country: India
- State: Uttar Pradesh
- District: Barabanki
- Jagir: AD 1756
- Founder: Raja Ghulam Amir Khan

Government
  - Type: Nagar palika
  - Chairman: Smt Sashi Srivastava
- Elevation: 100 m (330 ft)

Population (2001)
  - Total: 75,087

Languages
  - Official: Hindi, Urdu Awadhi
- Time zone: UTC+5:30 (IST)
- PIN: 225001
- Telephone code: 05248
- Vehicle registration: UP-41
- Website: nppnawabganj.in

Nawabganj or Maila Raiganj is a city in Barabanki district in the state of Uttar Pradesh, India. It is a tehsil and nagar palika for Barabanki town. It is one of the constituent entities of Barabanki city, which is District HQ of Barabanki district.

== History ==
Nawabganj has been known as such since the Nawabi. formerly known as Maila Raiganj The origin of this ta'aluqa dates from Qidwai Raja Ghulam Amir Khan, who, in AD 1756, received from Nawab of Awadh Shuja-ud-Daula as a Jagir he also fought Third Battle of Panipat under the Nawab of Awadh Shuja-ud-Daula.,

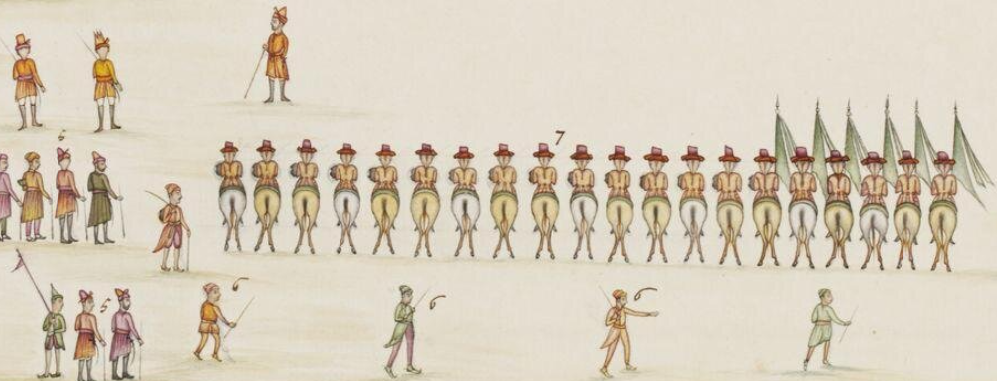
Camp of Shuja-ud-Daula of Awadh

The Qidwai were recruited in the household cavalry of Shuja-ud-Daula, which was mainly composed of the Sheikhzadi. the villages of Maila Raiganj, Rasoolpur, Bhainsaria, Durjanpur, etc. To these additions and improvements were made by a subsequent descendant, Raja Lutf Ali Khan of Maila Raiganj., later belongs to his son's Raja Sahib Ali Khan, Raja Mardan Ali Khan, Raja Farzand Ali Khan, Raja Haidar Ali Khan., Raja Sahib Ali Khan born in c. AD 1786 he was a Naib Subedar in the Reign of 5th Nawab of Awadh Saadat Ali Khan II and served until his death in 1855 in the Reign of Last Nawab of Oudh Wajid Ali Shah., after Sahib Ali's death his brother Haidar Ali Khan takeover his position title obtained the recognition of Government sanad, later Monarchy Collapsed in 1858 and he died c.1860., in the British India

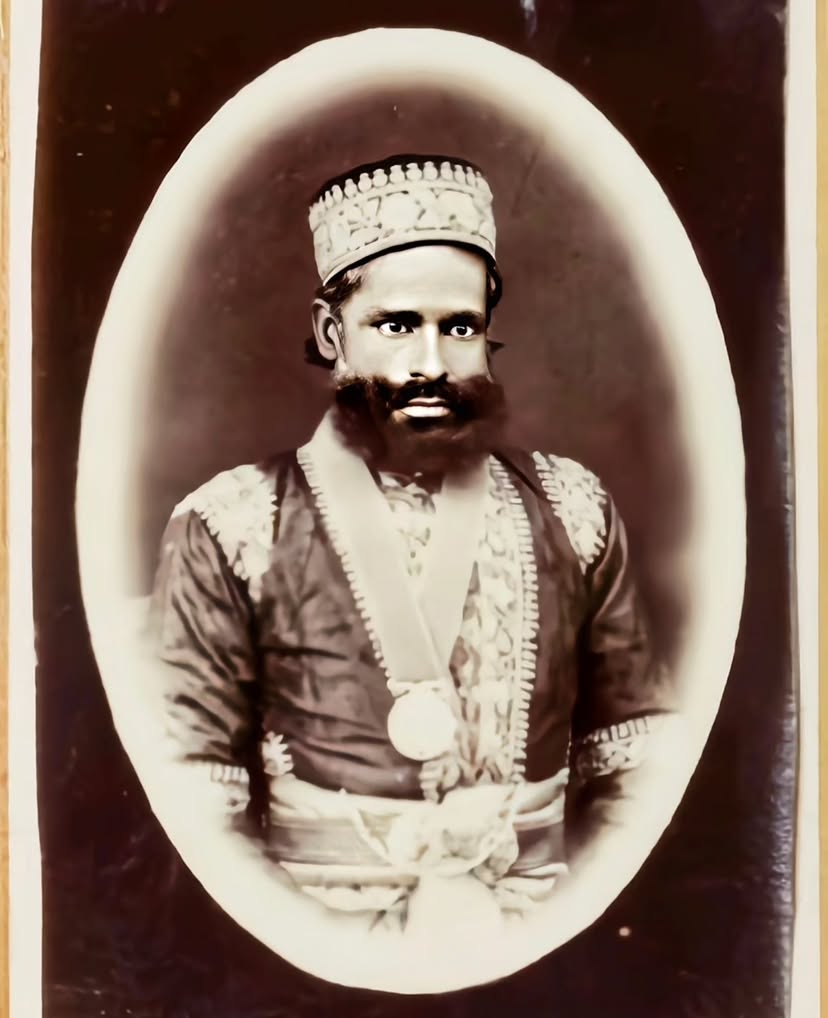
Raja Nawab Ali Khan Taluqdar of Maila Raiganj

Raja Nawab Ali Khan became Ta'alluqdar of Maila Raiganj Estate, in 1860., under the British Raj the Estate has 4 Villages and 9 Pattis in Zila Barabanki. Government Revenue, Rs. 6,268. The gaddi Custum of succession Holds in this Family., This ta'alluqdar is Nephew of Raja Farzand Ali Khan Ta'alluqdar of Jahangirabad Raj and son of Raja Mardan Ali Khan and elder brother of Raja Sir Tassaduq Rasul Khan.

=== Battle of Nawabganj ===
Battle of Nawabganj
- Part of the Indian Mutiny
Date	12–14 June 1857
Location	Nawabganj
Result	British victory

Belligerents
East India Company	rebel sepoys Oudh State; Local Taluqdars

Commanders and leaders
Sir Hope Grant	Maulvi Ahmadullah Shah; Raja Balbhadra Singh of Chahlari

Strength
5000	16000

Casualties and losses
36 killed 62 wounded	1000 killed and wounded

The Battle of Nawabganj was a conflict between rebel sepoys, troops of Oudh State and local Taluqdars and troops of East India Company from 12 to 14 June 1857 during Indian Mutiny.

During the Sepoy war of 1857–1858 the whole of the Bara Banki taluqdars joined the mutineers, but offered no serious resistance after the capture of Lucknow. In the battle of Nawabganj in 1857 at Nawabganj Sir Hope Grant defeated the revolutionaries. Raja Balbhadra Singh Chehlari along with other 1000 revolutionaries were killed in action while fighting British at Obri around 2 km from Barabanki on the confluence of riverlets Rait and Jamuria.

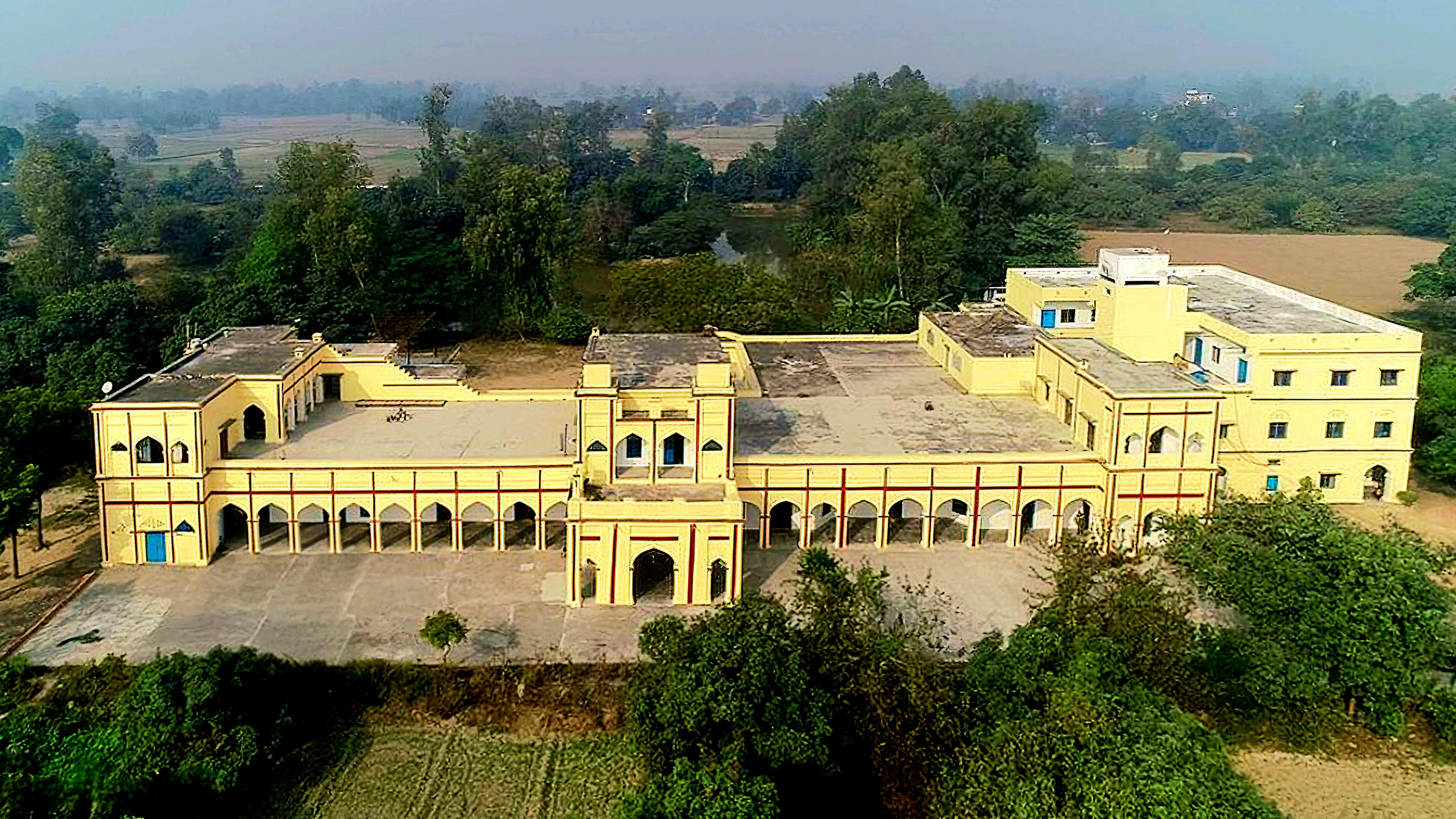
Rani Rasoolpur Palace, Nawabganj

=== British Rule ===
During the British rule Nawabganj headquarters of tehsil and pargana of same name. Area of Nawabganj Pargana around 1878 was 79 square miles and it was bounded in North by Ramnagar and Fatehpur, on the east by Daryabad, on the west by Dewa, and on south by Partabganj. Out of 77 villages, 44 were taluqdar and 33 Mufrad. Out of 44 taluqdari villages 25 were held by

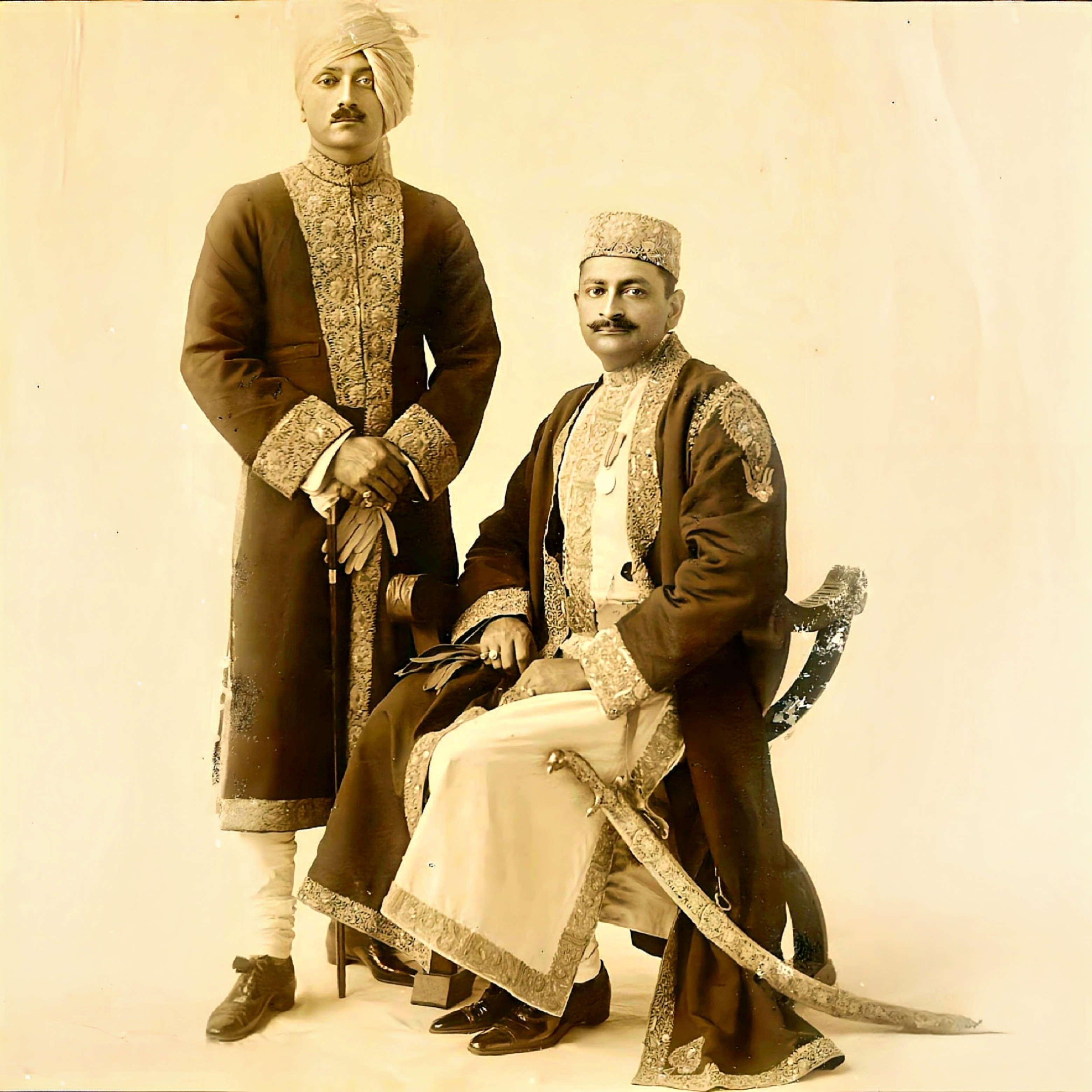
Raja Imtiaz Rasul Khan of Rasoolpur,Nawabganj, with elder brother Maharaja Sir Ejaz Rasul Khan of Jahangirabad Raj seated

Raja Capt. Imtiaz Rasul Khan of Rasoolpur, Nawabganj son of Raja Fida Rasul Khan and younger brother of Maharaja Sir Ejaz Rasul Khan K.C.I.E., Kt., C.S.I., the Taluqdar of Jehangirabad Estate, the rest were divided between several neighbouring estates. Nawabganj contained village of Bara Banki which had civil railway station having junction on Oudh and Rohilkhand Railway (about half a mile north of the town).

== Geography ==
Nawabganj is located at 26.94°N 81.19°E. It has an average elevation of 93 metres (305 feet).

== Demographics ==
As of 2001 India census, Nawabganj had a population of 75,087. Males constitute 52% of the population and females 48%. Nawabganj has an average literacy rate of 66%, higher than the national average of 59.5%: male literacy is 70%, and female literacy is 62%. In Nawabganj, 12% of the population is under 6 years of age.

== Administration ==
=== Tehsil Nawabganj ===
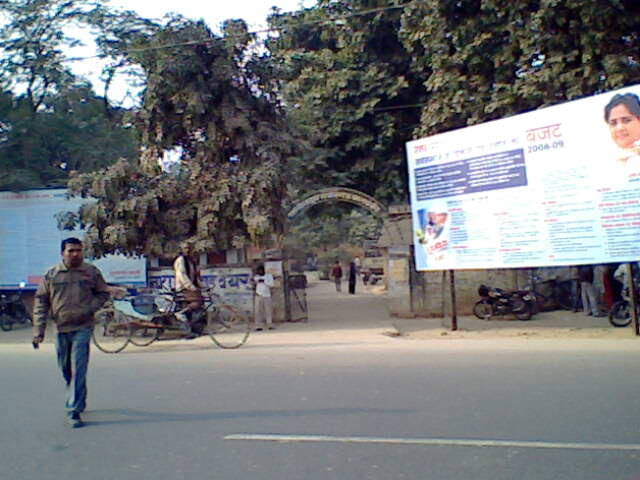
Nawabganj tehsildar office, Barabanki

Tehsil Nawabganj has 4 block panchayats:

1. Banki
2. Dewa
3. Harakh
4. Masauli

=== Municipal Board Nawabganj ===
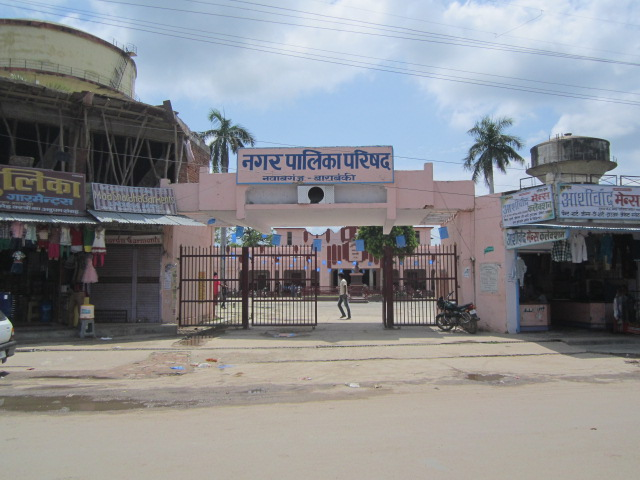
Nagar Parishad Nawabganj building, Barabanki.

The Nawabganj Municipal Board (or Nagar Palika Parishad Nawabganj) was constituted on 16 July 1884, under the North-Western provinces and Oudh Municipalities Act, 1883. According to census of 2001 Nagar Palika Parishad Nawabganj covers an area of 12 km^{2} with population of 75,741. It consists of seven sections for providing civic amenities to its citizens, they are:

1. Revenue Section
2. Public Works Section
3. Health & Sanitation Section
4. Water Works
5. Street Light
6. Nazul
7. Accounts, Establishment & Records

Nagar Palika Parishad Nawabganj has 25 wards. They are:

Ward No.	Name	Population (2001)
1	Gandhi Nagar	3148
2	Valmiki Nagar	5309
3	Peer Batawan Saravgi	1913
4	Begumganj Saravgi	3060
5	Kanoongoyan Poorvi	3000
6	Poorvi Peerbatawan	3180
7	Police Line	2259
8	Lajpat Nagar	2216
9	Gularia Gaarda	2782
10	Azad Nagar	3208
11	Kanoongoyan	2574
12	Tehsil Colony	2948
13	Katra Baradari	2969
14	Satypremi Nagar	2103
15	Kailash Ashram	3412
16	Durgapuri	3788
17	Nehru Nagar	2680
18	Munshiganj	1882
19	Bheetri Peerbatawan	4526
20	Barhiyan Tola	3174
21	Barhiyan Pashchimi	3253
22	Dushehrabagh	4603
23	Bheetri Poorvi	3424
24	Saravgi	1489
25	Rasoolpur	2591
