= Fatehpur, Barabanki =

Fatehpur, Barabanki Fatehpur
- Town
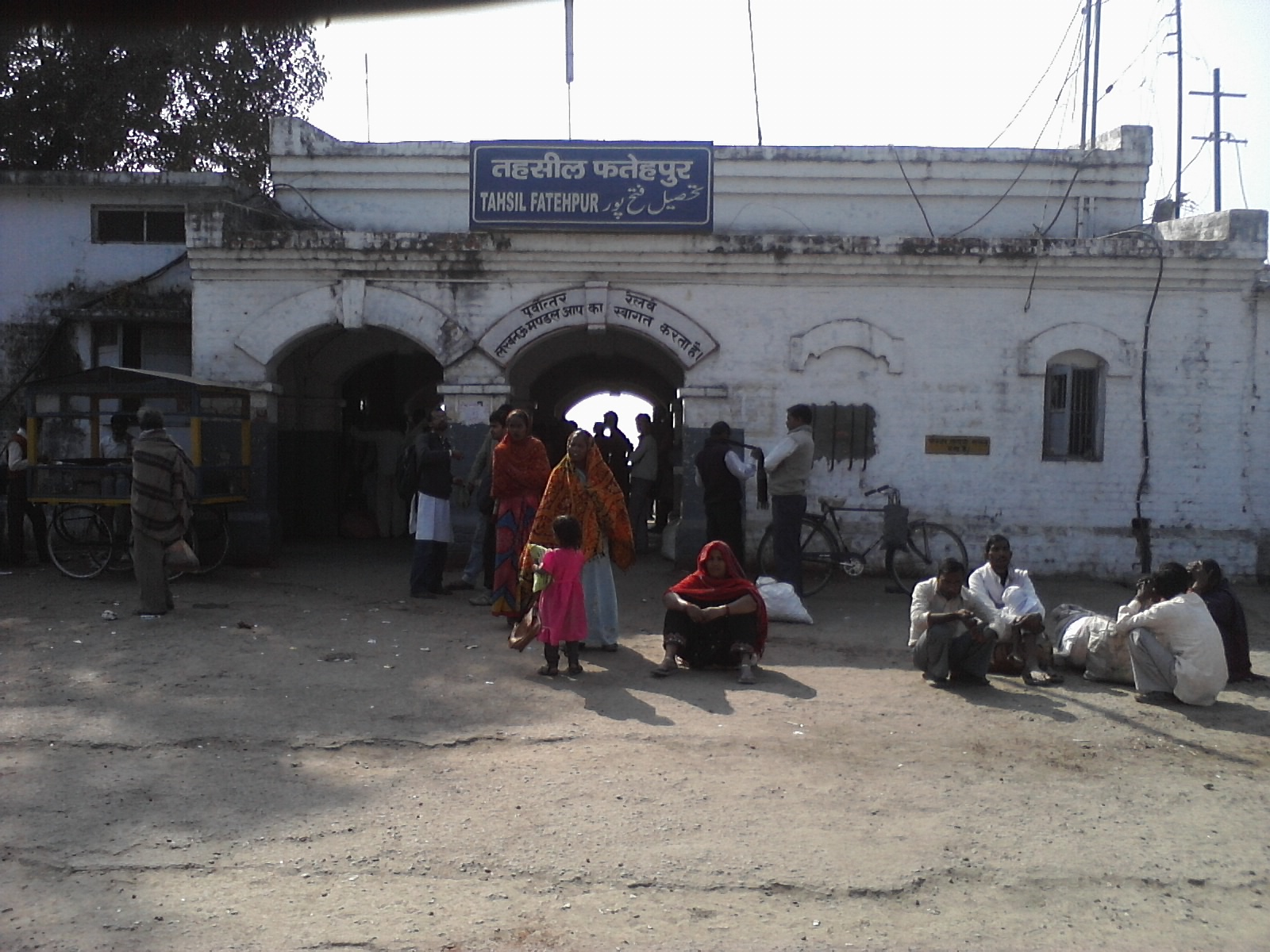
- Tehsil Fatehpur railway station

- Location in Uttar Pradesh, India Fatehpur, Barabanki (India)
- Coordinates: 27.17°N 81.22°E
- Country: India
- State: Uttar Pradesh
- District: Barabanki

Government
  - Type: Nagar panchayat
  - Chairman: Irshad Ahmed Qamar
- Elevation: 140 m (460 ft)

Population (2001)
  - Total: 35,582

Language
  - Official: Hindi
  - Additional official: Urdu
- Time zone: UTC+5:30 (IST)
- PIN: 225305
- Telephone code: 05240
- Vehicle registration: UP-41
- Sex ratio: 50/48 ♂/♀
- Website: www.fatehpurnp.in

Fatehpur is a town in Barabanki district in the state of Uttar Pradesh in India. It is also a Nagar panchayat, Police station and Tehsil. It is the second biggest urban area of the district after Barabanki city. It is about 35 km north-east of Lucknow, the state capital.

== Geography ==
Fatehpur is located at 27.17°N 81.22°E. It has an average elevation of 140 metres (460 feet).

== Demographics ==
As of 2011 India census, Fatehpur (NP) had a population of 35,582, of which males were 18,649 and females 16,933. Population within the age group of 0 to 6 years was 4,963. The total number of literates in Fatehpur was 20,956, which constituted 58.9% of the population with male literacy of 61.6% and female literacy of 55.9%. The effective literacy rate of 7+ population of Barabanki was 68.4%, of which male literacy rate was 71.6% and female literacy rate was 65.1%. The Scheduled Caste population was 1,767 and the total number of households was 5617.

=== Languages ===
Hindi is the official language of Fatehpur while Urdu serves as the additional official language.

== Government and politics ==
=== Administration ===
Fatehpur tehsil has three Block Panchayats, they are:

1. Fatehpur
2. Nindura
3. Suratganj

==== Block Panchayat Fatehpur ====
Block Panchayat Fatehpur has 86 Village Panchayats, they are

Achaicha	Asohana	Aurangabad	Banar	Banni Sulemabad
Basantpur	Basara	Batiya	Belhara	Bhagauli
Bhaisuriya Mujahidpur	Bhatuamau	Bihura	Bilauli Mahraj	Bilauli Hazratpur
Bishunpur	Devkhariya	Dhadhsi	Dhamsadh	Dhausar
Fatehpur Dehat	Gang Gaula	Gangchauli	Gangemau	Gaura Gajni
Gaura Karaundi	Gaura Sailak	Gauri Baniyani	Gheri	Gudauli
Gursel	Haiderganj	Hasanpur Tanda	Hazratpur	Ishepur
Israuli	Jagsenda	Jarkha	Kaitha	Kandraula
Katghara	Khaira	Khapurwa Khanpur	Kiratpur	Kuan Danda
Kutbapur	Kutlupur	Madanpur	Majhgawan Sharif	Mawaiya
Meernagar	Mithwara	Mohammadipur	Mohammadpur Khala	Mundera
Munderi	Naandkui	Naktauli	Nandna Kala	Nandrasi
Pakariyapur	Patna	Rahilamau	Ralbhari	Rariya
Rasool Panah	Rasoolpur	Rauja	Sadhemau	Sadrapur
Safipur	Saili Kiratpur	Salempur	Sandupur	Saraiya Matbar Nagar
Sarwa	Sauranga	Shahpur	Sihali	Taalgaon
Tadwa Gadmanpur	Tadwa Naankari	Tanda Nizam Ali	Terhwa	Tikapur
Ujarwara

=== Utilities ===
==== Health services ====
Tehsil Fatehpur has five Health centres, three Primary health centres and seven Sub-centres.

==== Energy park programme ====
Fatehpur was identified in 2006 as an area for development under the Non-Conventional Energy program of the Non-Conventional Energy Development Agency (Neda).

== Transportation ==
=== By road ===
Fatehpur has connectivity to Lucknow, Barabanki, Mahmoodabad, Ramnagar, Dewa, Suratganj, Hetmapur, Rampur Mathura, Lalpur Karauta. It has regular bus service from Lucknow and Barabanki.

=== By rail ===
Tehsil Fatehpur railway station is two kilometres away from the town area, block development office (BDO), and Munshiganj. It is located on Burhwal-Sitapur chord section of North Eastern Railway (NER) zone which connects directly to Delhi, Punjab and Jammu via Shahjahanpur, Rampur, Moradabad and has one platform with three running lines including one main line with interlocking signaling system.
