= Elgin Bridge =

Elgin Bridge may refer to:

- Elgin Bridge (Singapore)
- Elgin Bridge (Barabanki), in India
