= Dariyabad Assembly constituency =

Constituency of the Uttar Pradesh legislative assembly in India

Coordinates: 26.89°N 81.56°E

Dariyabad
- Constituency No. 270 for the Uttar Pradesh Legislative Assembly

Constituency details
- Country: India
- Region: North India
- State: Uttar Pradesh
- District: Barabanki
- Total electors: 4,12,472
- Reservation: None

Member of Legislative Assembly
- 18th Uttar Pradesh Legislative Assembly
- Incumbent Satish Chandra Sharma
- Party: Bharatiya Janata Party
- Elected year: 2022

Dariyabad is a constituency of the Uttar Pradesh Legislative Assembly covering the town of Dariyabad in the Barabanki district of Uttar Pradesh, India. Dariyabad is one of five assembly constituencies in the Ayodhya Lok Sabha constituency. Since 2008, this assembly constituency is numbered 270 amongst 403 constituencies.

== Members of the Legislative Assembly ==
Year	Member	Party
1985	Rajiv Kumar Singh	Samajwadi Party
1989	Rajiv Kumar Singh	Samajwadi Party
1991	Radhey Shyam	Janata Party
1993	Radhey Shyam	Samajwadi Party
1996	Rajiv Kumar Singh	Bharatiya Janata Party
2002	Rajiv Kumar Singh	Bharatiya Janata Party
2007	Rajiv Kumar Singh	Samajwadi Party
2012	Rajiv Kumar Singh	Samajwadi Party
2017	Satish Chandra Sharma	Bharatiya Janata Party
2022	Satish Chandra Sharma	Bharatiya Janata Party

== Results ==
=== 2027 ===
2027 Uttar Pradesh Legislative Assembly election: Dariyabad
Party	Candidate	Votes	%	±%
INDIA				
NDA				
BSP				
NOTA	None of the above			
Majority				
Turnout				
gain from		Swing		

=== 2022 ===
2022 Uttar Pradesh Legislative Assembly election: Dariyabad
Party	Candidate	Votes	%	±%
BJP	Satish Chandra Sharma	128,219	46.87	+0.06
SP	Arvind Kumar Singh Gope	95,817	35.03	+8.13
BSP	Jagprasad Rawat	28,361	10.37	−11.04
Independent	Ritesh Kumar Singh	9,378	3.43	
AIMIM	Mubashshir Ahmad	2,642	0.97	
NOTA	None of the above	2,363	0.86	−0.34
Majority		32,402	11.84	−8.07
Turnout		273,557	66.32	+0.62
BJP hold		Swing		

=== 2017 ===
2017 Uttar Pradesh Legislative Assembly election: Dariyabad
Party	Candidate	Votes	%	±%
BJP	Satish Chandra Sharma	119,173	46.81	
SP	Rajeev Kumar Singh	68,487	26.9	
BSP	Mohd Mubassir	54,512	21.41	
NOTA	None of the above	3,013	1.2	
Majority		50,686	19.91	
Turnout		254,570	65.7	
BJP hold		Swing		

== See also ==
- Dariyabad (disambiguation)
