= Lodheshwar Mahadev Mandir =

Hindu Temple in Uttar Pradesh, India

Lodheshwar Mahadev Temple
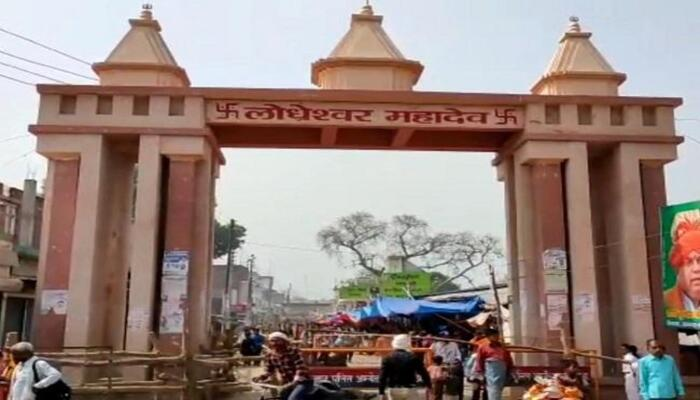

- Location within Uttar Pradesh, India

Religion
- Affiliation: Hinduism
- District: Barabanki
- Deity: Shiva
- Festival: Maha Shivaratri

Location
- Location: Ramnagar
- State: Uttar Pradesh
- Country: India
- Interactive map of Lodheshwar Mahadev Temple
- Coordinates: 27°05′44″N 81°29′05″E

Architecture
- Type: Hindu temple architecture

Lodheshwar Mahadev Temple is a Hindu temple of Shiva, located in village Mahadeva, Ram Nagar tehsil in Barabanki district, Uttar Pradesh, India. The deity of Shivling worshiped in this temple is one of the rarest of the 52 Shivlings found on the Shakti Pithas across India. This ancient temple has been mentioned several times in Mahabharat. Lodheshwar Mahadev is Kuldevta of Lodhi Rajputs. Its importance has been mentioned in many Hindu scriptures and holy books. This shakti peetha is considered to be one of the most sacred places on earth.

== Location ==
It is a Shiva temple which is situated at village Mahadeva in tehsil Ram Nagar of district Barabanki on the banks of Ghaghra.

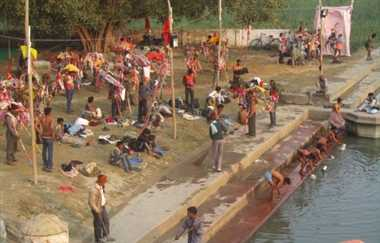
Holy Pond at Lodheshwar Mahadeva (Barabanki)

== History ==
There are several instances in Mahabharata where this ancient temple is referred to. Pandav after the Mahabharata had performed the Mahayagya at this place, a well exists even today by the name Pandav-Kup. It is said in the vedas that the water of the well is having spiritual qualities and those who drink this water get cured of a number of ailments. When Parshurama was cleansing the earth of kshatriyas, the surviving lodhis went to their Kuldevta Lodheshwar Mahadev to help them. He then asked them to drop their weapons thus their warrior lineage and pick up agricultural tools. Hence, many of them were the large landowners and zamindars till to date.

== Fair ==
There are two fairs held at Mahadeva:

- Fair in the Month of March–April: During this fair, held on the occasion of Mahashivratri at Mahadeva millions of devotees throng the place.
- Local Fair: This fair is held in November–December. This is fair for local peoples. A large number of cattle's are sold / bought in this fair.

== Procession ==
Walking pilgrims with Kanwar of district Kanpur, Banda, Jalaun and Hamirpur worship with Ganges water of Shiva at Lodheshwar Mahadeva
