= Pasiyahi Kala =

- Village
- Location in Uttar Pradesh, India Pasiyahi Kala (India)
- Coordinates: 25.5631492°N 82.7246698°E
- Country: India
- State: Uttar Pradesh
- District: Jaunpur

Government
  - Body: Gram panchayat

Area
  - Total: 2 km^{2} (0.77 sq mi)
- Elevation: 87 m (285 ft)

Population (2001)
  - Total: 2,512
  - Density: 1,300/km^{2} (3,300/sq mi)

Languages
  - Official: Hindi
- Time zone: UTC+5:30 (IST)
- Postal code: 222136—
- Vehicle registration: UP-62

Pasiyahi Kala is a village in Ram Nagar Block in Jaunpur District of Uttar Pradesh state, India. It belongs to Varanasi Division. It is located 25 kilometres (16 mi) south of the district headquarters at Jaunpur, 14 kilometres (8.7 mi) from Ram Nagar, and 267 kilometres (166 mi) from the state capital at Lucknow. The Postal Head office Jalalpur and B.o Pasiyahi Khurd.

Gram Pradhan = Santraj Yadav

Former Gram Pradhan = Late Mata Prasad Yadav

Late Birabal Yadav

Vinod Kumar Yadav

Usha Yadav

Neera Yadav

Rajesh Kumar Yadav
