= Baijnath Kureel =

Indian politician

Member of Parliament, Lok Sabha
- In office 1952-1977
- Constituency: Ramsanehighat, Uttar Pradesh

Personal details
- Born: 15 December 1920 Raebareli (Lalla khera)
- Died: 26 January 1984 (aged 63) Lucknow
- Party: Indian National Congress
- Spouse: late Smt Shanti Kureel
- Children: Late Shri Ramesh Chandra; Shri Suresh Chandra; Shri Kamlesh Chandra; Late Smt Pushpa Kureel; Smt Suman Vyas; Smt Sushma Karan

Baijnath Kureel (1920-1984) was an Indian politician, freedom fighter. He was the first Member of parliament from Raebareli then later he was elected from the Ramsanehighat in Uttar Pradesh to the Lower House of the Indian Parliament the Lok Sabha. He was elected total 5 times as Member of Parliament. He was a deputy minister of Power and Irrigation in the Union Government.
