= Elgin Bridge (Barabanki) =

- Coordinates: 27°05′53″N 81°28′50″E
- Carries: Railways
- Crosses: Confluence of Ghaghara River & Sharda River
- Locale: Barabanki district
- Official name: Elgin Bridge

Characteristics
- Total length: 3,695 feet (1,126 m)

History
- Construction start: 1894
- Construction end: 1896
- Opened: 18 December 1896 in Meter Gauge; Re-open on 1990 in Broad Gauge

Statistics
- Daily traffic: Lucknow - Gorakhpur Railway Mainline

Elgin Bridge is a 3,695 feet (1,126 m) long railway bridge across the Ghaghra River located in Barabanki district. The bridge falls on the Barabanki-Gonda section of the North Eastern Railway zone of Indian Railways. The bridge is about 72 kilometres (45 mi) from Lucknow and stands at periodically changing confluence of two rivers i.e. Sharda River and Ghaghara River. The bridge was built on dry land and then the river was trained under it.

== History & Details ==
The bridge construction started in 1894 & was completed in 1896. It was opened on 18 December 1896 having Meter Gauge track with the opening of Jarwal Road - Behramghat section of the Bengal and North Western Railway. The bridge is named after Lord Elgin, Governor-General of India (21 March 1862 – 20 November 1863). Before construction of Elgin Bridge and opening of railways between Gonda and Barabanki most of the trade was done by the river route, once the bridge was constructed the river trade decreased greatly. The bridge was closed for gauge conversion in 1987/88 and was later re-opened in 1989/90 with broad gauge track. Another bridge was constructed and opened parallel to the Elgin Bridge on 2010/11 during the doubling of the Lucknow - Gorakhpur railway mainline.

== Importance ==
The bridge is an important point of experiment, research and monitoring for irrigation and flood related activities. There is a flood water level recording and forecasting station at the Elgin Bridge which records rise and fall in the Ghaghra River. Tehsil Ram Sanehi Ghat is threatened as soon as water crosses 347 ft mark at the Elgin Bridge.

== Elgin-Charsari embankment ==
The Elgin-Charsari embankment is on the border of Barabanki district with Gonda district in Uttar Pradesh. The Elgin Charsari embankment runs along the river Ghagra in Barabanki and Gonda districts. The embankment is 52 km long, it starts from Elgin Bridge at Barabanki to Charsari village which is in Gonda district. When the embankment breaches several villages of district Barabanki and district Gonda are affected badly. In 2010 the embankment faced breach at kilometer 15 in front of Parsawal village and due to breach approximately 150 villages and 2.5 lakhs people were affected in district Barabanki and Gonda.
