= Sirauli Ghauspur =

- Town
- Location in Uttar Pradesh, India Sirauli Ghauspur (India)
- Coordinates: 26.95°N 81.43°E
- Country: India
- State: Uttar Pradesh
- District: Barabanki

Government
  - Type: Nagar panchayat
- Elevation: 110 m (360 ft)

Population (2011)
  - Total: 25,567

Language
  - Official: Hindi
- Time zone: UTC+5:30 (IST)
- PIN: 05241
- Vehicle registration: UP-41
- Website: barabanki.nic.in/tehsil/

Sirauli Ghauspur is a town in Barabanki district in the state of Uttar Pradesh, India. It is a Tehsil, Development Block and Nagar Panchayat.

== Geography ==
Siruli ghauspur is a village panchayat located in Barabanki district of Uttar Pradesh, state in India. The latitude 26.95 and longitude 81.43 are the geocoordinate of the Sirauli Ghauspur.

== Religion ==
Sirauli Ghauspur
Religion	Percent
Hinduism	70.30%
Islam	29.34%
Christianity	0.09%
Jainism	0.1%
Sikhism	0.05%
Other Religions	0.03%

According to the 2011 Census, the largest religious groupings are Hindus (70.30 per cent), followed by Muslims (29.34 per cent), Jains (0.10 per cent), Sikhs (0.05 per cent), and adherents of other religions (0.03 per cent).

== Language ==
Sirauli Ghauspur is Hindi, Urdu and most of the village people speak Hindi, Urdu. Sirauli Gauspur people use Hindi, Urdu language for communication.
