= Ram Sanehi Ghat =

Town in Uttar Pradesh, India

- City
- Location in Uttar Pradesh, India Ram Sanehi Ghat (India)
- Coordinates: 26.807°N 81.526°E
- Country: India
- State: Uttar Pradesh
- District: Barabanki

Government
  - Type: Nagar Panchayat
- Elevation: 110 m (360 ft)

Population (2001)
  - Total: 26,488

Languages
  - Official: Hindi, Urdu
- Time zone: UTC+5:30 (IST)
- PIN: 225409
- Telephone code: 05241
- Vehicle registration: UP-41
- Website: up.gov.in

Ram Sanehi Ghat is a city in Barabanki district in the state of Uttar Pradesh, India. It is a Tehsil and Police station(Thana).

== Geography ==
Ram Sanehi Ghat is located at 26.80°N 81.55°E^{,}. It has an average elevation of 110 metres (360 feet).

There is a flood recording station at the Elgin Bridge which records rise and fall in the Ghaghra River. Tehsil Ram Sanehi Ghat is threatened as soon as water crosses 347 ft mark at the Elgin Bridge.

== Demographics ==
As of the 2001 Census of India, Ram Sanehi Ghat had a population of 264,88. Males constitute 53% of the population and females 47%. Ram Sanehi Ghat has an average literacy rate of 52%, lower than the national average of 59.5%: male literacy is 56%, and female literacy is 47%. In Ram Sanehi Ghat, 17% of the population is under six years of age.

Religions in Ram sanehi ghat
Religion	Percent
Hindus	50%
Muslims	49%
Jains	0.5%
Others†	0.5%
Distribution of religions †Includes Sikhs (0.2%), Buddhists (<0.2%).

== Illegal structure demolition ==
On 17 May, an illegal structure was demolished in congruence of a Allahabad High Court ruling which stated that buildings in the state can be demolished, but state will try to go slow until 31 May. Also, order of Allahabad High Court dated 16 March 2021 stated that the illegal structure, which was alleged to be a Mosque, was situated on public land and the property was vested in State. After the order of the Lucknow Bench of the Allahabad High Court, the Mosque Management Committee was given 15 days to prove their title, wherein the Mosque Management Committee failed. In response to that, the proceedings under S.133 CrPC were initiated by the Joint Magistrate after recommendation of the Local Police, which was under tremendous pressure being outnumbered of the illegal gathering of people of a particular faith who were adamant to save the illegal structure. Notice for the proceedings under S.133 CrPC were served to the Management Committee, the members of which, after getting hint of such proceedings, abandoned the site and left to the neighbouring State of Bihar. On investigation, the District Magistrate found that the illegal structure/ Mosque was registered on false pretext under Wakf Act without any adherence to statutory formalities. Nevertheless, to upraise the anti- national sentiment, it was described by The Guardian as "one of the most inflammatory actions taken against a Muslim place of worship since the demolition of the Babri Mosque by a mob of Hindu nationalist rioters in 1992". It has been confirmed that actions are being taken against The Guardian and The Wire for abatement and uprising anti-national sentiment and for the breach of public peace and safety under relevant laws. Additionally, when investigation was carried out by the Officers of the State of Uttar Pradesh including the then Joint Magistrate/ SDM and Tehsildar it was found that the electricity connection of illegal structure/ Mosque was illegally taken and FIR against the accused Management Committee was lodged under Electricity Act. To claim the title of land, Mosque Committee presented various documents of Waqf registration, which were later found to be forged and thus the demolition of the illegal structure was done as per law after affording reasonable opportunity to the affected parties.

== Health infrastructure ==
Tehsil Ram Sanehi Ghat has:

- community Health centres - 01
- PHCs - 04
- Sub centres - 30

== Notable residents ==
- Baijnath Kureel was Member of Parliament during 1952 to 1977 to the 1st, 2nd, 3rd, 4th and 5th Lok Sabha from Ramsanehighat (Lok Sabha Constituency).
- Ashutosh Anand Awasthi-Two times National awardee teacher(President award, governor Award ) -Residence -Village Raipur, Near Gokula

== See also ==
- Barabanki (Lok Sabha constituency)
