= Jahangirabad Institute of Technology =

Educational institution in Uttar Pradesh

Jahangirabad Institute of Technology, otherwise JIT, is an educational institution located in Barabanki, Uttar Pradesh, India. It was established in 2001 to advance the cause of technical and professional education. This is an institute under Jahangirabad Educational Trust Group of Institutions approved by the All India Council for Technical Education (AICTE) for the establishment of an integrated campus for offering multiple disciplines in Engineering & Management.
