= Bahrelia =

Bahreliya, also called Barholia, Bahrauliya or Bahrela) is a Rajput clan, found in and around the Barabanki district in the Indian state of Uttar Pradesh.

Their lineage is linked with Sisodiya Rajputs. They are the descendant of Suryavanshi Rana Raja Brahm Singh Sisodia (Baram Bali Singh) of Marwar and some descendants of Trilokchandi Raja Bannar Shah Bais of Etawah who came to Taluka Surajpur Bahrela, they are called Bahrelia.

In Hijri 964 AD 1547, Maharaja Brahm Singh Sisodia (Baram Bali Singh) was ordered that Raja Awar Khan Adil Khan Jor Khan of Bahrela had refused to pay the goods, so he should be punished. Maharaja Brahm Singh Sisodia reached village Bahrela of Dariyabad district via Etawah Gohamunj, with him Trilokchand Bais Rajput Raja Bannar Shah from Etawah Gohamunj also came to his aid. and defeated and killed Avar Khan and his army. And Maharaja Brahm Singh Sisodia got 71 villages near Bahrela and Maharaja Brahm Singh Sisodia made his residence in Bahrela and established Surajpur state and made Surajpur his capital. Raja Bannar Shah Bais was also given 8 villages but he did not remain, in the 18th generation of Maharaja Brahm Singh Sisodia became Raja Gurdutt Singh (Raja Singh ji).

Raja Man Singh and the British Governor General's forces took Raja Singh ji hostage. And sent to Lucknow jail and the same Raja Singh was sentenced to death, after which Raja Singh ji's wife Rani Lekhraj Kunwar constructed Ramsnehi Ghat Chamirganj from Surajpur Bahrela and made her residence there. This property included fifty-six villages. Its owner was Udatt Pratap Singh, who had become the head of Bahreliya. But he was mentally and physically unfit to manage his property, but as long as his maternal grandfather, Udat Narayan, lived, there was no fear of betrayal of the family by under-owners, tenants or patwaris. After that Raja Mahipal Singh became the king of Hathonda, after his death his son Raja Prithvipal Singh Bahrelia Surajpur Bahrela became the king of Hathonda.
