= Banki, Uttar Pradesh =

- town
- Location in Uttar Pradesh, India Banki, Uttar Pradesh (India)
- Coordinates: 27.00°N 81.20°E
- Country: India
- State: Uttar Pradesh
- District: Barabanki

Government
  - Type: nagar panchayat
  - Body: irfaana khatoon
- Elevation: 93 m (305 ft)

Population (2001)
  - Total: 16,997

Languages
  - Official: Hindi, Urdu
- Time zone: UTC+5:30 (IST)
- PIN: 225001
- Telephone code: 05248
- Vehicle registration: UP-41
- Website: up.gov.in

Banki is a town, a nagar panchayat and a block panchayat in Barabanki district in the state of Uttar Pradesh, India.

== Demographics ==
As of the 2001 Census of India, Banki had a population of 16,997. Males constitute 57% of the population and females 43%. Banki has an average literacy rate of 58%, lower than the national average of 59.5%; with 64% of the males and 36% of females literate. 15% of the population is under 6 years of age.

== Administration ==
=== Block Panchayat Banki ===
Block panchayat Banki comes under tehsil Nawabganj. It has 75 gram panchayats.
