= Amir Haider =

Indian politician

Amir Haider (born 1936) is a politician from Barabanki, Uttar Pradesh, India.

== Early life ==
Haider was born in Lucknow, Uttar Pradesh in 1936. He received his primary education in the village of Mittai in Barabanki district before going to Lucknow for his higher education, where he joined student politics and became the first president of Shia College's students' union. He also held several posts in Lucknow University's student union.

== In politics ==
Haider joined the Communist Party in the late 1950s as state secretary. He was imprisoned in Tihar Jail along with Dr. Ram Manohar Lohia, Mani Ram Bagri, and other socialist leaders. In 1966 he joined the Indian National Congress. Since then he has held several positions, including chairman of the State Minority Cell, general secretary, member of the All India Congress Committee (three terms), and Uttar Pradesh PCC (seven terms). He is currently a member of the Congress Working Committee and chairman of the Senior Men Cell. Recently came into controversy by writing a book named 'Bitter Truth' after 2014 Lok Sabha Election on why congress lost.

== Social movements ==
Haider is a member of the Red Cross board of governors and runs several educational institutions that aim to give quality education to poor children for free. He has led several movements representing the cause of sugarcane farmers. He also filed a case against Amitabh Bachchan and Jaya Bachchan in a Barabanki land case in 2006. He is currently working on the issue of land acquisition by builders and developers at low rates through putting pressure on farmers in parts of Uttar Pradesh.
