= Dewa, India =

Dewa
- Town
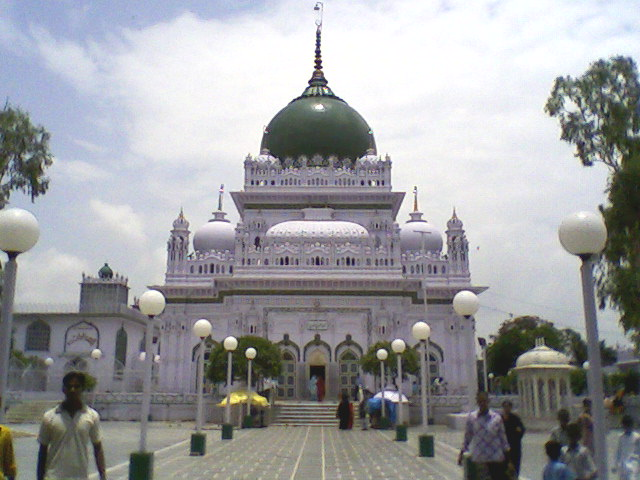

- Location in Uttar Pradesh, India Dewa (India)
- Coordinates: 27.03°N 81.17°E
- Country: India
- State: Uttar Pradesh
- District: Barabanki
- Founder: Waris Ali Shah

Government
  - Type: Nagar Panchayat
- Elevation: 137 m (449 ft)

Population (2011)
  - Total: 15,662

Language
  - Official: Hindi
  - Additional official: Urdu
- Time zone: UTC+5:30 (IST)
- PIN: 225301
- Telephone code: 05248
- Vehicle registration: UP-41
- Website: up.gov.in

Dewa Sharif or Dewa is a town and a nagar panchayat in Barabanki district in the state of Uttar Pradesh, India. It is famous for the shrine of Haji Waris Ali Shah. This town is also known by the name of Dewa Sharif in respect for the shrine. It is about 26 km north-east of the state capital Lucknow.

The state government formally recognises Dewa Sharif as a town with a linguistic minority population, where speakers of Urdu constitute 15 per cent or more of the local population. It was placed as one among the prominent sites in Heritage Arc of U.P.

== Geography ==
Dewa is located at 27.03°N 81.17°E. It has an average elevation of 137 metres (449 feet).

== Demographics ==
As of 2011 Indian Census, Dewa had a total population of 15,662, of which 8,231 were males and 7,431 were females. Population within the age group of 0 to 6 years was 2,347. The total number of literates in Dewa was 7,967, which constituted 50.9% of the population with male literacy of 54.4% and female literacy of 47.0%. The effective literacy rate of 7+ population of Dewa was 59.8%, of which male literacy rate was 63.9% and female literacy rate was 55.4%. The Scheduled Castes and Scheduled Tribes population was 746 and 18 respectively. Dewa had 2485 households in 2011.

As of the 2001 Census of India, Dewa had a population of 12,819. Males constitute 53% of the population and females 47%. Dewa had an average literacy rate of 45%, lower than the national average of 59.5%: male literacy was 51% and female literacy 38%. In Dewa, 17% of the population was under 6 years of age.

== Administration ==
=== Block Panchayat Dewa ===
Block Panchayat Dewa Sharif has 88 Village Panchayats.

== Road connectivity ==
Dewa Sharif is well connected to Lucknow, Fatehpur, Barabanki, Suratganj, Kursi, Masauli and Cinhat via road.

== Attractions ==
Dewa Sharif is notable for the shrine of Haji Waris Ali, a Sufi saint.
