= Dariyabad, Barabanki =

Dariyabad
- Town
- Location in Uttar Pradesh, India
- Coordinates: 26°53′32″N 81°33′20″E
- Country: India
- State: Uttar Pradesh
- District: Barabanki
- Elevation: 116 m (381 ft)

Population (2011)
  - Total: 18,338

Languages
  - Official: Hindi, Urdu
- Time zone: UTC+5:30 (IST)
- <!225403-- PIN -->: 225403
- Vehicle registration: UP-41
- Website: http://dariyabad.org

Dariyabad is a town and nagar panchayat in the Barabanki district in the state of Uttar Pradesh, India.

== History ==
Dariyabad was founded in 1436 AD and established in 1444 AD. Dariya Khan was posted as viceroy after Sultan Mirza Badshah, and came to Awadh Lucknow and stayed in Imperial castle in Mahmudabad. Since this place was famous due to violence by bhad tribe, later viceroy Dariya Khan freed this place by Bhad tribe and named this place as Dariyabad on his own name. Dariya Khan was an officer of the Delhi sultanate.

== Demographics ==
As of 2001 India census, Dariyabad had a population of 15,661. Males constitute 52% of the population and females 48%. Dariyabad has an average literacy rate of 67%, lower than the national average of 79.9%; male literacy is 74% and, female literacy is 61%. In Dariyabad, 17% of the population is under 6 years of age.

== Politics ==
The Dariyabad Assembly constituency represents the area.

== Notable residents ==
- Abdul Majid Daryabadi – Indian Muslim writer and exegete of the Qur'an
- Major General Afsir Karim – Indian author and Retd. Major General Indian Army
- Shafey Kidwai – Indian academic, communication scientist, translator, columnist and author.
