= Dariyabad, Prayagraj =

Dariyabad
- town
- Country: India
- State: Uttar Pradesh
- Established: 26 January 1951
- Demonym: Languages
- Time zone: UTC+5:30 (IST)
- Vehicle registration: UP 70
- Website: up.gov.in

Dariyabad (Hindi: दरियाबाद) is a locality in of Prayagraj, Uttar Pradesh, India. Dariyabad is a neighbour of Meerapur. Dariyabad is surrounded by the Yamuna River from one side. The Takshakeswar temple, dedicated to Shiva, is in Dariyabad.
