= Rajeev Kumar Singh (Dariyabad politician) =

Indian politician from Uttar Pradesh

Member of the Uttar Pradesh Legislative Assembly
- Incumbent
- Assumed office 11 March 2017
- Preceded by: Sinod Kumar Shakya
- Constituency: Dataganj

Chairman, Delegated Legislation Committee, Uttar Pradesh Legislative Assembly
- Incumbent
- Assumed office October 2025

Personal details
- Born: 18 September 1961 (age 65) Dataganj, Budaun, Uttar Pradesh, India
- Party: Bharatiya Janata Party
- Parent: Rampal Singh (father)
- Profession: Politician, Agriculturist, Businessperson

Rajeev Kumar Singh (also known as Babbu Bhaiya; born 18 September 1961) is an Indian politician and a member of the 18th Uttar Pradesh Assembly, representing the Dataganj Assembly constituency in Budaun district, Uttar Pradesh. He is a member of the Bharatiya Janata Party (BJP) and serves as the Chairman of the Delegated Legislation Committee of the Uttar Pradesh Legislative Assembly.

== Early life ==
Rajeev Kumar Singh was born on 18 September 1961 in Dataganj, Budaun district, Uttar Pradesh, to Rampal Singh. He holds a post-graduate degree.

== Political career ==
Singh contested the 2017 Uttar Pradesh Legislative Assembly election as a Bharatiya Janata Party candidate from the Dataganj Assembly constituency and defeated his nearest rival, Sinod Kumar Shakya of the Bahujan Samaj Party, by a margin of 25,759 votes to become a member of the 17th Uttar Pradesh Assembly.

In the 2022 Uttar Pradesh Legislative Assembly election, he was re-elected from Dataganj, defeating Samajwadi Party candidate Arjun Singh by a margin of 9,476 votes.

In October 2025, Speaker Satish Mahana appointed him Chairman of the Delegated Legislation Committee (Pratinihit Vidhayan Samiti) of the Uttar Pradesh Legislative Assembly.

== Electoral performance ==
=== 2022 ===
2022 Uttar Pradesh Legislative Assembly election: Dataganj
Party	Candidate	Votes	%	±%
BJP	Rajeev Kumar Singh (Babbu Bhaiya)	107,591	45.34	+10.15
SP	Arjun Singh	98115	41.35	
BSP	Rachit Gupta	20581	8.67	−15.06
INC	Atif Khan	2376	1.00	−13.34
None of the Above	NOTA	1463	0.62	
Majority		9476	3.99	−7.47
Turnout		237304	58.30	+0.60
		Swing		

== Positions held ==
Term	Position	Legislature
2017–2022	Member, Uttar Pradesh Legislative Assembly	17th Uttar Pradesh Assembly
2022–present	Member, Uttar Pradesh Legislative Assembly	18th Uttar Pradesh Assembly
October 2025–present	Chairman, Delegated Legislation Committee	18th Uttar Pradesh Assembly

== See also ==
- 17th Uttar Pradesh Assembly
- 18th Uttar Pradesh Assembly
- Dataganj Assembly constituency
