= Jahangirabad Raj =

City in Uttar Pradesh, India

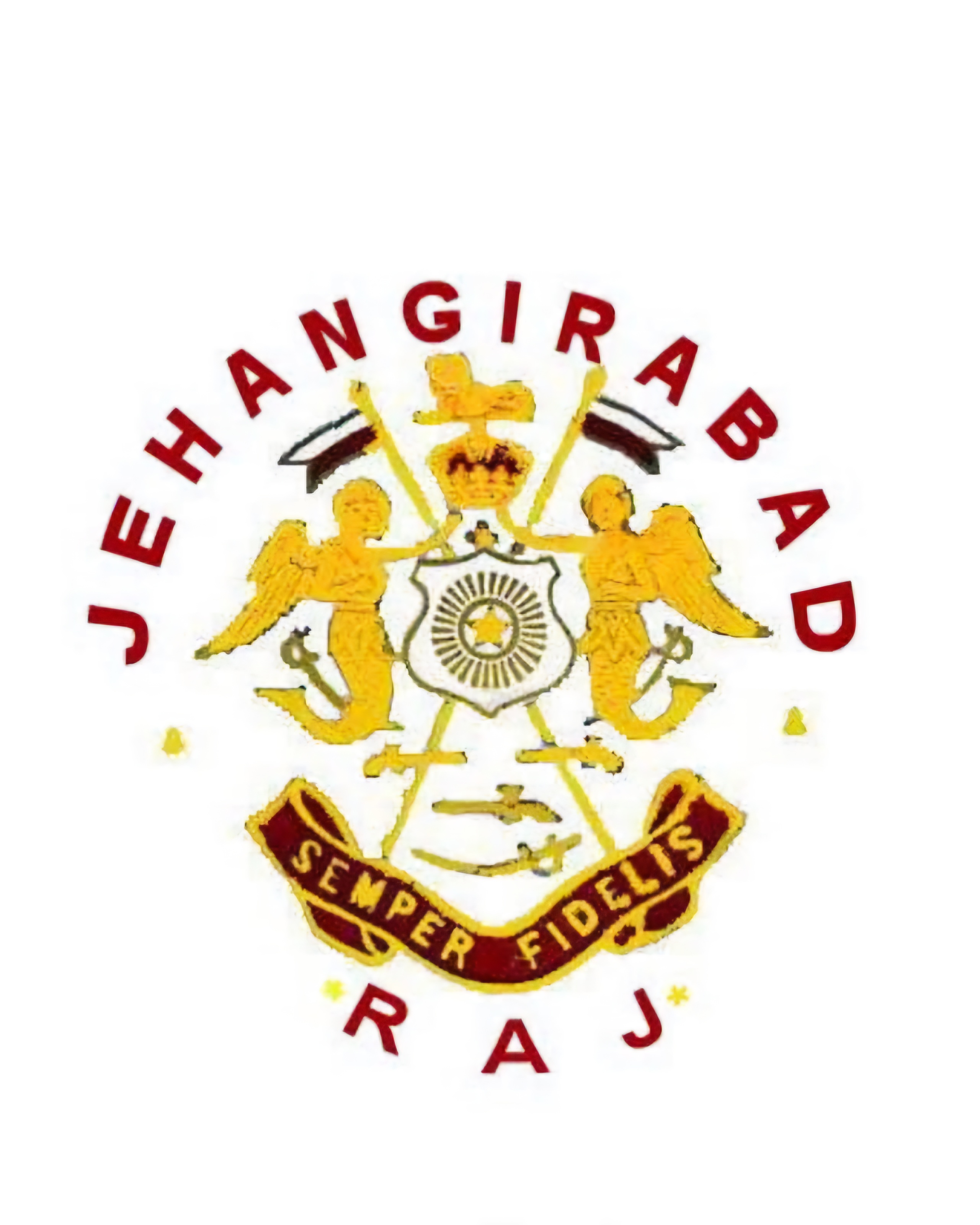
- COAT OF ARMS (COA)

- Location in Uttar Pradesh, India
- Coordinates: 26.58°N 81.14°E
- Country: India
- State: Uttar Pradesh
- District: Barabanki
- Jagir, Estate, Riyasat: AD 1360
- Founder: Raja Hussain Khan

Languages
  - Official: Hindi, Urdu, Awadhi
- Time zone: UTC+5:30 (IST)
- PIN: 225203
- Vehicle registration: UP-41

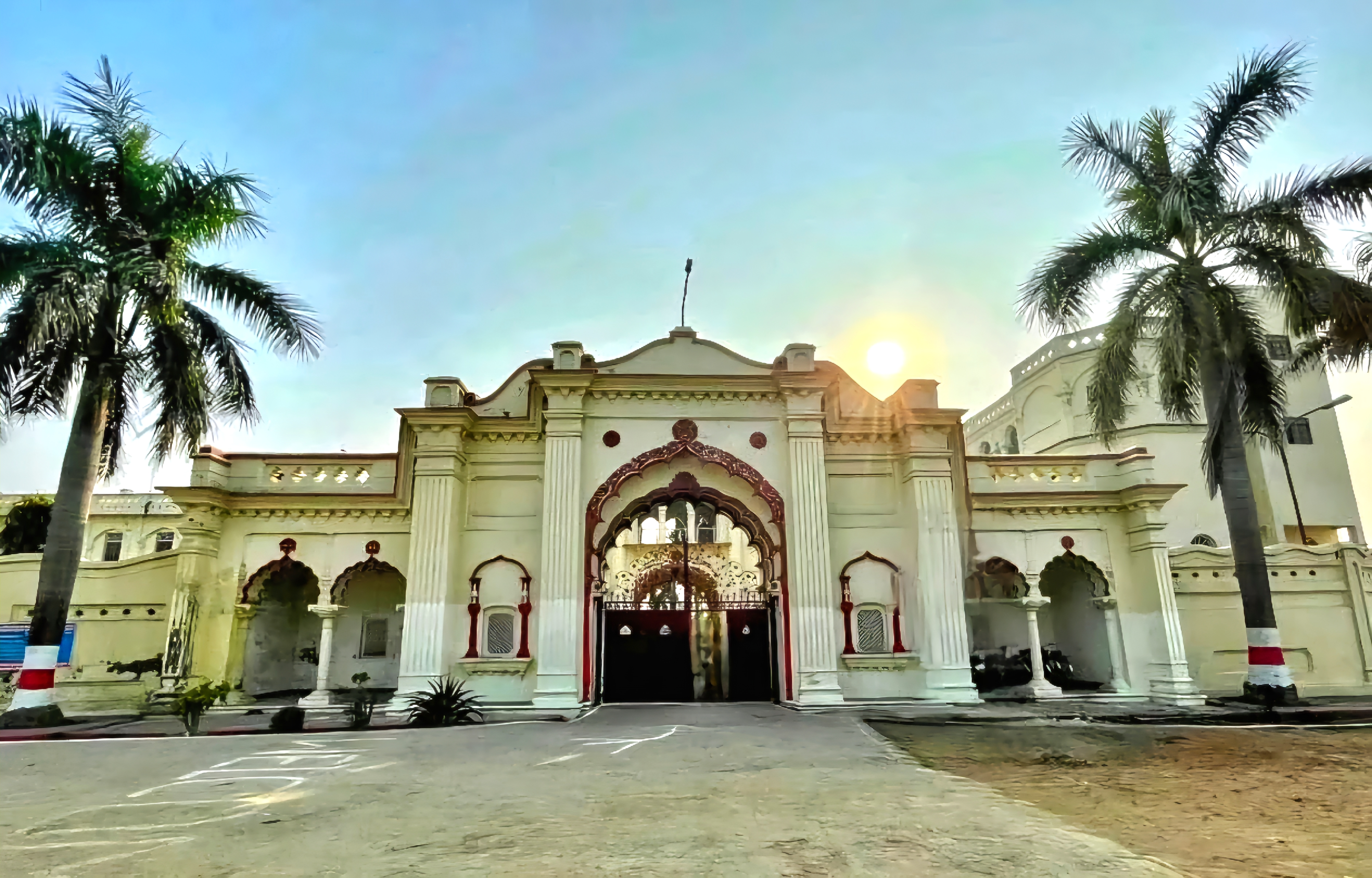
Jahangirabad Fort

Jahangirabad Raj, also known as Jehangirabad, governed from Jahangirabad Estate, India, and was one of the largest feudal estates in the erstwhile Kingdom of Awadh in Oudh State. The rulers are generally referred to as Raja Saheb or Nawab Saheb of Jahangirabad or Raja Jahangirabad.
