= Barabanki district =

- District
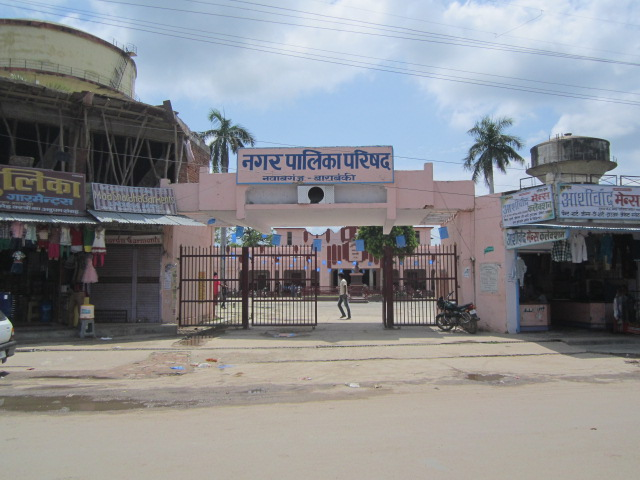
- Nagar palika building in Barabanki

- Location of Barabanki district in Uttar Pradesh
- Coordinates (Barabanki, Uttar Pradesh): 26.92°N 81.20°E
- Country: India
- State: Uttar Pradesh
- Division: Ayodhya
- Headquarters: Barabanki
- Tehsils: 1. Nawabganj; 2. Fatehpur; 3. Ram Sanehi Ghat; 4. Haidergarh; 5. Ram Nagar; 6. Sirauli Ghauspur

Government
  - District collector: Shashank Tripathi, IAS
  - Lok Sabha constituencies: Barabanki (Lok Sabha constituency)
  - Vidhan Sabha constituencies: 1. Barabanki; 2. Kursi; 3. Ram Nagar; 4. Zaidpur; 5. Dariyabad; 6. Haidergarh

Area
  - Total: 3,891.5 km^{2} (1,502.5 sq mi)

Population (2011)
  - Total: 3,260,699
  - Density: 837.90/km^{2} (2,170.2/sq mi)
  - Urban: 330,803

Demographics
  - Literacy: 61.75%
  - Sex ratio: 910
- Time zone: UTC+05:30 (IST)
- Vehicle registration: UP-41
- Major highways: NH 27, NH 727H, NH927, NH28
- Average annual precipitation: 1050 mm
- Website: barabanki.nic.in

Barabanki district is one of the five districts of Ayodhya division in the central Awadh region of Uttar Pradesh, India. Barabanki city is the administrative headquarters of Barabanki district. Total area of Barabanki district is 3891.5 Sq. km. It borders seven other districts of Uttar Pradesh. With its most northern point it shares borders with the Sitapur district, while its north-eastern boundary is defined by the Ghagra, beyond which lie the districts of Bahraich district and Gonda district. Its eastern border is shared with Ayodhya district, and the Gomti forms a natural boundary to the south, dividing it from the Amethi district. On the west, it adjoins the Lucknow district.

It has a population of 2,673,581, with a population density of 686.50 per square kilometre (1,778.0/sq mi).

Barabanki district is situated between 27°19′ and 26°30′ north latitude, and 80°05′ and 81°51′ east longitude; it runs in a south-easterly direction, confined by the nearly parallel streams of the Ghaghara and Gomti. The extreme length of the district from east to west may be taken at 92 km (57 mi), and the extreme breadth at 93 km (58 mi); the total area is about 3,900 km^{2} (1,504 sq mi).

In 1856, the district came, with the rest of Oudh State, under British rule. During the Indian Rebellion of 1857, the whole of the Barabanki talukdars joined the mutineers, but offered no serious resistance following the capture of Lucknow.

Barabanki district stretches out in a level plain interspersed with numerous lakes and marshes. In the upper part of the district the soil is sandy, while in the lower part it is clay and produces finer crops. The district is fed by the rivers Ghaghra (forming the northern boundary), Gomti (flowing through the middle of the district), Kalyani and Rait and their tributaries, for the major part of the year. Some rivers dry out in the summer, and become flooded during the rainy season. The changing course of the river Ghagra alters the land area of the district.

The principal crops are rice, wheat, potato, pulse and other food grains and sugarcane. Both of the bordering rivers of Barabanki are navigable. The district is traversed by two lines of the Northern Railway and North-Eastern Railway, with branches having total length of 131 km (81 mi). The district roadways include connections to National Highway 28, state highways and various link roads.

== Etymology ==
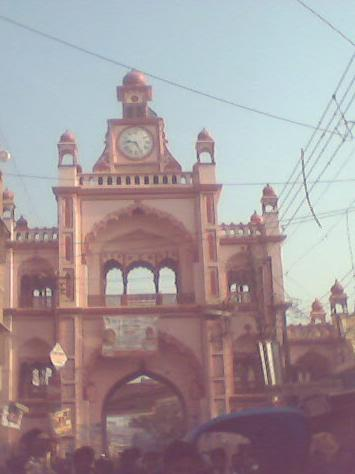
Barabanki Clock Arch, built by H.H. Raja Sir Tassaduq Rasul Khan Taluqdar of Jahangirabad Raj

The area was once known as Jasnaul, from Jas, a Raja of the Bhar tribe, who is said to have founded it before 1000 AD. Following the Muslim conquest, the lands were divided into twelve, with the new owners quarrelling so incessantly that they were called the Barah Banke, or twelve quarrelsome men. Banka, in Awadhi, means a bully or brave. Others derive the name from ban, meaning wood or jungle, and interpret Barabanki as the twelve shares of jungle.

== History ==
The current Barabanki district was first established by the British upon their annexation of Oudh State in 1856. Originally, the district was known as Daryabad district because its headquarters were at Daryabad, but in 1859 they were relocated to Barabanki. The name "Barabanki" was chosen for the district's official name over "Nawabganj", then the more common name of the town, for two reasons: first, to avoid any possible confusion with other places called Nawabganj, and second, because the civil station was technically located outside of Nawabganj in the small revenue village of Barabanki. Previously, under the Nawabs of Awadh, the area that would become Barabanki district was divided between five chaklas: Daryabad-Rudauli, Ramnagar, Dewa-Jahangirabad Raj, Jagdispur, and Haidargarh.

=== Early history and legends ===
Barabanki district is mostly within what was the Pachhimrath division of the kingdom of Rama.

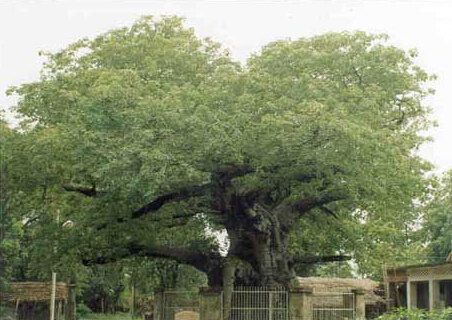
Parijat tree at Kintoor, Barabanki

Parijaat tree is a protected baobab tree in the village of Kintoor, and is considered sacred to Hindus. Located near the Kunteshwar Mahadeva temple (established by Kunti), the tree is said to grow from Kunti's ashes. The tree is very old, though its age has not been scientifically determined.

Before 1000 AD, Jas, a raja of the Bhar tribe, is said to have founded the locality of Jasnaul which later became Barabanki.

=== Medieval India ===
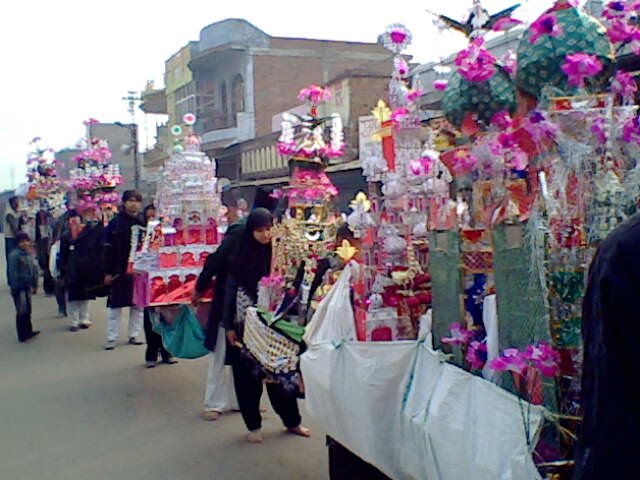
Indian Shia Muslims take out a tazia procession on day of Ashura in Barabanki, India, Jan 2009.

Muslim Infiltration was first tried in what is now the district at Satrikh, in 1030 AD (421 AH). The Muslim conquest saw Sihali attacked and its Hindu sovereign killed. Bhar chief Raja Sohil Deo (or Sohel Dal) of Sahet-Mahet and Rathor monarch Sri Chandradeo of Kannauj fought a battle in Satrikh village of the district and drove out the Foreign Muslim Army in the Battle of Bahraich.

In 1049 AD (441 AH), the kings of Kanauj and Manikpur were again attacked but the foreigners were defeated and driven away from Oudh. The Muslim invasion was not successful in Bara Banki as elsewhere. After, Tarain 1192, Moslems again attacked this region and Ayodhya but were not very successful till the reign of Khiljis and Firoz Tuglaq.The foreigners followed a policy of religious persecution and conversions. They also settled many foreigners and gave them fertile tracts in Ramnagar, Daryabad, Zaidpur, Rudauli areas.

From 1350 to about 1750 AD, Muslim immigrants settled in great number in the district. The Muslims first permanently settled in Oudh.

Rudauli was occupied c. 700 AH, in the reign of Alla-ud-din Khilji, whose forces had destroyed nearly every remaining seat of Chhattri power. Rasulpur was conquered about 1350 AD. Daryabad was founded about 1444 AD by Dariab Khan Subahdar and his brother Fateh Khan colonised. Fatehpur. The villages of Barauli and Barai, near Rudauli, were occupied and became large estates until about the middle of the fifteenth century.

Simultaneously, however, with this latter immigration of the Muslims, there was one of Chhattris. The mysterious tribe of Kalhans, which numbers some twenty thousand persons, are said to be descended from Achal Singh, who came in as a soldier of fortune with Dariab Khan about 1450 AD. Singh had large properties, with a possible capital at Bado Sarai on the old bank of the Ghagra.

The wars had by then shifted to fighting between Muslim princes, with Hindu soldiers employed. The battleground was the Oudh borderland between Sharqis of Jaunpur (where Ibrahim Shah Shargi reigned) and the Lodis of Delhi. Dariab Khan settled Hindu soldiers as garrisons. Oudh clans, said to have emigrated from Gujarat, included the Kalhans, the Ahban, the Pan war, the Gahlot, the Gaur, and the Bais.

The isolated Suryavanshi estate of Haraha and the Sombanshi Bahrelia estate of Surajpur were established by small colonies of Kshatriya foot-steps soldiers.

=== Mughal era (1526–1732) ===
During Akbar's reign, the district was divided under the sirkars of Oudh, Lucknow and Manikpur. Ain-i-Akbari mentions the following parganas (administrative units) during the reign of the Akbar:

Number	Muhals of Ain-i-Akbari	Parganas as of 1878	Sarkars of Ain-i-Akbari
1	Ibrahimabad	Ibrahimabad	Oudh
2	Basorhi	Basorhi	Oudh
3	Bakteha	Baksaha	Oudh
4	Daryabad	Daryabad	Oudh
5	Rudauli	Rudauli	Oudh
6	Sailuk	Sailuk	Oudh
7	Subeha	Subeha	Oudh
8	Satrikh	Satrikh	Oudh
9	Bhitauli	Bhitauli	Lucknow
10	Dewa	Dewa	Lucknow
11	Kumbhi	Dewa	Lucknow
12	Kursi	Kursi	Lucknow
13	Kahanjra	Kursi	Lucknow
14	Siddhaur	Siddhaur	Lucknow
15	Sidhipur	Siddhaur	Lucknow
16	Sihali	Khiron	Lucknow
17	Bhilwal	Haidergarh	Manikpur

=== Nawabs of Awadh (1732–1856) ===
Newal Rae, the naib of wazir Safdar Jang, was defeated and killed at the Kali river by the Bangash Afghans of Farukhabad, who then overran the province except a few of the fortified towns. In 1749 AD, Jang with an army of 60,000 men was defeated. The Mughal authority might have been overthrown had the Oudh Chhattris revolted at this time, but they waited until Jang had bribed or beaten the Rohillas out of the country in 1750 AD (1164 AH).

The tribes gathered themselves together under the leadership of Raja Anup Singh of Ramnagar Dhameri, the Janwar of Balrampur, the Bisens of Gonda, and numerous other lords. The forces assembled for an attack on Lucknow, whose troops had gone into Rohilkhand. The Shekhzadas of Lucknow came out to meet the enemy, joined by the Khanziidas of Mahmudabad and Bilahra, who were connected with them by marriage.

The Musalmans, headed by Nawab Muizz-ud-din Khan of Mahmudabad, were victorious in battle at Chheola Ghat on the Kalyani, on the road to Lucknow. The Balrampur raja was killed and some 15,000 were killed or wounded on both sides. The Khanzadas then rose to power. The Raikwars were proportionately depressed; the estates of both Baundi and Ramnagar were divided, and but a few villages left with the raja. The process of agglomeration commenced again c. 1816, on the death of Saadat Ali Khan II. In 1856, the Ramnagar raja had recovered the family estate and added to it, while his brother of Baundi had similarly added 172 villages to his domain.

There were a total forty-three taluqa. The principal chiefs of Bara Banki during the last years of Nawabi were:

- Taluqa of Jahangirabad Raj – The taluqdar was a Qidwai, Raja Farzand Ali Khan. He inherited the property through marriage to the daughter of Raja Razzak Baksh Khan. Farzand Ali Khan was the inspector in charge of the Sikandarbagh at Lucknow. On one occasion of the last king of Awadh visiting the garden, he was struck with the appearance of this young man, and presenting him with a khilat, directed him to attend at the palace., With such a signal mark of the royal favour, Farzand Ali Khan's advancement was rapid, and, under the interest of the influential eunuch, Bashir-ud-daula, he obtained a farman designating him the Raja of Jahangirabad. This taluqdar followed the deposed king to Calcutta and was there during the mutinies. Raja Farzand Ali Khan was very intelligent and well able to manage his estate with prudence and circumspection., he was the son of Raja Lutf Ali Khan of Maila Raiganj, Nawabganj, Barabanki.
- Taluqa of Ramnagar – The large property of 253 villages belonged to Raja Sarabjit Singh. The raja was the head of the Raikwar clan, which immigrated to Oudh from the hill country of Kashmir c. 1400.
- Taluqa of Haraha – Owned by Raja Narindr Bahadur, the head of the Surajbans Thakurs. He was the son of Raja Chbatarpat Singh, and both were afflicted with mental incapacity. The estate consisted of sixty-six villages and paid a revenue of ₹55,000. Certain members of the Raja's family held the estates of Ranimau Qiampur in a separate qubuliat in the Nawabi, and thus escaped being placed under the taluqdar's sanad.
- Taluqa of Surajpur – This estate comprised fifty-six villages. The proprietor was Udatt Partab Singh, the head of Bahrelia. He was mentally and physically unfit to manage his estate, but so long as his maternal grandfather, Udatt Narain, lived there was no fear of under-proprietors, tenants or patwaris defrauding the family.
- The late Raja Singji was a formidable and violent landholder until he was attacked by Maharaja Man Singh with Captain Orr of the British company's frontier police. They killed almost 70 of his inmate robbers. He was captured and taken prisoner to Lucknow, where he died in jail. Many of his inmate robbers escaped and migrated to neighbouring districts. It was mainly owing to the bad example set by Singji that the Daryabad district was so turbulent under the native government, that amils and chaklas were to use a native expression unable to breathe in it (Nak Mein Dam Karta Tha).
- Taluqa of Barai – Chaudhri Ghulam Farid, a Siddiqi Shekh, was the largest landholder of the Rudauli tahsil. He owned thirty-nine villages. In the settlement at annexation, he gave half of the estate to the children of his cousin, Mumtaz Ahmad.
- Taluqas of Rudauli and parganas of Bhitauli, Daryabad and Surajpur were other important settlements.

Few other later important taluqas were:

- Taluqa of Usmanpur – Founded by Raja Kaunsal Singh, who obtained the estate for military service under the Mughal Emperor Humayun. His son Lakhan Singh converted to Islam, and took the name Lakhu Khan.
- Taluqas of Satrikh – This estate comprised 85 villages. It had been ruled by the Chaudharys, descendants of the original Usmanis who immigrated to Oudh in the early part of the millennium. They were dispossessed for resistance to the British during the 1857 rebellion, and Satrikh estate was ruled by Taluqdar Qazi a.k.a. Kazi Ikram Ahmad.

=== Rebellion of 1857 ===
Unlike what occurred in the districts of Hardoi, Gonda, and Lucknow, the whole body of the taluqdars in this district joined the cause of the deposed king and the mutineers. They offered no resistance, however, of any moment to the advance of the British troops after the capture of Lucknow in the battle of Nawabganj.

=== British Raj (1858–1947) ===
The Sadr station (district headquarters) was placed at annexation and also after the mutinies at Daryabad. However, due to the stagnation of water in the immediate vicinity of the town, and to the prevalence of fever, the headquarters was moved in 1859 to Nawabganj, Bara Banki.

During 1869 census of Oudh, thirteen large towns or kasbahs were identified in the district: Nawabgunj, Musauli, Rasauli, Satrikh, Zaidpur, Sidhaur, Dariabad, Ichaulia, Rudauli, Ram Nagar, Bado Sarai, Kintoor and Fatehpur. The census also noted the following were tahsils and parganas:

Tahsil	Pargana
Nawaba Ganj	Nawabganj
Nawaba Ganj	Patabganj
Nawaba Ganj	Satrikh
Nawaba Ganj	Sidhaur
Ram Nagar	Ramnagar
Ram Nagar	Bhitouli
Ram Nagar	Bado Sarai
Ram Nagar	Fatehpur
Ram Nagar	Mohammedpur
Sani Ghat	Dariabad
Sani Ghat	Surajpur
Sani Ghat	Mawai Mahulara
Sani Ghat	Barsorhi

In 1870, before the addition of two parganas from Lucknow (i.e. Kursi & Dewa) and one pargana each from Rae Bareli and Sultanpur (i.e. Haidergarh and Subeha, respectively), Bara Banki district had area of 3,330 km^{2} (1,285 sq mi) and had following subdivisions:

Tahsil (subdistrict)	Pargana	No. of Villages	Area			Major Talukas & Talukdars
Tahsil (subdistrict)	Pargana	No. of Villages	sq miles	km^{2}	acres	Major Talukas & Talukdars
Nawabaganj	Nawabganj	77	78.9	204.3	50,484	I.— Jehangirabad, Raja Farzand Ali Khan; II.— Sohailpur Bhanmau, Mir Buniad Husen and Amjad Husen. III.— Satrikh, Kazi Sarfraz Ali. IV.— Simrawan, Bissein Thakur Sheo Sahai. V.— Shahpur, Ghulam Abbas and Mahomed Amir. VI.— Gaddia, Shekh Zainulabdin. VII.— Usmanpur, Thakurain Zahur-un-nissa.
Nawabaganj	Partabganj	54	56.0	145.0	35,834	I.— Jehangirabad, Raja Farzand Ali Khan; II.— Sohailpur Bhanmau, Mir Buniad Husen and Amjad Husen. III.— Satrikh, Kazi Sarfraz Ali. IV.— Simrawan, Bissein Thakur Sheo Sahai. V.— Shahpur, Ghulam Abbas and Mahomed Amir. VI.— Gaddia, Shekh Zainulabdin. VII.— Usmanpur, Thakurain Zahur-un-nissa.
Nawabaganj	Satrikh	43	45.9	118.8	29,358	I.— Jehangirabad, Raja Farzand Ali Khan; II.— Sohailpur Bhanmau, Mir Buniad Husen and Amjad Husen. III.— Satrikh, Kazi Sarfraz Ali. IV.— Simrawan, Bissein Thakur Sheo Sahai. V.— Shahpur, Ghulam Abbas and Mahomed Amir. VI.— Gaddia, Shekh Zainulabdin. VII.— Usmanpur, Thakurain Zahur-un-nissa.
Nawabaganj	Siddhaur	224	141.2	365.7	90,377	I.— Jehangirabad, Raja Farzand Ali Khan; II.— Sohailpur Bhanmau, Mir Buniad Husen and Amjad Husen. III.— Satrikh, Kazi Sarfraz Ali. IV.— Simrawan, Bissein Thakur Sheo Sahai. V.— Shahpur, Ghulam Abbas and Mahomed Amir. VI.— Gaddia, Shekh Zainulabdin. VII.— Usmanpur, Thakurain Zahur-un-nissa.
Daryabad-Rudauli (later named to Ram Sanehi Ghat)	Daryabad	241	214.0	554.1	136,931	I.— Surajpur Raja Udatpertab Singh, Burhelia Thakur. II.— Haraha, Raja Narindur Bahadur, Surajbans Thakur. III.— Kamiar, Shere Bahadur, Kalhans Thakur. IV.— Rampur, Rai Ibram Bali, Kaisth. V.— Saidanpur, Latafat-ullah and Inayat-ullah. VI.— Nirauli, Chaudhri Husen Baksh. VII.— Amirpur, Inayat Rassul. VIII.— Purai, Mahomed Abid. IX.- Daryabad, Rai Rajeshwar Bali.
Daryabad-Rudauli (later named to Ram Sanehi Ghat)	Surajpur	107	96.3	249.5	61,645	I.— Surajpur Raja Udatpertab Singh, Burhelia Thakur. II.— Haraha, Raja Narindur Bahadur, Surajbans Thakur. III.— Kamiar, Shere Bahadur, Kalhans Thakur. IV.— Rampur, Rai Ibram Bali, Kaisth. V.— Saidanpur, Latafat-ullah and Inayat-ullah. VI.— Nirauli, Chaudhri Husen Baksh. VII.— Amirpur, Inayat Rassul. VIII.— Purai, Mahomed Abid. IX.- Daryabad, Rai Rajeshwar Bali.
Daryabad-Rudauli (later named to Ram Sanehi Ghat)	Rudauli	196	172.7	447.4	110,553	I.— Surajpur Raja Udatpertab Singh, Burhelia Thakur. II.— Haraha, Raja Narindur Bahadur, Surajbans Thakur. III.— Kamiar, Shere Bahadur, Kalhans Thakur. IV.— Rampur, Rai Ibram Bali, Kaisth. V.— Saidanpur, Latafat-ullah and Inayat-ullah. VI.— Nirauli, Chaudhri Husen Baksh. VII.— Amirpur, Inayat Rassul. VIII.— Purai, Mahomed Abid. IX.- Daryabad, Rai Rajeshwar Bali.
Daryabad-Rudauli (later named to Ram Sanehi Ghat)	Mawai	51	71.0	184.0	45,469	I.— Surajpur Raja Udatpertab Singh, Burhelia Thakur. II.— Haraha, Raja Narindur Bahadur, Surajbans Thakur. III.— Kamiar, Shere Bahadur, Kalhans Thakur. IV.— Rampur, Rai Ibram Bali, Kaisth. V.— Saidanpur, Latafat-ullah and Inayat-ullah. VI.— Nirauli, Chaudhri Husen Baksh. VII.— Amirpur, Inayat Rassul. VIII.— Purai, Mahomed Abid. IX.- Daryabad, Rai Rajeshwar Bali.
Daryabad-Rudauli (later named to Ram Sanehi Ghat)	Barsorhi	44	34.3	88.9	21,958	I.— Surajpur Raja Udatpertab Singh, Burhelia Thakur. II.— Haraha, Raja Narindur Bahadur, Surajbans Thakur. III.— Kamiar, Shere Bahadur, Kalhans Thakur. IV.— Rampur, Rai Ibram Bali, Kaisth. V.— Saidanpur, Latafat-ullah and Inayat-ullah. VI.— Nirauli, Chaudhri Husen Baksh. VII.— Amirpur, Inayat Rassul. VIII.— Purai, Mahomed Abid. IX.- Daryabad, Rai Rajeshwar Bali.
Ramnagar	Ramnagar	168	112.1	290.4	71,756	I.— Ramnagar, Raja Sarabjit Singh, Raikwar Thakur. II.— Bilheri, Raja Ibad Ali. III.— Mahmudabad, Raja Amir Hussan Khan. IV.— Bhatwamau, Badshah Husen Khanzada. V.— Muhammadpur, Ganga Singh, Raikwar.
Ramnagar	Fatehpur	251	154.0	398.7	98,532	I.— Ramnagar, Raja Sarabjit Singh, Raikwar Thakur. II.— Bilheri, Raja Ibad Ali. III.— Mahmudabad, Raja Amir Hussan Khan. IV.— Bhatwamau, Badshah Husen Khanzada. V.— Muhammadpur, Ganga Singh, Raikwar.
Ramnagar	Muhammadpur	83	61.8	160.1	39,568	I.— Ramnagar, Raja Sarabjit Singh, Raikwar Thakur. II.— Bilheri, Raja Ibad Ali. III.— Mahmudabad, Raja Amir Hussan Khan. IV.— Bhatwamau, Badshah Husen Khanzada. V.— Muhammadpur, Ganga Singh, Raikwar.
Ramnagar	Bado Sarai	56	47.7	123.6	30,541	I.— Ramnagar, Raja Sarabjit Singh, Raikwar Thakur. II.— Bilheri, Raja Ibad Ali. III.— Mahmudabad, Raja Amir Hussan Khan. IV.— Bhatwamau, Badshah Husen Khanzada. V.— Muhammadpur, Ganga Singh, Raikwar.
Total		1,595	504.7	1,307.2	323,011	

In 1871 about half the district was held by 43 talukdars; there were also 5,397 village zemindars (landowners), and 1,354 under-proprietors. The talukas were as follows:

Name of Taluka	Name of Talukdar	No. of Villages	Area		
Name of Taluka	Name of Talukdar	No. of Villages	sq miles	km^{2}	acres
Ramnagar	Raja Sarabjit Singh	358	169.2	438.2	108,286
Huraha	Raja Nurindur Bahadur Singh	66	46.8	121.2	29,960
Bhanmau	Mir Umjad Hosein	10	8.2	21.2	5,233
Jehagerabad	Raja Farzand Ali Khan	72	35.5	92.1	22,751
Surajpur	Raja Talaywand Koer	64	56.9	147.3	36,388
Mahmudabad	Raja Amir Hassan Khan	89	44.8	116.1	28,680
Man Singh	Maharaja Man Singh	16	20.3	52.6	13,009
Malaraiganj	Nawab Ali Khan	11	5.1	13.1	3,235
Shahabpur	Mahomed Amir and Gholam Abbas	8	5.6	14.5	3,578
Simrawan	Thakur Sheosahai	8	6.5	16.9	4,188
Sohailpur	Mir Umjad Hosein	8	3.8	9.9	2,458
Ushdamow	Panday Bahadur Singh	16	5.8	14.9	3,684
Usmanpur	Thakur Roushan Zama Khan	25	11.4	29.6	7,325
Kharkha	Mahomed Hosein	10	7.2	18.6	4,593
Guddia	Shaikh Zainulabdin	12	3.0	7.8	1,933
Satrikh	Kazi Ikram Ahmed	85	14.7	38.1	9,420
Gootiah	Hakim Kurrum Ali	13	8.7	22.5	5,549
Subeha	Surfaraz Ahmed	1	0.9	2.3	564
Sulaunpur	Nawab Ali Khan	6	6.1	15.8	3,892
Kotwa	Abid Ali	1	0.5	1.3	331
Motree	Bhugwant singh	1	1.6	4.2	1,040
Tribadiganj	Raja Thakurpershad Tribadi	2	1.3	3.3	813
Lillowly	Buxshee Harpershad	11	3.9	10.2	2,510
Nurhowl	Shaik Boo Ali	3	2.3	5.9	1,465
Mirpur	Nusserudeen	4	3.8	9.8	2,416
Baytowly	Maharaja Runbir Singh	5	5.5	14.3	3,535
Rampur	Thakur Gooman Singh	1	0.6	1.4	357
Jubrahpur	Thakur Ruder Pratab Singh	2	1.1	2.8	700
Bilharrah	Raja Ibad Ali Khan	41	24.7	64.1	15,838
Muhammadpur	Thakur Ganga Singh	26	7.8	20.2	4,981
Bhatwamau	Badsha Hasan Khan	23	13.2	34.2	8,459
Rampur	Rai Ibram Balli	35	21.2	54.9	13,571
Kumyar	Shere Bahadur	10	21.0	54.3	13,430
Sydanpur	Latafat-ul-lah and Mayet-ul-lah	13	8.5	22.0	5,428
Pushka	Naipal Singh	4	3.3	8.6	2,129
Raneemau	Outar Singh	14	8.9	23.0	5,687
Nurrowly	Chaudhri Razah Husain	45	36.2	93.7	23,157
Barrai	Chaudhri Gholam Farid and Mahboob-ul-Rahamn	46	25.1	64.9	16,039
Purai	Meer mahomaed Abid	14	10.5	27.2	6,722
Amirpur	Chaudhri Ishan Russul	13	7.1	18.4	4,557
Burrowly	Chaudhri Wazeer Ali	25	6.0	15.7	3,871
Nearah	Shere Khan	13	4.7	12.1	2,993
Retch	Raghunath Singh	1	3.4	8.8	2,183
Total		1,158	682.1	1,766.8	436,574

In 1877, Barabanki was one of the three districts of the then Lucknow division. Its area was 4,580 km^{2} (1,768 sq mi) and population was 1,113,430.

As per 1877 Gazetteer of the province of Oudh there were:

- Four tehsils:
  - Nawabganj
  - Ram Sanehi Ghat
  - Fatehpur
  - Haidergarh
- Nine thanas:
  - Nawabganj
  - Zaidpur
  - Tikaitnagar
  - Sanehi Ghat
  - Bhilsar
  - Fatehpur
  - Kursi
  - Ramnagar
  - Haidergarh
- Courts, following were officers with civil, criminal and revenue powers:
  - a deputy commissioner
  - two assistant commissioner
  - three extra assistant commissioner
  - four tehsildars
  - four honorary magistrates

=== Independence movement ===
In the struggle for independence from 1922 to 1934 during the Khilafat movement, the district participated in the growing movement against foreign fabrics, etc. On 26 October 1942, Brij Bahadur and Hans Raj (a.k.a. Sardar) planted a bomb in a police outpost at Barabanki, known as Barabanki Outpost Bomb Case.

== Geography ==
Barabanki district is for the most part flat agricultural lands studded with groves. The most elevated point is about 130 metres (430 ft) above sea level, and there are few points of view from which any expanse of the countryside can be surveyed. In the north, the topography is broken by a 6.1-metre (20 ft) ridge running parallel to the Ghaghra at a distance of 1.6 to 4.8 km (1 to 3 mi), which is said to indicate the former right bank of this river. These lands are undulating and richly wooded, while to the south there is a gentle slope down to the Gomti. The district is intersected at various parts by rugged ravines.

=== Rivers and waters ===
==== Ghaghra ====
The principal river in the district is the Ghaghra at a short distance from Bahramghat; it is formed by the Himalaya-fed rivers Chauka and Sarda, which meet in the Fatehpur tehsil. It is 2.4 to 3.2 km (1.5 to 2 mi) wide in the rainy season and about 0.80 km (0.5 mi) wide during the dry season, when the discharge is about 19,000 cubic feet per second (540 m^{3}/s). For 77 km (48 mi), the river divides the Barabanki district from the districts of Bahraich and Gonda. It flows in a south-easterly direction past Ayodhya, and empties into the Ganges at Arrah. This river is navigable for flat-bottomed steamers as far as Bahramghat, and is used by country boats in considerable numbers between Bahramghat and Sarun district. The principal ferries are at Kaithi, Kamiar, and Paska Ghat; a floating bridge operates at Bahramghat during the cold season. The river's flood plains generally have fine crops of rice, but the water sometimes lies too long after the rains and rots them, and the spring crops cannot be sown. The river is not utilised for irrigation.

==== Gomti ====
Next in importance is the Gomti, which runs through the tahsil of Haidargarh and some portion of the tehsil Ram Sanehi Ghat, and separates the Bara Banki district from the districts of Lucknow, Sultanpur and Faizabad. Like the Ghagra, it runs in a south-easterly direction, has a well-defined bank and a stream which is fordable in the dry weather, when it is about 37 m (120 ft) wide. The circuitous course of the Gomti covers 169 km (105 mi) though the direct distance is half that distance. It is therefore not very efficient for transportation, though there is considerable traffic by country boats. Its dry weather discharge is 14 cubic metres per second (500 cu ft/s). Its water is at a lower level than the Ghagra, and it is not used for irrigation. At the junction of the Kalyani, the Ghagra is only 92 metres (301 ft) above sea level.

==== Kalyani ====
The Kalyani River rises in the Fatehpur tahsil, and empties into the Gomti near the village of Anarpatti. In the rains of 1872, the Kalyani presented a vast volume of water – 82 metres (269 ft) broad and 103 metres (337 ft) deep – rushing at 9.24 km/h (5.74 mph) with a discharge of 1,459 cubic metres per second (51,540 cu ft/s). In typical monsoons, the maximum discharge is about three-quarters of this. The river is crossed by a railway bridge with six spans of 18 metres (60 ft).

==== Jamuriha and Reth ====
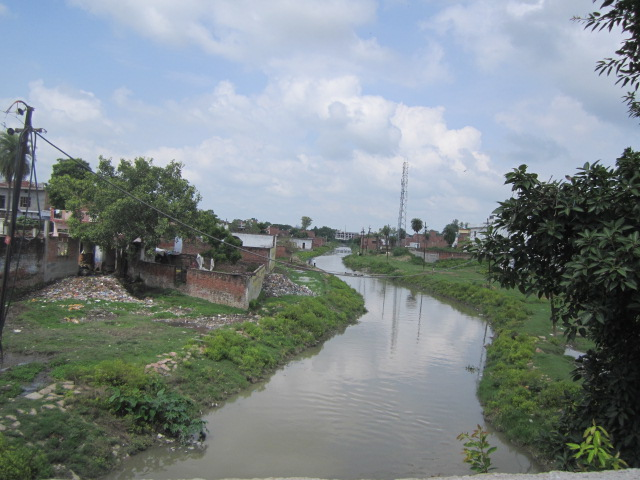
View of Jamuriya Nala (a brook) from Railway Station Road Bridge, Barabanki. This brook flows through Barabanki city, dividing it in half.

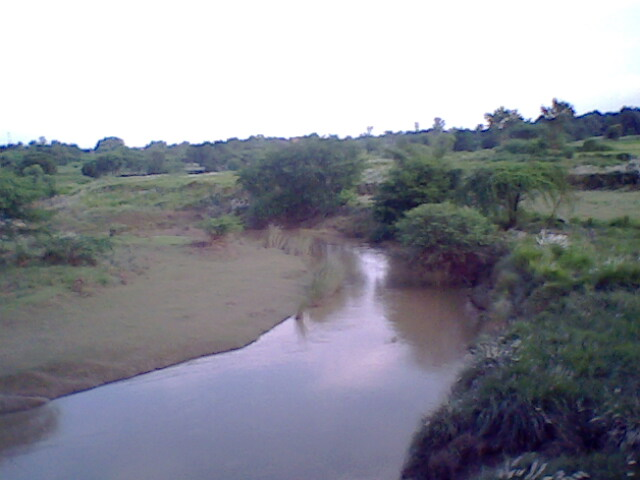
View of Reth river in Barabanki city as seen from railway bridge crossing over it.

The Jamuriha and Reth, both in the Nawabganj tehsil, are the only other notable streams in this district. Their general characteristics are the same: they have significant flows during rains which have carved steep and rugged banks broken by innumerable ravines. They flow into the Gomti. Haidergarh, Deviganj, Choury and Alapur are settlements on the Reth, while Jamuriha passes through Barabanki city (Barabanki revenue village on one side and Nawabganj Tehsil hq on other).

==== Tanks, jheels and wetlands ====
There are numerous tanks and jheels, especially in the tehsils of Daryabad, Ram Sanehi Ghat, and Nawabganj. Seven per cent of the area is covered with water; many of the tanks are in course of being deepened, earth is removed to replenishing cultivated land, though such efforts are complicated by conflicting rights to the tanks. Some of the jheels are navigable by small boats for sport or pleasure. The finest jheel in this district, that named Bhagghar, is situated in the Suratganj; it covers less than 5.2 km^{2} (2 sq mi). There is another in Dewa, covering about 13 km^{2} (5 sq mi) with water and marsh. Parva, Nardahi, and Ganhari Jheel are the major wetlands.

==== The Gomti-Kalyani doab ====
This doab is a fertile area of about 146,526 ha (362,070 acres). It is bounded by the Kalyani river to the north, the Gomti river and its tributary to the south, the Sarda Sahayak feeder channel to the west, and the confluence of the Gomti and Kalyani rivers to the east.

== Demographics ==
Historical population
Year	Pop.	±% p.a.
1901	1,025,624	—
1911	942,608	−0.84%
1921	895,722	−0.51%
1931	925,401	+0.33%
1941	1,011,287	+0.89%
1951	1,099,754	+0.84%
1961	1,234,931	+1.17%
1971	1,424,536	+1.44%
1981	1,740,799	+2.03%
1991	2,112,782	+1.96%
2001	2,673,581	+2.38%
2011	3,260,699	+2.01%

According to the 2011 census, Barabanki district had a population of 3,260,699. It then ranked 107th out of India's 640 districts). The district had a population density of 740 inhabitants per square kilometre (1,900/sq mi). Its population growth rate over the decade 2001–2011 was 26.40%. Barabanki had a sex ratio of 887 females for every 1,000 males, and a literacy rate of 61.75%. Only 10.15% of the population lives in urban areas. Scheduled Castes made up 26.51% of the population.

=== Religion ===
Religions in Barabanki district (2011)
Religion	Percent
Hinduism	76.84%
Islam	22.61%
Other or not stated	0.55%
Distribution of religions

Hinduism is the largest religion. Islam is a large minority, and is in equal proportions with Hinduism in urban areas.

=== Languages ===
Languages of Barabanki district (2011)
1. Hindi (91.5%)
2. Urdu (6.16%)
3. Awadhi (2.11%)
4. Others (0.19%)

At the time of the 2011 Census of India, 91.54% of the district population spoke Hindi (or a related language), 6.16% Urdu and 2.11% Awadhi as their first language.

One of the many languages spoken in the district is Awadhi, a vernacular in the Hindi continuum spoken by over 38 million people, mainly in the Awadh region of India.

== Government and politics ==
=== Administration and divisions ===
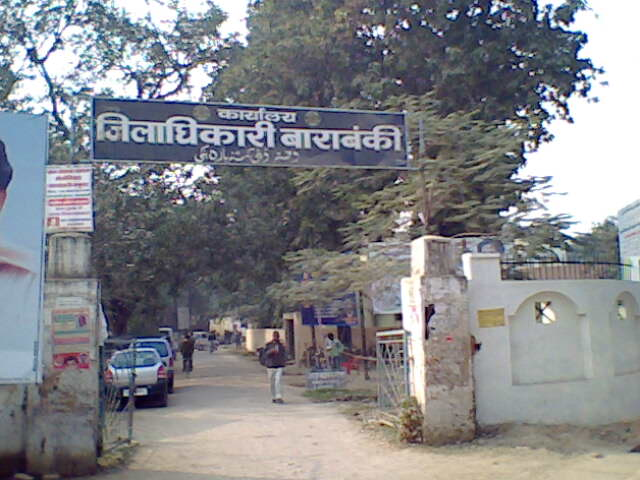
Office of District Magistrate/Collector

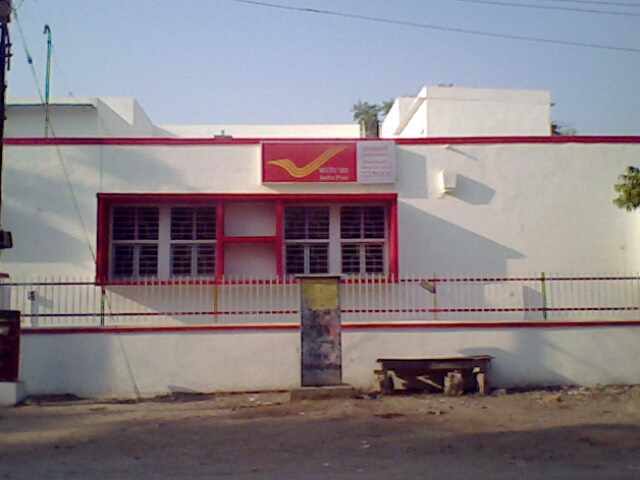
Barabanki Head Post Office

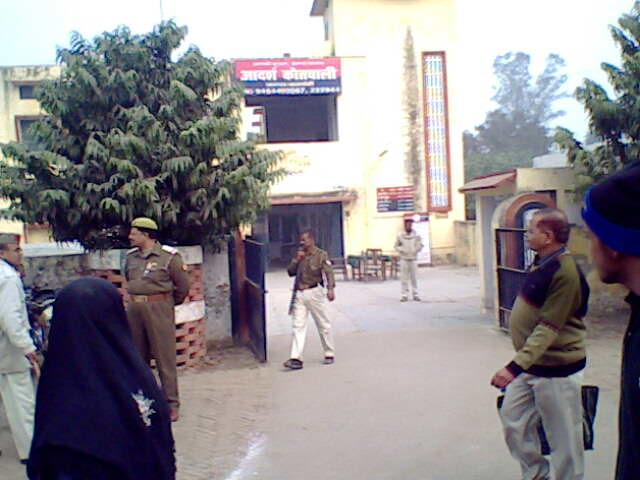
Barabanki Kotwaali built by H.H. Raja Sir Tassaduq Rasul Khan Taluqdar of Jahangirabad Raj

Barabanki is one of the five constituent districts of Faizabad Division. The other districts being Ayodhya, Sultanpur, Amethi and Ambedkar Nagar. The division is headed by the divisional commissioner.

As of 2003–04, the district contained 7 tehsils, 17 blocks, 154 nyaya panchayat and 1,140 gram sabhas.

As per 1991 data, there were 1,812 inhabited villages and 31 inhabited villages. In 2001, there were 14 towns and cities, 2 nagar palika parishads, 1 cantonment area, 10 nagar panchayats and 1 census town.

==== Land administration ====
Barabanki District is divided into six subdivisions, popularly known as tehsils: Nawabganj, Fatehpur, Ramsanehi Ghat, Haidergarh, Ram Nagar and Sirauli Ghauspur. The District Revenue Administration is headed by the District Collector (also known as District Magistrate), with the office at the collectorate, and these tehsils are under the charge of sub-divisional magistrates.

==== Development ====
District-level developmental activities are coordinated by the Chief Development Officer whose office is at the District Rural Development Agency (DRDA) at the collectorate. The district-level offices for monitoring the developmental activities of Blocks at Barabanki are located at Vikas Bhawan. Block development officers, who head each of the 15 development blocks of the district, carry out the development schemes on behalf of the government. The development blocks are: Banki, Masauli, Dewa, Harakh, Fatehpur, Haidergarh, Dariyabad, Suratganj, Siddhaur, Pure Dalai, Nindura, Trivediganj, Ram Nagar, Sirauli Ghauspur and Banikodar.

==== Law and order ====
The law and order administration is jointly coordinated by the District Magistrate and the Superintendent of Police. The district is subdivided into 22 police stations (thanas), each of which is headed by an inspector or sub-inspector of police. 12 police stations are rural and 9 are rural. These police stations are: Haidergarh, Satrikh, Dariyabad, Baddupur, Dewa, Kursi, Zaidpur, Mohammadpur, Ram Nagar, Fatehpur, Safderganj, Kotwali, Ramsanehi Ghat, Asandra, Subeha, Tikait Nagar, Lonikatra, Masauli, Kothi, Ghungter, Badosarai and Jahangirabad Raj.

==== Urban ====
The district has 14 urban administrative bodies for its towns, which are:

- Nawabganj Nagar Parishad for Barabanki Town
- Fatehpur Nagar Panchayat for Fatehpur Town Area
- Zaidpur Nagar Panchayat for Zaidpur Town Area
- Dariyabad Nagar Panchaya for Dariyabad Town Area
- Ramnagar Nagar Panchayat for Ramnagar Town Area
- Satrikh Nagar Panchayat for Satrikh Town Area
- Haidergarh Nagar Panchayat for Haidergarh Town Area
- Dewa Nagar Panchayat for Dewa Town Area
- Siddhaur Nagar Panchayat for Siddhaur Town Area
- Tikaitnagar Nagar Panchayat for Tikaitnagar Town Area
- Rudauli Nagar Parishad for Rudauli Town
- Banki Nagar Panchayat for Banki Town Area
- Cantonment Board for Cantonment Area in Barabanki
- Rampur Bhavanipur Census Town
- Subeha Nagar panchayat for Subeha town (effective 2008)

==== Electoral ====
===== Parliament and state assembly =====
Barabanki district has seven state-assembly constituencies which fall under two parliamentary constituencies. They are:

No.	No of Assembly Constituency	Name of Assembly Constituency	Assembly Constituency Reservation Status	Total Booths in Assembly Constituency	Net Voters in Assembly Constituency	No of Parliamentary Constituency	Name of Parliamentary Constituency	Parliamentary Constituency Reservation Status	Net Voters in Parliamentary Constituency	Ref
1	266	Kursi	General	343	295030	53	Barabanki	Scheduled castes (SC)	1,435,692	
2	267	Ram Nagar	General	323	260,400	53	Barabanki	Scheduled castes (SC)	1,435,692	
3	268	Barabanki	General	322	289,765	53	Barabanki	Scheduled castes (SC)	1,435,692	
4	269	Zaidpur	SC	359	302,189	53	Barabanki	Scheduled castes (SC)	1,435,692	
5	272	Haidergarh	SC	327	288308	53	Barabanki	Scheduled castes (SC)	1,435,692	
6	270	Dariyabad	General	337	304,073	54	Faizabad (partial)	General	150,6120	
7	271	Rudauli (partial)	General	304	282,890	54	Faizabad (partial)	General	150,6120	

====== State assembly ======
Sitting MLAs (As of 2026):

- Sakendra Pratap Verma, 266-Kursi, BJP
- Fareed Mehfooz Kidwai, 267-Ramnagar, SP
- Dharamraj Singh Yadav, 268-Barabanki, SP
- Gaurav Kumar Rawat, 269-Zaidpur, SP
- Dinesh Rawat, 272-Haidergarh, BJP
- Satish Chandra Sharma, 270-Dariyabad, BJP

====== State council ======
Barabanki district sends two members to state-council. Sitting members are:

1. Rajesh Yadav "Raju"
2. Ram Naresh Rawat

=== Basic amenities ===
Following is the list of public amenities (1999–2002 data):

==== Communication services ====
- Urban Post Office 26
- Rural Post Office 339
- Telegraph Office 19
- Telephone Connections 25691

==== Public distribution system ====
- Rural fair-price shops 1094
- Urban fair-price shops 118
- Bio-gas plants 4645
- Cold storage 16

==== Electricity ====
- Total electrified villages 1103
- Total electrified towns/cities 13
- Electrified Schedule Caste localities 1149

==== Water supply ====
Area covered under water supply using taps/ handpumps of India Mark-2:

- Village 1812
- Towns/city 14

== Economy ==
The district's economy is primarily based on agriculture. Agriculture, bio-gas plants, animal husbandry, and small-scale industries provide direct and indirect employment.

=== Agriculture ===
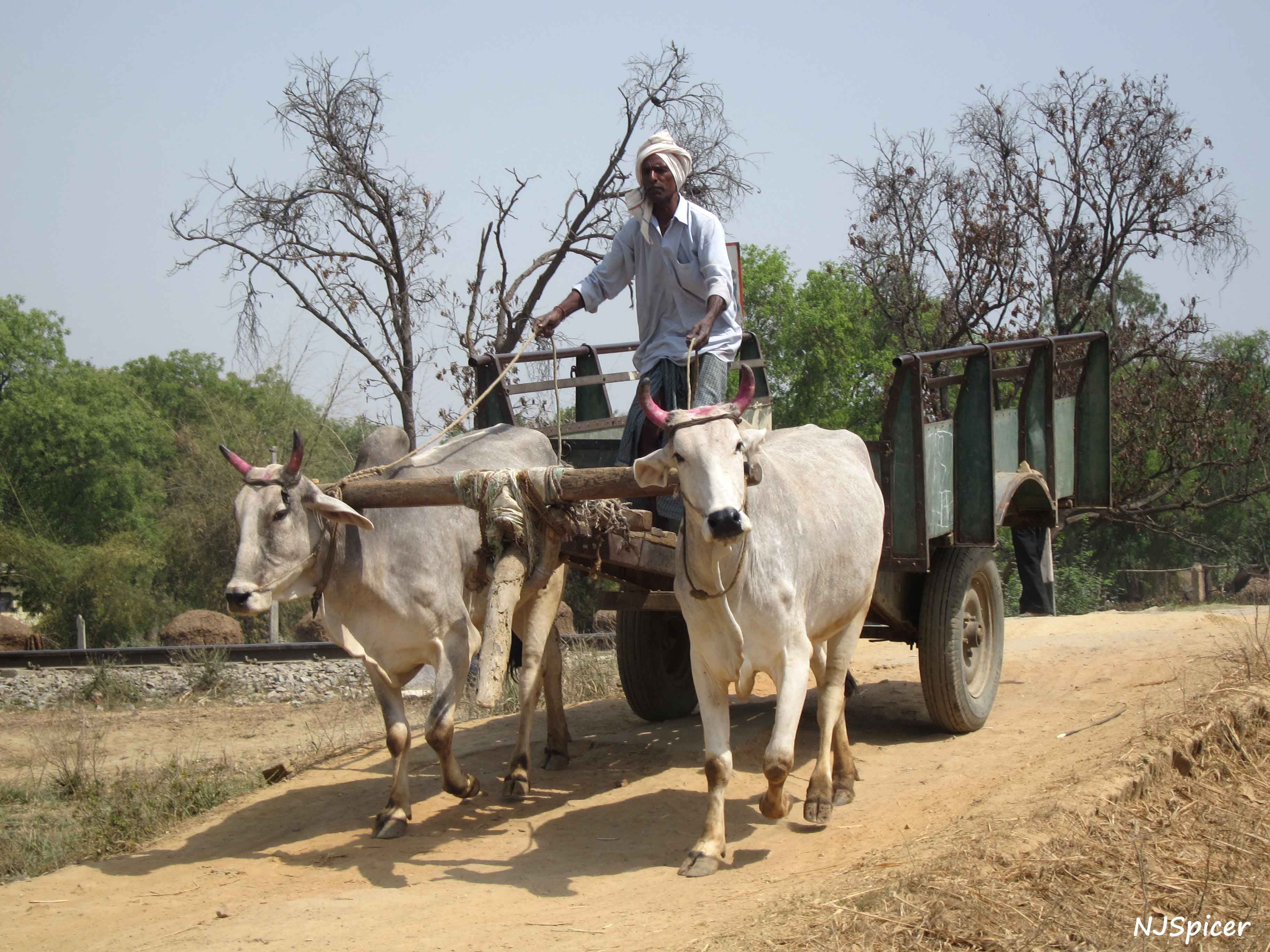
Farmer with bullock cart

In Barabanki the net irrigated area is 84.2% (compared to the Uttar Pradesh average of 79%). The intensity of irrigation in Barabanki is 176.9% (compared to the state average of 140%). Most of irrigation in Barabanki is done through private tube wells (69%) and canals (30%).

Subsistence agriculture is practised in Barabanki, with up to five crops rotated per year. The dominant crops are cereals (occupying 68.4 per cent of cropped areas), mainly paddy (rice) (34.4%) and wheat (31.3%). Other crops include pulses (10.1%) and sugarcane 3.6%), and potatoes (2.8%). Wheat, rice and maize are chief food crops of the district. Opium, menthol oil, sugarcane, fruits (mango, banana, etc.), vegetables (potato, tomato, mushroom, etc.), flowers (gladiolus, etc.), spices, etc. are the chief cash crops for export. Barabanki has been major hub of opium production since British rule; the district opium officer, based at Afeem Kothi, is the only one in the state.

Barabanki leads the country in menthol farming, with 81 km^{2} (20,000 acres) under cultivation.

Apart from crop farming, livestock-based farming, broiler farming, and fish cultivation is also prevalent in the district. Bee keeping is practised in the Dewa block of the district.

The district is home to a Regional Agriculture Seed Testing & Demonstration Station of the federal Department of Agriculture. In 2004, a Krishi Vigyan Kendra (KVK, agricultural science centre) was established in the district under Narendra Dev University of Agriculture and Technology. The Institute for Integrated Society Development established a Rural Technology Development and Dissemination Centre in 2002 at Nindura Block of Barabanki District. National Fertilizers Limited has established a Soil Testing Lab in the district. Information and Communication Technologies has a centre in the district.

=== Cottage industry ===
- Handicrafts industry
- Handloom industry

Weaving products including scarfs, shawls and stoles, some of which are exported. These products are broadly categorised as rayon fibre or cotton yarn. Barabanki scarves were displayed at a national handloom expo. Barabanki has also emerged as a handkerchief production hub.

- Embroidery,

Zardozi- In 2013 the Geographical Indication Registry (GIR) accorded the Geographical Indication (GI) registration to the Lucknow Zardozi – the world-renowned textile embroidery from Lucknow. The Zardozi products manufactured in areas in Lucknow and six surrounding districts of Barabanki, Unnao, Sitapur, Rae Bareli, Hardoi and Amethi became a brand and can carry a registered logo to confirm their authenticity.

=== Industry ===
There are six industrial areas in the District Barabanki,

- UPSIDC Agro Park, Kursi Road, Barabanki
- Industrial Area, Dewa Road, Barabanki
- Industrial Area, Rasool Panah, Fatehpur, Barabanki
- Mini Industrial Area, Ismailpur, Dewa, Barabanki
- Mini Industrial Area Amarsanda, Barabanki
- Mini Industrial Area Sohilpur, Harkh, Barabanki

The companies and factories include:

- India PolyFibres Limited

The Company is engaged in manufacturing of polyester staple fibre, polyester, and tow with technology from Du Pont, US.

- U.P. State Spinning Mill, Barabanki
- U.P. State Sugar Corp. Ltd., Barabanki
- DSM Sugar, Rauzagaon, Barabanki, U.P.
- Hally Industries pvt. Ltd., Barabanki – supplies welding electrodes and owns a wire-drawing unit and a rice mill
- J.R. Agro Industries Limited – operates a solvent extraction plant and a vegetable oil refinery.
- J.R. Organics Ltd. (formally Somaiya Organics Ltd.)
- Bharat Rubber Industries – supplies rubber and rubber-related products/
- Shree Shyam Industries, Tehsil Fatehpur

=== Solar power plant ===
The first 2 megawatt-capacity solar power plant project of Uttar Pradesh is situated in Sandauli village of Barabanki district, it was inaugurated on 10 May 2012 and become operational in January 2013. The plant was set up by Technical Associates Ltd.

== Culture ==
=== Cultural heritage ===
In 2011–12 almost 2 million people visited the twin sites of Lodheshwar Mahadev Mandir and Deva Sharif shrine.

=== Notable people ===
- Royalty
  - Rajeshwar Bali (1889–1944), 13th Taluqdar - Rampur Dariyabad, Honorary Magistrate, Barabanki, Minister of Education & Health United Provinces
- Athletes
  - K. D. Singh, (2 February 1922 – 27 March 1978), field hockey player. He was captain of the gold medal-winning Indian Olympic Hockey team at the 1952 Summer Olympics.
  - Beni Prasad Verma,(11 February 1941 – 27 March 2020) was an Indian politician and a member of the Samajwadi Party. Earlier he was with Samajwadi Party of Mulayam Singh Yadav, then he joined Indian National Congress and was elected on its ticket to Lok Sabha in 2009. In 2016 he rejoined Samajwadi Party.
  - Atul Verma, won India its first Olympic archery medal, a bronze in the boys' individual archery competition at the 2014 Youth Summer Olympics.
- Religious figures
  - Jagjivan Das (born 1727, date of death unknown), founder of the Satnaami branch of Hinduism. He wrote Aagam Paddhati, Agh Vinaash, Gyan Prakash, Maha Pralay, Param Granth, Prem-Path, and Shabd-Sagar.
  - Gazi Saiyyed Salar Sahu of Satrikh (died 1200s), who won the recognition of his contemporaries and exerted one of the most powerful influences in Awadh spiritual history.
  - Waris Ali Shah, (1819–1905), a Sufi saint from Dewa, was the founder of Warsi order of Sufism and a poet. He wrote Hans-Jawahir.
  - Syed Mir Muhammad Quli Musavi – wrote Kintoori, principal Sadr Amin at the British court in Meerut.
- Hamid Hussain Musavi (died 1880) author of Abaqat ul Anwar fi Imamat al Ai'imma al-Athar.
  - Abdul Majid Daryabadi
- Military
  - Ibrahim Bek of Dewa.
- Literary
  - Khuda Bakhsh Sheikh of Dariyabad, wrote poetry and a biography of Waris Ali Shah.
  - Khumar Barabankvi (1919–1999), an Urdu poet and lyricist.
  - Abdul Bari Nadvi, was member of first Managing Committee of Darul Mussannefin Shibli Academy
  - Majaz is prominent Urdu poet from Barabanki. He hails from *Rudauli and maternal uncle of famous lyricist Javed Akhtar.
- Politicians
  - Rafi Ahmed Kidwai, Freedom Fighter and Congress leader
  - Shaikh Shahid Husain, Indian barrister who was a Taluqdar. He was also a member of the All-India Muslim League and was the father of Air Commodore FS Hussain and Indian broadcaster-novelist Attia Hosain
  - Mohsina Kidwai, politician
  - Amir Haider, politician
  - Beni Prasad Verma, politician, former MP and Ministry of Steel of India
  - Panna Lal Punia, former Member of Loksabha from Barabanki (Lok Sabha constituency), politician
  - Upendra Singh Rawat, current Member of Loksabha from Barabanki (Lok Sabha constituency), politician
  - Akhlaqur Rahman Kidwai, politician
  - Anantram Jaiswal, politician
- Others
  - Abdul Quddus Gangohi (1456–1537) bin Shaykh Muhammad Ismail bin Shaykh safi al-djn Hanafi Ghaznavi Chishti Gangohi, a Sufi Shaykh.
  - Ahmad Hindi, paternal grandfather of Ayatollah Khomeini, was born in Kintoor.
  - Naseeruddin Shah, an actor was born in 1950 in Barabanki.
  - Shiva Balak Misra, geologist, writer and social worker
  - Mushirul Hasan,:originally belongs to village Muhammadpur, Tehsil Fatehpur, historian, author and ex-Vice-Chancellor of Jamia Millia Islamia University at Delhi.

== Transport ==
=== Road transport ===
National Highway 28 (NH-28) passes through the district. It is well connected to other cities by means of roadways. Passenger road transport services in Uttar Pradesh started in 1947 with the operation of bus service on the Lucknow–Barabanki route by UP Government Roadways.

- Bus Station/Bus Stop 93

=== Railway ===
Both the Northern Railway and the North Eastern Railway pass through Barabanki district, with a total of 131 km (81 mi) of broad-gauge line and 19 stations.

== Education ==
=== Schools and intermediate colleges ===
- Government Inter College, Barabanki city
- Jawahar Navodaya Vidyalaya, Sonikpur, Trivediganj, Barabanki
- Saraswati Shishu Mandir, Barabanki city

=== Engineering colleges ===
- Jahangirabad Institute of Technology, Jahangirabad
- Sagar Institute of Technology & Management, Faizabad Road

=== Polytechnic institute ===
- Government Polytechnic Barabanki, Jahangirabad Road

=== Other professional institutions ===
- Jahangirabad Media Institute, Jahangirabad

=== Research institutions ===
- International Rice Research Institute - branch Tikarhar Road, Kursi, Barabanki
