= Ramnagar, Barabanki =

Ramnagar
- Town
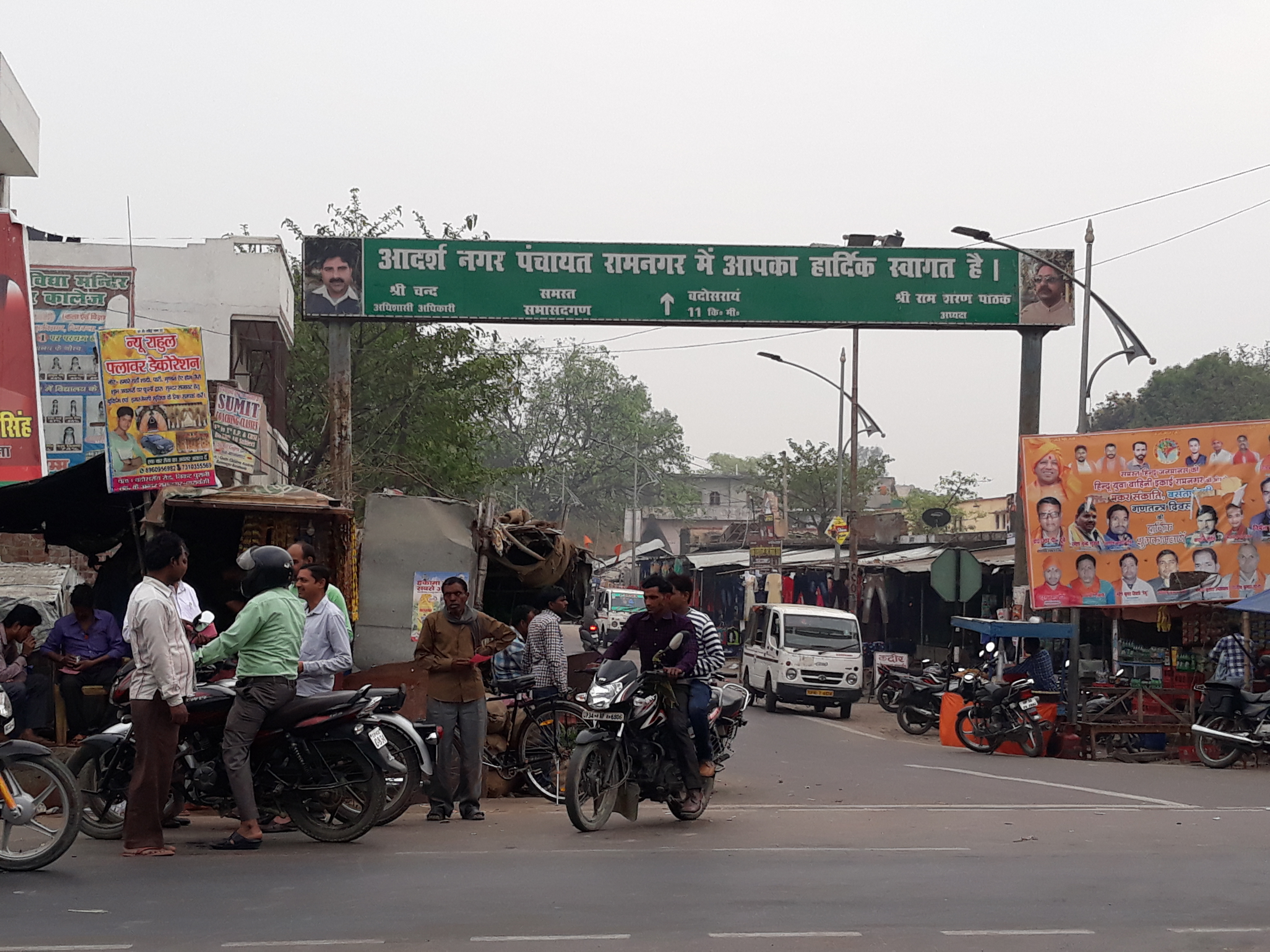

- Location in Uttar Pradesh, India Ramnagar (India)
- Coordinates: 27°05′44″N 81°29′05″E
- Country: India
- State: Uttar Pradesh
- District: Barabanki

Government
  - Type: Nagar panchayat
- Elevation: 64 m (210 ft)

Population (2011)
  - Total: 14,255

Language
  - Official: Hindi
  - Additional official: awadhi
- Time zone: UTC+5:30 (IST)
- Postal code: 225205
- Vehicle registration: UP-41

Ramnagar is a town in Barabanki district in the state of Uttar Pradesh, India. It is a town, tehsil and a nagar panchayat in Barabanki District in the Indian state of Uttar Pradesh.

== Geography ==
Ramnagar is located at 27°05′44″N 81°29′05″E. It has an average elevation of 64 metres (209 feet). It is close to some historic and religious places like Mahadeva Temple, Kunteshwar Temple and Parijaat Tree etc. RamNagar is situated on NH28C. Burhwal Junction is the nearest railway station.

== Demographics ==
As of 2001 India census, Ramnagar had a population of 12,416. Males constitute 53% of the population and females 47%. Ramnagar has an average literacy rate of 52%, lower than the national average of 59.5%: male literacy is 59%, and female literacy is 45%. In Ramnagar, 18% of the population is under 6 years of age.
