= Rawat (surname) =

Family name

- Language: Hindi, Kumaoni, Garhwali

Origin
- Region of origin: Uttarakhand, Rajasthan, Gujarat

Other names
- See also: Parmar (Panwar), Negi, Rautela, Bisht, Bhandari, Rana

The surname Rawat is a prominent family name in South Asia, particularly in India. It is commonly associated with Rajputs of Rajasthan, Uttarakhand (Garhwal and Kumaon), and Himachal Pradesh. The name is also used among various communities in the Himalayan regions and carries connotations of nobility and leadership. In Uttarakhand, Rajasthan and Himachal Pradesh the surname is used among Thakurs.

== Meaning ==
The surname Rawat is derived from the Sanskrit word "Rajvata," meaning "ruler" or "kingdom."

The word 'Rawat' is a compound where 'Ra' stands for Rajput, 'Va' for Veer (brave), and 'Ta' for Talwar (sword). It symbolizes a Rajput warrior who is brave and skilled with the sword — known as a Rawat Rajput.

Historically, it was used as a title for people who performed exceptionally well in wars or possessed exceptional bravery Over time, it became a hereditary surname passed down through generations.

== Notable people ==
=== A–M ===
- Abhishek Rawat (born 1980), Indian television actor
- Amisha Rawat (born 2003), Indian para athlete
- Amrita Rawat (born 1958), Indian politician
- Anuj Rawat (born 1999), Indian cricketer
- Anupama Rawat (born 1983), Indian politician
- Asha Rawat (born 1982), Indian cricketer
- Ashok Kumar Rawat (born 1975), Indian politician
- Bachi Singh Rawat (1949–2021), Indian politician
- Baij Nath Rawat, Indian politician
- Bhagwan Shankar Rawat (born 1940), Indian politician
- Bharat Singh Rawat, Indian politician
- Bipin Rawat (1958–2021), 1st Chief of Defence Staff of India
- Brijesh Kumar Rawat (born 1966), Member of the Uttar Pradesh Legislative Assembly
- Chandan Singh Rawat (1928–2008), Indian footballer
- Chitrashi Rawat (born 1989), Indian actress
- Deepak Rawat (born 1977), Indian Administrative Service officer
- Dhan Singh Rawat (born 1966), Indian politician
- Dhan Singh Rawat (Rajasthan politician) (born 1966), Indian politician
- Dilip Singh Rawat, Indian politician
- Dinesh Rawat (born 1990), Member of the Uttar Pradesh Legislative Assembly
- Diwan Singh Rawat, Indian academic
- Durga Bahadur Rawat, Nepali politician
- Gopal Singh Rawat (1958–2020), Indian civil servant (died 2020)
- Gopal Singh Rawat (politician) (1960–2021), Indian politician
- Gyarsilal Rawat (born 1962), Indian politician
- Harak Singh Rawat (born 1960), Indian politician
- Harish Chandra Singh Rawat (1934–2008), Indian mountaineer
- Harish Rawat (born 1948), 7th Chief Minister of Uttarakhand
- Harisingh Rawat (born 1955), Indian politician
- Jagat Rawat (born 1974), Indian Film and Television Actor
- Jaswant Singh Rawat (1941–1962), Indian army soldier
- Karan B. Rawat, Indian cinematographer
- Kedar Singh Rawat (born 2000), Indian politician
- Kehar Singh Rawat, Indian politician
- Kuldeep Rawat (born 1984), Indian cricketer
- Kushagra Rawat (born 2000), Indian swimmer
- Lakshman Singh Rawat (1930–2015), Indian Army general
- Mahesh Rawat (born 1985), Indian cricketer
- Mani Singh Rawat, Indian explorer
- Manish Rawat (born 1984), Indian politician
- Manish Singh Rawat (born 1991), Indian racewalker
- Manna Lal Rawat, Indian politician, academic, and social activist
- Manoj Rawat, Indian politician
- Meharban Singh Rawat, Indian politician
- Menuka Rawat (born 1972), Nepalese long-distance runner
- Mohan Singh Rawat (died 2023), Indian politician

=== N–Y ===
- Navaraj Rawat (born 1964), Nepali politician
- Navi Rawat (born 1977), American actress
- Nayan Pal Rawat (born 1971), Indian politician
- Nitendra Singh Rawat (born 1986), Indian marathon runner
- Om Prakash Rawat (born 1953), 22nd Chief Election Commissioner of India
- Pradeep Kumar Rawat (born 1950), Indian diplomat
- Pradeep Rawat (actor) (born 1952), Indian actor
- Pradeep Rawat (politician) (born 1956), Indian politician
- Prahlad Rawat (born 1970), Indian cricketer
- Prashant Singh Rawat (born 2000), Indian basketball player
- Prem Rawat (born 1957), Spiritual leader
- Priyanka Singh Rawat (born 1985), Indian politician
- Rahul Rawat (born 1996), Indian cricketer
- Rajinder Singh Rawat (born 1964), Indian field hockey player
- Rajkumar Rawat (born 1967), Indian politician
- Rajni Rawat, Indian politician
- Ram Naresh Rawat (1962–2022), Indian politician
- Ram Sagar Rawat (born 1951), Indian politician
- Ramnarayan Rawat, Indian political scientist and historian
- Ramnivas Rawat (born 1960), Indian politician
- Rasa Singh Rawat (1941–2021), Indian politician
- Sarang Rawat (born 1995), Indian cricketer
- Sarla Vijendra Rawat (born 1983), Indian politician
- Saurabh Rawat (born 1997), Indian cricketer
- Shaila Rani Rawat (1956–2024), Indian politician
- Shailendra Singh Rawat, Indian politician
- Shakuntala Rawat (born 1968), Indian politician
- Shankar Singh Rawat (born 1955), Indian politician
- Shashwat Rawat (born 2001), Indian cricketer
- Shivani Rawat, American film producer
- Shonal Rawat, Model and TV presenter
- Sulochana Rawat, Indian politician
- Suman Rawat (born 1961), Indian distance runner
- Suraj Rawat (born 1999), Indian footballer
- Suresh Singh Rawat, Indian politician
- Tejpal Singh Rawat (born 1925), Indian politician
- Tirath Singh Rawat (born 1964), 9th Chief Minister of Uttarakhand
- Trivendra Singh Rawat (born 1960), 8th Chief Minister of Uttarakhand, India
- Upendra Singh Rawat (born 1969), Indian politician
- Veena Rawat (born 1945), Indian-born Canadian electrical engineer
- Yogesh Rawat (born 1992), Indian cricketer

== See also ==
- Rawat (disambiguation)
