= 2014 Indian general election in Uttar Pradesh =

Indian general election, 2014 (Uttar Pradesh)
- 10 April − 12 May 2014

80 seats
- Turnout: 58.44% (▲10.65%)
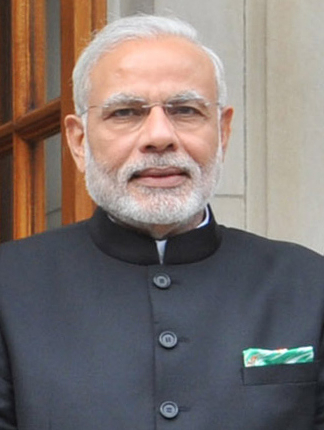

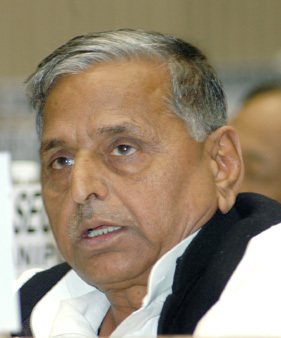

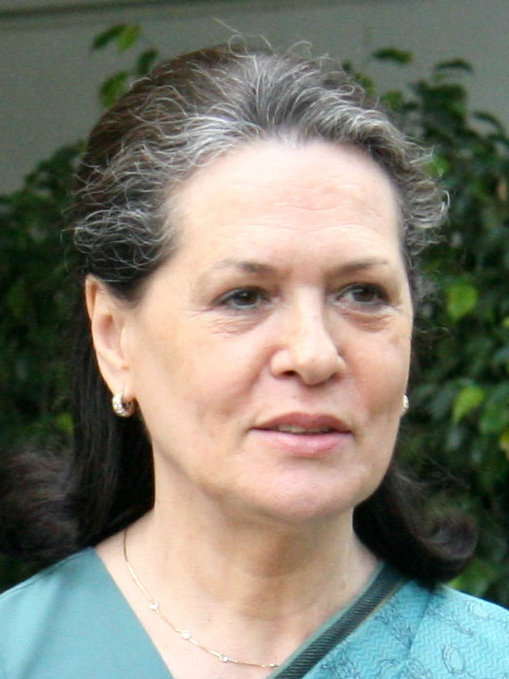

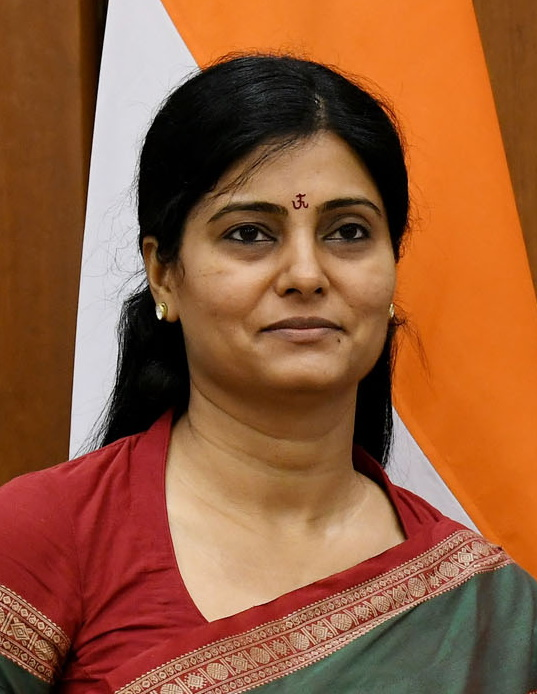

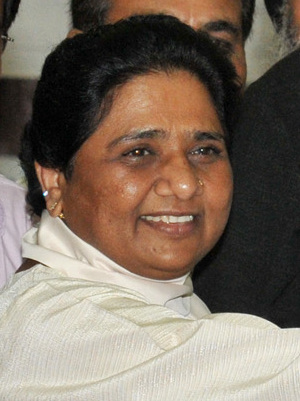

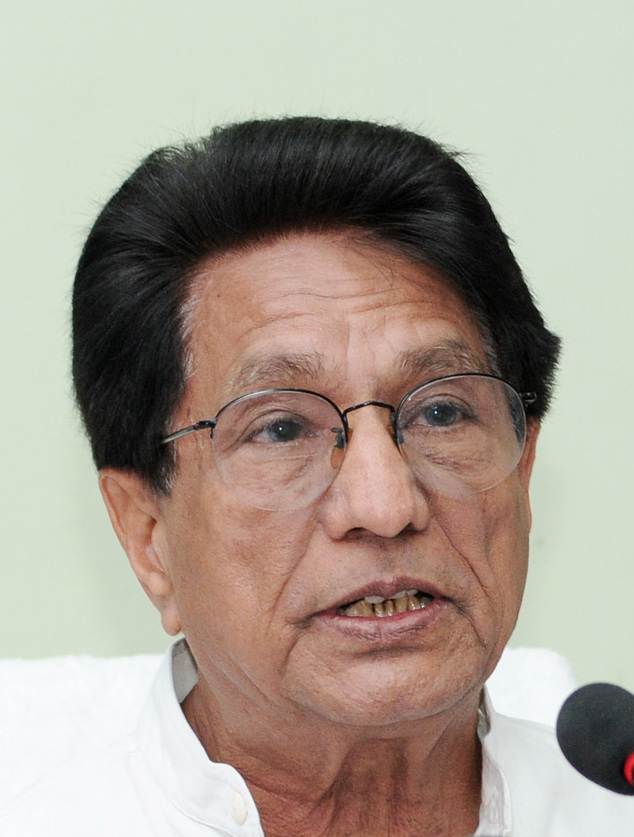
	First party	Second party	Third party
Leader	Narendra Modi	Mulayam Singh Yadav	Sonia Gandhi
Party	BJP	SP	INC
Leader's seat	Varanasi (won, retained) (Note: He had also contested in Vadodara in Gujarat, which he won and vacated, while retaining Varanasi.)	Azamgarh (won, retained); Mainpuri (won, vacated)	Raebareli
Last election	10	23	21
Seats won	71	5	2
Seat change	▲61	▼18	▼19
Popular vote	34,318,854	17,988,967	6,061,267
Percentage	42.63%	22.35%	7.53%
Swing	▲24.80%	▼1.06%	▼10.75%
	Fourth party	Fifth party	Sixth party
Leader	Anupriya Patel	Mayawati	Ajit Singh
Party	AD(K)	BSP	RLD
Leader's seat	Mirzapur	Did not contest (Note: Incumbent member of Andhra Pradesh from Rajya Sabha)	Baghpat (lost)
Last election	0	20	5
Seats won	2	0	0
Seat change	▲2	▼20	▼5
Popular vote	812,325	15,914,194	689,409
Percentage	1.01%	19.77%	0.86%
Swing	new party	▼7.82%	N/A
- Seatwise Result Map of the 2014 general election in Uttar Pradesh
Prime Minister before election
Manmohan Singh
INC
Prime Minister after election
Narendra Modi
BJP

The 2014 Indian general election polls in Uttar Pradesh for 80 Lok Sabha seats was held in six phases on 10, 17, 24, 30 April and 7, 12 May 2014. The total voter strength of Uttar Pradesh was 134,351,297.

The main political parties in Uttar Pradesh are Bahujan Samaj Party (BSP), Bharatiya Janata Party (BJP), Indian National Congress (INC) and Samajwadi party (SP). BJP allied with Apna Dal and INC allied with Rashtriya Lok Dal and Mahan Dal.

== Opinion polling ==
Conducted in Month(s)	Ref	Polling Organisation/Agency	Sample size					
Conducted in Month(s)	Ref	Polling Organisation/Agency	Sample size	UPA	NDA	SP	BSP	Others
Aug–Oct 2013		Times Now-India TV-CVoter	24,284	7	17	25	31	0
Dec 2013 – Jan 2014		India Today-CVoter	21,792	4	30	20	24	2
Dec 2013 – Jan 2014		ABP News-Nielsen	64,006	12	35	14	15	4
Jan–Feb 2014		Times Now-India TV-CVoter	14,000	5	34	20	21	0
Feb 2014		ABP News-Nielsen	29,000	11	40	13	14	2
March 2014		NDTV- Hansa Research	46,571	12	40	13	15	0
March–April 2014		CNN-IBN-Lokniti-CSDS	2633	4 – 8	42 – 50	11–17	10–16	0–2
30 March – 3 April 2014		India Today-Cicero	1498	6 – 10	42 – 50	15–21	9–13	0–2
April 2014		NDTV- Hansa Research	24,000	5	51	14	10	9

== Parties and alliances ==
=== National Democratic Alliance ===
Party	Flag	Symbol	Leader	Seats contested
Bharatiya Janata Party			Narendra Modi	78
Apna Dal			Anupriya Patel	2
Total				80

=== Bahujan Samaj Party ===
Party	Flag	Symbol	Leader	Seats contested
Bahujan Samaj Party			Mayawati	80

=== Samajwadi Party ===
Party	Flag	Symbol	Leader	Seats contested
Samajwadi Party			Akhilesh Yadav	78

=== United Progressive Alliance ===
Party	Flag	Symbol	Leader	Seats contested
Indian National Congress			Sonia Gandhi	67
Rashtriya Lok Dal			Chaudhary Ajit Singh	8
Mahan Dal			Keshav Dev Maurya	3
Total				78

== List of Candidates ==
Constituency		NDA		BSP		SP		UPA	
#	Name	Party	Candidate	Party	Candidate	Party	Candidate	Party	Candidate
1	Saharanpur	BJP	Raghav Lakhanpal	BSP	Jagdish Singh Rana	SP	Shazan Masood	INC	Imran Masood
2	Kairana	BJP	Hukum Singh	BSP	Kanwar Hasan	SP	Nahid Hasan	RLD	Kartar Singh Bhadana
3	Muzaffarnagar	BJP	Sanjeev Balyan	BSP	Kadir Rana	SP	Virender Singh	INC	Pankaj Agarwal
4	Bijnor	BJP	Kunwar Bhartendra	BSP	Malook Nagar	SP	Shahnawaz Rana	RLD	Jaya Prada
5	Nagina	BJP	Yashwant Singh	BSP	Girish Chandra	SP	Yashvir Singh	MD	Bhagwan Dass Rathor
6	Moradabad	BJP	Sarvesh Singh	BSP	Haji Mohd Yaqoob	SP	S. T. Hasan	INC	Noor Bano
7	Rampur	BJP	Dr. Nepal Singh	BSP	Akbar Husain	SP	Naseer Ahmad Khan	INC	Nawab Kazim Ali Khan
8	Sambhal	BJP	Satyapal Singh	BSP	Aqeel-ur-Rehman Khan	SP	Shafiqur Rahman Barq	INC	Acharya Pmd. Krishnam
9	Amroha	BJP	Kanwar Singh Tanwar	BSP	Farhat Hasan	SP	Humera Akhtar	RLD	Rakesh Tikait
10	Meerut	BJP	Rajendra Agrawal	BSP	Md. Shahid Akhlaq	SP	Shahid Manzoor	INC	Nagma
11	Baghpat	BJP	Dr. Satya Pal Singh	BSP	Prashant Chaudhri	SP	Ghulam Mohammed	RLD	Ajit Singh
12	Ghaziabad	BJP	Vijay Kumar Singh	BSP	Mukul Upadhyay	SP	Sudhan Kumar	INC	Raj Babbar
13	G. B. Nagar	BJP	Mahesh Sharma	BSP	Satish Kumar	SP	Narendra Bhati	INC	Ramesh Chand Tomar
14	Bulandshahr	BJP	Bhola Singh	BSP	Pradeep Kumar Jatav	SP	Kamlesh	RLD	Anju urf Muskan
15	Aligarh	BJP	Satish Kumar	BSP	Arvind Kumar Singh	SP	Zafar Alam	INC	Bijendra Singh
16	Hathras	BJP	Rajesh Kumar Diwaker	BSP	Manoj Kumar Soni	SP	Ramji Lal Suman	RLD	Niranjan Singh Dhangar
17	Mathura	BJP	Hema Malini	BSP	Yogesh Kr. Dwivedi	SP	Chandan Singh	RLD	Jayant Chaudhary
18	Agra	BJP	Ram Shankar Katheria	BSP	Narayan Singh Suman	SP	Maharaj Singh Dhangar	INC	Upendra Singh Rawat
19	Fatehpur Sikri	BJP	Babulal	BSP	Seema Upadhyay	SP	Rani Pakshalika Singh	RLD	Amar Singh
20	Firozabad	BJP	S. P. Singh Baghel	BSP	Th. Vishwadeep Singh	SP	Akshay Yadav	INC	Atul Chaturvedi
21	Mainpuri	BJP	Shatrughan Chauhan	BSP	Sanghmitra Maurya	SP	Mulayam Singh Yadav		
22	Etah	BJP	Rajveer Singh	BSP	Noor Mohammad Khan	SP	Devendra Singh Yadav	MD	Jogindra Bhadoriya
23	Badaun	BJP	Vagish Pathak	BSP	Akmal Khan urf Chaman	SP	Dharmendra Yadav	MD	Paglanand
24	Aonla	BJP	Dharmendra Kumar	BSP	Sunita Shakya	SP	Kunwar Sarvraj Singh	INC	Saleem Iqbal Shervani
25	Bareilly	BJP	Santosh Gangwar	BSP	Umesh Gautam	SP	Ayesha Islam	INC	Praveen Singh Aron
26	Pilibhit	BJP	Maneka Sanjay Gandhi	BSP	Anis Ahmad Khan	SP	Budhsen Verma	INC	Sanjay Kapoor
27	Shahjahanpur	BJP	Krishna Raj	BSP	Umed Singh Kashyap	SP	Mithilesh Kumar	INC	Chetram
28	Kheri	BJP	Ajay Kumar	BSP	Arvind Giri	SP	Ravi Prakash Verma	INC	Zafar Ali Naqvi
29	Dhaurahra	BJP	Rekha	BSP	Daud Ahmad	SP	Anand Bhadauriya	INC	Jitin Prasada
30	Sitapur	BJP	Rajesh Verma	BSP	Kaisar Jahan	SP	Bharat Tripathi	INC	Vaishali Ali
31	Hardoi	BJP	Anshul Verma	BSP	Shive Prasad Verma	SP	Usha Verma	INC	Sarvesh Kumar
32	Misrikh	BJP	Anju Bala	BSP	Ashok Kumar Rawat	SP	Jai Prakash	INC	Om Prakash
33	Unnao	BJP	Sakshi Maharaj	BSP	Brajesh Pathak	SP	Arun Shankar Shukla	INC	Annu Tandon
34	Mohanlalganj	BJP	Kaushal Kishore	BSP	R. K. Chaudhary	SP	Sushila Saroj	INC	Narendra Gautam
35	Lucknow	BJP	Rajnath Singh	BSP	Nakul Dubey	SP	Abhishek Misra	INC	Rita Joshi
36	Rae Bareli	BJP	Ajay Agrawal	BSP	Pravesh Singh			INC	Sonia Gandhi
37	Amethi	BJP	Smriti Irani	BSP	Dharmendra Pt. Singh			INC	Rahul Gandhi
38	Sultanpur	BJP	Feroze Varun Gandhi	BSP	Pawan Pandey	SP	Shakeel Ahmed	INC	Ameeta Singh
39	Pratapgarh	AD	Harivansh Singh	BSP	A. Nizamuddin Siddique	SP	Pramod Kumar Patel	INC	Rajkumari Ratna Singh
40	Farrukhabad	BJP	Mukesh Rajput	BSP	Jaiveer Singh	SP	Rameshwar Singh Yadav	INC	Salman Khurshid
41	Etawah	BJP	Ashok Kumar Doharey	BSP	Ajay Pal Singh Jatav	SP	Premdas Kateriya	INC	Hans Mukhi Kori
42	Kannauj	BJP	Subrat Pathak	BSP	Nirmal Tiwari	SP	Dimple Yadav		
43	Kanpur	BJP	Murli Manohar Joshi	BSP	Saleem Ahmad	SP	Surendra Mohan Agarwal	INC	Sriprakash Jaiswal
44	Akbarpur	BJP	Devendra Singh	BSP	Anil Shukla Warsi	SP	Lal Singh Tomar	INC	Rajaram Pal
45	Jalaun	BJP	Bhanu Pratap Verma	BSP	Brijlal Khabri	SP	Ghanshyam Anuragi	INC	Vijay Chaudhari
46	Jhansi	BJP	Uma Bharati	BSP	Anuradha Sharma	SP	Chandrapal Singh Yadav	INC	Pradeep Jain Aditya
47	Hamirpur	BJP	Pushpendra Chandel	BSP	Rakesh Goswami	SP	Vishambhar Nishad	INC	Pritam Singh Lodhi
48	Banda	BJP	Bhairon Prasad Mishra	BSP	R. K. Singh Patel	SP	Bal Kumar Patel	INC	Vivek Kumar Singh
49	Fatehpur	BJP	Niranjan Jyoti	BSP	Afzal Siddiqui	SP	Rakesh Sachan	INC	Usha Maurya
50	Kaushambi	BJP	Vinod Sonkar	BSP	Suresh Pasi	SP	Shailendra Kumar	INC	Mahendra Kumar
51	Phulpur	BJP	Keshav Prasad Maurya	BSP	Kapil Muni Karwariya	SP	Dharmraj Patel	INC	Mohd. Kaif
52	Allahabad	BJP	Shyama Charan Gupta	BSP	Keshari Devi Patel	SP	Rewati Raman Singh	INC	Nand Gopal Gupta
53	Barabanki	BJP	Priyanka Singh Rawat	BSP	Kamla Prasad	SP	Rajrani Rawat	INC	P. L. Punia
54	Faizabad	BJP	Lallu Singh	BSP	Jitendra Kumar Singh	SP	Mitrasen Yadav	INC	Nirmal Khatri
55	Ambedkar Nagar	BJP	Hari Om Pandey	BSP	Rakesh Pandey	SP	Ram Murti Verma	INC	Ashok Singh
56	Bahraich	BJP	Sadhvi Savitri Bai Foole	BSP	Dr. Vijay Kumar	SP	Shabbir Ahmad	INC	Kamal Kishor
57	Kaiserganj	BJP	Brij Bhushan Singh	BSP	Krishna Kumar Ojha	SP	Vinod Kumar	INC	Mukesh Srivastav
58	Shrawasti	BJP	Daddan Mishra	BSP	Lalji Verma	SP	Atiq Ahmed	INC	Vinay Kumar Pandey
59	Gonda	BJP	Kirti Vardhan Singh	BSP	Akbar Ahmad Dumpy	SP	Nandita Shukla	INC	Beni Prasad Verma
60	Domariyaganj	BJP	Jagdambika Pal	BSP	Muhammad Muqeem	SP	Mata Prasad Pandey	INC	Vasundhara
61	Basti	BJP	Harish Dwivedi	BSP	Ram Ps. Chaudhary	SP	Brij Kishor Singh	INC	Ambika Singh
62	Sant Kabir Nagar	BJP	Sharad Tripathi	BSP	Bhishma Tiwari	SP	Bhalchandra Yadava	INC	Rohit Kumar Pandey
63	Maharajganj	BJP	Pankaj	BSP	Kashi Nath Shukla	SP	Akhilesh	INC	Harsh Vardhan
64	Gorakhpur	BJP	Yogi Adityanath	BSP	Rambhual Nishad	SP	Rajmati Nishad	INC	Astbhuja Prasad Tripathi
65	Kushi Nagar	BJP	Rajesh Pandey	BSP	Dr. Sangam Mishra	SP	Radhe Shyam Singh	INC	Ratanjit P. N. Singh
66	Deoria	BJP	Kalraj Mishra	BSP	Niyaj Ahmad	SP	Baleshwar Yadav	INC	Sabha Kunwar
67	Bansgaon	BJP	Kamlesh Paswan	BSP	Sadal Prasad	SP	Gorakh Prasad Paswan	INC	Sanjai Kumar
68	Lalganj	BJP	Neelam Sonkar	BSP	Dr. Baliram	SP	Bechai Saroj	INC	Balihari
69	Azamgarh	BJP	Ramakant Yadav	BSP	Shah Alam	SP	Mulayam Singh Yadav	INC	Arvind Kumar Jaiswal
70	Ghosi	BJP	Harinarayan Rajbhar	BSP	Dara Singh Chauhan	SP	Rajeev Kumar Rai	INC	Rashtra Kunwar Singh
71	Salempur	BJP	Ravindra Kushawaha	BSP	Ravi Shanker Singh	SP	Haribansh S. Kushwaha	INC	Bhola Pandey
72	Ballia	BJP	Bharat Singh	BSP	Virendra Kumar Pathak	SP	Neeraj Shekhar	INC	Sudha Rai
73	Jaunpur	BJP	Krishna Pratap	BSP	Subhash Pandey	SP	Parasnath Yadav	INC	Ravi Kishan
74	Machhlishahr	BJP	Ram Charitra Nishad	BSP	B. P. Saroj	SP	Tufani Saroj	INC	Tufani Nishad
75	Ghazipur	BJP	Manoj Sinha	BSP	Kailash Nath Singh	SP	Shivkanya Kushwaha	INC	Mo. Maksud Khan
76	Chandauli	BJP	Mahendra Nath Pandey	BSP	Anil Kumar Maurya	SP	Ramkishun	INC	Tarun Patel
77	Varanasi	BJP	Narendra Modi	BSP	Vijay Prakash Jaisawal	SP	Kailash Nath Chaurasiya	INC	Ajay Rai
78	Bhadohi	BJP	Virendra Singh Mast	BSP	Rakeshdhar Tripathi	SP	Seema Mishra	INC	Sartaj Imam
79	Mirzapur	AD	Anupriya Singh Patel	BSP	Samudra Bind	SP	Surendra Singh Patel	INC	Lalitesh Pati Tripathi
80	Robertsganj	BJP	Chhotelal	BSP	Sharada Prasad	SP	Pakaudi Lal Kol	INC	Bhagwati Ps. Chaudhary

== Election schedule ==
Constituency wise Election schedule are given below-

Polling Day	Phase	Date	Constituencies	Voting Percentage
1	3	10 April	Saharanpur, Kairana, Muzaffarnagar, Bijnor, Meerut, Baghpat, Ghaziabad, Gautam Buddha Nagar, Bulandshahr, Aligarh	65
2	5	17 April	Nagina, Moradabad, Rampur, Sambhal, Amroha, Badaun, Aonla, Bareilly, Pilibhit, Shahjahanpur, Kheri	62
3	6	24 April	Hathras, Mathura, Agra, Fatehpur Sikri, Firozabad, Mainpuri, Etah, Hardoi, Farrukhabad, Etawah, Kannauj, Akbarpur	60.12
4	7	30 April	Dhaurahra, Sitapur, Misrikh, Unnao, Mohanlalganj, Lucknow, Rae Bareli, Kanpur Urban, Jalaun, Jhansi, Hamirpur, Banda, Fatehpur, Barabanki	57
5	8	7 May	Amethi, Sultanpur, Pratapgarh, Kaushambi, Phulpur, Allahabad, Faizabad, Ambedkar Nagar, Bahraich, Kaiserganj, Shrawasti, Gonda, Basti, Sant Kabir Nagar, Bhadohi	55.5
6	9	12 May	Domariyaganj, Maharajganj, Gorakhpur, Kushi Nagar, Deoria, Bansgaon, Lalganj, Azamgarh, Ghosi, Salempur, Ballia, Jaunpur, Machhlishahr, Ghazipur, Chandauli, Varanasi, Mirzapur, Robertsganj	55.3

== Results ==
Vote Share
1. BJP (42.3%)
2. SP (22.1%)
3. BSP (19.6%)
4. INC (7.40%)
5. RLD (0.80%)
6. Independent (1.74%)
7. AD (1.00%)
8. Other (5.06%)
Seat Share
1. BJP (88.8%)
2. SP (6.25%)
3. INC (2.50%)
4. AD (2.50%)

The BJP won 71 seats, a monumental increase from the 10 seats it won in LS 2009 elections. Bahujan Samaj Party (BSP) which formed government in UP for four times did not win a single seat in this general elections.

=== Results by Party/Alliance ===
Alliance/ Party		Popular vote			Seats		
Alliance/ Party		Votes	%	±pp	Contested	Won	+/−
NDA	BJP	3,43,18,854	42.63	▲24.82	78	71	▲61
NDA	AD	8,12,325	1.00	Steady	2	2	▲2
NDA	Total	3,51,31,179	43.65	Steady	80	73	▲63
SP		1,79,88,967	22.18	▼1.08	78	5	▼18
BSP		1,59,14,194	19.62	▼7.80	80	0	▼20
UPA	INC	60,61,267	7.47	▼10.78	67	2	▼19
UPA	RLD	6,89,409	0.85	▼2.42	8	0	▼5
UPA	MD	22,774	0.03	▼0.16	3	0	Steady
UPA	Total	67,73,450	8.35	Steady	78	2	▼24
Others		32,78,130	4.04	Steady	599	0	Steady
IND		14,14,869	1.74	Steady	373	0	Steady
NOTA		5,92,331	0.73	Steady			
Total		8,10,93,120	100%	-	1,288	80	-

== Constituency Wise Results ==
Keys: BJP (71) SP (5) INC (2) AD (2)

Constituency		Winner				Runner Up				Margin	%
#	Name	Candidate	Party	Votes	%	Candidate	Party	Votes	%	Margin	%
1	Saharanpur	Raghav Lakhanpal	BJP	472,999	39.59	Imran Masood	INC	407,909	34.14	65,090	5.45
2	Kairana	Hukum Singh	BJP	565,909	50.54	Nahid Hasan	SP	329,081	29.39	236,828	21.15
3	Muzaffarnagar	Sanjeev Balyan	BJP	653,391	58.98	Kadir Rana	BSP	252,241	22.77	401,150	36.21
4	Bijnor	Kunwar Bharatendra	BJP	486,913	45.92	Shahnawaz Rana	SP	281,139	26.51	205,774	19.41
5	Nagina (SC)	Yashwant Singh	BJP	367,825	39.02	Yashvir Singh	SP	275,435	29.22	92,390	9.80
6	Moradabad	Kunwer Sarvesh Kumar	BJP	485,224	43.01	Dr. S. T. Hasan	SP	397,720	35.26	87,504	7.75
7	Rampur	Dr. Nepal Singh	BJP	358,616	37.42	Naseer Ahmad Khan	SP	335,181	34.98	23,435	2.44
8	Sambhal	Satyapal Singh	BJP	360,242	34.08	Shafiqur Rahman Barq	SP	355,068	33.59	5,174	0.49
9	Amroha	Kanwar Singh Tanwar	BJP	528,880	48.26	Humera Akhtar	SP	370,666	33.82	158,214	14.44
10	Meerut	Rajendra Agarwal	BJP	532,981	47.86	Mohd. Shahid Akhlak	BSP	300,655	27	232,326	20.86
11	Baghpat	Dr. Satya Pal Singh	BJP	423,475	42.15	Ghulam Mohammed	SP	213,609	21.26	209,866	20.89
12	Ghaziabad	Vijay Kumar Singh	BJP	758,482	56.50	Raj Babbar	INC	191,222	14.24	567,260	42.26
13	G. B. Nagar	Dr. Mahesh Sharma	BJP	599,702	50	Narendra Bhati	SP	319,490	26.64	280,212	23.36
14	Bulandshahr (SC)	Bhola Singh	BJP	604,449	59.83	Pradeep Kumar Jatav	BSP	182,476	18.06	421,973	41.77
15	Aligarh	Satish Kumar	BJP	514,622	48.34	Dr. Arvind Kumar Singh	BSP	227,886	21.40	286,736	26.94
16	Hathras (SC)	Rajesh Kumar Diwaker	BJP	544,277	51.87	Manoj Kumar Soni	BSP	217,891	20.77	326,386	31.10
17	Mathura	Hema Malini	BJP	574,633	53.29	Jayant Chaudhary	RLD	243,890	22.62	330,743	30.67
18	Agra (SC)	Ram Katheria	BJP	583,716	54.53	Narayan Singh Suman	BSP	283,453	26.48	300,263	28.05
19	Fatehpur Sikri	Babulal	BJP	426,589	44.06	Seema Upadhyay	BSP	253,483	26.18	173,106	17.88
20	Firozabad	Akshay Yadav	SP	534,583	48.39	S. P. Singh Baghel	BJP	420,524	38.07	114,059	10.32
21	Mainpuri	Mulayam Singh Yadav	SP	595,918	59.63	S. S. Chauhan	BJP	231,252	23.14	364,666	36.49
22	Etah	Rajveer Singh	BJP	474,978	51.28	Devendra Singh Yadav	SP	273,977	29.58	201,001	21.70
23	Badaun	Dharmendra Yadav	SP	498,378	48.50	Vagish Pathak	BJP	332,031	32.31	166,347	16.19
24	Aonla	Dharmendra Kumar	BJP	409,907	41.16	Kunwar Sarvraj Singh	SP	271,478	27.26	138,429	13.90
25	Bareilly	Santosh Kumar Gangwar	BJP	518,258	50.90	Ayesha Islam	SP	277,573	27.26	240,685	23.64
26	Pilibhit	Maneka Sanjay Gandhi	BJP	546,934	52.06	Budhsen Verma	SP	239,882	22.83	307,052	29.23
27	Shahjahanpur (SC)	Krishna Raj	BJP	525,132	46.45	Umed Singh Kashyap	BSP	289,603	25.62	235,529	20.83
28	Kheri	Ajay Kumar	BJP	398,578	36.98	Arvind Giri	BSP	288,304	26.75	110,274	10.23
29	Dhaurahra	Rekha	BJP	360,357	33.99	Daud Ahmad	BSP	234,682	22.13	125,675	11.86
30	Sitapur	Rajesh Verma	BJP	417,546	40.66	Kaiser Jahan	BSP	366,519	35.69	51,027	4.97
31	Hardoi (SC)	Anshul Verma	BJP	360,501	37.05	Shive Prasad Verma	BSP	279,158	28.69	81,343	8.36
32	Misrikh (SC)	Anju Bala	BJP	412,575	41.33	Ashok Kumar Rawat	BSP	325,212	32.58	87,363	8.75
33	Unnao	Sakshi Maharaj	BJP	518,834	43.17	Arun Shankar Shukla	SP	208,661	17.36	310,173	25.81
34	Mohanlalganj (SC)	Kaushal Kishore	BJP	455,274	40.77	R. K. Chaudhary	BSP	309,858	27.75	145,416	13.02
35	Lucknow	Rajnath Singh	BJP	561,106	54.23	Rita Joshi	INC	288,357	27.87	272,749	26.36
36	Rae Bareli	Sonia Gandhi	INC	526,434	63.80	Ajay Agrawal	BJP	173,721	21.05	352,713	42.75
37	Amethi	Rahul Gandhi	INC	408,651	46.71	Smriti Irani	BJP	300,748	34.38	107,903	12.33
38	Sultanpur	Feroze Varun Gandhi	BJP	410,348	42.51	Pawan Pandey	BSP	231,446	23.98	178,902	18.53
39	Pratapgarh	Kuwar Harivansh Singh	AD	375,789	42.01	Asif Nizamuddin Siddique	BSP	207,567	23.20	168,222	18.81
40	Farrukhabad	Mukesh Rajput	BJP	406,195	41.84	Rameshwar Singh Yadav	SP	255,693	26.34	150,502	15.50
41	Etawah (SC)	Ashok Kumar Doharey	BJP	439,646	46.78	Premdas Kateriya	SP	266,700	28.38	172,946	18.40
42	Kannauj	Dimple Yadav	SP	489,164	43.89	Subrat Pathak	BJP	469,257	42.10	19,907	1.79
43	Kanpur	Murli Manohar Joshi	BJP	474,712	56.84	Sriprakash Jaiswal	INC	251,766	30.15	222,946	26.69
44	Akbarpur	Devendra Singh	BJP	481,584	49.57	Anil Shukla Warsi	BSP	202,587	20.85	278,997	28.72
45	Jalaun (SC)	Bhanu Pratap Verma	BJP	548,631	49.46	Brijlal Khabri	BSP	261,429	23.57	287,202	25.89
46	Jhansi	Uma Bharati	BJP	575,889	43.60	Chandrapal Yadav	SP	385,422	29.18	190,467	14.42
47	Hamirpur	Pushpendra Chandel	BJP	453,884	46.41	Vishambhar Nishad	SP	187,096	19.13	266,788	27.28
48	Banda	Bhairon Prasad Mishra	BJP	342,066	39.84	R. K. Singh Patel	BSP	226,278	26.35	115,788	13.49
49	Fatehpur	Niranjan Jyoti	BJP	485,994	45.97	Afzal Siddiqui	BSP	298,788	28.26	187,206	17.71
50	Kaushambi (SC)	Vinod Kumar Sonkar	BJP	331,724	36.43	Shailendra Kumar	SP	288,824	31.72	42,900	4.71
51	Phulpur	Keshav Prasad Maurya	BJP	503,564	52.43	Dharam Raj Singh Patel	SP	195,256	20.33	308,308	32.10
52	Allahabad	Shyama Charan Gupta	BJP	313,772	35.19	Rewati Raman Singh	SP	251,763	28.24	62,009	6.95
53	Barabanki (SC)	Priyanka Singh Rawat	BJP	454,214	42.52	P. L. Punia	INC	242,336	22.69	211,878	19.83
54	Faizabad	Lallu Singh	BJP	491,761	48.08	Mitrasen Yadav	SP	208,986	20.43	282,775	27.65
55	Ambedkar Nagar	Hari Om Pandey	BJP	432,104	41.77	Rakesh Pandey	BSP	292,675	28.29	139,429	13.48
56	Bahraich (SC)	Sadhvi Savitri Bai Foole	BJP	432,392	46.28	Shabbir Ahmad	SP	336,747	36.04	95,645	10.24
57	Kaiserganj	Brij Bhushan Singh	BJP	381,500	40.44	Vinod Kumar	SP	303,282	32.15	78,218	8.29
58	Shrawasti	Daddan Mishra	BJP	345,964	35.30	Atiq Ahmad	SP	260,051	26.53	85,913	8.77
59	Gonda	Kirti Vardhan Singh	BJP	359,639	41.15	Nandita Shukla	SP	199,227	22.80	160,412	18.35
60	Domariyaganj	Jagdambika Pal	BJP	298,845	31.96	Muhammad Muqeem	BSP	195,257	20.88	103,588	11.08
61	Basti	Harish Dwivedi	BJP	357,680	34.11	Brij Kishor Singh	SP	324,118	30.91	33,562	3.20
62	Sant Kabir Nagar	Sharad Tripathi	BJP	348,892	34.47	Bhism Shankar	BSP	250,914	24.79	97,978	9.68
63	Maharajganj	Pankaj	BJP	471,542	44.47	Kashi Nath Shukla	BSP	231,084	21.80	240,458	22.67
64	Gorakhpur	Adityanath	BJP	539,127	51.80	Rajmati Nishad	SP	226,344	21.75	312,783	30.05
65	Kushi Nagar	Rajesh Pandey	BJP	370,051	38.92	Ratanjit Pratap Singh	INC	284,511	29.92	85,540	9.00
66	Deoria	Kalraj Mishra	BJP	496,500	51.07	Niyaj Ahmad	BSP	231,114	23.77	265,386	27.30
67	Bansgaon (SC)	Kamlesh Paswan	BJP	417,959	47.61	Sadal Prasad	BSP	228,443	26.02	189,516	21.59
68	Lalganj (SC)	Neelam Sonkar	BJP	324,016	36.02	Bechai Saroj	SP	260,930	29.01	63,086	7.01
69	Azamgarh	Mulayam Singh Yadav	SP	340,306	35.43	Ramakant Yadav	BJP	277,102	28.85	63,204	6.58
70	Ghosi	Harinarayan Rajbhar	BJP	379,797	36.52	Dara Singh Chauhan	BSP	233,782	22.48	146,015	14.04
71	Salempur	Ravindra Kushawaha	BJP	392,213	45.83	Ravi Shanker Singh	BSP	159,871	18.68	232,342	27.15
72	Ballia	Bharat Singh	BJP	359,758	38.18	Neeraj Shekhar	SP	220,324	23.38	139,434	14.80
73	Jaunpur	Krishna Pratap	BJP	367,149	36.45	Subhash Pandey	BSP	220,839	21.93	146,310	14.52
74	Machhlishahr (SC)	Ram Charitra Nishad	BJP	438,210	43.91	B. P. Saroj	BSP	266,055	26.66	172,155	17.25
75	Ghazipur	Manoj Sinha	BJP	306,929	31.11	Shivkanya Kushwaha	SP	274,477	27.82	32,452	3.29
76	Chandauli	Mahendra Nath Pandey	BJP	414,135	42.23	Anil Kumar Maurya	BSP	257,379	26.25	156,756	15.98
77	Varanasi	Narendra Modi	BJP	581,022	56.37	Arvind Kejriwal	AAP	209,238	20.30	371,784	36.07
78	Bhadohi	Virendra Singh	BJP	403,695	41.10	Rakesh Dhar Tripathi	BSP	245,554	25.00	158,141	16.10
79	Mirzapur	Anupriya Singh Patel	AD	436,536	43.32	Samudra Bind	BSP	217,457	21.58	219,079	21.74
80	Robertsganj (SC)	Chhotelal	BJP	378,211	42.69	Sharada Prasad	BSP	187,725	21.19	190,486	21.50

== Post-election Union Council of Ministers from Uttar Pradesh ==
=== Cabinet Ministers ===
#	Name	Constituency	Designation	Department	From	To	Party
1	Narendra Modi	Varanasi	Prime Minister	Personnel, Public Grievances and Pensions; Space; Atomic Energy	26 May 2014	30 May 2019	BJP
2	Rajnath Singh	Lucknow	Cabinet Minister	Home Affairs	27 May 2014	30 May 2019	BJP
3	Uma Bharati	Jhansi	Cabinet Minister	Water Resources, River Development and Ganga Rejuvenation	27 May 2014	3 Sep 2017	BJP
3	Uma Bharati	Jhansi	Cabinet Minister	Drinking Water and Sanitation	3 Sep 2017	30 May 2019	BJP
4	Maneka Gandhi	Pilibhit	Cabinet Minister	Women and Child Development	27 May 2014	30 May 2019	BJP
5	Kalraj Mishra	Deoria	Cabinet Minister	Micro, Small and Medium Enterprises	27 May 2014	3 Sep 2017	BJP
6	Manohar Parrikar	Rajya Sabha (Uttar Pradesh)	Cabinet Minister	Defence	9 Nov 2014	13 March 2017	BJP
7	Arun Jaitley	Rajya Sabha (Uttar Pradesh)	Cabinet Minister	Finance; Corporate Affairs	3 April 2018	30 May 2019	BJP

- Note: Arun Jaitley represented Gujarat in the Rajya Sabha until 2 April 2018. He represented Uttar Pradesh for the remainder of the term

=== Minister of State (Independent Charge) ===
#	Name	Constituency	Designation	Department	From	To	Party
1	Santosh Kumar Gangwar	Bareilly	MoS (I/C)	Textiles	27 May 2014	5 July 2016	BJP
1	Santosh Kumar Gangwar	Bareilly	MoS (I/C)	Labour and Employment	3 Sep 2017	30 May 2019	BJP
2	Mahesh Sharma	Gautam Buddha Nagar	MoS (I/C)	Culture	9 Nov 2014	30 May 2019	BJP
2	Mahesh Sharma	Gautam Buddha Nagar	MoS (I/C)	Tourism	9 Nov 2014	3 Sep 2017	BJP
3	Manoj Sinha	Ghazipur	MoS (I/C)	Communications	5 July 2016	30 May 2019	BJP
4	V. K. Singh	Ghaziabad	MoS (I/C)	Development of North Eastern Region	27 May 2014	9 Nov 2014	BJP
4	V. K. Singh	Ghaziabad	MoS (I/C)	Statistics and Programme Implementation	9 Nov 2014	5 July 2016	BJP
5	Hardeep Singh Puri	Rajya Sabha (Uttar Pradesh)	MoS (I/C)	Housing and Urban Affairs	3 Sep 2017	30 May 2019	BJP

=== Minister of State ===
#	Name	Constituency	Designation	Department	From	To	Party
1	Santosh Kumar Gangwar	Bareilly	MoS	Finance	5 July 2016	3 Sep 2017	BJP
1	Santosh Kumar Gangwar	Bareilly	MoS	Parliamentary Affairs	27 May 2014	9 Nov 2014	BJP
1	Santosh Kumar Gangwar	Bareilly	MoS	Water Resources, River Development and Ganga Rejuvenation	27 May 2014	9 Nov 2014	BJP
2	Mahesh Sharma	Gautam Buddha Nagar	MoS	Civil Aviation	9 Nov 2014	5 July 2016	BJP
2	Mahesh Sharma	Gautam Buddha Nagar	MoS	Environment, Forest and Climate Change	3 Sep 2017	30 May 2019	BJP
3	Manoj Sinha	Ghazipur	MoS	Railways	27 May 2014	30 May 2019	BJP
4	V. K. Singh	Ghaziabad	MoS	External Affairs	27 May 2014	30 May 2019	BJP
4	V. K. Singh	Ghaziabad	MoS	Overseas Indian Affairs	27 May 2014	7 Jan 2016	BJP
5	Sanjeev Balyan	Muzaffarnagar	MoS	Agriculture (renamed Agriculture and Farmers' Welfare)	27 May 2014	3 Sep 2017	BJP
5	Sanjeev Balyan	Muzaffarnagar	MoS	Food Processing Industries	27 May 2014	9 Nov 2014	BJP
5	Sanjeev Balyan	Muzaffarnagar	MoS	Water Resources, River Development and Ganga Rejuvenation	5 July 2016	3 Sep 2017	BJP
6	Niranjan Jyoti	Fatehpur	MoS	Food Processing Industries	9 Nov 2014	30 May 2019	BJP
7	Ram Shankar Katheria	Agra (SC)	MoS	Human Resource Development	9 Nov 2014	5 July 2016	BJP
8	Mahendra Nath Pandey	Chandauli	MoS	Human Resource Development	5 July 2016	3 Sep 2017	BJP
9	Krishna Raj	Shahjahanpur (SC)	MoS	Women and Child Development	5 July 2016	3 Sep 2017	BJP
9	Krishna Raj	Shahjahanpur (SC)	MoS	Agriculture and Farmers' Welfare	3 Sep 2017	30 May 2019	BJP
10	Shiv Pratap Shukla	Rajya Sabha (Uttar Pradesh)	MoS	Finance	3 Sep 2017	30 May 2019	BJP
11	Satya Pal Singh	Baghpat	MoS	Human Resource Development	3 Sep 2017	30 May 2019	BJP
11	Satya Pal Singh	Baghpat	MoS	Water Resources, River Development and Ganga Rejuvenation	3 Sep 2017	30 May 2019	BJP
12	Mukhtar Abbas Naqvi	Rajya Sabha (Uttar Pradesh)	MoS	Parliamentary Affairs	9 Nov 2014	3 Sep 2017	BJP
12	Mukhtar Abbas Naqvi	Rajya Sabha (Uttar Pradesh)	MoS	Minority Affairs	9 Nov 2014	12 July 2016	BJP
13	Anupriya Singh Patel	Mirzapur	MoS	Health and Family Welfare	5 July 2016	30 May 2019	AD(S)

- Note: Mukhtar Abbas Naqvi represented Uttar Pradesh in the Rajya Sabha until 2016. He was re-elected to the Rajya Sabha from Jharkhand on 8 July 2016.

== Assembly segments wise lead of Parties ==
Party	Assembly segments	Position in Assembly (as of 2017 election)
Bharatiya Janata Party	328	312
Bahujan Samaj Party	9	19
Samajwadi Party	42	47
Apna Dal (Soneylal)	9	9
Indian National Congress	15	7
Others	0	9
Total	403	

== Region-wise Results ==
Region	Total seats	Bharatiya Janata Party		Samajwadi Party		Indian National Congress		Bahujan Samaj Party		Others
Bundelkhand	4	4	▲4	0	▼2	0	▼1	0	▼1	0
Central Uttar Pradesh	24	20	▲19	1	▼6	2	▼10	0	▼4	1
North-East Uttar Pradesh	17	16	▲13	1	▼1	0	▼6	0	▼6	0
Rohilkhand	10	9	▲7	1	▼3	0	▼2	0	▼1	0
South-East Uttar Pradesh	8	7	▲6	0	▼5	0	Steady	0	▼2	1
West Uttar Pradesh	17	15	▲12	2	▼1	0	Steady	0	▼6	0
Total	80	71	▲61	5	▼18	2	▼19	0	▼20	2
