= Baij Nath Rawat =

Indian politician

Member of Uttar Pradesh Legislative Assembly
- In office 1991–1993
- Preceded by: Ratan Lal
- Succeeded by: self- established seat
- Constituency: Siddhaur
- In office 1993–1996
- Succeeded by: Kamla Prasad Rawat

Member of 17th Uttar Pradesh Assembly
- In office 25 March 2017 – 10 March 2022
- Preceded by: Ram Magan
- Succeeded by: Dinesh Rawat
- Constituency: Haidergarh

Minister of State, Energy, Uttar Pradesh
- In office August 1992 – December 1992

Member of Parliament, Lok Sabha
- In office 1998–1999
- Preceded by: Ram Sagar Rawat
- Succeeded by: Ram Sagar Rawat
- Constituency: Barabanki Lok Sabha constituency

Personal details
- Born: 25 January 1954 (age 72) Bhulbhuliya Village, Barabanki, Uttar Pradesh, India
- Party: Bharatiya Janata Party
- Spouse: Gita rani
- Children: Three sons Three daughters
- Parent: Rajaram (father)
- Education: Kanpur University (Post graduate); Lucknow University (M.A, L. L.B)
- Profession: Politician; Agriculturist

Baij Nath Rawat (born 25 January 1954) is an Indian politician and was the former Member of Parliament, Lok Sabha from Barabanki Lok Sabha constituency from 1998 to 1999.

He previously served as a member of the 17th Uttar Pradesh Legislative Assembly and previously represented the Haidergarh Assembly constituency as an MLA from 2017 to 2022.

== Early life ==
Rawat was born to Rajaram in year 1954.

== Education ==
Rawat has a postgraduate degree from Kanpur University and a master's in M.A. and L.L.B. from Lucknow University.

== Personal life ==
Rawat was married to Gita Rani in 1975, and Rawat's family has three sons and three daughters.

Rawat's main occupation is agriculture, in addition to being a politician.

== Political career ==
In the following 2017 Uttar Pradesh Legislative Assembly election on, Baij Nath Rawat of the Bharatiya Janata Party won the seat by defeating Rammagan Rawat of the Samajwadi Party by a margin of 33,520 votes.

On September 27, 2024, Uttar Pradesh Chief Minister Yogi Adityanath appointed Rawat was the President of Uttar Pradesh SC/ST Commission.
