= Barabanki Lok Sabha constituency =

Lok Sabha Constituency in Uttar Pradesh

Coordinates: 26.9°N 81.2°E

Barabanki UP-41
- Lok Sabha constituency
- Interactive Map Outlining Barabanki Lok Sabha constituency

Constituency details
- Country: India
- Region: North India
- State: Uttar Pradesh
- Assembly constituencies: Kursi; Ram Nagar; Barabanki; Zaidpur; Haidergarh
- Established: 1952
- Reservation: SC

Member of Parliament
- 18th Lok Sabha
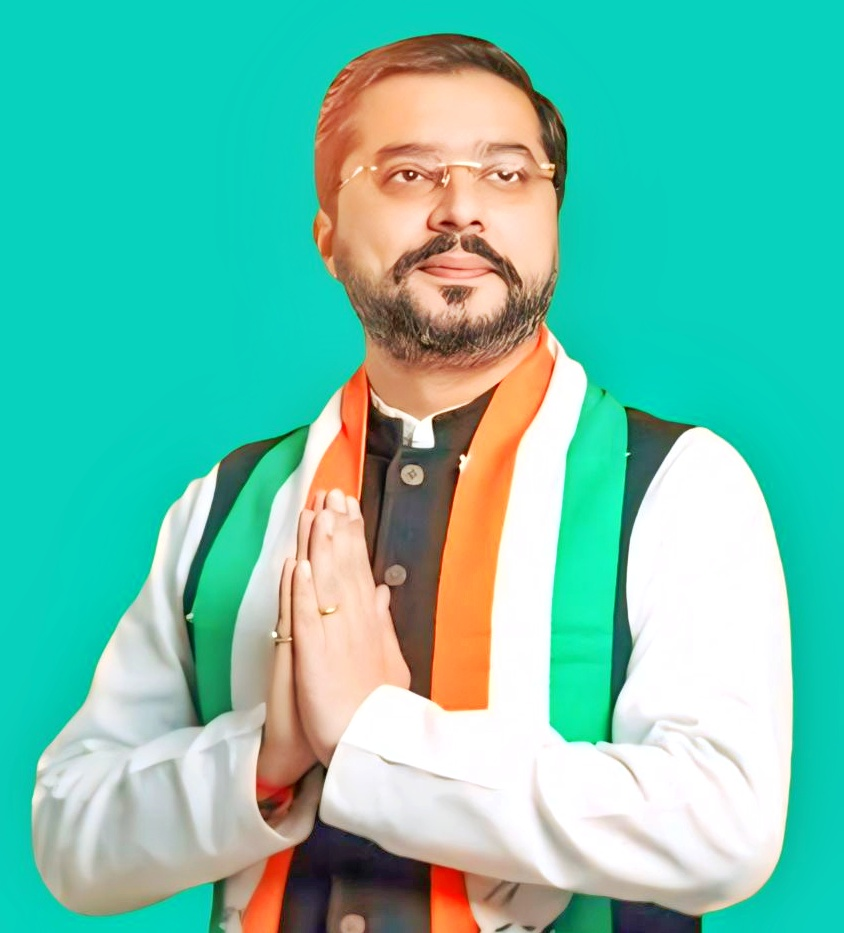
- Incumbent Tanuj Punia
- Party: Indian National Congress
- Elected year: 2024

Barabanki Lok Sabha constituency (formerly known as Bara Banki Lok Sabha constituency) is one of the 80 Lok Sabha (parliamentary) constituencies in Uttar Pradesh state in northern India.

== Assembly segments ==
Presently, Barabanki Lok Sabha constituency comprises six Vidhan Sabha (legislative assembly) segments. These are:

No	Name	District	Member	Party	2024 Lead
266	Kursi	Barabanki	Sakendra Pratap Verma	BJP	INC
267	Ram Nagar	Barabanki	Fareed Mahfooz Kidwai	SP	INC
268	Barabanki	Barabanki	Dharmraj Singh Yadav	SP	INC
269	Zaidpur (SC)	Barabanki	Gaurav Kumar	SP	INC
272	Haidergarh (SC)	Barabanki	Dinesh Rawat	BJP	INC

== Members of Parliament ==
Following is the list of MPs from Barabanki:

Year	Member	Party
1952	Mohanlal Saksena	Indian National Congress
1957	Ram Sewak Yadav	Independent politician
1957	Swami Ramanand Shastri	Independent politician
1962	Ram Sewak Yadav	Socialist Party of India
1967	Ram Sewak Yadav	Samyukta Socialist Party
1971	Rudra Pratap Singh	Indian National Congress
1977	Ram Kinkar	Janata Party
1980	Ram Kinkar	Janata Party (Secular)
1984	Kamla Prasad Rawat	Indian National Congress
1989	Ram Sagar Rawat	Janata Dal
1991	Ram Sagar Rawat	Janata Party
1996	Ram Sagar Rawat	Samajwadi Party
1998	Baij Nath Rawat	Bharatiya Janata Party
1999	Ram Sagar Rawat	Samajwadi Party
2004	Kamla Prasad Rawat	Bahujan Samaj Party
2009	P. L. Punia	Indian National Congress
2014	Priyanka Singh Rawat	Bharatiya Janata Party
2019	Upendra Singh Rawat	Bharatiya Janata Party
2024	Tanuj Punia	Indian National Congress

== Election results ==
=== General election 2024 ===
2024 Indian general elections: Barabanki
Party	Candidate	Votes	%	±%
INC	Tanuj Punia	719,927	55.78	▲41.96
BJP	Rajrani Rawat	5,04,223	39.07	▼7.32
BSP	Shiv Kumar Doharey	39,177	3.04	▲3.04
NOTA	None of the Above	8,221	0.64	▼0.12
Margin of victory		2,15,704	16.71	▲7.17
Turnout		12,90,634	67.27	▲3.66
INC gain from BJP		Swing		

=== General election 2019 ===
2019 Indian general elections: Barabanki
Party	Candidate	Votes	%	±%
BJP	Upendra Singh Rawat	535,594	46.39	
SP	Ram Sagar Rawat	4,25,624	36.85	
INC	Tanuj Punia	1,59,575	13.82	
NOTA	None of the above	8,783	0.76	
Margin of victory		1,09,970	9.54	
Turnout		11,55,708	63.61	
BJP hold		Swing		

=== General election 2014 ===
2014 Indian general elections: Barabanki
Party	Candidate	Votes	%	±%
BJP	Priyanka Singh Rawat	454,214	42.52	
INC	Panna Lal Punia	2,42,336	22.69	
BSP	Kamla Prasad Rawat	1,67,150	15.65	
SP	Rajrani Rawat	1,59,284	14.91	
PECP	Rajesh Kumar Vidyarthi	7,980	0.75	
NOTA	None of the above	8,726	0.82	
Margin of victory		2,11,878	19.83	
Turnout		10,68,169	62.06	
BJP gain from INC		Swing		

== See also ==
- Barabanki district
- List of constituencies of the Lok Sabha
