= Electoral history of Arvind Kejriwal =

Elections featuring Chief Minister of Delhi

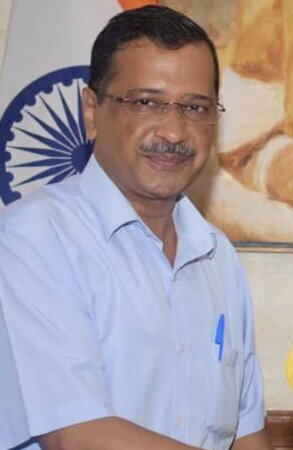
Arvind Kejriwal

This is a summary of the electoral history of Arvind Kejriwal, who served as the seventh chief minister of Delhi from December 2013 to February 2014 and again February 2015 to September 2024.

== Summary ==
=== Lok Sabha elections ===
Year	Constituency	Party	Votes	%	Opponent		Result	Margin
2014	Varanasi	AAP	209,238	20.30	BJP	Narendra Modi	Lost	371,784

=== Delhi Legislative Assembly elections ===
Year	Constituency	Party	Votes	%	Opponent		Result	Margin
2013	New Delhi	AAP	44,269	53.46	INC	Sheila Dikshit	Won	25,864
2015	New Delhi	AAP	57,213	64.34	BJP	Nupur Sharma	Won	31,583
2020	New Delhi	AAP	46,758	61.10	BJP	Sunil Kumar Yadav	Won	21,697
2025	New Delhi	AAP	25,999	42.18	BJP	Parvesh Verma	Lost	4,089

== Detailed results ==
=== Lok Sabha elections ===
==== 2014 ====
2014 Indian general elections: Varanasi
Party	Candidate	Votes	%	±%
BJP	Narendra Modi	581,022	56.37	▲25.85
AAP	Arvind Kejriwal	209,238	20.30	New
INC	Ajay Rai	75,614	7.34	▼2.64
BSP	Vijay Prakash Jaiswal	60,579	5.88	▼22.06
SP	Kailash Chaurasiya	45,291	4.39	▼14.22
AITC	Indira Tiwari	2,674	0.26	New
NOTA	None of the above	2,051	0.20	New
Majority		371,784	36.07	▲33.49
Turnout		1,030,812	58.35	▲15.74
Registered electors		1,767,486		
BJP hold		Swing	▲25.85	

=== Delhi Legislative Assembly elections ===
==== 2013 ====
Assembly Election 2013: New Delhi
Party	Candidate	Votes	%	±%
AAP	Arvind Kejriwal	44,269	53.46	New
INC	Sheila Dikshit	18,405	22.23	−29.97
BJP	Vijender Gupta	17,952	21.68	−12.17
BSP	Ritu Singh	605	0.73	−7.38
NOTA	None of the above	460	0.56	
Majority		25,864	31.24	+12.89
Turnout		83,059	66.93	
AAP gain from INC		Swing	+41.72	

==== 2015 ====
Assembly Election 2015: New Delhi
Party	Candidate	Votes	%	±%
AAP	Arvind Kejriwal	57,213	64.34	+10.88
BJP	Nupur Sharma	25,630	28.81	+7.13
INC	Kiran Walia	4,781	5.37	−16.86
NOTA	None of the Above	465	0.52	−0.04
Majority		31,583	35.51	+4.27
Turnout		89,265	64.72	
Registered electors		1,37,294		
AAP hold		Swing	+10.88	

==== 2020 ====
Assembly Election 2020: New Delhi
Party	Candidate	Votes	%	±%
AAP	Arvind Kejriwal	46,758	61.10	−3.24
BJP	Sunil Kumar Yadav	25,061	32.75	+3.94
INC	Romesh Sabharwal	3,220	4.21	−1.16
NOTA	None of the Above	395	0.52	−
Majority		21,697	28.35	−7.16
Turnout		76,645	52.45	−12.27
Registered electors		1,08,574		
AAP hold		Swing	-3.24	

==== 2025 ====
Delhi Assembly elections, 2025: New Delhi
Party	Candidate	Votes	%	±%
BJP	Parvesh Verma	30,088	48.82	▲16.07
AAP	Arvind Kejriwal	25,999	42.18	▼18.92
INC	Sandeep Dikshit	4,568	7.41	▲3.20
NOTA	None of the Above	314	0.51	▼0.01
Majority		4,089	6.64	
Turnout		61,636		
BJP gain from AAP		Swing		
