= Arvind Kumar Singh (Samajwadi Party politician) =

Indian politician

Arvind Kumar Singh 'Gope'

Minister of Rural Development Government of Uttar Pradesh
- In office 2012–2017

Member of Legislative Assembly
- In office 2012–2017
- Preceded by: Rajendra Prasad Chaudhary
- Succeeded by: Sharad Kumar Awasthi
- Constituency: Ramnagar

Minister of State Government of Uttar Pradesh
- In office 2003–2007

Member of Legislative Assembly
- In office 2003–2012
- Preceded by: Rajnath Singh
- Succeeded by: Ram Magan
- Constituency: Haidergarh

Personal details
- Born: Barabanki
- Party: Samajwadi Party
- Spouse: Mrs Renu Singh
- Children: 2

Arvind Kumar Singh is an Indian politician from the Samajwadi Party. He is a three-time MLA and was a cabinet minister in the Uttar Pradesh government. He hails from Barabanki.

He is currently serving as the National Secretary of the Samajwadi Party.

Singh completed his LLB at University of Lucknow and was its former president of student union.

Singh was also the state general secretary of Samajwadi Party.
