= Rudra Pratap Singh (politician) =

Indian politician

Raja Dr. Rudra Pratap Singh

Member of Parliament, Lok Sabha
- In office 1971–1977
- Preceded by: Ram Sewak Yadav
- Succeeded by: Ram Kinkar
- Constituency: Barabanki, Uttar Pradesh

Member of Parliament, Rajya Sabha
- In office 1980–1992
- Constituency: Uttar Pradesh

Personal details
- Born: 12 May 1936 Jamo, Sultanpur District, United Provinces, British India (present-day Uttar Pradesh, India)
- Party: Indian National Congress
- Spouse: Rudra Kumari Singh
- Relations: Akshay Pratap Singh (nephew)
- Children: Raja Ravi Pratap Singh
- Pretender information
- Title(s): Raja of Jamo
- Throne(s) claimed: Jamo
- Pretend from: ?–2015
- Monarchy abolished: Sovereign Monarchy; 1947 (Instrument of Accession); Titular Monarchy; 1971 (26th Amendment of the Indian Constitution)
- Last monarch: Raja Umaraman Pratap Singh
- Successor: Raja Ravi Pratap Singh

Raja Dr. Rudra Pratap Singh (Raja Jamo Estate) is an Indian politician. He belonged to Jamo estate of ancient UP. He was MLA from Gauriganj in 1962. He was elected to the Lok Sabha, the lower house of the Parliament of India from the Barabanki, Uttar Pradesh constituency of Uttar Pradesh as a member of the Indian National Congress.
