= Gaurav Kumar (politician) =

Indian politician

Gaurav Kumar Rawat

Member of Uttar Pradesh Legislative Assembly
- Incumbent
- Assumed office October 2019
- Preceded by: Upendra Singh Rawat
- Constituency: Zaidpur

Personal details
- Born: June 15, 1984 (age 41) Barabanki, Uttar Pradesh
- Party: Samajwadi Party
- Profession: Politician

Gaurav Kumar is an Indian politician in the Samajwadi Party. He was elected as a member of the Uttar Pradesh Legislative Assembly from Zaidpur on 24 October 2019.
