= Zaidpur Assembly constituency =

Constituency of the Uttar Pradesh legislative assembly in India

Coordinates: 26.83°N 81.33°E

Zaidpur
- Constituency No. 269 for the Uttar Pradesh Legislative Assembly

Constituency details
- Country: India
- Region: North India
- State: Uttar Pradesh
- District: Barabanki
- Lok Sabha constituency: Barabanki
- Total electors: 3,96,995
- Reservation: SC

Member of Legislative Assembly
- 18th Uttar Pradesh Legislative Assembly
- Incumbent Gaurav Kumar Rawat
- Party: Samajwadi Party
- Elected year: 2022
- Preceded by: Upendra Singh Rawat

Zaidpur is a constituency of the Uttar Pradesh Legislative Assembly covering the city of Zaidpur in the Barabanki district of Uttar Pradesh, India.

Zaidpur is one of five assembly constituencies in the Barabanki Lok Sabha constituency. Since 2008, this assembly constituency is numbered 269 amongst 403 constituencies. It is reserved for Scheduled Caste candidates, although Muslims make up a large fraction of the electorate.

== History ==
Mir Mukhlis Hussain Rizvi- (1795–1857) was an Awadhi nobleman, collector, and adviser who served in the court of Nawab Wajid Ali Shah, the last Nawab of Awadh. According to Shajraat-e-Tayyebaat by Syed Alim Mehdi, Rizvi was a senior member of the Nawab's court and held the honorific titles Raees-e-Zaidpur and Raees-e-Aazam. He is chiefly remembered for establishing the Imambargah Hussainiya Mir Mukhlis Hussain Rizvi in Zaidpur.

Early life and education

According to Shajraat-e-Tayyebaat, Mir Mukhlis Hussain Rizvi was born in Zaidpur in 1795. He received his education at a local British school in Lucknow before entering public service in the Kingdom of Awadh.

Career

Rizvi served as a collector and adviser to Nawab Wajid Ali Shah and was regarded as a senior member of the royal court. During his service, he is said to have participated in the administration of the Kingdom of Awadh and was recognized with the honorific titles Raees-e-Zaidpur and Raees-e-Aazam.

Imambargah Hussainiya

Rizvi is credited with establishing the Imambargah Hussainiya Mir Mukhlis Hussain Rizvi in Zaidpur in 1830, which became an important centre for religious gatherings and Muharram commemorations.

According to Shajraat-e-Tayyebaat, Nawab Wajid Ali Shah presented Rizvi with a ceremonial Alam cloth in 1855. The cloth was crafted in the traditional Awadhi style using gold and silver threadwork embellished with gemstones and was intended for use during Shia religious observances.

Death

According to Shajraat-e-Tayyebaat, Rizvi was killed in 1857 following the Indian Rebellion. The work states that he was shot by British soldiers while offering namaz (Islamic prayer) on Victoria Street in Lucknow. It further attributes the action to orders issued by Lord Dalhousie.

Family

Mir Mukhlis Hussain Rizvi's father was Imam Baqsh. Imam Baqsh was a Religious man his grave is in the grand and famous maqbara in Zaidpur. Mir Mukhlis Hussain has one son, Ali Yousef, and Ali Yousef has 4 sons one of the major son in Ali Zaheer he had 1 son Ali Sagheer through whom his descendants continued. Currently, his descendants live in Zaidpur.

Legacy

Mir Mukhlis Hussain Rizvi is remembered for his association with the court of Nawab Wajid Ali Shah, his contribution to the religious and cultural heritage of Zaidpur through the establishment of the Imambargah Hussainiya, and his place in the local history of Awadh.

References Shajraat-e-Tayyebaat.

== List of MLAs ==
Year	Member	Party
2012	Ram Gopal Rawat	Samajwadi Party
2017	Upendra Singh Rawat	Bharatiya Janata Party
2019^	Gaurav Kumar Rawat	Samajwadi Party
2022	Gaurav Kumar Rawat	Samajwadi Party

^ byelection

== Election results ==
=== 2027 ===
2027 Uttar Pradesh Legislative Assembly election: Zaidpur
Party	Candidate	Votes	%	±%
INDIA				
NDA				
BSP				
NOTA	None of the above			
Majority				
Turnout				
gain from		Swing		

=== 2022 ===
2022 Uttar Pradesh Legislative Assembly election: Zaidpur
Party	Candidate	Votes	%	±%
SP	Gaurav Kumar Rawat	113,558	40.86	+5.58
BJP	Amrish Rawat	110,576	39.79	+6.39
INC	Tanuj Punia	28,689	10.32	−9.53
BSP	Usha Singh	18,400	6.62	−1.59
AIMIM	Akash Kumar Diwan	3,072	1.11	
NOTA	None of the above	1,761	0.63	−0.07
Majority		2,982	1.07	−0.81
Turnout		277,908	70.0	+12.68
SP hold		Swing		

=== 2019 bypoll ===
By-election, 2019: Zaidpur
Party	Candidate	Votes	%	±%
SP	Gaurav Kumar Rawat	78,172	35.28	+33.57
BJP	Amrish Rawat	74,007	33.40	−9.94
INC	Tanuj Punia	43,983	19.85	−12.1
BSP	Akhilesh Ambedkar	18,202	8.21	−10.56
PECP	Kailash Bahadur	3,390	1.53	
NOTA	None of the above	1,550	0.70	−0.47
Majority		4,165	1.88	−9.51
Turnout		2,21,578	58.32	−11.58
SP gain from BJP		Swing		

=== 2017 ===
2017 Uttar Pradesh Legislative Assembly Election: Zaidpur
Party	Candidate	Votes	%	±%
BJP	Upendra Singh Rawat	111,064	43.34	
INC	Tanuj Punia	81,883	31.95	
BSP	Kumari Meeta Gautam	48,095	18.77	
SP	Ram Gopal Rawat	4,383	1.71	
Independent	Kunj Bihari	2,505	0.98	
NOTA	None of the above	2,968	1.17	
Majority		29,181	11.39	
Turnout		256,287	69.9	

== See also ==
- Zaidpur
