= Ram Kinkar =

Indian politician (1922–2003)

Member of Parliament, Lok Sabha
- In office 1977-1984
- Preceded by: Rudra Pratap Singh
- Succeeded by: Kamla Prasad
- Constituency: Barabanki

Minister of State in the Ministry of Works and Housing and Supply and Rehabilitation
- In office August 1977 to June 1978
- Constituency: Barabanki

Minister for Works and Housing and Supply and Rehabilitation
- In office July 28, 1979, to January 13, 1980
- Constituency: Barabanki

Personal details
- Born: 2 February 1922 Sarai Rajai Village, Atarsan, P. O., Pratapgarh District
- Died: 12 September 2003 (aged 81) New Delhi, Delhi, India
- Party: Janata Party (Secular)
- Other political affiliations: Bharatiya Lok Dal; Jana Congress; Indian National Congress; Janata Party
- Spouse: Vimla Devi
- Children: 2 sons and 1 daughter
- Education: B.A., LL.B.
- Alma mater: Allahabad University; Lucknow University

Ram Kinkar (1922-2003) was an Indian politician. He was elected to the Lok Sabha, the lower house of the Parliament of India from the Barabanki, Uttar Pradesh constituency of Uttar Pradesh as a member of the Janata Party. He was Deputy Minister for Education, Social Welfare, Food & Civil Supplies, Revenue etc. from February 17, to July 15, 1970 and the Cabinet Minister for Sales Tax in Uttar Pradesh Government from July to October, 1970 and for Forest, November, 1970 to March 1971.

He was Minister of State in the Ministry of Works and Housing and Supply and Rehabilitation in Morarji Desai Cabinet from August 1977 to June 1978. He resigned from the Government on June 30, 1978, and rejoined the Ministry on January 26, 1979, with the same portfolio but as Cabinet Minister for Works and Housing and Supply and Rehabilitation in Charan Singh Cabinet from July 28, 1979, to January 13, 1980.

Kinkar died on September 12, 2003, in New Delhi at the age of 82.
