= Sabalgarh Assembly constituency =

Constituency of the Madhya Pradesh legislative assembly

Coordinates: 26.25°N 77.41°E

Sabalgarh
- Constituency No. 3 for the Madhya Pradesh Legislative Assembly

Constituency details
- Country: India
- Region: Central India
- State: Madhya Pradesh
- District: Morena
- Lok Sabha constituency: Morena
- Established: 1951
- Reservation: None

Member of Legislative Assembly
- 16th Madhya Pradesh Legislative Assembly
- Incumbent Sarla Vijendra Rawat
- Party: Bhartiya Janta Party
- Elected year: 2023
- Preceded by: Baijnath Kushwaha

Sabalgarh Assembly constituency is one of the 230 Vidhan Sabha (Legislative Assembly) constituencies of Madhya Pradesh state in central India. This constituency came into existence in 1951, as one of the 79 Vidhan Sabha constituencies of the erstwhile Madhya Bharat state. Sabalgarh (constituency number 3) is one of the six Vidhan Sabha constituencies located in Morena district. This constituency covers the entire Sabalgarh tehsil and part of Kailaras tehsil.

Sabalgarh is part of Morena Lok Sabha constituency.

== Members of Legislative Assembly ==
Year	Member	Party
Madhya Bharat
1952	Laxmi Chand	Indian National Congress
Madhya Pradesh
1957	Baboolal	Indian National Congress
1962	Buddha Ram	Independent
1967	Brijraj Singh Sikarwar	Independent
1972	Raghubar Dayal Rasoiya	Indian National Congress
1977	Sridharlal Hardenia	Janata Party
1980	Suresh Chandra	Indian National Congress (I)
1985	Bhagwati Prasad Bansal	Indian National Congress
1990	Meharban Singh Rawat	Bharatiya Janata Party
1993	Suresh Choudhari	Indian National Congress
1998	Bundilal Rawat	Bahujan Samaj Party
2003	Meharban Singh Rawat	Bharatiya Janata Party
2008	Suresh Choudhari	Indian National Congress
2013	Meharban Singh Rawat	Bharatiya Janata Party
2018	Baijnath Kushwaha	Indian National Congress
2023	Sarla Vijendra Rawat	Bharatiya Janata Party

== Election results ==
=== 2023 ===
2023 Madhya Pradesh Legislative Assembly election: Sabalgarh
Party	Candidate	Votes	%	±%
BJP	Sarla Vijendra Rawat	66,787	37.07	+7.66
INC	Baijnath Kushwah	56,982	31.63	−3.97
BSP	Soni Dhakad	51,153	28.39	−1.52
SP	Lal Singh Rathor	1,781	0.99	+0.44
NOTA	None of the above	589	0.33	−0.32
Majority		9,805	5.44	−0.25
Turnout		180,152	77.0	+1.28
BJP gain from INC		Swing		

=== 2018 ===
M. P. Legislative Assembly Election, 2018: Sabalgarh
Party	Candidate	Votes	%	±%
INC	Baijnath Kushwaha	54,606	35.6	
BSP	Lal Singh Kewat	45,869	29.91	
BJP	Sarla Vijendra Rawat	45,100	29.41	
AAP	Umesh Verma	1,532	1.0	
Independent	Chandra Prakash Sharma	1,433	0.93	
NOTA	None of the above	994	0.65	
Majority		8,737	5.69	
Turnout		153,370	75.72	

== See also ==
- Sabalgarh
