= Ram Nagar, Uttar Pradesh Assembly constituency =

Constituency of the Uttar Pradesh legislative assembly in India

Coordinates: 25.28°N 83.03°E

Ramnagar
- Constituency No. 267 for the Uttar Pradesh Legislative Assembly

Constituency details
- Country: India
- Region: North India
- State: Uttar Pradesh
- District: Barabanki
- Total electors: 3,38,326
- Reservation: None

Member of Legislative Assembly
- 18th Uttar Pradesh Legislative Assembly
- Incumbent Fareed Mahfooz Kidwai
- Party: Samajwadi Party
- Elected year: 2022
- Preceded by: Sharad Kumar Awasthi

Ramnagar is a constituency of the Uttar Pradesh Legislative Assembly covering the city of Ramnagar in the Barabanki district of Uttar Pradesh, India. It is one of five assembly constituencies in the Barabanki Lok Sabha constituency. Since 2008, this assembly constituency is numbered 267 amongst 403 constituencies.

== Members of the Legislative Assembly ==
Election	Name	Party
2007	Amresh Kumar	Bahujan Samaj Party
2012	Arvind Kumar Singh	Samajwadi Party
2017	Sharad Kumar Awasthi	Bharatiya Janata Party
2022	Fareed Mahfooz Kidwai	Samajwadi Party

== Election results ==
=== 2027 ===
2027 Uttar Pradesh Legislative Assembly election: Ram Nagar
Party	Candidate	Votes	%	±%
INDIA				
NDA				
BSP				
NOTA	None of the above			
Majority				
Turnout				
gain from		Swing		

=== 2022 ===
2022 Uttar Pradesh Legislative Assembly election: Ram Nagar
Party	Candidate	Votes	%	±%
SP	Fareed Mahfooz Kidwai	98,799	41.96	+12.28
BJP	Sharad Kumar Awasthi	98,538	41.85	+1.98
BSP	Ram Kishor Shukla	23,259	9.88	−14.28
AIMIM	Vikas Shrivastava	4,940	2.1	+1.56
INC	Gyanesh Shukla	4,430	1.88	
NOTA	None of the above	1,822	0.77	−0.18
Majority		261	0.11	−10.08
Turnout		235,461	69.6	+1.21
SP gain from BJP		Swing		

=== 2017 ===
Bharatiya Janta Party candidate Sharad Kumar Awasthi is the MLA who won in 2017 Uttar Pradesh Legislative Assembly election defeating Samajwadi Party candidate Arvind Kumar Singh by a margin of 22,727 votes.

2017 Uttar Pradesh Legislative Assembly Election: Ram Nagar
Party	Candidate	Votes	%	±%
BJP	Sharad Kumar Awasthi	88,937	39.87	
SP	Arvind Kumar Singh	66,210	29.68	
BSP	Hafeez Bharti	53,891	24.16	
PECP	Raj Luxmi Verma	3,137	1.41	
NOTA	None of the above	2,094	0.95	
Majority		22,727	10.19	
Turnout		223,077	68.39	

== See also ==
- Ram Nagar, Barabanki
- Chief Electoral Officer, Uttar Pradesh>Information and Statistics>AC's, PC's Booths>Assembly Constituencies>267-Ram Nagar
