= Kursi Assembly constituency =

Constituency of the Uttar Pradesh legislative assembly in India

Coordinates: 27.06°N 81.05°E

Kursi
- Constituency No. 266 for the Uttar Pradesh Legislative Assembly

Constituency details
- Country: India
- Region: North India
- State: Uttar Pradesh
- District: Barabanki
- Total electors: 3,95,071
- Reservation: None

Member of Legislative Assembly
- 18th Uttar Pradesh Legislative Assembly
- Incumbent Sakendra Pratap Verma
- Party: Bharatiya Janta Party
- Elected year: 2022

Kursi is a constituency of the Uttar Pradesh Legislative Assembly covering the city of Kursi in the Barabanki district of Uttar Pradesh, India. It is one of five assembly constituencies in the Barabanki Lok Sabha constituency. Since 2008, this assembly constituency is numbered 266 amongst 403 constituencies.

== Members of the Legislative Assembly ==
Election	Name	Party
2012	Fareed Mahfooj Kidwai	Samajwadi Party
2017	Sakendra Pratap Verma	Bharatiya Janata Party
2022	Sakendra Pratap Verma	Bharatiya Janata Party

== Election results ==
=== 2027 ===
2027 Uttar Pradesh Legislative Assembly election: Kursi
Party	Candidate	Votes	%	±%
INDIA				
NDA				
BSP				
NOTA	None of the above			
Majority				
Turnout				
gain from		Swing		

=== 2022 ===
2022 Uttar Pradesh Legislative Assembly election: Kursi
Party	Candidate	Votes	%	±%
BJP	Sakendra Pratap Verma	118,720	41.15	−0.11
SP	Rakesh Kumar Verma	118,503	41.07	+10.73
BSP	Meeta Gautam	35,561	12.33	−7.12
AIMIM	Kumail Asharaf Khan	8,541	2.96	
INC	Shrimati Urmila Patel	2,803	0.97	
NOTA	None of the above	1,723	0.6	+0.04
Majority		217	0.08	−10.84
Turnout		288,519	73.03	+2.9
BJP hold		Swing		

=== 2017 ===
Bharatiya Janta Party candidate Sakendra Pratap Verma won the 2017 Uttar Pradesh Legislative Elections defeating Samajwadi Party candidate Fareed Mahfooz Kidwai by a margin of 28,679 votes.

2017 Uttar Pradesh Legislative Assembly Election: Kursi
Party	Candidate	Votes	%	±%
BJP	Sakendra Pratap Verma	108,403	41.26	
SP	Fareed Mahfooz Kidwai	79,724	30.34	
BSP	V.P.Singh Verma	51,091	19.45	
PECP	Sarvar Ali	8,329	3.17	
Independent	Ch.Talib Najib Kokab	4,381	1.67	
RLD	Amar Singh	2,445	0.93	
NOTA	None of the above	1,460	0.56	
Majority		28,679	10.92	
Turnout		262,731	70.13	

== See also ==
- List of constituencies of the Uttar Pradesh Legislative Assembly
- Barabanki district
