= Sunder Lal Dixit =

Indian politician (died 2023)

Sunder Lal Dixit (1942/1943 – 14 January 2023) was an Indian politician and member of the Bharatiya Janata Party. Dixit was a member of the Uttar Pradesh Legislative Assembly from the Haidergarh constituency in Barabanki district.

Dixit died on 14 January 2023, at the age of 80.
