= Sharad Kumar Awasthi =

Indian politician

Member of the Uttar Pradesh Legislative Assembly
- In office 2017–2022
- Preceded by: Arvind Kumar Singh
- Succeeded by: Fareed Mahfooz Kidwai
- Constituency: Ram Nagar

Personal details
- Born: 1 February 1967 (age 59) Masauli, Barabanki, Uttar Pradesh, India
- Party: Bharatiya Janata Party
- Spouse: Shobhana Awasthi (m. 1999)
- Children: 3
- Education: MA, Jawahar Lal Nehru Post Graduate College, Barabanki (1994); LLB
- Profession: Advocate; agriculturalist

Sharad Kumar Awasthi (born 1 February 1967) is an Indian politician and a former MLA from Ram Nagar in the 17th Legislative Assembly of Uttar Pradesh.

== Personal life ==
Awasthi was born on 1 February 1967 to Ram Shankar Awasthi in Masauli village of Barabanki district, Uttar Pradesh. He obtained his Master of Arts degree from Jawahar Lal Nehru Post Graduate College, Barabanki in 1994. He married Shobhana Awasthi on 3 October 1999, with whom he has a son and two daughters. He is an advocate and an agriculturalist by profession.

== Political career ==
Awasthi was elected in the 2017 Uttar Pradesh Legislative Assembly election as a Bharatiya Janta Party candidate after he defeated then incumbent Samajwadi Party candidate Arvind Kumar Singh by a margin of 22,727 votes.

In the 2022 Uttar Pradesh Legislative Assembly election, Awasthi lost to Samajwadi Party's Fareed Mahfooz Kidwai by a mere margin of 261 votes.
