= P. L. Punia =

Indian politician

P. L. Punia IAS
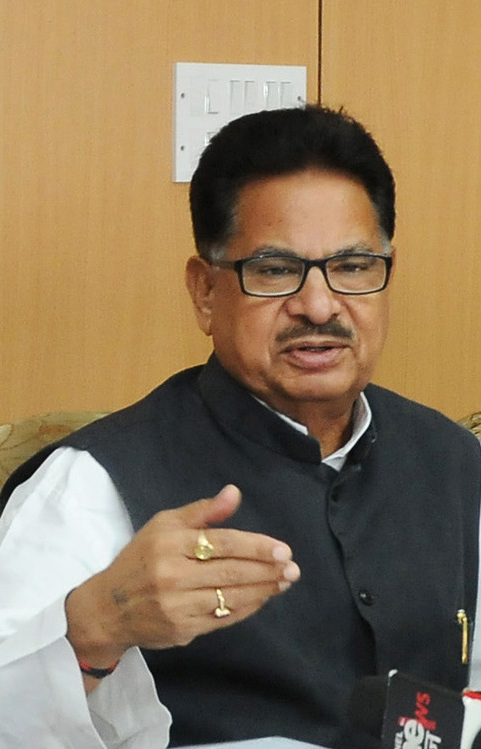
- P. L. Punia holding a Press Conference, in New Delhi on September 06, 2012

MP of Rajya Sabha for Uttar Pradesh
- In office 26 November 2014 – 25 November 2020
- Succeeded by: Geeta Shakya
- Constituency: Uttar Pradesh

Chairman of the National Commission for Scheduled Castes
- In office 30 October 2010 – 30 May 2017
- Preceded by: Buta Singh
- Succeeded by: Ram Shankar Katheria

MP of 15th Lok Sabha
- In office 25 May 2009 – 26 May 2014
- Preceded by: Kamla Prasad Rawat
- Succeeded by: Priyanka Singh Rawat
- Constituency: Barabanki (Uttar Pradesh)

Personal details
- Born: 23 January 1945 (age 81) Salhawas, Punjab, British India (now in Haryana, India)
- Party: Indian National Congress
- Spouse: Indira Punia
- Children: 3 including Tanuj Punia
- Education: Panjab University (M.A.); Lucknow University (Ph.D.)
- Website: https://plpunia.blogspot.com/

Panna Lal Punia, usually known as P. L. Punia, (born 23 January 1945) is an Indian politician and former Member of the Rajya Sabha from Uttar Pradesh from 2014 till 2020. He is a Dalit leader of the Indian National Congress.

In July 2012, Punia appeared on the popular TV show Satyamev Jayate, hosted by Bollywood star Aamir Khan, to raise awareness of discrimination against scheduled castes.

== Early life, career and family ==
He was born on 23 January 1945 to Bharat Singh and Dakhan Devi in the Jhajjar district of the Punjab region (now Haryana), British India. He took an M.A. from Panjab University, Chandigarh and a PhD from Lucknow University, Uttar Pradesh. In 1970 he joined the Indian Administrative Service (IAS), becoming District magistrate in Aligarh during 1982–85.

P. L. Punia is married to Indira Punia and they have 3 children. Their son Tanuj Punia is a graduate (B.Tech) from IIT Roorkee and has been involved in social work since 2007. He contested the 2017 Uttar Pradesh election as a Congress candidate in Zaidpur and came runner-up. He has become a spokesperson of the Indian National Congress since then. In 2024 he became a Member of Parliament from Barabanki Lok Sabha Constituency. He defeated Rajrani Rawat of the Bharatiya Janata Party by a margin of over 2 lakh votes.

== Political life ==
Punia began his career as a civil servant in the Indian Administrative Service (IAS), serving in the Uttar Pradesh cadre. During his tenure, he worked closely with several Chief Ministers, including Mayawati, and gained experience in governance and public administration. After taking voluntary retirement, Punia entered active politics and joined the Congress Party.

He was a member of the Lok Sabha from 2009 to 2014 and represented Barabanki (Lok Sabha constituency). in Uttar Pradesh and later served as a Member of the Rajya Sabha. He was also chairperson of the National Commission for Scheduled Castes between 2013 and 2016 and as such sat ex officio on the National Human Rights Commission (NHRC).
