= Sarla Vijendra Rawat =

Indian politician

Member of the Madhya Pradesh Legislative Assembly
- Incumbent
- Assumed office December 2023
- Preceded by: Baijnath Kushwaha
- Constituency: Sabalgarh

Personal details
- Born: 1 January 1983 (age 43)
- Party: Bhartiya Janta Party
- Occupation: Politician

Sarla Vijendra Rawat (born 1 January 1983) is an Indian politician from Madhya Pradesh. She is a member of the Madhya Pradesh Legislative Assembly representing the Bharatiya Janata Party from Sabalgarh Assembly constituency in Morena district. She won the 2023 Madhya Pradesh Legislative Assembly election.

Rawat is from Sabalgarh, Morena district, Madhya Pradesh. She married Vijender Singh. She studied at Kasturba Gandhi Sanskrit Girls Higher Secondary School, and passed Class 10.

== Career ==
Rawat won the 2023 Madhya Pradesh Legislative Assembly election from Sabalgarh Assembly constituency defeating Baji Nath Kushwah of Indian National Congress by a margin of 9,305 votes.
