= Kehar Singh Rawat =

Indian politician

Member of Haryana Legislative Assembly
- In office 2014-2019
- Constituency: Hathin

Personal details
- Born: 7 February 1973 (age 53) Nangal Jat, Palwal, Haryana
- Party: Bharatiya Janata Party
- Parent(s): Lt. Chetram; Mangaliya
- Occupation: Politician

Kehar Singh Rawat is an Indian politician. He was elected to the Haryana Legislative Assembly from Hathin in the 2014 as a member of the Indian National Lok Dal.

In 2019, he resigned as MLA and from Haryana Legislative Assembly and joined Bharatiya Janata Party.
