= Ram Sewak Yadav =

Indian politician (1926–1974)

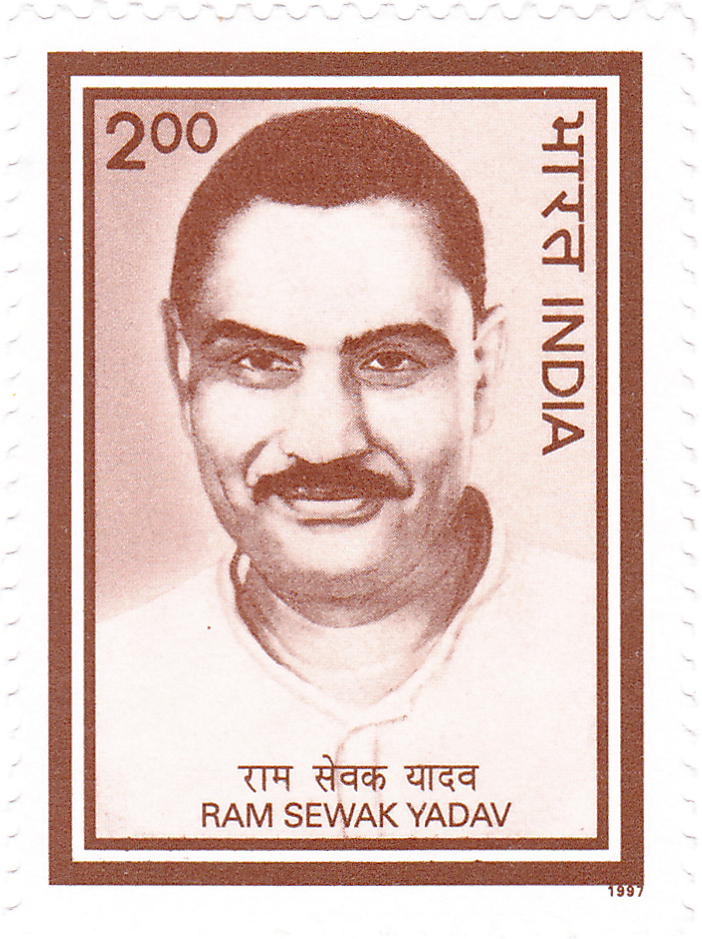
- Yadav on a 1997 stamp of India

Member of Parliament, Lok Sabha
- In office 1957–1971
- Preceded by: Mohanlal Saxena
- Succeeded by: Rudra Pratap Singh
- Constituency: Barabanki, Uttar Pradesh

Personal details
- Born: 2 July 1926 Tala, Thalvara ,Barabanki, United Provinces, British India (present-day Uttar Pradesh, India)
- Died: 22 November 1974 (aged 48) New Delhi, India
- Party: Samyukta Socialist Party
- Other political affiliations: Socialist Party (India)

Ram Sewak Yadav (2 July 1926 – 22 November 1974) was an Indian politician. He was elected to the Lok Sabha, the lower house of the Parliament of India from Barabanki, Uttar Pradesh.

Yadav died in New Delhi on 22 November 1974, at the age of 48.
