= Fareed Mahfooz Kidwai =

Indian politician

Member of the Uttar Pradesh Legislative Assembly
- Incumbent
- Assumed office 10 March 2022
- Preceded by: Sharad Kumar Awasthi
- Constituency: Ram Nagar
- In office 2012–2017
- Succeeded by: Sakendra Pratap Verma
- Constituency: Kursi constituency
- In office 2007–2012
- Constituency: Masauli

Personal details
- Born: 18 July 1944 (age 82) Masauli, United Provinces, British India
- Party: Samajwadi Party (2011 - present)
- Other political affiliations: Bahujan Samaj Party (till 2011)
- Spouse: Salma Kidwai (m. 1977)
- Children: 2
- Education: Aligarh Muslim University (M.Sc Biology, 1966)
- Profession: Agriculturalist

Fareed Mahfooz Kidwai (born 18 July 1944) is an Indian politician and a member of 18th Legislative Assembly of Uttar Pradesh representing Ram Nagar since March 2022. He is a member of the Samajwadi Party. Kidwai had previously represented Masauli as a member of Bahujan Samaj Party in the 15th, and Kursi in the 16th Uttar Pradesh Assembly as a Samajwadi Party candidate.

== Personal life ==
Kidwai was born to Mahfooz Ahmad in Masauli village of Barabanki district on 18 July 1944. He completed his Master of Science in biology from Aligarh Muslim University in 1966. He married Salma Kidwai on 15 January 1977, with whom he has two sons. Kidwai hails from Zaidpur town of Uttar Pradesh and is an agriculturalist by profession.

== Political career ==
As a member of Bahujan Samaj Party, Kidwai was elected as the Member of Legislative Assembly from Masauli constituency in the 2007 Uttar Pradesh Legislative Assembly election, after he defeated IJP's Rakesh Kumar Verma by 5,364 votes. However, in May 2011, before completion of the five-year term, Kidwai left Bahujan Samaj Party to rejoin Samajwadi Party.

Representing Kursi constituency in the 2012 election, Kidwai was able to defeat Bahujan Samaj Party's Kumari Meeta Gautam by a margin of 23,937 votes. But in the 2017 election, an incumbent Kidwai lost to Bharatiya Janta Party candidate Sakendra Pratap Verma by margin of 28,679 votes.

In the 2022 Uttar Pradesh Legislative Assembly election, Kidwai, representing Samajwadi Party as a candidate from Ram Nagar constituency, went on to defeat Bharatiya Janata Party's incumbent MLA Sharad Kumar Awasthi by a small margin of 261 votes.
