= Siddhaur =

- Town
- Location in Uttar Pradesh, India
- Coordinates: 26°46′10″N 81°25′5″E
- Country: India
- State: Uttar Pradesh
- District: Barabanki

Population (2011)
  - Total: 12,438

Languages
  - Official: Hindi
- Time zone: UTC+5:30 (IST)
- Vehicle registration: UP-41

Siddhaur is a town and a nagar panchayat in Barabanki district in the Indian state of Uttar Pradesh.

It was initially known as Siddhpura, and as time passed by, it became Siddhaur. It is around 28 km from district headquarters Barabanki. It is adorned by the Siddheshwar Mahadev temple and Mazar of who was the disciple of Peer Makhdoom Syed Ashraf Jahangeer Simnani (r.a). In the months of December and January each year a big fair is held on the occasion of Shivratri at the Siddheshwar Mahadev temple.

== Demographics ==
As of 2001 India census, Siddhaur had a population of 10,745. Males constitute 53% of the population and females 47%. Siddhaur has an average literacy rate of 38%, lower than the national average of 59.5%: male literacy is 46%, and female literacy is 29%. In Siddhaur, 18% of the population is under 6 years of age.

In past Kali Sahay Saheb was lord of Siddhaur empire.
