= Tanuj Punia =

Indian politician

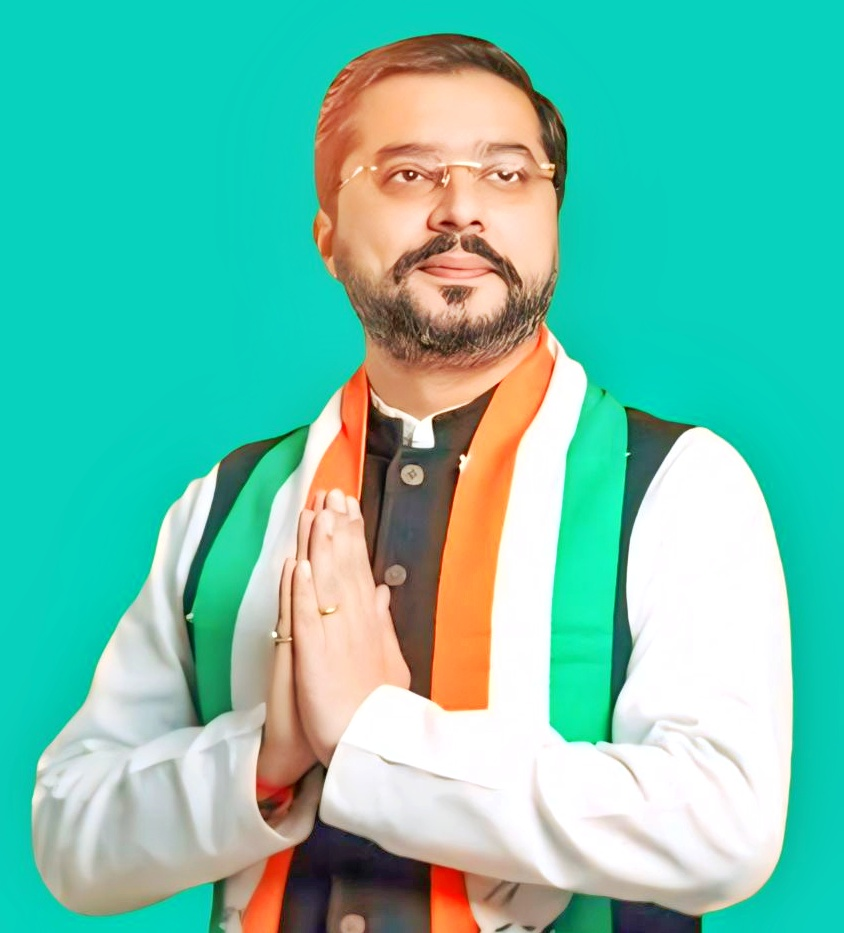
- Punia in 2024

Member of Parliament, Lok Sabha
- Incumbent
- Assumed office 4 June 2024
- Preceded by: Upendra Singh Rawat
- Constituency: Barabanki

Personal details
- Born: 16 January 1985 (age 41) Aligarh, Uttar Pradesh, India
- Party: Indian National Congress
- Spouse: Shraddha Singh
- Parent: P. L. Punia (father)
- Education: IIT Roorkee (BTech)
- Occupation: Politician

Tanuj Punia (born 16 January 1985) is an Indian politician and serving as the Member of Parliament from Barabanki. He is a member of Indian National Congress. He completed his BTech in Chemical Engineering from IIT Roorkee.

== Political career ==
Punia was elected in 2024 as a Member of Parliament from Barabanki Lok Sabha Constituency. He defeated Rajrani Rawat of the Bharatiya Janata Party by a margin of over 2 lakh votes.
