= Veena Rawat =

Indian-born Canadian electrical engineer

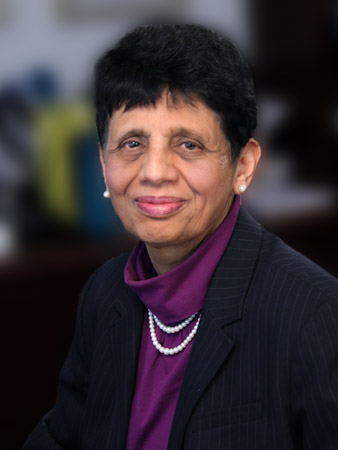
- Education: Electrical Engineering, Queen's University
- Alma mater: Birla Institute of Technology and Science
- Known for: First woman to graduate from Queen's University with a PhD in Electrical Engineering
- Awards: Queen Elizabeth II Golden Jubilee Medal 2003, IEEE Communications Society Award 2012, Public Service Award of Excellence, 2011, Officer of the Order of Canada
- Scientific career
- Fields: Telecommunications

Veena Rawat OC is an electrical engineer who specializes in telecommunications. Rawat was the first woman to graduate with a PhD in electrical engineering from Queen's University in Kingston, Ontario, Canada. She held executive positions managing programs related to radio frequency spectrum engineering for all wireless and space communication services in the Canadian Government, was the President of the Communications Research Centre (CRC), and was the Vice President and Ambassador to the International Telecommunication Union, for Blackberry, Advanced Technology Division, Canada. In 2014 she was awarded the Officer of the Order of Canada (OC) for her lifetime achievements and contributions at the national and international levels to wireless communications.

== Personal ==
Rawat emigrated to Canada from India in 1968. She speaks English, French, Hindi and Spanish.

== Education ==
In 1967 she graduated from Birla Institute of Technology and Science, Pilani, India, with M. Tech in Electronics.

In 1973, Rawat was the first woman to graduate with a PhD in electrical engineering from Queen's University in Kingston, Ontario, Canada.

== Career ==
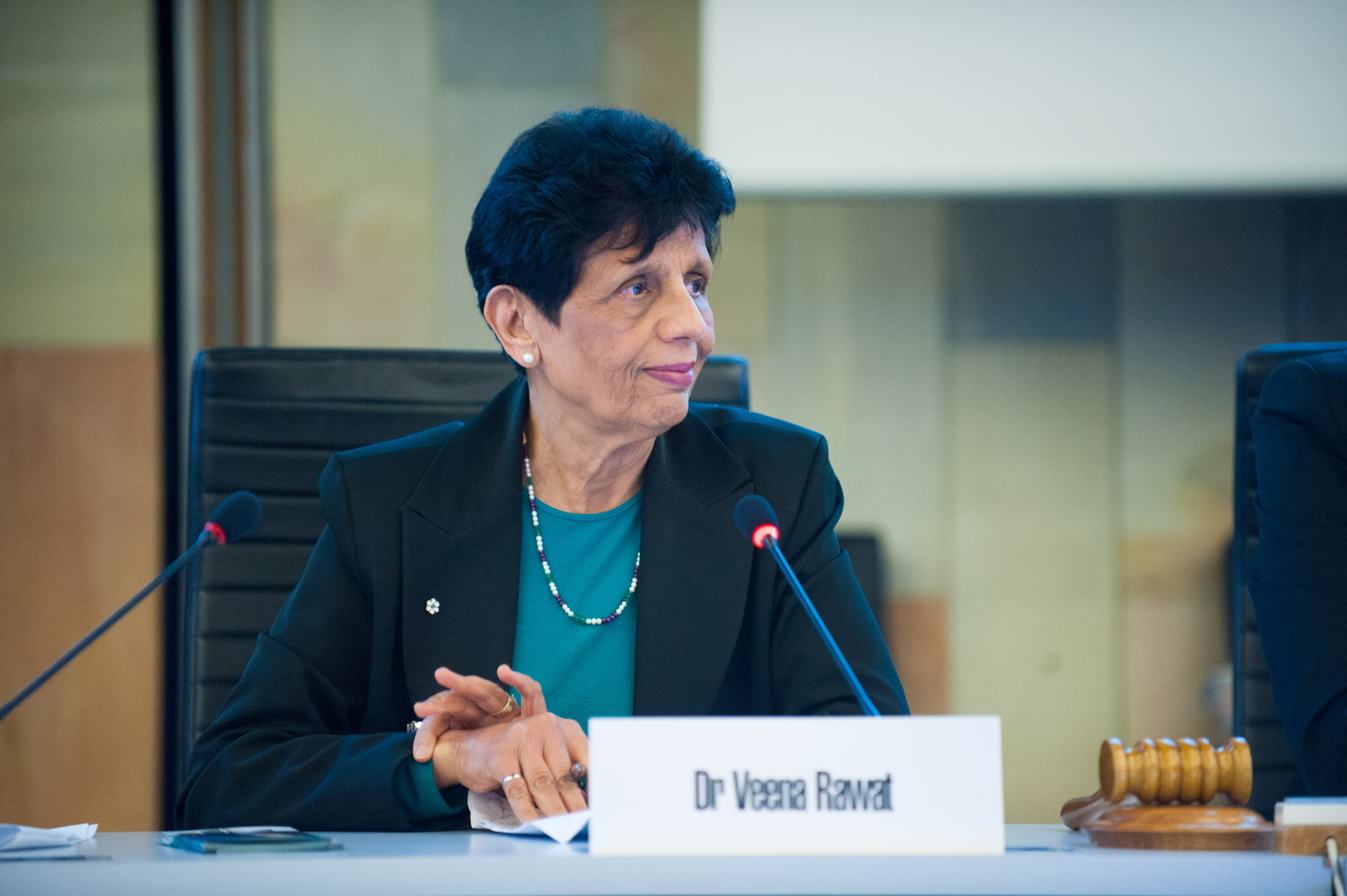
Network of Women for WRC-19 during the Working Party 4A meeting

Dr. Rawat came to CRC after spending 28 years within the Canadian Government where she held executive positions managing programs related to radio frequency spectrum engineering for all wireless and space communication services. This included: leading negotiations at the International Telecommunication Union of United Nations (ITU), Organization of American States (OAS) and US Government (FCC, NTIA); chairing major national and international committees; and consultations with senior executives of the telecom and space industry at global level to develop policies and regulations. Rawat was the first woman to chair a World Radiocommunication Conference (WRC-03), for which she was awarded an ITU gold medal. Also, Rawat was chair of the ITU-R SG-4 for Satellite Services and chair of numerous working groups and technical committees at ITU-R and WRCs.

During 2004-2011, Rawat was President of the Communications Research Centre, Canada's centre of excellence for telecommunications R&D, with 400 staff and an annual budget of over $50 million. For over 40 years, CRC has made significant contributions to the information and communications technology sector in Canada and abroad. The CRC’s research encompasses the four main platforms for information delivery: terrestrial wireless, satellite, fibre optics and broadcasting. Rawat was responsible for Canada’s participation in bilateral and multilateral information and communications technologies (ICT) research partnerships with many countries around the world.

In 2010 Rawat was a candidate for the position of Director, Radiocommunication Bureau, International Telecommunication Union (ITU).

From 2011 to 2013, Rawat was Vice President and Ambassador to the International Telecommunication Union, for Blackberry, Advanced Technology Division, Canada. She was responsible for representing Blackberry at the ITU and various national and international fora at executive level in matters related to RF Spectrum planning, allocation, harmonization and coordination for wireless technologies and services.

Since Jan 2013, Rawat has served as a consultant in the field of wireless communications, she provided advisory services to various telecommunications companies and international organizations.

An internationally recognized expert in spectrum management and ICT technologies and trends, Rawat has been a keynote and invited speaker at over 100 domestic and international conferences and events since 1995.

== Honours and awards ==
- Honorary Doctor of Science, Queen's University, Kingston, Ontario, Canada, 2025
- Honorary Doctor of Science, and Commencement speaker at the Engineering Faculty graduation ceremony, University of Ottawa, Ottawa, Ontario, Canada, 2019.
- Officer of the Order of Canada, 2014.
- IEEE Communications Society Award for Public Service in the Field of Telecommunications, 2012
- 2011 Public Service Award of Excellence, Government of Canada.
- Canada’s Leading Woman High Tech Entrepreneur/Sara Kirke Award for Woman Entrepreneurship, Canadian Advanced Technology Alliance, 2008
- Canada’s Most Powerful Women, Top 100, Canada’s Executive Women’s Network, 2005
- Leadership in Government Award, Wireless Communications Association International(USA), 2005
- Professional Woman of the Year Award, Indo-Canada Chamber of Commerce, 2005
- Canadian Woman of the Year in Communications, Canadian Women in Communications, 2004
- Radio Advisory Board of Canada Award of Excellence, Radio Advisory Board of Canada, 2004
- Honorary Fellowship, Broadcast Engineering Society, India, 2004.
- International Telecommunication Union (ITU) Gold Medal, World Radiocommunication Conference 2003 (WRC-03) Chairmanship, 2003
- Queen Elizabeth II Golden Jubilee Medal, 2003
- Excellence in Leadership Award, Industry Canada, 2003
