= Meharban Singh Rawat =

Indian politician

Meharban Singh Rawat is an Indian politician and member of the Bharatiya Janata Party. Rawat was a member of the Madhya Pradesh Legislative Assembly from the Sabalgarh constituency in Morena district from 2013 to 2018.
