= Sakendra Pratap Verma =

Member of the Uttar Pradesh Legislative Assembly

Member of Uttar Pradesh Legislative Assembly
- Incumbent
- Assumed office March 2017
- Preceded by: Fareed Mahfooz Kidwai
- Constituency: Kursi

Personal details
- Born: 2 January 1961 (age 65) Sitapur, Uttar Pradesh
- Party: Bharatiya Janata Party
- Spouse: Sushma Verma
- Children: 1
- Parent: Ram Kumar Verma (father)
- Education: Master of Arts
- Alma mater: Chhatrapati Shahu Ji Maharaj University
- Occupation: Teacher
- Profession: Politician

Sakendra Pratap Verma is an Indian politician, teacher, and a member of the 18th Uttar Pradesh Assembly from the Kursi Assembly constituency of Barabanki district. He is a member of the Bharatiya Janata Party.

== Early life ==
Sakendra Pratap Verma was born on 2 January 1961 in Sitapur, Uttar Pradesh, to a family of Ram Kumar Verma. He married Sushma Verma, and they had one daughter.

== Education ==
Sakendra Pratap Verma completed his post-education with a Master of Arts in economics and a Bachelor of Education at Chhatrapati Shahu Ji Maharaj University, Kanpur.

== Posts held ==
| # | From | To | Position | Comments |
|---|---|---|---|---|
| 01 | March 2017 | March 2022 | Member, 17th Uttar Pradesh Assembly | |
| 02 | March 2022 | Incumbent | Member, 18th Uttar Pradesh Assembly | |

== See also ==
- Kursi Assembly constituency
- 18th Uttar Pradesh Assembly
- Uttar Pradesh Legislative Assembly
