= Kamla Prasad =

Indian politician

Kamla Prasad Rawat

MP
- Constituency: Barabanki

Personal details
- Born: 6 July 1954 (age 71) Barabanki, Uttar Pradesh, India
- Died: 30 April 2021 Muzaffarpur
- Party: Bahujan Samaj Party
- Spouse: Dharmee Devi
- As of 17 September, 2006

Kamla Prasad Rawat (born 6 July 1954) is an Indian politician and former MP for Barabanki (Lok Sabha constituency) in Uttar Pradesh.
