= Priyanka Singh Rawat =

Indian politician

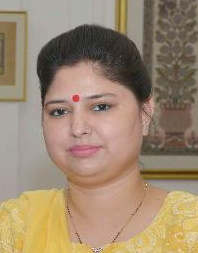

Member of Parliament, Rajya Sabha
- Incumbent
- Assumed office 26 November 2026
- Preceded by: Brij Lal (politician)

Member of the India Parliament for Barabanki
- In office 16 May 2014 – 23 May 2019
- Preceded by: P. L. Punia
- Succeeded by: Upendra Singh Rawat
- Constituency: Barabanki

Personal details
- Born: 7 August 1985 (age 41) Bareilly, Uttar Pradesh, India
- Party: Bharatiya Janata Party
- Spouse: Raghunath Rawat

Priyanka Singh Rawat is an Indian politician who represents the Bharatiya Janata Party.

== Early life ==
Rawat was born on 7 August 1985 at Bareilly, Uttar Pradesh, to Uttam Ram Singh and Prabha Singh. Uttam Ram is a retired Provincial Civil Service officer. She received a M.A. degree in political science from Mahatma Jyotiba Phule Rohilkhand University in 2007. She also received a postgraduate diploma in mass communication and electronic journalism from the same university in the following year.She got initial traning in electronic journalism in Nagpur, where her husbands was initially posted,under the supervision of Shri Manish mishra from AaJTak. However, after some time she decided to join politics so her journey in journalism didn’t go long. Again she started her journey as anchor in News Nasha, in 2019 however, it had also didn’t go long due to her appointment as General Secretary, BJP UP.

== Political career ==
in October 2026, Rawat was officially elected unopposed to the Rajya Sabha from Uttar pradesh as a candidate of the Bharatiya Janata Party.

Smt Rawat participated in youth politics during her university days. She was elected library incharge at that time.She was also closely associated with ABVP, a student wing of RSS/BJP

In June 2013, Rawat joined the Bharatiya Janata Party. On 16 March 2014, the party announced that Rawat would contest the upcoming general election from Barabanki constituency. She was elected to the Lok Sabha in May after defeating her nearest rival PL Punia of the Indian National Congress party by a margin of approximately 211,000 votes. On 1 September 2014, she became a member of the Standing Committee on Food, Consumer Affairs and Public Distribution. She was appointed member of the Consultative Committee of the Ministry of Women and Child Development.

During 2014–2019, Priyanka Rawat started development work in the fields of agriculture, education, health and roads in Barabanki. Priyanka had caught everyone's attention by raising the issue of an incomplete dam on Suratganj of Ramnagar on the banks of the Ghaghra River (now Saryu) in flood-affected Barabanki. After this the dam started being built. As MP, it was Priyanka's important achievement to repair roads and build new roads in Barabanki. Priyanka's construction of National Highway-56, the road from Ramnagar to Rupidhia border in Barabanki on National Highway-28, was a significant achievement. Apart from this, Priyanka included a dozen villages of Barabanki in Deva Road, Lucknow Outer Ring Road. Due to Priyanka's efforts, a trauma center was established in Barabanki and a college in Daryabad area of the district.

Smt Rawat has been appointed as General Secretary, BJP Uttar Pradesh in the year 2020 and repeated for the same post in the year 2023. She has been given independent prabhar ( incharge) of Kanpur Bundelkhand region by BJP organisation of UP. After successfully completion of 6 years as General Secretary she has been appointed as Vice President, BJP UP in 2026.

Smt. Rawat is not only a politician but also a renowned social worker. She has been associated with several NGOs and has been actively working for the welfare and upliftment of women, children, and underprivileged sections of society, particularly those belonging to the Scheduled Castes (SCs) and Scheduled Tribes (STs).

== Personal life ==
On 5 December 2007, Smt Rawat married to Shri Raghunath, who is an Indian Revenue Service officer of the 2007 batch. They have two daughters Tavanya Singh (17 yrs ) Chetali Singh (14yrs) and one son Krishu Singh (11yrs).
