= Haidergarh Assembly constituency =

Constituency of the Uttar Pradesh legislative assembly in India

Coordinates: 26.60°N 81.36°E

Haidergarh
- Constituency No. 272 for the Uttar Pradesh Legislative Assembly

Constituency details
- Country: India
- Region: North India
- State: Uttar Pradesh
- District: Barabanki
- Total electors: 3,49,784
- Reservation: SC

Member of Legislative Assembly
- 18th Uttar Pradesh Legislative Assembly
- Incumbent Dinesh Rawat
- Party: Bharatiya Janta Party
- Elected year: 2022

Haidergarh is a constituency of the Uttar Pradesh Legislative Assembly covering the city of Haidergarh in the Barabanki district of Uttar Pradesh, India. Bharatiya Janata Party candidate Dinesh Rawat won in the last Assembly election of 2022 Uttar Pradesh Legislative Assembly election.

Haidergarh is one of five assembly constituencies in the Barabanki Lok Sabha constituency. Since 2008, this assembly constituency is numbered 272 amongst 403 constituencies.

== Members of the Legislative Assembly ==
Year	Member	Political Party
1952	Bajrang Behari Lal	Independent
1957	Jang Bahadur	Independent
1962	Ram Kishore	Independent
1967	J. Bahadur	Samyukta Socialist Party
1969	Hamida Habibullah	Indian National Congress
1974	Jang Bahadur	Bharatiya Kranti Dal
1977	Sunder Lal	Independent
1980	Shyam Lal Bajpai	Indian National Congress
1985	Surendra Nath	Indian National Congress
1989	Sunder Lal	Indian National Congress
1991	Surendra Nath	Indian National Congress
1993	Sunder Lal	Indian National Congress
1996	Surendra Nath	Indian National Congress
2001^	Rajnath Singh	
2002	Rajnath Singh	
2003^	Arvind Singh Gope	Samajwadi Party
2007	Arvind Singh Gope	Samajwadi Party
2012	Ram Magan	Samajwadi Party
2017	Baijnath Rawat	Bharatiya Janata Party
2022	Dinesh Rawat	Bharatiya Janata Party

^By Poll

== Election results ==
=== 2027 ===
2027 Uttar Pradesh Legislative Assembly election: Haidergarh
Party	Candidate	Votes	%	±%
INDIA				
NDA				
BSP				
NOTA	None of the above			
Majority				
Turnout				
gain from		Swing		

=== 2022 ===
2022 Uttar Pradesh Legislative Assembly election: Haidergarh
Party	Candidate	Votes	%	±%
BJP	Dinesh Rawat	117,113	50.90	+5.38
SP	Ram Magan Rawat	91,422	39.73	+9.86
BSP	Shri Chandra	12,239	5.32	−17.37
INC	Nirmala Chaudhary	3,993	1.74	
NOTA	None of the above	2,483	1.08	−0.87
Majority		25,691	11.17	−4.48
Turnout		230,094	65.78	+1.17
BJP hold		Swing		

=== 2017 ===
Bharatiya Janta Party candidate Baijnath Rawat won in Assembly election of 2017 Uttar Pradesh Legislative Elections defeating Samajwadi Party candidate Ram Magan by a margin of 33,520 votes.

2017 Uttar Pradesh Legislative Assembly Election: Haidergar
Party	Candidate	Votes	%	±%
BJP	Baijnath Rawat	97,497	45.52	
SP	Ram Magan	63,977	29.87	
BSP	Kamala Prasad Rawat	48,600	22.69	
NOTA	None of the above	4,096	1.95	
Majority		33,520	15.65	
Turnout		214,170	64.61	

== See also ==
- List of constituencies of Uttar Pradesh Vidhan Sabha
- Haidergarh
