= Dinesh Rawat =

Member of the Uttar Pradesh Legislative Assembly

Member of Uttar Pradesh Legislative Assembly
- Incumbent
- Assumed office March 2022
- Preceded by: Baijnath Rawat
- Constituency: Haidergarh

Personal details
- Born: 5 May 1990 (age 36) Barabanki, Uttar Pradesh, India
- Party: Bharatiya Janata Party
- Spouse: Aarti Devi
- Children: 4
- Parent: Raja Ram Rawat (father)
- Education: Intermediate
- Alma mater: Sadguru Inter College
- Occupation: Farmer
- Profession: Politician

Dinesh Rawat (born 5 May 1990) is an Indian politician, farmer, and a member of the 18th Uttar Pradesh Assembly from the Haidergarh Assembly constituency of Barabanki district. He is a member of the Bharatiya Janata Party.

== Early life ==
Dinesh Rawat was born on 5 May 1990 in Barabanki, Uttar Pradesh, to a Hindu Pasi family of Raja Ram Rawat. He married Aarti Devi, and they had four children.

== Education ==
Dinesh Rawat completed intermediate at Sadguru Inter College, Barabanki, a college affiliated with the Uttar Pradesh State Board of High School and Intermediate Education.

== Posts held ==
#	From	To	Position	Comments
01	March 2022	Incumbent	Member, 18th Uttar Pradesh Assembly	

== See also ==
- 18th Uttar Pradesh Assembly
- Haidergarh Assembly constituency
- Uttar Pradesh Legislative Assembly
