= Ram Sagar Rawat =

Indian politician

Ram Sagar Rawat (born 13 July 1951) is an Indian politician from Barabanki, Uttar Pradesh.

He was elected to 6th, 9th, 10th,11th and 13th Lok Sabha from Barabanki (Lok Sabha constituency)
