= Upendra Singh Rawat =

Indian politician

Member of Parliament, Lok Sabha
- In office 23 May 2019 – 04 June 2024
- Preceded by: Priyanka Singh Rawat
- Succeeded by: Tanuj Punia
- Constituency: Barabanki

Personal details
- Born: 17 January 1969 (age 57) Barabanki, Uttar Pradesh, India
- Party: Bharatiya Janata Party
- Spouse: Urmila Devi
- Parents: Raj Kunwar (father); Sarojani Devi (mother)
- Education: M.A. Sociology, LL.B. Educated at J.N.P.J. College, Barabanki, Dr. Ram Manohar Lohia Avadh University, Faizabad and LLB DAV Mahavidyalaya Lucknow University
- Profession: Politician

Upendra Singh Rawat is an Indian politician who previously served as the member of the Member of Parliament in the Lok Sabha. He is a member of the Bharatiya Janata Party. In the 2019 general elections he was a candidate in the Barabanki constituency of Uttar Pradesh. He won the election with 535594 votes against the Samajwadi Party candidate Ram Sagar Rawat.

== Positions held ==
2017 - 2019-2024	Member, Uttar Pradesh Legislative Assembly

May, 2019 -4 June 2024	Elected to 17th Lok Sabha

24 July 2019 onwards -4 June 2024	Member, Committee on Welfare of Scheduled Castes and Scheduled Tribes

13 Sept. 2019 onwards - 4 June 2024	Member, Standing Committee on Personnel, Public Grievances, Law and Justice

== Attendance details of Upendra Singh Rawat (93% Attendance) ==
Session	Attendance
Budget Session 2020	96%
Winter Session 2019	75%
Budget Session 2019	100%

== Debates (Participated in 5 Debates) ==
Date	Debate title/Bill name	Debate Type
19.03.2020	Request to government to given opportunity to the young villagers under the Khelo India Scheme to developing their swimming skill	Special Mention
31.07.2019	Demand for more stoppages at Haidargarh Railway Station	Special mention
23.07.2019	Need to provide stoppage of various trains at Haidergarh Railway Station in Uttar Pradesh	LS - Matters under (Rule-377)
08.07.2019	Need to construct over bridge or underpass near Barabanki Railways station in Uttar Pradesh	LS - Matters under (Rule-377)
25.06.2019	Regarding need to take flood control measures in Barabanki parliamentary constituency, Uttar Pradesh	LS - Matters under (Rule-377)

== Questions details of Upendra Singh Rawat (68 questions asked) ==
Date	Title	Type	Ministry or Category
23.03.2020	Tax Disputes of PSUs	Unstarred	Finance
20.03.2020	Seats in Medical Colleges/Hospitals	Unstarred	Health And Family Welfare
19.03.2020	Subletting of Government Quarters	Unstarred	Housing And Urban Affairs
18.03.2020	Security at Stations	Unstarred	Railways
17.03.2020	Harassment of Dalits	Unstarred	Consumer Affairs, Food And Public Distribution
16.03.2020	Agricultural Credit	Starred	Finance
12.03.2020	National Highway Projects	Unstarred	Road Transport and Highways
11.03.2020	Services of BSNL and MTNL	Unstarred	Communications
06.03.2020	Powerloom Textile Mills	Unstarred	Textiles
05.03.2020	Delay in Works of MP Residences	Unstarred	Housing and Urban Affairs
05.03.2020	Barat Ghar in Government Colonies	Unstarred	Housing and Urban Affairs
04.03.2020	Welfare Schemes for Advocates	Unstarred	Law and Justice
04.03.2020	Pending Cases under the Consumer Act against Railways	Unstarred	Railways
03.03.2020	Functioning of RCI	Unstarred	Social Justice and Empowerment
02.03.2020	Inter-Cultural Initiatives	Starred	Culture
11.02.2020	Operational Cold Storages	Unstarred	Agriculture and Farmers Welfare
11.02.2020	Fire in Buildings and Factories	Unstarred	Home Affairs
10.02.2020	Unutilised Education Fund	Unstarred	Human Resource Development
07.02.2020	National Nutrition Survey	Unstarred	Health and Family Welfare
07.02.2020	Compensatory Afforestation Fund Act	Unstarred	Environment, Forest and Climate Change
06.02.2020	Guidelines for Retention of Government Accommodation	Unstarred	Housing and Urban Affairs
05.02.2020	Accumulation of Earned Leave	Unstarred	Prime Minister
04.02.2020	Modernization of Poultry	Unstarred	Fisheries, Animal Husbandry and Dairying
03.02.2020	Misappropriation of Funds	Unstarred	Culture
13.12.2019	Institutes Empanelled under AYUSH	Unstarred	AYUSH
09.12.2019	Transfer of Spouses in Kendriya Vidyalaya	Unstarred	Human Resource Development
06.12.2019	Death of Birds around Sambhar Lake	Unstarred	Environment, Forest and Climate Change
06.12.2019	ICDS-III	Unstarred	Women and Child Development
05.12.2019	Plantation of Trees along National Highways	Unstarred	Road Transport and Highways
04.12.2019	Refund for Tatkal Tickets	Unstarred	Railways
02.12.2019	Mis-utilisation of Funds Allocated to Cultural Organisations	Unstarred	Culture
29.11.2019	Treatment in CGHS Empanelled Hospitals	Unstarred	Health and Family Welfare
27.11.2019	Facilities by Empanelled Hospitals under ECHS	Unstarred	Defence
27.11.2019	Retirement Age	Unstarred	Prime Minister
25.11.2019	Schemes to Promote Tourism in Ladakh	Unstarred	Human Resource Development
22.11.2019	AYUSH CGHS Wellness Centres	Unstarred	AYUSH
21.11.2019	Renovation of Quarters by CPWD	Unstarred	Earth Sciences
21.11.2019	Depletion in Ground Water Level	Unstarred	Jal Shakti
20.11.2019	Confirmation of Tickets on MP Quota	Unstarred	Railways
19.11.2019	Funds for Drought Affected Regions	Unstarred	Agriculture and Farmers Welfare
19.11.2019	Challaning of Vehicles	Unstarred	Home Affairs
18.11.2019	IIM	Unstarred	Human Resource Development
18.11.2019	Education for Children of Economically Weaker Section	Unstarred	Human Resource Development
24.07.2019	Filling up of Reserved Vacancies in Different Departments	Unstarred	Prime Minister
24.07.2019	Communication System in Uttar Pradesh	Unstarred	Communications
23.07.2019	Water Scarcity for Agriculture	Unstarred	Agriculture And Farmers Welfare
22.07.2019	Employees of CBI	Unstarred	Labour And Employment
19.07.2019	Exorbitant Fee in Private Medical Colleges	Unstarred	Health And Family Welfare
19.07.2019	IMR and CMR	Unstarred	Information And Broadcasting
18.07.2019	Pay Related Difficulties of Employees of Air India	Unstarred	Civil Aviation
15.07.2019	Payments through Debit Cards	Unstarred	Finance
12.07.2019	Empowerment of Women in Rural Areas	Unstarred	Women and Child Development
12.07.2019	Menstrual Health	Unstarred	Health and Family Welfare
12.07.2019	Availability of Health Supplements in CGHS Wellness Centres	Unstarred	Health and Family Welfare
11.07.2019	Sub-letting of Central Government Quarters	Unstarred	Housing and Urban Affairs
11.07.2019	Boxing Trials	Unstarred	Youth Affairs and Sports
10.07.2019	LTC to Foreign Countries	Unstarred	Prime Minister
09.07.2019	Performance of Public Sector Enterprises	Starred	Heavy Industries and Public Enterprises
09.07.2019	Lactose Free Dairy Products	Unstarred	Fisheries, Animal Husbandry and Dairying
03.07.2019	Dog Squads	Unstarred	Defence
03.07.2019	Electrification of Railway Lines	Starred	Railways
03.07.2019	Rail Accidents due to Encroachment	Unstarred	Railways
02.07.2019	Issuance of Challans by Delhi Police	Unstarred	Home Affairs
01.07.2019	Development of Eco-Parks	Unstarred	Tourism
01.07.2019	Mental Ailments in Students	Unstarred	Human Resource Development
01.07.2019	Industrial Training Institute	Unstarred	Skill Development and Entrepreneurship
27.06.2019	Retention of Government Accommodation	Unstarred	Housing and Urban Affairs
26.06.2019	Quota for Students Appearing in Exams	Unstarred	Railways

== Controversy ==
In March 2024, after the Bharatiya Janata Party announced their roster of candidates, footage of Rawat engaging in objectionable actions went viral on social media. Following this, Rawat initially denied the allegations and stated that the video was doctored. An FIR was filed against unknown individuals by his personal secretary at the Kotwali police station. On March 4, 2024, Rawat cancelled his candidacy in the 2024 general elections vowing to not contest any other elections until proven innocent.
