= K. D. Singh Babu Stadium =

K. D. Singh Babu Stadium may refer to following stadiums, named after Indian field hockey player K. D. Singh Babu:

- K. D. Singh Babu Stadium, Barabanki, Uttar Pradesh, India
- K. D. Singh Babu Stadium, Lucknow, Uttar Pradesh, India

== See also ==
- KD Singh (disambiguation)
