= Parijat (disambiguation) =

Parijat or Nyctanthes arbor-tristis is the night-flowering jasmine.

Parijat may also refer to:

- Adansonia digitata, tree
- Parijat (writer) (1937–1993), Nepalese writer
- Parijaat tree, Kintoor, a sacred baobab tree in Kintoor, Uttar Pradesh, India
- "Parijata Paharanamu", a Telugu poem by Indian poet Nandi Thimmana
- Parijatha Vaneswarar Temple, a temple in Tamil Nadu, India

== See also ==
- Parijatham (disambiguation)
- Parijatha, 2012 Indian film
