= Bhitauli =

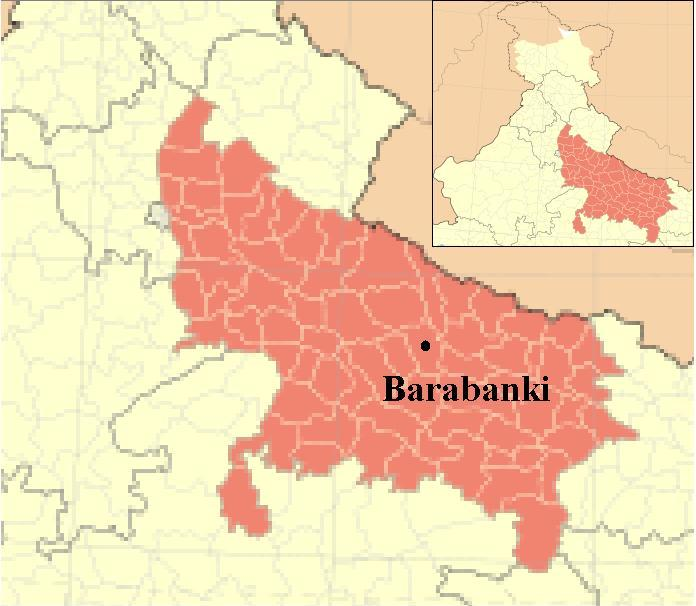
Location of the Barabanki district in Uttar Pradesh, India

Bhitauli is a village situated about 20 km from Lucknow, 28 km from Dubagga and less than 10 km from Barabanki city, in Barabanki district, India. Jugaur railway station on Lucknow Barabanki line is 2 km from Bhitauli. This village was founded by Syed Salar-Daud, popularly known as Dada Mian in the early 11th century AD.

== History ==
Syed Daud (alias Dada Mian) was a famous religious scholar, a close relative to Syed Salar Masood and a commander of the army of Mahmood Ghaznavi. As Syed Daud was a descendant of Ali through his son (Muhammammed Bin Ali) AKA Muhammad bin Hanafia, a branch of Alvi family was settled in Bhitauli one thousand years before. The tombs (mazaars) of Dada Mian and his granddaughter alias BiBi-Bitiyan still exist in the old graveyard of the village. It is said that men were not allowed to enter in the boundary of the mazaar of Bibi Bitiyan.

The Alvi family has produced some important scholars and poets from this small old village. Hafiz Abdullah, Mullavi Asad Ullah, a scholar and teacher at Nadwatul-ulama, Maulana Muhammad Younus, a disciple of Shaikhul Hind Maulana Mahmoodul Hasan and editor of weekly Payyaam-e-Insaniyat and monthly Irfan, are a few examples. He was married to Kuthsiyah-Bibi, a daughter of the great scholar and famous Sufi Syed Shah Waris Hasan. This village has a beautiful location surrounded by gardens, ponds, and green fields, adjacent to a large canal.

There was a large pond surrounded by wild trees and plants close to the canal. It was a beautiful location to enjoy nature under the moon light. The surface of the pool has been covered by spotless white lotus flowers during the season. It presented a unique picture of the pond in the moonlight. As the whiteness of lotus flowers resembled to the whiteness of milk, it seemed that the pond was filled with milk instead of water. The pond has got its name "dudha-tali" (the pond of milk) due to its pristine view.

Its important to note that the actual/original name of Bhitauli is "Bhit-Wali", Which means the gathering place are abode of saints/DURVAISH. The name indicates the historical background of the old village Bhitauli. But with the passage of time the pronunciation was changed by the native people of the surrounding area.
