= KD Singh =

KD Singh may refer to:

- K. D. Singh (field hockey) (1922–1978), also Kunwar Digwijay Singh or K. D. Singh Babu, Indian field hockey player
- KD Singh (cricketer) (born 1981), Indian cricketer
- K. D. Singh (politician) (born 1961), Indian politician

== See also ==
- K. D. Singh Babu Stadium (disambiguation)
