= Government Polytechnic Barabanki =

Government technical education institute in India

Coordinates: 26°57′35″N 81°12′12″E

- Established: 1982
- Faculty: 9
- Staff: 15
- Location: Barabanki, Uttar Pradesh, IND
- Website: http://www.gpbarabanki.com

Government Polytechnic Barabanki (GPBbk) founded in 1982, is a government technical education institute in India. The polytechnic is affiliated to Uttar Pradesh Board of Technical Education and approved by All India Council for Technical Education. It falls under central zone of UPBTE.

== Location ==
The polytechnic is located at outskirts of Barabanki city off Dewa road at Jahangirabad road near Barabanki division of UP State Spinning Mill in Barabanki industrial area of Somaya Nagar.

== Courses ==
It has three Wings:

1. Engineering/Technology
2. Management
3. Vocational

Following is the list of courses conducted in GPBbk:

Course	Seats	Duration	Reference
Diploma in Electronics Engineering	60	3 year	
Diploma in Modern Consumer Electronics Appliances	60	3 year	
Post Graduate Diploma in Marketing & Sales Management	60	1 year	
Various Short term vocational courses e.g. Wireman, Automobile Repairing Mechanic, Electrician, Hand Pump Mechanic, etc.	-	Variable	

The institutes enrolls over 350 students, 9 teachers and over 15 supporting staff.

== Strengthening of Government Polytechnic institute in Barabanki ==
In 2010 a scheme for the strengthening of Government Polytechnic Barabanki (including construction of computer building, installation of computer and supply of equipment) in Barabanki at a cost of Rs. 78 lakh was approved by Ministry of Human Resource Development, Ministry of Minority Affairs and Government of Uttar Pradesh.

In March 2011 Government Polytechnic Barabanki was selected under Scheme of Up-gradation of Existing Polytechnics and amount of Rs. 10 lakh was sanctioned for the up-gradation.

In March 2011 Government Polytechnic Barabanki was selected under Scheme of Construction of Women’s Hostels and total amount of Rs. 70 lakh was sanctioned for it in two instalments first installment of Rs. 20 lakh and second of Rs. 50 lakh.

== Government Polytechnic Institute at Zaidpur ==
State Government has proposed for an amount of Rs.738.21 lakh for construction of polytechnic institute including one girl's hostel at Zaidpur. The proposal has been approved by the State Technical Education Department of Uttar Pradesh.
