= Inayat Ahmad Kakorvi =

Indian Islamic scholar

- Born: 5 October 1813; Barabanki, Oudh State
- Died: 7 April 1863 (aged 49)
- Occupations: Revolutionary, writer, judge
- Known for: Islamic scholarship, the Indian independence movement
- Movement: Indian independence movement

Inayat Ahmad Kakorvi (5 October 1813 – 7 April 1863) was an Islamic scholar and a key figure in the Indian independence movement. He played a significant role in promoting Islamic teachings and contributing to the political landscape of British India.

== Early life and education ==
Kakorvi was born on 5 October 1813 in Barabanki, a town located in the British Raj, which is present-day India. He displayed a keen interest in Islamic studies and pursued an extensive education in religious sciences.

== Contributions ==
As an Islamic scholar, Mufti Inayat Ahmad Kakorvi made significant contributions to the understanding and dissemination of Islamic teachings. He authored numerous books. One of his books Ilm Ul Seegha is part of the curriculum of Dars-i-Nizami.

In addition to his scholarly pursuits, Kakorvi actively participated in the Indian independence movement.

== Death ==
Inayat Ahmad Kakorvi died on 7 April 1863, at the age of 49, as a result of drowning.
