= Government Inter College Barabanki =

Location
- Lucknow-Faizabad Road; Barabanki, Uttar Pradesh, 225001; India
- Coordinates: 26°55′31″N 81°11′39″E

Information
- School type: Government
- School board: UP Board
- School district: Barabanki
- Principal: Radhey Shyam
- Gender: Boys
- Campus: Barabanki city (suburban)

Government Inter College Barabanki or GIC-Barabanki is one of the oldest middle schools of Barabanki city, Uttar Pradesh, India. It was established in 1883.

GIC-Barabanki is governed by Uttar Pradesh Board of High School and Intermediate Education, Allahabad.

== Famous staff members ==
- Maudid Ali, Ex Principal

== Famous alumni ==
- K. D. Singh
