= Parijatham =

Parijatham or Paarijatham may refer to:

- Parijatham (1950 film), Indian Tamil-language film
- Paarijatham (1976 film), Indian Malayalam-language film
- Parijatham (2006 film), Indian Tamil-language film
- Parijatham (2011 TV series), Indian TV series broadcast by Star Vijay
- Paarijatham (2008 TV series), Indian TV series
- Parijatham (2025 TV series), Indian Tamil-language series

== See also ==
- Parijata, the night-flowering jasmine in Hindu mythology
- Parijat (disambiguation)
