= Barabanki =

City in Uttar Pradesh, India

- City
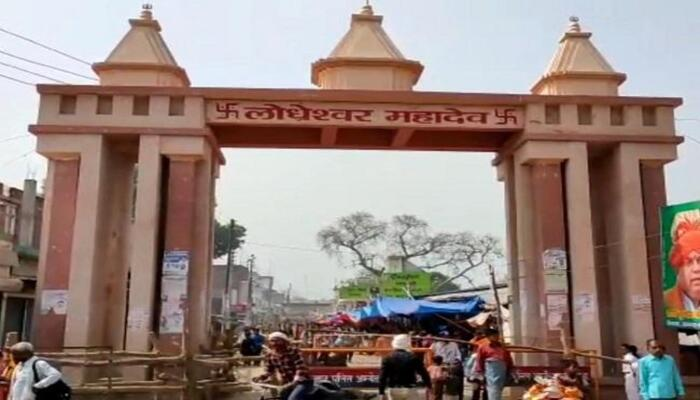
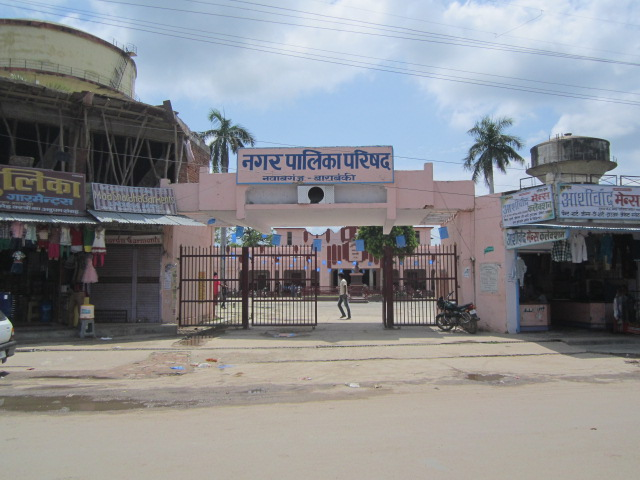
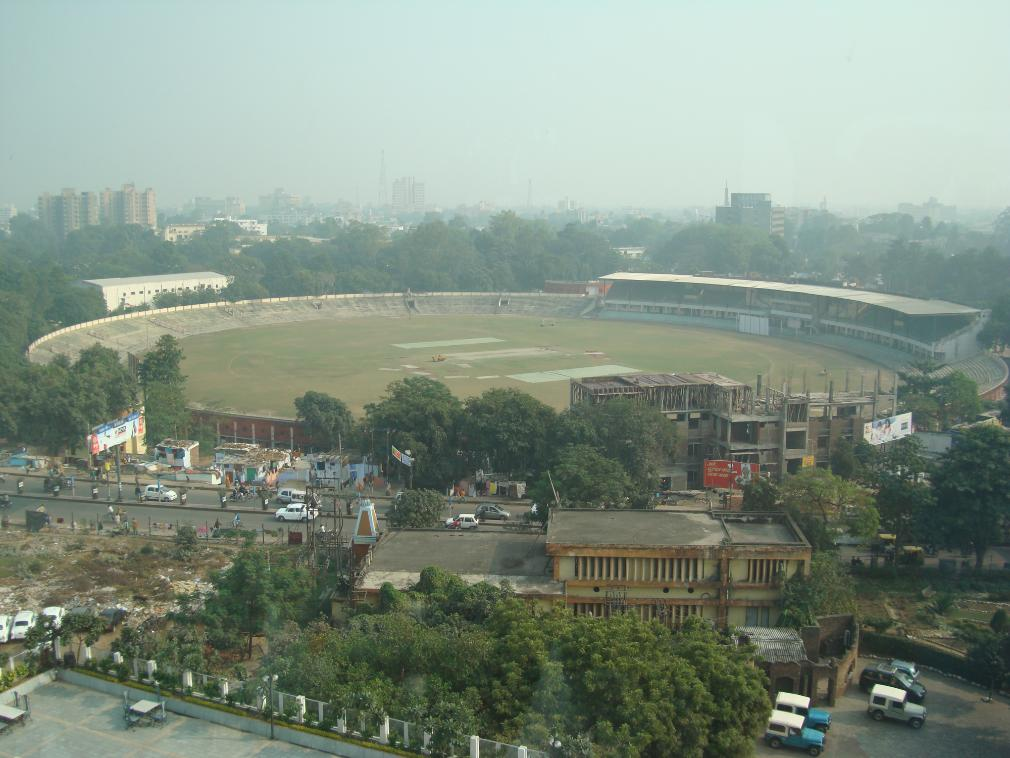
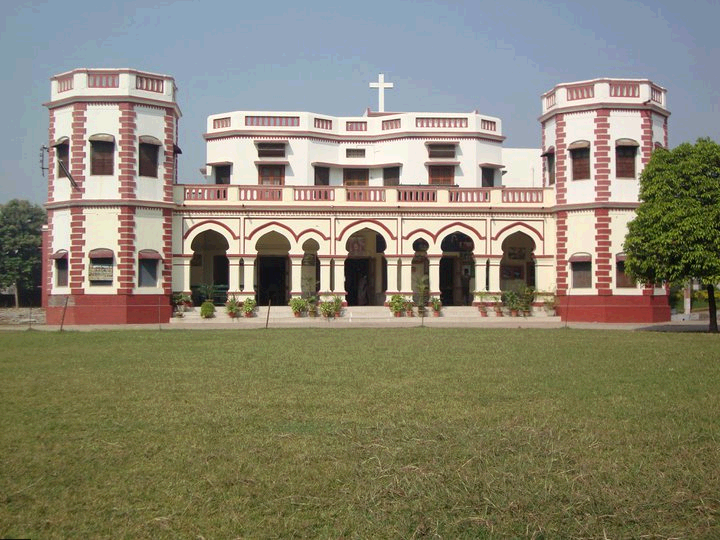
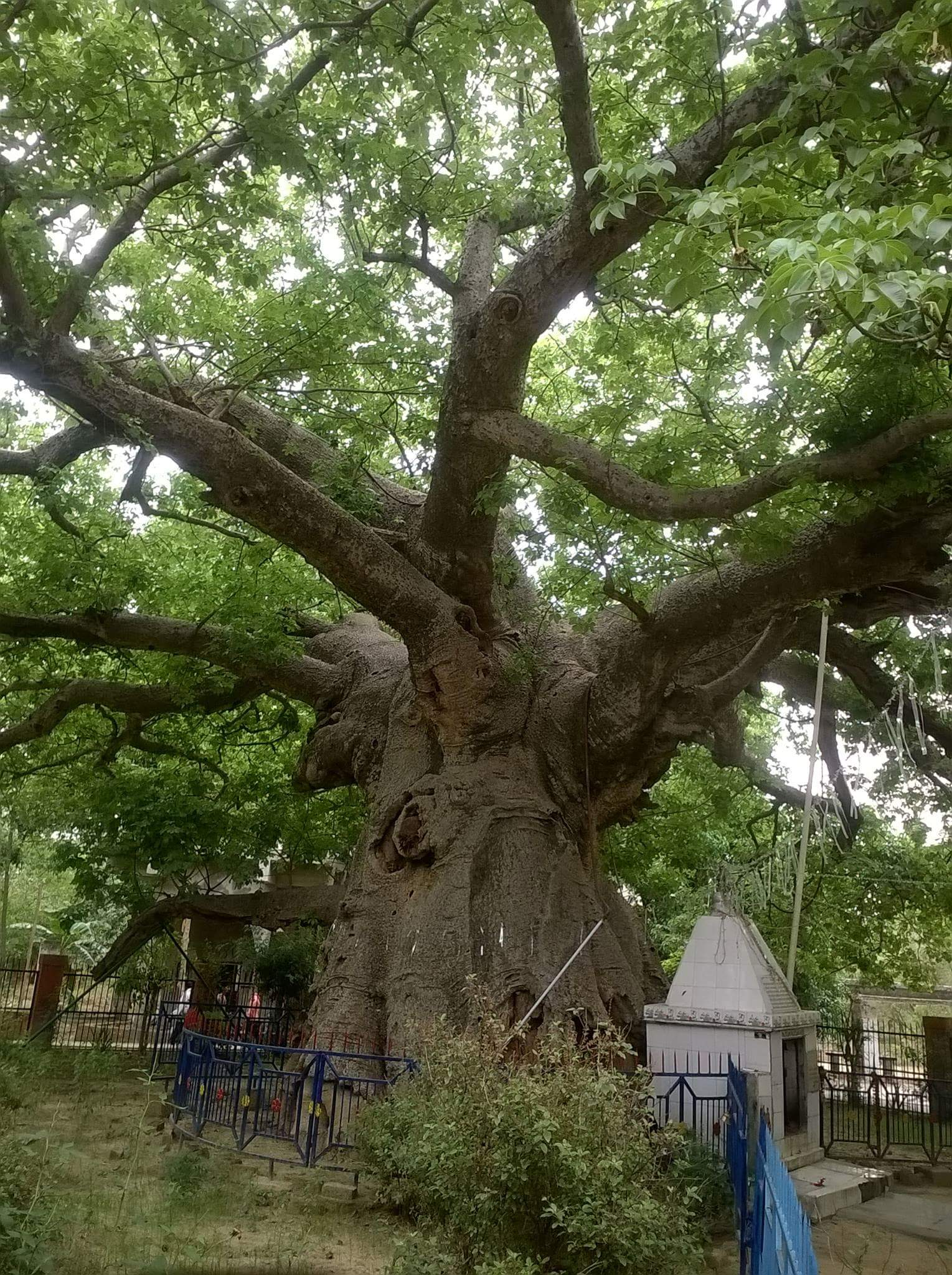
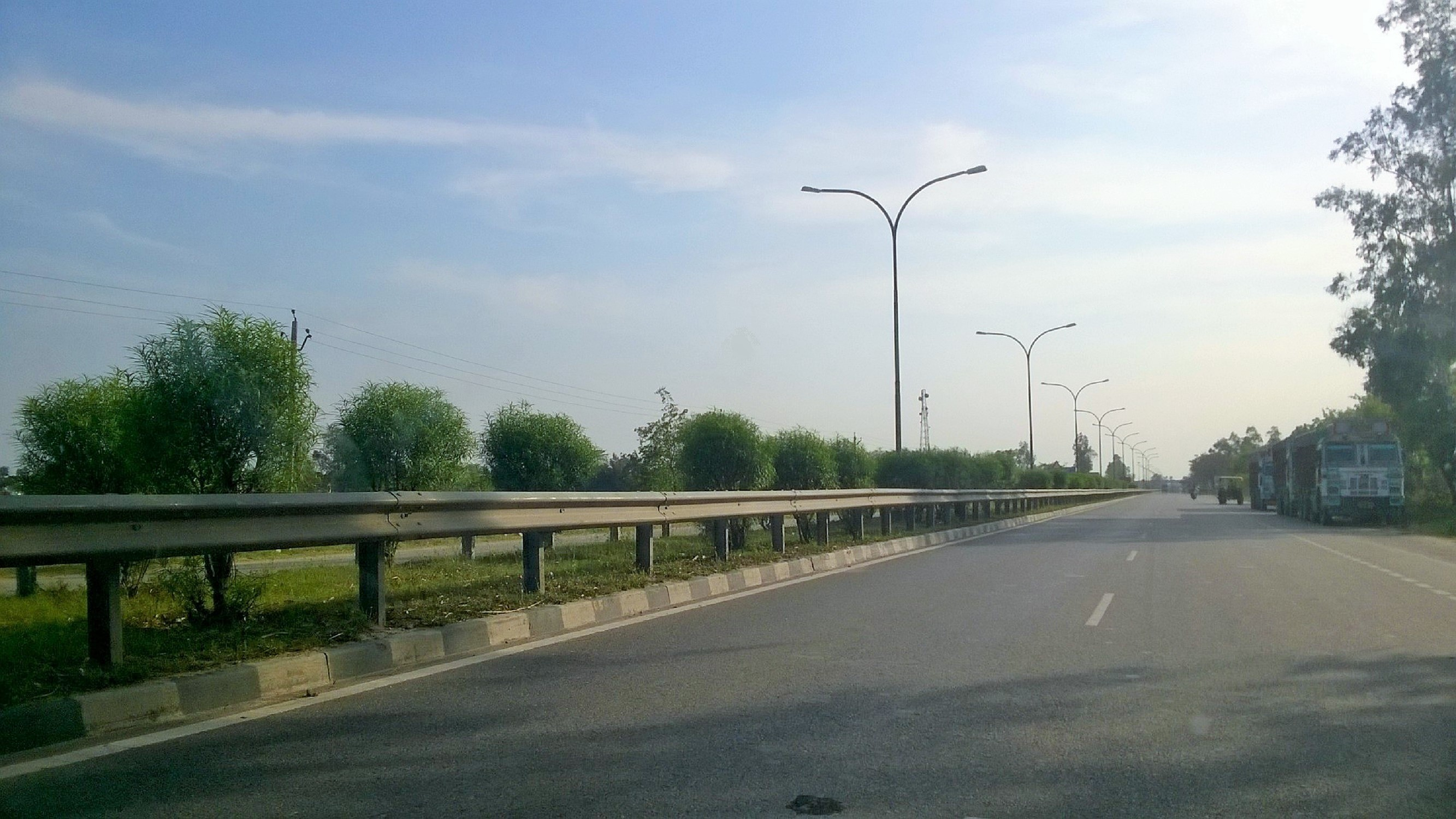
- Lodheshwar Mahadev Mandir Barabanki Municipal Council K D Singh Babu Stadium Anand Bhawan School Parijaat tree, Kintoor National Highway 28

- Location in Uttar Pradesh, India Barabanki (India)
- Coordinates: 26°55′34.834″N 81°11′34.741″E
- Country: India
- State: Uttar Pradesh
- Region: Awadh
- Division: Ayodhya
- District: Barabanki

Government
  - Type: Municipal council
  - Body: Barabanki Municipal Council
  - District Magistrate and Collector: Shashank Tripathi (IAS)

Area
  - Total: 45 km^{2} (17 sq mi)
- Elevation: 100 m (330 ft)

Population (2011)
  - Total: 146,831
  - Density: 331/km^{2} (860/sq mi)

Language
  - Official: Hindi
  - Additional official: Urdu
  - Literacy: 80%
- Time zone: UTC+5:30 (IST)
- PIN: 225 001
- Telephone code: 05248
- Vehicle registration: UP-41
- Website: barabanki.nic.in

Barabanki is a city and a municipal board in the Indian state of Uttar Pradesh. It is the administrative headquarters of Barabanki district and a part of Ayodhya division. The city is about 27 kilometres east of Lucknow, the state capital. It has a population of 146,831 with a density of 331.00 per square kilometre (860.0/sq mi).

== History ==
The Barabanki district was first established by the British upon their annexation of Oudh State in 1856. Originally, the district was known as Daryabad district because its headquarters were at Daryabad, but in 1859 they were relocated to Barabanki. The name "Barabanki" was chosen for the district's official name over "Nawabganj", then the more common name of the town, for two reasons: first, to avoid any possible confusion with other places called Nawabganj, and second, because the civil station was technically located outside of Nawabganj in the small revenue village of Barabanki. Previously, under the Nawabs of Awadh, the area that would become Barabanki district was divided among five chaklas: Daryabad-Rudauli, Ramnagar, Dewa-Jahangirabad Raj, Jagdispur, and Haidargarh.

== Geography ==
=== Climate ===
Barabanki has humid subtropical climate (Köppen climate classification Cwa). The summers here are extremely hot due to proximity to tropics. The temperatures in the summer soar up to 40 to 45 degree celsius. Monsoon last from mid June to mid September. Winters are mild as it has tropical climate. In winters day time temperature rises up to 26 to 29, and at night drop up to 11 degrees.

Climate data for Barabanki, Uttar Pradesh (1991–2020, extremes 1989–2020)
Month	Jan	Feb	Mar	Apr	May	Jun	Jul	Aug	Sep	Oct	Nov	Dec	Year
Record high °C (°F)	29.0 (84.2)	35.5 (95.9)	40.5 (104.9)	44.5 (112.1)	45.5 (113.9)	47.0 (116.6)	44.5 (112.1)	38.5 (101.3)	38.4 (101.1)	38.0 (100.4)	35.5 (95.9)	30.5 (86.9)	47.0 (116.6)
Mean daily maximum °C (°F)	20.9 (69.6)	25.8 (78.4)	31.8 (89.2)	37.6 (99.7)	38.9 (102.0)	37.3 (99.1)	33.6 (92.5)	33.0 (91.4)	32.9 (91.2)	32.6 (90.7)	28.8 (83.8)	23.2 (73.8)	31.5 (88.7)
Mean daily minimum °C (°F)	8.2 (46.8)	11.3 (52.3)	15.4 (59.7)	20.5 (68.9)	24.2 (75.6)	26.3 (79.3)	26.3 (79.3)	26.0 (78.8)	24.9 (76.8)	20.0 (68.0)	14.0 (57.2)	9.4 (48.9)	19.0 (66.2)
Record low °C (°F)	0.8 (33.4)	3.0 (37.4)	7.5 (45.5)	8.7 (47.7)	15.7 (60.3)	20.3 (68.5)	22.2 (72.0)	20.6 (69.1)	17.5 (63.5)	13.0 (55.4)	6.3 (43.3)	1.6 (34.9)	0.8 (33.4)
Average rainfall mm (inches)	20.0 (0.79)	18.8 (0.74)	12.4 (0.49)	7.3 (0.29)	32.8 (1.29)	117.0 (4.61)	258.3 (10.17)	218.9 (8.62)	161.2 (6.35)	32.1 (1.26)	6.0 (0.24)	6.6 (0.26)	891.4 (35.09)
Average rainy days	1.4	0.5	1.4	0.7	2.0	5.3	11.4	10.1	6.5	1.3	0.3	0.4	42.5
Average relative humidity (%) (at 17:30 IST)	65	54	42	35	42	56	75	78	75	66	62	65	60
Source: India Meteorological Department

== Demographics ==
As per provisional data of the 2011 census, the Barabanki urban agglomeration had a population of 146,831, with 77,766 males and 69,065 females. The literacy rate was 81.85%.

Barabanki District is classified by the national government as a "Minority Concentrated District in India" and Barabanki city is classified as a Muslim-majority city in the government files.

== Administration ==
Barabanki city comprises:

1. Barabanki village (revenue village)
2. Nawabganj (tehsil)
3. Banki (town area)
4. Barel (village)
5. Satrikh (village)
6. Kurauli (village)
7. 252 Bomb Disposal Company (cantonment)
8. Suburbs

== Places of interest ==
- Parijaat tree, Kintoor

== Transport ==
=== By road ===
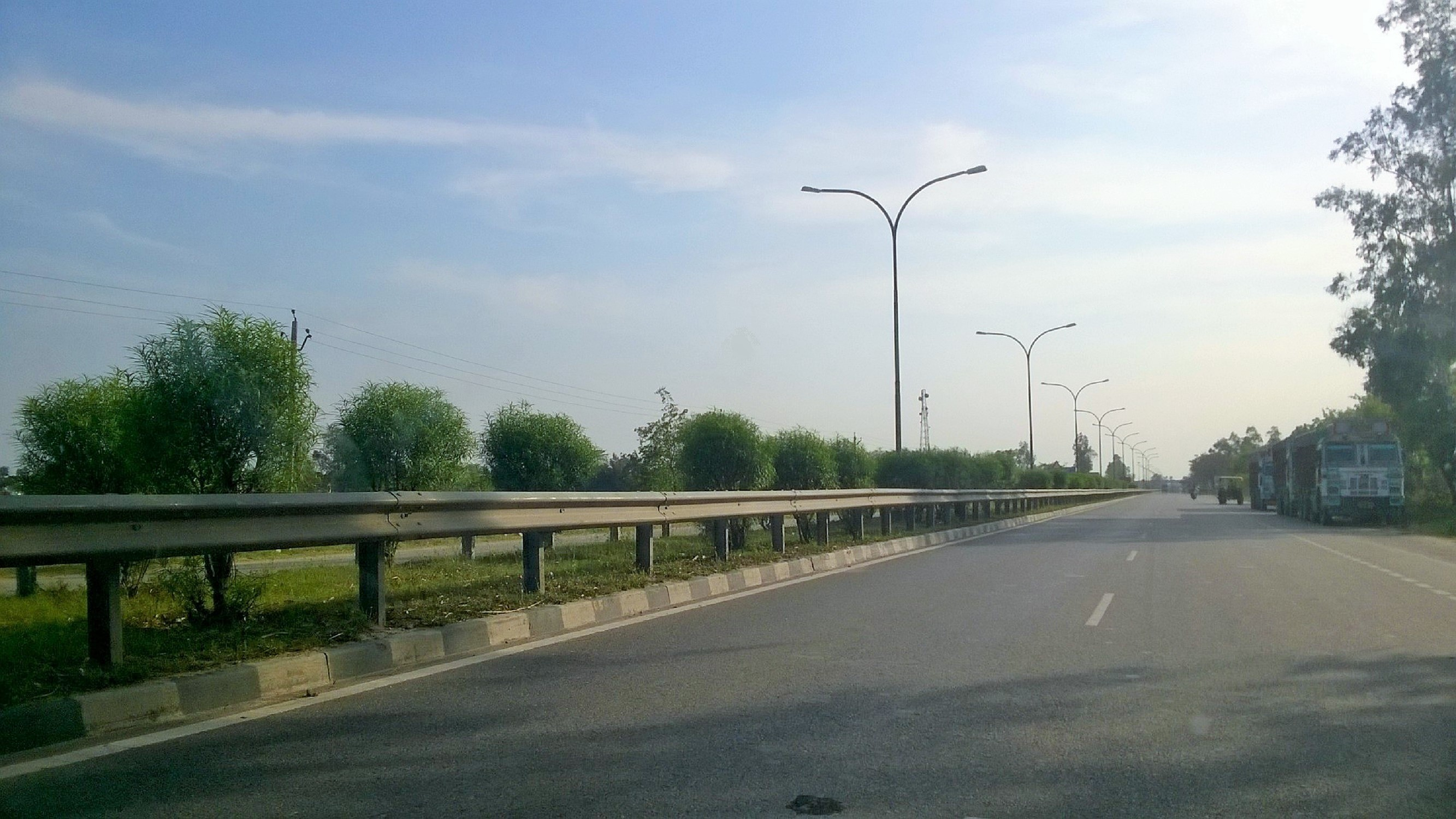
Lucknow Ayodhya Road

National Highway 28 (NH-28) passes through the district. It is well connected to other cities by means of roadways. Passenger road transport services in Uttar Pradesh started in 1947 with the operation of bus service on the Lucknow–Ayodhya-Gorakhpur route by UP Government Roadways.

- National Highway 27 (India)
- Barabanki-Lakhimpur (NH727H)
- Barabanki-Nepalganj Border (NH927)
- Lucknow-Ayodhya-Gorkhapur-Guwahati Highway (NH27)

==== Expressway ====
Purvanchal Expressway is an 340 km long, 6 lane wide (expandable to 8) greenfield expressway project in the state of Uttar Pradesh, India. It will pass through 9 districts including Barabanki.

=== By rail ===
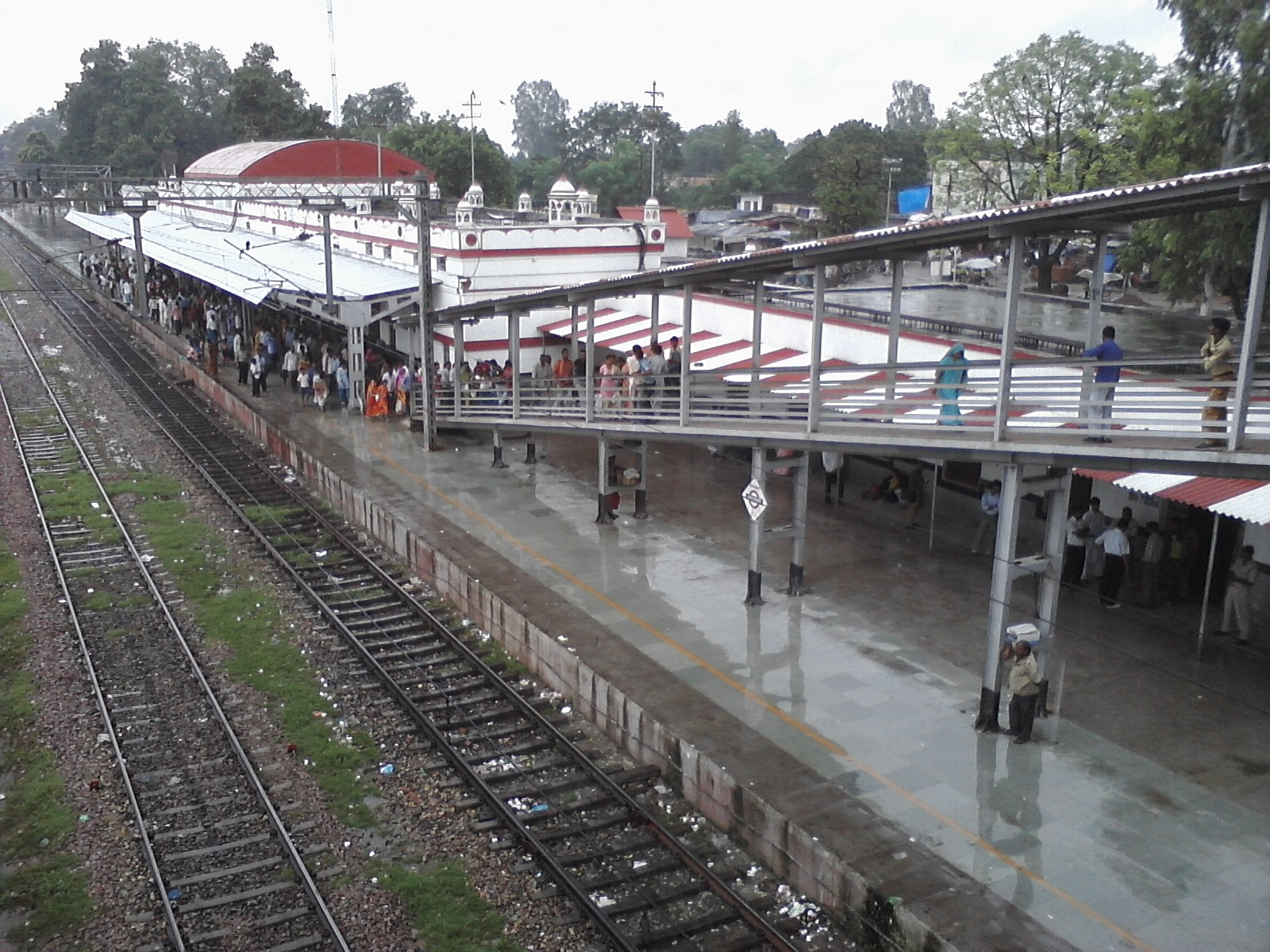
Barabanki Jn Railway Station Inside View

Barabanki Junction railway station is the intercity rail station and a commuter rail hub in the Indian city of Barabanki. It has been important junction since the days of British control of India. In its category it is one of the important stations in NER. The Barabanki Junction railway station is on the Delhi– Basti– Gorakhpur main broad-gauge route in Uttar Pradesh. Barabanki Junction is also the hub for the Barabanki–Lucknow Suburban Railway. Barabanki railway station lies in the zone of high density stations.

=== By air ===
The nearest airport to Barabanki is Chaudhary Charan Singh International Airport at Amausi, Lucknow which is approximately 40 km from Barabanki.

== Education ==
=== Schools and intermediate colleges ===
- Government Inter College, Barabanki city
- Jawahar Navodaya Vidyalaya, Sonikpur, Trivediganj, Barabanki
- Saraswati Shishu Mandir, Barabanki city

=== Engineering colleges ===
- Jahangirabad Institute of Technology, Fort
- Sagar Institute of Technology & Management, Faizabad Road

=== Polytechnic institute ===
- Government Polytechnic Barabanki, Jahangirabad Road

=== Other professional institutions ===
- Jahangirabad Media Institute, Fort

=== Research institutions ===
- International Rice Research Institute - branch Tikarhar Road, Kursi, Barabanki

== Notable people ==
- Khumar Barabankvi, poet
- Suroor Barabankvi, poet
- Inayat Ahmad Kakorvi, Islamic scholar and freedom fighter
- Mohsina Kidwai, politician
- Rafi Ahmed Kidwai, politician
- C. M. Naim, scholar of Urdu language and literature
- Naseeruddin Shah, film actor
- Waris Ali Shah, Sufi Saint
- K. D. Singh, hockey player
- Beni Prasad Verma, politician, Member of Parliament
- Ram Sewak Yadav, politician and member of parliament

== Gallery ==
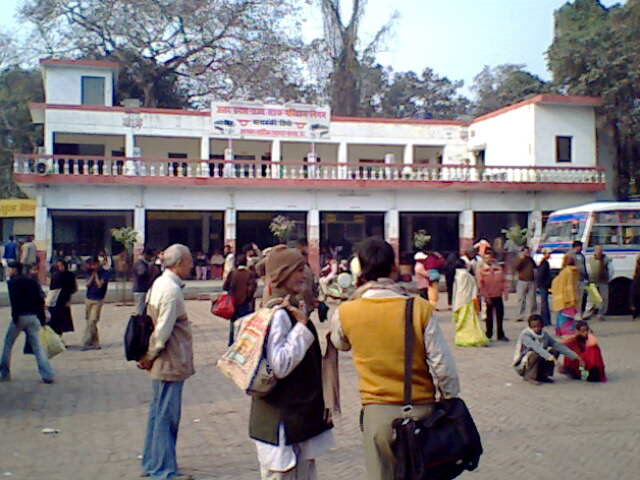
Barabanki UPSRTC Bus Station

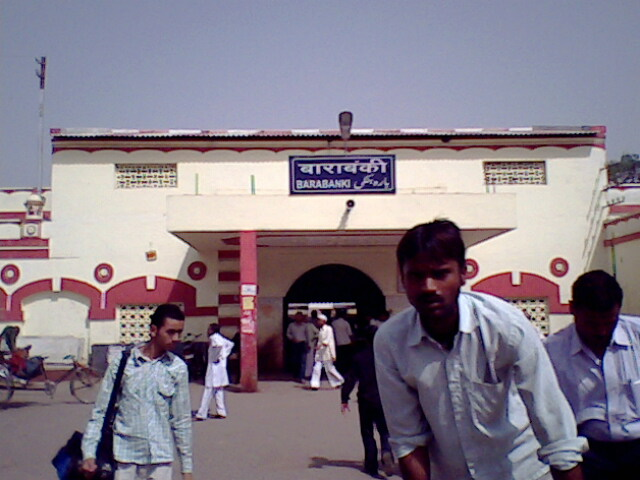
Exterior of Barabanki Jn Railway Station

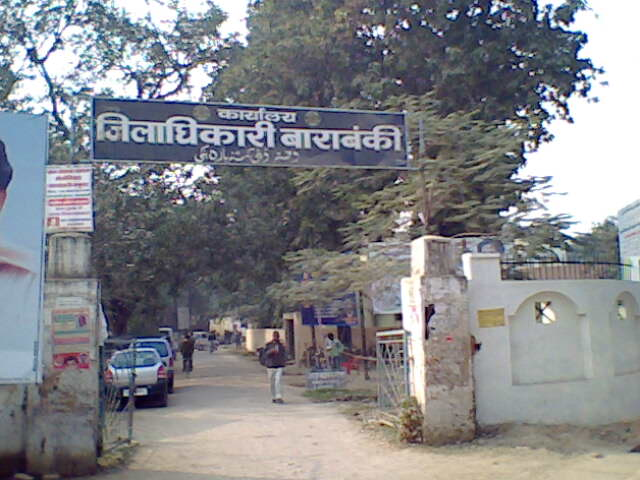
Office of District Magistrate/Collector

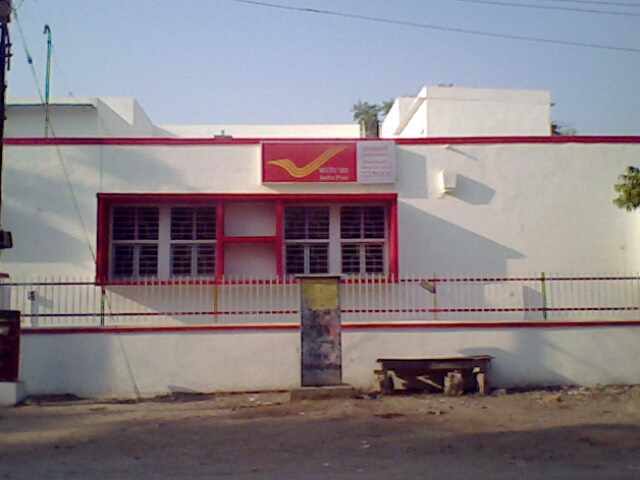
Barabanki Head Post Office

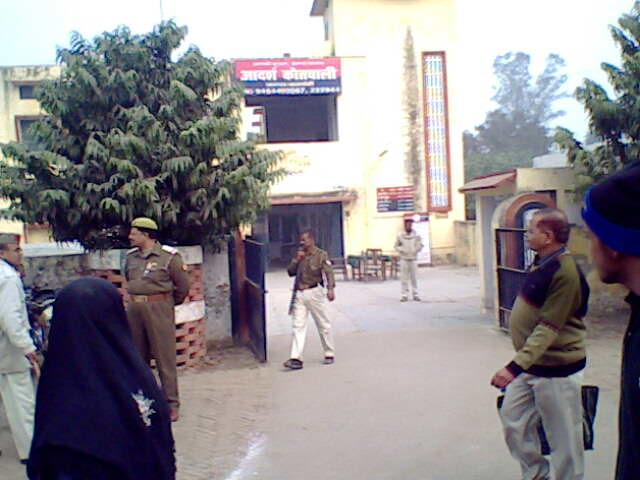
Barabanki Kotwaali

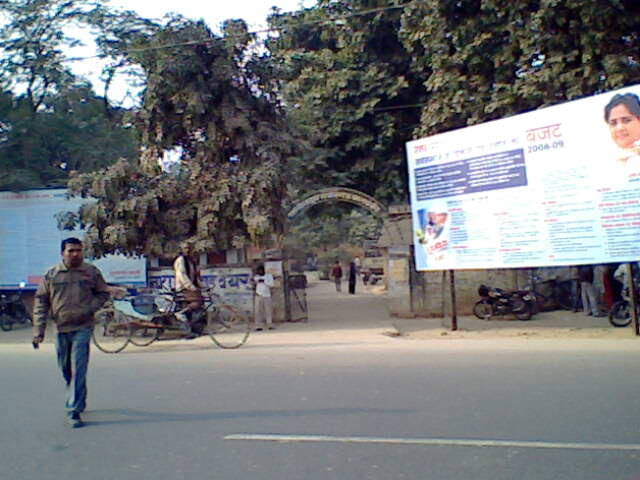
Office of Tehsildar of Tehsil Nawabganj, Barabanki on Lucknow-Faizabad Road (NH-28)

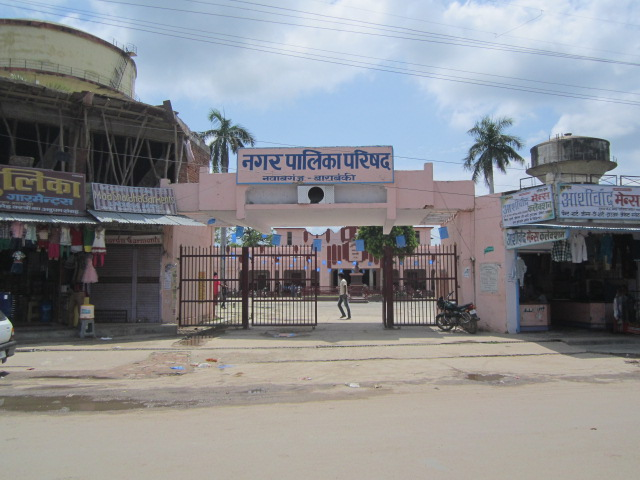
Nagar Parishad Nawabganj

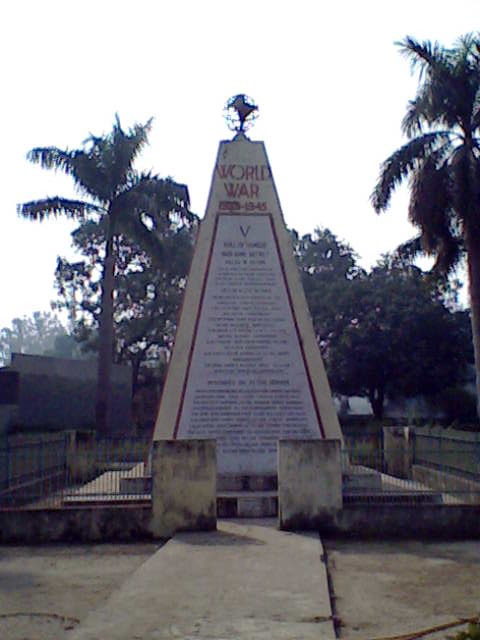
Shahid Smarak (a World War II memorial)

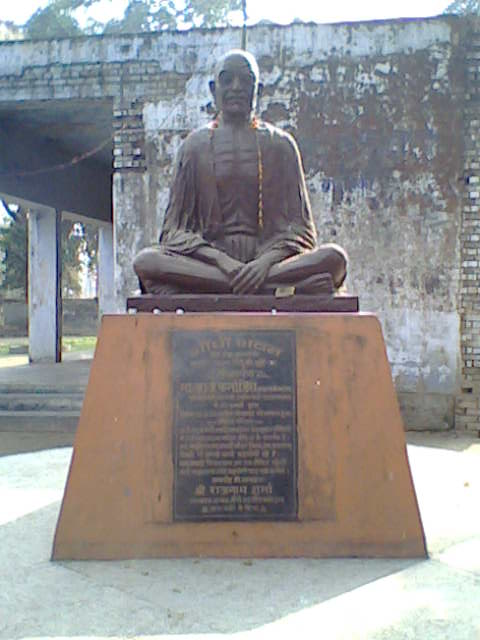
Statue of Mahatma Gandhi at Baapu Bhawan at Dewa Road

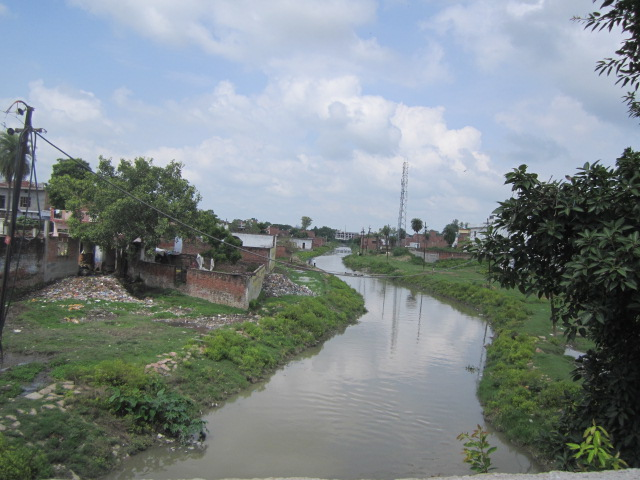
Jamuriya Nala (a brook) from Railway Station Road Bridge. This brook flows through the city and divides it into two halves.

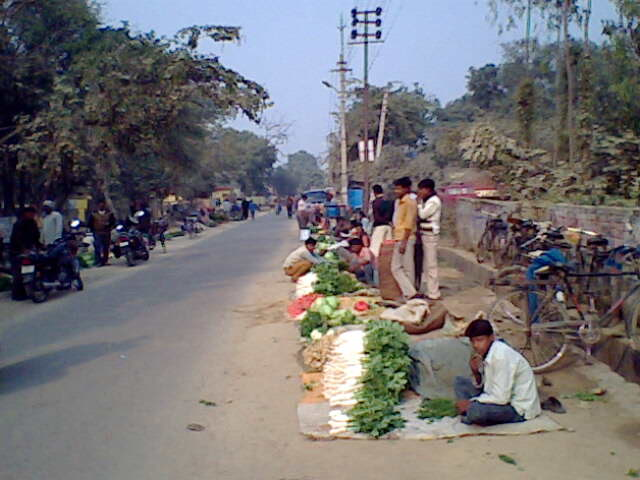
Evening vegetable bazaar along Court Road

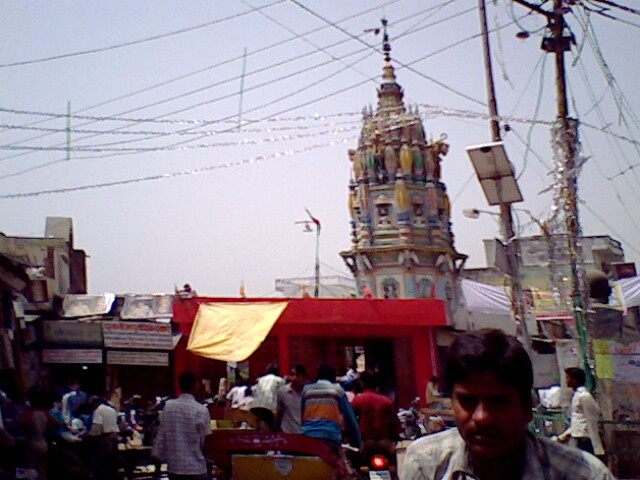
Exterior of Dhanokhar Mandir (a temple dedicated primarily to Lord Hanuman) from Dhanokhar Chauraha. This temple has a moderate sized pond at its back.

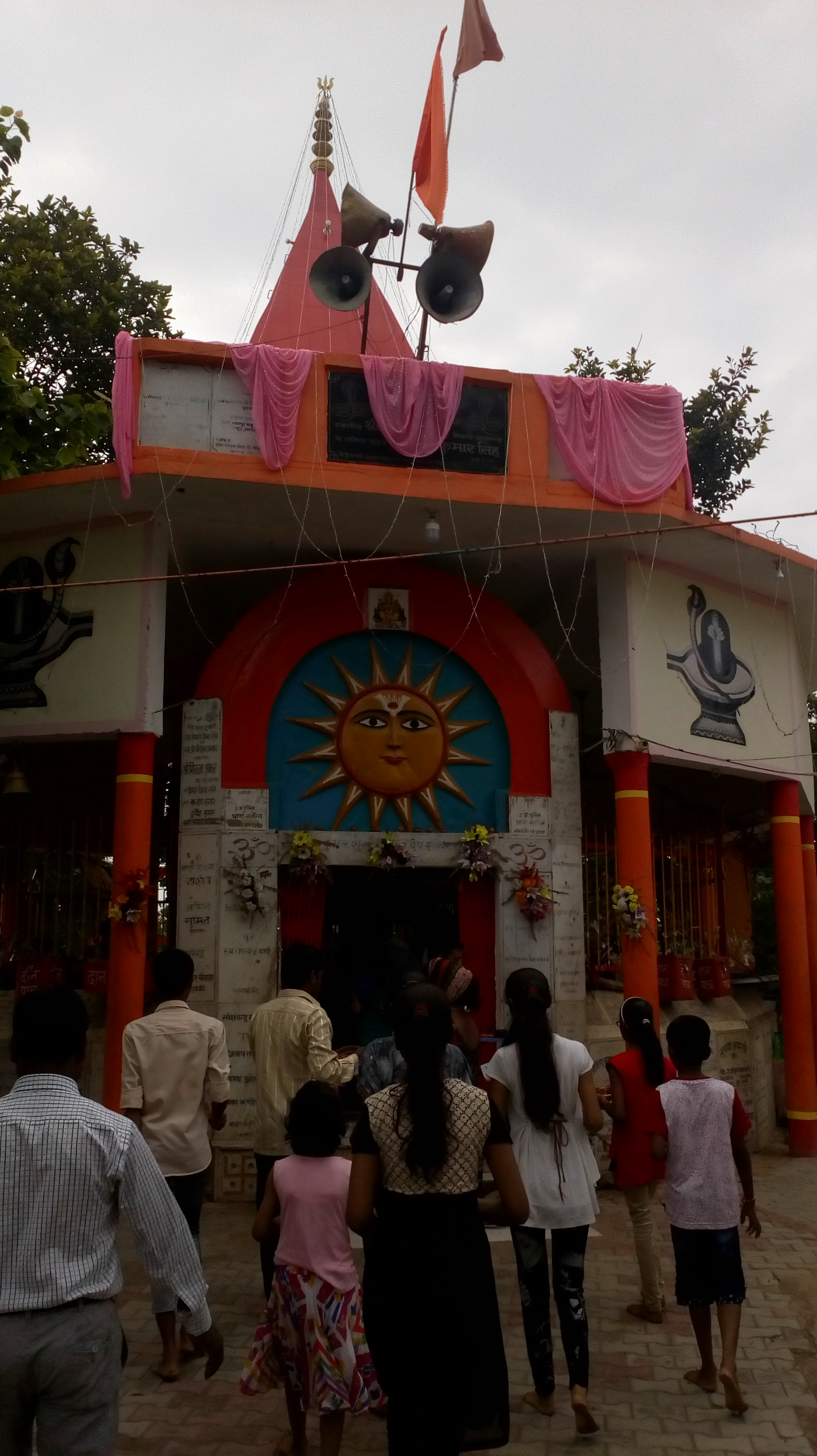
Shree Nag Devta Temple during Manjitha Fair on the day of Naga Panchami

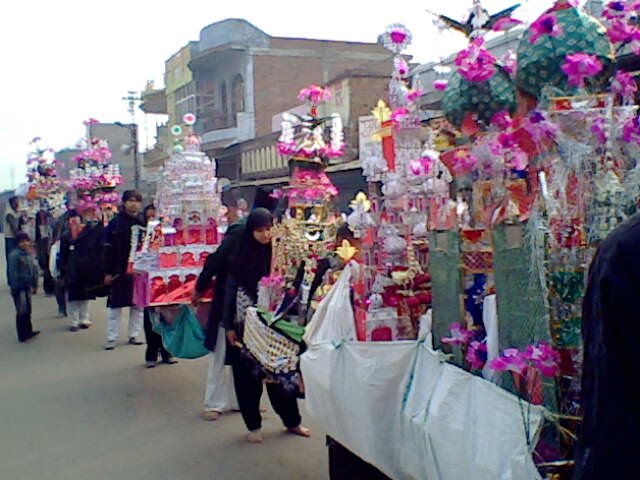
Shia Muslims on a tazia procession on the Day of Ashura

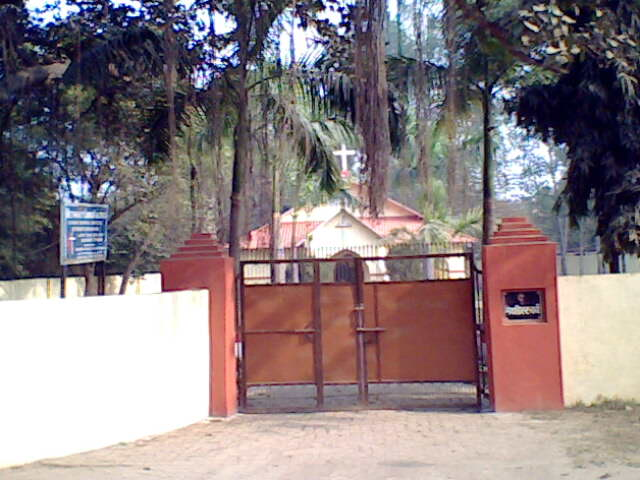
Exterior of Methodist Church on Court Road
