= Parijaat tree, Kintoor =

Sacred baobab tree in Uttar Pradesh, India

Coordinates: 27°00′12.5″N 81°28′54.8″E

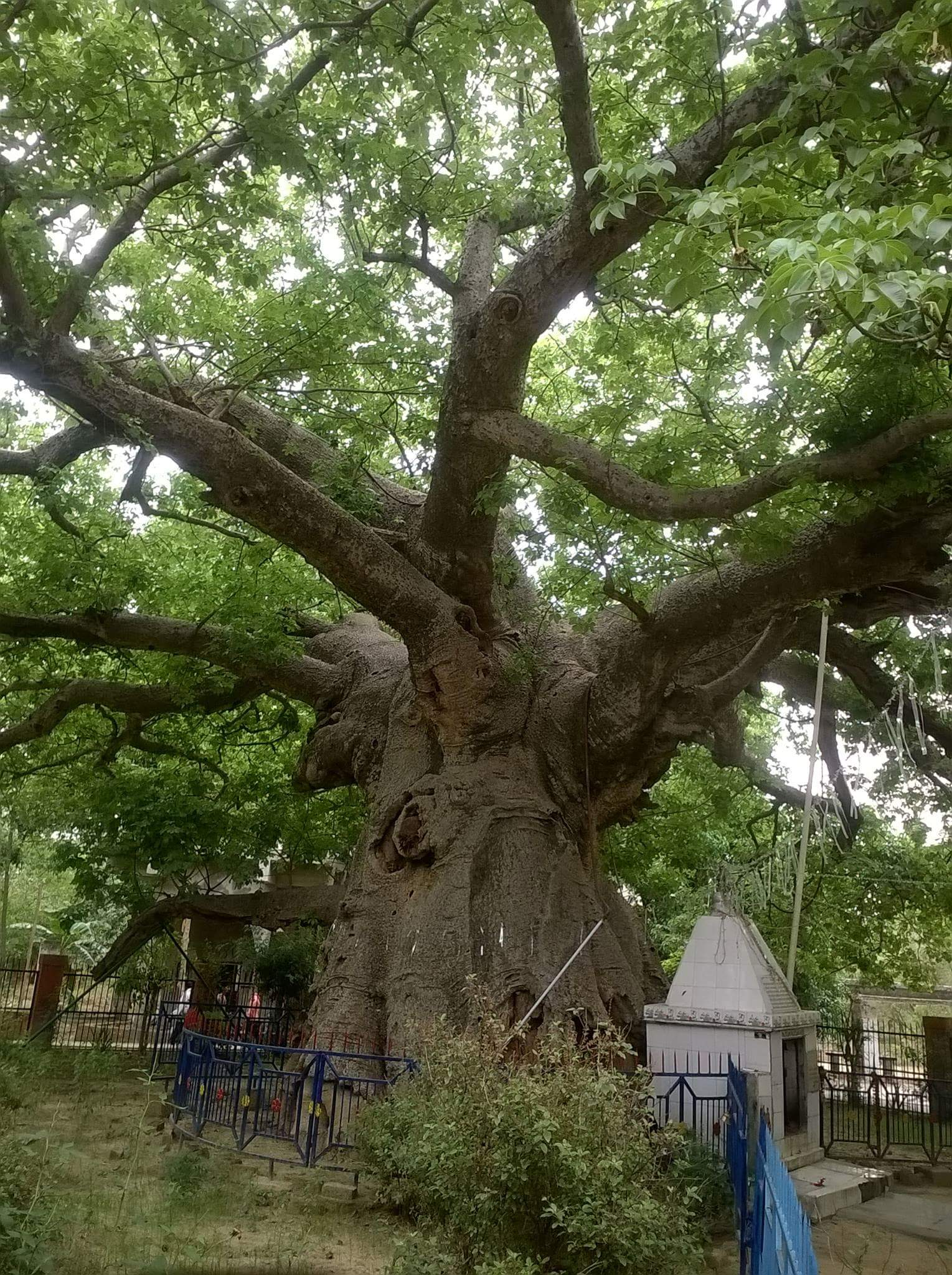
Parijat tree at Kintoor, Barabanki

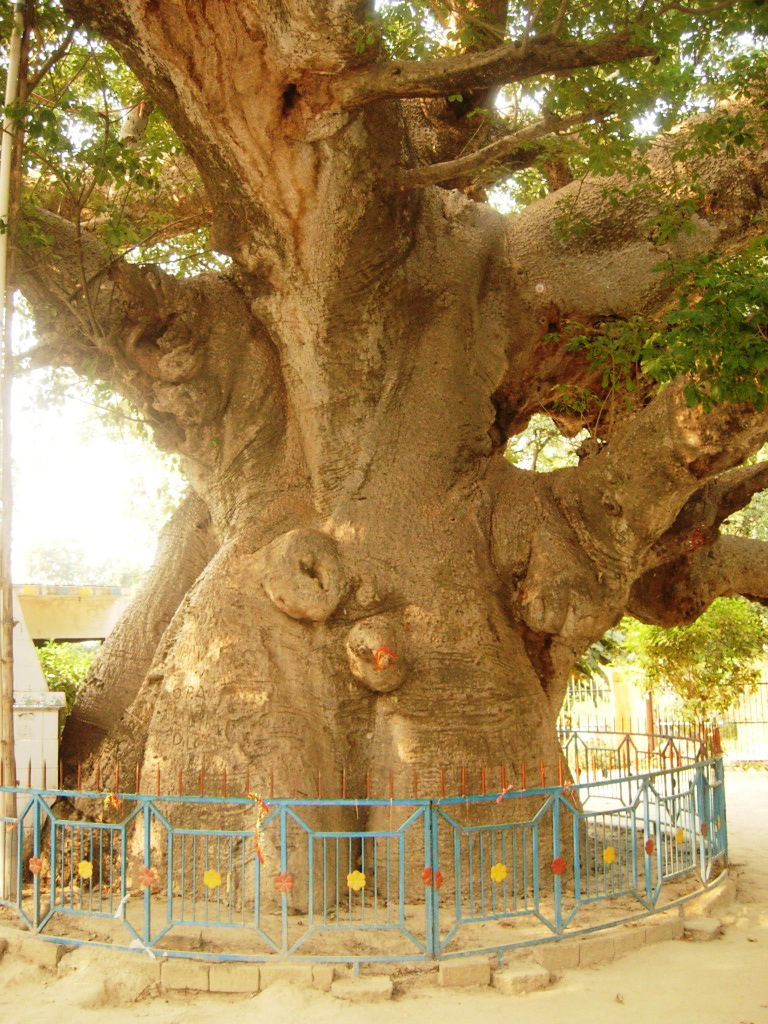
Parijat tree at Kintoor, Barabanki

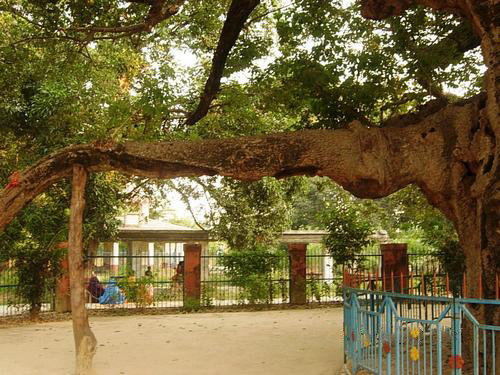
Parijat tree at Kintoor, Barabanki

The Parijaat tree is a sacred baobab tree in the village of Kintoor, near Barabanki, Uttar Pradesh, India, about which there are several legends.

It is a protected tree situated in Barabanki district of Uttar Pradesh, India. By the order of local district magistrate, any kind of damage to the tree is strictly prohibited. The tree is known as baobab in modern science which is originated in Sub-sahara Africa and hence its presence in the fertile land of India makes it rare. Also the age of the tree is still not determined, which makes it quite possible that the tree may have been planted by someone who used to travel between India and Africa. The tree needs international attention of scientists to find out more about it. The tree is also known as 'the tree from paradise' due to its mythological significance.

== Ancient facts ==
Kintur, about 38 kilometres (24 mi) east of the district headquarters, Barabanki, was named after Kunti, mother of the Pandavas. There are a number ancient temples and their remains around this place. Near a temple established by Kunti, is a special tree called Parijaat which is said to grow from Kunti's ashes. The radiocarbon date in 2019 of the oldest samples was 793±37 BP for the baobab of Kintoor. The corresponding calibrated age is 775±25 calendar years.

There are a number of legends about this tree which have popular acceptance. One being that Arjun brought this tree from heavens and Kunti used to offer and crown Lord Shiva with its flowers. Another saying being, that Lord Krishna brought this tree for his beloved queen Satyabhama or Rukmini. Historically, though these saying may have some bearing or not, but it is true that this tree is from a very ancient background.

According to the Harivansh Puraan the Parijaat Tree is a Kalpavriksha, or wish bearing tree, which, apart from this tree, is only found in heaven. Newly-weds visit the tree for blessings, and every Tuesday a fair is held where local people worship the tree. In Sikhism's Sukhmani Sahib the tree is mentioned "PaarJaat Eh Har Ko Naam The name of Lord is the mythological tree"
