= Parijatha Vaneswarar Temple =

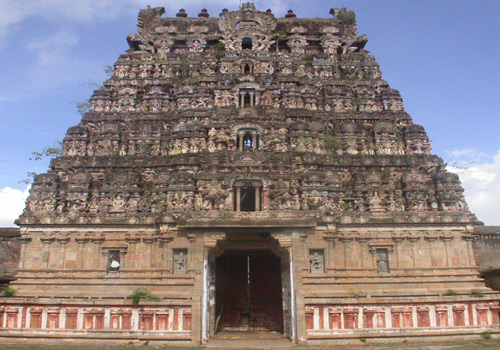

Religion
- Affiliation: Hinduism
- District: Tiruvarur
- Deity: Lord Shiva

Location
- Location: Tirukalar
- State: Tamil Nadu
- Country: India

Parijatha Vaneswarar Temple (பாரிஜாதவனேஸ்வரர் கோயில்) is a Hindu temple located at Tirukalar in the Tiruvarur district of Tamil Nadu, India. Situated at a distance of about 21 kilometres from Mannargudi on the road to Thiruthuraipoondi, the presiding deity of the temple is Shiva.

== Legend ==
The sage Durvasa, having heard of Shiva's cosmic dance (Ananda Tandava) at Chidambaram witnessed by sages Vyaghrapada and Patanjali, desired to see the same. He brought rare Parijatha flowers from the celestial world (Devaloka) and planted them and created a dense of these trees, thus the names Parijatha Vanam, Tharu Vanam etc. are found for this place. Durvasa installed a shivalinga under a Parijatha tree, created a spring, and constructed a temple with the help of the architect Vishwakarma. Pleased with his penance, Shiva granted him the vision of his Brahma Tandava dance. The tamil word kalari means "dance," giving the place its name Thirukkalar. Shiva is also praised as Kalarumalainathar (Lord of the dance floor). The temple depicts Sage Durvasa with folded hands in a worshipping posture, and according to scriptures, he performed the first consecration (kumbhabhishekam) of the temple.

== Significance ==
It is one of the shrines of the 275 Paadal Petra Sthalams. Praises of the temple have been sung by the Saivite saints Sambandar and Thirunavukkarasar in the Thevaram. There are shrines to Ganesha, Somaskanda, Murugan, Durga, Lakshmi, Agastya and the 63 Nayanmars.

== Architecture ==
The temple features an 80 - foot high, five-tiered Rajagopuram facing east. The presiding deity, Shiva, is worshipped as Parijatha Vaneswara (also known as Kalarmulainathar), and the goddess is called Amudhavalli. The temple has sub-shrines for Valampuri Vinayaka, Viswanatha, Somaskanda, and Chandrasekhara. A notable feature is the shrine of Ashtabhuja Durga, decipted in a sitting posture on her lion vehicle, located in the outer mandapam. There is also a separate shrine for Akora Veerabhadra facing west.
