= K. D. Singh Babu Stadium, Barabanki =

Stadium in Barabanki, India

K. D. Singh Babu Stadium
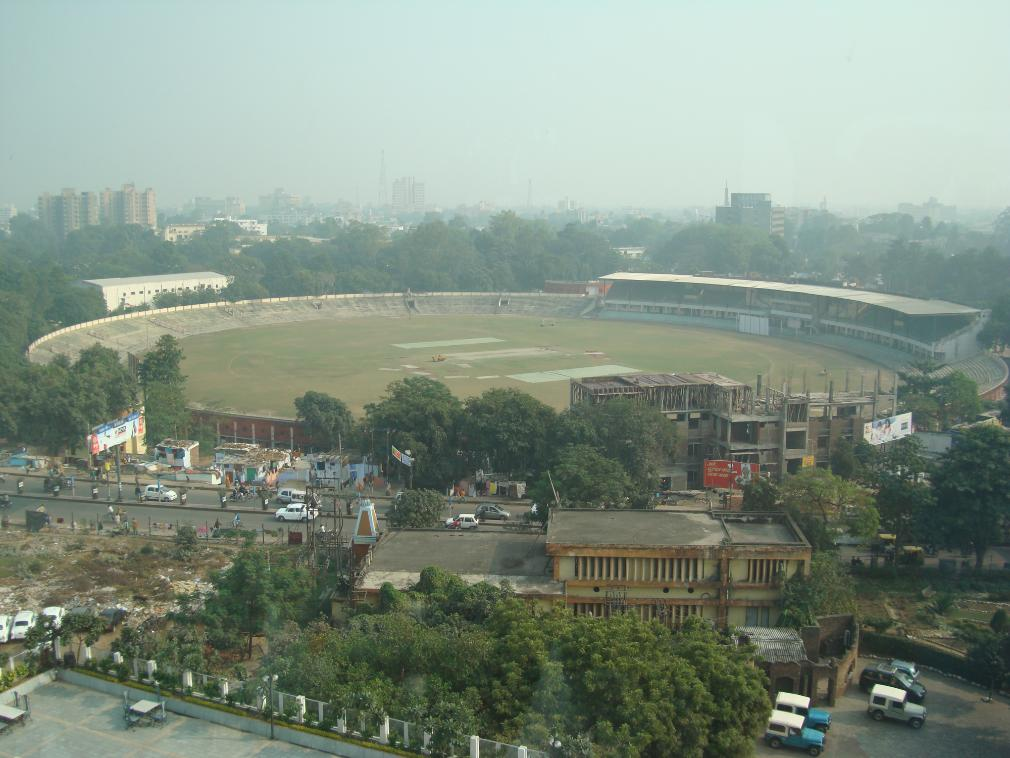
- Interactive map of K. D. Singh Babu Stadium
- Full name: K. D. Singh Babu Stadium
- Location: Barabanki city, Uttar Pradesh, India
- Coordinates: 26°55′30″N 81°11′22″E

The K. D. Singh Babu Stadium, Barabanki, is a district stadium in Barabanki city, named after the famous hockey player K. D. Singh. The stadium is equipped with indoor and outdoor facilities including a swimming pool.

== Championships, tournaments ==
Following events have been held in K. D. Singh Babu Stadium, Barabanki,

- 22nd U.P. Junior/Sub Junior/Senior State Taekwondo Championship' 2004 from 14 to 16 May 2004.
- The inaugural match of the 4th prize-money state cricket tournament organised by the District Sports Welfare Society Barabanki and District Cricket Association Barabanki.
- Matches of the 4th Chaudhary Asif Ali Memorial Prize Money State Cricket Tournament.
- The first semi-final match of the 5th Chaudhary Asif Ali Memorial Prize Money State Cricket Tournament on 13 March 2012.
