= K. D. Singh (field hockey) =

Indian field hockey player (1922–1978)

Kunwar Digvijay Singh
Personal information
- Born: 2 February 1922 Barabanki, United Provinces, British India
- Died: 27 March 1978 (aged 56) Lucknow, Uttar Pradesh, India

Sport
- Sport: Field hockey
- Position: Inside Right
National team
Years	Team	Caps	Goals
1946-mid to late 1950s	India	80+	(175+)
Medal record
Men's field hockey
Representing India
Olympic Games
Gold medal – first place	1948 London	Team competition
Gold medal – first place	1952 Helsinki	Team competition

Kunwar Digvijay Singh (2 February 1922 – 27 March 1978), popularly known as "Babu", was an Indian field hockey player. He was born in Barabanki, Uttar Pradesh. He is widely known for his passing ability and is considered by many to be the greatest dribbler of the game comparable only to Dhyan Chand.

== Education ==
Singh received his early education at the Government High School, Barabanki and Kanyakubj Inter College, Lucknow.

== Career ==
=== Early life ===
Singh was born in Barabanki, Uttar Pradesh. Singh made his foray into field hockey with a tournament played at Dewa Mela, and in the year 1937 represented his college hockey team in an Inter-Collegiate tournament. At a young age of 15 years, he played for the LYA Club, Lucknow at the Traders Cup Tournament in Delhi. In the same tournament, the young team of Lucknow met with a reputed Delhi team, for which Olympic player Mohammed Hussain also played. K.D. Singh was not told that Olympian Hussain was also playing in the rival team so that he could play his natural game. The wizard of the hockey kept Hussain pressing and dodging during the entire match. Hussain was also surprised by the sports skills of this young boy. After the match, Hussain said that this boy would one day become one of the greatest players of the field hockey. He played for the hockey team of Uttar Pradesh in all the national tournaments continuously from 1939 to 1959.

=== As a player ===
Singh was first selected to the All-India Hockey Team in 1946-47 for the tour to Afghanistan. After that there was no looking back and he rose quickly to be one of the deadliest forward the hockey world has known. In 1947, while playing alongside Dhyan Chand during the East Africa tour he outscored the wizard by netting 70 goals while the wizard got 62. Even before he was selected as vice- captain of 1948 Olympic team he was being compared to Dhyan Chand. He played in the capacity of vice-captain in the 1948 Olympic Games. The Indian team won a gold medal on this occasion. The 1948 outing was the first Olympic participation of India as an independent nation, which made the gold medal victory a very important achievement for the nascent nation even though it had won the Olympic gold in 1928, 1932 and 1936. He scored 4 goals in the 1948 Olympics including one in the semi-final against Netherlands. Such was his performance in 1948 Olympics that one of the leading British newspapers wrote:

"Babu's performance was as near to perfection as was possible. Scintillating dribbling and adroit through passes characterized his play and he was the chief instigator in completely tying the dogged England defense. On many occasions he dribbled past whole defence with ease throughout the tournament. He was the brain behind the attacks. It is tempting to write that Babu is as elusive as Dhyan Chand."

He was made captain of the Indian team in 1949, this year out of 236 goals scored, he had netted 99 goals, maximum by any member of the team.

He was the captain of the Indian team, which won the gold medal at the 1952 Helsinki Olympic Games.He scored 2 goals in 1952 Olympics, including one in the quarterfinal and one in the final against Netherlands. His performance in 1952 Olympics was described as 'poetic', where he was the mastermind and playmaker of the team. Former New Zealand captain Cyril Walter wrote:

"I run out of adjectives in trying to describe his superlative dribbling and the timing and geometrical accuracy of his passing. Babu's dribbling is poetry in motion."

He was a legendary field hockey player primarily known for his exceptional dribbling and passing abilities. While it is possible that he scored significantly more goals throughout his career, only 175 goals have been officially documented. These documented goals include those from 1949, a series from 1947 where he outperformed Dhyan Chand, and goals scored in the 1948 and 1952 Olympics. Given that these records only cover specific instances, it’s likely that his actual goal tally is higher. Similarly, while his actual number of appearances may be much higher, around 80 appearances are currently known.

For more information, see the List of men's field hockey players with 100 or more international goals

He received the Helms Trophy in 1953 for being the best hockey player in the world (1952) and the best sportsman of Asia (1953). This was the first time an Indian was awarded the Helms Trophy (America's Nobel Prize in sport given to the best athlete from each continent.)

=== As a coach ===
Singh later served as the coach for Indian hockey team for the 1972 Munich Olympics. K.D. Singh Babu was a member of numerous organisations that include All India Council of Sports, Railway Board, Rifle Association of India and Wild Life Protection Committee of Uttar Pradesh.

== Death ==
On 27 March 1978, he died of a gunshot wound from his own weapon, while cleaning it. It was also speculated that he might have shot himself. Singh was reportedly suffering from depression and was under psychiatric care during his final days. A fellow Olympian and friend of Singh, Ashwini Kumar stated that the former was a "sensitive man" and that he might have "become emotionally upset with the poor showing of the Indian team at the World Cup matches in Buenos Aires."

== In popular culture ==
In the Indian sports-drama film Gold (2018), set in the 1948 Summer Olympics, Amit Sadh played the role of vice captain of the India men's national field hockey team - a character loosely based on K.D. Singh.

== Honours and memorials ==
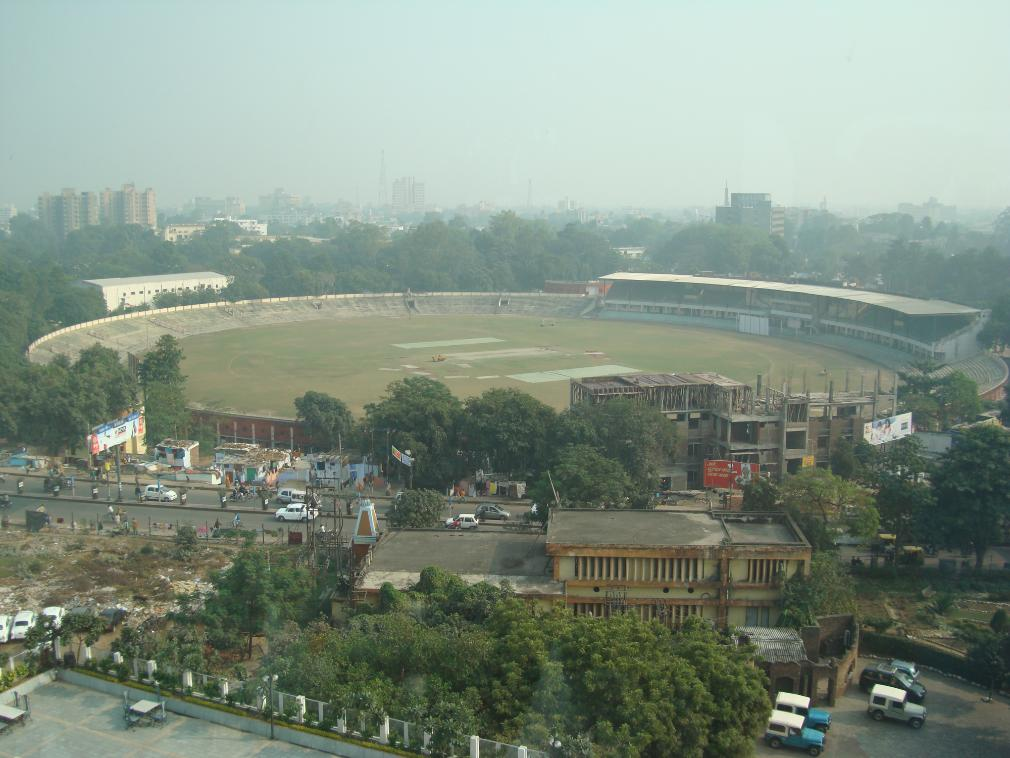
K. D. Singh Babu Stadium, Lucknow

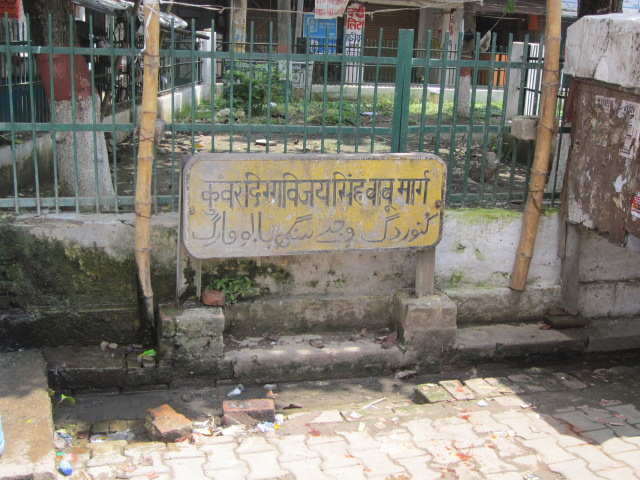
K D Singh Babu Marg, Barabanki

- Singh received the Helms World Trophy for Asia in 1953 for being the best hockey player in the world and the best sportsman of Asia. This was the first time an Indian was awarded the Helms Trophy.
- In 1958, he was awarded the prestigious Padmashri award by the Government of India.
- The stadiums in Barabanki and Lucknow are named after him. The stadiums at Lucknow and Barabanki, both, are known as the "K. D. Singh Babu Stadium"
- A street in Barabanki city connecting Chhaya Chauraha and Lucknow-Faizabad Road is named after him.

== See also ==
- List of Indian hockey captains in Olympics
- Field hockey in India
