= Suroth =

Suroth Surauth
- Tehsil
- Location in Rajasthan, India
- Coordinates: 26.80984°N 77.14696°E
- Country: India
- State: Rajasthan
- District: Karauli
- Subdistrict: Hindaun Subdistrict

Area
  - Total: 8 km^{2} (3.1 sq mi)
- Elevation: 235 m (771 ft)

Population (2011)
  - Total: 20,000
- Area code: 322252
- Vehicle registration: RJ 34
- Sex ratsioratio: 1000:877 ♂/♀
- Lok Sabha constituency: Karauli–Dholpur
- Vidhan Sabha constituency: Hindaun

Suroth is a tehsil in Hindaun Block, Karauli District, Rajasthan.

== Geography ==
The latitude 26.808974 and longitude 77.1469666 are the geocoordinate of the Suroth. Jaipur is located around 134.2 kilometer away from Suroth.

== Nearby towns/cities ==
Suroth‘s nearest town/city/important place is Hindaun City located at the distance of 13.5 kilometer. Surrounding town/city/TP/CT from Suroth are as follows.Hindaun13.5 km.Bayana18.5 km.Bhusawar26.9 km.Mahwa34.3 km.

== Nearby villages ==
Taharpur 3.1 km, Bhukrawali 3.6 km, Somala Ratra 3.8 km, Bai Jatt 4.1 km, Dhindora 5.4 km, Sherpur 6.2 km, Kheri Hewat 7.3 km, Chinayata 8.8 km, Lahchora 9.3 km, Vanki 11.1 km, Bajna Kalan 11.2 km, Rawai 11.8 km, Mahu Ibrahimpur 12.1 km, Karsoli 12.4 km, Kherli Goojar 12.8 km, Kyarda Khurd 14.2 km, Ghonsla 14.4 km, Mahu Khas 14.5 km, Khareta 14.6 km, Hindaun 14.8 km, Mandawara 17.6 km, Jhareda 18.2 km, Sikroda Meena 18.6 km, Phulwara 18.9 km, Bhango 19.8 km, Kachroli 20.9 km, Bargawan 21.2 km, Irniya 22.2 km, Nagla Meena 22.9 km, Hukmi Khera 23.0 km, Pataunda 23.5 km, Gunsar 23.6 km, Danalpur 24.5 km, Todoopura 25.0 km, Sanet 25.2 km, Katkar 25.7 km, Kotri 25.8 km, Gaonri 26.4 km, Gaoda Meena 26.9 km, Norangabad 27.8 km, Palanpur 28.0 km, Chandangaon 28.2 km, Dahra, Alipura, Mothiyapura, Bajheda, Jagar. (kanchanpura suroth se 2.5 km)

== Transportation ==
=== Railways ===
The nearest railway station to Suroth is Fateh Singhpura which is located in and around 1.2 kilometer distance. Hindaun City railway station 12.9 km. sawai madhopur railway station 121 km.

=== Airways ===
Suroth‘s nearest airport is Jaipur International Airport133.1 km.

== Education ==
This village is booned with higher secondary school recognised by state government.
