= Hindaun Block =

- Subdistrict/Tehsil/Taluka
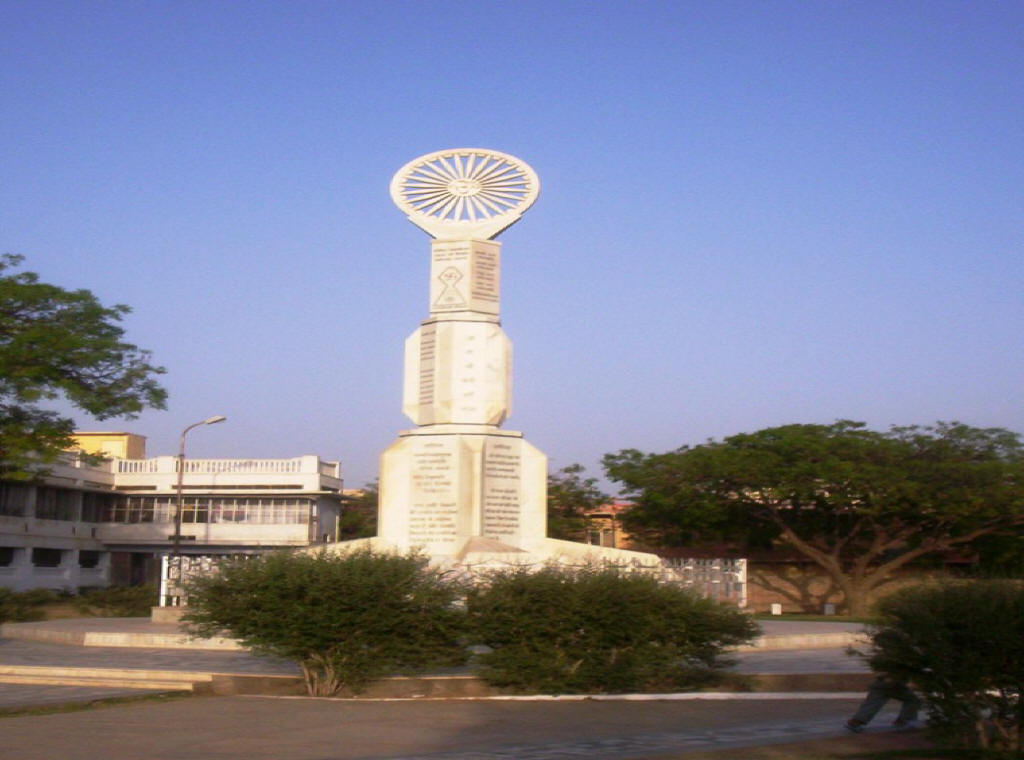

- Location in Rajasthan, India Hindaun Block (India)
- Coordinates: 26.72°N 77.02°E
- Country: India
- State: Rajasthan
- Division: Bharatpur Division
- District: Karauli
- HQ: Hindaun City
- Largest city: Hindaun City
- Founder: Hiranya Kashyap
- Named for: Hiranya Kashyap
- Major villages: List: Suroth, Shri Mahaveer Ji, Mahu Ibrahimpur, Katkad village, Todoopura, Kheda, Akbarpur, Dhindhora, Kheri Haivat, Sherpur

Government
  - Type: Damocratic
  - SDM: Naik Ram Nagarr
  - Tehsildar: Gyan Chandra Jaiman
  - Lok Sabha constituency: Karauli-Dholpur (Lok Sabha constituency)
  - MP: Bhajan Lal Jatav
  - Assembly constituency: Hindaun (Rajasthan Assembly constituency)

Area
  - Subdistrict/Tehsil/Taluka: 698 km^{2} (269 sq mi)
  - Urban: 49 km^{2} (19 sq mi)
  - Rank: 1 in Karauli District
- Elevation: 235 m (771 ft)

Population (2011)
  - Subdistrict/Tehsil/Taluka: 442,369
  - Rank: 1 in Karauli District
  - Density: 634/km^{2} (1,640/sq mi)
  - Urban: 150,000

Languages
  - Official: Hindi, English, Rajasthani
- Time zone: UTC+5:30 (IST)
- PIN: 322230 ,322220, 322232, 322234, 322236, 322240, 322252, 322254
- Telephone code: 91-7469
- Vehicle registration: RJ 34
- Sex ratio: 1000:889 ♂/♀
- Website: http://hindaunonline.in

Hindaun is a block in Karauli district of the Indian state of Rajasthan in Northern India. It is a subdivisional headquarter. Its population is approximately 442,000. The block covers an area of 700 Square kilometres, which makes it the biggest block in Karauli. The subdistrict code of Hindaun is 00522. There are about 165 villages in Hindaun Block.

== Geography and location ==
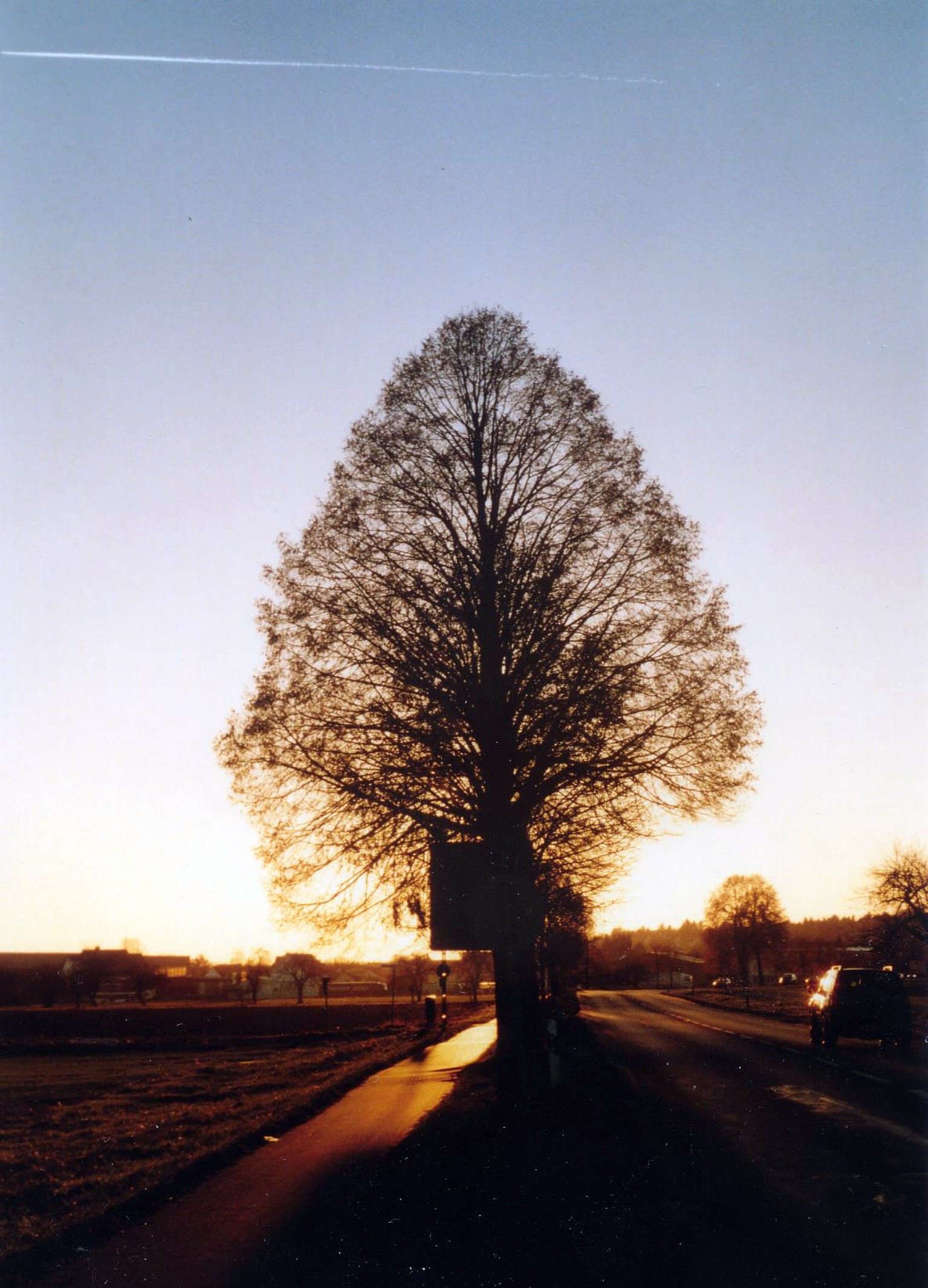
Sunset in Hindaun

Hindaun Block is located on the eastern part of Rajasthan between the Aravalli Range & Vindhya Range. The subdistrict of Hindaun encompasses an area of 690 km^{2}. It is bordered by Manshalpur to the east; by Bayana, Bharatpur District to the north-east; by Mahwa Subdistrict, to the north;by Todabhim Tahsil to west; by Karauli Subdistrict to south; and by Gangapur Subdistrict, Sawai Madhopur District to the South-west.

Good grade stone, slate and some iron ore comprise the mineral resources of the area.

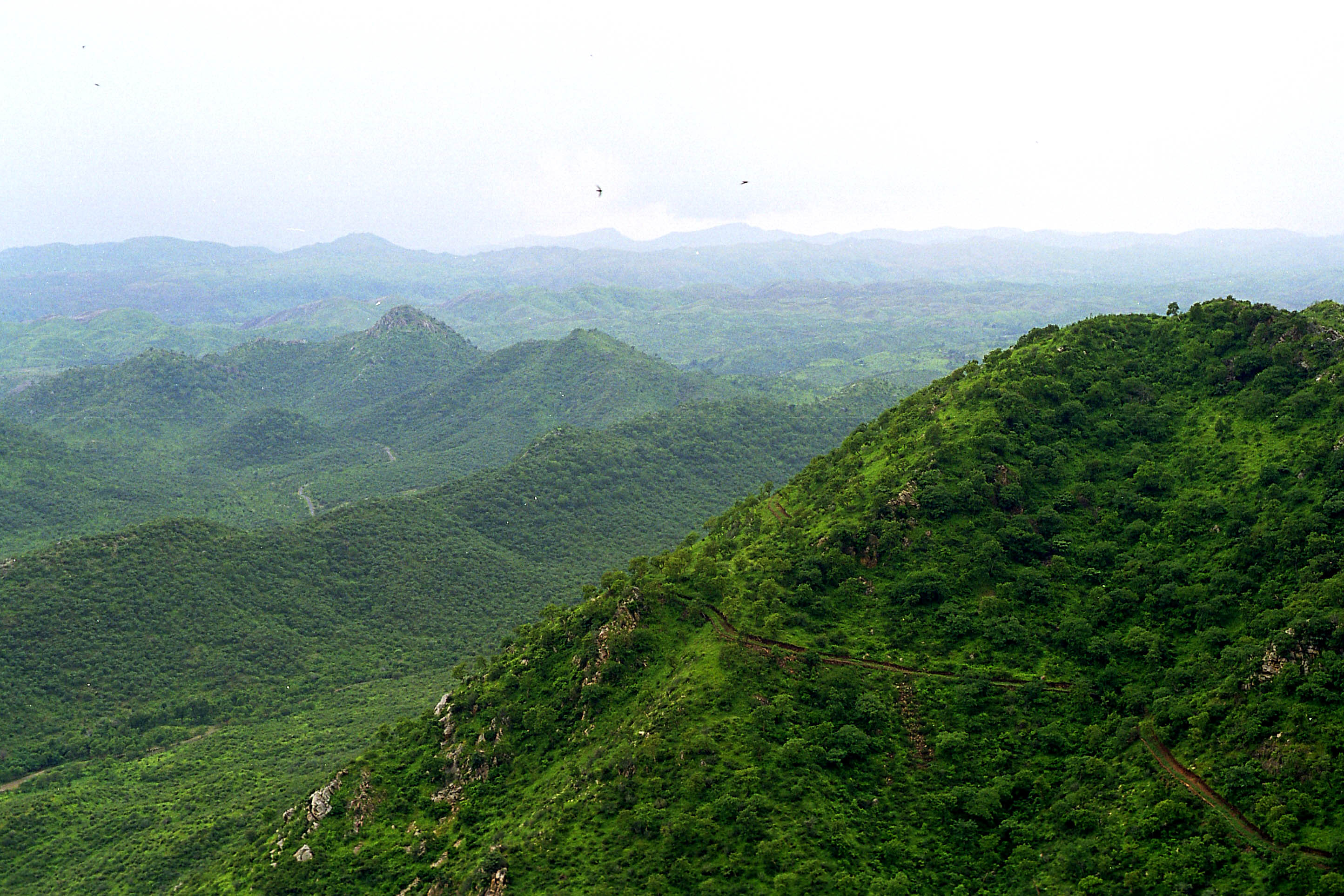
Aravalli Range

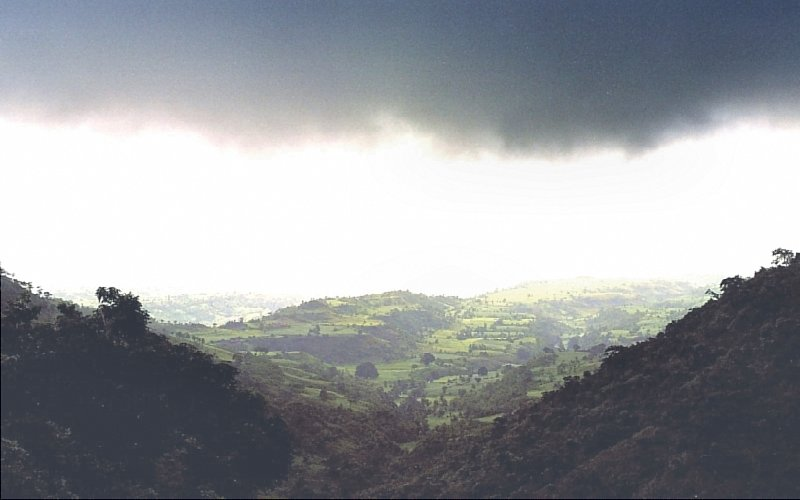
Vindhya Range

== History ==
=== Hindaun in the Bhagavata Purana ===
In the ancient times, the city was under rule by the Matsya Kingdom, which was ruled by Meenas. A large population of Meenas can be seen in nearby villages. There are many ancient structures still present in the town built during the rule of the Matsya Kingdom. Traditionally, in some mythological stories the city is believed to be associated with the mythology of Hiranyakashipu and Prahlada mentioned in Bhagavata Purana.

Local tradition tells us that Hindaun (Hindon) was the capital of Hiranyakashipu, father of Prahlada. Because of this, the area is known as Hiranakus Ki Kher. Kher in Hindi means "capital". This is further confirmed by the existence of monuments like Hiranakus Ka Mandir, Prahlada Kund, Nrisinha Temple, Hiranakus Ka Kua, and Dhobi Pachhad. About 40 years back there was a sculptor of Hiranakus in Hiranakus Ka Mandir. It has been replaced by Rama the temple has become famous as Raghunath Mandir. Hiranakus Ka Kua is situated in the heart of the city and the ruins nearby are part of the Bharon temple. Langda Bharon (Langur) is very popular in the Karauli area. Dhobi Pachhad is believed to be the spot where Prahlada was thrown out of the Palace. There is also a place called Holika Dah where Holika tried to burn Prahlada but she herself was destroyed in the fire.

Hindaun is named after the ancient king Hiranyakashipu, father of Prahlada. The temple to Narasimha, an Avatar of Hindu God Vishnu who killed Hiranyakashipu, which demonstrates the city's connection to the mythology surrounding Hiranyakashipu and Prahlada.

=== Hindaun and the Mahabharata ===
Hindaun is also associated with the era of Mahabharata. It is believed that the name of the city is derived from ‘Hidimba’, sister of Hidimb, a demon. The Kauravas had tried to kill the Pandava when they were staying in the Lakshyagriha, but the Pandavas managed to escape. They went into the then Matasya Kingdom, currently known as Alwar region. Bheema, one of the Pandava Brothers, met Hidimba when he was wandering in the Hiranya Karan Van forest. Hidimba fell in love with Bheema and wanted to marry him. Hidimba's brother Hidimb, a demon fought with Bheema, but he was killed by Bheema. Bheema and Hidimba soon got married and had a son named Ghatotkacha, who was a great warrior and died during the war of Mahabharata.

== Demographices ==
Religions in Hindaun Block
Hinduism	91.6%
Islam	7.5%
others	1%
Distribution of religions

The total population in Hindaun sub district is 440,369 as per the 2011 census. Of this, about 130,452 people are living in urban areas, and about 293,422 are living in villages. There are 74,457 households in this subdistrict. There are 227,403 males (54%); There are 196,471 females (46%). Furthermore, the number of children below 6 years of age is 69,636, of which 37,842 are males and 31,794 are females. Hindaun Scheduled cast and Tribes Total Scheduled Cast are 132,928. The population of the Total Scheduled Tribe is 49,187. 247,941 of the population is literate, of which males are 161,801 and females are 86,140. There are 175,933 Illiterates. The Hindaun Workers' population is 173,256, of which 106,728 are males and 66,528 are females. There are 250,618 Non Workers.

== Climate ==
- There is a wet climate in summer, with a rainy season in winter.

Climate data for Hindaun Tehsil
Month	Jan	Feb	Mar	Apr	May	Jun	Jul	Aug	Sep	Oct	Nov	Dec	Year
Mean daily maximum °C (°F)	20 (68)	25 (77)	34 (93)	38 (100)	44 (111)	42 (108)	39 (102)	37 (99)	36 (97)	34 (93)	29 (84)	25 (77)	34 (92)
Mean daily minimum °C (°F)	8 (46)	12 (54)	18 (64)	23 (73)	27 (81)	29 (84)	27 (81)	26 (79)	25 (77)	20 (68)	15 (59)	10 (50)	20 (68)
Average precipitation cm (inches)	0.35 (0.14)	0.27 (0.11)	0.32 (0.13)	0.35 (0.14)	0.9 (0.4)	3.26 (1.28)	8.89 (3.50)	6.44 (2.54)	3.42 (1.35)	0.45 (0.18)	0.10 (0.04)	0.08 (0.03)	24.83 (9.84)
Source: Foreca

- Highest temperature = 44.0 °C (May–June)
- Lowest temperature = 8.0 °C (December–January)
- Average rainfall = 950 mm
- Monsoon = June to October
- Humidity = 10–20% (summer), 78% (rainy)
- Visit season = March–September

== Shopping in Hindaun ==
Some of Hindaun's shopping experiences are found in city's old bazaars. These are in the walled city, around the main blocks called the Damproad Market . Goods include the traditional Lac Bangles, colourful clothes, mojris and other typical Rajasthani handicrafts.

== Cities and towns in Hindaun Tahsil ==
- Hindaun City
- Shri Mahaveerji Town
- Suroth Town
- Mahoo Town

== Villages in Hindaun Tehsil ==
Akbarpur, Alawara, Alipura, Areni Goojar, Atkoli, Bahadurpur, Banwaripur, Bargawan, Barh Ponchhri, Bhango, Bhukrawali, Binega, Chak Sikandarpur, Chandangaon, Chandeela, Chinayata, Churali, Danalpur, Dedroli, Dhahara, Dhandhawali, Dhindora, Dhursi, Dubbi, Dughati, Ekolasi, Fazalabad, Gaoda Goojar, Gaoda Meena, Gaonri, Garhi Badhawa, Garhi Mosamabad, Garhi Panweda, Ghonsla, Gopipur, Gunsar, Gurhapol, Hadoli, Hindaun (M), Hingot, Hukmi Khera, Irniya, Jagar, Jahanabad, Jamalpur, Jat Nagala, Jatwara, Jewarwadaatak, Jhareda, Jhirna, Kachrauli, Kailash Nagar, Kajanipur, Kalakhana, Kalwar Meena, Kalwari Jatt, Kalyanpur Sayta, Kandroli, Karai, Karsoli, Katkar, Khanwara, Khareta, Khera, Kheri Chandla, Kheri Ghatam, Kheri Hewat, Kheri Sheesh, Kherli Goojar, Khijoori, Khohara Ghuseti, Kodiya, Kotra Dhahar, Kotri, Kutakpur, Kyarda Kalan, Kyarda Khurd, Lahchora, Leeloti, Mahoo Dalalpur, Mahu Ibrahimpur, Mahoo Khas, Mandawara, Manema, Mothiyapur, Mukandpura, Nagal Durgasi, Nagla Meena, Norangabad, Palanpur, Pali, Pataunda, Patti Narayanpur, Peepalhera, Phulwara, Ponchhri, Rara Shahpur, Reejwas, Reethauli, Rewai, Sanet, Sherpur, Shyampur Moondri, Sikandarpur, Sikroda Jatt, Sikroda Meena, Singhan Jatt, Singhan Meena, Sitapur, Somala Ratra, Somli, Suroth, Taharpur, Todoopura, Vajheda, Vajna Kalan, Vajna Khurd, Vanki, Ver Khera, Vijaypura, Wai Jatt,

== Tourist attractions ==
Hindaun has been mentioned in the Puranans and it has had association with the Pandavas. Hindaun is also an important pilgrimage place for the believers of Jainism. Hindaun is famous for fairs like the Mahaveerji Fair, Kaila Devi Fair and many other Hindu Festivals. The Shri Mahavirji Temple is a major pilgrimage center in Jainism, and Mehandipur Balaji Temple, Narsinghji Temple, Kaila Devi Temple, Madan Mohan are temples. The temples of goddess Chamunda at Chinayata and Sankarghanta are in the Eastern part of the city. It also has the Nakkash Ki Devi - Gomti Dham, with sacred ponds adjacent to the temple termed as Jalsen Reservoirs. There are Arawli hills known as Tele Ki Panseri (Jalsen Hills), and a catchment area 6 miles away from Hindaun city. Radha-Raman, Shri Hardev ji temples, Teeka Kund Hanumanji temple, Chintaharan Hanumanji-Sai Baba temple, Radha Vallabh Ji Temple', Pandey Mohalla, and the Bhaylapura and Kyarda Hanumanji Temple are also located within the city.

Hindaun Being a place associated with the ancient era of India, Hindaun has many places of historic significance. Hindaun, a city located in the eastern fringes of Rajasthan State, is getting developed into an important tourist destination for its age old architecture and association of these monuments with various phases of Indian culture and history.

Shri Mahavir Ji Temple

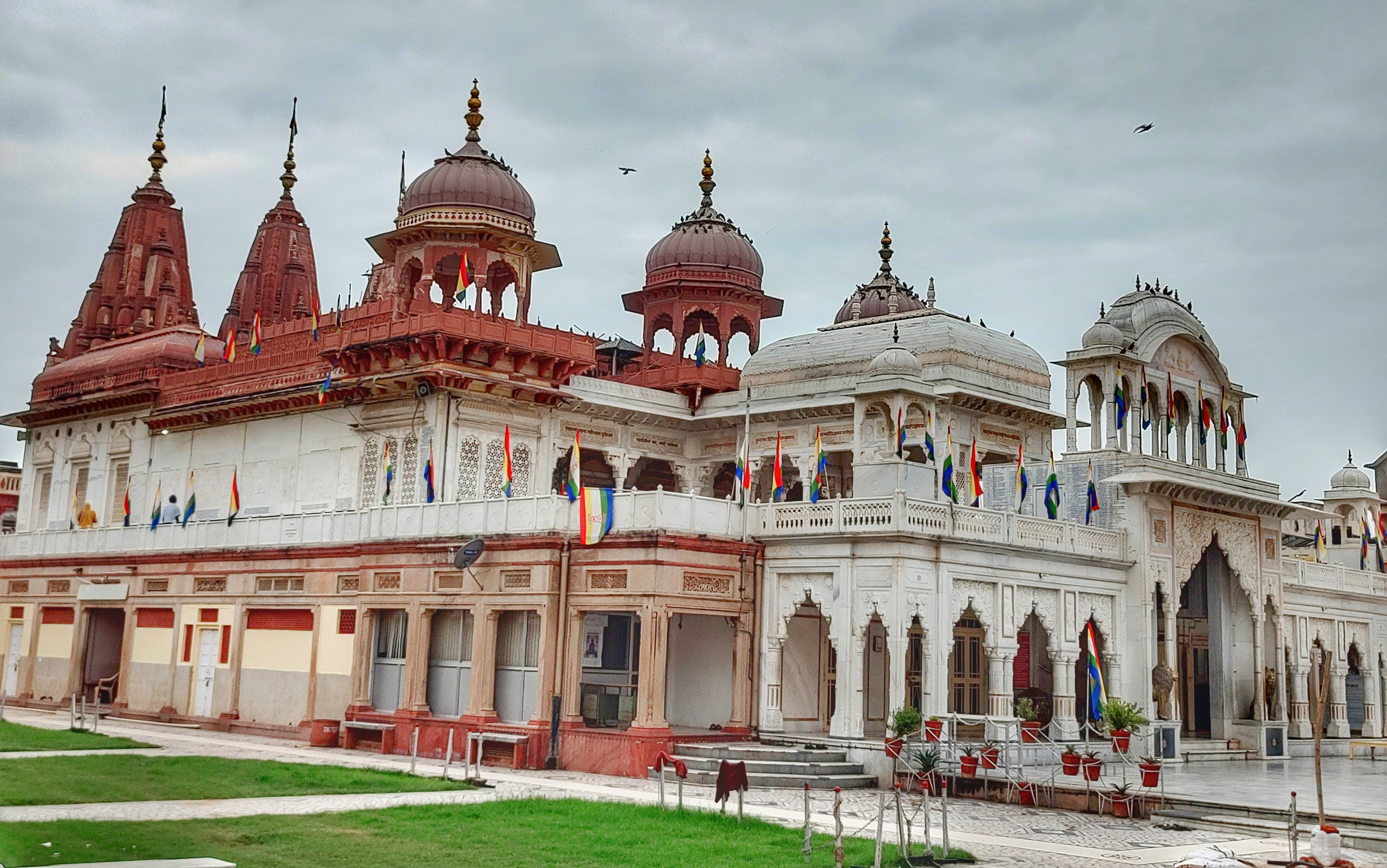
Shri Mahavir Ji Temple

This place was previously known as Chandanpur but was renamed Shri Mahaveer Ji when the idol of Mahavira was excavated over 200 years ago from the same spot, after which the temple was constructed. Thousands of worshipers come from across India to see this famous statue. There are five temples in Shri Mahavirji Digambar. Jain Atishaya Kshetra Shri Mahavirji, Shantinath Jinalaya, Bhagwan Parshvanath Jinalaya, Kirti Ashram Chaityalaya and Bhavya Kamal Mandir.

Nakkash Ki Devi - Gomti Dham

Nakkash Ki Devi - Gomti Dham Temple is in Hindaun City, and is located in the Karauli district in Rajasthan, India. Nakkash Ki Devi is a Hindu Devi Temple of Durga and Gomti Dham is a temple and vatika (ashram) of Gomti Dass Ji Maharaj.

Kaila Devi Temple

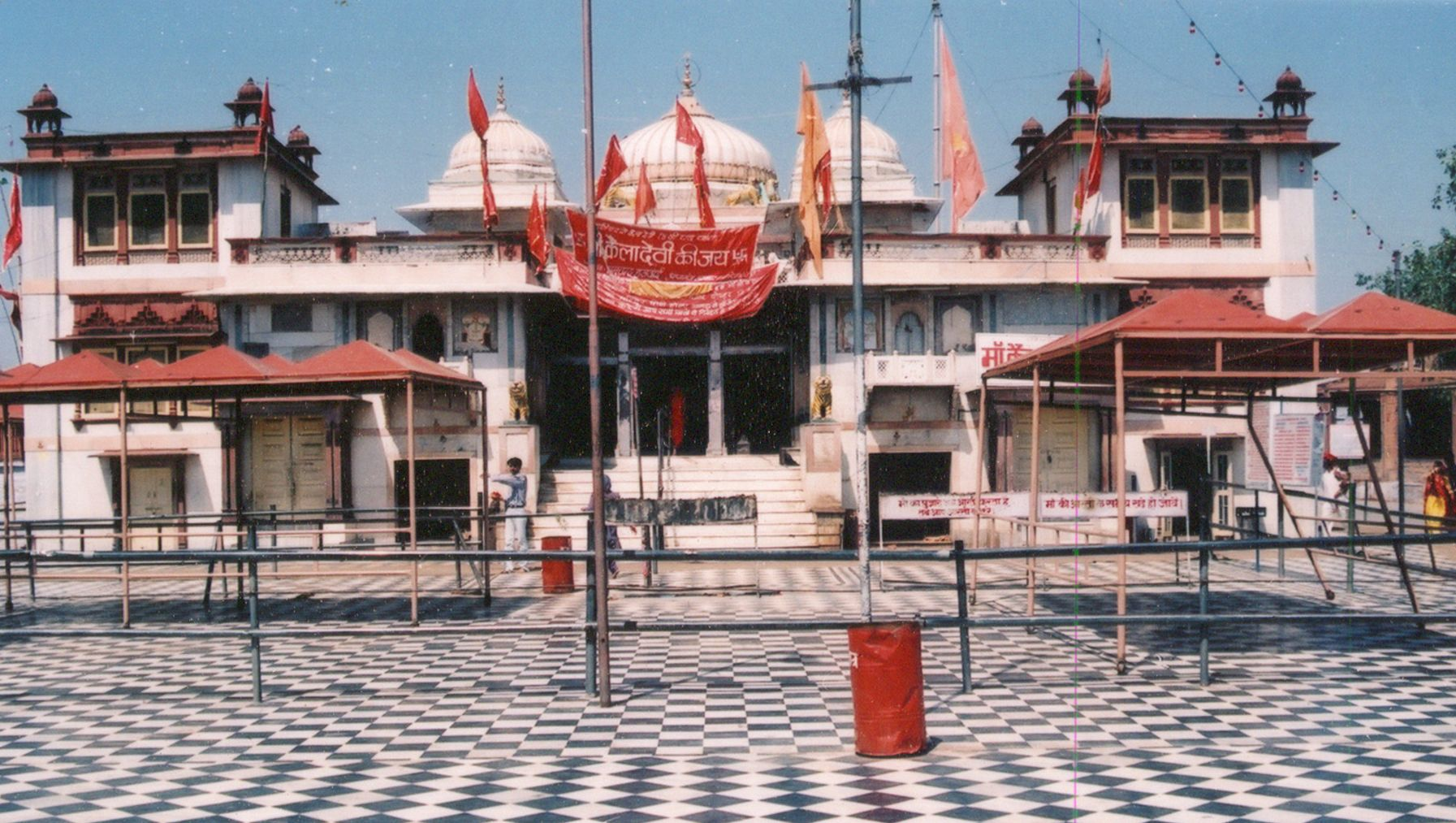
Kailadevi temple

Kaila Devi Temple is a Hindu temple situated 53 km from Hindaun City in the Rajasthan state in India. The temple is located on the banks of the Kalisil river, a tributary of the Banas River in the hills of Trikut, 2 km to the north-west of Kaila village. The temple is dedicated to the tutelary deity, goddess Kaila Devi, of the erstwhile princely Jadaun Rajput rulers of the Karauli state. It is a marble structure with a large courtyard with a checkered floor. In one place are a number of red flags planted by devotees.

Madan Mohan Temple

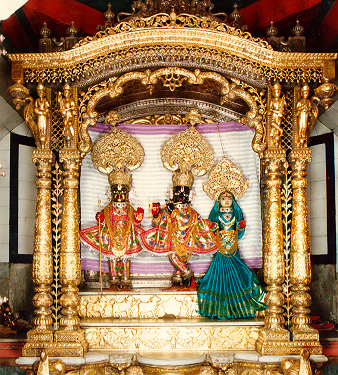
Madan Mohanji

Madan Mohan is a form of the Hindu god, Krishna. Krishna is celebrated as Madan Mohan. His consort, Radha, is glorified as Madan Mohan's Mohini, the mesmeriser of the mesmeriser for spiritual aspirants. Radha is known as the mediator without whom, access to Krishna is not possible. Originally from Shri Vrindavan, Madan Mohan ji went to Amer in Jaipur with Raja Sawai Jai Singh II - the founder of Jaipur and from there was brought to Karauli in Rajasthan by Maharaj Gopal Singh after he conquered the battle of Daulatabad.

Mehandipur Balaji Temple

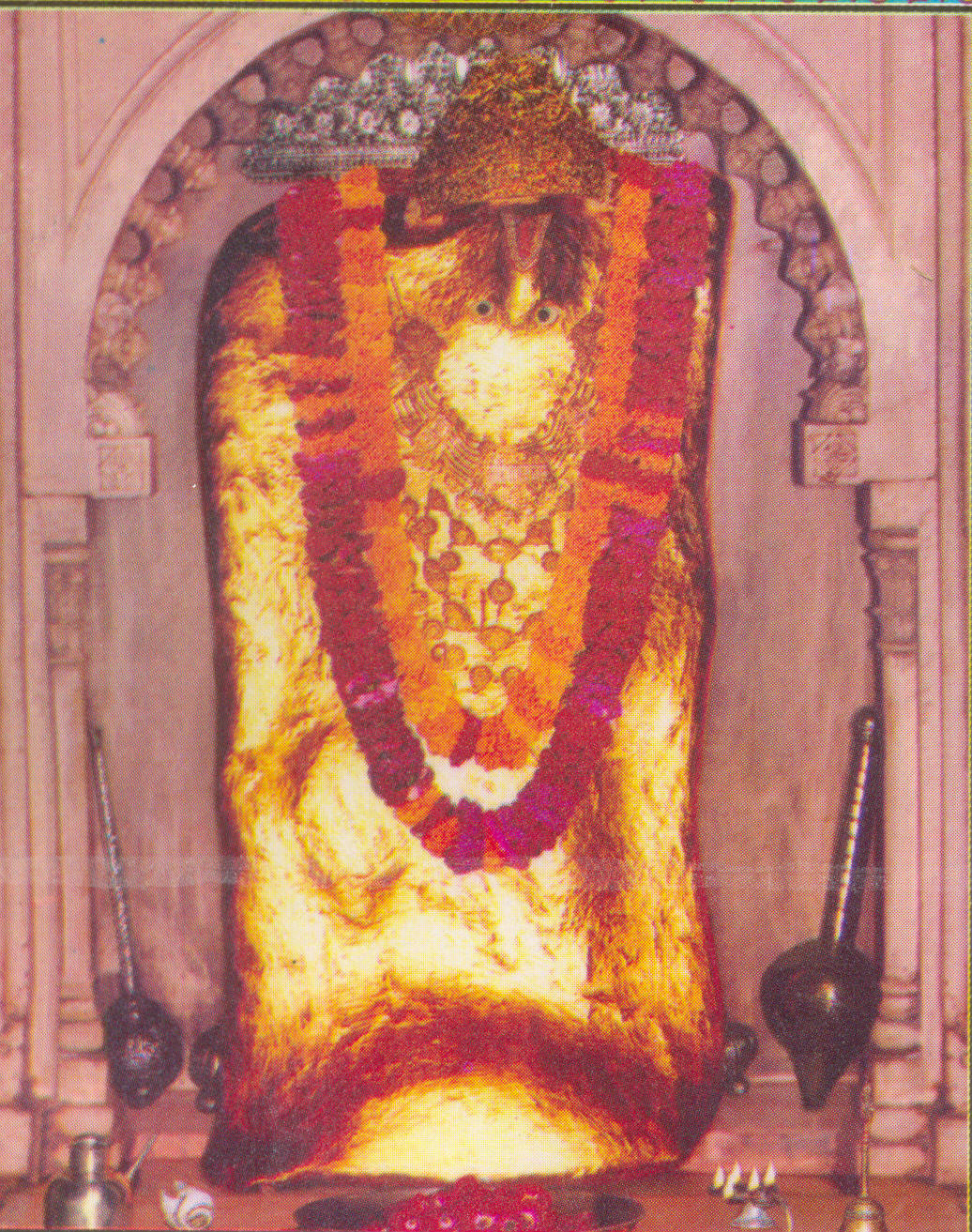
Mahendipur Balaji

Mandir is a mandir in the Indian state of Rajasthan dedicated to the Hindu God Hanuman. The name Balaji is applied to Sri Hanuman in several parts of India because the childhood (Bala in Hindi or Sanskrit) form of the Lord is celebrated there. The temple is not dedicated to Balaj, another name for Krishna. Unlike similar religious sites it is located in a town rather than the countryside. Its reputation for ritualistic healing and exorcism of evil spirits attracts many pilgrims from Rajasthan and elsewhere.

Lord Narsinghji Temple

Hindaun City is associated with the demon King Hiranyakashyap, father of Lord Vishnu's devotee, Prahlad. Lord Narsingha is an incarnation of Lord Vishnu who had killed Hiranyakashyap to save his son Prahlad, a true devotee of Lord Vishnu. Lord Narsinghji Temple is built in the memory of Lord Vishnu's incarnation and it attracts a large number of tourists each year for its historical and religious significance.

Timan Garh Fort

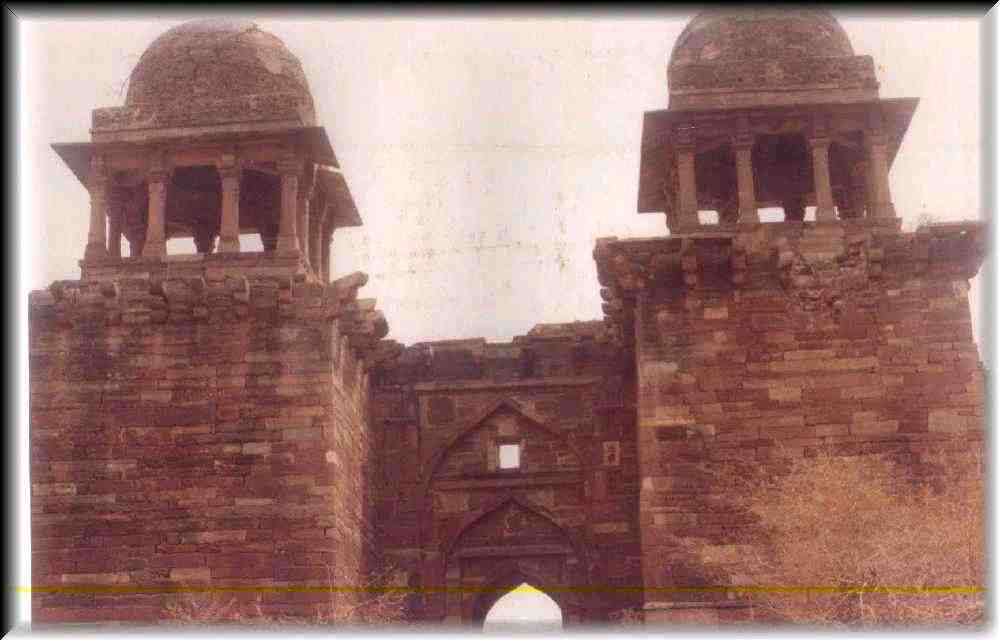
Timan Garh Fort

Timan Garh is a historical fort situated near Hindaun Block in the Karauli District in the Indian state of Rajasthan.

=== Historical places ===
- Jachcha Ki Baori, Hindaun City
- Jalsen Reservoir, Hindaun City
- Garhmora
- Padampura Fort
- Timan Garh
- Suroth Fort
- Hargovind Ji ki Baori, Hindaun City
- Prahlada Kund, Hindaun City
- Matiya Mahal
- Shri Mahavirji
- Danghati, Hindaun
- Kundeva
- Lord Narsinghji Temple
- Hindaun Fort, Hindaun
- Hiranyakashayap ka kua, Hindaun
- Dhobi Pachhat

The main places of attraction in Hindaun City are: The Prahlada Kund, Hiranyakashayap ka kua & palace and The Jagar Dam, Kundeva, Danghati, the fort of Suroth, City of Moradwaja, the castle of Padampura, the Timan Garh & the well of Nand-Bhaujai are some popular attractions.

=== Hill station in Hindaun ===
The hills are a public place, surrounded by the Aravali hills. There is a popular hill station in the Aravalli Range Jalsen Hills, a collection of multiple peaks in Krauli district of Rajasthan state in western India. The highest peak on the mountain is 1400 m above sea level. It is referred to as "an oasis in the desert" as its heights are home to rivers, lakes, waterfalls and evergreen forests.

Jagar Dam, Hindaun

It is one of the single places in the city where you can enjoy the Jaggar Dam, land sliding, hill climbing, and a view of high hills and ponds. The nearest major railway station is Hindaun City railway station 15 km away.

=== Culture ===
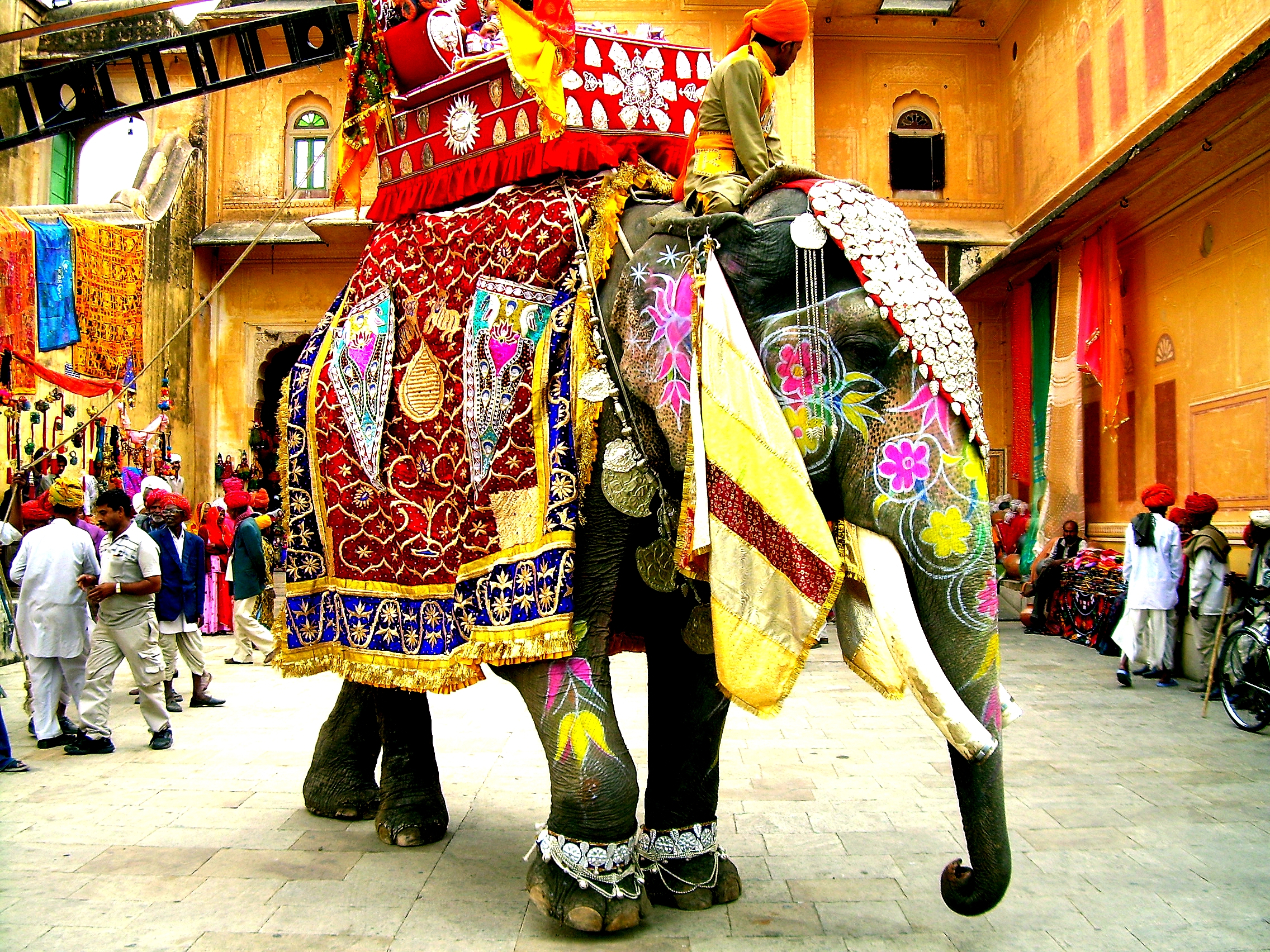
A decorated Indian elephant during a fair in Hindaun

The main religious festivals are Deepawali, Holi, Gangaur, Teej, Raksha Bandhan, Makar Sankranti and Janmashtami, as the main religion is Hinduism. Rajasthan's desert festival is celebrated with great zest and zeal. This festival is held once a year during the winter. Dressed in hued costumes, the people of the desert dance and sing haunting ballads of valor, romance and tragedy. There are fairs with snake charmers, puppeteers, acrobats and folk performers. Camels play a great role in this festival.

=== Ranthambore National Park ===
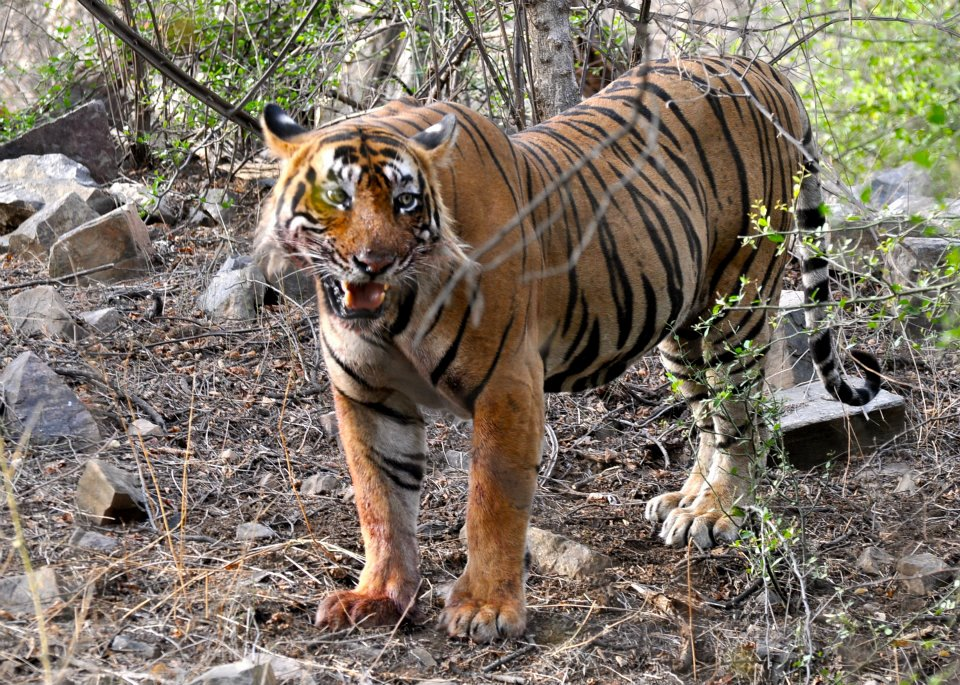
T24- The largest tiger in Ranthambore National park

Ranthambore National Park is one of the largest national parks in India. It is situated around 123 kilometers from Hindaun City. It was established as the Sawai Madhopur Game Sanctuary in 1955 by the Government of India, and was declared one of the Project Tiger reserves in 1973. Ranthambore became a national park in 1980. In 1984, the adjacent forests were declared the Sawai Man Singh Sanctuary and Keladevi Sanctuary, and in 1991 the tiger reserve was enlarged to include Sawai Man Singh and Keladevi sanctuaries.

=== Keoladeo National Park, Bharatpur ===
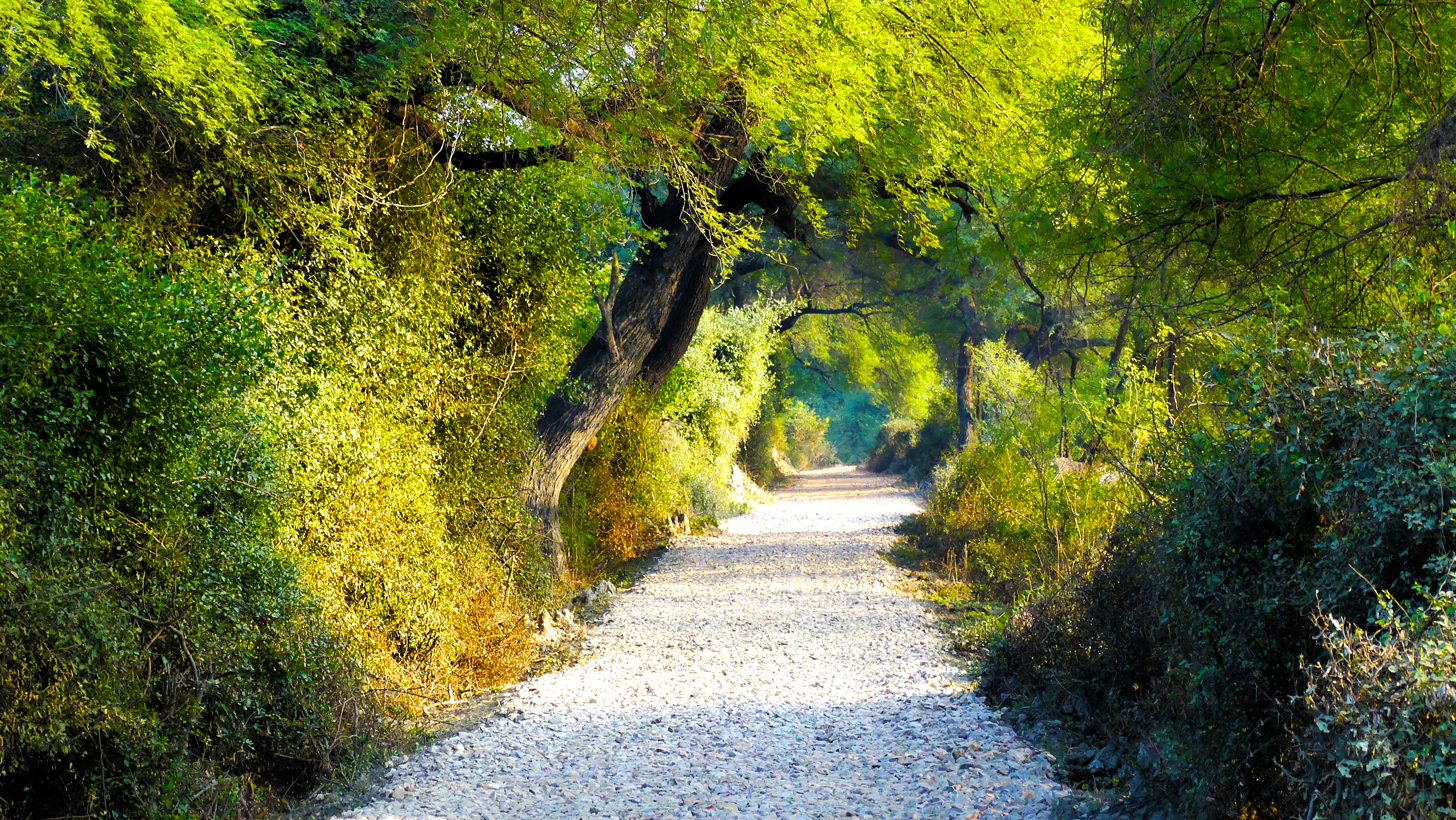
A view inside Keoladeo National Park

Being a UNESCO World Heritage Site, the duck-hunting reserve of the Maharajas is one of the most major wintering areas for large numbers of aquatic birds from Afghanistan, Turkmenistan, China and Siberia. Some 364 species of birds have been recorded in the park. It is 100 km from Hindaun City. The name "Keoladeo" is derived from the name of an ancient Hindu temple devoted to Lord Shiva. In the sanctuary's central zone, the Hindi term "Ghana" implies dense, thick areas of the forest cover. It is mainly famous for its Siberian crane. It was the only habitat of Siberian crane in the world, other than Siberia. The species has stopped reaching the park. The main reasons for this are being cited as lack of conservation measures in India, diversion of water for farmers instead of saving the wetlands as per then Chief Minister Vasundhara Raje's orders, hunting during migration in Pakistan and the Afghanistan as well as the war against Taliban in Afghanistan.

=== Sariska Tiger Reserve ===
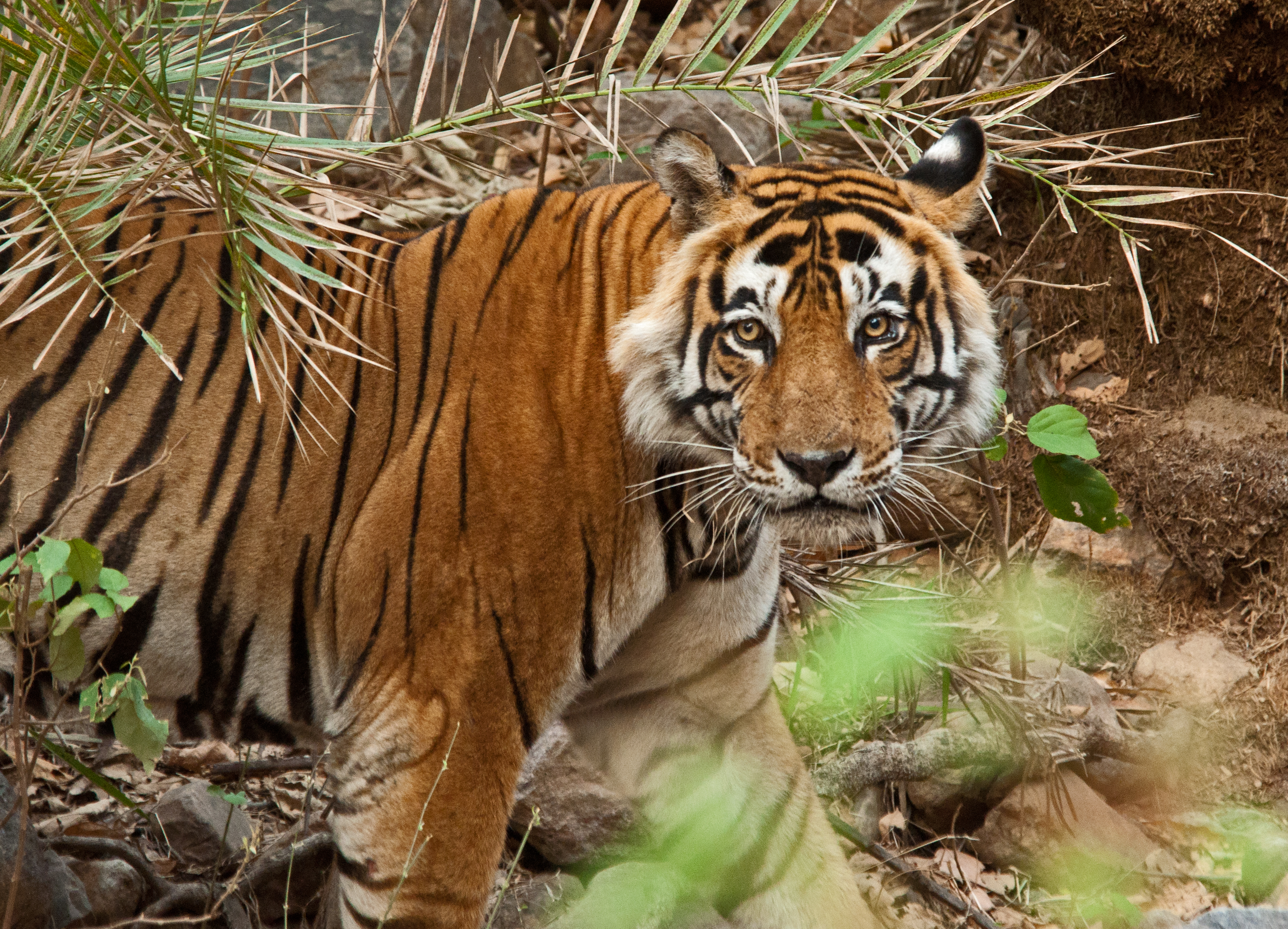
A tiger in Sariska Tiger Reserve

Sariska Tiger Reserve is probably one of the most visited parks in India. Unfortunately though, the main reason for this is not for wildlife enthusiasm, but only its excellent proximity to some large towns like Delhi and Jaipur. The park was, as with many other parks, the hunting reserve of the royal family in the area. In this case, it was the royal family of Alwar Rajasthan. The reserve was declared a wildlife sanctuary in 1958 and came under Project Tiger as Sariska Tiger Reserve in 1979. The park is 800 square kilometers, 480 square kilometers of which form the core area of the national park. It is located among the Aravalli hill ranges in the Alwar district of Rajasthan. It 106 km away from Hindaun City.

== Temples ==
- Shri Mahavirji Temple Hindaun City
- Narsinghji Temple, Gadi Bandhva
- Bajaar Bale Hanumanji Temple, Damp Road Market, Bhayalapura, Hindaun City
- Chinta Haran Hanumanji-Sai Baba-Sive Parivar Temple, Bargama Road, Hindaun City
- Tika Kund Hanumanji Temple, Bayana Road, Hindaun City
- Nakkash Ki Devi - Gomti Dham, Hindaun City
- Shri Radha Raman Ji Temple, Neem Ka bajaar, Hindaun City
- Shri Hardevji Maharaj Temple, Neem Ka Bajaar, Hindaun City
- Raghunath Ji Templ', Old Hindaun, Hindaun City
- Radha Ballabh Ji Temple, Pandey Mohalla, Bayalapura, Hindaun City
- Kyarda Hanumanji Temple, Hindaun City
- Sheetla Mata Temple, Sheetla Chauraha

=== Temples around of Hindaun ===
- Kaila Devi Temple, Kailadevi
- Mehandipur Balaji Temple, Todabhim
- Madan Mohan Temple, Karauli
- Ranthambhaor Ganeshji Temple, Sawai Madhopur

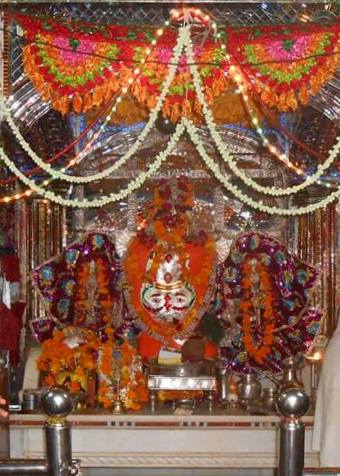
Trinaitra Ganesh, Ranthambore Fort, Sawai Madhopur

== Industries ==
The city is known for its red stone and sandstone, which gives the city global acclaim. It is the largest market for sandstone in the subcontinent. The stone industries have blossomed here. The Red Fort, Akshardham Temple of Delhi, Agra, and The Swami Narain temple in Jaipur were built with this Red stone.

The iron industry is throughout Hindaun. It has a good rank in Rajasthan. The slate industry is also well rooted here and is in a very high rank in the state. Slates are exported abroad, too. Various minor scale industries e.g.candles, battis, and wooden toys also exist.

=== Types of stone ===
There is sandstone, red stone, masonry stone, silica sand, soapstone, yellow mint stone, natural sandstone, stone sinks sandstones, mint sandstone, pink sandstone, red sandstone and white sandstone in the city.

== See also ==
- Hindaun (Rajasthan Assembly constituency)
- Hindaun City railway station
- Shri Mahaveerji railway station
- Hindaun City Bus Depot
- Jagar Dam
- Jalsen Reservoir
- Kaila Devi Temple
- Shri Mahavirji
- Narsinghji Temple
- Karauli District
- Educational institutions in Hindaun Subdivision
- Timan Garh
