= Fateh Singhpura railway station =

Railway station in Karauli Rajasthan, India

Fateh Singhpura

General information
- Location: Suroth, Hindaun Karauli, Rajasthan; India
- Coordinates: 26.82°N 77.14°E
- System: Indian Railways station
- Owner: Ministry of Railways, Indian Railways
- Line: Delhi–Mumbai
- Platforms: 02
- Tracks: 04
- Connections: Taxi stand, Auto rickshaw stand

Construction
- Structure type: Standard (on ground station)
- Platform levels: 01
- Parking: NA
- Cycle facilities: Available
- Accessible: Yes

Other information
- Station code: FSP
- Zone(s): West Central railway
- Division(s): Kota
Location
- Location within Rajasthan

Fateh Singhpura is a railway station on the West Central railway network at Suroth, Suroth Tehsil in India. It comes under the Kota railway division of West Central Railway zone Fatehsinghpura is a D-Grade station on the Delhi–Mumbai route. The station code is FSP.

== See also ==
- Hindaun Tehsil
- Hindaun
- Hindaun (Rajasthan Assembly constituency)
- Suroth
- Hindaun City railway station
- Hindaun City bus depot
- Jaggar Dam
- Jalsen Reservoir
- Kaila Devi Temple
- Shri Mahaveer Ji temple
- Narsinghji Temple
- Karauli district
- Educational institutions in Hindaun Subdivision
- Timangarh
