= Hindaun City bus depot =

Hindaun City Bus Depot

General information
- Location: Opposite Bhayalapura, SH-1, SH-22, Hindaun City, Rajasthan. India
- Coordinates: 26.72°N 77.02°E
- System: Bus Station
- Owner: RSRTC
- Operator: RSRTC

Construction
- Structure type: At Grade
- Platform levels: 1st
- Parking: Yes
- Cycle facilities: Yes
Location
- Location within Rajasthan

Hindaun City Bus Depot is a Rajasthan Roadways Bus Depot in Hindaun, Rajasthan, India. It is the central bus stand for the Rajasthan State Road Transport Corporation. Buses are available for Jaipur, Kaila Devi, Gangapur City, Dausa, Sawai Madhopur, Ajmer, Udaipur, Etawah, Bharatpur, Dholpur, Alwar, Tonk, Churu, Jhunjhunu, Bikaner, Delhi, Haryana, Punjab, Uttarakhand, Gujarat, Uttar Pradesh, Madhya Pradesh and various other locations.

== See also ==
- Hindaun City
- Hindaun Block
- Hindaun City railway station
- Jagar Dam
- Jalsen Reservoir
- Kaila Devi Temple
- Shri Mahavirji
- Narsinghji Temple
- Karauli District
- Educational institutions in Hindaun Subdivision
