= Binega =

Binega Ghode ka Binega, vinega
- village
- Location in Rajasthan, India Binega (India)
- Coordinates: 26°30′37″N 76°47′34″E
- Country: India
- State: Rajasthan
- District: Sawai Madhopur

Population (2011)
  - Total: 1,723

Languages
  - Official: Hindi
- Time zone: UTC+5:30 (IST)
- PIN: 322219
- Telephone code: 07463
- ISO 3166 code: RJ-IN
- Vehicle registration: RJ25
- Nearest city: Gangapur City, Hindaun, Wazirpur, Shri Mahavir ji,
- Sex ratio: 834/1000 ♀/♂
- Literacy: 90%
- Lok Sabha constituency: Sawai Madhopur
- Vidhan Sabha constituency: Gangapur City

Binega or Vinega (also known as Ghode ka Binega) is a small village/hamlet located approximately 8 km (5 mi) from Gangapur City in Sawai Madhopur District of Rajasthan, India. It comes under Toksi Panchayath. It belongs to Bharatpur Division . It is located 73 km towards north from district headquarters Sawai Madhopur and 120 km from state capital Jaipur

== History ==
According to a popular story, a girl from Choti Udai married a man from Todabhim and after some years of marriage asked her father to have her own land. Her father told his daughter to walk around the land she wanted to have for herself and thus the area under Binega was given to her. She thought the land amount was appropriate for that time but if we compare it to other villages, a single rich farmer have this much land.

According to this story, the villagers of Todabhim are brothers and the villagers of Choti Udai are cousins in relation to people of Binega

== Demographics ==
According to Indian census, 2011, the demographic details of village is as follows:

- Total Population: 1723 in 287 households
- Male Population: 939 and female population: 784
- Children Under 6-years of age: 246 (boys – 133 and girls – 113)
- Total Literates: 942 (male – 654 and female – 288)
- SC population: 263 (male – 130 and female – 133)
- ST population: 1281 (male – 715 and female – 566)
- Working population: 833 (male – 436 and female – 377)

Although, sex ratio is less and inequality prevails but in recent years the condition of female sex ratio has improved a lot. Priyanka Meena and Preeti Meena are first female engineers with post of JEN in Public Works department and Transmission Department in state government. Prerna Jorwal's Executive engineer is IOCL. One Girls Poonam Jorwal is studying In IIT Delhi.

== Telecommunication ==
Std Code:07463
The village has BTS of major telecommunication companies including that of Jio, BSNL, Airtel, Vodafone, Idea. Land line telephony is also available, though the village still lacks Internet Broadband connectivity. Direct to home, DTH connections in the village are also on rise.

== Climate ==
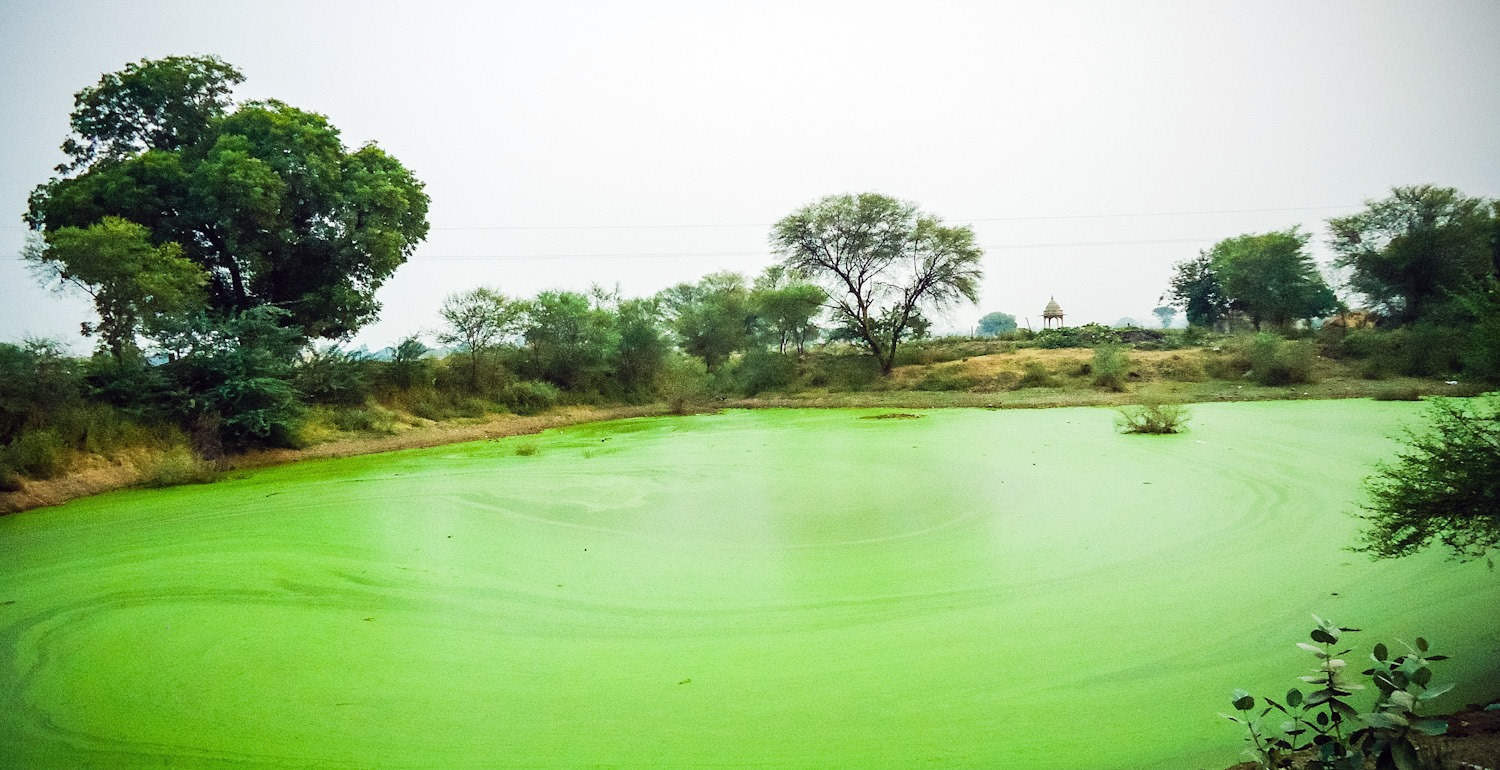
Common Water Body

The temperature in the summer season ranges from 25 °C (77 °F) to 45 °C (113 °F), and in the winter from 5 °C (41 °F) to 23 °C (73 °F).

== Transportation ==
Binega is situated on State Highway 1 (RJ SH 1) which passes from Jhalawar to Mathura via Jhalrapatan, Khandiya Choraha, Baran, Mangrol, Itawah, Laban, Lakheri, Indergarh, Sawai Madhopur, Bhadoti, Gangapur City, Hindaun, Bayana, Bharatpur.

It is accessible by buses on the road from Gangapur City to Hindaun. It can also be reached by Tempo and Jeep from Gangapur City, Hindaun and Wazirpur. It is also reachable from Lalpur Umri RailWay Station, Chhoti Odai RailWay Station and Piloda RailWay Station.
