= Mahu Ibrahimpur =

Mahu Ibrahimpur (Mahu-Ibrahimpur, Khas, Dalalpur)
- Town
- Nickname: Mahoo
- Location in Rajasthan, India Mahu Ibrahimpur (India)
- Coordinates: 26.72°N 77.02°E
- Country: India
- State: Rajasthan
- District: Karauli
- Tehsil: Hindaun Tehsil

Area
  - Total: 8 km^{2} (3.1 sq mi)

Population (2011)
  - Total: 10,000
  - Density: 1,200/km^{2} (3,200/sq mi)

Languages
  - Official: Hindi
- Time zone: UTC+5:30 (IST)
- PIN: 322254
- Telephone code: 91-7469
- Vehicle registration: RJ 34
- Sex ratio: 1000:889 ♂/♀

Mahu Ibrahimpur is a town in Hindaun Block in Karauli district of the Indian state of Rajasthan in Northern India. The town is located in the vicinity of the Aravalli Range. Its population is approximately 10000. The town covers an area of 8 Square kilometres (3.1 sq mi).
