= Jagar, Hindaun =

Jagar
- Gram Panchayat
- Location in India
- Coordinates: 26.79°N 77.13°E
- Country: India
- State: Rajasthan
- District: Karauli District
- Subdistricts: Hindaun Block

Area
  - Total: 7 km^{2} (2.7 sq mi)
- Elevation: 235 m (771 ft)

Population (2011)
  - Total: 9,997
- Area code: 322236
- Vehicle registration: RJ 34
- Sex ratsioratio: 1000:877 ♂/♀
- Lok Sabha constituency: Karauli–Dholpur
- Vidhan Sabha constituency: Hindaun

Jagar is a Gram Panchayat in Hindaun Block, Karauli District, Rajasthan. Approximately 9000 people live there.

== Demographics ==
Inhabitants of Jagar speak Hindi.
