= Katkad village =

Katkad Katkar, Ratanzila
- Village
- Location in Rajasthan, India Katkad (India)
- Coordinates: 26.38°N 76.58°E
- Country: India
- State: Rajasthan
- District: Karauli
- Tehsil: Hindaun Tehsil

Government
  - Type: Panchayati raj (India)
  - Body: Gram panchayat
- Elevation: 235 m (771 ft)

Population (2011)
  - Total: 8,168

Languages
  - Official: Hindi
- Time zone: UTC+5:30 (IST)
- PIN: 322234
- Telephone code: 91-7469
- ISO 3166 code: RJ-IN
- Vehicle registration: RJ 34
- Sex ratio: 815:1000 ♂/♀

Katkad is a village in Hindaun Block in Karauli district in Rajasthan India in the vicinity of the Vindhya Range. Its population is approximately 10,000. It covers an area of 8 square kilometres (3.1 sq mi). Temperatures range from 25 to 45 degrees Celsius in summer and between 5 and 23 degrees Celsius in winter. It has an average elevation of 234 metres (768 ft) and is around 163 km from the state capital, Jaipur.

The village is dominated by the jagarwad Meena caste and considered to be as old as 1200 years. The village also has a small river named Gambhir, a seasonal river that has water only during rainy seasons.

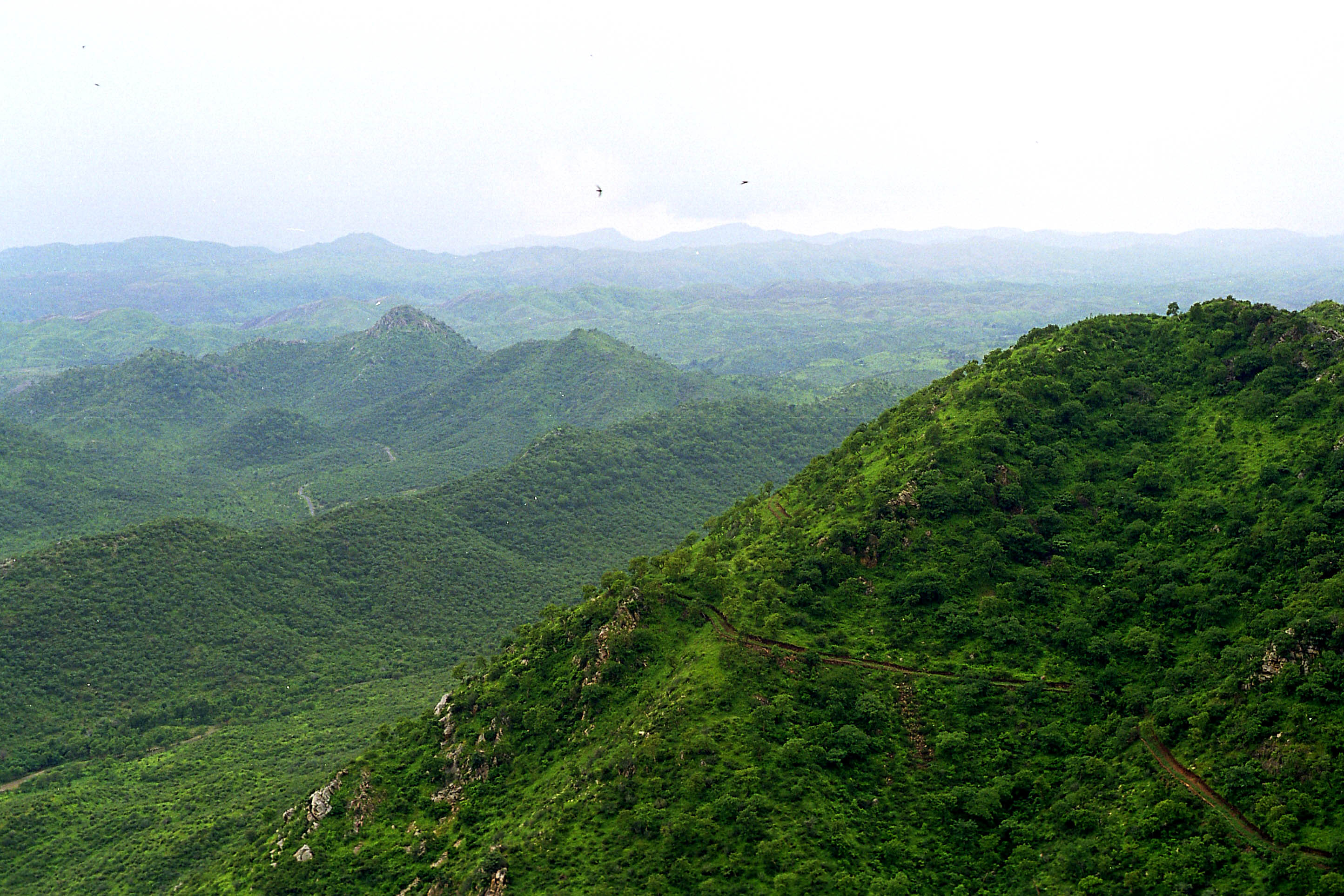
Aravalli Range

And In this village One of famous Temple Trust Shri Balaji Maharaj Katkad Nya Dham katkad(Ghatiyan ka pura)

== History ==
The village has a rich and long history. Earlier, it was dominated by Gurjar people, but in the 15th century Meenas occupied this village with little intervention of the Mughal ruler. The village was earlier located very near to the Gambhir River, but after staying 1000 years at the same place, they moved slightly away from old place as according to local tradition. Earlier, village was known by as Ratanzila due to its rich agriculture products. Up until the 18th century, when it was banned by the British, opium was cultivated in village. The is often called Katkad Medi . Medi is the twin village across the bank of the river

== Temples and fairs ==
Being an old village, it has many temples, such as Hanuman ji ka mandir, Dev baba ka mandir, and Naseer Baba ka Mandir Raghunath (thakur baba) ka Mandir. Many gatherings take place during various occasions like Janmashtmi celebration, kushti dangal at naseer baba ka mandir, and many others.

== Education ==
The village has several educational institutions including Govt. Senior secondary school(Ratanzila), Baba ramphool secondary school, and smarts kids English medium school, among others.
