= Hindaun City railway station =

Railway Station in Rajasthan, India

Hindaun City
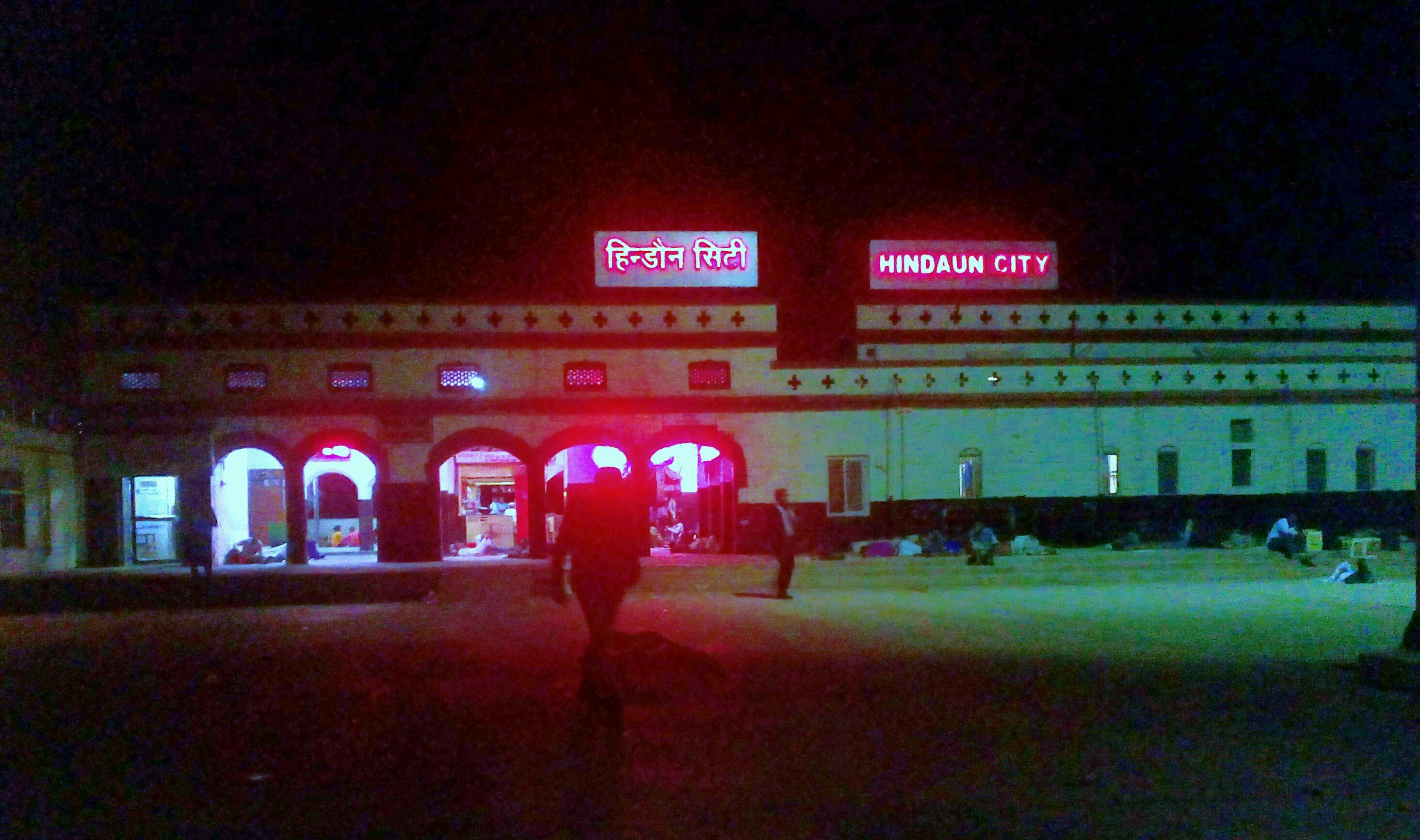

General information
- Location: Near Vajna Kalan, Bazariya, Hindaun City, Rajasthan, India
- Coordinates: 26.7557°N 77.0314°E
- System: Indian Railways station
- Owner: Ministry of Railways, Indian Railways
- Operator: Kota
- Line: New Delhi–Mumbai main line
- Platforms: 02
- Tracks: 04
- Connections: Taxi stand, auto rickshaw stand

Construction
- Structure type: Standard (on ground station)
- Parking: Yes Available
- Accessible: Available

Other information
- Status: Functioning
- Station code: HAN
- Zone(s): WCR
- Division(s): Kota

History
- Opened: 1909

Passengers
- 10000+

Services
52 trains
Location
- Location within Rajasthan Location within India

Hindaun City railway station is a railway station serving Hindaun City in the state of Rajasthan, India. The station code is HAN. It comes under the Kota railway division of West Central Railway zone. Hindaun City is a B-Grade station on the Delhi–Mumbai route.

It is located in the Karauli district of Rajasthan State. The station code is HAN and it belongs to Kota Division. Railway stations near Hindaun railway station are Shri Mahabirji and Bayana Jn. Sawai Madhopur is the other railway station near Hindaun.

In 2018, a mob set fire to a part of the station during a protest by the dalits.

== Trains ==
From Hindaun City there are trains to New Delhi, Mumbai, Lucknow, Kanpur, Jammutawi, Amritsar, Ludhiana, Jalandhar, Haridwar, Dehradun, Jaipur, Chandigarh, Kalka and Shri Mata Vaishno Devi Katra. In March 2024, a stop at Tura station in Uttar Pradesh was announced on the Patna-Kota-Patna Express.

Superfast trains

- 12926/12925 Amritsar–Mumbai Paschim Express – daily
- 12059/60 Kota Jan Shatabdi Express
- 12903/04 Golden Temple Mail
- 12963/64 Mewar Express

Mail Express

- 19024/19023 Firozpur Janata Express – daily
- 19019/19020 Bandra Terminus–Dehradun Express – daily
- 13237/38/39/40 Patna–Kota Express
- 19805/06 Kota–Udhampur Express
- 19803/04 Kota–Vaishno Devi Katra Express

Passenger

- 59355/56 Ratlam—Mathura passenger – daily
- 59812/11 Ratlam–Agra Fort Haldighati – passenger
- 59814/13 Kota–Agra Fort – passenger
- 59806/05 Jaipur–Bayana – fast passenger
- 54794/93 Sawai Madhopur–Mathura – passenger

== Stations serving Hindaun block region ==
Station name	Station code	Railway zone	Total platforms
Hindaun City railway station (Hindaun City)	HAN	West Central Railways	2
Shri Mahabirji railway station (Patonda Hindaun)	SMBJ	West Central Railways	3
Phatehsinghpura railway station, Suroth (Suroth Hindaun)	FSP	West Central Railways	2
Sikroda Meena railway station (Hindaun City)	SRM	West Central Railways	2
Dhindhora HKMKD railway station (Dhindhora Hindaun)	DNHK	West Central Railways	2

== See also ==
- Hindaun
- Hindaun Block
- Hindaun City bus depot
- Karauli district
