= Danalpur =

- village
- Location in Rajasthan, India Danalpur (India)
- Coordinates: 26.78°N 76.9°E
- Country: India
- State: Rajasthan
- District: Karauli
- Subdistricts: Shri Mahaveer Ji Block

Languages (Hindi)
  - Official: Hindi
- Time zone: UTC+5:30 (IST)
- Postal code: 322230
- ISO 3166 code: RJ-IN
- Vehicle registration: RJ-
- Vidhan Sabha constituency: Hindaun City

Danalpur is a village in Shri Mahaveer Ji Block of Rajasthan, India. It is located near Shri Mahavirji, which is a famous Jain religious place and is well connected to Jaipur ( the capital of Rajasthan) through State Highway. The population mainly consists of Meenas. The people here are well educated and hold high government positions. Distances from various cities:

- Hindaun City: 18.2 km
- Jaipur: 140 km
- Shri Mahavirji: 2 km
- Karauli: 30 km
