= Chandangaon =

Chanangaon
- Village
- Country: India
- State: Madhya Pradesh
- District: Chhindwara

Population
  - Total: 50,501

Chandangaon is a village in the Chhindwara district in Madhya Pradesh, India. Chandangaon is 4 kilometers from Chhindwara.
