= Todoopura =

- Gram Panchayat
- Location in Rajasthan, India Todoopura (India)
- Coordinates: 26.38°N 76.60°E
- Country: India
- State: Rajasthan
- District: Karauli
- Tehsil: Hindaun Tehsil
- Elevation: 235 m (771 ft)

Population (2011)
  - Total: 7,000

Languages
  - Official: Hindi
- Time zone: UTC+5:30 (IST)
- PIN: 322234
- Telephone code: 91-7469
- ISO 3166 code: RJ-IN
- Vehicle registration: RJ 34
- Sex ratio: 815:1000 ♂/♀

Todoopura is a village in Hindaun Block, Karauli district in the Indian State of Rajasthan.

Todoopura is located on the karaouli- hindaun highway. the village's current population is near 7000.

The majority caste in this village is jagarwad, (Meena community). jagarwad is the subcaste of zamindar meena (Meena community ). jagarwad people are famous for their strong control in the area.12 villages belongs to jagarwad sub cast.
