= Jaggar Dam =

Jaggar Dam Hindaun Karauli
- Country: India
- Location: Hindaun Block, Karauli District, Rajasthan
- Coordinates: 26.7°N 77.0°E
- Purpose: water storage
- Opening date: 1957; 68 years ago

Dam and spillways
- Type of dam: Earthen
- Impounds: Banas River
- Height: 30 ft (9.1 m)
- Length: 1,585 ft (483 m)

Jagar Dam, Hindaun

Jaggar Dam is an Earthen dam near Jagar Village of Hindaun City in Hindaun Block, Rajasthan, India. The dam was completed in 1957 for the purpose of irrigation and water supply.

== Tourism ==
Jagar Dam is located in Jagar of Hindaun City, Rajasthan. During the weekend, visitors come in groups to picnic in the surroundings and cold air. This is a public place in Aravali hills. Located in the Aravali range is a popular place like a hill station. It is home to its elevation, rivers, lakes and forests. This place is natural related. The local people of village Kotwas have an important contribution in making this natural place safe for animals.
