= Vanki =

Vanki Ваньки
- Selo
- Location within Perm Krai Location within Russia
- Coordinates: 56°50′N 54°22′E
- Country: Russia
- Region: Perm Krai
- District: Chaykovsky
- Time zone: UTC+5:00

Vanki (Russian: Ваньки) is a rural locality (a selo) and the administrative center of Vankovskoye Rural Settlement, Chaykovsky, Perm Krai, Russia. The population was 553 as of 2010. There are 7 streets.

== Geography ==
Vanki is located 34 km northeast of Chaykovsky. Stepanovo is the nearest rural locality.
