= Karauli =

- City
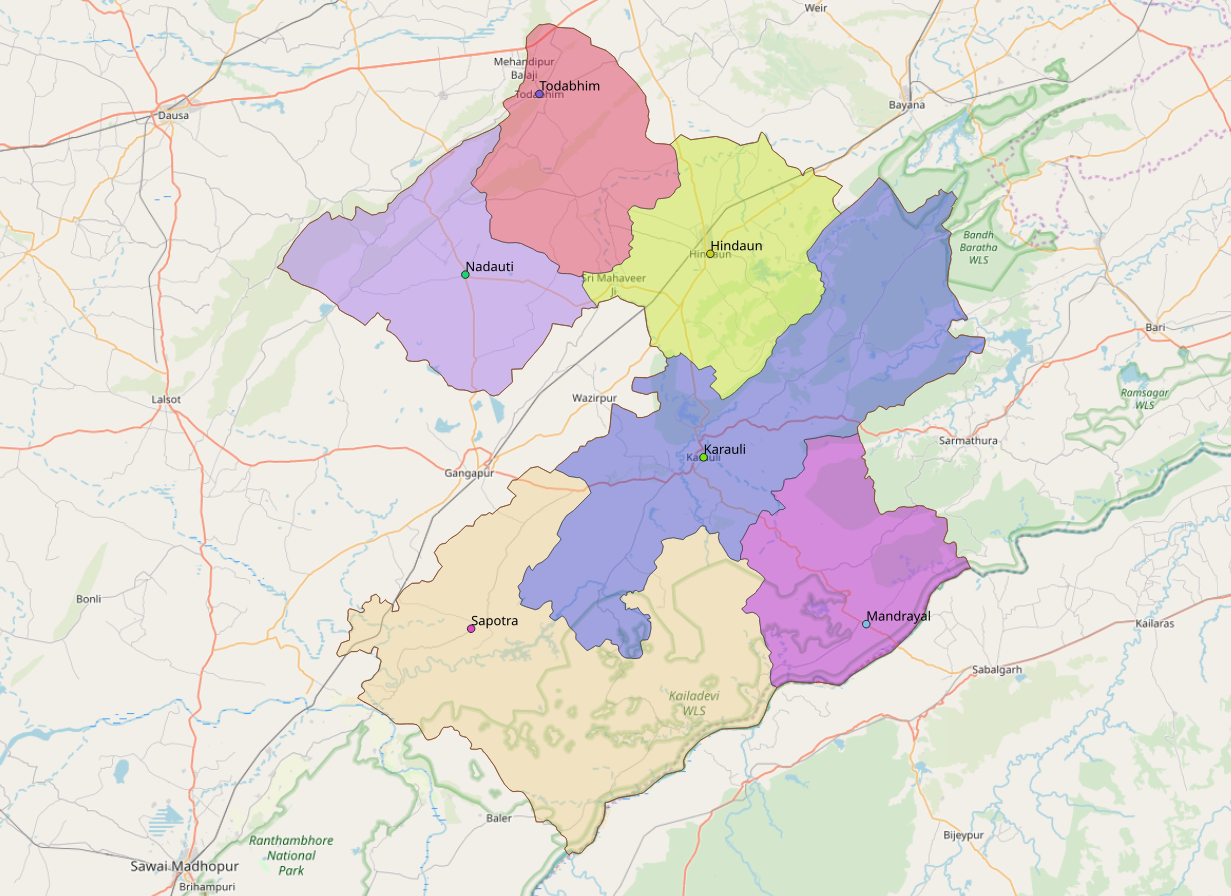

- Location in Rajasthan, India Karauli (India)
- Coordinates: 26.5°N 77.02°E
- Country: India
- State: Rajasthan
- District: Karauli
- Founder: Raja Bijaipal

Government
  - Body: Nagar Parishad

Area
  - Total: 18 km^{2} (6.9 sq mi)
- Elevation: 275 m (902 ft)

Population (2011)
  - Total: 82,960
  - Density: 4,600/km^{2} (12,000/sq mi)

Languages
  - Official: Hindi
  - Native: Rajasthani, Braj Bhasha
- Time zone: UTC+5:30 (IST)
- PIN: 322241
- Vehicle registration: RJ 34
- Website: karauli.rajasthan.gov.in

Karauli (also formerly spelled Karoli or Karaulee) is a city in the Indian state of Rajasthan. The city was formerly named Kalyanpuri. It is in the Braj region and holds religious importance in Hinduism. The city is the administrative center of Karauli District and was formerly the capital of the erstwhile princely state of Karauli. Karauli District comes under Bharatpur Divisional Commissionerate.

== Geography ==
Karauli is at 26.5°N 77.02°E. It has an average elevation of 275 metres (902 ft).

== History ==
=== Ancient history ===
Karauli was a part of the Matsya Kingdom (1400-300 BCE), one of the 16 ancient Mahājanapadas.

Earlier, Karauli, along with Alwar, was part of the Matsya kingdom, according to the legend of Mahabharata. The modern princely state Karauli State was founded in about 995 by ruler Raja Bijai Pal Jadaun, who claimed descent from the Hindu god Krishna. His Highness the Maharaja maintains a military force of 281 cavalry, 1640 infantry, and 56 guns, and is entitled to a salute of 17 guns (as of 1892).

The Britishers later occupied it, and they ruled up to 1947. The Maharaja's palace is a handsome block of buildings, some of them dating to the mid-18th century. Karauli State was founded by Maharaja Bijaipal. The dynasty is said to be of Yaduvanshi Jadaun Rajputs. A municipality was established at Karauli in 1884.

== Tourist Destinations. ==
Karauli is famous for various tourist destination including the religious tourism. Madan Mohan Ji Temple, Kaila Devi Temple, Shri Mahaveer Ji Temple, Mehandipur Balaji, Mandrayal Fort, Baithe Hanuman ji Temple are destinations.

== Demographics ==
Religions in Karauli
Religion	Percent
Hindus	76.90%
Muslims	22.54%

As of 2011 India census, Karauli had a population of 82,960. Males constitute 53% of the population and females 47%. Karauli has an average literacy rate of 53%, lower than the national average of 59.5%. Male literacy is 65%, and female literacy is 41%. In Karauli, 19% of the population is under 6 years of age.

== Famous Personalities ==
1. Kunwar Madan Singh – Famous for Satyagraha in Karauli and Hunger strike in 1927.
