= Todabhim =

Todabhim toda
- Urban Town
- Todabhim
- Nickname: Toda
- Location in Karauli, Rajasthan, India
- Coordinates: 26.9167°N 76.8167°E
- Country: India
- State: Rajasthan
- District: Karauli district
- Division: Bharatpur
- Rajasthan Legislative Assembly Constituency: Todabhim

Government
  - Type: Municipal Board
  - Body: Municipality (NagarPalika)Todabhim
  - Chairperson: AMRITA MEENA (INC)
  - MLA: Ghanshyam Mahar(INC)

Area
  - Total: 14.23 km^{2} (5.49 sq mi)

Population (2011)
  - Total: 33,876
  - Rank: 3rd in Karauli diatrict
  - Density: 2,381/km^{2} (6,166/sq mi)
- Demonym: Indian

Language
  - Official: Hindi English
- Time zone: UTC+5:30 (IST)
- PIN: 321611
- Telephone code: 07461
- Vehicle registration: RJ34

Todabhim is a city and a "municipality" in Karauli district in the Indian state of Rajasthan. It is headquarters of Todabhim sub division, tehsil and C&RD block of Karauli district.

== History ==
Todabhim was established by Bodamalji Ushara in 302 AD. He was from Ushara clan of Meena tribe, which ruled over Bundi.

Later, the Meenas of Ushahara gotra were defeated by the Meenas of Jorwal gotra and the rule of Jorwal gotra started here.

Todabhim is a prominent historical site where Shri Jagannath Singh Ji's family is believed to have ruled for over 500 years in Todabhim city.

== Transport ==
Todabhim is accessible by road and by rail. Balaji mod bus stop on National Expressway 21 is 7 km. All types of bus service provide access to Agra and Jaipur. Taxi and autorickshaws are available. Bandikui Jn on Delhi-Jaipur section and Hindaun city on Delhi-Kota section of Indian railways are major railheads, about 45 km both from there. Jaipur international airport is the nearest airport.

== Demographics ==
Todabhim Tehsil of Karauli district has total population of 251,180 as per the 2011 Census. 134,604 are males while 116,576 are females. In 2011 43,488 families resided in Todabhim Tehsil. The average sex ratio of Todabhim Tehsil is 866.

90.9% lived in rural areas. The average literacy rate in urban areas is 73.7% while in the rural areas it is 68.1%. The Sex Ratio in urban areas is 902 while rural areas it was 863.

The population of Children of age 0–6 years in Todabhim Tehsil is 40,801 which is 16% of the total population. 22208 male children and 18593 female children are between the age 0–6 years. Thus the Child Sex Ratio of Todabhim Tehsil is 837 which is less than (866) in Todabhim Tehsil.

== Climate ==
Temperature in summer ranges between 25 °C and 45 °C and in winter it is between 2 °C and 23 °C.

== Todabhim Tehsil Data ==
As per the Population Census 2011 data, following are some quick facts about Todabhim Tehsil.

	Total	Male	Female
Children (0-6)	40,806	22,208	18,598
Literacy	68.66%	71.12%	41.78%
Scheduled Cast	57,302	30,322	26,980
Scheduled Tribe	81,246	43,757	37,489
Literate	106,743	38,872	67,871
