= Mandawara =

- Village
- Location in Rajasthan, India Mandawara (India)
- Coordinates: 27.02°N 75.0°E
- Country: India
- State: Rajasthan
- District: Didwana-Kuchaman

Government
  - Type: Gram Panchayat
- Elevation: 369 m (1,211 ft)

Population (2011)
  - Total: 2,876

Languages
  - Official: Hindi, Rajasthani
- Time zone: UTC+5:30 (IST)
- PIN: 341508
- ISO 3166 code: RJ-IN
- Vehicle registration: RJ21

Mandawara is a village under Kuchaman City tehsil in Didwana-Kuchaman district in the Indian state of Rajasthan.

== Geography ==
Mandawara is located at 27.02°N 75.0°E. It has an average elevation of 369 metres (1,210 feet).

== Demographics ==
As of 2001 Indian census, Mandawara had a population of 2,876. Males constitute 53% of the population and females 47%. Mandawara has an average literacy rate of 65%, higher than the national average of 59.5%: male literacy is 73%, and female literacy is 56%. In Mandawara, 16% of the population is under 6 years of age.

== Schools ==
A number of schools are located in Mandawara:

- Global College
- Noble ITI College
- Marwar College
- Motherland public School
- Government Secondary School

== Connectivity ==
Mandawara is well connected with Nh 8 highway
