= Billy Jagar =

Elder of the Yirrganydji people

Billy Jagar (1870–1930) was an Australian Aboriginal elder of the Yirrganydji people of north Queensland. He has been called the King of the Barron. After his death, one of his king plates was lost for sixty years.
