= Mehandipur Balaji Temple =

Hindu Temple in the Indian state of Rajasthan

Mahendipur Balaji Ji Temple
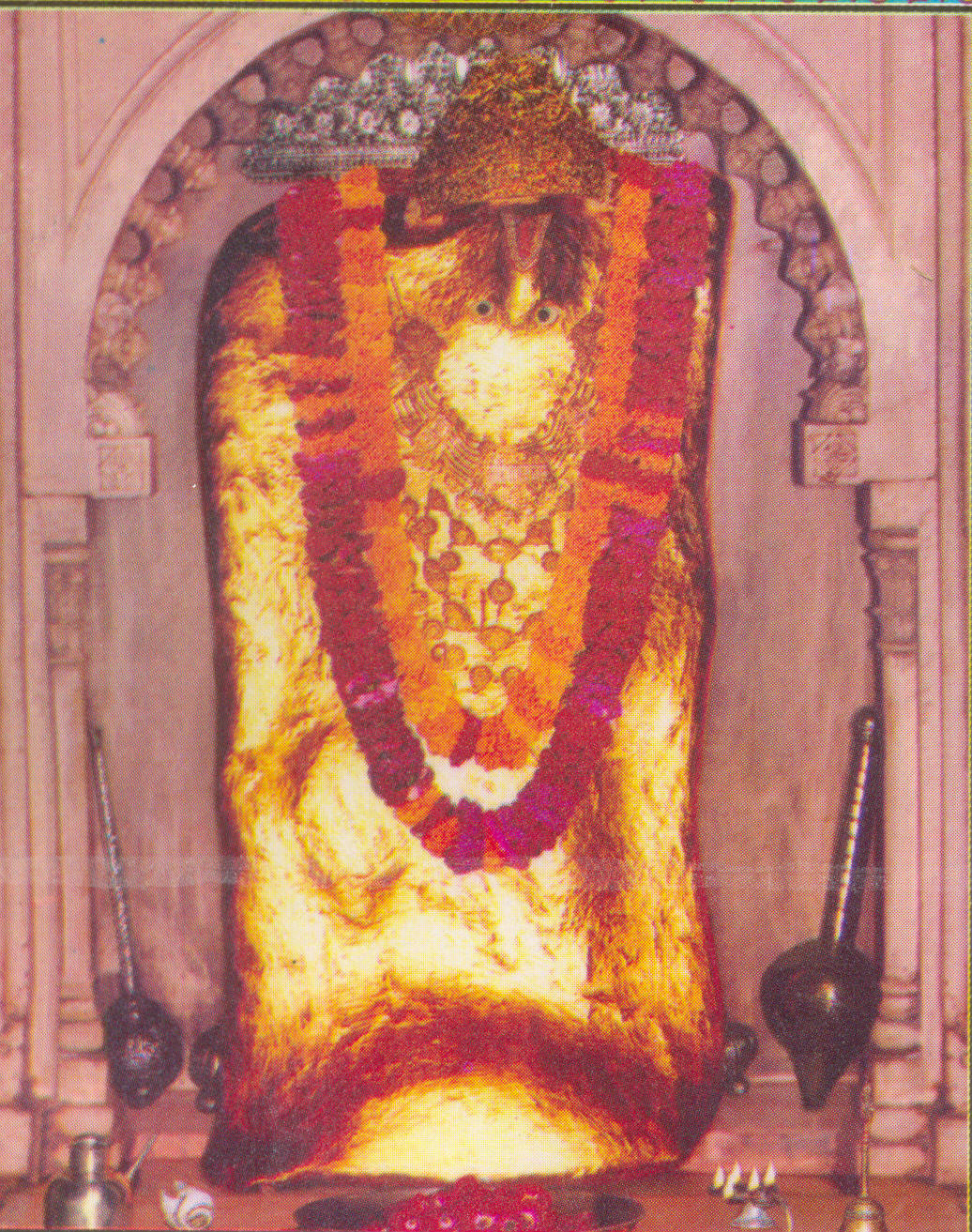
- Idol of Hanuman at the main shrine

- Location in Rajasthan Location in India

Religion
- Affiliation: Hinduism
- District: Dausa
- Deity: Hanuman

Location
- Location: Mahendipur
- State: Rajasthan
- Country: India
- Coordinates: 26.94°N 76.79°E

Website
- shribalajimehandipur.org

Mehandipur Balaji Temple is a temple in Mehandipur, Dausa district, in the Indian state of Rajasthan dedicated to the Hindu deity Hanuman. The name Balaji refers to the childhood form of Hanuman, revered in several parts of the country. Unlike similar religious sites, it is in a town rather than the countryside. Its reputation for ritualistic healing and exorcism of evil spirits attracts many pilgrims from Rajasthan and elsewhere. the year. Nearest Railway Station is Bandikui Junction

== Research ==
In 2013, an international team of scientists, scholars, and psychiatrists from Germany, The Netherlands, AIIMS, and the University of Delhi started a study to evaluate all aspects of the treatments and rituals taking place at the temple.
