= Timangarh =

Fort in India

Timangarh Fort
- Rajasthan, India
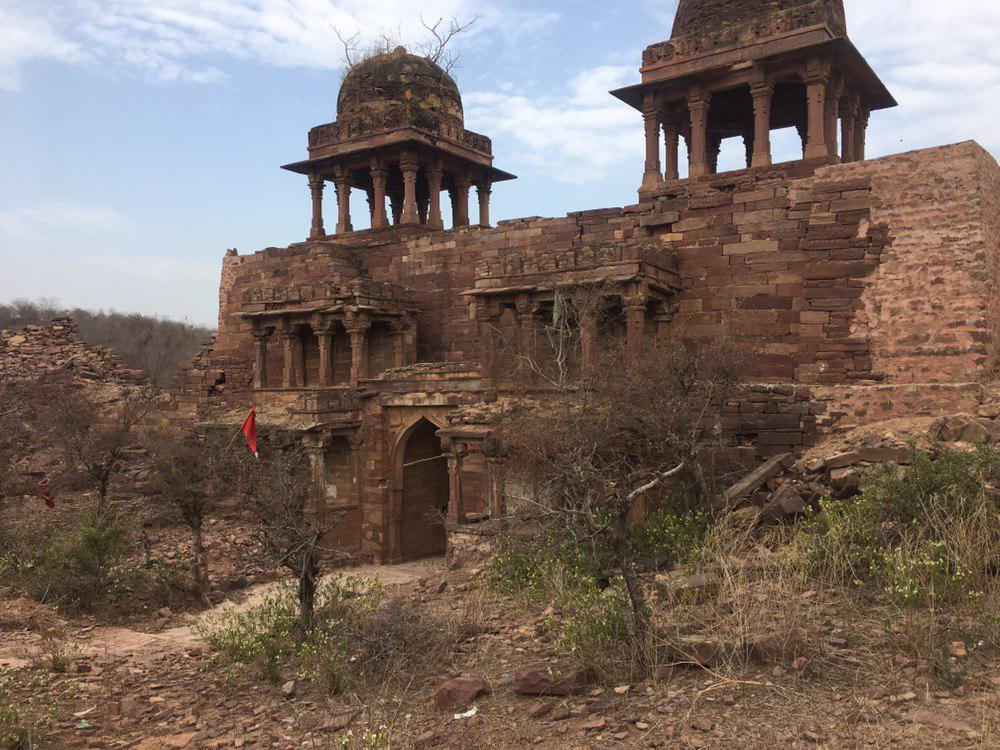
- Timangarh

Location
- Location within Rajasthan Location within India
- Coordinates: 26.705°N 77.260°E

Timan Garh is a historical fort of the Karauli State, situated near Masalpur in Karauli District on old Agra-Karauli highway Indian state of Rajasthan.

The ASI, State Government and Central Government of India have taken no steps to preserve this fort and as a result, its about 50 temples (10 large) have been destroyed and dug up by local villagers.

== History ==
The Timangarh fort was earlier known as Tribhuvangiri, Tahangarh, and Tawangarh. It was commissioned by the local ruler Tahanpal (also called Tribhuvanpala or Tawanpal) of the Jadaun Rajputs & Shoorsainis, who probably reigned during 1093-1140, and whose family claimed descent from the legendary king Yadu. His father Vijayapal had moved from Mathura to Mani Hills near Bayana after facing frequent invasions, including that of Mahmud of Ghazni. Vijayapal ruled from Vijayagarh, a fort that he had repaired, and was killed in a conflict with the Ghaznavids. Subsequently, his successors ruled from Timangarh.

Timangarh became a major center of Shaivism, especially that of the Pashupata sect during the 12th century. Several Jain texts also mention it as a prosperous center of learning and temples.

One of Tahanpal's successors - Kumarapal (alias Kunwarpal) - lost the fort to Muhammad of Ghor. According to Hasan Nizami's Tajul-Ma'asir, which calls the fort "Thangar" (a corruption of "Tahangarh"), Muhammad spared the life of Kumarapal, and appointed Bahauddin Tughril as the administrator of the fort. Minhaj-i Siraj Juzjani's Tabaqat-i Nasiri, which calls the fort "Thankar", confirms this account. Kumarapal's successors were reduced to the status of fief holders. The Jadon rulers of Karauli State claim descended from them.

The fort remained an important military outpost and administrative centre of the Delhi Sultanate and the Mughal Empire. Alexander Cunningham, the founder of the Archaeological Survey of India, surveyed the fort in 1882-1883. According to local lore, several idols from different places were brought and buried here to prevent their desecration by Muslim invaders. Soon after the independence of India in 1947, illegal excavators - including former royal families - smuggled away many ancient idols from the site. In 1985, smugglers brought helicopters and took away several artefacts with help of local residents.

Vinod Kumar Singh of Indian History Congress surveyed the fort in 1993 and 1998, noting several ruined structures and four Sanskrit-language inscriptions not recorded by Cunningham. He could not trace two Persian-language inscriptions and a mosque recorded by Cunningham.

== Architecture ==
This Fort is spread over an area of 51.5 hectares approximately. Earlier, it was a very huge Fort, but now it is in a ruined state. It originally had five entrances to which some more gates were added by the Mughals. The gates built later on have stone blocks of different colors and variety and some stones slabs have writings on them. The remains of an ancient township with palaces, bazaars, houses and Temples can be seen inside the Fort Complex. The rooftops and the pillars of these structures are adorned with geometrical, religious and flower-patterned carvings. The sculptures of Hindu gods and goddesses and their tantric counterparts also adorn these pillars. The idols recovered from the area belong to Hindu, Jain community and are mostly of Ganesha and Vishnu.
