= Shri Mahaveer Ji temple =

Indian Jain Temple

Shri Mahaveer Ji Temple
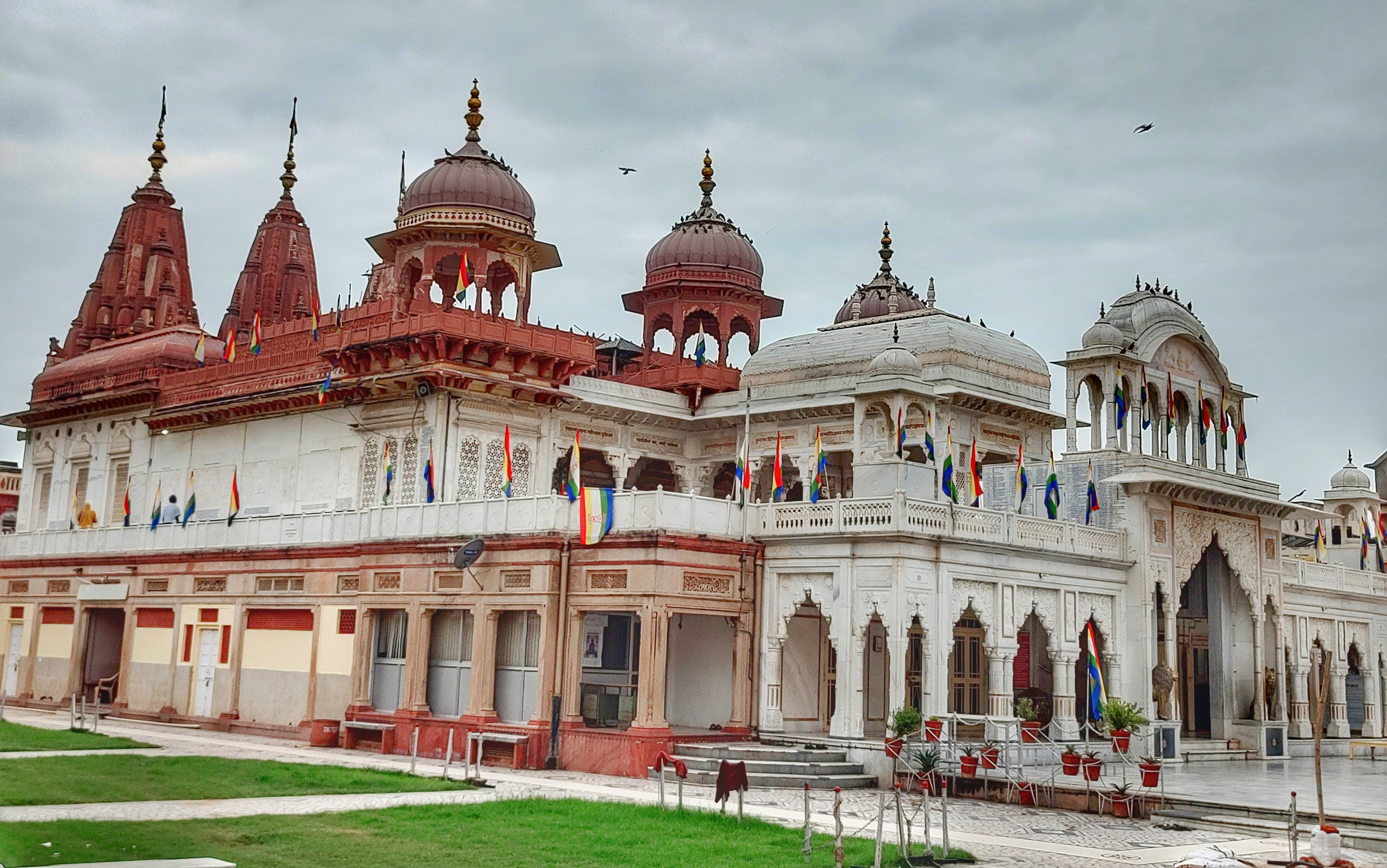
- Image of the Shri Mahaveerji Temple

- Location of Shri Mahavirji Jain Temple

Religion
- Affiliation: Jainism
- Sect: Digambara
- Deity: Mahavira
- Festivals: Mahavira Janma Kalyanaka, Diwali
- Governing body: Shri Mahaveer Ji Trust

Location
- Location: Karauli, Hindaun, Rajasthan
- State: Rajasthan
- Country: India
- Coordinates: 26°41′43.7″N 76°55′48.78″E

Architecture
- Style: Nagara architecture
- Creator: Amar Chand Bilala
- Established: 17th century
- Temple: 8

Website
- www.shreemahaveerji.com

The Shri Digambar Jain Atishaya Kshetra Shri Mahaveer Ji Temple is major Jain pilgrimage site situated in the Shri Mahaveerji town in Hindaun Block, Karauli district in Rajasthan.

== Main temple ==
There are five temples in Shri Digambar Jain Mahavirji. Atishaya Kshetra Shri Mahavira is considered one of the miraculous pilgrimages of Jains. This pilgrimage is situated at banks of Gambhir river in Hindaun Block of Karauli district, Rajasthan. Built at the bank of a river, this pilgrimage is a prominent centre of devotion for Digambar Jain devotees. Chandanpur Mahavira temple is hailed as the heart of pilgrimages. The temple is visited by millions of Jain and Hindu devotees every year.

The temple trust extends various charitable and philanthropic services such as a dispensary, aushadhalaya (pharmacy), school, library, rehabilitation centre, promotion and extension of education, cultural and literary activities, scholarships, and research and study in Prakrit language. The temple also has a naturopathy and yoga centre.

=== History ===
The temple was constructed by Digamber Jain merchant, Amar Chand Bilala, in the 17th century upon the discovery of the idol of Mahavira. This is a sacred place of the tradition of Jainism. Mahavirji also had a Bhattaraka seat which became defunct in 1970.

=== Discovery of the Idol ===
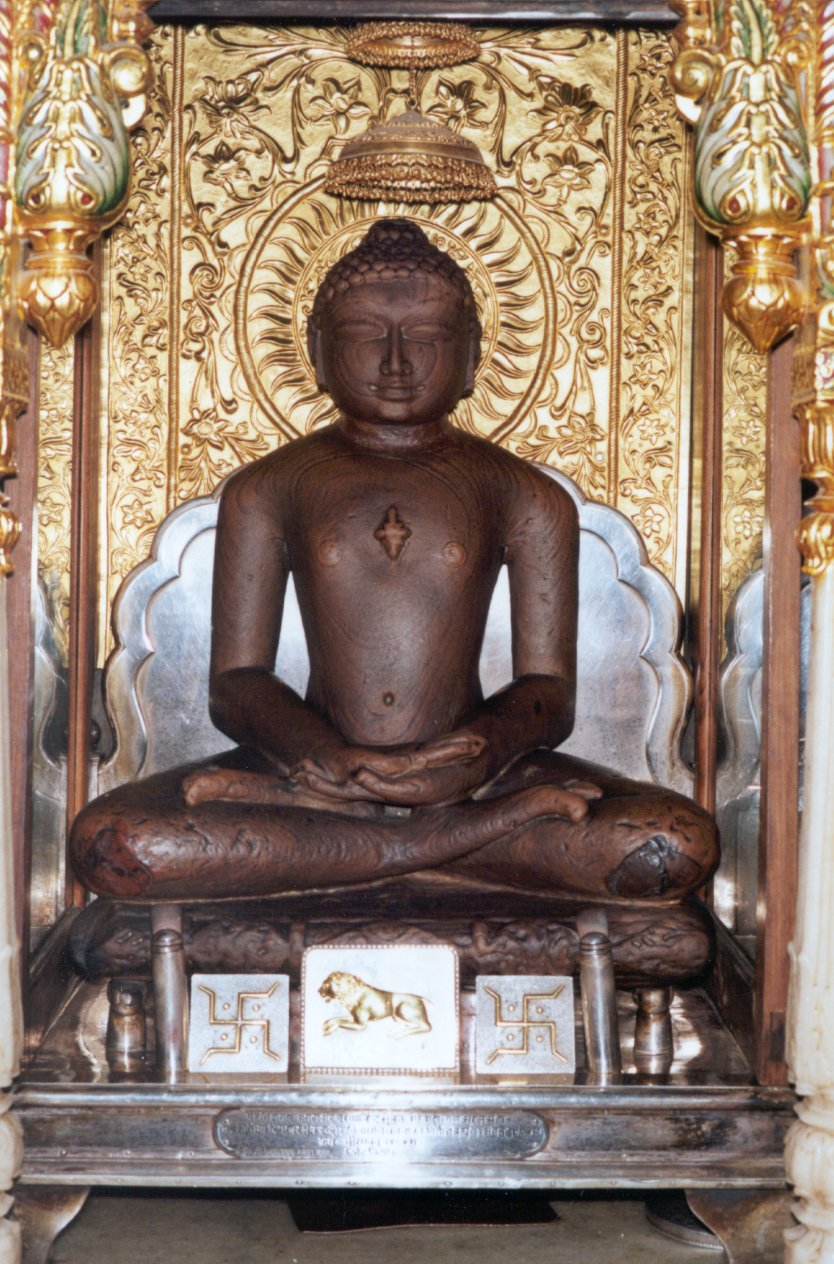
The idol of Mahavira at the temple

The main temple contains the statue of Mahavira and along with idols of other Tirthankaras. The 'Mulnayak pratima' (main statue) is nearly 78 centimetres (2.56 ft) high and is carved out of sandstone. In this statue Mahavira is sitting in the padmasana posture.

The iconic idol of Mahavira, the principal deity of the pilgrimage temple, was found during an excavation. It was later found to be more than 1000 years old. According to legend, a Meena dairy farmer named Krapa Ram noticed that one of his cows was always dry of milk. When cow belonging used to pour out its milk every day upon a mound near Chandanpur village. It was surprising for the owner of that cow and the villagers. They excavated the mound and found the idol of Mahavira. The villagers dedicated themselves to building a small hut over the idol where the idol was found. The place is now known as devata-ka tilla or chharan chatri. The news of the miracles idol spread and a Jain merchant, Amar Chand Bilala visited the site and realised that it was a Jain idol. The King of Jaipur tried to execute the merchant but was saved by the miracles of the idol. Amar Chand Bilala constructed a vast & magnificent temple here.

According to legends, while trying to move the idol on a chariot to the temple constructed a few yards from the excavation site, the chariot did not move. Amar Chand Bilala prayed for the idol to move and the god replied that the chariot will move when Krapa Ram pushes the cart. At the site where the idol was excavated a small shrine chharan chatri with the representation of the footprint of the deity was constructed. The shrine is still managed by the family of Krapa Ram.

=== Architecture ===
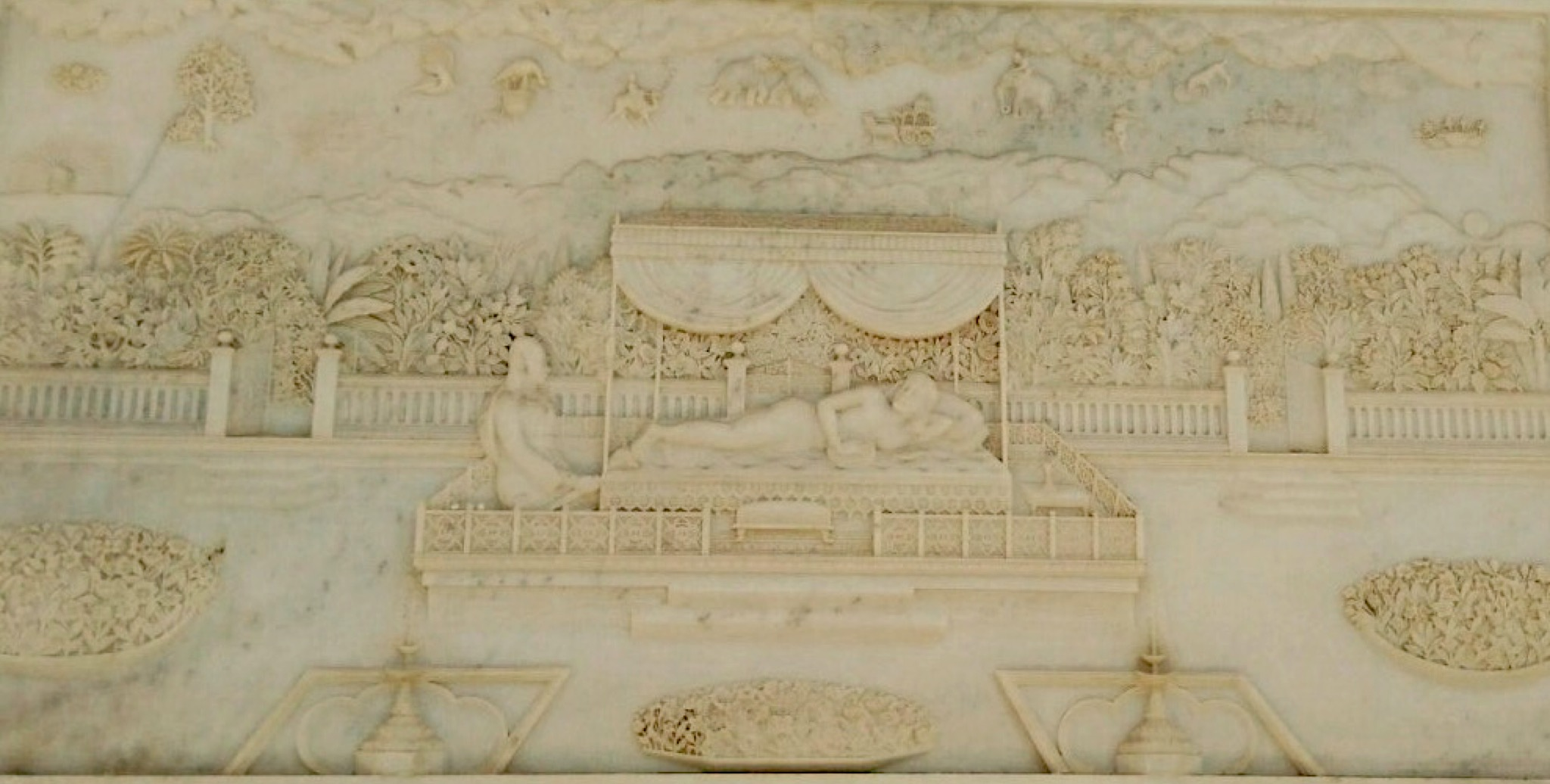
Carings of Chandragupta Maurya's sixteen dreams

The main temple of Shri Digambar Jain Mahaverji is a large, ornamented structure constructed using marble and red sandstone. The temple exterior plan follows Māru-Gurjara architecture. The temple is built in Nagara architecture. The structure has oblong and canopied chhatris. The temple has multiple cusped arches that are supported by pillars and the spandrel is decorated with a fringe pattern. The temple has three pinnacles each bearing golden kalasha. This temple is surrounded by Dharmashalas. The area in which the Dharmashalas are situated, surrounding the temple, is called Katla. In the centre of Katla, the main temple is situated.

At the main gate, there comes a rectangular ground and then there are seven gates to enter the Mahamandapa. After entering the temple we found a big shrine before us. An icon of Mahavira resembling the miraculous principal deity and two other icons are installed here. In Garbh Griha (Central Room of Temple), on the main shrine, the miraculous icon of Mahavira in Padmāsana posture, coral-coloured made of sandstone is installed with Pushpadanta in the right side and Bhagavān Ādinātha’s icon in the left side. The temple also enshrines ancient icons of other Tirthankaras.

The exterior & interior walls of the temple are richly decorated with carvings and golden paintings of scenes from Mahavira's and Parshvanatha's life. There are exquisite carvings of 16 mythological scenes on the outer walls of the temple.

In the front of the main gate of the temple stands a 52 feet high marble Manastambha (column of pride). Four Tirthankara icons are installed at the top of Manstambha in all directions.

=== Mahamastakabhisheka ===
In 2022, Mahamastakabhisheka (transl. Grand Consecration) was organised here after 24 years and a 24 feet (7.3 m) statue of Mahavira has been installed here.

== Other temples ==
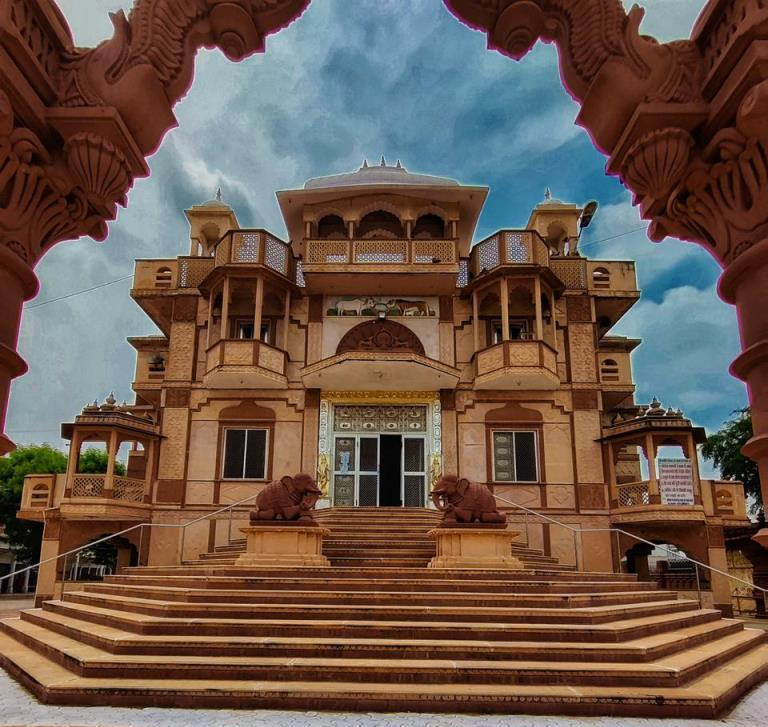
Shantinath Jinalaya

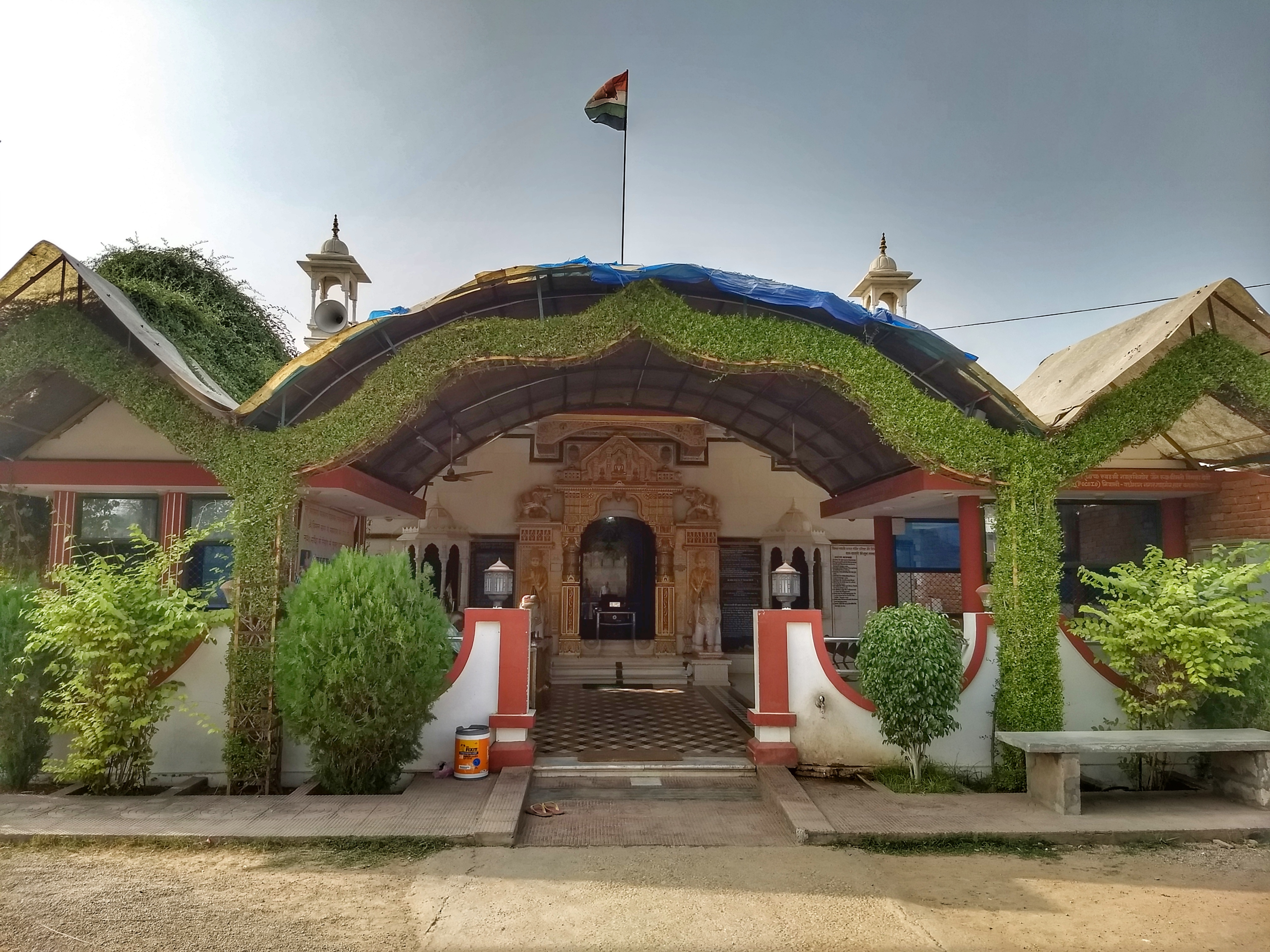
Kamal Mandir

=== Shantinath Jinalaya ===
Shantinath Jinalaya (Temple) at Shantiveer Nagar was built in the twentieth century. The main attraction of the temple is an imposing 32 feet high colossus statue of Shantinatha, the 16th Jain tirthankara, in kayotsarga posture. Icons of 24 Tirthankaras and their Shasan Deotas in sub-shrines are also installed here. An attractive sky-high Manastambha is also standing here. The temple features devakulika cells that follows Māru-Gurjara architecture.

=== Bhagwan Parshvanath Jinalaya ===
Bhagavān Parshvanatha Jinalaya, also called ‘Kanch Ka Mandir’ due to its mirror and glasswork, is situated in front of Sanmati Dharmashala. This temple was constructed by Late Bramhacharini Kamla Bai. The main idol of this temple is black coloured idol Parshvanatha.

=== Krishnabai Chaityalaya ===
Krishnabai chaityalaya was built in the 19th century. The temple features a double arch entrance, the first arch is foliated with a bud pattern & second is a round arch. The temple is a superstructure supported by pillars and canopied chhatri. The temple enshrines an idol of Mahavira in lotus position.

=== Bhavya Kamal Mandir ===
The Bhavya Kamal Mandir temple was constructed in the 20th century and is located on the road connecting Shantinath Jinalya and Main Temple. The temple is dedicated to Chandraprabha. The temple features a arched gateway and canopied chhatris.

== Annual Fair ==
An annual fair is organized in the temple premise around Mahavir Jayanti (April) which attracts Jains and people from many other communities including Meena and Gujjar and religions in a great number. The fair is for five days (starts 2 days prior to Mahavir Jayanti and ends two days post Mahavir Jayanti) and ends with a colourful Ratha Yatra pulled by Bullock cart. Many Jain sadhus or monks deliver religious discourses during this fair.

== Photo gallery ==
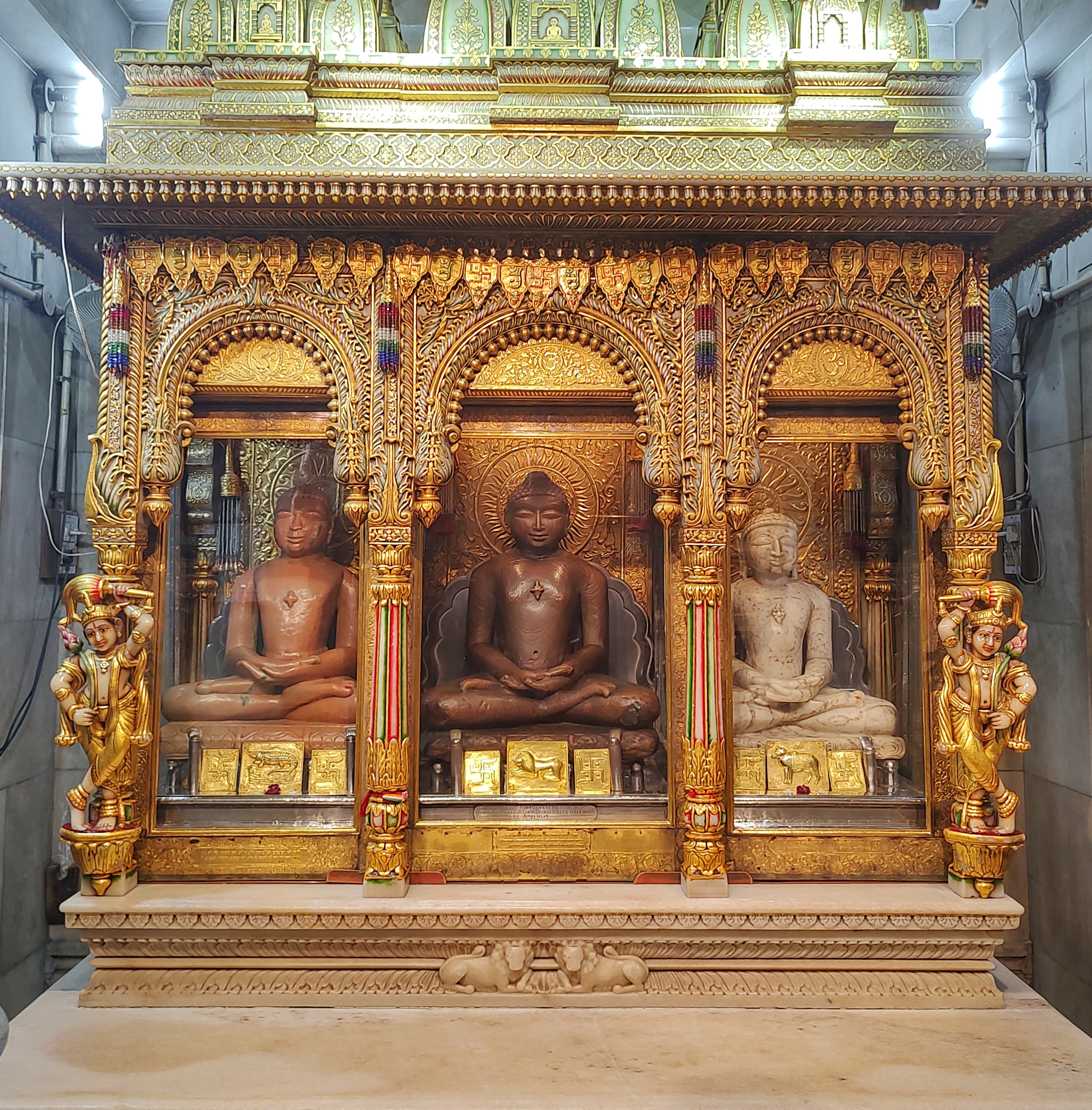
Main vedi with idols of Pushpadanta, Mahavira, Rishabhanatha

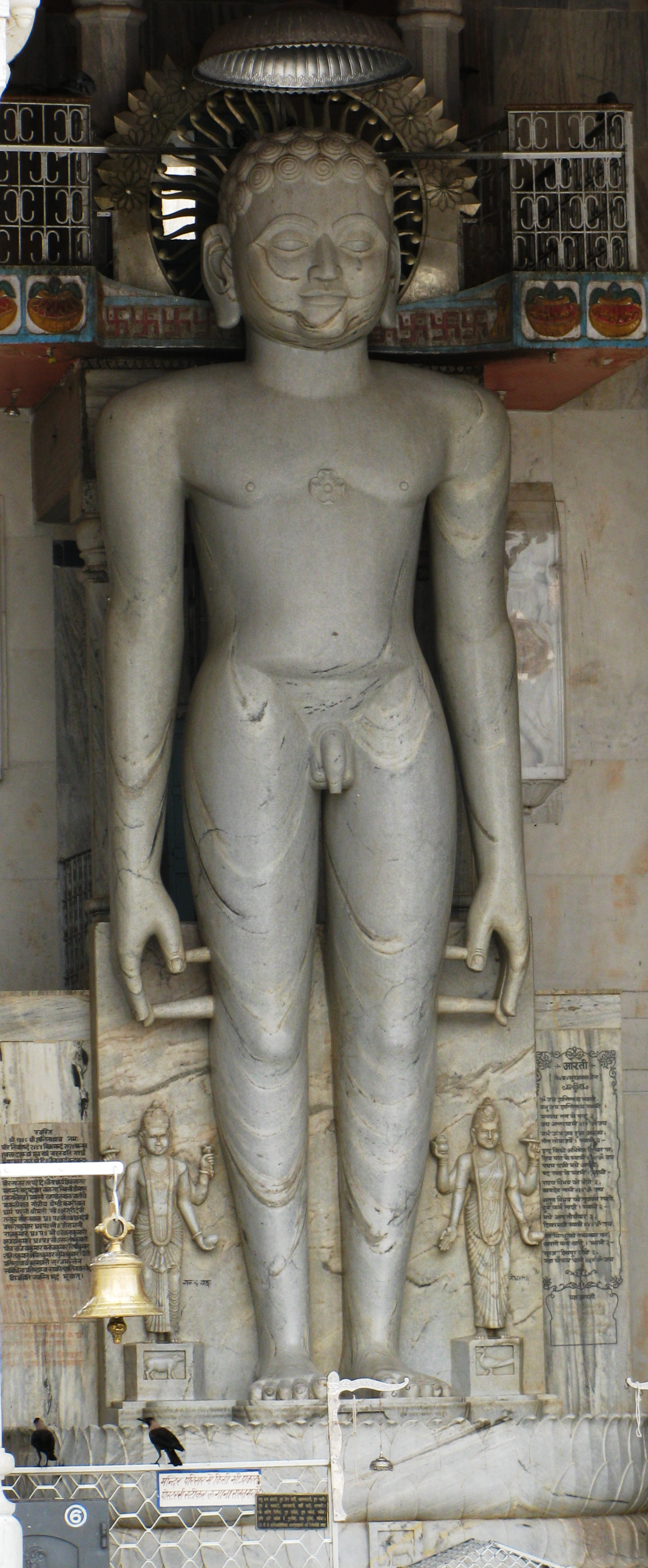
32 feet (9.8 m) statue of Shantinath at Shantinath Jinalaya

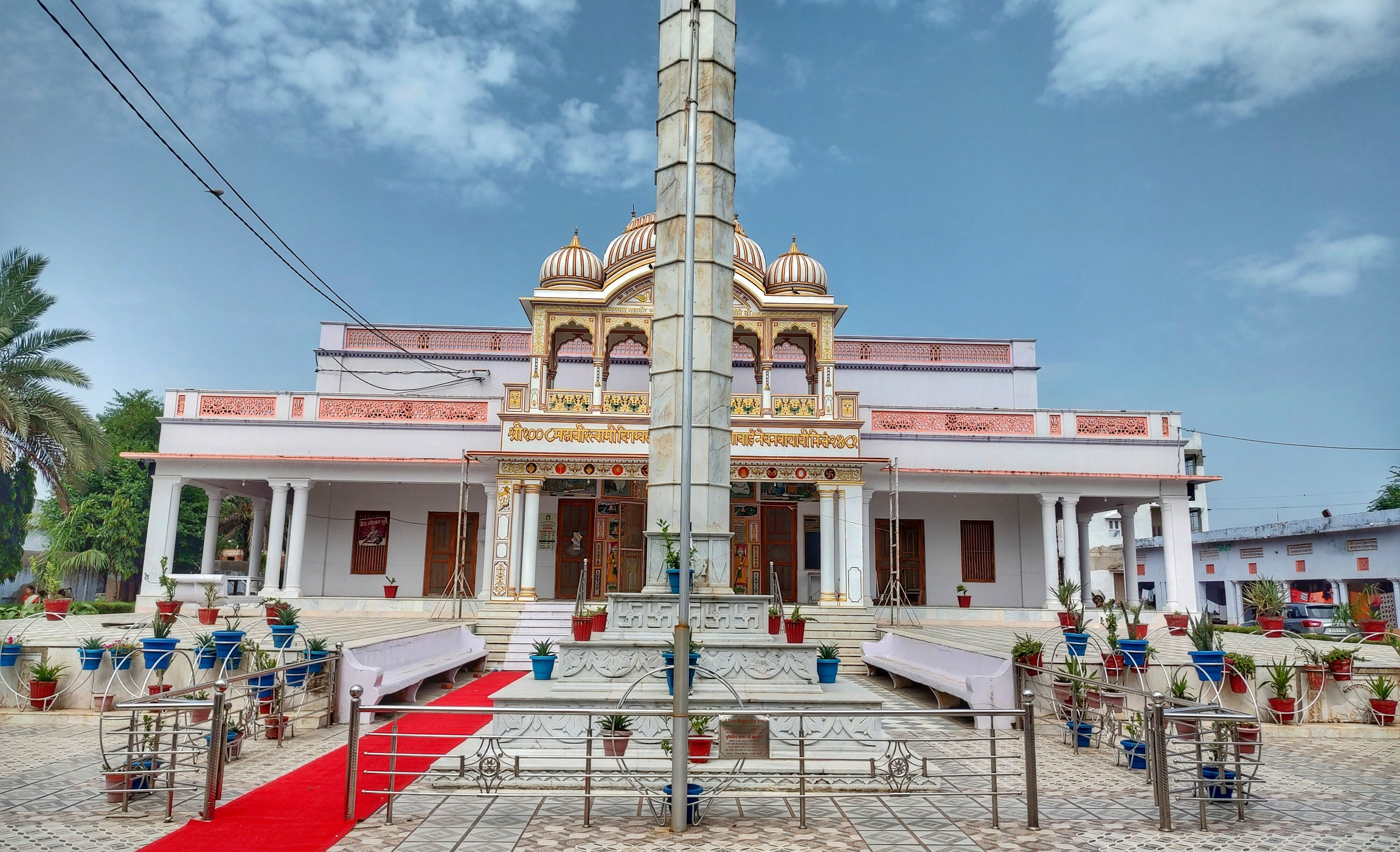
Krishnabai Chaityalaya

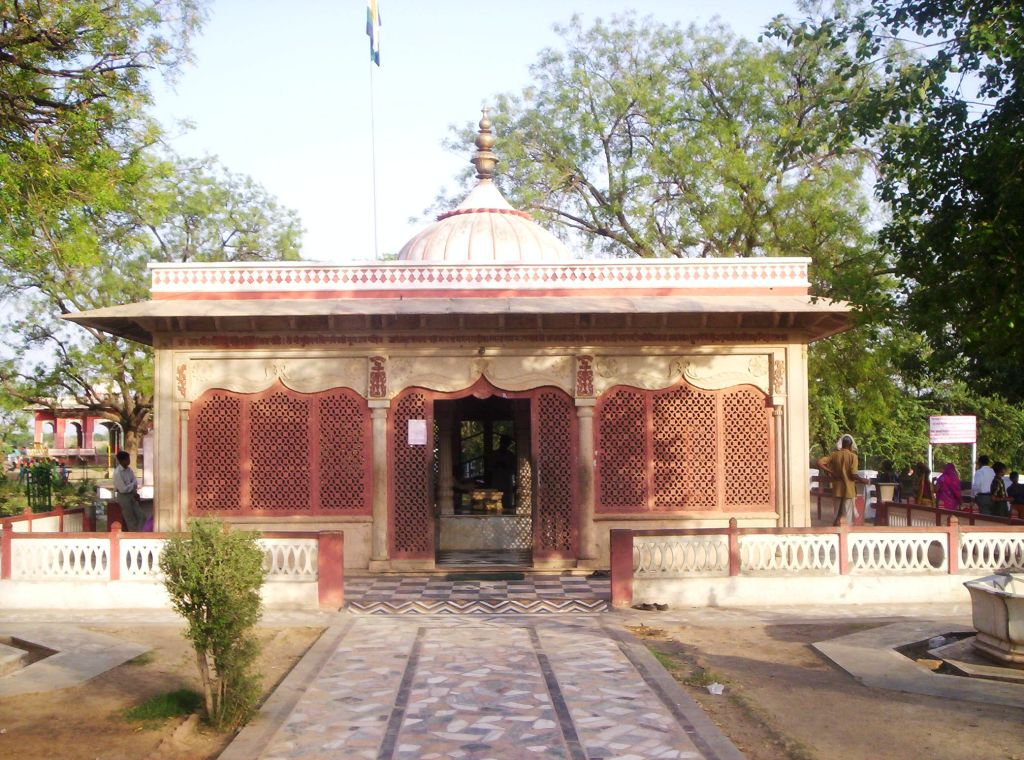
'Chharan chatri' location from where the main idol was excavated

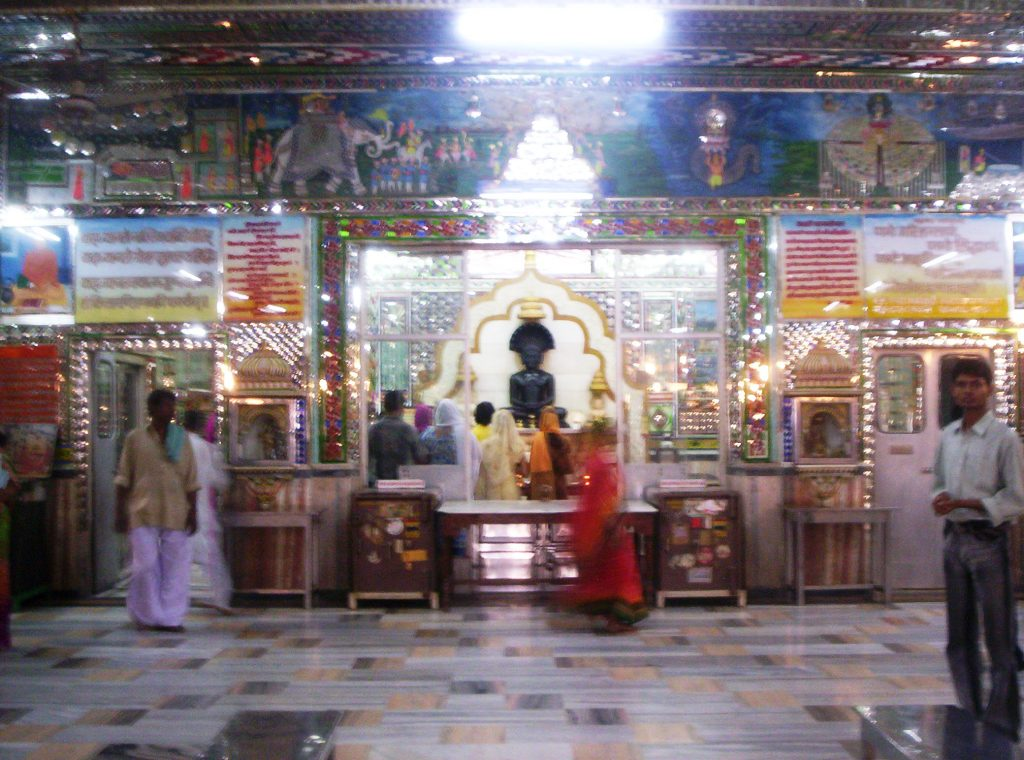
Kanch mandir

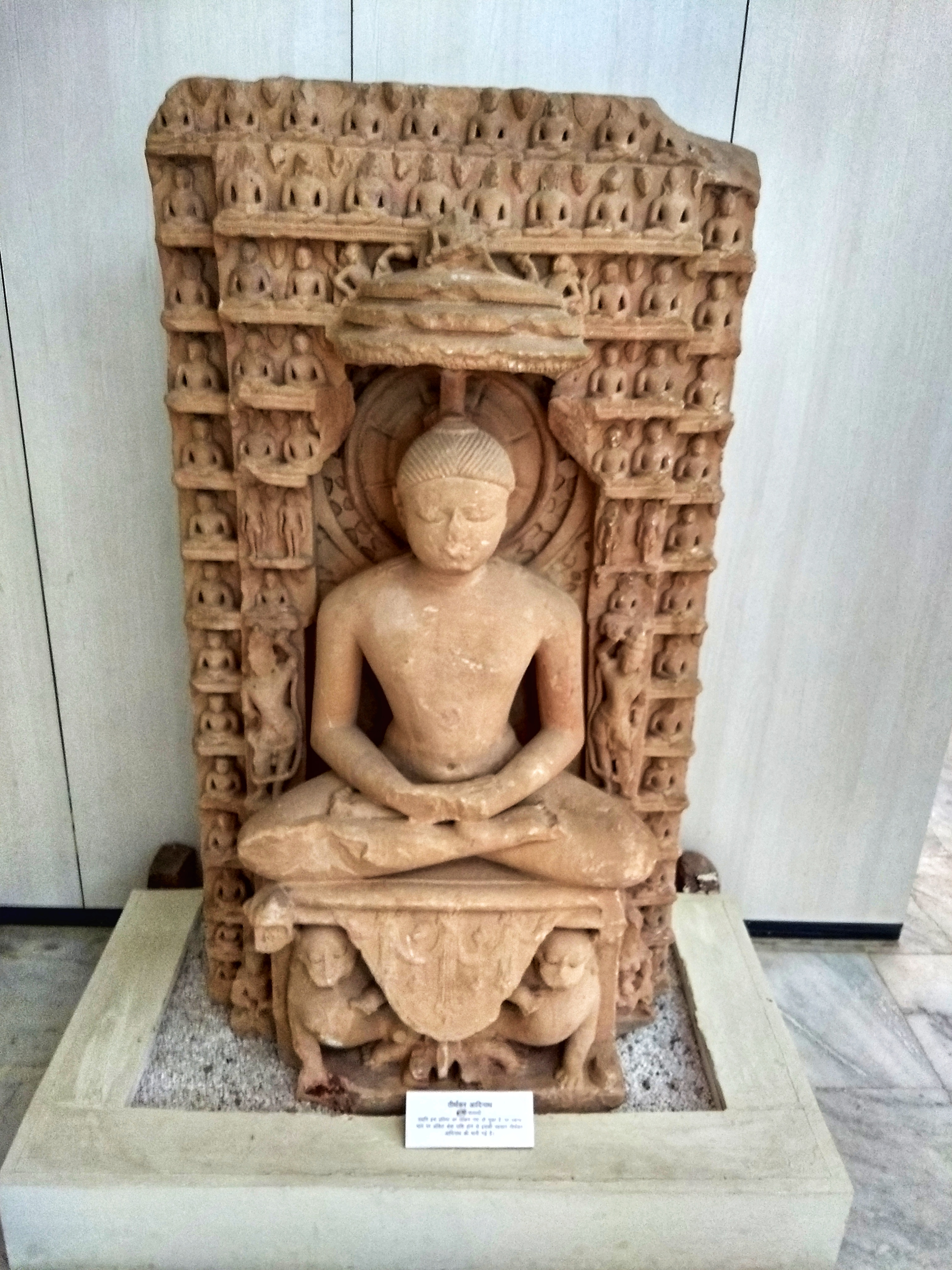
6th-century Statue of Rishabhanatha at Jain Museum
