= Chamrauli =

Chamrauli may refer to following places in India :-

1. Chamrauli, Barauli Ahir
2. Chamrauli, Chamba
3. Chamrauli, Fatehabad
4. Chamrauli, Shikohabad
5. Chamrauli, Unnao
