= Sahara, Agra =

Village in India

Sahara is a village in Bichpuri Block in Agra District of Uttar Pradesh State, India. It belongs to Agra Division. It is located 13 km towards west from District headquarters Agra. 3 km from Bichpuri. 356 km from State capital Lucknow

Sahara Pin code is 283105 and postal head office is B.V. Bichpuri.

Barara ( 2 km ), Angoothi ( 2 km ), Midhakur ( 3 km ), Bichpuri ( 3 km ), Garhsani ( 4 km ) are the nearby Villages to Sahara. Sahara is surrounded by Kanshiram Nagar Tehsil towards North, Mahamaya Nagar Tehsil towards North, Akola Tehsil towards South, Agra Tehsil towards East.

Agra, Achhnera, Fatehpur Sikri, Shamsabad, Agra are the nearby Cities to Sahara.

This Place is in the border of the Agra District and Mahamaya Nagar District. Mahamaya Nagar District Mahamaya Nagar is North towards this place. Also it is in the Border of other district Kanshiram Nagar.

== Population ==
Sahara is a large village located in Agra of Agra district, Uttar Pradesh with total 818 families residing. The Sahara village has population of 5098 of which 2626 are males while 2472 are females as per Population Census 2011.

In Sahara village population of children with age 0-6 is 815 which makes up 15.99% of total population of village. Average Sex Ratio of Sahara village is 941 which is higher than Uttar Pradesh state average of 912. Child Sex Ratio for the Sahara as per census is 1017, higher than Uttar Pradesh average of 902.

Sahara village has higher literacy rate compared to Uttar Pradesh. In 2011, literacy rate of Sahara village was 73.08% compared to 67.68% of Uttar Pradesh. In Sahara Male literacy stands at 86.77% while female literacy rate was 58.32%.

As per constitution of India and Panchyati Raaj Act, Sahara village is administrated by Sarpanch (Head of Village) who is elected representative of village.

Particulars	Total	Male	Female
Total No. of Houses	818	-	-
Population	5,098	2,626	2,472
Child (0-6)	815	404	411
Schedule Caste	855	433	422
Schedule Tribe	0	0	0
Literacy	73.08 %	86.77 %	58.32 %
Total Workers	1,588	1,242	346
Main Worker	1,107	0	0
Marginal Worker	481	233	248

== Religion ==
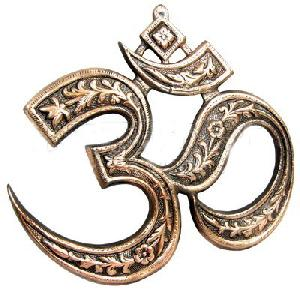

Sahara village is a devoted Hindu village and has 99.99% Hindu population, Few Muslim Family also lives here respectively.

Schedule Caste (SC) constitutes 16.77% of total population in Sahara village. The village Sahara currently does not have any Schedule Tribe (ST) population.

This village has a Krishna temple which constructed in 2014.

== Work profile ==
In Sahara village out of total population, 1588 were engaged in work activities. 69.71% of workers describe their work as Main Work (Employment or Earning more than 6 Months) while 30.29% were involved in Marginal activity providing livelihood for less than 6 months. Of 1588 workers engaged in Main Work, 448 were cultivators (owner or co-owner) while 198 were Agricultural labourer.

== Transportation ==
Village Sahara is connected with national highway 11 ( Agra to Jaipur via Fatehpur Sikri ) so Up Roadways Buses, Local City bus and auto Rickshaws easily available.

Nearest Railway Stations

Mirhakur Rail Way Station, Pathauli Rail Way Station are the nearby railway stations to Sahara. However Agra Cantonment railway station is a major railway station 11 km from Sahara

== School and colleges ==
There are many recognised School and colleges available for Higher and intermediate studies few are RBS College, Gd Goenika, and Shivalik school.
