= Sarokhipura =

- village
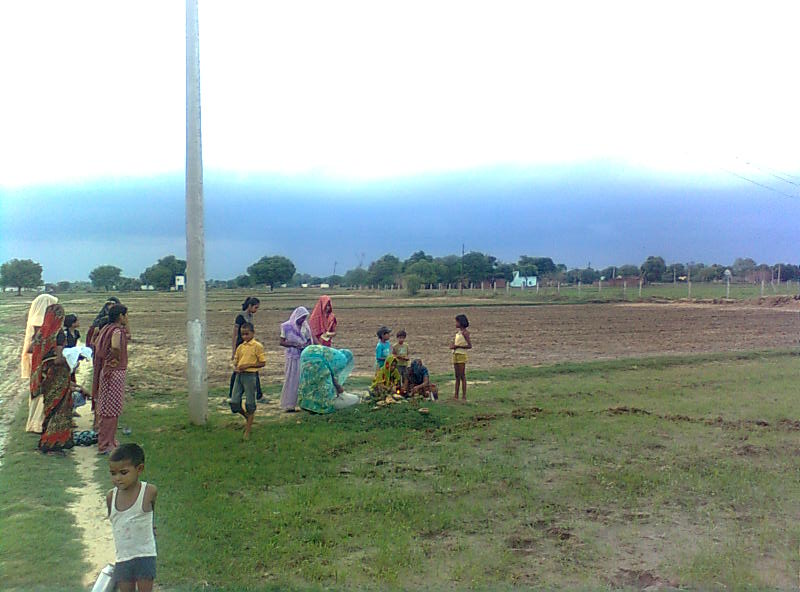

- Location in Uttar Pradesh, India Sarokhipura (India)
- Coordinates: 26.81°N 78.73°E
- Country: India
- State: Uttar Pradesh
- District: Agra

Area
  - Total: 76.25 km^{2} (29.44 sq mi)
- Elevation: 147 m (482 ft)

Population (2001)
  - Total: 320
  - Density: 4.2/km^{2} (11/sq mi)

Languages
  - Official: Hindi
- Time zone: UTC+5:30 (IST)
- PIN: 283114
- Telephone code: 5614-2771015
- Vehicle registration: UP80-XXXX
- Website: bateshwar.blogspot.com

Sarokhipura is a village in Panchayat Mukutpura of Jaitpur Kalan Block at Bah Tehsil of Agra, Uttar Pradesh, India India. It is situated on Fatehabad road 85 km from Agra City. This village mainly has Rajput Bhadauria and Brahmin communities.

== History ==
During February 1313, present residents of Sarokhipura migrated from Koshad village of Bhadawar estate Koshad was treasury of Bhadawar Estate. Shri Hodal Shah Rao founded Koshad village as part of the Bhadawar State. During 1692, descendants of Shri Himmat Singh Bhadauria settled in Kharik village, eldest son of Shri Himmat Singh Bhadauria, Kallu Singh Bhadauria, got Shirkhipur village to commemorate victory over Gohad in 1708. Shri Kallu Singh Bhadauria was part of Maharajadhiraj Maharaj Mahendra Gopal Singh troops which taken over the Gohad Fort defeating Rana Bhim Singh. Sarokihipura was also called "Gohlaari" here is a famous "talaiya"

== Geography ==
Sarokihipura has the river Chambal at one side and the river Yamuna on the other. The soil here is very fertile and main crops are wheat, bajra, channa and mustard.

== Transport to Sarokhipura ==
Sarokhipura is located approximately 3 km east of Jaitpur along the road to Etawah, within the administrative vicinity of Bah and Agra.

== Education ==
The village has a government funded Primary School, which was established in the 2004 This Co-Educational Hindi medium school is managed by State Department of Education. For Poor students Scholarships are available at this school.

Established in 1964, P. P. Sarokhipura is a co-educational school located in the rural area of JAITPUR KALAN block in the AGRA district of Uttar Pradesh. Managed by the Department of Education, the school provides education from Grades 1 to 5 with Hindi being the medium of instruction. The academic session starts in April and the school is approachable by an all-weather road.

The school is housed in a government building which consists of four classrooms for instructional purposes, all of which are in good condition. In addition, there are two other rooms for non-teaching activities, a separate room for the Headmaster/Teacher and a library with 70 books. The school also has a playground and is provided with mid-day meals prepared on the school premises.

Although the school has an under-construction boundary wall, it does not have an electric connection. The source of drinking water in the school is from functional hand pumps. The school has functional separate toilets for boys and girls but does not have a ramp for disabled children to access classrooms. Furthermore, the school does not have any computers for teaching and learning purposes nor does it have a computer aided learning lab.
