= Jarar =

Village in Uttar Pradesh, India

Jarar is a village in Bah Tehsil in Agra District, Uttar Pradesh, India. It belongs to Agra Division. It is located 70 km towards the east from district headquarters Agra. 2 km from Bah. 276 km from state capital Lucknow. Hindi is the predominant language spoken.

Jarar Pin code is 283104 and postal head office is Bah.

Famous holi place Bateshwar is 13 km from Jarar.

Bah is nearby railway station.
