= Chhai Pokhar =

- Location in Uttar Pradesh, India Chhai Pokhar (India)
- Coordinates: 27°13′12″N 77°44′10″E
- Country: India
- State: Uttar Pradesh
- District: Agra
- Elevation: 168 m (551 ft)

Population (2011)
  - Total: 2,866

Languages
  - Official: Hindi
- Time zone: UTC+5:30 (IST)
- Postal code: 283101
- Vehicle registration: UP 80

Chhai Pokhar (or Chah Pokhar/ Chhah Pokhar) is a village in the district of Agra in the Indian state of Uttar Pradesh. It is nearby Achhnera or Achnera, connected by road on three sides of the village and by rail. Khera Sandhan is the nearest railway station at about 1 km from the village on Agra- Achnera-Mathura section of NW Railway. It is also known as Three Towers' Village.

== Geography and transportation ==
Chhai Pokhar is located at 27.22°N 77.736°E, with an average elevation of 168 meters (551 feet). The village is situated near the River Yamuna (locally pronounced as Jamuna), approximately 15 km away. It falls under Tehsil Kiraoli.

== Village government ==
Chhai Pokhar is governed by a Sarpanch (village head) elected by the villagers, who is responsible for the administration of the village.

== Demographics ==
According to the 2011 census the village had a total population of 3,577, 1,906 males and 1,671 females.

There were 556 children aged 0-6 years in 2011, approximately 43.2% of them female.

The literacy rate was 66.04% (the average literacy rate in Uttar Pradesh is 67.68%) with a male literacy rate of 75.52 and a female literacy rate of 55.14%, 1,442 literate males and 922 literate females.

Scheduled Castes constituting 22.70% of the total population, and Scheduled Tribes making up 0.03%. The majority of the villagers belong to the Other Backward Classes category, which make up 77.27% of the population.

Agriculture is economically important, with 335 cultivators (303 men and 32 women) and 316 agricultural laborers (258 men and 58 women). The village produces wheat, rice, and sugarcane.

== Agriculture ==
Agricultural is the primary economic activity, mainly producing wheat, mustard (or rapeseed), potato and other vegetables. Rice has been raised since the introduction of deep bore-wells. Sub-soil water is the main source of irrigation.

== Tourism ==
=== Nearby visitor attractions ===
- Fatehpur Sikri, approx 22 km by road
- Taj Mahal, 35 km by road and rail
- Agra Fort, 33 km by road and rail
- Keoladeo National Park (bird sanctuary), Bharatpur, Rajasthan, 30 km by road and rail
- Mathura, 32 km by road and rail
- Vrindavan, 36 km by road and rail
- Govardhan, 52 km by road

== Education ==
Chhai Pokhar has a government primary school and a junior high school and private schools. There is no high school in the village.
