= Digrauta =

- Village
- Location in Uttar Pradesh, India Digrauta (India)
- Coordinates: 27.01°N 77.89°E
- Country: India
- State: Uttar Pradesh
- District: Agra
- Time zone: UTC+5:30 (IST)
- Vehicle registration: UP
- Website: up.gov.in

Digrauta is a village in Uttar Pradesh state of India. It is located in the Agra district, and comes under the administration of Kheragarh panchayat. The population of the village is around 5000. The nearest major city is Agra (30 km).
