= Tarrakpur =

Village in Uttar Pradesh, India

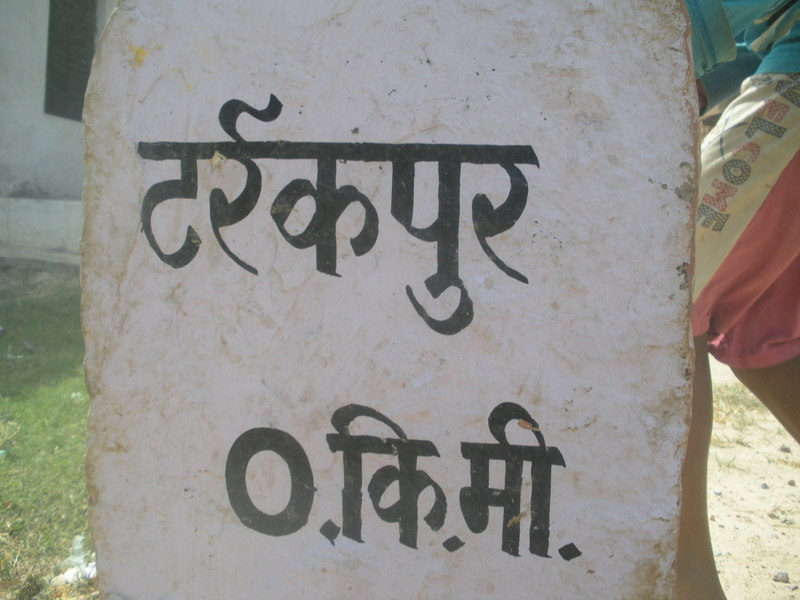
tarrakpur village agra near Nh93 & yamna expressway

Tarrakpur is a village near NH 93 in the Agra district of Uttar Pradesh, India. Tarrakpur comes under Etmadpur tehsil of Agra district, and is in the Gramsabha Poiya, which contains around twelve villages and a post office. This village comes under the Khandoli Block.

Pin Code:- 283126
