= Meoli =

Village in Jagner block, Agra district, India

Mewali (Village ID 124909) is an Indian village in Jagner block in Agra district. According to the 2011 census it has a population of 2333 living in 390 households.
