= National Highway 321 (India) =

National Highway in India

National Highway 321
- Map of National Highway 321 in red

Route information
- Auxiliary route of NH 21
- Length: 15 km (9.3 mi)

Major junctions
- North end: Kiraoli
- South end: Kagarol

Location
- Country: India
- States: Uttar Pradesh

Highway system
- Roads in India; Expressways; National; State; Asian
← NH 21	→ NH 321

National Highway 321, commonly referred to as NH 321 is a national highway in India. It is a spur road of National Highway 21. NH-321 runs in the state of Uttar Pradesh in India.

== Route ==
NH321 connects Kiraoli, Mori, Vamanpura, Jaingara and Kagarol in the state of Uttar Pradesh.

== Junctions ==
NH 21 Terminal near Kiraoli.

== See also ==
- List of national highways in India
- List of national highways in India by state
