= Ram Pratap Singh =

Indian politician

Member of Parliament, Rajya Sabha
- Incumbent
- Assumed office 26 October 2026
- Preceded by: Dinesh Sharma (politician)

MLA, 17th Legislative Assembly
- In office 2017–2022
- Constituency: Etmadpur, Agra district

Personal details
- Born: Agra, Uttar Pradesh
- Party: Bharatiya Janata Party
- Children: 2
- Parent: Yoginder Singh
- Education: Dr. Bhimrao Ambedkar University
- Occupation: MLA
- Profession: Politician

Ram Pratap Singh is an Indian politician is a Member of Parliament Rajya Sabha and former member of 17th Legislative Assembly of Etmadpur, Agra, Uttar Pradesh of India. He represents the Etmadpur constituency of Uttar Pradesh. He is a member of the Bharatiya Janata Party.

== Political career ==
Singh has been a member of the 17th Legislative Assembly of Uttar Pradesh. Since 2017, he has represented the Etmadpur constituency and is a member of the BJP. Also ex State Secretary BJP UP.

== Posts held ==
| # | From | To | Position | Comments |
|---|---|---|---|---|
| 01 | 2017 | 2022 | Member, 17th Legislative Assembly | |

== See also ==
- Uttar Pradesh Legislative Assembly
