= Garhi Udairaj =

- village
- Location in Uttar Pradesh, India Garhi Udairaj (India)
- Coordinates: 27.1667859°N 78.042495°E
- Country: India
- State: Uttar Pradesh
- District: Agra

Languages
  - Official: Hindi, Urdu
- Time zone: UTC+5:30 (IST)

Garhi Udairaj is a village located in the Fatehabad block of the Agra District in Uttar Pradesh.
