= Dhimsiri =

Dhimishiri (धीमिश्री)
- Village
- Location in Uttar Pradesh, India Dhimishiri (India)
- Coordinates: 27.02457°N 78.19118°E
- Country: India
- State: Uttar Pradesh
- District: Agra
- Postal code: 283125
- ISO 3166 code: IN-UP
- Website: up.gov.in

Dhimishiri is a village in Uttar Pradesh, India. It is located within the Agra district, the Fatehabad block, and the Dhimsiri Panchayat. It is about 25 km from Agra.
