= Bah Municipal Council =

Nagar Palika Prishad Bah
- Municipalities of India
- Interactive map of Nagar Palika Prishad Bah
- Coordinates: 26.52°N 78.35°E
- Country: India
- State: Uttar Pradesh
- District: Agra

Government
  - Type: Local Governance
- Elevation: 160 m (520 ft)

Population (2001)
  - Total: 132,072

Languages
  - Official: Hindi
- Time zone: UTC+5:30 (IST)
- Website: nppbah.com

Nagar Palika Parishad Bah is an institution of local governance comprising three blocks: Bah, Jaitpur and Pinahat. A Nagar Palika or municipality is an urban local body that administers a city. Nagar Palika is a municipality of Bah, Agra, Uttar Pradesh, India. Nagar Palika is constituted as per the provisions in the Constitution of India (74th Amendment) Act, 1992.

Bah is also the birthplace of Jitendra Tripathi 'Hemu', chairman of 'Mother Vision India Group'. He is a native of village Gadhiya Pratap Pura under Jaitpur police station of Bah tehsil.

== Functions ==
The Nagar Palika is responsible for

1. Water supply
2. Hospitals
3. Roads
4. Street lighting
5. Drainage
6. Fire brigade
7. Market places
8. Records of births and deaths
9. Solid waste management

== Sources of income ==
Its sources of income are taxes on water, houses, markets, entertainment and vehicles paid by residents of the town and grants from the state government.
