= Fatehabad, Uttar Pradesh Assembly constituency =

Constituency of the Uttar Pradesh legislative assembly in India

Fatehabad (फतेहाबाद)
- Constituency No. 93 for the Uttar Pradesh Legislative Assembly

Constituency details
- Country: India
- Region: North India
- State: Uttar Pradesh
- District: Agra
- Total electors: 427320 (2022)
- Reservation: None

Member of Legislative Assembly
- 18th Uttar Pradesh Legislative Assembly
- Incumbent Vacant
- Elected year: 2022

Fatehabad Assembly constituency is one of the 403 constituencies of the Uttar Pradesh Legislative Assembly, India. It is a part of the Agra district and one of the five assembly constituencies in the Fatehpur Sikri Lok Sabha constituency. First election in this assembly constituency was held in 1957 after the "DPACO (1956)" (delimitation order) was passed in 1956. After the "Delimitation of Parliamentary and Assembly Constituencies Order" was passed in 2008, the constituency was assigned identification number 93.

== Wards / Areas ==
Extent of Fatehabad Assembly constituency is Fatehabad Tehsil.

== Members of the Legislative Assembly ==
| From | Term | Name | Party |
|---|---|---|---|
| 1952 | 01st Vidhan Sabha | Constituency not in existence | |
| 1957 | 02nd Vidhan Sabha | Laxmi Narain Bansal | Indian National Congress |
| 1962 | 03rd Vidhan Sabha | Banwari Lal Pipra | Republican Party of India |
| 1967 | 04th Vidhan Sabha | Hukam Singh Parihar | Samyukta Socialist Party |
| 1969 | 05th Vidhan Sabha | Hukam Singh Parihar | Samyukta Socialist Party |
| 1974 | 06th Vidhan Sabha | Rajendra Prasad Doneria | Indian National Congress |
| 1977 | 07th Vidhan Sabha | Hukam Singh Parihar | Janata Party |
| 1980 | 08th Vidhan Sabha | Mahesh Upadhyaya | Indian National Congress (I) |
| 1985 | 09th Vidhan Sabha | Amitab Lavania | Indian National Congress |
| 1989 | 10th Vidhan Sabha | Bahadur Singh | Janata Dal |
| 1991 | 11th Vidhan Sabha | Vijay Pal Singh | Janata Dal |
| 1993 | 12th Vidhan Sabha | Chotelal Verma | Bharatiya Janata Party |
| 1996 | 13th Vidhan Sabha | Vijay Pal Singh | Janata Dal |
| 2002 | 14th Vidhan Sabha | Chotelal Verma | Bharatiya Janata Party |
| 2007 | 15th Vidhan Sabha | Rajendra Singh | Bharatiya Janata Party |
| 2012 | 16th Vidhan Sabha | Chotelal Verma | Bahujan Samaj Party |
| 2017 | 17th Vidhan Sabha | Jitendra Verma | Bharatiya Janata Party |
| 2022 | 18th Vidhan Sabha | Chotelal Verma | Bharatiya Janata Party |

== Election results ==
=== 2027 ===
2027 Uttar Pradesh Legislative Assembly election: Fatehabad
| Party | Candidate | Votes | % | ±% |
|---|---|---|---|---|
| INDIA | | | | |
| NDA | | | | |
| BSP | | | | |
| NOTA | None of the above | | | |
| Majority | | | | |
| Turnout | | | | |
| gain from | | Swing | | |

=== 2022 ===
2022 Uttar Pradesh Legislative Assembly election: Fatehabad
| Party | Candidate | Votes | % | ±% |
|---|---|---|---|---|
| BJP | Chotelal Verma | 108,811 | 50.46 | +1.86 |
| SP | Rupali Dixit | 55,576 | 25.77 | −6.45 |
| BSP | Shailendra Singh | 40,958 | 18.99 | +2.28 |
| Jan Adhikar Party | Rajesh Singh Kushwah | 3,585 | 1.66 | |
| NOTA | None of the above | 2,472 | 1.15 | +0.44 |
| Majority | | 53,235 | 24.69 | +8.31 |
| Turnout | | 215,626 | 66.86 | −3.65 |
| BJP hold | | Swing | | |

=== 2017 ===
2017 Uttar Pradesh Legislative Assembly election: Fatehabad
| Party | Candidate | Votes | % | ±% |
|---|---|---|---|---|
| BJP | Jitendra Verma | 101,960 | 48.6 | |
| SP | Rajendra Singh | 67,596 | 32.22 | |
| BSP | Umesh Sharma | 35,050 | 16.71 | |
| NOTA | None of the above | 1,470 | 0.71 | |
| Majority | | 34,364 | 16.38 | |
| Turnout | | 209,793 | 70.51 | |
| Bhartiya Janta Party gain from BSP | | Swing | | |

=== 2012 ===
2012 General Elections: Fatehabad
| Party | Candidate | Votes | % | ±% |
|---|---|---|---|---|
| BSP | Chotelal Verma | 73,098 | 39.7 | − |
| SP | Rajendra Singh | 72,399 | 39.32 | − |
| BJP | Giraj Singh Kushwaha | 20,502 | 11.13 | − |
| | Remainder 9 candidates | 18,136 | 9.85 | − |
| Majority | | 699 | 0.38 | − |
| Turnout | | 184,135 | 69.53 | − |
| BSP gain from BJP | | Swing | | |

== See also ==
- Agra district
- Fatehpur Sikri Lok Sabha constituency
- Sixteenth Legislative Assembly of Uttar Pradesh
- Uttar Pradesh Legislative Assembly
- Vidhan Bhawan
