= Rudhmuli =

- Village
- Location in Uttar Pradesh, India
- Coordinates: 26.91°N 78.59°E
- Country: India
- State: Uttar Pradesh
- District: Agra

Government
  - Body: Gram panchayat
- Elevation: 146 m (479 ft)

Population (2011)
  - Total: 1,445

Languages
  - Official: Hindi
- Time zone: UTC+5:30 (IST)
- PIN: 283104

Rudhmuli is a village in Bah Tehsil of Agra District of Uttar Pradesh in India.

== Demographics ==
As of 2011 India census, Rudhmuli follows the same statistics as of Bah [Nearest Town having 2011 census statistics]. Rudhmuli had a population of 1,445. The Male population is 734 and female population is 711.15% of the population is under six years of age. Pincode for Rudhmuli is 283104 and STD code is 05614.

== Overview ==
It is around 71.8 km from Agra city and around 59 km from Etawah district. It was founded in early 19th century by Shri Angad singh Bhadoria of Bhadawar state.

Rudhmuli is near the famous Bateshwarnath Temple (Lord Shiva). November local festival at Bateshwarnath attracts thousands of devotees from nearby areas and states ( Rajasthan & Madhya Pradesh).

It is situated on the Bank of Yamuna River and most of the land in village is not Plain. In old times, the Village was controlled by the Bhadoria Rulers nominated by the King of Bhadawar state.
