= Baadrayal =

Baadrayal Badhrayal
- Village
- Location in Rajasthan, India
- Coordinates: 26°36′0″N 76°54′0″E
- Country: India
- State: Rajasthan
- District: Sawai Madhopur

Languages
  - Official: Hindi
- Time zone: UTC+5:30 (IST)
- PIN: 322220
- ISO 3166 code: RJ-IN
- Vehicle registration: RJ25
- Nearest city: Gangapur City, Sawai Madhopur

Baadrayal or Badhrayal is a village in Gangapur City, Sawai Madhopur district in the state of Rajasthan, India. Baadrayal is located near to the main railway line from Delhi to Mumbai, accessed via Kota on the rail path from New Delhi.

The nearest airport is Sanganer Airport in Jaipur and the nearest railway stations are Shri Mahabirji railway station and Khandip railway station. Most of the area in the village is used for agriculture. The whole village is dependent on ground water as its only source of water. The village is known in nearby areas for a temple, Dhuni. The nearby villages are Rendayal, Gujar, Mohcha Ka Pura, and Nayagaon.

== Water ==
Most of the resources are Deep Tubewells which are dependent on ground water. Baadrayal is also the part of chambal SawaiMadhopur nadauti project SawaiMadhopur baler schemes.
