= Azizpur =

- Census town
- Location in Uttar Pradesh, India Azizpur (India)
- Coordinates: 26°58′35″N 79°13′17″E
- Country: India
- State: Uttar Pradesh
- District: Agra

Population (2011)
  - Total: 11,103

Language
  - Official: Hindi
  - Additional official: Urdu
- Time zone: UTC+5:30 (IST)
- Vehicle registration: UP
- Website: up.gov.in

Azizpur is a census town in Agra district in the state of Uttar Pradesh, India.

== Demographics ==
As of 2011 Indian Census, Azizpur had a total population of 11,103, of which 6,049 were males and 5,054 were females. Population within the age group of 0 to 6 years was 1,858. The total number of literates in Azizpur was 5,982, which constituted 53.9% of the population with male literacy of 62.8% and female literacy of 43.2%. The effective literacy rate of 7+ population of Azizpur was 64.7%, of which male literacy rate was 75.1% and female literacy rate was 52.1%. The Scheduled Castes and Scheduled Tribes population was 4,789 and 1 respectively. Azizpur had 1727 households in 2011.

As of 2001 India census, Azizpur had a population of 10,008. Males constitute 54% of the population and females 46%. Azizpur has an average literacy rate of 41%, lower than the national average of 59.5%; with 67% of the males and 33% of females literate. 20% of the population is under 6 years of age.
