= Ram Sakal Gurjar =

Indian businessman and politician

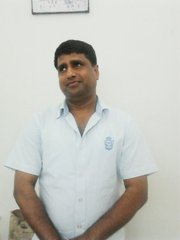

Minister of State for Programme Implementation, Sports and Youth welfare (Independent Charge)
- In office 2012–2013
- Succeeded by: Chetan Chauhan
- Constituency: Uttar Pradesh

Member of the Uttar Pradesh Legislative Council
- In office 2012–2018

Personal details
- Born: Ram Sakal Gurjar; 11/07/1969 Fatehabad, Agra district
- Party: Bharatiya Janata Party
- Other political affiliations: Samajwadi Party
- Children: Tejendra Gurjar, Madhu Gurjar
- Education: Agra University
- Occupation: Agriculture
- Profession: Business

Ram Sakal Gurjar is an Indian businessman and politician from Agra district in Uttar Pradesh. He is a former Minister of State for Programme Implementation and Minister of State (Independent charge) for Sports and Youth Welfare in Samajwadi Party government (2012–17). In April 2019 he joined Bharatiya Janata Party (BJP) . With his immense popularity in Western Uttar Pradesh he is seen as a great influential leader in whole Western UP. Ram Sakal Gurjar is a member of the Bharatiya Janata Party, representing the Agra district of Uttar Pradesh.
