= Chamrauli, Barauli Ahir =

Village in Uttar Pradesh, India

Chamrauli is a village in Barauli Ahir block of Agra District in Uttar Pradesh. The block headquarter Barauli Ahir is located at distance of 1.6 km. Agra is at a distance of 8 km from village.

The nearest railway station to Chamrauli is Agra Fort which is located in and around 6.3 kilometer distance. The Pin Code of village is 283125. The village has higher secondary school.
