= Nainana Jat =

- Census town
- Location in Uttar Pradesh, India
- Coordinates: 27°07′15″N 77°59′45″E
- Country: India
- State: Uttar Pradesh
- District: Agra

Population (2011)
  - Total: 12,941

Language
  - Official: Hindi
  - Additional official: Urdu
- Time zone: UTC+5:30 (IST)

Nainana Jat is a census town in Agra district in the Indian state of Uttar Pradesh.

== Demographics ==
Jats village.As of 2011 Indian Census, Nainana Jat had a total population of 12,941, of which 6,720 were males and 6,221 were females. Population within the age group of 0 to 6 years was 2,398. The total number of literates in Nainana Jat was 5,801, which constituted 44.8% of the population with male literacy of 53.0% and female literacy of 36.0%. The effective literacy rate of 7+ population of Nainana Jat was 55.0%, of which male literacy rate was 64.9% and female literacy rate was 44.3%. The Scheduled Castes and Scheduled Tribes population was 8,222 and 2 respectively. Nainana Jat had 2172 households in 2011.

As of 2001 India census, Nainana Jat had a population of 9,650. Males constitute 54% of the population and females 46%. Nainana Jat has an average literacy rate of 38%, lower than the national average of 59.5%: male literacy is 47%, and female literacy is 26%. In Nainana Jat, 23% of the population is under 6 years of age. it is town of Jats.
