= Gambhir River (Rajasthan) =

Gambhir River Utangan River
- Interactive Map Yamuna River (shown in saffron) and Gambhir River (shown in red)

Location
- Country: India

Physical characteristics
- Source: Karauli, Rajasthan
- Mouth: Yamuna
  - coordinates: 26°59′00″N 78°26′49″E

Basin features
- Tributaries
  - left: Banganga, Sesa, Kher, Churaho, Parbati
- Waterbodies: Khandip Dam

The Gambhir River, also known as the Utangan River, is an ephemeral (seasonal) river in India which originates in Rajasthan state and confluences with Yamuna near Jalalpur in Uttar Pradesh state. Important tributaries of the Gambhir are Banganga, Sesa, Kher, Churaho and Parbati.

It originates near Karoli in Rajasthan and flows around Hindaun City, then through Bharatpur district, and through Dholpur district where it forms the boundary between Uttar Pradesh and Rajasthan states. It then enters Agra district of Uttar Pradesh to finally confluence with Yamuna.

It supplies water to the Keoladeo National Park near Bharatpur in Rajasthan.

== Basin ==
=== Origin ===
It originates from Karauli in Rajasthan and flows around Hindaun City. It flows from south to north up to Kanjoli-Katara Aziz village (Toda Bhim), then towards northeast up to village Mertha of Roopbas Block, before entering Uttar Pradesh. The river again enters Rajasthan near Catchapaura village in Dholpur District and forms the boundary between UP and Rajasthan. It then enters Mainpuri District in UP to finally joins River Yamuna. It flows between the city of Bayana and Brahmbad Village in the Bharatpur district.

=== Drainage ===
Banganga's tributary Sanwan after converging with Tildah river then converges with Banganga River, Banganga then converges with the Gambhir river (also known as the Utang river). Gambhir enters the state of Uttar Pradesh and forms the border of Tehsils (Sub-divisions) of Bah and Fatehabad. Gambhir then converges with the Yamuna in Agra district of Uttar Pradesh, Yamuna converges with Ganges at Triveni Sangam in Allahabad.

== Issues and conservation ==
Previously a perennial river, it has now become seasonal due to over-exploitation of water resources, lack of conservation actions and climate change. Since it is also the lifeline for the Keoladeo National Park, its conservation is urgently needed.

== Meghadootam ==
Kalidasa in his poem "Meghadootam" beautifully describes the river Gambhira. There the poet said to Megha, "She is eager to receive you, so do not look away from her. Don't pick up the rest of her watery clothes, which by default are skinny and like handcuffs that are like riverbanks." It can be read as a temporary river status.

== See also ==
- Sahibi River
- List of rivers of Rajasthan
- List of rivers of India
