= Jaitpura Kalan =

Jaitpur Kalan
- city
- Location in Uttar Pradesh, India Jaitpur Kalan (India)
- Coordinates: 26.49°N 78.41°E
- Country: India
- State: Uttar Pradesh
- District: Agra
- Founder: Maharaja Jait Singh Bhadauria
- Elevation: 147 m (482 ft)

Languages
  - Official: Hindi
- Time zone: UTC+5:30 (IST)
- Postal code: 283114
- Vehicle registration: UP 80
- Website: up.gov.in

Jaitpur Kalan is a block in Bah tehsil of Agra district in Uttar Pradesh, India. Jaitpur kalan was founded by Maharaja Mahendra Jait Singh Bhadauria (1427-1464) of Bhadawar. Hindi is the main language spoken here while the main religion practiced is Hinduism. It also has a considerable Muslim and Jain population. Nagar Palika Parishad Bah looks after the sanitation, development and public recreation of the area. Jaitpur kalan is also birthplace of Jitendra Tripathi 'Hemu' Chairman of 'Mother Vision India Group'.
