= Saiyan =

Saiyan may refer to:

- Saiyan, a fictional extraterrestrial race in the Dragon Ball media franchise
- Saiyan (film), a 1951 Bollywood film
- Ryan Danford (born 1985) also known as "Saiyan", American semi-professional Halo player
- Saiyan, Agra, a village in the Agra district of Uttar Pradesh, India
- "Saiyan", a song by Stray Kids from Giant
