= Khandauli =

- Census town
- Location in Uttar Pradesh, India
- Coordinates: 27°18′45″N 78°1′44″E
- Country: India
- State: Uttar Pradesh
- District: Agra

Population (2011)
  - Total: 8,625

Languages
  - Official: Hindi
- Time zone: UTC+5:30 (IST)
- Postal code: 283104

Khandauli is a census town in Agra district of Uttar Pradesh in India.
