= Genda Lal Dixit =

Indian revolutionary

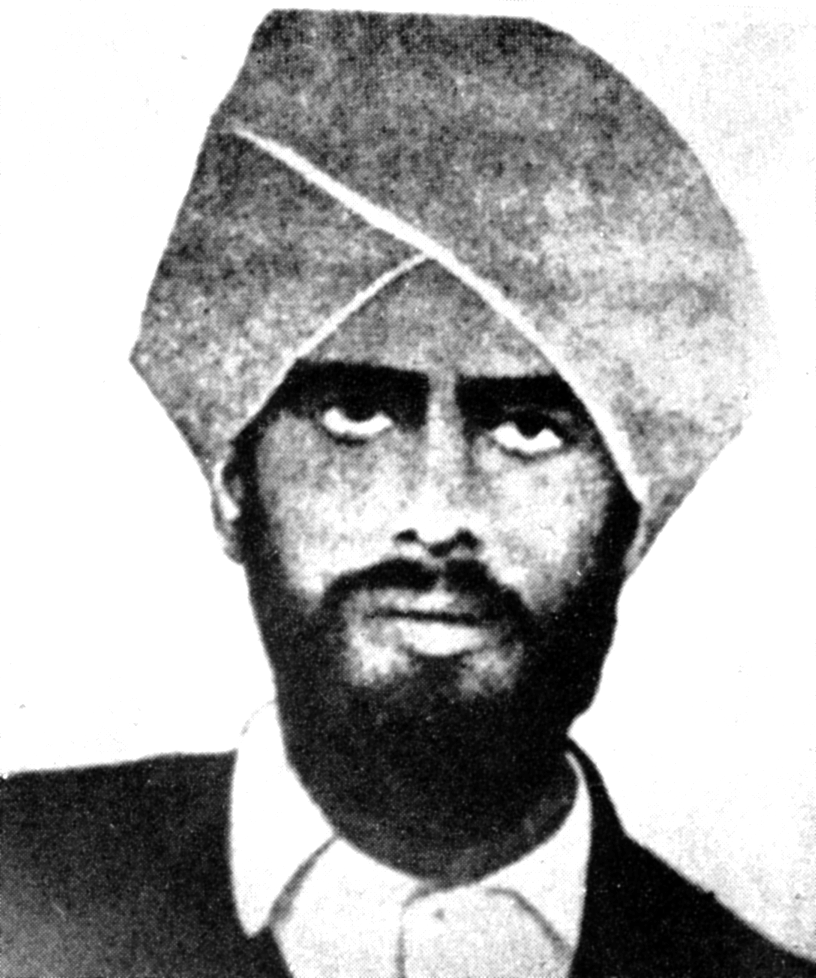
- Genda Lal Dixit
- Born: 30 November 1888; Agra, United Provinces, British India (Present day Agra, Uttar Pradesh, India)
- Died: 21 December 1920 (aged 32); New Delhi, British India (Present day New Delhi, India)
- Organization(s): Śivājī Samiti; Mātṛvedī Dal
- Known for: Mainpuri Conspiracy
- Movement: Indian Independence Movement

Genda Lal Dixit (30 November 1888 – 21 December 1920) was an Indian revolutionary who worked as a school-teacher at Auraiya in the district of Etawah, United Provinces, British India. He led a group of Indian freedom fighters (revolutionaries), known as the Shivaji Samiti, who engaged in subversive activities against the British Raj. As a consequence of their involvement in the Mainpuri Conspiracy of 1918, Dixit was arrested and imprisoned first at Agra fort and later at Mainpuri. He managed to escape from prison with the help of Pandit Dev Narayan Bhartiya and latter died on 21 December 1920 in a government hospital at Delhi.

Dixit was associated with Ram Prasad Bismil.

== Early life ==
Genda Lal Dixit was born on 30 November 1888 in Bah tehsil of Agra district in the United Province in a Kanyakubja Brahmin family. His father's name was Bhola Nath Dixit. His mother died when he was around three years old.

After completing his primary education in his native village, he attended the Government High School in Etawah and later matriculated from Agra. He became a teacher in the DAV School Auraiya, United Province.

== Revolutionary activities ==
When Lord Curzon, the Viceroy of British India, ordered the partition of Bengal, the Swadeshi Movement arose throughout the country. Dixit read newspaper articles written in protest by Bal Gangadhar Tilak and was inspired to emulate in the United Provinces the celebrations of Shivaji Utsav held in Maharashtra. He took leave from his job and travelled to the nearby princely state of Gwalior, where the populace was sympathetic to the idea of independence from British rule. There, he encouraged young people to support the movement and take up arms.

Dixit established the Shivaji Samiti as a means of advancing these objectives. Initially, the organisation was involved in distributing seditious literature, but Dixit saw an opportunity to unite the dacoits of the region and proposed doing so at meetings held in the Bhind and Morena districts of Central Provinces. He encouraged the dacoits to participate in guerrilla warfare by recounting stories of Shivaji, the Maratha leader who had employed similar tactics during the reign of the Mughal emperor Aurangzeb. The dacoits raised funds for the venture through a series of robberies in rural areas of Agra and Gwalior.

The guidance of Dixit was later sought by Ram Prasad Bismil, a fellow revolutionary who had established his own organisation, the Matrivedi ("Altar of the Motherland"), in Shahjahanpur, United Provinces. The organisation was founded and managed by Pandit Dev Narayan 'Bhartiye'. The two men were introduced by Somdev, who believed that Bismil's effectiveness would be enhanced by the support of a more experienced revolutionary. A period of collaboration followed.

On 28 January 1918, Bismil published a pamphlet titled Deshvasiyon Ke Nam Sandesh ("A Message to Countrymen") and distributed it among the public along with his poem Mainpuri Ki Pratigya ("Vow of Mainpuri"). In 1918, three further looting raids were carried out to raise funds. Meanwhile, the police searched for the revolutionaries in and around Mainpuri while they were selling books proscribed by the U.P. Government during the annual session of the Indian National Congress, held in Delhi that year.

When the police located them, Bismil fled with the unsold books. While he was planning another looting raid between Delhi and Agra, a police team arrived, and firing broke out on both sides. Bismil evaded capture by jumping into the Yamuna and swimming underwater. The police and his companions believed that he had been killed in the encounter. Dixit, however, was arrested along with several of his companions and detained in Agra Fort.

Bismil later met Dixit in the fort, where they planned an escape. Dixit was subsequently taken to Mainpuri, where a criminal case, known as the Mainpuri Conspiracy, was brought against members of Matrivedi. Dixit offered to provide information about the robberies in the United Provinces and gained the confidence of the police, who placed him in custody with the Matrivedi youths. He subsequently escaped from the police jail in Mainpuri and fled to Delhi, where he remained undetected until his death. On 1 November 1919, the Judiciary Magistrate of Mainpuri delivered the judgment against the accused and declared Dixit and Bismil to be absconders.

== Death ==
Dixit died in hospital, having contracted tuberculosis.

His biography was written by Ram Prasad Bismil which was published in the Hindi magazine Prabha from Kanpur (issue of 3 September 1924) with the pen name of 'Agyat'.
