= Etmadpur Assembly constituency =

Constituency of the Uttar Pradesh legislative assembly in India

Etmadpur एत्मादपुर
- Constituency No. 86 for the Uttar Pradesh Legislative Assembly

Constituency details
- Country: India
- Region: North India
- State: Uttar Pradesh
- District: Agra
- Established: 1956
- Total electors: 4,32,010 (2019)
- Reservation: None

Member of Legislative Assembly
- 18th Uttar Pradesh Legislative Assembly
- Incumbent Dharampal Singh
- Party: Bharatiya Janata Party

Etmadpur Assembly constituency is one of the 403 constituencies of the Uttar Pradesh Legislative Assembly, India. It is a part of the Agra district and one of the five assembly constituencies in the Agra Lok Sabha constituency. First election in this assembly constituency was held in 1957 after the "DPACO (1956)" (delimitation order) was passed in 1956. After the "Delimitation of Parliamentary and Assembly Constituencies Order" was passed in 2008, the constituency was assigned identification number 86.

== Wards / Areas ==
Extent of Etmadpur Assembly constituency is Etmadpur Tehsil; Ward Nos. 12, 17, 19, 28, 59, 61 & 73 in Agra (M Corp.) of Agra Tehsil.

== Members of the Legislative Assembly ==
#	Term	Name	Party	From	To	Days	Comments	Ref
01	01st Vidhan Sabha	Ram chandra sehra	Indian National Congress	May-1952	Mar-1957	1,776	Constituency not in existence	
02	02nd Vidhan Sabha	Ganga Dhar	Indian National Congress	Apr-1957	Mar-1962	1,800	-	
03	03rd Vidhan Sabha	-	-	Mar-1962	Mar-1967	1,828	Constituency not in existence	
04	04th Vidhan Sabha	-	-	Mar-1967	Apr-1968	402	Constituency not in existence	
05	05th Vidhan Sabha	-	-	Feb-1969	Mar-1974	1,832	Constituency not in existence	
06	06th Vidhan Sabha	Shiv Charan Lal	Bharatiya Kranti Dal	Mar-1974	Apr-1977	1,153	-	
07	07th Vidhan Sabha	Chandra Bhan Maurya	Janata Party	Jun-1977	Feb-1980	969	-	
08	08th Vidhan Sabha	Maharaj Singh	Indian National Congress (I)	Jun-1980	Mar-1985	1,735	-	
09	09th Vidhan Sabha	Chandra Bhan Maurya	Lok Dal	Mar-1985	Nov-1989	1,725	-	
10	10th Vidhan Sabha	Chandra Bhan Maurya	Janata Dal	Dec-1989	Apr-1991	488	-	
11	11th Vidhan Sabha	Chandra Bhan Maurya	Janata Dal	Jun-1991	Dec-1992	533	-	
12	12th Vidhan Sabha	Chandra Bhan Maurya	Samajwadi Party	Dec-1993	Oct-1995	693	-	
13	13th Vidhan Sabha	Ganga Prasad Pushkar	Bahujan Samaj Party	Oct-1996	May-2002	1,967	-	
14	14th Vidhan Sabha	Ganga Prasad Pushkar	Rashtriya Lok Dal	Feb-2002	May-2007	1,902	-	
15	15th Vidhan Sabha	Narayan Singh	Bahujan Samaj Party	May-2007	Mar-2012	1,762	-	
16	16th Vidhan Sabha	Dharampal Singh	Bahujan Samaj Party	Mar-2012	Mar-2017	-	-	
17	17th Vidhan Sabha	Ram Pratap Singh	Bharatiya Janata Party	Mar-2017	Mar-2022	-	-	-
18	18th Vidhan Sabha	Dharampal Singh	Bharatiya Janata Party	Mar-2022	Incumbent	-	-	-

== Election results ==
=== 2027 ===
2027 Uttar Pradesh Legislative Assembly election: Etmadpur
Party	Candidate	Votes	%	±%
INDIA				
NDA				
BSP	Sarvesh Baghel			
NOTA	None of the above			
Majority				
Turnout				
gain from		Swing		

=== 2022 ===
2022 Uttar Pradesh Legislative Assembly election: Etmadpur
Party	Candidate	Votes	%	±%
BJP	Dharmpal Singh	146,603	48.77	▲0.43
BSP	Praval Pratap Singh	98,679	32.83	▲1.12
SP	Virendra Singh Chauhan	48,642	16.18	▲0.72
NOTA	None of the above	1,891	0.63	▼0.03
Majority		47,924	15.94	▼0.69
Turnout		300,588	67.57	▼0.55
BJP hold				

=== 2017 ===
2017 Uttar Pradesh Legislative Assembly election: Etmadpur
Party	Candidate	Votes	%	±%
BJP	Ram Pratap Singh	137,381	48.34	
BSP	Dharampal Singh	90,126	31.71	
SP	Rajbeti Baghel	43,925	15.46	
RLD	Narendra Baghel	3,496	1.23	
NOTA	None of the above	1,872	0.66	
Majority		47,255	16.63	
Turnout		284,202	68.12	
BJP gain from BSP		Swing		

=== 2012 ===
2012 General Elections: Etmadpur
Party	Candidate	Votes	%	±%
BSP	Dharampal Singh	79,982	33.90	−
SP	Prem Singh Baghel	71,478	30.29	−
BJP	Ram Pratap Singh	50,098	21.23	−
	Remainder 12 candidates	34,405	14.56	−
Majority		8,504	3.61	−
Turnout		2,35,963	65.23	−
Registered electors				
BSP hold		Swing		

== See also ==
- Agra district
- Agra Lok Sabha constituency
- Sixteenth Legislative Assembly of Uttar Pradesh
- Uttar Pradesh Legislative Assembly
