= Akola, Agra =

Akola
- Interactive map of Akola
- Coordinates: 27°3′56″N 77°52′51″E
- Country: India
- State: Uttar Pradesh
- District: Agra

Population
  - Total: 11,351
- Time zone: UTC+5:30 (IST)
- PIN: 283102

Akola is a town in the Agra district of Uttar Pradesh, India, about 16 km from the district's main city of Agra. It is one of the 15 development blocks of Agra.

An Indian Air Force drop zone known widely for its large area is about 5 km away from the town. It has a sub-post office, covering many of the nearby villages.

Akola is known for its all over the state and its youth's obsession with sports and joining the armed forces. Akola is prominently known as Chaharwati by the name of Brajesh Chahar, who studied in Hansraj College of the University of Delhi.

Pradhahan( akola gram panchayat) - Shreemati Pooja Devi W/O Dr Gambhir singh chahar.
