= Parbati River, Karoli =

River in Rajasthan, India

Parbati River

Location
- Country: India
- State: Rajasthan

Physical characteristics
- Source
  - location: Chhawar village, Sapotara tehsil, Karauli district
- Mouth
  - location: Gambhir River, Dholpur district
  - coordinates: 25°51′N 76°34′E

Basin features
- Tributaries
  - right: Chopan, Barbati

The Parbati River is a river in northern India, originating from the hills of the village of Chhawar in the Sapotara tehsil of the Karauli district in Rajasthan. It flows through the mountains and eventually merges with the Gambhir River in the Dholpur district.

== Course ==
The Parbati River takes its source from the hills of Chhawar village, located in the Sapotara tehsil of the Karauli district.

The Parbati River is joined by two main tributaries – the Mendka and the Serani.

== Angai Dam ==
In the village of Angai, located in the Dholpur district, a dam has been constructed on the Parbati River. This dam is known by two names - the Angai Dam and the Parbati Dam. It serves various purposes, including water storage, irrigation, and flood control, significantly impacting the local landscape and ecology.

== Importance ==
The Parbati River and its tributaries play a crucial role in the local ecology and the livelihoods of the people residing along its course. The river and its associated dam facilitate agricultural activities in the region, contributing to the prosperity of the local communities.
