= Kagarol =

- Village
- Location in Uttar Pradesh, India Kagarol (India)
- Coordinates: 27°01′N 77°51′E
- Country: India
- State: Uttar Pradesh
- District: Agra
- Time zone: UTC+5:30 (IST)
- Vehicle registration: UP
- Website: up.gov.in

Kagarol is a village in the Agra district of Uttar Pradesh state in India. It is situated at a distance of about 25 kilometers to the south-west of Agra city. This village finds mention in some of the earliest Archaeological Survey of India reports compiled by Alexander Cunningham and his assistants, J. D. Beglar and A. C. L. Carlleyle.
