= Etmadpur =

- Town
- Location in Uttar Pradesh, India
- Coordinates: 27.23541°N 78.19829°E
- Country: India
- State: Uttar Pradesh
- District: Agra

Population (2011)
  - Total: 21,897

Language
  - Official: Hindi
  - Additional official: Urdu
- Time zone: UTC+5:30 (IST)
- Telephone code: 0562
- Vehicle registration: UP80

Etmadpur is a town (tehsil) in Agra district in the state of Uttar Pradesh, India. It is located eastward 19 km from Agra. It is 274 km far from state capital Lucknow.

== Demographics ==
As of 2011 Indian Census, Etmadpur had a total population of 21,897, of which 11,591 were males and 10,306 were females. Population within the age group of 0 to 6 years was 3,069. The total number of literates in Etmadpur was 14,161, which constituted 64.7% of the population with male literacy of 70.6% and female literacy of 58.0%. The effective literacy rate of 7+ population of Etmadpur was 75.2%, of which male literacy rate was 82.2% and female literacy rate was 67.4%. The Scheduled Castes and Scheduled Tribes population was 4,547 and 2 respectively. Etmadpur had 3,577 households in 2011.

As of 2001 India census, Etmadpur had a population of 19,412. Males constitute 53% of the population and females 47%. Etmadpur has an average literacy rate of 55%, lower than the national average of 59.5%: male literacy is 63%, and female literacy is 45%. In Etmadpur, 17% of the population is under 6 years of age.

== About the town ==
It is a small town located on national highway 2 connecting Delhi to Kolkata. The town is believed to be named after Mirza Ghiyas Beg the I'timād-ud-Daulah, a Mughal official, father of Nur Jahan and grandfather of Mumtaz Mahal.

Dharampal Singh of the Bhartiya Janta Party won the 2022 state assembly elections to become the MLA from Etmadpur.
