= Panchana Dam =

Man-made wetland in Rajasthan, India

- Location: Gudla village, Karauli district, Rajasthan
- Coordinates: 26.562704°N 77.004616°E
- Type: Freshwater man-made wetland
- Surface area: 10 square kilometres (3.9 sq mi)

Location
- Interactive map of Panchana Dam

Panchana Dam is a freshwater man-made wetland in Gudla village, Karauli district, Rajasthan, about 100 km southeast of Bharatpur. Positioned upstream of the Gambhir River at Krauli, water from this river is crucial for reaching Keoladeo National Park by September. Failure to release water could impact migratory bird visits to the park. The dam stores water from five rivers, supplying Krauli, Sawai Madhopur, and Bharatpur.

== Bird species ==
Panchana Dam is a habitat for various bird species, including:

- Little cormorant (55)
- Great cormorant (90)
- Darter
- Little egret
- Grey heron
- Large Egret
- Median Egret

== Globally threatened birds ==
The wetland hosts globally threatened birds, including:

- Near-Threatened: Darter, Oriental White ibis
- Vulnerable: Indian skimmer

== Threats ==
Commercial fishing poses a significant threat to waterfowls during foraging and resting activities. Up to 10 boats may be seen simultaneously in the wetland, impacting fish-catching activities. Fishing nets spread in water for catching fish also disturb water birds adversely.
