= Barara, Agra =

Indian village

Barara is a village located in Agra district, Uttar Pradesh, in India. In 2001, the population was 10,217 people with 5,507 males and 4,710 females.

Barara is the third largest village in Agra tehsil. It is designated as a tourist village and is about 2.5 km from Agra on the NH 11 (Agra-Fatehpur Sikri road). The village lies close to many historic sites, including Agra, Fatehpur Sikri, Bharatpur and Moradabad. In 1966 Shri Ramesh Chandra Singh went to USA on a 4-H scholarship and stayed there for more than 8 months. He bought with him new technology and knowledge and that is how agriculture in this village flourished. Since 1960 US delegates (4-H) used to stay in this village for a month or so and would enjoy rural India, later in 2016 his grandson Mohit Singh went to USA under the 4-H exchange program and introduced the high quality Kansas wheat to the village. The land in this village is quite fertile and one can see guava orchards, grape fruit trees, Indian gooseberry trees, and a fish pond.

The village was adopted by US president Bill Clinton in 2000 during his visit to the Taj Mahal in Agra. The village received heritage village status afterward.
