= Chotelal Verma =

Indian politician (1953–2026)

Chhotelal Verma

MLA, 16th Legislative Assembly
- In office March 2012 – March 2017
- Preceded by: Rajendra Singh
- Constituency: Fatehabad

MLA, 14th Legislative Assembly
- In office February 2002 – May 2007
- Preceded by: Vijay Pal Singh
- Succeeded by: Rajendra Singh
- Constituency: Fatehabad

MLA, 12th Legislative Assembly
- In office December 1993 – October 1995
- Preceded by: Vijay Pal Singh
- Succeeded by: Vijay Pal Singh
- Constituency: Fatehabad

Personal details
- Born: 7 July 1953 Agra district, Uttar Pradesh, India
- Died: 24 September 2026 (aged 73) Noida, Uttar Pradesh, India
- Party: Bharatiya Janata Party
- Other political affiliations: Bahujan Samaj Party
- Parent: Jangjeet Singh (father)
- Education: Janta Intermediate college
- Profession: Businessman, politician

Chhotelal Verma (7 July 1953 – 24 September 2026) was an Indian politician who was a member of the 18th Uttar Pradesh Assembly and also Sixteenth Legislative Assembly of Uttar Pradesh. He represented the Fatehabad constituency of Uttar Pradesh and was a member of the Bharatiya Janata Party, having previously been a member of the Bahujan Samaj Party until 2016.

== Early life and education ==
Chhotelal Verma was born in the Village Nagla Devhans of Agra district, on 7 July 1953. He attended the "Janta Intermediate college" and was educated till Sixth Standard.

== Political career ==
Verma was a MLA for three terms. He represented the Fatehabad constituency and was a member of the Bahujan Samaj Party political party. Verma was earlier a member of the Bharatiya Janata Party, and rejoined the BJP on 27 December 2016.

== Death ==
Verma died in Noida, Uttar Pradesh on 24 September 2026, at the age of 73.

== Posts held ==
| # | From | To | Position | Comments |
|---|---|---|---|---|
| 01 | 2022 | Incumbent | Member, 18th Legislative Assembly | |
| 02 | 2012 | 2017 | Member, 16th Legislative Assembly | |
| 03 | 2010 | 2010 | Chairman, State Minister Portfolio | |
| 04 | 2009 | 2009 | Voice Chairman, State Minister Portfolio- Voice Chairman Ram Ganga Kaman | |
| 05 | 2002 | 2007 | Member, 14th Legislative Assembly | |
| 06 | 1993 | 1995 | Member, 12th Legislative Assembly | |
