= Jitendra Verma =

Indian politician

MLA, 17th Legislative Assembly
- In office 2017–2021
- Constituency: Fatehabad, Agra, Uttar Pradesh

Personal details
- Born: Village- Vitthona, Bah, Agra
- Party: Bhartiya Janta Party
- Occupation: MLA
- Profession: Politician

Jitendra Verma is an Indian politician and a member of 17th Legislative Assembly, Uttar Pradesh of India. He represents the ‘Fatehabad’ constituency in Agra district of Uttar Pradesh. On January 23, 2022, he resigned from Bhartiya Janta Party and joined Samajwadi Party and was appointed district president of Samajwadi Party.

== Political career ==
Jitendra Verma contested Uttar Pradesh Assembly Election as Bharatiya Janata Party candidate and defeated his close contestant Avadhesh Kumar Nishad msjhwar, Yuva Sahitykar, Rajendra Singh from Samajwadi Party with a margin of 34,364 votes.HE left BJP before 2022 VidanSabha Elections and joined Samajwadi party. Now he is working as a senior leader active member of Bhartiya Janta Party.

== Posts held ==
#	From	To	Position	Comments
01	2017	Incumbent	Member, 17th Legislative Assembly	
