= Chamrauli, Shikohabad =

Village in Uttar Pradesh, India

Chamrauli is a village in Shikohabad Block in Firozabad District of Uttar Pradesh State, India. It belongs to Agra Division. It is located 16 km towards east from district headquarters Firozabad. 3 km from Shikohabad. 283 km from State capital Lucknow.

Chamrauli Pin code is 205145 and postal head office is Makkhanpur.

Shikohabad, Sirsaganj, Firozabad, Fatehabad are the nearby Cities to Chamrauli. The village has primary school.
