= Chamrauli, Fatehabad =

Village in Uttar Pradesh, India

Chamrauli is a village in Fatehabad Block in Agra District of Uttar Pradesh State, India. It belongs to Agra Division . It is located 33 km towards South from District headquarters Agra. 12 km from Fatehabad. 319 km from State capital Lucknow

Chamrauli Pin code is 282001 and postal head office is Agra.
