= Midhakur =

Village in Uttar Pradesh, India

Midhakur is a Town in Agra. It is situated on NH-11 Agra, Jaipur Highway, just 20 minutes drive from Agra. Fatehpur Sikari is only 15 km from Midhakur. Seven communities are an integral part of this place and people have cordial relations among.famous person Rajeev Chaudhary is lives in this village

== Economy ==
Midhakur has land and plots and development of new housings adjoining the highway. The economy is driven by various restaurants and vast market of essential commodities. There is a traditional system of haath on Tuesday and Saturday in which people get fresh vegetables at very cheap rates. Midhakur has a central market selling commodities ranging from household items to agricultural fertilizer (vashudev Prasad Satish chand) computers, laptops, telecommunication (B.D. Enterprises), Solanki Automobiles etc. Additionally, banks such as the State Bank of India, Canara Bank, and Bank of India provide banking facilities and ATM services in Midhakur.

== Government ==
Midhakur falls within the ambit of Sadar Tehsil, Agra where all the revenue matters are taken care off. There is a police station situated in Midhakur, which falls under the jurisdiction of Malpura Thana. The local governance and development works are looked by the gram pradhan under the supervision of state government.

== Infrastructure ==
Midhakur has proper medical facilities with various sitting doctors and the construction of a government hospital has fostered the growth of community health. Leather Park is also nearby to this place. Public transportation facility is also very reliable. There is a railway station of NCR region in Midhakur. There is a police station also for a positive environment. Being so close to main city you can have access to all the things within 20 minutes.

== Education ==
There is one government intermediate college named Janta Inter College. There are also two primary schools and one Saraswati sishu mandir. Moreover, there are three private colleges affiliated to C.B.S.E which have been imparting education to the children. Apart from this R.B.S Bichpuri a college of Agra is very nearby. A lot of private colleges are also providing quality education to college going students.
