= Shamsabad, Agra =

Shamsabad, Agra Shamsabad
- City
- Location in Uttar Pradesh, India
- Coordinates: 27.02°N 78.13°E
- Country: India
- State: Uttar Pradesh
- District: Agra
- Elevation: 165 m (541 ft)

Population (2011)
  - Total: 33,144

Language
  - Official: Hindi
  - Additional official: Urdu
- Time zone: UTC+5:30 (IST)
- Postal code: 283125

Shamsabad is a city and a municipal Corporation in Agra district in the Indian state of Uttar Pradesh.

== Geography ==
Shamsabad is located at 27.02°N 78.13°E. It has an average elevation of 165 metres (541 feet).

== Demographics ==
As of 2011 Indian Census, Shamsabad had a total population of 33,144, of which 17,433 were males and 15,711 were females. Population within the age group of 0 to 6 years was 5,187. The total number of literates in Shamsabad was 18,838, which constituted 56.8% of the population with male literacy of 63.1% and female literacy of 49.9%. The effective literacy rate of 7+ population of Shamsabad was 67.4%, of which male literacy rate was 75.0% and female literacy rate was 59.0%. The Scheduled Castes population was 5,005. Shamsabad had 4938 households in 2011.

As of 2001 India census, Shamsabad had a population of 27,260. Males constitute 53% of the population and females 47%. Shamsabad has an average literacy rate of 52%, lower than the national average of 59.5%: male literacy is 60%, and female literacy is 42%. In Shamsabad, 18% of the population is under 6 years of age.
