= Kheragarh =

- Town
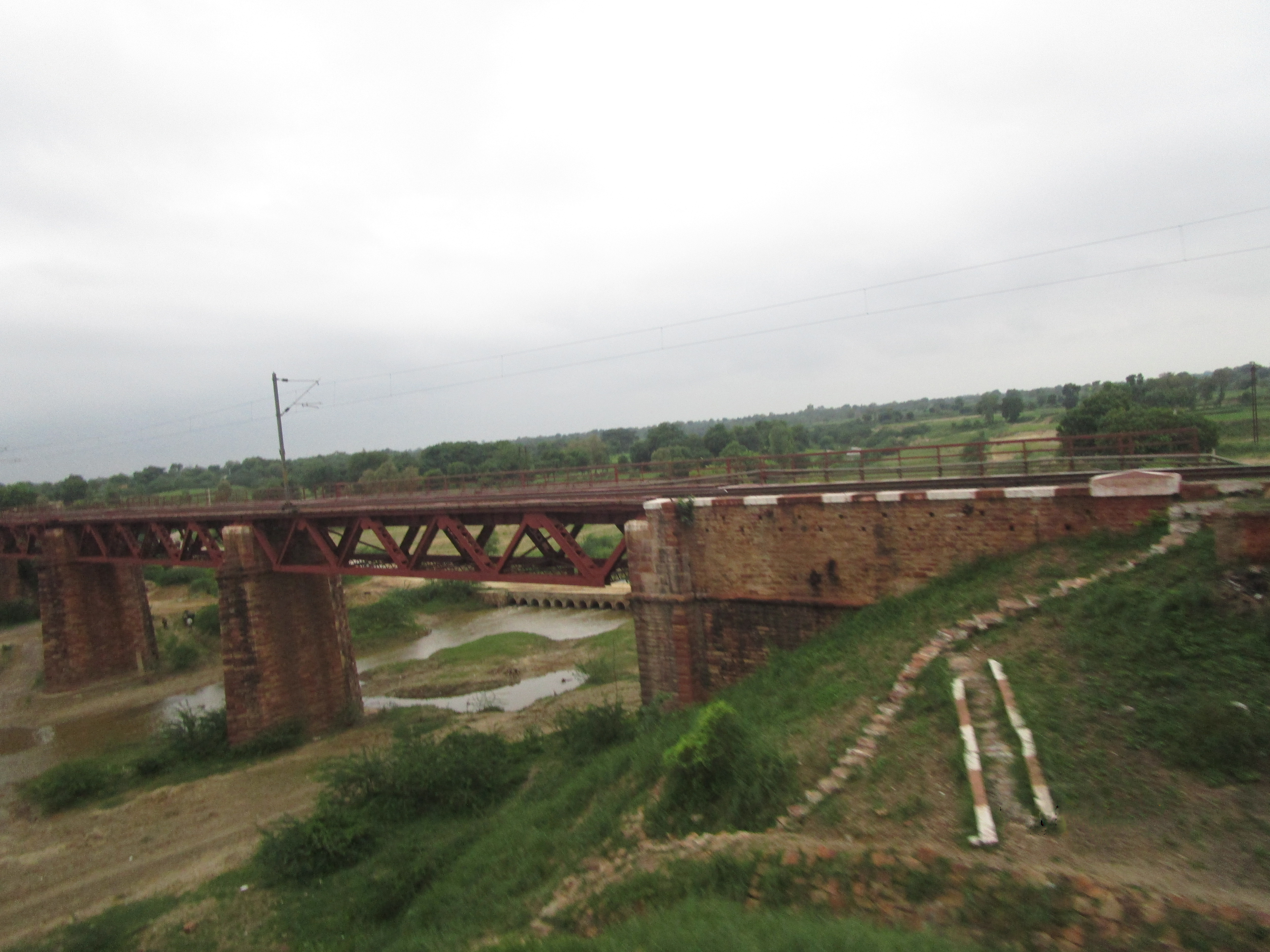
- A river at Bisahara, Kheragarh, Uttar pradesh

- Location in Uttar Pradesh, India Kheragarh (India)
- Coordinates: 26°56′N 77°49′E
- Country: India
- State: Uttar Pradesh
- District: Agra

Population (2011)
  - Total: 33,045

Language
  - Official: Hindi
  - Additional official: Urdu
- Time zone: UTC+5:30 (IST)
- PIN: 283121
- Telephone code: 915613
- Vehicle registration: UP 80

Kheragarh is a town and a nagar panchayat in Agra district in the Indian state of Uttar Pradesh. The distance of the town from Agra is 40 kilometers.

== Demographics ==
As of 2011 India census, Kheragarh had a population of 33,045. Males constitute 54% of the population and females 46%. Kheragarh has an average literacy rate of 65.68%, lower than the national average of 74%: male literacy is 59.3%, and female literacy is 40.7%. In Kheragarh, 14.75% of the population is under 6 years of age.

== River ==
Kheragarh is situated on the bank of river Utangan. Which merges with Parvati and Chambal rivers.
