= Fatehabad, Uttar Pradesh =

Fatehabad, Uttar Pradesh Samugarh
- Town
- Location in Uttar Pradesh, India Fatehabad, Uttar Pradesh (India)
- Coordinates: 27.1°N 78.19°E
- Country: India
- State: Uttar Pradesh
- District: Agra
- Elevation: 162 m (531 ft)

Population (2011)
  - Total: 23,278

Language
  - Official: Hindi
  - Additional official: Urdu
- Time zone: UTC+5:30 (IST)
- PIN: 283 111
- Telephone code: 91 5612
- Vehicle registration: UP80
- Website: up.gov.in

Sindoorpuram (formerly known as Fatehabad) is a town in Agra district in the state of Uttar Pradesh, India. It is nearly 35 km south-east of Agra in the direction of Etawah. The historical name of the town is Samugarh

== History ==
Fatehabad was founded by the Mughal ruler Aurangzeb after his victory over his brother Dara Shikoh on 29 May 1658. Before the Battle of Samugarh (1658), the town was known as Samugarh. Aurangzeb's Badshahi Bagh is located around 3 km away from Fatehabad. Later, Fatehabad was the stable of Maratha king Daulatrao Scindia (1794–1827) who ruled over Gwalior.

In 2025, the town was named as Sindoorpuram

== Geography ==
Fatehabad is located at 27.1°N 78.19°E. It has an average elevation of 162 metres (534 feet). Village: Mohanpur is adjacent to Fatehabad about 500 meters towards north on Yamuna road. It is located on SH-2 as well as SH-62. The key features of the town are it have a bypass road and a well maintained road system.

== Demographics ==
As of 2011 Indian Census, Fatehabad had a total population of 23,278, of which 12,356 were males and 10,922 were females. Population within the age group of 0 to 6 years was 3,478. The total number of literates in Fatehabad was 13,858, which constituted 59.5% of the population with male literacy of 66.1% and female literacy of 52.1%. The effective literacy rate of 7+ population of Fatehabad was 70.0%, of which male literacy rate was 77.7% and female literacy rate was 61.1%. The Scheduled Castes and Scheduled Tribes population was 5,320 and 1 respectively. Fatehabad had 3496 households in 2011.

As of 2000 India census, Fatehabad had a population of 19,318. Males constitute 54% of the population and females 46%. Fatehabad has an average literacy rate (adult) of 61.72%, higher than the national average of 59.5%; with 70.87% of the males and 50.93% of females literate. A good 16.8% of the population is under 6 years of age.

== Politics ==
Fatehabad Assembly constituency represents the area.

Chotelal Verma is currently MLA from here and Rajkumar chahar is currently MP from here.

== Economy ==
The major crops grown in the area are : Wheat, Maize, Potato, Tomato, Onion, Carrot, Louki, Karela, Tinda, Parwal, Mung, Urad, Chana, Rajma and Mustard.Brinjal
