= Saiyan, Agra =

Saiyan
- village
- Location in Uttar Pradesh, India
- Coordinates: 26°56′36″N 77°56′31″E
- Country: India
- State: Uttar Pradesh
- District: Agra

Population (2011)
  - Total: 12,247

Languages
  - Official: Hindi
- Time zone: UTC+5:30 (IST)
- Postal code: 283104

Saiyan is a village in Agra district of Uttar Pradesh in India.
