= Jagner =

- Town
- Location in Uttar Pradesh, India
- Coordinates: 26.86293°N 77.60167°E
- Country: India
- State: Uttar Pradesh
- District: Agra

Population (2011)
  - Total: 11,575
- Demonym

Language
  - Official: Hindi
  - Additional official: Urdu
- Time zone: UTC+5:30 (IST)
- Postal code: 283115

Jagner is a small town and a nagar panchayat in Agra district in the Indian state of Uttar Pradesh. It is located in the southern part of Agra district and about 57 km from Agra city.

== History ==
The town of Jagner is spread out around a hill-fort which itself is located on a precipitous hill, 122 meters above ground level. The fort houses a popular pilgrim destination, the shrine of Gwal Baba, named after the cow loving saint who lived in the cave centuries ago. The name Jagner is derived from the name of king "Jagan Singh" who was a ruler in the 13th century.

== Demographics ==
As of 2011 Indian Census, Jagner had a total population of 11,575, of which 6,238 were males and 5,337 were females. Population within the age group of 0 to 6 years was 1,736. The total number of literates in Jagner was 7,677, which constituted 66.3% of the population with male literacy of 74.4% and female literacy of 56.9%. The effective literacy rate of 7+ population of Jagner was 78.0%, of which male literacy rate was 87.6% and female literacy rate was 66.8%. The Scheduled Castes population was 2,745. Jagner had 1668 households in 2011.

As of 2001 India census, Jagner had a population of 9,683. of which males were 5,273 and females were 4,410. Jagner had a crude literacy rate of 52% with male literacy of 62% and female literacy of 40%. In Jagner, 1,715 of the population were under 6 years of age.
