= Pinahat =

- Town
- Location in Uttar Pradesh, India Pinahat (India)
- Coordinates: 26.88°N 78.38°E
- Country: India
- State: Uttar Pradesh
- District: Agra
- Elevation: 135 m (443 ft)

Population (2011)
  - Total: 18,709
- Demonym

Language
  - Official: Hindi
  - Additional official: Urdu
- Time zone: UTC+5:30 (IST)

Pinahat (formerly Shreenagar) is a town and a nagar panchayat in Agra district in the Indian state of Uttar Pradesh and situated on the Bank of Chambal River (the Ghadiyal Sanctuary). It is about 55 km from Agra. The distance between Pinahat and Chambal is only 2 km.

== Demographics ==
As of 2011 Indian Census, Pinahat had a total population of 18,709, of which 9,880 were males and 8,829 were females. Population within the age group of 0 to 6 years was 3,189. The total number of literates in Pinahat was 10,595, which constituted 56.6% of the population with male literacy of 63.8% and female literacy of 48.6%. The effective literacy rate of 7+ population of Pinahat was 68.3%, of which male literacy rate was 77.4% and female literacy rate was 58.2%. The Scheduled Castes and Scheduled Tribes population was 5,068 and 3 respectively. Pinahat had 2860 households in 2011.

At the 2001 India census, Pinahat had a population of 17,028. Males constituted 53% of the population and females 47%. Pinahat had an average literacy rate of 52%, lower than the national average of 59.5%: male literacy was 64%, and female literacy was 39%. In Pinahat, 20% of the population were under 6 years of age.
