= Barauli Ahir =

Glorified Village in Uttar Pradesh, India

- village
- Location in Uttar Pradesh, India
- Coordinates: 27°7′21″N 78°3′27″E
- Country: India
- State: Uttar Pradesh
- District: Agra
- Elevation: 147 m (482 ft)

Population (2011)
  - Total: 6,695

Languages
  - Official: Hindi
- Time zone: UTC+5:30 (IST)
- Postal code: 283125

Barauli Ahir is a village in Agra district of Uttar Pradesh in India.

Barauli Ahir is a village in Fatehpur Sikri Vidhan Sabha The village has very less crime rate as compared to the state, people live with harmony here. Barauli Ahir was named one of the cleanest village's in the State. Barauli Ahir village has a higher literacy rate compared to Uttar Pradesh. In 2011, the literacy rate of Barauli Ahir village was 78.82% compared to 67.68% of Uttar Pradesh. In Barauli Ahir Male literacy stands at 88.85% while the female literacy rate was 67.60%.
