= Chamrauli, Chamba =

Village in northern India

Coordinates: 32.586°N 76.054°E

Chamrauli is a village located in Chamba Tehsil of Chamba district in Himachal Pradesh, India. It is situated 19 km away from Chamba, which is both district & sub-district headquarter of Chamrauli village. The PIN code of village is 176314. with total 100 families residing. The Chamrauli village has population of 498 of which 246 are males while 252 are females as per Population Census 2011.
