= Dharampal Singh =

Indian politician

Dr. Dharampal Singh

MLA, 16th Legislative Assembly
- In office March 2012 – March 2017
- Preceded by: Narayan Singh
- Constituency: Etmadpur

MLA, 18th Legislative Assembly
- Incumbent
- Assumed office May 2022
- Preceded by: Narayan Singh
- Constituency: Etmadpur

Personal details
- Born: 1 June 1963 (age 63) Mainpuri district
- Party: Bharatiya Janata Party
- Other political affiliations: Bahujan Samaj Party (Until 2022)
- Spouse: Rajkumari (wife)
- Children: 1 son
- Parent: Prithviraj Singh (father)
- Education: Dr. Bhimrao Ambedkar University
- Profession: Teacher, politician

Dharampal Singh is an Indian politician and a member of the 16th Legislative Assembly of India. He represents the Etmadpur constituency of Uttar Pradesh and is a member of the Bharatiya Janata Party.

== Early life and education ==
Dharampal Singh was born in Mainpuri district. He attended the Dr. Bhimrao Ambedkar University and attained Doctor of Philosophy degree.

== Political career ==
Dharampal Singh has been a MLA for two terms. He represented the Etmadpur constituency and is a member of the Bhartiya Janata Party and former member of the Bahujan Samaj Party political party.

== Member of the Legislative Assembly ==
From	To	MLA in Assembly	As a member of Party
March 2012	March 2017	Member, 16th Legislative Assembly	Bahujan Samaj Party
March 2022	March 2027	Member, 18th Legislative Assembly	Bhartiya Janata Party

== See also ==
- Etmadpur (Assembly constituency)
- Sixteenth Legislative Assembly of Uttar Pradesh
- Uttar Pradesh Legislative Assembly
