= Chamrauli, Unnao =

Village in Uttar Pradesh, India

Chamrauli Village in Sumerpur Block in Unnao District of Uttar Pradesh State, India. It comes under Nikha Mau Panchayath. It belongs to Lucknow Division . It is located 51 km towards South from District headquarters Unnao. 82 km from Lucknow. The postal code is 209801
