= Achhnera =

- Town
- Location in Uttar Pradesh, India Achhnera (India)
- Coordinates: 27.18°N 77.77°E
- Country: India
- State: Uttar Pradesh
- District: Agra
- Elevation: 167 m (548 ft)

Population (2011)
  - Total: 22,781

Language
  - Official: Hindi
  - Additional official: Urdu
- Time zone: UTC+5:30 (IST)
- PIN: 283101

Achhnera, (alternate spelling: Achnera) is a town and a municipal board in Agra district in the Indian state of Uttar Pradesh.

== History ==
There are multiple theories regarding the foundation of Achhnera. According to one of these theories, it was founded by Achhnidhar Jats in 1250 AD, while according to another it was founded by Anangpal Tomar of the Tomara dynasty. In 1738 AD, King Suraj Mal of Bharatpur gave the jagir of Achhnera and 23 villages to his son-in-law. Achhnera also served as the headquarter of a pargana during Jat rule.

== Geography ==
Achhnera is located at 27.18°N 77.77°E. It has an average elevation of 167 metres (547eet). It is famous for its cultural values; people of different religions live here. There are many temples which have historic values. Achhnera is in Tehsil Kiraoli. It is reachable through Agra Jaipur Highway. The city is connected by rail to Agra, Jaipur, Kanpur and Mathura.

The temperature in Achhnera is typical of northern India, with cold nights in winter and heat waves in summer. In winter the temperature drops to 1–2°C and in summer it rises to 45–47°C. Rain is always good.

== Demographics ==
As of the 2001 India census, Achhnera had a population of 22,781, of which males were 12,117 and females were 10,664. Achhnera has an average literacy rate of 58.7%, with 65.8% of the males and 50.7% of females literate. Population in the age group of 0 to 6 years was 3,313. The Scheduled Castes and Scheduled Tribes population were 4,890 and 6 respectively. Achhnera had 3665 households as of 2011.

== Employment ==
There are few opportunities of employment in Achnera. People travel to nearby cities like Agra, Mathura, or Bharatpur for employment. Achnera is surrounded by villages and the economy mainly depends on agriculture. The agricultural production depends on the weather, rains on proper time.
