= Khandip =

Khandip Khandeep
- Village
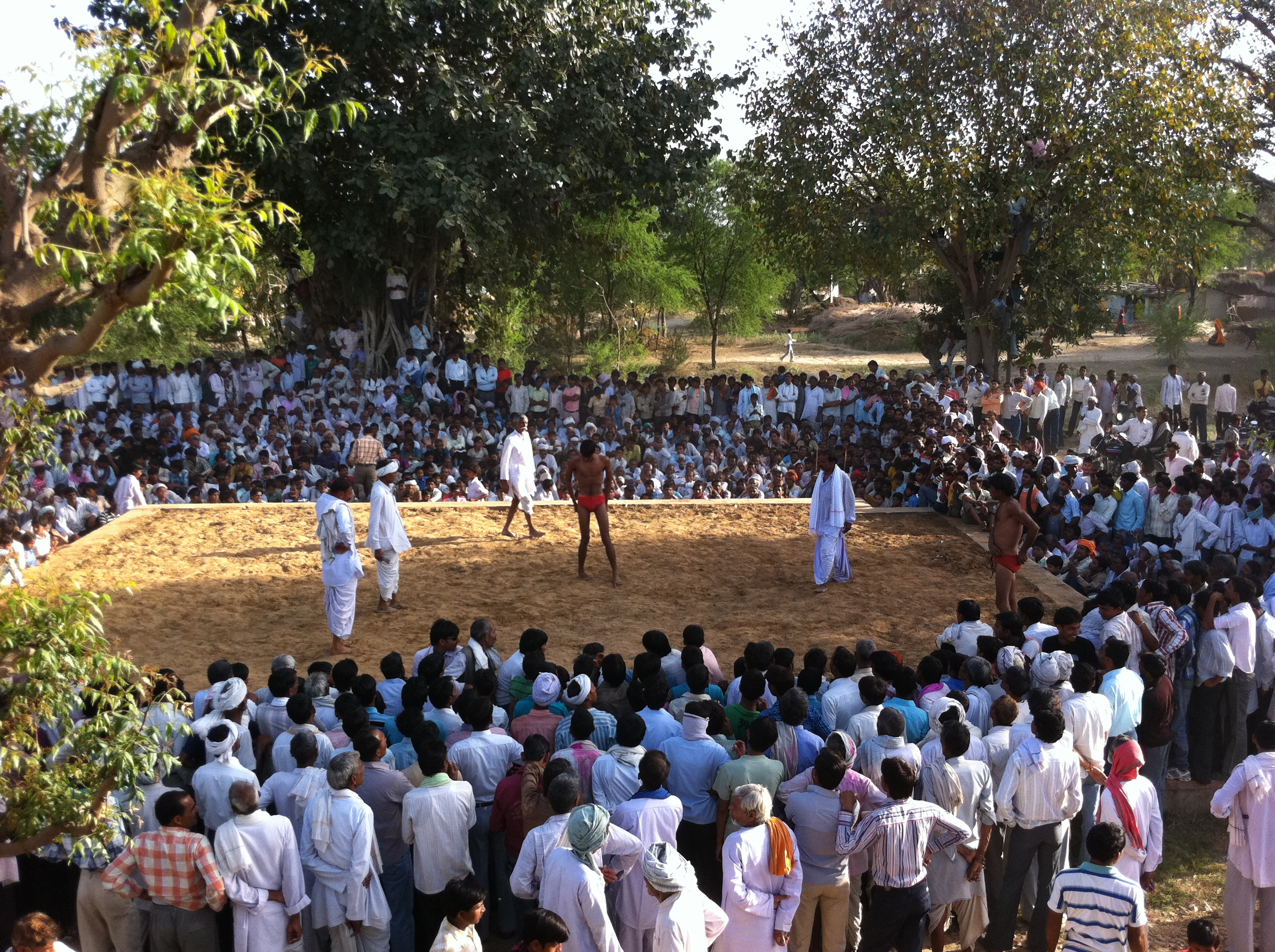
- Randukadi Kushti Dangal in Village Khandip

- Location in Rajasthan, India
- Coordinates: 26°36′0″N 76°54′0″E
- Country: India
- State: Rajasthan
- District: Sawai Madhopur

Area
  - Total: 17.4589 km^{2} (6.7409 sq mi)

Population (2011)
  - Total: 8,092

Languages
  - Official: Rajasthani and Hindi
- Time zone: UTC+5:30 (IST)
- PIN: 322205
- Telephone code: 07463 (2277**)
- ISO 3166 code: RJ-IN
- Vehicle registration: RJ25
- Nearest city: Gangapur City, Sawai Madhopur
- Sex ratio: According to the 2011 census, there are about 864 females per 1000 males

Khandip is a village in Sawai Madhopur district in the state of Rajasthan, India.

Khandip is located along the main railway line from Delhi to Mumbai, accessed via Kota on the rail path from New Delhi. The village's standing population currently exceeds 8000, with the majority of the region's population settled throughout the Lakwad, Lakwar Meena community. Khandip's geographic designation encompasses an area of approximately 17.4589 km2.

== Basic facilities ==
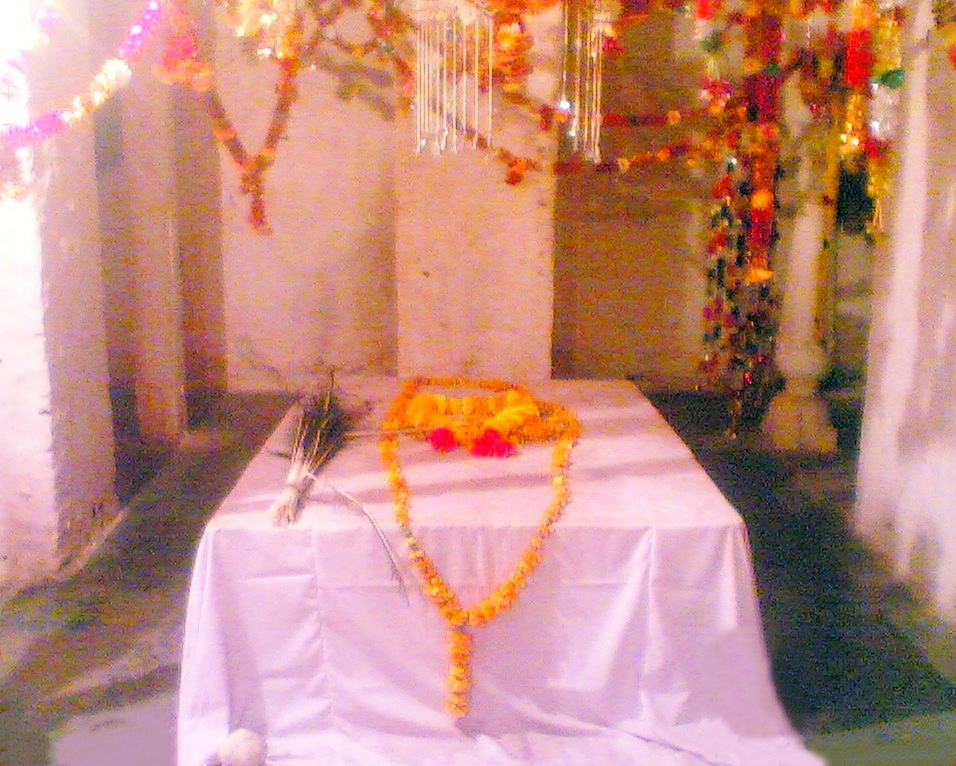
PeerBaba Shrine

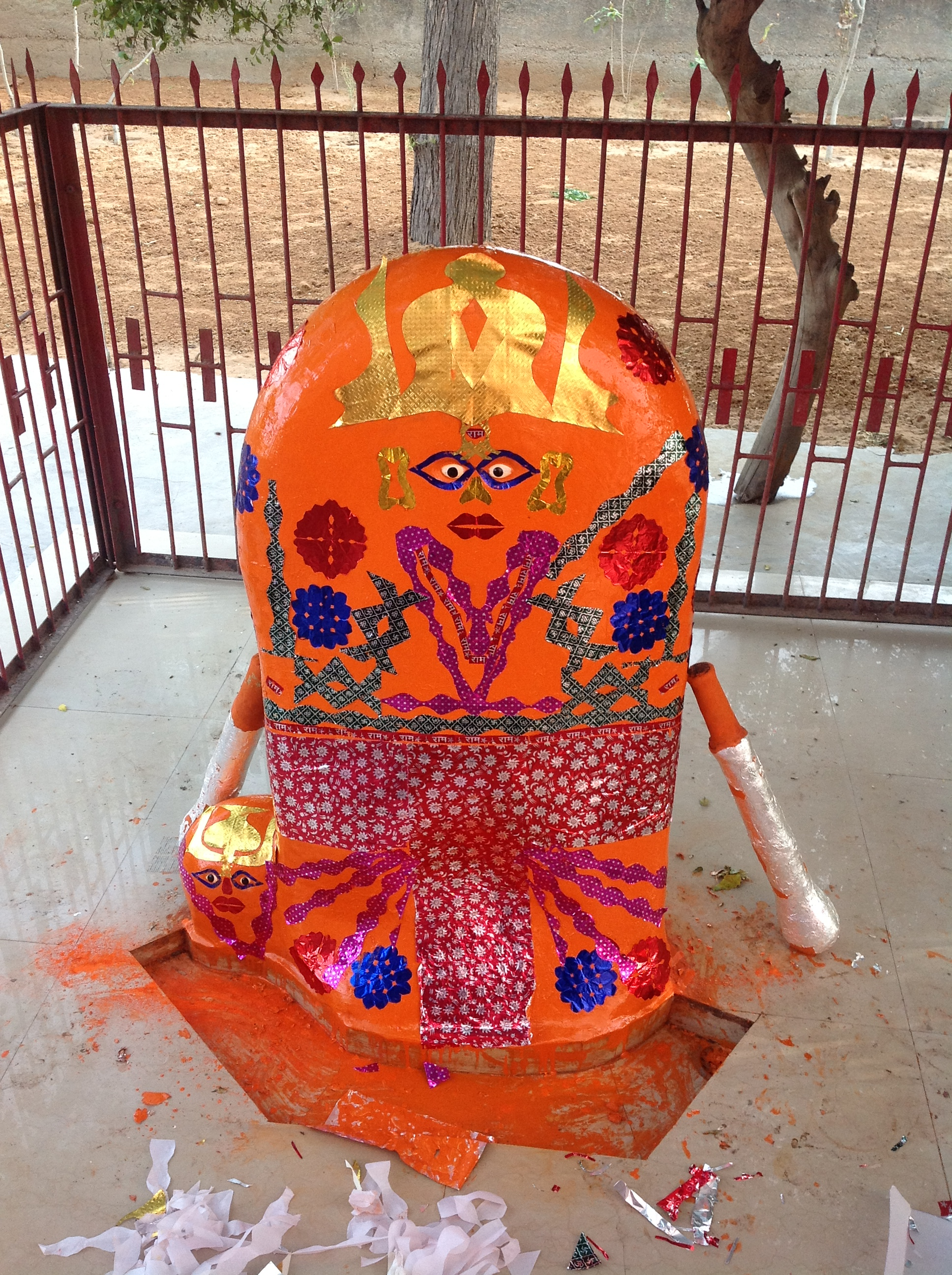
Hanumanji Temple

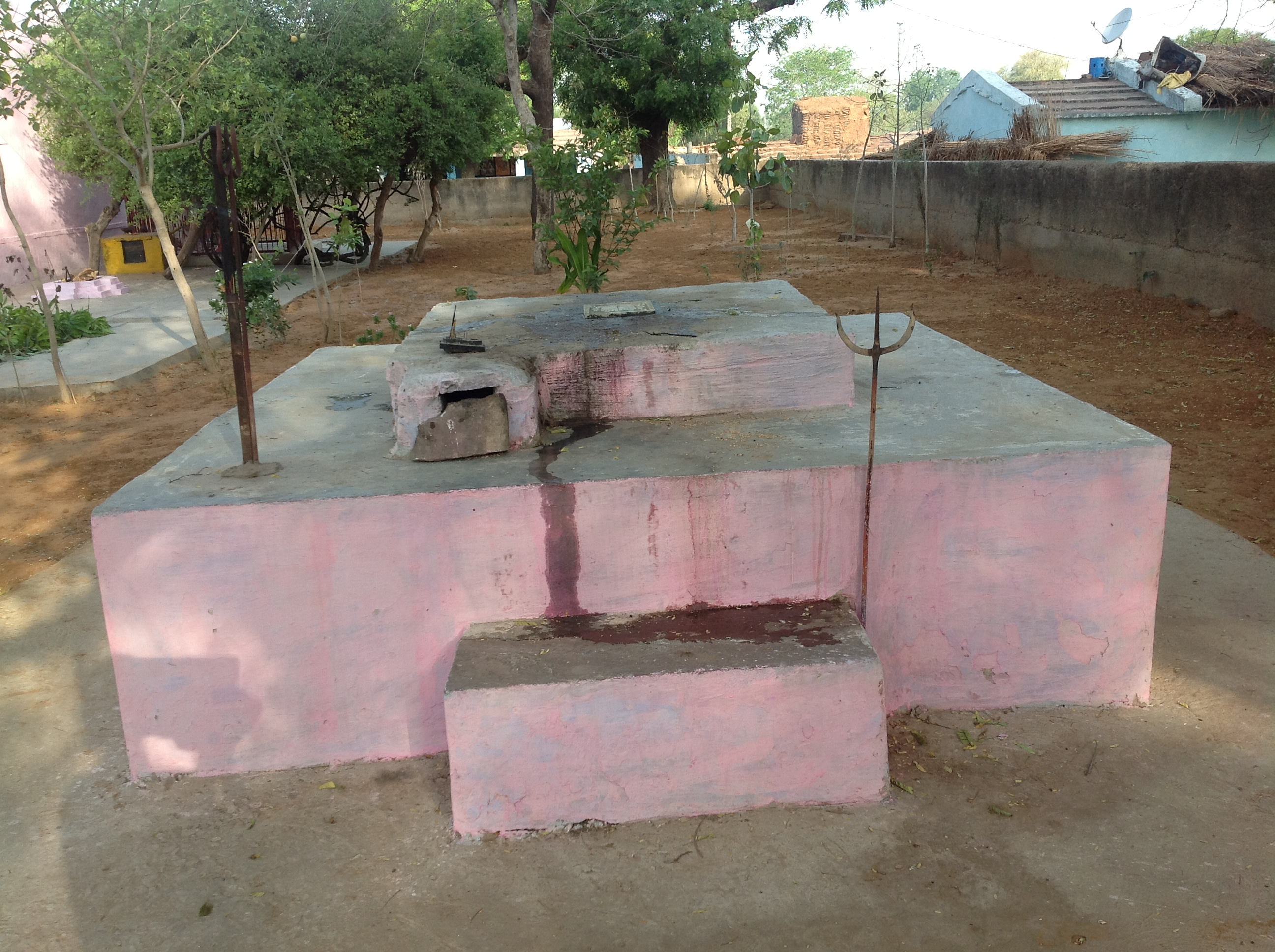
Siddh Baba

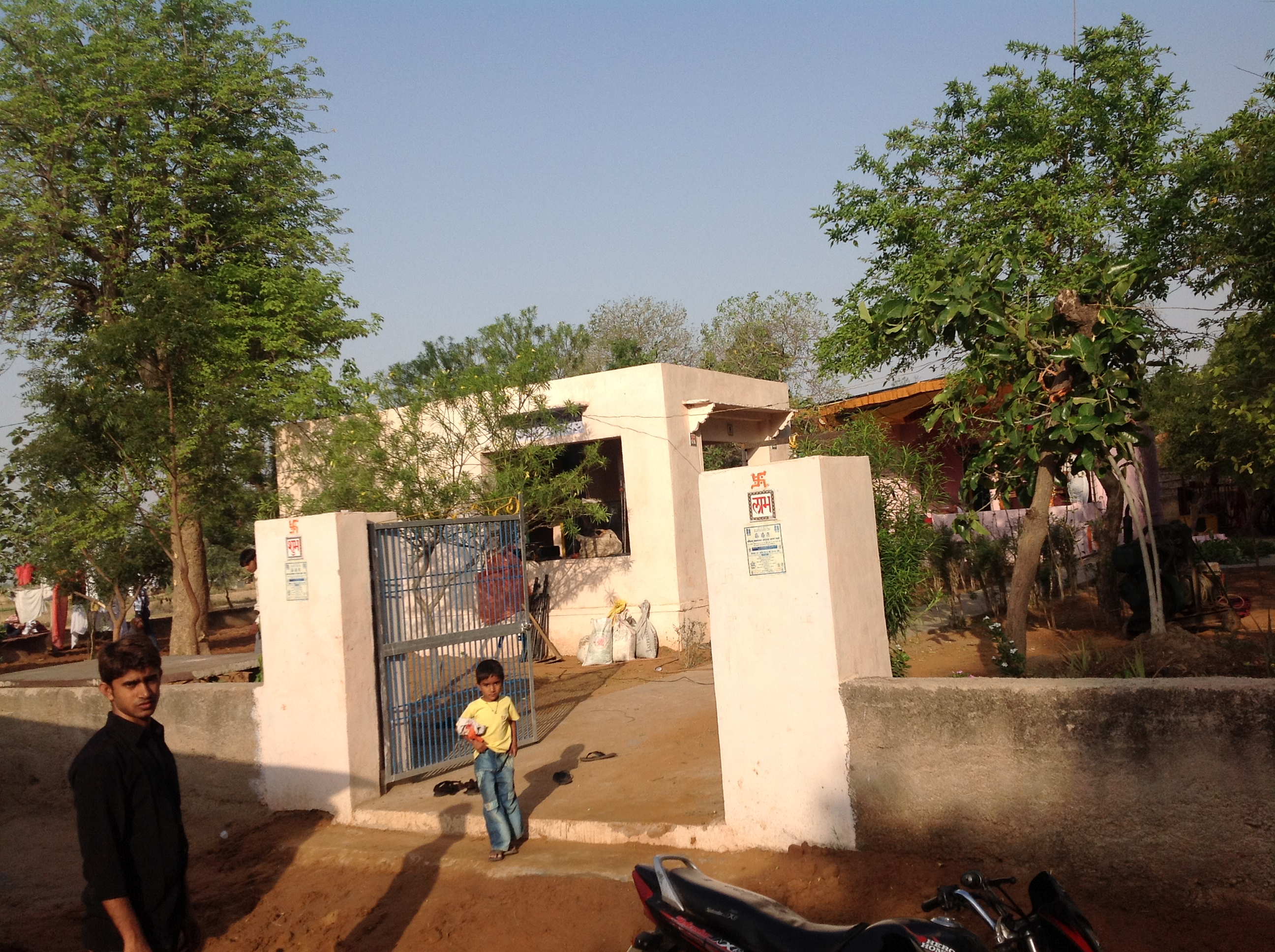
Temple bajrangbali

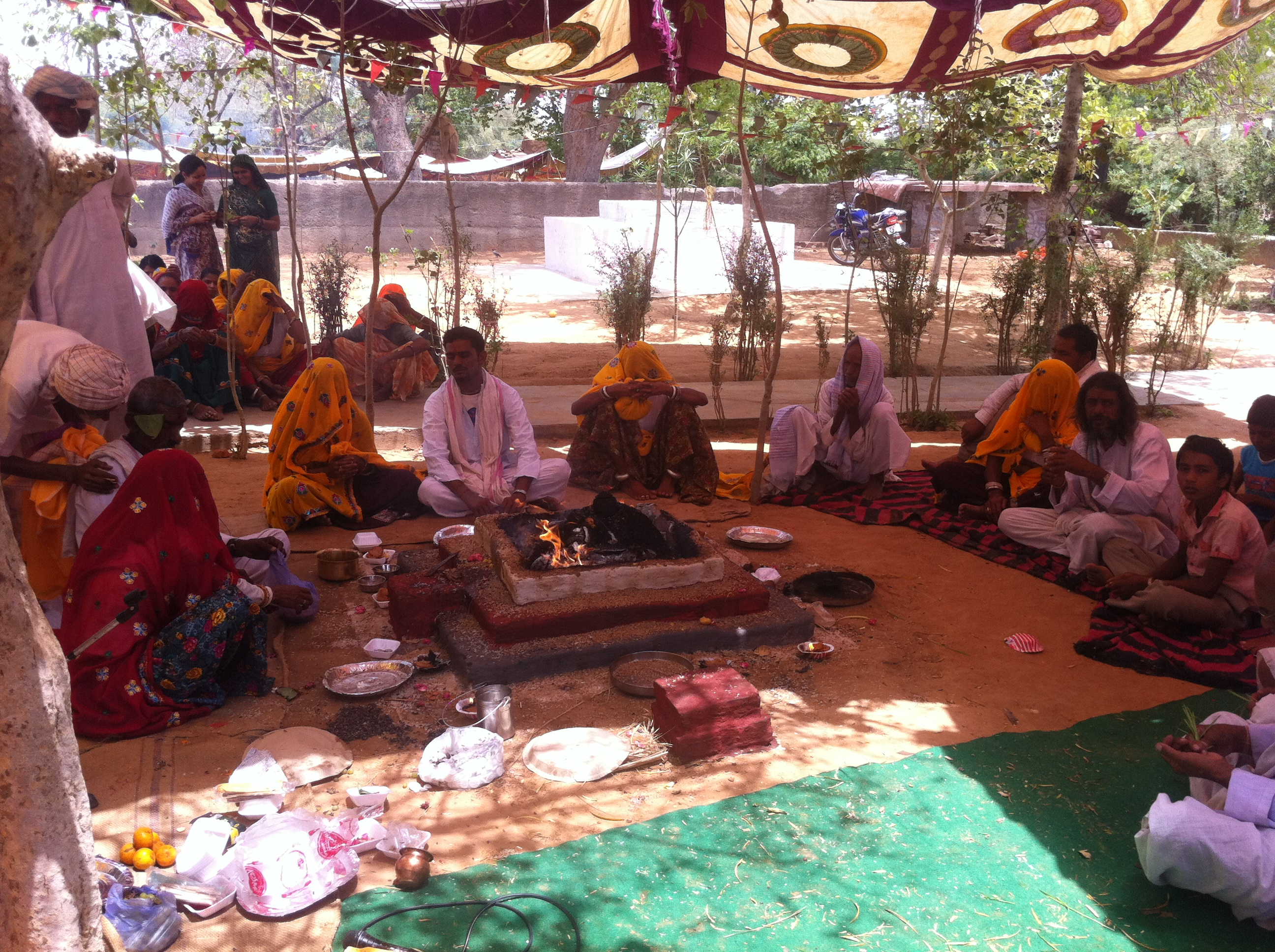
Saptah Hawan

=== Water ===
There are 20 government, 24 private resources and 14 hand pumps in the village. Most of the resources are Deep Tubewells which are dependent on ground water. Village is also the part of chambal sawaimadhopur nadauti project sawaimadhopur baler schemes.

=== Schools ===
Schools that serve Khandip include:

1. mahatma Gandhi English medium school
2. Govt Senior Secondary School, near Peer Baba, Khandip
3. Vishal Senior secondary school, Chamar Darwaja
4. Vikash Adarsh Vidya Mandir Senior Secondary School, Darawaja Chauk
5. Indira Vidya Mandir Senior Secondary School, Sotan Chauk
