= Agra division =

Administrative division of Uttar Pradesh, India

Coordinates: 27.1833°N 78.0167°E

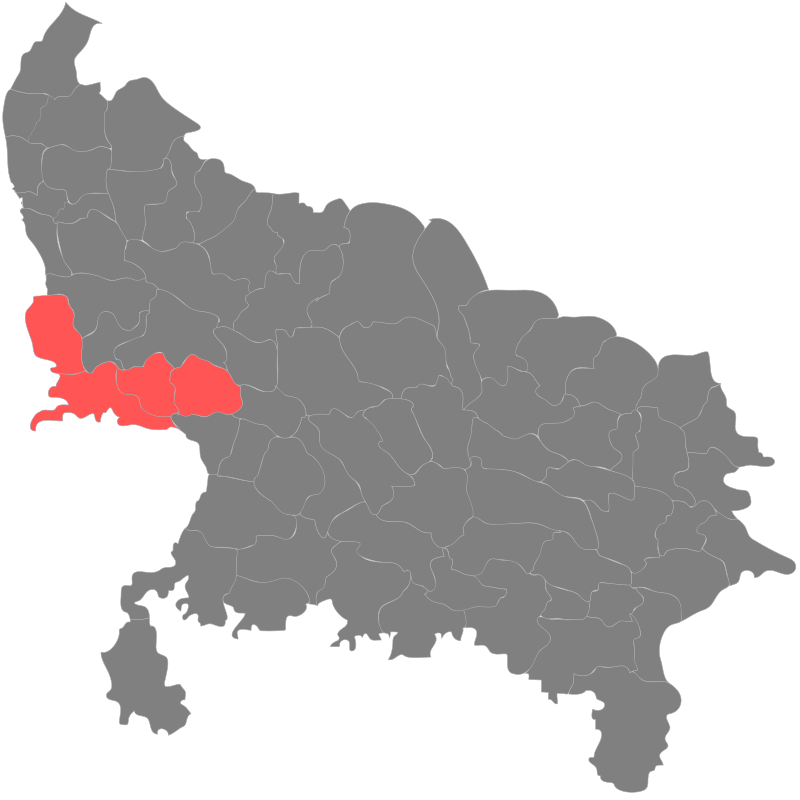
Agra division

Agra division (Hindi pronunciation: [aːgɾaː]) is one of the 18 administrative geographical units of the northern Indian state of Uttar Pradesh. It contains 4 districts i.e. Agra, Firozabad, Mainpuri and Mathura districts. The population of Agra Division was 11,332,666 as of 2011 census. Agra city is the headquarters of this division.

== Districts ==
- Agra
- Firozabad
- Mainpuri
- Mathura

== History ==
During the formation of state of Uttar Pradesh after independence, Agra division included districts of Agra, Aligarh, Mathura, Etah and Mainpuri. Firozabad district was created from Agra district on 2 February 1989. Later, Hathras district was carved out from Aligarh district on 3 May 1997. The then Chief Minister of Uttar Pradesh, Mayawati created a separate Aligarh division which contained the districts of Aligarh, Hathras, Etah and a newly created Kasganj district from Etah district on 15 April 2008.
