= Bah =

Area of Agra in Uttar Pradesh, India

- town
- Location in Uttar Pradesh, India
- Coordinates: 26°52′12″N 78°35′51″E
- Country: India
- State: Uttar Pradesh
- District: Agra
- Founder: Maharaja Kalyan Singh Bhadawar
- Elevation: 147 m (482 ft)

Population (2011)
  - Total: 16,211

Language
  - Official: Hindi
  - Additional official: Urdu
- Time zone: UTC+5:30 (IST)
- Postal code: 283104

Bah is a Block and sub-division in Agra district of Uttar Pradesh in India. The township is on the State Highway 62 of Uttar Pradesh. The place is surrounded by three rivers giving it its name.

== Geography ==
This place is situated in Agra district of Uttar Pradesh. Three rivers, Yamuna, Chambal and Utangan irrigate its land and separate it from the states Madhya Pradesh and Rajasthan. There has been several demands to make the Bah-Bateshwar district.

== History ==
The history of Bah can be dated back to Vedic Era. However, no archaeological findings have been found in the area but, analyzing using historical maps gives an insight of the history of place and various kingdoms or republics that have acquired the place

Prior to establishment of first known township the place was primarily a forest in the fertile land of Yamuna plains. The first known townships was established by Maharaja Mahendra Kalyan Singh of Bhadawar naming the place "Bah Kalyanpur". The name "Bah", literally meaning 'to flow' in local language, signifies the character of place. It is surrounded by three rivers: Chambal, Yamuna and Utangan.

From the very establishment of the township the Mughal Empire was declining so Mughal influence didn't reached the town and the history is much preserved locally for the region. From the very establishment the town has been a free place.

Following is a list of kingdoms, janapadas and republics that have resorted control over the area. The list has been compiled on basis of Map analysis of Various States so is prone to errors, but general details are credible but not final:

- Mahabharat Era: Part of Surasena
- Vedic Period: Kunti Kingdom
- 700 BCE - 322 BCE : Part of Surasena Kingdom.
- 345 BCE - 321 BCE : Part of Magadha, Nanda Dynasty
- 321 BCE - 180 BCE : Part of Magadha, Mauryan Empire
- 180 BCE - 124 BCE : Part of Shunga Empire
- 124 BCE - 1st BCE : Part of Kosala Principality, under Deva dynasty (Saketa)
- 1st BC - 1st CE : unknown, maybe Datta Dynasty
- 1st CE - 2nd CE : probably Mitra Dynasty
- 127 CE - 265 CE : Kushana Empire
- 266 CE - 335 CE : Unknown, probably under Nagas or Ahicchatras or both
- 336 CE - 510 CE : Gupta Empire, with some periods of discontinuity due to Hunas.
- 510 CE - 605 CE : Various post-Gupta, dominantly Maukhari Dynasty, Kannauj Kingdom.
- 606 c. CE - c. 650 CE : Pushyabhuti Dynasty, King Harsh
- 650 c. CE - end of 8th CE : Varman Dynasty
- 800 c. CE - 950 c. CE : Mostly by Gurjara-Pratihars
- 950 c. CE - 1000 c. CE: Pala Dynasty
- 1000 c. CE - 1065 c. CE : Paramara Dynasty (mainly Bhoja)
- 1065 c. CE - 1150 c. CE : Tomara Dynasty
- 1150 c. CE - 1192 c. CE : Chauhans of Ajmer
- 1194 c. CE - 1228 c. CE : Chauhans of Chandrawar.
- 1230 c. CE - 1256 c. CE : Mewati Freebooter rule.
- 1257 c. CE - 1805 c. CE : Bhadawar Kingdom (Largely free from Delhi Sultanate suzerainty)
- 19th c. CE - 15th August 1947 : Part of Taluqedari of Bhadawar Raj - British Raj and Company Rule.
- 15th of August 1947 - 26th of August 1951 : Dominion of India
- 26th of August 1950 - Present : Bhārat Gaṇarājya (English : Republic of India)
  - State of Union of India: Uttar Pradesh

== Demographics ==
As of 2011 Indian Census, Bah had a total population of 16,211, of which 8,564 were males and 7,647 were females, giving a sex ratio of 893. Population within the age group of 0 to 6 years was 2,173. The total number of literates in Bah was 10,950, which constituted 67.5% of the population with male literacy of 72.4% and female literacy of 61.9%. The effective literacy rate of 7+ population of Bah was 78.0%, of which male literacy rate was 84.4% and female literacy rate was 70.9%. The Scheduled Castes population was 1,645. Bah had 2661 households in 2011.

== Language ==
The main spoken language is Hindi, which is also the official language. Urdu is the additional official language.

== Administration ==
In the present time, Bah is a Tehsil place comprising three blocks namely Bah, Jaitpur and Pinahat.

== Politics ==
Bah (Assembly constituency) represents the area.

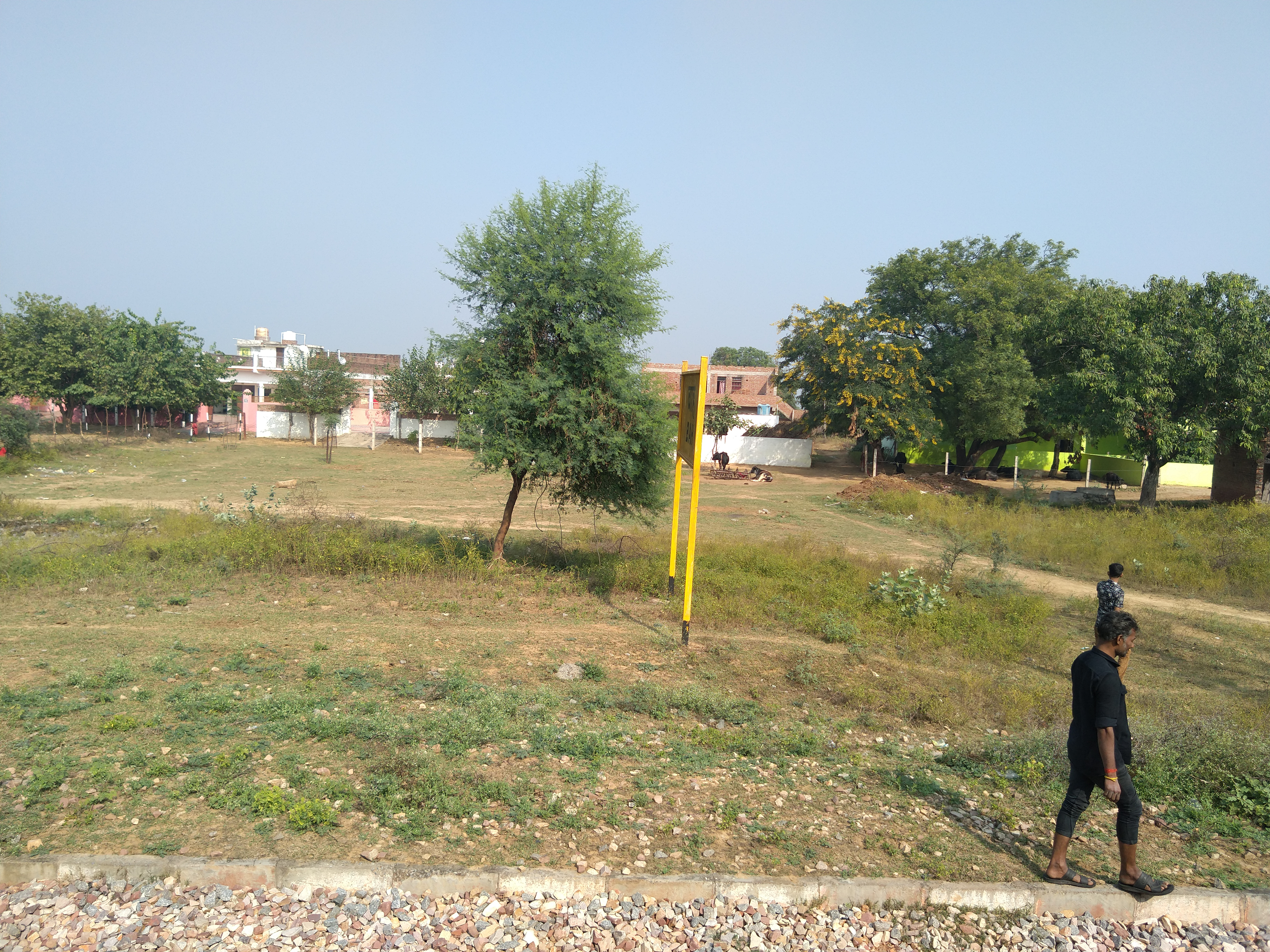
Bah railway station board

== Notable people ==
- Genda Lal Dixit (30 November 1888 – 21 December 1920) was an Indian revolutionary who led the Shivaji Samiti group of freedom fighters against the British Raj.
- Ankit Sharma is an athlete who competes in the long jump event. He was born on 20 July 1992 in Pinahat block.
