= Kiraoli =

City in Uttar Pradesh, India

- Town
- Location in Uttar Pradesh, India
- Coordinates: 27.15°N 77.78°E
- Country: India
- State: Uttar Pradesh
- District: Agra
- Elevation: 168 m (551 ft)

Population (2011)
  - Total: 23,788

Language
  - Official: Hindi
  - Additional official: Urdu
- Time zone: UTC+5:30 (IST)
- Postal code: 283122
- Vehicle registration: UP-80

Kiraoli is a town and a nagar panchayat in Agra district in the Indian state of Uttar Pradesh.

== Geography ==
Kiraoli is located at 27.15°N 77.78°E. It has an average elevation of 168 metres (551 feet). Kiraoli is on NH11 i.e. Agra Jaipur Highway. It also has railway station on Agra-Kota-Mumbai railway track. Kiraoli is a small town in between two most important historic places of mugal period, those are Agra (23 km) and Fatehpur Sikri (13 km).

== Demographics ==
As of 2011 Indian Census, Kiraoli had a total population of 23,788, of which 12,634 were males and 11,154 were females. Population within the age group of 0 to 6 years was 4,066. The total number of literates in Kiraoli was 12,903, which constituted 54.2% of the population with male literacy of 62.4% and female literacy of 45.0%. The effective literacy rate of 7+ population of Kiraoli was 65.4%, of which male literacy rate was 75.3% and female literacy rate was 54.2%. The Scheduled Castes and Scheduled Tribes population was 4,234 and 98 respectively. Kiraoli had 3423 households in 2011.

As of 2001 India census, Kiraoli had a population of 18,921. Males constitute 53% of the population and females 47%. Kiraoli has an average literacy rate of 49%, lower than the national average of 59.5%: male literacy is 59%, and female literacy is 38%. In Kiraoli, 20% of the population is under 6 years of age.
