= Agra district =

District in Uttar Pradesh, India

Coordinates: 27°05′N 77°58′E

- District
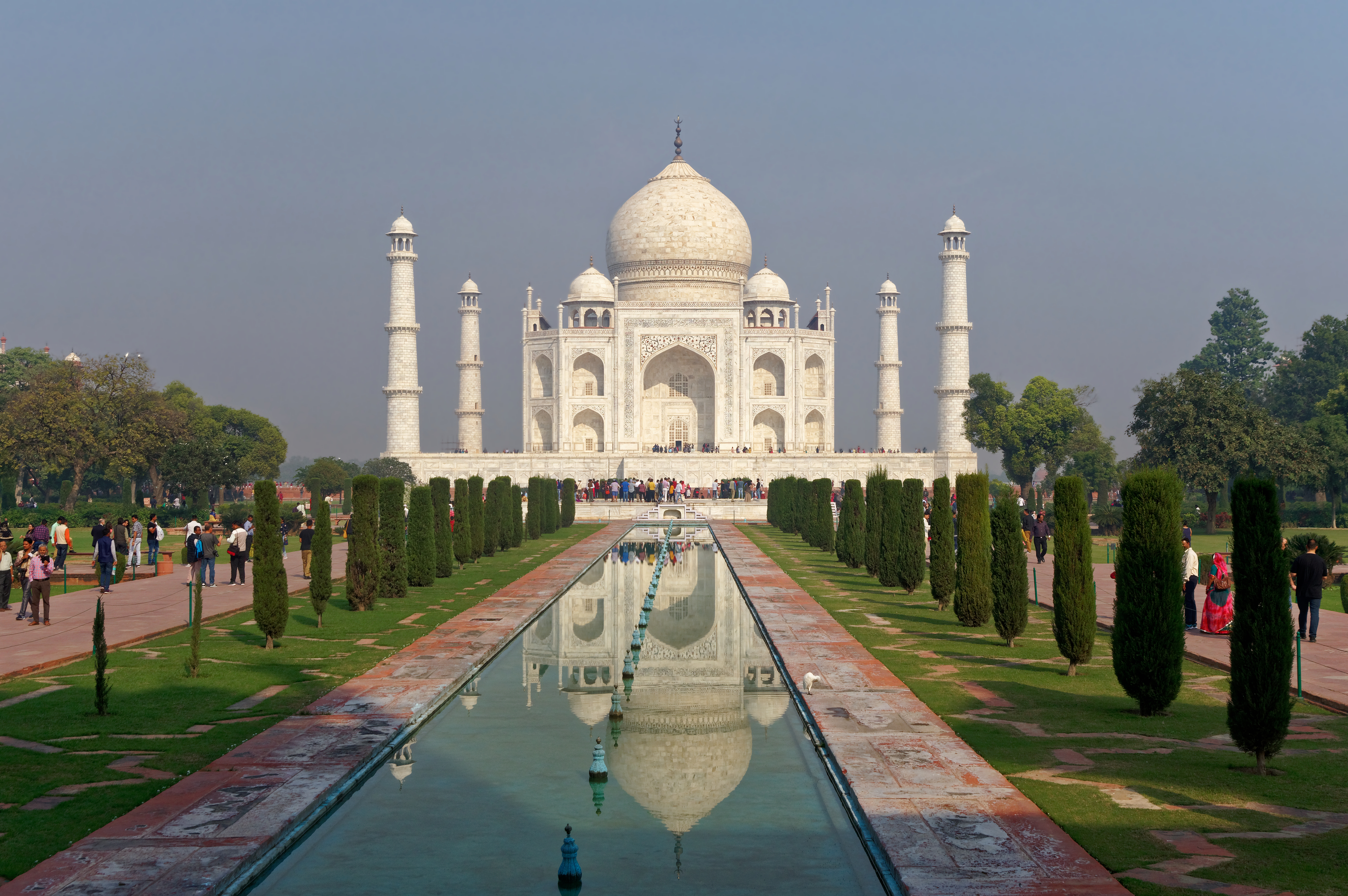
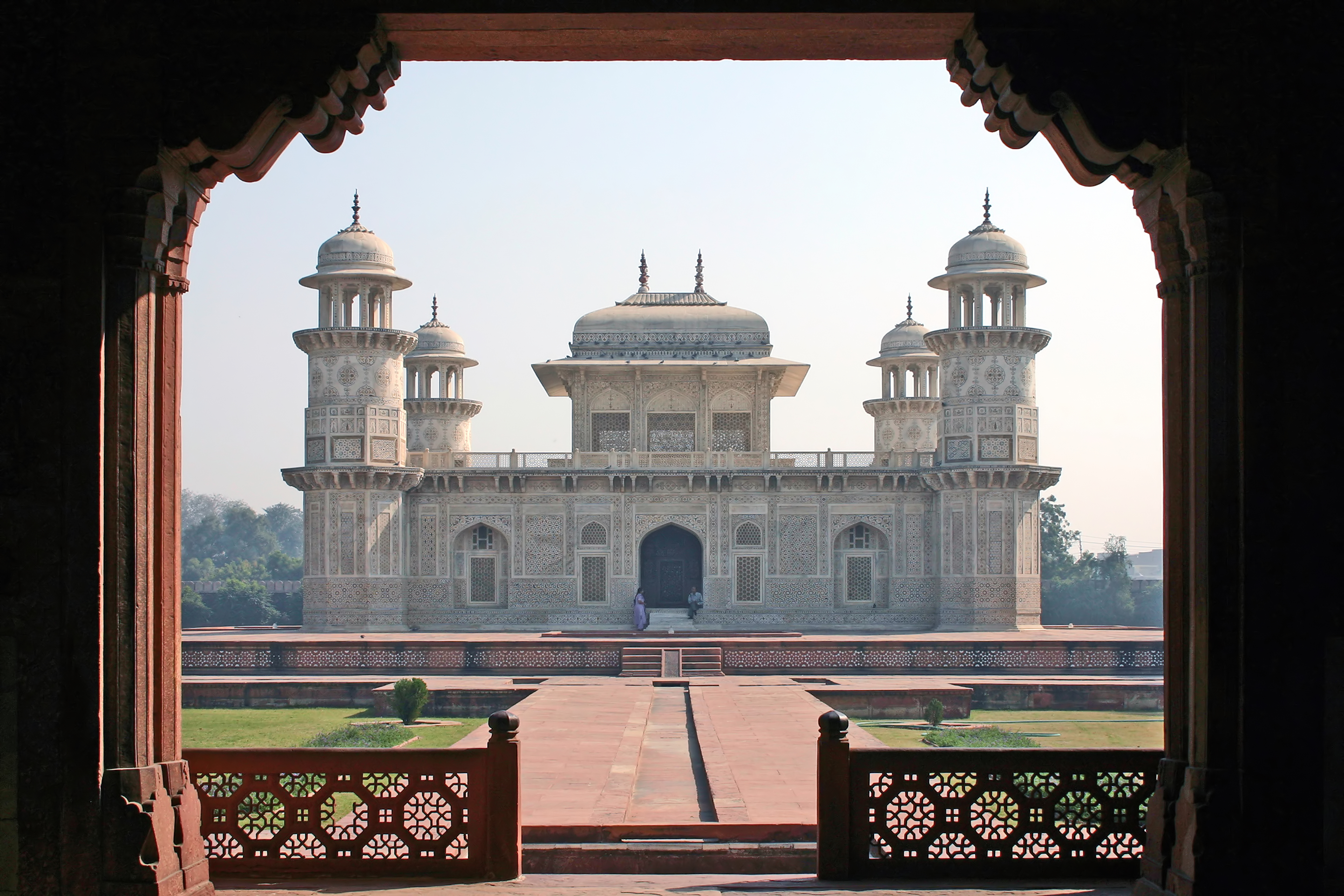
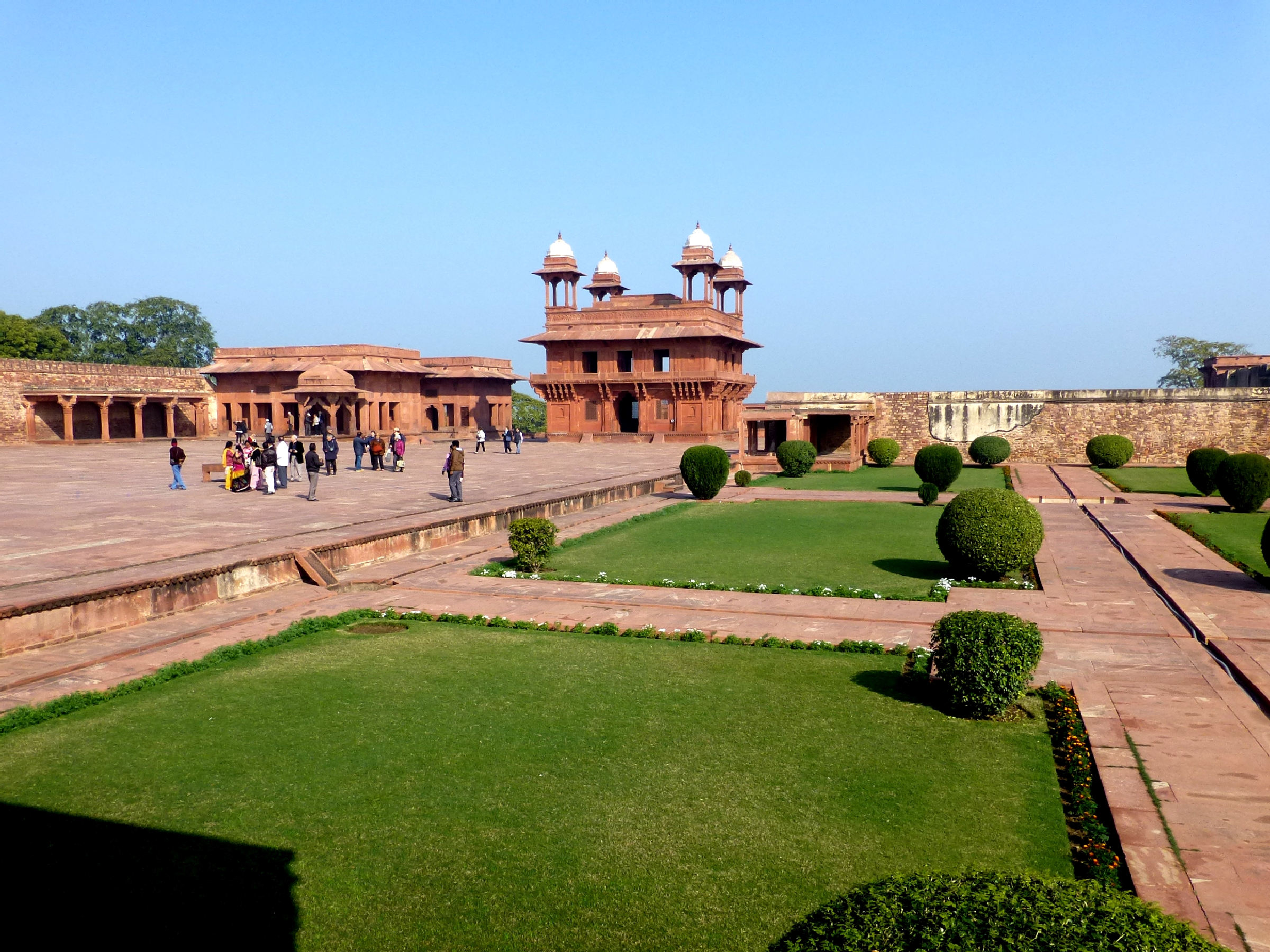
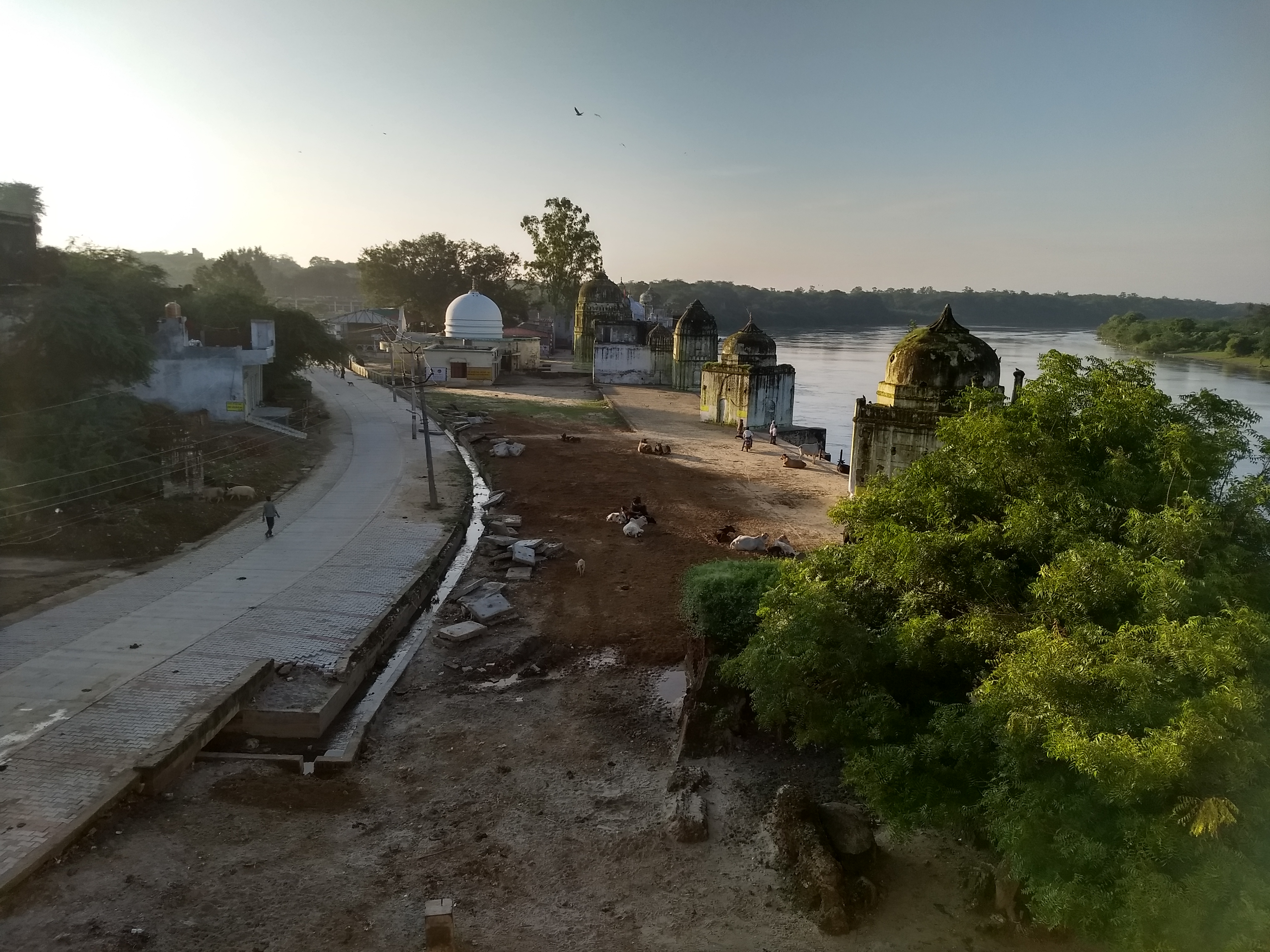
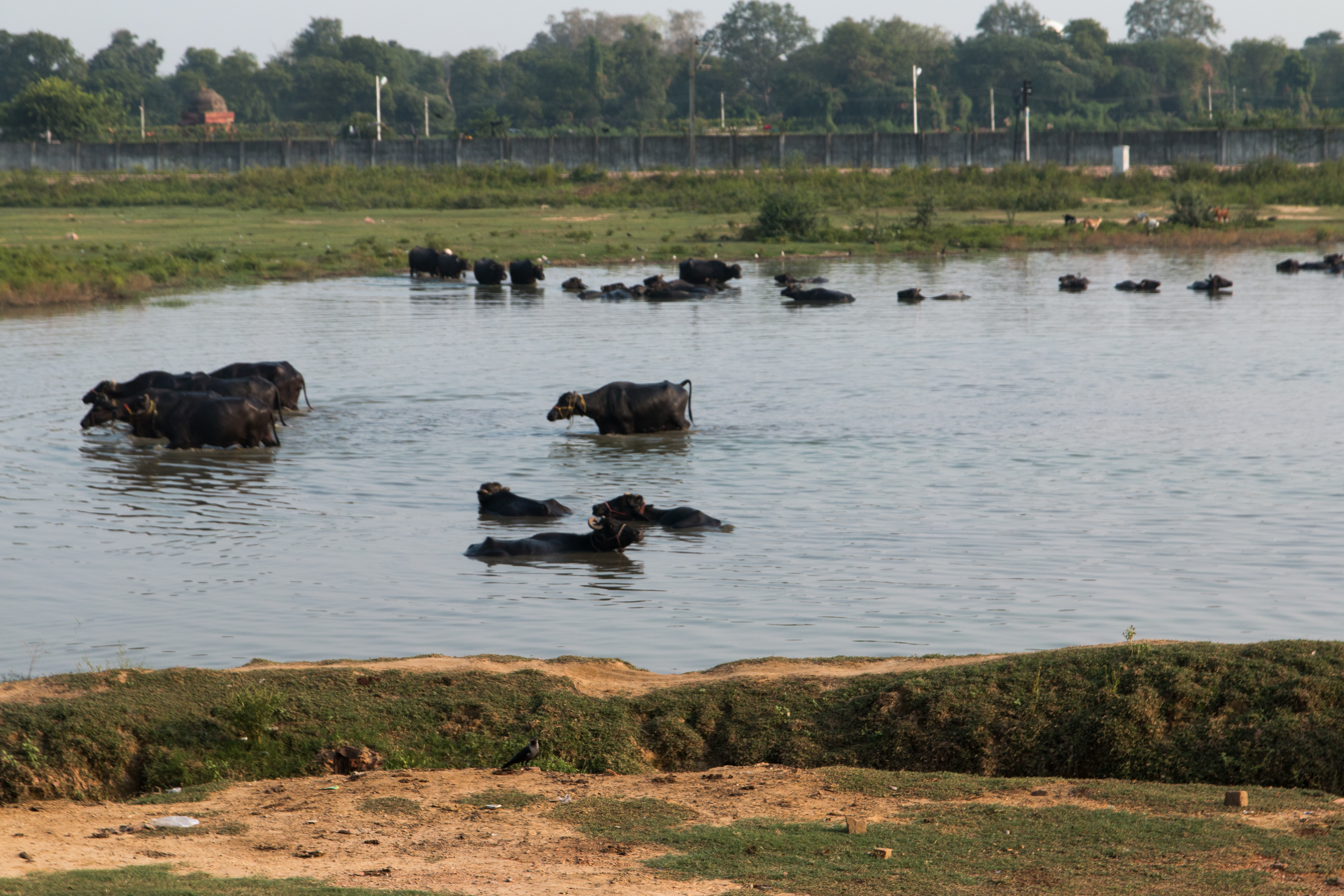
- Clockwise from top-left: Taj Mahal, Tomb of Itimad-ud-Daula, Yamuna River besides Bateshwar Jain Temple, Water buffalos in Kiraoli, Diwan-i-Khas in Fatehpur Sikri

- Location of Agra district in Uttar Pradesh
- Country: India
- State: Uttar Pradesh
- Division: Agra
- Headquarters: Agra
- Tehsils: 6

Government
  - Lok Sabha constituencies: 1. Agra (shared with Jalesar-Awagarh, Etah district), 2. Fatehpur Sikri
  - Vidhan Sabha constituencies: 9

Area
  - Total: 4,027 km^{2} (1,555 sq mi)

Population (2011)
  - Total: 4,418,797
  - Density: 1,097/km^{2} (2,842/sq mi)

Demographics
  - Literacy: 69.44%
  - Sex ratio: 875

Language
  - Official: Hindi
  - Native: Braj
- Time zone: UTC+05:30 (IST)
- Vehicle registration: UP-80
- Major highways: NH 2
- Website: Official Website

Agra district (Hindi pronunciation: [aːgɾaː]) is one of the 75 districts in the northern Indian state of Uttar Pradesh. The district headquarters is the historical city of Agra. Agra district is a part of Agra division.

== Geography ==
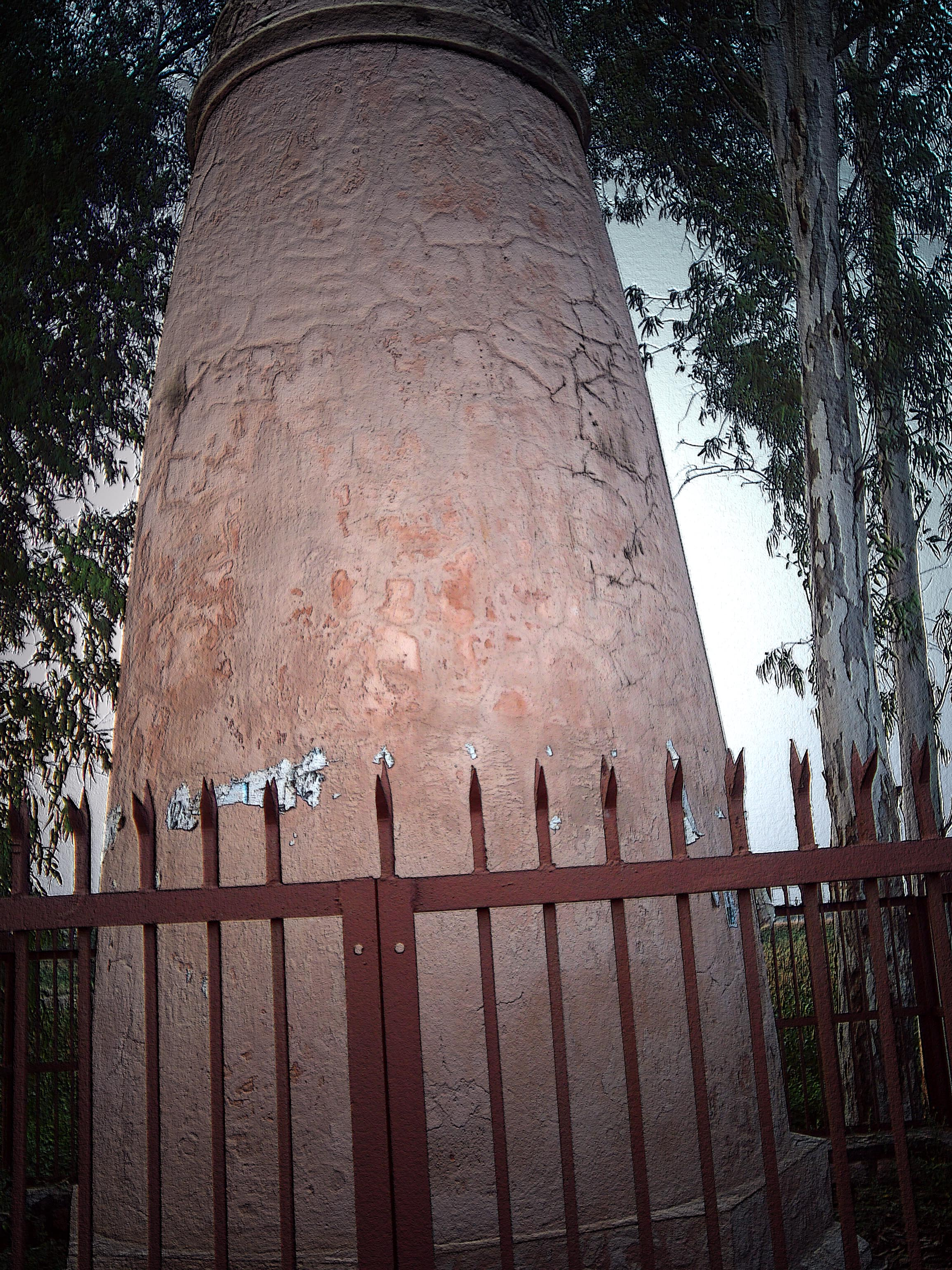
Kos Minar #793 at 12 mile on Agra-Fatehpur Sikri Road section of National Highway 21.

The district lies in the cultural region of Braj. Agra district is bounded by Mathura district on the north, Dholpur district of Rajasthan state on the south, Firozabad district on the east and Bharatpur district of Rajasthan on the west. The area of the district is 4,027 km^{2}.

== Administration ==
Agra division which consists of four districts, and is headed by the divisional commissioner of Agra, who is an IAS officer, the commissioner is the head of local government institutions (including municipal corporations) in the division, is in charge of infrastructure development in his division, and is also responsible for maintaining law and order in the division. The district magistrate of Agra reports to the divisional commissioner.

Agra district administration is headed by the district magistrate and collector (DM) of Agra, who is an IAS officer. The DM is in charge of property records and revenue collection for the central government and oversees the elections held in the city. The DM is also responsible for maintaining law and order in the city. The DM is assisted by a chief development officer; six additional district magistrates for finance/revenue, city, administration, land acquisition, civil supply, and protocol; one city magistrate; and three additional city magistrates.

== Divisions ==
Agra district comprises 6 tehsils. The tehsils are Etmadpur, Agra, Kiraoli, Kheragarh, Fatehabad and Bah. The headquarters of the district is Agra city. The district consists of 15 blocks, namely Etmadpur, Khandauli, Shamsabad, Fatehabad, Jagner, Kheragarh, Saiyan, Achhnera, Akola, Bichpuri, Fatehpur Sikri, Barauli Ahir, Bah, Pinahat and Jaitpur Kalan.

The division comprises 2 constituencies namely Agra and Fatehpur Sikri. There are 9 Vidhan Sabha constituencies in the district. They are Bah, Fatehabad, Etmadpur, Dayal Bagh, Agra Cantonment, Agra North, Agra South, Kheragarh and Fatehpur Sikri, Awagarh and Jalesar in Etah District.

== Demographics ==
Historical population
Year	Pop.	±% p.a.
1901	867,149	—
1911	835,418	−0.37%
1921	755,552	−1.00%
1931	857,072	+1.27%
1941	1,054,327	+2.09%
1951	1,228,534	+1.54%
1961	1,506,110	+2.06%
1971	1,852,458	+2.09%
1981	2,258,070	+2.00%
1991	2,752,150	+2.00%
2001	3,621,702	+2.78%
2011	4,418,797	+2.01%

Religions in Agra district (2011)
Religion	Percent
Hinduism	88.77%
Islam	9.31%
Jainism	0.49%
Other or not stated	1.43%
Distribution of religions

According to the 2011 census Agra district has a population of 4,418,797, roughly equal to the nation of Moldova or the US state of Kentucky. This gives it a ranking of 41st in India (out of a total of 640). The district has a population density of 1,084 inhabitants per square kilometre (2,810/sq mi) Hindus are 88.77% and Muslims are 9.30% in Agra district. Its population growth rate over the decade 2001-2011 was 21%. Agra has a sex ratio of 859 females for every 1000 males, and a literacy rate of 69.44%. 45.81% of the population lives in urban areas. Scheduled Castes made up 22.43% of the population.

Hindus are the majority population in the district, and predominate in rural areas. A large number of people did not state their religion during the census, and there are significant populations of Jains, Sikhs and Christians in Agra city.

Languages of Agra district (2011)
1. Hindi (97.4%)
2. Braj Bhasha (1.27%)
3. Others (1.35%)

At the time of the 2011 Census of India, 97.38% of the population spoke Hindi and 1.27% Braj Bhasha as their first language.

The language of Agra is Braj Bhasha, which is a Western Hindi language, predominant in the nebulous Braj region centred on Mathura and Agra in Uttar Pradesh and Dholpur & Bharatpur in Rajasthan. It is the predominant language in the central stretch of the Ganges-Yamuna Doab.
