= 2018 Atrocities Act protests =

April 2018 caste protests in India
- Date: 2 April 2018
- Location: India
- Caused by: The Supreme Court order on the Atrocities Act
- Goals: To prevent the dilution of the Atrocities Act
- Methods: Protesting, mobbing, Bandh
- Result: Parliament of India passes SC/ST Amendment act 2018, to overrule Supreme Court judgement

Casualties
- Deaths: 14
- Arrested: 100 (Haryana) about 10000 (Uttar Pradesh)/>

In early April 2018, thousands of people belonging to Scheduled Castes and Scheduled Tribes (SC/ST) protested across India against an order of the Supreme Court on the dilution of Atrocities Act. In subsequent violence, 14 people died and hundreds were injured.

Later, the Parliament of India passed the Scheduled Castes and the Scheduled Tribes (Prevention of Atrocities) Amendment Act, 2018, which reversed the Supreme Court judgement. The amendment act was upheld by the Supreme Court in 2020.

== Background ==
The Scheduled Caste and Scheduled Tribe (Prevention of Atrocities) Act, 1989 protects the SC/ST caste groups. The act does not allow the court to grant anticipatory bail to accused person. The police must file a First Information Report (FIR) and arrest the accused on receiving a complaint. In 2016, the conviction rate under the act was 25.7% in cases of atrocities against SC and 20.8% in cases against ST in 2016, according to the National Crime Records Bureau. On 20 March 2018, the Supreme Court of India ruled that no arrests can be made without prior permission and allowed a court to grant an anticipatory bail if it, prima facie, finds the complaint an abuse of the law. The Attorney General of India, on behalf of the Government of India, filed a review petition against the order of the Supreme Court.

Digital media, such as social media, have played a vital role in such protests.

== Protests ==
The people from Scheduled Castes and Scheduled Tribes (SC/ST) protested against the Supreme Court order. Thousands of people took to the streets on 2 April 2018, when a national strike was announced by representatives of the SC/ST caste groups in protest of the decision. The protests turned violent across several states in India as the protestors blocked trains, damaged property, and clashed with police and other civilians. There were also incidents involving arson, vandalism and gunfire. At least fourteen people were killed: nine in Madhya Pradesh, Three in Uttar Pradesh, two in Rajasthan; hundreds of others were injured. Violent incidents were also reported in the states Punjab, Bihar, Jharkhand, Odisha, Gujarat, Haryana, Maharashtra and Delhi.

Suspected non-Dalit groups, who were angered by the rampage, targeted Dalit slums in retaliation and burnt the house of Bharosi Lal Jatav, a former MLA Indian National Congress (INC) legislator, and ransacked the home of Rajkumari Jatav, a MLA Bharatiya Janata Party (BJP) legislator from Hindaun, Rajasthan. A curfew was imposed in Hindaun following the violence, and later extended.

Twenty four government vehicles and sixty private vehicles were damaged in Haryana. 84 police officials and eight civilians were injured during the violence on 2 April in Haryana. Nine policemen were injured in Ghaziabad, Uttar Pradesh.

== Response ==
Thousands of protesters were arrested and curfew was imposed in several places. 1700 anti-riot police were sent to states by the Government of India. Section 144 of the Criminal Procedure Code (CrPC) (which prohibits assembly of more than four people) was imposed in Haridwar, Uttarakhand. Police had filed reports against 5,000 unidentified and 285 named miscreants, while 32 agitators were arrested under various sections of the Indian Penal Code in Ghaziabad. At least fifteen FIRs were registered by the police in Ludhiana, Punjab against hundreds of unidentified protesters for alleged road blockades and for causing obstructions. The Haryana Police booked around 4,000 persons and 100 others were arrested for indulging in violence while as many as 47 FIRs were lodged. The internet services were suspended in Punjab and Rajasthan.

== Aftermath ==
The Supreme Court held hearing on the review petition on 3 April 2018 but did not stay the order and have called to hear the matter in ten days

Later, the Parliament of India passed the Scheduled Castes and the Scheduled Tribes (Prevention of Atrocities) Amendment Act, 2018, which reversed the Supreme Court judgement. The amendment act was upheld by the Supreme Court in 2020.
