= Baragama =

- Village
- Location in Rajasthan, India Baragama (India)
- Coordinates: 26.734273°N 76.962056°E
- Country: India
- State: Rajasthan
- District: Karauli
- Elevation: 230 m (750 ft)

Languages
  - Official: Hindi
  - Other spoken: Rajasthani
- Time zone: UTC+5:30 (IST)
- PIN: 322230
- Telephone code: 07469

Baragama is a village in mahaveer Tehsil, Karauli district, Rajasthan, India, and forms a part of Bharatpur Division. It is located 34 km (21 mi) north of the district headquarters at Karauli, 7 km (4.3 mi) from Hindaun and 131 km (81 mi) from the state capital at Jaipur.

== Demographics ==
Hindi is the local language.

== Transport ==
Nearby rail stations are Sikroda Mina Railway Station, Shri Mahahaveer Ji Railway Station, and Hindaun City Railway Station. The nearest major station is 106 km (66 mi) distant at Alwar.

Nearby bus stands are those at Hindaun and Banwaripur.

== Temples ==
Baragama has three temples:

- Shri Nahar Singh & Pathan Baba
- Hunuman Ji Ka
- Jain Sthanak
