= Kaila Devi Temple =

Hindu temple in Kailadevi, Rajasthan

Kaila Devi
- कैलादेवी मंदिर
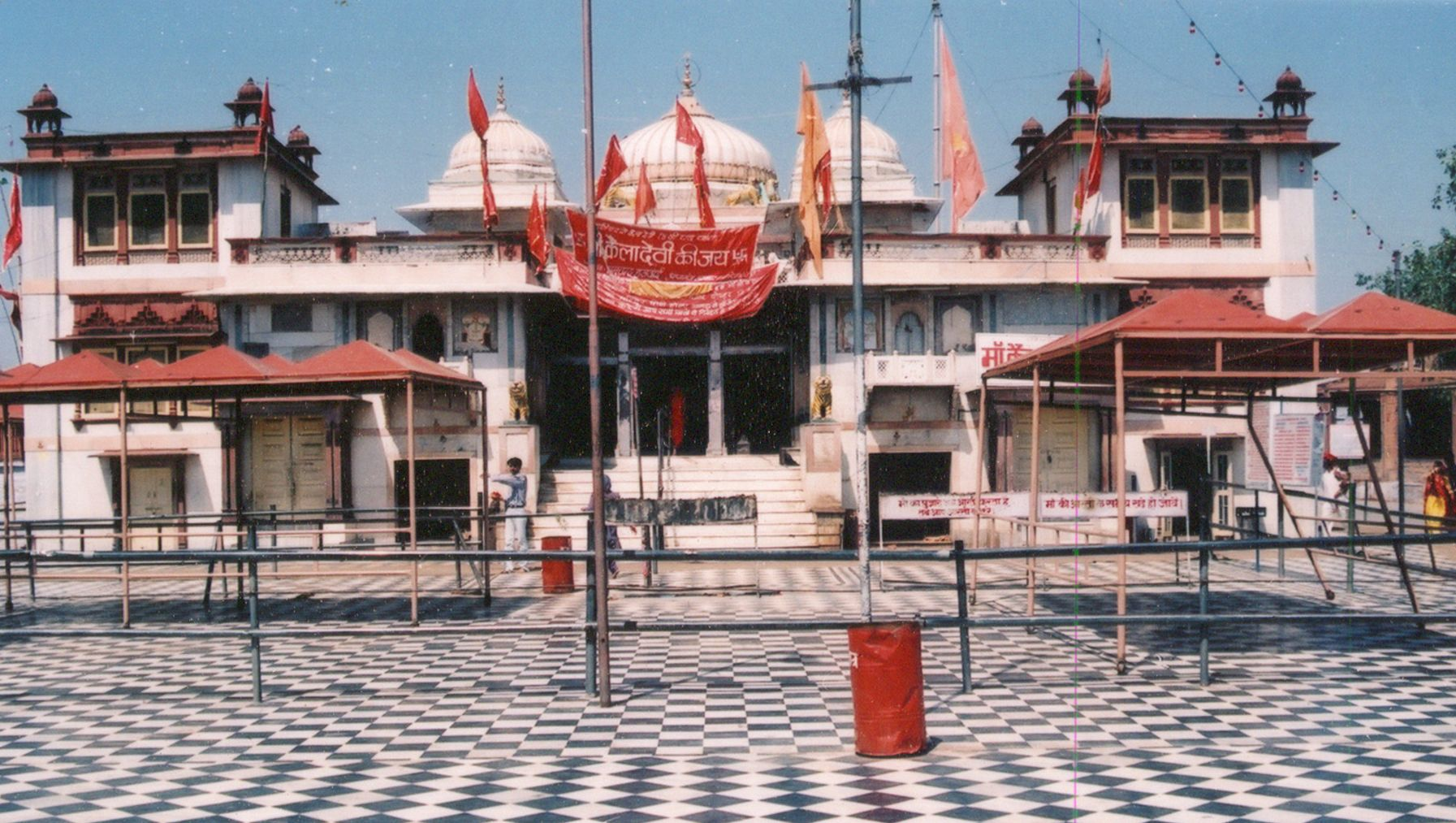
- A view of the temple

- Location in Rajasthan, India Kaila Devi Temple (India)

Religion
- Affiliation: Hinduism
- District: Karauli
- Deity: Lakshmi / Yogamaya
- Festival: Kaila Devi Annual Fair

Location
- Location: Kailadevi
- State: Rajasthan
- Country: India
- Interactive map of Kaila Devi
- Coordinates: 26°20′6.3″N 76°53′37.7″E

Architecture
- Creator: Shri Bhom Pal Ji
- Completed: 1600 AD

Website
- https://www.kailadevitemple.com/the-temple/

Kaila Devi Temple is a Hindu temple situated in Kailadevi village of Karauli district, in the Indian state of Rajasthan.

== Geography ==
The nearest cities are Karauli (23 km), Gangapur City (34 km) and Hindaun City (58 km). The temple is located on the banks of the Kalisil River, a tributary of the Banas River in the hills of Aravali.

== History ==
A detailed description of Kaila Devi is given in the SkandaPurana in the 65th Adhyaya, wherein the goddess is said to have proclaimed that in Kali Yuga her name would be "Kaila" and she would be worshipped as Kaileshwari by her devotees. Furthermore, the Vedas say that in Kali Yuga, the worship of Kaila Devi will grant immediate fulfillment.

The temple is dedicated to the worship of Kaila Devi as Mahalakshmi and as Mahayogini. Kaila Devi is revered as a manifestation of the same divine being who was born as the daughter of Nanda and Yashoda. According to the guidance of Lord Vishnu, she was exchanged with the infant Lord Krishna. When King Kansa attempted to harm the child, she revealed her divine form and proclaimed that the one he sought to destroy was already beyond his reach, safe and protected.

The arrival of the goddess's likeness to this destination is a fascinating story. The statue was being carried on a bullock cart by a Yogi baba, fleeing from Nagarkot, to protect it. Kaila Devi meanwhile appeared to the sage Kedargiri assuring him that she would come to the people of the area. The Yogi's sole bullock stopped in the central part of the hill amid the dense forest and refused to budge. By divine ordinance the statue was established at that very place.

With the blessings of Kaila Devi, the chandravanshi Jadaun rulers of Karauli have always maintained a deep connection with the temple.

Maharaja Gopal Singh Ji laid the foundation of the temple in 1723 and the work was completed in 1730. He also established the statue of ChamundaJi, bringing it from the fort of Gagraun where it had been placed by the Khinchi ruler Mukund Das Ji in 1150.

Arjun Pal Ji built a large Kund, which exists to this date and was one of the earliest large-scale, man-made sources of water in the area.

In 1927 Maharaja Bhom Pal Ji had improved roads constructed and established a power house. In 1947, Maharaja Ganesh Pal Ji had both the interior and exterior of the temple refurbished in marble. The current Maharaja, Krishna Chandra Pal Ji has also made several radical improvements and added multiple modern facilities. The courtyard has been expanded, and several additions made including the administrative block, the staff quarters, the Annapurna Canteen, a large pandal for waiting devotees, and demarcated channels to implement queues for darshan. New dharamshalas, Ram Bhavan and KansalBhavan, Mathurvaishy Dham have been built and some existing ones-SitaBhavan, Ratan Devi and the DholpurDharamshalahave been reconstructed.

Furthermore, under the aegis of the Kaila Devi Charitable Trust a hundred-bed hospital, the Kaila Devi Senior Secondary School with about 900 students, and a student's hostel have been set up and are progressing rapidly. A large dam on the Kalisil river has been repaired and expanded and two smaller dams have been constructed downstream.

== Design ==
It is a marble structure with a large courtyard and a checkered floor. Two statues are inside the temple. One is of Kaila Devi and one is of Chamunda Devi. They sit together. The larger is of Kaila Devi. Her head is slightly bent.

This temple consist of the palace of the Maharaja in its background.

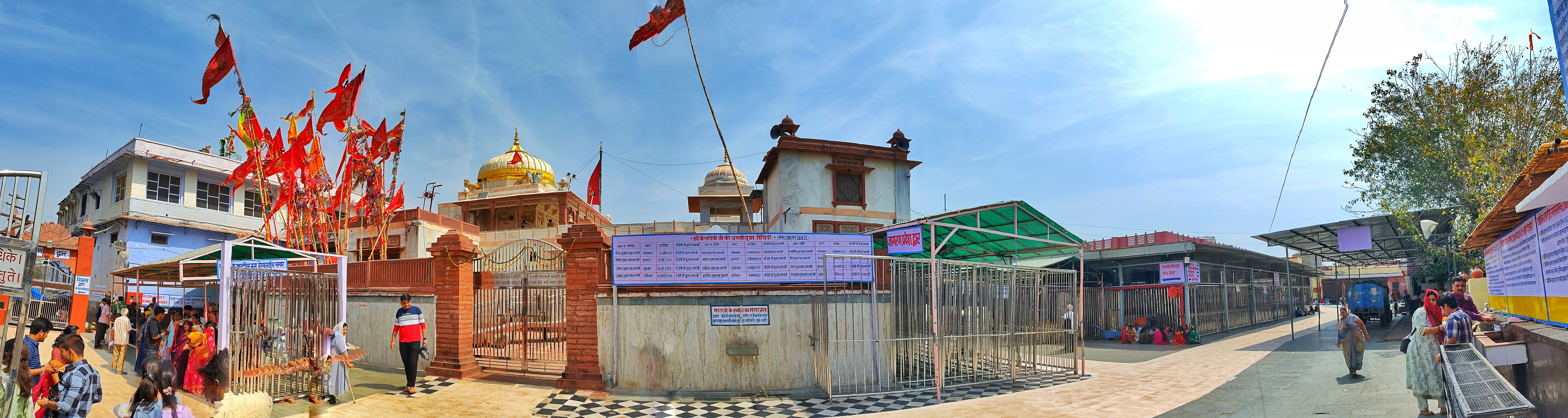
Panorama of Temple in 2024

== Festival ==
The annual festival of Kaila Devi is held at the village during Chaitra (Mar-Apr), lasting for a fortnight. Another attraction is the small temple dedicated to Bhairon, situated in the courtyard. Facing the shrine of Kaila Devi is a temple of Hanuman locally called 'Languriya'.

== Access ==
Gangapur city is the nearest major railway station. Hindaun and Mahaveer Ji are other minor stations.

The site is approachable by road from Karauli, Hindaun City, Gangapur city and Shri Mahavirji. During the fair, RSRTC and private operators provide bus services and thousands of other vehicles to manage the flux of pilgrims.

The nearest airport is Jaipur Airport (170 km).

== Climate ==
In summer from April to June the temperature reaches a maximum of 47 °C. and in winter season it reaches 12 °.
