= Pilauda =

Maa Lahakod Devi Temple

Coordinates: 26°36′N 76°50′E

Pilauda is a village in the district of Gangapur City, Tehsil being Wazirpur in the state of Rajasthan of republic of India. The village is one of the largest in the district. The village has a population of more than 6,038 the majority of them being tribal (Meena), with over 2,000 houses.

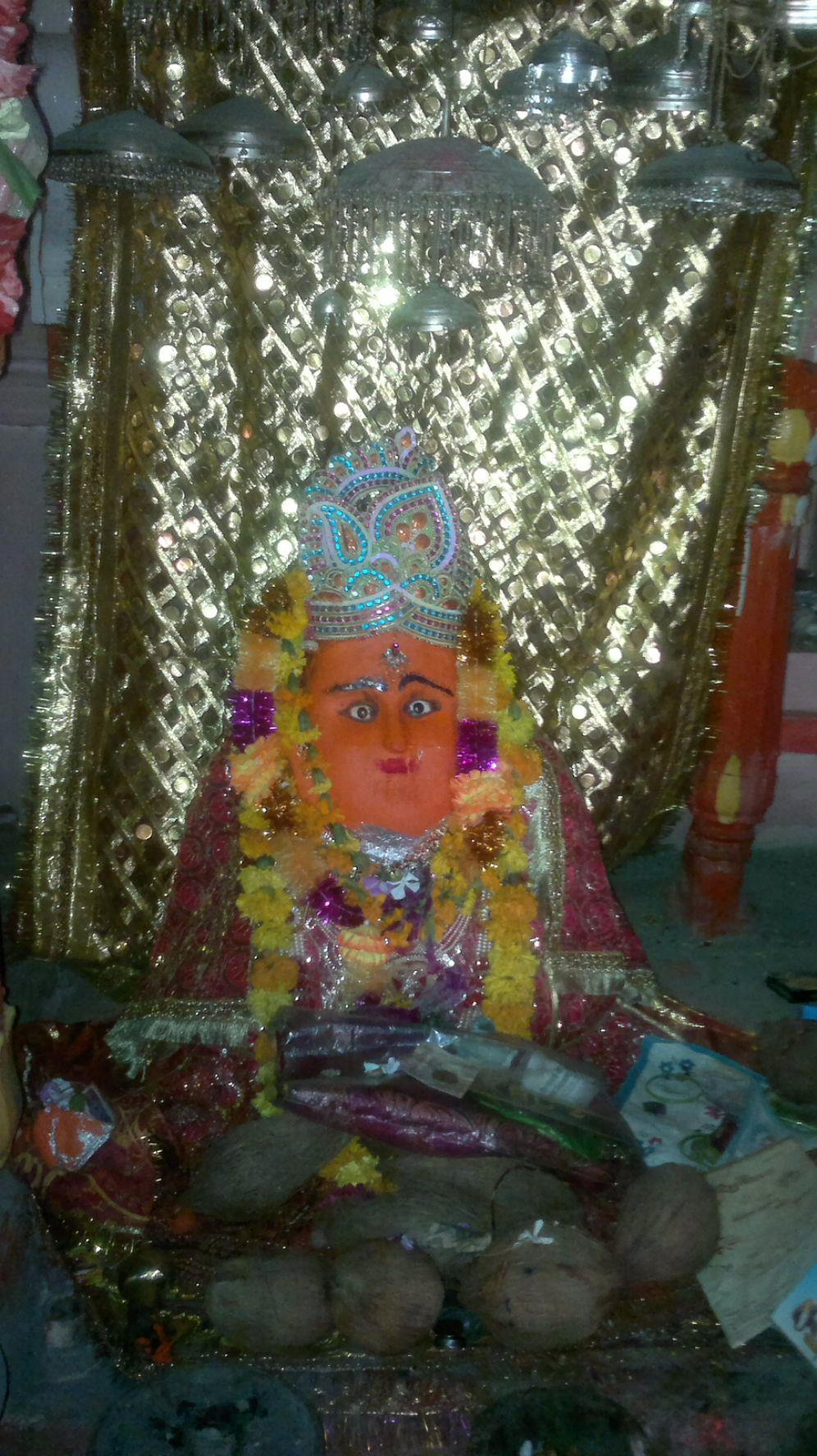
Maa Lahkod Devi Temple

The village exhibits typical features of the tribal villages of Rajasthan. It has a number of satellite puras which are small constellations of houses in the radial settlement fashion. It is well connected through rail and road having its own broad gauge railway station located between Shri Mahavirji and Gangapur city Railway Station. The pilgrimage site of Ma Lahkod Devi has its holy pond nearby attracting crowd of devotees, especially during the month of April on the day of Durgaastmi and Shri Ram Navami, as a local fair is organized with a number of inter-village competitions such as wrestling or kushti, camel race, bull race, swimming, and cycling. There are a huge number of devotees of Ma lahkod, a number of whom give tilakdanda by lying prostrate, making lines with their hands in that position, advancing up to the line drawn and repeating this procedure till they reach the temple, from their homes.

The economy of the village is centered on agriculture and allied activities. About half of the agricultural land of the village lies in the command area of the canal of Panchna Dam located on the outskirts of the city of Karauli.

Recent years the village is fighting with a paucity of water as waters of Panchna canal has been held by Rajasthan government for undisclosed reasons. This is creating adversity for vulnerable section of farmers of Pilauda and other villages of Command area. With time the village has transformed remarkably, especially in the field of education having a number of schools, with some them being up to senior secondary level. The village represents a well-knit unit of several castes residing in it including Mina, Brahmins, Vaishya, and Dalit and Muslims. Athiti Devo bhav motto of India is truly followed here. The village boasts of number of engineering graduates including those from Indian Institute of Technology.

== Culture ==
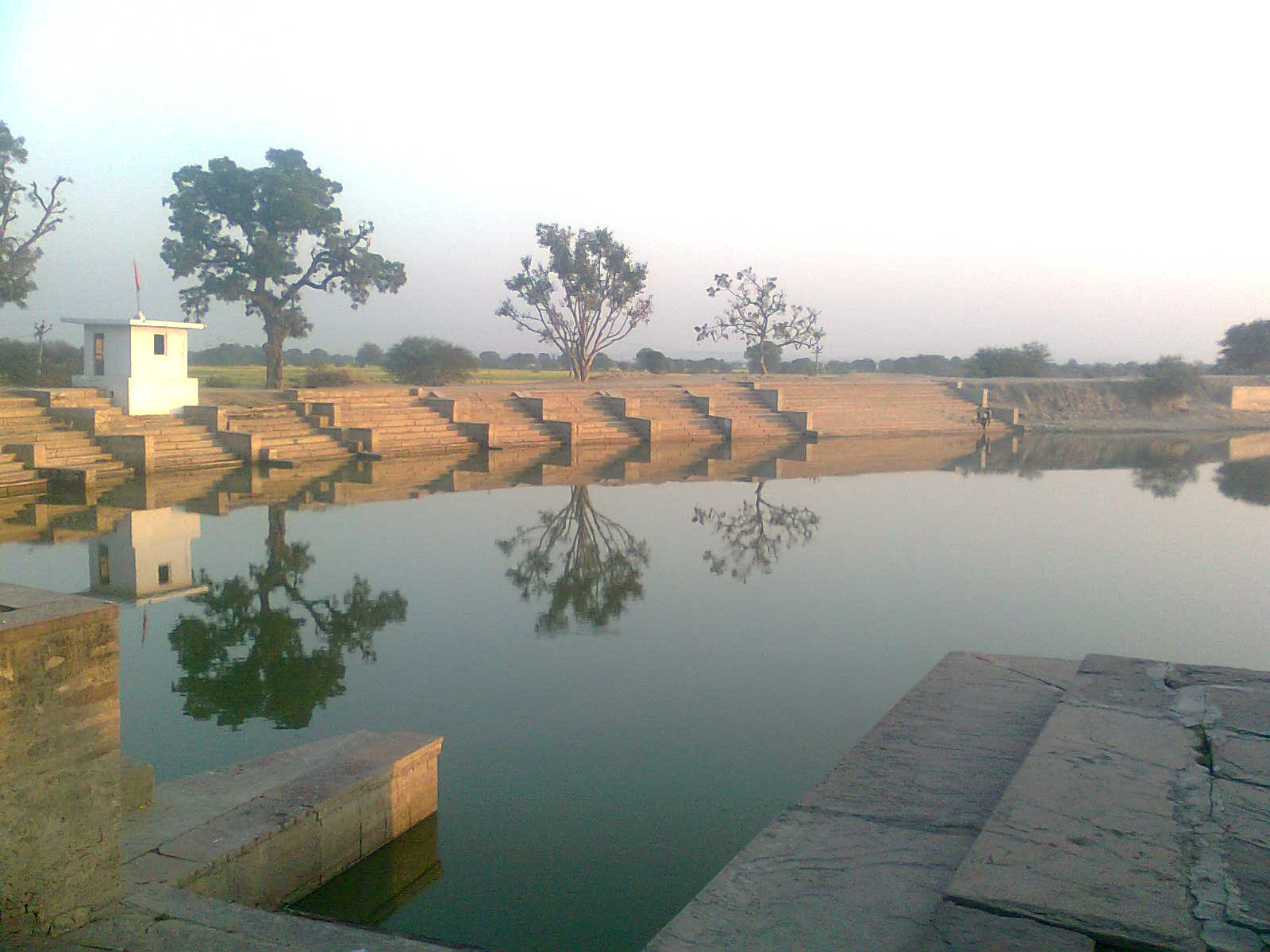
Holy Pond Lahkod.

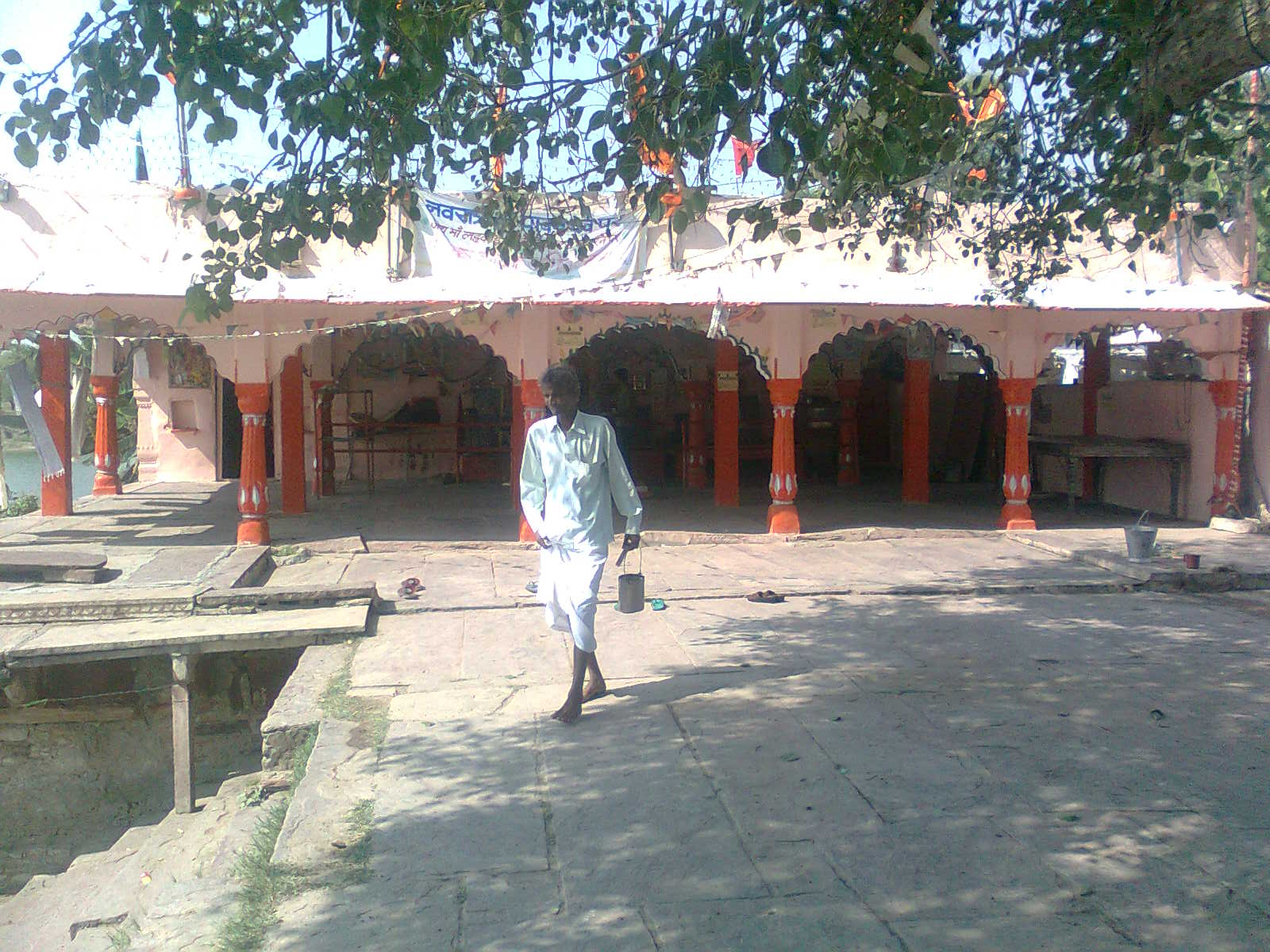
Maa Lahkod Devi Temple

Culturally village hosts no. of Dangal (competition) of kirtan, kanhiyas and pada, which are local variants of the bhakti movement. Diwali and the Fair of Shri Lahkod Devi are the major occasion of festivities. Temple of Shri Lahkod Devi, the elder sister of Maa Kaila devi is major Temple and is center of major religious and public activities of village. The pond near temple is used for bath purpose by the male members of village. The houses exhibits a no. of tribal features including Mandna on the Floor made of mud and buffalo dung Traditional dress worn by male members of village include Dhoti of about 5 meters in length and 1.5 meters in breadth and is of white colour, Kurta which is long and is generally of white colour with a long towel like cloth called Angochi around the neck. Old m generally sport moustache and wear no or very less jewellery. While women wear traditional ghagra, a blouse which is now being given up in favour of a short shirt along with long translucent rectangular plain cloth of about 3×1.3 m worn over head, it is called lugadi in local dialect. One of the uses of lugadi is to make purdah by women in front of males who are senior to their husband as a mark of respect, as widely prevalent in rest of Rajasthan. Woman wear heavy silver bracelets on arms and a similar heavy silver anklet called kaludya.

With the village culture being exposed to the outside world, the purdah system is being diluted, which is in fact a sign of a modern society.

Recent caste panchyat of mina villages of the area in March 2011 has prohibited alcohol consumption and gambling, making it an offense, which shall attract a fine of Rs 51000.

== Geography ==
Geographically village has black soil in the maad area in western part and yellow soil in the eastern part. A number of farm-ponds have been built by the people to meet the increasing demand of water for irrigation. This represents the best example of water harvesting in the dry state of Rajasthan. Important crops include oilseeds, bajra, wheat. The village has huge mud mound of height about hundred meters in the eastern side which now has a small market catering to the needs of the village.

The village faces a problem of drinking water as water in the wells is hard and not fit to be consumed.

Due to withholding of water from Pancha Dam, the irrigation has become a major question in the front of the farmers.

== Telecommunication ==
Std Code:07463
The village has BTS of major telecommunication companies including that of BSNL, Airtel, Vodafone, Reliance, and Jio. Land line telephones are also available, though the village still lacks Internet Broadband connectivity. Direct to home, DTH connections in the village are also rising.

== Health ==
The village has one Primary Health Center, one Ayurvedic Hospital and many private practitioners catering their own and neighboring villages like Kherli, Baglai, Kishorpur, Chhoti Udei, Khareda, and Mahanandpur(Dodya) health requirement. These Primary Health Centres have been sanctioned to MBBS doctors' post, however they seldom visit.

== Religious places ==
In a meeting of village headmen, it was decided to construct newer abode for mother Lahkod, the symbol of village. The salaried personnel of the village have been appealed to donate a month's salary for this higher cause. It was also appealed that farmers shall contribute their non grain produce for this. Donation from outside personnel are also welcome.

- Maa Lahkod Devi Temple
- Hanuman Ji's temple, known as "Bai Ki Kothi Wale Hanumanji"
- Veer hanuman, Deity of the station Darwaj
- Hanuman Deity of Lahkod Darwaza
- Hanuman Deity of Society Darwaza
- Bhaironji Baba Temple
- Shiruwada Baba Temple
- Pathan Baba Deity
- Pathan Baba Deity
- Bhurekhan Baba Deity
- Kareel Baba
- Narsingh Bhagwan Temple in the centre of the village
- Shri Mahavir Jain Temple in Lakkad Pada, station Darwaza
- Old Shiv Mandir
- Khareda Baba
