= Gavda Meena =

Gavda Meena is a locality in Hindaun in Karauli district.
