= Hindaun Assembly constituency =

Legislative Assembly constituency in Rajasthan State, India

Coordinates: 26.74°N 77.03°E

Hindaun
- Constituency No. 82 for the Rajasthan Legislative Assembly

Constituency details
- Country: India
- Region: North India
- State: Rajasthan
- District: Karauli
- Lok Sabha constituency: Karauli–Dholpur
- Established: 1951
- Total electors: 276,907
- Reservation: SC

Member of Legislative Assembly
- 16th Rajasthan Legislative Assembly
- Incumbent Anita Jatav
- Party: Indian National Congress
- Elected year: 2023

Hindaun Assembly constituency is one of the 200 Legislative Assembly constituencies of Rajasthan state in India. It is in Karauli district and is reserved for candidates belonging to the Scheduled Castes. It is a part of the Karauli-Dholpur (Lok Sabha constituency).

The constituency covers all voters from Hindaun tehsil.

== Members of the Legislative Assembly ==
Year	Name	Party
1951	Riddhi Chandra	Indian National Congress
1957	Chhanega	Indian National Congress
1962	Sharwan Lal Jatav	Jana Sangh
1967	Sharwan Lal Jatav	Bharatiya Jana Sangh
1972	Umedi Lal Jatav	Bharatiya Jana Sangh
1977	Sharwan Lal Jatav	Janata Party
1980	Bharosi Lal Jatav	Janata Party
1985	Umedi Lal Jatav	Indian National Congress
1990	Bharosi Lal Jatav	Janata Dal
1993	Kamal Ram Koli	Bharatiya Janata Party
1998	Bharosi Lal Jatav	Indian National Congress
2003	Kalu Ram Jatav	Indian National Lok Dal
2008	Bharosi Lal Jatav	Indian National Congress
2013	Rajkumari Jatav	Bharatiya Janata Party
2018	Bharosi Lal Jatav	Indian National Congress
2023	Anita Jatav	Indian National Congress

== Election results ==
=== 2023 ===
2023 Rajasthan Legislative Assembly election: Hindaun
Party	Candidate	Votes	%	±%
INC	Anita Jatav	91,627	48.89	−7.4
BJP	Rajkumari Jatav	53,351	28.47	−13.42
BSP	Brajesh Kumar Jatav	29,777	15.89	
JJP	Gayatri Koli	6,372	3.4	
Bahujan Shoshit Samaj Sangharsh Samta Party	Kusum Lata	1,782	0.95	
NOTA	None of the above	1,686	0.9	−0.05
Majority		38,276	20.42	+6.02
Turnout		187,418	67.68	−6.03
INC hold		Swing		

=== 2018 ===
Rajasthan Legislative Assembly Election, 2018: Hindaun
Party	Candidate	Votes	%	±%
INC	Bharosi Lal	104,694	56.29	
BJP	Manju Khairwal	77,914	41.89	
NOTA	None of the above	1,761	0.95	
Majority		26,780	14.4	
Turnout		185,998	73.71	

== See also ==
- List of constituencies of the Rajasthan Legislative Assembly
- Hindaun City
- Karauli District
- Educational institutions in Hindaun Subdivision
