= Jachcha ki Baori =

Stepwell at Hindaun, Rajasthan, India

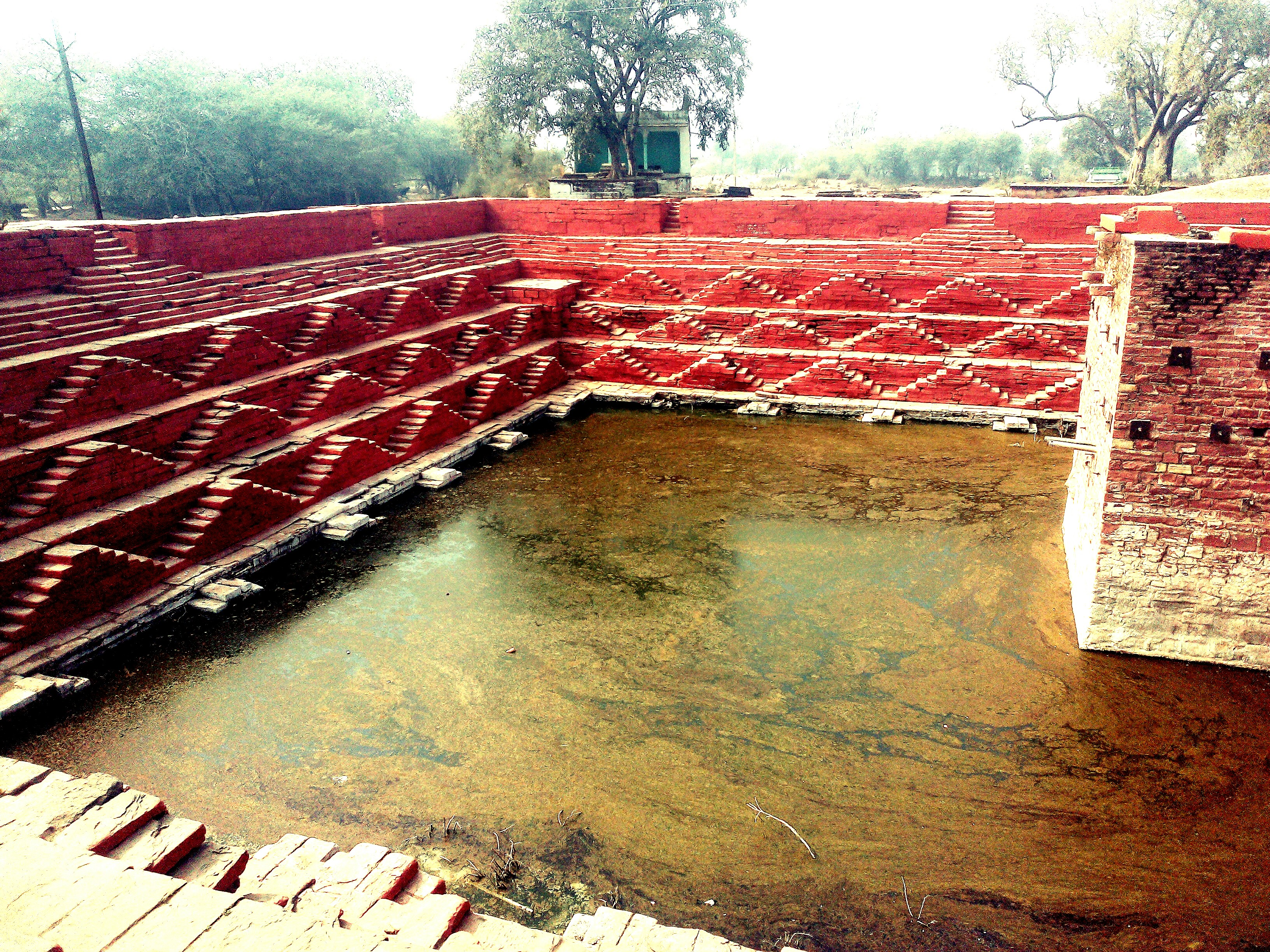
- Inside

General information
- Architectural style: Artistic Stepwell
- Location: Near Narsinghji Temple, Hindaun, Rajasthan, India

Technical details
- Size: 200 square feet

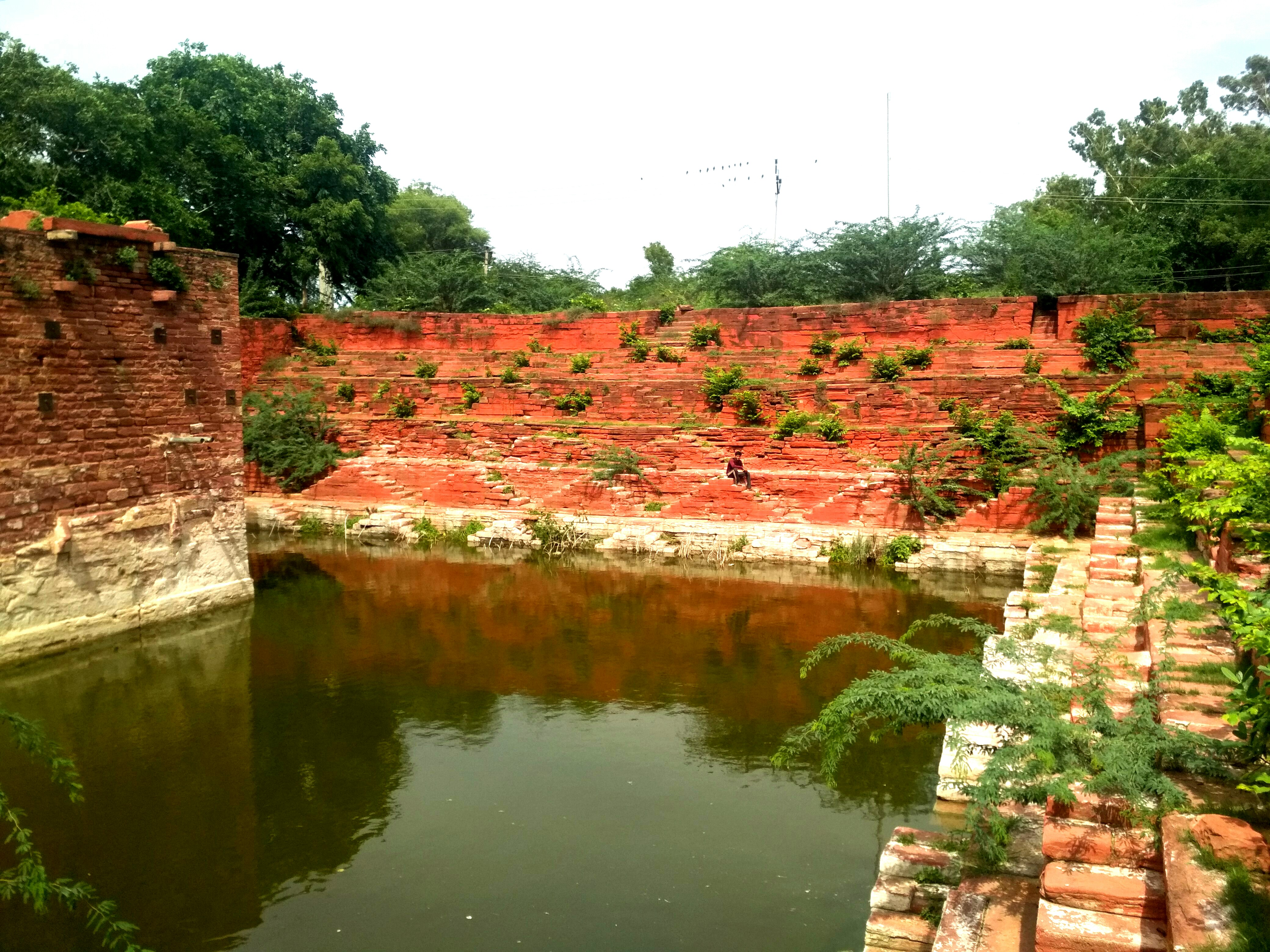
Jachcha ki Baori, Hindaun

Jachcha ki Baori is a large stepwell near the Narsinghji Temple (a Hindu temple in Prahlad Kund located upon the western outskirts of Hindaun in the Indian state of Rajasthan). It is located near the intersection of Prahlad Kund Road and Kharata Road.

== History ==
The stepwell is said to have been built by Bhai Lakhi Rai Banjara. According to legend, no water had appeared during its initial excavation. However, it is rumored a saint had asserted that when a Jachcha (a pregnant woman) gave birth to a child the stepwell filled with water. People report that when the water is drained for cleaning, the stone statue of this woman can be seen lying in the center of the stepwell. This is apparently how the stepwell received its name, Jachcha Ki Baori.

According to folk tradition, the water of this boudi (a Bengali term referring to a married woman, specifically the wife of one's eldest brother) can clean clothing without the use of soap.

== Structure ==
There is no question that the construction of this stepwell was deliberately done in an artistic manner. Stairs to reach the water at its bottom are prominent in the 200 square foot stepwell. For reasons unknown, its four corners each have a pillar. In addition to the statue of a reclining Jachcha, found within the stepwell is an explanation of how the land was irrigated, as well as an ancient house which now resembles a crescent.

The Rajasthan state government repaired the stepwell in 2017 as part of a drive for water conservation.
