= Hindaun Fort =

Fort in Karauli, Rajasthan, India

- Part of Hindaun
- Hindaun, Rajasthan, India
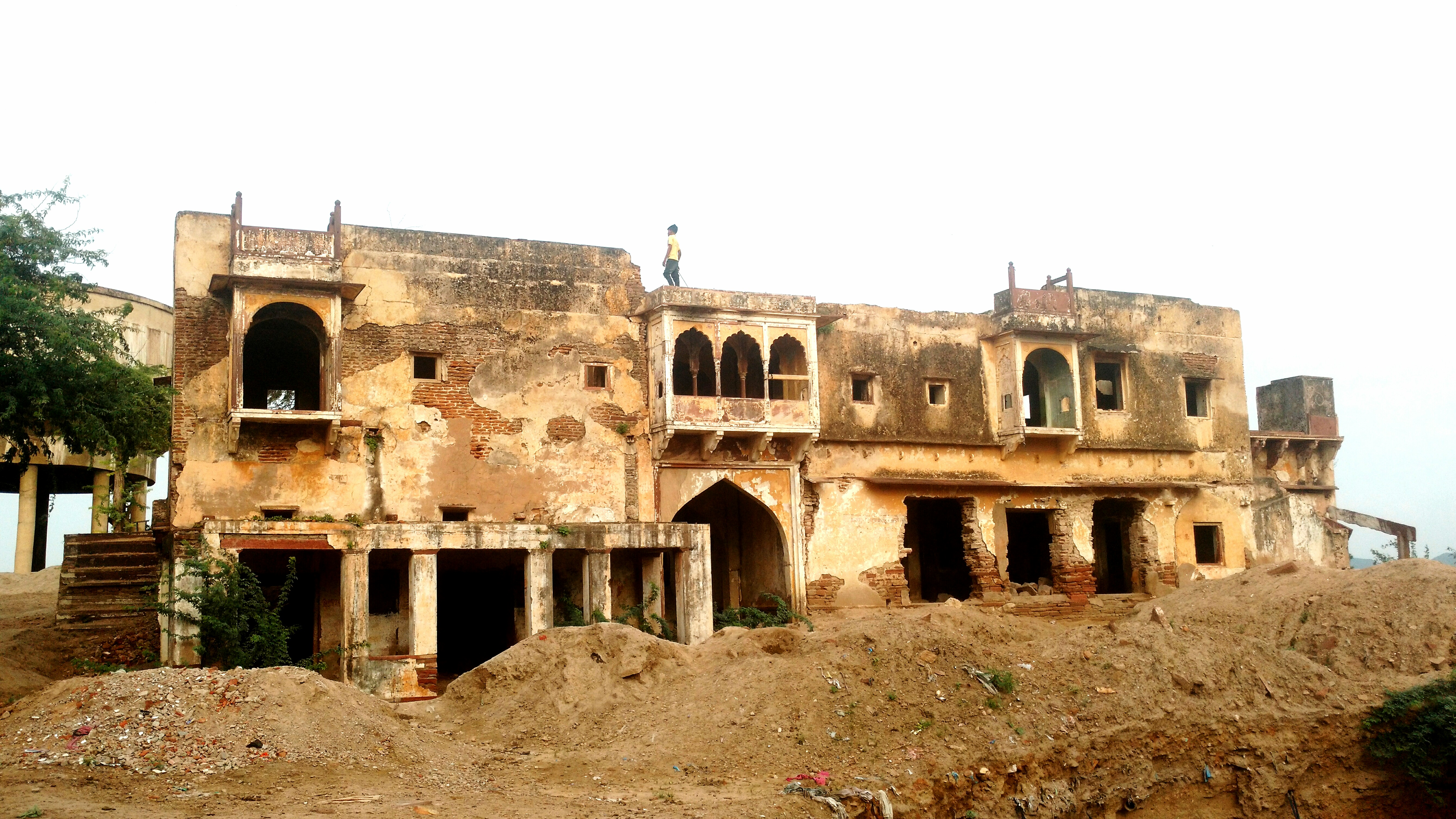
- front view of the Palace

Site information
- Type: Fort and Palace
- Controlled by: None
- Open to the public: Yes
- Condition: Poor

Location
- Location within Rajasthan
- Coordinates: 26.7303°N 77.0391°E

Site history
- Built by: Dagur clan of Jats
- Materials: Red sandstone, lime and marble

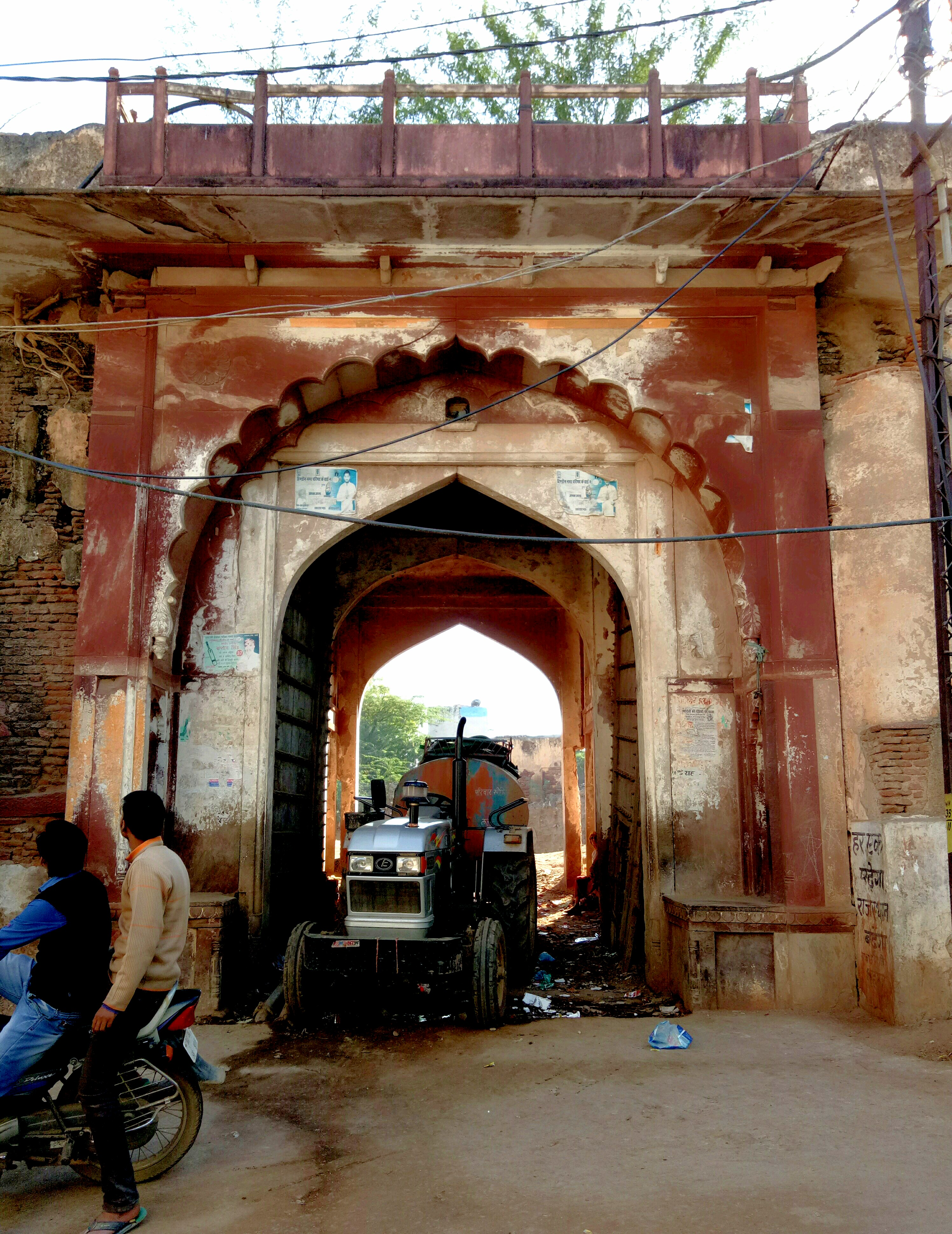
Gateway of Fort

Hindaun Fort is a fort in the area of Hindaun in Karauli District of the Indian state of Rajasthan. The Fort was built by the Dagur clan of Jats who carved out a principality around Hindaun from the Mughal Empire.

== History ==
The Hindaun Fort, situated in the Karauli District of Rajasthan, holds significant historical importance from the medieval era. Due to its strategic location, it served as a critical site for regional control and defense. The fort became a key stronghold for the Dagur clan of Jats, who used it as a defensive base against Mughal advances. Throughout its history, the fort has been a witness to numerous battles and sieges, highlighting its role in the region's resistance against Mughal expansion and its tumultuous past in the broader history of Rajasthan.

== Architecture ==
Hindaun Fort is built of locally quarried red sandstone laid in regular courses with lime mortar. Its perimeter is defined by high ramparts punctuated by seven octagonal bastions, rising up to 20 m high with stepped merlons that provided cover for defenders. The main gateway features a horseshoe shaped arch framed by carved floral panels and flanked by robust guard chambers, while smaller side gates allowed discreet troop movements. Within the walls, vestiges of a palace block remain, including vaulted chambers and marble‑lined niches. Decorative elements such as corbelled eaves, machicolations and jharokha-style balconies were drawn from the broader Rajput architectural vocabulary.

== Gallery ==
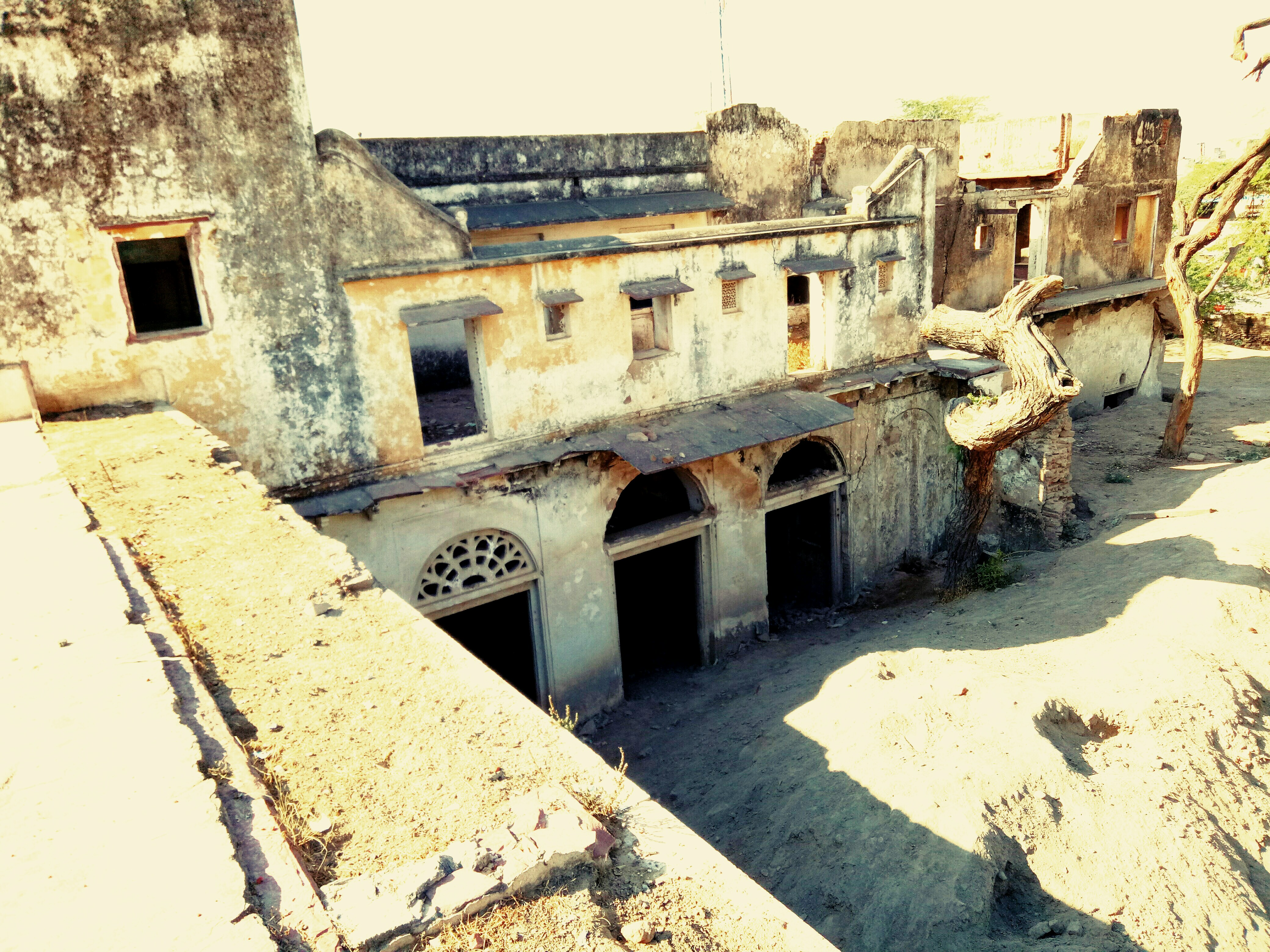
Insider view

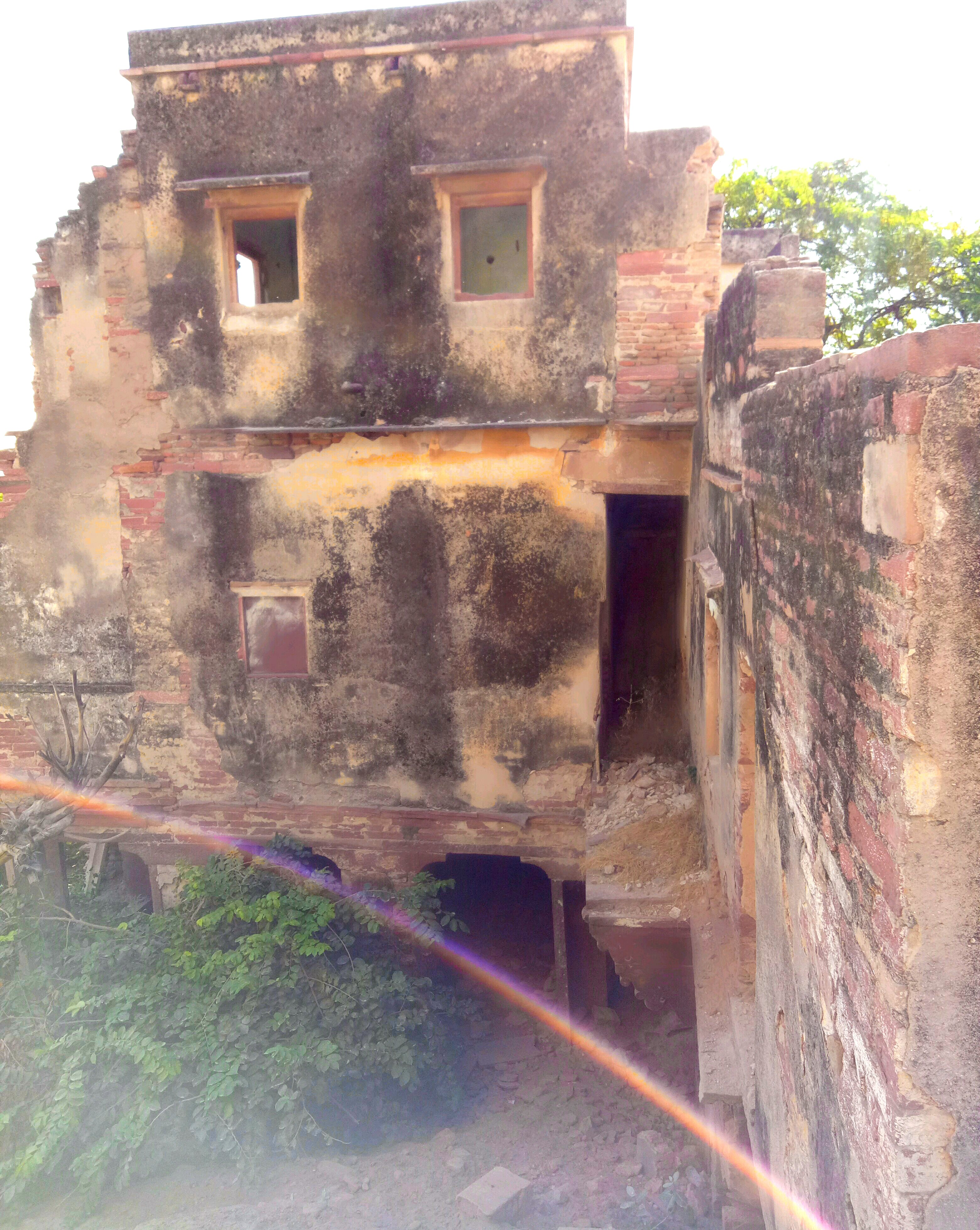
Back side view

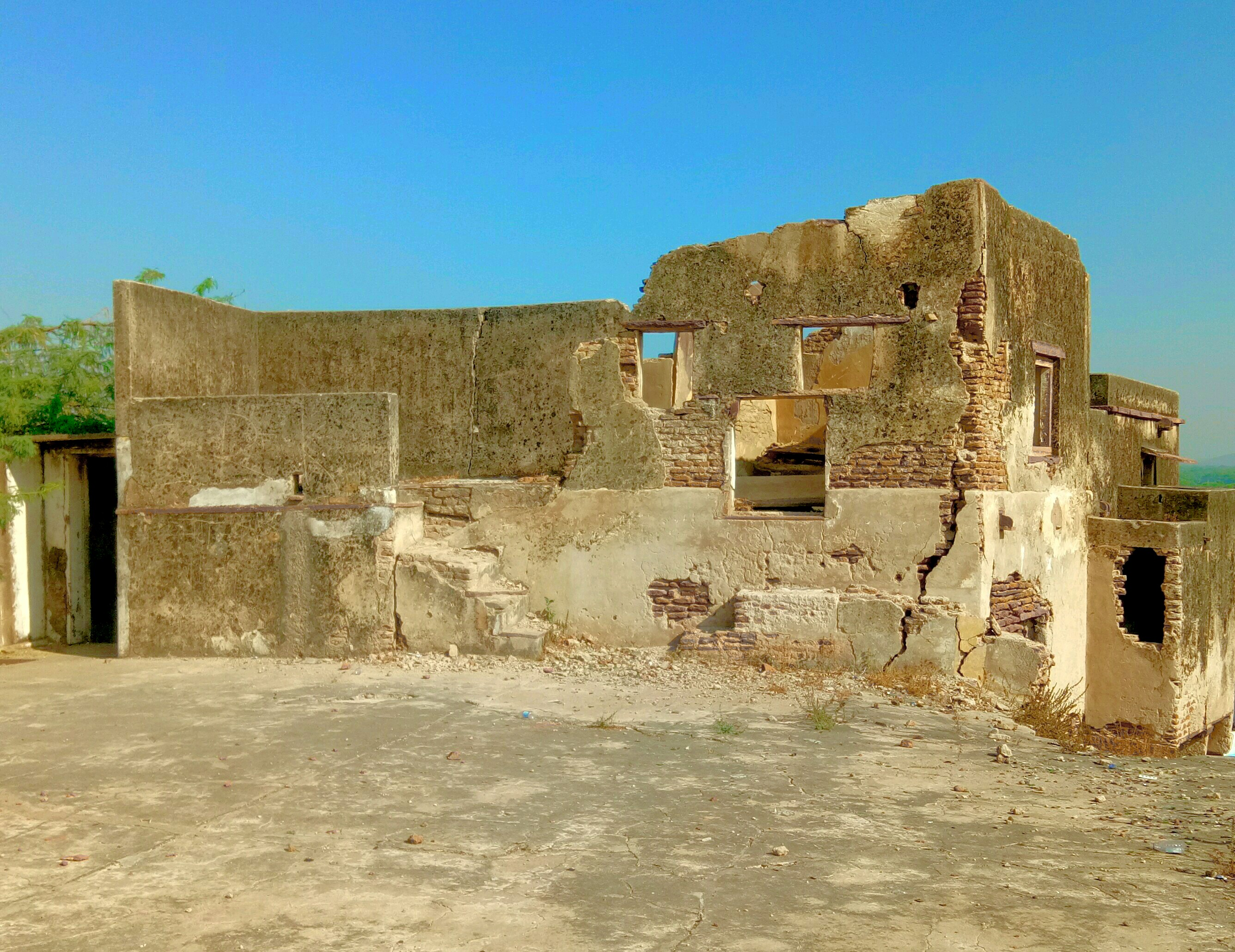
Top floor view

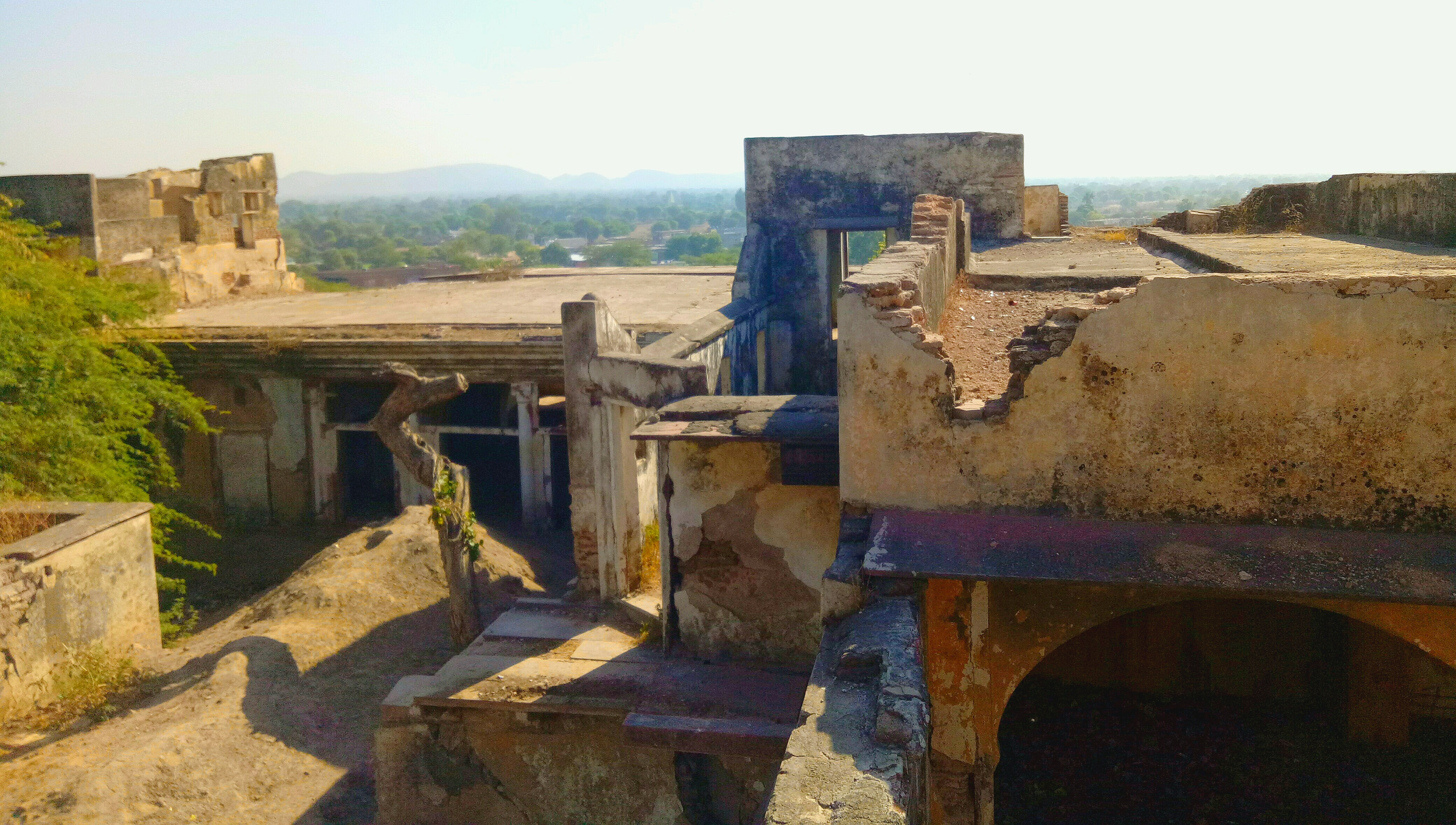
Side view
