= Bharosi Lal Jatav =

Indian politician

Minister of State, Government of Rajasthan
- In office 2 March 2009 – 16 November 2011
- Chief Minister: Ashok Gahlot
- Ministry and Departments: Estate (I/C); Agriculture; Animal Husbandry; Fisheries; Rajasthan State Motor Garage

Member of Rajasthan Legislative Assembly
- In office 2018–2023
- Preceded by: Rajkumari Jatav
- Succeeded by: Anita Jatav
- In office 2008–2013
- Preceded by: Kaluram Yadav
- Succeeded by: Rajkumari Jatav
- In office 1998–2003
- Preceded by: Kamal Ram Koli
- Succeeded by: Kaluram Yadav
- In office 1990–1992
- Preceded by: Ummedi Lal Jatav
- Succeeded by: Kamal Ram Koli
- In office 1980–1985
- Preceded by: Shravanlal
- Succeeded by: Ummedi Lal Jatav
- Constituency: Hindaun

District Head Karauli
- In office 2005–2008

Personal details
- Born: 2 August 1948 (age 78) Jhirna, Karauli, Rajasthan, India
- Party: Indian National Congress (Till November 2023 suspended)
- Spouse: Resham Devi (m. 1960)
- Children: 7
- Parent(s): Tek Ram Jatav (father); Champa Devi Jatav (mother)
- Occupation: Politician
- Profession: Agriculture

Bharosi Lal Jatav (born 2 August 1948) is an Indian politician. He was elected to the Rajasthan Legislative Assembly for five terms from Hindaun, Rajasthan. He previously also served as Minister of State in the Government of Rajasthan. He is a member of the Indian National Congress (Till November 2023 suspended).

== Early life and education ==
Bharosi Lal Jatav was born on 2 August 1948 in Jhirna village, in present-day Karauli district, Rajasthan, to Tekaram Jatav and Champa Devi Jatav. He completed his schooling at Government High School, Hindaun City, passing the High School examination in 1965.

== Personal life ==
Jatav married Resham Devi on 28 April 1960. The couple have five sons and two daughters. His occupation is agriculture.

== Political career ==
Jatav has been active in Rajasthan politics and is associated with the Indian National Congress. He served as treasurer of the Rajasthan Lok Dal between 1980 and 1985, and subsequently held organizational positions in the Congress, including district general secretary and president of its Scheduled Caste cell in the former Sawai Madhopur district.

He was elected to the Rajasthan Legislative Assembly from the Hindaun constituency in 1980, 1990, 1998, 2008 and 2018. He represented the constituency in the seventh, ninth, eleventh, thirteenth and fifteenth Rajasthan Legislative Assemblies.

In 2005, he became the chairman (Zila Pramukh) of Karauli Zila Parishad, serving until 2008.

On 2 March 2009, Jatav was appointed Minister of State (Independent Charge) in the Government of Rajasthan under Chief Minister Ashok Gehlot. He held responsibility for the Estate Department and also served as Minister of State for Agriculture, Animal Husbandry, Fisheries and Rajasthan State Motor Garage. His ministerial tenure ended on 16 November 2011.

During his legislative career, he also served on several Rajasthan Legislative Assembly committees, including the Scheduled Caste Welfare Committee, the Parliamentary Advisory Committee and the Library Committee.

In the 2018 Rajasthan Legislative Assembly election, he was elected again from Hindaun as a Congress candidate.
