= Kailadevi =

Village in India

- Village
- Location in Rajasthan, India Kailadevi (India)
- Coordinates: 26°20′23″N 76°53′37″E
- Country: India
- State: Rajasthan
- District: Karauli
- Elevation: 245 m (804 ft)

Population (2011)
  - Total: 6,865

Languages
  - Official: Hindi
- Time zone: UTC+5:30 (IST)
- PIN: 322243
- ISO 3166 code: RJ-IN
- Vehicle registration: RJ-

Kailadevi is a village in Karauli Tehsil, in the Karauli District of the Indian state of Rajasthan. It falls under the Bharatpur Division. It is 26 km south of the district center Karauli, and 146 km from the state capital, Jaipur.

== Population ==
According to the 2011 Census of India, the village comprises 1,319 households and has a total population of 6,865, including 3,731 males and 3,134 females.

== Places nearby ==
Nearby villages include:

- Atewa ( 10 km )
- Gerai ( 9 km )
- Semarda ( 11 km )
- Rajor ( 13 km )
- Hariya Ka Mandir ( 12 km )
- Boyikra ( 10 km )

Kailadevi is in Karauli District, with Tehsil and Gangapur City, Tehsil to the North, Bamanwas, Tehsil to the West and Nadauti, Tehsil to the North.

Sabalgarh, Lalsot, Sawai Madhopur and Todabhim are the nearest cities.

== Transport and connectivity ==
Gangapur City Railway Station is the nearest major railway station, 35 km from the village.

== Educational institutions ==
Nearby schools include:

- Government P. G. College Of Karauli
- Pawan A. V. M . Ups Gubreda
- Saups Kaladavi
- Gyandhara Ss Megjeen A
- Hb Aups Keshree Shingh Kepura
