= Rajkumari Jatav =

Indian politician

Member of the Rajasthan Legislative Assembly
- In office 11 December 2013 – 10 December 2018
- Preceded by: Bharosi Lal Jatav
- Succeeded by: Bharosi Lal Jatav
- Constituency: Hindaun

District Head Sawai Madhopur & Karauli
- In office 1995–1998

Personal details
- Party: Bhartiya Janta Party
- Spouse: Bhairon Lal Jatav
- Occupation: Politician

Rajkumari Jatav is an Indian politician. She previously served as member of the Rajasthan Legislative Assembly from Hindaun. She is a member of the Bhartiya Janta Party.

== Career ==
Jatav contested the 2023 Rajasthan Legislative Assembly election in Hindaun but was defeated by Anita Jatav of the Indian National Congress.
