= Shri Raghunath Ji Temple =

Hindu Temple in Rajasthan, India

Raghunath Ji Maharaj

- Location in Rajasthan, India

Religion
- Affiliation: Hinduism
- District: Karauli
- Deity: Ram, Seeta
- Festivals: Diwali, Rama Navami, Dussehra

Location
- Location: Hindaun City
- State: Rajasthan
- Country: India
- Interactive map of Raghunath Ji Maharaj
- Coordinates: 26°43′37″N 77°02′22″E

Architecture
- Creator: Tulsidass Ji
- Completed: 15 century AD

Specifications
- Temple: 2
- Monument: 1

Shri Raghunath Ji Temple is a Hindu temple. It is the ancient temple of Hindaun City. The temple is approximately 650 year old. The temple is located at Tulsipura near Nakkash Ki Devi – Gomti Dham

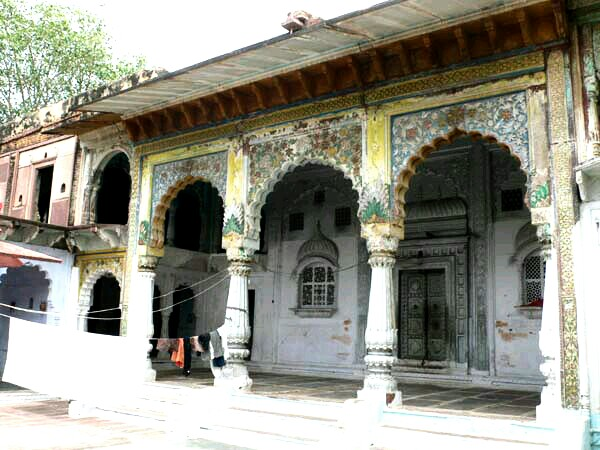

It is situated in the Hindaun City, in the Indian state of Rajasthan. Raghunath ji is a name of Hindu lord of Rama.

Nearest cities is Hindaun (0 km), Karauli (30 km), Gangapur City (43 km). The temple is located near of the Jalsen Reservoir.
