= Nadoti =

Tehsil in the Karauil District, Rajasthan

Nadoti is a Tehsil/Block in the Karauil District of Rajasthan. According to Census 2011 information the sub-district code of Nadoti block is 00521. There are about 96 villages in Nadoti block.
