= Anita Jatav =

Indian politician

Member of the Rajasthan Legislative Assembly
- Incumbent
- Assumed office 3 December 2023
- Preceded by: Bharosi Lal Jatav
- Constituency: Hindaun

Personal details
- Born: 26 November 1984 (age 41) Baroli, Bhusawar Bharatpur, Rajasthan
- Party: Indian National Congress
- Spouse: Vikram Singh Jatav (m. 2003)
- Children: 1
- Parent(s): Tejpal Jatav (father); Sampati Devi Jatav (mother)

Anita Jatav (born 26 November 1984) is an Indian politician. She is member of the Indian National Congress from Karauli district of Rajasthan. She was elected to the 16th Rajasthan Legislative Assembly from Hindaun, Rajasthan.
