= Karauli district =

District of Rajasthan, India

Coordinates: 26°30′00″N 77°01′12″E

- District of Rajasthan
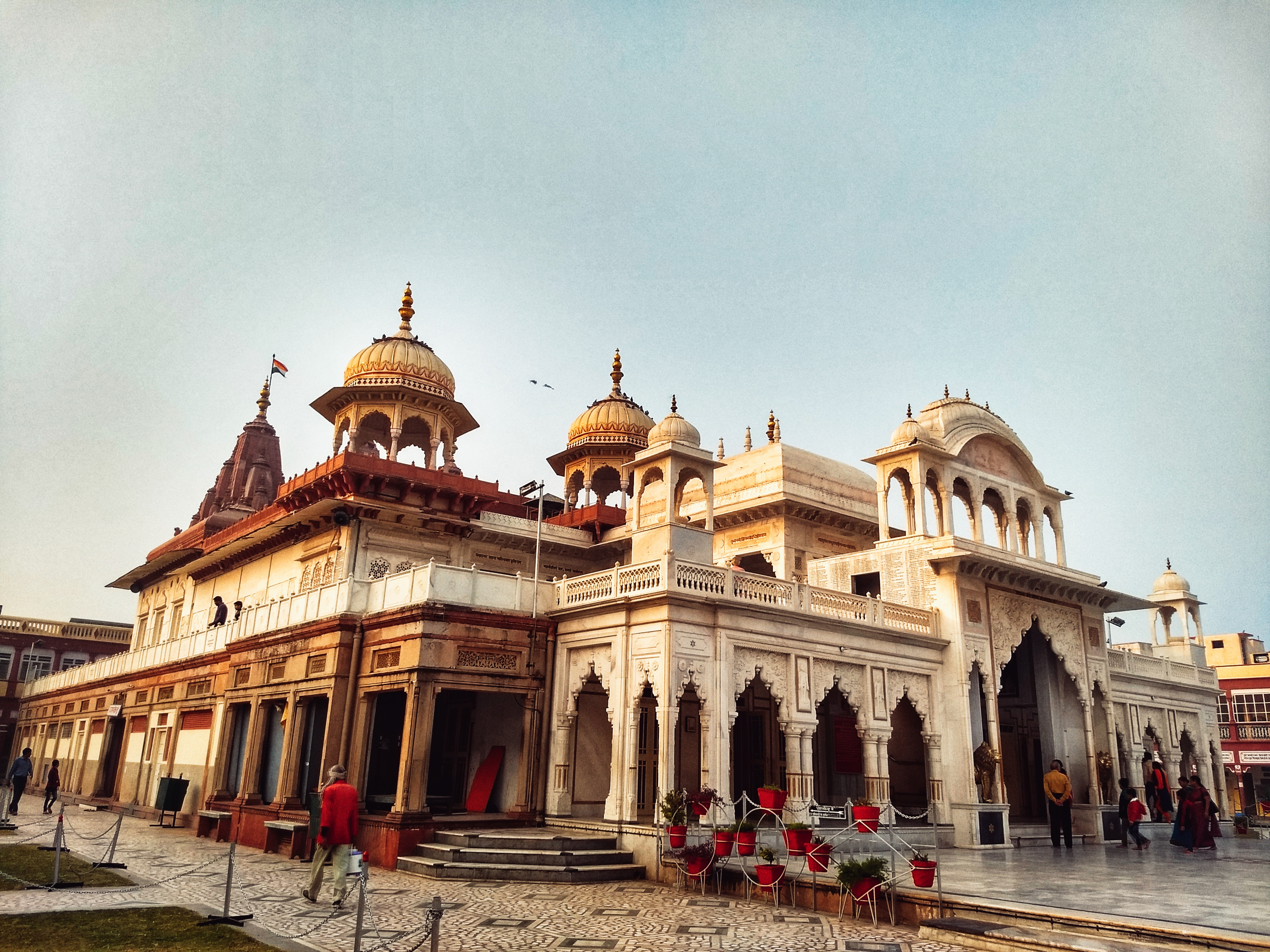
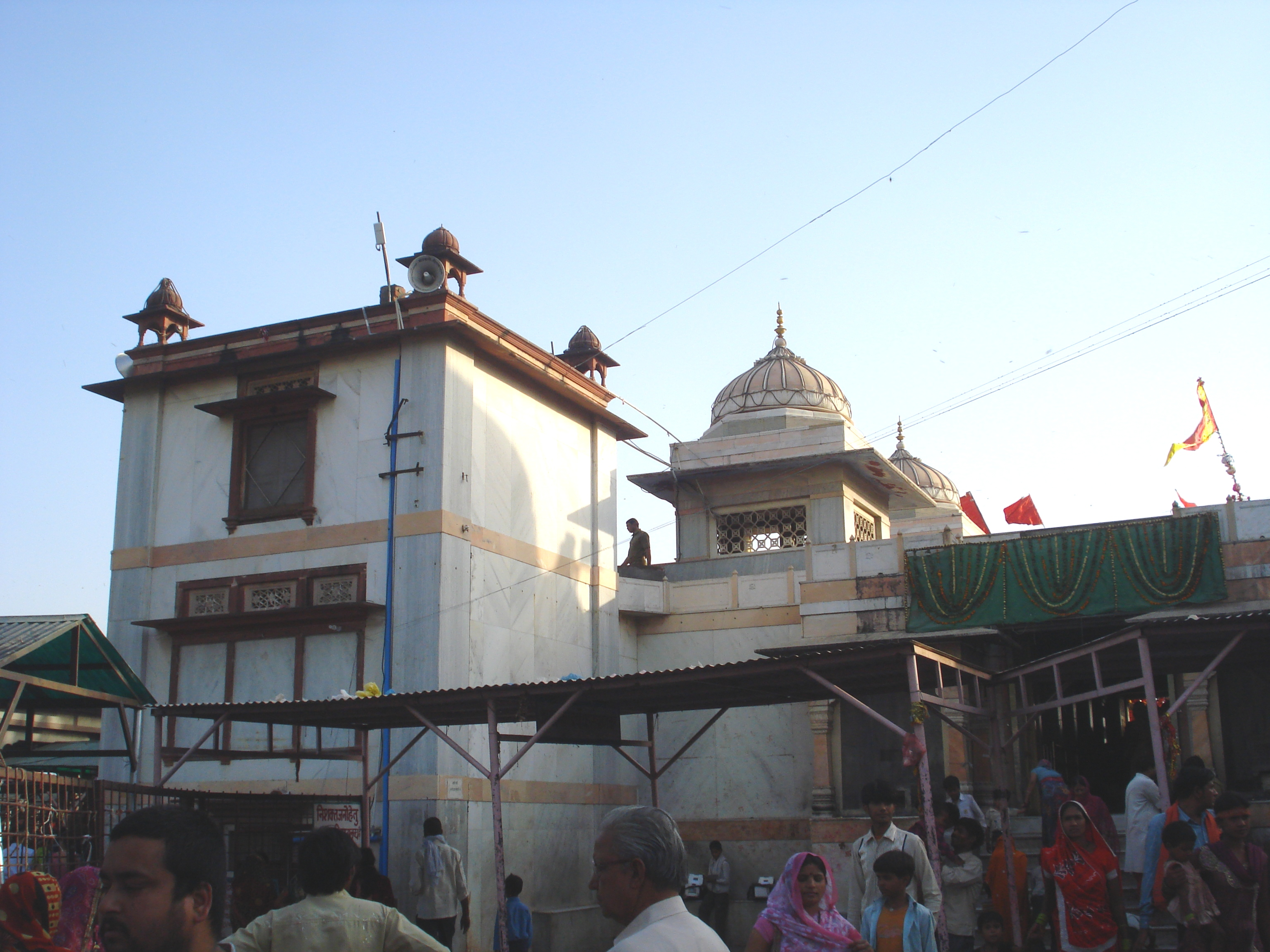
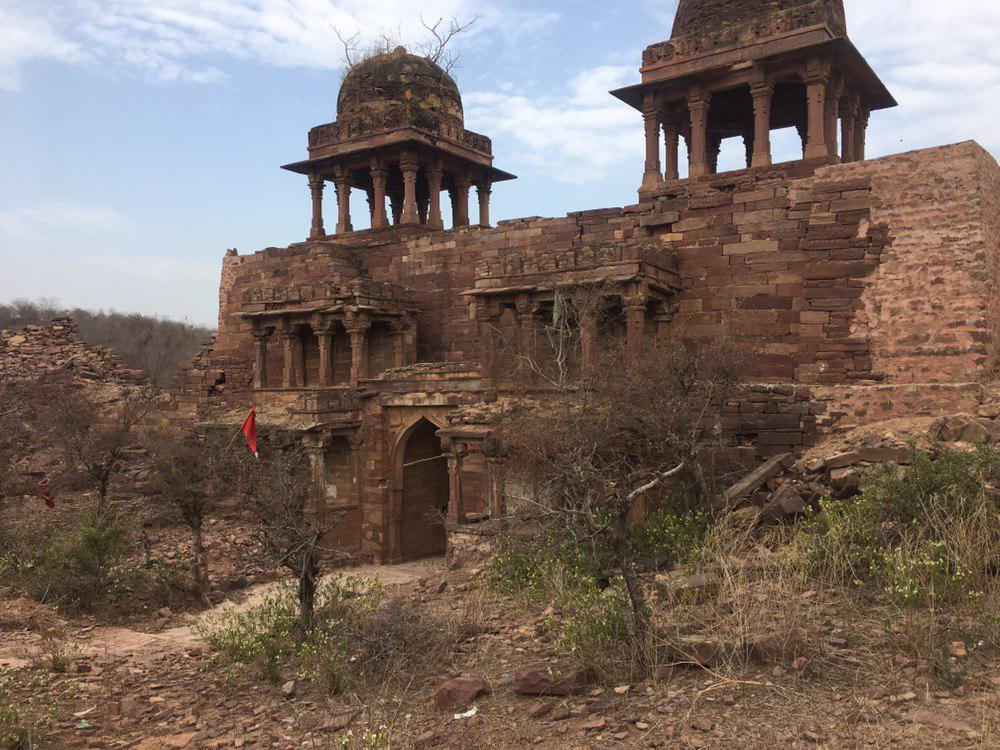
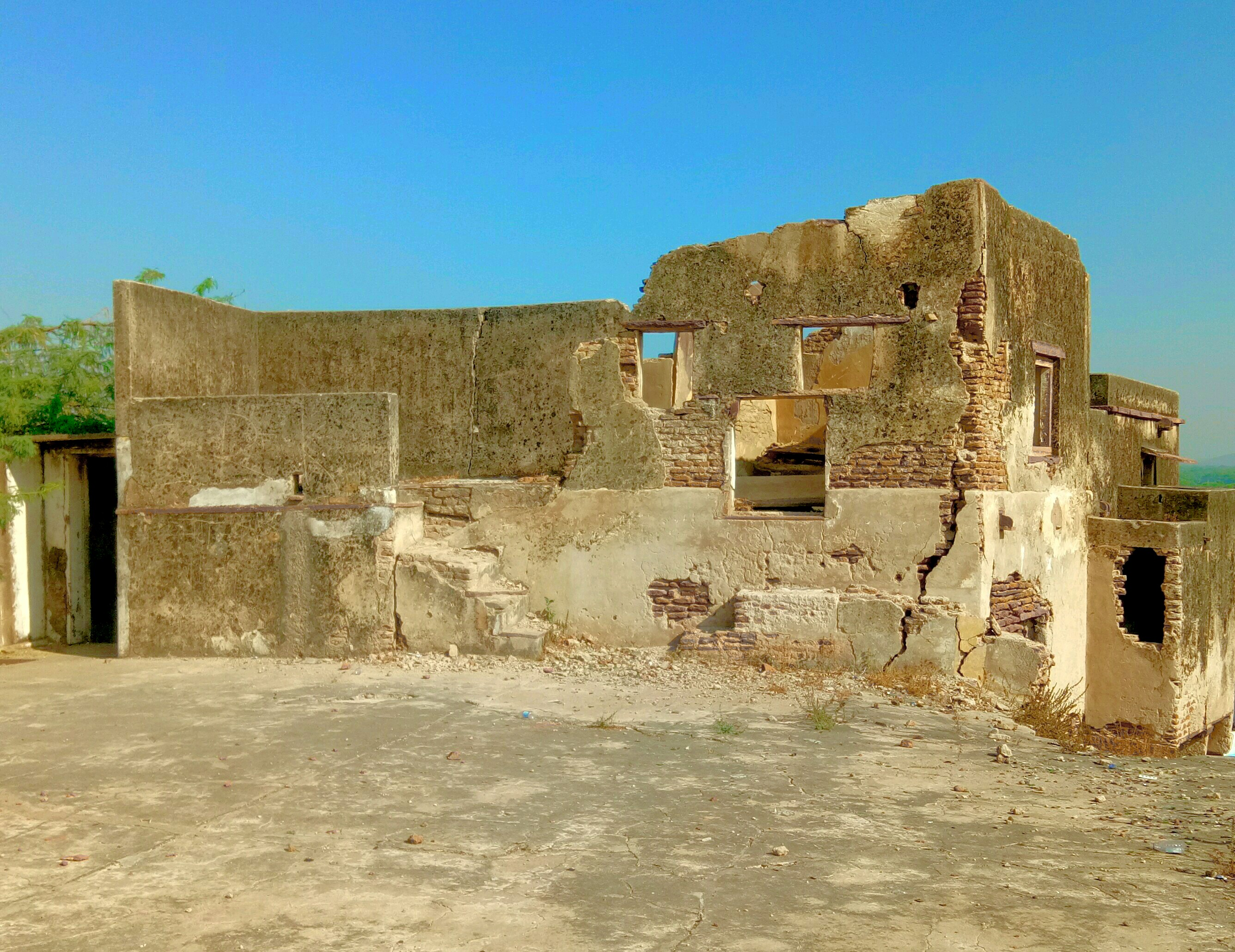
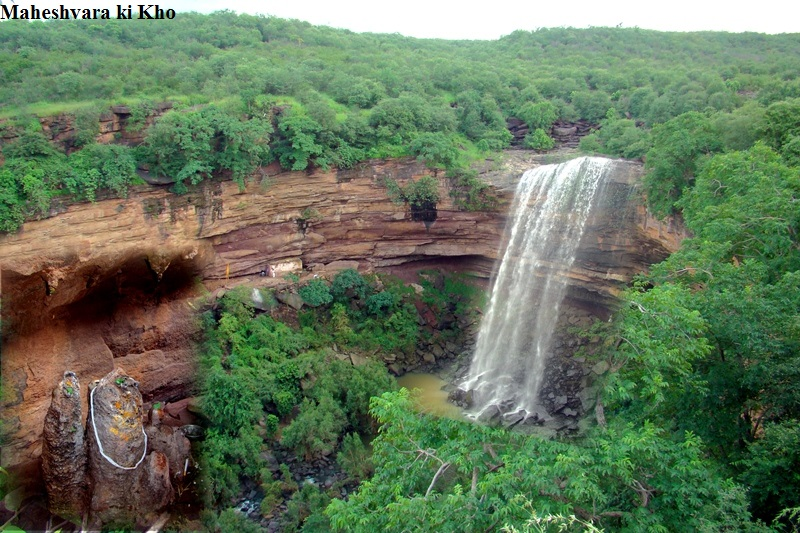
- Clockwise from top-left: Shri Mahaveer Ji temple, Kaila Devi Temple in Karauli, Timangarh Fort, Hindaun Fort, Maheshwara ki Kho

- Location of Karauli district in Rajasthan
- Country: India
- State: Rajasthan
- Division: Bharatpur
- Established: 995 A.D
- Founder: Raja Bijaipal
- Headquarters: Karauli

Government
  - District collector: Neelabh Saxena, IAS
  - Superintendent of Police: Brajesh Jyoti Upadhyay, IPS

Area
  - Total: 5,043 km^{2} (1,947 sq mi)

Population (2011)
  - Total: 1,458,248
  - Density: 289.2/km^{2} (748.9/sq mi)

Demographics
  - Literacy: 66.22
  - Sex ratio: 861

Languages
  - Official: Hindi, Rajasthani
  - Native: Braj Bhasha dialect
- Time zone: UTC+05:30 (IST)
- Website: Karauli District

Karauli district is a district of the state of Rajasthan in western India. karauli district is located in the Braj Bhoomi region. The town of Karauli serves as the administrative headquarters of the district. Karauli district also comes under the Bharatpur Divisional Commissionerate.

The population of Karuali district was 1,458,248 people in the 2011 Indian census, giving a population density of 264 inhabitants per square kilometre (680/sq mi).

== Geography and location ==
Karauli District encompasses an area of 5,043 square kilometres (1,947 sq mi). It is bordered by Dholpur district to the east, Bharatpur district to the northeast, Dausa district to the north, and Sawai Madhopur district to the west. Karauli City is located 169 km (105 mi) from Gwalior, 114 km (71 mi) west of Agra and 158 km (98 mi) from the city of Jaipur.

The Chambal River forms the southeastern boundary of the district with the state of Madhya Pradesh, around 5 kilometres (3.1 mi) away from Mandrayal. Although most of Karauli district is composed of hills and valleys, there are no high mountains, with the highest having an elevation less than 450 metres (1,480 ft) above sea level.

The district also has a forest which covered an area of 172,459 hectares (426,160 acres) in 2011, about 30% of the total geographical area of the district's 504,301 ha (1,246,150 acres).

=== Natural resources ===
Natural resources found in Karauli district include sandstone, masonry stone, silica sand, soapstone, white clay and some iron ore.

=== Topography ===
Karauli district's natural environment includes the Vindhya Range and Aravalli Range. The district has both plains and hilly areas. The plains are fertile and the soil present in the area is lightweight and sandy. There are many rivers in the district.

== Climate ==
The climate in Karauli district is sunny for most of the year, with the average annual high 35 °C (95 °F) and low 23 °C (73 °F). Extreme temperatures have reached 50 °C (122 °F) in May and 0 °C (32 °F) in January. The humidity of Karauli district ranges from 31% to 35% in the dry season with a dew point between 11 °C (52 °F) and 15 °C (59 °F). The annual rainfall is 668.86 mm (26.333 in), falling for an average of 35 days per year, concentrated during the South Asian Monsoon from June to September.

== Tourist attractions ==
- Kaila Devi Temple is a Hindu temple 23 km (14 mi) from Karauli and 37 km (23 mi) from Gangapur City. It is located on the banks of the Kalisil River, a tributary of the Banas River in the hills of Trikut. The temple is dedicated to the tutelary deity, Kaila Devi, of the Jadaun Rajput rulers of Karauli State. The temple is made out of marble has a large courtyard with a checkered floor. Red flags have planted by worshippers in one part of the temple.
- Madan Mohan Temple is a temple dedicated to the Hindu god Krishna.
- Mehandipur Balaji Temple is a mandir dedicated to the Hindu god Hanuman. Its reputation for ritualistic healing and the exorcism of evil spirits attracts many pilgrims from Rajasthan and elsewhere.
- Shri Mahavir Ji Temple is located in Hindaun.
- Nakkash Ki Devi - Gomti Dham Temple is also located in Hindaun.

== Administrative setup ==
Karauli City is the district headquarters of Karauli district, which is divided into eight tehsils, six subdivisions, 223 Panchayats, 881 villages, six Panchayat Samiti, two Nagar Parishad, and one Nagarpalika.

=== Subdivisions ===
- Hindaun Subdivision
- Karauli
- Sapotra
- Mandrayal
- Suroth
- Masalpur
- Shri Mahaveer Ji
- Nadoti

=== Panchayat Samiti ===
- Hindaun Panchayat Samiti
- Karauli
- Todabhim
- Nadoti
- Sapotra
- Mandrayal
- Masalpur
- Shri Mahaveer Ji

=== Nagar Parishad and Nagarpalika ===
- Hindaun City
- Karauli
- Sapotra

== Economy ==
In 2006, the Ministry of Panchayati Raj named Karauli district one of the country's 250 most impoverished districts (out of a total of 640 districts). It is one of the twelve districts in Rajasthan currently receiving funds from the Backward Regions Grant Fund Programme (BRGF).

== Demographics ==
Historical population
Year	Pop.	±% p.a.
1901	298,215	—
1911	295,899	−0.08%
1921	266,079	−1.06%
1931	292,829	+0.96%
1941	330,914	+1.23%
1951	370,984	+1.15%
1961	443,169	+1.79%
1971	557,132	+2.31%
1981	718,715	+2.58%
1991	924,715	+2.55%
2001	1,205,888	+2.69%
2011	1,458,248	+1.92%

In the 2011 census of India, Karauli district had a population of 1,458,248, roughly equal to the nation of Eswatini or the US state of Hawaii. This makes it the 340th most populous district in India. The district has a population density of 264 inhabitants per square kilometre (680/sq mi). Its population growth rate from 2001 to 2011 was 20.57%. Karauli has a sex ratio of 858 females for every 1000 males, and a literacy rate of 67.34%. 14.96% of the population lives in urban areas.

Religions in residual Karauli district (2011)
Religion	Percent
Hinduism	93.62%
Islam	5.96%
Other or not stated	0.42%

After the separation of Todabhim and Nadoti tehsils, the resulting district had a population of 1,056,170. The district had a sex ratio of 858 females per 1000 males. 195,128 people (18.48% of the population) lived in urban areas. Scheduled Castes and Scheduled Tribes made up 267,102 (25.29%) and 209,289 (19.82%) of the population respectively. Hindi is the predominant language, spoken by 99.41% of the population.

== Lok Sabha Constituency ==
Karauli District is a part of Karauli-Dholpur Loksabha Constituency, and Bhajan Lal Jatav is the Current Member of Parliament representing this constituency .

== Notable people ==
- Kirori Singh Bainsla, former Indian Army officer and leader of the Gurjar agitation in Rajasthan
- Sundar Singh Gurjar, Paralympic javelin thrower
