= Hindaun =

Hindaun City City of Hiranyakashipu City of Hidimba City of Bhakt Prahlad
- City
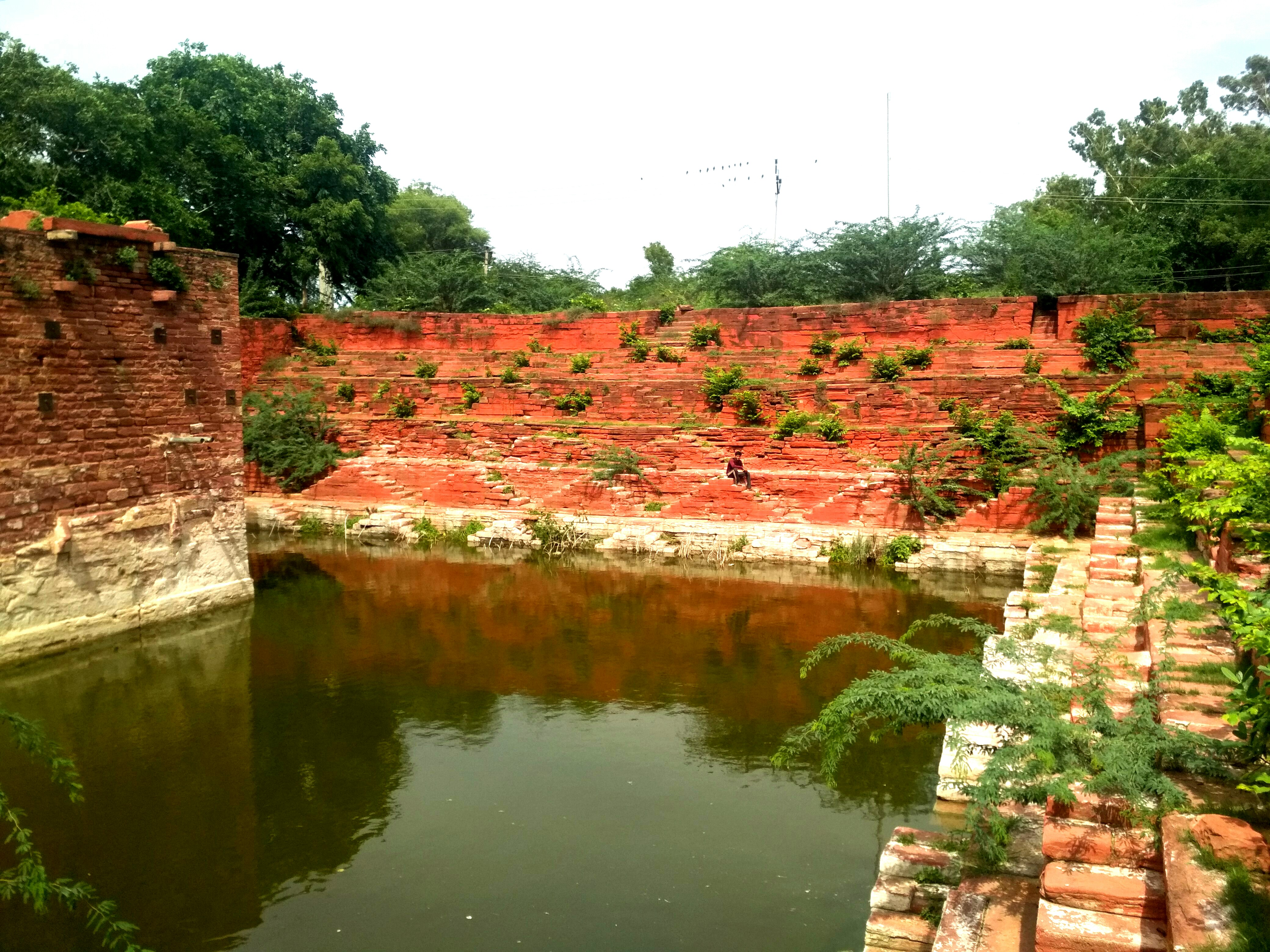
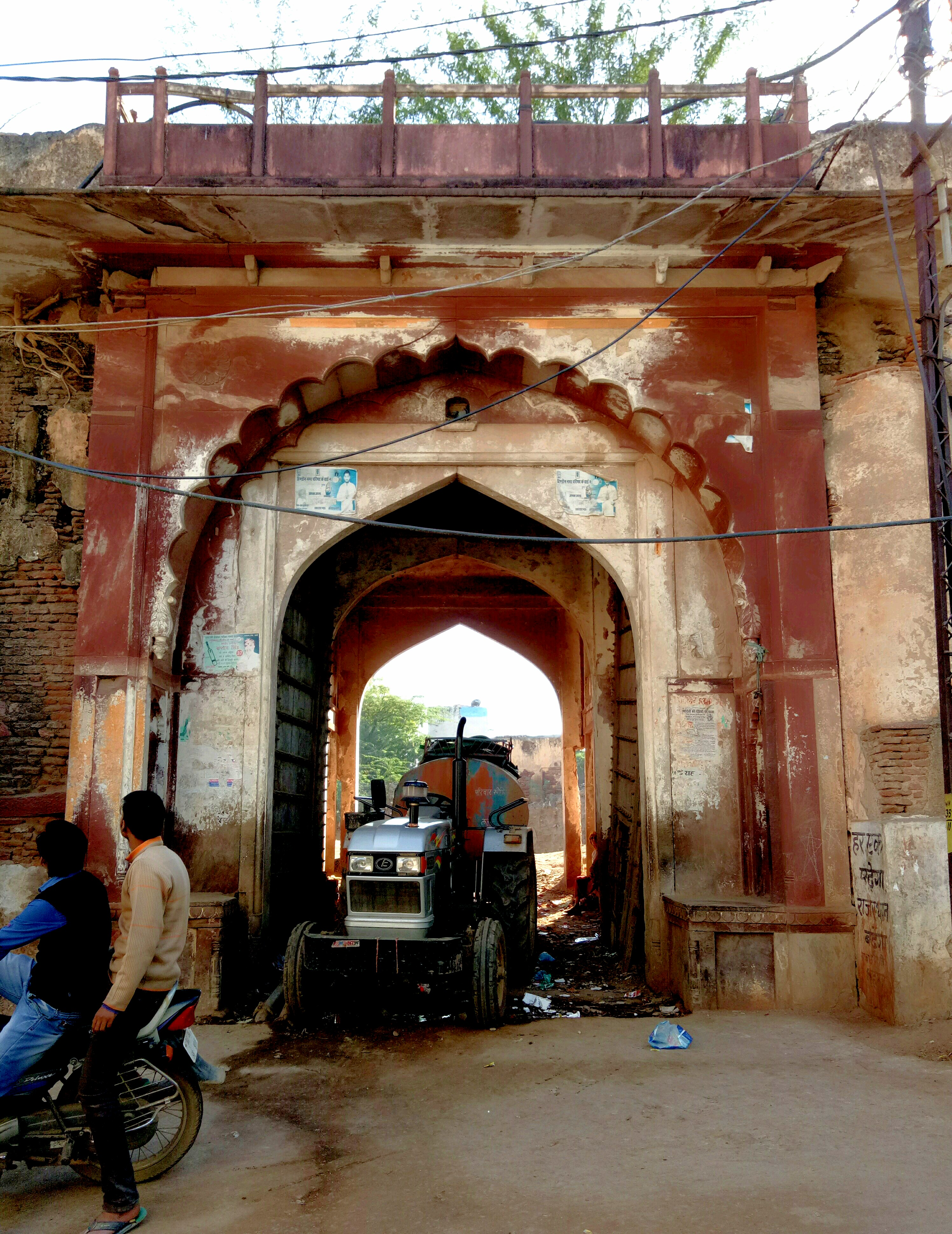
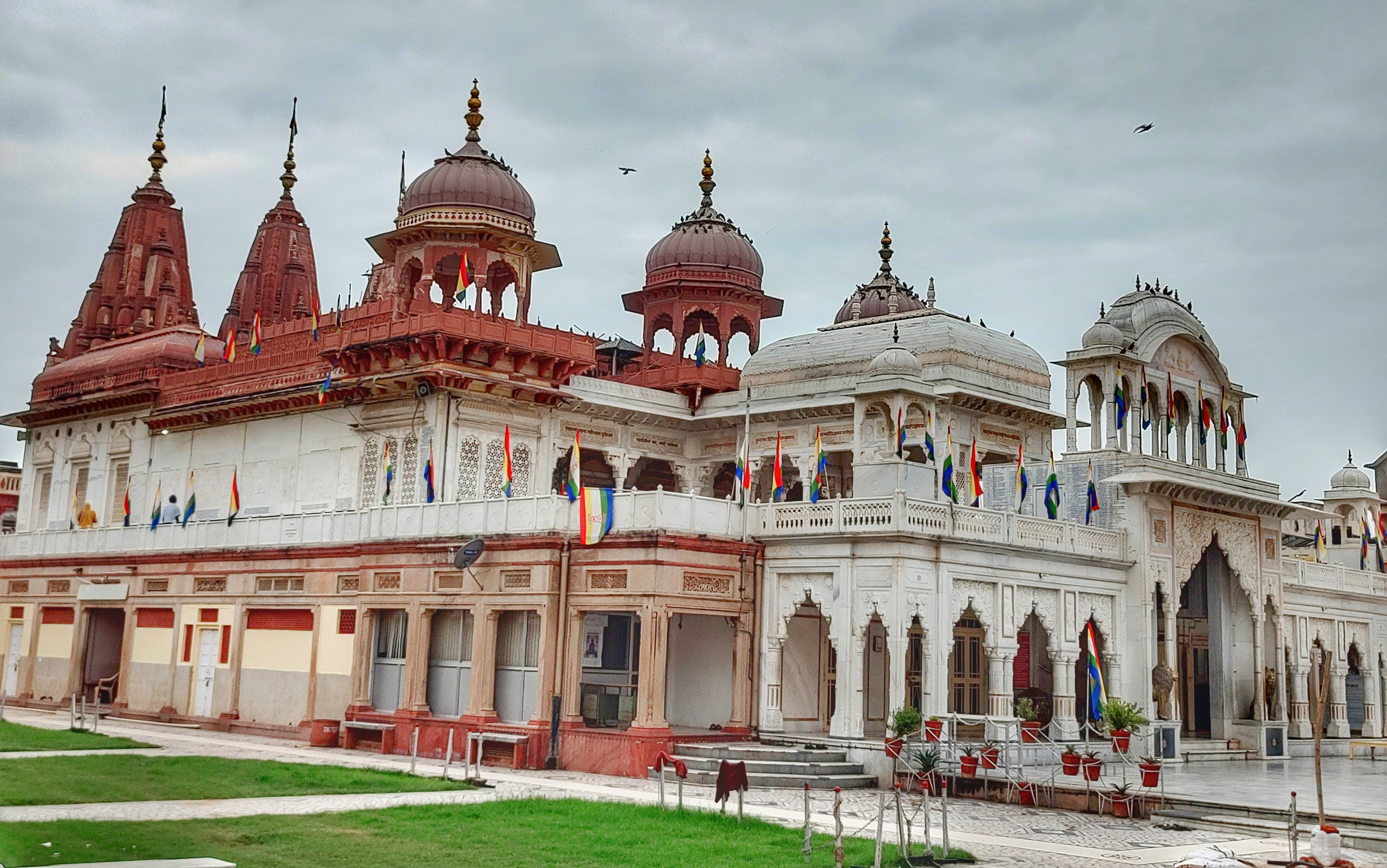
- Top to bottom: Nakkash Ki Devi - Gomti Dham, Jachcha Ki Baori, Jaggar Dam and Hindaun Fort (Purani Kachehri) and Shri Mahaveer Ji temple Jagar Dam & Hills, Hindaun City in Karauli district, Rajasthan, India
- Nickname: Stone City
- Interactive map of Hindaun City
- Coordinates: 26.74°N 77.03°E
- Country: India
- State: Rajasthan
- District: Karauli
- Tehsil: Hindaun Tehsil
- Division: Bharatpur Division
- Named for: Hiranya Kashyap and Hidimba

Government
  - Type: Democratic
  - Body: Municipal Council
  - Assembly constituency: Hindaun (Rajasthan Assembly constituency)
  - MLA: Anita Jatav (INC)
  - Chairman: Brijesh Jatav

Area
  - City: 28.4 km^{2} (11.0 sq mi)
  - Rank: 1st in Karauli District (RJ)
- Elevation: 235 m (771 ft)

Population (2011)
  - City: 105,690
  - Rank: 1st in Karauli District (RJ)
  - Density: 3,720/km^{2} (9,640/sq mi)
  - Metro: 250,000

Languages
  - Official: Hindi
  - Native: Rajasthani, Braj
  - Native Boli: Jagroti
- Time zone: UTC+5:30 (IST)
- PIN: 322230
- Telephone code: 91-7469
- Vehicle registration: RJ 34
- Sex ratio: 1000:889 ♂/♀

Hindaun is a city and municipality, near the city of Karauli in Karauli district, Rajasthan, India. It has a population of 105690 and is governed by a municipal council.

In the vicinity are the Aravalli and Vindhya mountainous ranges.

== History ==
In the ancient time Hindaun came under the Matsya kingdom. There are many ancient structures still present in the town built during the regime of the Matsya Kingdom. Traditionally in some mythological stories the town is believed to be associated with the mythology of Hiranyakashipu and Prahlada mentioned in Bhagavata Purana. The Meenas hold high administrative posts and have a huge impact on the city's economical and financial growth. They also have a rich culture such as their folk songs and dresses (lehenga lugdi). The notable Meena surnames are Jagarwad, Mandaiya and Jorwal.

Hindaun is named after the name of ancient ruler king Hiranyakashipu, father of Prahlada. The temple to Narasimha, an Avatar of Hindu god Vishnu who killed Hiranyakashipu, along with the historic Prahalad Kund (now in dilapidated condition) demonstrates the town's connection to the mythology surrounding Hiranyakashipu and Prahlada.

In April 2018, Hindaun was subjected to a curfew in response to caste-related violence.

== Location ==
Hindaun is located in the eastern part of Rajasthan (a north-western state in India) in the vicinity of the Aravalli Range.

The town is well connected with Jaipur, Agra, Alwar, Dholpur, Bharatpur with modernized roads.

Hindaun has an average elevation of 235 metres (771 ft). Its distance from the state capital of Jaipur is around 150 km.

== Industries ==
The city is known for its sandstone industry. The Red Fort, Akshardham Temple of Delhi, and Ambedkar Park are made of this sandstone. The slate industry is well rooted here and is important in the state. Slate is transported abroad also. Various small-scale industries, e.g. candle, battis, wooden toys, and plastic water pipes, also exist. Hindaun is also famous for its bangles. 'Kheda' situated at 6 km from Hindaun is a hub of industries and famous agricultural machinery.

== Tourist attractions ==
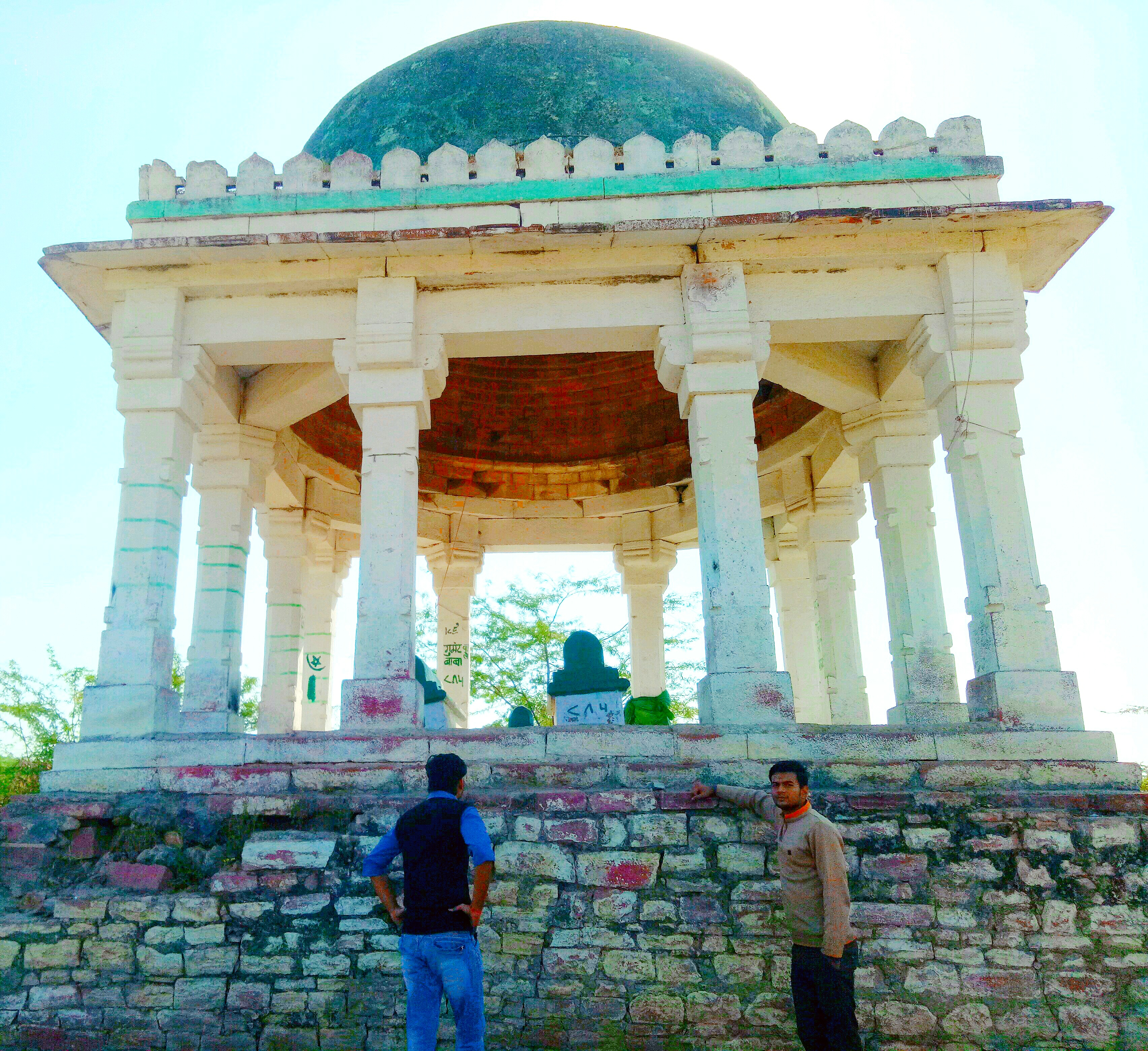
Barah Khamba Gumbat

The main places of attraction in Hindaun City are the Prahladkund, forest, Hiranyakashayap ka kua, palace and the Narsinghji Temple. Shri Mahavirji Temple is a major pilgrimage centre in Jainism. The Jaggar Dam of Jagar, Kundeva, Danghati, the Suroth Fort, City of Moradwaja, the castle of Garmora and Padampura, the Timangarh fort, Sagar Lake, Dhruv Ghata and the well of Nand-Bhaujai are some popular attractions. The temples of goddess Chamunda Mata Temple, Chinayata and Chamunda Mata Temple, Sankarghanta in western part of city, Nakkash Ki Devi - Gomti Dham (the heart temple of Hindaun City) with adjacent sacred pond termed as Jalsen pond. Radha-Raman Ji Temple and Shri Hardev Ji Temple are also famous and located within the city.

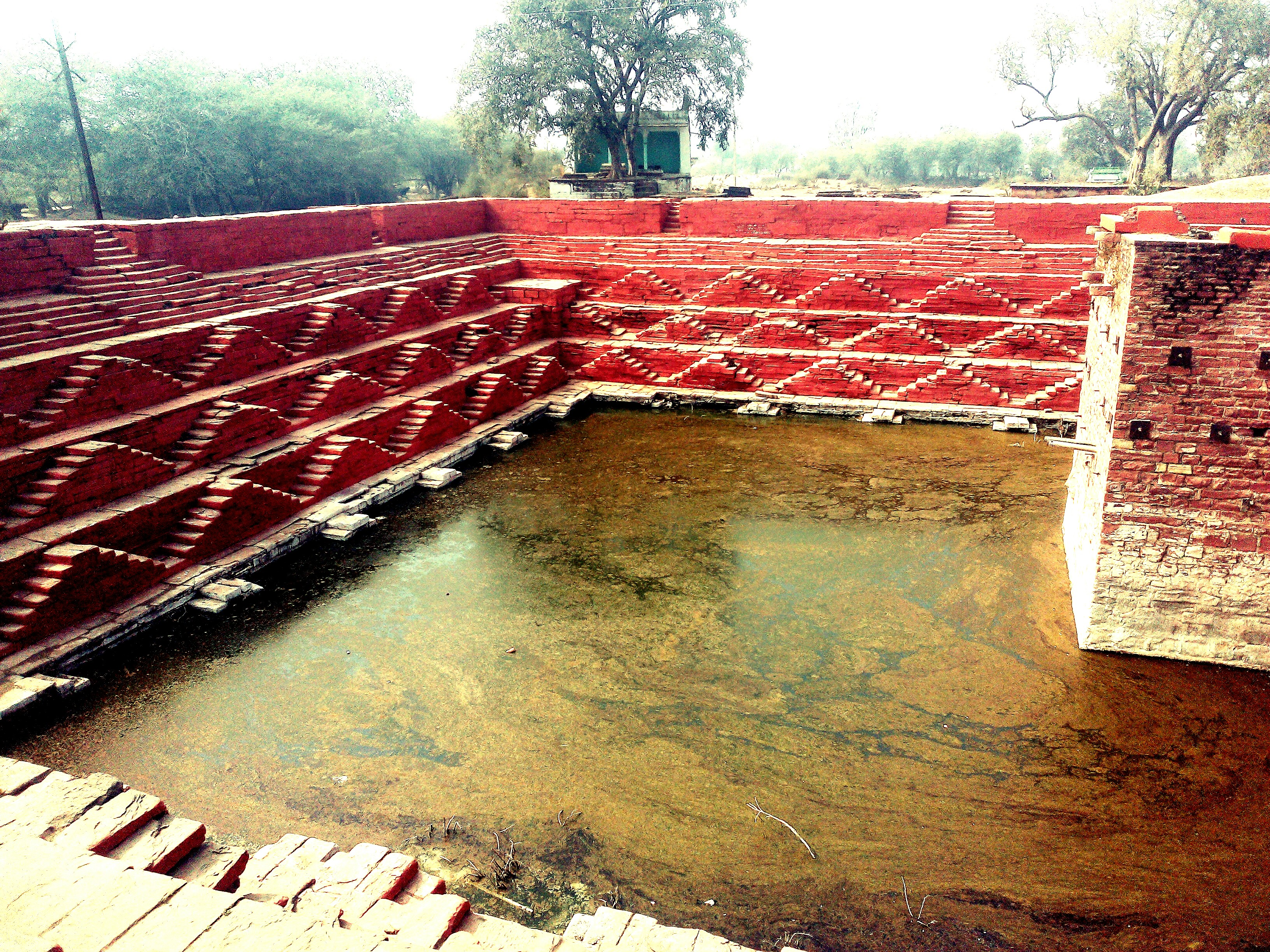
Jachcha Ki Baori

=== List of attractions ===
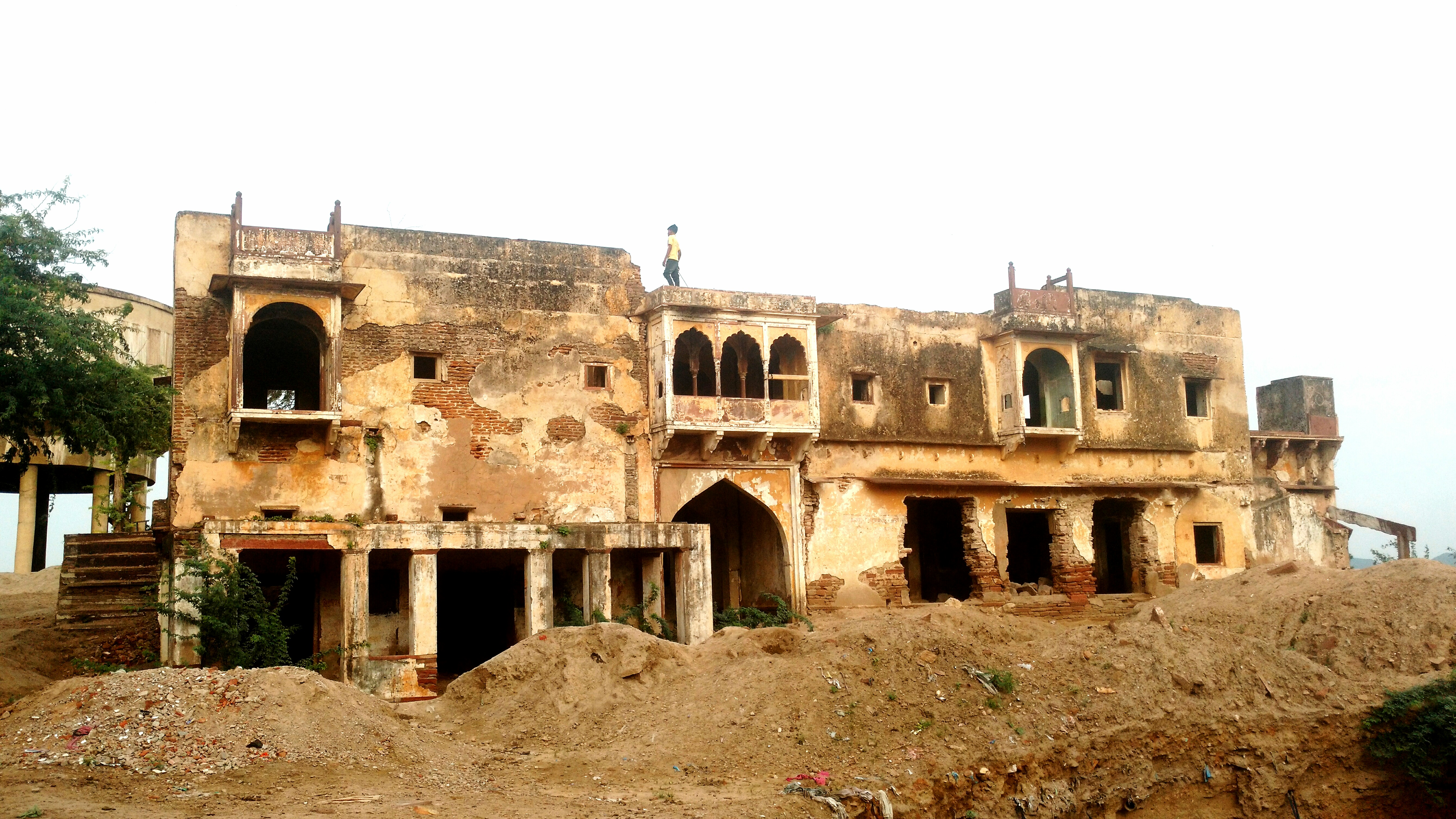
Palace at Hindaun fort

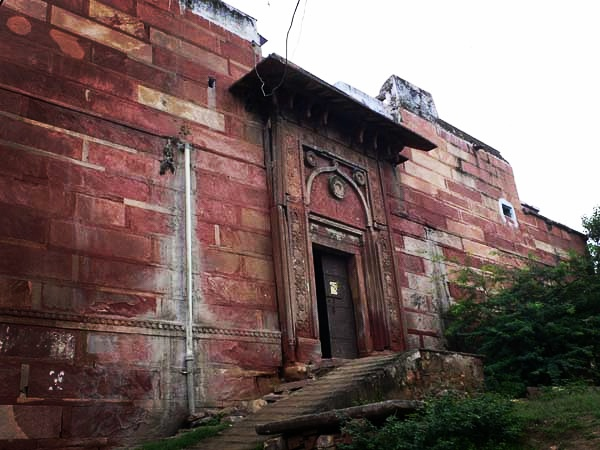
Matia Mahal, Hindaun

Name	Location	Type	Period
Hindaun Fort	Purani Kachehri	Fortress	14th century
Jachcha Ki Baori	Prahalad kund	Baoli/Bawdi (Stepwell)	13th-15th century AD
Matiya Mahal	Near Prahalad kund	Place (Mahal)	13th-15th century AD
Shri Mahavirji	Mahaveer ji	Temple	17th century AD
Shri Raghunath Ji Temple	Old Hindaun	temple	16th century AD
Nakkash Ki Devi - Gomti Dham	Gomti Dham	Temple	20th century
Narsinghji Temple	Prahalad kund	temple	
Jaggar Dam	Jagar	Natural dam & hills	1957
Timangarh	Timan Garh	Fortress	12th century

Dargah of Sufi Saint Shaikh Abdur-Rehmaan Chishti is also at Hadoli. The shrine has the grave (Maqbara) of the revered saint, Shaikh Abdur - Rehmaan Chisti, nephew of the greatest sufi saint of India Moinuddin Chishti in Ajmer, Rajasthan.

Historical population
Year	Pop.	±%
1901	11,938	—
1911	10,640	−10.9%
1921	8,687	−18.4%
1931	10,825	+24.6%
1941	13,804	+27.5%
1951	14,673	+6.3%
1961	20,237	+37.9%
1971	27,895	+37.8%
1981	42,706	+53.1%
1991	60,780	+42.3%
2001	84,591	+39.2%
2011	105,690	+24.9%
Source: Census of India

Religions in Hindaun
Hinduism	80.56%
Islam	17.33%
Christianity	0.11%
Jainism	1.75%
sikh	0.18%
Buddhism	0.02%
Others	0.4%
Distribution of religions

As per provisional reports of Census India, the population of Hindaun in 2011 was 105,690; of which male and female are 49,541 and 56,149 respectively. The sex ratio of Hindaun is 881 per 1000 males.

As per the census, the total number of literates in the city was 105,690, of whom 56,149 were males and 49,541 were females. The average literacy rate of Hindaun was 76.58 percent, of which male and female literacy was 87.79 and 63.94 percent, respectively.

Total children (aged 0–6) in Hindaun were 45,451 as per figure from Census India report in 2011. There were 25,345 boys and 20,106 girls. The child sex ratio of girls was 852 girls per 1000 boys.

== Climate ==
Temperature in summer ranges between 25 and 45 degrees Celsius and in winter it is between 2 and 23 degrees Celsius. The climate is so pleasant that many communities and tribes like the Jangids, Mandaiyas and the Gurjars migrated to this region.

== Agriculture ==
The land of the area is fertile and the crop rotation is commenced by the ryots. The central agriculture yard is located at Kyarda village opposite to 220kv power house. The major crops are wheat, millet, maize, mustard, cluster bean, ground nut, gooseberry, lemon, potato, gram, barley. The monsoon, Jagar dam and canal, wells and underground water are the source of irrigation. The seasonal vegetables and fruits are also grown by peasants.

== Education ==
The city is famous for its industrial training institutes. There are teacher training institutes. Almost all district toppers in RBSE exams are from Hindaun City. Saint Francis De sales school in Kanchroli, the best school in the city, has proved academic excellence in the previous years by securing ranks in RBSE examinations. It is also known for its sporting culture and extracurricular activities. Lakshya Chaturvedi bagged 99.50 % in secondary examination 2022-23, securing 1st state merit in Rajasthan.

== Transportation ==
=== Roads ===
NH 47 (Indian National Highway No. 47) links Delhi to Mohana, MP by Delhi-Haryana-Rajasthan-Madhya Pradesh was announced by the central government in March 2016. Bharatpur Beawar expressway has also been announced by the state government. It is expected to operate by 2030.

==== City transportation ====
Shared autos are operated between the roadways bus stand and the railway station. People use buses and auto-rickshaws to reach nearby places.

=== Railway ===
Hindaun City is a station on the New Delhi–Mumbai main line. Other railway stations in proximity to the city are Shri Mahabirji, Fateh Singhpura and Sikroda Meena.

=== Airport ===
The nearest major airport is Jaipur International Airport, which is 160 km from the city-centre, and offers sporadic service to major domestic and international locations. Jaipur international airport connects Hindaun globally to cities like New York, Paris, Melbourne, London etc.

== See also ==
- Lakshya Beniwal
- Lakshya Chaturvedi
- Hemraj Gurjar
