= Charkhari Assembly constituency =

Constituency of the Uttar Pradesh legislative assembly in India

Coordinates: 25.40°N 79.75°E

Charkhari
- Constituency No. 231 for the Uttar Pradesh Legislative Assembly

Constituency details
- Country: India
- Region: North India
- State: Uttar Pradesh
- District: Mahoba
- Lok Sabha constituency: Hamirpur
- Total electors: 3,46,471
- Reservation: None

Member of Legislative Assembly
- 18th Uttar Pradesh Legislative Assembly
- Incumbent Brijbhushan Rajpoot
- Party: Bharatiya Janta Party
- Elected year: 2022

Charkhari is a constituency of the Uttar Pradesh Legislative Assembly covering the entire sub-district of Kulpahar and part of the sub-district Charkhari in the Mahoba district of Uttar Pradesh, India. It is mainly a rural constituency having small urban centers of Kulpahar, Charkhari, Panwari, Jaitpur and Kharela.

Charkhari is one of five assembly constituencies in the Hamirpur (Uttar Pradesh Lok Sabha constituency). Since 2008, this assembly constituency has been numbered 231 amongst 403 constituencies.

== Members of the Legislative Assembly ==
- 1962: Mohan Lal Ahirwar, Indian National Congress
- 1967: J. Singh, Independent
- 1969: Chandra Narain Singh, Bharatiya Jana Sangh
- 1974: Kashi Prasad, Bharatiya Kranti Dal
- 1977: Mohan Lal, Indian National Congress
- 1980: Mohan Lal, Indian National Congress (Indira)
- 1985: Mihi Lal, Indian National Congress
- 1989: Kashi Prasad, Janata Dal
- 1991: Mihi Lal, Indian National Congress
- 1993: Udai Prakash, Bahujan Samaj Party
- 1996: Chhotey Lal, Bharatiya Janata Party
- 2002: Ambesh Kumari, Samajwadi Party
- 2007: Anil Kumar Ahirwar, Bahujan Samaj Party
- 2012: Uma Bharti, Bharatiya Janata Party
- 2014: Kaptan Singh, Samajwadi Party
- 2015: Urmila Rajput, Samajwadi Party
- 2017: Brijbhushan Rajpoot, Bharatiya Janata Party
- 2022: Brijbhushan Rajpoot, Bharatiya Janata Party

== Election results ==
=== 2027 ===
2027 Uttar Pradesh Legislative Assembly election: Charkhari
Party	Candidate	Votes	%	±%
INDIA				
NDA				
BSP				
NOTA	None of the above			
Majority				
Turnout				
gain from		Swing		

=== 2022 ===
Bharatiya Janta Party candidate Brijbhusan Rajpoot alias Guddu Bhaiya won in 2022 Uttar Pradesh Legislative Elections defeating Samajwadi Party candidate Ramjeevan by a margin of 41,881 votes.

2022 Uttar Pradesh Legislative Assembly election: Charkhari
Party	Candidate	Votes	%	±%
BJP	Brijbhushan Rajput	102,051	45.75	−0.28
SP	Ramjeevan Yadav	60,170	26.97	+1.54
BSP	Vinod Kumar	41,087	18.42	−3.76
INC	Nirdosh Kumar Dixit	7,187	3.22	
Jan Adhikar Party	Santosh Singh	5,074	2.27	
NOTA	None of the above	2,256	1.01	−0.31
Majority		41,881	18.78	−1.82
Turnout		223,078	64.39	−1.89
BJP hold		Swing		

=== 2017 ===
2017 Uttar Pradesh Legislative Assembly Election: Charkhari
Party	Candidate	Votes	%	±%
BJP	Brijbhushan Rajpoot Alias Guddu Bhaiya	98,360	46.03	
SP	Urmila Devi	54,346	25.43	
BSP	Jitendra Kumar Mishra	47,408	22.18	
Jan Adhikar Manch	Hemlata Kushwaha	2,178	1.02	
Bharatiya Shakti Chetna Party	Susheel Kumar	2,023	0.95	
NOTA	None of the above	2,775	1.32	
Majority		44,014	20.6	
Turnout		213,705	66.28	
