= AKW =

AKW may refer to:

- Aghajari Airport (IATA code akw), an airport serving Omidiyeh, Iran
- Akona, Uttar Pradesh (Indian Railways station code "AKW")
- Akwa language (ISO 639-3 code akw), a Bantu language of the Republic of Congo
- Angkor Airways (ICAO code AKW), a defunct Cambodian airline
- Artesia: Adventures in the Known World, role-playing game
- Klawock Airport (FAA LID code AKW), airport in Klawock, Alaska
- General Family Allowances Act, Algemene Kinderbijslagwet, part of the Dutch Social security system
