= Raja Ka Tal =

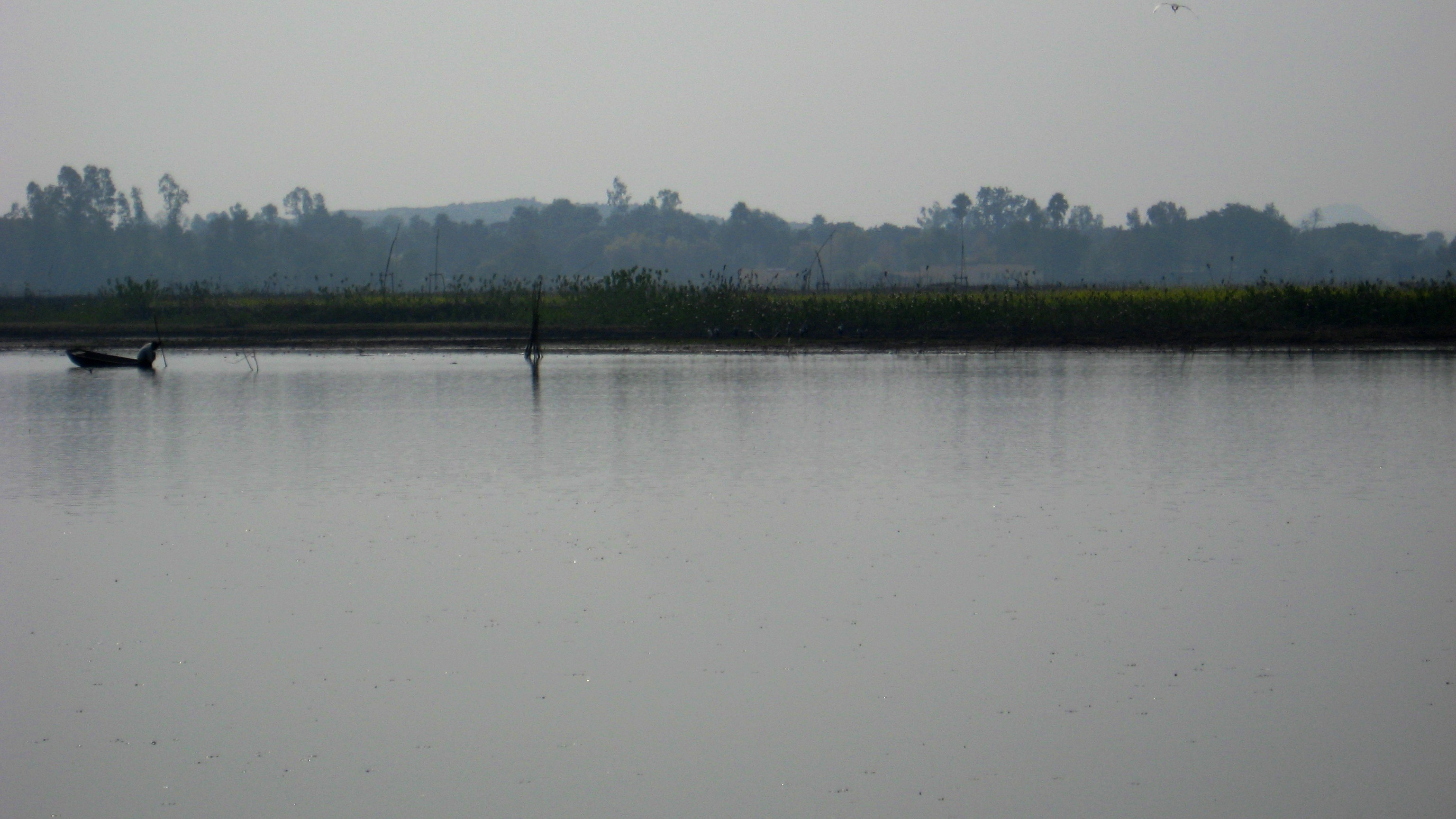

- Location within Uttar Pradesh
- Coordinates: 25.17°N 79.52°E
- Type: reservoir
- Basin countries: India
- Settlements: 1

Raja Ka Tal or Raja Ka Taal, known locally as Bara Tal, is a reservoir near the city of Kulpahar in the Mahoba district of the Indian state of Uttar Pradesh. It was built by Senapati, the grandson of Maharaja Chhatrasal, in 1707.

There is also a town called Raja Ka Tal, which is on National Highway 19 near the city of Firozabad in Uttar Pradesh. The population of the town is over 10,000. It connects to the Indian railway's Howrah–Delhi main line. The town has a large glass production industry, which exports internationally.
