= Shringirishi Temples in Bundelkhand =

Hindu Temple in Uttar Pradesh, India

Shringirishi Maharaj (Rishyasringa) assumes higher position in Hindu religion. His first instance is known when King Dasharatha invited him to perform Putreshthi Yajna-for the procreation as the name suggests-and later by this gracious deed, we have four figures who are highly revered in Hindu Religion, namely Lord Rama, Laxman, Bharat, and Shatrughna. Singirishi Samaj in Bundelkhand lives on the banks of river Betwa and Narmada in the parts of Uttar Pradesh and Madhya Pradesh. The descendants of Shrinigirsihi Maharaj arrived in this region in 800 AD from Rajasthan. Engrossed with the Agrarian potential of the region, they started to live here and ultimately established themselves. The family names start from Nayak, Sharma, Shringirishi, Tiwari, Joshi, Pandit, Pathak, Pandey, and the like. Other descendants who still live in Rajasthan are known as Sikhwal or Sukhwal. In total, there are 64 temples or ashram devoted to Shringirishi Maharaj all over India. Specifically in the region of Bundelkhand, the descendants have kept the image of Shringirishi Maharaj alive by constructing four temples in: Kharela, Baruasagar Hamirpur and Sangauli.

== Shringirishi Temples ==
=== Temple in Kharela ===
In Vikram Samvat 972, it is believed that a Shringirshi temple was constructed in village Kharela which lies in Mahoba District in Uttar Pradesh. According to Mahabharat, Kharela is assumed to be the capital of the kingdom of King Virat. Pandavas, while serving exile, took shelter here in this kingdom. The Shringirishi Temple lies in the middle of the village. The locals call it Mahamuni ki Gaddi. In the month of Shravana (July–August), Kajali fair is celebrated annually.

=== Temple in Baruasagar ===
Second biggest Shringirishi temple in the Bundelkhand region is in the small town of Baruasagar, which is about 30 km from Jhansi in Uttar Pradesh. Under Swami Sharnanand Ji Maharaj, this temple came into existence on 15 June 1979. Though the temple is not old, its popularity transcend beyond the descendants of Shringirishi Maharaj. The site is famous for a cascade, thus the place is called as Jharna. Each year on the occasion of Guru Purnima, the Shringirishi Community gather for celebrating the life and works of Shringirishi Maharaj.

=== Temple in Khurai ===
Third temple in Khurai, which lies in District Sagar in the state of Madhya Pradesh finished construction on 15 May 2005.

=== Temple in Sagauli ===
Recent edition of Shringirishi Maharaj Temple is in the village of Sangouli, which is about 80 km from Jhansi in the state of Uttar Pradesh. The temple is situated on a small hill alongside the temple of Lord Hanumana. The speciality of this temple is that it has not only the idol of Shringirishi Maharaj but also one of his wife Shanta.

== Culture & History ==
These temples extend their existence from one corner of Bundelkhand region to other. Annual occasions hosted in these temples serve the purpose of uniting the descendants of Bundelkhand with the Sikhwal Samaj. On a historic note, these temples are the evidence of the spread of civilization from its origin to its survival.

== Photo gallery ==
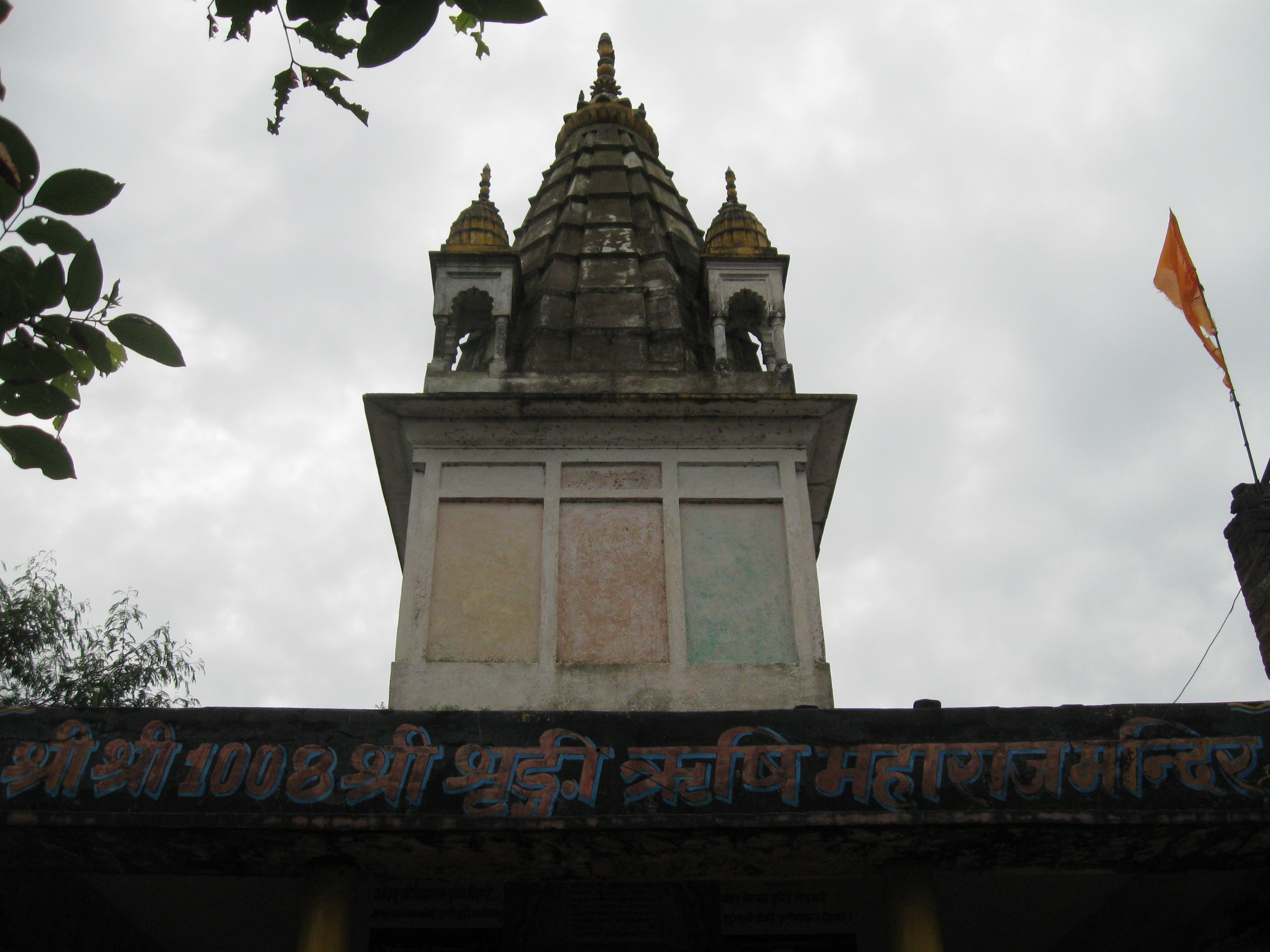
Shringirishi Temple in Baruasagar

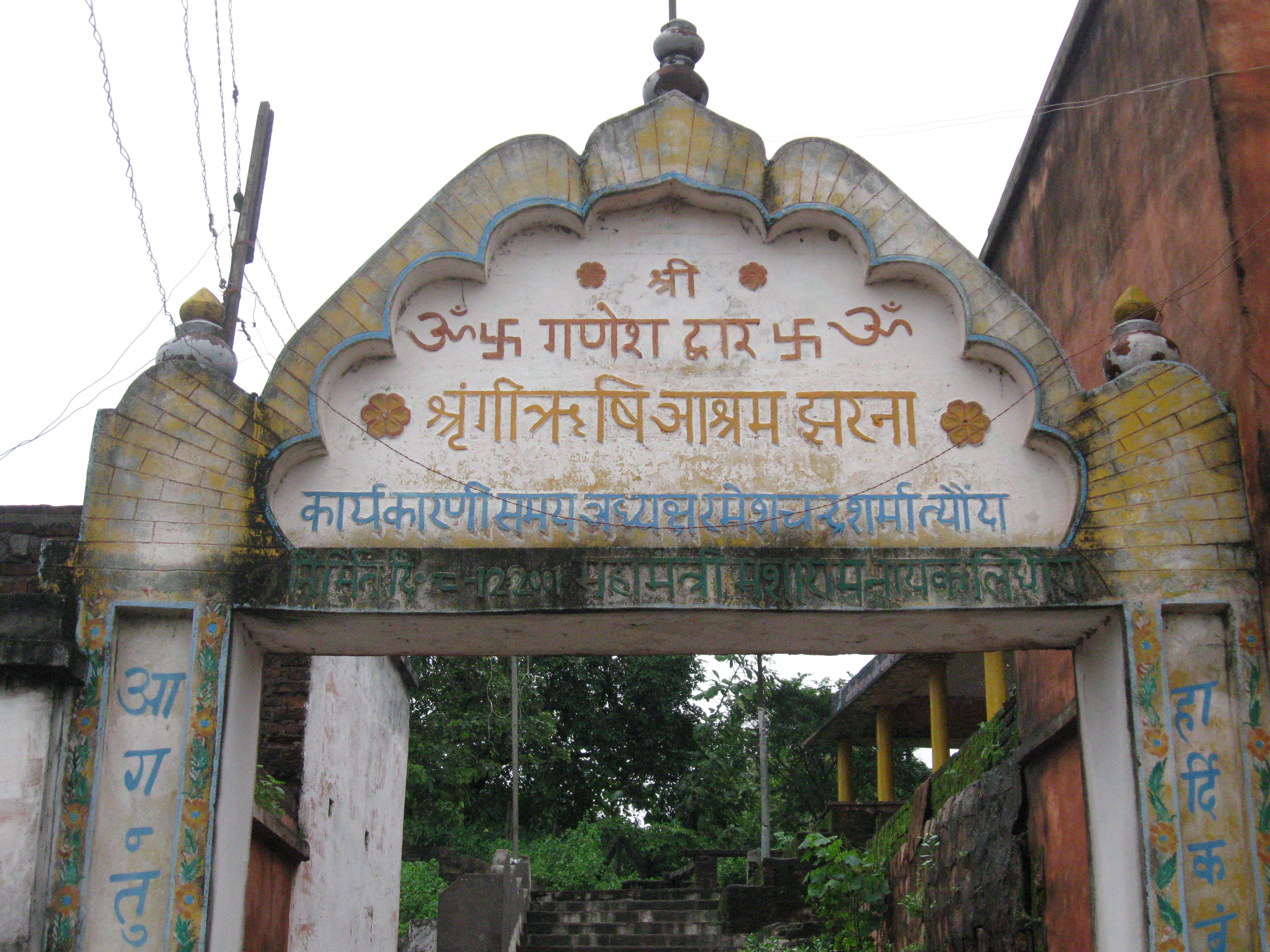
Entrance to the Shringirishi Temple in Baruasagar

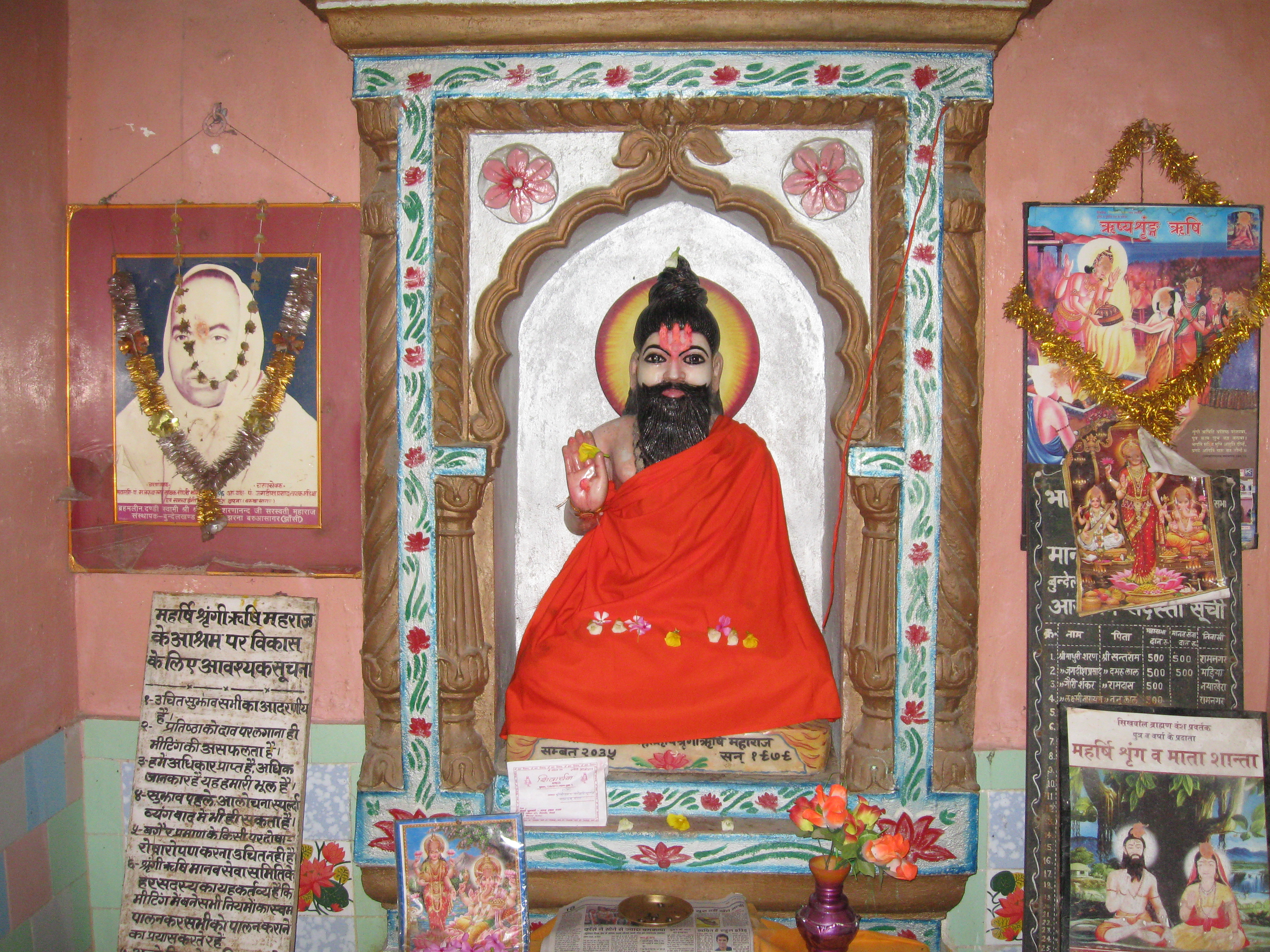
Idol of Shringirishi Maharaj and other deities

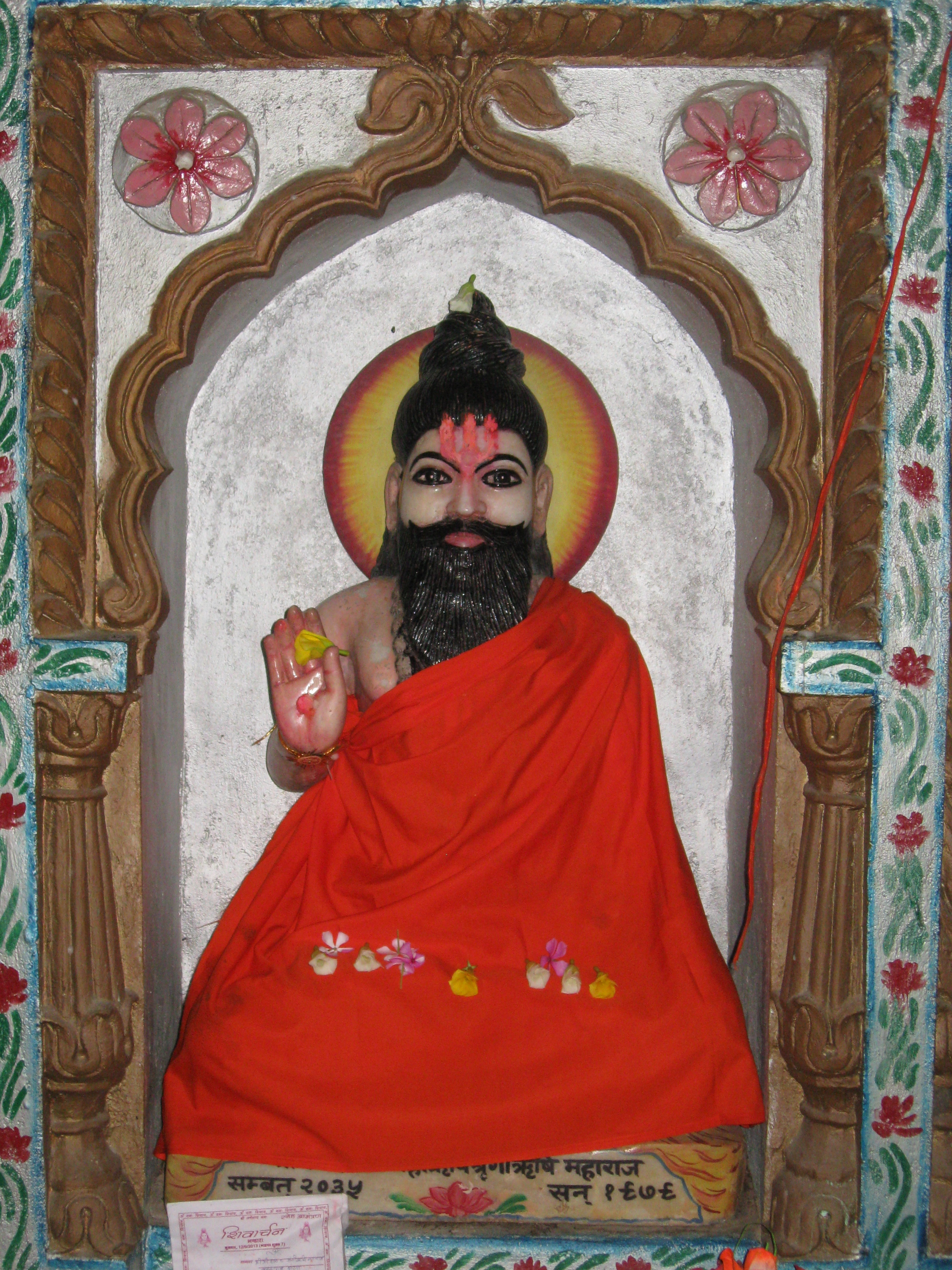
Idol of Shringirishi Maharaj

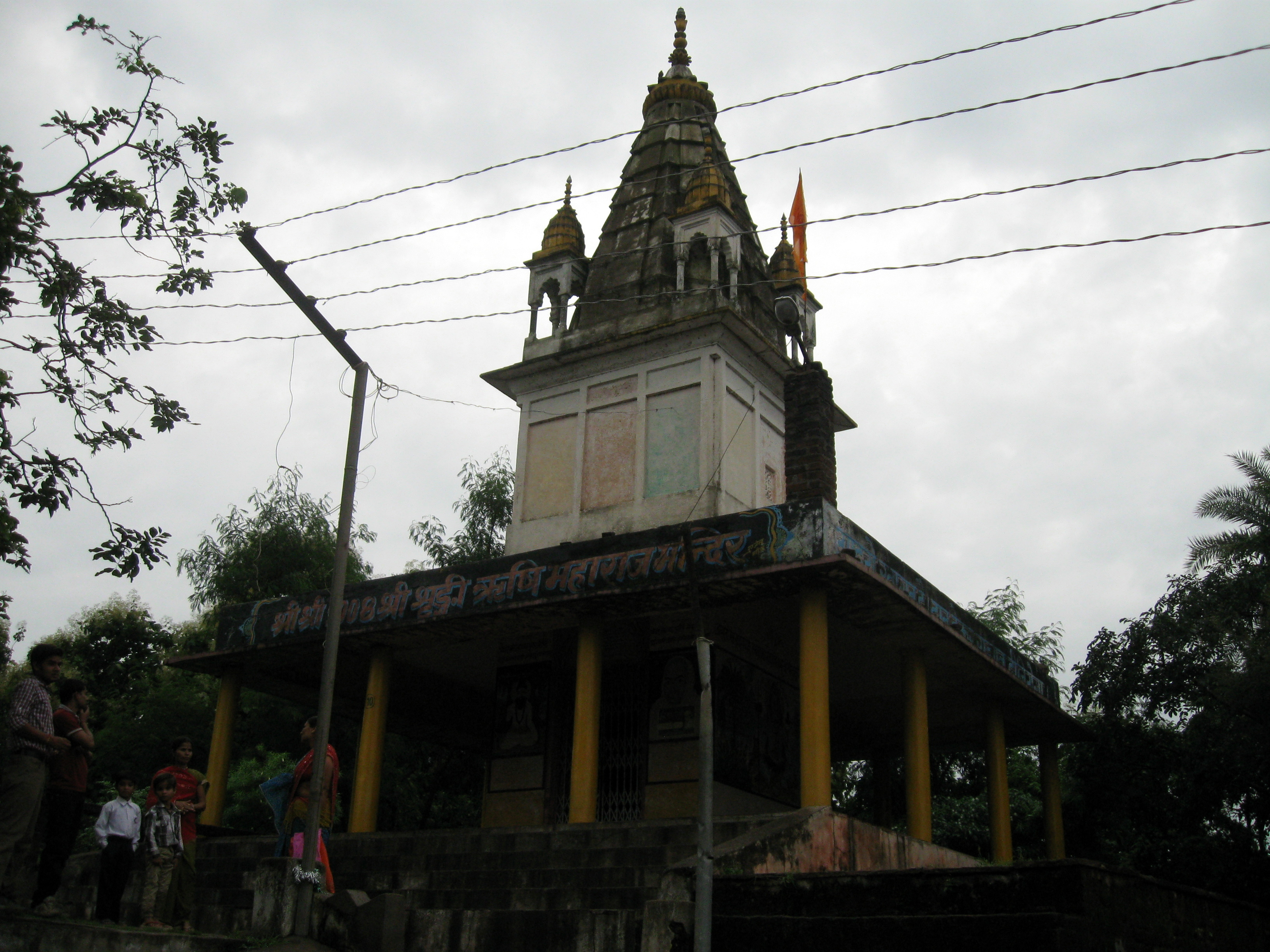
A view of the Shringirishi Temple in Baruasagar from outside

== See also ==
- Rishyashringa
