= Kulpahar =

- City
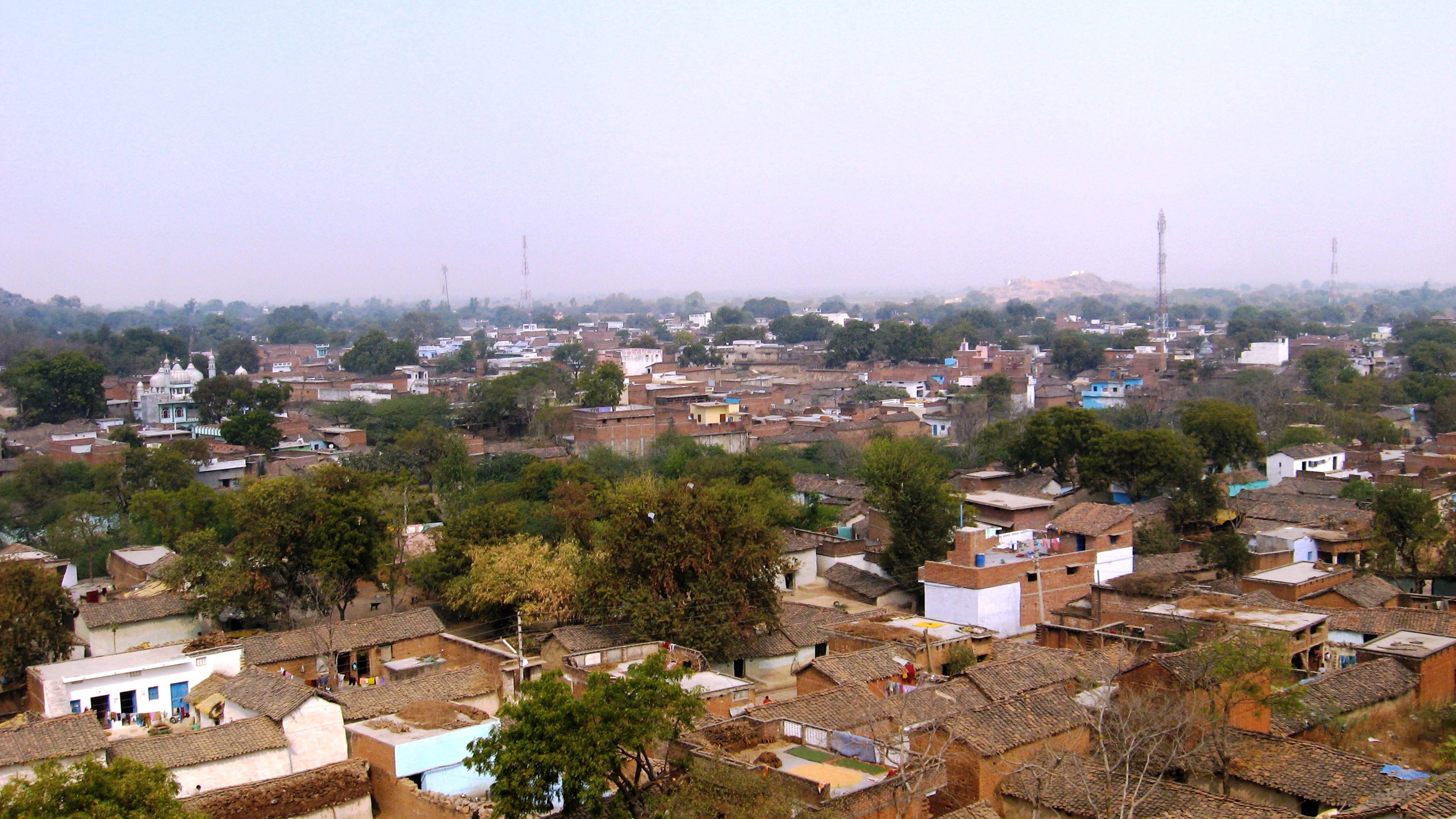
- View of the city from Senapati palace

- Location in Uttar Pradesh, India Kulpahar (India)
- Coordinates: 25.319°N 79.641°E
- Country: India
- State: Uttar Pradesh
- Region: Bundelkhand
- District: Mahoba
- Founder: Chandela Rajput
- Named for: Clan mountain

Government
  - Type: City council
  - Body: Kulpahar Municipality
  - Chairperson: Mr. Vaibhav Arjariya

Area
  - Total: 2.75 km^{2} (1.06 sq mi)
- Elevation: 198 m (650 ft)

Population (2011)
  - Total: 20,096
  - Density: 7,334/km^{2} (18,990/sq mi)

Languages
  - Official: Hindi
- Time zone: UTC+5:30 (IST)
- PIN: 210 426
- Telephone code: 91-5283
- Vehicle registration: UP-95

Kulpahar is a city in Mahoba district in the Indian state of Uttar Pradesh. It is a historical town in the Bundelkhand region. Before 11 Feb 1995 Kulpahar was a Tehsil of Hamirpur District. On 11 Feb 1995 Mahoba District was carved out of Hamirpur, and Kulpahar is now a part of the Mahoba District. Kulpahar is the largest Subdivision of Uttar Pradesh. Kulpahar is known for its closeness to Khajuraho and other historic places like Mahoba, Charkhari, Kalinjar Rath, Orchha, and Jhansi. This town holds relics of temples and man-made water bodies of the Chandela Dynasty

== Origin of the name ==
Historians have different theories about the origin of its name, primarily there are two opinions about the name.

i. Two village theory - According to the Imperial gazetteer of United Province of Agra and Oudh -1909 there were two different villages Kulhua and paharia which later jointly became the town of Kulpahar; even the folklore says the same. It doesn't have any supporting evidence for the theory; it seems that the British writer of the gazetteer went by the folklore.

ii. Second theory is based on some historical facts dating back early 17th century. There was a cult gossain in the central India and one of the descendant of the followers of this cult Himmat Bahadur Gossain who actively took part in Indian freedom struggle was born in Kulpahar and Kulpahar had connection with this cult since the origin of the cult. Gossain cult is believed to be originated/started from Kulpahar. Historians who relate Kulpahar with the gossain cult gave the theory that Kulpahar word is composed of two words Kula and pahar means Clan mountain. Some relate it with a tantrik rite Kaula Tantra. Kulpahar was a site to perform secret tantrik rituals of gossain cult on a hill near Gahra lake; hence the town got its name Kaula pahar which as the time passed became Kulpahar.

== History ==
Kulpahar was the capital of a princely state of the same name in British India. Kulpahar was founded in 1700 by Raja Jagat Raj of Jaitpur, son of Maharaja Chhatrasal, and was reorganized by Senapati, a Bundela Rajput who was Raja Jagat Raj's son. Kulpahar was captured by the British in 1804, and became a princely state in the Bundelkhand Agency of the Central India Agency. The chief resided at the town of Nowgong in Madhya Pradesh. The fort of Kulpahar, situated on a steep hill, towers more than 800 ft (244 m) above the sea level, and contains the ruins of elaborately carved sculptures.

Brief history of Kulpahar is covered under the section of origin. Not much information is available about the medieval and ancient history of Kulpahar but the remains of structures dating back 9th and 10th century confirm the existence and importance of Kulpahar in the ancient and medieval India.

After the Mughals' fall and the rise of Chhatrasal Bundela, Kulpahar passed under his sway but failed to acquire any kind of pre-eminence. In the 17th century, Chhatrasal declared independence and put a stiff resistance against Aurangzeb. He established a Bundella Principality and Bahadur Shah Moghal had to confirm all his acquisitions in the area called 'Bundelkhand'. There was a revival of hostilities during the reign of Farrukhsiyar when his general Mohammed Khan Bangash invaded Bundelkhand in the year 1729 and the aged ruler Chatrasal had to seek aid from Peshwa Baji Rao. His 'Maratha army' of 70,000 men dashed from Indore (Malwa) and encamped at Mahoba. They surrounded forces of Nawab Bangash who had captured Jaitpur, Belatal, Mudhari and Kulpahar etc. The Peshwa inflicted a crushing defeat over the Nawab by annihilating his forces in the dense forests of Jaitpur, Mudhari and Salat near Kulpahar. In return for this help, Chhatrasal bequeathed one third of his dominion to the Maratha chieftain. That part included Mahoba, Shri Nagar, Jaitpur, Kulpahar etc. Later, under the treaty Bessien in 1803 the marathas ceded Bundelkhand area to British rulers. Its administration was, however, carried over by the subedar of Jalaun until 1858 when it was finally annexed by the East India Company. Kulpahar was made the headquarters of a Tehsil under the sub-division of Mahoba in the district of Hamirpur.

== Archaeological sites ==
There are quite a few archaeological sites in and near Kulpahar from the 10th century.

Some of the sites are:

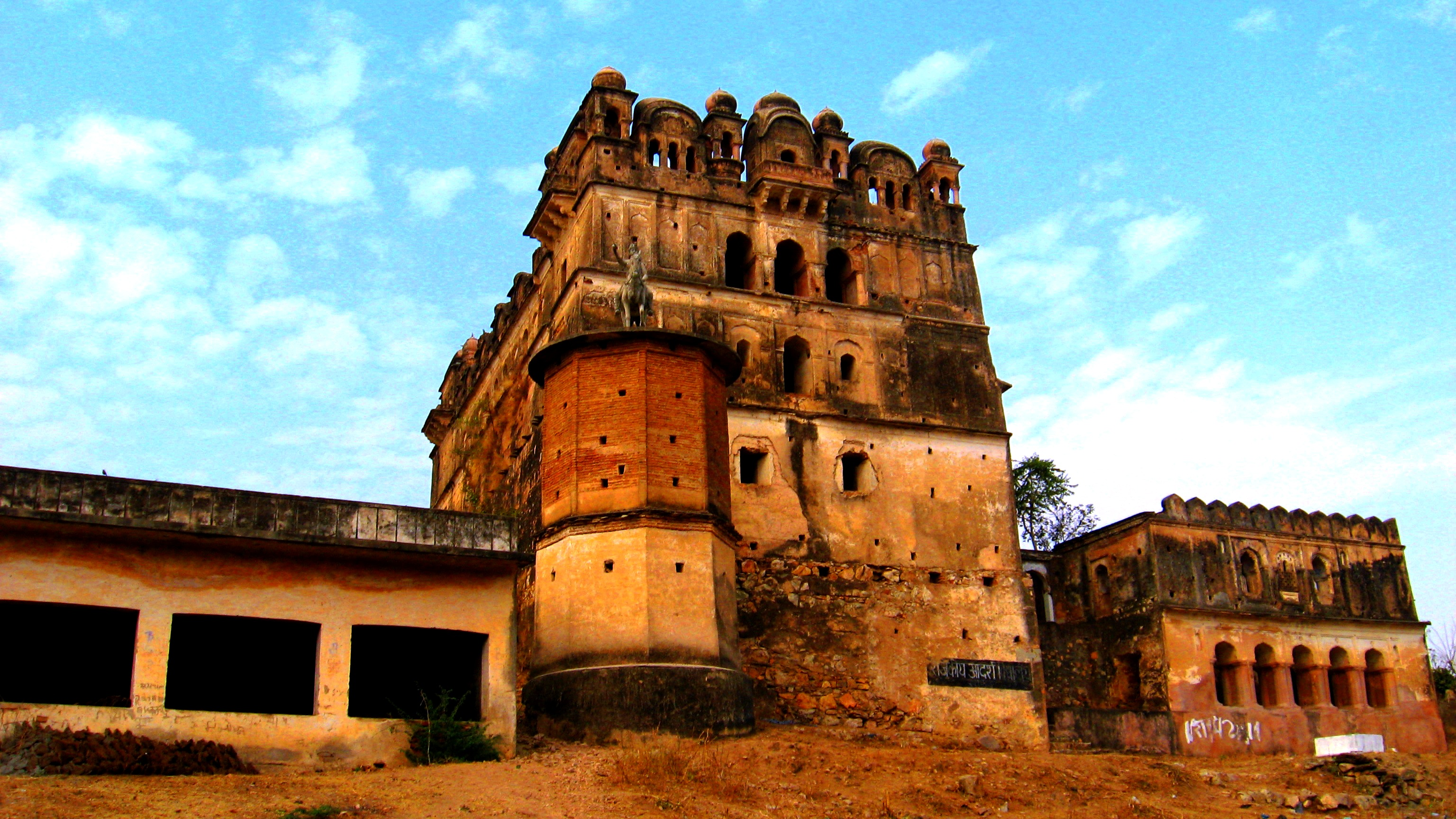
Senapati Palace

Chandela temple

- Senapati Mahal – This small palace was built by Raja Jagatraj of Jaitpur in the early 18th century for his son Senapati. It is a triple storied building situated on Kulpahar-Nowgong road near KM 1 milestone just opposite to collectorate on a small hill. Archaeological Survey of India has started renovation work, it has been declared a monument of national importance.
- Chandela period Yajna Mandap near village Akona – It is a large Hindu yajna mandap situated on Jaitpur-Srinagar road. This mandap dates back 10th century AD. It is 20x20x20 cubic feet area. On the southern side of this mandap is a granite Shivalingam. This area was built by chandela rulers to carryout most auspicious Hindu rituals.
- Senapati fortress – This is a small fortification around Senapati palace built by Senapati in mid 18th century when he was managing the security of Kulpahar area during his father Raja Jagatraj's reign.
- Raja Ka Tal lake – It is a large lake built by Jagatraj in the early 18th century AD. Total area of this covers over 2 square km. It was the main source of irrigation and drinking water supply during his reign.
- Belasagar lake – It is situated alongside the Kulpahar-Nowgong road 10 km from Kulpahar bus station. It is one of the largest lakes of the area. It was built by Raja Parikshit of Jaitpur in the loving memory of his wife Bela during last decade of 19th century. It covers an area of over 8 square km. This lake is bounded by Kulpahar-Nowgong road on one side and Jaitur-Srinagar road on other side. It is the major source for irrigation and drinking water for Kulpahar area. On the embankment of this lake ruins of forts of Raja Jagatraj and Raja Parikshit exists on a hillock.
- Chandela period temples near village Rawatpura, Salat and Akona – These temples resembles the architecture of Khajuraho temples. These were built during 9th–10th century by Chandela rulers who built the Kamasutra temples of Khajuraho.
- Four Chandela temples and small masonry tank – These temples and tank dates back 9th century AD.
- Ruins of granite temple in charnwa – This temple was built even before the chandela period.
- Small mound locally known as Bhainsa sur with a ruined temple on the summit and old statue inside it
- Ruins of a palace on a hill – This massive palace is situated on NH-76. Archaeological Survey of India is carrying out renovation work in the area. This palace has been declared a monument of national importance. It dates back 16th century AD.
- Old well with an inscription of Samvat 755
- Large tank in Pathari Kadin
- Large Chandela tank on the embankment on which stands a large ruined temple of the earliest Chandela type
- Small temple of which the dome has fallen

== Geography ==
Kulpahar is on National Highway No. 339A, 135 km from Jhansi and 278 km from Allahabad at an altitude of 795 feet (242 m) at Latitude 25° 19' N, Longitude 79° 39' E.

== Administration ==
=== Local self government ===
Kulpahar is governed by a municipality under the Uttar Pradesh Municipal Act. It has 17 member council and the council is chaired by a chairperson who is directly elected by 15,145 electorates. The council is called Nagar panchayat

=== Police administration ===
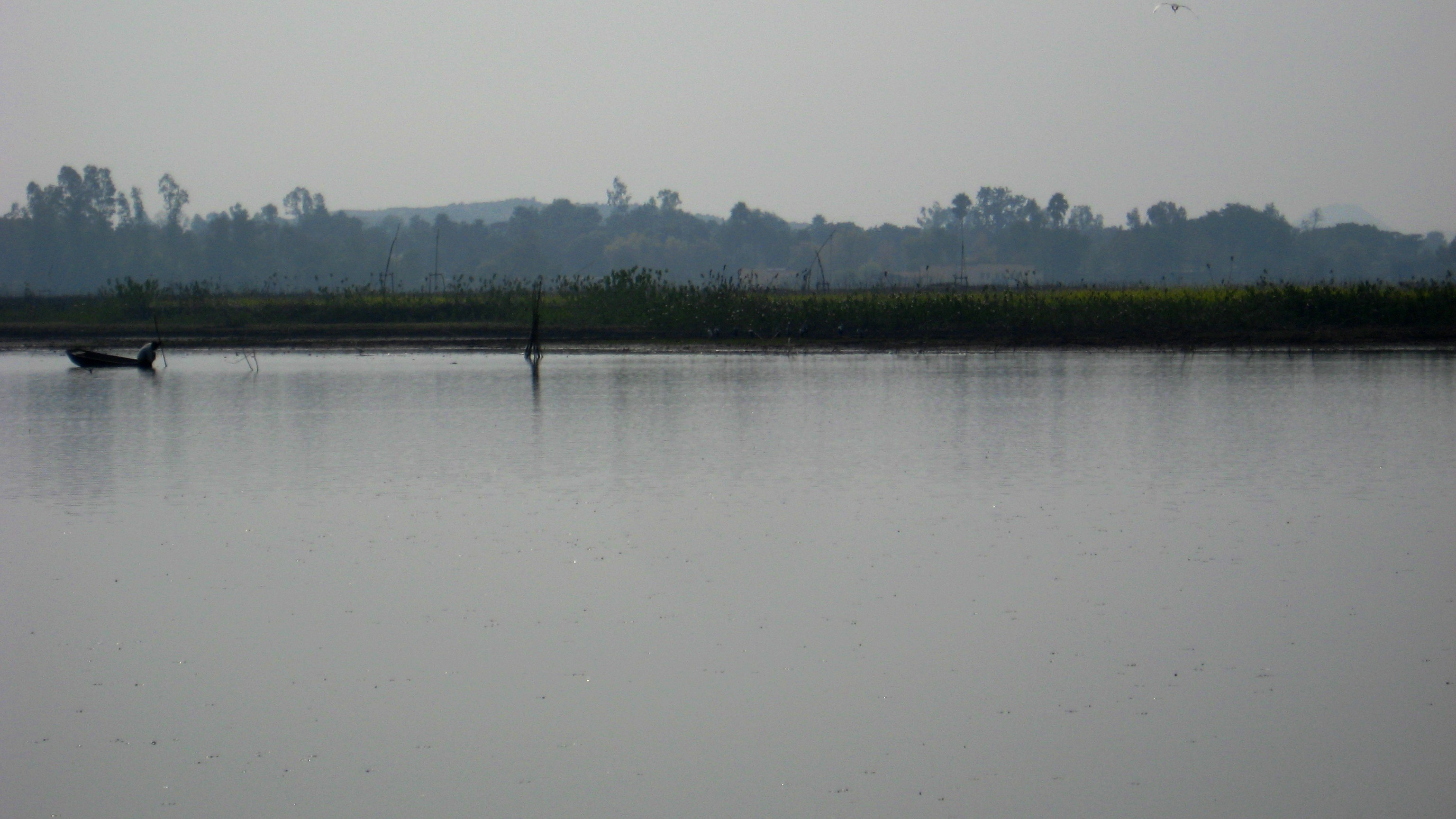
Raja ka tal

Kulpahar city's security is maintained by Kulpahar Kotwali. An officer of the cadre of Deputy Superintendent of Police heads the police administration of Kulpahar. Kulpahar Kotwali is headed by Kotwal an officer of Inspector cadre. Kulpahar police circle consists of 4 police stations namely

- Kulpahar kotwali
- Ajnar kotwali
- Panwari kotwali
- Mahobkanth kotwali

=== Water supply ===
Drinking water supply of the city is managed by Chitrakoot Jalkal Sansthaan's Jaitpur subdivision under Banda division. Water is supplied from a big reservoir Belasagar through lift irrigation to Raja Ka Tal where the Chitrakoot Jalkal Sansthaan has a water filter plant with a capacity of 15,000,000 litre per day.

== Fairs and festivals ==
All the major Indian festivals are celebrated here. The longest of them is festival of Navratra and Dussera. It is a 10-day-long festival and idols of goddess Durga are placed in many places and day-night long celebrations continues. The festival ends with the immersion of the idols in bara tal lake. Other major festivals are Holi, Diwali, Eid, Christmas and Raksha bandhan. In the month of August and September the Jalvihar fair is organized in the city. It is month-long celebration. during the opening day of fair idols of all the temples of town are taken out of the temple and a procession takes place.

== Cuisine ==
Typical north Indian food is served and taken everywhere in the town. But a typical bundeli cuisine called "bhata aur gakariya" is very popular here. It is a curry of brinjal and a specially cooked bread.

== Education ==
=== Degree colleges ===
- Sri Kishor Goswami Mahavidyalaya, near Bagaul road
- Jai Bundelkhand Mahavidyalaya, near civil hospital

=== Vocational and polytechnic ===
- Government polytechnic college

=== Intermediate education schools ===
- Jantantra Intermediate College – is affiliated to Uttar Pradesh Board of Secondary Education. It admits students from class 6th until 12th.
- Kulpahar Christian School – is affiliated to Central Board of Secondary Education (CBSE). It admits students from kindergarten until 12th.
- Government Girls Intermediate College – is affiliated to Uttar Pradesh Board of Secondary Education. It admits girls students from class 6th until 12th
- G.V. Islamiya Inter College – is affiliated to Uttar Pradesh Board of Secondary Education. It admits students from class 1st until 12th.
- Shri Ramratan Bhuvnesh Kumar Public School. It admits students from class kindergarten until 12th.
- Dr. C.V. Raman Inter College. It admits students from class 1st until 12.

=== High Sschools ===
- Kulpahar Public School

=== Junior schools ===
- Dayanand Naveen Saraswati Shishu Mandir
- Rafique Memorial Junior High School
- Govt. Adarsh Junior High School
- Govt. Girls Junior High School
- Naveen Uchchatar Madhyamik Vidyalaya
- Shri Chintamani Adarsh Vidyalaya
- Bharat Bhushan Madhyamik Vidyalaya
- Dr. C.V. Raman Higher Secondary School Nazarbagh
- Saraswati Gyan Mandir
- Aadarsh Shiksha Niketan Junior High School

=== Primary schools ===
- St. Joseph Academy
- Government Primary School, Ward No 01
- Government Primary School, Ward No 02
- Government Primary School, Ward No 03
- Government Primary School, Ward No 04
- Government Primary School, Ward No 05
- Government Primary School, Ward No 06
- Government Primary School, Ward No 07
- Government Primary School, Ward No 08
- Government Primary School, Ward No 09
- Government Primary School, Ward No 10
- Government Primary School, Ward No 11
- Government Primary School, Ward No 12
- Government Primary School, Ward No 13
- Wonder Play School
- M K Public School

== Hospitals ==
=== Government hospitals ===
- Community Health Center (Civil Hospital) Kulpahar – It is a 90-bed community hospital situated on eastern part of the city on NH-76. This hospital serves to a population of over 400,000.
- Government Ayurvedic hospital
- Government Homeopathic hospital
- Janki Clinic near main market

== Climate ==
- Summer – Max. 43 °C, Min. 20 °C
- Winter – Max. 25 °C, Min. 2 °C
- Rainfall: 660 mm (June to September)
- Best Season: August to March

== Passenger transportation ==
=== Air ===
Kulpahar is served by the Khajuraho airport (90 km) and is linked to Delhi and Varanasi by Indian Airlines. Other airports in the vicinity are Kanpur (180 km) and Lucknow (250 km).

=== Road ===
National Highway 76 runs through the center of the city. Kulpahar is located in between Jhansi and Allahabad on this highway. Another highway that links Kulpahar is National Highway 86 starts at Kanpur and ends at Sagar in Madhya Pradesh. There are other highways that link Kulpahar to other parts of the state. Kulpahar also has one bus station and a railway station catering to different routes. Regular bus services are available to nearby towns like Mahoba, Banda, Nowgaon, Charkhari, Rath, Orai, Chitrakoot, Karwi, Hamirpur and Kulpahar is also well connected with bus services to Allahabad, Varanasi, Kanpur, Lucknow, Delhi, Agra, Jhansi, Jaipur and Ajmer.

Tourist taxis, auto-rickshaws and tempos are available for local transport.

=== Rail ===
Kulpahar is a railway station of the North Central Railways Zone, and is well connected by trains with all major cities, namely, Kolkata, Delhi, Mumbai, Jhansi, Varanasi, Agra, Gwalior, Khajuraho, Udaipur, Jaipur, Jabalpur, Gaya, Mathura and Allahabad.

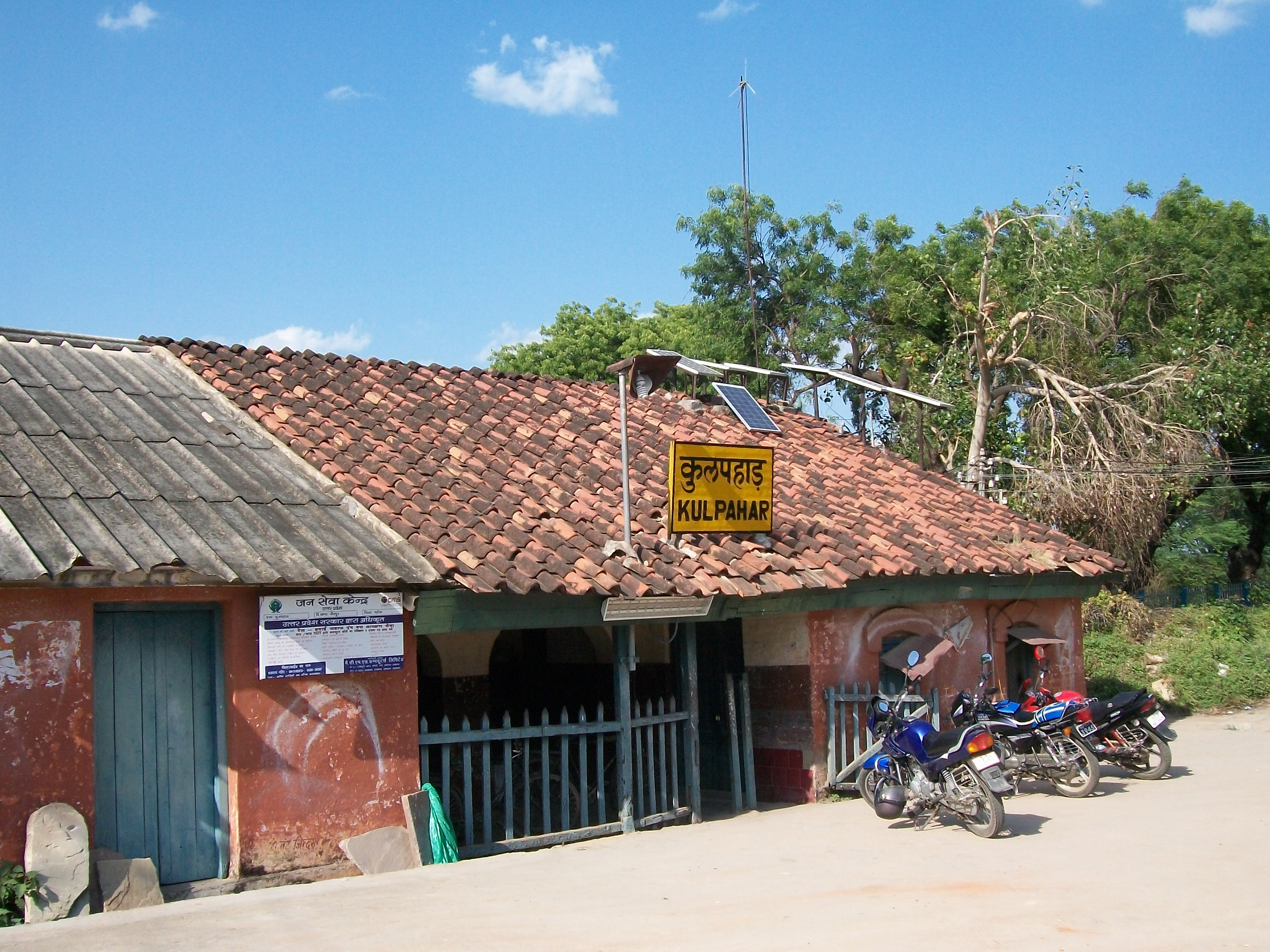
Kulpahar Railway Station

Major Trains connecting Kulpahar with rest of the country are 11107/11108 Bundelkhand Exp, 12175/12176 Gwalior-Howrah Chambal Exp, 12177/12178 Mathura-Howrah Chambal Exp, 12189/12190 Mahakoshal Exp, 11069/11070 Tulsi Exp and 12447/12448 Uttar Pradesh Sampark Kranti Exp, 19665/19666 Intercity Exp, 22447/22448 Khajuraho Link Exp.

== Granite mining in Kulpahar ==
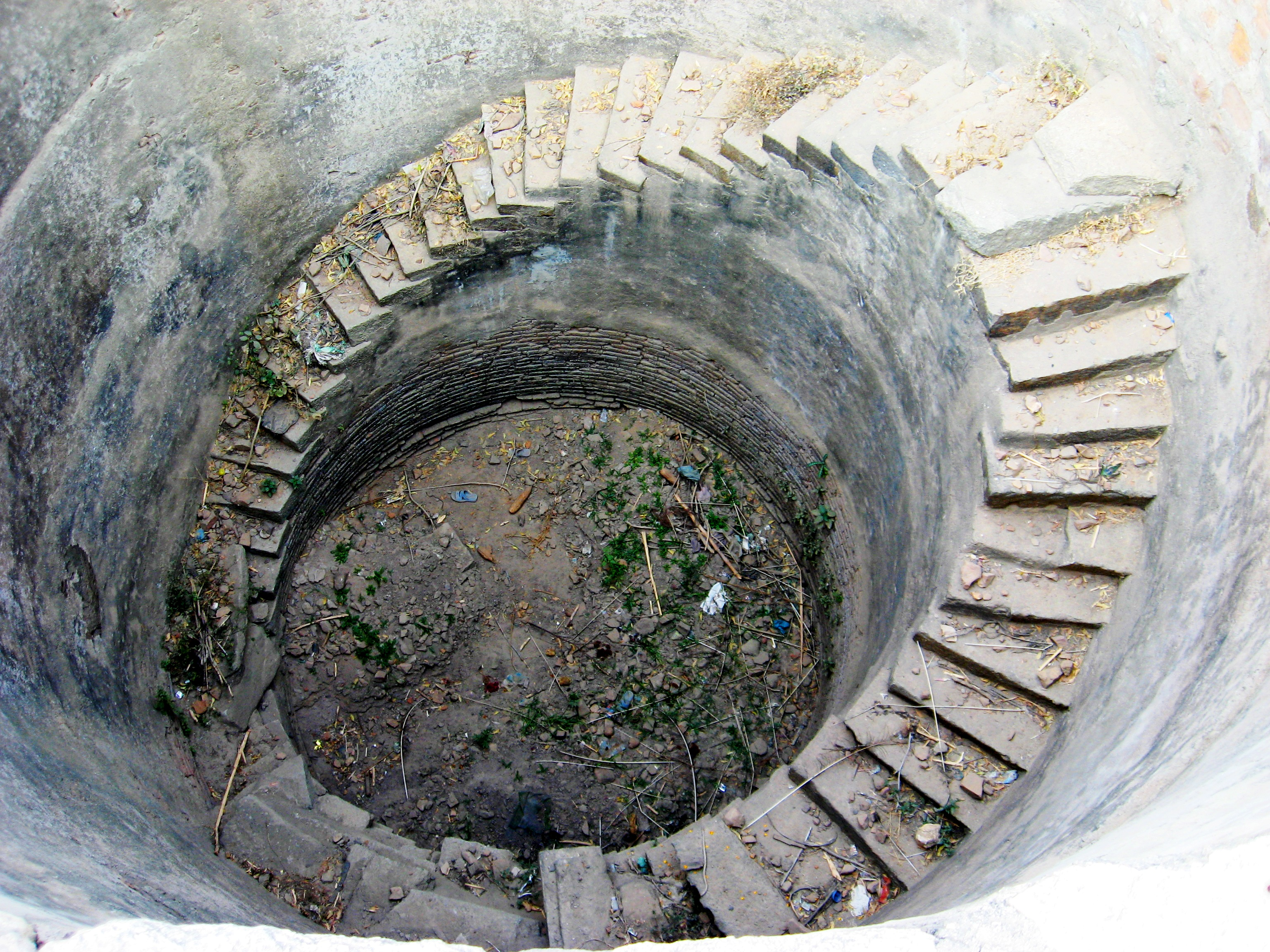
Chandela period well

Kulpahar region comprises areas which are essentially covered by grey, pink, red granitic rock and black dolerite. The rocks are generally medium to coarse to very coarse grained, having variegated colours with varying textural patterns. In geological nomenclature they can be classified on the basis of colour, grain size and texture. Over half of the areas identified so far appear suitable for extracting blocks of two cubic meters in size from the surface outcrops. The granite with red feldspar having presence of white and bluish quartz has become popular in national and international markets during the last 10 years. The remaining outcrops would be suited for blocks of smaller size. Ruby red granite is good in quality and is popular in national and international markets. In granitic terrain the rocks may occur in the form of widespread sheets exposed above the ground level, in the form of hillocks, as high ground or below the ground under soil cover. They may also occur as boulders of different size and shapes spread over the sheet rock. They may be found as dykes, particularly of black and green types, as long narrow ridges often concealed beneath the surface. A major part of granite deposits in these regions are underground and have to be extracted by open cast mining. Underground granite block is more compact and require sophisticated and specialised machinery which adds to the cost of mining.

== Excursions ==
=== Historical ===
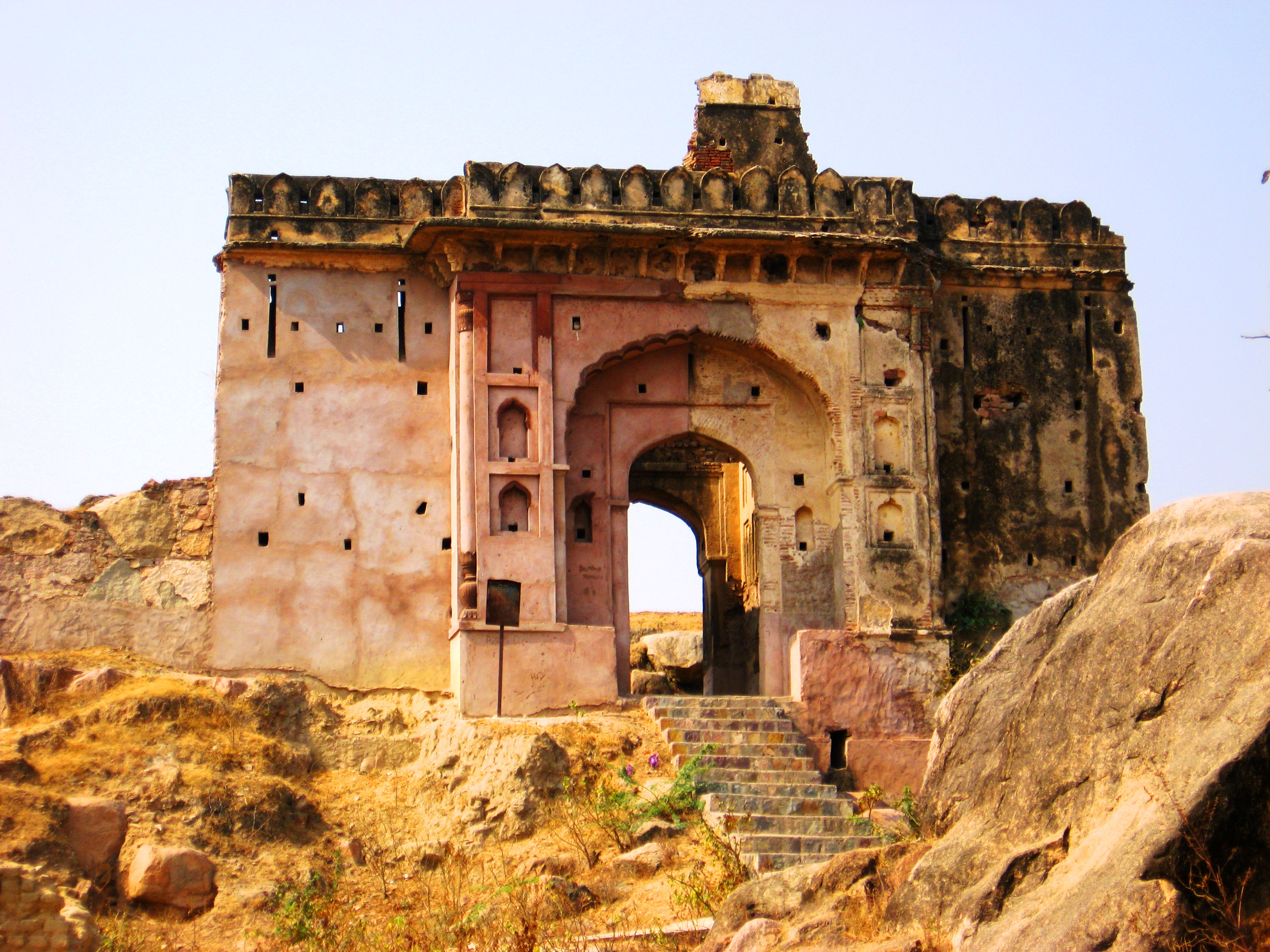
Ruins of a fortress on a hillock

- Ajaigarh: 100 km south-west of the city.
- Charkhari: 15 km north of the city.
- Jhansi: 135 km west of the city.
- Kalinjar: 150 km east-south of the city.
- Kalpi: 140 km north-west of the city.
- Khajuraho: 80 km south-east of the city.
- Mahoba: 25 km east of the city.
- Rath, India 42 km north-west of the city
- Sugira: 4 km west of the city

=== Natural ===
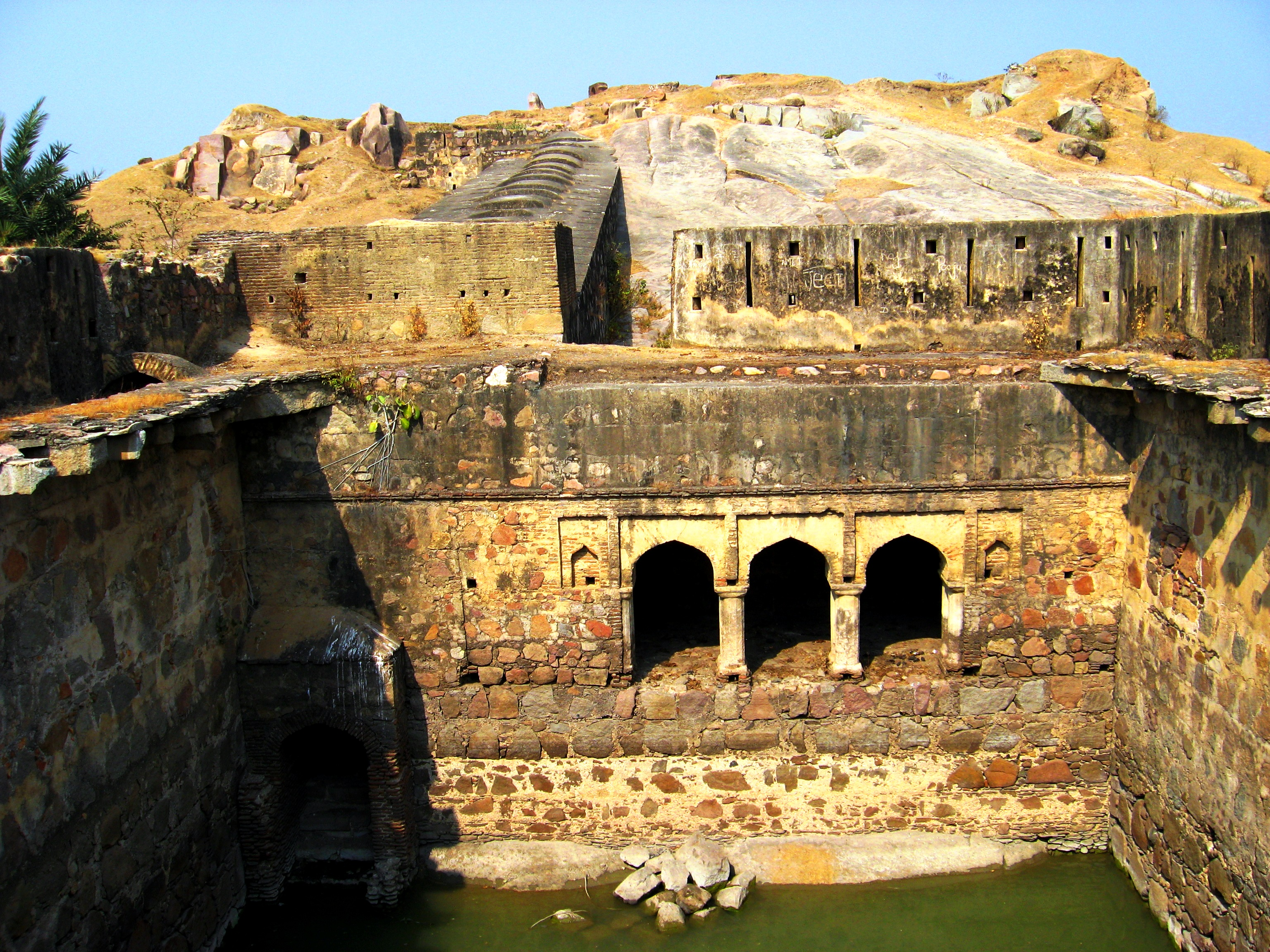
Royal bath

- Panna: 120 km south-east of the city.
- Pandav falls: 80 km south-east of the city.
- Raneh falls: 85 km south-west of the city.
- Matatila dam: 135 km west-south of the city.
- Parichha dam: 135 km west of the city.
- Baruasagar dam: 115 km west of the city.

=== Religious ===
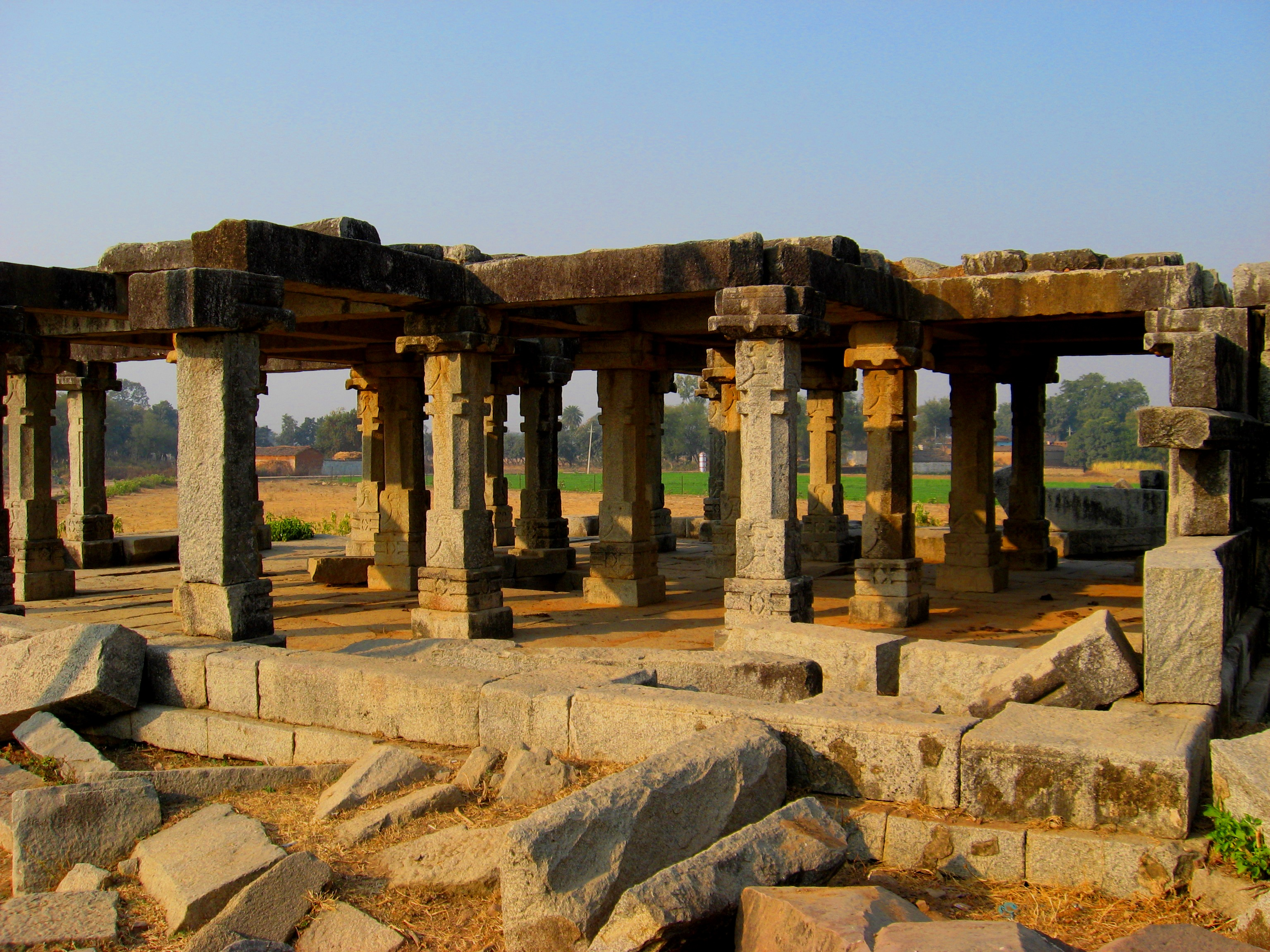
Chandela period yajna mandap

- Chitrakoot: 150 km east of the city.
- Orchha: 125 km west of the city.
- Deogarh: 145 km west-south of the city.

=== Museum ===
- Madhya Pradesh State museum Dhubela, Nowgaon
- Bundelkhand Chhatrasal Museum, Banda
- Rani Jhansi Museum, Jhansi

== Demographics ==
Religion in Kulpahar (2011)
1. Hinduism (85.0%)
2. Islam (13.7%)
3. Christianity (1.09%)
4. Buddhism (0.01%)
5. Jainism (0.01%)
6. Not Stated (0.11%)

As of 2011 India census, Kulpahar had a population of 20,096. Males constitute 52.6% of the population and females 47.4%. Kulpahar has an average literacy rate of 75.8%, higher than the national average of 74.1% with male literacy rate of 84.8% and female literacy rate of 65.8%. In Kulpahar, 12.9% of the population is under 6 years of age.

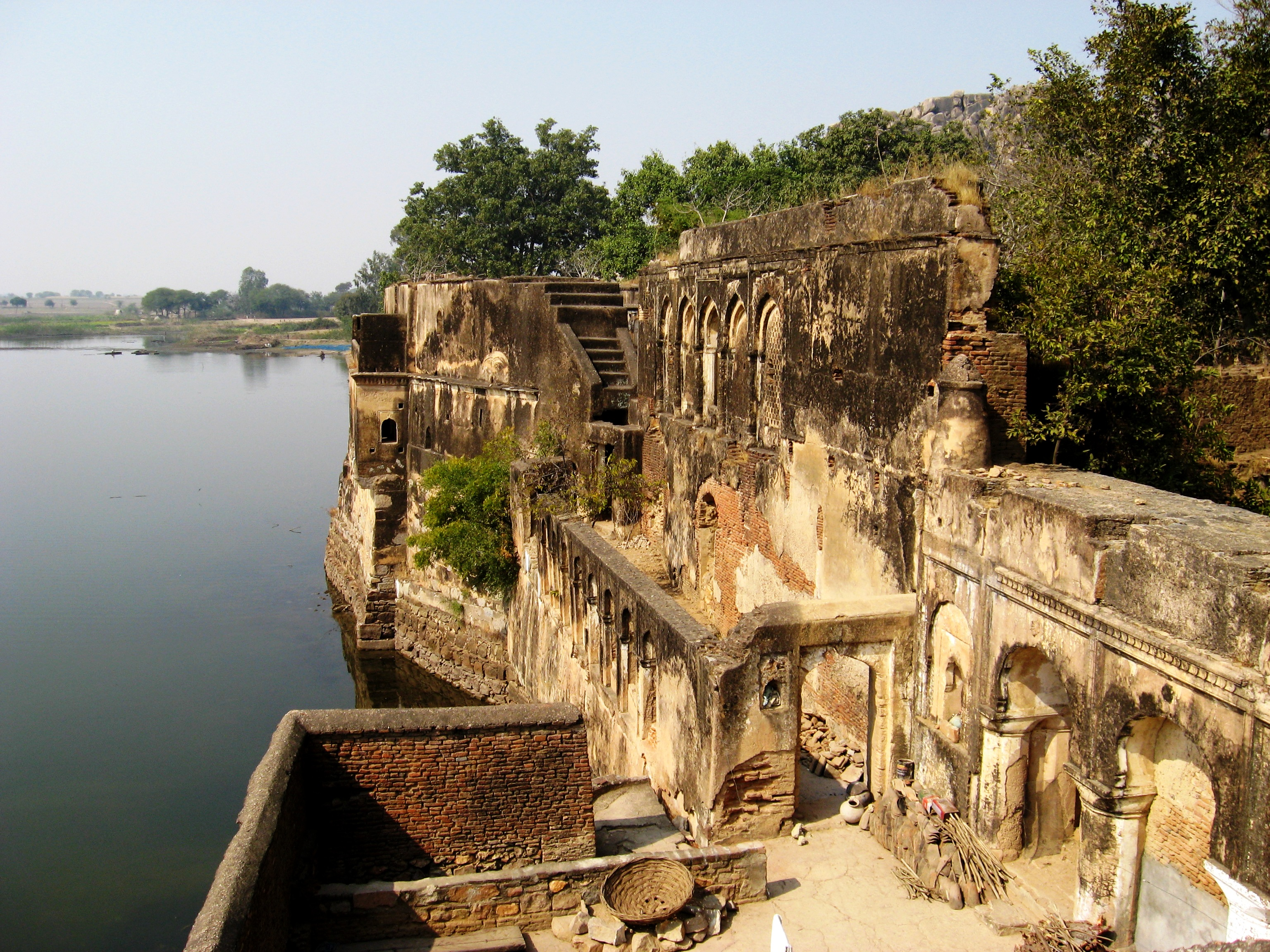
Lake side summer resort of Rajput rulers

- Total Population : 20,096
  - Male : 10,575
  - Female : 9,521
- Population 0-6 (Total) : 2,593
  - Male : 1,373
  - Female : 1,220
- Literates (Total) : 13,262
  - Male : 7,803
  - Female : 5,459
