= Mahoba Assembly constituency =

Constituency of the Uttar Pradesh legislative assembly in India

Coordinates: 25.29°N 79.87°E

Mahoba
- Constituency No. 230 for the Uttar Pradesh Legislative Assembly

Constituency details
- Country: India
- Region: North India
- State: Uttar Pradesh
- District: Mahoba
- Lok Sabha constituency: Hamirpur, Uttar Pradesh Lok Sabha constituency
- Reservation: None

Member of Legislative Assembly
- 18th Uttar Pradesh Legislative Assembly
- Incumbent Rakesh Kumar Goswami
- Party: Bharatiya Janata Party
- Alliance: NDA
- Elected year: 2022

Mahoba is a constituency of the Uttar Pradesh Legislative Assembly covering the entire sub-district of Mahoba and part of Charkhari sub-district in the Mahoba district of Uttar Pradesh, India.

Mahoba is one of five assembly constituencies in the Hamirpur Lok Sabha constituency. Since 2008, this assembly constituency is numbered 230 amongst 403 constituencies.

== Members of the Legislative Assembly ==
Election	Name	Party
2012	Rajnarain	Bahujan Samaj Party
2017	Rakesh Kumar Goswami	Bharatiya Janata Party
2022	Rakesh Kumar Goswami	Bharatiya Janata Party

== Election results ==
=== 2027 ===
2027 Uttar Pradesh Legislative Assembly election: Mahoba
Party	Candidate	Votes	%	±%
INDIA				
NDA				
BSP				
NOTA	None of the above			
Majority				
Turnout				
gain from		Swing		

=== 2022 ===
2022 Uttar Pradesh Legislative Assembly election: Mahoba
Party	Candidate	Votes	%	±%
BJP	Rakesh Kumar Goswami	94,490	45.61	▲0.85
SP	Manoj Tiwari	51,043	24.64	▼4.21
BSP	Sanjay Kumar Sahu	38,296	18.48	▼2.77
INC	Sagar Singh	9,423	4.55	
Jan Adhikar Party	Kuldeep Kushwaha	4,556	2.2	▲1.58
NOTA	None of the above	1,514	0.73	▼0.67
Majority		43,447	20.97	▲5.06
Turnout		207,179	65.4	▼0.61
BJP hold		Swing		

=== 2017 ===
Bharatiya Janta Party candidate Rakesh Kumar Goswami won in 2017 Uttar Pradesh Legislative Elections defeating Samajwadi Party candidate Siddh Gopal Sahu by a margin of 31,387 votes.

2017 Uttar Pradesh Legislative Assembly Election: Mahob
Party	Candidate	Votes	%	±%
BJP	Rakesh Kumar Goswami	88,291	44.76	
SP	Siddh Gopal Sahu	56,904	28.85	
BSP	Arimardan Singh	41,915	21.25	
NOTA	None of the above	2,720	1.4	
Majority		31,387	15.91	
Turnout		197,273	66.01	
