= Senapati fortress =

Historic fortress in Kulpahar, India

Coordinates: 25°17′N 79°52′E

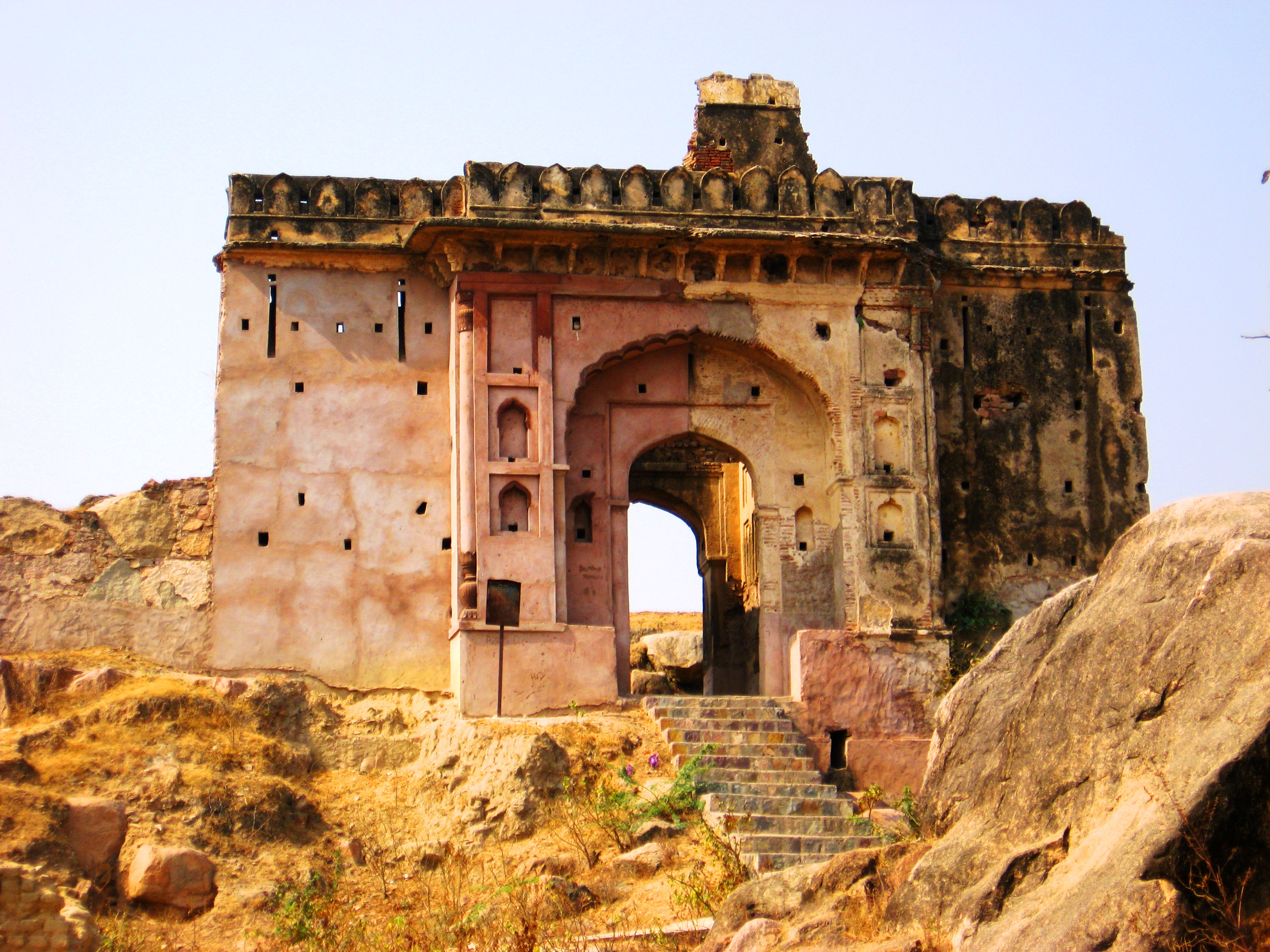
Ruins of the fortress

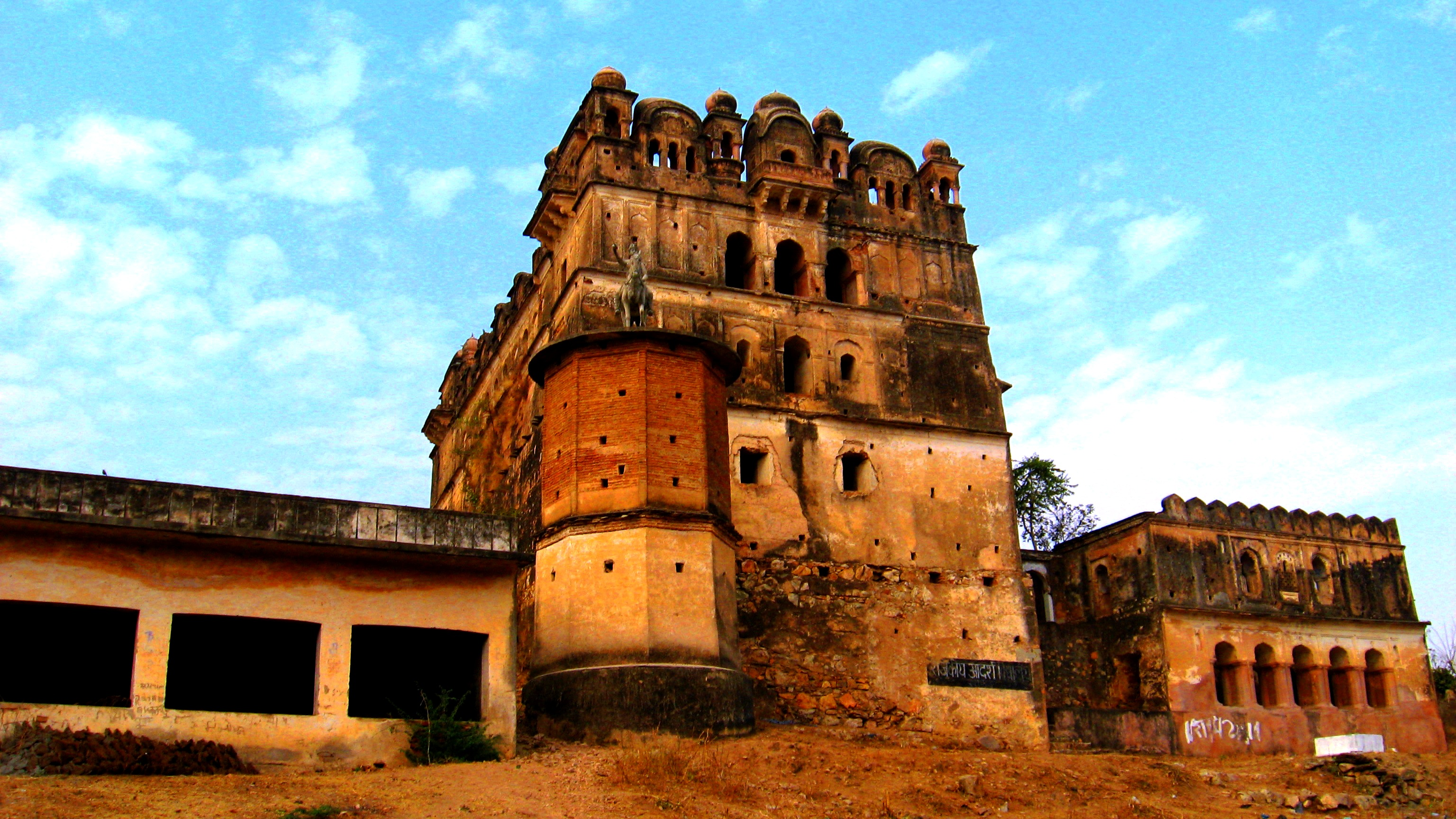
Senapati

Senapati fortress was built in 1700 A.D. by Senapati of Chhatrasal Bundela on a hill at the western end of the city at Kulpahar. The fort was demolished by the British in 1804 A.D.

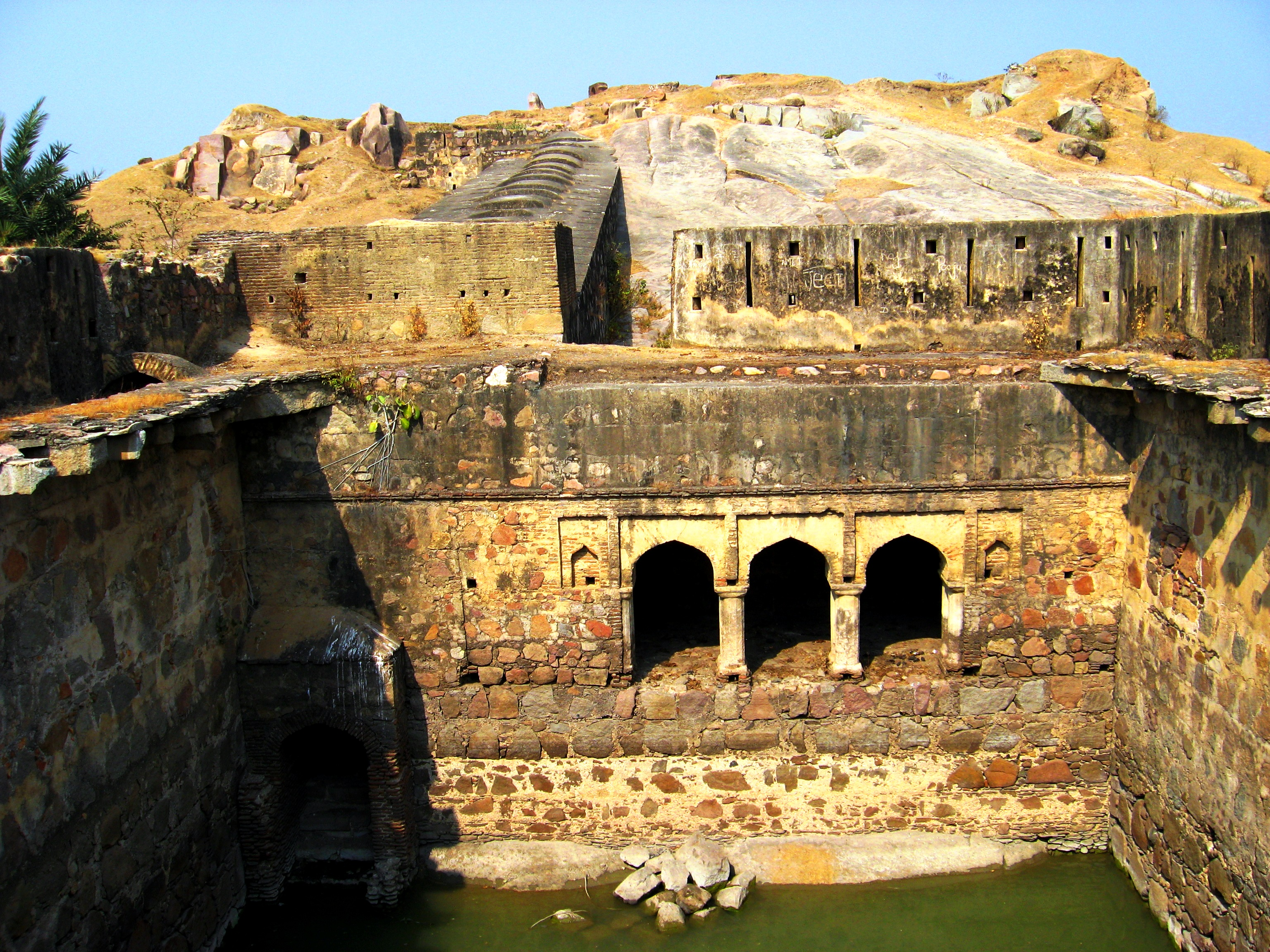
Senapati bath

== See also ==
- Senapati Mahal
