= Salat, Kulpahar =

Coordinates: 27°34′14″N 80°05′53″E

- village
- Interactive map of Salat, Kulpahar
- Country: India
- State: Uttar Pradesh

Government
  - Body: Gram panchayat

Languages
  - Official: Hindi
- Time zone: UTC+5:30 (IST)
- Vehicle registration: UP
- Website: up.gov.in

Salat is a village in Kulpahar subdistrict in Uttar Pradesh, India.
