= Rawatpura, Kulpahar =

Rawatpura
- village
- Chandela temple near Rawatpura lake

- Location in Uttar Pradesh, India Rawatpura (India)
- Coordinates: 25.260687°N 79.662724°E
- Country: India
- State: Uttar Pradesh

Government
  - Body: Gram panchayat

Languages
  - Official: Hindi
- Time zone: UTC+5:30 (IST)
- Vehicle registration: UP
- Website: up.gov.in

Rawatpura is a tiny village 10 km east of Kulpahar, in the state of Uttar Pradesh, India. It has many ruins of temples of the Chandela dynasty.
