= Sugira =

Sugira, formerly known as Kunwarpur is a village in India. It lies between Kulpahar and Rath on National Highway 76 4 km from Kulpahar towards Jhansi. Sugira was counted as a model village before 1980.
