= Barua Sagar =

- town
- Location in Uttar Pradesh, India Barua Sagar (India)
- Coordinates: 25°22′29.319″N 78°43′55.14″E
- Country: India
- State: Uttar Pradesh
- District: Jhansi

Government
  - Type: BJP
  - Body: Rajeev Singh "Paricha"

Population (2011)
  - Total: 25,028

Languages
  - Official: Hindi
- Time zone: UTC+5:30 (IST)
- PIN: 284201
- Website: up.gov.in

Barua Sagar is a town and a municipal board in Jhansi district in the state of Uttar Pradesh, India. It was named for the lake called Barua Sagar Tal. A Maharshi Shringirishi Temple is also located near lakeside.

== Demographics ==
As of 2011 India census, Barua Sagar had a population of 22,075. Males constitute 53% of the population and females 47%. Barua Sagar has an average literacy rate of 71.62%, higher than the state average of 67.68%; with 81.07% of the males and 61.43% of females literate. 13% of the population is under 6 years of age. Human sex ratio of Barua Sagar is 920 females per 1000 males which is higher than state average of 912. However, child sex ratio of Barua Sagar is 873 compared to state average of 902 females per thousand males. 92% of the population of Barua Sagar is Hindu, 6.48% Muslim, 0.04% Christian, 1.95% Jains and other minority groups.
