= Rakesh Kumar Goswami =

Indian politician (born 1954)

Member of Uttar Pradesh Legislative Assembly
- Incumbent
- Assumed office March 2017
- Preceded by: Raj Narain Alias Rajju
- Constituency: Mahoba

Personal details
- Born: 26 January 1954 (age 72) Mahoba, Uttar Pradesh
- Party: Bharatiya Janata Party
- Education: Bachelor of Laws
- Alma mater: Bundelkhand University
- Profession: Politician

Rakesh Kumar Goswami is an Indian politician and a member of the 18th Uttar Pradesh Assembly from the Mahoba Assembly constituency of the Mahoba district. He is a member of the Bharatiya Janata Party. He was elected as MLA 1st time in 2007 from Bahujan Samaj Party.

== Early life ==
Rakesh Kumar Goswami was born on 26 January 1954 in Mahoba, Uttar Pradesh, to a Hindu family of Kishori Kishore Goswami. He married Gayatri Goswami on 27 February 1984, and they had one child.

== Education ==
Rakesh Kumar Goswami completed his education with a Bachelor of Laws at Bundelkhand University, Jhansi.

== Posts held ==
#	From	To	Position	Ref				
01	March 2007	March 2017	Member, 15th Uttar Pradesh Assembly		02	March 2017	March 2022	Member, 17th Uttar Pradesh Assembly
03	March 2022	Incumbent	Member, 18th Uttar Pradesh Assembly					

== See also ==
- 18th Uttar Pradesh Assembly
- Mahoba Assembly constituency
- Uttar Pradesh Legislative Assembly
