= Kabrai =

- city
- Location in Uttar Pradesh, India
- Coordinates: 25.42°N 80.02°E
- Country: India
- State: Uttar Pradesh
- District: Mahoba
- Elevation: 157 m (515 ft)

Population (2011)
  - Total: 28,564

Languages
  - Official: HindiBundeli, Bundelkhandi
- Time zone: UTC+5:30 (IST)
- Postal code: 210424

Kabrai is a city, a nagar Panchayat, and a combination of 5 villages in Mahoba district, Bundelkhand region, Uttar Pradesh, India. Kabrai is a City where stone mining is leading business. There are around 350 stone crushers in and around the town. Most of city's revenue comes from mining. Kabrai is situated between Banda and Mahoba and well connected by NH 86 and NH 76 Kanpur Kabrai Road. Kabrai is well also by rail. One can board trains from Kabrai Railway Station.

== Geography ==
Kabrai is located at 25.42°N 80.02°E. It has an average elevation of 157 metres (515 feet).

== Demographics ==
Kabrai Nagar Panchayat has population of 28,564 of which 15,215 are males while 13,349 are females as per report released by Census India 2011.

The population of children aged 0-6 is 4535 which is 15.88% of total population of Kabrai (NP). In Kabrai Nagar Panchayat, the female sex ratio is 877 against state average of 912. Moreover the child sex ratio in Kabrai is around 914 compared to Uttar Pradesh state average of 902. The literacy rate of Kabrai city is 68.93% higher than the state average of 67.68%. In Kabrai, male literacy is around 78.44% while the female literacy rate is 58.01%.
