= Charkhari State =

Princely state of India

Coordinates: 25.4°N 79.75°E

- Princely State of British India
- 1765–1947
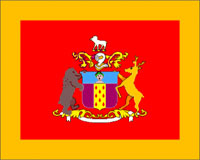
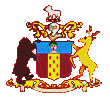
- Flag Coat of arms

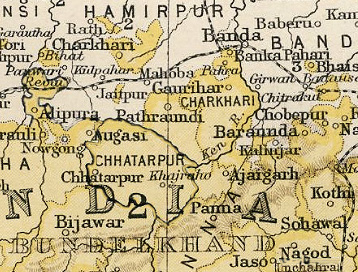
- Charkhari State in the Imperial Gazetteer of India
- Capital: Charkhari
- Area
  - 1901: 2,279 km^{2} (880 sq mi)
- Population
  - 1901: 123,254
- History
  - Established: 1765
  - Accession to the Union of India: 1947
Succeeded by
India

Charkhari State was one of the Princely states of India during the period of the British Raj. On India's independence, this Princely state acceded to India. Currently Charkhari town, the former state's capital, is a part of Uttar Pradesh state.

== History ==
Charkhari State was founded in 1765 by Khuman Singh Bundela. Raja Chhatarsal Bundela divided his lands in 1731 into several portions, one of which was given to Raja Jagat Rai. At his death in 1757, a dispute arose as to the succession, with Raja Pahar Singh, seizing the territory forcing Raja Khuman Singh to flee. Terms were agreed to in 1764, and Raja Khuman Singh received Charkhari, becoming its first Raja in 1765.

=== Maratha Conquest ===
In the year 1789 Arjun Pawar the diwan and general of Ali Bahadur I attacked Vijay Bahadur and expelled him.

In 1857, Raja Ratan Singh received a hereditary salute of 11 guns, a khilat, and a perpetual jagir of Rs. 20,000 (£1,300) a year in recognition of his services during the Indian Mutiny.

The last ruler of this Princely state signed the accession to the Indian Union on 15 August 1947.

== Rulers ==
In 1804, under Raja Bikramajit Singh Bundela (1782–1829) rule, the state became a British protectorate.

Name	Arms	Birth	Reign From	Reign Until	Death	Note
Khuman Singh Bundela	Arms of the Charkhari		1765	1782		
Bikramajit Singh Bundela (Vikramaditya or Vijay Bahadur Singh)	Arms of the Charkhari		1782	1829		
Ratan Singh Bundela	Arms of the Charkhari		1829	1860		
Jai Singh Deo Bundela	Arms of the Charkhari		1860	1880		
Malkhan Singh Ju Deo Bundela	Arms of the Charkhari		1880	6 July 1908		
Jujhar Singh Ju Deo Bundela	Arms of the Charkhari		6 July 1908	1914		
Ganga Singh Ju Deo Bundela	Arms of the Charkhari		1914	5 October 1920		
Arimardan Singh Ju Deo Bundela	Arms of the Charkhari		1920	8 November 1941		
Jayendra Singh Ju Deo Bundela	Arms of the Charkhari		8 November 1941	15 August 1947	1977	Due to 26th Amendment to the Constitution of India, he ceased to enjoy his princely pensions, titles, and privileges.
Jayant Singh Ju Deo Bundela	Arms of the Charkhari		1977			Pretender

== See also ==
- Bundelkhand Agency
- Political integration of India
