= Mahoba district =

- District of Uttar Pradesh
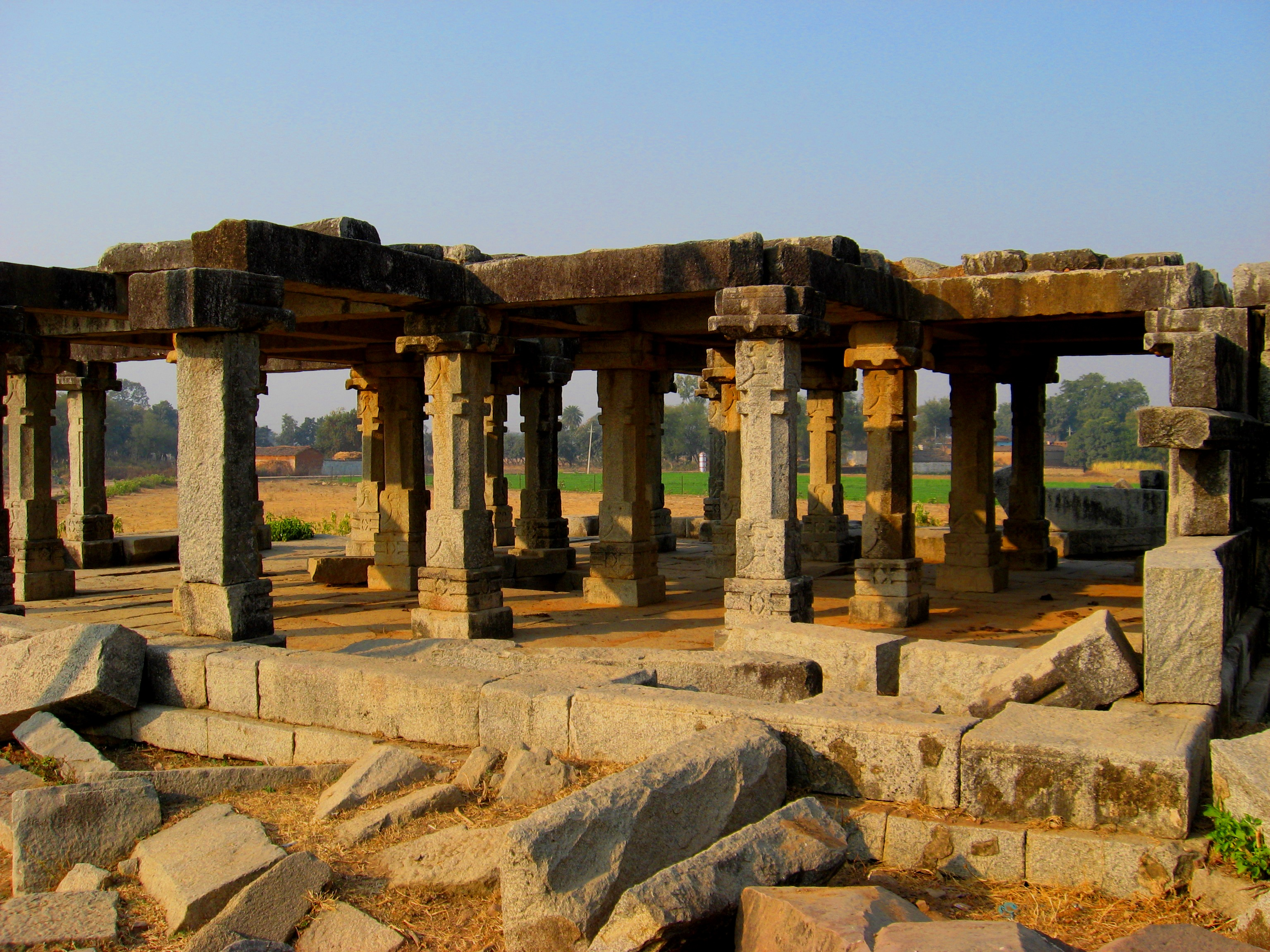
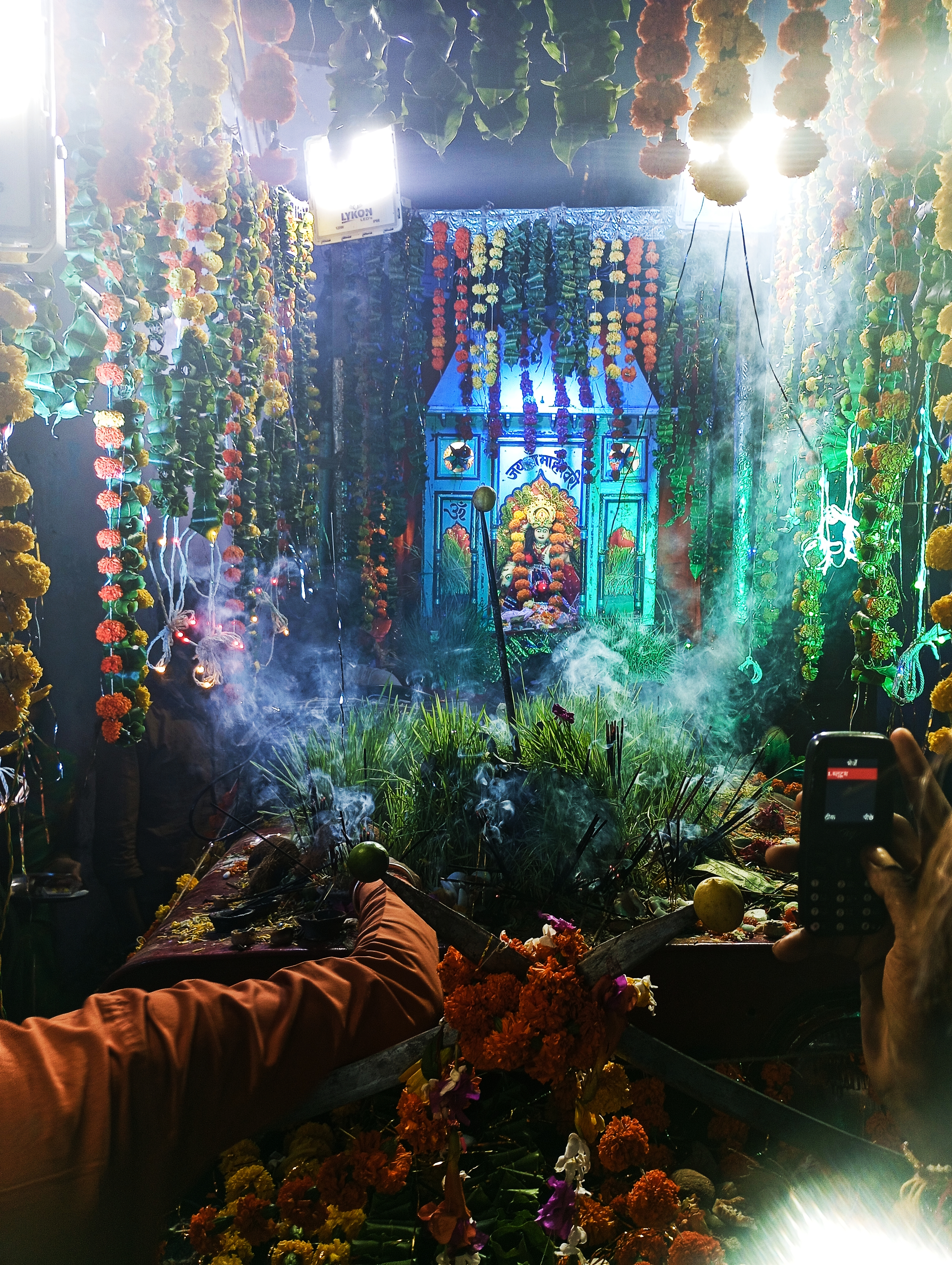
- Chandela-era Yajna Mandapa in Kulpahar; Maheshwari Mata Charkhari,

- Location of Mahoba district in Uttar Pradesh
- Coordinates (Mahoba): 25°17′24″N 79°52′12″E
- Country: India
- State: Uttar Pradesh
- Division: Chitrakoot
- Headquarters: Mahoba
- Tehsils: 1. Kulpahar 2. Charkhari 3. Mahoba

Government
  - District magistrate: Gazal Bhardwaj
  - Vidhan Sabha constituencies: Mahoba and Charkhari

Area
  - Total: 3,144 km^{2} (1,214 sq mi)

Population (2011)
  - Total: 875,958
  - Density: 279/km^{2} (720/sq mi)
  - Urban: 185,381
- Time zone: UTC+05:30 (IST)
- Major highways: 86
- Website: mahoba.nic.in

Mahoba district is a district of the Indian state of Uttar Pradesh. Headquartered in the city of Mahoba, the district had a population of a population of 875,958 as of the 2011 Indian census and occupies 2884 km^{2} within the Chitrakoot division of Uttar Pradesh. As of 2011 it was the least populous district of Uttar Pradesh (out of 75). Mahoba District is also known as Alha-Udal Nagari.

== Divisions ==
The district comprises three tehsils: Mahoba, Charkhari and Kulpahar, comprising four development blocks: Kabrai, Charkhari, Jaitpur and Panwadi.

There are five urban local bodies (two Nagar Palika Parishads and three Nagar Panchayats): Mahoba (NPP), Charkhari (NPP), Kabrai (NP), Kulpahar (NP) and Kharela (NP).

There are 10 police stations including woman police station in the district.

=== General administration ===
The district is a part of Chitrakoot division, headed by the Divisional Commissioner, who is an IAS officer of high seniority. The District Magistrate & Collector, hence, reports to the Divisional Commissioner of Chitrakoot Division. The current Divisional Commissioner is Dinesh Kumar Singh (IAS).

Mahoba district administration is headed by the District Magistrate & Collector (DM), who is an IAS officer. The DM is in charge of land revenue, law and order and supervises all development activities the district.

The District Magistrate is assisted by one Chief Development Officer, one Additional District Magistrate i.e. ADM (Finance & Revenue), and three Sub Divisional Magistrates. The current DM of Mahoba is Manoj Kumar Chauhan (IAS).

=== Police administration ===
Mahoba district comes under Prayagraj police zone and Chitrakoot police range of Uttar Pradesh Police. Prayagraj zone is headed by an IPS officer in the rank of Additional Director General of Police (ADG), whereas Chitrakoot range is headed by an IPS officer in the rank of Inspector General of Police (IG).

District Police of Mahoba is headed by the Superintendent of Police (SP) who is an IPS officer and is accountable to the District Magistrate for Law and Order enforcement. He is assisted by one Additional Superintendent of Police. The Mahoba district is divided into three police circles, each headed by a Circle Officer in the rank of Deputy Superintendent of Police. The current SP is Aparna Gupta.

== Demographics ==
Historical population
Year	Pop.	±% p.a.
1901	228,109	—
1911	232,675	+0.20%
1921	222,882	−0.43%
1931	238,012	+0.66%
1941	270,832	+1.30%
1951	278,070	+0.26%
1961	330,681	+1.75%
1971	411,748	+2.22%
1981	504,866	+2.06%
1991	625,053	+2.16%
2001	758,379	+1.95%
2011	875,958	+1.45%

Religions in Mahoba district (2011)
Religion	Percent
Hinduism	93.06%
Islam	6.56%
Other or not stated	0.38%
Distribution of religions

According to the 2011 census Mahoba district has a population of 875,958, roughly equal to the nation of Fiji or the US state of Delaware. This gives it a ranking of 469th in India (out of a total of 640). The district has a population density of 288 inhabitants per square kilometre (750/sq mi). Its population growth rate over the decade 2001-2011 was 23.66%. Mahoba has a sex ratio of 880 females for every 1000 males, and a literacy rate of 66.94%. 21.16% of the population lives in urban areas. Scheduled Castes made up 25.22% of the population.

Languages of Mahoba district (2011)
1. Hindi (65.5%)
2. Bundeli (33.6%)
3. Others (0.87%)

At the time of the 2011 Census of India, 65.50% of the population in the district spoke Hindi and 33.63% Bundeli as their first language.

== Politics ==
There are two Vidhan Sabha constituencies in this district: Mahoba and Charkhari. Both are part of Hamirpur Lok Sabha constituency. In 2017 Uttar Pradesh Legislative Assembly election, Rakesh Kumar Goswami was elected from Mahoba, re-elected in 2022. While Brijbhushan Rajpoot was elected from Charkhari in the 2022 Uttar Pradesh Legislative Assembly election.

== Notable people ==
- Ashok Kumar Singh Chandel - MLA, BJP
- Pushpendra Singh Chandel, MP, BJP
- Ganga Charan Rajput, Ex. MP

== Economy ==
In 2006 the Ministry of Panchayati Raj named Mahoba one of the country's 250 most backward districts (out of a total of 640). It is one of the 34 districts in Uttar Pradesh currently receiving funds from the Backward Regions Grant Fund Programme (BRGF).

Mahoba economy mainly depends on Mining and Solar farms. Mostly of people are do Agriculture related works. Kabrai is a City where stone mining is leading business. It is also known as stone city of uttar pradesh. There are around 350 stone crushers in and around the town. Most of city's revenue comes from mining. Some solar power plant are operated in mahoba district. That's playing major role in economy of district, Most people are dependent on agriculture and Other small job's.

== Geographical indication ==
Mahoba Desawari Pan was awarded the Geographical Indication (GI) status tag from the Geographical Indications Registry, under the Union Government of India, on 14 September 2021 which is valid upto 4 February 2023.

Chaurasiya Samaj Sewa Samiti from Mahoba, proposed the GI registration of 'Mahoba Desawari Pan'. After filing the application in February 2013, the Betel leaf was granted the GI tag in 2021 by the Geographical Indication Registry in Chennai, making the name "Mahoba Desawari Pan" exclusive to the Betel leaf cultivated in the region. It thus became the second Betel leaf variety from India after Mysore Betel Leaf and the 36th type of goods from Uttar Pradesh along with being the 12th type of goods from Madhya Pradesh to earn the GI tag.

The prestigious GI tag, awarded by the GI registry, certifies that a product possesses distinct qualities, adheres to traditional production methods, and has earned a reputation rooted in its geographical origin.
