= Brijbhushan Rajpoot =

Indian politician

Brijbhushan Rajput

Member of the Legislative Assembly (India)
- In office 2017–Present
- Preceded by: Urmila Devi
- Constituency: Charkhari

Personal details
- Party: Bharatiya Janata Party
- Occupation: MLA
- Profession: Politician
- Nickname: Guddu Bhaiya

Brijbhushan Rajpoot is an Indian politician and a member of 17th Uttar Pradesh Assembly of Charkhari, Uttar Pradesh of India. He represents the Charkhari constituency of Uttar Pradesh and is a member of the Bharatiya Janata Part.

== Political career ==
Brijbhushan Rajpoot is a son of Ganga Charan Rajput (ex M.P. Loksabha and Rajya Sabha) has been a member of the 17th Legislative Assembly of Uttar Pradesh. Since 2017, he has represented the Charkhari constituency and is a member of the BJP.

On 29 November 2018, Rajpoot made a 5-year-old disabled boy MLA for a day.

== Posts held ==
#	From	To	Position	Comments
1.	2017	Present	Member, 17th Legislative Assembly	
2.	2010	2015	Sena Pramukh (Bundelkhand Adhikar Sena)	

== See also ==
- Uttar Pradesh Legislative Assembly
