= Belasagar Lake =

- Location within Uttar Pradesh
- Location: Uttar Pradesh
- Coordinates: 25.264155°N 79.588437°E
- Type: artificial lake
- Basin countries: India
- Settlements: Kulpahar and Jaitpur

Belasagar Lake it is situated 10 km south of Kulpahar in Belatal village of Mahoba, Uttar Pradesh, India. This lake is a source for irrigation in the area. This lake is also known as Bela Taal locally.
