= Akona =

Village in Uttar Pradesh near Rath, India

- village
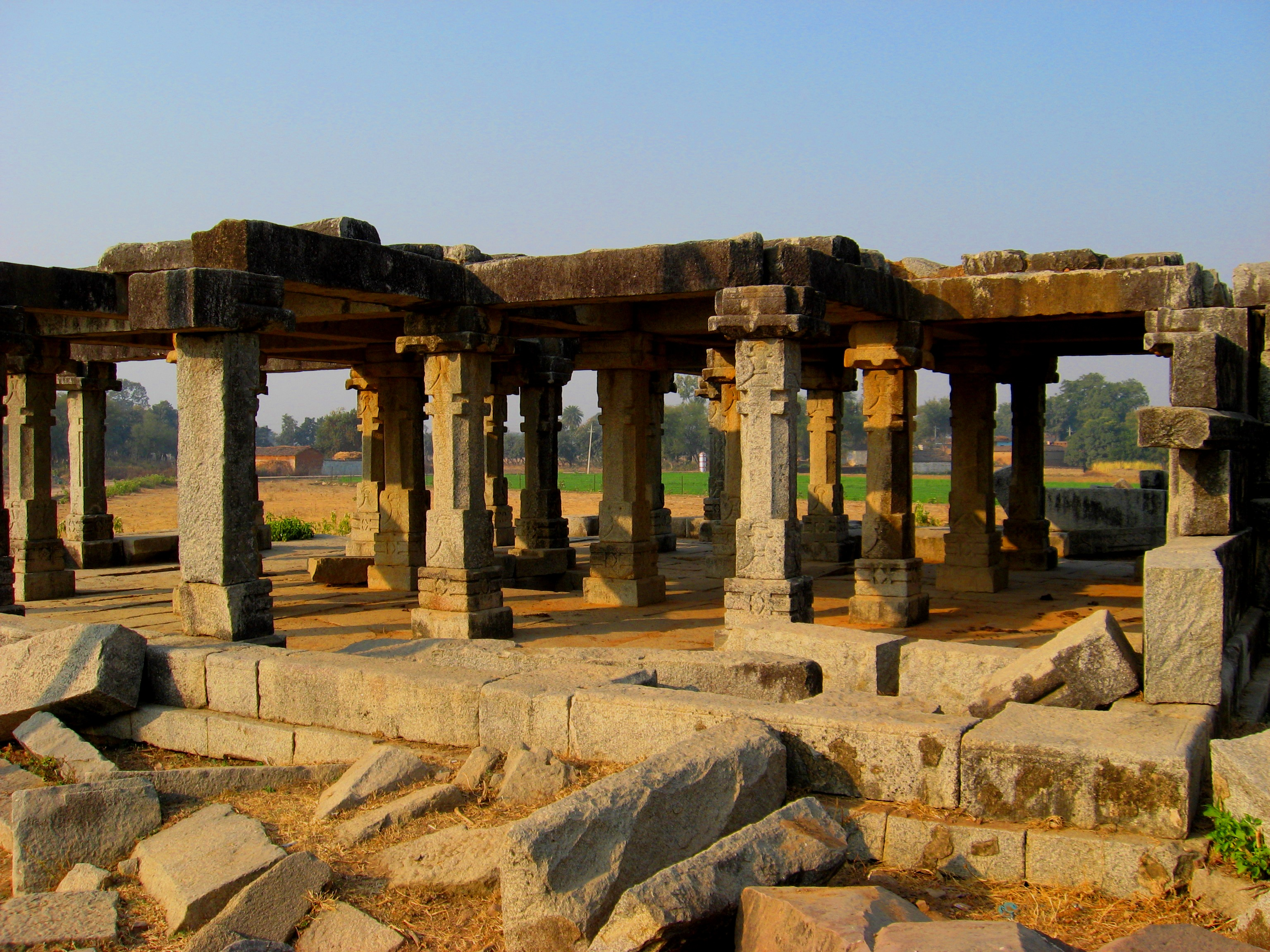
- Chandela period yajna mandap

- Location in Uttar Pradesh, India Akona (India)
- Coordinates: 25°11′51″N 79°38′9″E
- Country: India
- State: Uttar Pradesh

Government
  - Body: Gram panchayat

Languages
  - Official: Hindi
- Time zone: UTC+5:30 (IST)
- Vehicle registration: UP
- Website: up.gov.in

Akona is a small village 15 km south-east of Kulpahar. It has ruins from the Chandela period.
