= Barua Sagar Tal =

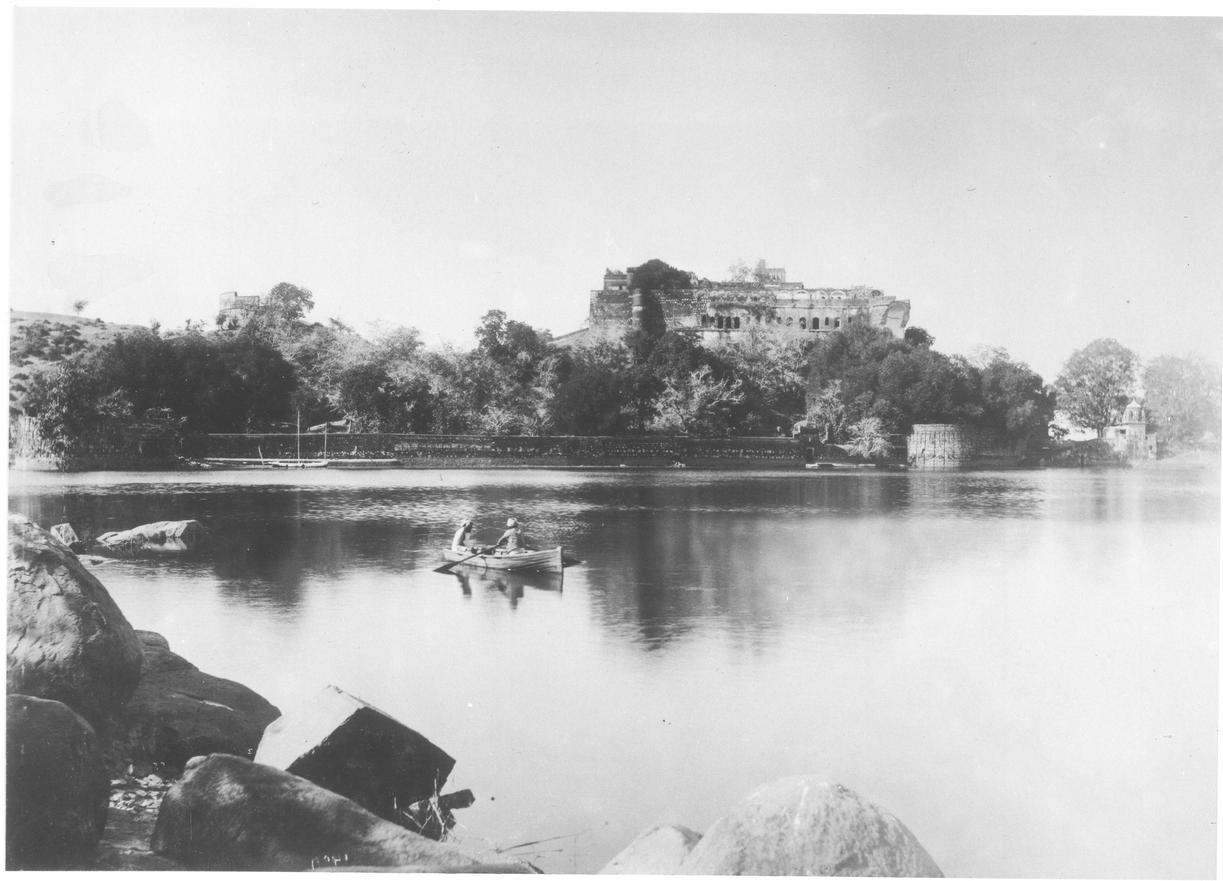
- The lake in 1882

- Location within Uttar Pradesh
- Location: Barua Sagar, Uttar Pradesh
- Coordinates: 25.368°N 78.748°E
- Type: artificial lake
- Basin countries: India

Barua Sagar Tal is a large lake in Barua Sagar near Jhansi in the Indian state of Uttar Pradesh.

== History ==
It is a large lake created about 260 years ago by Raja Udit Singh of Orchha, who built the embankment. According to reports in media, the dam is claimed to be built around 1694 A.D.

== Gallery ==
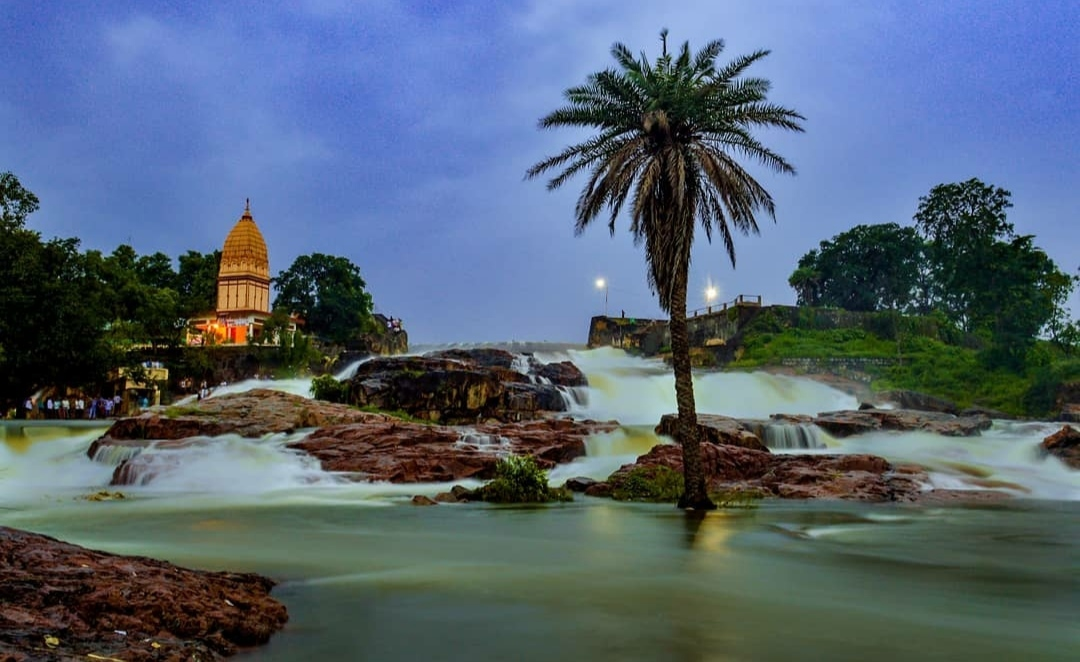
Barua Sagar Dam

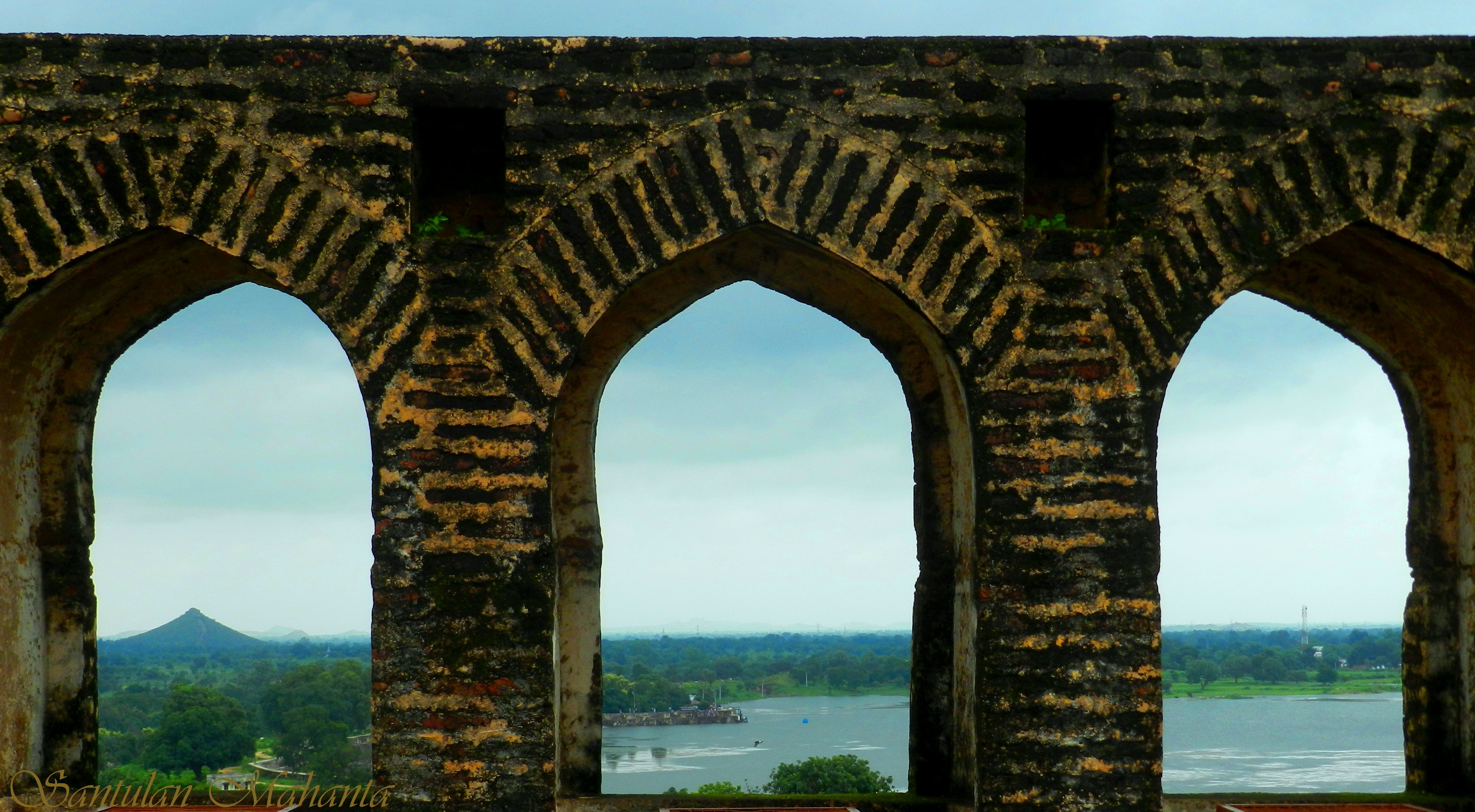
Windows with a view of Bundelkhand down below

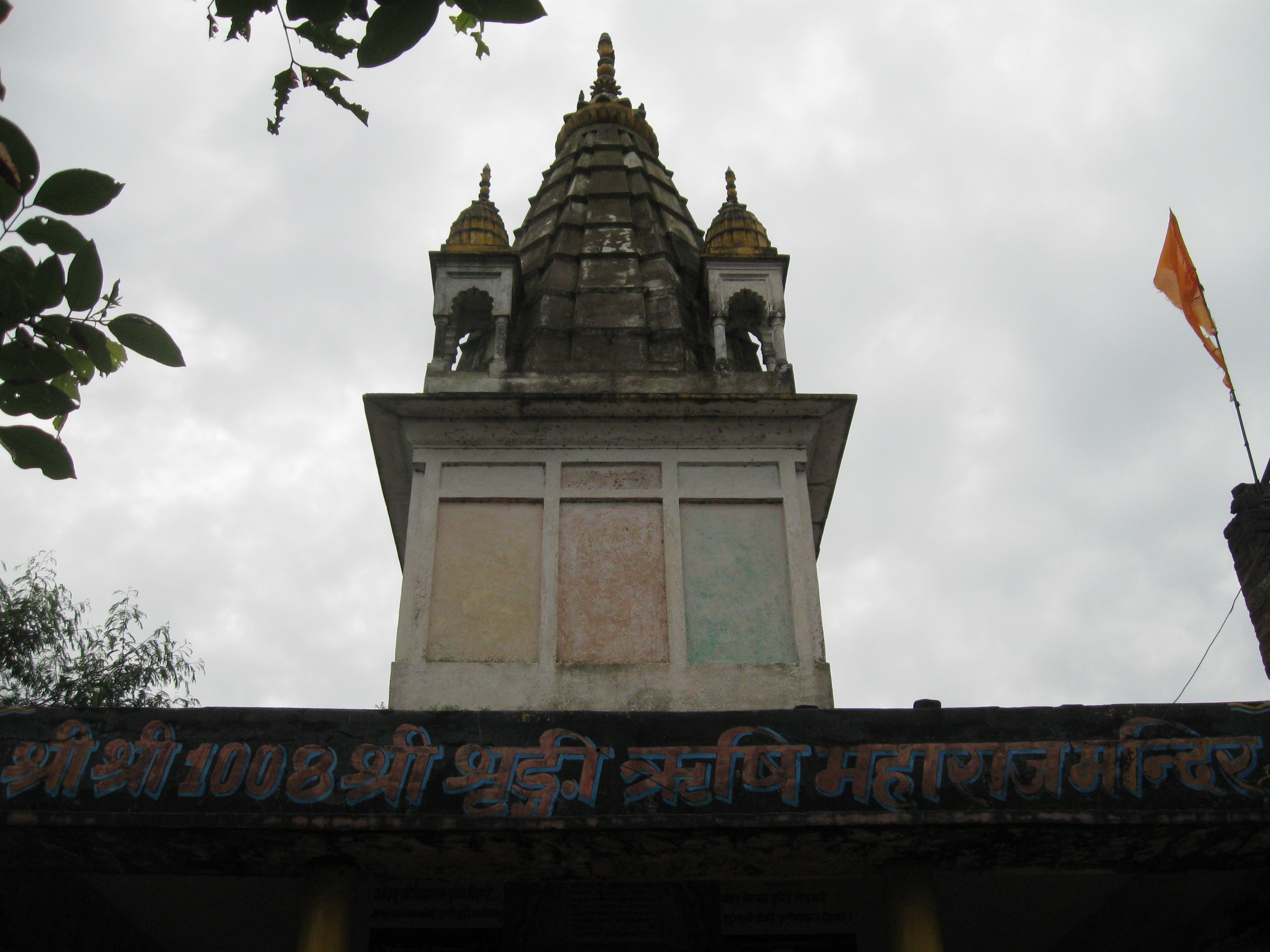
Close View of Baruasagar Temple

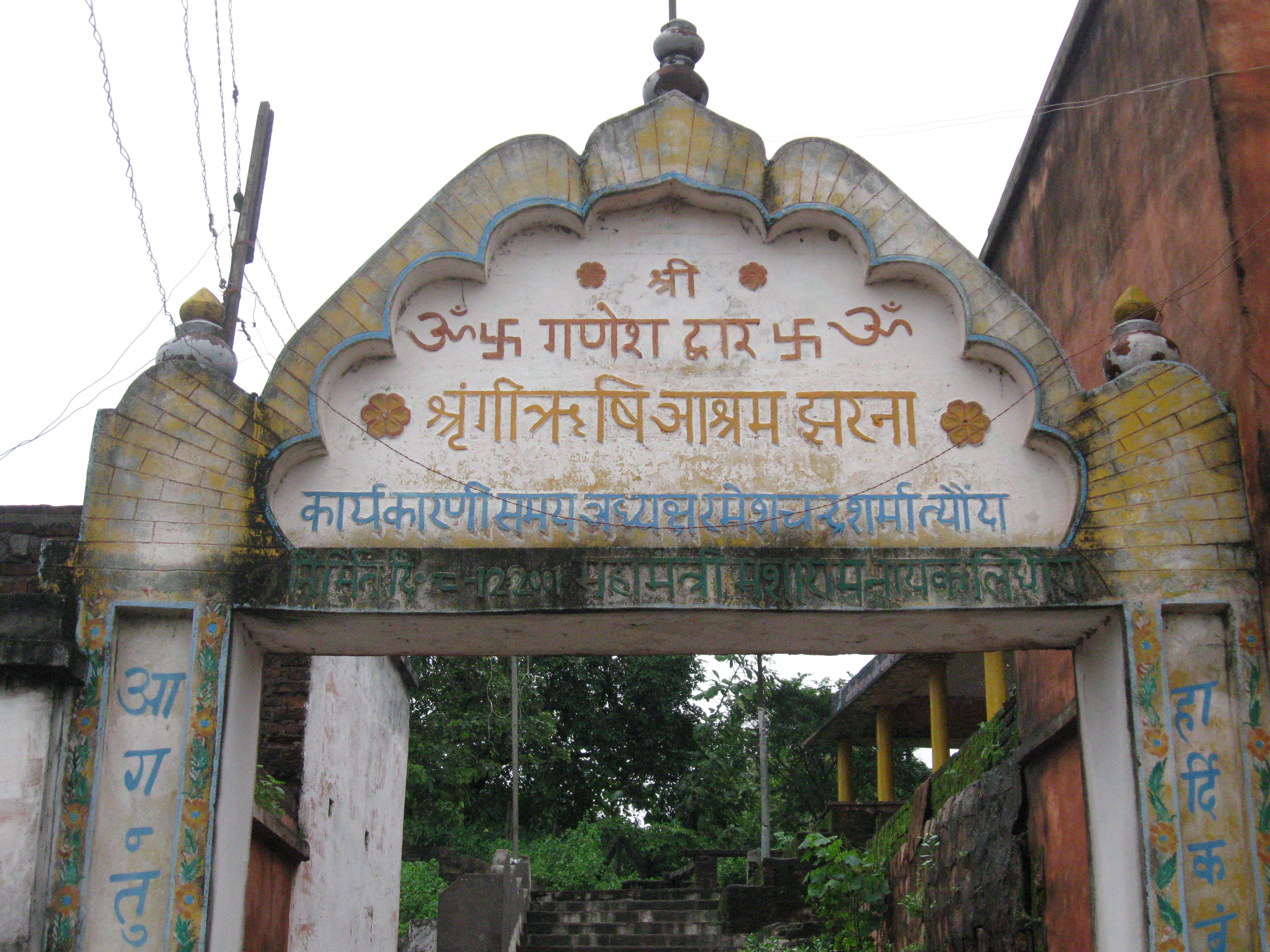
Entrance to the Baruasagar Temple

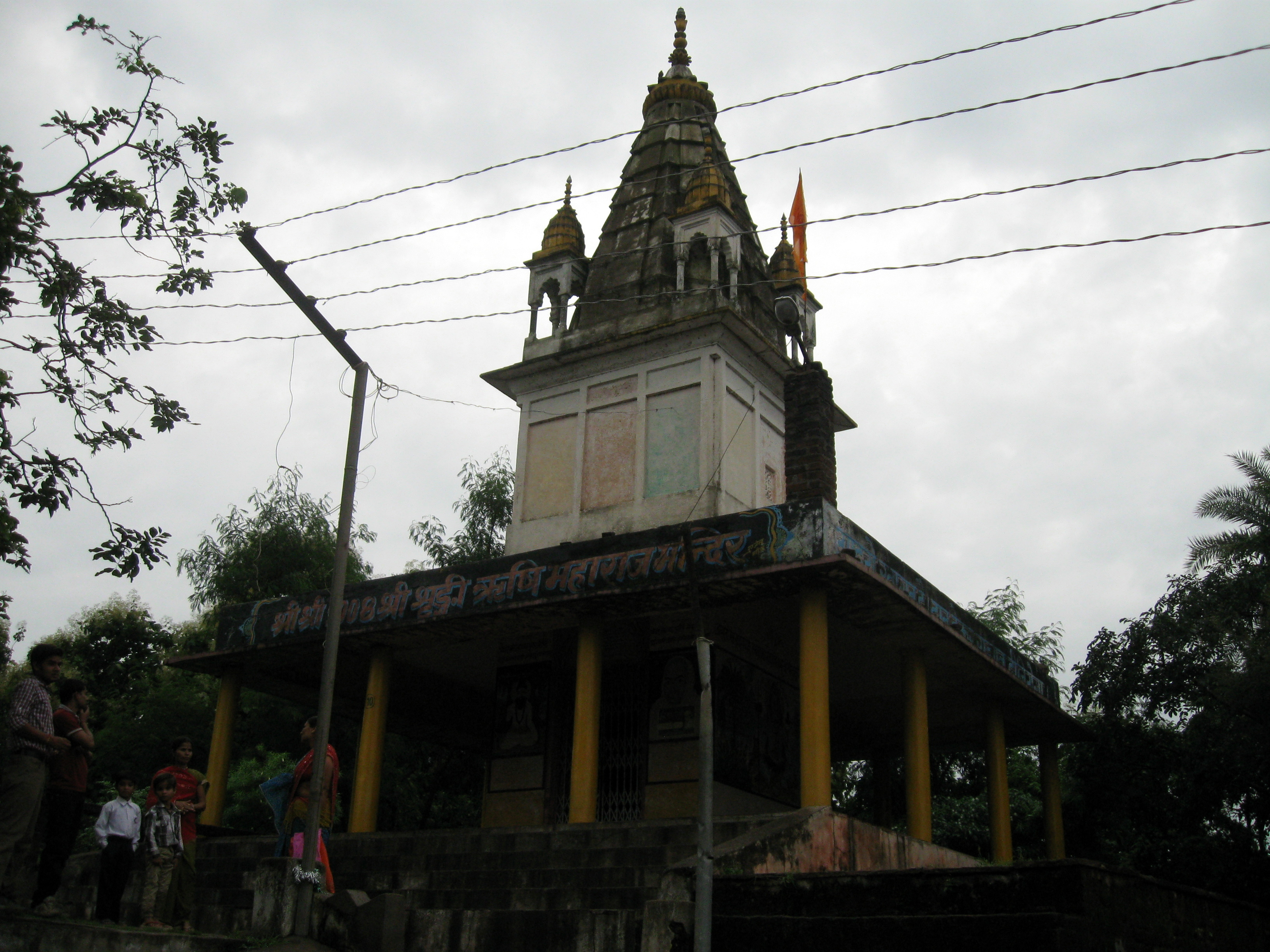
Wide view of Shringirishi Temple in Baruasagar

== See also ==
- List of lakes of Uttar Pradesh
- List of lakes in India
