= Kharela =

- Town
- Location in Uttar Pradesh, India
- Coordinates: 25.55°N 79.81°E
- Country: India
- State: Uttar Pradesh
- District: Mahoba
- Elevation: 145 m (476 ft)

Population (2001)
  - Total: 13,471

Languages
  - Official: Hindi
- Time zone: UTC+5:30 (IST)
- PIN: 210425
- Vehicle registration: UP-95

Kharela is a town and a nagar panchayat in Mahoba district in the Indian state of Uttar Pradesh.

== Demographics ==
As of 2001 India census, Kharela had a population of 13,471. Males constitute 55% of the population and females 45%. Kharela has an average literacy rate of 55%, lower than the national average of 74%: male literacy is 65%, and female literacy is 48%. 17% of the population is under 6 years of age.
