= Charkhari =

- City
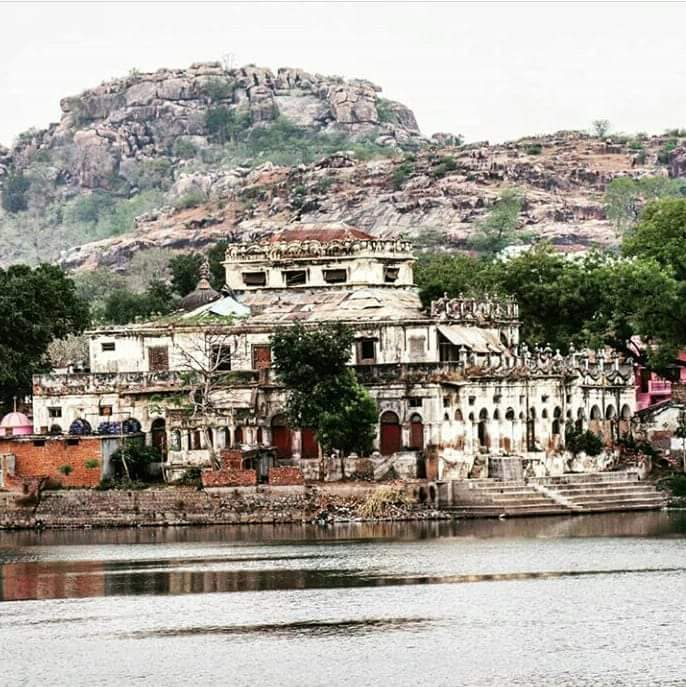
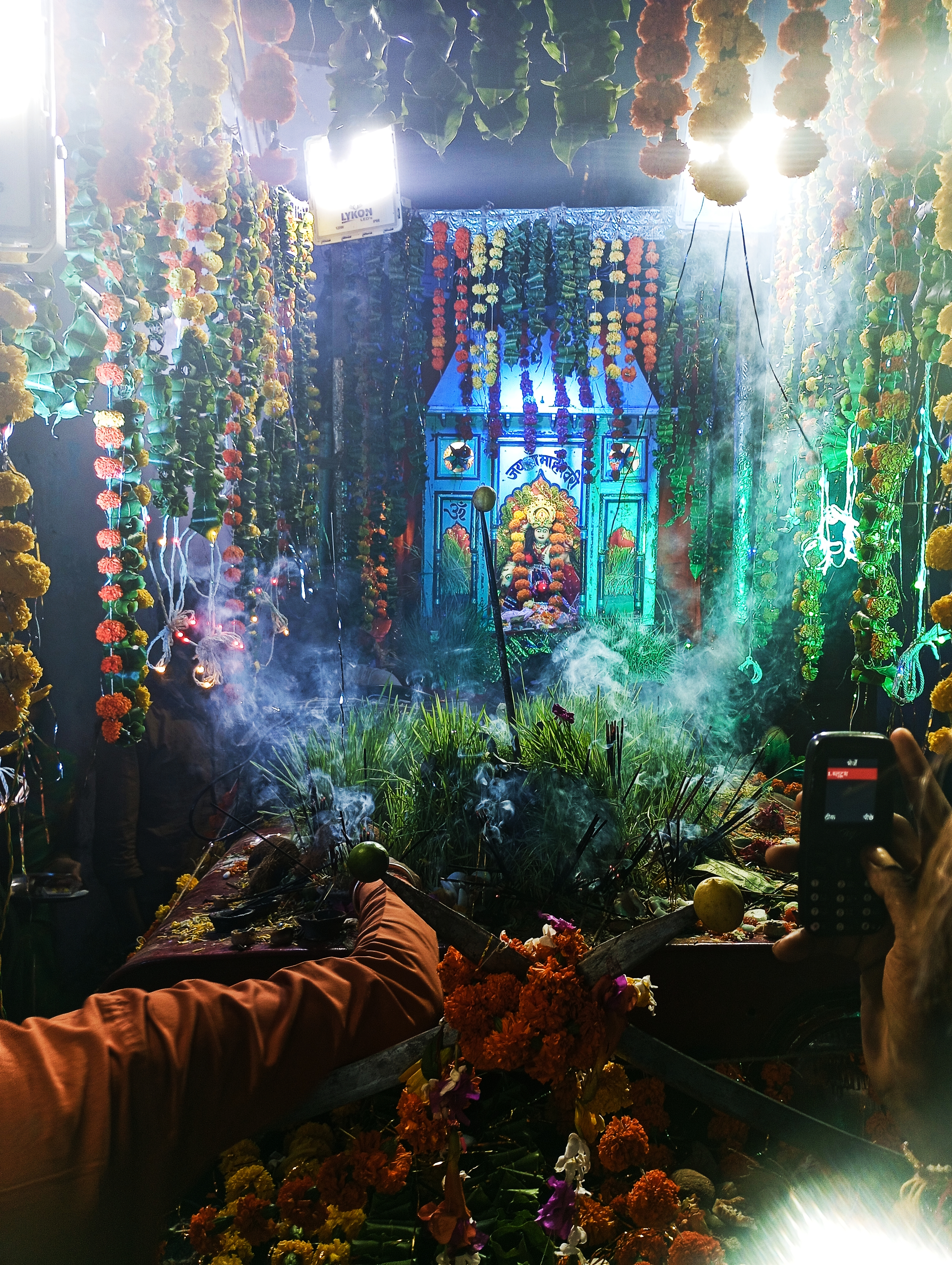
- Charkhari Fort, Maheshwari Mata Temple

- Location in Uttar Pradesh, India Charkhari (India)
- Coordinates: 25.4°N 79.75°E
- Country: India
- State: Uttar Pradesh
- District: Mahoba
- Elevation: 184 m (604 ft)

Population (2011)
  - Total: 27,760

Languages
  - Official: Hindi
- Time zone: UTC+5:30 (IST)
- PIN: 210421
- Vehicle registration: UP-95
- Website: up.gov.in

Charkhari is a city in Mahoba district in the state of Uttar Pradesh, India. It was the capital of the Charkhari concession. The state was founded in 1765 by Bijai Bahadur, a Rajput of Bundela clan. It is also the headquarters of Charkhari tehsil and the Legislative Assembly seat is also Charkhari.

== Geography ==
Charkhari is located at 25.4°N 79.75°E. It has an average elevation of 184 metres (603 feet). Charkhari is also known as the 'Kashmir of Bundelkhand'. The town is surrounded by many lakes. There are lakes named Vijay Sagar, Malkhan Sagar, Vanshi Sagar, Jai Sagar, Ratan Sagar and Kothi Tal.

== History ==
Charkhari State was one of the Princely states of India during the period of the British Raj. The state was founded in 1765 by Bijai Bahadur, a Rajput of Bundela clan. On India's independence, this Princely state was acceded to India.

== Demographics ==
As of 2011 India census, Charkhari had a population of 27,760. Males constitute 53% of the population and females 47%. Charkhari has an average literacy rate of 58%, lower than the national average of 59.5%; with male literacy of 68% and female literacy of 47%. 16% of the population is under 6 years of age.
