= Ashok Kumar Singh Chandel =

Indian politician (born 1954)

Member of the Uttar Pradesh Legislative Assembly
- In office 11 March 2017 – 19 April 2019
- Preceded by: Shivcharan Prajapati
- Succeeded by: Yuvraj Singh
- Constituency: Hamirpur
- In office 2007–2012
- Preceded by: Shivcharan Prajapati
- Succeeded by: Niranjan Jyoti
- Constituency: Hamirpur
- In office 1993–1996
- Preceded by: Shivcharan Prajapati
- Succeeded by: Shivcharan Prajapati
- Constituency: Hamirpur
- In office 1989–1991
- Preceded by: Jagdish Narain
- Succeeded by: Shivcharan Prajapati
- Constituency: Hamirpur

Member of Parliament, Lok Sabha
- In office 1999–2004
- Preceded by: Ganga Charan Rajput
- Succeeded by: Rajnarayan Budholiya
- Constituency: Hamirpur

Personal details
- Born: July 4, 1955 (age 71) Tikrauli, Hamirpur district, Uttar Pradesh
- Party: Bharatiya Janata Party
- Other political affiliations: Samajwadi Party; Bahujan Samaj Party; Janata Dal; Independent
- Spouse: Rajkumari Chandel
- Children: 3
- Education: B. A., L. L. B.

Ashok Kumar Singh Chandel (born 4 July 1954) is an Indian politician and a former member of Uttar Pradesh Legislative Assembly representing Hamirpur assembly constituency four times. He was also elected to Thirteenth Lok Sabha from Hamirpur parliamentary constituency as BSP candidate.

He was proven guilty in a case involving death of five citizens in 1997. The High court issued an order on April 19, 2019 where the politician was convicted of cold blooded homicide and was given life imprisonment along with eleven other conspirers.

On 19 April 2019, Allahabad High court sentenced him to life imprisonment for murdering five people in which one was eight years old child.
