= Manoj Kumar Prajapati =

Indian politician (born 1978)

Member of Uttar Pradesh Legislative Assembly
- Incumbent
- Assumed office March 2022
- Preceded by: Yuvraj Singh
- Constituency: Hamirpur Assembly constituency

Personal details
- Born: 3 July 1978 (age 47) Hamirpur, Uttar Pradesh
- Party: Bharatiya Janata Party
- Education: Doctor of Philosophy
- Alma mater: CSAUA&T
- Profession: Politician

Manoj Kumar Prajapati is an Indian professor, politician, and a member of the 18th Uttar Pradesh Assembly from the Hamirpur Assembly constituency of Hamirpur district. He is a member of the Bharatiya Janata Party.

== Early life ==
Prajapati was born on 3 July 1978 in Hamirpur, Uttar Pradesh, to a Hindu family of Shivcharan Prajapati. He married Prachi Chakraborty in 1985, and they have two children.

== Education ==
He completed his education with a Doctor of Agriculture at Chandra Shekhar Azad University of Agriculture and Technology, Kanpur, in 2005.
