= Rath, Uttar Pradesh =

Rath
- Town
- Location in Uttar Pradesh, India Rath (India)
- Coordinates: 25.58°N 79.57°E
- Country: India
- State: Uttar Pradesh
- Division: Chitrakoot
- District: Hamirpur

Government
  - Type: Municipal Council
  - Body: Rath Municipal Council
  - Municipal Chairperson: Srinivas Budhauliya (BJP)
  - Lok Sabha MP: Ajendra Singh Lodhi (SP)
  - MLA: Manisha Anuragi (BJP)
  - Sub-Divisional Magistrate: Rambhuan Tiwari

Population (2011)
  - Total: 65,056

Languages
  - Official: Hindi, English, Bundeli
- Time zone: UTC+5:30 (IST)
- PIN: 210431
- Telephone code: 05280
- Vehicle registration: UP-91

Rath is a town with a municipal board in Hamirpur district in the Indian state of Uttar Pradesh. Rath is a Tehsil of Hamirpur District. It is situated 506 km southeast of New Delhi.

== Geography ==
Rath is located at 25.58°N 79.57°E. It has an average elevation of 165 meters (541 feet) above sea level. It has a minimum temperature of 10 °C and a maximum of 47 °C.

== Demographics ==
As of the 2011 Census of India, Rath had a population of 65,056. Males constitute 54% of the people, and females 46%. Rath has an average literacy rate of 61%, higher than the national average of 59.5%: male literacy is 70%, and female literacy is 50%. In Rath, 15% of the population is under six years of age.

== Administration ==
=== Local self-government ===
Rath is governed by a municipality under the Uttar Pradesh Municipal Act. It has a 25-member council. The council is chaired by a chairperson who is directly elected by more than 35,000 electorates. The council is called Nagar Palika.

=== Sub district administration ===
Rath is the headquarters of the subdivision, which is headed by a Sub-Divisional Magistrate (S.D.M.). The same officer holds the court of City Magistrate of Rath. SDM is assisted by four officers, one Tehsil Magistrate and three Nayab Tehsil Magistrates. Tehsildar looks into the revenue matter of the whole of sub-district and is assisted by three nayabs who look after the three divisions of Rath, namely Majgawan, Amgaon, and Rath city.

=== Police administration ===
Rath DSP maintains rath city's security. An officer of the cadre of Deputy Superintendent of Police (C.O.) heads the Rath's police administration. Rath Kotwali is headed by Kotwal, an officer of Inspector cadre. Rath police circle consists of 2 police stations, namely:

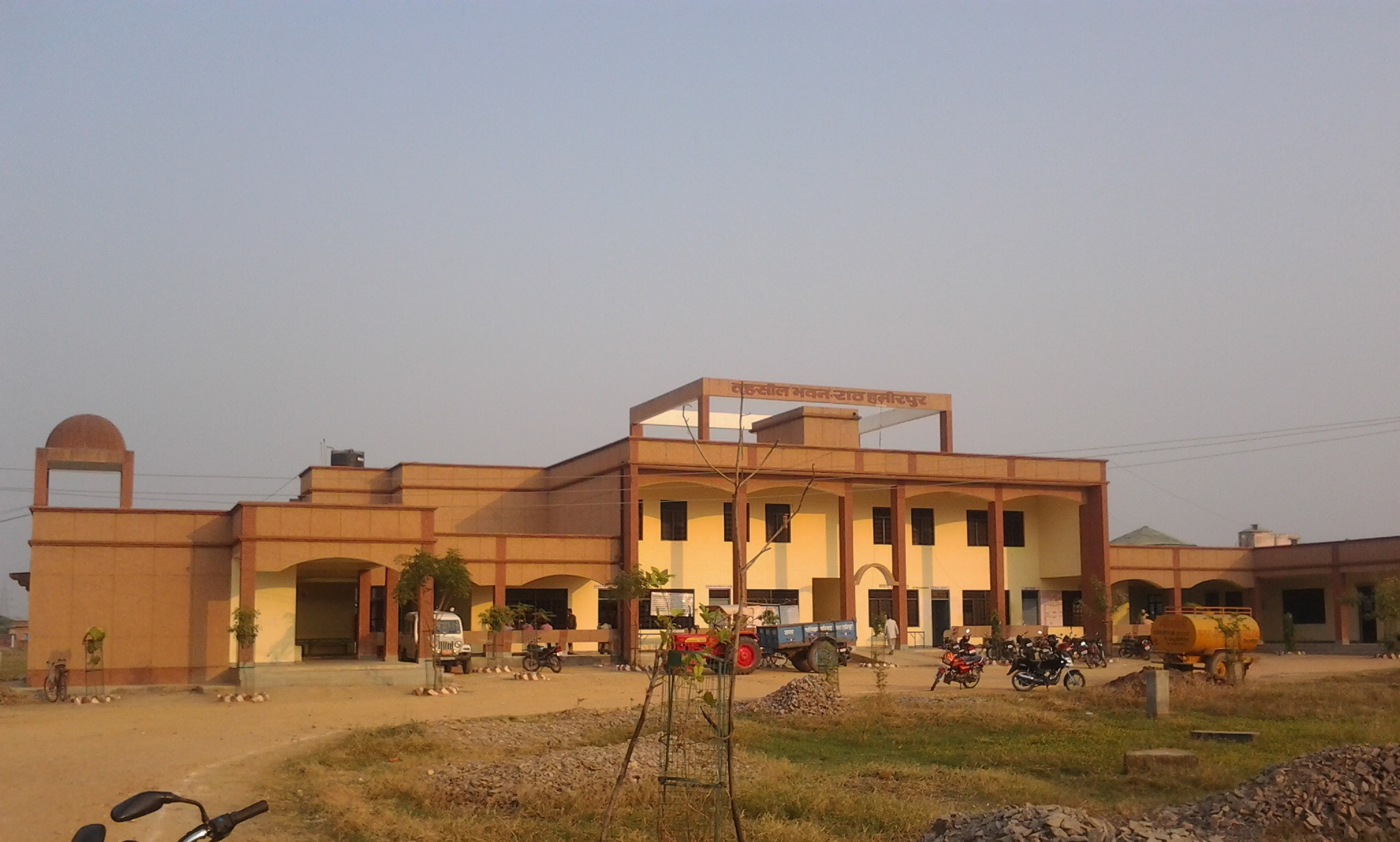
Tehsil Bhawan, Rath

- Rath City Kotwali
- Majhgawan Thana
- Hamirpur Chungi
- Ramlila Maidan
- Orai Road
- Kot Bazar
- Barakhamba
- Bajariya
- Chaupra Mandir
- Padav (BUS STAND)

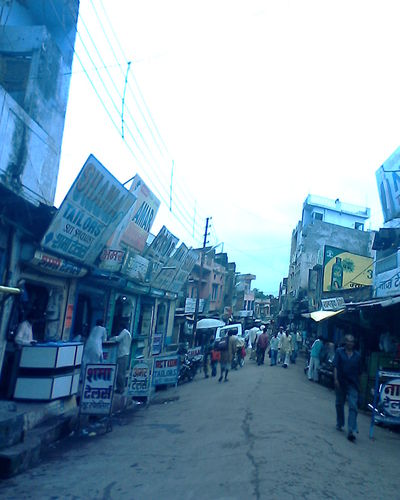
Kot Bazar, Rani road, Rath

== Transportation ==
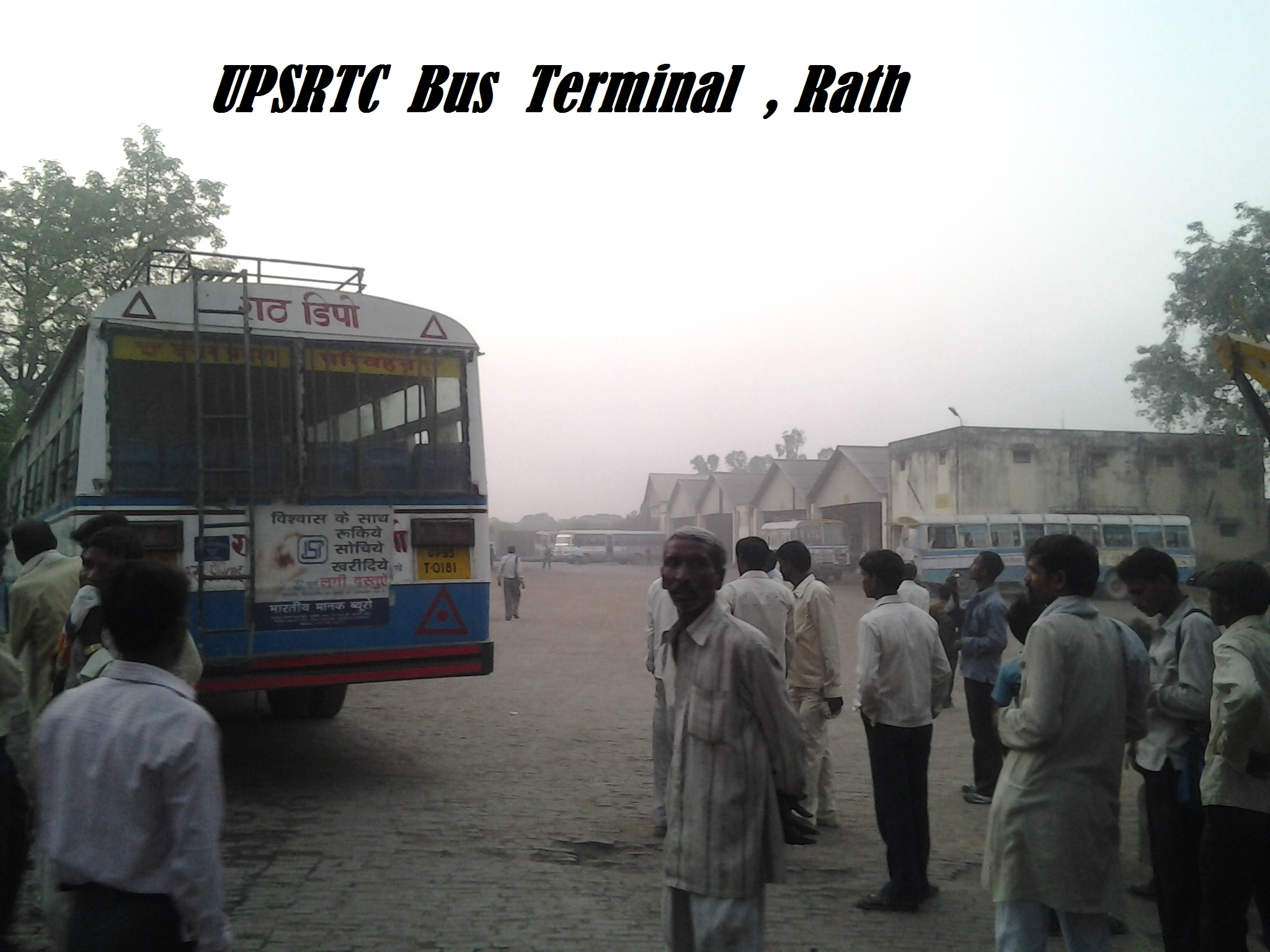
City Bus Terminal, Rath

=== Airways ===
Rath is served by the Khajuraho airport (110 km). Kanpur (145 km) and Lucknow (225 km) airports are nearby.

=== Roadways ===
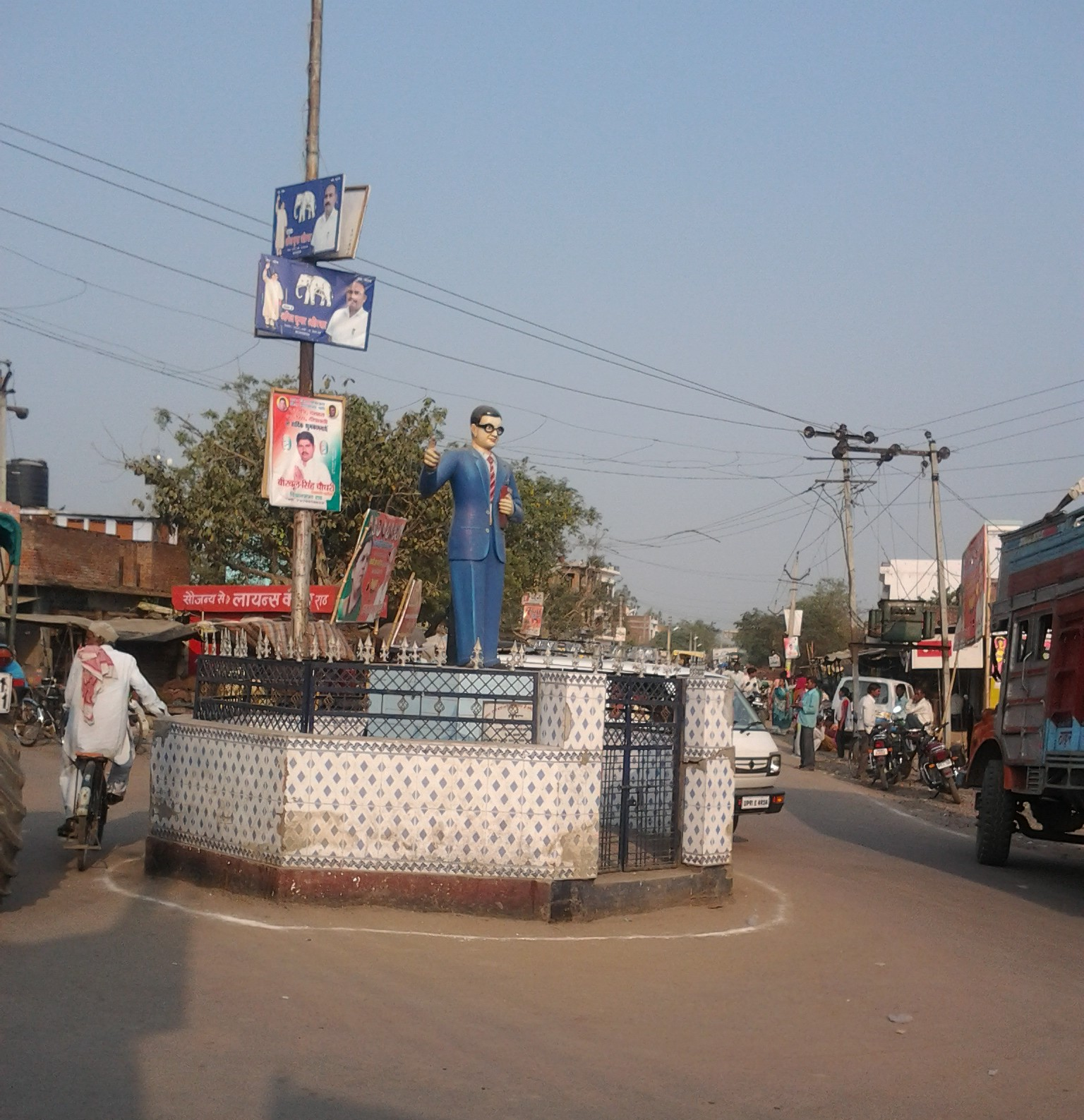
Busiest Chauraha (Intersection/Chowk) of city

Rath is connected with UPSH-21 (Bilaraya to Panwari) and UPSH-42 (Hamirpur to Jhansi). There are other roads like MDR-41B that link Rath to other parts of the state. UPSRTC and private bus services provide transportation to other cities. Rath has one Bus Terminal and other bus stands, including Orai, Charkhari bus stand (near Ramleela maidan), and Jalalpur Bus. Regular bus services are available to nearby towns like Mahoba, Banda, Maudaha, Orai, Chitrakoot, Hamirpur. Rath is also well connected with Allahabad, Varanasi, Kanpur, Lucknow, Delhi, Agra, Jhansi, Noida, Jaipur, Mathura, and Ajmer.

=== Railways ===
Rath is not directly linked with railways. The nearest railway stations are Halparpur which is 45 km away, and Kulpahar, which is 47 km away. Another nearby railway stations are Orai, at a distance of 55 km and Maudaha (Ragaul), at a distance of 61 km from Rath.

== Notable people ==
- Ramchandra Shukla, historian of Hindi literature.
- Yogesh Tripathi, Indian television actor.
