= Hamirpur, Uttar Pradesh Lok Sabha constituency =

Constituency of the Indian parliament in Uttar Pradesh

Coordinates: 25.95°N 80.15°E

Hamirpur UP-91
- Lok Sabha constituency
- Interactive Map Outlining Hamirpur Lok Sabha constituency

Constituency details
- Country: India
- Region: North India
- State: Uttar Pradesh
- Assembly constituencies: Hamirpur; Rath; Mahoba; Charkhari; Tindwari
- Established: 1952
- Reservation: None

Member of Parliament
- 18th Lok Sabha
- Incumbent Ajendra Singh Lodhi
- Party: Samajwadi Party
- Elected year: 2024

Hamirpur is a Lok Sabha parliamentary constituency in Uttar Pradesh.

== Assembly segments ==
Presently, Hamirpur Lok Sabha constituency comprises five Vidhan Sabha (legislative assembly) segments. These are:-

No	Name	District	Member	Party	2024 Lead
228	Hamirpur	Hamirpur	Manoj Prajapati	BJP	SP
229	Rath (SC)	Hamirpur	Manisha Anuragi	BJP	BJP
230	Mahoba	Mahoba	Rakesh Goswami	BJP	BJP
231	Charkhari	Mahoba	Brijbhushan Rajpoot	BJP	SP
232	Tindwari	Banda	Ramkesh Nishad	BJP	BJP

== Members of Parliament ==
Year	Member	Party
1952	Manoolal Dwivedi	Indian National Congress
1957	Manoolal Dwivedi	Indian National Congress
1962	Manoolal Dwivedi	Indian National Congress
1967	Swami Brahmanand	Indian National Congress
1971	Swami Brahmanand	Indian National Congress
1977	Tej Pratap Singh	Janata Party
1980	Doongar Singh	Indian National Congress
1984	Swami Prasad Singh	Indian National Congress
1989	Ganga Charan Rajput	Janata Dal
1991	Vishwanath Sharma	Bharatiya Janata Party
1996	Ganga Charan Rajput	Bharatiya Janata Party
1998	Ganga Charan Rajput	Bharatiya Janata Party
1999	Ashok Kumar Singh Chandel	Bahujan Samaj Party
2004	Rajnarayan Budholiya	Samajwadi Party
2009	Vijay Bahadur Singh	Bahujan Samaj Party
2014	Pushpendra Chandel	Bharatiya Janata Party
2019	Pushpendra Chandel	Bharatiya Janata Party
2024	Ajendra Singh Lodhi	Samajwadi Party

== Election results ==
=== 2024 ===
2024 Indian general elections: Hamirpur
Party	Candidate	Votes	%	±%
SP	Ajendra Singh Lodhi	490,683	44.00	▲44.00
BJP	Pushpendra Singh Chandel	4,88,054	43.76	▼9.01
BSP	Nirdosh Kumar Dixit	94,696	8.49	▼21.47
NOTA	None of the Above	13,453	1.21	N/A
Majority		2,629	0.24	▼22.58
Turnout		11,15,299	60.62	▼1.70
SP gain from BJP		Swing		

=== 2019 ===
2019 Indian general elections: Hamirpur
Party	Candidate	Votes	%	±%
BJP	Pushpendra Chandel	575,122	52.77	+6.36
BSP	Dilip Kumar Singh	3,26,470	29.96	+11.93
INC	Pritam Singh Lodhi (Kisaan)	1,14,534	10.51	+2.51
PSP(L)	Arvind Kumar Prajapati	4,247	0.39	+0.39
Independent	Sanjay Kumar Sahu	24,801	2.28	
Majority		2,48,652	22.82	
Turnout		10,90,029	62.32	
BJP hold		Swing		

=== 2014 ===
2014 Indian general elections: Hamirpur
Party	Candidate	Votes	%	±%
BJP	Pushpendra Chandel	453,884	46.41	+27.29
SP	Vishambhar Prasad Nishad	1,87,096	19.13	−3.74
BSP	Rakesh Kumar Goswami	1,76,356	18.03	−9.42
INC	Pritam Singh Lodhi (Kisaan)	78,229	8.00	−15.93
Independent	Vimlesh	23,137	2.37	+2.37
NOTA	None of the above	10,449	1.07	+1.07
Majority		2,66,788	27.28	+23.76
Turnout		9,77,930	56.27	+7.87
BJP gain from BSP		Swing		

== See also ==
- Hamirpur, Uttar Pradesh
- List of constituencies of the Lok Sabha
