= 2007 Uttar Pradesh Legislative Assembly election =

- 7 April 2007 – 8 May 2007

All 403 seats of the Uttar Pradesh Legislative Assembly 202 seats needed for a majority
- Turnout: 45.96% (▼7.84%)
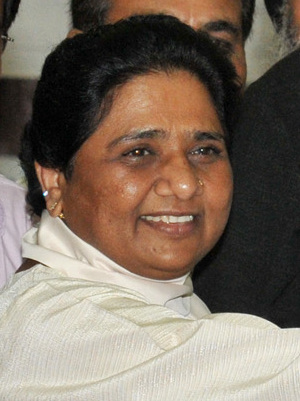

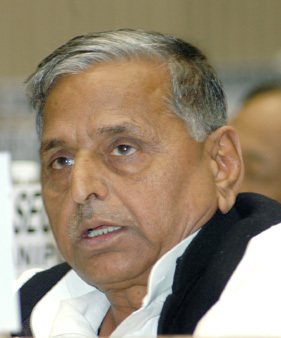

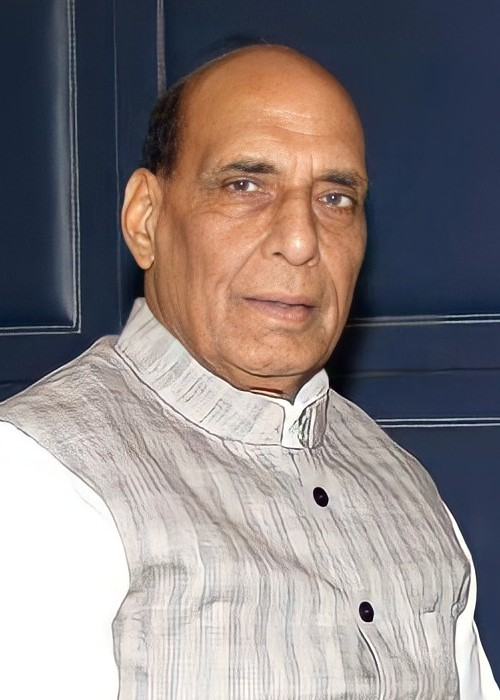

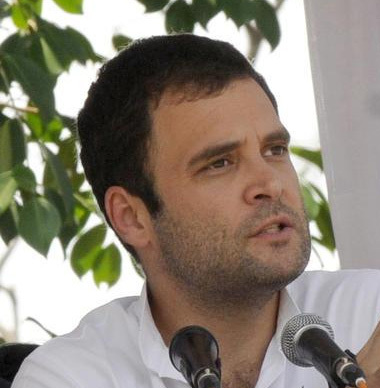
	Majority party	Minority party
Leader	Mayawati	Mulayam Singh Yadav
Party	BSP	SP
Alliance	-	-
Leader since	1995	1992
Leader's seat	MLC	Bharthana (vacated); Gunnaur (Retained)
Last election	98	143
Seats won	206	97
Seat change	▲108	▼46
Popular vote	15,872,561	13,267,674
Percentage	30.43%	25.43%
Swing	▲7.37%	▲0.06%
	Third party	Fourth party
Leader	Rajnath Singh	Rahul Gandhi
Party	BJP	INC
Alliance	NDA	UPA
Leader since	2005	2007
Leader's seat	Did not contest	Did not contest
Last election	88	25
Seats won	51	22
Seat change	▼37	▼3
Popular vote	8,851,199	4,489,234
Percentage	16.97%	8.61%
Swing	▼3.11%	▼0.35%
Chief Minister before election
Mulayam Singh Yadav
SP
Elected Chief Minister
Mayawati
BSP

The 2007 Uttar Pradesh legislative assembly election was held during April–May 2007. It was held to elect a government for the state of Uttar Pradesh in India. The votes were counted and results were declared on 11 May 2007. The election resulted with Bahujan Samaj Party getting an absolute majority in UP legislative assembly, and Mayawati becoming the Chief Minister of the state fourth time.

== Background ==
With 166 million people, U.P. is about the size of France, Germany, and the Benelux nations combined. There are 113 million voters, and 403 electoral seats, with an average of a quarter of a million voters in each constituency. The elections were conducted for 403 seats at 110,000 polling stations under very strict guidelines by the autonomous Election Commission of India. More than 46% of the electorate cast their votes.

== Schedule ==
Assembly elections in Uttar Pradesh were held between 7 April and 8 May 2007. The term of the outgoing government ended on 14 May 2007.

On 21 February 2007,Election Commission of India announced the election schedule to the Legislative Assembly of Uttar Pradesh.Elections was conducted in the State on the basis of the electoral rolls revised with reference to 01.01.07 as the qualifying date. The Electoral roll revision process in the State has been completed and the final publication was made on 15.1.07. As per final rolls, there were 11,43,44,243 electors in the State. The entire election is scheduled into 7 phases.

- Phase 1 : 2007-04-07
- Phase 2 : 2007-04-13
- Phase 3 : 2007-04-18
- Phase 4 : 2007-04-23
- Phase 5 : 2007-04-28
- Phase 6 : 2007-05-03
- Phase 7 : 2007-05-08

Poll event	Phase						
Poll event	I	II	III	IV	V	VI	VII
Notification date	13 March 2007	17 March 2007	23 March 2007	28 March 2007	3 April 2007	5 April 2007	13 April 2007
Last date for filing nomination	20 March 2007	24 March 2007	30 March 2007	4 April 2007	10 April 2007	12 April 2007	20 April 2007
Scrutiny of nomination	21 March 2007	26 March 2007	2 April 2007	5 April 2007	11 April 2007	13 April 2007	21 April 2007
Last date for withdrawal of nomination	23 March 2007	28 March 2007	4 April 2007	7 April 2007	13 April 2007	16 April 2007	23 April 2007
Date of poll	7 April 2007	13 April 2007	18 April 2007	23 April 2007	28 April 2007	3 May 2007	8 May 2007
Date of counting of votes	11 May 2007						

Phase
I (62 ACs, 13 Districts)	II (58 ACs, 10 Districts)	III (57 ACs, 10 Districts)	IV (57 ACs, 9 Districts)	V (58 ACs, 9 Districts)	VI (52 ACs, 9 Districts)	VII (59 ACs, 9 Districts)
Etawah; Auraiya; Kanpur Dehat; Kanpur Nagar; Jalaun; Jhansi; Lalitpur; Hamirpur; Mahoba; Firozabad; Etah; Mainpuri; Agra	Saharanpur; Muzaffarnagar; Meerut; Baghpat; Ghaziabad; Gautam Budh Nagar; Bulandshahr; Aligarh; Mathura; Hathras	Bijnor; Moradabad; Rampur; Amroha; Budaun; Bareilly; Shahjahanpur; Pilibhit; Farrukhabad; Kannauj	Sitapur; Barabanki; Lakhimpur Kheri; Balrampur; Siddharthnagar; Bahraich; Gonda; Basti; Sant Kabir Nagar	Hardoi; Unnao; Lucknow; Rae Bareli; Sultanpur; Banda; Fatehpur; Chitrakoot; Pratapgarh	Kaushambi; Allahabad; Jaunpur; Ghazipur; Chandauli; Varanasi; Bhadohi; Mirzapur; Sonbhadra	Ambedkar Nagar; Faizabad; Maharajganj; Gorakhpur; Kushinagar; Deoria; Ballia; Azamgarh; Mau

== Parties ==
A total of 129 parties fielded 2,487 candidates, while 2020 candidates stood as independents, for the total of 406 seats.

== Seat Allotment ==
=== Bahujan Samaj Party ===
Party	Flag	Symbol	Leader	Seats contested
Bahujan Samaj Party			Mayawati	403

=== National Democratic Alliance ===
Party	Flag	Symbol	Leader	Seats contested
Bharatiya Janata Party			Rajnath Singh	350
Apna Dal			Sonelal Patel	36+3
Janata Dal (United)			Sharad Yadav	16

=== Samajwadi Alliance ===
Party	Flag	Symbol	Leader	Seats contested
Samajwadi Party			Mulayam Singh Yadav	393
Akhil Bharatiya Loktantrik Congress			Naresh Chandra Agrawal	2

=== Indian National Congress ===
Party	Flag	Symbol	Leader	Seats contested
Indian National Congress			Rahul Gandhi	393

== Criminalisation in the U.P. 2007 elections ==
The number of criminal-politicians participating in the elections have been growing, particularly because they have been successful in the past. In the U.P. Assembly elections, 2002, candidates with criminal records won 206 out of 403 seats in the assembly, i.e. more criminals were elected than regular politicians.

In 2007, the participation by criminals increased significantly. Prior to elections, 74% more criminal politicians were given tickets by the mainstream parties (Source: UP Election Watch, independent NGO headed by ex-DIG Ishwar P. Dwivedi):

1. Bahujan Samaj Party (BSP): 36.27%
2. Samajwadi Party (SP): 27.01%
3. Bharatiya Janata Party (BJP): 23.05%
4. Indian National Congress (INC) : 21.60%

The Election Commission of India, the autonomous body charged with conducting elections, was facing intense media pressure to check criminalization related irregularities in the electoral process. Extremely strict measures were enforced, bringing in 639 companies of paramilitary forces to prevent musclepower effects. Any deviations from prescribed norms led to candidates being debarred. To help manage the situation, elections were held in seven stages.

At least six candidates campaigned from jails, broadcasting live speeches through illegal mobile phones smuggled into their jail cells while jailors looked the other way.

However, partially owing to the strict measures adopted during elections, only 100 persons with criminal records won the elections (as opposed to 206 in the previous elections). These include the elected Chief Minister Mayawati, who is facing embezzlement charges stemming from the Rs.175 crore (US$35 million) Taj Corridor Case, the leader of the opposition Mulayam Singh Yadav, and other ganglords and hardened criminals (see Criminal-Politicians below). In many of these instances, opposition campaigners did not feel safe enough to put up a vibrant campaign, and in some situations, the mainstream parties reached alliances with the criminals and did not put up serious competition (e.g., Mukhtar Ansari). However, to some extent, these victories may also reflect a perception that these criminal politicians are able to deliver some level of well-being to their communities.

For example, the Soraon Assembly constituency in Allahabad district is one where all 11 candidates in the fray had criminal cases pending against them. Here Mohd. Mustaba Siddiqi of the Bahujan Samaj Party (38280 votes, 29.41%) defeated Mohd. Ayub of the Samajwadi Party (32739/25.15%).

== Alleged and convicted criminal-politicians who won ==
=== Samajwadi Party ===
- Mukhtar Ansari, (Independent, supported by Samajwadi Party): won as (Independent) from Mau, while he was in Jhansi jail, facing charges in the murder of BJP ganglord-MLA from Ghazipur, Krishnanand Rai. His brother Afzal Ansari became the Lok Sabha MP from Ghazipur, after Krishnanand Rai was killed, and is also in jail for the murder, which was apparently executed by the Munna Bajrangi gang which is known to be close to the Ansari's. Mukhtar is named in 29 criminal cases (the third highest in these elections), but is close to Mulayam Singh Yadav, and the Samajwadi Party did not put up a candidate against him. He also is said to be close to Sonia Gandhi's Indian National Congress party, who put up only a dummy candidate, Gopal, against him; Gopal garnered only three thousand votes and lost his deposit. A large faction of the Mau Congress executive committee members had resigned en masse to protest against choosing such a dummy candidate.

Despite Mukhtar's muscle power however, the Bahujan Samaj Party (BSP) candidate Vijay Pratap managed to garner 42% of the vote, and Mukhtar won by seven thousand votes (47%) only Currently lodged at Gorakhpur Jail, where his case might take a long time to come to trial. He won the Lakshmipur Constituency seat in Gorakhpur District by a margin of nearly 20 thousand votes (12%).

- Raghuraj Pratap Singh (Independent, supported by Samajwadi Party/Bharatiya Janata Party): alias Raja Bhaiyya, with 35 criminal cases filed against him. Raja Bhaiyya is from the princely family of Kunda. A skull found in a palace pond allegedly belongs to scooterist Santosh Misra who was guilty of daring to overtake his convoy. He won as an independent from Kunda with an overwhelming margin of 53,000 votes (48%) over Shiv Prakash Mishra of the BSP.
- Mukhtar Ansari's eldest brother Sibakatullah Ansari (Samajwadi Party): won from Mohammadabad, which used to be the constituency for the slain BJP MLA Krishnanand Rai. Shibakatullah defeated Krishnanand's wife Alka Rai (BJP), who was standing on a platform of seeking justice for the murder of her husband, apparently by the Ansari's
- Chandrabhadra Singh alias Sonu (Samajwadi Party), from Issauli in Sultanpur district, is accused, along with seven others, in the murder of the gangster-Saint Gyaneshwar in Allahabad. After Mayawati's accession to power, Chandrabhadra was arrested as one of her first directives

=== Bahujan Samaj Party ===
- Badshah Singh (BSP): Don from Maudaha, is facing six criminal charges, including attempted murder, extortion, and kidnapping. Won at Maudaha by defeating Apni Chiraiya Prajapati of the Samajwadi Party by a margin of 17 thousand votes (15%). Currently a Minister of State in the Mayawati cabinet.
- Anand Sen Yadav, (BSP): Son of BSP gangster Member of Parliament Mitra Sen Yadav (currently being investigated in the human trafficking scam along with Babulal Katara). Anand, who is in Jail facing over 12 cases including murder and extortion, won from Milkipur, and has been appointed Minister of State in the Mayawati cabinet.
- Daddan or Daddan Misra (BSP), from Bhinga. According to his election affidavit, Daddan has cases registered under IPC 147, 148, 199, 448, 453, 323, 427, 511;
- Jamuna Nishad from Pipraich (cabinet minister, resigned on 2008-06-08 after being named in the murder of a policeman.)
- Avadhpal Singh Yadav (BSP), won from Aliganj and is currently Minister of State.
- Jayant Kumar Singh (BSP) from Phephna, Vidhan Sabha Ballia (cabinet minister).
- Shazil Islam Ansari (BSP): won from Bhojipura, and appointed a minister of state in Maya cabinet.

Out of 19 ministers of state in the Mayawati cabinet, eight have violent criminal charges pending against them.

=== Rashtriya Parivartan Dal ===
- D. P. Yadav, mafia don and erstwhile liquor baron from Western U.P. (Rashtriya Parivartan Dal): Scraped through from Sahaswan, with a 109-vote margin (0.1%) over the Samajwadi Party incumbent Omkar Singh
- D. P. Yadav's wife Umlesh Yadav (Rashtriya Parivartan Dal) won more handily from Bisauli, defeating incumbent Samajwadi Party legislator Yogendra Singh Kunnu with a margin of 13,400 votes (10%).

== Alleged and convicted criminal-politicians who lost ==
=== Rashtriya Lok Dal ===
- Chhotelal Vishwakarma of Rashtriya Lok Dal, with 24 cases against him, lost from Gangapur in Varanasi District. He polled only two thousand votes and lost his deposit. Surendra Singh Patel of the Samajwadi Party won from this constituency with a lead of ten thousand votes (6%) over Neel Ratan Patel of Apna Dal.

=== Apna Dal/Bharatiya Janata Party ===
- Pawan Pandey (Apna Dal, supported by Bharatiya Janata Party), who has 63 criminal cases pending against him (the highest number of cases pending against any candidate in this election) lost in Akbarpur, trailing the winner Ram Achal Rajbhar of Bahujan Samaj Party (BSP) by nearly twelve thousand votes (13%).
- Abhay Singh, a criminal-politician in jail charged with several murder cases against him, fielded his wife Sarita Singh on Apna Dal ticket from Bikapur seat in Faizabad district. At one point, he conducted a meeting with the sector-in-charge inside the jail. Abhay Singh has also been accused of making threatening calls to voters from inside the Faizabad jail. While Sarita Singh polled forty thousand votes, she came third, trailing the winner Jitendra Kumar Bablu Bhaiya (BSP) by 13 thousand votes (8%).

A number of other criminal politicians mentioned in the press, such as the new bandit queen Seema Parihar, wife of the slain dacoit Nirbhay Gujjar, do not appear on the candidate lists, and may have been removed due to irregularities in their nomination papers or otherwise.

== Election result ==
Exit polls suggested that the Bahujan Samaj Party may emerge as the largest party with between 110 and 160 seats; however, it far outstripped this prediction collecting an absolute majority of 206 seats out of a total 403 in the assembly. In contrast, Samajwadi Party, Bharatiya Janata Party and the Indian National Congress were reduced significantly.significantly.

=== Defections ===
The BSP had won 98 seats in the last elections, but 33 MLAs defected to the Samajwadi Party in 2003, in a move that may have been illegal but was permitted by the then speaker Kesri Nath Tripathi.

=== Blanked out ===
In addition, 116 parties fielded candidates but failed to win a seat. The parties with more than 50 candidates fielded without outcome are:

- Indian Justice Party (121)
- Suheldev Bhartiya Samaj Party (97)
- Lok Dal (76)
- National Lokhind Party (74)
- Lok Jan Shakti Party (72)
- Rashtriya Janata Dal (66)
- Shiv Sena (59)

However, it is likely that some of these parties may have taken away votes from other groups; e.g., Udit Raj's Indian Justice Party has a good standing among Dalits who also constitute an important chunk of the BSP vote bank.

=== Rainbow coalition ===
A characteristic of the BSP win was the amalgamation of Brahmin votes into the Dalit dominated party, an approach that has been called the rainbow coalition. This is in contrast to the decades-old trend of exploiting deep-rooted caste divisions in the state between Dalits, Upper Castes, Muslims and different OBC groups, which tend to vote in blocks.

=== Results by party ===
The results by party are as follows:

Vote Share by party
1. BSP (30.4%)
2. SP (25.4%)
3. BJP (17.0%)
4. INC (8.61%)
5. Other (18.6%)
Seat Share
1. BSP (51.1%)
2. SP (24.1%)
3. BJP (12.7%)
4. INC (5.46%)
5. RLD (2.48%)
6. Other (4.22%)

Party	Popular vote			Seats		
Party	Vote	%	+/-	Contested	Won	+/-
Bahujan Samaj Party	15,872,561	30.43	▲7.37	403	206	▲108
Samajwadi Party	13,267,674	24.43	▼0.06	393	97	▼46
Bharatiya Janata Party	8,851,199	16.97	▼3.11	350	51	▼37
Indian National Congress	4,489,234	8.61	▼0.35	393	22	▼3
Rashtriya Lok Dal	1,930,605	3.7	▲1.48	254	10	▼4
Rashtriya Parivartan Dal				14	2	▲1
Akhil Bharatiya Loktantrik Congress				2	1	▼1
Janata Dal (United)				16	1	▼1
UP United Democratic Front				54	1	▲1
Jan Kranti Party				66	1	▼3
Jan Morcha				118	1	▲1
Rashtriya Swabhimaan Party				122	0	Steady
Independent				2581	9	▼7
Total	5,21,63,417	100%	—	6086	403	—

=== Results by district ===
District	Seats					
District	Seats	SP	BSP	BJP	INC	OTH
Moradabad Division
Bijnor	7	—N/a	7	—N/a	—N/a	—N/a
Amroha	3	1	1	1	—N/a	—N/a
Moradabad	9	3	5	1	—N/a	—N/a
Rampur	4	2	—N/a	1	1	—N/a
Bareilly Division
Budaun	8	1	3	1	—N/a	3
Bareilly	9	3	4	2	—N/a	—N/a
Pilibhit	4	1	2	1	—N/a	—N/a
Shahjahanpur	6	2	3	1	—N/a	—N/a
Lucknow Division
Lakhimpur Kheri	7	4	2	1	—N/a	—N/a
Sitapur	9	5	4	—N/a	—N/a	—N/a
Hardoi	9	1	8	—N/a	—N/a	—N/a
Unnao	7	5	2	—N/a	—N/a	—N/a
Lucknow	8	1	2	4	—N/a	1
Raebareli	7	1	—N/a	—N/a	5	1
Ayodhya Division
Sultanpur	8	2	4	—N/a	2	—N/a
Barabanki	8	3	5	—N/a	—N/a	—N/a
Ayodhya	4	1	2	1	—N/a	—N/a
Ambedkar Nagar	5	—N/a	5	—N/a	—N/a	—N/a
Devipatan Division
Bahraich	8	2	5	1	—N/a	—N/a
Balrampur	4	—N/a	2	2	—N/a	—N/a
Gonda	7	4	2	—N/a	1	—N/a
Basti Division
Siddharthnagar	5	2	1	—N/a	2	—N/a
Basti	5	1	4	—N/a	—N/a	—N/a
Sant Kabir Nagar	4	2	2	—N/a	—N/a	—N/a
Gorakhpur Division
Maharajganj	6	3	1	2	—N/a	—N/a
Gorakhpur	9	1	4	2	1	1
Kushinagar	6	2	—N/a	3	1	—N/a
Deoria	7	4	3	—N/a	—N/a	—N/a
Azamgarh Division
Azamgarh	10	4	6	—N/a	—N/a	—N/a
Mau	4	—N/a	3	—N/a	—N/a	1
Ballia	8	2	6	—N/a	—N/a	—N/a
Varanasi Division
Jaunpur	10	3	5	1	—N/a	1
Ghazipur	7	2	5	—N/a	—N/a	—N/a
Chandauli	4	1	3	—N/a	—N/a	—N/a
Varanasi	7	2	2	3	—N/a	—N/a
Mirzapur Division
Bhadohi	3	1	2	—N/a	—N/a	—N/a
Mirzapur	5	1	3	1	—N/a	—N/a
Sonbhadra	2	—N/a	2	—N/a	—N/a	—N/a
Prayagraj Division
Fatehpur	6	—N/a	4	2	—N/a	—N/a
Pratapgarh	7	—N/a	3	1	1	2
Kaushambi	3	—N/a	3	—N/a	—N/a	—N/a
Prayagraj	11	1	8	1	1	—N/a
Kanpur Division
Farrukhabad	4	2	2	—N/a	—N/a	—N/a
Kannauj	3	2	1	—N/a	—N/a	—N/a
Etawah	4	3	1	—N/a	—N/a	—N/a
Auraiya	3	1	2	—N/a	—N/a	—N/a
Kanpur Dehat	4	1	3	—N/a	—N/a	—N/a
Kanpur Nagar	10	2	3	3	2	—N/a
Chitrakoot Division
Hamirpur	3	1	2	—N/a	—N/a	—N/a
Mahoba	2	—N/a	2	—N/a	—N/a	—N/a
Banda	4	2	1	1	—N/a	—N/a
Chitrakoot	2	—N/a	2	—N/a	—N/a	—N/a
Jhansi Division
Jalaun	4	—N/a	3	—N/a	1	—N/a
Jhansi	4	1	2	—N/a	1	—N/a
Lalitpur	2	—N/a	2	—N/a	—N/a	—N/a
Agra Division
Mathura	5	—N/a	2	—N/a	1	2
Agra	9	—N/a	6	2	—N/a	1
Firozabad	4	—N/a	2	—N/a	—N/a	2
Mainpuri	5	3	1	1	—N/a	—N/a
Aligarh	7	1	2	2	—N/a	2
Etah	8	2	4	2	—N/a	—N/a
Hathras	4	—N/a	2	1	—N/a	1
Meerut Division
Meerut	7	1	4	1	—N/a	1
Baghpat	4	—N/a	—N/a	—N/a	—N/a	4
Ghaziabad	5	1	2	1	—N/a	1
G. B. Nagar	2	—N/a	3	—N/a	—N/a	—N/a
Bulandshahr	8	—N/a	6	2	—N/a	—N/a
Saharanpur Division
Saharanpur	7	—N/a	5	1	—N/a	1
Muzaffarnagar	9	—N/a	4	2	1	2
Total	403	97	206	51	22	26

=== Results by Constituencies ===
This is the list of winners consolidated from the Election Commission of India party-wise results pages (ECI website).

Constituency		Winner				Runner Up				Margin	%
#	Name	Candidate	Party	Votes	%	Candidate	Party	Votes	%	Margin	%
Bijnor District
1	Seohara	Yash Pal Singh	BSP	47,751	31.41	Qutubddin	SP	32,873	21.62	14,878	9.79
2	Dhampur	Ashok Kumar Rana	BSP	65,717	40.80	Mool Chand Chauhan	SP	45,191	28.06	20,526	12.74
3	Afzalgarh	Muhammad Gazi	BSP	59,496	35.27	Indra Dev Singh	BJP	51,066	30.27	8,430	5.00
4	Nagina(SC)	Omvati Devi	BSP	46,551	32.86	Manoj Kumar Paras	SP	36,764	25.95	9,787	6.91
5	Nazibabad (SC)	Sheesharam Singh	BSP	49,848	38.97	Raj Kumar	CPI(M)	41,860	32.72	7,988	6.25
6	Bijnor	Shahnawaz Rana	BSP	61,588	37.17	Kuvar Bharatendra	BJP	61,031	36.84	557	0.33
7	Chandpur	Iqbal	BSP	58,808	35.91	Ram Avtar Singh	BJP	28,797	17.58	30,011	18.33
Amroha District
8	Amroha	Mehboob Ali	SP	42,115	31.29	Mangal Singh	BJP	41,437	30.79	678	0.50
9	Hasanpur	Ferhat Hasan	BSP	50,138	31.02	Devendra Nagpal	IND	46,631	28.85	3,507	2.17
10	Gangeshwari (SC)	Harpal Singh	BJP	43,142	33.72	Jagram Singh	SP	35,399	27.67	7,743	6.05
Moradabad District
11	Kanth	Rizwan Ahmad Khan	BSP	37,945	28.33	Abhinay Chaudhary	RLD	21,817	16.29	16,128	12.04
12	Sambhal	Iqbal Mehmood	SP	46,096	33.45	Rajesh Singhal	BJP	34,436	24.99	11,660	8.46
13	Bahjoi	Aqeel-ur-rahman Khan	BSP	41,040	31.89	Bharat Singh Yadav	BJP	40,131	31.18	909	0.71
14	Chandausi (SC)	Girish Chandra	BSP	40,335	36.19	Satish Premi	SP	33,053	29.66	7,282	6.53
15	Kunderki	Akbar Husain	BSP	50,626	33.86	Mohammad Rizwan	SP	41,356	27.66	9,270	6.20
16	Moradabad West	Rajeev Channa	BJP	39,705	27.12	Mohd. Aqil	BSP	34,116	23.30	5,589	3.82
17	Moradabad Nagar	Sandeep Agrawal	SP	49,547	60.71	Vikas Jain	BJP	20,368	24.96	29,179	35.75
18	Moradabad Rural	Usmanul Haq	SP	49,194	29.09	Ramveer Singh	BJP	46,034	27.22	3,160	1.87
19	Thakurdwara	Vijay Kumar Yadav	BSP	62,394	37.03	Kuwar Sarvesh Singh	BJP	53,284	31.62	9,110	5.41
Rampur District
20	Suar Tanda	Nawab Kazim Ali	SP	61,227	37.69	Shiv Bahadur Saxena	BJP	46,621	28.70	14,606	8.99
21	Rampur	Mohd. Azam Khan	SP	53,091	55.54	Afroz Ali Khan	INC	19,719	20.63	33,372	34.91
22	Bilaspur	Sanjay Kapoor	INC	35,040	20.84	Jwala Prasad	BJP	34,318	20.41	722	0.43
23	Shahabad (SC)	Kashi Ram	BJP	35,793	28.49	Radhey Shayam	SP	30,852	24.56	4,941	3.93
Budaun District
24	Bisauli	Umlesh Yadav	RPD	51,116	38.68	Yogendra Kumar Kunnu	SP	37,808	28.61	13,308	10.07
25	Gunnaur	Mulayam Singh Yadav	SP	54,696	60.56	Arif Ali	BSP	23,049	25.52	31,647	35.04
26	Sahaswan	Dhram Pal Yadav	RPD	33,883	29.54	Omkar Singh	SP	33,774	29.44	109	0.10
27	Bilsi (SC)	Yogendra Sagar	BSP	44,876	41.14	Ashutosh Maurya	SP	39,073	35.82	5,803	5.32
28	Budaun	Mahesh Chandra	BJP	36,403	31.78	Vimal Krishan Agrawal	SP	29,205	25.50	7,198	6.28
29	Usehat	Muslim Khan	BSP	46,739	35.14	Bhagwan Singh Shakya	JD(U)	41,297	31.05	5,442	4.09
30	Binawar	Ram Sevak Singh	BJSH	34,856	27.81	Umesh Singh Rathore	BSP	33,508	26.74	1,348	1.07
31	Dataganj	Sinod Kumar Shakya	BSP	36,612	32.73	Shailesh Pathak	INC	23,680	21.17	12,932	11.56
Bareilly District
32	Aonla	Radha Krishna	BSP	40,129	30.64	Bulaki Ram	SP	30,750	23.48	9,379	7.16
33	Sunha	Dharmendra Kumar	SP	29,707	24.61	Maiku Lal Maurya	BSP	26,575	22.01	3,132	2.60
34	Faridpur (SC)	Vijay Pal Singh	BSP	39,371	35.42	Siaram Sagar	SP	30,890	27.79	8,481	7.63
35	Bareilly Cantonment	Virendra Singh	BSP	31,353	25.23	Praveen Singh Aron	INC	25,592	20.59	5,761	4.64
36	Bareilly City	Rajesh Agarwal	BJP	26,893	31.52	Dr. Anil Sharma	INC	16,464	19.30	10,429	12.22
37	Nawabganj	Bhagwat Saran Gangwar	SP	40,654	27.74	Kesar Singh	BSP	36,506	24.91	4,148	2.83
38	Bhojipura	Shazil Islam Ansari	BSP	39,339	27.42	Bahoran Lal Maurya	BJP	38,209	26.63	1,130	0.79
39	Kawar	Sultan Beg	SP	54,245	36.49	Dr. D.C. Verma	BSP	42,719	28.73	11,526	7.76
40	Baheri	Chhatra Pal Singh	BJP	53,194	31.32	Anjum Rasheed	BSP	44,932	26.46	8,262	4.86
Pilibhit District
41	Pilibhit	Riaz Ahmad	SP	50,947	37.70	B.K. Gupta	BJP	46,912	34.72	4,035	2.98
42	Barkhera (SC)	Sukh Lal	BJP	55,220	43.46	Peetam Ram	SP	41,831	32.92	13,389	10.54
43	Bisalpur	Anis Ahmad Khan	BSP	45,689	32.00	Ram Saran Verma	BJP	40,753	28.54	4,936	3.46
44	Puranpur	Arshad Khan	BSP	48,193	28.34	V.M. Singh	INC	41,926	24.65	6,267	3.69
Shahjahanpur District
45	Powayan (SC)	Mithlesh	SP	48,552	31.96	Ram Saran Sagar	BSP	37,825	24.90	10,727	7.06
46	Nigohi	Roshan Lal	BSP	58,821	47.93	Kovid Kumar	SP	36,021	29.35	22,800	18.58
47	Tilhar	Rajesh Yadav	SP	43,708	35.46	Rajeev Kashyap	BSP	30,286	24.57	13,422	10.89
48	Jalalabad	Neeraj Kushwaha	BSP	40,397	30.14	Ram Murti Singh Verma	SP	36,738	27.41	3,659	2.73
49	Dadraul	Avadhesh Kumar Verma	BSP	43,425	35.67	Anwar Ali	SP	37,599	30.89	5,826	4.78
50	Shahjahanpur	Suresh Kumar Khanna	BJP	51,463	41.66	Faizan Ali Khan	BSP	41,273	33.41	10,190	8.25
Lakhimpur Kheri District
51	Mohamdi (SC)	Krishna Raj	BJP	53,391	38.02	Banshidhar Raj	SP	45,471	32.38	7,920	5.64
52	Haiderabad	Arvind Giri	SP	53,781	41.14	Rajeshwari Devi	BSP	45,375	34.71	8,406	6.43
53	Paila (SC)	Rajesh Kumar	BSP	39,291	35.83	Dataram	SP	30,890	28.17	8,401	7.66
54	Lakhimpur	Dr. Kaushal Kishore	SP	47,996	38.46	Gayan Prakesh Bajpai	BSP	46,752	37.46	1,244	1.00
55	Srinagar	R.A. Usmani	SP	34,982	29.51	Mayawati	BSP	29,207	24.64	5,775	4.87
56	Nighasan	Krishna Gopal Patel	SP	52,867	29.56	Ajay Kumar Teni	BJP	50,067	27.99	2,800	1.57
57	Dhaurehra	Awasthi Bala Prashad	BSP	80,690	55.03	Yashpal Chaudhari	SP	51,486	35.11	29,204	19.92
Sitapur District
58	Behta	Mahendra Kumar Singh	SP	48,414	33.50	Chandra Kumar Bapu	BSP	45,136	31.23	3,278	2.27
59	Biswan	Nirmal Verma	BSP	52,658	35.81	Ram Pal Yadav	SP	44,430	30.22	8,228	5.59
60	Mahmudabad	Narendra Singh	SP	81,799	50.36	Meesam Rizvi	BSP	67,988	41.86	13,811	8.50
61	Sidhauli (SC)	Dr. Hargovind Bhargava	BSP	63,568	48.59	Syam Lal Rawat	SP	51,574	39.42	11,994	9.17
62	Laharpur	Mohd. Jasmir Ansari	BSP	57,179	41.63	Anil Kumar Verma	SP	44,314	32.26	12,865	9.37
63	Sitapur	Radhey Shyam Jaiswal	SP	43,716	36.69	Rakesh Kumar	BSP	41,849	35.13	1,867	1.56
64	Hargaon (SC)	Ramhet Bharti	BSP	43,787	37.08	Ramesh Rahi	SP	37,209	31.51	6,578	5.57
65	Misrikh	Anoop Kumar	SP	62,256	47.77	Gaya Prasad	BSP	59,115	45.36	3,141	2.41
66	Machhrehta (SC)	Ram Pal Rajvanshi	SP	42,803	40.03	Vijay Kumar	BSP	33,165	31.01	9,638	9.02
Hardoi District
67	Beniganj (SC)	Ram Pal Verma	BSP	33,769	39.27	Shri Chhote Lal	BJP	23,089	26.85	10,680	12.42
68	Sandila	Abdul Mannan	BSP	56,115	46.07	Smt Ishrat Rasool	SP	53,060	43.56	3,055	2.51
69	Ahirori (SC)	Virendra Kumar	BSP	45,276	49.32	Prabhash Kumar	SP	37,489	40.83	7,787	8.49
70	Hardoi	Naresh Chandra Agarwal	SP	67,317	55.58	Ram Kumar Kuril	BSP	44,068	36.38	23,249	19.20
71	Bawan (SC)	Rajeswari	BSP	51,633	50.39	Shyam Prakash	SP	30,010	29.29	21,623	21.10
72	Pihani	Daud Ahmad	BSP	51,184	43.41	Ashok Bajpayee	SP	48,591	41.21	2,593	2.20
73	Shahabad	Ashif	BSP	41,727	34.34	Babu Khan	SP	37,721	31.05	4,006	3.29
74	Bilgram	Uprenda Tiwari	BSP	61,703	43.50	Vishram Singh Yadav	SP	49,234	34.71	12,469	8.79
75	Mallawan	Krishna Kumar Singh	BSP	47,566	36.28	Dharmagya Mishra	SP	39,448	30.09	8,118	6.19
Unnao District
76	Bangarmau	Kuldeep Singh Sengar	SP	38,384	28.81	Ram Shankar Pal	BSP	36,251	27.21	2,133	1.60
77	Safipur (SC)	Sudhir Kumar	SP	38,196	35.21	Manish Kumar	BSP	30,810	28.41	7,386	6.80
78	Unnao	Deepak Kumar	SP	42,210	35.03	Shiv Pal Singh	INC	31,098	25.81	11,112	9.22
79	Hadha	Sundar Lal Lodhi	SP	37,928	30.71	Ashutosh Shukla	BSP	36,003	29.15	1,925	1.56
80	Bhagwantnagar	Kripa Shankar Singh	BSP	46,343	36.69	Nattho Singh	SP	29,016	22.97	17,327	13.72
81	Purwa	Uday Raj	SP	48,570	33.97	Hirday Narayan Dixit	BJP	44,323	31.00	4,247	2.97
82	Hasanganj (SC)	Radhelal	BSP	51,541	44.68	Mastram	BJP	33,014	28.62	18,527	16.06
Lucknow District
83	Malihabad (SC)	Gauri Shankar	SP	44,481	31.90	Mewa Lal	BSP	42,252	30.30	2,229	1.60
84	Mahona	Nakul Dubey	BSP	54,604	26.39	Gomti Yadav	BJP	52,427	25.33	2,177	1.06
85	Lucknow East	Vidya Sagar Gupta	BJP	18,892	28.09	Fakhir Siddiqui	SP	18,261	27.15	631	0.94
86	Lucknow West	Lal Ji Tandon	BJP	43,290	38.43	Bukqal Nawab	SP	29,468	26.16	13,822	12.27
87	Lucknow Central	Suresh Kumar Srivastava	BJP	30,872	34.80	Ravi Das Mehrotra	SP	26,962	30.39	3,910	4.41
88	Lucknow Cantonment	Suresh Chandra Tiwari	BJP	30,444	30.77	Arivind Kumar Tripathi	BSP	25,068	25.34	5,376	5.43
89	Sarojininagar	Mohd. Irshad Khan	BSP	65,736	37.00	Shyam Kishore Yadav	SP	60,312	33.94	5,424	3.06
90	Mohanlalganj (SC)	R.K. Chaudhary	RSBP	31,387	29.48	Purnima Verma	BSP	24,945	23.43	6,442	6.05
Raebareli District
91	Bachhrawan (SC)	Raja Ram	INC	40,117	33.19	Ram Lal Akela	SP	28,536	23.61	11,581	9.58
92	Tiloi	Mayan Keshwar Singh	SP	44,513	31.66	Dr. Mohammad Muslim	INC	44,056	31.34	457	0.32
93	Rae Bareli	Akhilesh Kumar Singh	IND	76,603	51.90	Rudra Pratap Singh	INC	29,892	20.25	46,711	31.65
94	Sataon	Shiv Ganesh	INC	60,268	49.13	Ram Naresh Yadav	SP	25,133	20.49	35,135	28.64
95	Sareni	Ashok Kumar Singh	INC	53,938	43.53	Uma Shanker	BSP	30,609	24.70	23,329	18.83
96	Dalmau	Ajay Pal Singh	INC	51,517	36.38	Gajadhar Singh	SP	39,083	27.60	12,434	8.78
97	Salon (SC)	Shiv Balak Pasi	INC	45,078	37.14	Asha Kishor	SP	31,969	26.34	13,109	10.80
Pratapgarh District
98	Kunda	Raghuraj Pratap Singh	IND	73,732	64.96	Shiv Prakash Mishra	BSP	20,604	18.15	53,128	46.81
99	Bihar (SC)	Vinod Kumar	IND	42,034	47.22	Krishna Chandra	BSP	32,874	36.93	9,160	10.29
100	Rampur Khas	Pramod Kumar	INC	55,221	48.01	Kunwar Viggyat Singh	SP	24,227	21.06	30,994	26.95
101	Gadwara	Brijesh Saurabh	BSP	47,209	42.74	Raja Ram	SP	27,960	25.31	19,249	17.43
102	Pratapgarh	Sanjay	BSP	35,308	30.74	Haji Abdul Salam	SP	26,352	22.94	8,956	7.80
103	Birapur	Ram Siromani Shukla	BSP	43,200	33.99	Shiva Kant Ojha	BJP	38,693	30.45	4,507	3.54
104	Patti	Rajendra Pratap Singh	BJP	42,579	29.74	Bal Kumar	SP	42,125	29.42	454	0.32
Sultanpur District
105	Amethi	Amita Singh	INC	48,108	40.59	Ashish	BSP	35,684	30.11	12,424	10.48
106	Gauriganj	Chandra Prakash	BSP	34,386	29.73	Mohd. Naim	INC	28,398	24.55	5,988	5.18
107	Jagdishpur (SC)	Ram Sewak	INC	34,563	37.60	Shri Ram	BSP	21,356	23.23	13,207	14.37
108	Issauli	Chandra Bhadra Singh	SP	53,911	43.92	Krishna Kumar	BSP	49,473	40.30	4,438	3.62
109	Sultanpur	Anoop Sanda	SP	29,504	23.28	Om Prakash Pandey	BJP	24,753	19.53	4,751	3.75
110	Jaising/pur	Om Prakash Singh	BSP	37,013	32.08	Jainarayan Tiwari	INC	19,903	17.25	17,110	14.83
111	Chanda	Vinod Kumar	BSP	40,537	32.45	Manoj Kumar Pandey	SP	24,773	19.83	15,764	12.62
112	Kadipur (SC)	Bhagelu Ram	BSP	35,312	29.09	Ram Chandra Chaudhary	SP	33,933	27.95	1,379	1.14
Ambedkar Nagar District
113	Katehari	Dharm Raj Nishad	BSP	47,689	32.52	Jai Shanker Pandey	SP	47,449	32.35	240	0.17
114	Akbarpur	Ram Achal Rajbhar	BSP	55,875	34.62	Rammurti Verma	SP	44,035	27.28	11,840	7.34
115	Jalalpur	Sher Bahadur	BSP	65,734	41.12	Rakesh Pandey	SP	61,434	38.43	4,300	2.69
116	Jahangirganj (SC)	Tribhuwan Dutt	BSP	56,905	39.64	Ghanshyam Chandra	SP	48,954	34.10	7,951	5.54
117	Tanda	Lal Ji Verma	BSP	65,365	39.96	Azimul Huqe Pahalwan	SP	62,910	38.46	2,455	1.50
Faizabad District
118	Ayodhya	Lallu Singh	BJP	58,493	37.00	Indra Pratap Tiwari	SP	52,752	33.37	5,741	3.63
119	Bikapur	Jitendra Kumar Bablu	BSP	52,424	32.96	Sita Ram Nishad	SP	42,201	26.53	10,223	6.43
120	Milkipur	Anand Sen	BSP	60,515	40.92	Ram Chandra Yadav	SP	51,136	34.58	9,379	6.34
121	Sohawal (SC)	Awadhesh Prasad	SP	48,624	33.08	Ramu Priyadarshi	BSP	38,753	26.37	9,871	6.71
Barabanki District
122	Rudauli	Abbas Ali Zaidi	SP	45,388	36.08	Ashok Kumar Singh	BSP	41,715	33.16	3,673	2.92
123	Dariyabad	Rajeev Kumar Singh	SP	56,608	43.74	Vivekanand	BSP	42,840	33.10	13,768	10.64
124	Siddhaur (SC)	Dharmi Rawat	BSP	45,415	37.22	Ram Magan	SP	35,194	28.84	10,221	8.38
125	Haidergarh	Arvind Kumar Singh Gope	SP	36,933	31.07	Sunder Lal Dixit	BJP	32,763	27.57	4,170	3.50
126	Masauli	Fareed Mahfooz Kidwai	BSP	50,671	36.30	Rakesh Kumar Verma	IJP	45,307	32.45	5,364	3.85
127	Nawabganj	Sangram Singh	BSP	49,030	34.83	Chhotey Lal Yadav	SP	38,365	27.25	10,665	7.58
128	Fatehpur (SC)	Km. Meeta Gautam	BSP	33,698	26.77	Kusum Lata Singh	SP	29,227	23.22	4,471	3.55
129	Ramnagar	Amresh Kumar	BSP	30,363	24.89	Kunvar Ramveer Singh	SP	27,807	22.80	2,556	2.09
Bahraich District
130	Kaiserganj	Gulam Mhd. Khan	BSP	38,911	34.19	Ramtej Yadav	SP	20,889	18.36	18,022	15.83
131	Fakharpur	Krishana Kumar	BSP	38,983	31.85	Arun Veer Singh	SP	38,547	31.49	436	0.36
132	Mahsi	Sureshwar Singh	BJP	50,286	36.56	Ali Akbar	BSP	49,845	36.24	441	0.32
133	Nanpara	Waris Ali	BSP	54,965	36.39	Jata Shanker Singh	BJP	34,439	22.80	20,526	13.59
134	Charda (SC)	Shabbir Ahmad	SP	33,541	32.16	Savitri Phoole	BJP	31,859	30.54	1,682	1.62
135	Bhinga	Daddan	BSP	28,707	29.05	Mohammad Aslam	INC	28,616	28.96	91	0.09
136	Bahraich	Dr. Viqar Ahmed Shah	SP	45,984	34.06	Vinod Tripathi	BSP	43,540	32.25	2,444	1.81
137	Ikauna (SC)	Ram Sagar Akela	BSP	39,427	37.18	Akshaibar Lal	BJP	32,185	30.35	7,242	6.83
Balrampur District
138	Gainsari	Alauddin	BSP	44,893	35.36	Shiv Pratap Yadava	SP	38,456	30.29	6,437	5.07
139	Tulsipur	Kaushlendra Nath Yogi	BJP	39,250	32.96	Abdul Mashood Khan	SP	32,751	27.50	6,499	5.46
140	Balrampur	Dhirendra Pratap Singh	BSP	25,180	24.43	Vinay Kumar Pandey	INC	23,269	22.57	1,911	1.86
141	Utraula	Shyamlal	BJP	37,000	33.23	Anwar Mahmood Khan	SP	32,195	28.92	4,805	4.31
Gonda District
142	Sadullanagar	Arif Anwar Hasmi	SP	40,850	36.01	Ram Pratap Singh	BJP	28,749	25.34	12,101	10.67
143	Mankapur (SC)	Ram Bishun Azad	SP	43,256	39.85	Paltu Ram	BSP	38,634	35.59	4,622	4.26
144	Mujehna	Nandita Shukla	SP	46,600	38.82	Ram Pal Singh	BSP	37,684	31.39	8,916	7.43
145	Gonda	Moh. Jalil Khan	BSP	39,600	34.02	Vinod Kumar	SP	36,958	31.75	2,642	2.27
146	Katra Bazar	Baij Nath Dubey	SP	46,776	37.53	Bavan Singh	BJP	42,297	33.93	4,479	3.60
147	Colonelganj	Ajay Pratap Singh	INC	55,403	45.22	Yogesh Pratap Singh	SP	32,608	26.61	22,795	18.61
148	Dixir (SC)	Ramesh Chandra	BSP	41,618	43.23	Ramapati Shastri	BJP	38,260	39.74	3,358	3.49
Basti District
149	Harraiya	Raj Kishore Singh	SP	46,411	32.89	Anil Singh	BSP	41,266	29.25	5,145	3.64
150	Captainganj	Ram Prasad Chaudhary	BSP	47,372	32.44	Krishna Kinker Singh	IND	28,852	19.76	18,520	12.68
151	Nagar East (SC)	Doodhram	BSP	43,419	37.87	Ram Karan Arya	SP	32,413	28.27	11,006	9.60
152	Basti	Jeetendra Kumar	BSP	37,258	28.17	Jagdambika Pal	INC	27,478	20.78	9,780	7.39
153	Ramnagar	Rajendra Chaudhery	BSP	41,580	33.63	Sanjay Jaiswal	INC	35,979	29.10	5,601	4.53
Siddharthnagar District
154	Domariaganj	Taufique Ahmad	BSP	32,626	26.05	Kamal Yusuf Malik	SP	31,653	25.27	973	0.78
155	Itwa	Mata Prasad Pandey	SP	42,950	33.88	Javed	BSP	40,622	32.05	2,328	1.83
156	Shohratgarh	Chaudhari Ravind Pratap	INC	33,716	24.35	Mumtaz Ahmad	BSP	31,524	22.76	2,192	1.59
157	Naugarh	Ishwar Chandra Shukla	INC	30,417	22.85	Dhanraj Yadav	BJP	24,071	18.08	6,346	4.77
158	Bansi	Lal Ji Yadav	SP	38,648	32.67	Jai Pratap Singh	BJP	36,134	30.55	2,514	2.12
Sant Kabir Nagar District
159	Khesraha	Mhd. Tabis Khan	BSP	47,522	34.90	Diwakar Vikram Singh	SP	40,588	29.81	6,934	5.09
160	Menhdawal	Abdul Kalam	SP	35,947	29.62	Mashhoor Alam	BSP	29,374	24.21	6,573	5.41
161	Khalilabad (SC)	Bhagwandas	BSP	41,497	39.44	Algoo Prasad Chauhan	SP	31,841	30.27	9,656	9.17
162	Hainsarbazar (SC)	Dasharath Chauhan	SP	39,165	35.25	Ram Sidhare	BSP	38,079	34.27	1,086	0.98
Gorakhpur District
163	Bansgaon (SC)	Sadal Prasad	BSP	41,586	34.59	Sant Prasad	BJP	39,302	32.69	2,284	1.90
164	Dhuriapar	Rajendra Singh	SP	36,514	28.52	Lal Amin Khan	BSP	35,955	28.08	559	0.44
165	Chillupar	Rajesh Tripathi	BSP	54,107	42.94	Harishankar Tiwari	ABLTC	47,174	37.44	6,933	5.50
166	Kauriram	Ambika	BSP	56,072	39.62	Ram Bhuwal	SP	42,148	29.78	13,924	9.84
167	Mundera Bazar (SC)	Madho Prasad	INC	38,552	32.37	Harilal	BSP	29,823	25.04	8,729	7.33
168	Pipraich	Jamuna Nisad	BSP	41,584	30.82	Jitendra Kumar	IND	32,258	23.91	9,326	6.91
169	Gorakhpur	Radha Mohan Das	BJP	49,715	54.76	Bhanu Prakash Mishra	SP	27,323	30.10	22,392	24.66
170	Maniram	Vijay Bahadur Yadav	BJP	47,657	32.12	Kamlesh Paswan	SP	44,409	29.93	3,248	2.19
171	Sahjanwa	Yashpal Singh Ravat	IND	43,751	32.40	Dev Narain	BSP	40,694	30.13	3,057	2.27
Maharajganj District
172	Paniara	Fateh Bahadur	BSP	52,007	38.25	Badri Prasad	SP	48,117	35.39	3,890	2.86
173	Pharenda	Bajrang Bahadur Singh	BJP	40,327	28.93	Virendra Chaudhary	BSP	31,413	22.54	8,914	6.39
174	Lakshmipur	Amar Mani	SP	64,377	41.14	Kaushal Kishore	RJD	45,244	28.92	19,133	12.22
175	Siswa	Avnindra Nath Dwedi	BJP	51,206	33.60	Shivendra Singh	SP	43,835	28.76	7,371	4.84
176	Maharajganj (SC)	Sripati	SP	38,529	26.84	Nirmesh Mangal	BSP	37,640	26.22	889	0.62
177	Shyam Deurwa	Janaradan Prasad Ojha	SP	48,351	33.90	Gyanendra	BJP	37,503	26.29	10,848	7.61
Kushinagar District
178	Naurangia (SC)	Shambhu Chaudhary	BJP	38,308	27.66	Purnamasi Dehati	SP	35,118	25.36	3,190	2.30
179	Ramkola	Jaswant Singh	BJP	45,097	32.22	Radheshyam Singh	SP	40,810	29.16	4,287	3.06
180	Hata (SC)	Ramapati	BJP	36,617	29.87	Kailash Chand	SP	29,172	23.80	7,445	6.07
181	Padrauna	Kuwar Ratanjit Pratap	INC	29,913	20.40	Adya Shukla	BSP	24,494	16.70	5,419	3.70
182	Seorahi	Dr. P.K. Rai	SP	49,498	32.63	Nand Kishor Mishra	BJP	41,838	27.58	7,660	5.05
183	Fazilnagar	Vishva Nath	SP	52,301	37.38	Jagadish	BSP	28,914	20.67	23,387	16.71
Deoria District
184	Kasia	Brahma Shankar	SP	52,831	34.72	Surya Pratap	BJP	50,264	33.03	2,567	1.69
185	Gauri Bazar	Pramod Singh	BSP	53,071	36.16	Shaqir Ali	SP	40,014	27.27	13,057	8.89
186	Rudrapur	Suresh	BSP	27,566	23.33	Jai Prakash Nishad	BJP	21,530	18.22	6,036	5.11
187	Deoria	Deenanath Kushwaha	SP	25,568	18.12	Kamlesh	BSP	22,776	16.14	2,792	1.98
188	Bhatpar Rani	Kameswar Upadhyay	SP	47,908	35.11	Sabhakunwar	BSP	44,292	32.46	3,616	2.65
189	Salempur	Ch. Fasiha Vaseer	SP	34,844	28.52	Margub Ahmad	BSP	25,049	20.51	9,795	8.01
190	Barhaj	Ram Prasad Jaisawal	BSP	44,347	36.41	Swaminath	SP	26,485	21.75	17,862	14.66
Mau District
191	Natthupur	Umesh Panday	BSP	40,066	33.74	Amresh Chand Panday	SP	34,040	28.67	6,026	5.07
192	Ghosi	Phagoo	BSP	39,849	31.75	Kapil Deo	SP	32,031	25.52	7,818	6.23
Azamgarh District
193	Sagri	Sarvesh Kumar Singh Sipu	SP	47,422	33.90	Malik Masood	BSP	40,287	28.80	7,135	5.10
194	Gopalpur	Shyam Narayan	BSP	44,729	35.17	Waseem	SP	43,265	34.02	1,464	1.15
195	Azamgarh	Durga Prasad Yadav	SP	52,604	43.96	Ramakant	BSP	42,350	35.39	10,254	8.57
196	Nizamabad	Angad Yadav	BSP	60,072	45.40	Alam Badi	SP	46,674	35.28	13,398	10.12
197	Atraulia	Surendra Prasad Mishra	BSP	66,413	45.06	Balram Yadav	SP	63,217	42.89	3,196	2.17
198	Phulpur	Arun Kumar Yadav	SP	47,766	35.46	Imran	BSP	45,268	33.60	2,498	1.86
199	Saraimir (SC)	Bhola	SP	48,172	37.44	Heera Lal	BSP	47,458	36.88	714	0.56
200	Mehnagar (SC)	Vidya Chaudhary	BSP	40,618	31.72	Ram Jag	CPI(M)	31,077	24.27	9,541	7.45
201	Lalganj	Sukhdeo Rajbhar	BSP	54,336	38.18	Narendra	BJP	32,521	22.85	21,815	15.33
202	Mubarakpur	Chandradeo	BSP	43,069	29.87	Ram Darshan	SP	40,593	28.15	2,476	1.72
Mau District
203	Mhd. Gohna (SC)	Rajendra Kumar	BSP	42,949	32.60	Banwari	SP	39,387	29.89	3,562	2.71
204	Mau	Mukhtar Ansari	IND	70,226	46.78	Vijay Pratap	BSP	63,208	42.10	7,018	4.68
Ballia District
205	Rasra (SC)	Ghoora Ram	BSP	27,018	25.54	Anil Kumar	BJP	23,709	22.41	3,309	3.13
206	Siar	Kedarnath Verma	BSP	42,256	37.04	Sharda Nand Anchal	SP	31,960	28.01	10,296	9.03
207	Chilkahar	Sanatan	SP	36,454	29.00	Sangram	BSP	33,328	26.52	3,126	2.48
208	Sikandarpur	Shribhagwan	BSP	39,773	33.00	Jiyaudin Rizwi	SP	31,774	26.36	7,999	6.64
209	Bansdih	Shiv Shanker	BSP	31,488	26.53	Ramgovind Chaudhary	SP	31,000	26.12	488	0.41
210	Doaba	Subhash	BSP	22,549	26.45	Bharat	BJP	19,546	22.93	3,003	3.52
211	Ballia	Manju	BSP	32,084	29.92	Narad	SP	28,916	26.96	3,168	2.96
212	Kopachit	Ambika Chaudhary	SP	41,405	33.57	Sudhir	BSP	35,228	28.56	6,177	5.01
Ghazipur District
213	Zahoorabad	Kalicharan	BSP	42,654	28.17	Sanand	SP	25,554	16.88	17,100	11.29
214	Mohammadabad	Sibagtulla Ansari	SP	56,361	39.38	Alka Rai	BJP	52,975	37.02	3,386	2.36
215	Dildarnagar	Pashupati	BSP	55,150	43.43	Omprakash	SP	47,968	37.77	7,182	5.66
216	Zamania	Raj Kumar	BSP	42,408	29.90	Kailash	SP	41,440	29.22	968	0.68
217	Ghazipur	Saiyyada Fatima	SP	41,829	30.73	Umashankar Kushwaha	BSP	40,698	29.90	1,131	0.83
218	Jakhania (SC)	Vijay Kumar	BSP	49,885	37.43	Gareeb	SP	41,074	30.82	8,811	6.61
219	Sadat (SC)	Amerika	BSP	46,280	34.04	Ramesh	SP	38,350	28.21	7,930	5.83
Chandauli District
220	Dhanapur	Sushil Kumar	BSP	72,642	49.41	Prabhu Narayan	SP	55,403	37.69	17,239	11.72
221	Chandauli (SC)	Sharda Prasad	BSP	44,355	34.87	Ujagir	SP	35,849	28.18	8,506	6.69
222	Chakia (SC)	Jitendra Kumar	BSP	48,655	36.36	Satya Prakash Sonker	SP	45,664	34.13	2,991	2.23
223	Mughalsarai	Ram Kishun	SP	37,467	30.46	Babban	BSP	35,530	28.89	1,937	1.57
Varanasi District
224	Saidpur	Dinanath Pandey	BSP	52,869	34.53	Mahendra Nath Pandey	BJP	40,216	26.27	12,653	8.26
225	Varanasi Cantonment	Jyotasana Shrivastav	BJP	31,642	26.04	Manoj Rai Pappu	SP	26,163	21.53	5,479	4.51
226	Varanasi South	Shyam Deo Roy	BJP	33,021	46.24	Dayashankar Misra	INC	19,319	27.05	13,702	19.19
227	Varanasi North	Haji Abdul Samad	SP	26,544	29.85	Shivnath Yadav	BJP	24,345	27.38	2,199	2.47
228	Chiraigaon	Udai Lal Maurya	BSP	45,251	27.60	Radhakrishna	SBSP	37,517	22.89	7,734	4.71
229	Kolasla	Ajay Rai	BJP	41,935	28.27	Awadhesh Singh	BSP	36,979	24.93	4,956	3.34
230	Gangapur	Surendra Singh Patel	SP	49,734	30.52	Neel Ratan Patel	AD	39,760	24.40	9,974	6.12
Bhadohi District
231	Aurai	Rang Nath Mishra	BSP	53,759	33.93	Rita Singh	AD	51,028	32.20	2,731	1.73
232	Gyanpur	Vijay Kumar	SP	61,230	40.25	Dinesh Kumar	BSP	58,652	38.56	2,578	1.69
233	Bhadohi (SC)	Archana Saroj	BSP	47,555	38.42	Deena Nath Bhashkar	SP	41,225	33.30	6,330	5.12
Jaunpur District
234	Barsathi	Ravindra Nath Tripathi	BSP	40,994	34.28	Shachindra Nath Tripathi	SP	27,196	22.74	13,798	11.54
235	Mariahu	K. K. Sachan	BSP	32,971	26.64	Shradha Yadav	IND	31,261	25.25	1,710	1.39
236	Kerakat (SC)	Biraju Ram	BSP	42,584	36.42	Munni Devi	SP	32,346	27.66	10,238	8.76
237	Beyalsi	Jagdish Narain	BSP	47,514	37.92	Subhash Chandra	SP	32,679	26.08	14,835	11.84
238	Jaunpur	Javed Ansari	SP	37,343	31.64	Tej Bahadur Maurya	BSP	30,485	25.82	6,858	5.82
239	Rari	Dhananjay Singh	JD(U)	44,641	31.57	Lal Bahadur Yadav	SP	40,526	28.66	4,115	2.91
240	Shahganj (SC)	Jagdish Sonkar	SP	41,354	30.70	Rampher Gautam	BSP	40,688	30.20	666	0.50
241	Khutahan	Shailendra Yadav Lalai	SP	45,947	33.13	Dinesh Kumar Yadav	BSP	35,647	25.70	10,300	7.43
242	Garwara	Seema	BJP	43,236	36.56	Raj Narain Bind	SP	30,603	25.88	12,633	10.68
243	Machhlishahr	Subhash Pandey	BSP	55,181	41.64	Jwala Prasad Yadav	SP	45,656	34.46	9,525	7.18
Sonbhadra District
244	Dudhi (SC)	Chandra Mani Prasad	BSP	51,720	32.25	Shiv Shankar	SP	47,348	29.52	4,372	2.73
245	Robertsganj (SC)	Satya Narayan Jaisal	BSP	43,750	30.05	Munna	SP	28,882	19.83	14,868	10.22
Mirzapur District
246	Rajgarh	Anil Kumar Maurya	BSP	51,943	30.70	Ravindra Bahadur	SP	34,656	20.49	17,287	10.21
247	Chunar	Om Prakash Singh	BJP	45,025	29.48	Jagtamaba Singh Patel	SP	41,582	27.23	3,443	2.25
248	Majhwa	Ramesh Chand Bind	BSP	45,199	31.92	Shiv Shankar Singh	SP	40,606	28.68	4,593	3.24
249	Mirzapur	Kailash Chaurasiya	SP	38,617	32.27	Ramchandra Maurya	BSP	29,540	24.68	9,077	7.59
250	Chhanvey (SC)	Surybhan	BSP	43,045	31.98	Sriram Bharti	SP	22,290	16.56	20,755	15.42
Prayagraj District
251	Meja (SC)	Raj Bali Jaisal	BSP	54,859	39.84	Ram Kripal	CPI(M)	38,647	28.07	16,212	11.77
252	Karchana	Anand Kumar	BSP	62,118	43.48	Ujjawal Raman Singh	SP	61,773	43.24	345	0.24
253	Bara	Udaibhan Karwaria	BJP	51,592	33.31	Deepak Singh Patel	BSP	47,358	30.58	4,234	2.73
254	Jhusi	Praveen Patel	BSP	59,931	45.47	Vizma Yadav	SP	42,853	32.52	17,078	12.95
255	Handia	Rakesh Dhar Tripathi	BSP	62,151	41.49	Mahesh Narayan Singh	SP	60,809	40.59	1,342	0.90
256	Pratappur	Jokhu Lal Yadav	SP	41,454	30.54	Sayeed Ahmad	BSP	34,697	25.56	6,757	4.98
257	Soraon	Mohd. Muztaba Siddiqi	BSP	38,280	29.41	Mohd. Ayub	SP	32,739	25.15	5,541	4.26
258	Nawabganj	Guru Prasad Maurya	BSP	40,531	34.61	Shiv Prasad Mishra	SP	31,518	26.91	9,013	7.70
259	Allahabad North	Anugrah Narayan Singh	INC	29,938	34.49	Harsh Vardhan Bajpai	BSP	28,151	32.43	1,787	2.06
260	Allahabad South	Nand Gopal Gupta	BSP	34,939	37.29	Keshri Nath Tripathi	BJP	20,129	21.48	14,810	15.81
261	Allahabad West	Pooja Pal	BSP	56,198	47.08	Khalid Azim	SP	45,876	38.44	10,322	8.64
Kaushambi District
262	Chail (SC)	Daya Ram	BSP	36,742	37.84	Ram Chandra	SP	21,782	22.44	14,960	15.40
263	Manjhanpur (SC)	Indrajeet Saroj	BSP	57,899	47.52	Suresh Pasi	SP	30,536	25.06	27,363	22.46
264	Sirathu (SC)	Wachaspati	BSP	48,997	45.85	Matesh Chander Sonkar	SP	26,999	25.27	21,998	20.58
Fatehpur District
265	Khaga	Ranavendra Pratap	BJP	45,109	28.85	Munna Lal Maurya	INC	37,214	23.80	7,895	5.05
266	Kishunpur (SC)	Murlidhar	BSP	38,357	36.60	Krishna Paswan	BJP	33,490	31.96	4,867	4.64
267	Haswa	Ayodhya Prasad Pal	BSP	35,987	32.41	Daljeet Nishad	SP	26,599	23.95	9,388	8.46
268	Fatehpur	Radheshyam Gupta	BJP	44,237	33.94	Athar Siddiqui	BSP	30,743	23.58	13,494	10.36
269	Jahanabad	Aditya Pandey	BSP	36,760	29.44	Madan Gopal Verma	SP	31,452	25.19	5,308	4.25
270	Bindki	Sukhdev Prasad Verma	BSP	42,059	36.01	Rajendra Singh Patel	BJP	31,405	26.89	10,654	9.12
Kanpur Nagar District
271	Aryanagar	Irfan Solanki	SP	36,376	52.47	Harish Matreja	BJP	13,173	19.00	23,203	33.47
272	Sisamau (SC)	Sanjeev Dariyabadi	INC	25,775	33.79	Rakesh Sonkar	BJP	24,411	32.00	1,364	1.79
273	Generalganj	Salil Vishnoi	BJP	29,461	40.01	Surendra Mohan Agarwal	SP	26,977	36.63	2,484	3.38
274	Kanpur Cantonment	Satish Mahana	BJP	47,381	46.73	Mehtab Alam	SP	20,845	20.56	26,536	26.17
275	Govindnagar	Ajay Kapoor	INC	1,10,478	45.61	Hanuman Mishra	BJP	70,018	28.91	40,460	16.70
276	Kalyanpur	Premlata Katiyar	BJP	42,349	29.47	Nirmal Tewari	BSP	41,675	29.00	674	0.47
277	Sarsaul	Aruna Tomar	SP	57,046	38.47	Anant Mishra	BSP	56,704	38.24	342	0.23
278	Ghatampur	Ramprakash Kushwaha	BSP	65,793	47.32	Rakesh Sachan	SP	63,316	45.54	2,477	1.78
279	Chaubepur	Pratibha Shukla	BSP	41,703	34.34	Amitabh Bajpai	SP	31,435	25.89	10,268	8.45
280	Bilhaur (SC)	Kamlesh Chandra	BSP	52,729	41.69	Shiv Kumar Beria	SP	48,770	38.56	3,959	3.13
Kanpur Dehat District
281	Bhognipur (SC)	Raghu Nath Prasad	BSP	36,829	32.47	Arun Kumari	SP	33,733	29.74	3,096	2.73
282	Rajpur	Mithlesh Kumari	BSP	45,251	38.92	Sanshank Shekhar	SP	25,418	21.86	19,833	17.06
283	Sarvankhera	Ram Swaroop Singh	SP	46,145	35.66	Mathura Prasad Pal	BSP	43,001	33.23	3,144	2.43
284	Derapur	Mahesh Chandra	BSP	43,656	34.30	Devendra Singh	BJP	40,093	31.50	3,563	2.80
Auraiya District
285	Auraiya	Shekhar	BSP	53,435	38.73	Kamlesh Kumar	SP	47,177	34.19	6,258	4.54
286	Ajitmal (SC)	Ashok Kumar	BSP	45,937	41.77	Madan Singh	SP	36,710	33.38	9,227	8.39
287	Bidhuna	Dhani Ram	SP	47,846	34.26	Vinay Shakya	BSP	47,550	34.05	296	0.21
Etawah District
288	Lakhana (SC)	Bheem Rao Ambedkar	BSP	50,725	42.92	Sukh Devi Verma	SP	43,855	37.11	6,870	5.81
289	Etawah	Mahendra Singh Rajput	SP	46,372	38.61	Narendra Nath	BSP	33,307	27.73	13,065	10.88
290	Jaswantnagar	Shiv Pal Singh Yadav	SP	73,211	57.81	Baba Harnarayan Yadav	BSP	42,404	33.48	30,807	24.33
291	Bharthana	Mulayam Singh Yadav	SP	62,799	48.21	Shiv Prasad Yadav	BSP	53,328	40.94	9,471	7.27
Kannauj District
292	Kannauj (SC)	Anil Kumar	SP	49,740	36.21	Kalyan Singh Dohre	BSP	41,327	30.08	8,413	6.13
293	Umardha	Kailash Singh Rajput	BSP	44,416	35.58	Vijay Bahadur Pal	SP	41,480	33.23	2,936	2.35
294	Chhibramau	Arvind Singh	SP	45,708	32.99	Jai Kumar Tiwari	BSP	40,888	29.51	4,820	3.48
Farrukhabad District
295	Kamalganj	Tahir Hussain Siddiki	BSP	51,164	37.04	Mukesh Rajput	BJP	34,184	24.75	16,980	12.29
296	Farrukhabad	Vijay Singh	SP	46,080	39.77	Major Sunil Dutt	BJP	35,514	30.65	10,566	9.12
297	Kaimganj	Kuldip Singh Gangwar	BSP	36,978	29.09	Louise Khursheed	INC	27,325	21.50	9,653	7.59
298	Mohammdabad	Narendra Singh	SP	48,031	39.61	Nagendra Singh	BSP	44,760	36.91	3,271	2.70
Chitrakoot District
299	Manikpur (SC)	Daddu Prashad	BSP	44,686	46.87	Satya Narayan	SP	38,374	40.25	6,312	6.62
300	Karwi	Dinesh Prashad	BSP	50,518	43.11	R. K. Singh Patel	SP	49,162	41.95	1,356	1.16
Banda District
301	Baberu	Vishambhar Singh Yadav	SP	32,568	29.62	Gaya Charan Dinakar	BSP	32,394	29.46	174	0.16
302	Tindwari	Vishambhar Prasad	SP	33,725	31.27	Dal Jeet	JM	26,512	24.59	7,213	6.68
303	Banda	Vivek Kumar Singh	INC	34,524	29.32	Babulal Kushwaha	BSP	34,293	29.12	231	0.20
304	Naraini	Purushottam Naresh	BSP	31,694	28.23	Piyariya	RLD	27,251	24.27	4,443	3.96
Hamirpur District
305	Hamirpur	Ashok Kumar Singh	SP	43,672	36.04	Shiv Charan Prajapati	BSP	36,576	30.19	7,096	5.85
306	Maudaha	Badshah Singh	BSP	51,752	45.43	Apni Chiraiya Prajapati	SP	34,203	30.03	17,549	15.40
307	Rath	Chaudari Lodhi	BSP	42,601	35.45	Shree Niwas	SP	33,420	27.81	9,181	7.64
Mahoba District
308	Charkhari (SC)	Anil Kumar Ahirwar	BSP	39,330	33.56	Ambesh Kumari	SP	32,386	27.63	6,944	5.93
309	Mahoba	Rakesh Kumar	BSP	32,017	22.17	Girja Charan	SP	27,556	19.08	4,461	3.09
Lalitpur District
310	Mehroni	Ram Kumar Tiwari	BSP	71,097	36.31	Pooran Bundela	INC	46,861	23.93	24,236	12.38
311	Lalitpur	Nathu Ram Kushwaha	BSP	78,010	42.48	Virendra Bundela	SP	58,200	31.70	19,810	10.78
Jhansi District
312	Jhansi	Pradeep Jain Aditya	INC	65,552	51.72	Ramesh Kumar Sharma	BSP	31,776	25.07	33,776	26.65
313	Babina (SC)	Ratan Lal Ahirwar	BSP	62,771	44.66	Shatish Jatariya	SP	33,973	24.17	28,798	20.49
314	Mauranipur (SC)	Bhagwati Prasad Sagar	BSP	46,330	31.67	Bihari Lal Arya	INC	35,584	24.32	10,746	7.35
315	Garoutha	Deep Narayan Singh	SP	57,981	41.32	Ranjeet Singh Judeo	INC	45,360	32.32	12,621	9.00
Jalaun District
316	Konch (SC)	Ajay Singh	BSP	33,772	32.70	Gauri Shankar	BJP	31,820	30.81	1,952	1.89
317	Orai	Vinod Chaturvedi	INC	38,982	26.49	Suresh Tiwari	BSP	35,889	24.39	3,093	2.10
318	Kalpi	Chhote Singh	BSP	46,275	36.34	Sriram Pal	SP	44,145	34.66	2,130	1.68
319	Madhogarh	Hari Om	BSP	51,135	36.36	Sant Ram Singh	BJP	47,833	34.01	3,302	2.35
Mainpuri District
320	Bhongaon	Alok Kumar	SP	39,224	34.42	Bijendra Singh	BSP	34,107	29.93	5,117	4.49
321	Kishni (SC)	Km. Sandhya	SP	41,012	37.30	Sunil Kumar	BSP	35,409	32.20	5,603	5.10
322	Karhal	Sobaran Singh	SP	52,471	45.23	Ramesh	BSP	35,142	30.30	17,329	14.93
Firozabad District
323	Shikohabad	Ashok Yadav	IND	58,240	48.29	Hariom	SP	40,267	33.39	17,973	14.90
324	Jasrana	Ram Prakash Yadav	IND	40,649	32.35	Ramvir Singh	SP	32,836	26.13	7,813	6.22
Mainpuri District
325	Ghiror	Jaivir Singh	BSP	47,528	41.27	Anujesh Pratap	SP	45,219	39.27	2,309	2.00
326	Mainpuri	Ashok Singh Chauhan	BJP	49,367	38.53	Kalicharan Yadav	SP	44,898	35.04	4,469	3.49
Etah District
327	Aliganj	Avadhpal Yadav	BSP	57,149	42.00	Rameshwar Singh	SP	45,784	33.64	11,365	8.36
328	Patiali	Ajay Yadav	BSP	39,335	36.76	Rajednrda Singh	SP	28,956	27.06	10,379	9.70
329	Sakit	Suraj Singh	SP	24,627	28.04	Neeraj Kishore	BSP	24,269	27.63	358	0.41
330	Sorom	Mamtesh	BSP	28,578	30.89	Devendra Pratap	BJP	23,366	25.26	5,212	5.63
331	Kasganj	Hasratulla	BSP	35,105	32.39	Netram Singh	BJP	32,733	30.20	2,372	2.19
332	Etah	Prajapalan	BJP	48,529	44.01	Shishupal Singh	SP	27,601	25.03	20,928	18.98
333	Nidhauli Kalan	Anil Kumar Singh	SP	29,829	30.59	Mahesh Chand	BSP	22,567	23.14	7,262	7.45
334	Jalesar (SC)	Kuver Singh	BJP	31,038	35.07	Ranvir Singh Kashyap	BSP	30,966	34.99	72	0.08
Firozabad District
335	Firozabad	Nasir Uddin	BSP	42,700	33.48	Azim Bhai	SP	32,506	25.48	10,194	8.00
336	Tundla (SC)	Rakesh Babu	BSP	50,002	37.32	Shiv Singh Chak	BJP	28,178	21.03	21,824	16.29
Agra District
337	Bah	Madhusdan Sharma	BSP	38,877	40.82	Raja Mahendra	BJP	34,254	35.96	4,623	4.86
338	Fatehabad	Rajendra Singh	BJP	38,672	29.11	Chhote Lal Verma	SP	33,567	25.27	5,105	3.84
339	Etmadpur (SC)	Narayan Singh	BSP	47,539	40.52	Baby Rani Maurya	BJP	37,916	32.32	9,623	8.20
340	Dayalbagh	Dr. Dharmpal Singh	JM	56,708	32.87	Kishan Lal Baghel	BSP	53,759	31.16	2,949	1.71
341	Agra Cantonment	Julfikar Ahmed Bhutto	BSP	30,524	31.67	Keshomehra	BJP	27,149	28.17	3,375	3.50
342	Agra East	Jagan Prashad Garg	BJP	31,200	34.99	Sarv Prakash Kapoor	BSP	22,937	25.72	8,263	9.27
343	Agra West (SC)	Guteyari Lal Duves	BSP	39,951	39.82	Rambabu Harit	BJP	34,577	34.46	5,374	5.36
344	Kheragarh	Bhagwan Singh	BSP	46,829	37.05	Keshav Dexit	BJP	33,609	26.59	13,220	10.46
345	Fatehpur Sikri	Surajpal Singh	BSP	44,856	34.09	Rajkumar Chahar	BJP	43,407	32.98	1,449	1.11
Mathura District
346	Goverdhan (SC)	Puran Prakash	RLD	43,963	38.96	Ajay Kumar Poeia	BSP	38,100	33.76	5,863	5.20
347	Mathura	Prdeep Mathur	INC	45,383	36.96	Murari Lal	BJP	24,293	19.78	21,090	17.18
348	Chhata	Laxmi Narayan	BSP	55,591	46.20	Tej Pal Singh	RLD	29,633	24.63	25,958	21.57
349	Mat	Shyam Sunder Sharma	ABLTC	46,932	36.50	Rampal Singh	RLD	35,394	27.53	11,538	8.97
350	Gokul	Raj Kumar Rawat	BSP	48,916	43.42	Nabav Singh	RLD	39,874	35.39	9,042	8.03
Hathras District
351	Sadabad	Dr. Anil Chaudhary	RLD	55,578	47.85	Vinod Updhayay	BSP	39,832	34.30	15,746	13.55
352	Hathras	Ramveer Upadhayay	BSP	56,698	46.09	Devendra Agarwal	RLD	41,288	33.57	15,410	12.52
353	Sasni (SC)	Genda Lal Chaudhary	BSP	37,506	34.16	Ranjeet Suman	SP	31,751	28.92	5,755	5.24
354	Sikandara Rao	Yashpal Singh Chauhan	BJP	40,510	31.59	Madhu Baghel	SP	38,367	29.92	2,143	1.67
Aligarh District
355	Gangiri	Ram Singh	BJP	37,575	30.60	Muzahid Khan	BSP	35,998	29.32	1,577	1.28
356	Atrauli	Premlata Devi	BJP	50,390	47.71	Harish Sharma	BSP	29,240	27.69	21,150	20.02
357	Aligarh	Zamir Ullah	SP	44,541	36.76	Sanjeev Raja	BJP	36,689	30.28	7,852	6.48
358	Koil (SC)	Mahendra Singh	BSP	54,161	39.71	Surendra Sahyogi	BJP	49,926	36.60	4,235	3.11
359	Iglas	Bimlesh Singh	RLD	53,522	40.97	Mukul Upadhyay	BSP	46,822	35.84	6,700	5.13
360	Barauli	Tha Jaiveer Singh	BSP	49,028	38.55	Dalvir Singh	RLD	44,327	34.86	4,701	3.69
361	Khair	Satya Pal Singh	RLD	62,483	48.18	Pramod Gaur	BSP	48,704	37.55	13,779	10.63
Gautam Buddha Nagar District
362	Jewar (SC)	Horam Singh	BSP	46,125	38.77	Bansi Singh	INC	40,491	34.03	5,634	4.74
Bulandshahr District
363	Khurja	Anil Kumar	BSP	37,807	36.95	Ved Pal Singh	BJP	20,737	20.27	17,070	16.68
364	Debai	Shri Bhagwan Sharma	BSP	67,223	51.98	Rajvir Singh	BJP	51,519	39.84	15,704	12.14
365	Anupshahr	Gajendra Singh	BSP	40,478	29.42	Hoshiyar Singh	IND	30,013	21.81	10,465	7.61
366	Siana	Sunder Singh	BJP	33,252	25.44	Imtiyaz	INC	28,995	22.18	4,257	3.26
367	Agota	Virendra Singh	BJP	35,403	30.27	Kiranpal Singh	SP	32,850	28.09	2,553	2.18
368	Bulandshahr	Mo. Aleem Khan	BSP	39,571	29.84	Mahendra Yadav	SP	36,398	27.45	3,173	2.39
369	Shikarpur (SC)	Vasdev Singh	BSP	30,418	29.19	Bhola Singh	RLD	26,144	25.09	4,274	4.10
370	Sikandrabad	Vedram Bhati	BSP	48,897	34.38	Narendra Singh Bhati	SP	38,679	27.19	10,218	7.19
Gautam Buddha Nagar District
371	Dadri	Satveer Singh Gurjar	BSP	75,346	32.50	Nawab Singh Nagar	BJP	50,923	21.96	24,423	10.54
Ghaziabad District
372	Ghaziabad	Sunil Kumar Sharma	BJP	88,506	30.23	Suresh Bansal	BSP	62,851	21.47	25,655	8.76
373	Muradnagar	Rajpal Tyagi	IND	37,796	27.67	Wahab	BSP	34,776	25.46	3,020	2.21
374	Modinagar	Rajpal Singh	BSP	32,434	21.26	Dharmesh Singh Tomer	SP	31,155	20.42	1,279	0.84
375	Hapur (SC)	Dharam Pal	BSP	39,802	32.76	Gajraj Singh	INC	30,357	24.98	9,445	7.78
376	Garhmukteshwar	Madan Chouhan	SP	45,606	32.93	Ram Naresh	BJP	38,296	27.65	7,310	5.28
Meerut District
377	Kithore	Shahid Manzoor	SP	43,701	32.82	Vijendra Singh	BSP	40,276	30.24	3,425	2.58
378	Hastinapur (SC)	Yogesh Verma	BSP	34,200	28.44	Gopal Kali	INC	27,174	22.60	7,026	5.84
379	Sardhana	Chandra Veer Singh	BSP	37,469	26.83	Tabassum Begum	RLD	28,134	20.15	9,335	6.68
380	Meerut Cantonment	Satyaprakash Agarwal	BJP	56,800	40.26	Sunil Wadhwa	BSP	40,621	28.79	16,179	11.47
381	Meerut	Haji Yaqub	UPUDF	48,502	35.50	Lakshmikant Vajpeyee	BJP	47,413	34.70	1,089	0.80
382	Kharkhauda	Lakhirram Nagar	BSP	62,464	42.75	Haji Yaqub	UPUDF	35,045	23.99	27,419	18.76
383	Siwalkhas (SC)	Vinod Harit	BSP	42,171	32.52	Narendra Singh	RLD	24,705	19.05	17,466	13.47
Baghpat District
384	Khekra	Madan Bhaiya	RLD	63,469	27.35	Ch. Kartar Singh	BSP	51,934	22.38	11,535	4.97
385	Baghpat	Kaukab Hameed Khan	RLD	38,169	33.25	Sahab Singh	SP	36,636	31.92	1,533	1.33
386	Barnawa	Satyandra	RLD	33,730	29.59	Samarpal Singh	SP	31,802	27.89	1,928	1.70
387	Chaprauli	Dr. Ajay Tomar	RLD	47,487	49.56	Gajendra Munna	BSP	32,059	33.46	15,428	16.10
Muzaffarnagar District
388	Kandhla	Balveer	BSP	52,725	42.79	Virendra Singh	RLD	33,949	27.55	18,776	15.24
389	Khatauli	Yograj Singh	BSP	38,205	31.67	Rajpal Singh	RLD	22,184	18.39	16,021	13.28
390	Jansath (SC)	Yashwant	BSP	43,623	37.92	Prakash Chand	BJP	26,450	23.00	17,173	14.92
391	Morna	Kadir Rana	RLD	43,929	36.88	Rajpal Saini	BSP	38,947	32.70	4,982	4.18
392	Muzaffarnagar	Ashok Kumar Kansal	BJP	49,817	31.78	Chitranjan Swaroop	SP	38,556	24.60	11,261	7.18
393	Charthawal (SC)	Anil Kumar	BSP	35,417	30.80	Rampal Singh	BJP	33,544	29.18	1,873	1.62
394	Baghra	Pankaj Kumar	INC	37,649	31.28	Yashpal Singh	RLD	26,188	21.76	11,461	9.52
395	Kairana	Hukum Singh	BJP	53,483	38.45	Arshad	RLD	44,983	32.34	8,500	6.11
396	Thana Bhawan	Abdul Warish Khan	RLD	41,204	30.36	Anoop Singh	BSP	35,801	26.38	5,403	3.98
Saharanpur District
397	Nakur	Mahipal Singh	BSP	71,246	41.59	Pradeep Kumar	SP	50,808	29.66	20,438	11.93
398	Sarsawa	Dharm Saini	BSP	68,440	41.33	Moh. Dilshad	SP	31,767	19.19	36,673	22.14
399	Nagal (SC)	Ravindar Kumar	BSP	61,323	45.36	Vishv Dayal	SP	38,424	28.42	22,899	16.94
400	Deoband	Manoj Chaudhary	BSP	53,577	36.49	Shashi Bala Pundir	BJP	36,116	24.60	17,461	11.89
401	Harora (SC)	Jagpal	BSP	82,343	49.66	Vimla Rakesh	SP	52,189	31.47	30,154	18.19
402	Saharanpur	Raghav Lakhan Pal	BJP	76,049	47.72	Sanjay Garg	SP	57,858	36.30	18,191	11.42
403	Muzaffarabad	Imran Masood	IND	43,835	28.14	Jagdish Rana	SP	40,152	25.77	3,683	2.37
