= Hamirpur, Uttar Pradesh Assembly constituency =

Constituency of the Uttar Pradesh legislative assembly in India

Coordinates: 25.96°N 80.15°E

Hamirpur
- Constituency No. 228 for the Uttar Pradesh Legislative Assembly

Constituency details
- Country: India
- Region: North India
- State: Uttar Pradesh
- District: Hamirpur
- Total electors: 4,12,700
- Reservation: None

Member of Legislative Assembly
- 18th Uttar Pradesh Legislative Assembly
- Incumbent Manoj Kumar Prajapati
- Party: Bharatiya Janata Party
- Elected year: 2022
- Preceded by: Yuvraj Singh

Hamirpur is a constituency of the Uttar Pradesh Legislative Assembly covering the city of Hamirpur in the Hamirpur district of Uttar Pradesh, India.

Hamirpur is one of five assembly constituencies in the Hamirpur Lok Sabha constituency. Since 2008, this assembly constituency is numbered 228 amongst 403 constituencies.

== Members of Legislative Assembly ==
Year	Member	Party
1957	Surendra Dutt Bajpai	Indian National Congress
1962	Surendra Dutt Bajpai	Indian National Congress
1967	Bajrang Bali Brahmachari	Bharatiya Jana Sangh
1969	Pratap Narain	Indian National Congress
1974	Pratap Narain	Indian National Congress
1977	Onkar Nath	Janata Party
1980	Pratap Narain	Indian National Congress (I)
1985	Jagdish Narain	Indian National Congress
1989	Ashok Singh Chandel	Independent
1991	Shivcharan Prajapati	Bahujan Samaj Party
1993	Ashok Singh Chandel	Janata Dal
1996	Shivcharan Prajapati	Bahujan Samaj Party
2002	Shivcharan Prajapati	Bahujan Samaj Party
2007	Ashok Singh Chandel	Samajwadi Party
2012	Niranjan Jyoti	Bharatiya Janata Party
2014^	Shivcharan Prajapati	Samajwadi Party
2017	Ashok Singh Chandel	Bharatiya Janata Party
2019^	Yuvraj Singh	Bharatiya Janata Party
2022	Manoj Kumar Prajapati	Bharatiya Janata Party

- ^ By Election

== Election results ==
=== 2027 ===
2027 Uttar Pradesh Legislative Assembly election: Hamirpur
Party	Candidate	Votes	%	±%
INDIA				
NDA				
BSP				
NOTA	None of the above			
Majority				
Turnout				
gain from		Swing		

=== 2022 ===
2022 Uttar Pradesh Legislative Assembly election: Hamirpur
Party	Candidate	Votes	%	±%
BJP	Manoj Kumar Prajapati	105,432	40.14	+1.59
SP	Ram Prakash Prajapati	79,947	30.44	+1.15
BSP	Ram Phool Nishad	47,299	18.01	+3.09
INC	Raj Kumari Singh Chandel	16,437	6.26	−2.08
Jan Adhikar Party	Vijay Dwivedi Advocate	4,204	1.6	+1.27
CPI	Jamal Alam Mansoori	3,009	1.15	−0.88
NOTA	None of the above	2,459	0.94	−0.25
Majority		25,485	9.7	+0.44
Turnout		262,674	63.65	+15.64
BJP hold		Swing		

=== 2019 bypoll ===
By-election, 2019: Hamirpur
Party	Candidate	Votes	%	±%
BJP	Yuwraj Singh	74,409	38.55	−5.35
SP	Manoj Kumar Prajapati	56,542	29.29	+4.65
BSP	Naushad Ali	28,798	14.92	−9.05
INC	Hardeepak Nishad	16,097	8.34	
JAP(L)	Raja Bhaiya	5,201	2.69	
CPI	Jamal Alam Mansoori	3,910	2.03	
Rashtriya Shoshit Samaj Party	Sukhapal Singh Pal	2,582	1.34	
NOTA	None of the above	2,294	1.19	−0.16
Majority		17,867	9.26	−10.00
Turnout		193,037	48.01	−15.61
BJP hold		Swing		

=== 2017 ===
2017 Uttar Pradesh Legislative Assembly election: Hamirpur
Party	Candidate	Votes	%	±%
BJP	Ashok Kumar Singh Chandel	110,888	43.9	
SP	Manoj Kumar Prajapati	62,233	24.64	
BSP	Sanjeev Kumar	60,543	23.97	
NISHAD	Anuddin (Maulana Khan)	8,513	3.37	
NOTA	None of the above	3,356	1.35	
Majority		48,655	19.26	
Turnout		252,606	63.62	
