= Rath Assembly constituency =

Constituency of the Uttar Pradesh legislative assembly in India

Coordinates: 25.60°N 79.56°E

Rath
- Constituency No. 229 for the Uttar Pradesh Legislative Assembly

Constituency details
- Country: India
- Region: North India
- State: Uttar Pradesh
- District: Hamirpur
- Total electors: 3,99,594
- Reservation: SC

Member of Legislative Assembly
- 18th Uttar Pradesh Legislative Assembly
- Incumbent Manisha Anuragi
- Party: Bharatiya Janta Party
- Elected year: 2022

Rath is a constituency of the Uttar Pradesh Legislative Assembly covering the city of Rath in the Hamirpur district of Uttar Pradesh, India.

Rath is one of five assembly constituencies in the Hamirpur Lok Sabha constituency. Since 2008, this assembly constituency is numbered 229 amongst 403 constituencies.

== Members of the Legislative Assembly ==
| Year | Member | Party |
|---|---|---|
| 1952 | Sripat Sahai | Indian National Congress |
| 1957 | Doonger Singh | Indian National Congress |
| 1962 | Doonger Singh | Indian National Congress |
| 1967 | Ram Sri Rajput | Bharatiya Jana Sangh |
| 1969 | Swami Prasad Singh | Indian National Congress |
| 1974 | Swami Prasad Singh | Indian National Congress |
| 1977 | Bal Krishna | Janata Party |
| 1980 | Swami Prasad Singh | Indian National Congress (I) |
| 1985 | Doonger Singh | Indian National Congress |
| 1987^ | Ram Singh | Indian National Congress |
| 1989 | Rajender Singh | Janata Dal |
| 1991 | Ram Singh | Indian National Congress |
| 1993 | Dhooram Lodhi | Bahujan Samaj Party |
| 1996 | Ramadhar Singh | Samajwadi Party |
| 2002 | Dhooram Lodhi | Bahujan Samaj Party |
| 2007 | Dhooram Lodhi | Bahujan Samaj Party |
| 2012 | Gayadeen Anuragi | Indian National Congress |
| 2017 | Manisha Anuragi | Bharatiya Janata Party |
| 2022 | Manisha Anuragi | Bharatiya Janata Party |

== Election results ==
=== 2027 ===
2027 Uttar Pradesh Legislative Assembly election: Rath
| Party | Candidate | Votes | % | ±% |
|---|---|---|---|---|
| INDIA | | | | |
| NDA | | | | |
| BSP | | | | |
| NOTA | None of the above | | | |
| Majority | | | | |
| Turnout | | | | |
| gain from | | Swing | | |

=== 2022 ===
2022 Uttar Pradesh Legislative Assembly Election: Rath
| Party | Candidate | Votes | % | ±% |
|---|---|---|---|---|
| BJP | Manisha | 139,373 | 53.79 | −7.17 |
| SP | Chandrawati Verma | 77,394 | 29.87 | |
| BSP | Prasanna Bhushan | 24,266 | 9.37 | −6.63 |
| INC | Kamlesh Kumar Verma | 5,164 | 1.99 | −15.73 |
| Bharatiya Shakti Chetna Party | Dharmendra Singh Gautam | 3,021 | 1.17 | |
| NOTA | None of the above | 4,268 | 1.65 | −0.29 |
| Majority | | 619,079 | 23.92 | −19.32 |
| Turnout | | 259,108 | 64.84 | +1.69 |
| BJP hold | | Swing | | |

=== 2017 ===
Uttar Pradesh Legislative Assembly election, 2017: Rath
| Party | Candidate | Votes | % | ±% |
|---|---|---|---|---|
| BJP | Manisha Anuragi | 147,526 | 60.96 | |
| INC | Gayadeen Anuragi | 42,883 | 17.72 | |
| BSP | Anil Kumar Ahirwar | 38,710 | 16.0 | |
| Jan Adhikar Party | Ajit Kumar | 3,083 | 1.27 | |
| Independent | Gangotri | 2,334 | 0.96 | |
| NOTA | None of the above | 4,595 | 1.94 | |
| Majority | | 104,643 | 43.24 | |
| Turnout | | 242,011 | 63.15 | |
| BJP gain from INC | | Swing | +20.48 | |
