= Patyora =

- Village
- Location in Uttar Pradesh, India Patyora (India)
- Coordinates: 25.916°N 80.240°E
- Country: India
- State: Uttar Pradesh
- Admin. division: Chitrakoot
- District: Hamirpur
- Time zone: UTC+05:30 (IST)
- Official language: Hindi, English, Urdu

Patyora is a village in Hamirpur district, Uttar Pradesh, India.

== Geography and climate ==
The village of Patyora is situated in Central Uttar Pradesh on a plain of the Vindhya Range and plateau region in the northern spout of India, not so far from the northern boundary with Nepal and the Himalayas. Cultivation is intensive with fertile and rich soila, and well-developed irrigation systems.

It has a humid subtropical climate and experiences four seasons. The winter starts in January through February and is followed by the summer, between March and May, and by the monsoon season, between June and September. Summers are extreme with temperatures fluctuating between 0 to 50 °C (32 to 122 °F). The mean annual rainfall is around 650 millimetres (26 in). Primarily a summer phenomenon, the Bay of Bengal branch of the Indian monsoon from south-east is the major bearer of rain. North-eastern monsoons also contribute small quantities towards the overall precipitation.
