= Manoolal Dwivedi =

Indian politician

Member of Parliament, Lok Sabha
- In office 1952-1967
- Succeeded by: Swami Brahmanand
- Constituency: Hamirpur, Uttar Pradesh

Personal details
- Born: 5 July 1908 Charkhari, Hamirpur, United Provinces, British India (present-day Uttar Pradesh, India)
- Party: Indian National Congress

Manoolal Dwivedi was an Indian politician. He was elected to the Lok Sabha, the lower house of the Parliament of India from Hamirpur as a member of the Indian National Congress.
