= National Highway 34 (India) =

National highway in India

- Map of National Highway 34 in red

Route information
- Length: 1,426 km (886 mi)

Major junctions
- North end: Gangotri Dham, Uttarakhand
- List: NH 7 in Virbhadra, Uttarakhand; NE 3 in Meerut, Uttar Pradesh; NE 2 in Duhai, Uttar Pradesh; NH 9 in Ghaziabad, Uttar Pradesh; NE 2 in Beel Akbarpur, Uttar Pradesh; NH 21 in Sikandra Rao, Uttar Pradesh; NH 19 / NH 27 in Kanpur, Uttar Pradesh; NH 35 in Kabrai, Uttar Pradesh; NH 76 in Mahoba, Uttar Pradesh; NH 39 in Chhatarpur, Madhya Pradesh; NH 43 in Gulganj, Madhya Pradesh; NH 30 / NH 45 in Jabalpur, Madhya Pradesh
- South end: NH 44 in Lakhnadon, Madhya Pradesh

Location
- Country: India
- States: Uttarakhand, Uttar Pradesh, Madhya Pradesh
- Primary destinations: Bhatwari, Uttarkashi, Dharasu, Ampata, Rishikesh, Haridwar, Najibabad, Bijnor, Mawana, Meerut, Ghaziabad, Bulandshahr, Aligarh, Sikandra Rao (Hathras), Etah, Kannauj, Kanpur, Ghatampur, Hamirpur, Maudaha, Mahoba, Chhatarpur, Hirapur, Damoh, Jabalpur

Highway system
- Roads in India; Expressways; National; State; Asian
← NH 33	→ NH 35

National Highway NH 34 (NH 34) is a National Highway in India. It runs from Gangotri Dham in Uttarakhand to Lakhnadon in Madhya Pradesh, passing through the state of Uttar Pradesh.

== Route ==
Uttarakhand

Gangotri Dham, Bhatwari, Uttarkashi, Dharasu, Tehri, Ampata, Rishikesh, Haridwar - Uttar Pradesh border.

Uttar Pradesh

Najibabad, Bijnor, Meerut, Mawana, Ghaziabad, Bulandshahr, Aligarh, Sikandra Rao (Hathras) Etah, Kannauj, Kanpur, Hamirpur, Maudaha, Mahoba - Madhya Pradesh border.

Madhya Pradesh

Chhatarpur, Hirapur, Batiyagarh, Damoh, Jabera, Jabalpur, Bargi, Lakhnadon (Seoni).

== See also ==
- List of national highways in India
- List of national highways in India by state
