= Maudaha =

- City
- Location in Uttar Pradesh, India Maudaha (India)
- Coordinates: 25.68°N 80.12°E
- Country: India
- State: Uttar Pradesh
- Division: Chitrakoot
- District: Hamirpur

Government
  - Type: Municipal Council
  - Body: Nagar Palika Parishad Maudaha
  - Municipal Chairperson: Raza Mohammad (Srinath)(BSP)
- Elevation: 120 m (390 ft)

Population (2011)
  - Total: 40,003

Languages
  - Official: Hindi हिन्दी
- Time zone: UTC+5:30 (IST)
- PIN: 210507
- STD Code: +91-5284
- Vehicle registration: UP, 91
- Website: hamirpur.nic.in

Maudaha is a city and a Municipal Board in Bundelkhand region, Uttar Pradesh, India. It is also a tehsil of Hamirpur district.

== History ==
Maudaha has roots in the Chandel period and was known as a place associated with "Madhu" (honey).

The historical Badi Devi Temple located in Maudaha was built during the reign of Peshwa Bajirao I in the Maratha architectural style.

Maudaha participated in the elections of 1937 which were conducted under the Government of India Act 1935. In order to organize activities of the Congress in the district Jawaharlal Nehru and Maulana Azad visited Maudaha in 1937.

== Government ==
Maudaha is one of four tehsils of Hamirpur district of Indian State Uttar Pradesh. The town had been recognized as one of the Uttar Pradesh Legislative Assembly's region until 2012. Maudaha is a Nagar Palika Parishad city divided into 25 wards for which elections are held every 5 years.

During the local body elections in December 2017, three Grampanchayats- Sichauli, Ragaul and Fatteh purva merged with the Maudaha Municipality, formally called Maudaha Nagar Palika.

== Geography ==
Maudaha is situated on the banks of the Chandrawal River. Maudaha is located at 25.68°N 80.12°E. It has an average elevation of 120 metres (393 feet).

== Demographics ==
As of 2011 India census, the Maudaha Nagar Palika Parishad has a population of 40,003 of which 21,266 are males while 18,737 are females. The population of children aged 0-6 is 5059 which is 12.65% of the total population of Maudaha (NPP). In Maudaha Nagar Palika Parishad, the female sex ratio is 881 against the state average of 912. Moreover, the child sex ratio in Maudaha is around 868 compared to Uttar Pradesh state average of 902. The literacy rate of Maudaha city is 78.77% higher than the state average of 67.68%. In Maudaha, male literacy is around 86.22% while the female literacy rate is 70.34%.

Maudaha Nagar Palika Parishad has total administration of over 7,152 houses to which it supplies basic amenities like water and sewerage. It is also authorized to build roads within Nagar Palika Parishad limits and impose taxes on properties under its jurisdiction.

Religion in Maudaha Town (2011)
Religion	Percent
Hinduism	57.15%
Islam	42.40%
Christianity	0.19%
Others†	0.06%
Distribution of religions †Includes Sikhs (<0%), Buddhists (<0%).

== Economy ==
The economy of Maudaha is mostly dependent on farming and the region is in a drought-affected area. There is no large scale industry in the city apart from a few small scale industries. The city however, has a growing private commercial sector, mainly retail businesses.

The Maudaha Silver Fish is a traditional, 300 to 400-year-old indigenous metal handicraft originating from Maudaha. It is widely recognized for its unique articulated design and structural flexibility, which allows the metallic fish figurines to mimic the fluid movements of a living fish.

Hindustan Unilever, J.K. Cements, and Rimjhim Ispat Ltd. have factories in Sumerpur, Uttar Pradesh, which is 15 km from Maudaha

== Transport ==
=== Road transport ===
The available multiple modes of public transport in the city are taxis, cycle rickshaws, auto rickshaws. National Highway 34 (India) passes through Maudaha which connects it to Kanpur and Sagar. Bundelkhand Expressway connects it to Agra, New Delhi and Chitrakoot. A district major road MD510B passes through Maudaha which connects it to Banda and Muskara. Apart from the long-distance services, there are many services to nearby places within the state. There are number of daily buses to Kanpur, Rath, Delhi, Sagar, Lucknow, Jhansi, Banda, in Uttar Pradesh and to many other states.

=== Railways ===
Maudaha is served by Ragaul railway station, a station, under the Jhansi railway division of the North Central Railway Zone. It is well connected by trains with cities like Kanpur, Lucknow, Bilaspur, Jabalpur, Raipur, Chitrakoot Dham (Karwi), Mumbai.
