= Hamirpur district, Uttar Pradesh =

Coordinates: 25°45′N 80°00′E

Hamirpur district
- District of Uttar Pradesh
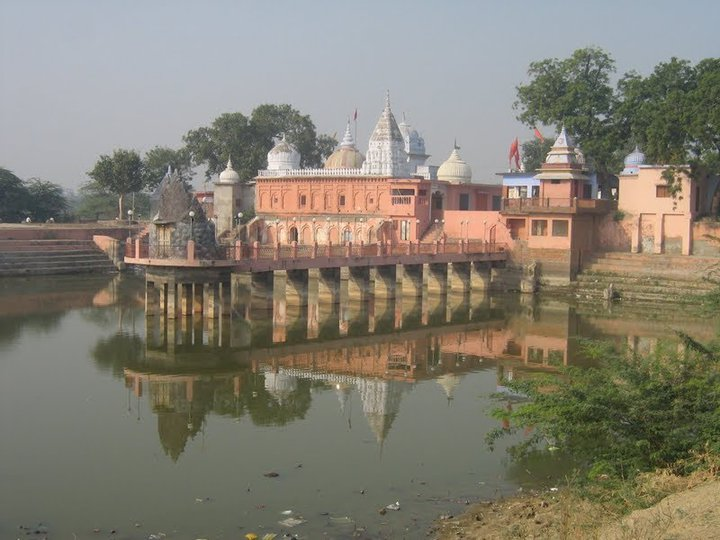
- Temple in Rath

- Location of Hamirpur district in Uttar Pradesh
- Country: India
- State: Uttar Pradesh
- Division: Chitrakoot
- Headquarters: Hamirpur
- Tehsils: Hamirpur, Rath, Maudaha, Sarila

Government
  - Lok Sabha constituencies: Hamirpur, Uttar Pradesh (Lok Sabha constituency)
  - Vidhan Sabha constituencies: 1. Hamirpur; 2. Rath

Area
  - Total: 4,121 km^{2} (1,591 sq mi)

Population (2011)
  - Total: 1,104,285
  - Density: 268.0/km^{2} (694.0/sq mi)
  - Urban: 209,848

Demographics
  - Literacy: 70.16 %
- Time zone: UTC+05:30 (IST)
- Major highways: NH 86
- Website: hamirpur.nic.in

Hamirpur district is one of the 75 districts of Uttar Pradesh state of India and Hamirpur town is the district headquarters. Hamirpur district is a part of Chitrakoot Division. The district occupies an area of 4,121.9 km^{2}. The district has a population of 1,104,285 (2011 census). As of 2011 it is the third least populous district of Uttar Pradesh (out of 71), after Mahoba and Chitrakoot. Two major rivers Yamuna and Betwa meet in the district.

== Demographics ==
Historical population
Year	Pop.	±% p.a.
1901	316,931	—
1911	323,276	+0.20%
1921	309,671	−0.43%
1931	330,690	+0.66%
1941	376,290	+1.30%
1951	386,346	+0.26%
1961	463,768	+1.84%
1971	576,467	+2.20%
1981	689,302	+1.80%
1991	841,438	+2.01%
2001	993,792	+1.68%
2011	1,104,285	+1.06%

Religions in Hamirpur district (2011)
Religion	Percent
Hinduism	91.46%
Islam	8.26%
Other or not stated	0.34%

According to the 2011 census Hamirpur district, Uttar Pradesh has a population of 1,104,285, roughly equal to the nation of Cyprus or the US state of Rhode Island. This gives it a ranking of 417th in India (out of a total of 640). The district has a population density of 268 inhabitants per square kilometre (690/sq mi) . Its population growth rate over the decade 2001-2011 was 5.78%. Hamirpur has a sex ratio of 860 females for every 1000 males, and a literacy rate of 70.16%. 19.00% of the population lives in urban areas. Scheduled Castes make up 21.84% of the population.

=== Languages ===
Languages of Hamirpur district (2011)
1. Hindi (66.4%)
2. Bundeli (32.0%)
3. Urdu (1.29%)
4. Others (0.27%)

At the time of the 2011 Census of India, 66.43% of the population in the district spoke Hindi, 32.01% Bundeli and 1.36% Urdu as their first language.

Tongues spoken in Hamirpur include Bundeli, which has a lexical similarity of 72-91% with Hindi (compared to 60% for German and English) and is spoken by about 7,800,000 people in Bundelkhand.

== Economy ==
In 2006 the Ministry of Panchayati Raj named Hamirpur one of the country's 250 most backward districts (out of a total of 640). It is one of the 34 districts in Uttar Pradesh currently receiving funds from the Backward Regions Grant Fund Programme (BRGF).

Hindustan Unilever, J.K. Cements, Rimjhim Ispat Limited and Hans Metal Limited have factories in Sumerpur town.

== Notable persons ==
- Ashok Kumar Singh Chandel - MLA, BJP
- Pushpendra Singh Chandel, MP, BJP
- Ganga Charan Rajput, Ex. MP
- Vijay Bahadur Singh, Sr. Advocate ( High Court), Ex. MP, Ex. Advocate General
