= Vijay Bahadur Singh =

Indian politician

Member of Parliament, Lok Sabha
- In office 2009-2014
- Preceded by: Rajnarayan Budholiya
- Succeeded by: Kunwar Pushpendra Singh Chandel
- Constituency: Hamirpur, Uttar Pradesh

Personal details
- Born: 22 October 1940 (age 85) Rewa, Madhya Pradesh, British India
- Party: Independent (Externally Supports B.J.P. since 2017)
- Other political affiliations: Bahujan Samaj Party

Vijay Bahadur Singh is an Indian Designated Senior Advocate & former Member Of Parliament & Former Advocate General Of Uttar Pradesh. He was the Advocate General of Uttar pradesh in the Akhilesh Yadav Samajwadi Party Government from 2014 to 2017.He was a member of Bahujan Samaj Party, until 2013. In the 2009 election he was elected to the Lok Sabha from the Hamirpur with 25893 votes.
