= Sumerpur, Uttar Pradesh =

Town in Uttar Pradesh, India

Bharuwa Sumerpur Sumerpur
- Town
- Location in Uttar Pradesh, India Bharuwa Sumerpur (India)
- Coordinates: 25.8170°N 80.1515°E
- Country: India
- State: Uttar Pradesh
- District: Hamirpur

Population (2011)
  - Total: 24,656

Languages
  - Official: Hindi
- Time zone: UTC+5:30 (IST)
- PIN: 210502
- Vehicle registration: UP 91 X XXXX
- Website: up.gov.in

Sumerpur, also known as Bharuwa Sumerpur, is a town and a nagar panchayat in Hamirpur district, Uttar Pradesh, India.

== Demographics ==
As of the 2001 Census of India, Sumerpur had a population of 24,656. Males constituted 54% of the population and females 46%. Sumerpur has an average literacy rate of 59%, lower than the national average of 59.5%: male literacy is 79%, and female literacy is 62%. In Sumerpur, 27% of the population is under 6 years of age.

== Transport ==
Situated at about 15 km from district headquarters, 80 km from Kanpur well connected via NH 34 and 27.Sumerpur is also well connected to some major railway stations as Lucknow, Kanpur, Mumbai, Gorakhpur, Durg, Katni, Ragaul, Banda, Satna, Jhansi, Haridwar, Jabalpur, Chitrakoot.

Nearest airport are Kanpur Airport (domestic) and Chaudhary Charan Singh International Airport.
