= Rajnarayan Budholiya =

Indian politician (1961–2021)

Member of Parliament
- Constituency: Hamirpur

Personal details
- Born: 10 April 1961 Hamirpur, Uttar Pradesh
- Died: 10 October 2021 (aged 60)
- Party: Bharatiya Janata Party
- As of 17 September, 2006

Rajnarayan Budholiya ( Rajju Maharaj ) (10 April 1961 – 10 October 2021) was an Indian politician who served as a member of parliament for the Hamirpur Lok Sabha constituency in the 14th Lok Sabha. He also served as a member of the legislative assembly for the Mahoba Vidhansabha constituency for the 16th legislative assembly of Uttar Pradesh.
