= Pushpendra Singh Chandel =

Indian politician

Member of the India Parliament for Hamirpur
- In office 16 May 2014 – June 2024
- Preceded by: Vijay Bahadur Singh
- Succeeded by: Ajendra Singh Lodhi
- Constituency: Hamirpur

Personal details
- Born: 8 October 1973 (age 52) Mahoba, Uttar Pradesh
- Party: Bharatiya Janata Party
- Spouse: Deepali Singh (m. 1999)
- Children: 2
- Education: Bundelkhand University (M.A, L.L.B)
- Occupation: Agriculturist
- As of 17 December, 2016

Kunwar Pushpendra Singh Chandel is an Indian politician serving as a Member of Parliament in the 17th Lok Sabha from Hamirpur in Uttar Pradesh, from where he was elected for two consecutive terms. He is a member of Bharatiya Janata Party.

== Personal life ==
Chandel was born in Mahoba, Uttar Pradesh on 8 October 1973 to Kunwar Harpal Singh Chandel and Sheel Singh Chandel, along with his 3 sisters Rishika Singh Chandel, Shalini Singh Chandel and Ragini Singh Chandel. His educational qualifications include M.A. (Political Science) and LL.B. He received his education from Bundelkhand University and Allahabad university . Pushpendra married Deepali Singh on 18 February 1999, with whom he has two sons named Yashovarman and Keertidev.

== Political career ==
- May 2014: Elected to 16th Lok Sabha
- 1 September 2014 onwards: Member, Standing Committee on Railways; Member, Consultative Committee, Ministry of Agriculture
- 2 August 2016 onwards: Member, Joint Committee on Offices of Profit
- 1 September 2017 - 25 May 2019: Member, Standing Committee on Finance
- May 2019: Re-elected to the 17th Lok Sabha
- 13 September 2019 onwards: Member, Standing Committee on External Affairs
- 9 October 2019 onwards: Member, Rules Committee and Member, Consultative Committee, Ministry of Defence
