= Lakshmipur, Uttar Pradesh =

Laxmipur is a small town in Maharajganj district of Uttar Pradesh. It is located in eastern Uttar Pradesh. It is known for its first forest tramway of Asia or the Sohagi Barwa Sanctuary.
