= Ajendra Singh Lodhi =

Indian politician

Member of Parliament, Lok Sabha
- In office 2024 - Present
- Preceded by: Pushpendra Chandel
- Constituency: Hamirpur

Personal details
- Born: 9 August 1970
- Party: Samajwadi Party
- Spouse: Rekha Singh (m. 1991)
- Occupation: Politician

Ajendra Singh Lodhi is an Indian politician. He is a member of Samajwadi Party.

== Political career ==
Lodhi has been elected as a Member of Parliament from Hamirpur Lok Sabha Constituency in the 2024 Indian general elections. He defeated Pushpendra Singh Chandel by a margin of 2629 votes.
