= Manisha Anuragi =

Indian politician

Manisha Lekhram Anuragi

Member of the Uttar Pradesh legislative assembly
- Incumbent
- Assumed office 2017
- President: Ram Nath Kovind
- Prime Minister: Narendra Modi
- Constituency: Rath constituency

Personal details
- Born: Manisha; 1 July 1981 (age 44) Jalaun, Jalaun district, Uttar Pradesh, India
- Children: 1 son
- Parent: Brijkishor Varma (father)

Manisha Anuragi is an Indian politician and current Member of the legislative assembly, belonging to the Bharatiya Janata Party and representing the Rath constituency of Uttar Pradesh. In 2012, she won the election of Rath as independent candidate.

== Early life ==
Manisha is a graduate of Bundelkhand University. She obtained an M.Phil. degree after completing her M.Sc., and she planned to become a professor after gaining a Ph.D. While preparing for it in 2010, she got married at the behest of her family to Dr Lekhram Anuragi. Lekhram is posted as a Ranger in the Forest Department and has a Ph.D. Manisha also planned to get the same degree, but Lekhram advised her to enter politics instead.
