= Ganga Charan Rajput =

Indian politician

Ganga Charan Rajput (born 5 May 1960) is an Indian politician from Uttar Pradesh who belongs to the Bhartiya Janta Party.

He was born in the village of Bamohri Kalan Orai, Jalaun district, Uttar Pradesh. He was a member of the Rajya Sabha during 2010–2012 from Uttar Pradesh. He was also elected to 9th, 10th and 12th Lok Sabha from Hamirpur constituency in Uttar Pradesh.
