= Shivcharan Prajapati =

Indian Politician

Shivcharan Prajapati is an Indian politician from Samajwadi Party. He was elected as the MLA from Hamirpur in Uttar Pradesh in 1996 from Bahujan Samaj Party. In 2012, he moved to Samajwadi Party but lost the election to the BJP Candidate. He got into controversy by making a statement where he blamed women for rapes. His son, Alok Prajapti had also been in controversy to get in conflict with district officials for not willing to pay toll at a road.
