= Yuvraj Singh (politician) =

Indian politician

MLA
- In office 1989–1991
- Constituency: Maudaha
- In office 27 September 2019 – 2022
- Constituency: Hamirpur

MLC
- In office 2004–2010

Personal details
- Party: Bharatiya Janata Party

Yuvraj Singh is an Indian politician belonging to Bharatiya Janata Party. He was elected as MLA of the Hamirpur constituency in the Uttar Pradesh Legislative Assembly on 27 September 2019.
