= Hamirpur, Uttar Pradesh =

Hamirpur
- Town
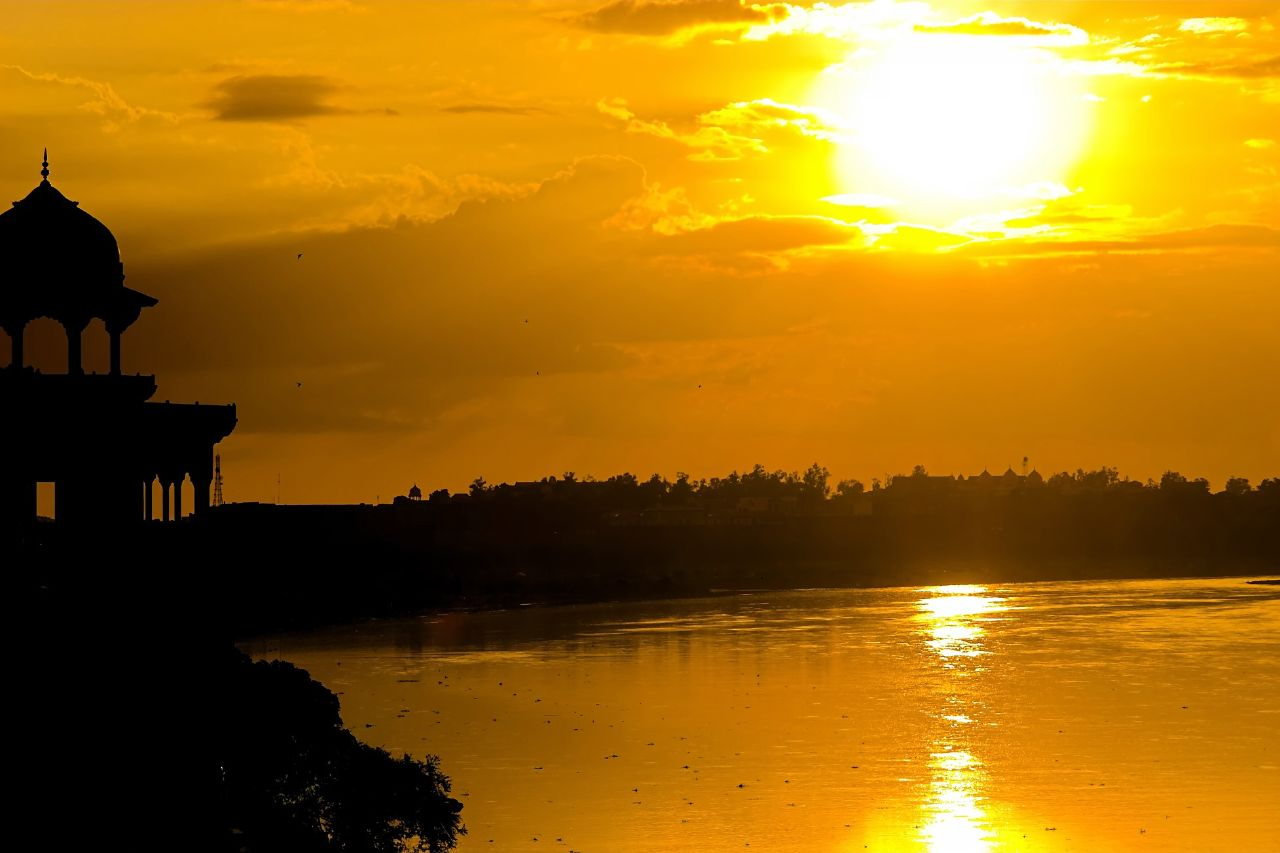
- Yamuna River, Hamirpur

- Location in Uttar Pradesh, India Hamirpur (India)
- Coordinates: 25.95°N 80.15°E
- Country: India
- State: Uttar Pradesh
- Division: Chitrakoot
- District: Hamirpur
- Incorporated: 1937

Government
  - Type: Municipal Council
  - Body: Hamirpur Municipal Council
  - Municipal Chairperson: Kuldeep Nishad (BJP)
  - Lok Sabha MP: Ajendra Singh Lodhi (SP)
  - MLA: Manoj Prajapati (BJP)
- Elevation: 80 m (260 ft)

Population (2011)
  - Total: 35,475

Language
  - Official: Hindi
  - Additional official: Urdu
- Time zone: UTC+5:30 (IST)
- Postal code: 210301
- Vehicle registration: UP-91
- Website: www.hamirpur.nic.in

Hamirpur is a town and a municipal board in Hamirpur district in the Indian state of Uttar Pradesh. Located just above the confluence of the Yamuna and Betwa rivers, it is the administrative headquarters of Hamirpur district.

== History ==
According to tradition, Hamirpur was founded by one Hamira Deva in the 11th century. The town's old fort, which was still standing in the early 1900s, is also attributed to Hamira Deva. Hamirpur was important enough in the late 1500s to be the seat of a mahal, which the Ain-i-Akbari lists as part of sarkar Kalpi.

In 1823, the British moved their collectorate headquarters for northern Bundelkhand from Kalpi to Hamirpur. The town's main market, Sophiganj, was founded by a British officer in 1830 and named after his daughter. The town grew somewhat after its promotion to district headquarters, but it plateaued in the late 1800s and in 1909 was described as "a town of no considerable size".

Hamirpur was promoted to a municipality in 1949.

== Geography ==
Hamirpur is located at 25.95°N 80.15°E, 68 km from Kanpur and 140 km from Lucknow. It is wedged snugly between the Yamuna and Betwa rivers, just west of their confluence. It has an average elevation of 80 metres (262 feet).

=== Climate ===
Climate data for Hamirpur, Uttar Pradesh (1991–2020)
Month	Jan	Feb	Mar	Apr	May	Jun	Jul	Aug	Sep	Oct	Nov	Dec	Year
Record high °C (°F)	30.2 (86.4)	35.2 (95.4)	43.2 (109.8)	46.2 (115.2)	48.2 (118.8)	48.2 (118.8)	46.0 (114.8)	41.0 (105.8)	40.2 (104.4)	39.2 (102.6)	38.2 (100.8)	31.0 (87.8)	48.2 (118.8)
Mean daily maximum °C (°F)	20.3 (68.5)	26.0 (78.8)	33.1 (91.6)	39.6 (103.3)	42.0 (107.6)	39.4 (102.9)	34.1 (93.4)	33.3 (91.9)	34.1 (93.4)	33.7 (92.7)	28.4 (83.1)	22.6 (72.7)	32.0 (89.6)
Mean daily minimum °C (°F)	7.9 (46.2)	12.2 (54.0)	17.5 (63.5)	23.6 (74.5)	27.3 (81.1)	28.3 (82.9)	26.6 (79.9)	25.9 (78.6)	25.7 (78.3)	21.0 (69.8)	14.9 (58.8)	9.9 (49.8)	20.3 (68.5)
Record low °C (°F)	−0.9 (30.4)	−0.9 (30.4)	7.0 (44.6)	11.0 (51.8)	9.4 (48.9)	15.0 (59.0)	16.0 (60.8)	15.0 (59.0)	14.0 (57.2)	9.0 (48.2)	2.0 (35.6)	−1.0 (30.2)	−1.0 (30.2)
Average rainfall mm (inches)	9.0 (0.35)	6.9 (0.27)	9.3 (0.37)	2.7 (0.11)	9.3 (0.37)	62.6 (2.46)	190.6 (7.50)	146.5 (5.77)	104.6 (4.12)	15.9 (0.63)	2.2 (0.09)	4.2 (0.17)	563.7 (22.19)
Average rainy days	0.9	0.7	0.8	0.3	1.0	3.3	9.3	8.4	5.0	1.1	0.2	0.3	31.3
Average relative humidity (%) (at 17:30 IST)	66	54	41	32	33	52	75	79	72	57	59	65	57
Source: India Meteorological Department

== Demographics ==
As of the 2011 Census of India, Hamirpur NPP had a population of 35,475, of which 19,027 were males and 16,448 were females. The population in the age range of 0–6 years was 3,940 constituting 11.1% of the total population. The total number of literates were 26,121, which constituted 73.6% of the population with male literacy of 78.7% and female literacy of 67.6%. The effective literacy rate (of 7+ population) of Hamirpur NPP was 82.8%%, of which male literacy rate was 88.5% and female literacy rate was 76.3%. Hamirpur had 6,802 households in 2011.

As of the 2001 Census of India, Hamirpur had a population of 32,035, of which 17,349 were males and 14,686 were females. The population in the age range of 0–6 years was 4,230, constituting 13.2% of the total population. The total number of literates were 22,592, which constituted 70.5% of the total population, with male literacy of 77.5% and female literacy of 62.3%. The effective literacy (of 7+ population) was 81.3%, of which male literacy rate was 89.1% and female literacy rate was 72.0%.

=== Religion ===
Religion in Hamirpur town (2011)
Religion	Percent
Hinduism	82.5%
Islam	17.2%
Others†	0.3%
Distribution of religions

Majority of the population of Hamirpur are Hindus with 82.5% adherents, followed by Muslims at 17.2%.

== Notable people ==
- Ashok Kumar Singh Chandel, MLA, BJP
- Niranjan Jyoti, Minister of state
- Kailash Vajpeyi (1936–2015), poet, writer and lyricist
