= Chitrakoot division =

Administrative division of Uttar Pradesh, India

Coordinates: 25.2137°N 80.9153°E

Chitrakoot division

Chitrakoot division is one of the 18 administrative geographical units (i.e. division) of the northern Indian state of Uttar Pradesh. Chitrakoot is the administrative headquarters of this division. Historically part of the Bundelkhand region, it includes the 4 districts of:-

- Banda
- Chitrakoot
- Hamirpur
- Mahoba

Until a few years ago, this was a part of the Jhansi division, but due to administrative requirements, this division was established on 21 November 1997. Chitrakoot division is one of the most backward areas of the country, which is full of natural raw materials like moram, ballast, granite etc.

Three major rivers are part of this division:

- Ken
- Betwa
- Yamuna
