= Rawatpura =

Rawatpura may refer to:

- Rawatpura, Kulpahar, a village in Uttar Pradesh, India
- Rawatpura, Bhopal, a village in Madhya Pradesh, India
