= Rawatpura, Bhopal =

Rawatpura
- village
- Location within Madhya Pradesh Location within India
- Coordinates: 23.836162°N 77.3152116°E
- Country: India
- State: Madhya Pradesh
- District: Bhopal
- Tehsil: Berasia
- Elevation: 477 m (1,565 ft)

Population (2011)
  - Total: 580
- Time zone: UTC+5:30 (IST)
- ISO 3166 code: MP-IN
- 2011 census code: 482330

Rawatpura is a village in the Bhopal district of Madhya Pradesh, India. It is located in the Berasia tehsil.

== Demographics ==
According to the 2011 census of India, Rawatpura has 110 households. The effective literacy rate (i.e. the literacy rate of population excluding children aged 6 and below) is 59.48%.

Demographics (2011 Census)
| | Total | Male | Female |
|---|---|---|---|
| Population | 580 | 292 | 288 |
| Children aged below 6 years | 116 | 58 | 58 |
| Scheduled caste | 13 | 6 | 7 |
| Scheduled tribe | 0 | 0 | 0 |
| Literates | 276 | 171 | 105 |
| Workers (all) | 304 | 181 | 123 |
| Main workers (total) | 294 | 173 | 121 |
| Main workers: Cultivators | 291 | 170 | 121 |
| Main workers: Agricultural labourers | 0 | 0 | 0 |
| Main workers: Household industry workers | 0 | 0 | 0 |
| Main workers: Other | 3 | 3 | 0 |
| Marginal workers (total) | 10 | 8 | 2 |
| Marginal workers: Cultivators | 0 | 0 | 0 |
| Marginal workers: Agricultural labourers | 9 | 7 | 2 |
| Marginal workers: Household industry workers | 0 | 0 | 0 |
| Marginal workers: Others | 1 | 1 | 0 |
| Non-workers | 276 | 111 | 165 |
