= Kanpur Dehat panchayats =

The Panchayati raj system is a system of governance. It includes elected bodies at three levels: Village, Block (Kshetra), and District. in the Indian state of Uttar Pradesh. It attempts to enhance participation and more effectively implement rural development programs. Gram Panchayats govern a village or group of villages, Kshetra Panchayats operate at the block level (a group of Gram Panchayats), and the District panchayat at the top level (group of Kshetra Panchayats) in Kanpur Dehat district of Uttar Pradesh, India. The term of each body is five years.

== District Panchayat ==
The District panchayat (jirga) is an elected body. Elections are conducted under the control of the Election Commission of India. The tenure of this local body is five years. The district panchayat of Kanpur Dehat district consists of 10 blocks. Each block contains members according to population. The headquarters of District Panchayat is at district headquarters. Kanpur Dehat district has 33 members. The Panchayat chairman is elected by the members of the district panchayat.

Districts
| District | Name of seat of district panchayat member |
|---|---|
| Sarvankheda | Katethi, Tilaunchi and Umaran |
| Maitha | Ranjeetpur, Aungi, Mawaiya and Bhujpura |
| Rasulabad | Asalatganj, Birhun, Rasulabad first, Rasulbad second and Sunasi |
| Jhinjhak | Jajmuiya, Parjani and Lakshmanpur Pilakh |
| Sandalpur | Sandalpur first and Sandalpur second |
| Rajpur | Rajpur first, Rajpur second and Rajpur third |
| Amraudha | Shahjahanpur, Amraudha first, Amraudha second and Musanagar |
| Malasa- | Kurhwa, Murlipur and Baraur |
| Derapur | Mugisapur, Sithmara and Kapasi |
| Akbarpur | Tigai, Jaganpur and Bara |

== Kshetra Panchayat ==
Kshetra panchayat is a publicly elected legislative body. Elections are conducted under the control of the election commission of India. The tenure of this local body is five years. A total of 808 seats make up the Kshetra Panchayats of Kanpur Dehat district. The headquarters of Kshetra Panchayat is at block headquarters. The head of Kshetra Panchayat is called Block Pramukh and is elected by members of Kshetra Panchayat.

Kshetra panchayats
| Name of Block | Number of members |
|---|---|
| Sarvankheda | 87 |
| Maitha | 91 |
| Rasulabad | 117 |
| Jhinjhak | 73 |
| Sandalpur | 61 |
| Rajpur | 72 |
| Amraudha | 99 |
| Malasa | 73 |
| Derapur | 61 |
| Akbarpur | 74 |

== Gram Panchayat ==
Gram panchayats are elected by the general public. The election is conducted the under control of the election commission of state. The tenure of this local body is five years. After that, citizen charters are scheduled for public convenience. 640 Gram Panchayats make up the district, and ward members of Gram Panchayats number 8050. The head of the Gram Panchayat is called Pradhan and is elected by Gram Panchayat voters by secret ballot.
