= Gajner, Kanpur =

Gajner
- Town
- Location in Uttar Pradesh, India Gajner (India)
- Coordinates: 26°17′0″N 80°4′0″E
- Country: India
- State: Uttar Pradesh
- District: Kanpur Dehat
- Elevation: 129 m (423 ft)

Population
  - Total: 5,000

Languages
  - Official: Hindi
- Time zone: UTC+5:30 (IST)
- Postal code: 209121
- Vehicle registration: UP 77
- Website: up.gov.in

Gajner is a town located 37 kilometres from the city of Kanpur in the Kanpur Dehat district of the state of Uttar Pradesh, India. Gajner is located 11 kilometres from the district headquarters of Kanpur Dehat. Gajner is a connecting link of Kanpur, Ghatampur, Musanagar and Pukhrayan.

== Geography ==
Gajner is located in the doab of the rivers Ganga and Yamuna of Uttar Pradesh. Some parts here are rugged and are not suited to cultivation and agriculture. Gajner is located 129 m above sea level. The Yamuna river is located 17 kilometres south of the city.

Districts located nearby include Akbarpur, Kanpur and jalaun.

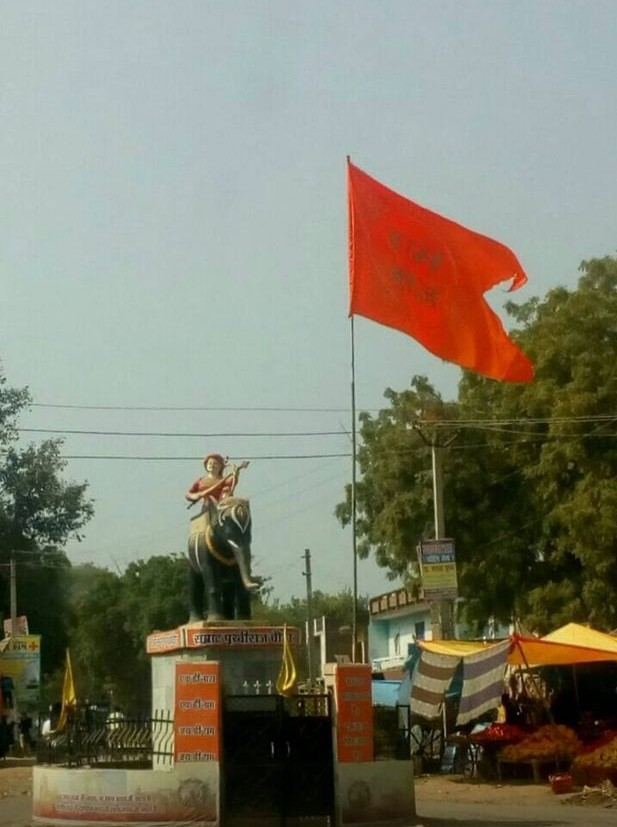
The statue of Samrat Prithviraj Chauhan at Gajner ( Kanpur dehat, Uttar Pradesh) a symbol of bravery & pride.

== Population ==
According to Census Data Gajner has a total population of 6,337 people living in 1,128 houses, with males comprising 52%, and females 48%. The total literacy rate is 60.7%.

== Agriculture ==
Gajner covers an area of 544.98 hectares, including a non-agricultural area of 69.63 hectares and a total irrigation area of 320.15 hectares. Paddy, maize, jowar, wheat, gram, moong, urd, and other green vegetables are agriculture commodities are grown.

== Climate ==
The climate is very tropical with little rainfall. Temperatures range from 8 °C in winter to 40 °C in summer. The monsoon season lasts from mid-June to September. Winters can get very misty.

Climate data for Gajner Kanpur Dehat
Month	Jan	Feb	Mar	Apr	May	Jun	Jul	Aug	Sep	Oct	Nov	Dec	Year
Record high °C (°F)	31.1 (88.0)	35.6 (96.1)	42.8 (109.0)	45.6 (114.1)	47.2 (117.0)	47.3 (117.1)	45.0 (113.0)	40.6 (105.1)	40.0 (104.0)	40.6 (105.1)	36.1 (97.0)	31.3 (88.3)	47.3 (117.1)
Mean daily maximum °C (°F)	23.1 (73.6)	25.9 (78.6)	32.3 (90.1)	38.3 (100.9)	40.7 (105.3)	39.0 (102.2)	33.8 (92.8)	32.9 (91.2)	33.2 (91.8)	33.0 (91.4)	29.4 (84.9)	24.8 (76.6)	32.2 (90.0)
Mean daily minimum °C (°F)	7.9 (46.2)	10.3 (50.5)	15.3 (59.5)	21.4 (70.5)	25.4 (77.7)	27.4 (81.3)	26.3 (79.3)	25.9 (78.6)	24.6 (76.3)	19.6 (67.3)	13.0 (55.4)	8.6 (47.5)	18.7 (65.7)
Record low °C (°F)	1.6 (34.9)	0.6 (33.1)	7.2 (45.0)	11.1 (52.0)	16.4 (61.5)	20.6 (69.1)	21.7 (71.1)	21.7 (71.1)	11.8 (53.2)	4.6 (40.3)	0.5 (32.9)	−0.9 (30.4)	−0.9 (30.4)
Average precipitation mm (inches)	18.7 (0.74)	15.7 (0.62)	8.3 (0.33)	7.4 (0.29)	19.8 (0.78)	99.0 (3.90)	300.8 (11.84)	233.1 (9.18)	188.7 (7.43)	53.8 (2.12)	5.1 (0.20)	9.1 (0.36)	959.6 (37.78)
Average rainy days	1.9	1.5	1.0	0.8	1.2	4.6	13.7	10.7	6.8	2.1	0.4	0.7	45.5
Source: India Meteorological Department (record high and low up to 2010)

== Culture ==
=== Traditional clothing ===
Women traditionally wear shalwar kameez, gagra cholis and saris. Dupattas are worn to complete the outfit. Men traditionally wear kurtas. Western influences can also be seen in urban centres and rural areas.

=== Cuisine ===
Wheat forms the staple diet of North India and is usually served in the form of roti or chapatis along with subzi (vegetarian curry dishes).

=== Languages ===
The native languages of Gajner are Hindi and Urdu, with most people being bilingual.

=== Festivals ===
People celebrate Holi at the end of winter, on the last full moon of the lunar month Phalgun (Phalgun Purnima in February or March). The second festival of Gajner is Dussehra, where the town holds a fair. The third and biggest festival celebrating in Gajner is Diwali. Diwali is a five-day festival which formally begins two days before the night of Diwali, and ends two days thereafter.

== Communities ==
All the villages near Gajner are predominantly Hindu, with Gajner itself being predominantly Rajputs and including various ethnic groups such as the Kurmi, Sachan, Brahmins, Ahirs, Banias, Dalits and Muslims.

== Communication ==
There is a sub-post office at Gajner.

== Markets in Gajner ==
=== Galla Mandi Gajner ===
A grain/wholesale market (galla mandi) in Gajner town where local traders and farmers buy and sell agricultural commodities like cereals and pulses on Saturday and Wednesday every week.

=== Sabji Mandi Gajner ===
A vegetable market in Gajner for retail and wholesale produce sales.

A major market intersection and general marketplace area in Gajner where shops and vendors are located in all routes Moosanagar-Gajner- Raipur road and Gajner - Nabipur road. These markets serve as local trade hubs for agricultural and daily goods in and around Gajner town in Kanpur Dehat, Uttar Pradesh. Now Gajner has become a hub for furniture & electronics and hardware shop, many bike agencies & electronic Rickshaw agencies are available in Gajner like Honda, TVS, Mahindra, Bajaj and more like that .

== Transport and Connectivity ==
=== Roadways ===
Government public bus and private bus services operate in Gajner. The UPSRTC serve the roadway's buses from Kanpur Central to Moosanagar via Gajner.The travelling time by bus is 1 hour 15 minutes. The town is well connected by four-way roads. Four road tracks run through Gajner.

The first route connecting National Highway 19 at Raipur with Musanagar passes through the centre of the town, covering a distance of 35 kilometres. The second route connecting Mati Headquarter (Akabarpur) to Ghatampur also passes through the centre of the town, covering a distance of 38 kilometres.

=== Rail ===
- Rasulpur Gogumau is the nearest railway station, connecting Jhansi with Kanpur Central. To the west is Paman Railway Station at Paman.
- Tilaunchi Railway Station is on the railway line connecting Jhansi Junction railway station with Kanpur Central.
- Gajner can also be reached from Kanpur Central railway station, with a distance of 44 kilometres.

=== Air ===
Kanpur Airport is a domestic airport that was originally designated for the Indian Air Force in Chakeri, India. A new terminal building is under construction at Mawaiya village with a capacity of 300 passengers per hour and six airplanes at a time.

Airlines	Destinations
SpiceJet	Ahmedabad, Delhi, Kolkata, Mumbai

=== Metro ===
Kanpur Metro is the nearest rail system, currently running in two track, one IIT Kanpur to Kanpur central railway station and second one is running towards Naubasta, Galla Mandi Kanpur, which will be extended to the Kanpur metropolitan area. In Phase 1, 22 metro stations will be built on the Red Line from IIT Kanpur to Naubasta and 8 metro stations will be built on the Blue Line from the Agriculture University to Barra-8.

== Health services ==
Gajner contains a number of health services, including a Government Hospital, Community Health Center Gajner, Gajner NPHC Primary Health Center and Veterinary Dispensary Gajner. Private medical services are also available in rural areas around Gajner.

== Education and research ==
Gajner contains a number of schools, including higher education and medical education

=== Higher Education ===
- Indian Institute of Technology Kanpur (also known as IIT Kanpur or IITK) is a public technical and research university located in Kanpur.
- Harcourt Butler Technical University is a state technical university in Kanpur. HBTU offers its students a wide variety of undergraduate and postgraduate courses.
- Pranveer Singh Institute of Technology is an engineering institute also located nearby.

=== Medical Education ===
- Ganesh Shankar Vidyarthi Memorial Medical College (GSVMMC or GSVM Medical College) is a state-run medical college in Kanpur. Lala Lajpat Rai Hospital (LLR Hospital), which is also known as Hallet Hospital, is associated with GSVM, Kanpur.
