= Chaunrah =

- village
- Location in Uttar Pradesh, India Chaunrah (India)
- Coordinates: 26°9′55″N 79°46′56″E
- Country: India
- State: Uttar Pradesh
- District: Kanpur Dehat

Languages
  - Official: Hindi
- Time zone: UTC+5:30 (IST)
- Vehicle registration: UP-
- Coastline: 0 kilometres (0 mi)
- Website: up.gov.in

Chaunrah is a village in Kanpur Dehat district in the state of Uttar Pradesh, India.

It is located in Amraudha development block of Bhognipur tehsil.

== Transport ==
Chaunrah Railway Station is on the railway line connecting Jhansi with Kanpur. Jhansi-Lucknow Passenger and Jhansi-Kanpur Passenger are among the main trains that pass through this station. To the south-west is Kalpi Railway Station (5 km), the nearest station. Going north, Pukhrayan Railway Station (9 km) is the station next to Chaunrah. Kanpur Central Railway Station is The nearest major railway station. The Station Code is: CNH

== Geography ==
Chaunrah is located at 26°9′55″N 79°46′56″E.
