= Satti, Kanpur =

External image
- Temple
- Kathri Devi

Satti is a village in Kanpur Dehat district in the state of Uttar Pradesh, India. It is in Amraudha block of Bhognipur tehsil. There is a Kathri Devi Temple in the nearby village of Kathri. The town had a population of 7708 as of a 2001 India census, 53% of which are male and 47% of which are female.
