= Rajpur, Kanpur Dehat =

Rajpur राजपुर
- Town
- Location within Uttar Pradesh Location within India
- Coordinates: 26°18′10″N 79°41′2″E
- Country: India
- State: Uttar Pradesh
- District: Kanpur Dehat

Rajpur is a town in Kanpur Dehat district in the state of Uttar Pradesh. The town has various facilities including schools, a hospital, and a market for a normal Indian lifestyle. It is located approximately 17 km west of Bhognipur and 12 km east of Sikandara on NH 2A. It is a development block of Sikandara tehsil. The nearest Railway Station is Pukhrayan with a distance of approx. 20 km and the nearest airport is CCSA, Amaus, Lucknow, approximately 160 km away.

== Demographics ==
According to the 2015 India census, Rajpur had a population of 10,678. Males constituted 53.69% of the population.

== Kos Minar ==
Since old Mughal road (Grand Trunk Road) passes through it, there is a Kos Minar (medieval Indian milestones) in its vicinity and also at Khalaspur. Some of them are protected monuments.

== Baradhaayi (Bailaahi) ==
Rajpur has one of the largest cattle fairs of Uttar Pradesh that is held on each Sunday at the place known as Baradhaayi (Bailaahi). In this fair, cattle (cows, buffalo, bullocks, calves, camels, goats, and sheep) are legally sold or bought by farmers and business men as per government rules.

== Transport ==
Operated by Uttar Pradesh State Road Transport Corporation (UPSRTC), Rajpur Bus Station is a small bus terminal. National Highway 2 passes through Rajpur. Services are available to Akbarpur, Bhoginpur and nearby places. Pukhrayan Railway Station provides the rail connection.
