= Parjani =

- town
- Location in Uttar Pradesh, India
- Coordinates: 26°34′27″N 79°40′45″E
- Country: India
- State: Uttar Pradesh
- District: Kanpur Dehat

Languages
  - Official: Hindi
- Time zone: UTC+5:30 (IST)
- Vehicle registration: UP-
- Coastline: 0 kilometres (0 mi)

Parjani is a town in Kanpur Dehat district in the state of Uttar Pradesh, India.

It is located in Derapur tehsil.

== Transport ==
Parjani Halt Railway Station is on the Agra-Kanpur rail route. It falls on the North Central railway zone. Kanpur-Etawah Passenger and Kanpur-Tundla Passenger are among the main trains that pass through this station. To the south east, Jhinjhak Station (6 km) is the nearest Station. Going north west, Kanchausi (5 km) is the next station. Kanpur Central Railway Station is the nearest major Railway station. The Station Code is: PJY.

== Demographics ==
As of 2001 India census, Parjani had a population of 2,467. Males constitute 54% of the population and females 46%.

== Geography ==
Parjani is located at 26°34′27″N 79°40′45″E.
