= Sikandra =

Sikandra may refer to:

- Sikandra, a suburb of Agra, the location of Akbar's tomb
- Sikandara, a town in Kanpur Dehat district in the Indian state of Uttar Pradesh.
  - Sikandra (Vidhan Sabha constituency), a constituency of Uttar Pradesh Legislative assembly
  - Sikandara, a tehsil or sub division in Kanpur Dehat district of Uttar Pradesh
