= PJY =

PJY can refer to:

- Putrajaya, a federal territory of Malaysia
- Parjani Halt Railway Station, near Parjani, Uttar Pradesh, India
- Pinckneyville-DuQuoin Airport, an airport in Perry County, Illinois, U.S.
