= Asalatganj =

Asalat Ganj
- Gram Panchayat
- Nickname: Ganj
- Location in Uttar Pradesh, India
- Coordinates: 26°41′0″N 79°51′0″E
- Country: India
- State: Uttar Pradesh
- District: Kanpur Dehat

Government
  - Body: Akabarpur
- Elevation: 130 m (430 ft)

Population
  - Total: 10,000

Languages
  - Official: Hindi
- Time zone: UTC+5:30 (IST)
- PIN: 209306
- Telephone code: 05114
- Vehicle registration: UP-77
- Coastline: 0 kilometres (0 mi)
- Nearest city: Kanpur
- Literacy: 85%
- Lok Sabha constituency: Kannauj
- Civic agency: Akabarpur
- Avg. summer temperature: 47 °C (117 °F)
- Avg. winter temperature: 6 °C (43 °F)

Asalatganj is a town in Kanpur Dehat district in the Indian state of Uttar Pradesh.

== History ==
This is one of the older villages of Kanpur Dehat. It has a great connection to great Hindu Vedic history as there is an ancient Shivling is established in Droneshwar Temple which is being connected with Acharya Dron asper Myths popular in Local Hindu community.

It may be seen that hill of debris of old structures are nearby the Temple. Later, it was known as Asalat Ganj (office for revenue collection in the period of British. It owns the biggest market (twice a week) in the whole district. Asalatganj is Gram Panchayat of 24 small villages. Almost 18 villages are joined to one another.

Janta Inter College and Gandhi Faize aam inter college are famous colleges for secondary education. Janta Inter college had been run as a nameless education centre in Raamshala before its establishment in a new building. Another old school in Asalat Ganj was established by Maulvi Chhedi Khan in 1930.

It is well connected by rail and road. The population of this town is about 10,000. The main occupation of the people of the town is agriculture.

== Education ==
- Maulana Abul Kalam Azad faiz e am Mahavidyalaya
- Gandi faiz e am Inter College
- Madrasa Arabia for Arabic Languages
- Janta Inter College
- R D N Mahavidyalaya
- Chedi Khan shamshul qamar Inter College.
- Sarswati Gyan Mandir.
- Madarsa Noorul Quran Uchch Aliya

== Asalatganj Geography ==
Asalatganj is located at 26°41′0″N 79°51′0″E. It has an average elevation of 130 metres (429 feet).
