= Kanchausi =

- Town/Nagar Panchayat
- Nickname: Kanchausi Bazar
- Location in Uttar Pradesh, India
- Coordinates: 26.597907°N 79.634593°E
- Country: India
- State: Uttar Pradesh
- District: Kanpur Dehat
- Tehsil: Derapur
- Named for: Kanchausi Railway Station in town

Government
  - Type: Urban Local Body
  - Body: Nagar Panchayat Kanchausi
  - Chairman: Rajendra Singh aka Raju Singh (BJP)

Population
  - Total: 20,000
  - Density: 5,000/km^{2} (13,000/sq mi)

Hindi Languages
  - Official: Hindi
- Time zone: UTC+5:30 (IST)
- PIN: 206246
- Telephone code: 05683
- Vehicle registration: UP77
- Nearest city: Dibiyapur, Jhinjhak
- Literacy: medium%
- Lok Sabha constituency: Kannauj
- Vidhan Sabha constituency: Rasulabad

Kanchausi is a town in Kanpur Dehat district in the western side of Uttar Pradesh in India. This town has a population of about 20,000 (rapidly growing now) and is located on the main railway line connecting Delhi and Howrah and is on the border between the districts of Auraiya and Kanpur Dehat. The railway station is named as "Kanchausi". The main occupation of people here is agriculture and small business. The education level of most of the people is high but not very high. However, in recently times, the locals are fast realising the importance of education which is established by the fact that there has been a spurt of small primary schools in the area and all of them seem to be doing rather well. There are three or four Inter colleges and one Degree College.

This small place has seen some golden times when it had flourishing business by some entrepreneurs. It used to attract many visitors. However, with time things have deteriorated now.

The place is connected by both rail and road. There are few passenger trains that connect this place with business hub Kanpur and District Headquarters at Etawah. The nearest Airport is in Kanpur.

Kanchausi is a well known place for its serially 4 line at Kanchausi Railway Station.
