= Mulahi =

Village in Uttar Pradesh, India

Mulahi is a small village in Rasulabad, Kanpur Dehat in Uttar Pradesh, India. Mulahi has 4 small sub villages.

- Mulahi
- Nivada
- Karkrapur - Also known as khas gajan
- Bachit pura

== Education institutions ==
- SD International Public School Mulahi
- Primary and junior school in all 4 sub villages available

== Population ==
Mulahi has a population of 2000.

== Temple ==
Few temples are in the village as - Brahma Dev, Mata ka mandir Banipara temple is a famous temple in nearby location.
