= Durrajpur =

Village in Uttar Pradesh, India

Coordinates: 26°20′N 83°01′E

Durrajpur is a village situated at Kanpur Dehat district, Uttar Pradesh, India. The village is 7 km from the sub-district Sikandra and 32 km from sub-district Mati. This village is 90 km from the main city Kanpur. The population of this village is around 900.

== Transportation ==
Durrajpur is very well connected by both roadways and railways. Public and private bus service is available in the village within 5–10 km distance. The nearest railway station is Pukhrayan.
