= Lalpur, Kanpur Dehat =

Lalpur, Kanpur Dehat Lalpur Patepur
- village
- Location in Uttar Pradesh, India Lalpur, Kanpur Dehat (India)
- Coordinates: 26°19′7″N 79°56′53″E
- Country: India
- State: Uttar Pradesh
- District: Kanpur Dehat

Languages
  - Official: Hindi
- Time zone: UTC+5:30 (IST)
- Vehicle registration: UP-77
- Coastline: 0 kilometres (0 mi)
- Nearest city: Kanpur
- Literacy: 50.9%
- Avg. summer temperature: 44 °C (111 °F)

Lalpur is a village in Kanpur Dehat district in the state of Uttar Pradesh, India.

It is located in Akbarpur Tehsil.

== Transport ==
Lalpur Railway Station is on the railway line connecting Jhansi with Kanpur. Jhansi-Lucknow Passenger and Jhansi-Kanpur Passenger are among the main trains that pass through this station. To the south-west is Malasa Railway Station (6 km (3.7 mi)), the nearest station. Going north-east, Tilaunchi Railway Station (6 km (3.7 mi)) is the station next to Lalpur. Kanpur Central Railway Station is The nearest major railhead. The Station Code is: LLR
