= Parmu ka Purwa =

Village in Uttar Pradesh, India

Coordinates: 26°11′N 79°47′E

Parmu ka Purwa is a village in Bhognipur tehsil, Kanpur Dehat district, Uttar Pradesh, India. It is situated on a Grand Trunk Road. The nearest railway station is Chaurah.
