= Waneshwar Mahadev Temple =

Hindu Temple in Uttar Pradesh, India

- वाणेश्वर महादेव मंदिर
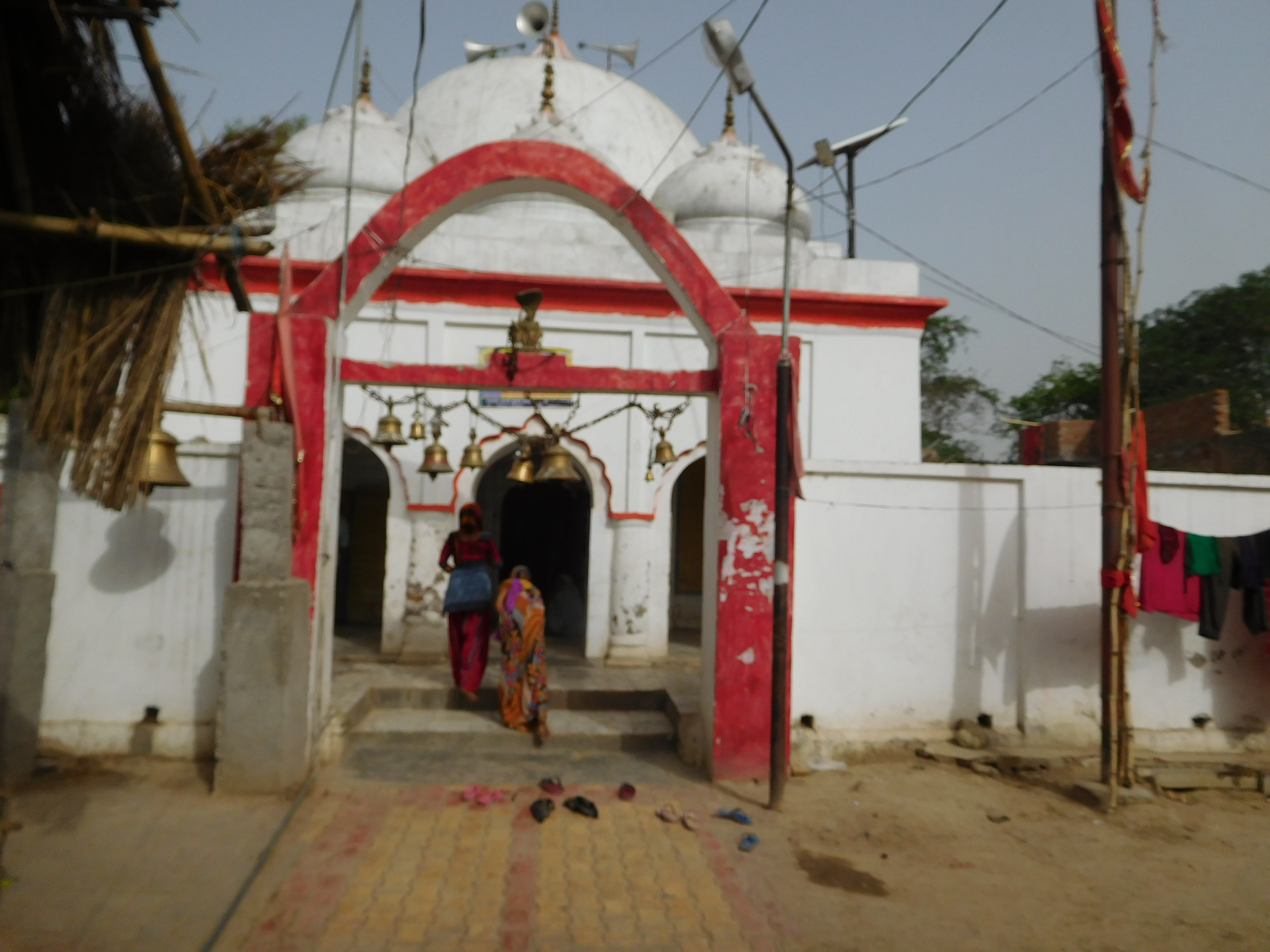

- Location within Uttar Pradesh

Religion
- Affiliation: Hinduism
- District: Kanpur Dehat
- Deity: Shiva
- Festivals: Maha Shivaratri, Savan Somwar (Monday)

Location
- State: Uttar Pradesh
- Country: India
- Interactive map of Waneshwar Mahadev Temple
- Coordinates: 26.48°N 79.89°E

Architecture
- Type: Hindu temple architecture

Waneshwar Mahadev Temple is a temple founded by Daityaraj Wanasur and dedicated to Shiva. The temple lies in the village of Jinayi, in the Derapur subdivision of the Kanpur Dehat district, Uttar Pradesh, India.

== History ==
According to historian Laxmikant Tripathi, Sithaupurwa (Sronitpur) was the capital of Daityaraj Mahabali's son Daityaraj Wanasur. Wanasur founded a huge shivling in this temple. After a war between Shri Krishna and Wanasur the temple was demolished. Janmejay renovated by the son of Parikshit was named Wanpura Janmejay. For some time in Hindi it retained its name of Banipara Jinayi. Near the temple are a pond, Usha Burj, and statue of Vishnu. These are signs that authenticate mythology.

== Transport ==
Rura railway station on the North Central Railway lies 7 km (4.3 mi) by road to the south-east. Ambiapur railway station lies 4 km (2.5 mi) to the north. The temple is also connected by road with Kanpur.

== Ling of Lord Shiva ==
A 50-centimetre (20 in) Ling of Lord Shiva is established on a 1-metre (3 ft 3 in) high base (Argha).

== Fair ==
During Mahashivratri Parv each year, a fifteen-day-long fair takes place. Devotees from the districts of Kanpur Dehat, Jalaun, Hamirpur and Banda worship Lord Shiva of Waneshwar with Ganges water on their return from Lodheshwar (Barabanki).

== Gallery ==
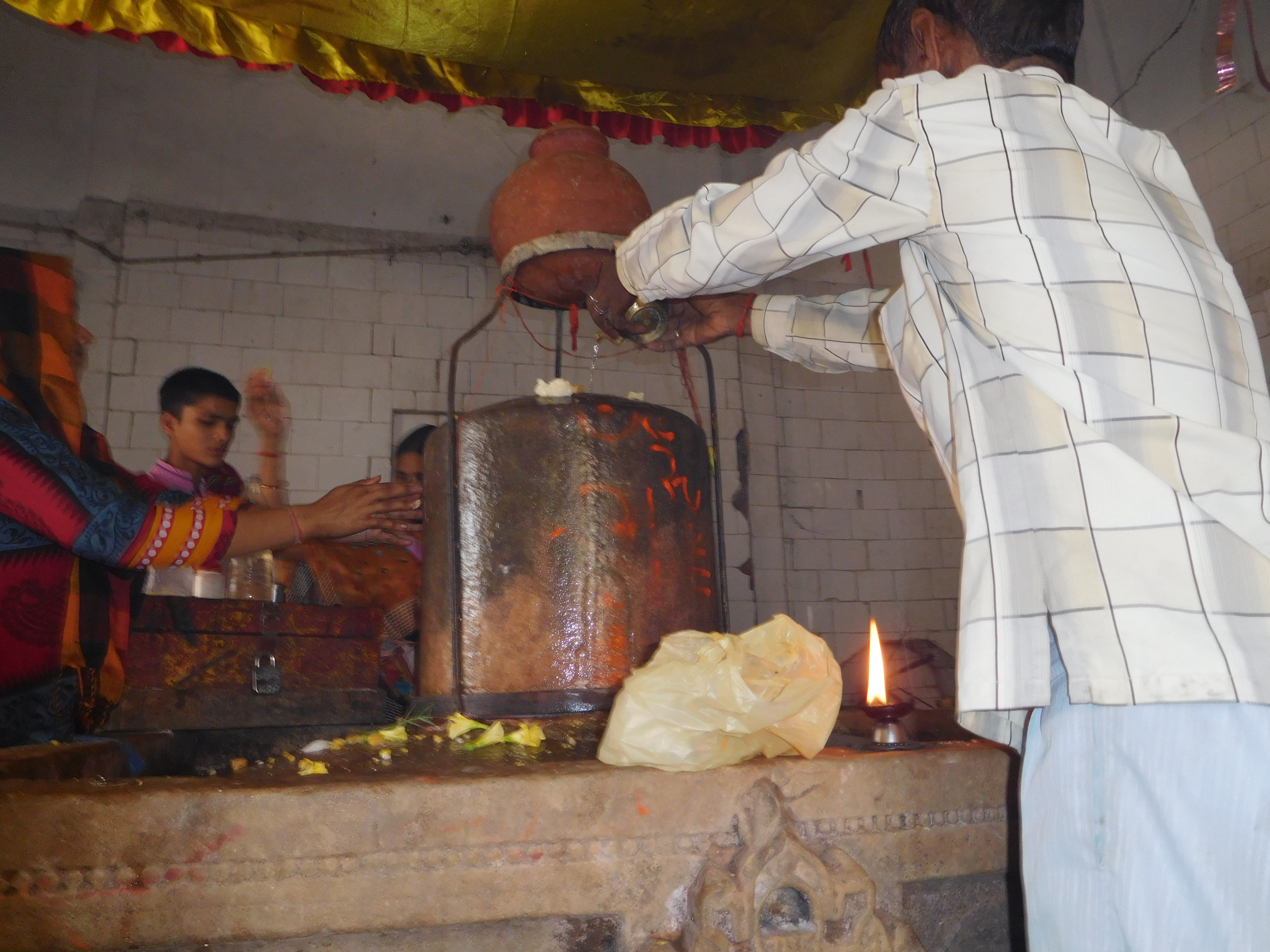
Waneshwar mahadev (internal view),

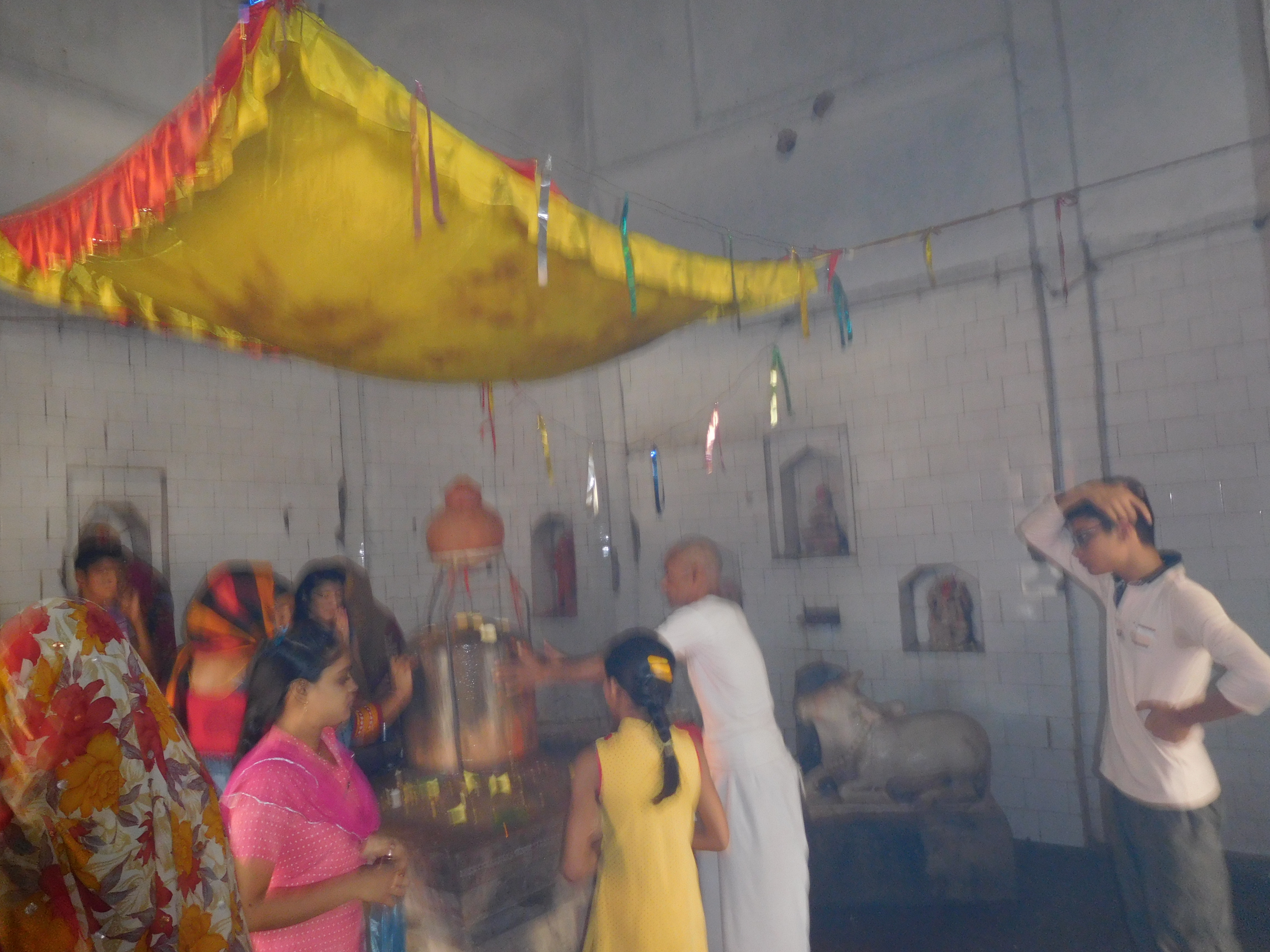
Waneshwar Mahadev Mandir (worshipping view)

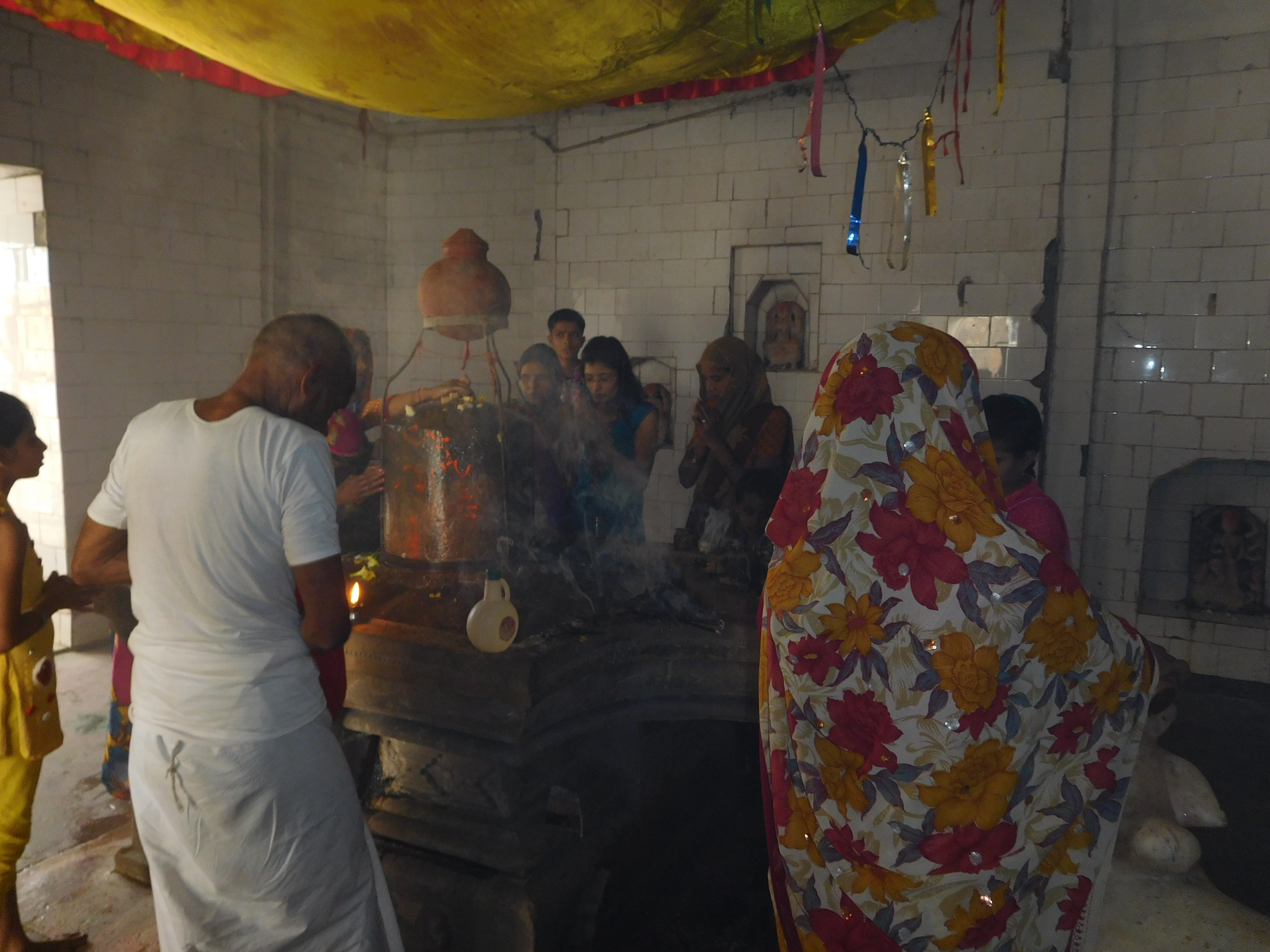
Waneshwar Mahadev Mandir (worshipping view)-1
