= Rasulpur Gogumau =

- village
- Location in Uttar Pradesh, India Rasulpur Gogumau (India)
- Coordinates: 26°22′23″N 80°7′17″E
- Country: India
- State: Uttar Pradesh
- District: Kanpur Dehat

Languages
  - Official: Hindi
- Time zone: UTC+5:30 (IST)
- Vehicle registration: UP, 77
- Website: up.gov.in

Rasulpur Gogumau is a village in Kanpur Dehat district in the Indian state of Uttar Pradesh.

It is located in Sarwan Khera development block in Akbarpur tehsil.

== Transport ==
Rasulpur Gogumau is served by road and rail. Rasulpur Gogumau Railway Station is on the line connecting Jhansi with Kanpur. Jhansi-Lucknow Passenger and Jhansi-Kanpur Passenger are among the main trains that pass through. To the west is Paman Railway Station (4 km), the nearest station. Going East, Binaur Railway Station (4 km) is the station next to Rasulpur Gogumau. Kanpur Central Railway Station is the nearest major railhead.

The nearest airport is Amausi Airport or Chaudhary Charan Singh International Airport (IATA: LKO, ICAO: VILK) with scheduled flights. Although Kanpur City has airstrips along with a full-fledged airport but few scheduled flights serve it.

== Demographics ==
As of 2001 India census, Rasulpur Gogumau had a population of 3,126. Males constitute 53% of the population and females 47%.
