= Roshan Mau =

- town
- Location in Uttar Pradesh, India
- Coordinates: 26°28′45″N 79°59′4″E
- Country: India
- State: Uttar Pradesh
- District: Kanpur Dehat

Area
  - Total: 3.2 km^{2} (1.2 sq mi)

Population (2011)
  - Total: 1,828
  - Rank: 91st biggest village
  - Density: 570/km^{2} (1,500/sq mi)

Languages
  - Official: Hindi
- Time zone: UTC+5:30 (IST)
- Postal code: 209303
- Vehicle registration: UP-
- Coastline: 0 kilometres (0 mi)

Roshan Mau is a town in Kanpur Dehat district in the state of Uttar Pradesh, India. The postal PIN Code is 209303.

It is situated on the left banks of Rindh river and is located in Akbarpur tehsil. Ambedkar park/ BUDDHA park is most famous place in village.

== Demographics ==
As of 2011 India census, Roshan Mau had a population of 1,828. Males constitute 54% of the population and females 46%.

== Geography ==
Roshan Mau is located at 26°28′45″N 79°59′4″E.

== Transport ==
The community has a small railway station.
