= Parhul Devi Temple =

Hindu Temple in Uttar Pradesh, India

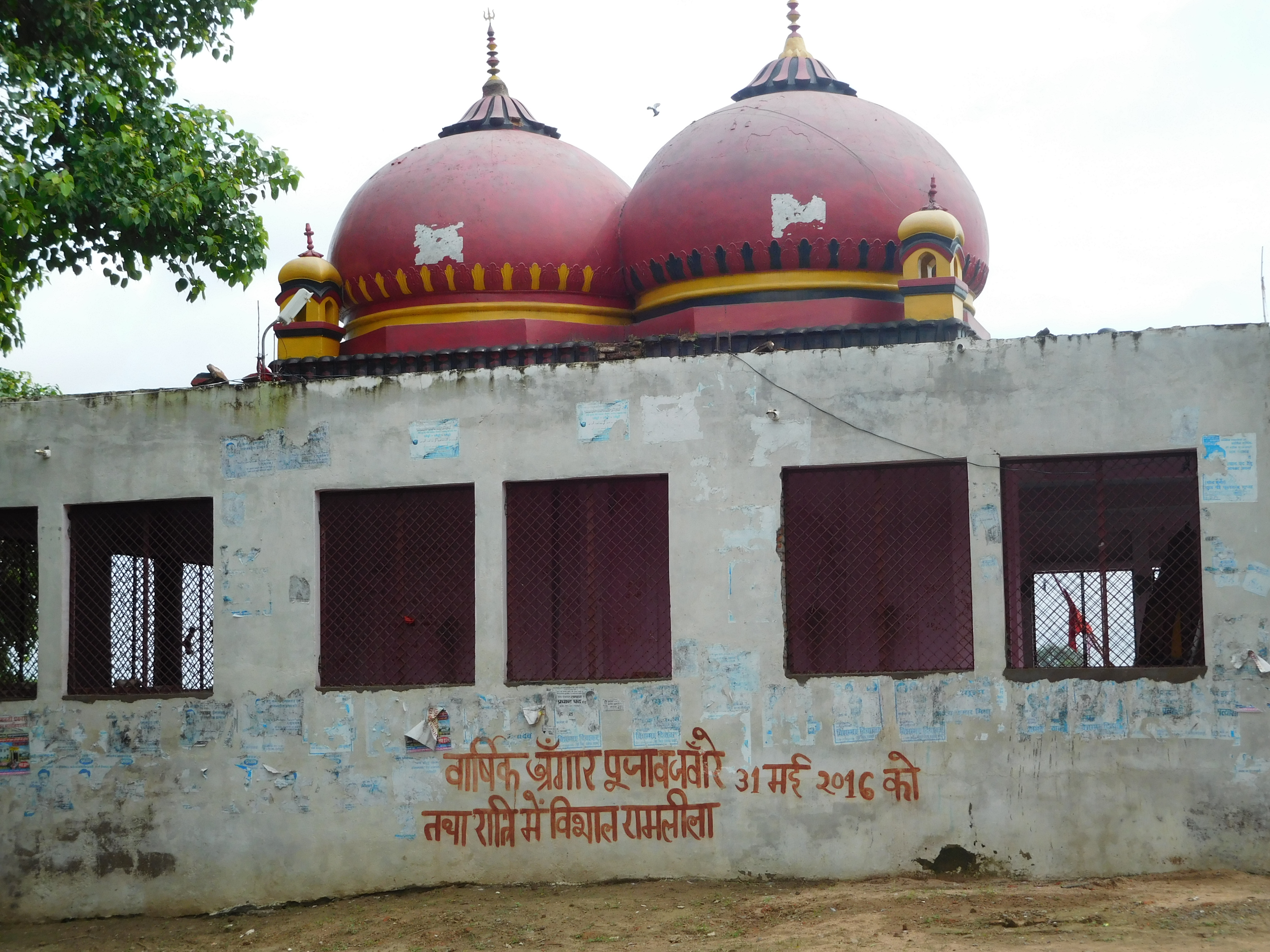

- Location within Uttar Pradesh

Religion
- Affiliation: Hinduism
- District: Kanpur Dehat
- Deity: (Kali)
- Festival: Navratri

Location
- State: Uttar Pradesh
- Country: India
- Interactive map of Parhul Devi Temple
- Coordinates: 26.48°N 79.80°E

Architecture
- Type: Hindu temple architecture

Parhul Devi Temple is a temple to the Hindu goddess Durga in the village of Lamahra in Kanpur Dehat district, Uttar Pradesh, India.

== Location ==
This temple is in the village of Lamahra on the right bank of the Rind River, 3 kilometres (1.9 miles) from the Rura-Shivli road.

== Sculptures ==
=== Parul Devi ===
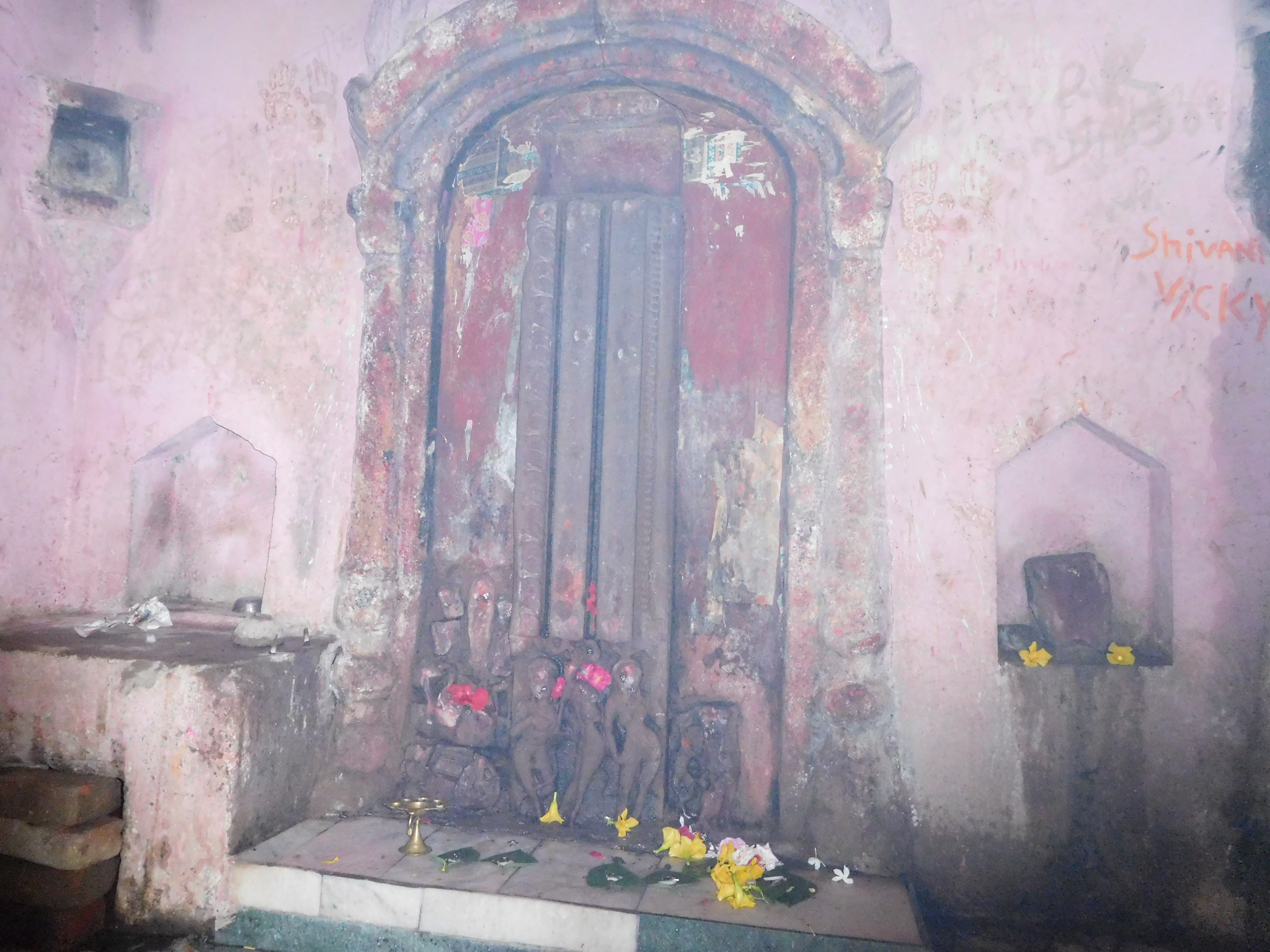
Parhul Devi's statue

Parhul Devi's statue is sitting under a northern dome of the temple complex. Three images of Hindu goddessesare engraved on a stone. The stone is 5 by 1.5 feet (1.52 by 0.46 m).

=== Mahadev ===
Mahadev's statue is sitting under a southern dome of the temple complex. The dome of Parhul Devi and that of Shri Mahadev are identical in shape and size.

== Gallery ==
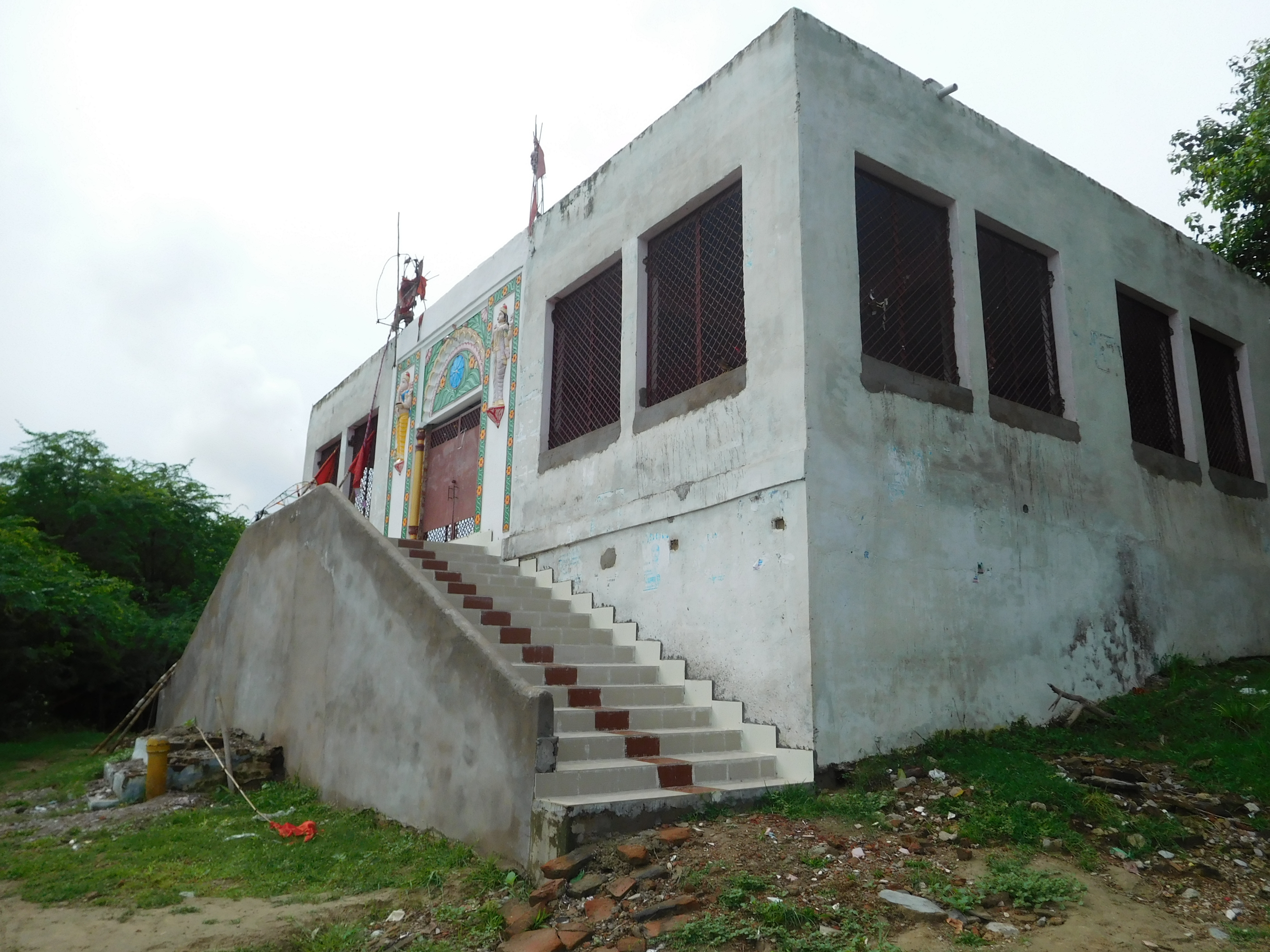
Parhul Devi Temple

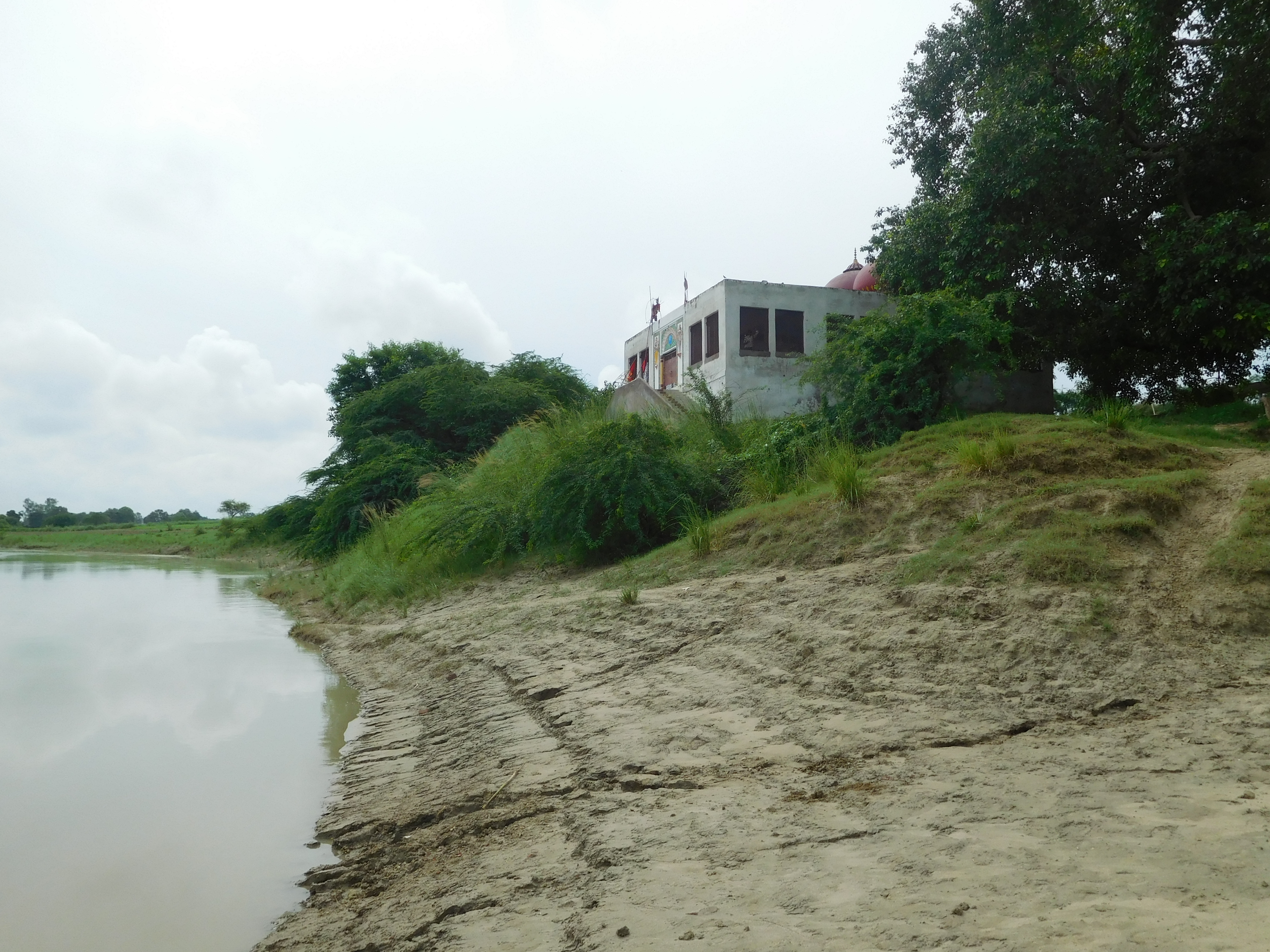
Parhul Devi Temple-1
