= Sikandara =

Sikandara Sikandra
- Town
- Location in Uttar Pradesh, India Sikandara (India)
- Coordinates: 26.44°N 79.59°E
- Country: India
- State: Uttar Pradesh
- District: Kanpur Dehat
- Town Area: 18/09/1997

Government
  - Type: Local Govt.
  - Body: Town Area
- Elevation: 85 m (279 ft)

Population (2011)
  - Total: 13,580

Languages
  - Official: Hindi
- Time zone: UTC+5:30 (IST)
- PIN: 209125
- Vehicle registration: UP 77
- Sex ratio: 53%M / 47%F ♂/♀
- Website: up.gov.in

Sikandara is a town in Kanpur Dehat district in the Indian state of Uttar Pradesh. It is headquarters of tehsil Sikandara.

== Location ==
It is located on NH-2 about 80 km away from kanpur toward west and towards south from Jhinjhak at a distance 20 kilometer. Auraiya city is towards west from Sikandara and Pukhrayan town is toward east. It is also a Sikandra (Assembly constituency).

== History ==
It is said that this township was settled by Sikandar Lodi.

== Geography ==
Sikandara is located at26°22′04″N 79°37′41″E. It has an average elevation of 85 metres (278 feet).

== Demographics ==
Sikandra is a Town and Tehsil in Kanpur Dehat District of Uttar Pradesh. In India, a tehsil is a sub-division of a district that is responsible for the administration and revenue collection of a particular area within the district. It is an important part of the local governance structure, and plays a crucial role in the development and administration of its local community.

According to census 2011 information the sub-district code of Sikandra Block (CD) is 00847. Total area of sikandra tehsil is 509 km² including 504.12 km² rural area and 5.25 km² urban area. Sikandra tehsil has a population of 2,78,754 peoples, out of which urban population is 13,580 while rural population is 2,65,174. Sikandra tehsil has a population density of 547 inhabitants per square kilometre. There are about 51,066 houses in the sub-district, including 2,323 urban houses and 48,743 rural houses.

When it comes to literacy, 64.37% population of sikandra tehsil is literate, out of which 71.62% males and 55.93% females are literate. There are about 210 villages in sikandra tehsil, which you can browse from sikandra tehsil villages list (along with gram panchayat & nearest town information) below.

.
