= Dharau =

- town
- Location in Uttar Pradesh, India Dharau (India)
- Coordinates: 26°23′0″N 79°58′0″E
- Country: India
- State: Uttar Pradesh
- District: Kanpur
- Elevation: 125 m (410 ft)

Languages
  - Official: Hindi
- Time zone: UTC+5:30 (IST)
- Vehicle registration: UP-
- Coastline: 0 kilometres (0 mi)
- Website: up.gov.in

Dharau is a village in Kanpur Dehat district in the state of Uttar Pradesh, India.

== Demographics ==
As of 2001 India census Dharau had a population of 777 Males constitute 55.98% of the population and females 44.02%.

== Transport ==
It is well connected by rail and road.

== Geography ==
Dharau is located at 26°23′0″N 79°58′0″E. It has an average elevation of 125 meters (413 feet).
