= Mawar, Kanpur Dehat =

Mawar
- town
- Location in Uttar Pradesh, India
- Coordinates: 26°18′28″N 79°56′19″E
- Country: India
- State: Uttar Pradesh
- District: Kanpur Dehat
- Elevation: 118 m (387 ft)

Languages
  - Official: Hindi
- Time zone: UTC+5:30 (IST)
- Vehicle registration: UP-
- Coastline: 0 kilometres (0 mi)

Mawar is a town in Kanpur Dehat district in the state of Uttar Pradesh, India.

== Transport ==
It is well connected by rail and road.

== Geography ==
Mawar has an average elevation of 118 meters (390 feet).
