= Sachan =

Indian sub caste belonging to Maratha Kurmi Kshatriya

Sachan is one of the sub-castes within the Kurmi caste in Uttar Pradesh, India. Sachans belong to one of the 96 kul of Marathas, that is Dharmaraj kul. While some claim ancestry from the Bundela Rajput lineage.

The Sachan community belongs to the Suryavansha lineage of Kshatriyas, linking their ancestry to the solar dynasty in Hindu tradition. The term "Sachan" is believed to originate from the Hindi word सचाँदा (Sachānḍā), meaning “बाज़” (hawk or falcon).

The Sachans attained prominence during the Third Battle of Panipat, where they demonstrated their combat skills and strategic ingenuity. Their involvement in this significant confrontation highlighted their prowess as formidable warriors. However, in the aftermath of the Maratha defeat, many Sachans transitioned from the battlefield to the agrarian sphere, redirecting their focus toward agricultural livelihoods while preserving the valorous legacy of their lineage.

During the 1857 Revolt, the Sachans were initially part of the Gwalior Contingent. In contrast to the rest of the Gwalior state army, which refrained from participating due to royal directives, the Sachans defied these orders. Under the aegis of Tatya Tope, they engaged in combat against the British at Masawanpur in Kanpur.Thakur Virbhan Singh Sachan, is venerated as a hero and martyr of 1857 who fought for freedom and local sovereignty. Despite their valorous efforts, they faced defeat and were compelled to retreat to Bhognipur which is now in Kanpur Dehat district, while other units of their regiment were stationed in Ghatampur.

Throughout the pivotal revolt in Kanpur, the Sachans emerged as crucial allies of Tatya Tope and Nana Saheb. Their unwavering commitment to their leaders was evident in their willingness to relinquish their zamindaries in support of the uprising, showcasing steadfast loyalty and determination in the face of adversity. This act not only reflected their allegiance but also played a pivotal role in prolonging resistance against British forces, effectively preventing their incursion into the rural Kanpur region for an entire year following the conclusion of the revolt.

The Sachans migration to Kanpur for administrative purposes, coupled with their establishment in the region's fertile lands after the Third Battle of Panipat, further solidified their ties to Kanpur. Additionally, it is believed that following Peshwa Bajirao II's exile to Bithoor, some Sachans migrated to Kanpur, reinforcing their historical connections to the area.

The Sachans are revered not only as formidable warriors but also as guardians of their land. Their multifaceted history exemplifies a narrative of resilience, martial excellence, and unwavering fealty to their lineage.

== Historical figure of Virbhan Sachan ==
Leader among the Sachan combatants who fought with Tatya Tope and gave up zamindari privileges during the Kanpur uprising.

Contingent Sachan soldiers – As a group, they are recognized for collective defiance and sacrifice during the Gwalior army revolt.

Khanderao Sachan – Said to have served as a Maratha officer in Rohilkhand campaigns (1771 mission).

Baji Sachan – Reputed local commander aligned with Maratha forces in Bundelkhand.

Ganpat Singh Sachan – Guerrilla leader active in the transitional late‑18th‑century resistance against British influence.

Jai Singh Sachan (Raja) – 17th‑century local chieftain known in clan genealogies.

"Sachanda" warriors – Traditional designation for the clan’s early Maratha-era soldiers.; Original name traceable via the Hindi term Sachanda (सचांदा), described in community etymologies.

Rohilkhand mission participants – Collective term for Sachan fighters dispatched during the 1771 Maratha campaign.

Gwalior Contingent insurgents – The broader group of Sachans who rebelled under Tatya Tope in 1857.

== Notable people ==
- Rakesh Sachan

== See also ==
- Awadhiya
- Maratha
- Kshatriya
