= Musanagar =

Coordinates: 26°10′N 79°58′E

Musanagar Gausganj Bazar
- Town
- Interactive map of Musanagar
- Country: India
- State: Uttar Pradesh
- District: Kanpur Dehat
- Established: 1706

Government
  - Type: Chairman
  - Body: Bhartiya Janta Party

Area
  - Total: 10 km^{2} (3.9 sq mi)

Population (2011)
  - Total: 21,991
  - Density: 2,200/km^{2} (5,700/sq mi)

Languages
  - Official: Hindi Secondary English
- Time zone: UTC+5:30 (IST)
- PIN: 209208
- Vehicle registration: UP-77
- Coastline: 20 miles (32 km)
- Nearest city: Kanpur

Musanagar or Moosanagar is a town in Kanpur Dehat district in the Indian state of Uttar Pradesh near the bank of river Yamuna, on both sides of the Mughal Road.

According to the 2011 census of India, the population of Musanagar is 21,991.
