= Maitha =

Maitha Laghu kashi
- Village
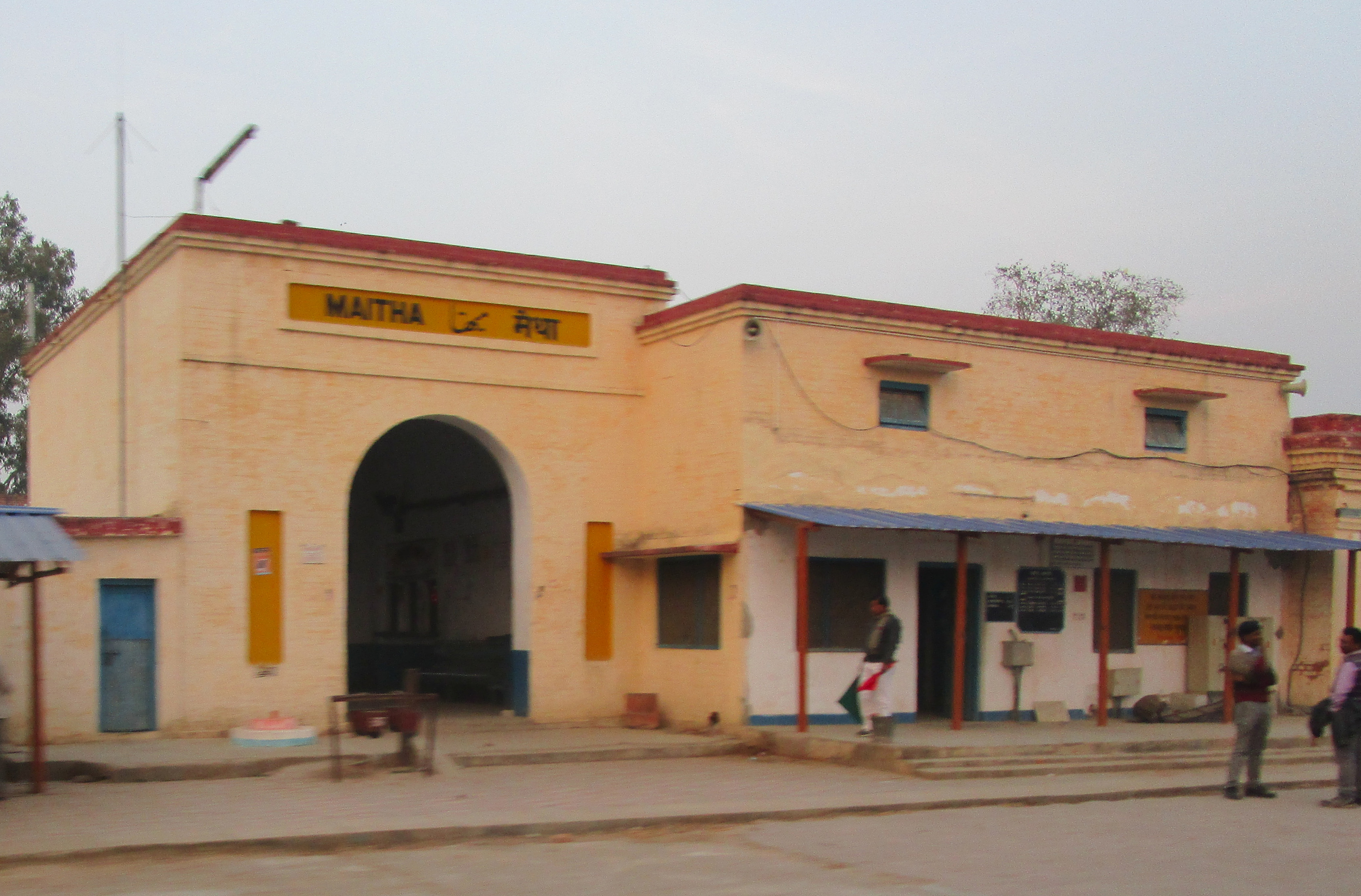
- Maitha Railway Station

- Location in Uttar Pradesh, India Maitha (India)
- Coordinates: 26°28′35″N 80°1′29″E
- Country: India
- State: Uttar Pradesh
- District: Kanpur Dehat

Population (2015)
  - Total: 25,000

Languages-hindi
  - Official-hindi: Hindi
- Time zone: UTC+5:30 (IST)
- 208001,209307 New: 10km kanpur Dehat Airport
- Vehicle registration: UP-77
- Coastline: 0 kilometres (0 mi)

Maitha is a village in Kanpur Dehat district in the state of Uttar Pradesh, India.Maitha is founded new tehsil in Kanpur Dehat district and comes under Kanpur Metropolitan Area

== Maitha Village ==
Maitha village is situated from Maitha Railway Station towards north -east at a distance 10 kilometer. maitha is block.most popular birth place of swami baskranand saraswati and his temple & mata sumbaha devi temple.

== Maitha Railway Station ==
In the name of Maitha is a Railway Station on the route North Central Railway between Kanpur Central and Etawah. The passengers trains are available here towards east to Kanpur and towards west to Etawah. There is also a settlement near Maitha Railway Station. It has shops, schools, petrol pump and some restaurants also.

== Maitha Tehsil ==
Head quarter of Maitha Tehsil is at village Vairi Dariyav. This tehsil has only one development block named Maitha.

HEADQUARTER of MAITHA BLOCK is at village MAITHA

== Transport ==
Bus and taxi are available. Maitha Railway Station to Tehsil head quarter Maitha and village Maitha. Jasvantpur mugra away far 15 km Bus available maitha to kanpur nagar and maitha to rania akbarpur etawah

Cng buses available maitha to kanpur nagar

Maitha to Rania Akbarpur

Taxi available

Maitha to kalyanpur

Maitha to kisan nagar
