= Chaudagra =

Town in Fatehpur district, Uttar Pradesh, India

Chaudagra is a town in Bindki municipal board, Fatehpur district, Uttar Pradesh, India.

Chaudagra is surrounded by the villages of Mauhar, Sai, Harsingpur, Rampur, and Rawatpur . The town is located on Kanpur Allahabad National Highway NH2, 1 km from the Bindki Road railway station and 5 km from the Ganges river. Also Chaudagra is sandwiched between Fatehpur and Kanpur.

Local industry includes Pipes Tubes, Britannia Biscuits, Panem Saria Gurder, and Corpo Electronics.
