= Marhamtabad Airstrip =

Airstrip in Kanpur Dehat, Uttar Pradesh, India

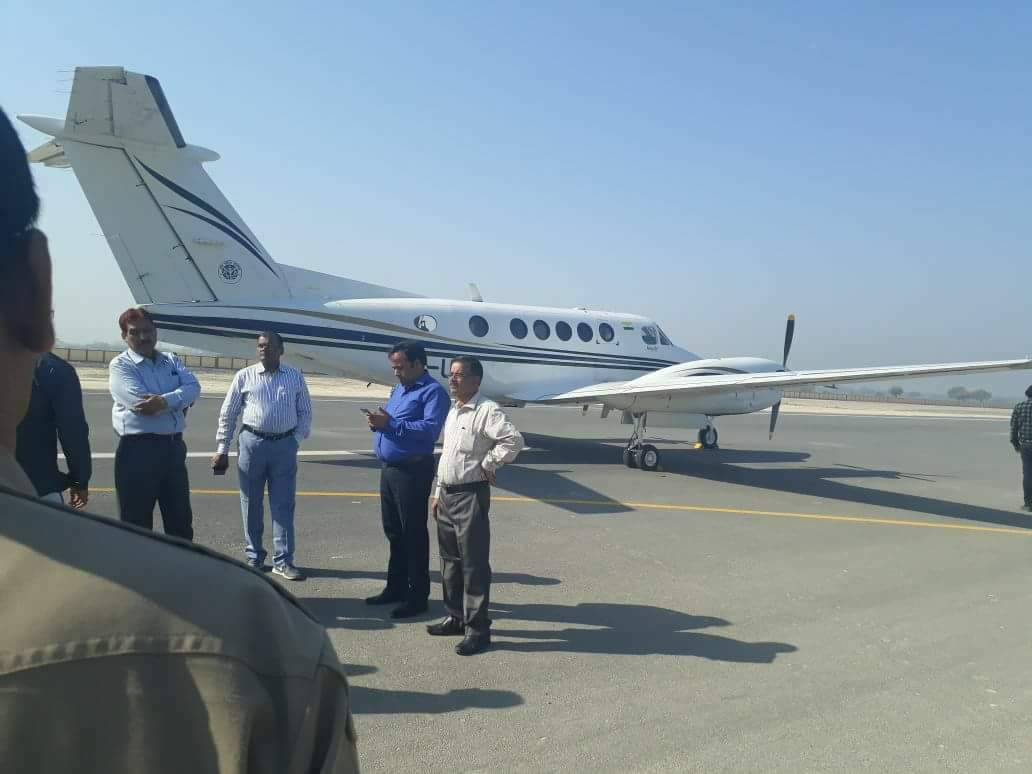
- VT-UPR of Uttar Pradesh Government at Kanpur Dehat's Marhamtabad Airstrip (2018)
- IATA: none; ICAO: none

Summary
- Airport type: Public
- Operator: U.P. Government
- Location: Marhamtabad, Kanpur dehat, Uttar Pradesh, India
- Coordinates: 26.581860°N 79.977667°E
- Interactive map of Marhamtabad Airstrip

Marhamtabad Airstrip is an airstrip situated at Marhamtabad in Kanpur Dehat of the Indian state of Uttar Pradesh. It is owned by the Uttar Pradesh Government.

== History ==
The Airport Authority of India (AAI) requested the Government of Uttar Pradesh to provide a 300-metre-wide and three-kilometre-long piece of land in the Kanpur Dehat district to develop an airport of international standards in 2013. The project was approved in 2015 when the Civil Aviation Department of Uttar Pradesh granted the permission to set up an airstrip at Marahmatabad village near Shivli. The construction work of the airstrip was completed by 2018 and trial run of an aeroplane was done by civil aviation department in 2018.

== See also ==
- Airports in Delhi NCR with scheduled commercial flights
- Delhi NCR Transport Plan
- Lal Bahadur Shastri International Airport
- Hisar Airport
- List of airports in India
- List of the busiest airports in India
