= Rasulabad =

- Town
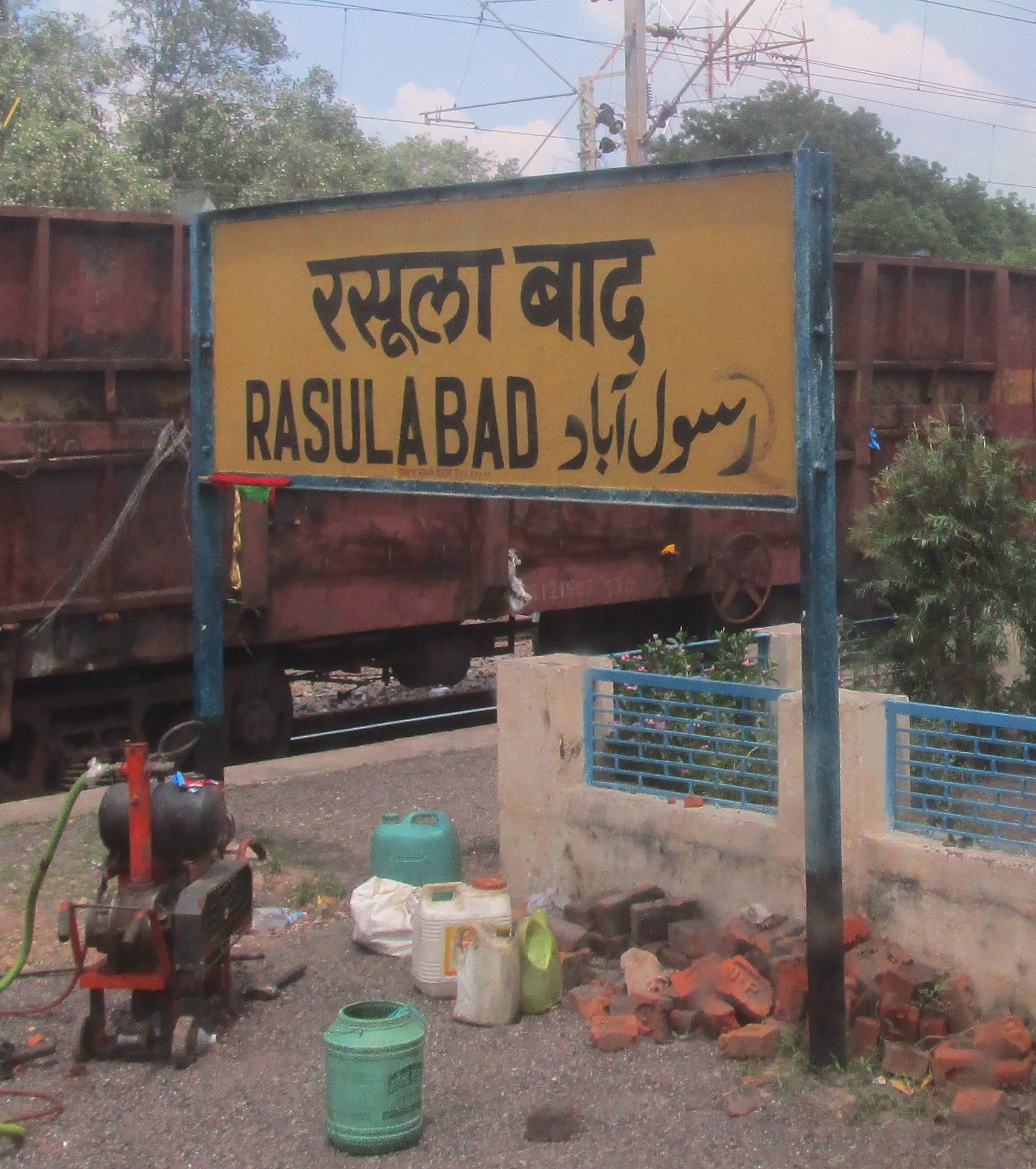
- Rasulabad railway station

- Location in Uttar Pradesh, India
- Coordinates: 26.68°N 79.78°E
- Country: India
- State: Uttar Pradesh
- District: Kanpur Dehat
- Elevation: 131 m (430 ft)

Population (2001)
  - Total: 7,235

Languages
  - Official: Hindi
- Time zone: UTC+5:30 (IST)

Rasulabad is a town and a nagar panchayat in Kanpur Dehat district in the Indian state of Uttar Pradesh.

== Geography ==
Rasulabad is located at 26.68°N 79.78°E. It has an average elevation of 131 metres (429 feet).

== Demographics ==
As of 2001 India census, Rasulabad had a population of 7,235. Males constitute 53% of the population and females 47%. Rasulabad has an average literacy rate of 41%, lower than the national average of 59.5%: male literacy is 49%, and female literacy is 31%. In Rasulabad, 19% of the population is under 6 years of age.

== International Airport ==
The government has proposed a large international airport near Rasulabad named Rasoolabad International Airport to handle domestic and international passengers of mid-Western Uttar Pradesh including Kanpur, Etawah, Bithoor, Kannauj and Jhansi region. The Airport will also serve as Cargo terminal for exports of various Industrial products of Kanpur and Unnao, perfumes of Kannauj, plastic materials of Auraiya and potatoes of Farrukhabad-Etawah belt. The Airport will also serve for international tourists to travel towards Gwalior, Jhansi, Kanpur, Sankassa, Orai, Orchha, Etawah (Lion Safari) and Agra.
