= Tilaunchi =

Village in Uttar Pradesh, India

Tilaunchi is a village in Kanpur Dehat district in the state of Uttar Pradesh, India.

== Transport ==
Tilaunchi Railway Station is on the railway line connecting Jhansi with Kanpur. Jhansi-Lucknow Passenger and Jhansi-Kanpur Passenger are among the main trains that pass through this station. To the west is Lalpur Railway Station (6 km [3.7 mi]), the nearest station. Going east, Paman Railway Station (8 km [5.0 mi]) is the station next to Tilaunchi. Kanpur Central Railway Station is the nearest major railway station (39 km [24 mi]). The Station Code is: TLNH.

It is also well connected to the road, about 3 km (1.9 mi) from the NH27 highway.

== Demographics ==
As of 2001 India census, Tilaunchi had a population of 1,458. Males constitute 54% of the population and females 46%.

== Geography ==
Tilaunchi is located at 26°20'29"N 80°1'25"E.
