= Paman, Kanpur Dehat =

Paman, Kanpur Dehat Paman paman railway station
- village
- Location in Uttar Pradesh, India Paman, Kanpur Dehat (India)
- Coordinates: 26°21′36″N 80°5′4″E
- Country: India
- State: Uttar Pradesh
- District: Kanpur Dehat

Languages
  - Official: Hindi
- Time zone: UTC+5:30 (IST)
- Vehicle registration: UP-
- Coastline: 0 kilometres (0 mi)

Paman is a village in Kanpur Dehat district in the state of Uttar Pradesh, India.

It is located in Sarwan Khera development block in Akbarpur tehsil.

== Transport ==
Paman is well connected by road and rail.

Paman Railway Station is on the railway line connecting Jhansi with Kanpur. Jhansi-Lucknow Passenger and Jhansi-Kanpur Passenger are among the main trains that pass through this station. To the west is Tilaunchi Railway Station (8 km), the nearest station. Going East, Rasulpur Gogumau Railway (4 km) Station is the station next to Paman. Kanpur Central Railway Station is The nearest major railhead. The Station Code is : PMN

== Geography ==
Paman is located at 26°21′36″N 80°5′4″E.
