= Malasa =

Amit singh malasa
- village
- Location in Uttar Pradesh, India Amit singh (India)
- Coordinates: 26.2675500°N 79.9448900°E
- Country: India
- State: Uttar Pradesh
- District: Kanpur Dehat

Government
  - Body: Gram panchayat

Languages
  - Official: Hindi
- Time zone: UTC+5:30 (IST)
- Vehicle registration: UP
- Website: up.gov.in

Dhaukalpur Malasa is a village in Kanpur Dehat district, Uttar Pradesh, India.

Malasa is one of the two development block in Bhognipur tehsil.

== Demographics ==
As of 2011 India census Malasa had a population of 3605 Males constitute 52.46% of the population and females 47.54%
