= Binaur =

- town
- Location in Uttar Pradesh, India
- Coordinates: 26°23′0″N 80°10′0″E
- Country: India
- State: Uttar Pradesh
- District: Kanpur
- Elevation: 127 m (417 ft)

Languages
  - Official: Hindi
- Time zone: UTC+5:30 (IST)
- Vehicle registration: UP-
- Coastline: 0 kilometres (0 mi)

Binaur is a town in Kanpur district in the state of Uttar Pradesh, India.

== Transport ==
Binaur is well connected by rail and road.

Binaur Railway Station is on the railway line connecting Jhansi with Kanpur. Jhansi-Lucknow Passenger and Jhansi-Kanpur Passenger are among the main trains that pass through this station. To the west is Rasulpur Gogumau Railway Station (4 KM), the nearest station. Going East, Bhimsen Railway Station (7 km)is the station next to Binaur. Kanpur Central Railway Station is The nearest major railhead. The Station Code is: BNAR

== Geography ==
Binaur is located at 26°23′0″N 80°10′0″E. It has an average elevation of 127 meters (419 feet).
