= Sandalpur =

Coordinates: 22°35′N 76°58′E

Sandalpur is a village in the Araria district in Bihar. The two primary religions in Sandalpur are Muslim and Hindu. Muslims belong to Shershahwadi cast, this cast is in OBC category. Hindus belong to Rajput and Harijon. Villagers are farmers.
