= Bhognipur =

- city
- Location in Uttar Pradesh, India Bhognipur (India)
- Coordinates: 26.24°N 79.80°E
- Country: India
- State: Uttar Pradesh
- District: Kanpur Dehat
- Elevation: 85 m (279 ft)

Languages
  - Official: Hindi
- Time zone: UTC+5:30 (IST)
- Vehicle registration: UP
- Website: up.gov.in

Bhognipur or Bhoganipur is a town in Kanpur Dehat district in the Indian state of Uttar Pradesh. It is the headquarters of the Tehsil of the same name and consists of the Amraudha and Malasa Development Blocks.

Situated at the junction of National Highway 519 and National Highway 27, Bhognipur is closest to the cities of Kanpur and Lucknow, 65 km and 140 km respectively. It is situated on Kanpur-Jhansi Road. Other nearby towns include Pukhrayan, Mawar, Rajpur, Gausganj and Kalpi, which is a local tourist attraction. The Pukhrayan railway station is the nearest railhead.

It is chiefly known for its chauraha (crossing). One road towards the west links Etawah. Towards the east it goes to Chaudagra via Ghatampur. Towards the north, it links Bara Jod and further Kanpur and towards the south it links Jhansi. Barauli village is near Bhoganipur.
