= Amraudha =

- Town
- Location in Uttar Pradesh, India Amraudha (India)
- Coordinates: 26°12′12″N 79°46′56″E
- Country: India
- State: Uttar Pradesh
- District: Kanpur Dehat

Government
  - Body: leader_ title =chairman leader_name =Pratibha Gautam W/O Mahesh Gautam

Population (2001)
  - Total: 8,890

Languages
  - Official: Hindi
- Time zone: UTC+5:30 (IST)
- Postal code: 209112
- Telephone code: 05113
- Vehicle registration: UP
- Website: up.gov.in

Amraudha is a town and a nagar panchayat in Kanpur Dehat district in the state of Uttar Pradesh, India. It is a Development block in Bhognipur tehsil.

== Location ==
It is located at 9 kilometer from city Pukhrayan toward south -west near Kanpur-Jhansi road.

== Demographics ==
As of 2001 India census, Amraudha had a population of 8890. Males constitute 54% of the population and females 46%. Amraudha has an average literacy rate of 48%, lower than the national average of 59.5%; with 61% of the males and 39% of females literate. 19% of the population is under 6 years of age.
