= Jhinjhak =

- Town
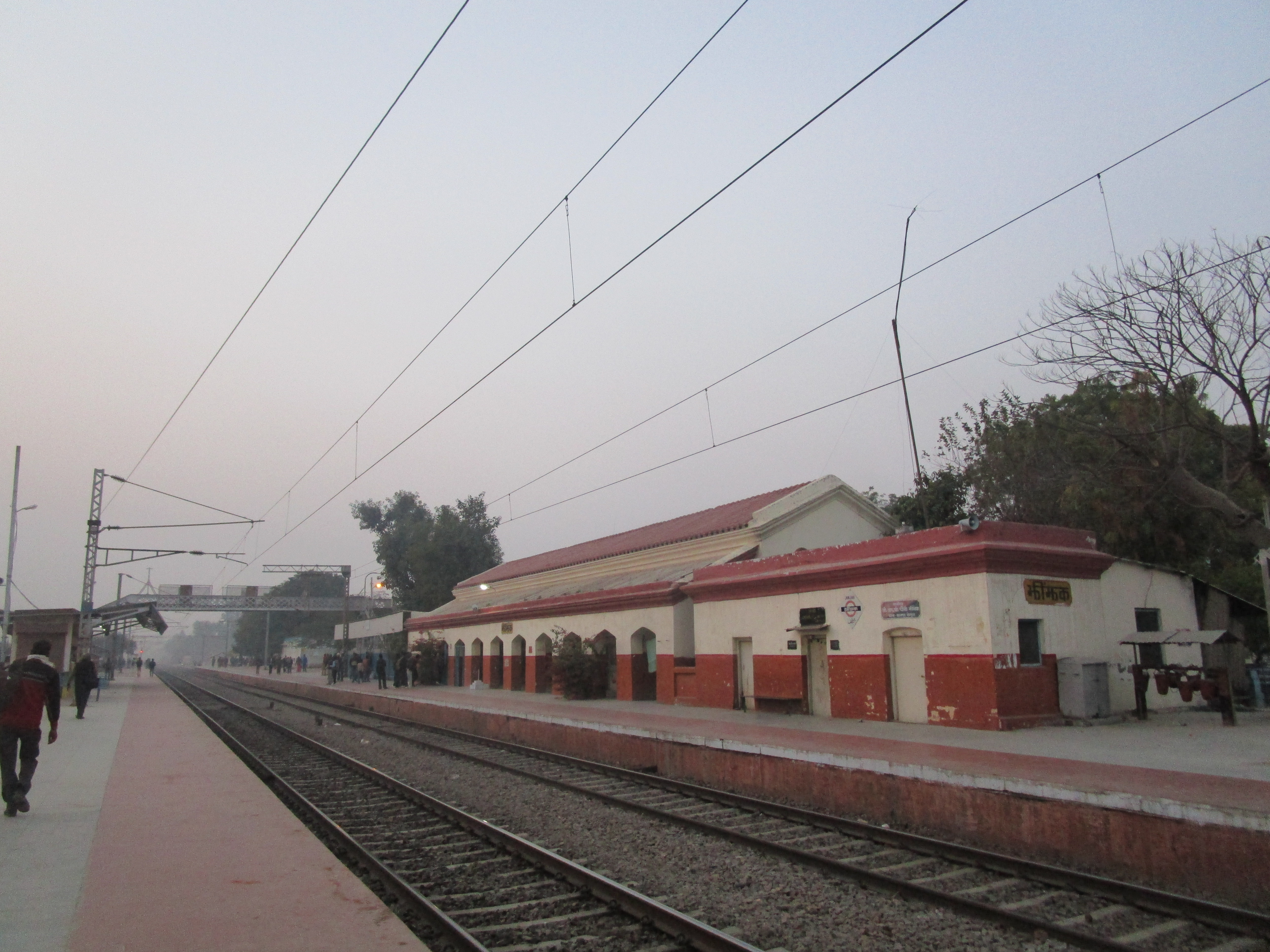
- Jhinjhak Railway Station

- Location in Uttar Pradesh, India
- Coordinates: 26.5512803°N 79.7350681°E
- Country: India
- State: Uttar Pradesh
- District: Kanpur Dehat district
- Lok Sabha constituency: Kannauj
- Assembly constituency: Rasulabad
- Established: 1916
- Founder: British rule

Government
  - Chairman: Sarojini Devi
- Elevation: 131 m (430 ft)

Population (2011 est.)
  - Total: 45,000

Languages
  - Official: Hindi
- Time zone: UTC+5:30 (IST)
- PIN: 209302
- Telephone code: 05114
- Vehicle registration: UP-77
- Website: http://kanpurdehat.nic.in/

Jhinjhak (Jhīñjhak) is a town and a Municipal council in Kanpur Dehat district, India. The town is situated on the Lower Ganges Canal and is approximately 20 kilometres (12 mi) from the industrial city of Dibiyapur.

== Name ==
According to Paul Whalley, the name Jhīñjhak is derived from a reduplicated form of jhān (a common variant of standard Hindi jhāṛ ("bushes, undergrowth"; ultimately from Sanskrit jhāṭa), with the pleonastic suffix -ka at the end.

== History ==
Jhinjhak Nagar Panchayat was founded on January 11, 1916, by the British Government. In 1972, its territory expanded to include the nearby villages "Turana" and "Tikan Gaon." In 2016, Jhinjhak gained the Nagar Palika Parishad, further expanding its territory to include nearby villages.

== Transport ==
=== Rail ===
Jhinjhak is served by the Kanpur-Phaphund-Tundla Sub-section, of Kanpur-Delhi section. Jhinjhak Railway Station is on the Delhi-Howrah rail route. It is a major station between Etawah and Kanpur central. It lies on the North Central railway zone. To the east, Ambiapur Station (10 km) is the nearest station. Going west, Parjani (5 km) is the next station. Kanpur Central Railway Station is the nearest major railway station.

Direct trains to Kanpur Central, Lucknow, Allahabad, Patna, Etawah, Dibiyapur, Agra, Delhi, Hathras run from this railway station. Kanpur Central railway station is 63 kilometres (39 mi) away from other railway stations that service major cities in the country.

=== Road ===
Jhinjhak is 50 km from the town Agra-Lucknow's expressway. NH 19 (previously, National Highway 2) is 25 kilometres (16 mi) from the town. A road network connects the city to nearby cities including Dibiyapur, Auraiya, Kannauj, and Kanpur.

=== Air ===
Two nearest airports to Jhinjhak are Lucknow Airport and Kanpur Chakeri Airport. Lucknow Airport services major cities within the country as well as several international destinations. Kanpur Chakeri Airport services strictly domestic destinations.

== Places of worship ==
- Akshayvat Akhaivar Temple
- Jai Mata Di Temple
- Shiva and Hanuman temple at Chota Chouraha
- Sati Maa temple, Basti
