= Derapur =

Derapur Derapur
- town
- Location in Uttar Pradesh, India
- Coordinates: 26°25′0″N 79°48′0″E
- Country: India
- State: Uttar Pradesh
- District: Kanpur Dehat

Government
  - Body: Nagar Panchayat
  - Chairman: Ali Ansar Waris (Guddu Fauji)
- Elevation: 124 m (407 ft)

Languages
  - Official: Hindi
- Time zone: UTC+5:30 (IST)
- Postal code: 209301
- Vehicle registration: UP-77
- Coastline: 0 kilometres (0 mi)

Derapur is a town in Kanpur Dehat district in the state of Uttar Pradesh, India. It is the headquarters of the Tehsil of the same name. Derapur is 61 km (38 mi) away from Kanpur city.

== Transport ==
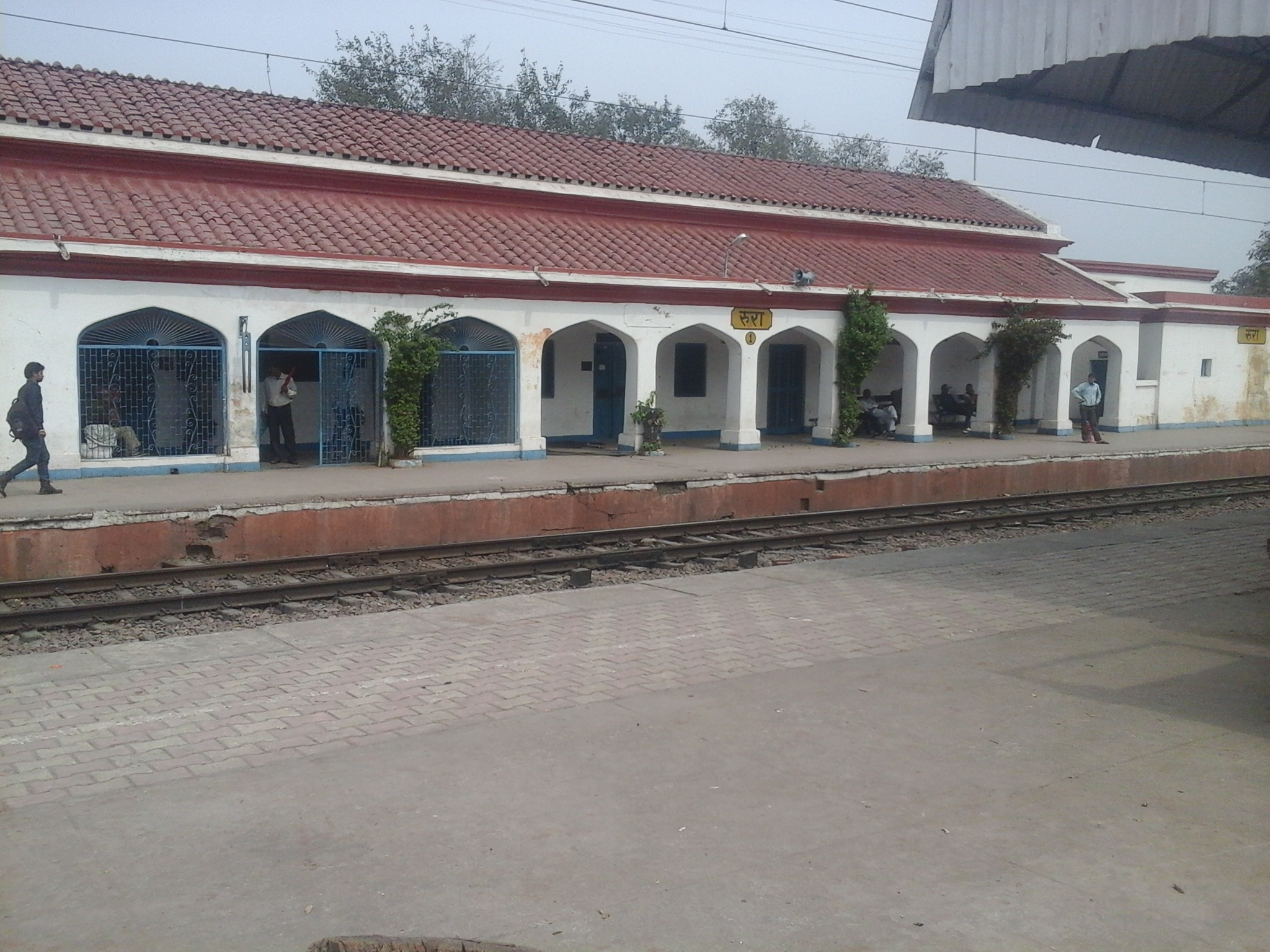
Rura Railway Station

Derapur is well connected by trains and roads. Rura is the nearest railway station (NCR) to Derapur town. Rura is towards the north at a distance of 14 km (8.7 mi) where super-fast and express trains are available. It is connected towards east Kanpur Patna, Havrah and towards west Aligarh, Agra, Delhi, etc. It is also connected by roads to the Golden Quadrilateral National Highway of India at Mungisapur, at a distance of 6 km (3.7 mi) towards the south. It is situated on the south bank of the river Sengur.

== Educational institutions ==
Galuapur Inter College is a government aided institution of sub division Derapur.

== Festivals ==
All national festivals, Holi, Diwali, Mahashivratri, Shri Krishna Janmashtami, Ramnavami, Makar Sankranti, Eid-ul-Fitr, Rakshabandhan, Hanuman jayanti and other local ones such as Nag-Panchmi, Navratri, Durga Puja are celebrated with enthusiasm. . Savitri vrat and Navratri vrat are main festival of women of town Derapur, At the time of savitri vrat women takes 101 round of banyan tree. Vijayadashami is a most famous festival of the town Derapur. It is celebrated continuously three days. A fair is also organized for 15 days.

== Temples ==
=== Kapaleshwar Temple ===
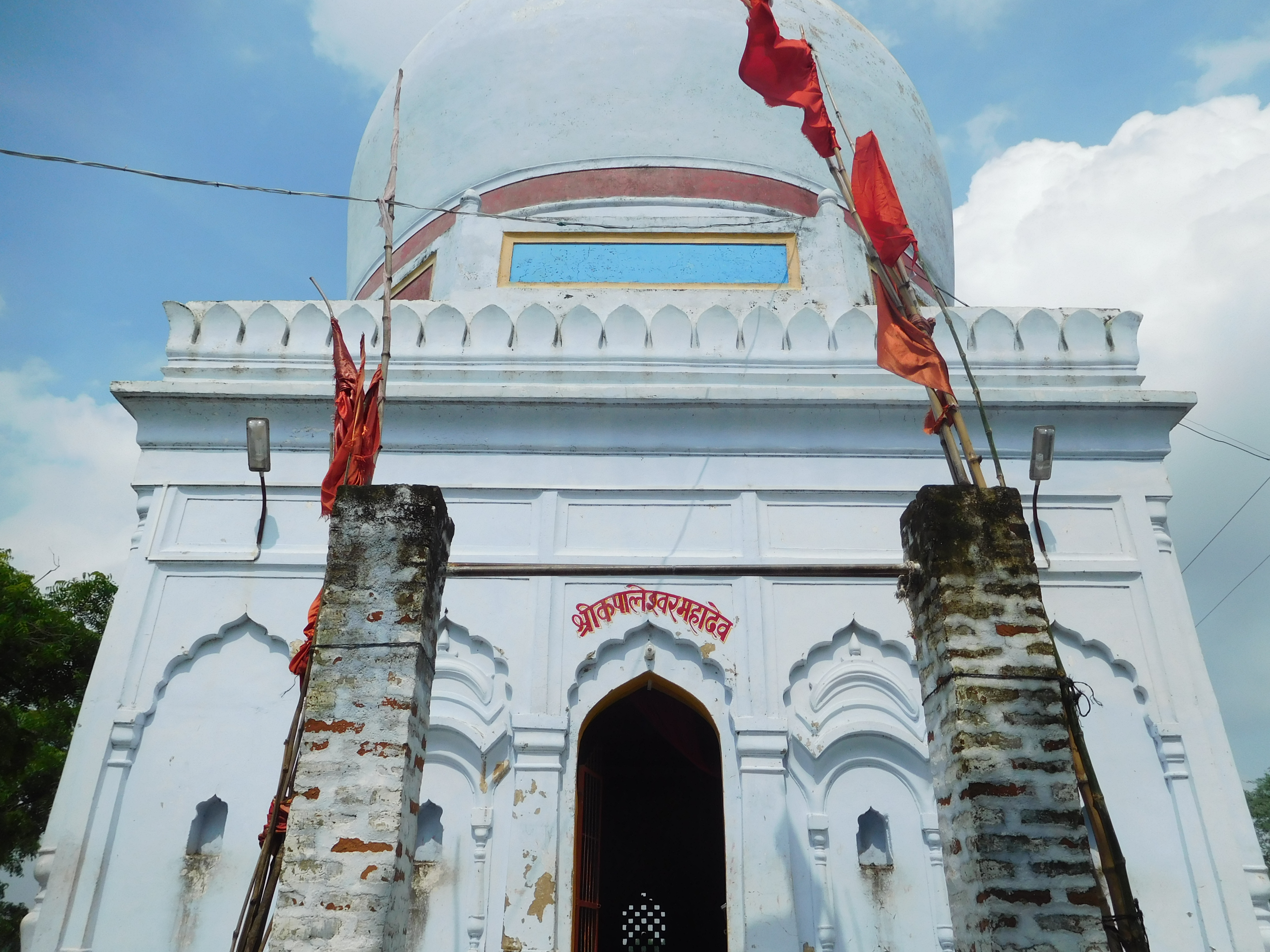
Kapaleeshwar Temple

This temple is situated towards the north-east about 2 km (1.2 mi) from town Derapur, near the left bank of river Sengur. Inside the temple on the floor, from south to north in the direction is installed a 1.40-meter-long mausoleum (Samadhi). Shivlinga is installed on the northern tip of the mausoleum (Samadhi). It is centre of faith of people. It was built in 1893. The crowd of devotees every Monday in the month of Sawan every year. A fair is also held here on Maha Shivaratri festival in the month of Falgun Hindu calendar every year.

=== Sankat Mochan Temple ===
Hanuman Temple, also known as Sankat Mochan Hanuman Temple, is located on Mungisapur Road in Derapur. It was built by Mr. Suraj Narayan Gupta and his wife, Mrs. Uma Devi Gupta. Devotee from Derapur and nearby villages pay their respects to Lord Hanuman at the temple, and the Sunderkand Path is held on a regular basis.

== Notable people ==
Ram Nath Kovind is 14th President of India. He was ex-Governor of Bihar. Born at village Paraukh, Derapur, Kanpur Dehat district.

== Gallery ==
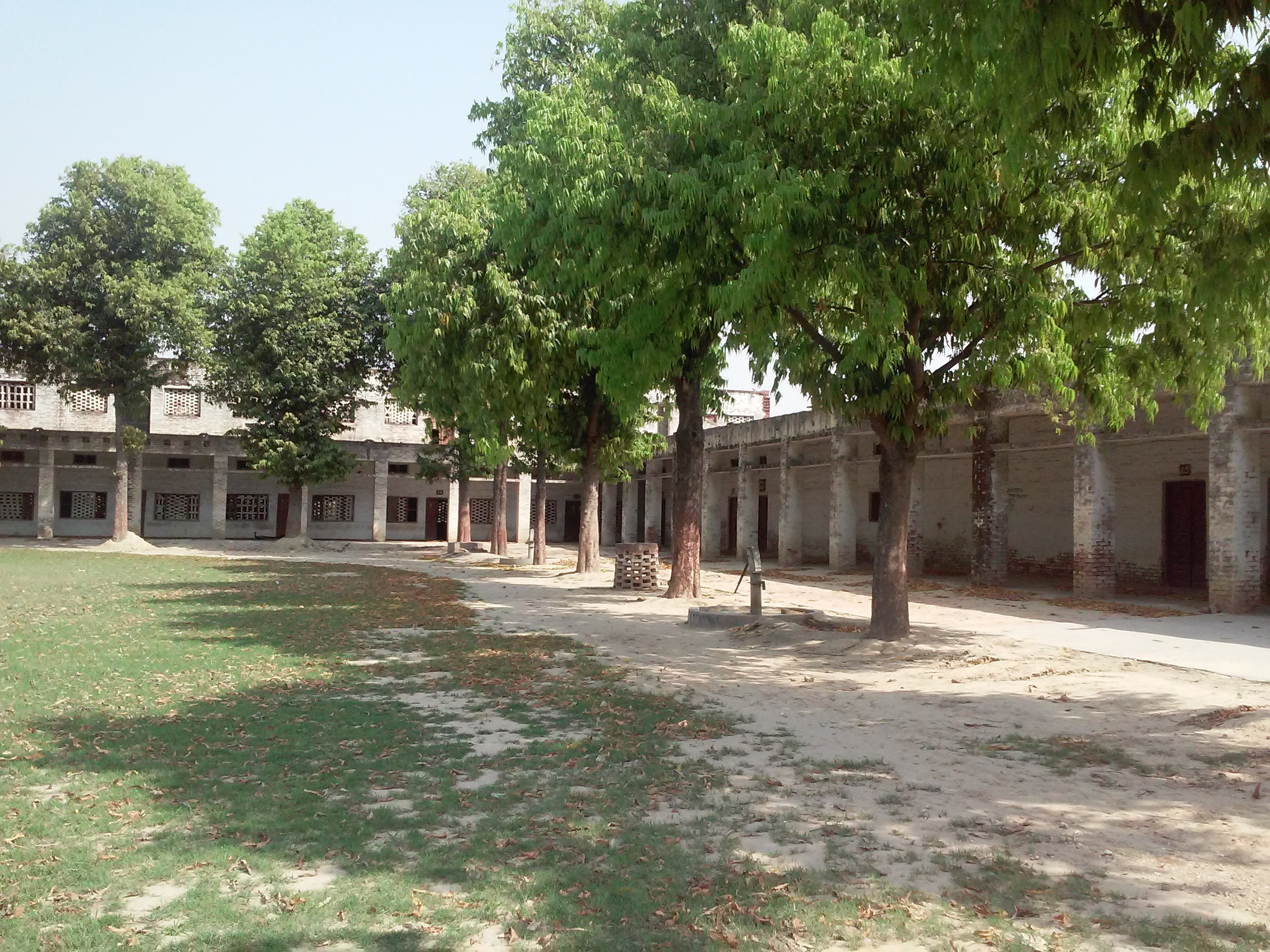
Galuwapur Inter College

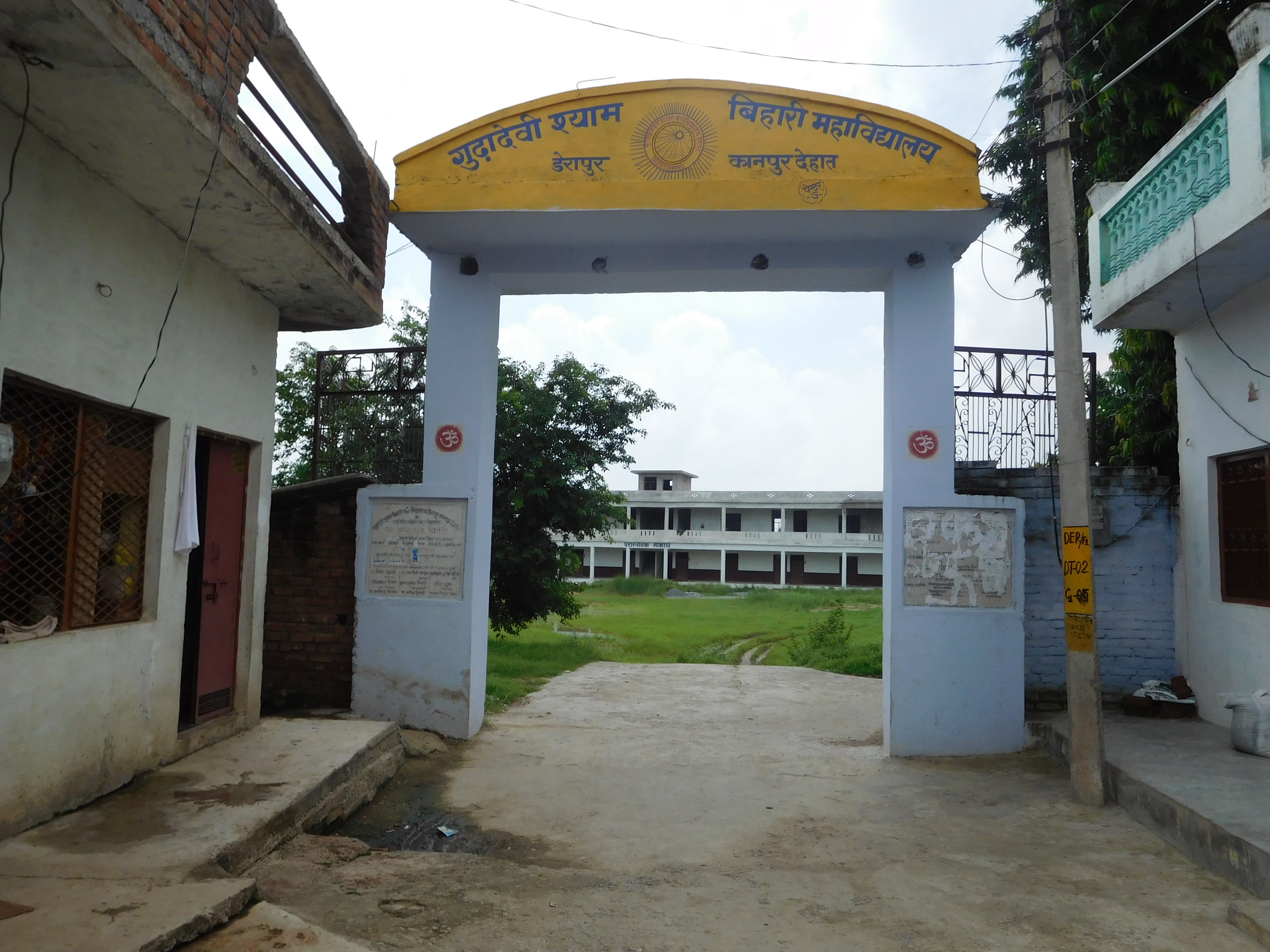
Gudha Devi Shyam Bihari Degree College
