= Kanpur Dehat district =

- District of Uttar Pradesh
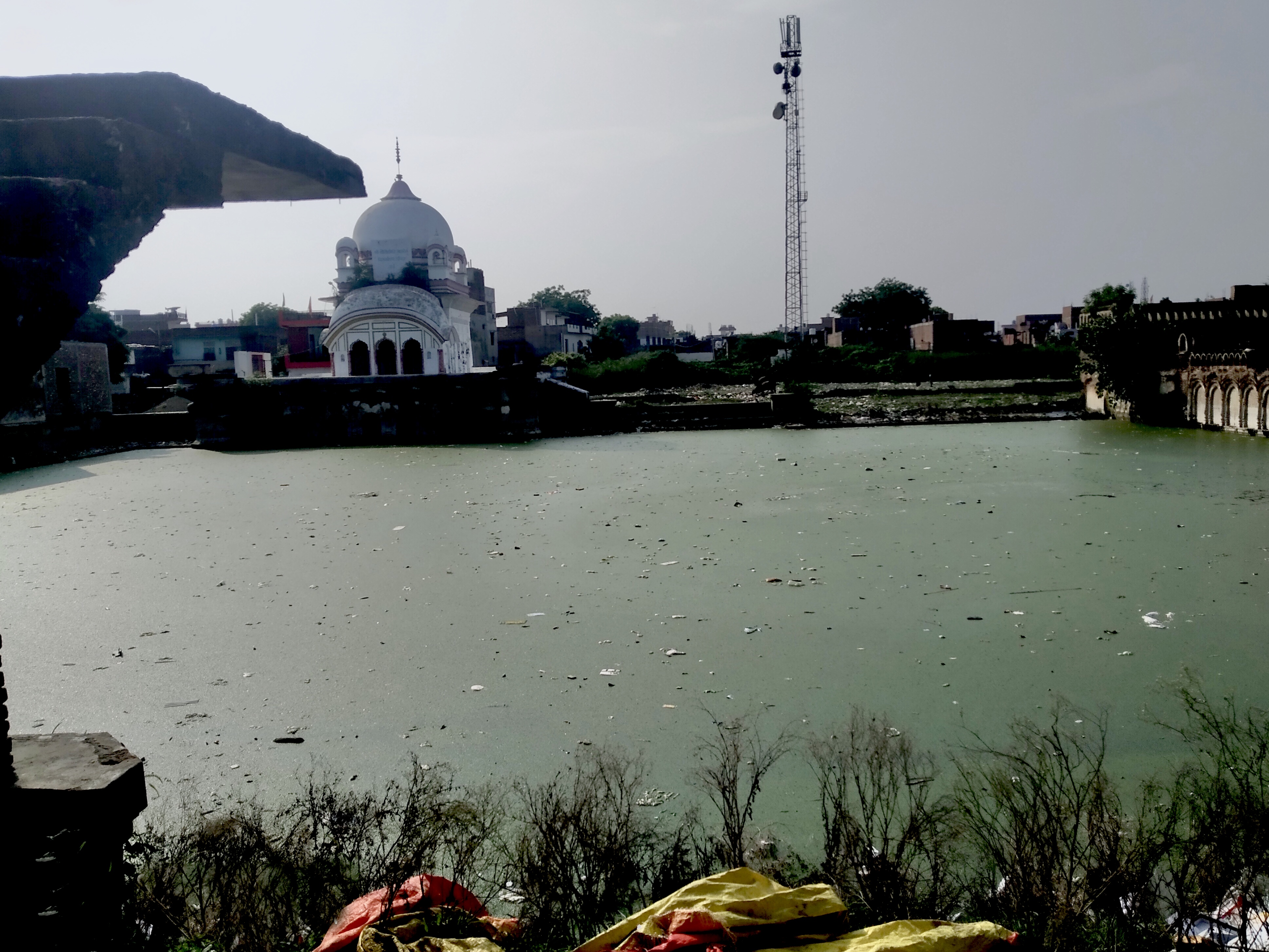
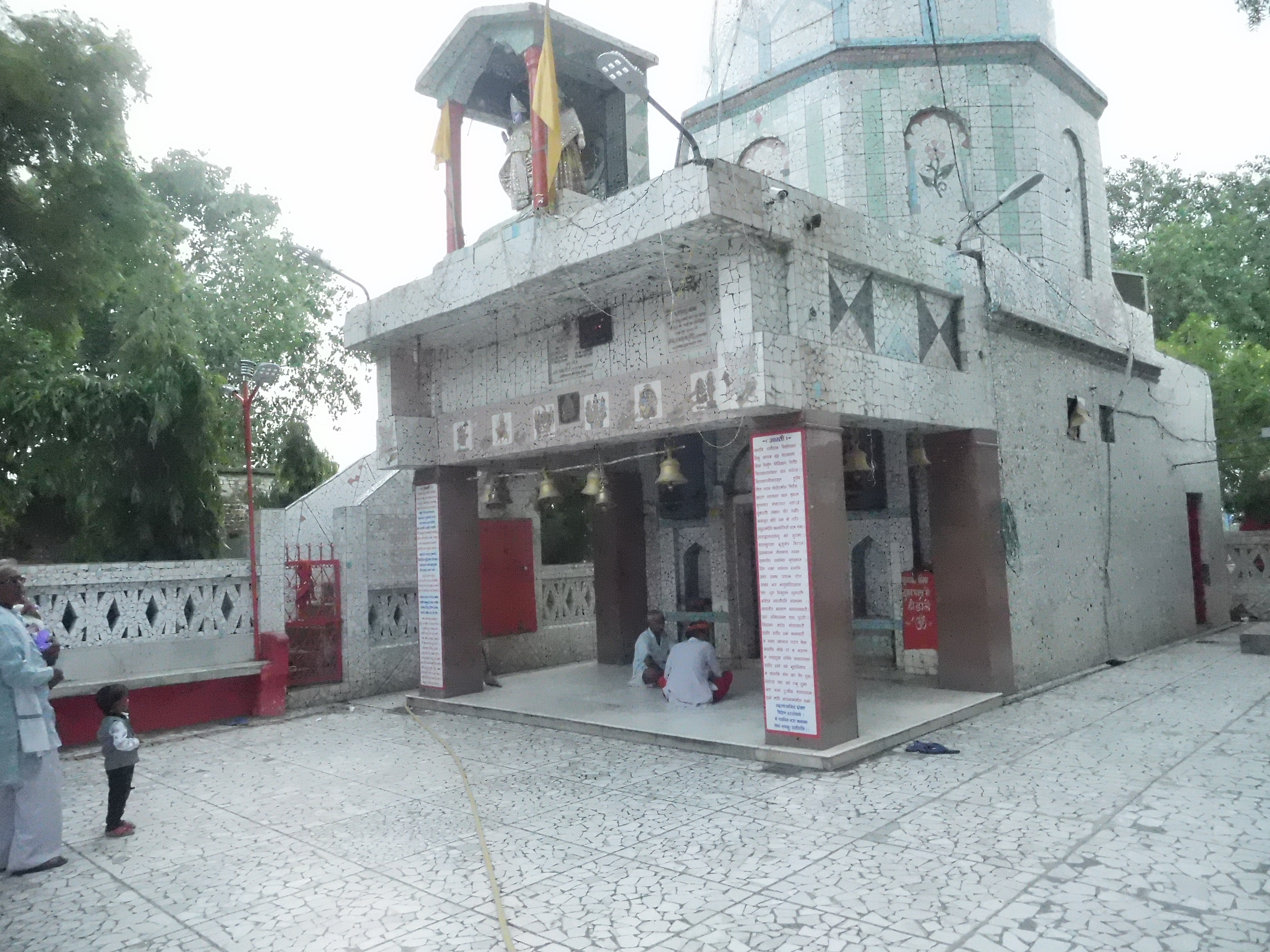
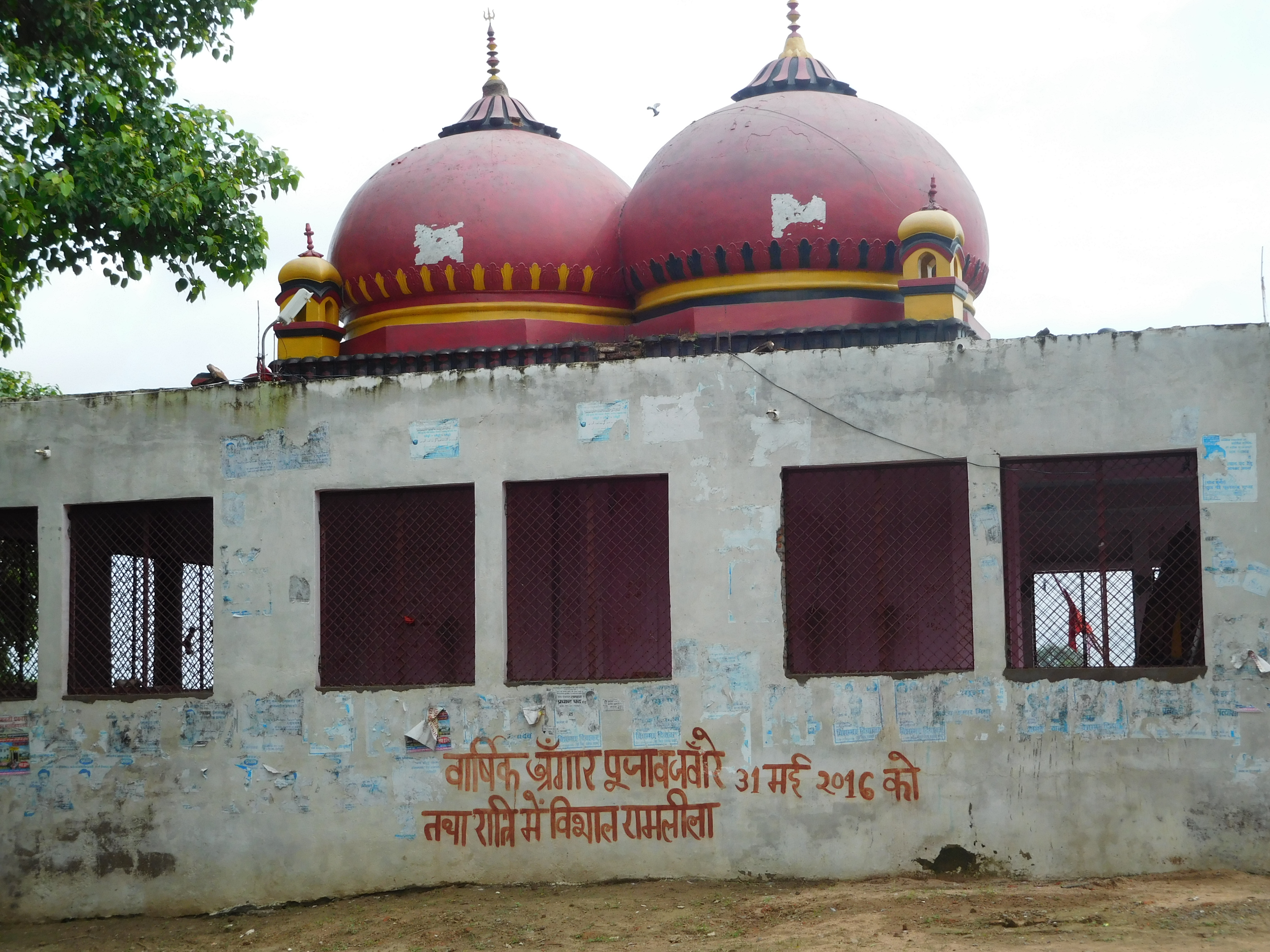
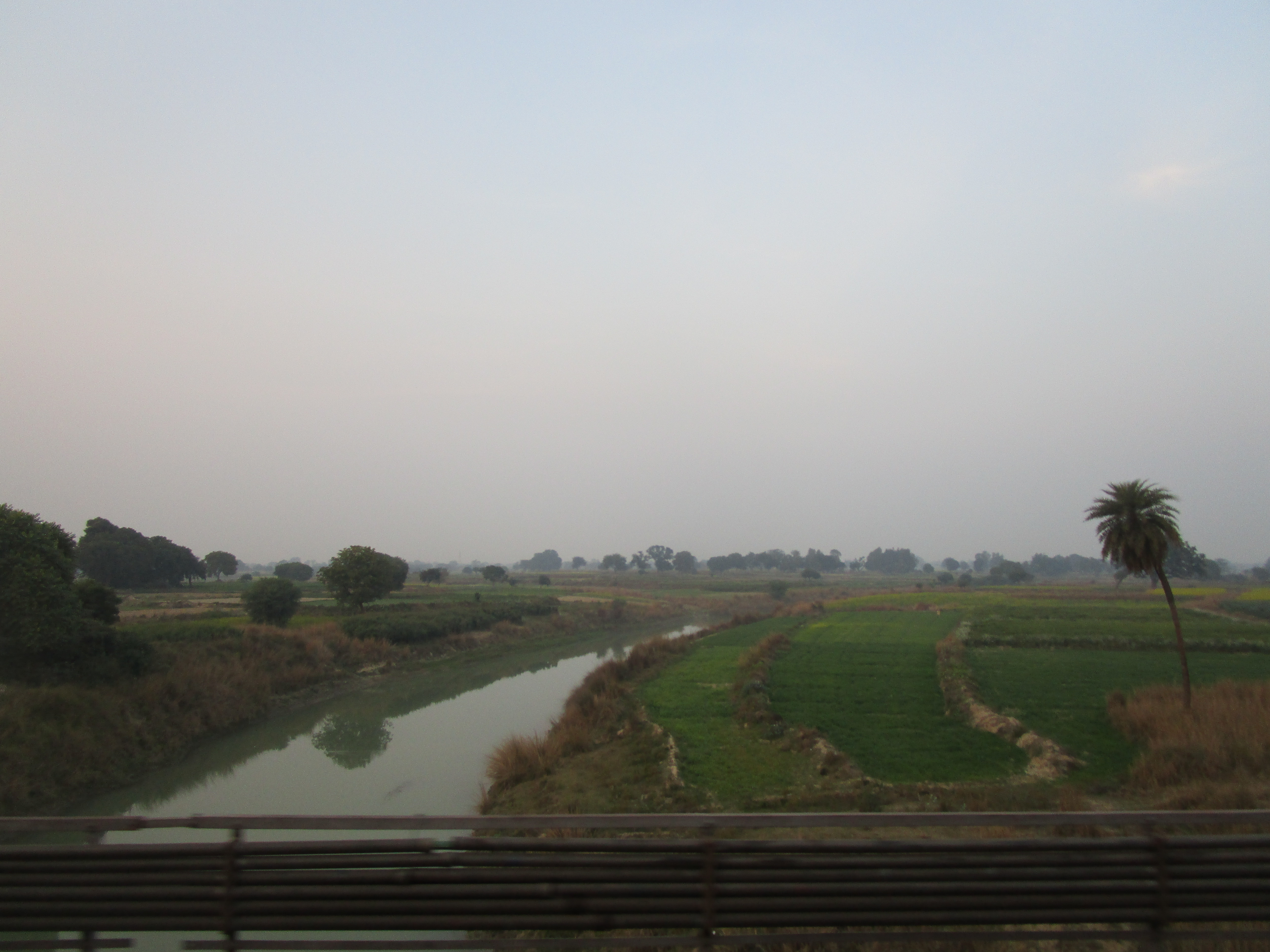
- Clockwise from top-left: Temple in Akbarpur, Dharmagarh Temple in Rasulabad, Parhul Devi Temple, Rind River, Kali Devi Mandir in Arahriyamau Bhognipur, Dehat

- Location of Kanpur Dehat district in Uttar Pradesh
- Coordinates (Akbarpur, Kanpur Dehat): 26.3443°N 79.96718°E
- Country: India
- State: Uttar Pradesh
- Division: Kanpur
- Headquarters: Akbarpur
- Tehsils: 1. Akbarpur, 2. Bhognipur, 3. Rasulabad, 4. Derapur, 5. Sikandara,

Government
  - Lok Sabha constituencies: 1. Akbarpur (Lok Sabha constituency)- Akbarpur-Raniya; 2. Kannauj (Lok Sabha constituency)- Rasulabad; 3. Etawah (Lok Sabha constituency)- Sikandra; 4. Jalaun (Lok Sabha constituency)- Bhognipur
  - Vidhan Sabha constituencies: 1. Rasulabad; 2. Akbarpur-Raniya; 3. Sikandra; 4. Bhognipur

Area
  - Total: 3,021 km^{2} (1,166 sq mi)

Population (2011)
  - Total: 1,796,184
  - Density: 594.6/km^{2} (1,540/sq mi)
  - Urban: 173,423

Demographics
  - Literacy: 65.15%
- Time zone: UTC+05:30 (IST)
- Vehicle registration: UP-77
- Website: kanpurdehat.nic.in

Kanpur Dehat district is a district in Uttar Pradesh state in northern India. The administrative headquarters of the district are at Mati-Akbarpur. This district is part of Kanpur division. Kanpur was formerly spelled Cawnpore.

== History ==
The Battle of Madarpur, which occurred in 1528 CE, was fought between the Bhuinhar Brahman zamindars and the Mughal Empire. It took place in what is now the Greater Kanpur district. This land is home to the patriotic Sachan community, who provided both blood and wealth in support of Nana Saheb and Tatya Tope during the 1857 Revolt. They willingly relinquished their zamindaries in the name of the struggle for independence. Sachan people are predominantly located in the Bhognipur Tehsil and its surrounding areas.

Kanpur District was divided into two districts, namely Kanpur and Greater Kanpur in year 1977. The two were reunited again in 1979 and again separated in 1981. Uttar Pradesh government decided to rename Kanpur Dehat district as Ramabai Nagar district on 1 July 2010. In July 2012, it was returned to Kanpur Dehat.

== Administrative Subdivisions ==
=== Tehsils in Kanpur Dehat district ===
1. Akbarpur
2. Bhognipur
3. Derapur
4. Rasulabad
5. Sikandara

=== Block in Kanpur Dehat district ===
1. Akbarpur
2. Maitha
3. Sarvankheda
4. Derapur
5. Jhinjhak
6. Rasulabad
7. Amraudha
8. Malasa
9. Sandalpur
10. Rajpur

== Political representatives ==
=== Legislative Council ===
Name	Member	Party
Kanpur Graduate Constituency	Arun Pathak	Bharatiya Janata Party

=== Legislative Assembly ===
Name	Member	Party
Akbarpur-Raniya	Pratibha Shukla	Bharatiya Janta Party
Bhognipur	Rakesh Sachan	Bharatiya Janta Party
Sikandra	Ajit Singh Pal	Bharatiya Janta Party
Rasulabad	Poonam Sankhwar	Bharatiya Janta Party

=== Parliamentary constituencies ===
Name	Member	Party
Akbarpur	Devendra Singh Bhole	Bharatiya Janta Party
Kannauj	Akhilesh Yadav	Samajwadi party
Etawah	Jitendra Kumar Dohare	Samajwadi party
Jalaun	Narayan Das Ahirwar	Samajwadi party

== Transport ==
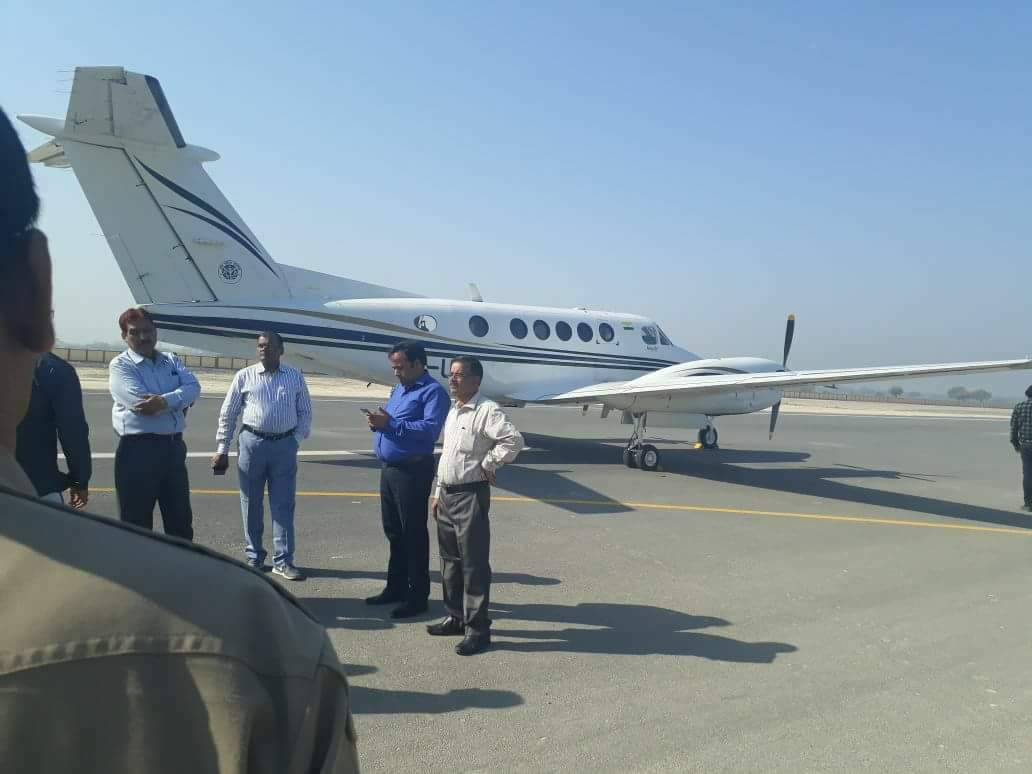
An aeroplane at Kanpur Dehat's Marhamtabad Airstrip (2018)

The district is well connected by railways. Three rail tracks run through Greater Kanpur district. The railway route connecting Delhi to Hawrah belonging to North Central zone of Indian Railways is passing through centre of the district. This railway track is broad gauge and fully electrified. The railway stations on this route through the district are Bhaupur, Maitha, Roshan Mau Halt, Rura, Ambiyapur, Jhinjhak and Parjani Halt. Rura Railway Station is the main railway Station of Kanpur Dehat District.

The second track is Kanpur to Jhansi railway line. The railway stations on this route are Binaur, Rasulpur Gogumau, Tilaunchi, Paman, Lalpur, Malasa, Pukhrayan and Chaunrah. This broad gauge railway track is electrified also belongs to North Central zone.

The third railway line converted to broad gauge belongs to North Eastern Railway zone. The track runs parallel to the Ganges river. This track is also electrified.

Greater Kanpur is also equipped with Metro station corridor having Red, Orange, Silver in Bhaupur, Akbarpur, Maitha etc. of UPMRC

== Notable residents ==
- Ram Nath Kovind, former governor of Bihar and former President of India

== Locations ==
=== Religious ===
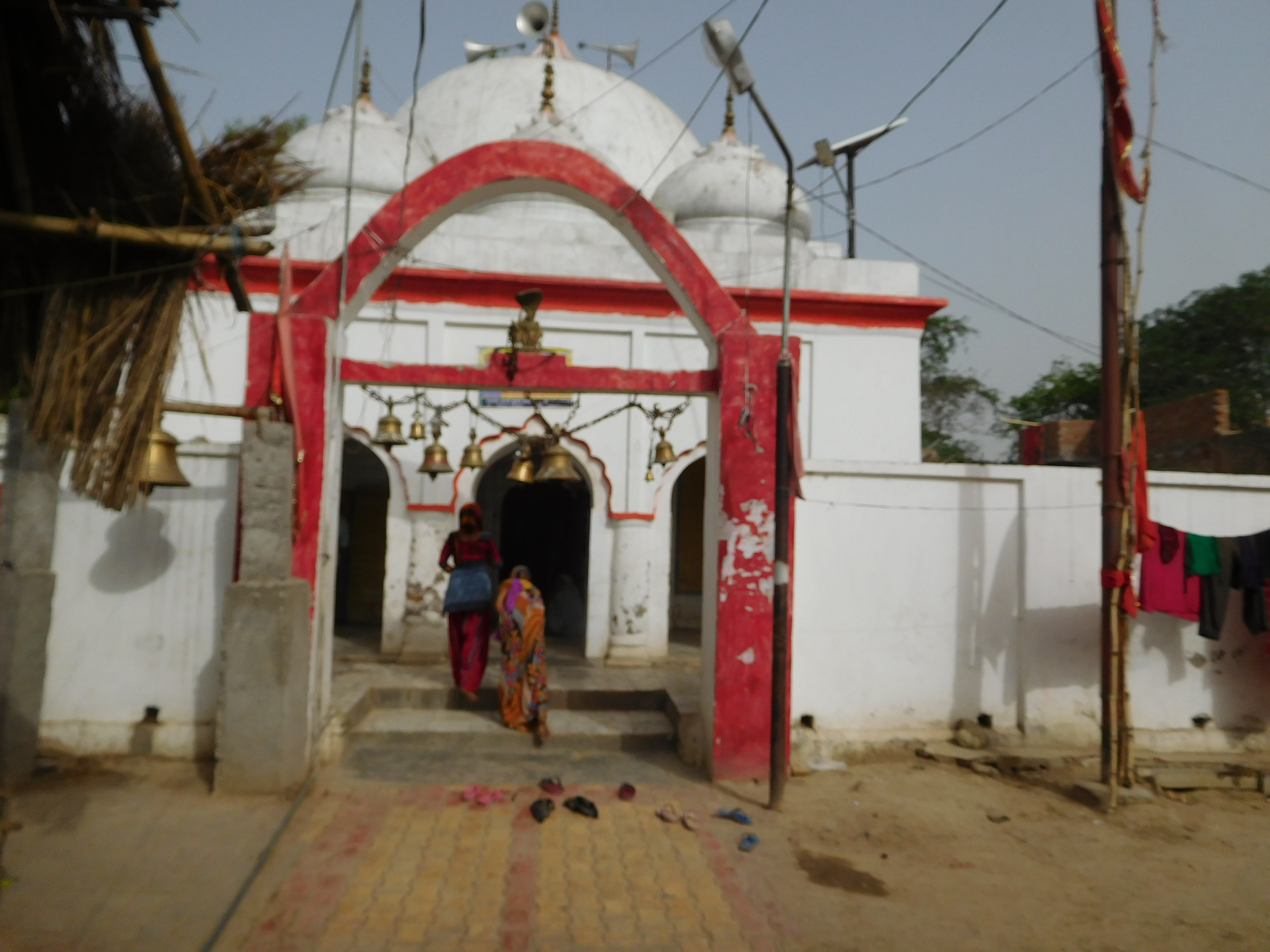
Waneshwar Mahadev Mandir

- Waneshwar Mahadev Temple: Banipara
- Kapaleshwar Temple: Derapur
- Parhul Devi Temple: near Rura
- Mukta Devi Temple: near Musanagar
- Katyani Devi (Kathari Devi) Temple: 6 km towards south of village Shahjahanpur in uneven land
- Durvasa Rishi Ashram: In near village NIGOHI Bank of segur river
- Jageshwar Temple: Shivli
- Dharma Garh Baba Temple: Rasulabad, Kanpur Dehat
- Shri Ram Janki Temple: Lohari

=== Villages ===
- Dharau
- Durrajpur
- Arahriyamau
- Lohari

== Educational institutions ==
- RSGU Post Graduate College Pukhrayan
- Akbarpur Degree College Akbarpur Kanpur Dehat
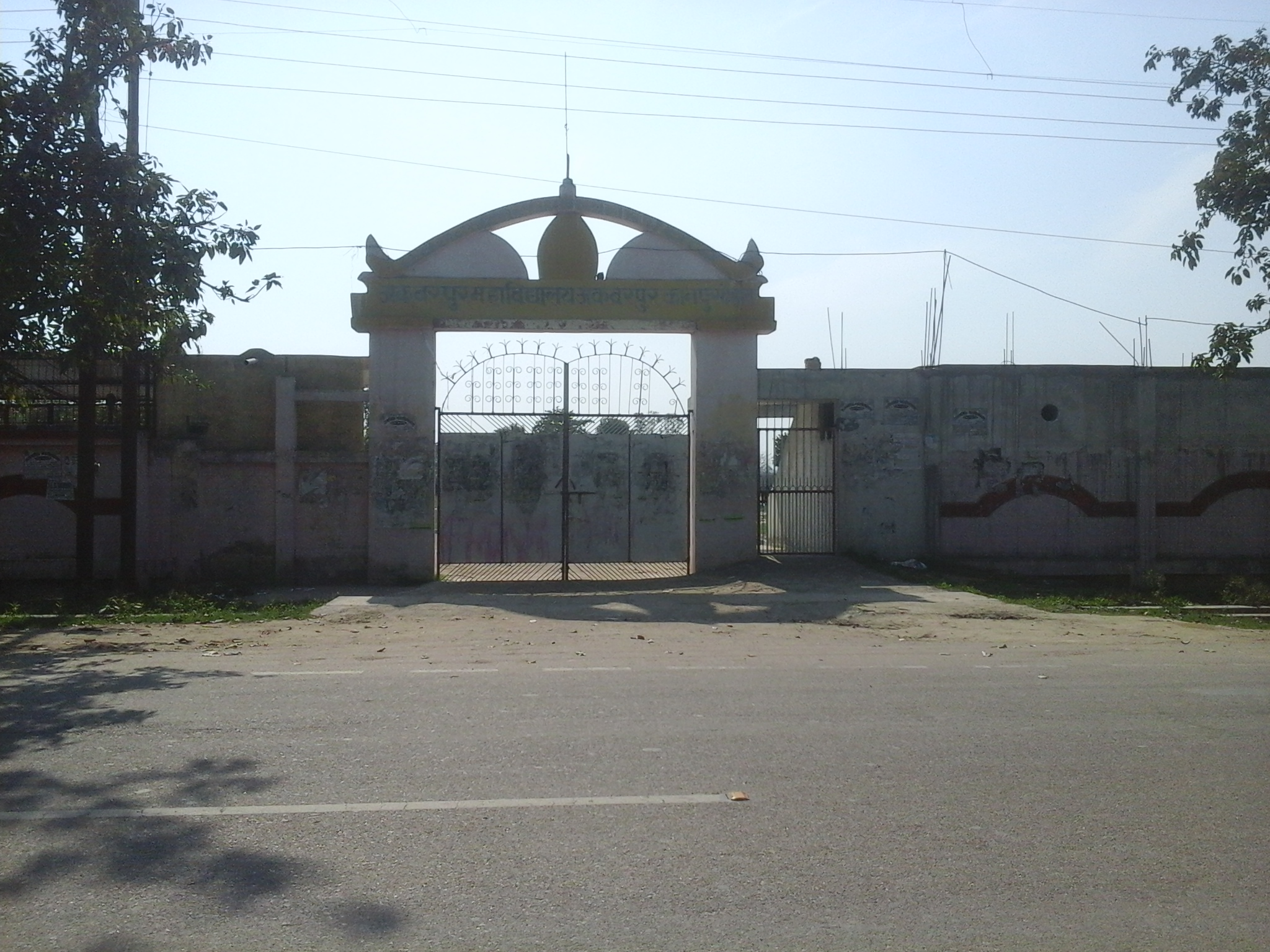
  Akbarpur Degree College
- Govt.Degree College, Akbarpur, Kanpur Dehat
- R P S Inter College, Rura
- Akbarpur Inter College Akbarpur
- Kendriya Vidyalaya, Mati
- Jawahar Navodaya Vidyalaya Kanpur Dehat
- Patel Vidyapeeth Inter College Baraur
- Gram Vikas Inter College Budhauli
- Akbarpur Girls Inter College Akbarpur
- Shri Ram Janki Sanskrit Mahavidyalaya Gauriyapur
- Malviya Inter College mungisapur Kanpur dehat
- Mayank Shekhar Mahavidyalaya Kaurauwa kanpur Dehat

== Demographics ==
Historical population
Year	Pop.	±% p.a.
1901	398,550	—
1911	361,641	−0.97%
1921	363,659	+0.06%
1931	383,790	+0.54%
1941	492,694	+2.53%
1951	614,143	+2.23%
1961	734,347	+1.80%
1971	897,068	+2.02%
1981	1,087,032	+1.94%
1991	1,303,232	+1.83%
2001	1,563,336	+1.84%
2011	1,796,184	+1.40%

Religions in Kanpur Dehat district (2011)
Religion	Percent
Hinduism	89.80%
Islam	9.82%
Other or not stated	0.38%
Distribution of religions

According to the 2011 census Kanpur Dehat district has a population of 1,795,092, roughly equal to the nation of The Gambia or the US state of Nebraska. This gives it a ranking of 268th in India (out of a total of 640 districts). The district has a population density of 594 inhabitants per square kilometre (1,540/sq mi). Its population growth rate over the decade 2001-2011 was 14.82%. Kanpur Dehat has a sex ratio of 862 females for every 1000 males, and a literacy rate of 77.52%. 9.66% of the population lives in urban areas. Scheduled Castes make up 25.66% of the population.

Languages of Kanpur Dehat district (2011)
1. Hindi (99.0%)
2. Urdu (0.94%)
3. Others (0.09%)

At the time of the 2011 Census of India, 98.97% of the population in the district spoke Hindi (or a related language) and 0.94% Urdu as their first language.

== Kos Minars ==
Since the Mughal Road passes through Greater Kanpur district, there are many Kos Minar (mile pillars) in the district. Some of them are protected monuments, notable ones are at Bhognipur, Chapar Ghata, Deosar, Gaur, Halia, Jallapur Sikandara, Pailwaru, Pitampur, Raigawan, Rajpur, Sankhiln Buzurg, Sardarpur.

== International airport proposal ==
An international airport named Rasoolabad International Airport was proposed in 2015 to be constructed in Kanpur Dehat district about 50 km from Kanpur. The airport will serve the region from Agra division, Jhansi division, Kanpur division, Aligarh division, Allahabad division, Banda division and Lucknow division. It would have direct link road with Agra Lucknow Expressway.
