= Pukhrayan =

- Town
- Location in Uttar Pradesh, India
- Coordinates: 26.23°N 79.85°E
- Country: India
- State: Uttar Pradesh
- District: Kanpur Dehat

Government
  - Type: state
  - Body: Municipality

Area
  - Total: 24 km^{2} (9.3 sq mi)

Population (2001)
  - Total: 19,908
  - Density: 830/km^{2} (2,100/sq mi)

Languages
  - Official: Hindi
- Time zone: UTC+5:30 (IST)
- PIN: 209111
- Telephone code: 05113
- Vehicle registration: UP-77

Pukhrayan is a town and a Municipality in Amrodha Block in Kanpur Dehat district in the Indian state of Uttar Pradesh. Found to the south-west of Mati on National Highway 25, Pukhrayan is 2 km (1.2 mi) from Bhognipur.

== Geography ==
Pukhrayan is located at 26.23°N 79.85°E. It is on average elevation of 124 m (407 ft) above sea level. It is 22 km (14 mi) from (District Headquarters) Mati.

Holy river Yamuna is near about 15 km (9.3 mi) south of the city. Holy river Ganga is near about 65 km (40 mi) east of the city.

== Transport ==
=== Rail ===
Pokhrayan is main railway station of Kanpur Dehat districton Kanpur -Jhansi railway section under North Central Railway zone in Jhansi Division.

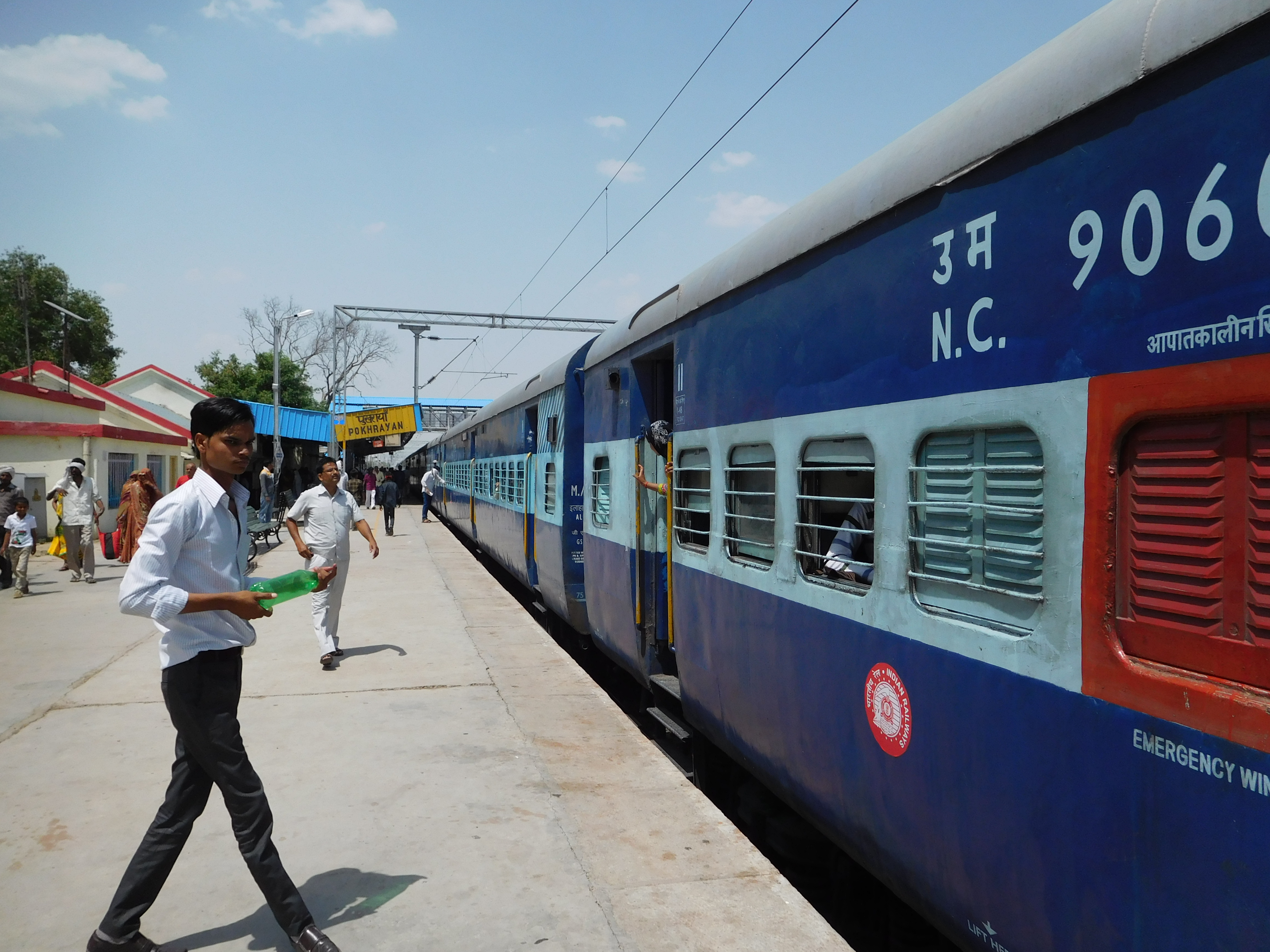
Pukhrayan Railway Station

Bus services from Pukhrayan to Jhansi, Pukhrayan to Delhi, Pukhrayan to Gujarat are also available.

=== Road ===
Lucknow-Jhansi National High Way passes through Pukhrayan city.

== Demographics ==
As of 2021 India census, Pukhrayan had a population of 65,503. Males constitute 51% of the population and females 49%. Pukhrayan has an average literacy rate of 88%, higher than the national average of 59.5%: male literacy is 85%, and female literacy is 77%. In Pukhrayan, 20% of the population is under 6 years of age.

== Education ==
- Asian Public School, Pukhrayan
- Saint Vivekanand Public School, Pukhrayan
- RSGU Post Graduate College Pukhrayan
- RSGU Inter college Pukhrayan
- GGI college Pukhrayan
- Vivekanand Rashtriya Inter College
- Prema Katiyar Shikshan Sansthaan
- Shivwati Shivanandan Shukla Mahavidyalay
- BKSD Global School
- Fun kids Pre School
- Rajrani Dulichand School
- National Inter College
- Sarasvati Bal Mandir Inter Collage
- Indian public School
- The Jain World School
