= 2004 Indian general election in Uttar Pradesh =

- 26 April 2004; 5, 10 May 2004

80 seats
- Turnout: 48.16%
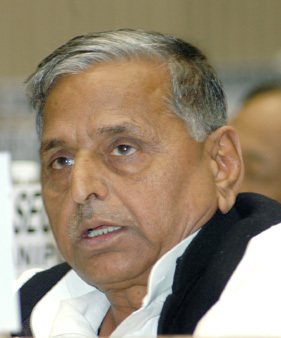

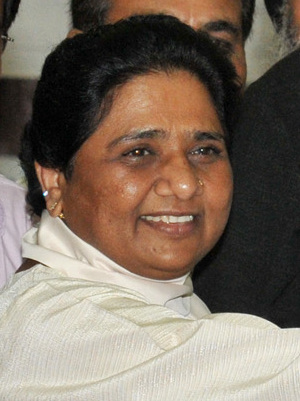

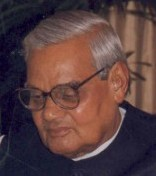

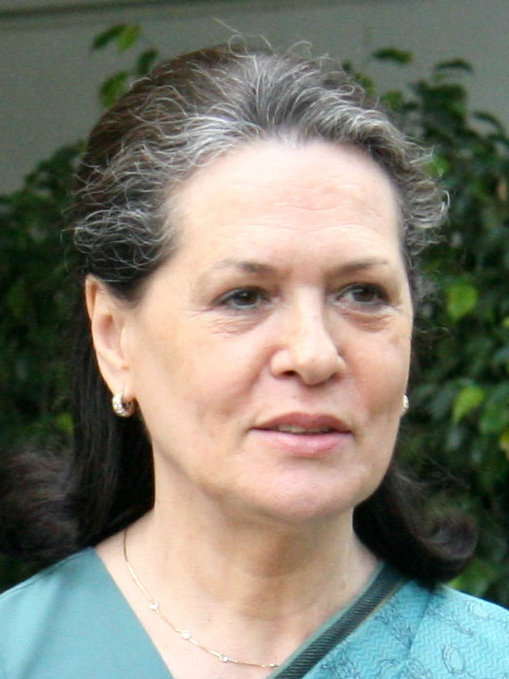

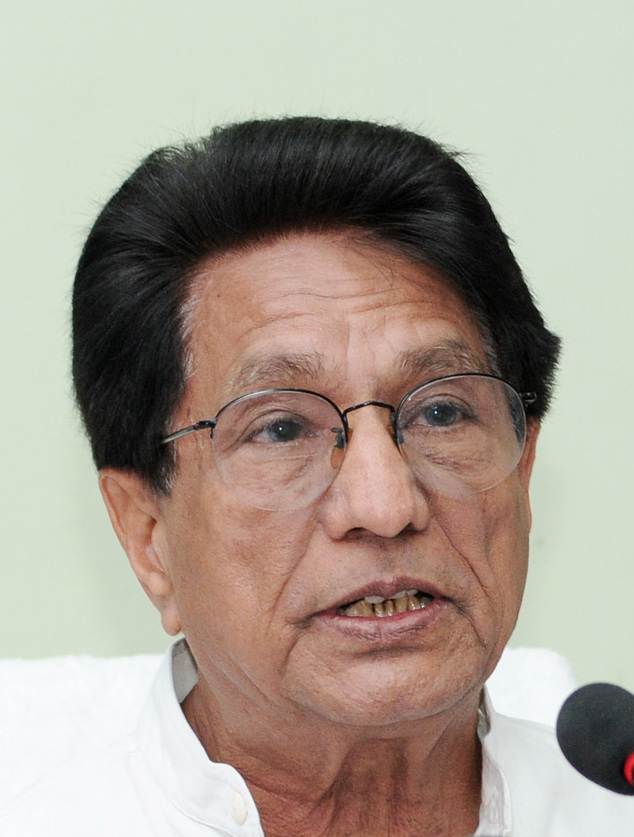
	First party	Second party	Third party
Leader	Mulayam Singh Yadav	Mayawati	Atal Bihari Vajpayee
Party	SP	BSP	BJP
Leader's seat	Mainpuri	Akbarpur	Lucknow
Last election	26	14	29
Seats won	35	19	10
Seat change	▲9	▲5	▼19
Percentage	26.74%	24.67%	22.17%
Swing	▲2.68%	▲2.59%	▼5.47%
	Fourth party	Fifth party
Leader	Sonia Gandhi	Ajit Singh
Party	INC	RLD
Leader's seat	Raebareli	Baghpat
Last election	10	2
Seats won	9	3
Seat change	▼1	▲1
Percentage	12.04%	4.49%
Swing	▼2.68%	▲2.00%
Prime Minister before election
Atal Bihari Vajpayee
BJP
Prime Minister after election
Manmohan Singh
INC

The 2004 Indian general election in Uttar Pradesh were held between 26 April and 10 May 2004 for the 14th Lok Sabha. The election results were declared on 13 May in which the national parties the BJP and the Congress performed quite badly while the state parties, SP and BSP did very well and fetched majority of the seats. Early polls called by the BJP proved disastrous for the party, although Congress managed to win and form the government at the national level.

== Preparation by the Election Commission ==
The election commission had appointed its total of 240 observers in the state in view of the preparations.

The filing of nomination along with voting was carried by the Election Commission in three days as:

Poll event	Phase		
Poll event	I	II	III
Notification date	31 March 2004	8 April 2004	16 April 2004
Last date for filing the nomination	7 April 2004	15 April 2004	23 April 2004
Date of Scrutiny	8 April 2004	16 April 2004	24 April 2004
Last date for withdrawal of nomination	10 April 2004	19 April 2004	26 April 2004
Date of poll	26 April 2004	5 May 2004	10 May 2004
Date of counting	13 May 2004		

Voting Phases
I (32 seats)	II (30 seats)	III (18 seats)
Rae Bareli; Pratapgarh; Amethi; Sultanpur; Akbarpur; Faizabad; Bara Banki; Kaiserganj; Bahraich; Balrampur; Gonda; Basti; Domariaganj; Khalilabad; Bansgaon; Gorakhpur; Maharajganj; Padrauna; Deoria; Salempur; Ballia; Ghosi; Azamgarh; Lalganj; Machhlishahr; Jaunpur; Saidpur; Ghazipur; Chandauli; Varanasi; Robertsganj; Mirzapur	Kheri; Shahabad; Sitapur; Misrikh; Hardoi; Lucknow; Mohanlalganj; Unnao; Phulpur; Allahabad; Chail; Fatehpur; Banda; Hamirpur; Jhansi; Jalaun; Ghatampur; Bilhaur; Kanpur; Etawah; Kannauj; Farrukhabad; Mainpuri; Jalesar; Etah; Firozabad; Agra; Mathura; Hathras; Aligarh	Bijnor; Amroha; Moradabad; Rampur; Sambhal; Budaun; Aonla; Bareilly; Pilibhit; Shahjahanpur; Khurja; Bulandshahr; Hapur; Meerut; Baghpat; Muzaffarnagar; Kairana; Saharanpur

Further the affidavits were filed by the contesting candidates from each seat respectively which were submitted to the Election Commission as mandated.

== Campaigning and Seat Alliances ==
The BJP in its party manifesto included building Lord Ram temple in Ayodhya as a part of 'Vision Document'. The party had hoped that section of the public would believe there is no alternate to PM Vajpayee with the slogan: Kaho dil se, Atal phir se and would ultimately help in certain seats.

The table shows seat allotments alliance and party wise:

Alliance/Party		Flag	Symbol	Seats contested	
National Democratic Alliance	Bharatiya Janata Party			77	80
National Democratic Alliance	JD(U)			3	80
SP+	Samajwadi Party			70	80
SP+	Rashtriya Lok Dal			10	80
INC+	Indian National Congress			73	76
INC+	Lok Janshakti Party			3	76
Third Front	Communist Party of India (Marxist)			2	8
Third Front	Communist Party of India			6	8

The BSP had contested all the 80 Lok Sabha seats in the state.

== List of Candidates ==
Constituency		SP+		BSP		NDA		UPA	
#	Name	Party	Candidate	Party	Candidate	Party	Candidate	Party	Candidate
1	Bijnor (SC)	RLD	Munshiram Singh	BSP	Ghan Shyam Kharwar	BJP	Sheeshram Singh Ravi	INC	Jiraj Singh
2	Amroha	RLD	Mahmood Madani	BSP	Aley Hasan	BJP	Chetan Chauhan	INC	Vikram Singh
3	Moradabad	SP	Shafiqur Rahman Barq	BSP	Iftakar Md. Khan	BJP	Chandra Vijay Singh		
4	Rampur	SP	Jaya Prada	BSP	Afroz Ali Khan	BJP	Rajendra Sharma	INC	Begum Noor Bano
5	Sambhal	SP	Ram Gopal Yadav	BSP	Tarannum Aqeel	BJP	Omveer Singh	INC	Ashok Yadav
6	Budaun	SP	Saleem Shervani	BSP	Prem Pal Singh Yadav	BJP	Brijpal Singh Shakya	INC	Mhb. Husain Ansari
7	Aonla	SP	Rajveer Singh	BSP	Sudhir Kumar Maurya	JD(U)	Sarvraj Singh	INC	Alauddeen Khan
8	Bareilly	SP	Islam Sabir	BSP	Akbar Ahmad Dumpy	BJP	Santosh Gangwar	INC	Praveen Singh Aron
9	Pilibhit	SP	Satyapal Gangwar	BSP	Anis Ahmad Khan	BJP	Maneka Gandhi	INC	V. M. Singh
10	Shahjahanpur	SP	Rammurti Singh Verma	BSP	Satyapal Singh Yadav	BJP	Suresh Kumar Khanna	INC	Jitin Prasada
11	Kheri	SP	Ravi Prakash Verma	BSP	Daud Ahmad	BJP	Vinay Katiyar	INC	Rai Singh
12	Shahabad	SP	Babu Khan	BSP	Iliyas Azmi	BJP	Satya Dev Singh	INC	Mradul Shukla
13	Sitapur	SP	Mukhtar Anis	BSP	Rajesh Verma	BJP	Janardan Ps. Mishra	INC	Raja Mohd. Amir
14	Misrikh (SC)	SP	Sushila Saroj	BSP	Ashok Kumar Rawat	BJP	Paragi Lal Chau	INC	Ram Lal Rahi
15	Hardoi (SC)	SP	Usha Verma	BSP	Shiv Prasad Verma	BJP	Anita Verma	INC	Chand Ram
16	Lucknow	SP	Madhu Gupta	BSP	Nasir Ali Siddiqui	BJP	Atal Bihari Vajpayee		
17	Mohanlalganj (SC)	SP	Jai Prakash	BSP	Radhe Lal	BJP	Mast Ram	INC	Reena Choudhary
18	Unnao	SP	Deepak Kumar	BSP	Brajesh Pathak	BJP	Devi Bux Singh	INC	Shivpal Singh Yadav
19	Rae Bareli	SP	Ashok Kumar Singh	BSP	Rajesh Yadav	BJP	Girish Narayan Panday	INC	Sonia Gandhi
20	Pratapgarh	SP	Akshay Pratap Singh	BSP	Shiv Prakash Mishra	BJP	Rama Shankar Singh	INC	Ratna Singh
21	Amethi			BSP	Chandra Parkash Mishra	BJP	Ram Vilashdas	INC	Rahul Gandhi
22	Sultanpur	SP	Shailendra Pratap Singh	BSP	Mohd. Tahir	BJP	Veena Pandey	INC	Satish Sharma
23	Akbarpur (SC)	SP	Shankhlal Majhi	BSP	Mayawati	BJP	Triveni Ram	INC	Jaisraj Gautam
24	Faizabad	SP	Ashok Kumar Singh	BSP	Mitrasen Yadav	BJP	Lallu Singh	INC	Nirmal Khatri
25	Bara Banki (SC)	SP	Ram Sagar	BSP	Kamla Prasad	BJP	Ram Rawat	INC	Anand P. Gautam
26	Kaiserganj	SP	Beni Prasad Verma	BSP	Fareed Mahfooz	BJP	Arif Md. Khan	INC	Gyanendra Singh
27	Bahraich	SP	Rubab Sayeda	BSP	Bhagat Ram Mishra	BJP	Padamsen Ch.	INC	D. R. Abdul R. Khan
28	Balrampur	SP	Dr. Mohd Umar	BSP	Rizwan Zaheer	BJP	Brij Bhushan Singh	INC	Ekbal Siddiqui
29	Gonda	SP	Kirti Vardhan Singh	BSP	Fazlul Bari	BJP	Ghan Shyam Shukla	INC	Vinay Kumar Pandey
30	Basti (SC)	SP	Ratnakar Dhusiya	BSP	Lal Mani Prasad	BJP	Sriram Chauhan	INC	Umed Singh
31	Domariaganj	SP	Brij Bhushan Tiwari	BSP	Mohammed Muqueem	BJP	Ram Pal Singh	INC	Jagdambika Pal
32	Khalilabad	SP	Bhishma Tiwari	BSP	Bhalchandra Yadava	BJP	Ram Chaudhary		
33	Bansgaon (SC)	SP	Subhawati Paswan	BSP	Sadal Prasad	BJP	Raj Narayan	INC	Mahaveer Prasad
34	Gorakhpur	SP	Jamuna Nishad	BSP	Pradeep Kumar Nishad	BJP	Yogi Adityanath	INC	Shardendu Pandey
35	Maharajganj	SP	Akhilesh	BSP	Talat Ajiz	BJP	Pankaj	INC	Harsh Vardhan
36	Padrauna	SP	Ram Aawad Yadav	BSP	N. P. Kushwaha	BJP	Ram Nagina Mishra	INC	Ratanjit Pratap
37	Deoria	SP	Mohan Singh	BSP	Devi Prasad	BJP	Sriprakash Mani	INC	Ramashish Rai
38	Salempur	SP	Harikeval Prasad	BSP	Ramashankar Rajbhar	JD(U)	Rajdhari	INC	Bhola Pandey
39	Ballia			BSP	Kapildeo Yadav	BJP	Parmatma Nand Tiwari		
40	Ghosi	SP	Chandradeo Rajbhar	BSP	Bal Krishna	BJP	Bharat Lal Rahi	INC	Sudha Rai
41	Azamgarh	SP	Durga Prasad Yadav	BSP	Ramakant Yadav	BJP	Shah Mohammad	INC	Ram Naresh Yadav
42	Lalganj (SC)	SP	Daroga Saroj	BSP	Dr. Baliram	BJP	Kalpnath	LJP	Deepchandra Visharad
43	Machhlishahr	SP	Chandra Nath Singh	BSP	Umakant Yadav	BJP	Keshari Tripathi	INC	Deovrat Mishra
44	Jaunpur	SP	Parasnath Yadav	BSP	Om Prakash Dubey	BJP	Chinmayanand	LJP	Dhananjay Singh
45	Saidpur (SC)	SP	Tufani Saroj	BSP	R. A. Prasad	BJP	Vidyasagar	INC	Mata Prasad
46	Ghazipur	SP	Afzal Ansari	BSP	Uma Shankar	BJP	Manoj Sinha	INC	Shivprakash
47	Chandauli	SP	Ananda Maurya	BSP	Kailash Yadav	BJP	Shashikant Rajbhar	INC	Ashok Singh
48	Varanasi	SP	Anjana Prakash	BSP	Amir Chand Patel	BJP	Shankar Jaiswal	INC	Rajesh Mishra
49	Robertsganj (SC)	SP	Pakaudi Lal Kol	BSP	Lalchandra	BJP	Ram Shakal	INC	Brij K. Kanaujiya
50	Mirzapur	SP	Sharda Prasad	BSP	Narendra Kushwaha	BJP	Virendra Singh	INC	Rajesh Pati Tripathi
51	Phulpur	SP	Atiq Ahmed	BSP	Keshari Patel	BJP	Beni Madhav Bind	INC	Ram Pujan Patel
52	Allahabad	SP	Rewati Raman	BSP	R. K. Singh Patel	BJP	Murli Joshi	INC	Satya Malaviya
53	Chail (SC)	SP	Shailendra Kumar	BSP	Vachaspati	BJP	Amrit Lal Bharti	LJP	Shashi Prakash
54	Fatehpur	SP	Achal Singh	BSP	Mahendra Nishad	BJP	Ashok Patel	INC	Khan Gufran Jahidi
55	Banda	SP	Shyama Charan Gupt	BSP	Ram Sajeevan	BJP	Bhairon Prasad Mishra	INC	Prakash Narain
56	Hamirpur	SP	Rajju Mahraj	BSP	Ashok Kumar Chandel	BJP	Surendra Pal Singh	INC	Gangacharan Rajput
57	Jhansi	SP	Chandrapal Yadav	BSP	Babu Lal Kushwaha	BJP	Rajendra Agnihotri	INC	Rajendra Pratap
58	Jalaun (SC)	SP	Ghanshyam Kori	BSP	Brijlal Khabri	BJP	Bhanu Pratap Verma	INC	Nathuram Verma
59	Ghatampur (SC)	SP	Radhey Shyam Kori	BSP	Pyare Lal Sankhwar	BJP	Kamal Rani	INC	Askaran Sankhwar
60	Bilhaur	SP	Lal Singh Tomar	BSP	Raja Ram Pal	BJP	Shyam Misra	INC	Madan Mohan Shukla
61	Kanpur	SP	Haji Mushtaq Solanki	BSP	Anubhav	BJP	Satyadev Pachauri	INC	Sriprakash Jaiswal
62	Etawah	SP	Raghuraj Shakya	BSP	Sudheendra Bhadaurya	BJP	Sarita Bhadauria	INC	Rajendra Prasad
63	Kannauj	SP	Akhilesh Yadav	BSP	Th. Rajesh Singh	BJP	Ramanand Yadav	INC	Vinay Kumar Shukla
64	Farrukhabad	SP	Chandra Singh	BSP	Nagendra Singh Shakya	BJP	Mukesh Rajput	INC	Louise Khurshid
65	Mainpuri	SP	Mulayam Singh Yadav	BSP	Ashok Shakya	BJP	Balram Yadav	INC	Rajendra Singh Jadon
66	Jalesar	SP	S. P. Singh Baghel	BSP	Updesh Singh Chauhan	BJP	Pratyendra Pal Singh	INC	Shivraj Singh Yadav
67	Etah	SP	Devendra Singh Yadav	BSP	Ramgopal Shakya	BJP	Ashok Ratan Shakya	INC	Ravindr
68	Firozabad (SC)	SP	Ramji Lal Suman	BSP	Biresh Kumar	BJP	Kishori Lal Mahaur	INC	Shivnarain Gautam
69	Agra	SP	Raj Babbar	BSP	Pandit Keshav Dixit	BJP	Murari Lal Mittal	INC	Surendra Singh
70	Mathura	RLD	Dr. Gyanvati Singh	BSP	Laxmi Narayan Ch.	BJP	Ch. Tejveer Singh	INC	Manvendra Singh
71	Hathras (SC)	SP	Vimla Pal	BSP	Ramvir Bhaiyaji	BJP	Kishan Lal Diler	INC	Mukesh Kumar
72	Aligarh	RLD	Dalveer Singh	BSP	Thakur Jaivir	BJP	Sheela Gautam	INC	Bijendra Singh
73	Khurja (SC)	RLD	Ram Niwas Balmiki	BSP	Ravi Gautam	BJP	Ashok Pradhan	INC	Devi Dayal
74	Bulandshahr	RLD	Badrul Islam	BSP	Devendra Bhardwaj	BJP	Kalyan Singh	INC	Chandra Skr. Sharma
75	Hapur	RLD	Trilok Tyagi	BSP	Kunwar Ayyub Ali	BJP	Ramesh Tomar	INC	Surendra Goel
76	Meerut	RLD	Malook Nagar	BSP	Md. Shahid Akhlaq	JD(U)	K. C. Tyagi	INC	K. K. Sharma
77	Baghpat	RLD	Ajit Singh	BSP	Aulad Ali	BJP	Satya Pal Malik	INC	Jagveer
78	Muzaffarnagar	SP	Munawwar Hasan	BSP	Suratsingh Verma	BJP	Amar Pal Singh	INC	S. Saiduzzaman
79	Kairana	RLD	Anuradha Chd.	BSP	Shahnawaz	BJP	Amarkant Rana	INC	Subhash Maheshwari
80	Saharanpur	SP	Rasheed Masood	BSP	Mansoor Ali Khan	BJP	Ch. Yashpal Singh	INC	Tara Ch. Shastri

== Voting ==
The total voting percentage was recorded at 48.16 for all the three phases with 11,06,24,490 electorate casting their votes. 63 seats were reserved for the general caste while remaining 17 for the Scheduled Castes and Scheduled Tribes.

== Results Party/Alliance Wise ==
The biggest gainer in the election was the Samajwadi Party which alone won 35 seats and its alliance partner RLD won 3 seats in western Uttar Pradesh. The SP alliance won almost half the seats from the state. SP leader Mulayam Singh Yadav won from Mainpuri by a huge difference.

Perhaps the biggest loser was the BJP which was reduced to just 10 seats from previous 25 seats in 1999 general election from the state even though Vajpayee won comfortably from Lucknow. Important state party leaders Maneka Gandhi and Yogi Adityanath were elected from Pilibhit and Gorakhpur respectively. The party's India Shining campaign backfired badly for the party and they lost a substantial number of seats.

Another national party Congress did not gained in the state and was limited to just 9 seats although their national party leaders Sonia Gandhi and Rahul Gandhi won from Raebareli and Amethi.

The BSP registered its victory in 19 seats.

Vote share Party wise
1. SP (26.7%)
2. BSP (24.7%)
3. BJP (22.2%)
4. INC (12.0%)
5. RLD (4.49%)
6. IND (3.81%)
7. Others (6.08%)
Seats Party wise
1. SP (43.8%)
2. BSP (23.8%)
3. BJP (12.5%)
4. INC (11.2%)
5. RLD (3.75%)
6. IND (1.25%)
7. Others (3.75%)

=== Results by Party/Alliance ===
Alliance/ Party		Popular vote			Seats		
Alliance/ Party		Votes	%	±pp	Contested	Won	+/−
SP+	SP	1,42,43,280	26.74	▲2.68	68	35	▲9
SP+	RLD	23,91,825	4.49	▲2.00	10	3	▲1
SP+	Total	1,66,35,105	31.23	Steady	78	38	Steady
BSP		1,31,39,200	24.67	▲2.59	80	19	▲5
NDA	BJP	1,18,10,187	22.17	▼5.47	77	10	▼19
NDA	JD(U)	4,25,460	0.80	▲0.21	3	1	▲1
NDA	Total	1,22,35,647	22.97	Steady	80	11	Steady
INC+	INC	64,12,293	12.04	▼2.68	73	9	▼1
INC+	LJP	1,50,545	0.28	Steady	3	0	Steady
INC+	Total	65,62,838	12.32	Steady	76	9	Steady
NLP		3,20,407	0.60	▲0.37	7	1	▲1
SJP(R)		2,71,563	0.51	▲0.05	2	1	Steady
AD		7,24,475	1.36	▼0.19	57	0	Steady
SBSP		2,58,628	0.49	Steady	13	0	Steady
Others		10,90,270	2.01	Steady	264	0	Steady
IND		20,31,483	3.81	▲0.19	481	1	▲1
Total		5,32,69,616	100%	-	1138	80	-

== Constituency Wise Results ==
The detailed results per seat wise based on winning candidates is mentioned in table below:

35	19	10	9	3	4
SP	BSP	BJP	INC	RLD	IND and Others

Constituency		Winner				Runner Up				Margin	%
#	Name	Candidate	Party	Votes	%	Candidate	Party	Votes	%	Margin	%
1	Bijnor (SC)	Munshiram	RLD	301,599	42.74	Ghan Shyam Chandr Kharwar	BSP	221,424	31.37	80,175	11.36
2	Amroha	Harish Nagpal	IND	287,522	32.48	Mahmood Madni	RLD	269,638	30.46	17,884	2.02
3	Moradabad	Shafiqur Rahman Barq	SP	218,079	33.29	Chandra Vijay Singh	BJP	182,239	27.82	35,840	5.47
4	Rampur	Jaya Prada	SP	289,390	35.70	Noor Bano	INC	203,916	25.16	85,474	10.54
5	Sambhal	Ram Gopal Yadav	SP	357,049	47.02	Tarannum Aqeel	BSP	158,988	20.94	198,061	26.08
6	Budaun	Saleem Iqbal Shervani	SP	265,713	45.04	Brijpal Singh Shakya	BJP	214,391	36.34	51,322	8.70
7	Aonla	Kunwar Sarvraj Singh	JD(U)	153,322	28.58	Rajveer Singh	SP	146,451	27.30	6,871	1.28
8	Bareilly	Santosh Gangwar	BJP	269,651	32.77	Akbar Ahmed Dempi	BSP	210,007	25.52	59,644	7.25
9	Pilibhit	Maneka Gandhi	BJP	255,615	37.75	Satyapal Gangwar	SP	152,895	22.58	102,720	15.17
10	Shahjahanpur	Jitin Prasada	INC	220,763	34.83	Rammurti Singh Verma	SP	138,931	21.92	81,832	12.91
11	Kheri	Ravi Prakash Verma	SP	224,602	31.78	Daud Ahmad	BSP	212,842	30.12	11,760	1.66
12	Shahabad	Iliyas Azmi	BSP	210,171	36.26	Satya Dev Singh	BJP	163,802	28.26	46,369	8.00
13	Sitapur	Rajesh Verma	BSP	171,733	28.79	Mukhtar Anees	SP	166,499	27.91	5,234	0.88
14	Misrikh (SC)	Ashok Kumar Rawat	BSP	207,062	37.59	Sushila Saroj	SP	187,659	34.07	19,403	3.52
15	Hardoi (SC)	Usha Verma	SP	203,445	38.97	Shiv Prasad Verma	BSP	164,242	31.46	39,203	7.51
16	Lucknow	Atal Bihari Vajpayee	BJP	324,714	56.12	Madhu Gupta	SP	106,339	18.38	218,375	37.74
17	Mohanlalganj (SC)	Jai Prakash	SP	148,578	25.98	Radhe Lal	BSP	146,010	25.53	2,568	0.45
18	Unnao	Brajesh Pathak	BSP	178,366	32.57	Deepak Kumar	SP	160,605	29.33	17,761	3.24
19	Rae Bareli	Sonia Gandhi	INC	378,107	58.75	Ashok Kumar Singh	SP	128,342	19.94	249,765	38.81
20	Pratapgarh	Akshay Pratap Singh	SP	238,137	41.59	Rajkumari Ratna Singh	INC	168,865	29.49	69,272	12.10
21	Amethi	Rahul Gandhi	INC	390,179	66.18	Chandra Parkash Mishra	BSP	99,326	16.85	290,853	49.33
22	Sultanpur	Mohd. Tahir	BSP	261,564	36.28	Shailendra Pratap Singh	SP	159,754	22.16	101,810	14.12
23	Akbarpur (SC)	Mayawati	BSP	325,019	43.83	Shankh Lal Manjhi	SP	266,750	35.97	58,269	7.86
24	Faizabad	Mitrasen	BSP	207,285	30.19	Lallu Singh	BJP	173,799	25.31	33,486	4.88
25	Bara Banki (SC)	Kamla Prasad	BSP	196,370	36.35	Ram Sagar	SP	175,448	32.48	20,922	3.87
26	Kaiserganj	Beni Prasad Verma	SP	219,920	38.59	Arif Mohammad Khan	BJP	207,260	36.36	12,660	2.22
27	Bahraich	Rubab Sayeda	SP	188,949	34.38	Bhagat Ram Mishra	BSP	162,615	29.59	26,334	4.79
28	Balrampur	Brij Bhushan Singh	BJP	270,941	38.81	Rizwan Zaheer	BSP	218,328	31.27	52,613	7.54
29	Gonda	Kirti Vardhan Singh	SP	251,947	41.53	Ghan Shyam Shukla	BJP	214,949	35.43	36,998	6.10
30	Basti (SC)	Lal Mani Prasad	BSP	155,223	26.93	Sriram Chauhan	BJP	129,849	22.53	25,374	4.40
31	Domariaganj	Mohd. Muqueem	BSP	202,544	31.49	Jagdambika Pal	INC	149,642	23.27	52,902	8.23
32	Khalilabad	Bhalchandra Yadava	BSP	234,712	33.50	Bhishma Shankar Tiwari	SP	207,689	29.64	27,023	3.86
33	Bansgaon (SC)	Mahaveer Prasad	INC	180,388	28.54	Sadal Prasad	BSP	163,947	25.94	16,441	2.60
34	Gorakhpur	Yogi Adityanath	BJP	353,647	51.31	Jamuna Nishad	SP	211,608	30.70	142,039	20.61
35	Maharajganj	Pankaj	BJP	228,702	30.63	Akhilesh	SP	163,903	21.95	64,799	8.68
36	Padrauna	Baleshwar Yadav	NLP	206,850	26.18	Ratanjit Pratap Narain Singh	INC	198,428	25.12	8,422	1.07
37	Deoria	Mohan Singh	SP	237,664	32.57	Sriprakash Mani	BJP	185,438	25.41	52,226	7.16
38	Salempur	Harikeval Prasad	SP	195,570	29.21	Bhola Pandey	INC	179,317	26.78	16,253	2.43
39	Ballia	Chandra Shekhar	SJP	270,136	43.59	Kapildeo Yadav	BSP	189,082	30.51	81,054	13.08
40	Ghosi	Chandradeo Prasad	SP	201,468	27.92	Bal Krishna	BSP	180,456	25.01	21,012	2.91
41	Azamgarh	Ramakant Yadav	BSP	258,216	36.30	Durga Prasad Yadav	SP	251,248	35.32	6,968	0.98
42	Lalganj (SC)	Daroga Prasad Saroj	SP	283,473	37.12	Dr. Baliram	BSP	240,742	31.53	42,731	5.60
43	Machhlishahr	Umakant Yadav	BSP	237,438	35.10	Chandra Nath Singh	SP	182,056	26.92	55,382	8.19
44	Jaunpur	Parasnath Yadava	SP	219,614	30.80	Om Prakash Dubey	BSP	192,489	27.00	27,125	3.80
45	Saidpur (SC)	Tufani Saroj	SP	231,989	32.61	R A Prasad	BSP	202,179	28.42	29,810	4.19
46	Ghazipur	Afajal Ansari	SP	415,687	47.82	Manoj	BJP	188,910	21.73	226,777	26.09
47	Chandauli	Kailash Nath Singh Yadav	BSP	204,625	29.05	Anand Ratna Maurya	SP	202,956	28.81	1,669	0.24
48	Varanasi	Dr. Rajesh Kumar Mishra	INC	206,904	32.68	Shankar Prasad Jaiswal	BJP	149,468	23.61	57,436	9.07
49	Robertsganj (SC)	Lalchandra	BSP	189,521	26.15	Pakauri Lal	SP	179,159	24.72	10,362	1.43
50	Mirzapur	Narendra Kumar Kushwaha	BSP	201,942	27.74	Veerendra Singh	BJP	165,530	22.74	36,412	5.00
51	Phulpur	Atique Ahamad	SP	265,432	35.15	Keshari Devi Patel	BSP	201,085	26.63	64,347	8.52
52	Allahabad	Kunwar Rewati Singh	SP	234,008	35.64	Murli Manohar Joshi	BJP	205,625	31.32	28,383	4.32
53	Chail (SC)	Shailendra Kumar	SP	196,206	35.33	Vachaspati	BSP	195,576	35.22	630	0.11
54	Fatehpur	Mahendra Prasad Nishad	BSP	163,568	32.28	Achal Singh	SP	111,000	21.91	52,568	10.37
55	Banda	Shyama Charan Gupt	SP	185,099	35.17	Ram Sajeevan	BSP	128,795	24.47	56,304	10.70
56	Hamirpur	Rajnarayan	SP	220,917	36.57	Ashok Kumar Singh	BSP	183,763	30.42	37,154	6.15
57	Jhansi	Chandrapal Singh Yadav	SP	238,782	29.13	Babu Lal Kushwaha	BSP	212,483	25.92	26,299	3.21
58	Jalaun (SC)	Bhanu Pratap Singh	BJP	195,228	33.67	Ghanshyam Kori	SP	168,437	29.05	26,791	4.62
59	Ghatampur (SC)	Radhey Shyam Kori	SP	160,117	31.72	Pyarelal Sankhwar	BSP	149,805	29.68	10,312	2.04
60	Bilhaur	Raja Ram Pal	BSP	223,195	34.80	Lal Singh Tomar	SP	198,793	30.99	24,402	3.80
61	Kanpur	Shriprakash Jaiswal	INC	211,109	34.12	Satya Dev Pachauri	BJP	205,471	33.21	5,638	0.91
62	Etawah	Raghuraj Singh Shakya	SP	367,807	52.25	Sarita Bhadauria	BJP	177,650	25.24	190,157	27.01
63	Kannauj	Akhilesh Yadav	SP	464,367	61.21	Th. Rajesh Singh	BSP	156,994	20.69	307,373	40.52
64	Farrukhabad	Chandra Bhushan Singh	SP	176,129	26.47	Louise Khurshid	INC	173,384	26.06	2,745	0.41
65	Mainpuri	Mulayam Singh Yadav	SP	460,470	63.96	Ashok Shakya	BSP	122,600	17.03	337,870	46.93
66	Jalesar	Pro. S.P Singh Baghel	SP	287,091	44.14	Pratyendra Pal Singh	BJP	181,023	27.83	106,068	16.31
67	Etah	Ku. Devendra Singh Yadav	SP	276,156	47.04	Ashok Ratan Shakya	BJP	224,821	38.29	51,335	8.74
68	Firozabad (SC)	Ram Ji Lal Suman	SP	212,383	39.97	Kishori Lal Mahaur	BJP	157,595	29.66	54,788	10.31
69	Agra	Raj Babbar	SP	243,094	37.82	Murari Lal Mittal Fatehpuria	BJP	185,752	28.90	57,342	8.92
70	Mathura	Manvendra Singh	INC	187,400	31.12	Choudhary Laxminarayan	BSP	149,268	24.79	38,132	6.33
71	Hathras (SC)	Kishan Lal Diler	BJP	175,049	35.57	Ram Vir Singh Bhaiyaji	BSP	152,212	30.93	22,837	4.64
72	Aligarh	Bijendra Singh	INC	167,142	26.38	Sheela Gautam	BJP	164,351	25.94	2,791	0.44
73	Khurja (SC)	Ashok Kumar Pradhan	BJP	214,701	35.74	Ravi Gautam	BSP	173,551	28.89	41,150	6.85
74	Bulandshahr	Kalyan Singh	BJP	258,284	37.69	Badrul Islam	RLD	241,633	35.26	16,651	2.43
75	Hapur	Surendra Prakash Goyal	INC	235,114	29.40	Ramesh Chand Tomar	BJP	192,751	24.10	42,363	5.30
76	Meerut	Mohd. Shahid	BSP	252,518	36.20	Malook Nagar	RLD	183,182	26.26	69,336	9.94
77	Baghpat	Ajit Singh	RLD	353,181	53.76	Aulad Ali	BSP	132,543	20.18	220,638	33.59
78	Muzaffarnagar	Ch. Munawwar Hasan	SP	306,225	35.51	Amar Pal Singh	BJP	237,220	27.51	69,005	8.00
79	Kairana	Anuradha Choudhary	RLD	523,923	64.15	Shahnawaz	BSP	181,509	22.22	342,414	41.93
80	Saharanpur	Rasheed Masood	SP	353,272	35.67	Mansoor Ali Khan	BSP	326,444	32.96	26,828	2.71

== Bye-Elections Held ==
Constituency			Winner				Runner Up				Margin
No.	Name	Date	Candidate	Party	Votes	%	Candidate	Party	Votes	%	Margin
65	Mainpuri	October 2004	Dharmendra Yadav	SP	348,999	62.64	Ashok Shakya	BSP	169,286	30.39	179,713
65	Mainpuri	October 2004	The 2004 by-election for the Mainpuri Lok Sabha constituency in Uttar Pradesh was held to fill a vacancy created by the resignation of Mulayam Singh Yadav								
23	Akbarpur	October 2004	Shankhlal Majhi	SP	352,159	44.10	Tribhuvan Dutt	BSP	255,759	32.03	96,400
23	Akbarpur	October 2004	The Akbarpur Lok Sabha bypoll in 2004 was held to fill the vacancy caused by the resignation of the sitting MP, Mayawati.								
19	Rae Bareli	February 2006	Sonia Gandhi	INC	474,891	80.49	Raj Kumar	SP	57,003	9.66	417,888
19	Rae Bareli	February 2006	The Rae Bareli Lok Sabha bypoll was held following the resignation of the incumbent MP, Sonia Gandhi, after the seat was vacated due to the office-of-profit controversy.								
49	Roberts Ganj (SC)	May 2007	Bhai Lal	BSP	219,601	28.53	Pakaudi Lal Kol	SP	219,262	28.49	339
49	Roberts Ganj (SC)	May 2007	The Roberts Ganj Lok Sabha bypoll was held following the cessation of membership of the incumbent MP, Lal Chand.								
50	Mirzapur	May 2007	Ramesh Dube	BSP	233,482	33.94	Ram Rati Bind	SP	193,652	28.15	39,830
50	Mirzapur	May 2007	The Mirzapur Lok Sabha bypoll was held following the cessation of membership of the incumbent MP, N. K. Kushwaha.								
60	Bilhaur	May 2007	Anil Shukla Warsi	BSP	229,123	34.22	Lal Singh Tomar	SP	203,111	30.33	26,012
60	Bilhaur	May 2007	The by-election was necessary because the sitting Member of Parliament, Raja Ram Pal, was expelled from the Lok Sabha in December 2005 due to his involvement in the "cash for query" scam.								
39	Ballia	January 2008	Neeraj Shekhar	SP	295,786	54.60	Vinay Shankar Tiwari	BSP	164,450	30.36	131,286
39	Ballia	January 2008	The Ballia Lok Sabha bypoll was held following the vacancy caused by the death of the incumbent MP and former Prime Minister, Chandrashekhar.								
32	Khalilabad	April 2008	Bhishma Shankar Tiwari	BSP	218,393	37.49	Bhalchandra Yadava	SP	153,761	26.40	64,632
32	Khalilabad	April 2008	The Khalilabad Lok Sabha bypoll was held following the cessation of membership of the incumbent MP, Bhalchandra Yadav.								
41	Azamgarh	April 2008	Akbar Ahmad Dumpy	BSP	227,341	37.29	Ramakant Yadav	BJP	173,089	28.39	54,252
41	Azamgarh	April 2008	The Azamgarh Lok Sabha bypoll was held following the cessation of membership of the incumbent MP, Rama Kant Yadav.								

== Post-election Union Council of Ministers from Uttar Pradesh ==
#	Name	Constituency	Designation	Department	From	To	Party
1	Mahavir Prasad	Bansgaon (SC)	Cabinet Minister	Small Scale Industries; Agro and Rural Industries (Merged into MSME)	23 May 2004	9 May 2007	INC
1	Mahavir Prasad	Bansgaon (SC)	Cabinet Minister	Micro, Small and Medium Enterprise	9 May 2007	22 May 2009	INC
2	Shriprakash Jaiswal	Kanpur	MoS	Home Affairs	23 May 2004	22 May 2009	INC
3	Akhilesh Das	Rajya Sabha (Uttar Pradesh)	MoS	Steel	29 January 2006	6 April 2008	INC
4	Jitin Prasada	Shahjahanpur	MoS	Steel	6 April 2008	22 May 2009	INC

== Assembly segments-wise lead of parties ==
Party	Assembly segments	Position in Assembly (as of 2007 election)
Samajwadi Party	160	97
Bahujan Samaj Party	100	206
Bharatiya Janata Party	60	51
Indian National Congress	47	22
Rashtriya Lok Dal	22	10
Janata Dal (United)	4	1
Samajwadi Janata Party (Rashtriya)	3	0
National Loktantrik Party	2	0
Apna Dal	1	0
Others	4	16
Total	403	

== Post Result Analysis ==
The result showed that both the national parties, BJP and the Congress were rejected by the state voters with the opinion poll proved equally wrong. The state electorate seems to have upright rejected India shining slogan coined by the BJP owing to its dismal performance. The party downward slide continued in numbers way lower than what when it had registered the victory in more than 50 seats in the state in subsequent 1991, 1996 and 1998 elections. The decision for calling snap polls by the Vajpayee govt proved very costly for the party. The tally in the state was the lowest since 1989 election. Notable state BJP leaders including union ministers Murli Manohar Joshi and Swami Chinmayanand, state assembly speaker Keshari Nath Tripathi and Uttar Pradesh party unit chief Vinay Katiyar were all defeated. The Ram temple issue also did not help as its party candidate Laloo Singh was defeated at Faizabad by BSP's Mitrasen Yadav. The party failed to win even a single seat in Kashi (Varanasi) region which had 13 Lok Sabha seats. Another BJP prominent leader and ex-CM Kalyan Singh was able to win from Bulandshahr by a small margin of around 6500 votes but the party lost Aligarh, Singh's hometown to the Congress.

In spite of campaigning by Rahul Gandhi, the Congress party was restricted to only 9 seats. The Congress lost Rampur, Meerut, Pratapgarh and Muzaffarnagar, but for the first time in a decade made victories in Poorvanchal (eastern) region by capturing Varanasi and Bansgaon seats.

The regional party, SP did quite well in the state, particularly in the eastern region and winning seats in the Bundelkhand region where it previously went blank in 1999 election. The alliance with the RLD proved fruitful in the western UP where Muslim-Jat-Yadav combined voted for the SP-RLD alliance.

Apart from it BSP also performed well with consolidation of dalit votes resulting in winning 19 seats from 14 before even in absence of party leader Kanshi Ram and Mayawati taking the charge thereof. Party strategy of fielding a large number of Muslims and upper caste candidates proved to be beneficial for the party. Although the party had lost election deposit in 11 contesting seats.

It was also determined by 'Centre for the Study of Developing Societies' that the majority of the people did not voted keeping in mind the negative statements about their leader or parties to whom they are supporting.
