= Elections in Uttar Pradesh =

Overview of the procedure of elections in the Indian state of Uttar Pradesh

Uttar Pradesh

Election to legislative assembly constituencies of Uttar Pradesh is held every five years and conducted by Election commission of India whereas the election to local bodies of Uttar pradesh is conducted by the Election Commission of Uttar pradesh. Parliamentary constituencies and Legislative assembly constituencies are also called "Lok sabha seats" and "Vidhan sabha seats" respectively. There are 80 parliamentary constituencies and 403 legislative assembly constituency in Uttar Pradesh. The state has seen 17 Vidhan Sabha elections and 16 Lok Sabha elections since independence.

In India, elections to parliamentary constituencies and legislative assembly constituencies are conducted by Election Commission of India and elections to local bodies are conducted by the election commission of the respective state. It is the Election Commission of India who decides the delimitation (the redrawing of the boundaries of parliamentary or assembly constituencies to make sure that there are, as nearly as practicable, the same number of people in each constituency), reservation of seats and system of election with respect to parliamentary and assembly constituency elections.

== Lok Sabha elections ==
Parliamentary constituencies (Lok sabha seats) of Uttar Pradesh

The Lok Sabha is the directly elected lower house of the Parliament of India. As of 2019 there have been seventeen Lok Sabhas elected by the people of India. Uttar Pradesh has 80 Lok Sabha constituencies.

=== List of Constituencies ===
List of Lok Sabha constituencies in Uttar Pradesh
Constituency No.	Constituency	Reserved for (SC/ST/None)
1	Saharanpur	None
2	Kairana	None
3	Muzaffarnagar	None
4	Bijnor	None
5	Nagina	SC
6	Moradabad	None
7	Rampur	None
8	Sambhal	None
9	Amroha	None
10	Meerut	None
11	Baghpat	None
12	Ghaziabad	None
13	Gautam Buddha Nagar	None
14	Bulandshahr	SC
15	Aligarh	None
16	Hathras	SC
17	Mathura	None
18	Agra	SC
19	Fatehpur Sikri	None
20	Firozabad	None
21	Mainpuri	None
22	Etah	None
23	Badaun	None
24	Aonla	None
25	Bareilly	None
26	Pilibhit	None
27	Shahjahanpur	SC
28	Kheri	None
29	Dhaurahra	None
30	Sitapur	None
31	Hardoi	None
32	Misrikh	SC
33	Unnao	None
34	Mohanlalganj	SC
35	Lucknow	None
36	Rae Bareli	None
37	Amethi	None
38	Sultanpur	None
39	Pratapgarh	None
40	Farrukhabad	None
41	Etawah	SC
42	Kannauj	None
43	Kanpur Urban	None
44	Akbarpur	None
45	Jalaun	SC
46	Jhansi	None
47	Hamirpur	None
48	Banda	None
49	Fatehpur	None
50	Kaushambi	SC
51	Phulpur	None
52	Allahabad	None
53	Barabanki	SC
54	Faizabad	None
55	Ambedkar Nagar	None
56	Bahraich	SC
57	Kaiserganj	None
58	Shrawasti	None
59	Gonda	None
60	Domariyaganj	None
61	Basti	None
62	Sant Kabir Nagar	None
63	Maharajganj	None
64	Gorakhpur	None
65	Kushi Nagar	None
66	Deoria	None
67	Bansgaon	SC
68	Lalganj	SC
69	Azamgarh	None
70	Ghosi	None
71	Salempur	None
72	Ballia	None
73	Jaunpur	None
74	Machhlishahr	SC
75	Ghazipur	None
76	Chandauli	None
77	Varanasi	None
78	Bhadohi	None
79	Mirzapur	None
80	Robertsganj	SC

=== Partywise results ===
Uttar Pradesh parliamentary seats results
#	Lok sabha election Year	Total Seats	SP	INC	BJP	Others	PM elect	PM's Party
1	1st Lok Sabha (1951–52)	86	-	81	-	Party name / Seats won; SP / 2; HMS / 1; IND / 2	Jawaharlal Nehru	INC
2	2nd Lok Sabha (1957)	86	-	72	-	Party name / Seats won; PSP / 4; BJS / 1; CPI / 1; IND / 8	Jawaharlal Nehru	INC
3	3rd Lok Sabha (1962)	86	-	62	-	Party name / Seats won; JS / 7; IND / 5; SWA / 3; REP / 3; PSP / 2; CPI / 2; HMS / 1; SOC / 1	Jawaharlal Nehru	INC
4	4th Lok Sabha (1967)	85	-	48	-	Party name / Seats won; JS / 12; SSP / 8; IND / 7; CPI / 5; PSP / 2; CPM / 1; RPI / 1; SWA / 1	Indira Gandhi	INC
5	5th Lok Sabha (1971)	85	-	73	-	Party name / Seats won; BJS / 4; CPI / 3; IND / 2; Others / 1; NCO / 1; BKD / 1	Indira Gandhi	INC
6	6th Lok Sabha (1977)	85	-	-	-	Party name / Seats won; JP / 85	Morarji Desai	JP
7	7th Lok Sabha (1980)	85	-	50	-	Party name / Seats won; JNP(S) / 29; Others / 6	Indira Gandhi	INC
8	8th Lok Sabha (1984)	85	-	83	-	Party name / Seats won; LKD / 2	Rajiv Gandhi	INC
9	9th Lok Sabha (1989)	85	-	15	8	Party name / Seats won; JD / 54; BssP / 2; CPI / 2; IND / 2; HMS / 1; CPM / 1	V. P. Singh	JD
10	10th Lok Sabha (1991)	85	-	5	51	Party name / Seats won; JD / 22; JP / 4; BSP / 1; CPI / 1	P. V. Narasimha Rao	INC
11	11th Lok Sabha (1996)	85	16	5	52	Party name / Seats won; BSP / 6; AIIC(T) / 2; JD / 2; IND / 1; SAP / 1	Atal Bihari Vajpayee	BJP
12	12th Lok Sabha (1998)	85	19	-	59	Party name / Seats won; BSP / 4; SAP / 2; IND / 1; SJP(R) / 1	Atal Bihari Vajpayee	BJP
13	13th Lok Sabha (1999)	85	35	10	29	Party name / Seats won; BSP / 14; AIIC(T) / 2; RLD / 2; IND / 1; SJP(R) / 1	Atal Bihari Vajpayee	BJP
14	14th Lok Sabha (2004)	80	35	9	10	Party name / Seats won; BSP / 19; RLD / 3; IND / 1; JD(U) / 1; NLP / 1; SJP(R) / 1	Manmohan Singh	INC
15	15th Lok Sabha (2009)	80	22	22	10	Party name / Seats won; BSP / 20; RLD / 5; IND / 1	Manmohan Singh	INC
16	16th Lok Sabha (2014)	80	5	2	71	Party name / Seats won; AD(S) / 2	Narendra Modi	BJP
17	17th Lok Sabha (2019)	80	5	1	62	Party Name / Seats won; BSP / 10; AD(S) / 2	Narendra Modi	BJP
18	18th Lok Sabha (2024)	80	37	6	33	Party Name / Seats won; RLD / 2; AD(S) / 1; ASP(KR) / 1	Narendra Modi	BJP

=== Table of Uttar Pradesh Lok Sabha results ===
Election Year	Total Seats in Lok Sabha	Main Party	Principal Opposition Party	Party 3	Party 4	Party 5	Other Parties
1977	85	JP 85 / 85	INC 0 / 85	—N/a	—N/a	—N/a	—N/a
1980	85	INC 50 / 85	JD(S) 29 / 85	—N/a	—N/a	—N/a	—N/a
1984	85	INC 83 / 85	—N/a	—N/a	—N/a	—N/a	—N/a
1989	85	JD 54 / 85	INC 15 / 85	BJP 8 / 85	—N/a	—N/a	—N/a
1991	85	BJP 51 / 85	JD 22 / 85	INC 5 / 85	JP 4 / 85	BSP 1 / 85	—N/a
1996	85	BJP 52 / 85	SP 16 / 85	JD 6 / 85	INC 5 / 85	BSP 1 / 85	—N/a
1998	85	BJP 59 / 85	SP 19 / 85	BSP 4 / 85	INC 0 / 85	—N/a	—N/a
1999	85	SP 35 / 85	BJP 29 / 85	BSP 14 / 85	INC 10 / 85	—N/a	—N/a
2004	80	SP 35 / 80	BSP 19 / 80	BJP 10 / 80	INC 9 / 80	—N/a	—N/a
2009	80	SP 23 / 80	INC 21 / 80	BSP 20 / 80	BJP 10 / 80	RLD 5 / 80	—N/a
2014	80	BJP 71 / 80	SP 5 / 80	AD(S) 2 / 80	INC 2 / 80	BSP 0 / 80	—N/a
2019	80	BJP 64 / 80	BSP 10 / 80	SP 5 / 80	AD(S) 2 / 80	INC 1 / 80	—N/a
2024	80	SP 37 / 80	BJP 33 / 80	INC 6 / 80	RLD 2 / 80	AD(S) 1 / 80	—N/a

== Vidhan Sabha elections ==
2022 Uttar Pradesh Legislative Assembly election

Uttar Pradesh has 403 assembly constituencies. The Chief Minister of the state is elected by legislators of the political party or coalition commanding an assembly majority, and serves a five-year term with a provision of re-election. The Governor is the head of state, but his or her role is largely ceremonial.

=== List of legislative assembly constituencies ===
Every parliamentary constituency is composed of multiple state assembly constituencies. And electoral boundaries are different from administrative boundaries. For instance, electoral boundary of Agra parliamentary constituency is different from the district (administrative) boundary of Agra. Main: List of Assembly constituencies of Uttar Pradesh

List of 403 legislative assembly constituencies under 80 parliamentary constituencies
#	parliamentary constituency	legislative assembly constituency	reservation	district
1	Agra	Agra Cantt.	Scheduled Caste	Agra
2	Agra	Agra North		Agra
3	Agra	Agra South		Agra
4	Agra	Etmadpur		Agra
5	Agra	Jalesar	Scheduled Caste	Etah
6	Akbarpur	Akbarpur - Raniya		Kanpur Dehat
7	Akbarpur	Bithoor		Kanpur Nagar
8	Akbarpur	Ghatampur	Scheduled Caste	Kanpur Nagar
9	Akbarpur	Kalyanpur		Kanpur Nagar
10	Akbarpur	Maharajpur		Kanpur Nagar
11	Aligarh	Aligarh		Aligarh
12	Aligarh	Atrauli		Aligarh
13	Aligarh	Barauli		Aligarh
14	Aligarh	Khair	Scheduled Caste	Aligarh
15	Aligarh	Koil		Aligarh
16	Allahabad	Allahabad South		Allahabad
17	Allahabad	Bara	Scheduled Caste	Allahabad
18	Allahabad	Karachhana		Allahabad
19	Allahabad	Koraon	Scheduled Caste	Allahabad
20	Allahabad	Meja		Allahabad
21	Ambedkar Nagar	Akbarpur		Ambedkar Nagar
22	Ambedkar Nagar	Goshainganj		Faizabad
23	Ambedkar Nagar	Jalalpur		Ambedkar Nagar
24	Ambedkar Nagar	Katehari		Ambedkar Nagar
25	Ambedkar Nagar	Tanda		Ambedkar Nagar
26	Amethi	Amethi		Amethi
27	Amethi	Gauriganj		Amethi
28	Amethi	Jagdishpur	Scheduled Caste	Amethi
29	Amethi	Salon	Scheduled Caste	Raebareli
30	Amethi	Tiloi		Amethi
31	Amroha	Amroha		Amroha
32	Amroha	Dhanaura	Scheduled Caste	Amroha
33	Amroha	Garhmukteshwar		Hapur
34	Amroha	Hasanpur		Amroha
35	Amroha	Naugawan Sadat		Amroha
36	Aonla	Aonla		Bareilly
37	Aonla	Bithari Chainpur		Bareilly
38	Aonla	Dataganj		Budaun
39	Aonla	Faridpur	Scheduled Caste	Bareilly
40	Aonla	Shekhupur		Budaun
41	Azamgarh	Azamgarh		Azamgarh
42	Azamgarh	Gopalpur		Azamgarh
43	Azamgarh	Mehnagar	Scheduled Caste	Azamgarh
44	Azamgarh	Mubarakpur		Azamgarh
45	Azamgarh	Sagri		Azamgarh
46	Bagpat	Bagpat		Bagpat
47	Bagpat	Baraut		Bagpat
48	Bagpat	Chhaprauli		Bagpat
49	Bagpat	Modinagar		Ghaziabad
50	Bagpat	Siwalkhas		Meerut
51	Bahraich	Bahraich		Bahraich
52	Bahraich	Balha	Scheduled Caste	Bahraich
53	Bahraich	Mahasi		Bahraich
54	Bahraich	Matera		Bahraich
55	Bahraich	Nanpara		Bahraich
56	Ballia	Bairia		Ballia
57	Ballia	Ballia Nagar		Ballia
58	Ballia	Mohammadabad		Ghazipur
59	Ballia	Phephana		Ballia
60	Ballia	Zahoorabad		Ghazipur
61	Banda	Baberu		Banda
62	Banda	Banda		Banda
63	Banda	Chitrakoot		Chitrakoot
64	Banda	Manikpur		Chitrakoot
65	Banda	Naraini	Scheduled Caste	Banda
66	Bansgaon	Bansgaon	Scheduled Caste	Gorakhpur
67	Bansgaon	Barhaj		Deoria
68	Bansgaon	Chauri-Chaura		Gorakhpur
69	Bansgaon	Chillupar		Gorakhpur
70	Bansgaon	Rudrapur		Deoria
71	Barabanki	Barabanki		Barabanki
72	Barabanki	Haidergarh	Scheduled Caste	Barabanki
73	Barabanki	Kursi		Barabanki
74	Barabanki	Ram Nagar		Barabanki
75	Barabanki	Zaidpur	Scheduled Caste	Barabanki
76	Bareilly	Bareilly		Bareilly
77	Bareilly	Bareilly Cantt.		Bareilly
78	Bareilly	Bhojipura		Bareilly
79	Bareilly	Meerganj		Bareilly
80	Bareilly	Nawabganj		Bareilly
81	Basti	Basti Sadar		Basti
82	Basti	Harraiya		Basti
83	Basti	Kaptanganj		Basti
84	Basti	Mahadewa	Scheduled Caste	Basti
85	Basti	Rudhauli		Basti
86	Bhadohi	Aurai	Scheduled Caste	Bhadohi
87	Bhadohi	Bhadohi		Bhadohi
88	Bhadohi	Gyanpur		Bhadohi
89	Bhadohi	Handia		Allahabad
90	Bhadohi	Pratappur		Allahabad
91	Bijnor	Bijnor		Bijnor
92	Bijnor	Chandpur		Bijnor
93	Bijnor	Hastinapur	Scheduled Caste	Meerut
94	Bijnor	Meerapur		Muzaffarnagar
95	Bijnor	Purqazi	Scheduled Caste	Muzaffarnagar
96	Budaun	Badaun		Budaun
97	Budaun	Bilsi		Budaun
98	Budaun	Bisauli	Scheduled Caste	Budaun
99	Budaun	Gunnaur		Sambhal
100	Budaun	Sahaswan		Budaun
101	Bulandshahr	Anupshahr		Bulandshahr
102	Bulandshahr	Bulandshahr		Bulandshahr
103	Bulandshahr	Debai		Bulandshahr
104	Bulandshahr	Shikarpur		Bulandshahr
105	Bulandshahr	Syana		Bulandshahr
106	Chandauli	Ajagara	Scheduled Caste	Varanasi
107	Chandauli	Mughalsarai		Chandauli
108	Chandauli	Saiyadraja		Chandauli
109	Chandauli	Sakaldiha		Chandauli
110	Chandauli	Shivpur		Varanasi
111	Deoria	Deoria		Deoria
112	Deoria	Fazilnagar		Kushinagar
113	Deoria	Pathardeva		Deoria
114	Deoria	Rampur Karkhana		Deoria
115	Deoria	Tamkuhi Raj		Kushinagar
116	Dhaurahra	Dhaurahra		Lakhimpur Kheri
117	Dhaurahra	Hargaon	Scheduled Caste	Sitapur
118	Dhaurahra	Kasta	Scheduled Caste	Lakhimpur Kheri
119	Dhaurahra	Maholi		Sitapur
120	Dhaurahra	Mohammdi		Lakhimpur Kheri
121	Domariyaganj	Bansi		Siddharth Nagar
122	Domariyaganj	Domariyaganj		Siddharth Nagar
123	Domariyaganj	Itwa		Siddharth Nagar
124	Domariyaganj	Kapilvastu	Scheduled Caste	Siddharth Nagar
125	Domariyaganj	Shohratgarh		Siddharth Nagar
126	Etah	Amanpur		Kasganj
127	Etah	Etah		Etah
128	Etah	Kasganj		Kasganj
129	Etah	Marhara		Etah
130	Etah	Patiyali		Kasganj
131	Etawah	Auraiya	Scheduled Caste	Auraiya
132	Etawah	Bharthana	Scheduled Caste	Etawah
133	Etawah	Dibiyapur		Auraiya
134	Etawah	Etawah		Etawah
135	Etawah	Sikandra		Kanpur Dehat
136	Faizabad	Ayodhya		Faizabad
137	Faizabad	Bikapur		Faizabad
138	Faizabad	Dariyabad		Barabanki
139	Faizabad	Milkipur	Scheduled Caste	Faizabad
140	Faizabad	Rudauli		Faizabad
141	Farrukhabad	Aliganj		Etah
142	Farrukhabad	Amritpur		Farrukhabad
143	Farrukhabad	Bhojpur		Farrukhabad
144	Farrukhabad	Farrukhabad		Farrukhabad
145	Farrukhabad	Kaimganj	Scheduled Caste	Farrukhabad
146	Fatehpur	Ayah Shah		Fatehpur
147	Fatehpur	Bindki		Fatehpur
148	Fatehpur	Fatehpur		Fatehpur
149	Fatehpur	Husainganj		Fatehpur
150	Fatehpur	Jahanabad		Fatehpur
151	Fatehpur	Khaga	Scheduled Caste	Fatehpur
152	Fatehpur Sikri	Agra Rural	Scheduled Caste	Agra
153	Fatehpur Sikri	Bah		Agra
154	Fatehpur Sikri	Fatehabad		Agra
155	Fatehpur Sikri	Fatehpur Sikri		Agra
156	Fatehpur Sikri	Kheragarh		Agra
157	Firozabad	Firozabad		Firozabad
158	Firozabad	Jasrana		Firozabad
159	Firozabad	Shikohabad		Firozabad
160	Firozabad	Sirsaganj		Firozabad
161	Firozabad	Tundla	Scheduled Caste	Firozabad
162	Gautam Buddha Nagar	Dadri		Gautam Budh Nagar
163	Gautam Buddha Nagar	Jewar		Gautam Budh Nagar
164	Gautam Buddha Nagar	Khurja	Scheduled Caste	Bulandshahr
165	Gautam Buddha Nagar	Noida		Gautam Budh Nagar
166	Gautam Buddha Nagar	Sikandrabad		Bulandshahr
167	Ghaziabad	Dholana		Hapur
168	Ghaziabad	Ghaziabad		Ghaziabad
169	Ghaziabad	Loni		Ghaziabad
170	Ghaziabad	Muradnagar		Ghaziabad
171	Ghaziabad	Sahibabad		Ghaziabad
172	Ghazipur	Ghazipur		Ghazipur
173	Ghazipur	Jakhanian	Scheduled Caste	Ghazipur
174	Ghazipur	Jangipur		Ghazipur
175	Ghazipur	Saidpur	Scheduled Caste	Ghazipur
176	Ghazipur	Zamania		Ghazipur
177	Ghosi	Ghosi		Mau
178	Ghosi	Madhuban		Mau
179	Ghosi	Mau		Mau
180	Ghosi	Muhammadabad-Gohna	Scheduled Caste	Mau
181	Ghosi	Rasara		Ballia
182	Gonda	Gaura		Gonda
183	Gonda	Gonda		Gonda
184	Gonda	Mankapur	Scheduled Caste	Gonda
185	Gonda	Mehnaun		Gonda
186	Gonda	Utraula		Balrampur
187	Gorakhpur	Caimpiyarganj		Gorakhpur
188	Gorakhpur	Gorakhpur Rural		Gorakhpur
189	Gorakhpur	Gorakhpur Urban		Gorakhpur
190	Gorakhpur	Pipraich		Gorakhpur
191	Gorakhpur	Sahajanwa		Gorakhpur
192	Hamirpur	Charkhari		Mahoba
193	Hamirpur	Hamirpur		Hamirpur
194	Hamirpur	Mahoba		Mahoba
195	Hamirpur	Rath	Scheduled Caste	Hamirpur
196	Hamirpur	Tindwari		Banda
197	Hardoi	Gopamau	Scheduled Caste	Hardoi
198	Hardoi	Hardoi		Hardoi
199	Hardoi	Sandi	Scheduled Caste	Hardoi
200	Hardoi	Sawayazpur		Hardoi
201	Hardoi	Shahabad		Hardoi
202	Hathras	Chharra		Aligarh
203	Hathras	Hathras	Scheduled Caste	Hathras
204	Hathras	Iglas	Scheduled Caste	Aligarh
205	Hathras	Sadabad		Hathras
206	Hathras	Sikandra Rao		Hathras
207	Jalaun	Bhognipur		Kanpur Dehat
208	Jalaun	Garautha		Jhansi
209	Jalaun	Kalpi		Jalaun
210	Jalaun	Madhaugarh		Jalaun
211	Jalaun	Orai	Scheduled Caste	Jalaun
212	Jaunpur	Badlapur		Jaunpur
213	Jaunpur	Jaunpur		Jaunpur
214	Jaunpur	Malhani		Jaunpur
215	Jaunpur	Mungra Badshahpur		Jaunpur
216	Jaunpur	Shahganj		Jaunpur
217	Jhansi	Babina		Jhansi
218	Jhansi	Jhansi Nagar		Jhansi
219	Jhansi	Lalitpur		Lalitpur
220	Jhansi	Mauranipur	Scheduled Caste	Jhansi
221	Jhansi	Mehroni	Scheduled Caste	Lalitpur
222	Kairana	Gangoh		Saharanpur
223	Kairana	Kairana		Shamli
224	Kairana	Nakur		Saharanpur
225	Kairana	Shamli		Shamli
226	Kairana	Thana Bhawan		Shamli
227	Kaiserganj	Colonelganj		Gonda
228	Kaiserganj	Kaiserganj		Bahraich
229	Kaiserganj	Katra Bazar		Gonda
230	Kaiserganj	Payagpur		Bahraich
231	Kaiserganj	Tarabganj		Gonda
232	Kannauj	Bidhuna		Auraiya
233	Kannauj	Chhibramau		Kannauj
234	Kannauj	Kannauj	Scheduled Caste	Kannauj
235	Kannauj	Rasulabad	Scheduled Caste	Kanpur Dehat
236	Kannauj	Tirwa		Kannauj
237	Kanpur	Arya Nagar		Kanpur Nagar
238	Kanpur	Govindnagar		Kanpur Nagar
239	Kanpur	Kanpur Cantt.		Kanpur Nagar
240	Kanpur	Kidwai Nagar		Kanpur Nagar
241	Kanpur	Sishamau		Kanpur Nagar
242	Kaushambi	Babaganj	Scheduled Caste	Pratapgarh
243	Kaushambi	Chail		Kaushambi
244	Kaushambi	Kunda		Pratapgarh
245	Kaushambi	Manjhanpur	Scheduled Caste	Kaushambi
246	Kaushambi	Sirathu		Kaushambi
247	Kheri	Gola Gokrannath		Lakhimpur Kheri
248	Kheri	Lakhimpur		Lakhimpur Kheri
249	Kheri	Nighasan		Lakhimpur Kheri
250	Kheri	Palia		Lakhimpur Kheri
251	Kheri	Sri Nagar	Scheduled Caste	Lakhimpur Kheri
252	Kushinagar	Hata		Kushinagar
253	Kushinagar	Khadda		Kushinagar
254	Kushinagar	Kushinagar		Kushinagar
255	Kushinagar	Padrauna		Kushinagar
256	Kushinagar	Ramkola	Scheduled Caste	Kushinagar
257	Lalganj	Atrauliya		Azamgarh
258	Lalganj	Didarganj		Azamgarh
259	Lalganj	Lalganj	Scheduled Caste	Azamgarh
260	Lalganj	Nizamabad		Azamgarh
261	Lalganj	Phoolpur Pawai		Azamgarh
262	Lucknow	Lucknow Cantt.		Lucknow
263	Lucknow	Lucknow Central		Lucknow
264	Lucknow	Lucknow East		Lucknow
265	Lucknow	Lucknow North		Lucknow
266	Lucknow	Lucknow West		Lucknow
267	Machhlishahr	Kerakat	Scheduled Caste	Jaunpur
268	Machhlishahr	Machhlishahr	Scheduled Caste	Jaunpur
269	Machhlishahr	Mariyahu		Jaunpur
270	Machhlishahr	Pindra		Varanasi
271	Machhlishahr	Zafrabad		Jaunpur
272	Maharajganj	Maharajganj	Scheduled Caste	Maharajganj
273	Maharajganj	Nautanwa		Maharajganj
274	Maharajganj	Paniyara		Mahrajganj
275	Maharajganj	Pharenda		Maharajganj
276	Maharajganj	Siswa		Maharajganj
277	Mainpuri	Bhongaon		Mainpuri
278	Mainpuri	Jaswantnagar		Etawah
279	Mainpuri	Karhal		Mainpuri
280	Mainpuri	Kishni	Scheduled Caste	Mainpuri
281	Mainpuri	Mainpuri		Mainpuri
282	Mathura	Baldev	Scheduled Caste	Mathura
283	Mathura	Chhata		Mathura
284	Mathura	Goverdhan		Mathura
285	Mathura	Mant		Mathura
286	Mathura	Mathura		Mathura
287	Meerut	Hapur	Scheduled Caste	Hapur
288	Meerut	Kithore		Meerut
289	Meerut	Meerut		Meerut
290	Meerut	Meerut Cantt.		Meerut
291	Meerut	Meerut South		Meerut
292	Mirzapur	Chhanbey		Mirzapur
293	Mirzapur	Chunar		Mirzapur
294	Mirzapur	Majhawan		Mirzapur
295	Mirzapur	Madihan		Mirzapur
296	Mirzapur	Mirzapur		Mirzapur
297	Misrikh	Balamau	Scheduled Caste	Hardoi
298	Misrikh	Bilgram-Mallanwan		Hardoi
299	Misrikh	Bilhaur	Scheduled Caste	Kanpur Nagar
300	Misrikh	Misrikh	Scheduled Caste	Sitapur
301	Misrikh	Sandila		Hardoi
302	Mohanlalganj	Bakshi Kaa Talab		Lucknow
303	Mohanlalganj	Malihabad	Scheduled Caste	Lucknow
304	Mohanlalganj	Mohanlalganj	Scheduled Caste	Lucknow
305	Mohanlalganj	Sarojini Nagar		Lucknow
306	Mohanlalganj	Sidhauli	Scheduled Caste	Sitapur
307	Moradabad	Barhapur		Bijnor
308	Moradabad	Kanth		Moradabad
309	Moradabad	Moradabad Nagar		Moradabad
310	Moradabad	Moradabad Rural		Moradabad
311	Moradabad	Thakurdwara		Moradabad
312	Muzaffarnagar	Budhana		Muzaffarnagar
313	Muzaffarnagar	Charthawal		Muzaffarnagar
314	Muzaffarnagar	Khatauli		Muzaffarnagar
315	Muzaffarnagar	Muzaffarnagar		Muzaffarnagar
316	Muzaffarnagar	Sardhana		Meerut
317	Nagina	Dhampur		Bijnor
318	Nagina	Nagina	Scheduled Caste	Bijnor
319	Nagina	Najibabad		Bijnor
320	Nagina	Nehtaur	Scheduled Caste	Bijnor
321	Nagina	Noorpur		Bijnor
322	Phulpur	Allahabad North		Allahabad
323	Phulpur	Allahabad West		Allahabad
324	Phulpur	Phaphamau		Allahabad
325	Phulpur	Phulpur		Allahabad
326	Phulpur	Soraon	Scheduled Caste	Allahabad
327	Pilibhit	Baheri		Bareilly
328	Pilibhit	Barkhera		Pilibhit
329	Pilibhit	Bisalpur		Pilibhit
330	Pilibhit	Pilibhit		Pilibhit
331	Pilibhit	Puranpur	Scheduled Caste	Pilibhit
332	Pratapgarh	Patti		Pratapgarh
333	Pratapgarh	Pratapgarh		Pratapgarh
334	Pratapgarh	Rampur Khas		Pratapgarh
335	Pratapgarh	Raniganj		Pratapgarh
336	Pratapgarh	Vishwanathganj		Pratapgarh
337	Rae Bareli	Bachhrawan	Scheduled Caste	Raebareli
338	Rae Bareli	Harchandpur		Raebareli
339	Rae Bareli	Rae Bareli		Raebareli
340	Rae Bareli	Sareni		Raebareli
341	Rae Bareli	Unchahar		Raebareli
342	Rampur	Bilaspur		Rampur
343	Rampur	Chamraua		Rampur
344	Rampur	Milak	Scheduled Caste	Rampur
345	Rampur	Rampur		Rampur
346	Rampur	Suar		Rampur
347	Robertsganj	Chakia	Scheduled Caste	Chandauli
348	Robertsganj	Duddhi	Scheduled Caste	Sonbhadra
349	Robertsganj	Ghorawal		Sonbhadra
350	Robertsganj	Obra		Sonbhadra
351	Robertsganj	Robertsganj		Sonbhadra
352	Saharanpur	Behat		Saharanpur
353	Saharanpur	Deoband		Saharanpur
354	Saharanpur	Rampur Maniharan	Scheduled Caste	Saharanpur
355	Saharanpur	Saharanpur	Scheduled Caste	Saharanpur
356	Saharanpur	Saharanpur Nagar		Saharanpur
357	Salempur	Bansdih		Ballia
358	Salempur	Belthara Road	Scheduled Caste	Ballia
359	Salempur	Bhatpar Rani		Deoria
360	Salempur	Salempur	Scheduled Caste	Deoria
361	Salempur	Sikanderpur		Ballia
362	Sambhal	Asmoli		Sambhal
363	Sambhal	Bilari		Moradabad
364	Sambhal	Chandausi	Scheduled Caste	Sambhal
365	Sambhal	Kundarki		Moradabad
366	Sambhal	Sambhal		Sambhal
367	Sant Kabir Nagar	Alapur	Scheduled Caste	Ambedkar Nagar
368	Sant Kabir Nagar	Dhanghata	Scheduled Caste	Sant Kabir Nagar
369	Sant Kabir Nagar	Khajani	Scheduled Caste	Gorakhpur
370	Sant Kabir Nagar	Khalilabad		Sant Kabir Nagar
371	Sant Kabir Nagar	Menhdawal		Sant Kabir Nagar
372	Shahjahanpur	Dadraul		Shahjahanpur
373	Shahjahanpur	Jalalabad		Shahjahanpur
374	Shahjahanpur	Katra		Shahjahanpur
375	Shahjahanpur	Powayan	Scheduled Caste	Shahjahanpur
376	Shahjahanpur	Shahjahanpur		Shahjahanpur
377	Shahjahanpur	Tilhar		Shahjahanpur
378	Shrawasti	Balrampur	Scheduled Caste	Balrampur
379	Shrawasti	Bhinga		Shrawasti
380	Shrawasti	Gainsari		Balrampur
381	Shrawasti	Shrawasti		Shrawasti
382	Shrawasti	Tulsipur		Balrampur
383	Sitapur	Biswan		Sitapur
384	Sitapur	Laharpur		Sitapur
385	Sitapur	Mahmoodabad		Sitapur
386	Sitapur	Sevata		Sitapur
387	Sitapur	Sitapur		Sitapur
388	Sultanpur	Isauli		Sultanpur
389	Sultanpur	Kadipur	Scheduled Caste	Sultanpur
390	Sultanpur	Lambhua		Sultanpur
391	Sultanpur	Sadar		Sultanpur
392	Sultanpur	Sultanpur		Sultanpur
393	Unnao	Bangarmau		Unnao
394	Unnao	Bhagwantnagar		Unnao
395	Unnao	Mohan	Scheduled Caste	Unnao
396	Unnao	Purwa		Unnao
397	Unnao	Safipur	Scheduled Caste	Unnao
398	Unnao	Unnao		Unnao
399	Varanasi	Rohaniya		Varanasi
400	Varanasi	Sevapuri		Varanasi
401	Varanasi	Varanasi Cantt.		Varanasi
402	Varanasi	Varanasi North		Varanasi
403	Varanasi	Varanasi South		Varanasi

=== List of legislative assembly elections ===
Election Year	1st Party	2nd Party	3rd Party	4th Party	5th Party	Others	Total Seats	Chief Minister	CM's Party
1951	INC 388	SPI 20	BJS 2	ABHM 1	ABRRP 1	KMPP 1, UPPP 1, UPRSP 1, IND 15	430	Govind Ballabh Pant	INC
1951	INC 388	SPI 20	BJS 2	ABHM 1	ABRRP 1	KMPP 1, UPPP 1, UPRSP 1, IND 15	430	Sampurnanand	INC
1957	INC 286	PSP 44	BJS 17	CPI 9		IND 74	430	Sampurnanand	INC
1957	INC 286	PSP 44	BJS 17	CPI 9		IND 74	430	Chandra Bhanu Gupta	INC
1962	INC 249	BJS 49	PSP 38	SPI 24	SWA 15	CPI 14, RPI 8, HMS 2, IND 31	430	Chandra Bhanu Gupta	INC
1962	INC 249	BJS 49	PSP 38	SPI 24	SWA 15	CPI 14, RPI 8, HMS 2, IND 31	430	Sucheta Kripalani	INC
1967	INC 199	BJS 98	PSP 44	CPI 13	SWA 12	PSP 11, RPI 10, CPI(M) 1, IND 37	425	Chandra Bhanu Gupta	INC
1967	INC 199	BJS 98	PSP 44	CPI 13	SWA 12	PSP 11, RPI 10, CPI(M) 1, IND 37	425	Charan Singh	BKD
1969	INC 211	BKD 98	BJS 49	SSP 33	SWA 5	CPI 4, PSP 3, RPI 1, CPI(M) 1, UPKMP 1, HM 1, IND 18	425	Chandra Bhanu Gupta	INC
1969	INC 211	BKD 98	BJS 49	SSP 33	SWA 5	CPI 4, PSP 3, RPI 1, CPI(M) 1, UPKMP 1, HM 1, IND 18	425	Charan Singh	BKD
1969	INC 211	BKD 98	BJS 49	SSP 33	SWA 5	CPI 4, PSP 3, RPI 1, CPI(M) 1, UPKMP 1, HM 1, IND 18	425	Tribhuvan Narain Singh	INC(O)
1969	INC 211	BKD 98	BJS 49	SSP 33	SWA 5	CPI 4, PSP 3, RPI 1, CPI(M) 1, UPKMP 1, HM 1, IND 18	425	Kamalapati Tripathi	INC
1969	INC 211	BKD 98	BJS 49	SSP 33	SWA 5	CPI 4, PSP 3, RPI 1, CPI(M) 1, UPKMP 1, HM 1, IND 18	425	Hemwati Nandan Bahuguna	INC
1974	INC 215	BKD 106	BJS 61	CPI 16	INC(O) 10	SPI 5, CPI(M) 2, IUML 1, SWP 1, SSD 1, HM 1, IND 5	424	Hemwati Nandan Bahuguna	INC
1974	INC 215	BKD 106	BJS 61	CPI 16	INC(O) 10	SPI 5, CPI(M) 2, IUML 1, SWP 1, SSD 1, HM 1, IND 5	424	Narayan Dutt Tiwari	INC
1977	JP 352	INC 47	CPI 9	CPI(M) 1		IND 16	425	Ram Naresh Yadav	JP
1977	JP 352	INC 47	CPI 9	CPI(M) 1		IND 16	425	Banarasi Das	JP
1980	INC 309	JNP(SC) 59	INC(U) 13	BJP 11	CPI 6	JP 4, JNP(SR) 4, SSD 1, IND 16	425	Vishwanath Pratap Singh	INC
1980	INC 309	JNP(SC) 59	INC(U) 13	BJP 11	CPI 6	JP 4, JNP(SR) 4, SSD 1, IND 16	425	Sripati Mishra	INC
1980	INC 309	JNP(SC) 59	INC(U) 13	BJP 11	CPI 6	JP 4, JNP(SR) 4, SSD 1, IND 16	425	Narayan Dutt Tiwari	INC
1985	INC 269	LD 84	JP 20	BJP 16	CPI 6	INC(J) 5, CPI(M) 2, IND 16	425	Narayan Dutt Tiwari	INC
1985	INC 269	LD 84	JP 20	BJP 16	CPI 6	INC(J) 5, CPI(M) 2, IND 16	425	Vir Bahadur Singh	INC
1989	JD 208	INC 94	BJP 57	BJP 13	CPI 13	LB 2, CPI(M) 2, JP 1, SSD 1, ABHM 1, IND 40	425	Mulayam Singh Yadav	JD
1991	BJP 221	JD 92	INC 46	JP 34	BSP 12	CPI 4, CPI(M) 1, SS 1, SSD 1, IND 7	425	Kalyan Singh	BJP
1993	BJP 177	SP 109	BSP 67	INC 28	JD 27	CPI 3, CPI(M) 1, JP 1, UKD 1, IND 8	425	Mulayam Singh Yadav	SP
1993	BJP 177	SP 109	BSP 67	INC 28	JD 27	CPI 3, CPI(M) 1, JP 1, UKD 1, IND 8	425	Mayawati	BSP
1996	BJP 174	SP 110	BSP 67	INC 33	BKKP 8	JD 7, CPI(M) 4, AIIC(T) 4, SMP 2, CPI 1, SJP(R) 1, IND 13	425	Mayawati	BSP
1996	BJP 174	SP 110	BSP 67	INC 33	BKKP 8	JD 7, CPI(M) 4, AIIC(T) 4, SMP 2, CPI 1, SJP(R) 1, IND 13	425	Kalyan Singh	BJP
1996	BJP 174	SP 110	BSP 67	INC 33	BKKP 8	JD 7, CPI(M) 4, AIIC(T) 4, SMP 2, CPI 1, SJP(R) 1, IND 13	425	Ram Prakash Gupta	BJP
1996	BJP 174	SP 110	BSP 67	INC 33	BKKP 8	JD 7, CPI(M) 4, AIIC(T) 4, SMP 2, CPI 1, SJP(R) 1, IND 13	425	Rajnath Singh	BJP
2002	SP 143	BSP 98	BJP 88	INC 25	RLD 14	Ind 16, AD 3, CPI(M) 2, JD(U) 2	403	Mayawati	BSP
2002	SP 143	BSP 98	BJP 88	INC 25	RLD 14	Ind 16, AD 3, CPI(M) 2, JD(U) 2	403	Mulayam Singh Yadav	SP
2007	BSP 206	SP 97	BJP 51	INC 22	RLD 10	Ind 9, JD(U) 1	403	Mayawati	BSP
2012	SP 224	BSP 80	BJP 47	INC 28	RLD 9	Ind 6, NCP 1, AD 1	403	Akhilesh Yadav	SP
2017	BJP 312	SP 47	BSP 19	AD(S) 9	INC 7	SBSP 4, Ind 3, RLD 1, NISHAD 1	403	Yogi Adityanath	BJP
2022	BJP 255	SP 111	AD(S) 12	RLD 8	SBSP 6	NISHAD 6, INC 2, JDL 2, BSP 1	403	Yogi Adityanath	BJP

== See also ==
- List Uttar Pradesh Legislative Assembly elections
