= 1977 Indian general election in Uttar Pradesh =

The 1977 Indian general election was held following the end of the Emergency (1975–1977) imposed by Prime Minister Indira Gandhi. At the time, Uttar Pradesh had 85 Lok Sabha constituencies, the highest number of any Indian state.

The Janata Party (JP), formed in 1977 as an alliance of parties opposed to the Emergency—including the Indian National Congress (Organisation), Bharatiya Jana Sangh, Bharatiya Lok Dal, and the Socialist Party, along with later defectors from the Indian National Congress—won all 85 seats in Uttar Pradesh, completely defeating the Congress in the state.

One of the most significant outcomes of the election was the defeat of incumbent Prime Minister Indira Gandhi in the Rae Bareli constituency, where she lost to Raj Narain of the Janata Party.

Her son, Sanjay Gandhi, was also defeated in the Amethi constituency by Ravindra Pratap Singh of the Janata Party.

Although the Janata Party was formally established only after the 1977 general election, its candidates contested the election under the banner of the Bharatiya Lok Dal (BLD).

Accordingly, the terms Janata Party (JP) and Bharatiya Lok Dal (BLD) are used interchangeably in this article unless otherwise stated.

== List of Political Parties ==
=== National Parties ===
Party	Flag	Symbol	Leader	Contesting seats
Janata Party			Morarji Desai	85
Indian National Congress			Indira Gandhi	85
Communist Party of India				13
Communist Party of India (Marxist)				2

=== State Parties ===
Party	Flag	Symbol	Leader	Contesting seats
Muslim League				1

=== Registered (Unrecognised) Parties ===
Party	Flag	Symbol	Leader	Contesting seats
Akhil Bharat Hindu Mahasabha				2
Republican Party of India (Khobragade)				2
Akhil Bharati Ramrajya Parishad				2
Shoshit Samaj Dal (Akhil Baharatiya)				2
Socialist Unity Centre of India				1

=== Independents ===
Party	Flag	Symbol	Leader	Contesting seats
Independent				248

== Election Poll Details ==
Electors Data Summary – Uttar Pradesh (1977 Lok Sabha Election)
Statistic	GEN	SC	ST	Total
Number of constituencies	67	18	0	85
Electors (Men)	22,090,803	5,990,134	0	28,080,937
Electors (Women)	18,724,793	5,128,567	0	23,853,360
Total electors	40,815,596	11,118,701	0	51,934,297
Electors who voted (Men)	14,006,622	3,609,911	0	17,616,533
Electors who voted (Women)	9,273,770	2,420,699	0	11,694,469
Total electors who voted	23,280,392	6,030,610	0	29,311,002
Poll percentage	57.04%	54.24%	0.00%	56.44%
Valid votes	22,790,049	5,902,998	0	28,693,047
Rejected votes	490,343	127,612	0	617,955
Rejected vote percentage	2.11%	2.12%	0.00%	2.11%
Missing votes	0	0	0	0
Number of polling stations	47,190	12,709	0	59,899
Average electors per polling station	865	875	0	867

== Voter Turnout ==
#	Constituency	Electors	Voters	Valid votes	Poll %
1	Tehri Garhwal	5,38,207	2,48,586	2,41,732	46.19%
2	Garhwal	5,63,082	2,67,720	2,61,805	47.55%
3	Almora	5,71,452	2,50,422	2,41,192	43.82%
4	Nainital	5,40,445	3,26,678	3,18,170	60.45%
5	Bijnor (SC)	5,94,498	3,53,959	3,47,833	59.54%
6	Amroha	5,75,748	3,59,728	3,53,108	62.48%
7	Moradabad	5,51,951	3,09,125	3,03,595	56.01%
8	Rampur	6,33,744	4,24,796	4,15,682	67.03%
9	Sambhal	5,78,983	3,39,538	3,33,665	58.64%
10	Budaun	6,02,666	3,47,350	3,40,263	57.64%
11	Aonla	5,80,011	3,00,461	2,94,734	51.80%
12	Bareilly	5,63,569	2,99,752	2,94,183	53.19%
13	Pilibhit	5,93,586	3,42,429	3,34,675	57.69%
14	Shahjahanpur	6,39,675	3,62,713	3,55,931	56.70%
15	Kheri	6,12,725	2,94,415	2,85,610	48.05%
16	Shahabad	6,07,261	3,38,112	3,29,960	55.68%
17	Sitapur	5,90,648	3,16,664	3,09,913	53.61%
18	Misrikh (SC)	6,08,431	2,93,393	2,87,301	48.22%
19	Hardoi (SC)	5,95,289	3,10,249	3,03,585	52.12%
20	Lucknow	6,20,406	3,36,306	3,32,049	54.21%
21	Mohanlalganj (SC)	6,00,008	2,73,880	2,67,424	45.65%
22	Unnao	6,19,501	3,30,158	3,23,352	53.29%
23	Rae Bareli	6,32,817	3,42,742	3,32,122	54.16%
24	Pratapgarh	6,30,123	2,94,363	2,86,270	46.72%
25	Amethi	6,23,256	3,02,826	2,91,732	48.59%
26	Sultanpur	6,37,986	3,17,828	3,09,439	49.82%
27	Akbarpur (SC)	6,26,897	3,67,714	3,60,231	58.66%
28	Faizabad	6,14,376	3,16,102	3,07,968	51.45%
29	Bara Banki (SC)	6,02,833	3,05,749	2,98,295	50.72%
30	Kaiserganj	6,41,526	3,07,332	3,00,905	47.91%
31	Bahraich	6,53,318	3,13,363	3,04,670	47.96%
32	Balrampur	6,36,645	3,48,147	3,38,064	54.68%
33	Gonda	6,01,635	2,72,227	2,64,309	45.25%
34	Basti (SC)	6,39,639	3,21,757	3,11,449	50.30%
35	Domariaganj	6,57,832	4,01,100	3,88,730	60.97%
36	Khalilabad	6,41,772	3,87,762	3,78,455	60.42%
37	Bansgaon (SC)	6,31,621	3,08,310	2,99,196	48.81%
38	Gorakhpur	5,70,532	3,27,828	3,23,284	57.46%
39	Maharajganj	5,67,992	3,03,976	2,97,519	53.52%
40	Padrauna	6,20,038	3,22,441	3,12,222	52.00%
41	Deoria	6,62,864	3,44,697	3,35,555	52.00%
42	Salempur	6,74,680	3,58,364	3,51,801	53.12%
43	Ballia	6,61,187	3,69,791	3,62,663	55.93%
44	Ghosi	6,26,672	3,54,670	3,48,085	56.60%
45	Azamgarh	6,32,994	3,62,215	3,55,324	57.22%
46	Lalganj (SC)	6,66,278	3,49,841	3,42,056	52.51%
47	Machhlishahr	6,33,108	3,28,690	3,20,427	51.92%
48	Jaunpur	6,16,192	3,40,943	3,32,490	55.33%
49	Saidpur (SC)	6,56,237	3,67,894	3,60,809	56.06%
50	Ghazipur	6,39,586	3,72,070	3,64,231	58.17%
51	Chandauli	6,04,665	3,98,509	3,91,799	65.91%
52	Varanasi	6,42,595	3,58,755	3,52,173	55.83%
53	Robertsganj (SC)	6,37,043	3,29,826	3,21,535	51.77%
54	Mirzapur	6,27,411	3,21,471	3,13,044	51.24%
55	Phulpur	6,09,188	3,25,408	3,14,562	53.42%
56	Allahabad	6,25,143	3,38,537	3,30,419	54.15%
57	Chail (SC)	6,24,372	2,56,616	2,50,353	41.10%
58	Fatehpur	6,14,485	2,95,191	2,89,916	48.04%
59	Banda	5,62,759	2,95,306	2,86,479	52.47%
60	Hamirpur	5,49,096	3,17,289	3,05,999	57.78%
61	Jhansi	6,33,446	3,51,040	3,39,175	55.42%
62	Jalaun (SC)	6,02,642	3,75,548	3,67,583	62.32%
63	Ghatampur (SC)	6,07,421	3,64,722	3,58,204	60.04%
64	Bilhaur	6,20,424	3,71,190	3,64,539	59.83%
65	Kanpur	6,57,627	3,83,842	3,79,992	58.37%
66	Etawah	5,89,325	3,70,214	3,64,143	62.82%
67	Kannauj	6,18,335	4,18,893	4,11,313	67.75%
68	Farrukhabad	6,37,847	3,73,816	3,69,180	58.61%
69	Mainpuri	6,03,450	3,74,342	3,68,223	62.03%
70	Jalesar	5,76,262	3,70,895	3,65,102	64.36%
71	Etah	5,64,767	3,78,143	3,72,705	66.96%
72	Firozabad (SC)	6,11,215	3,21,138	3,15,502	52.54%
73	Agra	5,66,094	3,72,202	3,66,034	65.75%
74	Mathura	6,24,422	3,92,137	3,86,124	62.80%
75	Hathras (SC)	6,48,461	4,01,699	3,93,889	61.95%
76	Aligarh	6,20,338	4,01,923	3,96,356	64.79%
77	Khurja (SC)	6,11,632	3,64,979	3,59,795	59.67%
78	Bulandshahr	6,29,818	4,08,756	4,02,569	64.90%
79	Hapur	6,31,729	4,32,445	4,25,703	68.45%
80	Meerut	5,95,444	4,04,051	3,99,421	67.86%
81	Baghpat	6,10,712	4,56,968	4,51,064	74.83%
82	Muzaffarnagar	5,73,365	4,05,916	4,00,913	70.80%
83	Kairana	5,70,885	3,81,053	3,75,373	66.75%
84	Saharanpur	5,95,173	3,97,670	3,91,845	66.82%
85	Hardwar (SC)	5,54,184	3,63,336	3,57,958	65.56%
Total		5,19,34,297	2,93,11,002	2,86,93,047	56.44%

== Results ==
Party	Popular vote			Seats		
Party	Votes	%	±pp	Contested	Won	+/−
JP	1,95,30,435	68.07		85	85	
INC	71,70,182	24.99		85	0	
CPI	3,16,387	1.10		13	0	
Others	1,14,191	0.39		12	0	
IND	15,61,852	5.44		248	0	
Total	2,86,93,047	100%	-	443	85	-

== Detailed Results ==
Constituency		Winner				Runner Up				Margin	%
#	Name	Candidate	Party	Votes	%	Candidate	Party	Votes	%	Margin	%
1	Tehri Garhwal	Trepan Singh Negi	JP	1,41,338	58.47	Hira Singh Bisht	INC	70,267	29.07	71,071	29.40
2	Garhwal	Jagannath Sharma	JP	1,80,944	69.11	Chandramohan Singh	INC	76,351	29.16	1,04,593	39.95
3	Almora	Murli Manohar Joshi	JP	1,53,409	63.60	Narendra Singh Bisht	INC	75,933	31.48	77,476	32.12
4	Nainital	Bharat Bhushan	JP	1,96,304	61.70	K. C. Pant	INC	1,11,658	35.09	84,646	26.61
5	Bijnor (SC)	Mahi Lal	JP	2,58,663	74.36	Ram Dayal	INC	62,849	18.07	1,95,814	56.29
6	Amroha	Chandrapal Singh	JP	2,09,895	59.44	Sattar Ahmad	INC	73,401	20.79	1,36,494	38.65
7	Moradabad	Gulam Mohd. Khan	JP	1,96,648	64.77	D.N. Sinha	INC	57,797	19.04	1,38,851	45.73
8	Rampur	Rajendra Kumar Sharma	JP	2,37,708	57.19	Zulfiquar Ali Khan	INC	1,49,630	36.00	88,078	21.19
9	Sambhal	Shanti Devi	JP	2,14,520	64.29	Jugal Kishore	INC	81,656	24.47	1,32,864	39.82
10	Budaun	Onkar Singh	JP	2,31,556	68.05	Mushir Ahmad Khan	INC	88,904	26.13	1,42,652	41.92
11	Aonla	Brij Raj Singh	JP	1,96,703	66.74	Savitri Shyam	INC	59,515	20.19	1,37,188	46.55
12	Bareilly	Ram Murti	JP	1,96,147	66.68	Satish Chandra	INC	88,462	30.07	1,07,685	36.61
13	Pilibhit	Md Shamsul Hasan Khan	JP	2,38,691	71.32	Mohan Swarup	INC	66,015	19.73	1,72,676	51.59
14	Shahjahanpur	Surendra Vikram	JP	2,42,026	68.00	Kunwar Jitendra Prasad	INC	86,602	24.33	1,55,424	43.67
15	Kheri	S.B. Shah	JP	1,73,813	60.86	Bal Govind Verma	INC	99,509	34.84	74,304	26.02
16	Shahabad	Ganga Bhakt Singh	JP	1,99,387	60.43	Dharmgaj Singh	INC	97,839	29.65	1,01,548	30.78
17	Sitapur	Hargovind Verma	JP	1,94,400	62.73	Jagdish Chandra Dixit	INC	84,425	27.24	1,09,975	35.49
18	Misrikh (SC)	Ram Lal Rahi	JP	2,06,727	71.95	Sankta Prasad	INC	80,574	28.05	1,26,153	43.90
19	Hardoi (SC)	Parmai Lal	JP	1,91,873	63.20	Kindar Lal	INC	77,586	25.56	1,14,287	37.64
20	Lucknow	Hemwati Bahuguna	JP	2,42,362	72.99	Sheila Kaul	INC	77,017	23.19	1,65,345	49.80
21	Mohanlalganj (SC)	Ram Lal Kuril	JP	2,03,445	76.08	Ganga Devi	INC	47,703	17.84	1,55,742	58.24
22	Unnao	Raghavendra Singh	JP	2,25,122	69.62	Zairu Rahman Ansari	INC	64,248	19.87	1,60,874	49.75
23	Rae Bareli	Raj Narain	JP	1,77,719	53.51	Indira Gandhi	INC	1,22,517	36.89	55,202	16.62
24	Pratapgarh	Roop Nath Singh Yadav	JP	2,06,339	72.08	Dinesh Singh	INC	57,019	19.92	1,49,320	52.16
25	Amethi	Ravindra Pratap Singh	JP	1,76,410	60.47	Sanjay Gandhi	INC	1,00,566	34.47	75,844	26.00
26	Sultanpur	Zulfikar Ullah	JP	2,32,330	75.08	Kedar Nath Singh	INC	66,796	21.59	1,65,534	53.49
27	Akbarpur (SC)	Mangal Deo Visharad	JP	2,81,082	78.03	Ramji Ram	INC	69,256	19.23	2,11,826	58.80
28	Faizabad	Anant Ram Jaiswal	JP	2,13,719	69.40	Ram Krishna Sinha	INC	65,916	21.40	1,47,803	48.00
29	Bara Banki (SC)	Ram Kinkar	JP	2,06,061	69.08	Baijnath Kureel	INC	58,650	19.66	1,47,411	49.42
30	Kaiserganj	Rudra Sen	JP	1,90,807	63.41	Kunwar Rudra Pratap Singh	INC	66,011	21.94	1,24,796	41.47
31	Bahraich	Om Prakash Tyagi	JP	1,86,946	61.36	Sardar Jogendra Singh	INC	85,527	28.07	1,01,419	33.29
32	Balrampur	Nanaji Deshmukh	JP	2,17,254	64.26	Raj Lakshmi Kumari	INC	1,03,248	30.54	1,14,006	33.72
33	Gonda	Satya Deo Singh	JP	1,57,963	59.76	Anand Singh	INC	86,690	32.80	71,273	26.96
34	Basti (SC)	Sheo Narain	JP	2,16,542	69.53	Anant Prasad Dhusia	INC	76,165	24.46	1,40,377	45.07
35	Domariaganj	Madhav Prasad Tripathi	JP	2,66,876	68.65	Keshav Deo Malviya	INC	1,08,050	27.80	1,58,826	40.85
36	Khalilabad	Brij Bhushan Tiwari	JP	2,71,395	71.71	Krishna Chandra	INC	93,935	24.82	1,77,460	46.89
37	Bansgaon (SC)	Phirangi Prasad	JP	2,25,143	75.25	Sukh Deo Prasad	INC	74,053	24.75	1,51,090	50.50
38	Gorakhpur	Harikesh Bahadur	JP	2,38,635	73.82	Narsingh Narain Pandey	INC	55,581	17.19	1,83,054	56.63
39	Maharajganj	Shibban Lal Saksena	JP	1,84,090	61.88	Raghubar Prasad	INC	52,099	17.51	1,31,991	44.37
40	Padrauna	Ram Dhari Shastri	JP	2,15,660	69.07	Genda Singh	INC	96,562	30.93	1,19,098	38.14
41	Deoria	Ugrasen	JP	2,58,864	77.15	Vishwa Nath	INC	76,691	22.85	1,82,173	54.30
42	Salempur	Ram Naresh Kushwaha	JP	2,53,659	72.10	Tarkeshwar Pandey	INC	72,738	20.68	1,80,921	51.42
43	Ballia	Chandra Shekhar	JP	2,62,641	72.42	Chandrika Prasad	INC	95,423	26.31	1,67,218	46.11
44	Ghosi	Shivram	JP	1,91,190	54.93	Ram Kunwar	INC	77,558	22.28	1,13,632	32.65
45	Azamgarh	Ram Naresh	JP	2,38,985	67.26	Chandrajeet	INC	1,01,175	28.47	1,37,810	38.79
46	Lalganj (SC)	Ramdhan	JP	2,53,068	73.98	Lalsa	INC	88,988	26.02	1,64,080	47.96
47	Machhlishahr	Raj Keshar Singh	JP	2,11,193	65.91	Nageshwar Dwivedi	INC	84,137	26.26	1,27,056	39.65
48	Jaunpur	Yadvendra Dutta Dubey	JP	2,09,923	63.14	Raj Deo Singh	INC	1,10,051	33.10	99,872	30.04
49	Saidpur (SC)	Ram Sagar	JP	2,67,155	74.04	Sankatha Prasad Shastri	INC	77,087	21.37	1,90,068	52.67
50	Ghazipur	Gauri Shanker Rai	JP	1,95,258	53.61	Zainul Bashar	INC	1,00,913	27.71	94,345	25.90
51	Chandauli	Narsingh	JP	2,89,376	73.86	Chanda	INC	84,960	21.68	2,04,416	52.18
52	Varanasi	Chandra Shekher	JP	2,33,194	66.22	Raja Ram	INC	61,340	17.42	1,71,854	48.80
53	Robertsganj (SC)	Sheo Sampat	JP	2,35,164	73.14	Ram Swaroop	INC	72,120	22.43	1,63,044	50.71
54	Mirzapur	Faqir Ali	JP	1,92,000	61.33	Aziz Imam	INC	91,040	29.08	1,00,960	32.25
55	Phulpur	Kamala Bahuguna	JP	2,05,038	65.18	Ram Pujan Patel	INC	82,686	26.29	1,22,352	38.89
56	Allahabad	Janeshwar Mishra	JP	1,90,697	57.71	Vishwanath Pratap Singh	INC	1,00,709	30.48	89,988	27.23
57	Chail (SC)	Ram Nihor Rakesh	JP	1,74,012	69.51	Jagdish Prasad	INC	57,291	22.88	1,16,721	46.63
58	Fatehpur	Bashir Ahmad	JP	2,27,808	78.58	Sant Bux Singh	INC	57,319	19.77	1,70,489	58.81
59	Banda	Ambika Prasad	JP	1,38,848	48.47	Rameshwar Prasad	INC	81,353	28.40	57,495	20.07
60	Hamirpur	Tej Pratap Singh	JP	1,65,488	54.08	Swami Brahma Nandji	INC	84,213	27.52	81,275	26.56
61	Jhansi	Sushila Naiyar	JP	2,22,118	65.49	Govind Das Richharia	INC	91,633	27.02	1,30,485	38.47
62	Jalaun (SC)	Ramcharan	JP	2,76,429	75.20	Chowdhary Ram Sewak	INC	91,154	24.80	1,85,275	50.40
63	Ghatampur (SC)	Jwala Prasad Kureel	JP	2,71,854	75.89	Radhey Shyam	INC	86,350	24.11	1,85,504	51.78
64	Bilhaur	Ram Gopal Singh	JP	2,56,306	70.31	Sushila Rohtagi	INC	88,131	24.18	1,68,175	46.13
65	Kanpur	Manohar Lal	JP	2,69,629	70.96	Naresh Chandra Chaturvedi	INC	95,340	25.09	1,74,289	45.87
66	Etawah	Arjun Singh Bhadoria	JP	2,76,214	75.85	Shri Shankar Tewari	INC	66,049	18.14	2,10,165	57.71
67	Kannauj	Ram Prakash Tripathi	JP	2,87,612	69.93	Balram Singh Yadav	INC	1,16,570	28.34	1,71,042	41.59
68	Farrukhabad	Daya Ram Shakya	JP	2,63,287	71.32	Awdhesh Chandra Singh	INC	76,862	20.82	1,86,425	50.50
69	Mainpuri	Raghunath Singh Verma	JP	2,89,426	78.60	Maharaj Singh	INC	64,304	17.46	2,25,122	61.14
70	Jalesar	Multan Singh Chaudhary	JP	2,69,054	73.69	Rohan Lal	INC	62,508	17.12	2,06,546	56.57
71	Etah	Mahadeepak Singh	JP	2,68,136	71.94	Mustafa Rashid Shervani	INC	86,616	23.24	1,81,520	48.70
72	Firozabad (SC)	Ramji Lal Suman	JP	2,32,679	73.75	Raja Ram Pipal	INC	75,915	24.06	1,56,764	49.69
73	Agra	Shambhu Nath Chaturvedi	JP	2,57,472	70.34	Achal Singh	INC	96,920	26.48	1,60,552	43.86
74	Mathura	Maniram	JP	2,96,518	76.79	Ramhet Singh	INC	81,253	21.04	2,15,265	55.75
75	Hathras (SC)	Ram Prasad Deshmukh	JP	3,00,907	76.39	Chandra Pal Shailani	INC	92,982	23.61	2,07,925	52.78
76	Aligarh	Nawab Singh Chauhan	JP	2,80,811	70.85	Ghan Shyam Singh	INC	90,053	22.72	1,90,758	48.13
77	Khurja (SC)	Mohan Lal	JP	2,89,737	80.53	Hari Singh	INC	63,920	17.77	2,25,817	62.76
78	Bulandshahr	Mahmood Hassan Khan	JP	2,92,611	72.69	Kr. Surendra Pal Singh	INC	81,598	20.27	2,11,013	52.42
79	Hapur	Kunwar Mahood Ali Khan	JP	2,68,074	62.97	B.P. Maurya	INC	1,32,677	31.17	1,35,397	31.80
80	Meerut	Kailash Prakash	JP	2,53,035	63.35	Shahnawaz Khan	INC	1,28,303	32.12	1,24,732	31.23
81	Baghpat	Chaudhari Charan Singh	JP	2,86,301	63.47	Ram Chandra Vikal	INC	1,64,763	36.53	1,21,538	26.94
82	Muzaffarnagar	Saeed Murtaza	JP	2,70,644	67.51	Varun Singh	INC	87,985	21.95	1,82,659	45.56
83	Kairana	Chandan Singh	JP	2,42,500	64.60	Shafquat Jang	INC	95,642	25.48	1,46,858	39.12
84	Saharanpur	Rasheed Masood	JP	2,63,777	67.32	Zahid Hasan	INC	1,00,392	25.62	1,63,385	41.70
85	Hardwar (SC)	Bhagwan Dass	JP	2,55,091	71.26	Sunder Lal	INC	77,888	21.76	1,77,203	49.50

== Aftermath ==
The 1980 Janata Party split marked the disintegration of the anti-Emergency coalition that had formed India's first non-Congress government at the Centre. The split resulted from ideological differences, leadership rivalries, and a dispute over the issue of dual membership, concerning members who were also associated with the Rashtriya Swayamsevak Sangh (RSS). The fragmentation of the party paved the way for the return of Indira Gandhi and the Indian National Congress (I) to power in the 1980 Indian general election.

=== Background ===
The Janata Party government, formed after the 1977 Indian general election, was a coalition of several parties with differing political ideologies. It was weakened by internal power struggles involving Prime Minister Morarji Desai, Charan Singh, and Jagjivan Ram, as well as disagreements over policy and leadership.

=== 1979 split and fall of the government ===
In July 1979, internal divisions reached a climax when leaders including Charan Singh and Raj Narain accused former members of the Bharatiya Jana Sangh of maintaining links with the Rashtriya Swayamsevak Sangh, despite their membership in the Janata Party. Singh and his supporters subsequently broke away to form the Janata Party (Secular).

Following the split, the Morarji Desai government lost its parliamentary majority. Desai resigned as Prime Minister in July 1979 before facing a vote of no confidence. Charan Singh was subsequently sworn in as Prime Minister with outside support from the Indian National Congress (I), but Congress withdrew its support before he could prove his majority in the Lok Sabha, leading to the dissolution of Parliament and the calling of fresh general elections.

=== 1980 split and formation of the Bharatiya Janata Party ===
Following the Janata Party's defeat in the 1980 Indian general election, the party's internal conflicts intensified. In April 1980, the party's national executive resolved that members could not simultaneously belong to the Rashtriya Swayamsevak Sangh, bringing the long-standing dual membership controversy to a head.

Former members of the Bharatiya Jana Sangh rejected the resolution and left the Janata Party. On 6 April 1980, they founded the Bharatiya Janata Party (BJP), under the leadership of Atal Bihari Vajpayee, with Lal Krishna Advani and other former Jana Sangh leaders playing prominent roles.

The remaining socialist and secular factions continued to function as the Janata Party, although the party never regained the political prominence it had achieved following the 1977 general election.

== See Also ==
- 1977 Indian general election
- 1977 Indian general election in West Bengal
- Janata Party (Secular)
