= Dharam =

Dharam can be both a masculine given name and a middle name. Notable people with the name include:

== Given name ==
- Dharam Ablashi (1931–2023), Pakistani-American biomedical researcher
- Dharam Vir Ahluwalia (born 1952), Indian-American theoretical physicist
- Dharam Chand Chaudhary, Indian judge
- Dharam Singh Chhoker, Indian politician
- Dharam Pal Choudhary (1953/1954 – 2018), Indian politician
- Dharam Dass, Indian parliamentarian
- Dharam Singh Deol
- Dharam Gokhool, President of Mauritius
- Dharam Pal Gonder, Indian politician
- Dharam Pal Singh Malik, Indian parliamentarian and lawyer
- Dharam Prakash, Indian parliamentarian
- Dharam Pal Sabharwal, Indian parliamentarian
- Dharam Dass Shastri, Indian politician
- Dharam Singh Hayatpur (1884–1926), member of Sikh political and religious group the Babbar Akali Movement
- Dharam Singh, Indian politician
- Dharam Singh (field hockey, born 1919) (1919–2001), Indian field hockey right back
- Dharam Singh (field hockey, born 1937), Indian field hockey player
- Dharam Singh (Sikhism) (1666–1708), historical figure in Sikhism
- Dharam Gaj Singh, Indian parliamentarian
- Dharam Singh Nihang Singh (born 1936), founder of Sachkhoj Academy
- Dharam Bir Sinha, Indian parliamentarian
- Dharam Dev Solanki, Indian politician
- Dharam Singh Uppal (1959–2013), Indian former international athlete
- Dharam Vir Vasisht, Indian parliamentarian
- Dharam Pal Yadav, Indian politician

== Middle name ==
- Baba Dharam Dass, Punjabi Jain holy man
- Sai Dharam Tej, Indian actor
