= Bithoor Assembly constituency =

Constituency of the Uttar Pradesh legislative assembly in India

Bithoor
- Constituency No. 210 for the Uttar Pradesh Legislative Assembly

Constituency details
- Country: India
- Region: North India
- State: Uttar Pradesh
- District: Kanpur Nagar
- Lok Sabha constituency: Akbarpur
- Total electors: 3,67,146 (2019)
- Reservation: None

Member of Legislative Assembly
- 18th Uttar Pradesh Legislative Assembly
- Incumbent Abhijeet Singh Sanga
- Party: Bharatiya Janta Party
- Elected year: 2022

Bithoor Assembly constituency is one of 403 legislative assembly seats of Uttar Pradesh. It is part of the Akbarpur Lok Sabha constituency.

== Overview ==
Bithoor comprises KC 4-Bhitargaon of 3-Ghatampur Tehsil; KCs 1-Pali, 4-Bidhnu, 5- Sachendi, 6-Bithoor and Bithoor Nagar Palika of 2-Kanpur Sadar Tehsil.

== Members of Legislative Assembly ==
Year	Member	Party
Till 2012 : Constituency did not exist
2012	Munindra Shukla	Samajwadi Party
2017	Abhijeet Singh Sanga	Bharatiya Janata Party
2022	Abhijeet Singh Sanga	Bharatiya Janata Party

== Election results ==
=== 2027 ===
2027 Uttar Pradesh Legislative Assembly election: Bithoor
Party	Candidate	Votes	%	±%
INDIA				
NDA				
BSP				
NOTA	None of the above			
Majority				
Turnout				
gain from		Swing		

=== 2022 ===
2022 Uttar Pradesh Legislative Assembly election: Bithoor
Party	Candidate	Votes	%	±%
BJP	Abhijeet Singh Sanga	107,330	44.46	−4.68
SP	Munindra Shukla	86,257	35.73	+12.18
BSP	Ramesh Singh Yadav	36,955	15.31	−7.93
INC	Ashok Kumar Nishad	4,447	1.84	
NOTA	None of the above	1,759	0.73	−0.1
Majority		21,073	8.73	−16.86
Turnout		241,399	65.52	+0.41
BJP hold		Swing		

=== 2017 ===
U. P. Legislative Assembly Election, 2017: Bithoor
Party	Candidate	Votes	%	±%
BJP	Abhijeet Singh Sanga	113,289	49.14	
SP	Munindra Shukla	54,302	23.55	
BSP	Ram Prakash Kushwaha	53,586	23.24	
NOTA	None of the above	1,900	0.83	
Majority		58,987	25.59	
Turnout		230,544	65.11	
BJP gain from SP		Swing		

=== 2012 ===
U. P. Legislative Assembly Election, 2012: Bithoor
Party	Candidate	Votes	%	±%
SP	Munindra Shukla	61,081	29.82	
BSP	Ram Prakash Kushwaha	60,410	29.49	
INC	Abhijeet Singh Sanga	51,822	25.30	
BJP	Dinesh Awasthi	17,955	8.77	
IND.	Upendra Kumar Dwivedi	1,376	0.67	
Majority		671	0.33	
Turnout		2,04,846	62.19	
SP win (new seat)				

== See also ==
- List of Vidhan Sabha constituencies of Uttar Pradesh
