= Anil Shukla Warsi =

Indian politician

Anil Shukla Warsi अनिल शुक्ल वारसी
- Preceded by: Raja Ram Pal
- Constituency: Bilhaur (Kanpur)

Personal details
- Born: 1957 (age 68–69)
- Party: Bharatiya Janata Party
- Spouse: Pratibha Shukla
- As of 17 February, 2012 Source: Parliament of India official biography

Anil Shukla Warsi is an Indian politician. In 2007, he was elected to 14th Lok Sabha in a by poll from Bilhaur (Kanpur) Constituency as BSP candidate. He contested 16th Lok Sabha election from Akbarpur constituency on BSP's ticket in the 2014 Indian general election but lost. In 2015, he resigned from Bahujan Samaj Party and joined Bharatiya Janata Party. He has also been a member of Samajwadi Party.
