= Shyam Bihari Misra =

Indian politician (1938–2021)

Shyam Bihari Mishra श्याम बिहारी मिश्र

Member of the Indian Parliament for Bilhaur
- In office 1991–2004
- Preceded by: Arun Nehru
- Succeeded by: Raja Ram Pal

Personal details
- Born: 8 May 1938 Pipra, Kanpur, Uttar Pradesh
- Died: 20 April 2021 (aged 82) Delhi
- Party: BJP
- Spouse: Jayanti Mishra
- Children: 4 sons and 1 daughter
- Website: www.buvm.org

Pandit Shyam Bihari Baijnath Mishra (8 May 1938 – 20 April 2021) was an Indian politician belonging to the Bharatiya Janata Party.

== Biography ==
He was a member of the Lok Sabha elected from Bilhaur Lok Sabha Constituency in Kanpur district four times. He was the President of Bharatiya Udyog Vyapaar Mandal.

He died from COVID-19 in April 2021.

== Positions held ==
1991 Elected to 10th Lok Sabha

1991–96 Member, Consultative Committee, Ministry of Food

1993–96 Chairman, Committee on Food, Civil Supplies and Public Distribution

1996 Re-elected to 11th Lok Sabha (2nd term)

1996–97 Member, Consultative Committee, Ministry of Food

1997–98 Member, Committee on Food, Civil Supplies and Public Distribution

1998 Re-elected to 12th Lok Sabha (3rd term)

1998–99 Chairman, Joint Committee on the Essential Commodities (Amendment) Bill,1998

Member, Committee on Food, Civil Supplies and Public Distribution; and its Sub-Committee-D on Department of Coordination and also Convenor, Sub-Committee-B on Department of Sugar and Edible Oils

Member, Committee of Privileges Member, Consultative Committee, Ministry of Communications

1999 Re-elected to 13th Lok Sabha (4th term)

1999–2000 Member, Committee on Food, Civil Supplies and Public Distribution, Member, Committee on Estimates

2000–2001 Member, Committee on Estimates

2000 onwards Member, Consultative Committee, Ministry of Communications
