= Akbarpur-Raniya Assembly constituency =

Constituency of the Uttar Pradesh legislative assembly in India

Akbarpur-Raniya
- Constituency No. 206 for the Uttar Pradesh Legislative Assembly

Constituency details
- Country: India
- Region: North India
- State: Uttar Pradesh
- District: Kanpur Dehat
- Lok Sabha constituency: Akbarpur
- Total electors: 3,14,081 (2019)
- Reservation: None

Member of Legislative Assembly
- 18th Uttar Pradesh Legislative Assembly
- Incumbent Pratibha Shukla
- Party: Bharatiya Janta Party
- Elected year: 2017

Akbarpur-Raniya Assembly constituency is one of 403 legislative assembly seats of the Uttar Pradesh. It is part of the Akbarpur Lok Sabha constituency. It is part of Kanpur Dehat district.

== Overview ==
Akbarpur-Raniya comprises KCs 1-Akbarpur, 3-Raniya, 4-Rura, 5-Shiwali, Shiwali TA, Akbarpur TA & Rura TA of 3-Akbarpur Tehsil.

== Members of Legislative Assembly ==
Year	Member	Political Party
2012	Ram Swaroop Singh	Samajwadi Party
2017	Pratibha Shukla	Bharatiya Janata Party
2022	Pratibha Shukla	Bharatiya Janata Party

== Election results ==
=== 2027 ===
2027 Uttar Pradesh Legislative Assembly election: Akbarpur-Raniya
Party	Candidate	Votes	%	±%
INDIA				
NDA				
BSP				
NOTA	None of the above			
Majority				
Turnout				
gain from		Swing		

=== 2022 ===
2022 Uttar Pradesh Legislative Assembly election: Akbarpur-Raniya
Party	Candidate	Votes	%	±%
BJP	Pratibha Shukla	92,827	43.82	+0.79
SP	Ram Prakash Kushwaha	79,410	37.49	+8.6
BSP	Vinod Kumar Pal	32,233	15.22	−7.3
NOTA	None of the above	1,191	0.56	+0.02
Majority		13,417	6.33	−7.81
Turnout		211,830	64.73	−1.22
BJP hold		Swing		

=== 2017 ===
2017 Uttar Pradesh Legislative Assembly election: Akbarpur-Raniya
Party	Candidate	Votes	%	±%
BJP	Pratibha Shukla	87,430	43.03	
SP	Neeraj Singh	58,701	28.89	
BSP	Dr. Satish Shukla	45,761	22.52	
LKD	Vijay Laxmi	2,313	1.14	
NOTA	None of the above	1,098	0.54	
Majority		28,729	14.14	
Turnout		203,207	65.95	
BJP gain from SP		Swing		

=== 2012 ===
2012 Uttar Pradesh state assembly election: Akbarpur-Raniya
Party	Candidate	Votes	%	±%
SP	Ram Swaroop Singh	69,148	37.12	
BSP	Pratibha Shukla	67,905	36.46	
INC	Mathura Prasad Pal	21,887	11.75	
BJP	Ravi Shankar Shukla	19,610	10.53	
Independent	Rameshwar	1,716	0.92	
Majority		1,243	0.66	
Turnout		1,86,260	64.77	
SP win (new seat)				

== See also ==
- List of Vidhan Sabha constituencies of Uttar Pradesh
