= Akbarpur Lok Sabha constituency =

Lok Sabha constituency in Uttar Pradesh, India

Coordinates: 26.43°N 82.54°E

Akbarpur UP-44
- Lok Sabha constituency
- Interactive Map Outlining Akbarpur Lok Sabha constituency

Constituency details
- Country: India
- Region: North India
- State: Uttar Pradesh
- Assembly constituencies: Akbarpur-Raniya; Bithoor; Kalyanpur; Maharajpur; Ghatampur
- Established: 2009-present
- Total electors: 18,69,167 (2024)
- Reservation: None

Member of Parliament
- 18th Lok Sabha
- Incumbent Devendra Singh
- Party: Bharatiya Janata Party
- Elected year: 2024

Akbarpur Lok Sabha constituency is one of the 80 Lok Sabha (parliamentary) constituencies in Uttar Pradesh state in northern India. This constituency came into existence in 2008 as a part of the implementation of delimitation of parliamentary constituencies based on the recommendations of the Delimitation Commission of India constituted in 2002.

== Assembly Segments ==
No	Name	District	Member	Party	2024 Lead
206	Akbarpur-Raniya	Kanpur Dehat	Pratibha Shukla	BJP	SP
210	Bithoor	Kanpur Nagar	Abhijeet Singh Sanga	BJP	SP
211	Kalyanpur	Kanpur Nagar	Neelima Katiyar	BJP	BJP
217	Maharajpur	Kanpur Nagar	Satish Mahana	BJP	BJP
218	Ghatampur (SC)	Kanpur Nagar	Saroj Kureel	AD(S)	SP

These assembly segments were earlier in erstwhile Bilhaur and Ghatampur (SC) parliamentary constituencies.

== Members of Parliament ==
Year	Member	Party
2009	Raja Ram Pal	Indian National Congress
2014	Devendra Singh	Bharatiya Janata Party
2019	Devendra Singh	Bharatiya Janata Party
2024	Devendra Singh	Bharatiya Janata Party

== Election results ==
=== General Election 2024 ===
2024 Indian general elections: Akbarpur
Party	Candidate	Votes	%	±%
BJP	Devendra Singh	517,423	47.60	▼9.09
SP	Raja Ram Pal	4,73,078	43.52	▲43.52
BSP	Rajesh Dwivedi	73,140	6.73	▼23.13
NOTA	None of the above	7,649	0.70	▼0.08
Majority		44,345	4.08	▼22.75
Turnout		10,86,953	57.78	▼0.35
BJP hold		Swing	▼9.09	

=== 2019 ===
2019 Indian general elections: Akbarpur
Party	Candidate	Votes	%	±%
BJP	Devendra Singh	581,282	56.69	+7.12
BSP	Nisha Sachan	3,06,140	29.86	+9.01
INC	Raja Ram Pal	1,08,341	10.57	+0.60
NOTA	None of the Above	7,994	0.78	+0.41
Majority		2,75,142	26.83	−1.89
Turnout		10,26,633	58.13	+3.20
BJP hold		Swing	+7.12	

=== 2014 ===
2014 Indian general elections: Akbarpur
Party	Candidate	Votes	%	±%
BJP	Devendra Singh	481,584	49.57	+28.09
BSP	Anil Shukla Warsi	2,02,587	20.85	−4.34
SP	Lal Singh Tomar	1,47,002	15.13	−2.89
INC	Raja Ram Pal	96,827	9.97	−20.25
AAP	Arvind Kumar	7,914	0.81	New
NOTA	None of the Above	3,948	0.41	New
Majority		2,78,997	28.72	+23.69
Turnout		9,71,448	54.93	+11.31
BJP gain from INC		Swing	+19.35	

=== 2009 ===
2009 Indian general elections: Akbarpur
Party	Candidate	Votes	%	±%
INC	Raja Ram Pal	192,549	30.22	
BSP	Anil Shukla Warsi	1,60,506	25.19	
BJP	Arun Kumar Tiwari (Baba)	1,36,907	21.48	
SP	Kamlesh Kumar Pathak	1,14,820	18.02	
Independent	Ram Nath Verma	7,243	1.14	
Independent	Virendra Vishwakarma	6,613	1.04	
Janwadi Party Socialist	Amar Singh Chauhan	5,468	0.86	
RSMD	Dr. A. K. Gupta	2,627	0.41	
Independent	Manjesh Kumar	1,642	0.26	
Rastriya Kranrikari Party	Satendra Kushwaha	1,580	0.25	
Akhil Bhartiya Ashok Sena	Vimal Singh	1,494	0.23	
BPD	Dharmendra Pratap Singh	1,461	0.23	
Independent	Omkar	1,355	0.21	
Majority		32,043	5.03	−2.83
Turnout		6,37,254	43.62	
INC win (new seat)				

== See also ==
- Kanpur Dehat district
- List of constituencies of the Lok Sabha
- Kanpur Nagar Lok Sabha constituency
- Bilhaur, Kanpur Lok Sabha constituency
- Ghatampur, Kanpur Lok Sabha constituency
- Kanpur (Mayoral Constituency)
- Kanpur (Division Graduates Constituency)
