= Ram Swaroop Singh =

Indian politician (1936–2023)

Ram Swaroop Singh राम स्वरूप सिंह
- Constituency: Akarpur-Raniya

Member of Legislative Assembly, Uttar Pradesh
- In office 2002–2007
- In office 2007–2012
- In office 2012–2017

Minister of State for Panchayati Raj, Government of Uttar Pradesh
- In office 3 October 2003 – 4 July 2004

Personal details
- Born: 19 August 1936 Mahera, Kanpur Dehat (Uttar Pradesh), British India
- Died: 18 February 2023 (aged 86)
- Party: Samajwadi Party
- Children: 1
- Profession: Politician, Businessman

Ram Swaroop Singh (19 August 1936 – 18 February 2023) was an Indian politician who was a member of the Uttar Pradesh Legislative Assembly. He also worked as Minister of State in the Mayawati's cabinet. He was elected first time in 2002 from Sarvankhera assembly constituency of Kanpur Dehat district.

== Life and career ==
Singh started his political life by participating in society's elections. He officiated the post of chairman of Zila Sahkari Bank Ltd. Kanpur, a member of Zila Panchayat Kanpur Dehat district. The first time he fought the assembly election in 1997 as an independent candidate but he did not reach his goal. In 2002 he met Bahujan Samajwadi Party Supremo Mayawati and joined Bahujan Samajwadi Party and succeeded in finding a ticket from BSP. In 2002 he fought the assembly election from Sarwankheda constituency of district Kanpur Dehat as BSP candidate and became winner. He also officiated for some time as state minister in Mayawati government. In political turmoil, he resigned from the Mayawati government, and his party BSP, and joined Samajwadi Party. In 2007 and 2012 he fought elections as member of Legislative Assembly from Akbarpur-Raniya (Vidhan Sabha constituency) of district Kanpur Dehat (Ramabai Nagar) as Samajwadi Party candidate and he won seats. He was sitting MLA from Akbarpur-Raniya (Vidhan Sabha constituency)-206 of district Kanpur Dehat. Singh died on 18 February 2023, at the age of 86.
