= Jagdish Awasthi =

Indian politician

Member of Parliament, Lok Sabha
- In office 1957-1962
- Succeeded by: Braj Behari Mehrotra
- In office 1984-1989
- Preceded by: Ram Narain Tripathi
- Succeeded by: Arun Nehru
- Constituency: Bilhaur, Uttar Pradesh

Personal details
- Born: 13 March 1923 Sithmara Village, Ballia, United Provinces, British India (now in Uttar Pradesh, India)
- Died: 21 September 2008 (aged 85)
- Party: Indian National Congress
- Spouse: Vedvati Awasthi

Jagdish Awasthi (1923-2008) was an Indian politician. He was elected to the Lok Sabha, the lower house of the Parliament of India from the Bilhaur constituency of Uttar Pradesh as a member of the Indian National Congress.
