= Bilhaur Lok Sabha constituency =

Former constituency in Uttar Pradesh, India

Coordinates: 26.8°N 80.1°E

Bilhaur
- Former Lok Sabha constituency

Constituency details
- Country: India
- Region: North India
- State: Uttar Pradesh
- Established: 1957
- Abolished: 2008

Bilhaur (Kanpur) was a Lok Sabha parliamentary constituency in Uttar Pradesh. The last election for this constituency was held in 2004 before it was abolished in delimitation in 2008.

== Assembly segments ==
| No | Name | District | Electorate (2007) |
|---|---|---|---|
| 276 | Kalyanpur | Kanpur Nagar | 3,76,612 |
| 277 | Sarsaul | Kanpur Nagar | 2,73,365 |
| 281 | Sarvankhera | Kanpur Dehat | 2,66,589 |
| 282 | Chaubepur | Kanpur Dehat | 2,48,416 |
| 283 | Bilhaur (SC) | Kanpur Dehat | 2,45,781 |

== Members of Parliament ==
| Year | Member | Party |
|---|---|---|
| 1957 | Jagdish Awasthi | Indian National Congress |
| 1962 | Braj Bihari Mehrotra | Indian National Congress |
| 1967 | Sushila Rohatgi | Indian National Congress |
| 1971 | Sushila Rohatgi | Indian National Congress |
| 1977 | Ram Gopal Singh | Janata Party |
| 1980 | Ram Narain Tripathi | Indian National Congress (I) |
| 1984 | Jagdish Awasthi | Indian National Congress |
| 1989 | Arun Nehru | Janata Dal |
| 1991 | Shyam Bihari Misra | Bharatiya Janata Party |
| 1996 | Shyam Bihari Misra | Bharatiya Janata Party |
| 1998 | Shyam Bihari Misra | Bharatiya Janata Party |
| 1999 | Shyam Bihari Misra | Bharatiya Janata Party |
| 2004 | Raja Ram Pal | Bahujan Samaj Party |
| 2007^ | Anil Shukla Warsi | Bahujan Samaj Party |
2008 onwards : Constituency does not exist

== Election results ==
=== 1989 ===
1989 Indian general election: Bilhaur (Kanpur)
| Party | Candidate | Votes | % | ±% |
|---|---|---|---|---|
| JD | Arun Kumar Nehru | 285,047 | 57.47 | |
| INC | Jagdish Awasthi | 1,38,815 | 27.99 | |
| BSP | Jai Veer | 23,360 | 4.71 | |
| IND. | Jagdish Prasad | 14,286 | 2.88 | |
| LKD(B) | Ram Gopal | 7,242 | 1.46 | |
| Majority | | 1,46,232 | 29.48 | |
| Turnout | | 4,95,953 | 51.21 | |
| JD gain from INC | | Swing | | |

=== 1991 ===
1991 Indian general election: Bilhaur (Kanpur)
| Party | Candidate | Votes | % | ±% |
|---|---|---|---|---|
| BJP | Shyam Bihari Misra | 1,37,421 | 30.23 | |
| JP | Sarwan Kumar Singh | 95,797 | 21.08 | |
| INC | Jayant Kumar Malhotra | 95,072 | 20.92 | |
| JD | Virendra Nath Dixit | 92,173 | 20.28 | |
| LKD | Bharat Singh | 7,919 | 1.74 | |
| Majority | | 41,624 | 9.15 | |
| Turnout | | 4,54,544 | 46.13 | |
| BJP gain from JD | | Swing | | |

=== 1996 ===
1996 Indian general election: Bilhaur (Kanpur)
| Party | Candidate | Votes | % | ±% |
|---|---|---|---|---|
| BJP | Shyam Bihari Misra | 2,15,561 | 38.93 | |
| BSP | Raja Ram Pal | 1,82,022 | 32.88 | |
| SP | Sukhram Singh Yadav | 99,637 | 18.00 | |
| INC | Shivnath Singh Kushwaha | 25,237 | 4.56 | |
| Independent | Sanjay Patel | 3,629 | 0.66 | |
| Majority | | 33,539 | 6.05 | |
| Turnout | | 5,53,661 | 44.74 | |
| BJP hold | | Swing | | |

=== 1998 ===
1998 Indian general election: Bilhaur (Kanpur)
| Party | Candidate | Votes | % | ±% |
|---|---|---|---|---|
| BJP | Shyam Bihari Misra | 2,80,318 | 41.36 | |
| BSP | Raja Ram Pal | 1,81,771 | 26.82 | |
| SP | Hari Kishan | 1,76,106 | 25.99 | |
| INC | Bhudhar Narayan Mishra | 27,020 | 3.99 | |
| AD(K) | Mahesh Pal | 3,272 | 0.48 | |
| Majority | | 98,547 | 14.54 | |
| Turnout | | 6,77,693 | 53.93 | |
| BJP hold | | Swing | | |

=== 1999 ===
1999 Indian general election: Bilhaur (Kanpur)
| Party | Candidate | Votes | % | ±% |
|---|---|---|---|---|
| BJP | Shyam Bihari Misra | 1,92,054 | 30.37 | |
| BSP | Raja Ram Pal | 1,88,831 | 29.86 | |
| SP | Sadhuram Kushwaha | 1,24,415 | 19.67 | |
| INC | Naresh Bahadur | 1,12,070 | 17.72 | |
| AD(K) | Sohan Prakash | 12,950 | 2.05 | |
| Majority | | 3,223 | 0.51 | |
| Turnout | | 6,32,450 | 50.15 | |
| BJP hold | | Swing | | |

=== 2004 ===
2004 Indian general election: Bilhaur (Kanpur)
| Party | Candidate | Votes | % | ±% |
|---|---|---|---|---|
| BSP | Raja Ram Pal | 2,23,195 | 34.80 | |
| SP | Lal Singh Tomar | 1,98,793 | 30.99 | |
| BJP | Shyam Bihari Misra | 1,59,681 | 24.90 | |
| INC | Madan Mohan Shukla | 34,049 | 5.31 | |
| Independent | Surya Bali | 7,054 | 1.10 | |
| Majority | | 24,402 | 3.81 | |
| Turnout | | 6,41,397 | 46.83 | |
| BSP hold | | Swing | | |

=== 2007 by-election ===
By Election, 2007: Bilhaur (Kanpur)
| Party | Candidate | Votes | % | ±% |
|---|---|---|---|---|
| BSP | Anil Shukla Warsi | 229,123 | 34.22 | |
| SP | Lal Singh Tomar | 2,03,111 | 30.33 | |
| BJP | Shyam Bihari Misra | 1,14,620 | 17.12 | |
| BSKP | Raja Ram Pal | 49,976 | 7.46 | |
| INC | Naresh Bahadur Singh | 40,974 | 6.12 | |
| Majority | | 26,012 | 3.89 | |
| Turnout | | 6,69,612 | 47.46 | |
| BSP hold | | Swing | | |

== See also ==
- Bilhaur
- List of constituencies of the Lok Sabha
