= Bidhnu =

- town
- Location in Uttar Pradesh, India
- Coordinates: 26°20′0″N 80°17′0″E
- Country: India
- State: Uttar Pradesh
- District: Kanpur

Government
  - Body: Kanpur District Administration
- Elevation: 123 m (404 ft)

Population (2011)
  - Total: 8,000

Languages
  - Official: Hindi
- Time zone: UTC+5:30 (IST)
- Postal code: 209214
- Vehicle registration: UP-
- Coastline: 0 kilometres (0 mi)

Bidhnu is a town in Kanpur district in the state of Uttar Pradesh, India. This town is 10 miles from, the historical heritage, bhitargaon temple. Due to differences in languages and dialects over time, the word Vishnu became popular with Bidhanu. Kathara, khersa, bidhnoo, afazalpur and ramaipur are most populated gram panchayat of Bidhanu development block. bidhnu is a Development Block in Kanpur nagar tehsil and comes under Kanpur Metropolitan Area.

== Transport ==
Bidhnu is well connected by road through NH 34.

== Geography ==
Bidhnu is located at 26°20′0″N 80°17′0″E. It has an average elevation of 123 meters (406 feet).
