= Chaubepur Assembly constituency =

Constituency of the Uttar Pradesh legislative assembly in India

Chaubepur constituency

Constituency details
- Country: India
- Region: North India
- State: Uttar Pradesh

Chaubepur Assembly constituency is one of the 403 Vidhan Sabha (legislative assembly) constituencies of the Uttar Pradesh Legislative Assembly, India.

== Members of Legislative Assembly ==
Year	Member	Political Party
1977	Harikrishna Srivastava	Janata Party
1980	Harikrishna Srivastava	Janata Party (Secular)
1984	Nekchand Pandey	Indian National Congress
1989	Hari Kishan	Janata Dal
1991	Somnath Shukla	Bharatiya Janata Party
1993	Hari Kishan	Bharatiya Janata Party
1996	Hari Kishan	Bahujan Samaj Party
2002	Ashok Kumar	Bahujan Samaj Party
2007	Pratibha Shukla	Bahujan Samaj Party

== Election results ==
U. P. Legislative Assembly Election, 2007: Chaubepur
Party	Candidate	Votes	%	±%
BSP	Pratibha Shukla	41,703	34.34	
SP	Amitabh Bajpai	31,435	25.89	
BSKP	Krishna Pal Singh	20,148	16.59	
BJP	Dinesh Awasthi	18,693	15.39	
INC	Avinash Kumar Mishra	4,154	3.42	
IND.	Shyam Narain Bajpai	1,719	1.41	
Majority		10,268	8.45	
Turnout		1,21,432	48.88	
BSP hold		Swing		

U. P. Legislative Assembly Election, 2002: Chaubepur
Party	Candidate	Votes	%	±%
BSP	Ashok Kumar	27,359	22.72	
BJP	Chandra Prabha Shukla	26,657	22.14	
SP	Munindra Shukla	22,283	18.51	
IND.	Ramji Tripathi	15,820	13.14	
RTKP	Krishna Pal Singh	14,756	12.26	
INC	Kailash Pal	7,394	6.14	
Majority		702	0.58	
Turnout		1,20,406	53.10	
BSP hold		Swing		
