= Madhu Gupta =

Indian politician

Dr. Madhu Gupta डा. मधु गुप्ता

Personal details
- Political party: Samajwadi Party
- Spouse: Dr. A. K. Gupta
- Education: MBBS
- Profession: Gynecologist, politician

Madhu Gupta is an Indian doctor and politician from the state of Uttar Pradesh. She was member of Uttar Pradesh Legislative Council.

== Sources ==
- http://www.business-standard.com/article/economy-policy/i-am-true-challenger-to-prime-minister-madhu-gupta-104043001012_1.html
