= Dharam Gaj Singh =

Indian politician

Dharam Gaj Singh (born 7 July 1927) was member of 5th Lok Sabha from Shahabad Lok Sabha constituency in Uttar Pradesh State, India. He was born in Dheoramaholia, Hardoi district, Uttar Pradesh.

He was elected to 7th, 8th and 9th Lok Sabha from the Shahabad constituency.
