= Iliyas Azmi =

Indian politician (1934–2023)

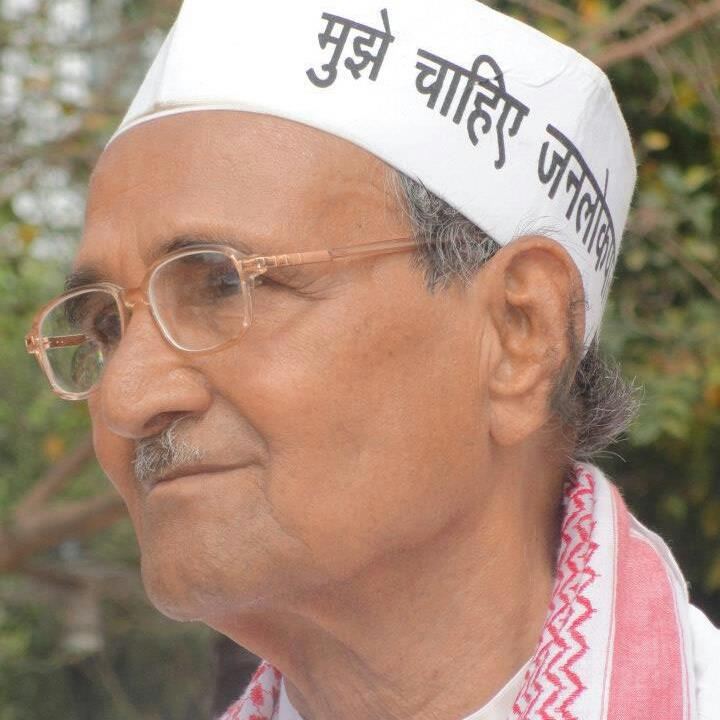

MP
- Constituency: Kheri and Shahabad

Personal details
- Born: 22 August 1934 Azamgarh, United Provinces, British India
- Died: 4 June 2023 (aged 88) lucknow, Uttar pradesh, India
- Party: Aam Aadmi Party
- Spouse: Badarunnisa
- Children: 8
- Website: www.ilyasazmi.com
- As of 17 September, 2006

Iliyas Azmi (22 August 1934 – 4 June 2023) was an Indian politician who was a Member of Parliament from Uttar Pradesh. He represented Shahabad, Uttar Pradesh Lok Sabha constituency in 2004 and Kheri (Lok Sabha constituency) in 2009 for the Bahujan Samaj Party. He later joined the Aam Aadmi Party, and quit the Aam Aadmi Party and PAC in 2016.

== Life ==
Azmi was born on 22 August 1934 at Sadarpur Barauli-Phulpur in Azamgarh district, Uttar Pradesh. His father's name was Mohammed Maruf. He was educated at Roztul Olum, Phulpur as a Hafiz.

Azmi married the late Smt. Badarunnisa on 2 May 1950. He had four sons and four daughters. Azmi died in Apollo Hospitals on 4 June 2023, at the age of 88.

== Positions held ==
- 1980–1986: General Secretary, Muslim Majlis, Uttar Pradesh.
- 1986–1987: Vice-president, Muslim Majlis, Uttar Pradesh.
- 1987–1989: President, Muslim Majlis, Uttar Pradesh.
- President, All India Muslim Majlis.
- 1996: Elected to eleventh Lok Sabha.

== Books Published ==
=== Hindi Books ===
- 'Sampardayikta Kulin Tantra Ki Jarurat.'
- 'Baba Saheb Bhimrao Ambedkar.'
- 'Periyar Rama Swami Naikar.'
- 'Insan aur Devta.'

=== Urdu Books ===
- 'Payame Zindgi.'
- 'Musalamano Ki Siyasat Jakham aur Ilaz.'
- 'Harijano Ki Moraot.'
- 'Iran Ka Islami Inklab Hakikat Ke Aiane Mein.'
- 'Kagia Darululum Ya Bainajakwami Sazish'
