= Chandradeo Prasad Rajbhar =

Indian politician

Ex MP
- Constituency: Ghosi

Personal details
- Born: 2 January 1953 (age 73) Mau, Uttar Pradesh
- Party: SP
- Spouse: Sharada Devi
- Children: 3 sons
- As of 17 September, 2006

Chandradeo Prasad Rajbhar (born 2 January 1953) is an Indian politician for the Ghosi (Lok Sabha constituency) in Uttar Pradesh.
