= Abhijeet Singh Sanga =

Indian politician (born 1983)

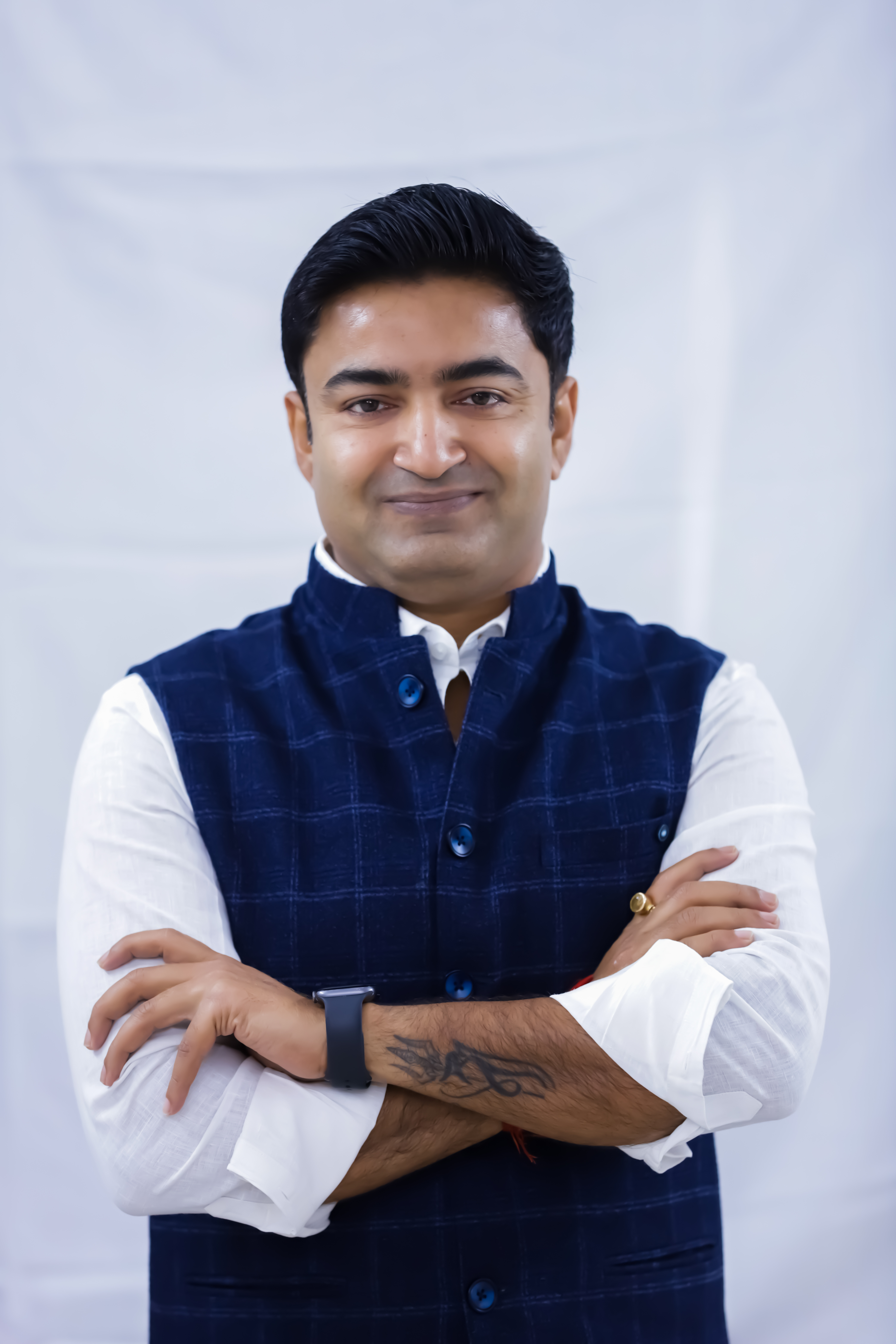

Member of the Uttar Pradesh legislative assembly
- Incumbent
- Assumed office 11 March 2017
- Preceded by: Munindra Shukla
- Constituency: Bithoor

Personal details
- Born: 2 August 1983 (age 43) Bithoor, Kanpur (Uttar Pradesh)
- Party: Bharatiya Janata Party
- Occupation: MLA
- Profession: Politician

Abhijeet Singh Sanga (born 2 August 1983) is an Indian politician and a member of Uttar Pradesh Legislative Assembly. He represents the Bithoor assembly constituency of Kanpur Nagar district.

== Political career ==
Abhijeet Singh Sanga started his political career from Samajwadi Party then moved to Indian National Congress and contested 2012 U.P. Assembly election from AC Bithoor on Congress symbol. Until early 2017 he was Kanpur Gramin Congress President, then he joined BJP and contested Uttar Pradesh Assembly Election as Bharatiya Janata Party candidate and defeated his close contestant Munindra Shukla from Samajwadi Party with a margin of 58,987 votes. Again he became MLA by beating the same opponent in 2022.

== Posts held ==
#	From	To	Position	Comments
01	2017	Incumbent	Member, 17th Legislative Assembly	
