= Shahabad, Uttar Pradesh Lok Sabha constituency =

Former constituency of the Indian parliament in Uttar Pradesh

Coordinates: 27.6°N 79.9°E

Shahabad
- Former Lok Sabha constituency

Constituency details
- Country: India
- Region: North India
- State: Uttar Pradesh
- Established: 1962
- Abolished: 2008

Shahabad was a Lok Sabha constituency in Uttar Pradesh, India.

== Members of Parliament ==
Year	Winner	Party
1962	Yuvraj Dutta Singh	Bharatiya Jana Sangh
1971	Dharam Gaj Singh	Indian National Congress
1977	Ganga Bhakt Singh	Janata Party
1980	Dharam Gaj Singh	Indian National Congress (I)
1984	Dharam Gaj Singh	Indian National Congress (I)
1989	Dharam Gaj Singh	Indian National Congress
1991	Surendra Pal Pathak	Bharatiya Janata Party
1996	Iliyas Azmi	Bahujan Samaj Party
1998	Raghvendra Singh	Bharatiya Janata Party
1999	Daud Ahmad	Bahujan Samaj Party
2004	Iliyas Azmi	Bahujan Samaj Party
Constituency Demolished in 2008.

== See also ==
- Shahabad
- List of constituencies of the Lok Sabha
