= Pratibha Shukla =

Indian politician

Member of the Uttar Pradesh legislative assembly
- Incumbent
- Assumed office 11 March 2017
- Constituency: Akbarpur-Raniya Minister
- In office 2007–2012
- Constituency: Chaubepur

Personal details
- Born: 20 April 1960 (age 66) Kanpur (Uttar Pradesh)
- Party: Bharatiya Janata Party
- Profession: Business, Politician

Pratibha Shukla is an Indian politician and was member of the Uttar Pradesh Legislative Assembly.

== Personal life ==
She was born in a village Radhan of tehsil Bilhaur, Kanpur.

== Education ==
She got post graduate degree from CSJM University Kanpur in 1980.

== Political life ==
Initially she worked in public as basic social worker and joined political party Bahujan Samajwadi Party in 2006.

- 2007: elected as Member of Legislative Assembly of Uttar Pradesh from Chaubepur (Vidhan Sabha constituency) as Bahujan Samaj Party candidate.
- 2017: elected as Member of Legislative Assembly of Uttar Pradesh from Akbarpur-Raniya (Vidhan Sabha constituency) as Bharatiya Janta Party candidate. She got 87,430 votes in this election.
- 2022: elected as member of legislative assembly from Akbarpur Raniya constituency and sworn in as minister of state in the department of mahila kalyan, bal vikas evam pushtahar.
