= Raja Ram Pal =

Indian politician

- In office Member of Parliament: 2004-2009, 2009-2014
- Constituency: Akbarpur

Personal details
- Born: 20 November 1960 (age 65) sirhoi, Kanpur, Uttar Pradesh
- Party: Samajwadi Party since October 2021,BSP, INC
- Spouse: R.K.Devi
- Children: 2 sons and 1 daughter
- As of 22 September, 2006 Source: [Parliament of India official biography]

Raja Ram Pal (born 20 November 1960) is an Indian politician with the Samajwadi Party, and was a member of the 15th Lok Sabha from Akbarpur (Lok Sabha constituency). Earlier, as a member of the Bahujan Samaj Party (BSP), he had been a member of the 14th Lok Sabha from Bilhaur, before being expelled on 23 December 2005, along with ten others, after the sting Operation Duryodhana. The expulsion was sub judice when the 14th Lok Sabha finished its term.

== Life ==
The son of Ram Nath Pal and Rukmani Devi, Raja Ram was born in the town Sirohi and attended D.A.V. College, Kanpur. After his LLB, he joined the law profession. In 1996, he joined the BSP and was elected to the Uttar Pradesh Vidhan Sabha, and in 2004 to the 14th Lok Sabha.

During 1996-2002 he was member of Uttar Pradesh Assembly.

He is married to Mrs. R.K. Devi and has two sons and one daughter.

== Political career ==
In the sting Operation Duryodhana by the Noida based media firm Cobrapost, aired 12 December 2005 on the Indian Hindi news TV Channel Aaj Tak, Raja Ram Pal was caught on video accepting bribes of Rs. 35,000 for fielding questions in parliament.

At one point, he says that the price of getting MPs to sign on to any petition is Rs. 25,000 per MP. He wants the money in advance; he underlines this with a colourful Hindi couplet:

sasta roye baar-baar, mehnga roye ek baar
(if you throw little money you will cry again and again, but if you throw big money you will cry only once).

=== Expulsion from Parliament ===
On 23 December 2005 he was expelled from the Lok Sabha following the adoption of a motion calling for the expulsion of all 11 MPs caught in the sting.

The scam also led to Bahujan Samaj Party supremo Mayawati expelling him from the party, along with three others. Subsequently, he joined the Indian National Congress and was elected in the 2009 Indian general elections.

He joined the Samajwadi Party on a rally in presence of Party Chief Akhilesh Yadav in 2021.
