= Ghatampur Lok Sabha constituency =

Former constituency of the Indian parliament in Uttar Pradesh

Coordinates: 26.2°N 80.2°E

Ghatampur
- Former Lok Sabha constituency

Constituency details
- Country: India
- Region: North India
- State: Uttar Pradesh
- Established: 1957
- Abolished: 2008

Ghatampur was one of the 80 parliamentary constituencies of Uttar Pradesh till 2008. After delimitation of 2008, the constituency was dissolved.

== Assembly segments ==
No	Name	District	Electorate (2007)
269	Jahanabad	Fatehpur	2,23,982
278	Ghatampur	Kanpur Nagar	2,53,756
279	Bhognipur (SC)	Kanpur Dehat	2,52,658
280	Rajpur	Kanpur Dehat	2,49,952
284	Derapur	Kanpur Dehat	2,50,986

== Members of Parliament ==
Year	Member	Party
1957	Tula Ram	Indian National Congress
1962	Tula Ram	Indian National Congress
1967	Tula Ram	Indian National Congress
1971	Tula Ram	Indian National Congress
1977	Jwala Prasad Kureel	Janata Party
1980	Ashkaran Sankhwar	Janata Party (Secular)
1984	Ashkaran Sankhwar	Indian National Congress (I)
1989	Keshari Lal	Janata Dal
1991	Keshari Lal	Janata Dal
1996	Kamal Rani	Bharatiya Janata Party
1998	Kamal Rani	Bharatiya Janata Party
1999	Pyare Lal Sankhwar	Bahujan Samaj Party
2004	Radhey Shyam Kori	Samajwadi Party
2008 onwards : Constituency does not exist

== Election results ==
2004 Indian general election: Ghatampur
Party	Candidate	Votes	%	±%
SP	Radhey Shyam Kori	160,117	31.72	
BSP	Pyare Lal Sankhwar	1,49,805	29.67	
BJP	Kamal Rani	1,22,845	24.33	
AD(K)	Umakant Manjhi	46,022	9.11	
INC	Askaran Sankhwar	12,353	2.44	
Majority		10,312	2.05	
Turnout		5,04,766	41.80	
SP gain from BSP		Swing		

1999 Indian general election: Ghatampur
Party	Candidate	Votes	%	±%
BSP	Pyare Lal Sankhwar	1,56,582	28.06	
SP	Aruna Kumari Kori	1,56,477	28.04	
BJP	Kamal Rani	1,55,987	27.95	
AD(K)	Jagdish Chandra	57,799	10.36	
INC	Askaran Sankhwar	29,859	5.35	
Majority		105	0.02	
Turnout		5,58,114	50.16	
BSP gain from BJP		Swing		

1998 Indian general election: Ghatampur
Party	Candidate	Votes	%	±%
BJP	Kamal Rani	2,06,598	36.92	
SP	Shiv Kumar Beria	1,64,109	29.32	
BSP	Bhagwati Prasad Sagar	1,37,121	24.50	
AD(K)	Virendra	20,335	3.63	
JD	Keshari Lal	17,669	3.16	
INC	Dr. Pushpa	10,267	1.83	
Majority		42,489	7.60	
Turnout		5,59,653	51.01	
BJP hold		Swing		

1996 Indian general election: Ghatampur
Party	Candidate	Votes	%	±%
BJP	Kamal Rani	1,47,215	33.23	
BSP	Dhani Ram Sankhwar	1,36,064	30.71	
JD	Keshari Lal	92,442	20.86	
INC	Saroj Prasad	24,718	5.58	
AD(K)	Babu Lal	16,141	3.64	
Majority		11,151	2.52	
Turnout		4,43,075	40.76	
BJP gain from JD		Swing		

== See also ==
- Akbarpur Lok Sabha constituency
- Kannauj Lok Sabha constituency
- Etawah Lok Sabha constituency
- Jalaun Lok Sabha constituency
- Fatehpur Lok Sabha constituency
- Ghatampur
- List of constituencies of the Lok Sabha
