= Bhognipur Assembly constituency =

Constituency of the Uttar Pradesh legislative assembly in India

Bhognipur
- Constituency No. 208 for the Uttar Pradesh Legislative Assembly

Constituency details
- Country: India
- Region: North India
- State: Uttar Pradesh
- District: Kanpur Dehat
- Total electors: 345,274 (2022)
- Reservation: None

Member of Legislative Assembly
- 18th Uttar Pradesh Legislative Assembly
- Incumbent Rakesh Sachan
- Party: Bharatiya Janata Party
- Elected year: 2022

Bhognipur is a part of the Kanpur Dehat district of Uttar Pradesh and it comes under Jalaun Lok Sabha constituency.

== Members of Legislative Assembly ==
- 1957: Ram Swaroop, Independent
- 1962: Raj Narain Misra, Indian National Congress
- 1967: Keshari Lal, Samyukta Socialist Party
- 1969: Jwala Prasad Kureel, Indian National Congress
- 1974: Keshari Lal, Bharatiya Kranti Dal
- 1977: Mauji Lal Kureel, Janata Party
- 1980: Ganga Sagar Sankhwar, Indian National Congress (Indira)
- 1985: Radhey Shyam, Indian National Congress
- 1989: Pyare Lal Sankhwar, Janata Dal
- 1991: Pyare Lal Sankhwar, Janata Dal
- 1993: Bhagwati Prasad Sagar, Bahujan Samaj Party
- 1996: Radhey Shyam Kori, Bahujan Samaj Party
- 2002: Arun Kumari Kori, Samajwadi Party
- 2007: Raghunath Prasad Sankhwar, Bahujan Samaj Party
- 2012: Yogendra Pal Singh, Samajwadi Party
- 2017: Vinod Kumar Katiyar, Bharatiya Janata Party
- 2022: Rakesh Sachan, Bharatiya Janata Party

== Election results ==
=== 2027 ===
2027 Uttar Pradesh Legislative Assembly election: Bhognipur
Party	Candidate	Votes	%	±%
INDIA				
NDA				
BSP				
NOTA	None of the above			
Majority				
Turnout				
gain from		Swing		

=== 2022 ===
2022 Uttar Pradesh Legislative Assembly election: Bhognipur
Party	Candidate	Votes	%	±%
BJP	Rakesh Sachan	87,809	40.25	+6.65
SP	Narendra Pal Singh	75,916	34.8	+12.14
BSP	Juned Khan	47,332	21.7	−2.97
NOTA	None of the above	1,292	0.59	−0.15
Majority		11,893	5.45	−3.48
Turnout		218,144	62.27	−1.58
BJP hold		Swing		

=== 2017 ===
2017 Uttar Pradesh Legislative Assembly election: Bhognipur
Party	Candidate	Votes	%	±%
BJP	Vinod Kumar Katiyar	71,466	33.6	
BSP	Dharmpal Singh Bhadauria	52,461	24.67	
SP	Yogendra Pal Singh	48,181	22.66	
Peace Party of Indiay	Juned Khan	18,380	8.64	
NISHAD	Ajay Singh Bhadauria	11,415	5.37	
INC	Neetam Sachan	2,833	1.33	
NOTA	None of the above	1,565	0.74	
Majority		19,005	8.93	
Turnout		212,667	63.85	
BJP gain from SP		Swing		

=== 2012 ===
2012 Uttar Pradesh state assembly election: Bhognipur
Party	Candidate	Votes	%	±%
SP	Yogendra Pal Singh	57,555	29.31	
BSP	Dharmpal Singh Bhadauria	52,902	26.94	
INC	Neetam Sachan	34,814	17.73	
IND.	Mahesh Trivedi	23,455	11.94	
BJP	Rajesh Sachan	9,307	4.74	
Majority		4,653	2.37	
Turnout		1,96,396	64.27	
SP gain from BSP		Swing		

=== 2007 ===
2007 Uttar Pradesh state assembly election: Bhognipur
Party	Candidate	Votes	%	±%
BSP	Raghu Nath Prasad	36,829	32.47	
SP	Aruna Kumari Kori	33,733	29.74	
BJP	Ram Nath Kovind	26,550	23.40	
INC	Dhani Ram	9,060	7.98	
BJSP	Satya Prakash	1,683	1.48	
Majority		3,096	2.73	
Turnout		1,13,428	44.89	
BSP gain from SP		Swing		
