= Bilhaur Assembly constituency =

Constituency of the Uttar Pradesh legislative assembly in India

Bilhaur
- Constituency No. 209 for the Uttar Pradesh Legislative Assembly

Constituency details
- Country: India
- Region: North India
- State: Uttar Pradesh
- District: Kanpur Nagar
- Total electors: 3,90,927 (2022)
- Reservation: SC

Member of Legislative Assembly
- 18th Uttar Pradesh Legislative Assembly
- Incumbent Rahul Bachha Sonkar
- Party: Bharatiya Janta Party
- Elected year: 2022

Bilhaur is a part of the Kanpur Nagar district and it comes under Misrikh Lok Sabha constituency.

== Members of the Legislative Assembly ==
Year	Member	Party
1957	Brij Rani Devi	Indian National Congress
1957	Murli Dhar Kureel	Indian National Congress
1962	Murli Dhar Kureel	Indian National Congress
1967	Moti Lal Dehlavi	Samyukta Socialist Party
1969	Moti Lal Dehlavi	Samyukta Socialist Party
1974	Moti Lal Dehlavi	Bharatiya Kranti Dal
1977	Moti Lal Dehlavi	Janata Party
1980	Moti Lal Dehlavi	Janata Party (Secular)
1985	Hanuman Prasad Kureel	Indian National Congress
1989	Moti Lal Dehlavi	Janata Dal
1991	Shiv Kumar Beria	Janata Party
1993	Shiv Kumar Beria	Samajwadi Party
1996	Bhagwati Prasad Sagar	Bahujan Samaj Party
2002	Shiv Kumar Beria	Samajwadi Party
2007	Kamlesh Chandra Diwakar	Bahujan Samaj Party
2012	Arun Kumari Kori	Samajwadi Party
2017	Bhagwati Prasad Sagar	Bharatiya Janata Party
2022	Rahul Bachha Sonkar	Bharatiya Janata Party

== Election results ==
=== 2027 ===
2027 Uttar Pradesh Legislative Assembly election: Bilhapur
Party	Candidate	Votes	%	±%
INDIA				
NDA				
BSP				
NOTA	None of the above			
Majority				
Turnout				
gain from		Swing		

=== 2022 ===
2022 Uttar Pradesh Legislative Assembly election: Bilhaur
Party	Candidate	Votes	%	±%
BJP	Rahul Bachha Sonkar	123,094	50.34	+7.83
SP	Rachna Singh	80,743	33.02	+8.08
BSP	Madhu Gautam	31,426	12.85	−16.72
INC	Usha Rani	2,510	1.03	
NOTA	None of the above	1,664	0.68	−0.14
Majority		42,351	17.32	+4.38
Turnout		244,540	62.23	−1.51
BJP gain from SP		Swing		

=== 2017 ===
2017 Uttar Pradesh Legislative Assembly election: Bilhaur
Party	Candidate	Votes	%	±%
BJP	Bhagwati Prasad Sagar	102,326	42.51	
BSP	Kamlesh Chandra Diwakar	71,160	29.57	
SP	Shiv Kumar Beria	60,023	24.94	
NOTA	None of the above	1,965	0.82	
Majority		31,166	12.94	
Turnout		240,684	63.74	
BJP gain from SP		Swing		

=== 2012 ===
U. P. Legislative Assembly Election, 2012: Bilhaur
Party	Candidate	Votes	%	±%
SP	Aruna Kumari Kori	87,804	40.82	
BSP	Kamlesh Chandra Diwakar	71,747	33.36	
BJP	Rakesh Sonkar	25,473	11.84	
INC	Ramlakhan Gautam	22,640	10.53	
IND.	Shivkaran	2,426	1.13	
Majority		16,057	7.46	
Turnout		2,15,082	61.48	
SP gain from BSP		Swing		

=== 2007 ===
U. P. Legislative Assembly Election, 2007: Bilhaur
Party	Candidate	Votes	%	±%
BSP	Kamlesh Chandra Diwakar	52,729	41.70	
SP	Shiv Kumar Beria	48,770	38.56	
AD(K)	Satish Chandra	9,316	7.37	
INC	Ashok Dhanwik	6,285	4.97	
Independent	Ramdeen Kureel	5,167	4.08	
Majority		3,959	3.14	
Turnout		1,26,459	51.45	
BSP gain from SP		Swing		
