= Mahawar =

Mahawar may refer to:

- Alta (dye)
- Mahawar Koli, an Indian caste
- Mahawar Vaish, an Indian caste
