= Poonam Sankhwar =

Indian politician

Member of Uttar Pradesh Legislative Assembly
- Incumbent
- Assumed office March 2022
- Preceded by: Nirmala Sankhwar
- Constituency: Rasulabad

Personal details
- Born: June 30, 1977 (age 49) Patara, Kanpur
- Party: Bharatiya Janata Party
- Education: Chhatrapati Shahu Ji Maharaj University
- Profession: Politician

Poonam Sankhwar (born 1977) is an Indian politician from Uttar Pradesh. She is a member of the Uttar Pradesh Legislative Assembly from Rasulabad Assembly constituency which is reserved for the SC community in Kanpur Dehat district. She represents the Bharatiya Janata Party. She won the 2022 Uttar Pradesh Legislative Assembly election.

== Early life and education ==
Sankhwar was born on 30 June 1977 in Patara, Kanpur to Ganga Sagar Sankhwar. She married Ramesh Chandra Gautam, a government employee. She does animal farming and agriculture. She completed her post-graduation in sociology in 2001 at CSJM University, Kanpur.

== Career ==
Sankhwar won the 2022 Uttar Pradesh Legislative Assembly election from Rasulabad Assembly constituency representing Bharatiya Janata Party. She polled 91,783 votes and defeated Kamlesh Chandra Diwakar of Samajwadi Party by a margin of 21,512 votes. In 2017, she contested the 2017 Uttar Pradesh Legislative Assembly election on Bahujan Samaj Party ticket and lost the election. She polled 41,060 votes and finished third behind winner Nirmala Sankhwar of the BJP, who got 88,390 votes, and Arun Kumari Kori of Samajwadi Party who polled 54,996 votes.
