= Kamal Rani Varun =

Indian politician (1958–2020)

Minister of Technical Education Government of Uttar Pradesh
- In office 21 August 2019 – 2 August 2020
- Chief Minister: Yogi Adityanath
- Preceded by: Ashutosh Tandon
- Succeeded by: Jitin Prasada

Member of Uttar Pradesh Legislative Assembly
- In office 2017–2020
- Preceded by: Indrajeet Kori
- Succeeded by: Upendra Nath Paswan
- Constituency: Ghatampur

Member of Parliament, Lok Sabha
- In office 1996–1999
- Preceded by: Keshari Lal Kureel
- Succeeded by: Pyare Lal Sankhwar
- Constituency: Ghatampur

Personal details
- Born: 3 May 1958 Lucknow, Uttar Pradesh, India
- Died: 2 August 2020 (aged 62) Lucknow, Uttar Pradesh, India
- Party: Bharatiya Janata Party
- Spouse: Kishan Lal Varun
- Children: One daughter

Kamal Rani Varun (3 May 1958 – 2 August 2020) was an Indian politician and Cabinet Minister in the Government of Uttar Pradesh. She was member of Uttar Pradesh Legislative Assembly. She was also a member of Eleventh and Twelfth Lok Sabha.

== Early life and education ==
Rani was born on 3 May 1958 in Lucknow, Uttar Pradesh and married Kishan Lal Varun, a volunteer of the Rashtriya Swayamsevak Sangh, on 25 May 1975. She gave birth to a daughter and completed her M.A. in sociology at Kanpur University.

== Career ==
In 1989, Kamal Rani was selected by the Bharatiya Janata Party to contest from the Dwarkapuri ward of Kanpur in the municipal elections and was elected as a councillor for Kanpur Municipal Corporation. She was victorious again in 1995 and in 1996, BJP selected her to contest from the Ghatampur parliamentary constituency. She was victorious and was re-elected in the 1998 Indian general election. However, she lost to Pyare Lal Sankhwar in 1999 by 585 votes. During her tenure as a Member of Parliament, she served on advisory committees regarding labour, welfare, industry, women empowerment, official language and tourism departments.

Kamal Rani unsuccessfully contested the 2012 Uttar Pradesh Legislative Assembly election from the Rasulabad constituency, but was elected from the Ghatampur assembly constituency in the 2017 elections with 48.52% votes. Chief Minister Yogi Adityanath inducted her into the state's council of ministers on 21 August 2019. She became the only woman minister in the state since Rita Bahuguna Joshi had resigned after winning in the 2019 Indian general election.

== Death ==
Minister Kamal Rani had tested positive for COVID-19 on 18 July 2020, during the COVID-19 pandemic in India and was admitted to a hospital. She also suffered from diabetes, hypertension, hypothyroidism and double pneumonia. She died at 9:30 a.m. on 2 August at the Sanjay Gandhi Postgraduate Institute of Medical Sciences in Lucknow, due to complications brought on by the disease. She was aged 62 at the time of her death and was survived by her daughter.

Uttar Pradesh Chief Minister Yogi Adityanath expressed condolences for her demise and cancelled his scheduled visit to Ayodhya to check preparations for the bhumi pujan of Ram Mandir. The national flag was ordered to be flown at half-mast in her honour by the state government of Uttar Pradesh. President Ram Nath Kovind and Prime Minister Narendra Modi also expressed condolences. A day of mourning for her was declared by the state government on 2 August and her funeral was performed at the Bhairo Ghat in Kanpur, with a guard of honour present.
