= Sankhwar =

Sankhwar is an Indian surname. Notable people with surname include:

- Pyare Lal Sankhwar (born 1955), Indian politician
- Ashkaran Sankhwar (born 1945), Indian politician
- Nirmala Sankhwar (born 1969), Indian politician
