= Ambiyapur =

- Village
- Location in Uttar Pradesh, India Ambiyapur (India)
- Coordinates: 26°30′54″N 79°49′36″E
- Country: India
- State: Uttar Pradesh
- District: Kanpur Dehat

Languages
  - Official: Hindi
- Time zone: UTC+5:30 (IST)
- Vehicle registration: UP-
- Coastline: 0 kilometres (0 mi)

Ambiyapur is a village in Kanpur Dehat district in the state of Uttar Pradesh, India.

It is located in Derapur tehsil.

== Transport ==
Ambiyapur Railway Station is on the Agra-Kanpur rail route. It falls on the North Central Railway zone. Kanpur-Shikohabad Passenger and Kanpur-Tundla Passenger are among the main trains that pass through this station. To the east, Rura Station (9 km) is the nearest Station. Going west, Jhinjhak (10 km) is the next station. Kanpur Central Railway Station is the nearest major Railway station Nearest towns are Injuwarampur east east-south 2 km, Bhatauli-Rura east east-south 9 km, Rura to the east. Station Code: AAP

== Demographics ==
As of 2001 India census, Ambiyapur had a population of 974. Males constitute 54% of the population and females 46%.

== Geography ==
Ambiyapur is located at 26°30′54″N 79°49′36″E.
