= Saroj Kureel =

Indian politician

Saroj Kureel (born 1972) is an Indian politician from Uttar Pradesh. She is an MLA from Ghatampur Assembly Constituency which is reserved for SC community in Kanpur Nagar district. She represents the Apna Dal (Soneylal) party which is an ally of BJP. She won the 2022 Uttar Pradesh Legislative Assembly election.

== Early life and education ==
Kureel was born in Kanpur Nagar. She is a post graduate. She married Satya Prakash, a government employee. She is the daughter in law of Jwala Prasad Kureel, the Janata Party MP from Ghatampur in 1977.

== Career ==
Kureel won the 2022 Uttar Pradesh Legislative Assembly election from Ghatampur SC reserved Constituency representing Apna Dal (Soneylal) Party. She defeated Bhagwati Prasad Sagar of Samajwadi Party by a margin of 14,474 votes. Earlier, she contested on BSP ticket in 2012 and 2017 but came second. She lost to Kamal Rani of BJP by a margin of 45178 votes in the 2017 Uttar Pradesh Legislative Assembly election.
