= Rasulabad Assembly constituency =

Constituency of the Uttar Pradesh legislative assembly in India

Rasulabad
- Constituency No. 205 for the Uttar Pradesh Legislative Assembly

Constituency details
- Country: India
- Region: North India
- State: Uttar Pradesh
- District: Kanpur Dehat
- Total electors: 3,11,334 (2017)
- Reservation: SC

Member of Legislative Assembly
- 18th Uttar Pradesh Legislative Assembly
- Incumbent Poonam Sankhwar
- Party: Bharatiya Janta Party
- Elected year: 2022

Rasulabad Assembly constituency is a part of the Kanpur Dehat district of Uttar Pradesh and it comes under Kannauj Lok Sabha constituency.

== Members of the Legislative Assembly ==
Election	Member	Party
2012	Shiv Kumar Beria	Samajwadi Party
2017	Nirmala Sankhwar	Bharatiya Janata Party
2022	Poonam Sankhwar	Bharatiya Janata Party

== Election results ==
=== 2027 ===
2027 Uttar Pradesh Legislative Assembly election: Rasulabad
Party	Candidate	Votes	%	±%
INDIA				
NDA				
BSP				
NOTA	None of the above			
Majority				
Turnout				
gain from		Swing		

=== 2022 ===
2022 Uttar Pradesh Legislative Assembly election: Rasulabad
Party	Candidate	Votes	%	±%
BJP	Poonam Sankhwar	91,783	46.77	+0.1
SP	Kamlesh Chandra Diwakar	70,271	35.8	+6.76
BSP	Sima Singh	28,189	14.36	−7.32
NOTA	None of the above	1,298	0.66	−0.1
Majority		21,512	10.97	−6.66
Turnout		196,261	60.64	−0.19
BJP hold		Swing		

=== 2017 ===
2017 Uttar Pradesh Legislative Assembly election: Rasulabad
Party	Candidate	Votes	%	±%
BJP	Nirmala Sankhwar	88,390	46.67	
SP	Arun Kumari Kori	54,996	29.04	
BSP	Poonam Sankhwar	41,060	21.68	
NOTA	None of the above	1,421	0.76	
Majority		33,394	17.63	
Turnout		189,385	60.83	
BJP gain from SP		Swing		

=== 2012 ===
U. P. Legislative Assembly Election, 2012: Rasulabad
Party	Candidate	Votes	%	±%
SP	Shiv Kumar Beria	66,940	39.46	
BSP	Nirmala Sankhwar	50,105	29.53	
BJP	Kamal Rani	24,974	14.72	
INC	Om Prakash	13,068	7.70	
JKP(R)	Sangeeta Devi	12,673	7.47	
Majority		16,835	9.93	
Turnout		1,69,660	59.71	
SP win (new seat)				
