= Ram Prakash Kushwaha =

Indian politician

Member of Uttar Pradesh Legislative Assembly
- In office 2007–2012
- Constituency: Ghatampur Assembly constituency

Personal details
- Born: 7 January 1958 (age 68) Kanpur, Uttar Pradesh
- Party: Bahujan Samaj Party
- Spouse: Rita Kushwaha

Ram Prakash Kushwaha is an Indian politician based in Uttar Pradesh, who was elected to 15th Uttar Pradesh Legislative Assembly via 2007 Uttar Pradesh Legislative Assembly elections. Kushwaha was a member of Bahujan Samaj Party then, and was elected to Uttar Pradesh Legislative Assembly from the Ghatampur Assembly constituency of Kanpur Nagar district. In later years of his political career, he joined Samajwadi Party. He contested 2022 Uttar Pradesh Assembly elections from Akbarpur-Raniya Assembly constituency as Ghatampur constituency was then reserved for Schedule Castes after delimitation. He lost the election of 2022 to Pratibha Shukla of Bharatiya Janata Party.

== Life and political career ==
Ram Prakash Kushwaha was born on 7 January 1958 in Kanpur district of Uttar Pradesh to Deen Dyal Kushwaha in an Other Backward Class Hindu family. He completed his Doctorate after master's degree, and in 1984, he was married to Reena Kushwaha. In his election affidavit submitted to Election Commission of India, he declared himself to be associated with engineering works besides being a politician. His first stint as Member of Uttar Pradesh Legislative Assembly started in 2007, when he was elected from Ghatampur Assembly constituency. He defeated Rakesh Sachan of Samajwadi Party in 2007 assembly elections.

He also served as president of Gautam Buddha group of educational institutes for four years. Between 2008-09, he was the member of Estimates Committee of the Uttar Pradesh Legislative Assembly. Kushwaha has also been associated as an authority figure with Chhatrapati Shahu Ji Maharaj University, Kanpur.
