= Ashkaran Sankhwar =

Indian politician

Member of Parliament, Lok Sabha
- In office 1980–1989
- Preceded by: Jwala Prasad Kureel
- Succeeded by: Keshari Lal
- Constituency: Ghatampur, Uttar Pradesh

Personal details
- Born: 2 October 1945 (age 80)
- Party: Indian National Congress
- Other political affiliations: Samajwadi Party

Ashkaran Sankhwar (born October 2, 1945) is an Indian politician. He was elected to the Lok Sabha, the lower house of the Parliament of India from the Ghatampur constituency of Uttar Pradesh as a member of the Indian National Congress.
