= Shivnath Singh Kushwaha =

Former Deputy Speaker of Uttar Pradesh Legislative Assembly

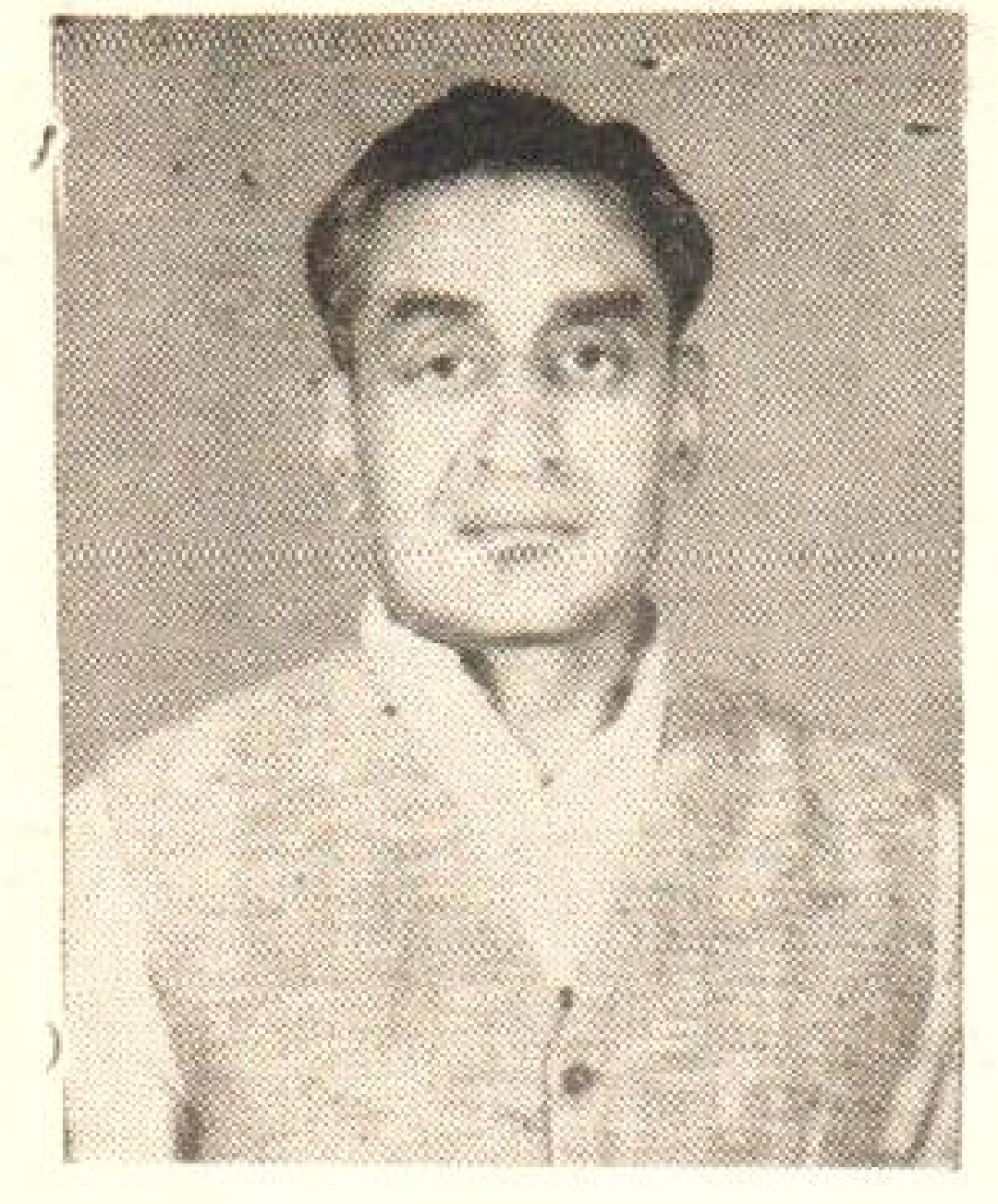

Deputy Speaker of Uttar Pradesh Legislative Assembly
- In office 1975–1977

Member of Uttar Pradesh Legislative Assembly
- In office 1962–1967
- Constituency: Ghatampur East Assembly constituency

Member of Uttar Pradesh Legislative Assembly
- In office 1974–1977
- Succeeded by: Ram Asrey Agnihotri
- Constituency: Ghatampur Assembly constituency

Member of Uttar Pradesh Legislative Assembly
- In office 1980–1985
- Constituency: Ghatampur Assembly constituency

Member of Uttar Pradesh Legislative Assembly
- In office 1985–1989
- Succeeded by: Ram Asrey Agnihotri
- Constituency: Ghatampur Assembly constituency

Member of Uttar Pradesh Legislative Assembly
- In office 1991–1993
- Succeeded by: Rakesh Sachan
- Constituency: Ghatampur Assembly constituency

Personal details
- Born: 1930 Makrandpur, Kanpur district
- Spouse: Ram Dulari Devi

Kunwar Shivnath Singh Kushwaha was an Indian politician based in Uttar Pradesh, who served as member of Uttar Pradesh Legislative Assembly for five terms. Kushwaha was also a minister in Government of Uttar Pradesh. He was in-charge of eight important ministries during his tenure. He was elected to Uttar Pradesh Legislative Assembly from Ghatampur Assembly constituency of the Kanpur district. Between 1975 and 1977, he also served as Deputy Speaker of Uttar Pradesh Legislative Assembly.

== Life and career ==
Kunwar Shivnath Singh Kushwah was born in Suryavanshi Kushwaha Family in a village called Makrandpur in Kanpur district of Uttar Pradesh in the year 1930. He completed his bachelor's degree and was married in 1946 to Ram Dulari Devi. They had one daughter together. He was an agriculturist, before joining active politics. His political career started with Socialist Party and later he joined Indian National Congress.

Shivnath Singh contested 1962, 1967, 1969 and 1974 Assembly elections from Ghatampur Assembly constituency of Uttar Pradesh against Indian National Congress candidate Beni Singh Awasthi. He was able to win the 1962 and 1974 elections against Awasthi, while latter secured victory in 1967 and 1969 elections. He is described as a down to earth political leader by contemporary news reports. It is reported that Singh used to travel on his bicycle during his election campaign, contrary to the other political leaders, who invest vast sum of money for their election campaigns. After serving two terms as member of Uttar Pradesh Legislative Assembly, he again won the assembly elections of 1980 and 1985, becoming the part of Uttar Pradesh Legislature for the third and fourth times. In 1991, he ran for the election for the fifth time and once again won as a member of Indian National Congress.

In 1975, due to his immense contribution to the assembly, he was appointed as Deputy Speaker of Uttar Pradesh Legislative Assembly. He also served as Chairman of many committees of the state assembly, which includes Committee on Privilege and Committee on Accommodation. He was first made a state minister in Vishwanath Pratap Singh cabinet in 1981. Thereafter, he served as minister in cabinet of both Sripati Mishra and Narayan Dutt Tiwari. He was also a member of Commonwealth Association and from 1974 to 1977, he served as president of Uttar Pradesh wing of Indo-Nepal Friendship Association.

He was recognised as a prominent member of Socialist Party and had served as member of Parliamentary Board of the party. He also worked for establishment of industrial enterprises in his constituency and due to his efforts, sugar mills, Industrial Training Institutes, Polytechnic Colleges were established in his constituency. Kushwaha also played significant role in implementation of Twenty Point Programme of Government of India. According to the official document of Uttar Pradesh Legislative Assembly, the Kanpur Rural region topped the indices gauging state's development on various fronts; this district was at forefront in implementation of various developmental schemes and later it came into existence as a separate region, due to efforts of Kushwaha. Besides setting up industrial plants, his tenure is also known for beautification of various river banks in order to promote tourism.

Kushwah died in 2016, after suffering from severe illness for months in Gwalior.

== Controversies ==
In 2020, a Special Investigation Team established to investigate the 1984 Anti-Sikh riots found his nephew, Raghavendra Kushwaha guilty for his alleged involvement in the riots. As per SIT report, Raghavendra was one of the prime accused of the riots in Kanpur district, who instigated the mob as well as led them to attack Sikh people in the violence which followed the assassination of Indira Gandhi by her Sikh bodyguards and One of his nephews, Vijay Singh Kushwaha, is said to have a long criminal history. According to locals, he has been involved in cases like murder, robbery and extortion, but due to lack of evidence and political influence, no action was ever taken against him.
