= Injuwarampur =

Injuwarampur Enjuva Rampur
- Village
- Nickname: Injua
- Location in Uttar Pradesh, India Injuwarampur (India)
- Coordinates: 26°47′52″N 79°54′30″E
- Country: India
- State: Uttar Pradesh
- District: Kanpur Dehat

Population (2001)
  - Total: 1,221

Languages
  - Official: Hindi
- Time zone: UTC+5:30 (IST)
- Vehicle registration: UP-77
- Coastline: 0 kilometres (0 mi)

Injuwarampur is a village in Kanpur Dehat district in the state of Uttar Pradesh, India.

It is in the tehsil of Derapur 7 kilometres from the town of Rura.

== Transport ==
Ambiyapur is the nearest railway station, 2 km northwest of the village.

== Demographics ==
As of 2001 India census, Injuwarampur had a population of 1221. Males constitute 51% of the population and females 49%.

== Geography ==
Injuwarampur is located at 26°47′52″N 79°54′30″E.

== Gallery ==
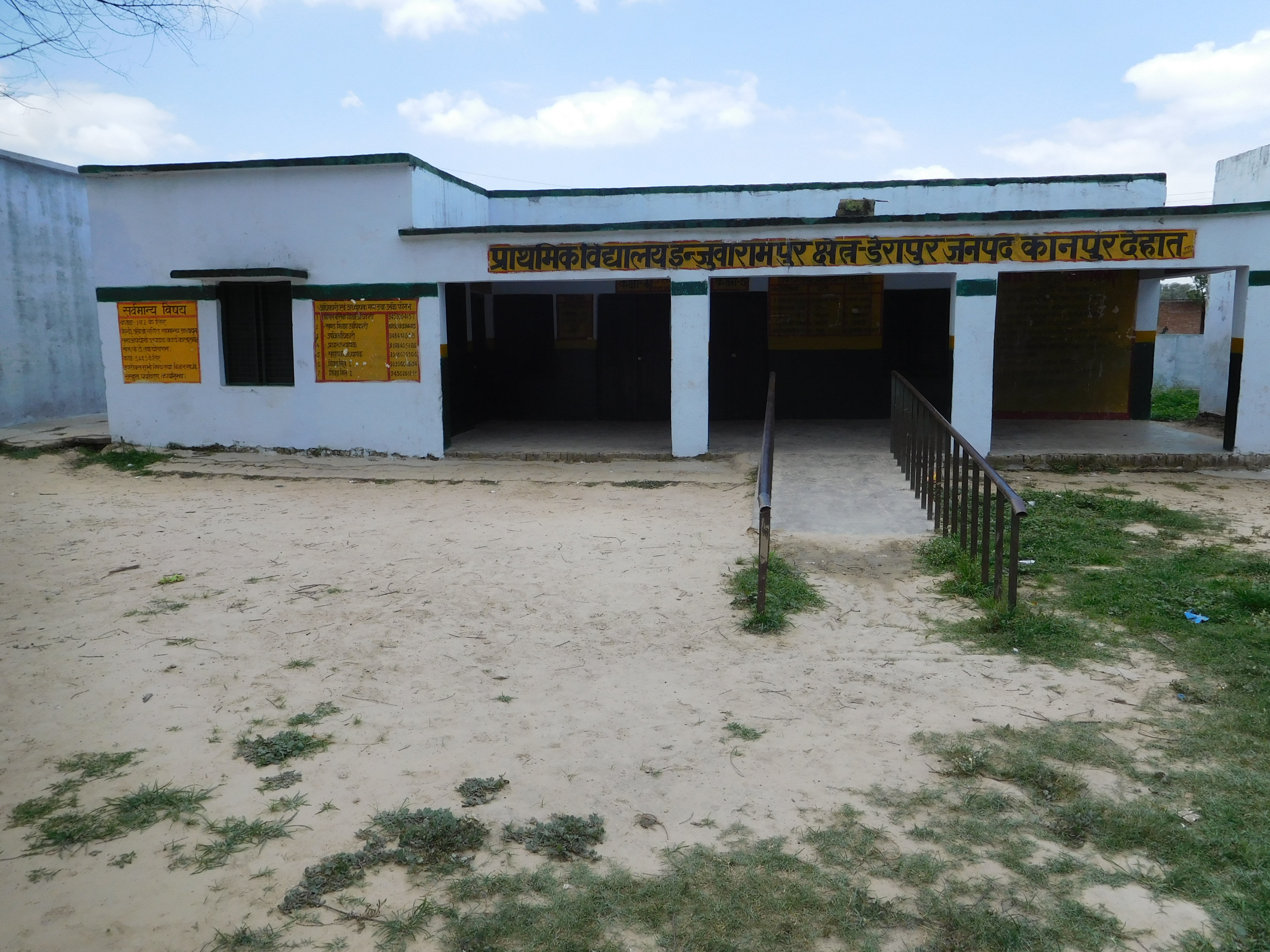
Primary School Injuwarampur

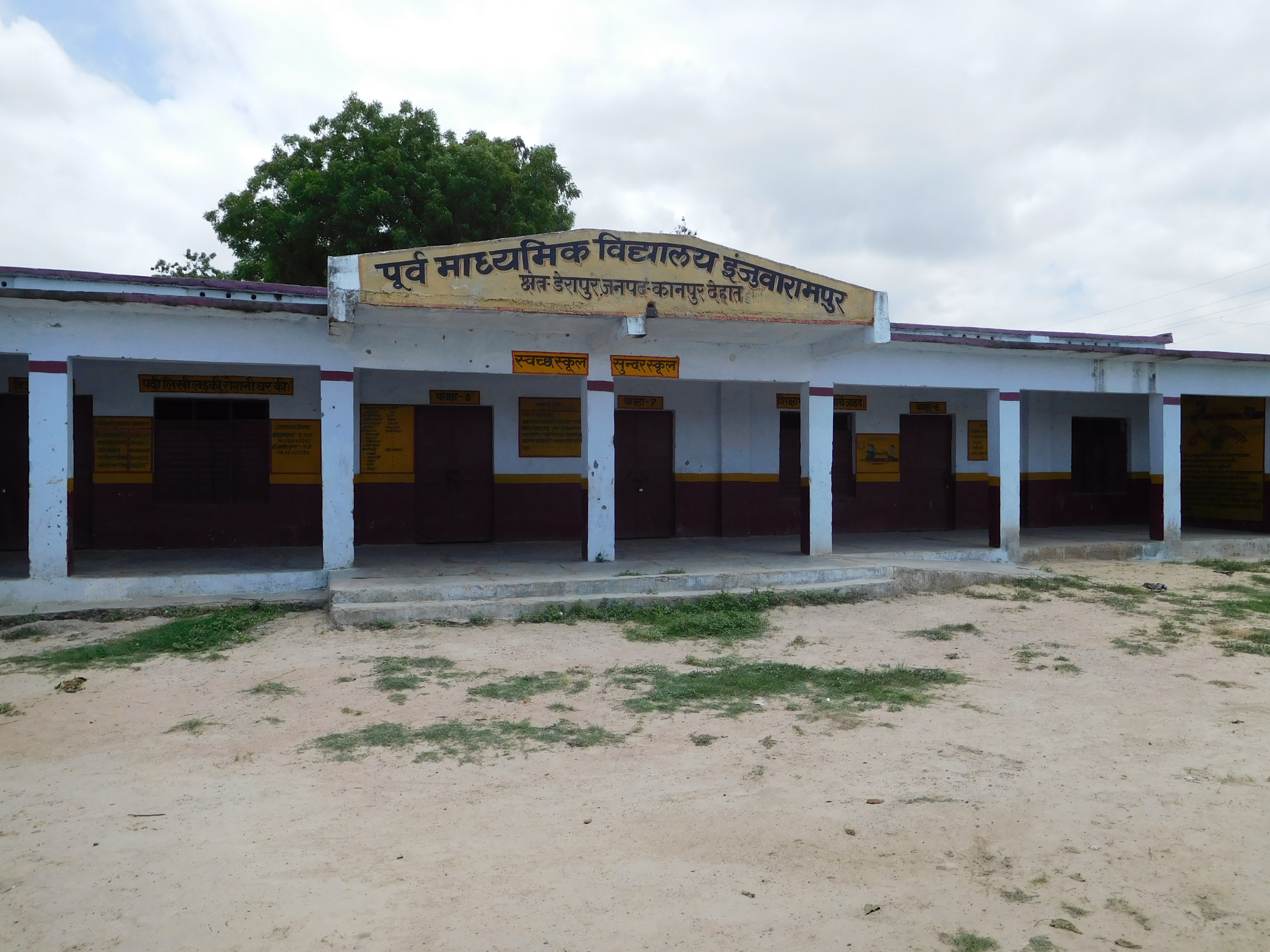
Junior High School, Injuwarampur

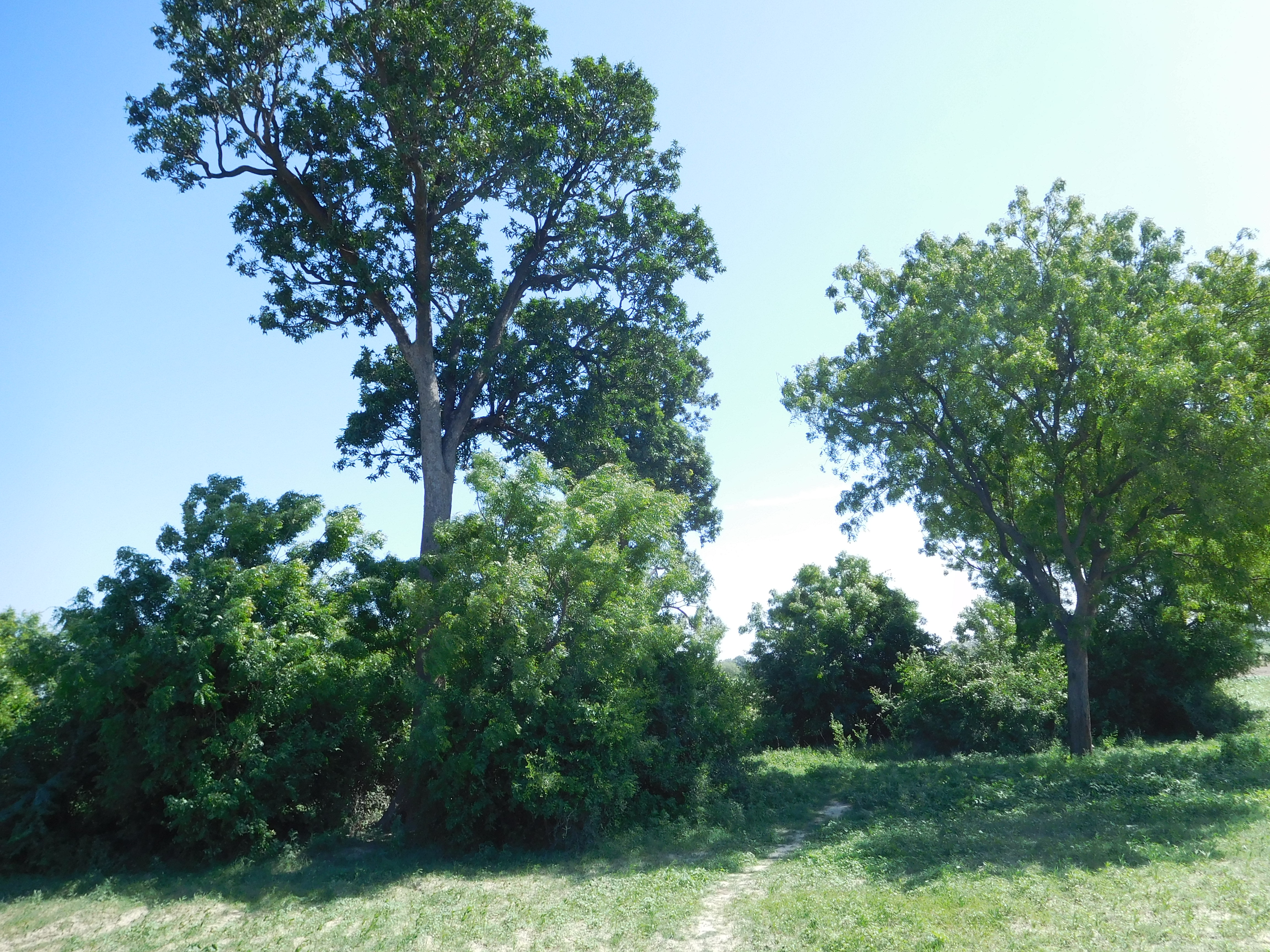
Misiran garden

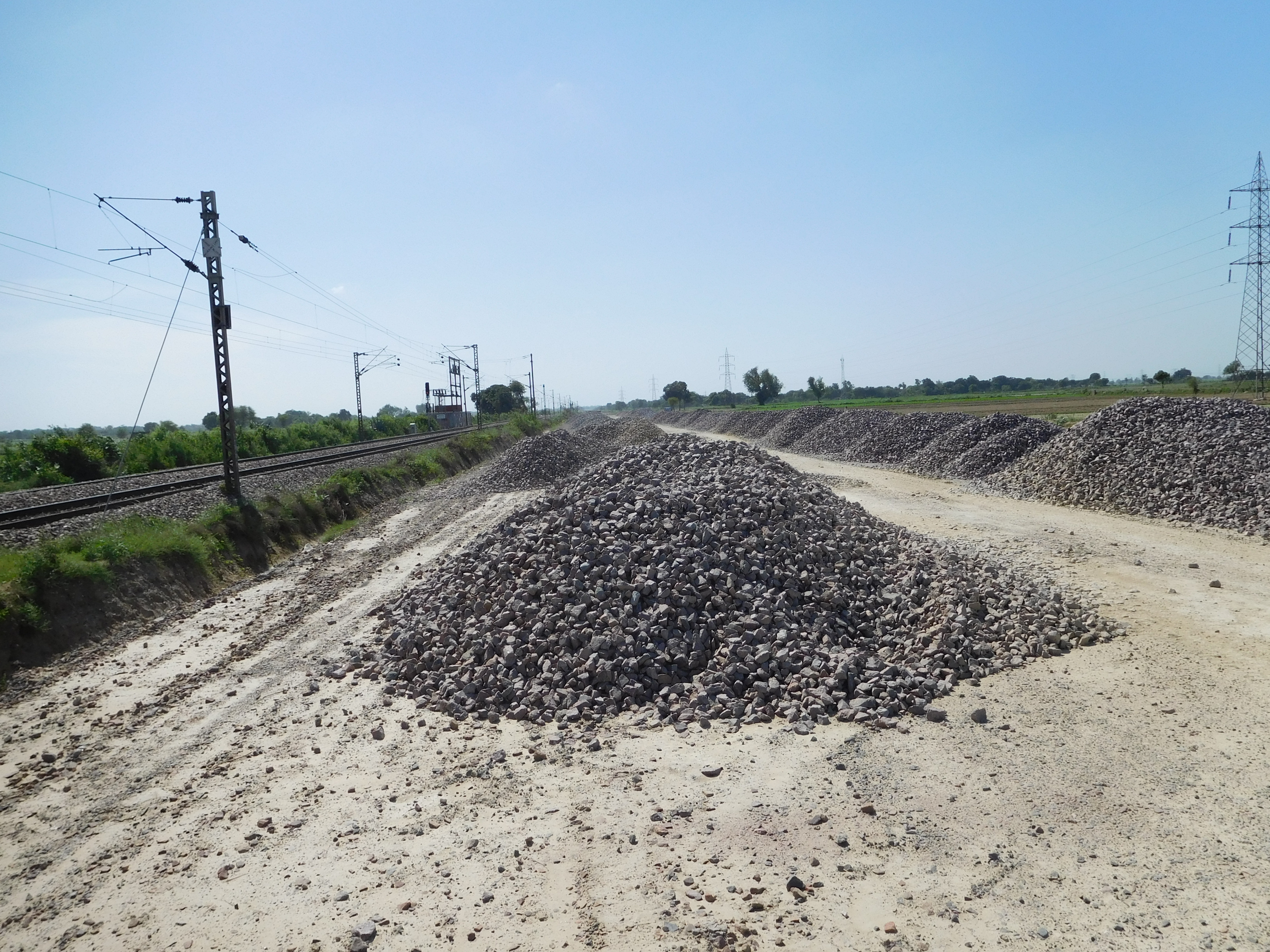
Railway Corridor
