= Radhey Shyam Kori =

Indian politician

MP
- In office 2004-2009
- Constituency: Ghatampur

Personal details
- Born: 7 July 1939 Sujnipur-Chilauli, Kanpur Dehat District, Uttar Pradesh
- Died: 12 August 2015 (aged 76) Kanpur
- Party: Samajwadi Party
- Spouse: Vilasidevi alias Savitri
- Children: 3 sons (late Rakesh, Ramsh Anoop) and 3 daughters (Malti, Kamla, Smita)
- Parent: Ghaseete Lal (father)
- Education: High school, R P S Inter College Rura, Kanpur
- As of 21 September, 2006

Radhey Shyam Kori (7 July 1939 – 12 August 2015) was an Indian politician who was MP for Ghatampur in Uttar Pradesh from 2004 to 2009.

== Early life ==
Kori was born in Chilauli (Sujneepur), tehsil Derapur district, Kanpur (at present Kanpur Dehat district), in a kori (koli) family which is enlisted in the Scheduled caste list in Uttar Pradesh. His father's name was Ghaseete Lal. He passed high school from R P S Inter College Rura, Kanpur. After leaving school, he became a follower of freedom fighter Shambhu Dayal Chaturvedi of village Badagaon Bhikkhi tehsil Derapur, district Kanpur. He stayed with Shambhu Dayal Chaturvedi as a family member until Chaturvedi's death. Shambhu Dayal Chaturvedi was a political guru to Radhey Shyam Kori.

== Politics ==
=== In Congress ===
His first step was from village politics. He officiated as Pradhn of Badagaon Bhikkhi of tehsil Derapur for about 20 years and also officiated as Block Pramukh of Derapur district, Kanpur. Shambhu Dayal Chaturvedi was a very active worker and leader of the Indian National Congress (INC), so Kori also joined the Indian National Congress with the help of Chaturvedi. After some time he became General Secretary of the INC party of Kanpur district.

=== In Bahujan Samajwadi Party ===
After a long period he joined the Bahujan Samajwadi Party in 1996 and became Member of Legislative Assembly from Bhognipur (sc) Constituency in 1996 and became the winner from this constituency.

=== In Samajwadi Party ===
In 2004 he joined Samajwadi Party and fought election to Parliament as the MP from Ghatampur Constituency (sc) and became the winner from this seat. He defeated Pyare Lal Sankhwar of BSP.
