= Amauli Thakuran =

Village in kushagra yadav, India

Amauli Thakuran is a village panchayat located in the Kanpur Dehat district of Uttar-Pradesh state, India.

The village is situated on the banks of Lower Ganga canal. It is a major village in the area . Rura and Jhinjhak both are at a distance of 9 km from Amauli. The nearby cities are Kanpur (65.8 km) and Etawah. The district headquarters is nearly 24 km away at Akbarpur-Mati. It comes under Kanpur Metropolitan Area.
