= Bhatauli, Kanpur Dehat =

- Village
- Location in Uttar Pradesh, India Bhatauli, Kanpur Dehat (India)
- Coordinates: 26.48°N 79.9°E
- Country: India
- State: Uttar Pradesh
- District: Kanpur Dehat
- Elevation: 127 m (417 ft)

Population (2001)
  - Total: 8,000

Languages
  - Official: Hindi
- Time zone: UTC+5:30 (IST)
- PIN: 209303
- Telephone code: 915111
- Website: www.kanpurdehat.nic.in

Bhatauli is an Indian village of Kanpur Dehat district in Uttar Pradesh.It is an adjacent to city Rura, Kanpur Dehat District, Uttar Pradesh, India. Bhatauli is the commercial center of grain and vegetables. It is well known place for potatoes cold storage. Many primary schools are in government sector while many others in private (recognized). Saraswati Gyan Mandir Inter College is also here. Jog Mai (Durga Mandir) is a center of faith. The Shiv Bajrang Dham Kishunpur is 200 metres (660 ft) away.

== Transport ==
It is connected with city Rura Railway Station (NCR) at distance 400 m. Rura is a main Railway Station of Kanpur Dehat District. It is connected with fast &super fast trains to Kanpur, Lucknow, Hawrah Delhi, Dehradoon, Meerut etc. It is linked with Golden Quadrilateral National High Way of India at Mugisapur & Akbarpur at a distances 18 km & 14 km. Akbarpur-Derapur Road (via Rura) passes through the middle of the town. Following main trains are available:

1. Gomti Express.
2. Agra-Lucknow Intercity Express.
3. Toofan Express
4. Anand Bihar-Kolkata Express.
5. Mahananda Express.
6. Rourkela/Jammu Tawi Muri Express
7. Unchahar Express.
8. Sangam Express.

== Geography ==
Bhatauli is located at 26.48°N 79.9°E. It has an average elevation of 127 metres (416 feet).

== Demographics ==
As of 2001 India Area map

== Gallery ==
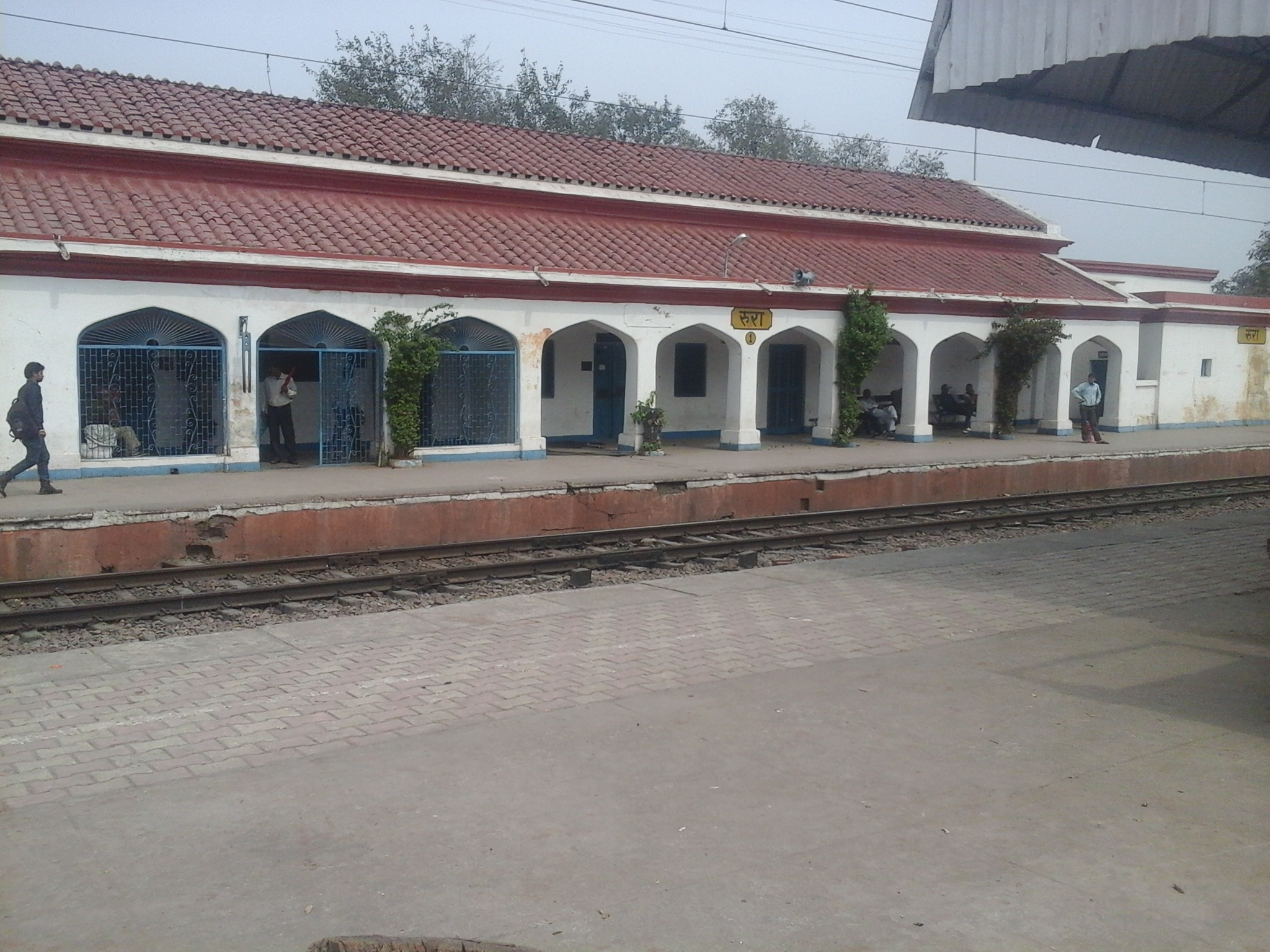
Rura Railway Station

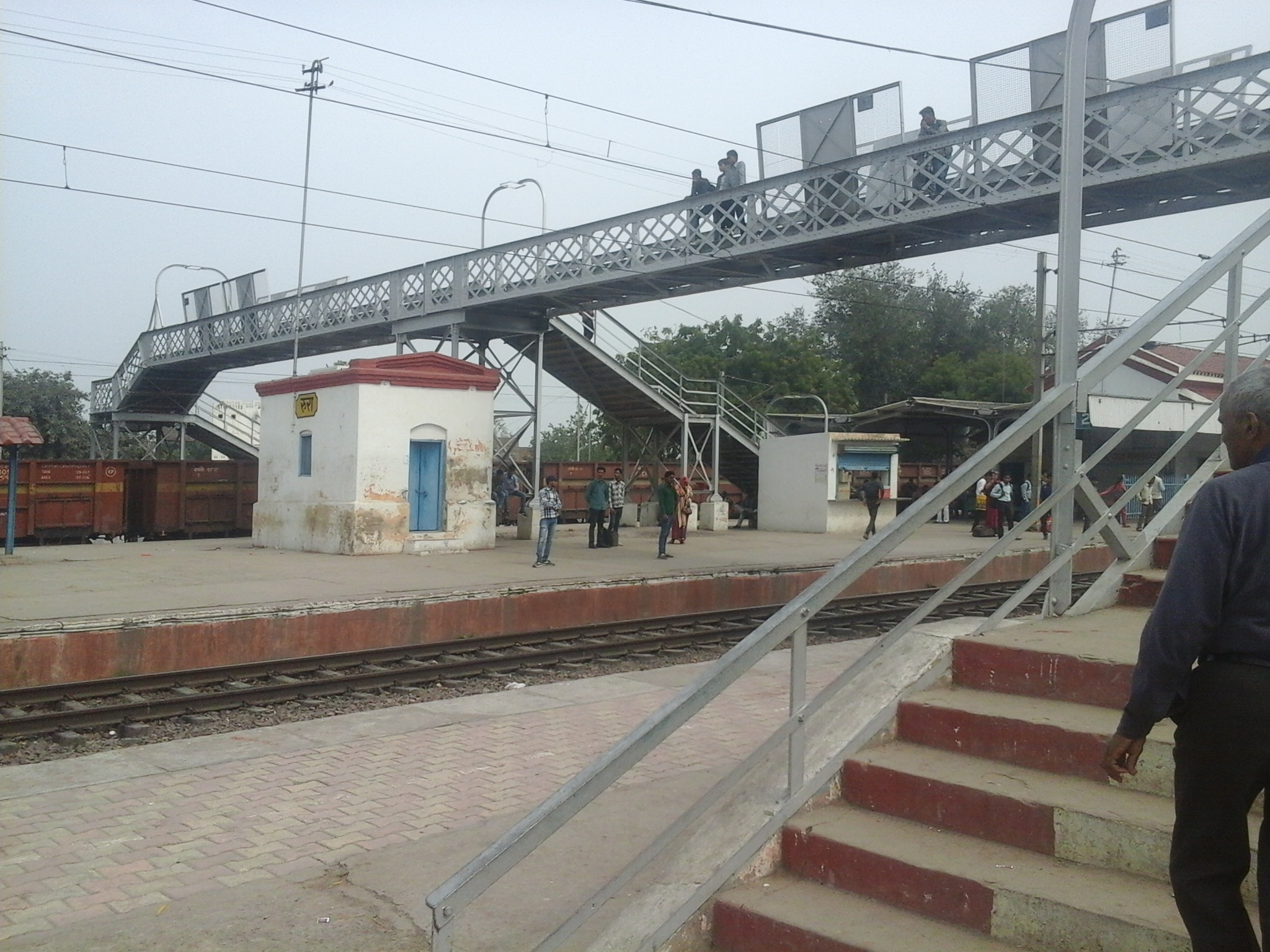
Over bridge

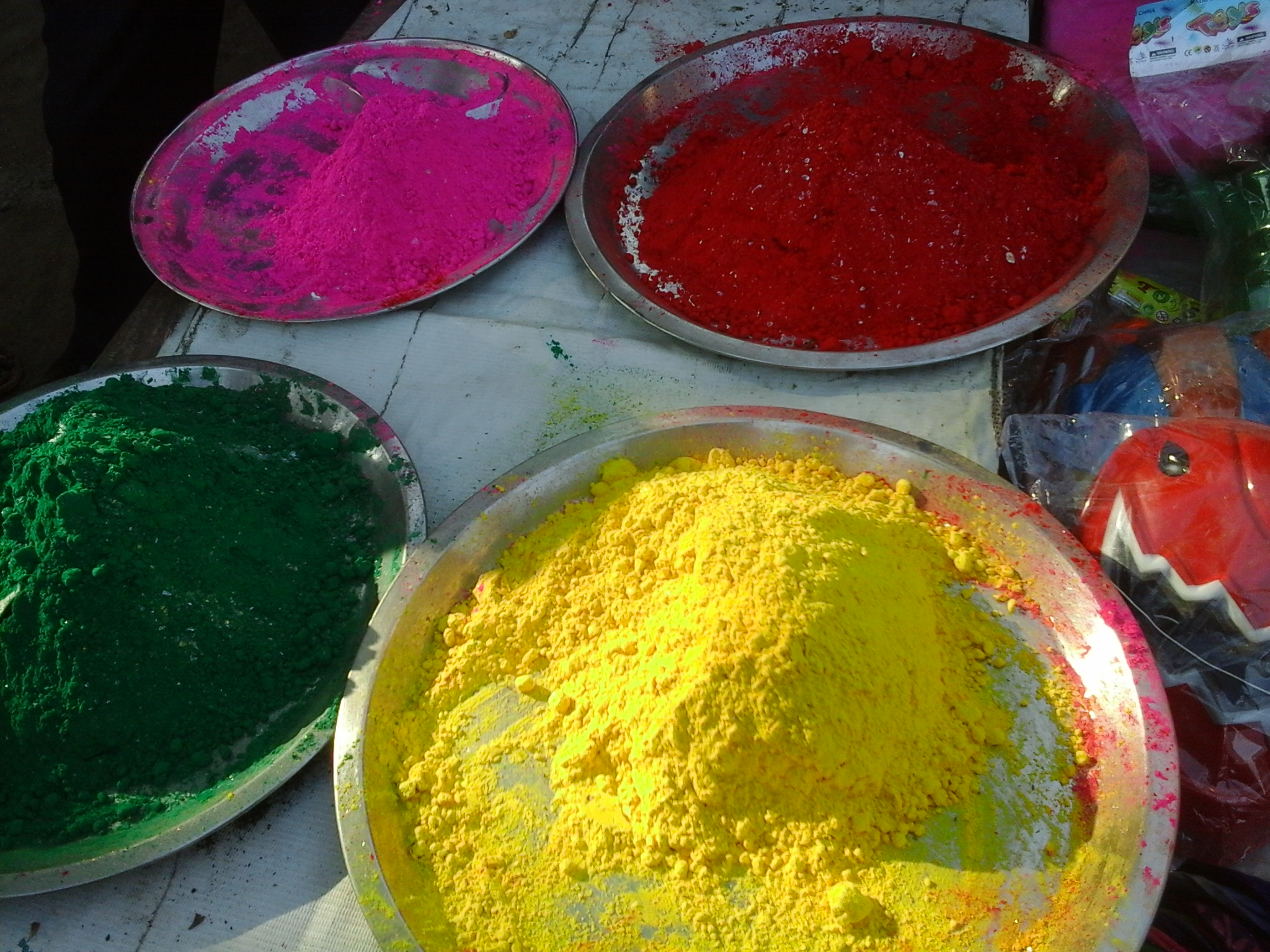
Holi -Holi

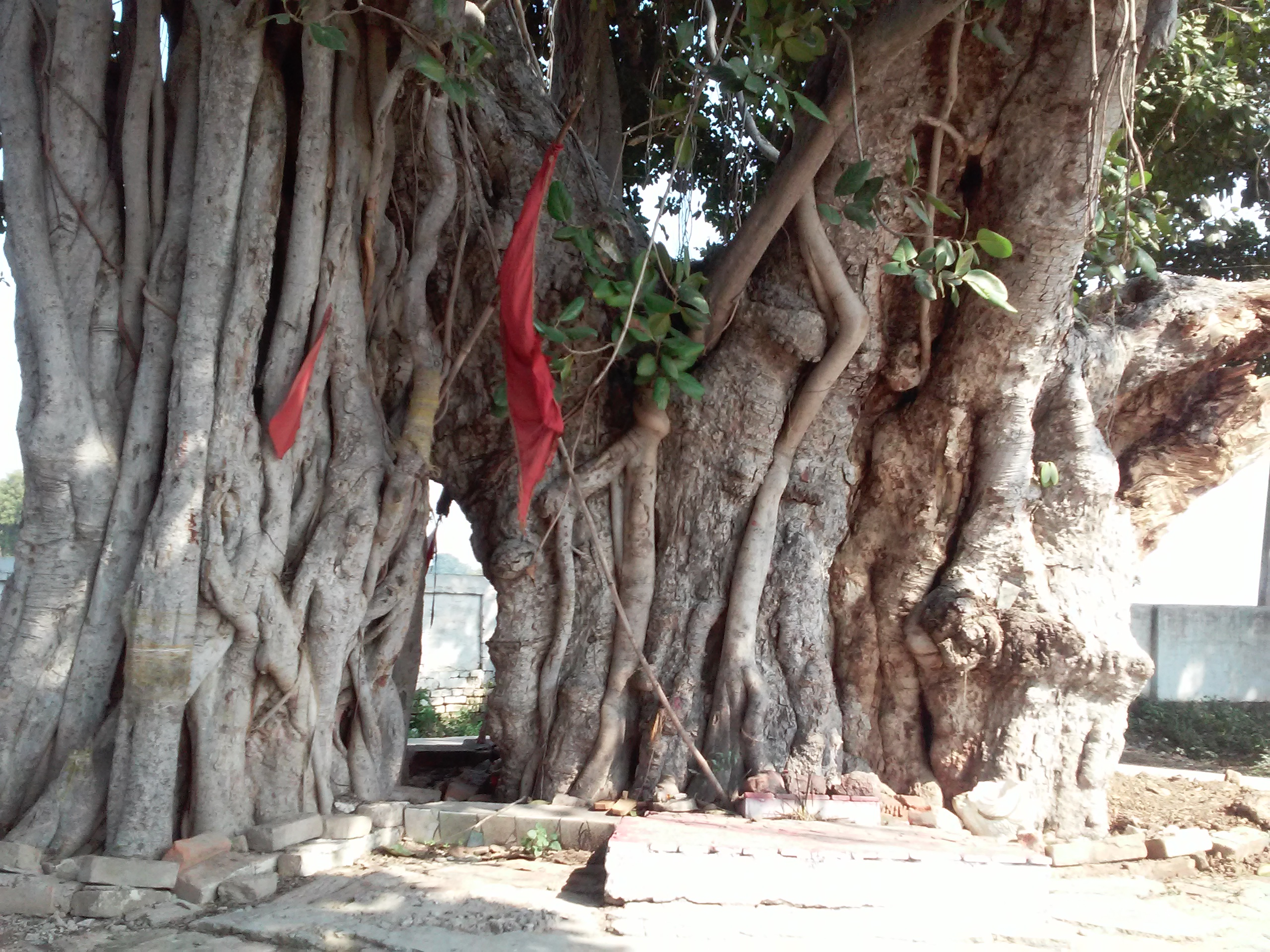
Banyan Tree (Shiv Bajrang Dham Kishunpur)

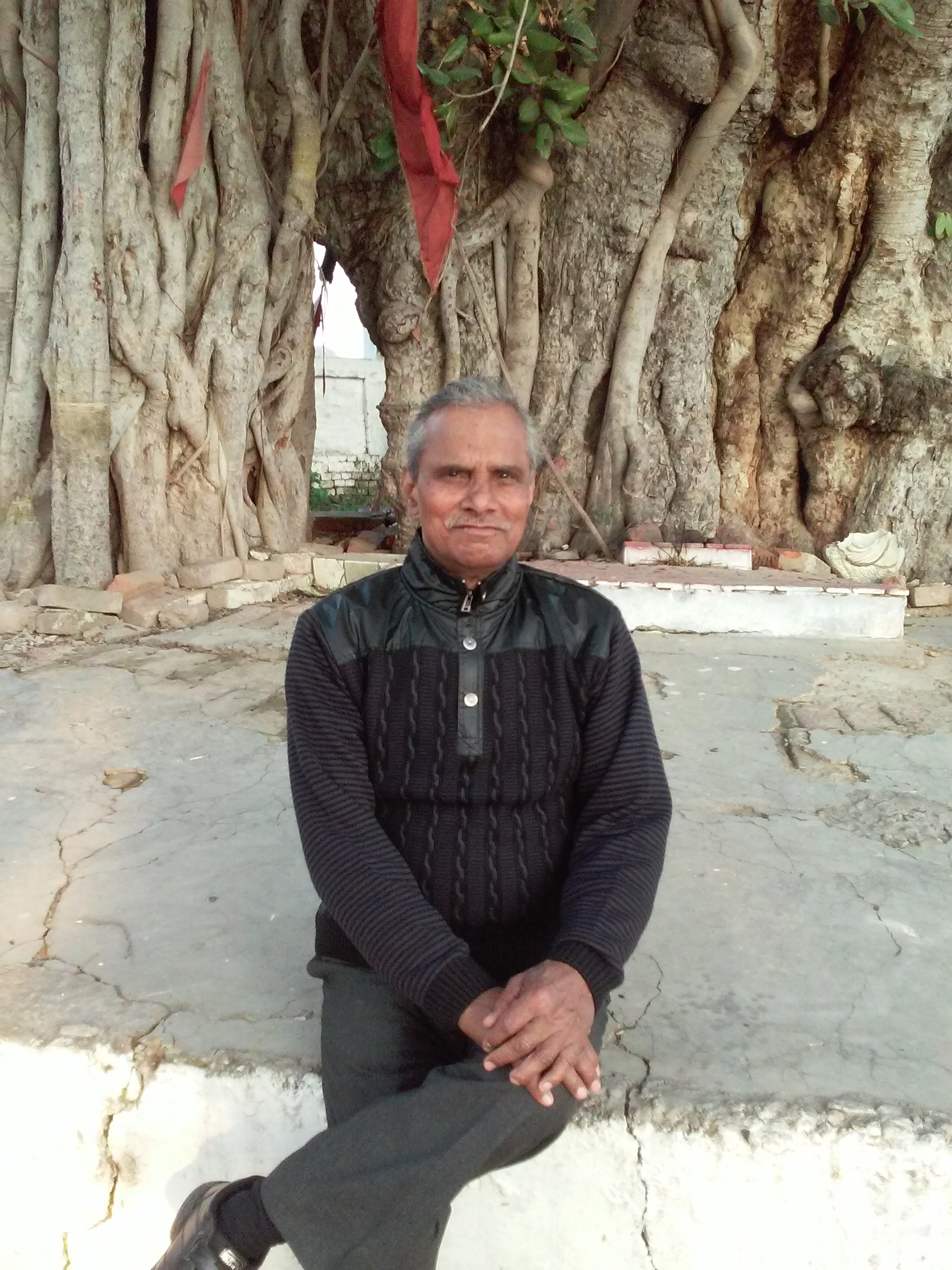
Baniyan Tree

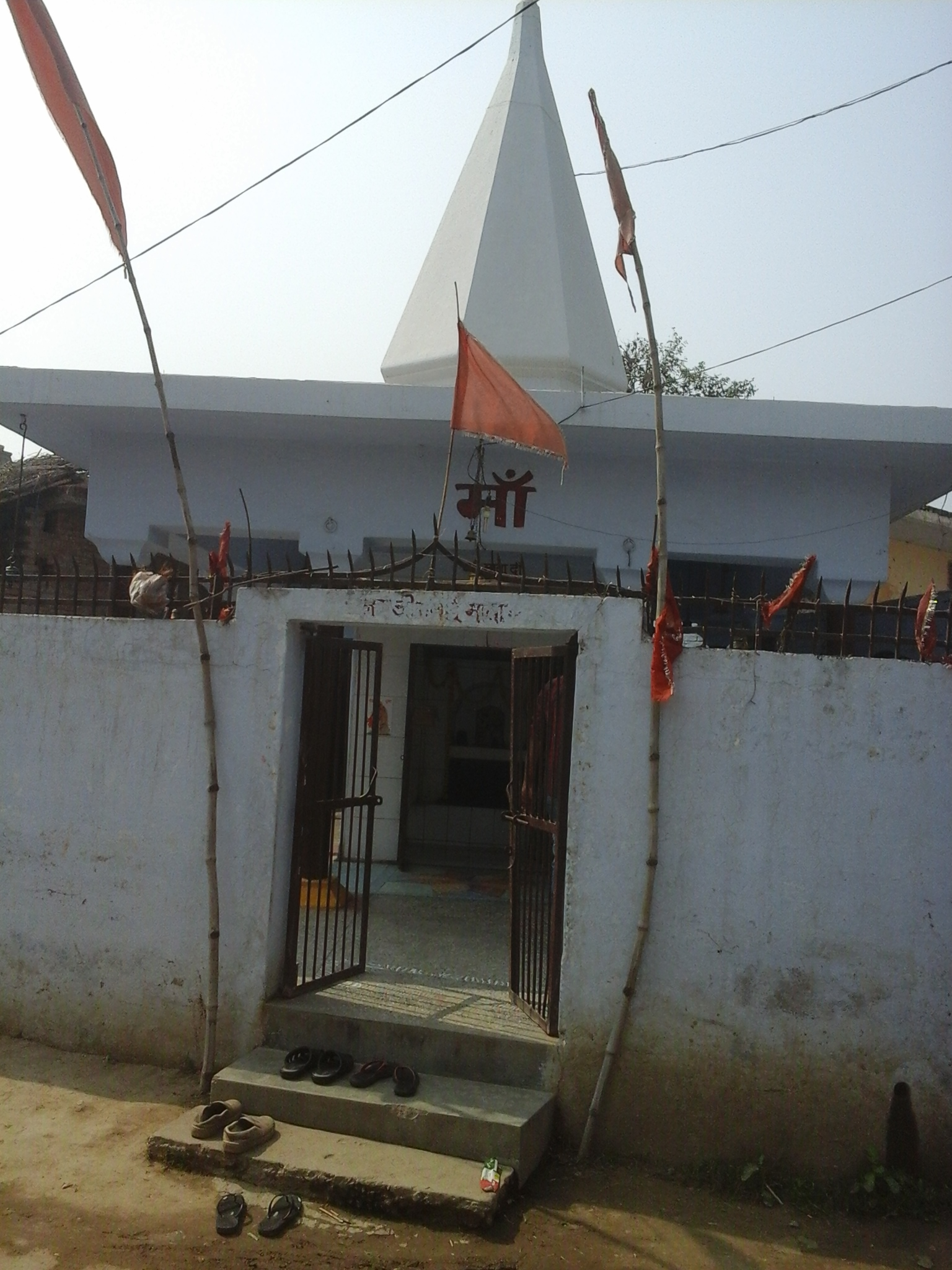
Jog Mai Mandir

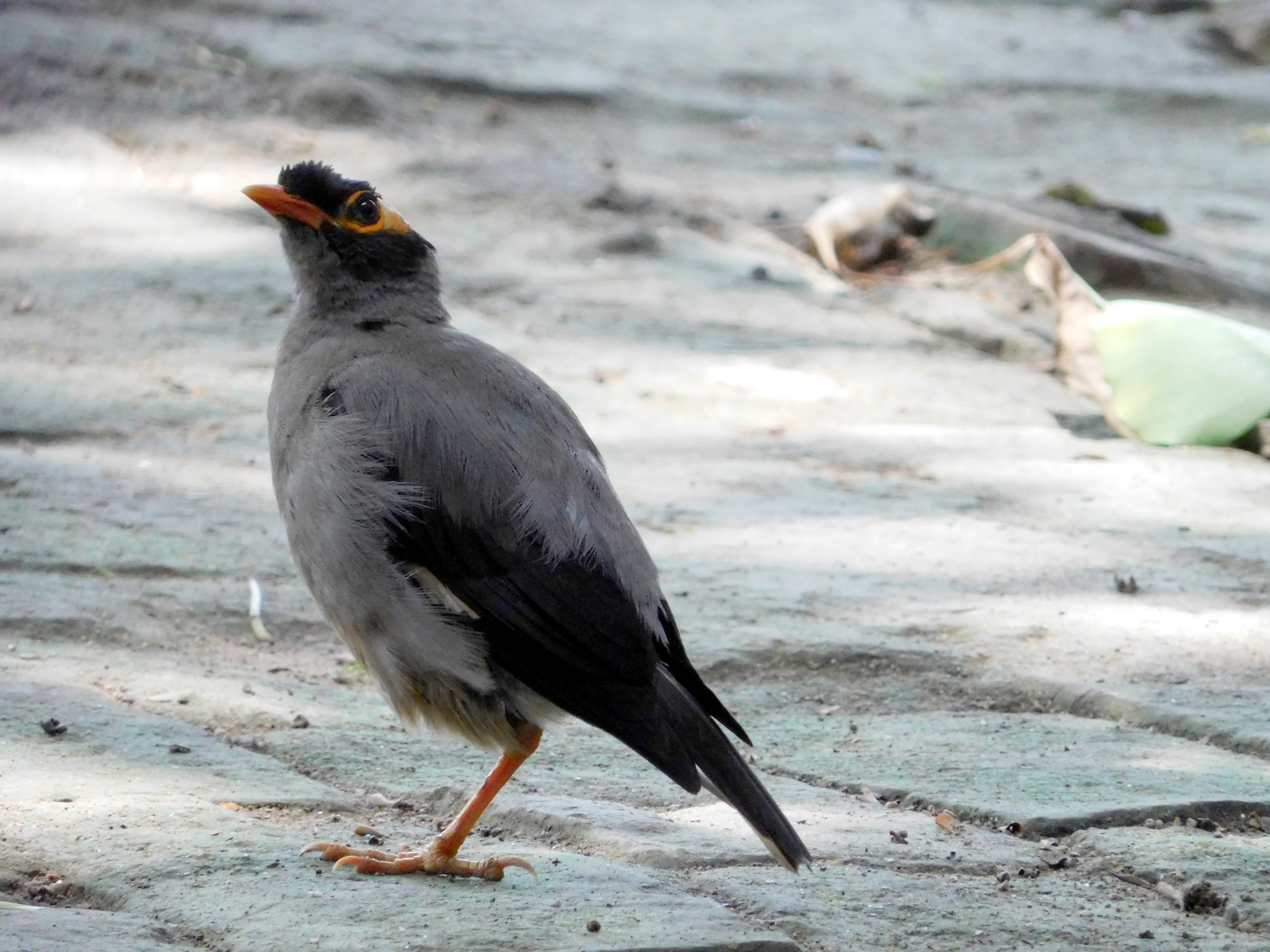
Starling (मैना )

.
