= Nirmala Sankhwar =

Indian politician

Member of Legislative Assembly, Uttar Pradesh
- In office 11 March 2017 – 10 March 2022
- Preceded by: Shiv Kumar Beria
- Succeeded by: Poonam Sankhwar
- Constituency: Rasulabad

Personal details
- Born: 1 February 1969 (age 57) Kanpur Dehat (Uttar Pradesh)
- Party: Bharatiya Janata Party
- Spouse: Dr. C. L. Gautam (m. 1986)
- Occupation: MLA
- Profession: Politician

Nirmala Sankhwar (born February 1, 1969) is an Indian politician and a member of 17th Legislative Assembly, Uttar Pradesh of India. She represents the ‘Rasulabad’ constituency in Kanpur Dehat district of Uttar Pradesh.

== Political career ==
Nirmala Sankhwar contested Uttar Pradesh Assembly Election as Bharatiya Janata Party candidate and defeated her close contestant Arun Kumar Kori from Samajwadi Party with a margin of 33,394 votes.

== Posts held ==
#	From	To	Position	Comments
01	2017	2022	Member, 17th Legislative Assembly	
