= Ghatampur Assembly constituency =

Constituency of the Uttar Pradesh legislative assembly in India

Ghatampur
- Constituency No. 218 for the Uttar Pradesh Legislative Assembly

Constituency details
- Country: India
- Region: North India
- State: Uttar Pradesh
- District: Kanpur Nagar
- Lok Sabha constituency: Akbarpur
- Total electors: 319,148 (2020)
- Reservation: SC

Member of Legislative Assembly
- 18th Uttar Pradesh Legislative Assembly
- Incumbent Saroj Kureel
- Party: AD(S)
- Alliance: NDA
- Elected year: 2022

Ghatampur is one of 403 legislative assembly seats of the Uttar Pradesh. It is part of the Akbarpur Lok Sabha constituency Lok Sabha constituency.

== Overview ==
Ghatampur comprises KCs- Rewna, Patara, Ghatampur, Baripal, bhitargaon block, Narwal tehsil and Ghatampur Municipal Corporation of Ghatampur Tehsil.

== Members of the Legislative Assembly ==
Year	Member	Party
1957	Jawala Prasad	Indian National Congress
1957	Brij Bihari Mehrotra	Indian National Congress
1967	Beni Singh	Indian National Congress
1969	Beni Singh	Indian National Congress
1974	Shivnath Kushwaha	Socialist Party
1977	Ram Asrey Agnihotri	Janata Party
1980	Shivnath Kushwaha	Indian National Congress (I)
1985	Shivnath Kushwaha	Indian National Congress
1989	Ram Asrey Agnihotri	Janata Dal
1991	Shivnath Kushwaha	Indian National Congress
1993	Rakesh Sachan	Janata Dal
1996	Raja Ram Pal	Bahujan Samaj Party
2002	Rakesh Sachan	Samajwadi Party
2007	Ram Prakash Kushwaha	Bahujan Samaj Party
2012	Indrajeet Kori	Samajwadi Party
2017	Kamal Rani Varun	Bharatiya Janata Party
2020^	Upendranath Paswan	Bharatiya Janata Party
2022	Saroj Kureel	Apna Dal (Soneylal)

- *By Election

== Election results ==
=== 2027 ===
2027 Uttar Pradesh Legislative Assembly election: Ghatampur
Party	Candidate	Votes	%	±%
INDIA				
NDA				
BSP				
NOTA	None of the above			
Majority				
Turnout				
gain from		Swing		

=== 2022 ===
2022 Uttar Pradesh Legislative Assembly election: Ghatampur
Party	Candidate	Votes	%	±%
AD(S)	Saroj Kureel	81,727	41.6	
SP	Bhagwati Prasad Sagar	67,253	34.23	
BSP	Prashant Ahirwar	32,472	16.53	−8.36
INC	Raj Narayan Kureel	3,798	1.93	−19.23
Jan Adhikar Party	Mamta Kushwaha	2,844	1.45	
ASP(KR)	Ram Jeevan Kori	2,009	1.02	
NOTA	None of the above	1,653	0.84	−0.3
Majority		14,474	7.37	−16.26
Turnout		196,466	60.55	−1.35
AD(S) hold		Swing		

=== 2020 bypoll ===
U. P. Legislative Assembly By Election, 2020: Ghatampur
Party	Candidate	Votes	%	±%
BJP	Upendra Nath Paswan	60,405	38.36	
INC	Kripa Shankar Sankhwar	36,585	23.23	
BSP	Kuldeep Sankhwar	33,955	21.56	
SP	Indrajeet Kori	22,735	14.44	
NOTA	None of the Above	1,555	0.99	
Majority		23,820	15.13	
Turnout		1,57,790	49.24	
BJP hold		Swing		

=== 2017 ===
2017 Uttar Pradesh Legislative Assembly election: Ghatampur
Party	Candidate	Votes	%	±%
BJP	Kamal Rani	92,776	48.52	
BSP	Saroj Kureel	47,598	24.89	
INC	Nandram Sonkar	40,465	21.16	
NISHAD	Rajendra	2,813	1.47	
Bharatiya Shakti Chetna Party	Ramjeevan	2,016	1.05	
NOTA	None of the above	2,160	1.14	
Majority		45,178	23.63	
Turnout		191,219	61.9	
BJP gain from SP		Swing		

=== 2012 ===
U. P. Legislative Assembly Election, 2012: Ghatampur
Party	Candidate	Votes	%	±%
SP	Indrajeet Kori	50,669	28.54	
BSP	Saroj Kureel	49,969	28.15	
INC	Nandram Sonkar	42,772	24.09	
BJP	Geeta Devi	23,472	13.22	
IND.	Dinesh Kumar Sonkar	1,765	0.99	
Majority		700	0.39	
Turnout		1,77,538	58.23	
SP gain from BSP		Swing		

=== 2007 ===
U. P. Legislative Assembly Election, 2007: Ghatampur
Party	Candidate	Votes	%	±%
BSP	Ram Prakash Kushwaha	65,793	47.32	
SP	Rakesh Sachan	63,316	45.54	
IND.	Hari Nath Singh	3,220	2.32	
RLD	Vimlesh Pathak	2,143	1.54	
AD(K)	Ashok Yadav	1,592	1.14	
Majority		2,477	1.78	
Turnout		1,39,037	54.79	
BSP gain from SP		Swing		

=== 2002 ===
U. P. Legislative Assembly Election, 2002: Ghatampur
Party	Candidate	Votes	%	±%
SP	Rakesh Sachan	44,108	33.76	
BSP	Raja Ram Pal	36,852	28.20	
INC	Shivnath Singh Kushwaha	26,224	20.07	
AD(K)	Vijay Sachan	10,505	8.04	
RLD	Vimlesh Pathak	7,724	5.91	
Majority		7,256	5.56	
Turnout		1,30,670	56.21	
SP gain from BSP		Swing		

U. P. Assembly Election, 2017 Kanpur Dehat Lok Sabha Constituency Summary
Party	Seats won	Seat change
Bharatiya Janata Party	5	▲4
Samajwadi Party	0	▼4
Bahujan Samaj Party	0	0
Indian National Congress	0	0

== See also ==
- List of Vidhan Sabha constituencies of Uttar Pradesh
