= Rahul Bachha Sonkar =

Indian politician (born 1989)

Member of Uttar Pradesh Legislative Assembly
- Incumbent
- Assumed office March 2022
- Preceded by: Bhagwati Prasad Sagar
- Constituency: Bilhaur

Personal details
- Born: 4 March 1989 (age 36) Kanpur, Uttar Pradesh
- Party: Bharatiya Janata Party
- Education: Bachelor of Education
- Alma mater: Chhatrapati Shahu Ji Maharaj University
- Profession: Politician

Rahul Bachha Sonkar is an Indian politician and a member of the 18th Uttar Pradesh Assembly from the Bilhaur Assembly constituency of the Kanpur Nagar district. He is a member of the Bharatiya Janata Party.

== Early life ==
Rahul Bachha Sonkar was born on 4 March 1989 in Kanpur, Uttar Pradesh, to a Hindu family of Kala Bachha Sonkar and Manhorma Sonkar. He married Mansi Sonkar on 6 December 2020. Kala Bachcha Sonkar was subject to 76 FIRs in a single day following his actions in protecting Hindus during the riots. Kala Bachcha Sonkar saved the lives of many Hindu families in the riots that broke out after the Babri demolition in Kanpur. He was killed on February 9, 1994, in a bomb attack, allegedly orchestrated by the Inter-Services Intelligence (ISI), with funding from Mumbai. The postmortem examination revealed the presence of around 40 nails in his remains, highlighting the severe nature of the bomb used. Despite the tragic loss, his son Rahul Bachcha Sonkar continues to honor his father's sacrifices. After Kala Bachcha Sonkar's death, the Mulayam Singh Yadav government faced significant criticism for its handling of the situation. His body was cremated secretly, and his family was denied the right to perform the last rites. Additionally, BJP supporters who protested the decision were assaulted.

== Education ==
Rahul Bachha Sonkar completed his education in 2012 with a Bachelor of Education at Chhatrapati Shahu Ji Maharaj University, Kanpur.

== See also ==
- 18th Uttar Pradesh Assembly
- Bilhaur Assembly constituency
- Uttar Pradesh Legislative Assembly
