= Tula Ram =

Indian politician (1914–1994)

Tula Ram (1 October 1914 – 27 June 1994) was an Indian politician who was a member of the Lok Sabha from Ghatampur (Lok Sabha constituency) in the state of Uttar Pradesh.

Ram was born in Village Puthian, Etawah district on 1 October 1914. He was elected to the 2nd, 3rd, 4th, and 5th Lok Sabha from Ghatampur. Ram died in Etawah on 27 June 1994, at the age of 79.
