= Padri Lalpur =

Padri Lalpur, Kanpur
- Village
- Location in Uttar Pradesh, India Padri Lalpur, Kanpur (India)
- Coordinates: 26°13′50″N 80°14′03.04″E
- Country: India
- State: Uttar Pradesh
- District: Kanpur

Languages
  - Official: Hindi
- Time zone: UTC+5:30 (IST)
- Vehicle registration: UP-78
- Coastline: 0 kilometres (0 mi)
- Website: up.gov.in

Padri Lalpur is a village in Patara block of Ghatampur tehsil, in the district of Kanpur Nagar, in the Kanpur division of Uttar Pradesh state, India. It is 4 kilometres from Patara, 28 km from Kanpur and 115 km from Lucknow.
