= Mahawar Koli =

Subcaste of the Koli community

Mahawar, also known as Mahor and spelled as Mahaur, Mahour and Mahavar, is a sub-caste of the Koli caste in the Indian states of Rajasthan, Delhi, Punjab, Haryana, Uttar Pradesh and Madhya Pradesh. Mahawar Kolis Inter-marry with Shakya Kolis but not with any other Koli subcaste. The Mahawar Kolis along with other Koli subcastes Shakyawar, Jaiswar, Kabirpanthi ( who followed the Kabir Panth) and Shankhwar kolis of Uttar Pradesh tried to uplift the social status in Hindu society by supporting the 'All India Kshatriya Koli Mahasabha' leaders of Ajmer.

== See also ==
- List of Koli people
- List of Koli states and clans
- Mahawar Vaishya
