= Patara, Kanpur =

Patara, kurara Patara
- town
- Location in Uttar Pradesh, India Patara, kurara (India)
- Coordinates: 26°14′1″N 80°11′44″E
- Country: India
- State: Uttar Pradesh
- District: Kanpur

Languages
  - Official: Hindi
- Time zone: UTC+5:30 (IST)
- Vehicle registration: UP-
- Coastline: 0 kilometres (0 mi)
- Website: up.gov.in

Patara is a town in Kanpur Nagar district in the state of Uttar Pradesh, India. Patara is a Development Block in Ghatampur tehsil.

== Transport ==
Patara is well connected to rest of India by rail and road.

== Geography ==
Patara is located at 26°14′1″N 80°11′44″E.

== See also ==
- Padri Lalpur
