= Jwala Prasad Kureel =

Indian politician

Jwala Prasad Kureel (15 July 1915 – 25 February 1991) was an Indian politician from Uttar Pradesh. He was an MP of the 6th Lok Sabha in 1977 representing Janata Party. of Ghatampur, Kanpur Dehat, Uttar Pradesh. He was also a three time member of Uttar Pradesh Legislative Assembly.

== Personal life ==
The son of Raja Ram, Kureel was born on 15 July 1915. He was an Urdu and a Hindi teacher from 1935 to 1943.

== Career ==
Kureel won the Ghatampur Lok Sabha Constituency representing Janata Party in the 1977 Indian general election in Uttar Pradesh. He was a member of the 6th Lok Sabha from Ghatampur, in the erstwhile Kanpur Dehat district. He won from Bhoganipur Assembly Constituency in the 1969 Uttar Pradesh Legislative Assembly election on Indian National Congress ticket. In 1962, he won from Ghatampur West Assembly Constituency which is reserved for SC community representing Indian National Congress. He first won from Ghatampur in the 1957 Uttar Pradesh Legislative Assembly election on Congress ticket.

He also served as the convener of Harijan Sub-Committee of District Congress Committee, Kanpur, in 1946. He served Indian National Congress in several capacities including being a member of Provincial Congress Committee, Uttar Pradesh, and secretary, District Congress Committee, Kanpur 1953 and 1955. He was also the president of DCC from 1959 to 1965.
