= Mahawar Vaishya =

Category of Marwari Bania caste of the Hindu religion

Mahawar Vaishya is a category of Marwari Bania caste of the Hindu religion. They are general category and mostly based in Alwar, Gurugram, Jaipur, Mathura, Mandi Govind Garh, Rewari, Agra, Firozabad, Aligarh, Hasanpur and also across India and abroad. They believe in Hinduism, Vaishnav and Sanatan Dharma and are called Vaishnav Bania. They are not devotees of a single god but believe in multiple gods. They are usually vegetarian and avoid consuming alcohol.

The term "Mahawar" has historical significance and its origins are deeply rooted in the ancient practices and traditions of the community. The Mahawar also known as Mahor Vaishya community has a long-standing reputation for their charitable contributions and their prominent role in trade and commerce.

Dr. K. N. Mahawar's book, "Mahawar Vaishya Ka Itihaas," offers a comprehensive and well-researched exploration of the Mahawar Vaishya community, tracing its roots, origins, development, and contributions to the history of India, both before and after independence. Every detail is meticulously supported by primary and secondary sources, and field verification. This book is highly recommended for anyone wishing to gain a thorough and factual understanding of the Mahawar Vaishya community.

== Origin of the Term Mahawar ==
The Mahawar Vaishya community, a prominent sub-caste within the Bania . community, prides itself on being one of the foremost business classes. According to this community, the term "Mahawar" originates from the combination of two Sanskrit words: "Maha" meaning "great" and "war" meaning "businessman." Thus, "Mahawar" translates to "Great Businessman." This etymology underscores the community's esteemed reputation as skilled and prominent traders and entrepreneurs.

They are also known as Mahor vaishya, Mahavar vaishya, Mahawar vaishya but Mahajan It is worth noting that occasionally, the term Mahajan is also used by Brahmins, indicating the diverse use of the term across different communities.

== Surnames of the Mahavar Vaishya Community ==
Members of the Mahavar Vaishya community commonly use the surname "Gupta." Other surnames associated with this community include "Mahajan", "Mahor" and "Mahavar." These surnames reflect their heritage and esteemed status within the business classes.

== History ==
Mahawars has history as old as Lord Krishna, as there are many historic evidence exists for the existence of Mahawars during Lord Krishna's time both while in Mathura UP and in Dwarika Gujarat.

Mostly based in:

- Alwar and Jaipur District of Rajasthan
- Mathura District of Uttar Pradesh
- Sitapur District of Uttar Pradesh
- Budaun District of Uttar Pradesh
- Farrukhabad District of Uttar Pradesh
- Pilibhit District of Uttar Pradesh
- Etah District of Uttar Pradesh
- Mandi Govind Garh], [Jalandhar in Punjab
- Gurugram, Rewari of Haryana
- Haldaur of Uttar Pradesh
- Also across India and abroad

== Disambiguation ==
There is another community which also used surname as Mahawar and known as Mahawar Koli. The Mahawar Koli are mainly found in Rajasthan in cities like: Ajmer, Jaipur, Kota, Sawaimadhopur, Dausa, Alwar, Kaurali, and Bharatpur.

== Notable Figures in the Mahavar Vaishya Community ==
Among the notable figures claimed by the Mahavar Vaishya community is the great philanthropist (जन हितैषी ) Bhamashah . According to the community's traditions, Bhamashah is celebrated for his remarkable generosity. During the Battle of Haldighati, when Maharana Pratap was defeated and wandering in the forests with his family, Bhamashah offered his entire accumulated wealth to the Maharana. This substantial financial support revitalized Maharana Pratap, enabling him to rebuild his army and continue his struggle against the Mughals. With the resources provided by Bhamashah, Maharana Pratap successfully reclaimed significant territories from Mughal control.

Bhamashah is immortalized in history for his selfless contribution and unwavering dedication to his motherland. His legacy is a testament to his exceptional generosity and patriotism. Not only was he a financier and supporter of Maharana Pratap, but he also served as a statesman and advisor, playing a crucial role in the administration and military campaigns of Mewar. Bhamashah's contributions significantly influenced the course of Rajput resistance against Mughal dominance, earning him a revered place in Indian history.
