= Keshari Lal =

Indian politician

Keshari Lal केशरी लाल

Ex. M. P., Lok Sabha
- Constituency: Ghatampur

Personal details
- Born: 1924; Kanpur (Uttar Pradesh)
- Died: 25 April 2017; Kanpur (Uttar Pradesh)
- Political party: Janata Dal
- Children: Two Sons, One Daughter

Keshari Lal Kureel (1924-25 April 2017) is an Indian politician and member of Ninth and Tenth Lok Sabha. He was also elected to Uttar Pradesh Legislative Assembly two times from Bhognipur assembly constituency of Kanpur Dehat district.
