= Rakesh Sachan =

Indian politician from Uttar Pradesh

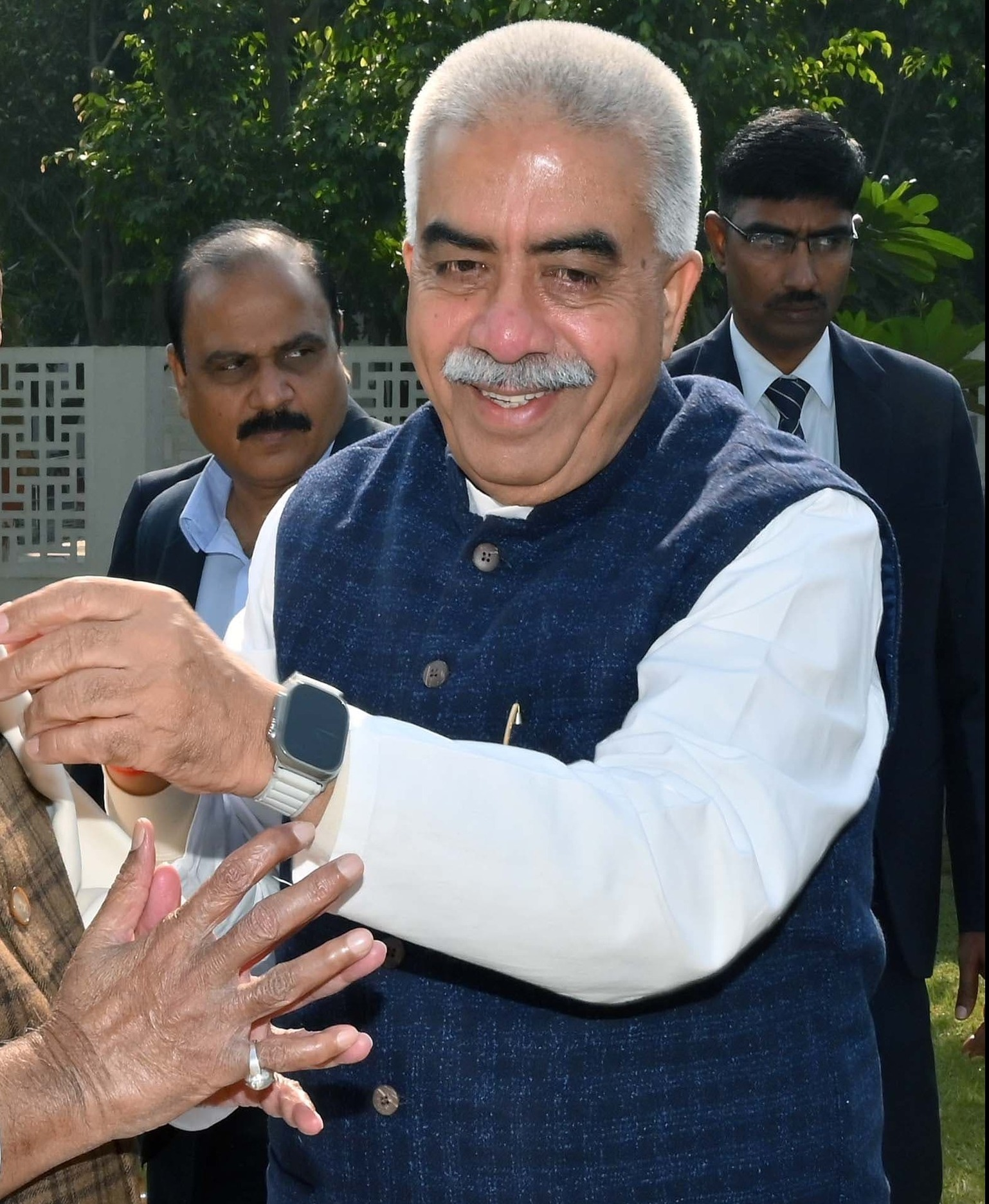

Minister of MSME, Khadi, Village Industries, Sericulture, Textile Government of Uttar Pradesh
- Incumbent
- Assumed office 25 March 2022
- Chief Minister: Yogi Adityanath

Member of the Uttar Pradesh Legislative Assembly
- Incumbent
- Assumed office 10 March 2022
- Preceded by: Vinod Kumar Katiyar
- Constituency: Bhognipur

Member of 15th Lok Sabha
- In office 16 May 2009 – 16 May 2014
- Preceded by: Mahendra Prasad Nishad
- Constituency: Fatehpur (Lok Sabha constituency)

Member of the Uttar Pradesh Legislative Assembly
- In office March 2002 – March 2007
- Constituency: Ghatampur
- In office March 1993 – March 1996
- Constituency: Ghatampur

Personal details
- Born: 20 December 1964 (age 61) Kanpur, Uttar Pradesh, India
- Party: Bhartiya Janta Party (since 2022)
- Other political affiliations: Indian National Congress (2019–2022); Samajwadi Party (before 2019)
- Spouse: Seema Sachan
- Children: 3 (2 Sons, 1 Daughter)
- Education: Kanpur University
- Occupation: Politician
- Profession: Politician

Rakesh Sachan (born 20 December 1964) is an Indian politician who is currently a Cabinet minister in the Ministry of MSME, Khadi, Village Industries, Sericulture, Textile, Government of Uttar Pradesh & Member of Uttar Pradesh Legislative Assembly 2022 (MLA) from Bhognipur constituency. He has also served two terms in the Uttar Pradesh Legislative Assembly (1993–96 and 2002–2007) and was elected as a Member of Parliament (MP) in 2009 from the Fatepur Lok Sabha constituency, on the Samajwadi Party ticket. He stood for re-election from the same constituency in 2014, again as a member of the Samajwadi Party, but lost.

Sachan switched political parties and joined the Indian National Congress on 2 March 2019. In the 2019 Indian general election, he was a candidate from the Fatehpur Lok Sabha constituency as a member of INC.

In January 2022, he joined the Bharatiya Janata Party (BJP), and became the Cabinet Minister in the Second Yogi Adityanath ministry. He contested from Vidhan Sabha constituency of Bhognipur in the 2022 Uttar Pradesh Legislative Assembly election.

== Early life and education ==
Sachan was born on 20 December 1964 in Kanpur, Uttar Pradesh to his father Udai Narayan Singh. He married Seema Sachan, and they have two sons and one daughter. He did his early schooling in Kanpur and attended Kanpur University where he attained a Bachelor of Science.
