= Pyare Lal Sankhwar =

Indian politician and social worker

Pyare Lal Sankhwar (born 10 March 1955) is an Indian politician and social worker. He was member of 13th Lok Sabha. He was elected from Ghatampur (Kanpur Dehat) seat of Uttar Pradesh on BSP ticket. He was also elected to Uttar Pradesh Legislative Assembly for two terms.
