= Ghatampur =

- Town
- Location in Uttar Pradesh, India
- Coordinates: 26.17°N 80.17°E
- Country: India
- State: Uttar Pradesh
- District: Kanpur Nagar
- Elevation: 122 m (400 ft)

Population (2011)
  - Total: 80,500

Languages
  - Official: Hindi
- Time zone: UTC+5:30 (IST)
- PIN: 209206
- Vehicle registration: UP78

Ghatampur is a town and a municipal board in Kanpur Nagar district in the state of Uttar Pradesh, India. It is 40 km away from Kanpur, the main industrial and educational hub of the state.

== Geography ==
Ghatampur is located at 26.17°N 80.17°E. It has an average elevation of 122 meters (400 feet) Ghatampur is situated about 30–40 km from southwest from Kanpur Downtown and about 130 km from Lucknow (State Capital).

== History ==
About 15 km North-East of Ghatampur is the small town of Bhitargaon, site of a historical temple from the Gupta Period. Ghatampur was part of Kanpur district but was merged with Kanpur Nagar after the district's bifurcation into Kanpur Nagar and Kanpur Rural.

Earlier, Ghatampur had both a Vidhan Sabha and a Lok Sabha constituency for the election process. The reshuffling of seats by the Election Commission of India led to the creation of the new Akbarpur Lok Sabha constituency in the 2008 General Elections.
