= Shiv Kumar Beria =

Indian politician

Shiv Kumar Beria शिव कुमार बेरिया

Ex. Cabinet Minister, Uttar Pradesh

Personal details
- Born: 5 January 1950; Mahedia, Fatehpur (Uttar Pradesh)
- Political party: Bhartiya Janata Party (2022-Inc.); Pragatisheel Samajwadi Party (Lohiya) (2019-2022); Samajwadi Party (1993-2019); Janata Dal (1989-1993)
- Spouse: Rama Devi (m.1979)
- Children: One Son, One Daughter
- Education: L. L. B.
- Profession: Politician, Advocate

Shiv Kumar Beria is an Indian politician and former Minister of Textile and Silk Industry in Akhilesh Yadav's cabinet. He was member of 10th, 11th, 12th, 14th and 16th Vidhan Sabha of Uttar Pradesh representing Rasulabad constituency of Kanpur Dehat district. In January 2022, Beria, a close aide of Samajwadi Party patriarch Mulayam Singh Yadav, joined the Bhartiya Janata Party (BJP), India's ruling party since 2014.
