= Bhagwati Prasad Sagar =

Indian politician

Member of Legislative Assembly, Uttar Pradesh
- Preceded by: Arun Kumari Kori
- Succeeded by: Rahul Bachha Sonkar
- Constituency: Bilhaur

Personal details
- Born: 28 May 1955 (age 71) Gopalpur, Kanpur Dehat (Uttar Pradesh)
- Party: Samajwadi Party
- Other political affiliations: Bharatiya Janata Party
- Spouse: Shakuntla Devi (m. 1981)
- Children: One son, two daughters
- Education: B.A., L.L.B.

Bhagwati Prasad Sagar (born 28 May 1955) is an Indian politician and former Minister of State (Independent Charge) for the Department of Labour Affairs in the Government of Uttar Pradesh. He was member of Uttar Pradesh Legislative Assembly representing Bilhaur constituency of Kanpur Nagar district.

He joined Samajwadi Party in 2022.
