= Rura =

- Town
- Location in Uttar Pradesh, India
- Coordinates: 26.48°N 79.9°E
- Country: India
- State: Uttar Pradesh
- District: Kanpur Dehat

Government
  - Chairman: Ram ji Gupta
- Elevation: 127 m (417 ft)

Population (2001)
  - Total: 15,206

Languages
  - Official: Hindi
- Time zone: UTC+5:30 (IST)
- PIN: 209303
- Vehicle registration: UP 77
- Website: www.kanpurdehat.nic.in

Rura is a Nagar Panchayat in Kanpur Dehat District in the Indian state of Uttar Pradesh on the banks of Lower Ganga canal, 49 km from Kanpur Nagar.

== Education ==
- R. P. S. Inter College
- Pt. O. P. Sharma Degree College
- Janka Devi Degree College
- C.D girls inter college
- pt. ichhchha ram inter college
- Infant public school
- Gyan Bharti Academy

== Places of worship ==
1. Vaaneshwar Mahadev Temple
2. Parhul Devi Temple, Lamahra
3. Durga Temple
4. Paathha Mai Temple
5. Balaji Temple, Dhanirampur
6. Shiv Bajrang Dham, Kishunpur
7. Bajrang Bali Dham Tanki Talab
8. Town Church
9. Thakur dwara Mandir Uchhava tola

== Transport ==
Rura bus stand is situated at Akbarpur Road and Derapur Road meet point. People can get bus for Akbarpur, Raniya, Fazalganj, Ramadevi and Galuwapur, Derapur Route. Bus is also available to Mangalpur via Derapur, Nonari & Dilval. Another bus stand at canal bridge, From where people may get bus to Sheoli, Kalyanpur & Kanpur, and other route to Billhaur via Jhinjhak, Rasulabad and another to Bilhaur via Banipara, Minda ka Kunwa.

Rura railway station is the primary railway station in the town on Howrah–Delhi main line. The station is under the administration of Udit Pandey and North Central railway zone. Kanpur Central is the nearest major railway station.

Following are the express trains stopping at Rura railway station:

1. Gomti Express
2. Unchahar Express
3. Sikkim Mahananda Express
4. Sangam Express (towards Meerut City)
5. Agra-Lucknow Intercity Express
6. Patna-Kota Express
7. Tatanagar/Sambalpur- Jammu Tawi Express

Following are the passenger trains stopping at Rura railway station:

1. Phaphund <=> Kanpur Central MEMU
2. Tundla <=> Kanpur Central MEMU
3. Etawah <=> Kanpur Central MEMU
4. Aligarh Jn. <=> Kanpur Central Fast MEMU

== Geography ==
Rura is located at 26.48°N 79.9°E. It has an average elevation of 127 metres (416 feet).

== Demographics ==
As of 2001 India census, Rura had a population of 35,206. Males constitute 53% of the population and females 47%. Rura has an average literacy rate of 70%, lower than the national average of 75%: male literacy is 75%, and female literacy is 65%. In Rura, 14% of the population is under 6 years of age.

== Gallery ==
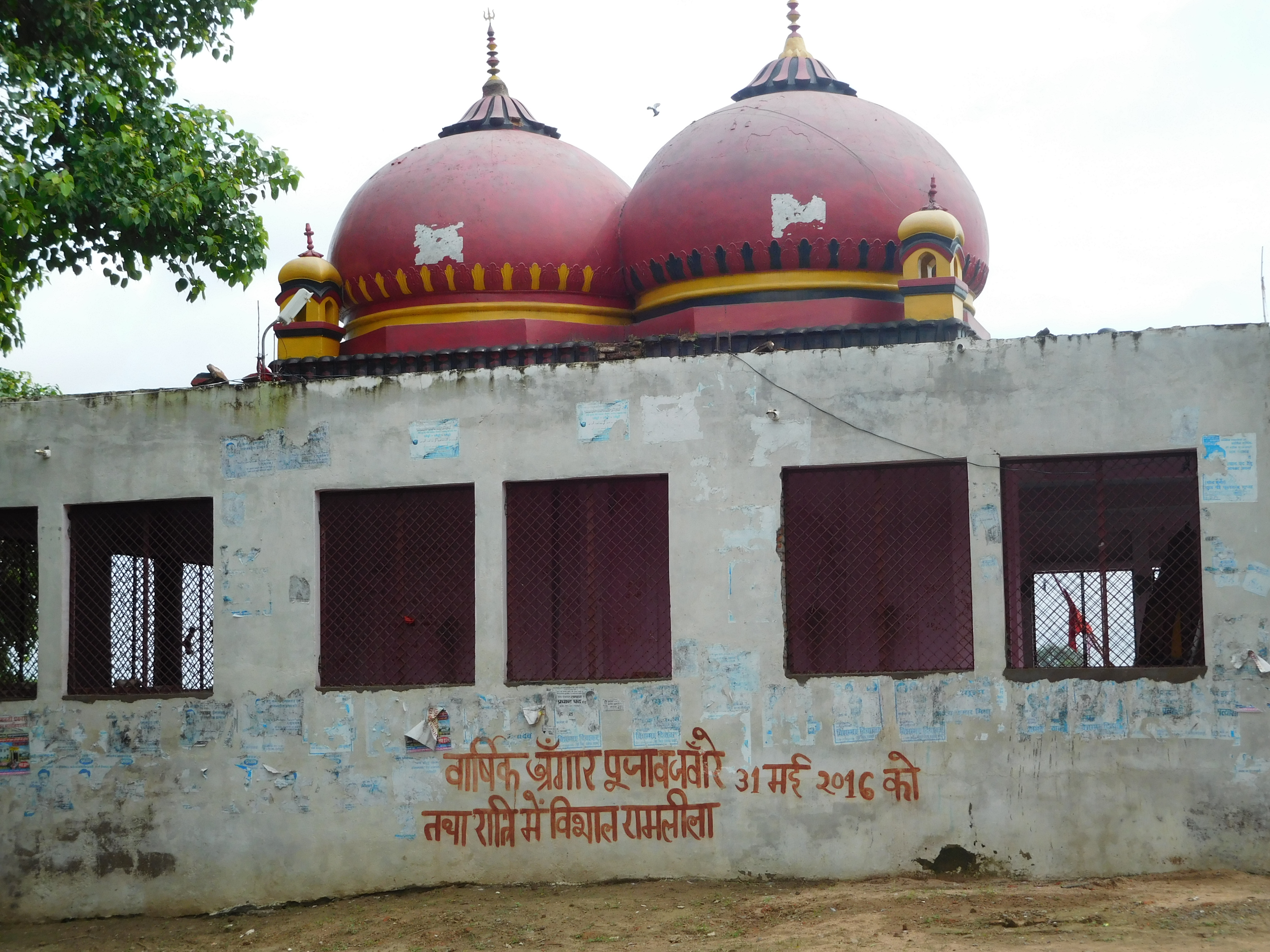
Parhul Devi Temple

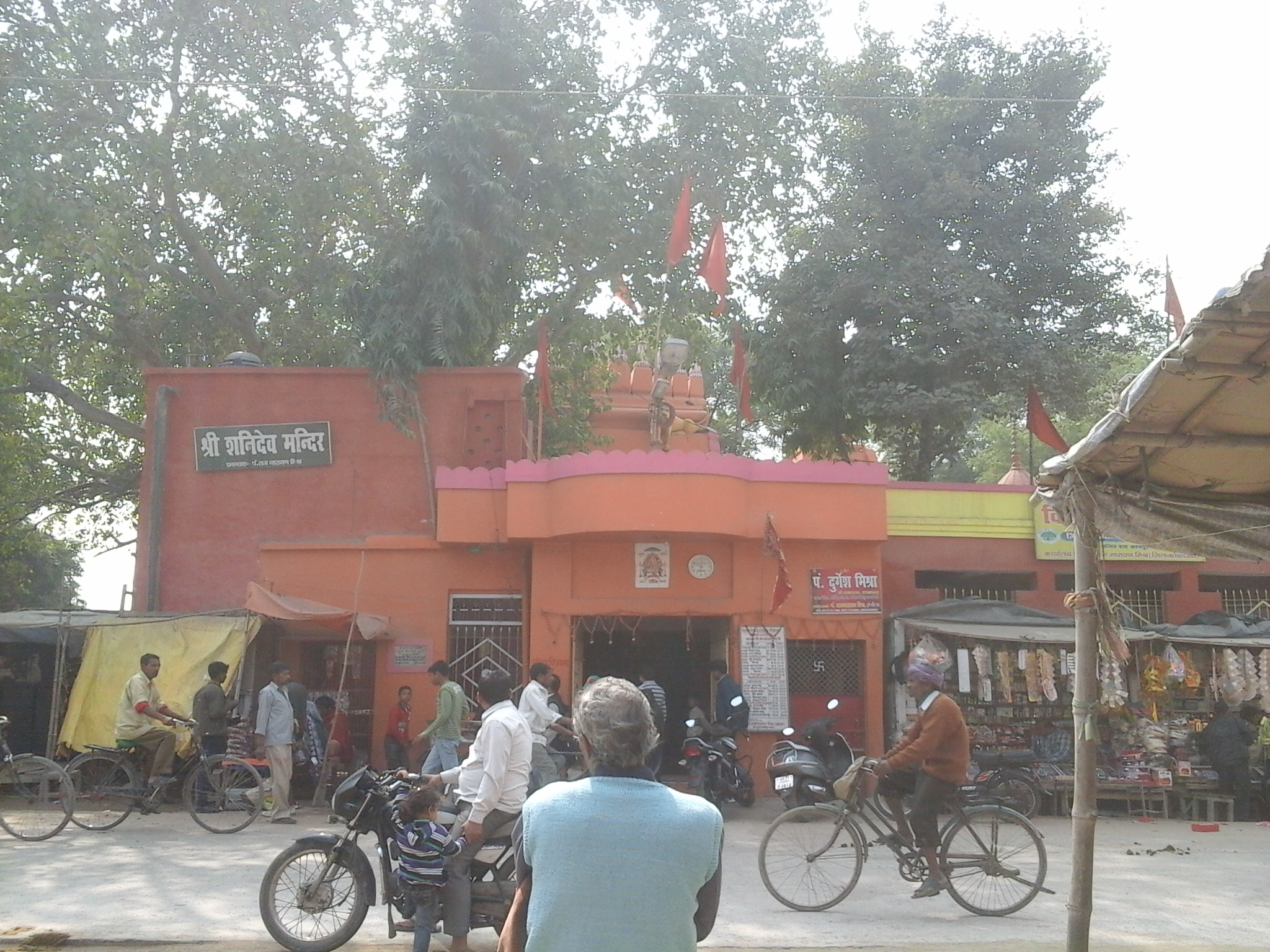
Durga Temple

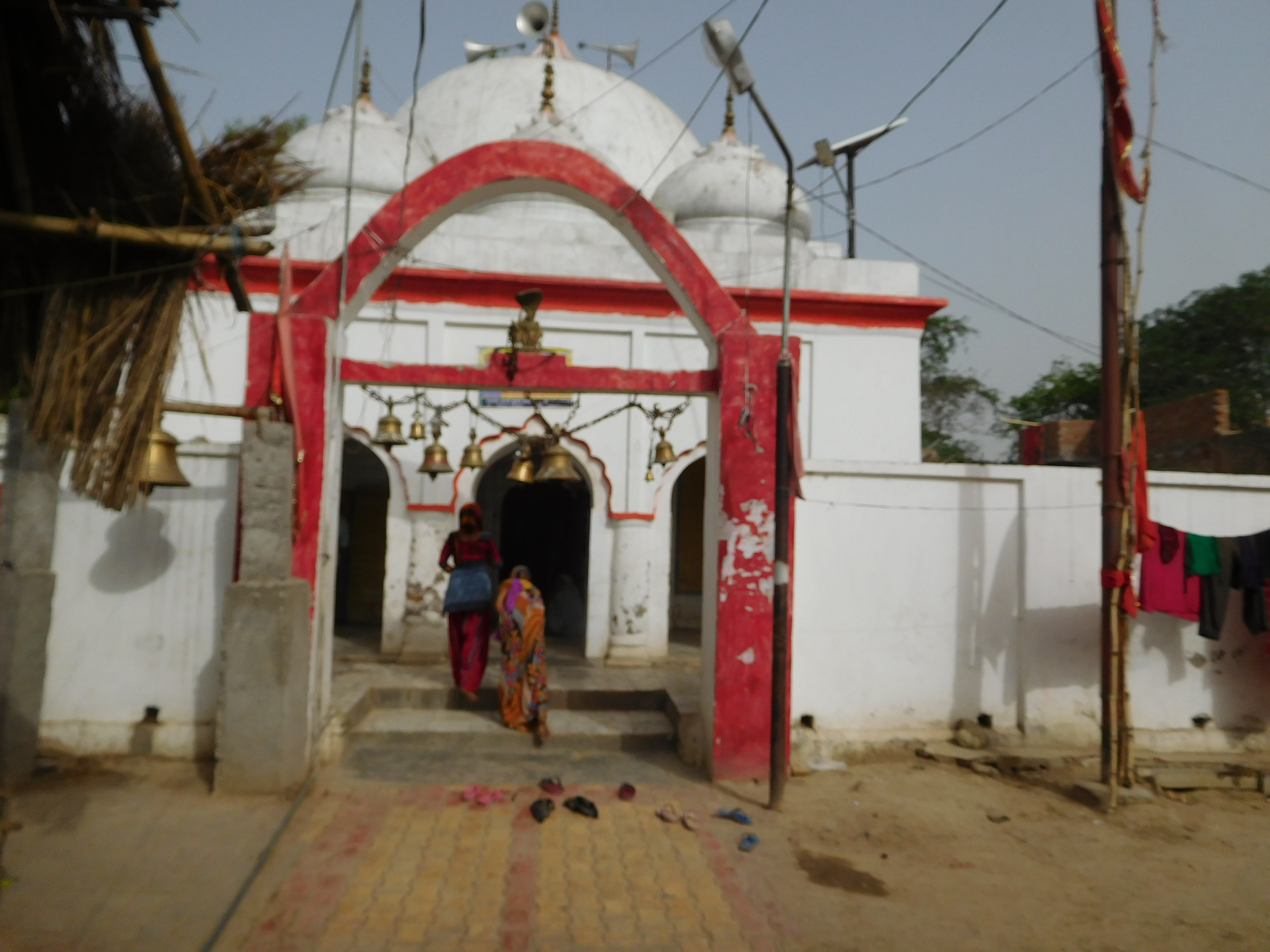
Waneshwar Mahadev Mandir

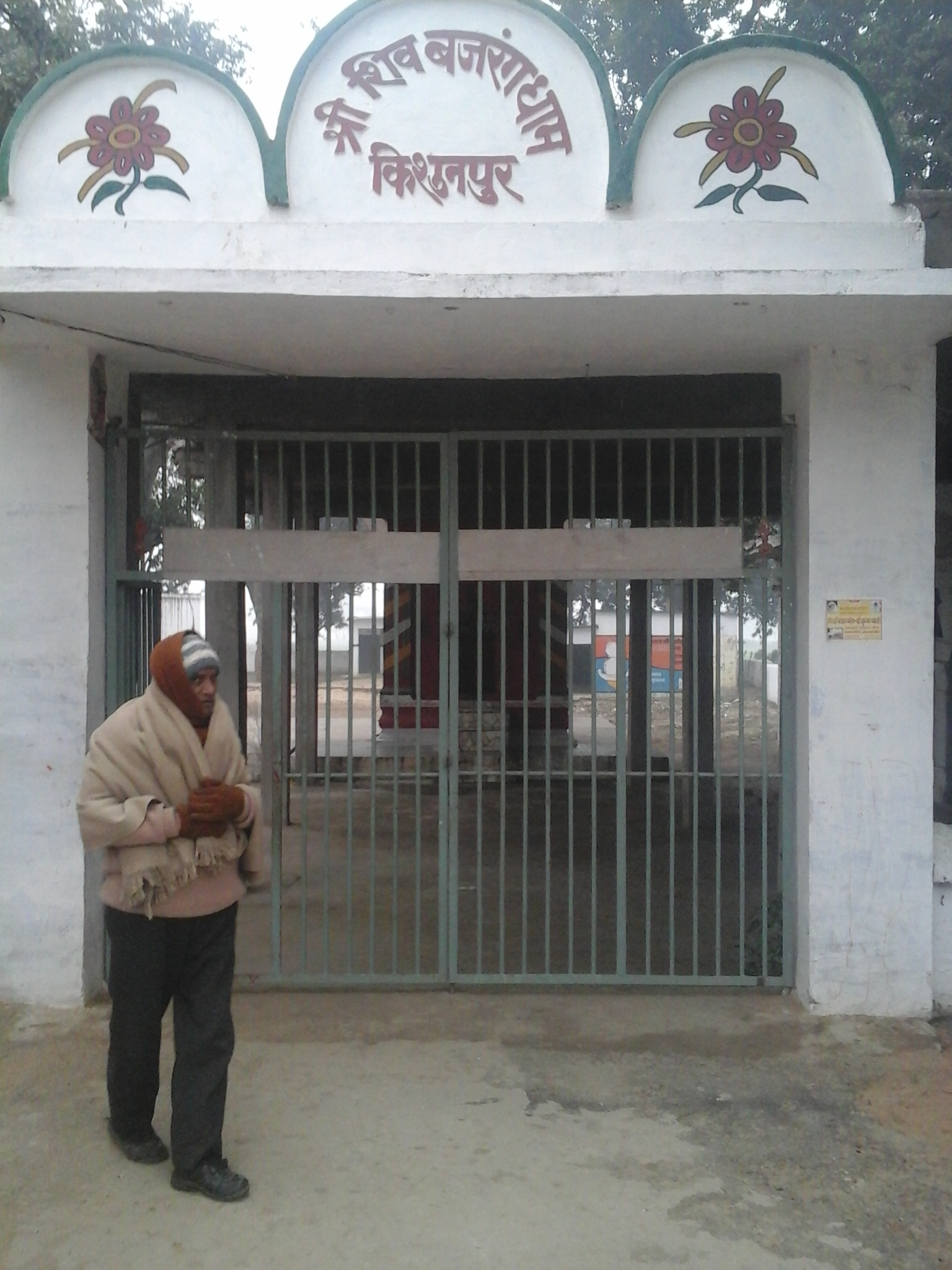
Shiv Bajrang Dham, Kishunpur

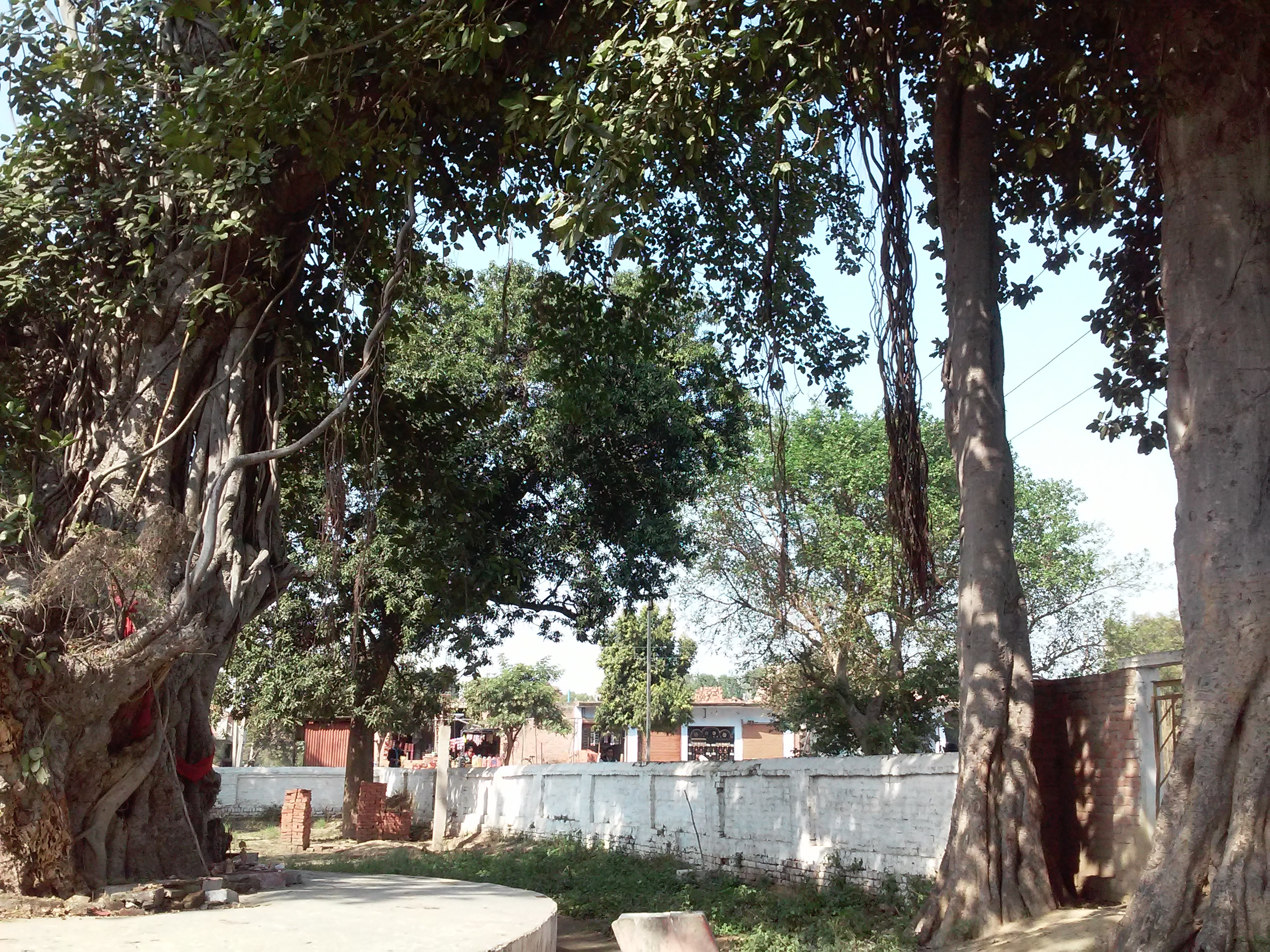
Banyan tree - Shiv Bajrang Dham, Kishunpur

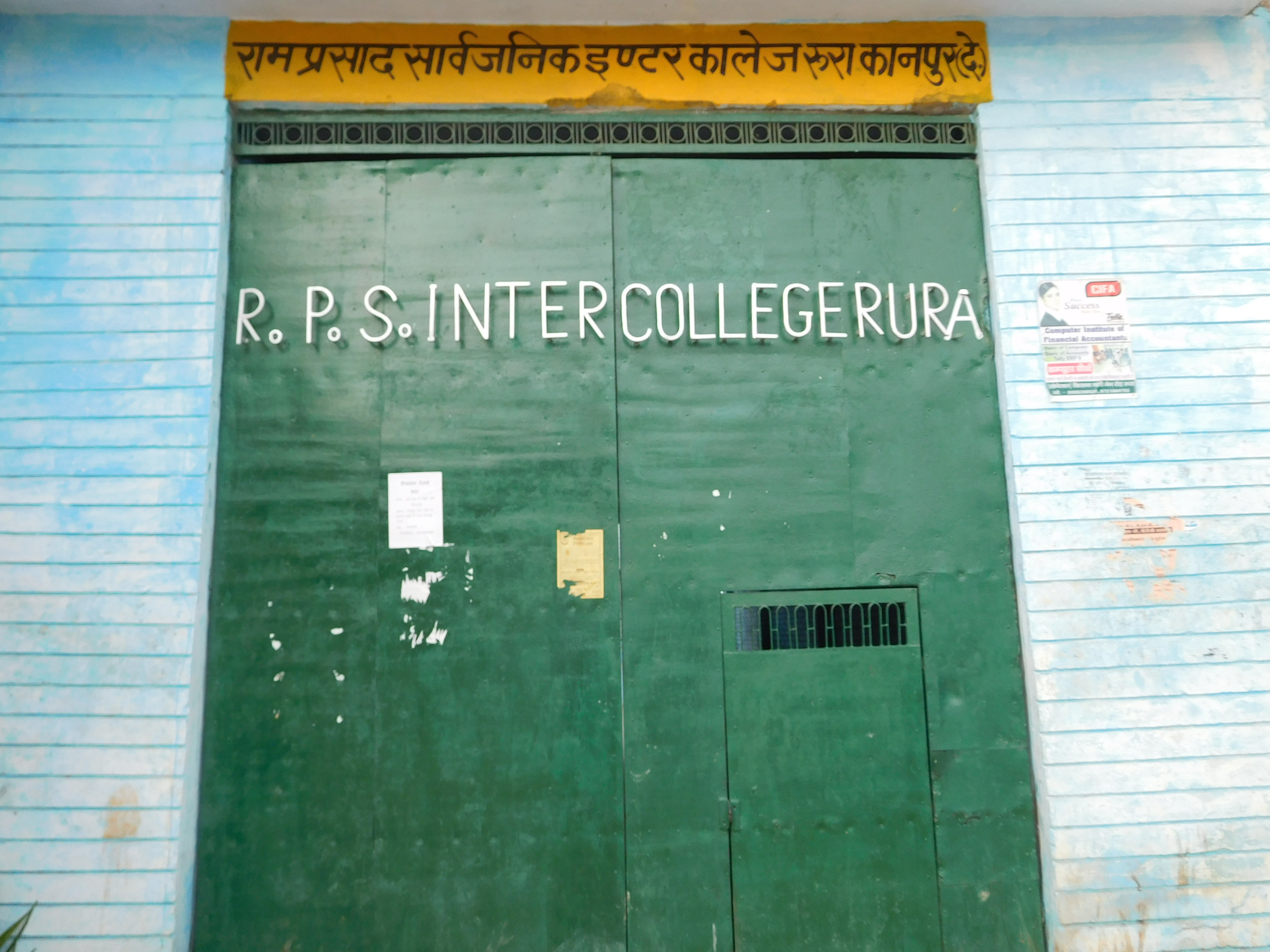
R. P. S. Inter College

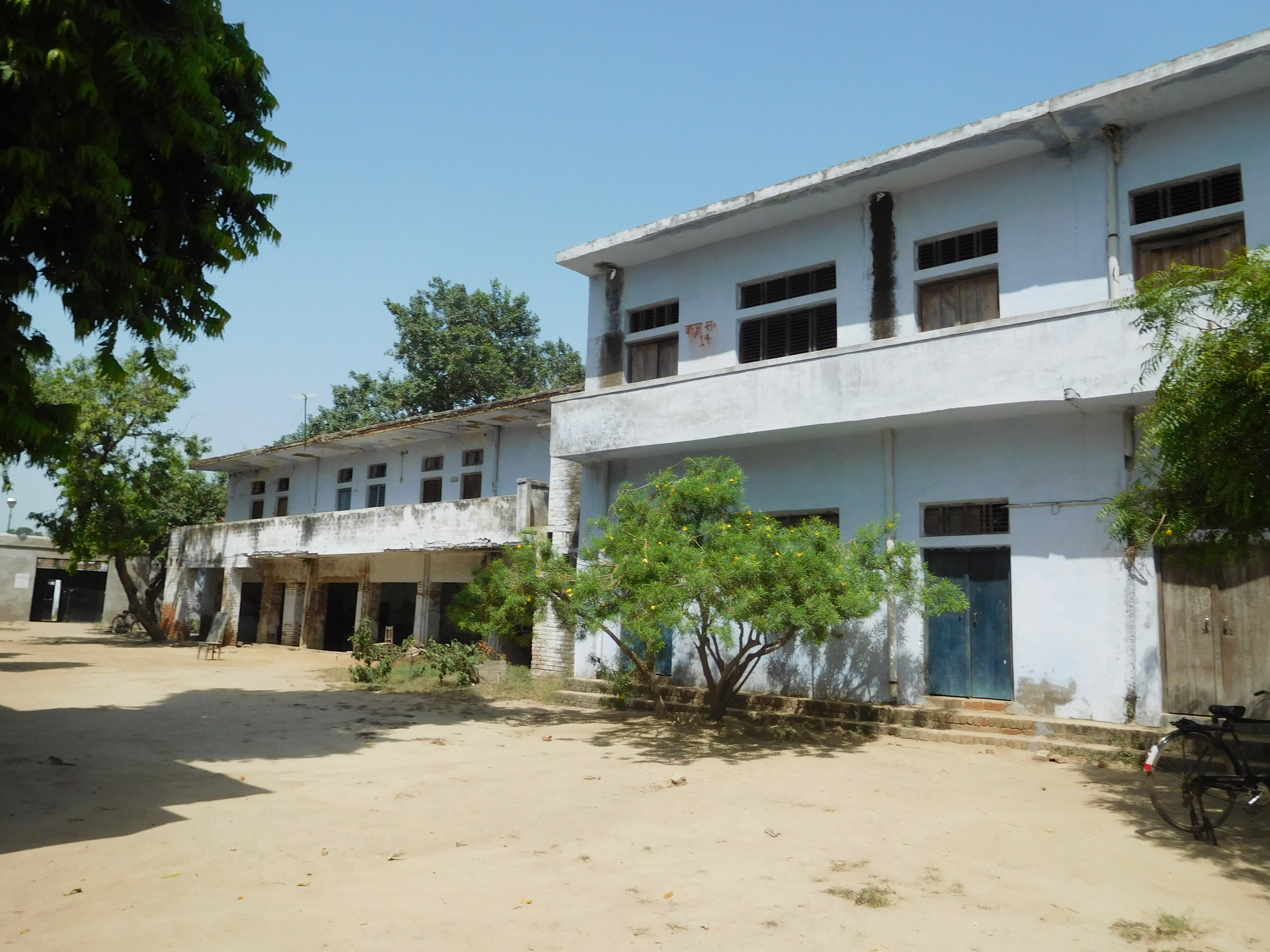
C. D. Girls Inter College

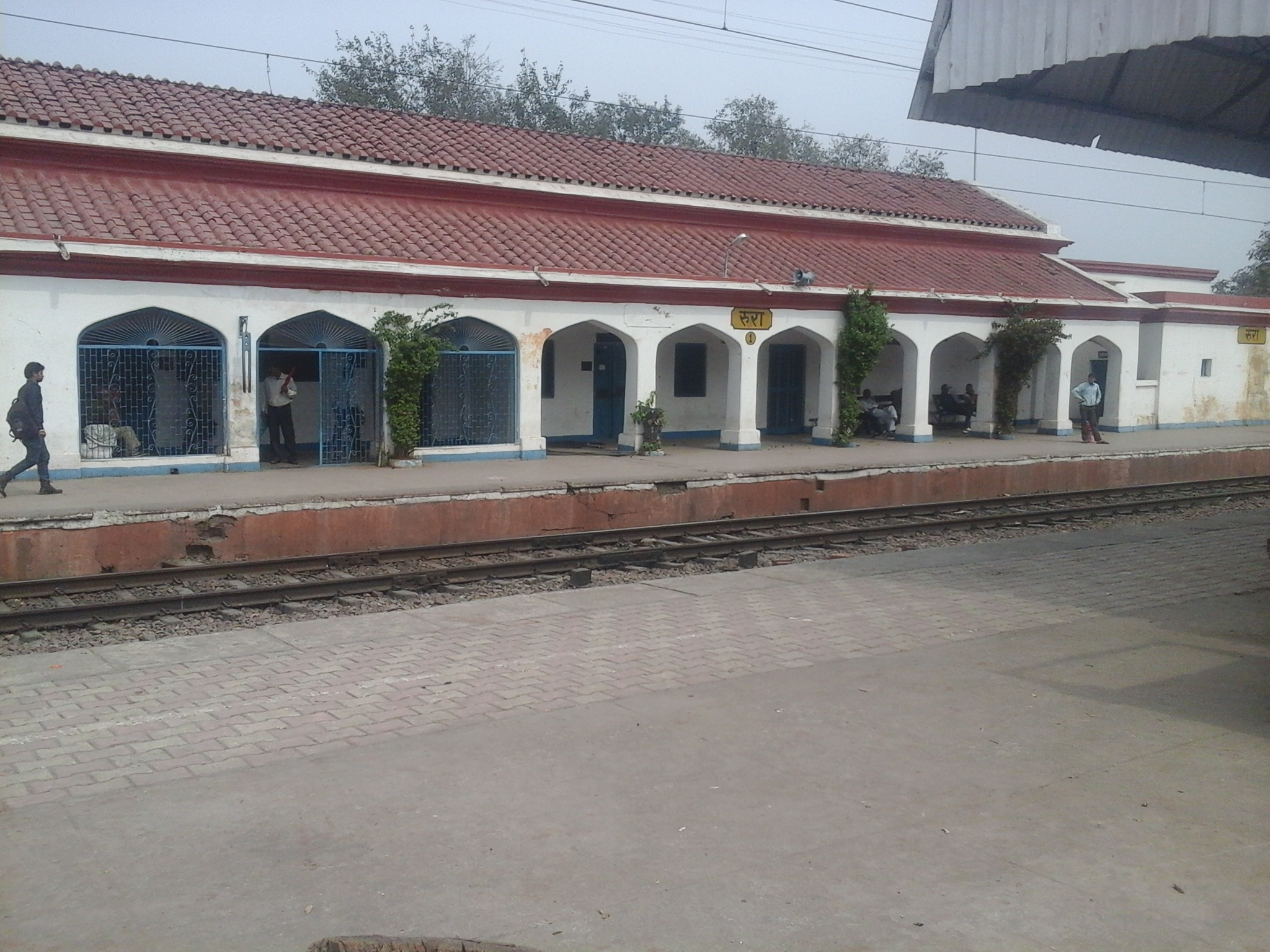
Rura Railway Station

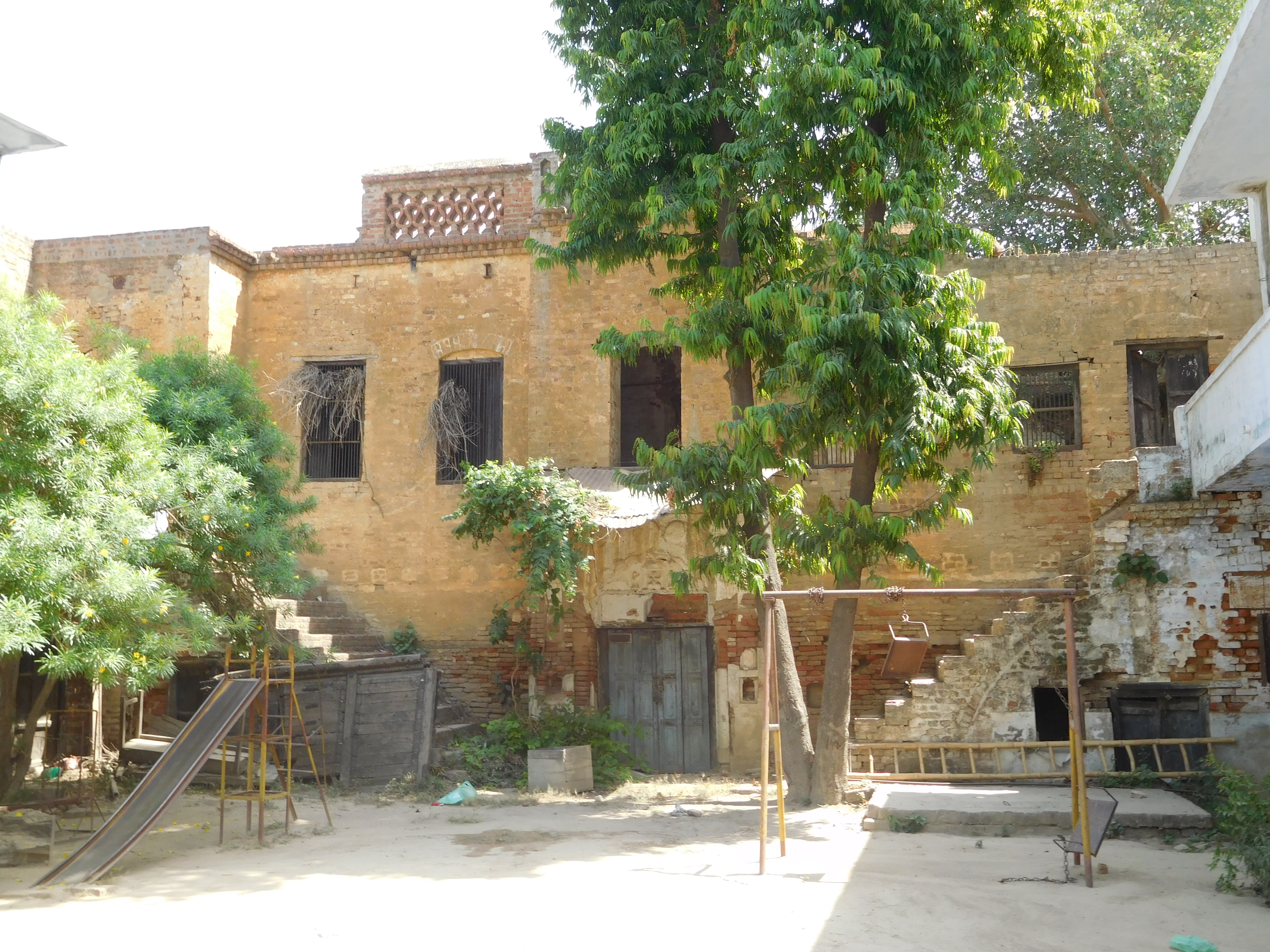
Home of Social Activist Babu Ram Prasad Shukla
