= Aruna Kori =

Indian politician

Minister of Women and Culture Development
- In office 15 March 2012 – 19 March 2017
- Constituency: Bilhaur, Kanpur

Personal details
- Born: 15 March 1973 (age 53) Kanpur, Uttar Pradesh, India
- Party: Bharatiya Janta Party (2023-Present); Pragatisheel Samajwadi Party (Lohiya) (2019-2022); Samajwadi Party (before 2019)
- Children: Vatsal chandra Annie Chandra
- Profession: Politician

Aruna Kori (born 15 March 1973) is an Indian politician and social worker. She represented Bilhaur constituency as MLA by Samajwadi Party. And she was also the Minister of Women Welfare and Culture of Government of Uttar Pradesh.

== Early life and education ==
A leader of Pragatisheel Samajwadi Party, Kori started her career at Samajwadi Party and she is the first woman to be Uttar Pradesh Minister of Women and Child development. She has been elected first time as a Member of legislative assembly from Bilhaur, Kanpur. She is Uttar Pradesh's youngest women minister. Two days before the voting of UP Nikay Chunav elections 2023, she left Samajwadi Party and joined BJP
