= Dharmpur =

Dharampur or Dharmpur may refer to:

== India ==
- Dharampur State, a Princely State now in Gujarat
- Dharampur, Gujarat, a city in Gujarat
- Dharampur, Solan, a village in Solan district, Himachal Pradesh
- Dharampur, Dahanu in Maharashtra
- Dharampur, Bulandshahr, a town in Uttar Pradesh
- Dharampur, Allahabad, village in Uttar Pradesh
- Dharampur, Bhara, Bishnupur, a village in West Bengal

== Nepal ==
- Dharampur, Jhapa
- Dharampur, Sagarmatha
- Dharampur, Narayani

== See also ==
- Dharampur Assembly constituency (disambiguation)
- Dharmapur (disambiguation)
- Dharmapuri (disambiguation)
- Dharampura, Punjab, Pakistan
- Dharampura, Aurangabad, Maharashtra, India
