= Bargujar (surname) =

Bargujar or Badgujar is a surname of Indian origin mostly found in Hindu Rajput caste. It is found among the Saltangar and Chhipa caste of northern India.

== Surname ==
- Shambhu Dayal Badgujar, Indian politicians
- Raj Kunwar Singh, was a noble landlord of Brauli Rao, Uttar Pradesh
- Anup singh Badgujar, courtier of Mughal emperor Jahangir
- Pratap Singh Badgujar, founder of Barauli Rao region in Aligarh, Uttar Pradesh
- Muhammad Ahmad Said Khan Chhatari, a Bargujar Nawab of Chhatari, Uttar Pradesh
