= Jignipurwa =

Coordinates: 26°20′13″N 80°07′49″E

Jignipurwa जिग्निपुरवा
- village
- Interactive map of Jignipurwa
- Country: India
- State: Uttar Pradesh
- District: Kanpur Dehat
- Elevation: 132 m (433 ft)

Population
  - Total: 927

Languages
  - Official: Hindi
- Time zone: UTC+5:30 (IST)
- Area code: 05115

Jignipurwa is a village near Sarwan Khera in Kanpur Dehat district, Uttar Pradesh, India. It is in Lohari gram panchayat and Akbarpur tehsil.

== About ==
Jignipurwa is 21 km to the east of district headquarters, Akbarpur. It is 4 km from Sarwan Khera.

Here a temple of god Shiva known as "Bada shiv mandir" and in Jignipurwa have many small temples of god Shiva. There have two primary junior high schools. Outside of village is a big pound known as "Bajar wala Talab". The market of Jignipurwa opens on Sundays and Thursday also.

== Cultural activities ==
The village is rich in cultural activities and youths of this village registered a society named as "Tejas Jan Samiti" for cultural, sports, educational and motivational purpose.
