= State Highway 10 (Rajasthan) =

Road in Rajasthan, India

State Highway 10

Route information
- Length: 315 km (196 mi)

Major junctions
- North-West end: Swaroopganj, Rajasthan
- South-East end: Ratlam, Madhya Pradesh

Location
- Country: India
- State: Rajasthan
- Districts: Rajasthan: Sirohi district, Udaipur district, Dungarpur district and Madhya Pradesh: Banswara district
- Primary destinations: Khapan, Royada, Kotada, Babalwara, Kherwara, Dungarpur, Sagwara, Garhi, Banswara, Danpur, Sarwan, Sailana

Highway system
- Roads in India; Expressways; National; State; Asian; State Highways in Rajasthan

State Highway 10 ( RJ SH 10) is a State Highway in Rajasthan state of India that connects Swaroopganj in Sirohi district of Rajasthan with Ratlam in Ratlam district of Madhya Pradesh. The total length of RJ SH 10 is 315 km.

This highway connects National Highway 14 in Swaroopganj to National Highway 79 in Ratlam. Other cities and towns on this highway are: Khapan, Royada, Kotada, Babalwara, Kherwara, Dungarpur, Sagwara, Garhi, Banswara, Danpur, Sarwan and Sailana.
