= Dharamkot =

Dharamkot may refer to the following places in India:

- Dharamkot, Moga, a city in Punjab
- Dharamkot, Himachal Pradesh, a hill station in Himachal Pradesh

== See also ==
- Dharmpur (disambiguation)
