= Dharmapuri (disambiguation) =

Dharmapuri is a city in Tamil Nadu, India.

Dharmapuri may also refer to:

- Dharmapuri in Tal.Ambajogai, Beed district, Maharashtra
- Dharmapuri, Telangana, city in Telangana
  - Dharmapuri, Telangana Assembly constituency
- Dharmapuri, Jagtial district, a village in Telangana
- Dharmapuri District, Tamil Nadu
  - Dharmapuri taluk, Tamil Nadu
  - Dharmapuri (Lok Sabha constituency)
  - Dharmapuri, Tamil Nadu Assembly constituency
- Roman Catholic Diocese of Dharmapuri
- Dharmapuri (film), a 2006 Indian Tamil film starring Vijayakanth
- Dharmapuri Arvind, a politician from Telangana
- Dharmapuri (Puducherry), a municipal ward in Puducherry district

== See also ==
- Dharmapur (disambiguation)
- Dharampur (disambiguation)
