= Raj Kunwar Singh =

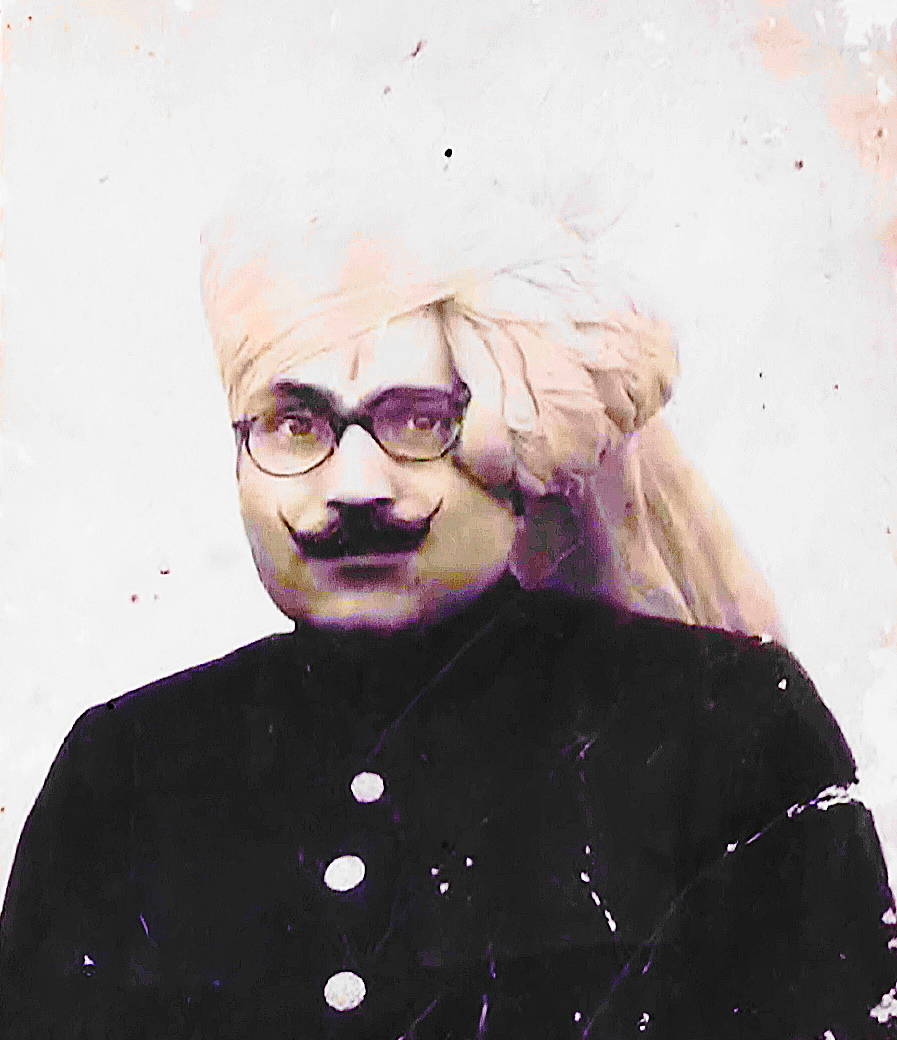
Rao Raj Kunwar Singh (1897-1968), the last Rao of Barauli.

Rao Raj Kunwar Singh (17 November 1897 – 1968) was a noted zamindar, known as Raja of Barauli Rao and member of legislative assembly in British India.

== Life sketch ==
=== Early life ===
He was adopted son of Rao Karan Singh, who was also the ruler of the Bajgarhi estate, Aligarh. His mother was daughter of Rao Karan Singh, Zamindar of Barauli Rao and was married to Rao Raghuraj Singh, who was also the ruler of the Bajgarhi estate. Karan Singh, who had no male issues had adopted him as his son.

=== Family history ===
The Taluka of Barauli was held by his family of Bargujar Rajputs who claimed to be the eldest branch of the clan settled in this area, and the other branch was settled in Bulandshahar district, who later converted to Islam. The estate was founded by the Raja Pratap Singh who had founded the town of Barauli in 1065, when there were 1656 villages attached to it, and got further 156 villages in dowry from Dor king of Kol. His father, Rao Karan Singh had won a suit in Privy Council, which established him as rightful inheritor of his ancestors several estates of around 400 villages. In January, 1913, the title of Rao for the Zamindars of Barauli was made hereditary by British authorities.

=== Rao of Barauli ===
Raj Kunwar did his schooling from Aligarh & later graduated from the Rajput College, Agra and became the Rao of Barauli upon death of Rao Karan Singh. He was a member of the district board and vice president of other committees. He was also a prominent member of Agra Province Zamindar's Association, for which he also served as a president. He was a Member of Legislative Council and also a member of Central Legislative Assembly as a representative of the Zamindars of Agra Province Zamindar's Association. He was last official Rao of Barauli as after independence of India, as the Zamindari was abolished in 1950.

=== Death ===
Kunwar Singh died in 1968.

=== Family ===
He had two wives Rani Laxmi Kunwar and Rani Phool Kunwar and had a son named Rao Madhusudan Singh.

== Gallery ==
Rao of Barauli

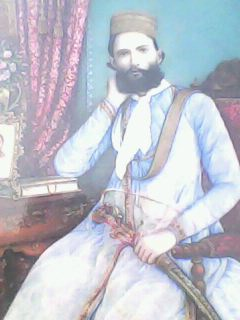
"Rao Karan Singh", father of Raj Kunwar Singh

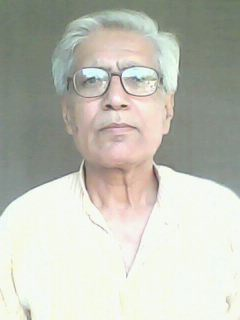
"Rap Madhusudan Singh", son of Rao Raj Kunwar Singh

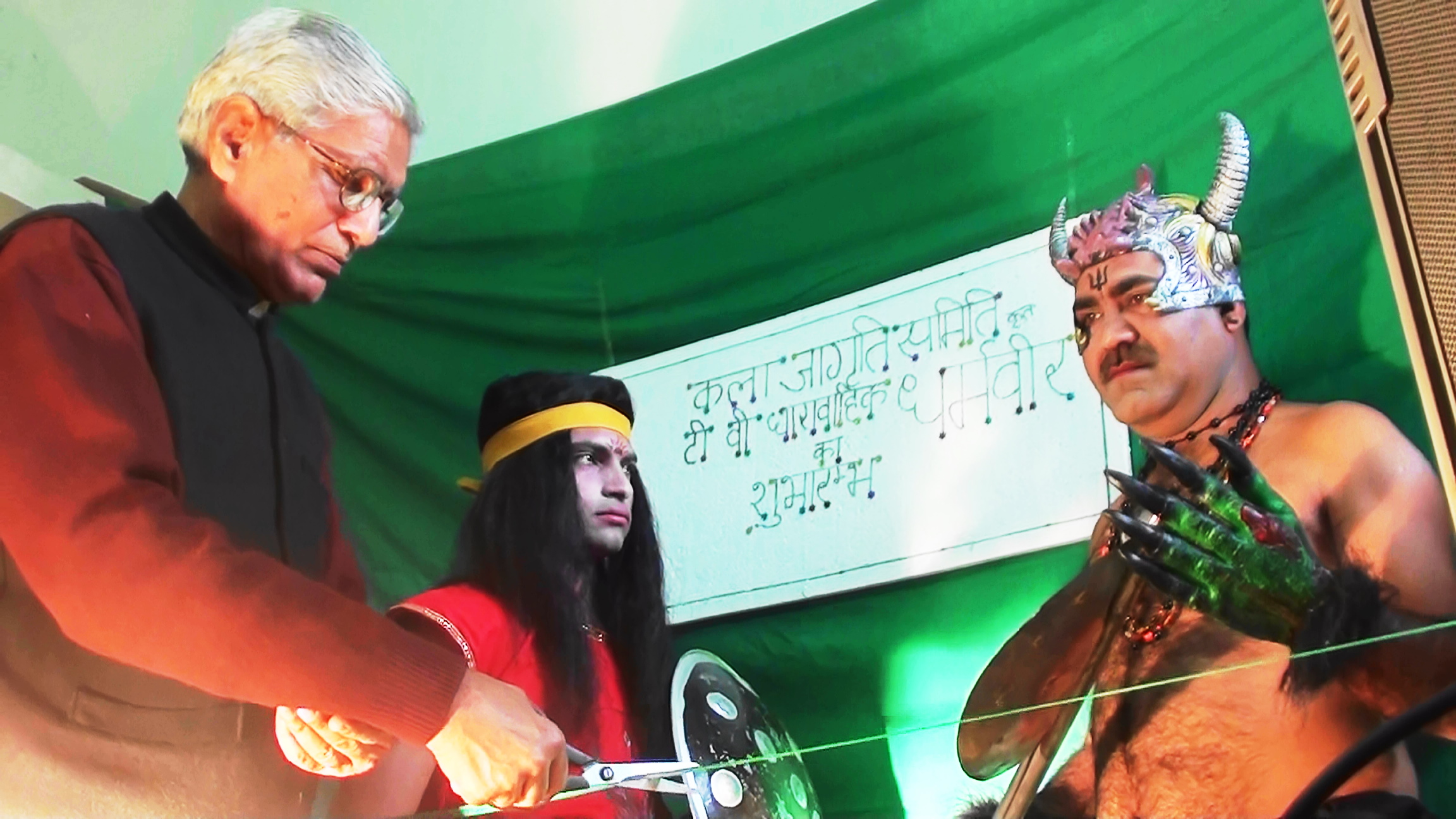
"Rao Madhusudan Singh" of Barauli is muharat of a "Jais Chauhan"'s TV serial "Dharamveer" at Aligarh.The Actors "Saihinsh Raghav"(middle) & 'Mohd. Kalim Khan'(left)
