= National Agriculturist Party =

- Abbreviation: NAP
- Leader: Muhammad Ahmad Said Khan Chhatari
- Founded: 1934; 92 years ago
- Headquarters: Agra and Oudh, British India
- Supported by: Zamindars, talukdars, landlord class, British government
- Seats in the 1937 United Provinces Legislative Assembly: 22
- Seats in Legislative Councils: 4

National Agriculturist Party (NAP) was a political party in the United Provinces (present-day Uttar Pradesh) of British India. The party won 22 seats in the 1937 United Provinces legislative assembly election and won four seats in legislative councils. Established in 1934 in both Agra and Oudh, the National Agriculturist Party initially existed primarily on paper. Until 1936, it relied on the personal influence of its members to maintain its presence. The party was formed with the support of zamindars and talukdars from both Hindu and Muslim communities, and it received backing from landlord class.

It comprised two factions, the National Agriculturist Party of Agra (NAPA) and the National Agriculturist Party of Oudh (NAPO). The National Agriculturist Party received backing from the British government. Initially supportive of British interests, these parties later played important roles in backing communal organisations within the province.

During the 1937 election, although the Indian National Congress won a majority of seats, they declined to form a government. Consequently, on 1 April 1937, the Muhammad Ahmad Said Khan Chhatari (the Nawab of Chhatari), the leader of the National Agriculturist Parties, was invited to form a minority provisional government.

== See also ==
- 1937 Indian provincial elections
