= Muhammad Ahmad Said Khan Chhatari =

Nawab of Chhatari

Lieutenant Colonel The Right Honourable Nawab Sir Muhammad Ahmad Said Khan GBE KCSI KCIE
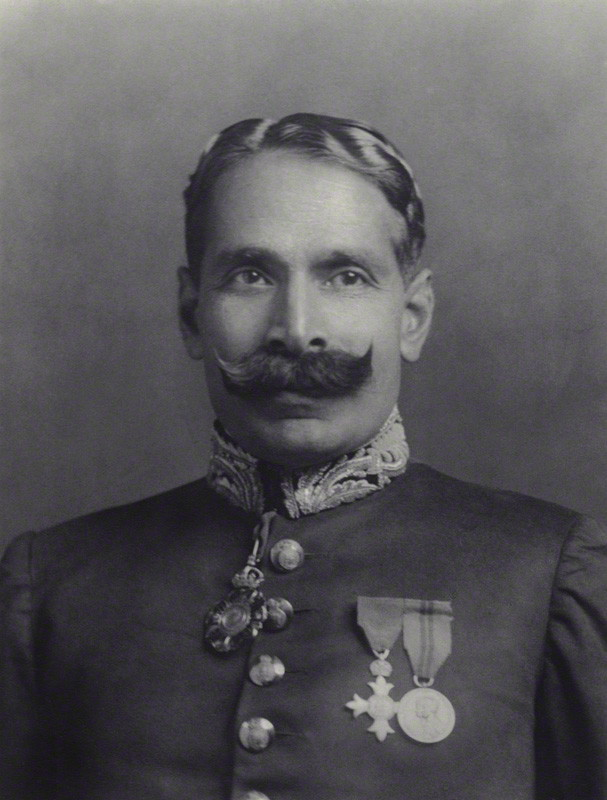
- Khan in 1930

Cabinet Minister of the United Provinces
- In office 17 May 1923 – 11 January 1926
- Preceded by: NA
- Succeeded by: NA

Acting Governor of the United Provinces
- In office 7 April 1933 – 26 November 1933
- Preceded by: Sir Alexander Phillips Muddiman
- Succeeded by: Sir William Malcolm Hailey

1st Chief Minister of United Provinces
- In office 3 April 1937 – 16 July 1937
- Preceded by: Office Established
- Succeeded by: Govind Ballabh Pant

Member of National Defence Council
- In office July 1941 – September 1941
- Preceded by: New creation
- Succeeded by: Vacated

President of the Executive Council of the Nizam of Hyderabad (i.e. Prime Minister of Hyderabad) (two terms)
- In office September 1941 – August 1946
- Preceded by: Sir Akbar Hydari
- Succeeded by: Mirza Ismail
- In office May 1947 – 1 November 1947
- Preceded by: Mirza Ismail
- Succeeded by: Sir Mehdi Yar Jung

Chief Scout of India
- In office 1955–1982
- Preceded by: New creation
- Succeeded by: Justice M. Hidayatullah

Personal details
- Born: 12 December 1888 Chhatari, North-Western Provinces, British India
- Died: 6 January 1982 (aged 93) Aligarh, Uttar Pradesh, India
- Party: Muslim League (National Agriculturist Parties)

Lieutenant Colonel Sir Muhammad Ahmad Said Khan, Nawab of Chhatari GBE KCSI KCIE also generally referred to as Nawab of Chhatari (12 December 1888 – 6 January 1982) was Governor of the United Provinces, Chief Minister of United Provinces, President of the Executive Council of the Nizam of Hyderabad (i.e. Prime Minister of Hyderabad) and Chief Scout of India.

== Early life and family ==
He was born in a Muslim Rajput Lalkhani family to Nawab Mohammad Abdul Ali Khan, the Nawab of Chhatari on 12 December 1888 in Chhatari, United Province of British India. He was educated at Muhammadan Anglo-Oriental College of Aligarh. He was married to a daughter of his uncle Nawab Abdul Samad Khan Bahadur, the Nawab of Talibnagar. He had two sons, Rahat Saeed Khan and Farhat Sayeed Khan. The younger son, Farhat Sayeed Khan, was noted for his interest in Hindustani classical music and he studied music at the Sangeet Research Academy at Calcutta. A part of the family moved to Pakistan shortly after the Partition of India, and the elder son (Rahat Saeed Chattari) became a senator in the Senate of Pakistan, the upper house of the nation's bicameral parliament. The Nawab, Muhammad Ahmad Said Khan of Chhatari, stayed in India and remained in public service until his death in 1982. His younger son, Farhat Sayeed Khan worked in India, and rose to be the Sales Director of Tata Iron and Steel Co. Ltd.

== Council to Government ==
From 17 May 1923 to 11 January 1926, the Nawab was a Minister in the Cabinet of the United Provinces, then in 1931 he returned as Minister of Agriculture there. Like other great Muslim zamindars, including the Raja of Salempur, he was a trusted ally of the British administration of the United Provinces and was appointed acting Governor for some seven months, from April to November 1933. The Government of India Act 1935, formulated after a series of round table conferences, came into effect on 1 April 1937, and the Nawab of Chhatari, as leader of the National Agriculturist Parties, was invited to form a cabinet, and was briefly chief minister in 1937. He soon stepped down to become Minister of Home Affairs in the United Provinces Government, with a salary of Rs. 2,500.

Nawab Chhatari attended the first Round Table Conference, held at St. James's Palace in London on 12 November 1930. The Muslim Delegation was led by the Aga Khan and others, including Muhammad Ali Jinnah, Sir Mohammad Shafi, Maulana Muhammad Ali, Dr Shafat Ali, Sir Muhammad Zafarullah Khan, the Nawab of Chhatari, and A. K. Fazlul Huq.

The Nawab of Chhatari was a member of the India National Defence Council from July to August 1941. He resigned from this to accept the post of President of the Hyderabad Executive Council, effectively Prime Minister of the important princely state of Hyderabad.

== Disquiet with Jinnah ==
The Nawab of Chhatari attended the third open session of the All-India Muslim League, held in the Pandal at Lalbagh, Lucknow, on Sunday, 17 October 1936, with Jinnah presiding. The meeting was also attended by Maulana Shaukat Ali, Moulana Hasrat Mohani, Maulana Zafar Ali Khan, Dr Syed Husain, Raja Gazanfar Ali Khan, Khan Bahadur Kuli Khan, Fazlul Huq, Nawab Jamshed Ali Khan, and others.

== Prime Minister of Hyderabad ==
Nawab of Chhatari was appointed President of the Executive Council of the Nizam of Hyderabad (i.e. Prime Minister of Hyderabad) in August 1941. He served on this post from September 1941 to 1 November 1947.

On 6 September 1941, the Nizam of Hyderabad, praised Nawab of Chhatari as an able administrator.

On 25 November 1945, the Nawab of Chhatari laid the foundation stone of the Institution of Engineers (India), A.P. State Center (Visvesvarayya Bhavan).

In 1946, the Nizam of Hyderabad suggested to the Viceroy of India that the Nawab of Chhatari should be appointed Governor of the Central Provinces and Berar.

=== Chhatari delegation ===
On 11 July 1947, after the Nizam had seen the pending Indian Independence Bill, which did not offer the possibility of Dominion status to any of the princely states, an option he had pressed for, he decided to send a delegation to Delhi headed by the Nawab of Chhatari to meet the Viceroy, Lord Mountbatten of Burma. On 17 August 1947, the Nawab wrote to Mountbatten expressing the wish to enter into negotiations on the future of Hyderabad State.

In August 1947, Sir Walter Monckton, a constitutional advisor to the Nizam and the Nawab of Chhatari, tendered his resignation to the Nizam, prompted by an attack by Razakars and Ittehad-ul-Muslimeen, but the attempted resignation was not accepted.

On 27 October 1947, Razakars and Ittehad-ul-Muslimeen staged a demonstration at the houses of the members of the delegation, Monckton, the Nawab, and Sir Sultan Ahmed, making it impossible for them to leave for Delhi as intended. The discussions that followed bore no fruit, and on 1 November the Nawab of Chhatari, finding his position intolerable, resigned as President of the Executive Council. Monckton also insisted on resigning.

On 21 December 1947, Mahatma Gandhi held talks with the Nawab of Chhatari, H. S. Suhrawardy, Brijlal Nehru, Rameshwari Nehru, Sheikh Abdullah, Begum Abdullah, Dr. Saifuddin Kitchlew, Bakshi Ghulam Mohammad, the Prince of Kutch, the Maharaja of Bhavnagar, Anantrai Pattani and others.

In a radio speech on 23 September 1948, the Nizam said "In November last, a small group which had organized a quasi-military organization surrounded the homes of my Prime Minister, the Nawab of Chhatari, in whose wisdom I had complete confidence, and of Sir Walter Monckton, my constitutional Adviser, by duress compelled the Nawab and other trusted ministers to resign, and forced the Laik Ali Ministry on me. This group headed by Kasim Razvi had no stake in the country or any record of service behind it. By methods reminiscent of Hitlerite Germany it took possession of the State, spread terror ... and rendered me completely helpless."

== Recognition ==
As a personal distinction, Muhammad Ahmad Said Khan was created "Nawab of Chhatari" in the 1915 Birthday Honours list for India. He was further honoured as a Member of the Order of the British Empire (MBE) in the 1918 Birthday Honours, and as a Companion of the Order of the Indian Empire (CIE) in the 1921 Birthday Honours. He was knighted as a Knight Commander of the Order of the Indian Empire (KCIE) in the 1928 Birthday Honours, awarded a second knighthood as a Knight Commander of the Order of the Star of India (KCSI) in the 1933 New Year Honours and received a final knighthood in the 1946 Birthday Honours as a Knight Grand Cross of the Order of the British Empire (GBE). In 1944, he was granted the title of Saeed-ul-Mulk by the Nizam of Hyderabad.

== Public life ==
He served as Chancellor of Aligarh Muslim University from December 1965 to 6 January 1982 and as Chief Scout of the All India Boy Scouts Association from 1955 to 1982.

== Time line ==
Government offices
Preceded by NA	Cabinet Minister of the United Provinces; 17 May 1923 – 11 January 1926	Succeeded by NA
Preceded by Sir Alexander Phillips Muddiman	Acting Governor of the United Provinces; 7 April 1933 – 26 November 1933	Succeeded by Sir William Malcolm Hailey
Political offices
Preceded by New creation	Chief Minister of United Provinces; 3 April 1937 – 16 July 1937	Succeeded by Govind Ballabh Pant
Government offices
Preceded by New creation	Member of the National Defence Council; July 1941 – September 1941	Succeeded by vacated
Preceded by Sir Akbar Hydari	President of the Executive Council of the Nizam of Hyderabad (i.e. Prime Minister of Hyderabad) (first time); September 1941 – August 1946	Succeeded by Mirza Ismail
Preceded by Mirza Ismail	President of the Executive Council of the Nizam of Hyderabad (i.e. Prime Minister of Hyderabad) (second time); May 1947 – November 1947	Succeeded by Mehdi Yar Jung
Scouting
Preceded by New creation	Chief Scout of India; 1955–1982	Succeeded by Justice M. Hidayatullah

== Autobiography ==
- Yad-e-Ayyam (1949) is the autobiography of Nawab of Chhatari Muhammad Ahmad Said Khan. In this book, the writer has given glimpses of his life and experiences in a direct and artless manner.

== See also ==
- Lalkhani
- List of governors of the United Provinces
