= Barauli Rao =

- Town
- Location in Uttar Pradesh, India Barauli Rao (India)
- Coordinates: 27°55′43″N 78°24′37″E
- Country: India
- State: Uttar Pradesh
- District: Aligarh

Population
  - Total: 50,000

Language
  - Official: Hindi
  - Additional official: Urdu
- Time zone: UTC+5:30 (IST)
- PIN: 202126
- Telephone code: 248
- Lok Sabha constituency: Aligarh

Barauli Rao is a town, panchayat block and Vidhansabha constituency in Aligarh district in the Indian state of Uttar Pradesh.

== Geography ==
It is situated 25 km from Aligarh city, 15 km from Qasimpur Power House Colony and 20 km distance from Harduaganj Thermal Power Station. Barauli Rao is located on the west side of Aligarh.

== History ==
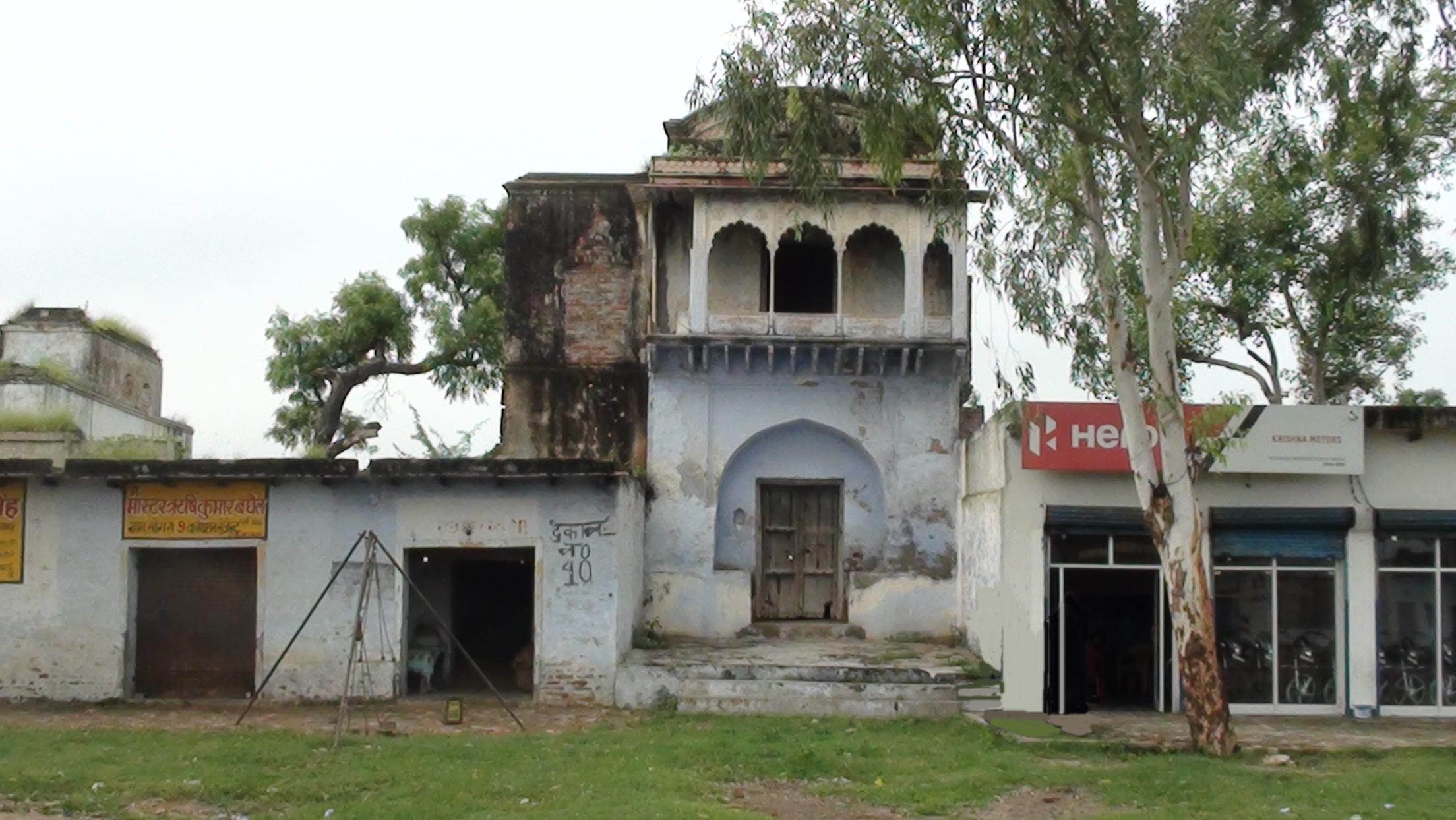
Barauli Fort's main gate

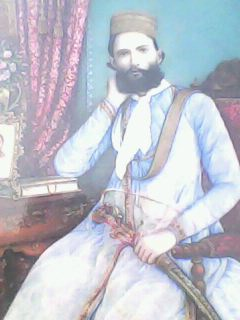
Rao Karan Singh of Barauli estate

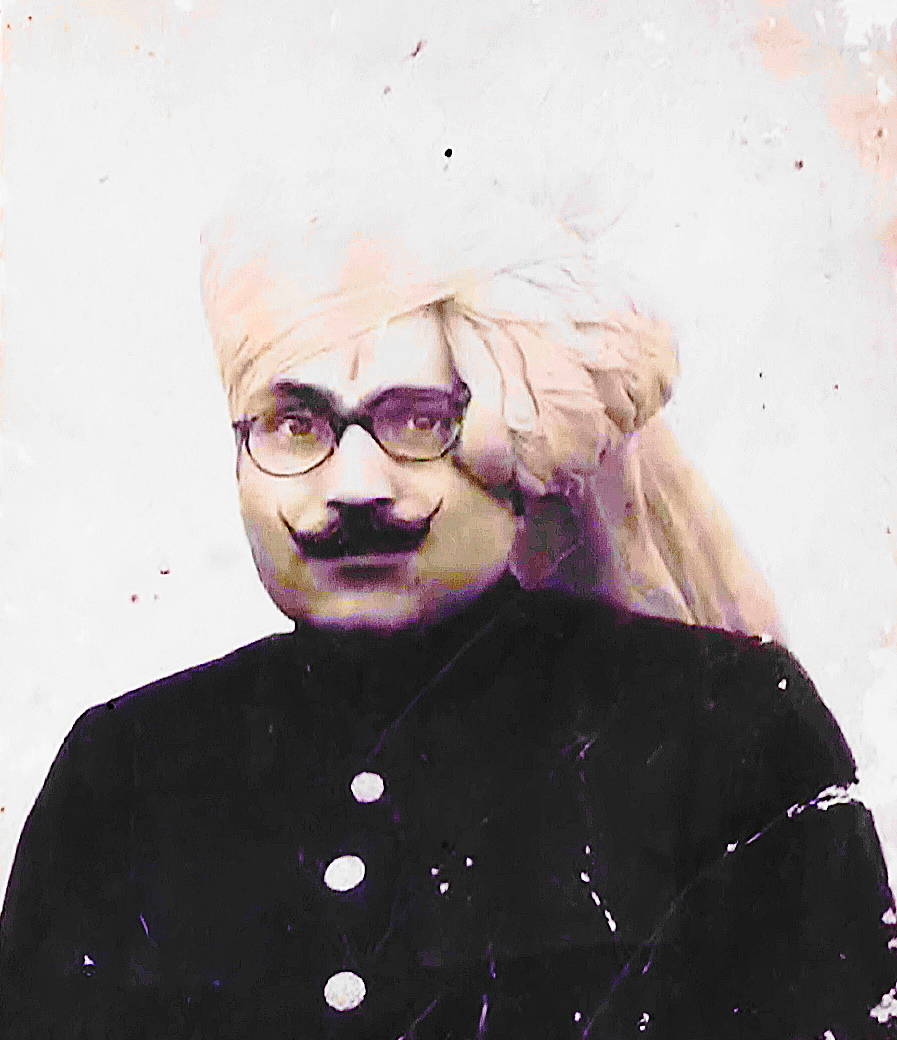
Rao Rajkumar Singh of Barauli estate

Barauli was a jagir during British India.

The title of Rao was first used by Raja Pratap Singh, the founder king of Barauli state. Bargujar Rajput's Bajgarhi state at the time of Raja Pirthi Raj and was prefixed to the name of the eldest son Rao Raja Raghuraj Singh. In 1931 title of Rao of Barauli was made hereditary by British.

- Rao Karan Singh had adopted his grandson (Raj Kunwar), who was his daughter's and Rao Raghuraj Singh's son, the ruler of Bajgarhi estate, Aligarh.
- Rao Raj Kunwar Singh, M.L.A., the last Zamindar of Barauli Estate

== Demographics ==
As of 2001 India census, Barauli Rao had a population of 5,000. Males constitute 70% of the population and females 30%. Barauli Rao has an average literacy rate of 20%. 15% of the population is under 6 years of age.

== Services ==
Barauli Rao has 3 bank, Gramin Bank Punjab National Bank and the State Bank of India.

== See also ==
- Barauli, Uttar Pradesh (Vidhan Sabha constituency)
- Lalkhani
