= Danpur =

Coordinates: 28.194°N 78.206°E

Danpur is a town in Danpur Mandal in Bulandshahr District in Uttar Pradesh, India.

Nearby towns are Dibai (8.6 km), Pahasu (15.2 km), Anupshahr (18.2 km)

== History ==
Danpur was a jagir during British India, owned by Lalkhani Badgujar Muslim Rajput community.

Danpur has several High Schools and couple of Colleges.
