= Talib Nagar =

Talib Nagar is a village in Jawan Sikandarpur Block, Aligarh District of Uttar Pradesh, India.

It is located at a distance of 15.6 km from Aligarh.

== History ==
Talib Nagar was a jagir during British India. It was owned by Nawabs belonging to the dynasty of Lalkhani Badgujar, a Muslim Rajput community, styled as Nawab of Talibnagar.

=== Nawabs of Talib Nagar ===
- Kunwar Mohamed Lutaf Ali Khan Sahib
- Nawab Abdul Samad Khan(1861-1943)
- Kunwar Abdul Sami Khan

== Present status ==
The village has a couple of junior and high schools.
