= Dharmapur =

Dharmapur may refer to:

- Another name of Ayodhya, as the city of law
- Dharmapur, West Bengal, India
- Dharmapur, Nepal
- Dharmapur, Satkania Upazila, Chittagong, Bangladesh
- Dharmapur (Vidhan Sabha constituency), Assam Legislative Assembly, India

== See also ==
- Dharmpur (disambiguation)
- Dharmapuri (disambiguation)
- Dharampur, Gujarat Assembly constituency
- Dharampur, Himachal Pradesh Assembly constituency
