= Abdul Samad Khan =

Nawab Abdul Samad Khan Nawab Bahadur, Nawab of Talib Nagar and Nawab of Chhatari

Personal details
- Born: 7 September 1861 Talib Nagar, Aligarh, North-Western Provinces
- Died: 1943 Talib Nagar, Aligarh North-Western Provinces
- Party: Old Party faction of Muslim League

Nawab Abdul Samad Khan Bahadur (1861–1943) was the Nawab of Chhatari and Nawab of Talibnagar in the United Provinces of Agra and Oudh. He belonged to the Lalkhani family of Muslim Rajputs.

== Early life ==
He was selected as trustee of the Old Party in Aligarh in 1909. He was nominated leading member of the Zamindars of the Province of Agra in 1917, the Chairman of Aligarh District Munincipal Board and a Special Magistrate with 2nd class powers in Tehsil Koil, Aligarh. He was also one of the trustees of Muhammadan Anglo-Oriental College of Aligarh.

The Nawab had one son, Nawab Abdul Sami Khan, and 3 daughters. He gave his daughters in marriage to his nephew Muhammad Ahmad Said Khan Chhatari and thus he is the ancestor of future Nawabs of Chhatari also.

== Titles ==
- Khan Bahadur
- 1913-22: Nawab of Talib Nagar, Nawab of Chhatri
