= Akbarpur, Kanpur Dehat =

Akbarpur
- Town
- Location in Uttar Pradesh, India
- Coordinates: 26.379°N 79.951°E
- Country: India
- State: Uttar Pradesh
- District: Kanpur Dehat

Population (2011)
  - Total: 20,445

Languages
  - Official: Hindi
- Time zone: UTC+5:30 (IST)
- Postal code: 209101
- Vehicle registration: UP-77

Akbarpur is a town located in the Kanpur Dehat district in the state of Uttar Pradesh, India.

== Demographics ==
Historical population
| Year | Pop. | ±% |
|---|---|---|
| 1900 | 1,150 | — |
| 1910 | 1,176 | +2.3% |
| 1920 | 1,321 | +12.3% |
| 1930 | 1,982 | +50.0% |
| 1940 | 1,457 | −26.5% |
| 1950 | 2,836 | +94.6% |
| 1960 | 7,394 | +160.7% |
| 1970 | 14,836 | +100.6% |
| 1980 | 15,025 | +1.3% |
| 1990 | 16,374 | +9.0% |
| 2000 | 16,841 | +2.9% |
| 2001 | 17,368 | +3.1% |
| 2011 | 20,445 | +17.7% |
* = population estimate. "Basic Population Figures of India, States, Districts, Sub-District and Town (Without Ward), 2011". Census Commission of India. Archived from the original on 18 December 2024.

As per the 2011 Census of India, Akbarpur had a population of 20,455. Males constituted 53% (10,836) of the population, while females made up 47% (9,609). The average literacy rate in Akbarpur was 66%, which was lower than the national average of 74%. Male literacy was recorded at 69% (7,530), while female literacy stood at 61% (5,877). Children under 6 years of age comprised 13% of the population.

== Connectivity ==
=== Railways ===
Akbarpur does not have a railway station of its own but is connected through Rura Railway Station (NCR).

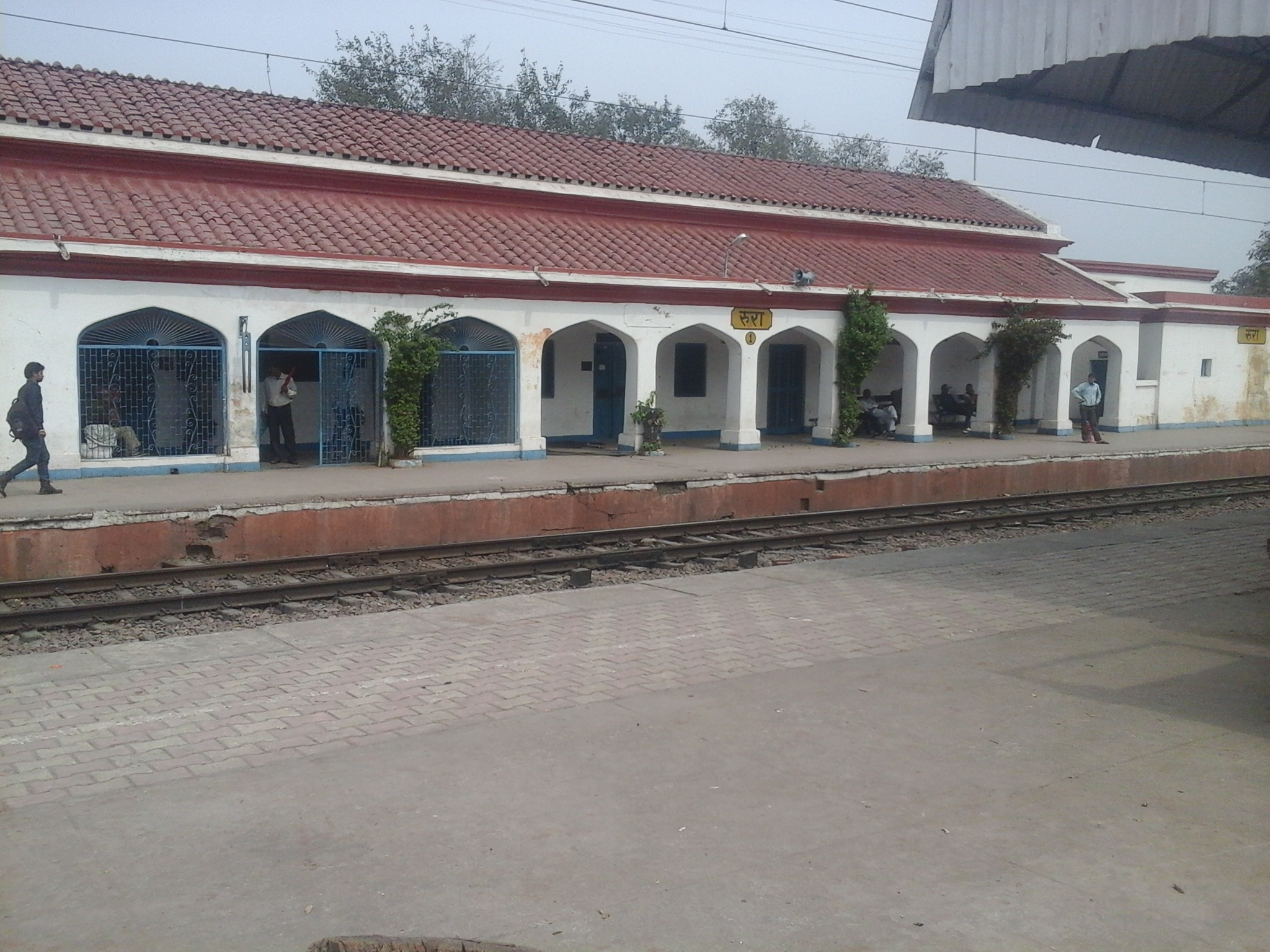
Rura Railway Station

Rura is a major railway station serving Akbarpur in the Kanpur Dehat district. It is well-connected by express and superfast trains to major cities, including Delhi, Howrah, Lucknow, Agra, Patna, Meerut, and Jammu.

=== Airways ===
The nearest airport is Kanpur Airport, which provides connectivity to major cities.

=== Roadways ===
The Golden Quadrilateral (National Highway 19) passes through Akbarpur in the Kanpur Dehat district, providing connectivity to major cities across India. Additionally, the Lucknow–Jhansi National Highway also passes through the region. AC, non-AC, and sleeper buses are available for travel to various cities in India.

== Educational institutions ==
1. Akbarpur Inter College
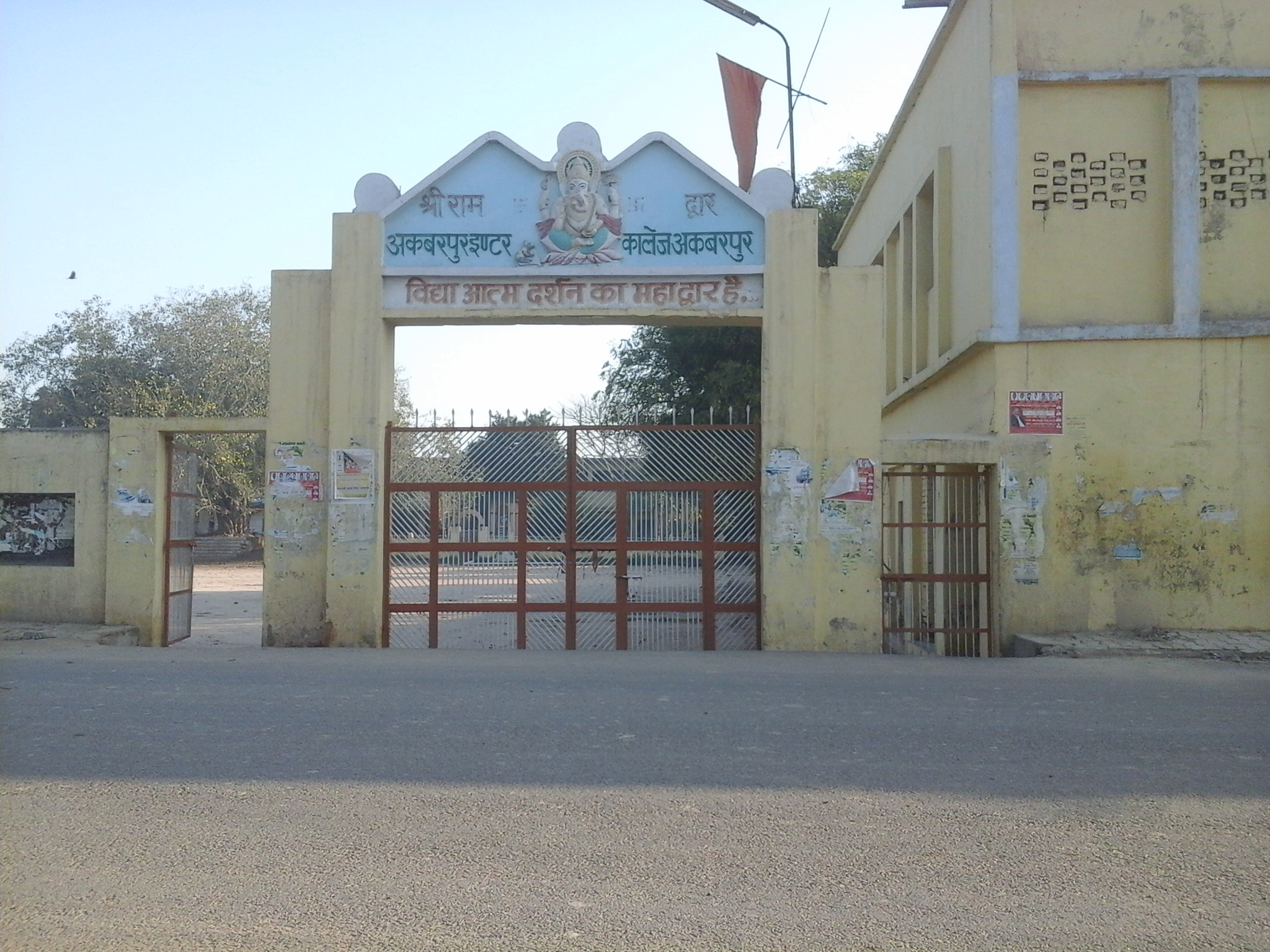
  Akbarpur Inter College Akbarpur, Kanpur Dehat
2. Akbarpur Girls Inter College.
3. Akbarpur Degree College
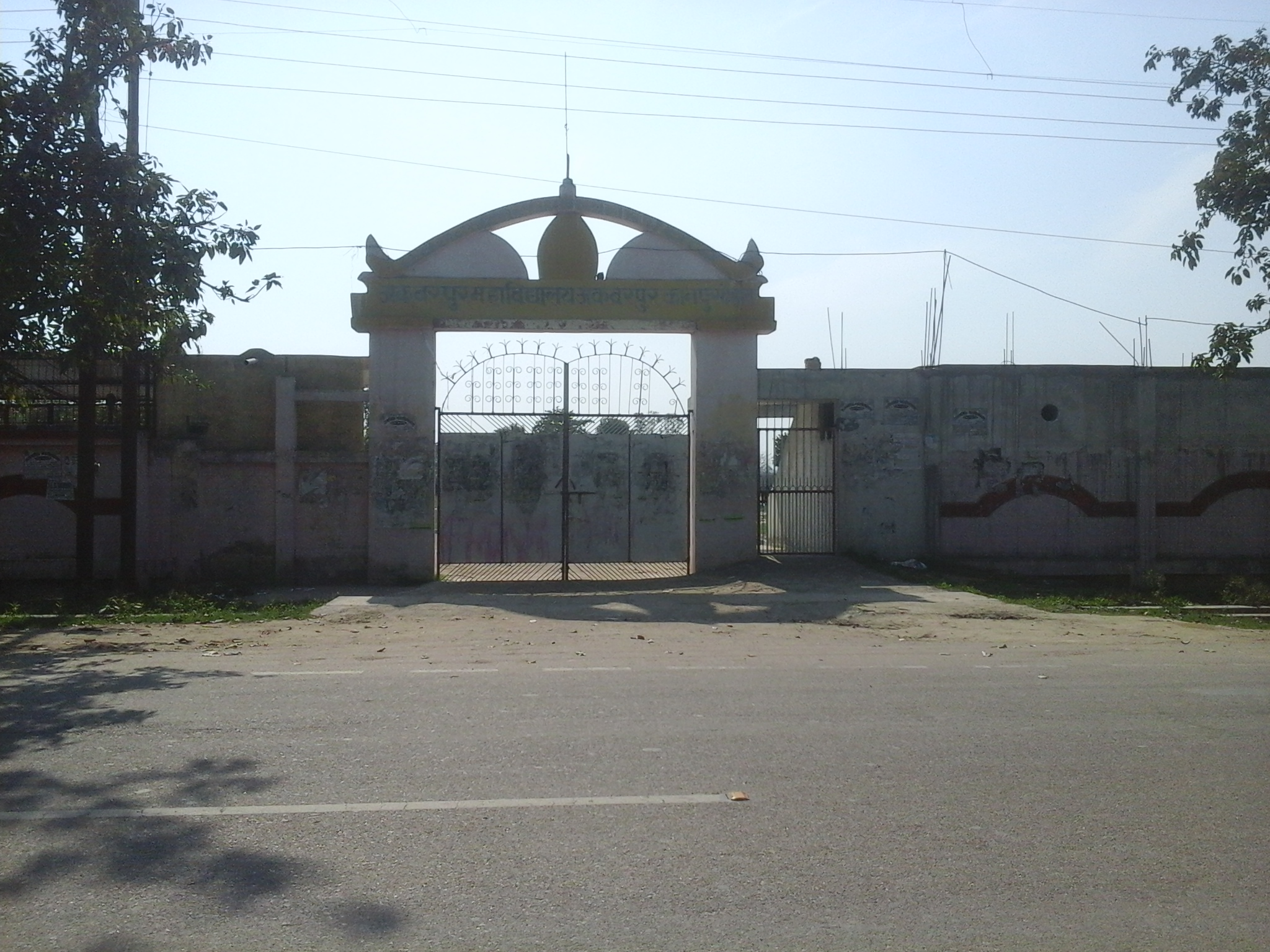
  Akbarpur Degree College
4. Government Degree College, Akbarpur

== Festivals ==
All national festivals, including Holi, Diwali, Mahashivratri, Shri Krishna Janmashtami, Ramnavami, Makara Sankranti, Eid-ul-Fitr, Rakshabandhan, and Hanuman Jayanti, are celebrated with enthusiasm in Akbarpur. Additionally, several local festivals, such as Nag Panchami, Navratri, and Durga Puja, are observed with great fervour.

A glimpse of Bengal’s culture can be witnessed in Akbarpur during Durga Puja. Various cultural events are organised during the celebrations, which attract thousands of visitors daily to seek the blessings of Goddess Durga.

Savitri Vrat and Navratri Vrat are the major festivals for women in Akbarpur. During Savitri Vrat, women perform 101 circumambulations around a banyan tree as part of the ritual.

Vijayadashami (Dussehra) is the most prominent festival in Akbarpur, celebrated continuously for one month. A fair is also organised for 15 days, adding to the festive spirit of the town.

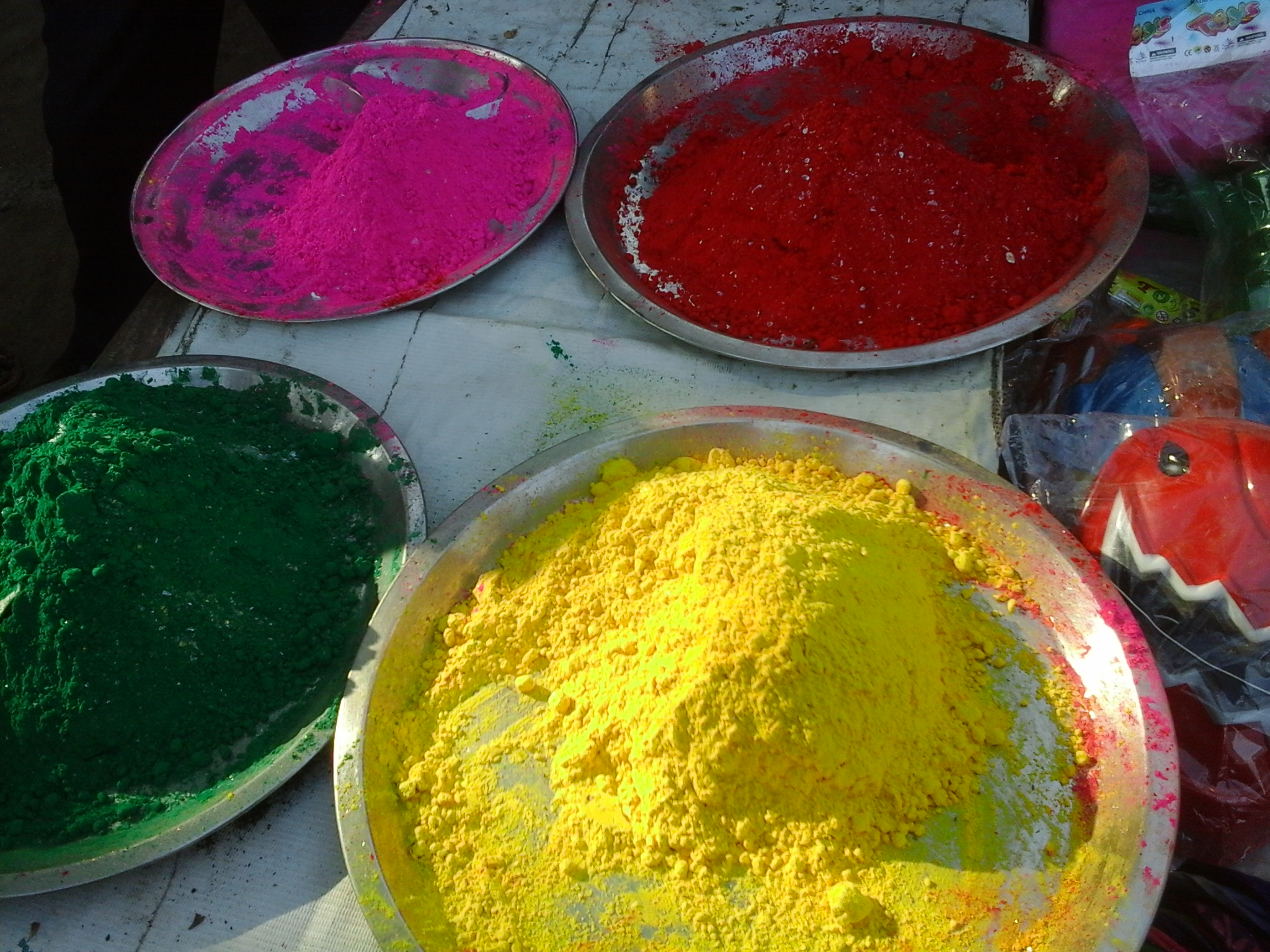
Holi -Holi

== Historical places ==
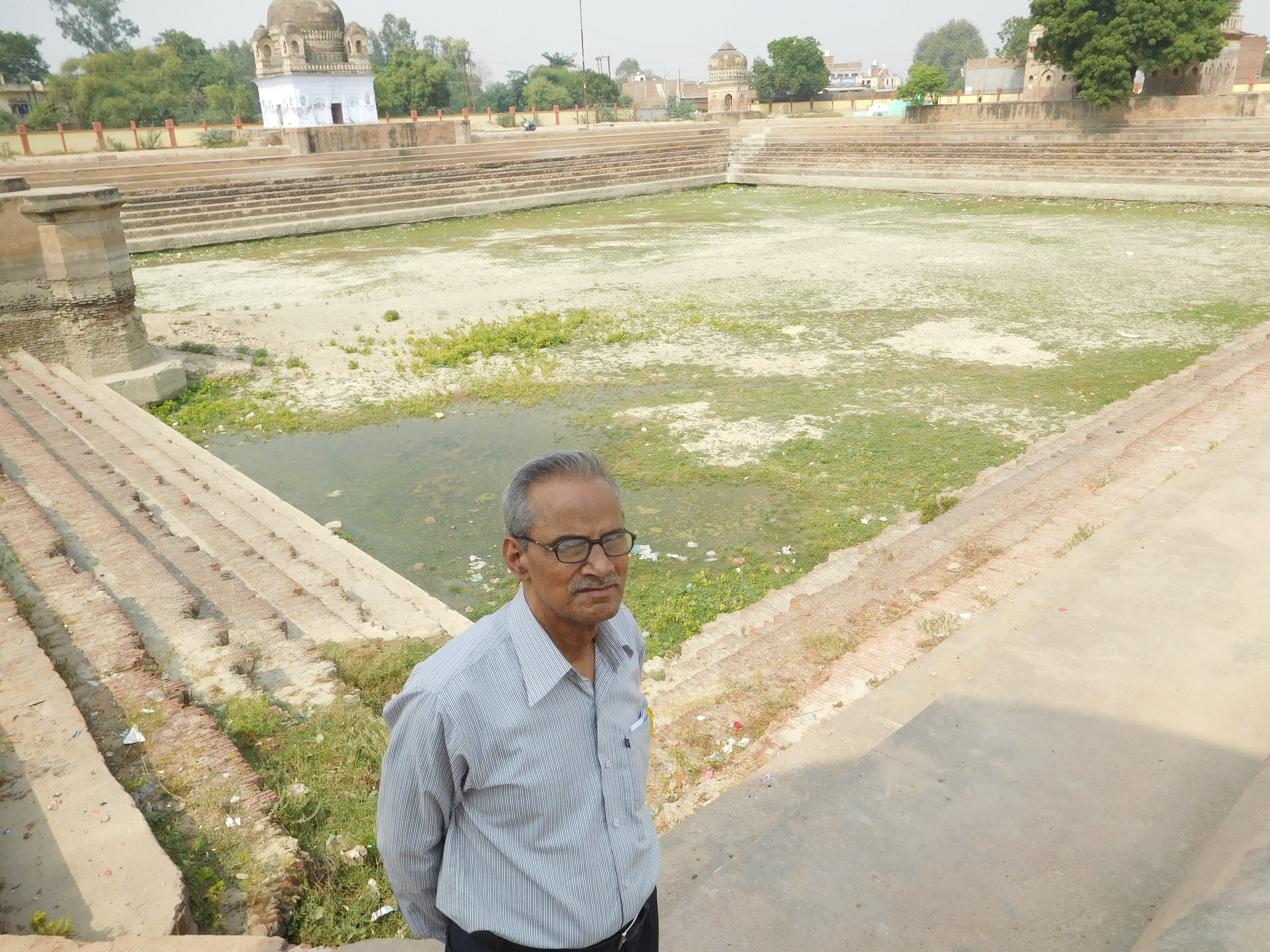
Shukla Talab (dry view)

1. Shukla Talab, also known as Shukul Talab, is a pond that was constructed in 1578 by Sheetal Shukla.
2. Kalaran Talab is another historical pond, built by Chhabba Kalar.

== Sacred places ==
1. Kalka Devi Mandir hosts a fair during Navratra Puja, attracting a large number of devotees.
2. The Shani Dev Temple is located near Hindi Bhawan on Rura Road.
3. The Shiv Temple is situated at Shukla Talab and is a place of worship for Lord Shiva.

== Hindi Bhawan ==
Hindi Bhawan is a convention centre located in the town of Akbarpur.

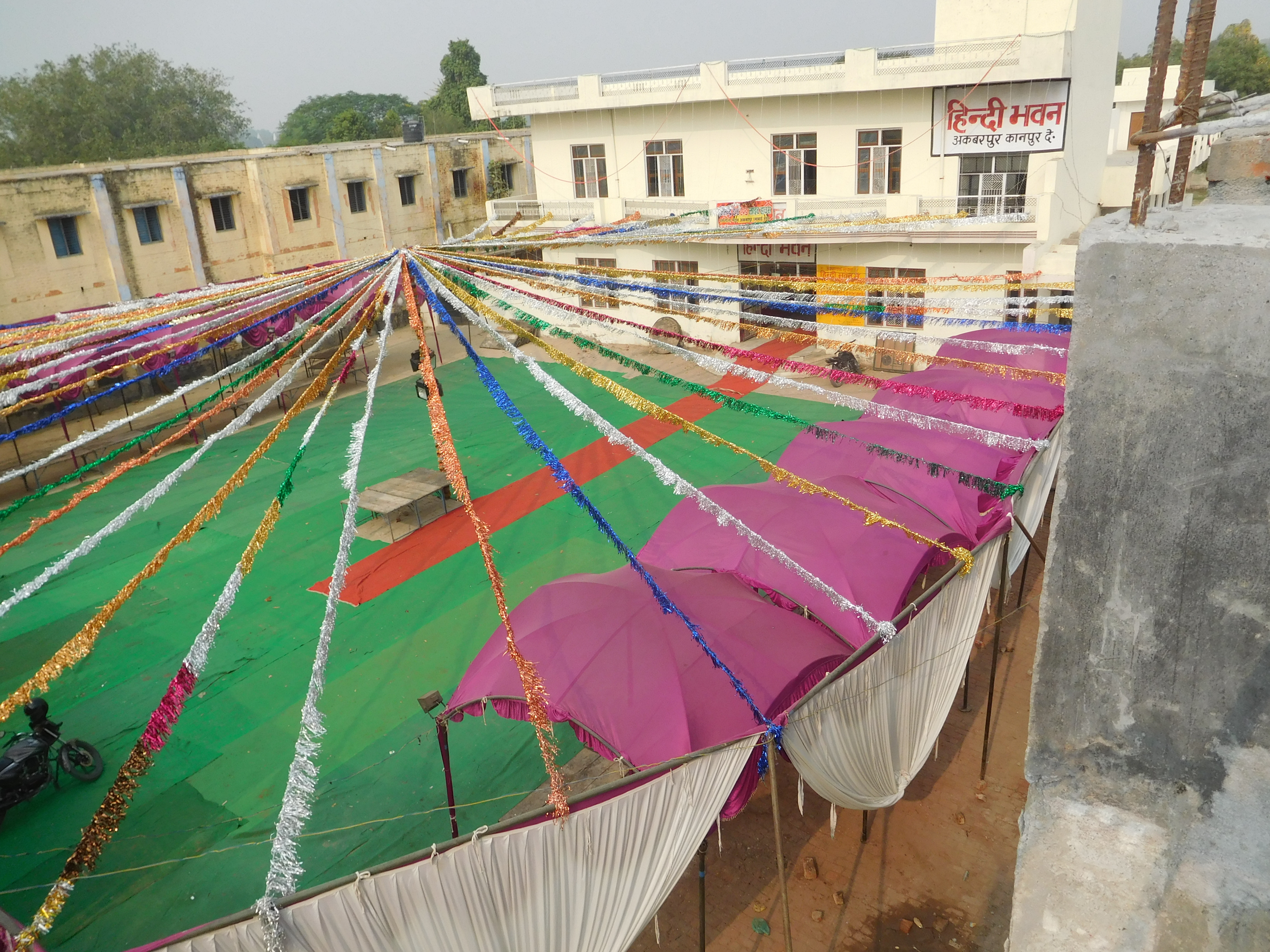
Hindi Bhawan

== Tourist attractions ==
Akbarpur offers several tourist attractions, including Tilas along the Yamuna River. Shivli Lake, a saltwater lake, is a major tourist destination. The lake features temples and islands at its centre. It is located in the western part of the city, approximately 20 km away.

== Growth of industries ==
The industrial expansion in Kanpur city has led to substantial growth of industries on the eastern side of the city.

Kanpur Dehat is a relatively underdeveloped district in Uttar Pradesh. There are only three developed blocks where industrial areas and estates are available—Jainpur, Sarvankhera, and Rania, located in Akbarpur tehsil. Apart from these, some industrial development has also occurred in Bhognipur and Amraudha.

The primary products manufactured in the towns of Ramabai Nagar include leather goods, handloom cloth, medicines, shoes, aluminium utensils, raw leather, tractor trolleys, mustard oil, flour, and agricultural implements. The main imports for the towns in the district are leather, iron, foodgrains, yarn, wood, cloth, and fertilisers.

Industrial areas and estates

The main industrial area is located in Jainpur in Akbarpur block, about 38 km from Kanpur city, on both sides of Kalpi Road. The Uttar Pradesh State Industrial Development Corporation (UPSIDC) has developed a large industrial area measuring approximately 294.70 acres in Jainpur.

Similarly, two industrial areas have been developed by UPSIDC at site no. 1 and 2 in Rania, covering a total area of 15.70 acres, with 47 and 68 developed plots, respectively. Additionally, another industrial estate has been developed in Rania, offering 100 developed plots and 8 sheds.

== Sister cities ==
Akbarpur shares friendly relations with pukhrayan, Uttar Pradesh

== Gallery ==
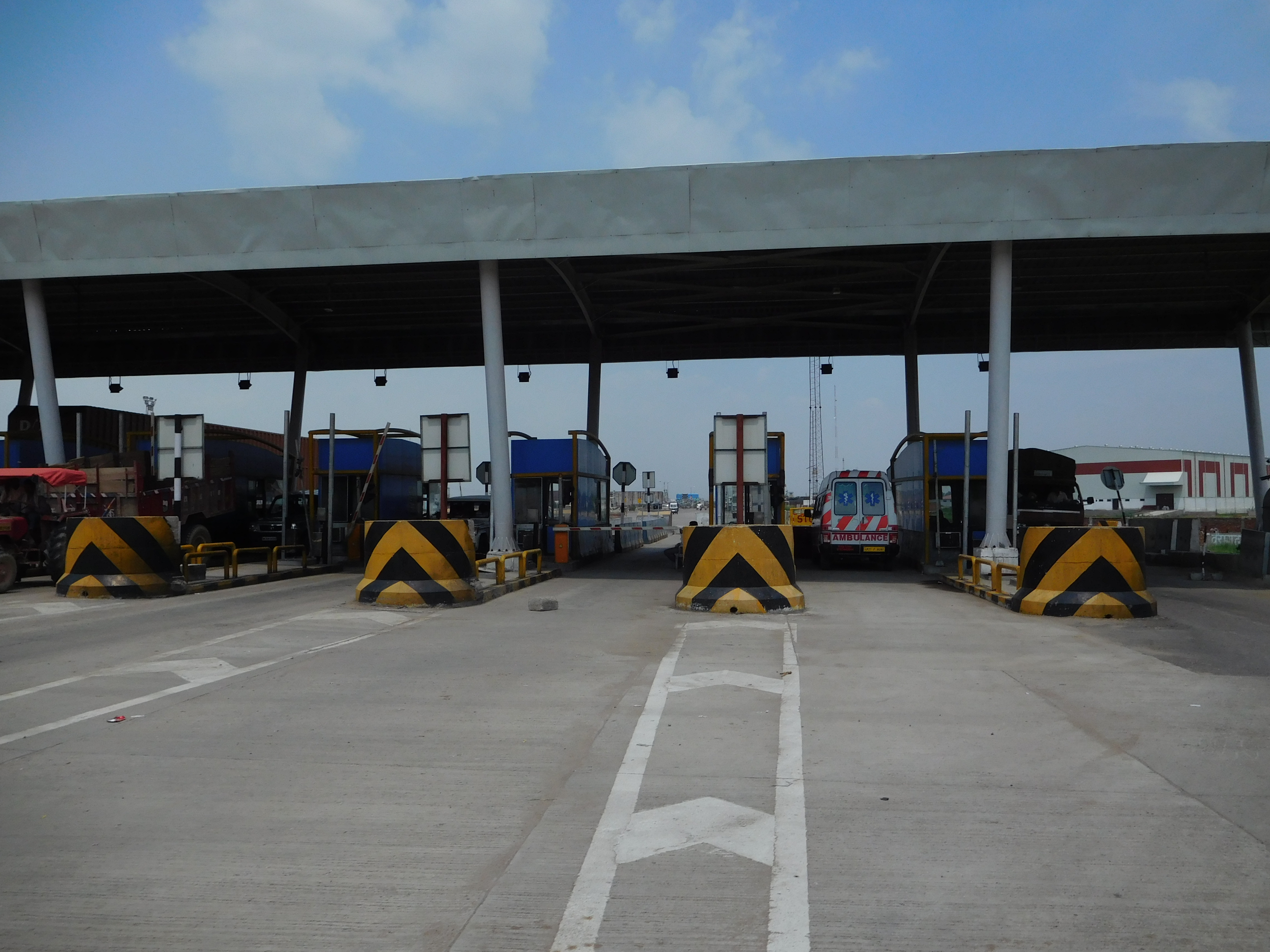
Bara Toll Plaza

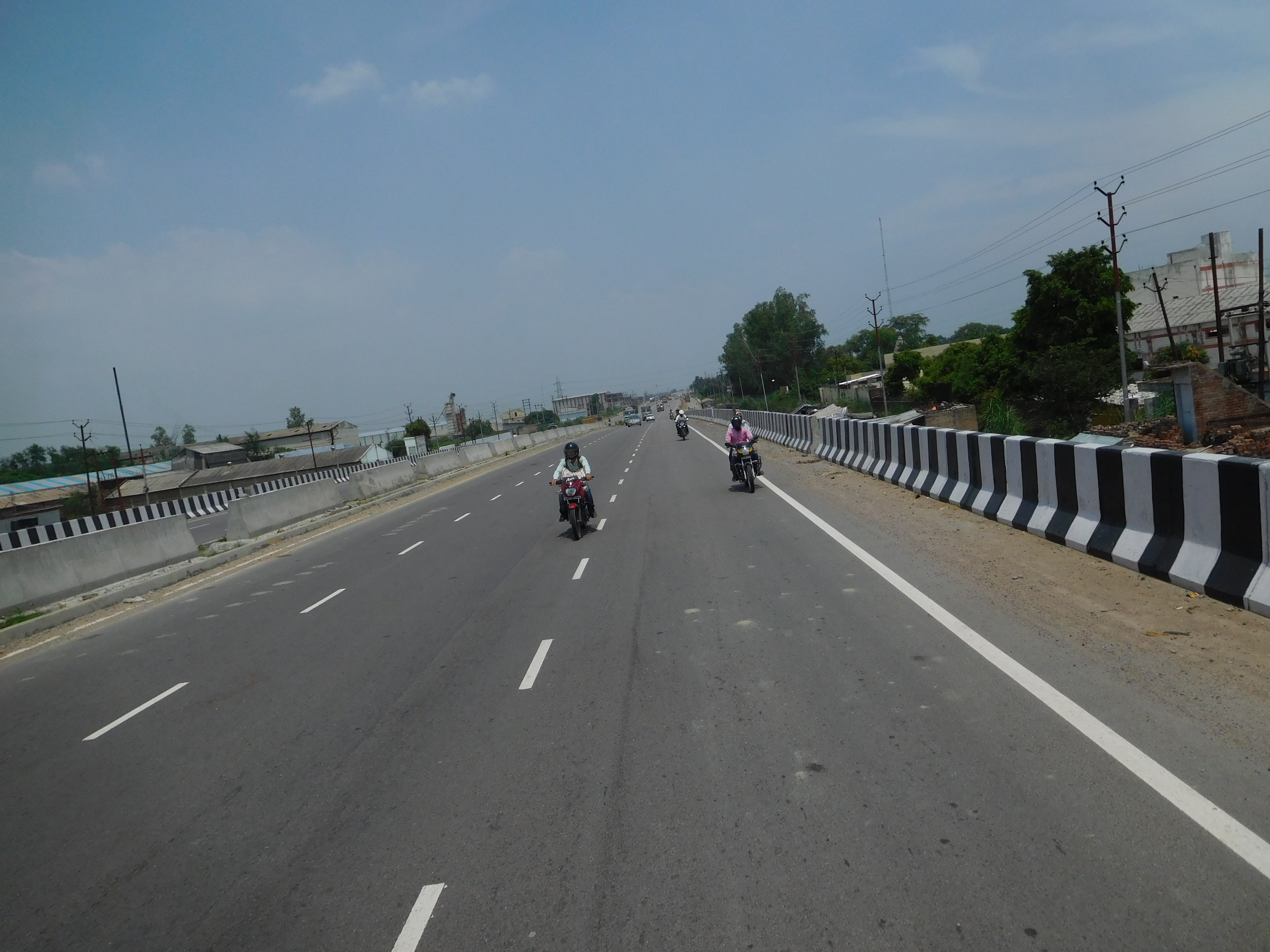
Lucknow -Jhansi Road

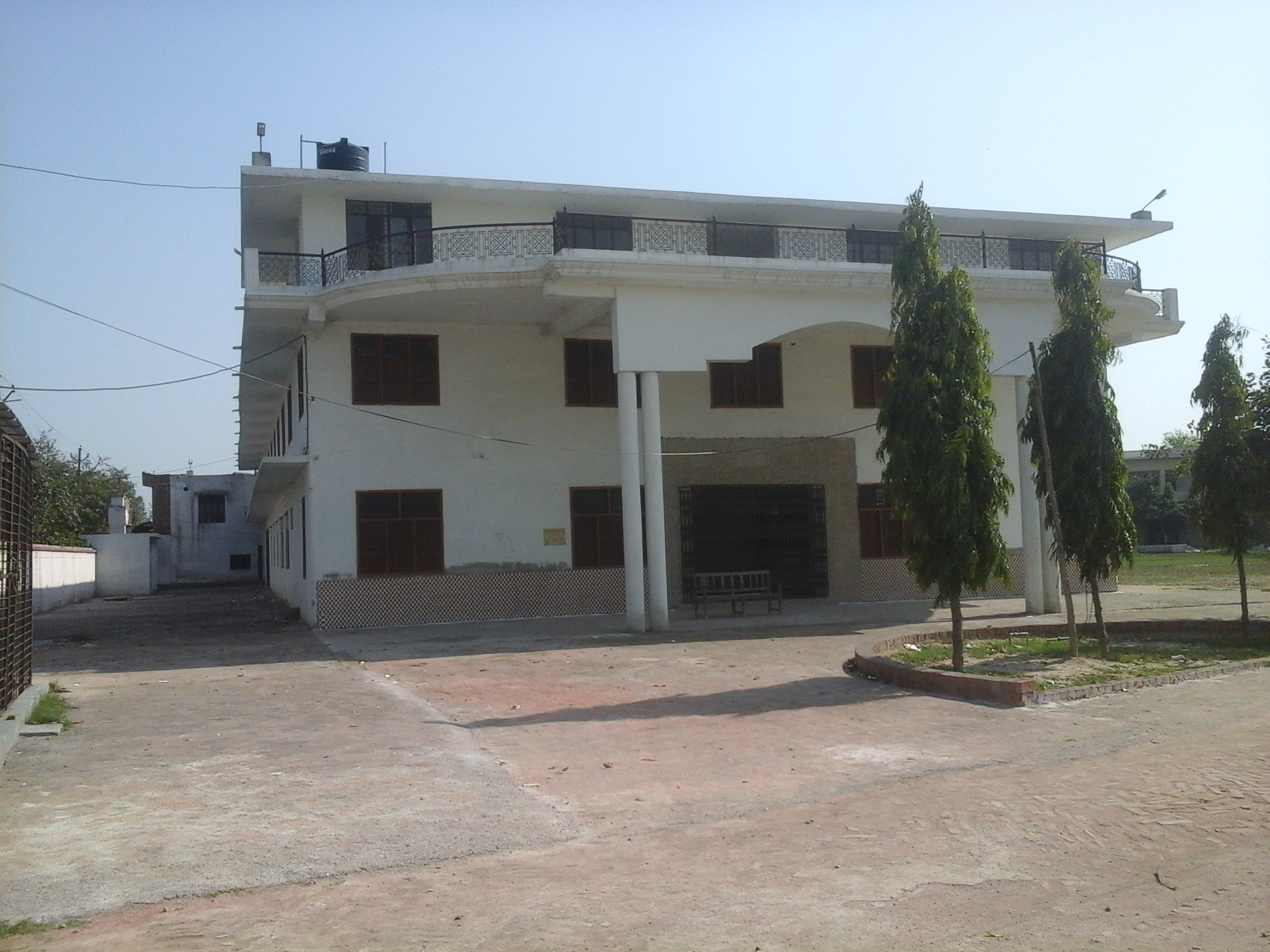
Akbarpur Degree College (internal side view)

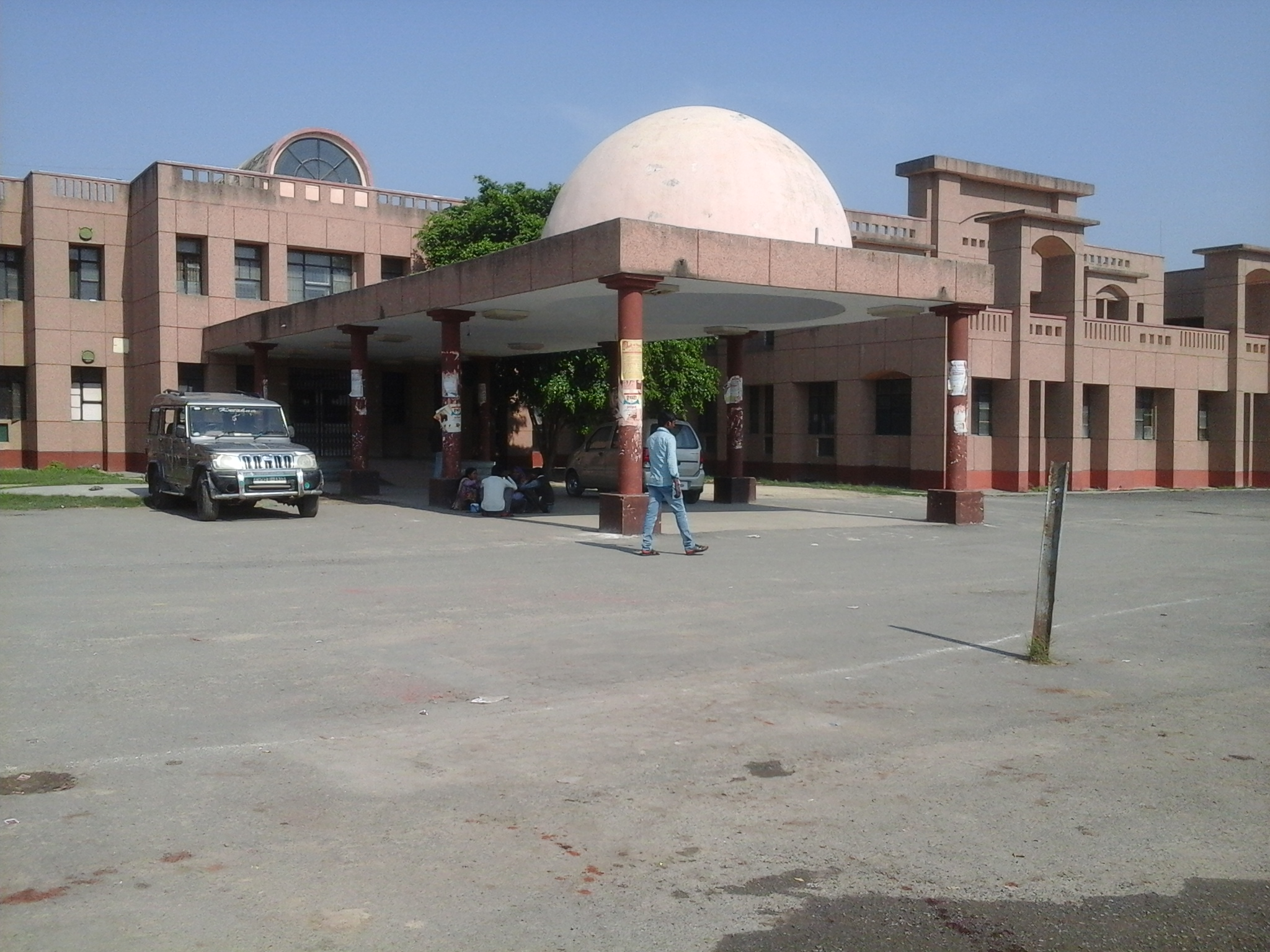
District Hospital

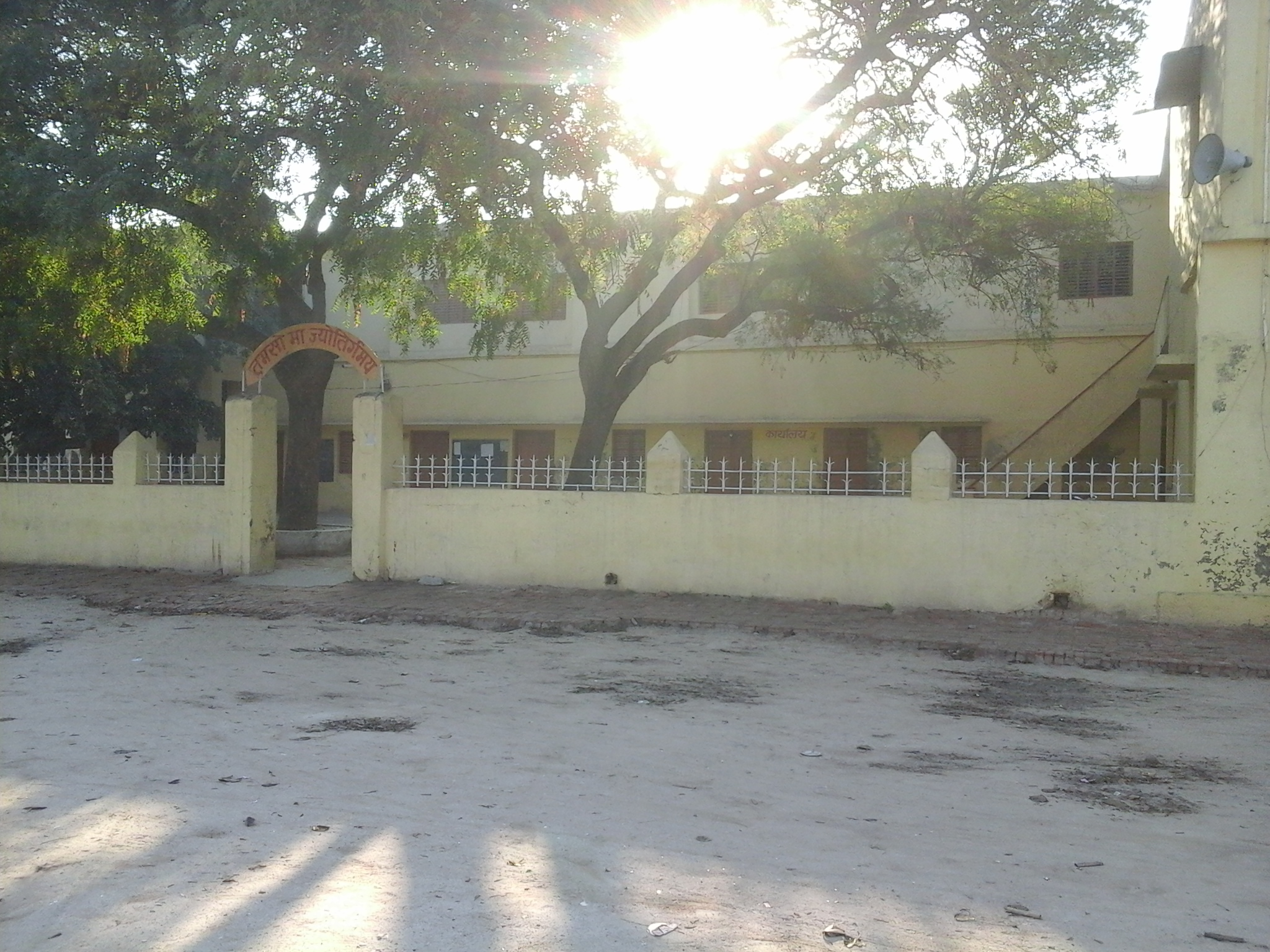
Akbarpur Inter College Akbarpur Kanpur -Dehat

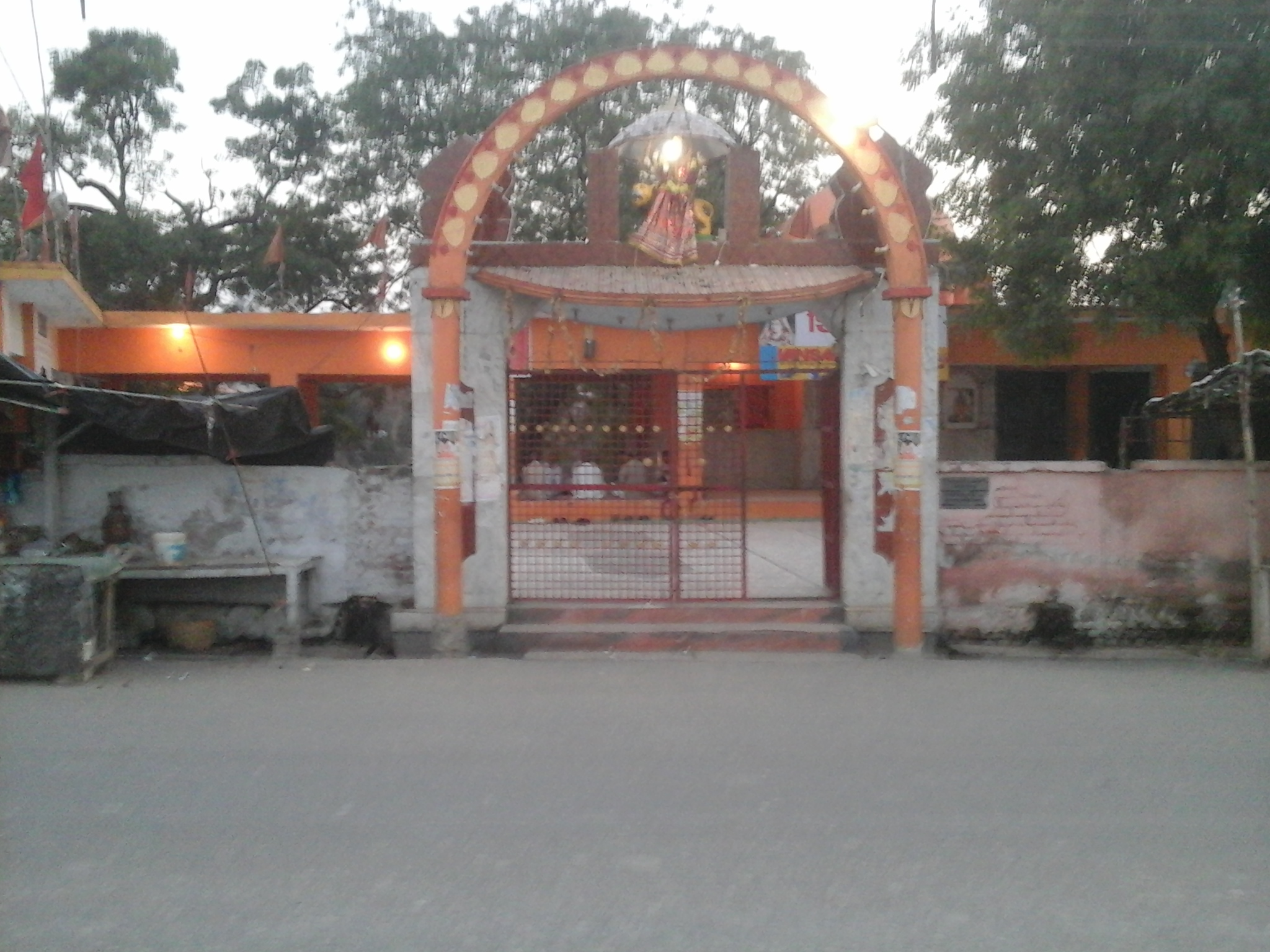
Kalika Devi Mandir

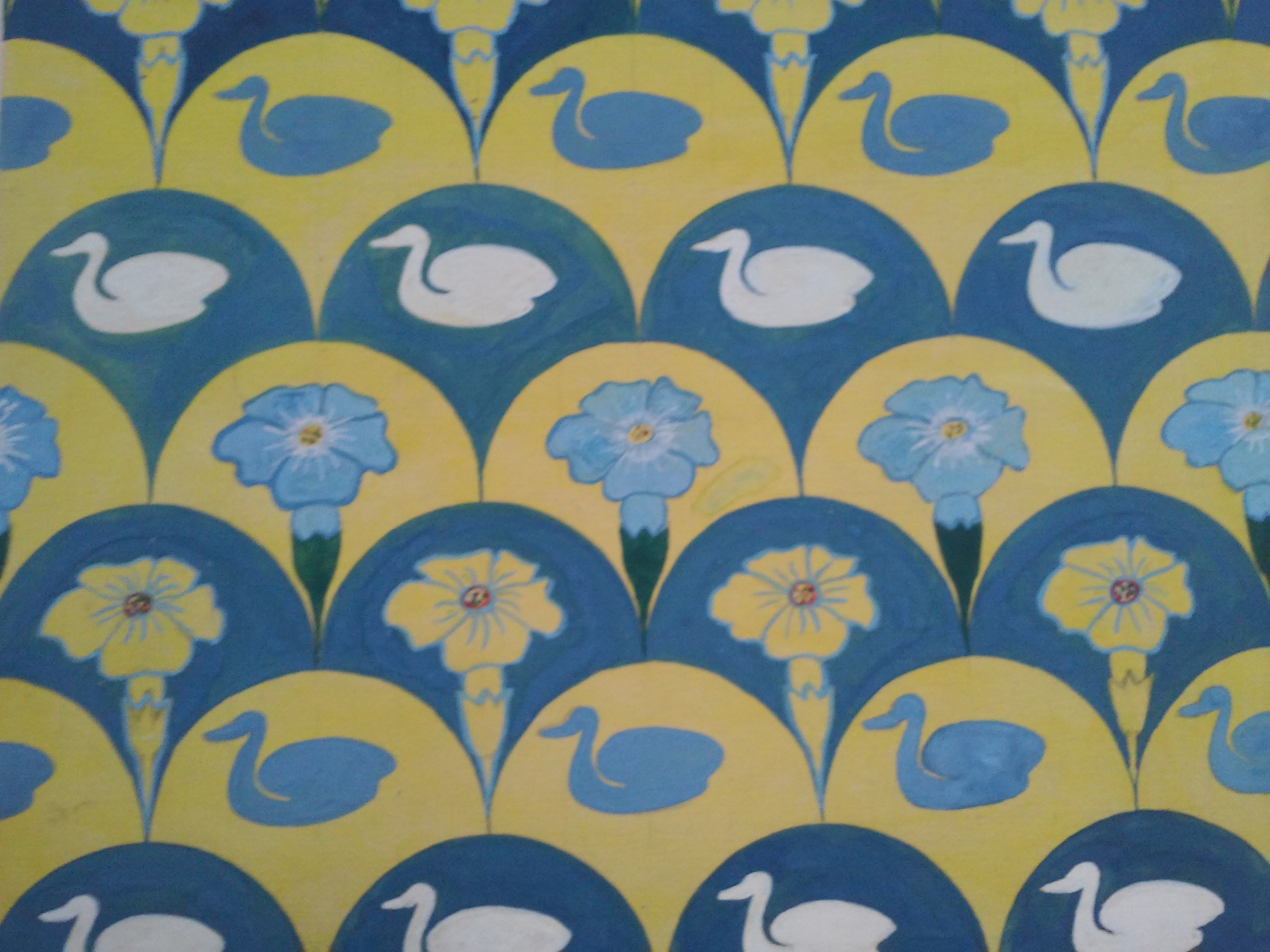
Water Colors Design

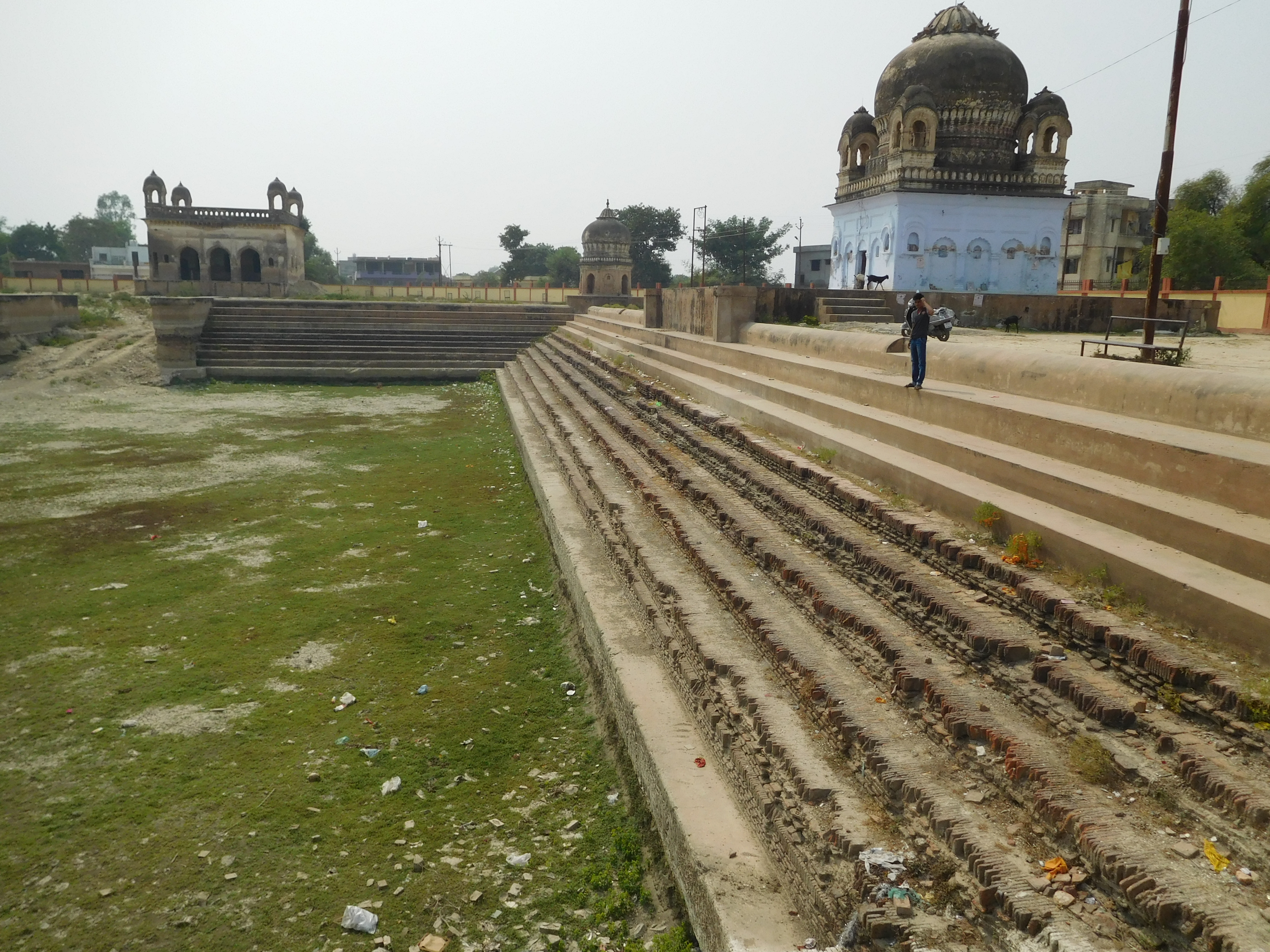
Shukla Talab (West view)

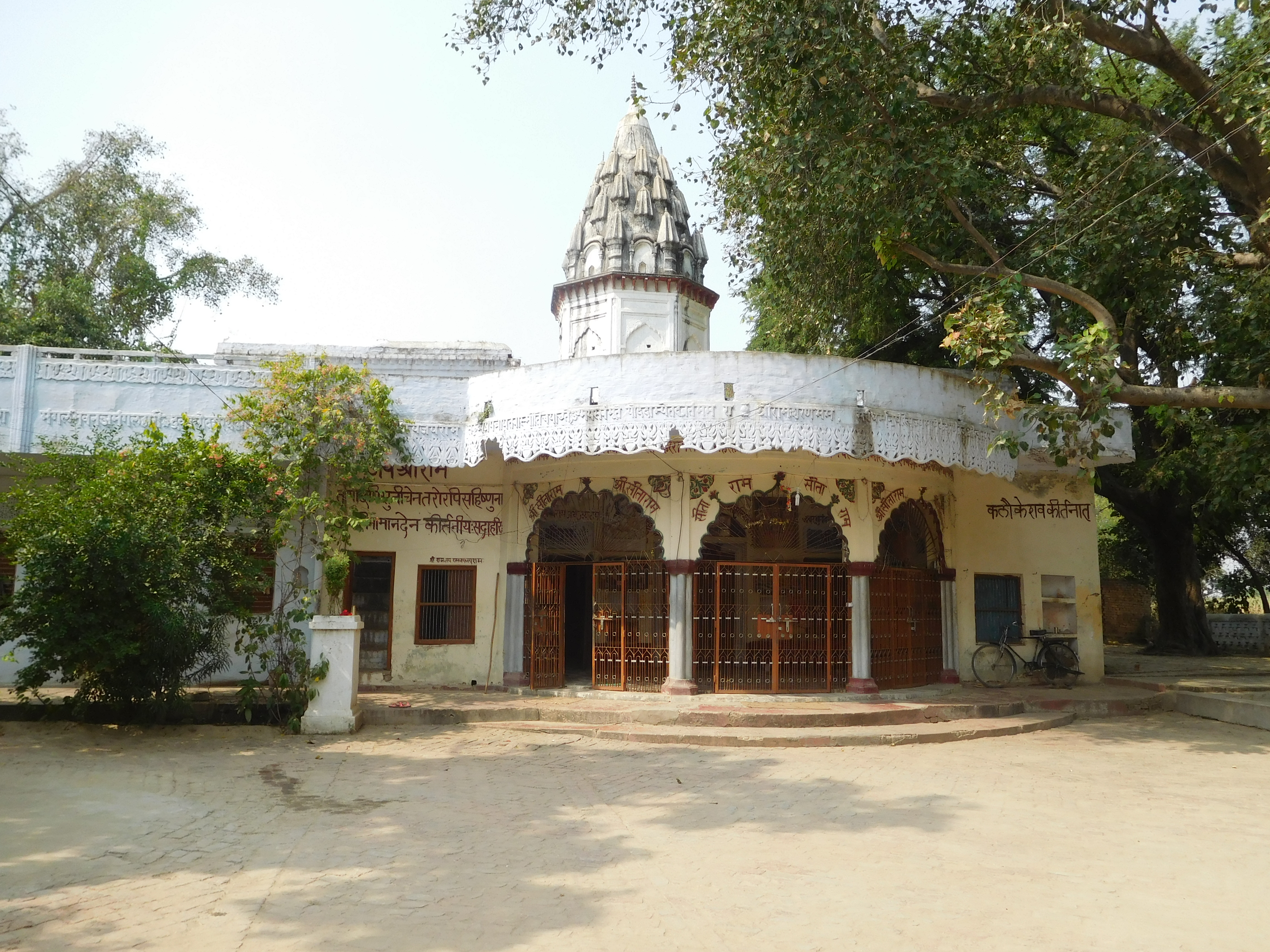
Shri Ram Janki Temple

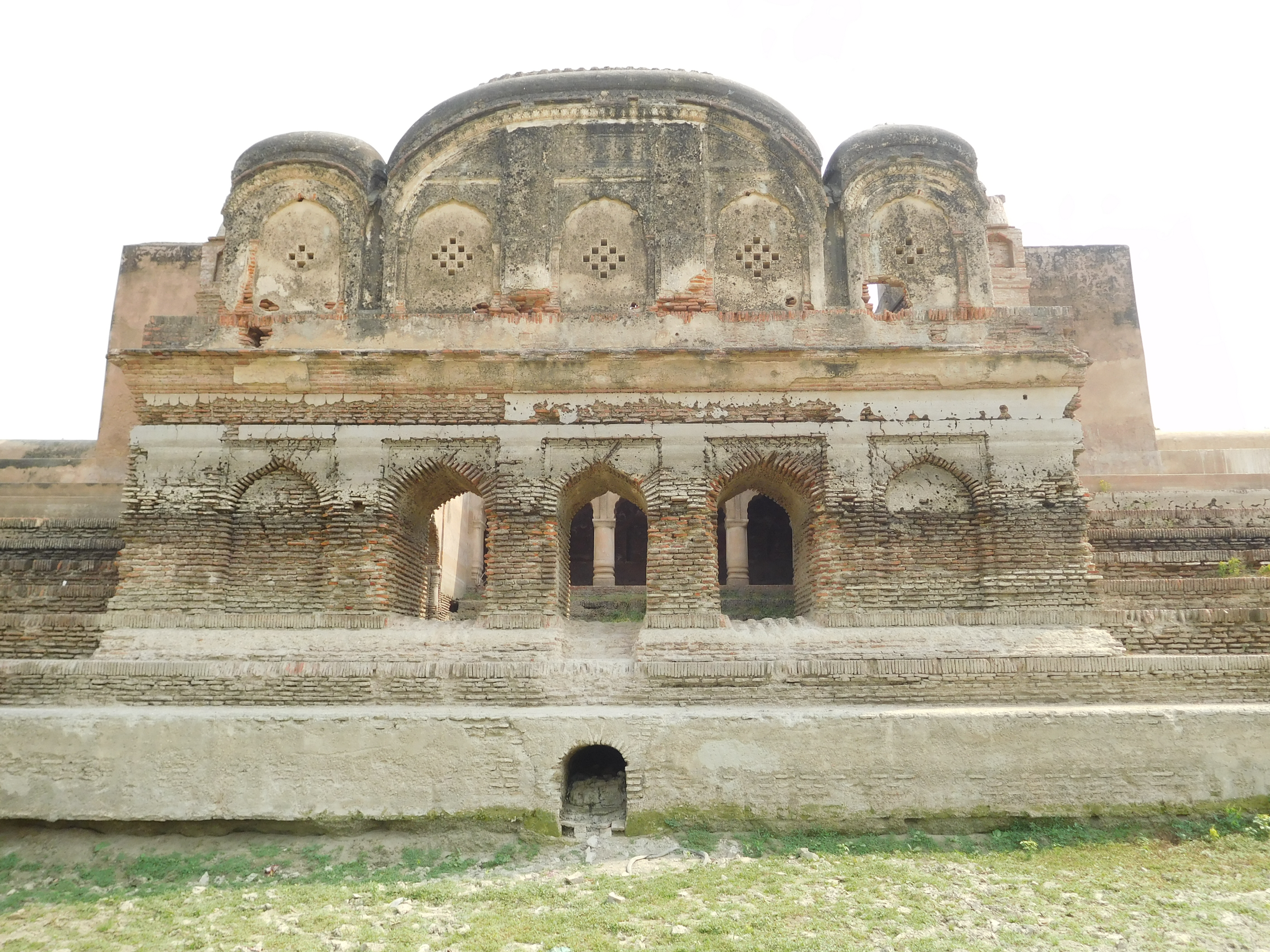
Shukla Talab-2

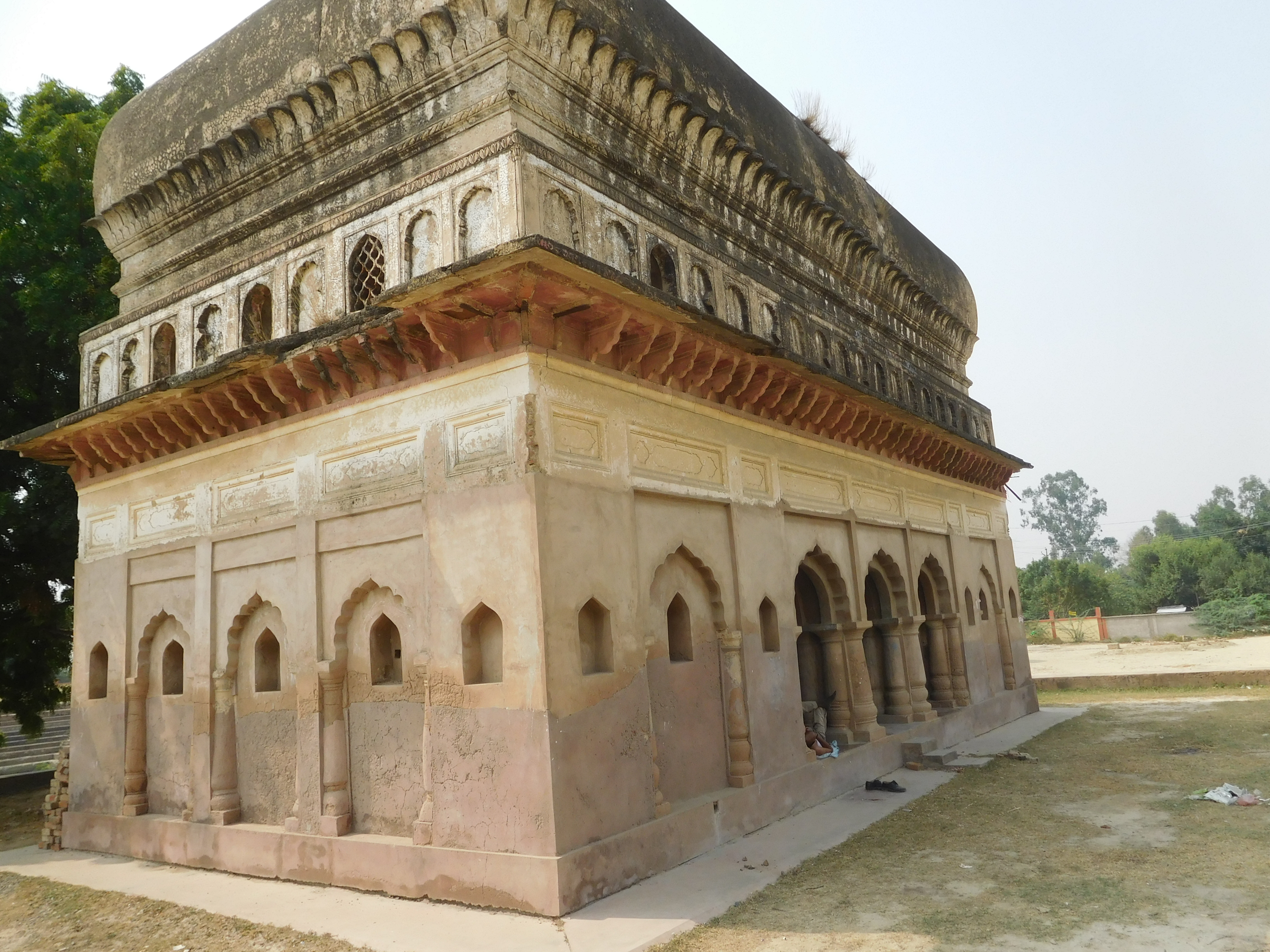
Shukla Talab-3
