= Chhatari =

Chhatari Chhatradhari
- Town
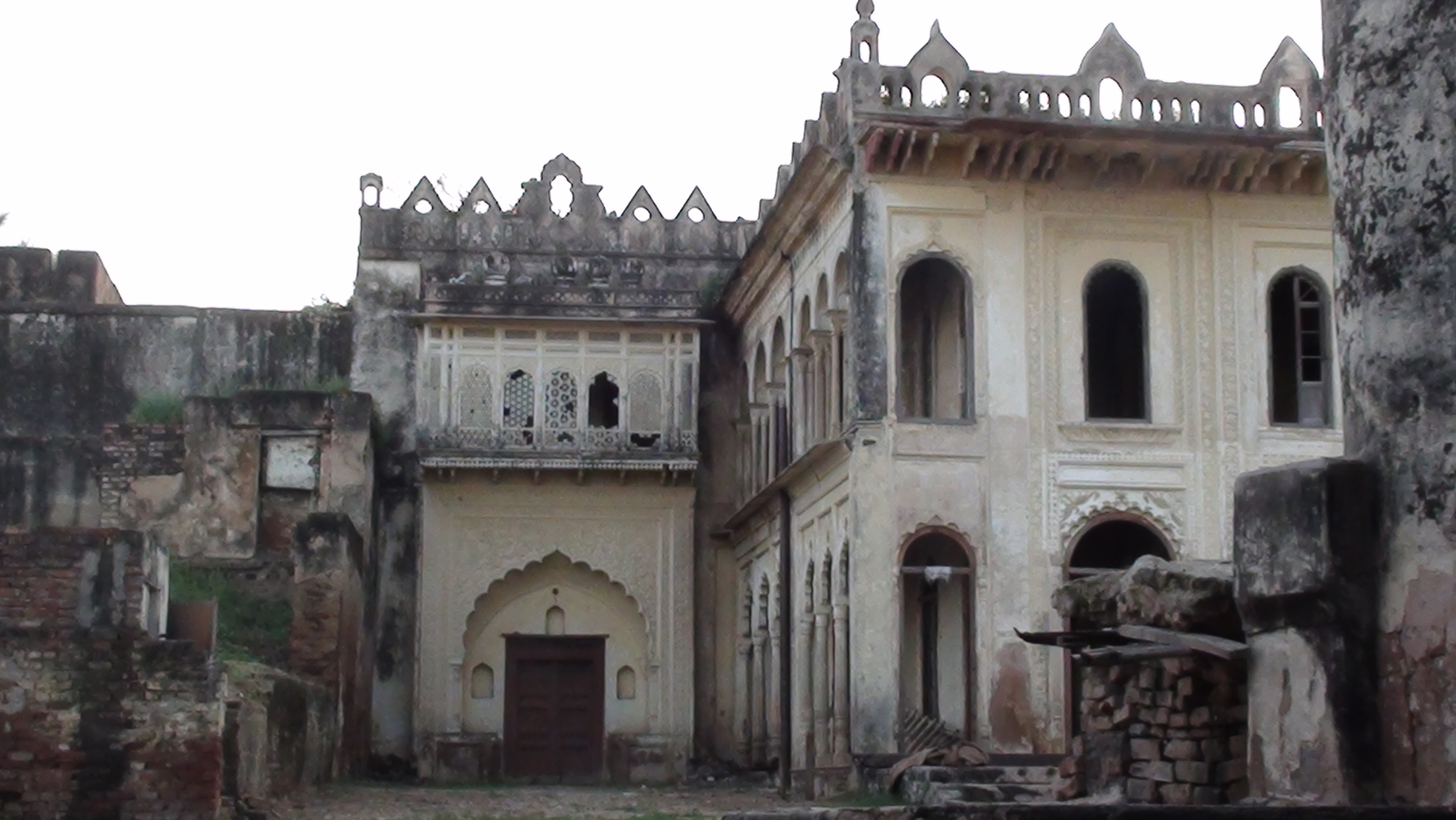
- The inside gate of Chhatari Garhi

- Location in Uttar Pradesh, India
- Coordinates: 28°06′44″N 78°09′09″E
- Country: India
- State: Uttar Pradesh
- District: Bulandshahr

Population (2019)
  - Total: 15,786

Languages
  - Official: Hindi
  - Additional official: Urdu
- Time zone: UTC+5:30 (IST)
- Postal code: 203397
- Vehicle registration: UP-13

Chhatari is a Town in Bulandshahr district in the state of Uttar Pradesh, India.

== History ==
Chhatari was a jagir during British India. It was owned by Nawabs of Lalkhani, a Badgujar Rajput community.

=== Nawabs of Chhatari ===
- Nawab Mardan Ali Khan
- Nawab Mehmud Ali Khan
- Nawab Luft Ali Khan
- Nawab Abdul Ali Khan IV
- Nawab Abdul Samad Khan (1862–1922)
- Nawab Abdul Sami Khan
- Nawab Hafiz Sir Ahmad Said Khan I (1888–1981)

== Amenities ==
There are two nationalized bank, one degree college, a sub post office and also have an agro-products trading center for farmers residing near town.

== Demographics ==
As of 2001 India census, Chhatari had a population of 15786. Males constitute 54% of the population and females 46%.

== Notable people ==
- Muhammad Ahmad Said Khan Chhatari "Nawab of Chhatari", a prominent Muslim League politician, and last Prime Minister of the Hyderabad State. Also the first Chief Minister of Uttar Pradesh.
