= Dharmapuri (Puducherry) =

- city
- Location in Puducherry, India
- Coordinates: 11.939612°N 79.77848°E
- Country: India
- State: Puducherry
- District: Pondicherry

Population (2011)
  - Total: 8,666

Languages
  - Official: Tamil
  - Additional: English, French
- Time zone: UTC+5:30 (IST)
- Postal code: 605009
- Vehicle registration: PY-05

Dharmapuri is a ward in Oulgaret Municipality of Pondicherry district in the Indian union territory of Puducherry.

== Demographics ==
This ward has government fair price shop, Anganwadi Centre catering amenities to women and child in this ward, one Government Primary School & High School for serving the general public of this ward. This ward comes under oulgaret municipality and is also a hamlet in thattanchavaday Revenue Village of oulgaret taluk.

Ward Name	1991 Population Census	2001 Population Census	2011 Population Census
Dharmapuri	3096	4725	8666

After delimitation in 2019 the population of ward dharmapuri is 8666 and ward number is 30. There is a children park at Dr.Puratchithalainagar 3rd cross and an overhead water tank which acts as a major source of supply providing metered water connection through the government of Puducherry. A temple for wisdom named "gnalayam" is also available in this locality. Around 3 to 4 marriage halls are available in this ward. The governmental primary school dharmapuri and the governmental high school are located in the same complex in vazhudavour road, opposite to sri ram thirumanamandapam. Most of the population here are non agricultural workers.

== Temples ==
- Sri dhrowbathiamman Temple
- Hanuman Temple
- Sri angalamman temple
- Gangaiamman temple

== Sources ==
- http://pandr.puducherry.gov.in/Plan%20Formulation/Plan%20Document/DAP%202002-03/pdffiles/scp/23-43.pdf
- http://statistics.puducherry.gov.in/abstract2005-06/Appendix%20II/wardwise_population.pdf
