= Anup Rai =

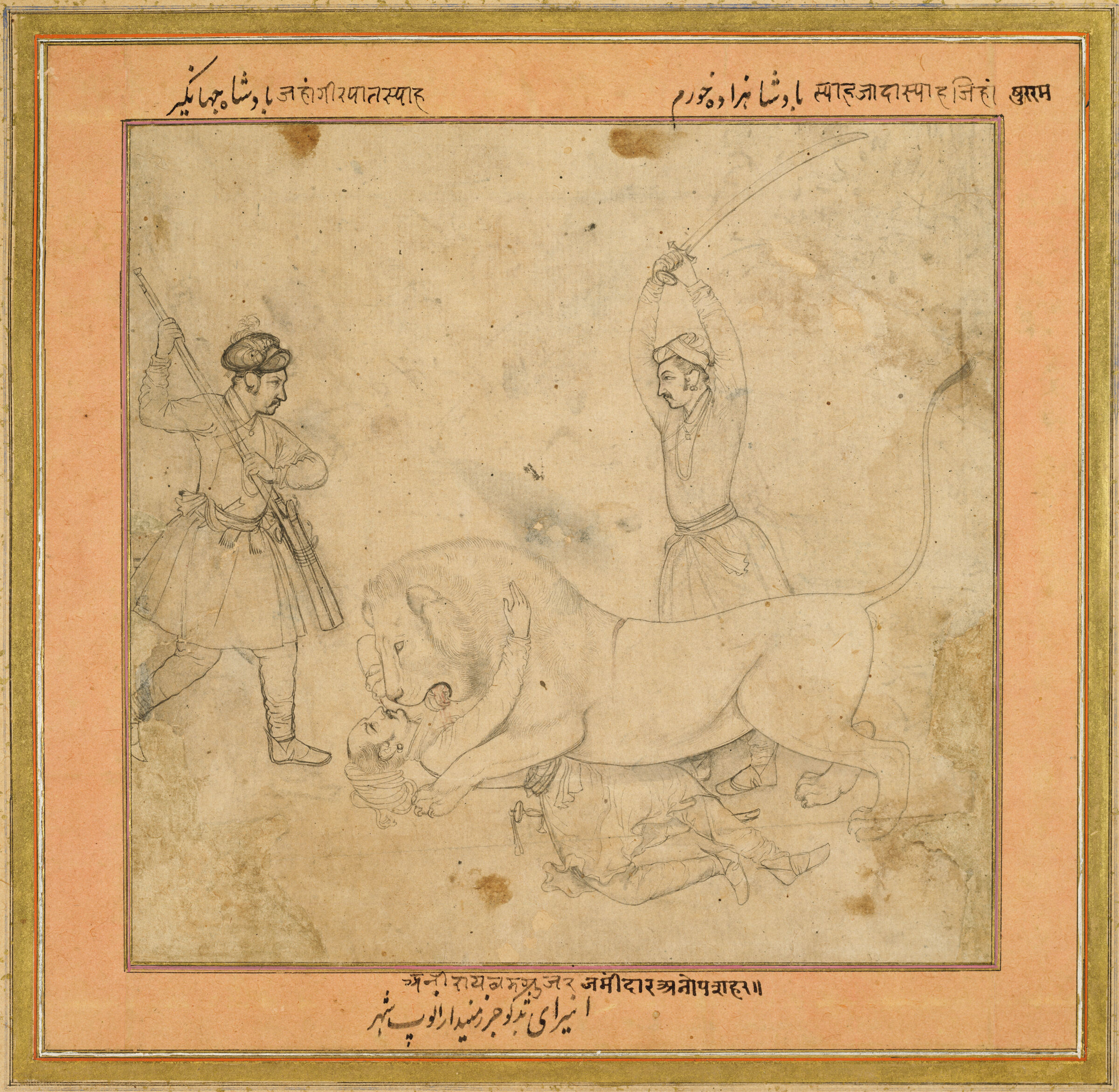
'Courtier Raja Anup Rai Intercepting a Lion Attack, with Mughal Emperor Jahangir and Prince Khurram', by Abu’l Hasan, ca.1611–1630.

Raja Anup Rai (Singh Dalan) was a Rajput nobleman of Bargujar ancestry in seventeenth century India, and a courtier of the Mughal emperor, Jahangir. He was also known as Singh Dalan (lion crusher) for intercepting a lion that was on verge of attacking the emperor during a royal hunt.

== The lion hunt ==
The royal party went on a hunt on or around January 6, 1611. Jahangir dismounted from his horse and fired his musket at a lion during the hunt, but only wounded the animal. The lion began to advance on Jahangir, but Rai confronted the animal instead, armed with nothing but a stick. He "manfully faced him and struck him twice with both hands on the head." When the lion still made for the emperor, Anup Rai used his bare arms against the maw of the animal, which grabbed both of Anup Rai's arms in his mouth and dragged him down to his knees. The crown prince, Khurram, and another member of the hunting party, Raja Ram Das, attacked the lion with swords. Prince Khurram struck at the lion's haunches and Raja Ram Das at the shoulder. Somehow Anup Rai managed to free his arms, which had been bitten through, and "struck him two or three times on the cheek with his fist."

Had Rai not intervened, the emperor would likely have been killed. Jahangir was grateful. Rai received thirty-two wounds, which the emperor bound himself, taking him in the emperor's own palanquin. He was made a captain of five-thousand horsemen.

== Khusrau Mirza's captor ==
In 1616, Jahangir asked Rai to keep Prince Khusrau Mirza (Jahangir's oldest son, whom Roe called Corsoronne) under confinement. Sir Thomas Roe, the first English ambassador in India, records that General Asaf Khan and Prince Eteman Daulat waited until Jahangir was drunk one night and tricked the inebriated emperor into agreeing to release Khusrau into the prince's hands. General Asif Khan immediately went to Rai with an armed guard and demanded Khusrau's delivery to him. The Raja refused, saying that "he had receiued the Prince his brother from the handes of the king and to no other would deliver him (sic)." The next morning, Rai went to the emperor, and "the king replyed: you haue done honestly, faythfully."Khusrau was left in Rai's custodianship for the immediate period.

== Founder of Anupshahr ==
The town of Anupshahr in Bulandshahr district of Uttar Pradesh state was founded by raja Anup singh badgujar.
