= Dharampur, Bankura =

Dharampur Dharmapur
- Village
- Location in West Bengal, India Dharampur (India)
- Coordinates: 23°09′22.1″N 87°19′25.2″E
- Country: India
- State: West Bengal
- District: Bankura

Population (2011)
  - Total: 1,239

Languages
  - Official: Bengali, English
- Time zone: UTC+5:30 (IST)
- Telephone/STD code: 03244
- Lok Sabha constituency: Bishnupur
- Vidhan Sabha constituency: Bishnupur
- Website: bankura.gov.in

Dharampur is a village in Bishnupur CD Block in Bishnupur subdivision of Bankura district in the state of West Bengal, India.

== Demographics ==
As per the 2011 Census of India, Dharampur had a total population of 1,239, of which 637 (60%) were males and 602 (50%) were females. The total number of households in Dharampur was 272. The total area of this village was 131.52 hectares.

== Transport ==
The Bishnupur-Sonamukhi Road passes through Dharampur.

== Healthcare ==
Bhara Public Health Centre functions as the central facility in Bhara. The villagers take free medicine and treatment from this hospital.
