= Dharampur Assembly constituency =

Dharampur Assembly constituency may refer to:

- Dharmapur Assembly constituency in Assam
- Dharampur, Gujarat Assembly constituency
- Dharampur, Himachal Pradesh Assembly constituency
- Dharampur, Uttarakhand Assembly constituency
