= Bargujar =

Clan of Rajputs in India

The Badgujar (also spelt as Bargujar, Badgurjar and Bada Gurjar or Bara Gurjar) is a clan of Rajputs. They are also a distinct caste in Maharashtra state of India.

== History and Origin ==
Similar to several other Rajput clans, the Badgujars also claim descent from the ancient Suryavanshi king Rama.

The Bargujars ruled over Rajorgarh, Dausa, Deoti and Ghasira, Macheri. They were expelled from Dausa, Rajorgarh and Deoti by Kachhwaha Rajputs when they migrated to Dhundhar. In 11th century Dulha Rai, won the areas of Dausa and Deoti from the Badgujar Rajputs, who were thus reduced to status of a feudatory or jagirdars. In 18th century Surajmal with the help of Mughal wazir took the Bargujar stronghold of Ghasera from its ruler Bahadur Singh Badgurjar which was again recovered by Bahadur Singh's son with the help of Imad ul MulK.

== Princely State & Jagirs controlled by Bargujars ==
The Samthar princely state was one of the most prominent state ruled by the Bargujar Rajputs. The other states ruled by the Bargujar Rajputs were Daria Kheri, Dhabla Dhir, Dhabla Ghosi, Kamalpur.Other important Jagir once controlled by Badgujars was Barauli Rao.

== Heritage ==
The Ghasera Fort and Khandar Fort are among the two major forts built by Bargujar Rajput rulers.

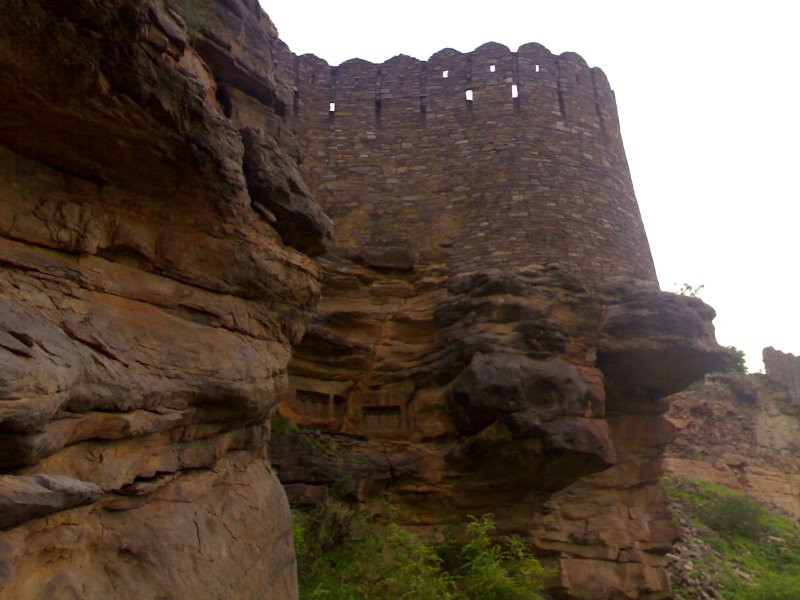
Khandar Fort

== Distribution ==
They are mainly distributed parts of present-day Rajasthan, Uttar Pradesh and Madhya Pradesh.

== Notable people ==
- Raja Pratap Singh Badgujar
- Raja Anup singh Badgujar
- Raj Kunwar Singh

== See also ==
- Mahida Rajput
- Lalkhani
