= Dharampur, Bulandshahr =

Town in India

Coordinates: 28°08′16″N 78°17′29″E

Dharampur is a small town in Bulandshahr district, Uttar Pradesh, India, with a railway station on the Aligarh-to-Moradabad railway line. The nearest town, Dibai, is only 7 km away, and Aligarh is 35 km away.

The railway code of Dharampur Station in "DMPR".

Before India's independence, during the British Raj, Dharampur was an estate (jagir), and it belonged to jagirdars of Lalkhani Muslim Rajput clan.
