= Alexander Muddiman =

Indian civil servant

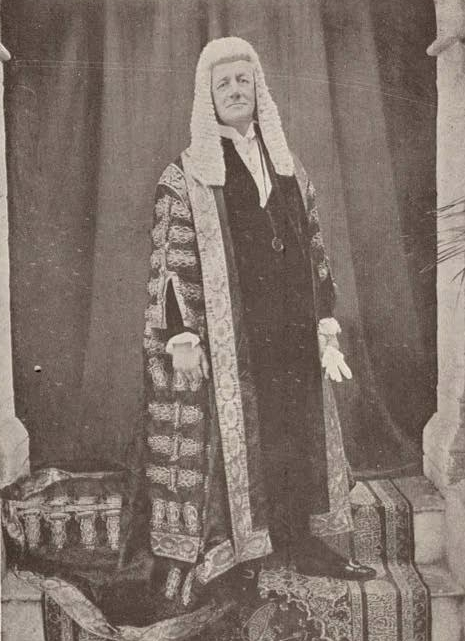

Sir Alexander Phillips Muddiman KCSI CIE (14 February 1875 – 17 July 1928) was a British administrator in India.

Muddiman was born in Leighton Buzzard, Bedfordshire, England, and was educated at Wimborne School and University College, London. He joined the Indian Civil Service in 1897 and was posted to Bengal Presidency in 1899 as an assistant collector and magistrate in Bihar. In 1902 he was appointed Under-Secretary to the Government of Bengal, in 1905 Registrar of the Calcutta High Court, and in April 1910 Deputy Secretary of the Legislative Department of the Government of India. He became Secretary in 1915.

In 1919 he was appointed president of the Council of State, the upper house of the new Indian Legislature. In March 1924 he was appointed Home Member of the Government of India and Leader of the Legislative Assembly, the lower house of the Legislature.

At the end of 1927 he was appointed Governor of the United Provinces, but he was already a sick man and in July 1928 he died of heart failure at Naini Tal.

Muddiman was appointed Companion of the Order of the Indian Empire (CIE) in 1913 and Companion of the Order of the Star of India (CSI) in the 1920 New Year Honours. He was knighted in the 1922 New Year Honours and appointed Knight Commander of the Order of the Star of India (KCSI) in the 1926 Birthday Honours.

== Titles ==
- 1875–1913: Alexander Phillips Muddiman
- 1913–1920: Alexander Phillips Muddiman, CIE
- 1920–1922: Alexander Phillips Muddiman, CSI, CIE
- 1922–1926: Sir Alexander Phillips Muddiman, CSI, CIE
- 1926–1928: Sir Alexander Phillips Muddiman, KCSI, CIE
