= Dharampur, Dahanu =

Village in Maharashtra

Dharampur
- village
- Location in Maharashtra, India Dharampur (India)
- Coordinates: 19.9428348°N 72.9992013°E
- Country: India
- State: Maharashtra
- District: Palghar
- Taluka: Dahanu
- Elevation: 69 m (226 ft)

Population (2011)
  - Total: 1,818
- Time zone: UTC+5:30 (IST)
- 2011 census code: 551669

Dharampur is a village in the Palghar district of Maharashtra, India. It is in the Dahanu taluka.

== Demographics ==
According to the 2011 census of India, Dharampur has 372 households. The effective literacy rate (i.e. the literacy rate of population excluding children aged 6 and below) is 27.28%.

Demographics (2011 Census)
	Total	Male	Female
Population	1818	895	923
Children aged below 6 years	293	159	134
Scheduled caste	0	0	0
Scheduled tribe	1788	879	909
Literates	416	285	131
Workers (all)	1040	527	513
Main workers (total)	986	488	498
Main workers: Cultivators	685	342	343
Main workers: Agricultural labourers	268	126	142
Main workers: Household industry workers	3	0	3
Main workers: Other	30	20	10
Marginal workers (total)	54	39	15
Marginal workers: Cultivators	39	30	9
Marginal workers: Agricultural labourers	10	5	5
Marginal workers: Household industry workers	0	0	0
Marginal workers: Others	5	4	1
Non-workers	778	368	410
