= Dharampura, Aurangabad =

Village in Aurangabad district, Bihar, India

Dharmpura or Dharampura is a village in the Indian state of Bihar. It is located in Deo block in the district of Aurangabad.
