= Dharampur, Prayagraj =

Village in Uttar Pradesh, India

Dharampur, also known as Dhuravan Sakorais a village in Prayagraj, Uttar Pradesh, India.
