= Raja Pratap Singh =

Raja Pratap Singh Barauli
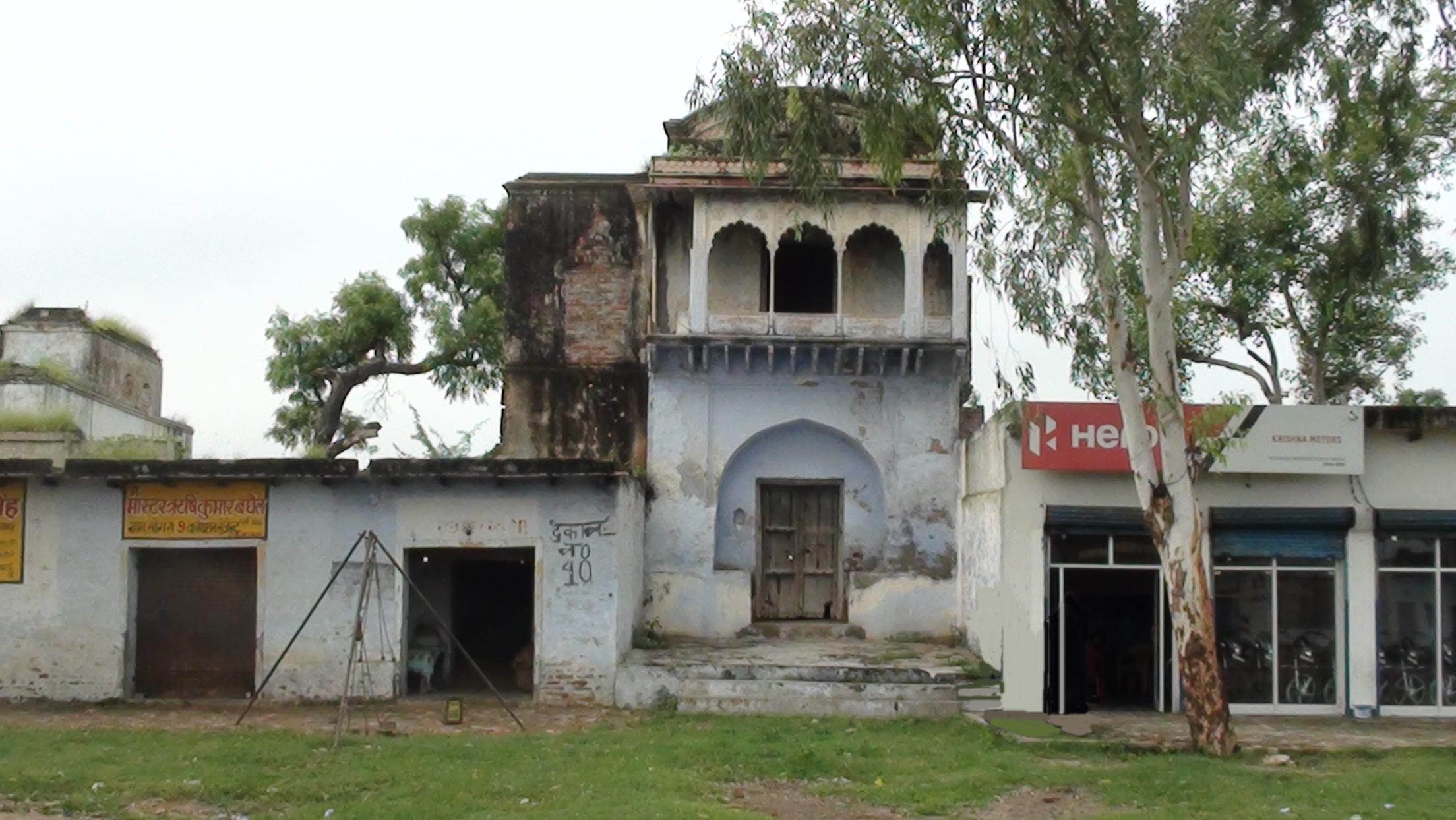

Founder Rao of Barauli
- Succeeded by: Rao Ran ju

Personal details
- Children: Rao Ran ju, Rao BasantPal, Rao Jatu ji, Rao Hathi Shah & Rao Budhan Dev

Raja Pratap Singh was the founder Raja of Barauli, in the Aligarh district. He close associate of Prithiviraj Chauhan, who founded his kingdom with capital at Barauli near Bulandshahar after defeating the Meos from Pahasu, Dibai and Anupshahr. He belonged to the royal Bargujar family of Macheri area near Alwar and was invited by Prithviraj Chauhan to this area.

He settled in Pahasu in the centre of his newly acquired estate, where he rapidly acquired great power. Raja Pratap Singh married the daughter of Raja Door and populated the town of Barauli in Samvat 1122 (1065 AD) when there were 1656 villages attached to it.
