= Lalkhani =

Regions with significant populations
- India

Religion
- Islam

The Lalkhani are a Muslim Rajput community, found in North India. They are a sub-division of the Bargujar Rajput family who adopted Islam. The community is found mainly in the Uttar Pradesh districts of Aligarh, Hathras, Bulandshahr, and Badaun. The Lalkhani are said to have once held estates in the districts of Bulandshahr and some big Zamindari estates that belonged to the Lalkhani clan were Choundhera, Pindrawal, Sadabad, Danpur, Dharampur, Pahasu, Talibnagar and Chhatari.

From Lalkhani clan came Muhammad Ahmad Said Khan Chhatari "Nawab of Chhatri", a prominent All-India Muslim League politician, and the last Prime Minister of the Hyderabad State and Akhlaq Ahmad Khan author of "लालखानी बडगूजर राजपूतों की मुख्तसर तारीख].
