= Sarwan Khera =

- town
- Location in Uttar Pradesh, India Sarwan Khera (India)
- Coordinates: 26°20′54″N 80°6′12″E
- Country: India
- State: Uttar Pradesh
- District: Kanpur Dehat

Languages
  - Official: Hindi
- Time zone: UTC+5:30 (IST)
- Vehicle registration: UP-
- Coastline: 0 kilometres (0 mi)
- Website: up.gov.in

Sarwan Khera is a town in Kanpur Dehat district in the state of Uttar Pradesh, India approximately 20 kilometres (12 mi) south of Mati. The C A Kanpur Airport and Lalpur Railway Station are the closest mass transportation points. A public health clinic operated by the National Population Stabilisation Fund is located here.
