= Sarwankheda =

Sarwankheda village
- village
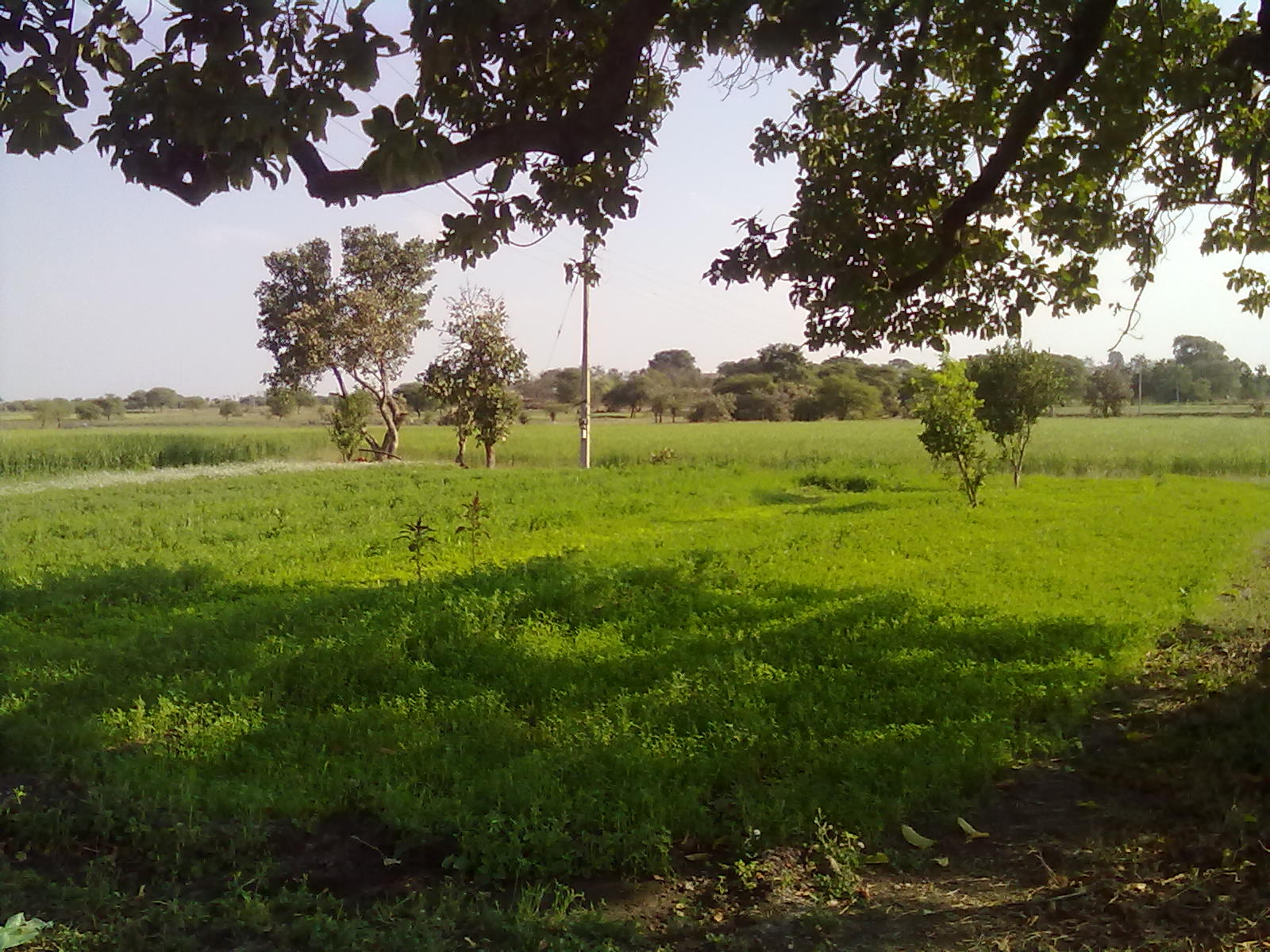
- A farm in the village

- Location in India Sarwankheda village (Madhya Pradesh)
- Coordinates: 23°34′.35″N 75°32′25″E
- Country: India
- State: Madhya Pradesh
- Region: Malwa
- District: Ujjain

Government
  - MLA: Bahadur Singh Chouhan (BJP)
  - Member of Parliament: Chintamani Malviya (BJP)

Population (2011)
  - Total: 780

Languages
  - Official: Hindi
  - Other: Malvi
- Time zone: UTC+5:30 (IST)
- Postal code: 456440
- Telephone code: 07365
- Vehicle registration: MP-13

Sarwankheda is a village in Barukhedi Gram Panchyat of Mahidpur Tehsil, Ujjain, Madhya Pradesh. It is located 4.6 km from Mehidpur Road near major town and railway station and 3.6 km from Mahidpur city highway.

As per census 2011, Sarwankheda population is 780 in which 391 were male and 389 were female.

== Schools ==
Sarwankheda village has two government schools:

- Primary school - up to 5th standard
- Middle school - up to 8th standard

=== Basic education ===
For the study of private schools, there are several primary schools in Mahidpur road as well as middle schools. Saraswati Vidya Mandir and Nehru School provide good education till 10th standard. There is a government school for 11th and 12th in PCM, PCB, Commerce and Arts subjects.

=== Higher education ===
Students go to Nagda and Mahidpur cities government and private colleges for more studies.ITI is a college here. All facilities are available in Ujjain district for technical and medical education or for various other types of courses and degrees.

== Temples ==
Sarvankheda has two fully built temples and two under construction.

- Hanuman temple - Located in the eastern corner of the village and near the main road of the village.
- Mata temple - When entering the village, there is a new temple of Durga Mata near the lake.
- Ram temple - Temple of Lord Rama, Sita and Lakshman ji is situated in the middle of the village.
- There are other smaller temples in different places in the village.

== Transport ==
=== Railway ===
The nearest railway station to travel by train is Mahindpur Road, where some trains stop and there is also reservation window. There is Nagda junction at a distance of 20 km to travel more distance, where a train is received from time to time for almost all major cities.

=== Bus ===
Mahindpur road, Nagda and Mahidpur city are main bus terminals, which connect all major cities.

=== Local ===
Most people like to use their vehicles for local transport. From time to time, Tata Magic meets on a reasonable fee for coming from village Mahindpur to the village from morning to evening.

== Agriculture ==
The family here mainly depends on the agriculture sector. Main crops of soybean and wheat are mainly seen in farmers' farms. Some crops in the village also grow gram, corn, and garlic. Farmers also cultivate crops as well as animal husbandry.

The village has a dam for irrigation, and there is also a small pond. Most farmers also have their own wells, bavaria and tube wells for irrigation.

== Climate ==
According to the climate, the village is similar to Central India. It has received average rainfall and 5 to 45 degree Celsius temperature.

== Banks ==
There is no branch of any bank in the village, but a nationalized bank in Mahindpur road nearby, Bank of India is available. Narmada Malwa Rural Bank is another co-operative bank is also here.

== Nearby villages ==
Sarvankheda is situated at a distance from the highway of Mahidpur city. To which Gogapur in the west, Barukhedi in the south, Tarnod in the east and Kankhedi village in the north direction, a paved road has been constructed from the village to reach all these villages.

== Photos ==
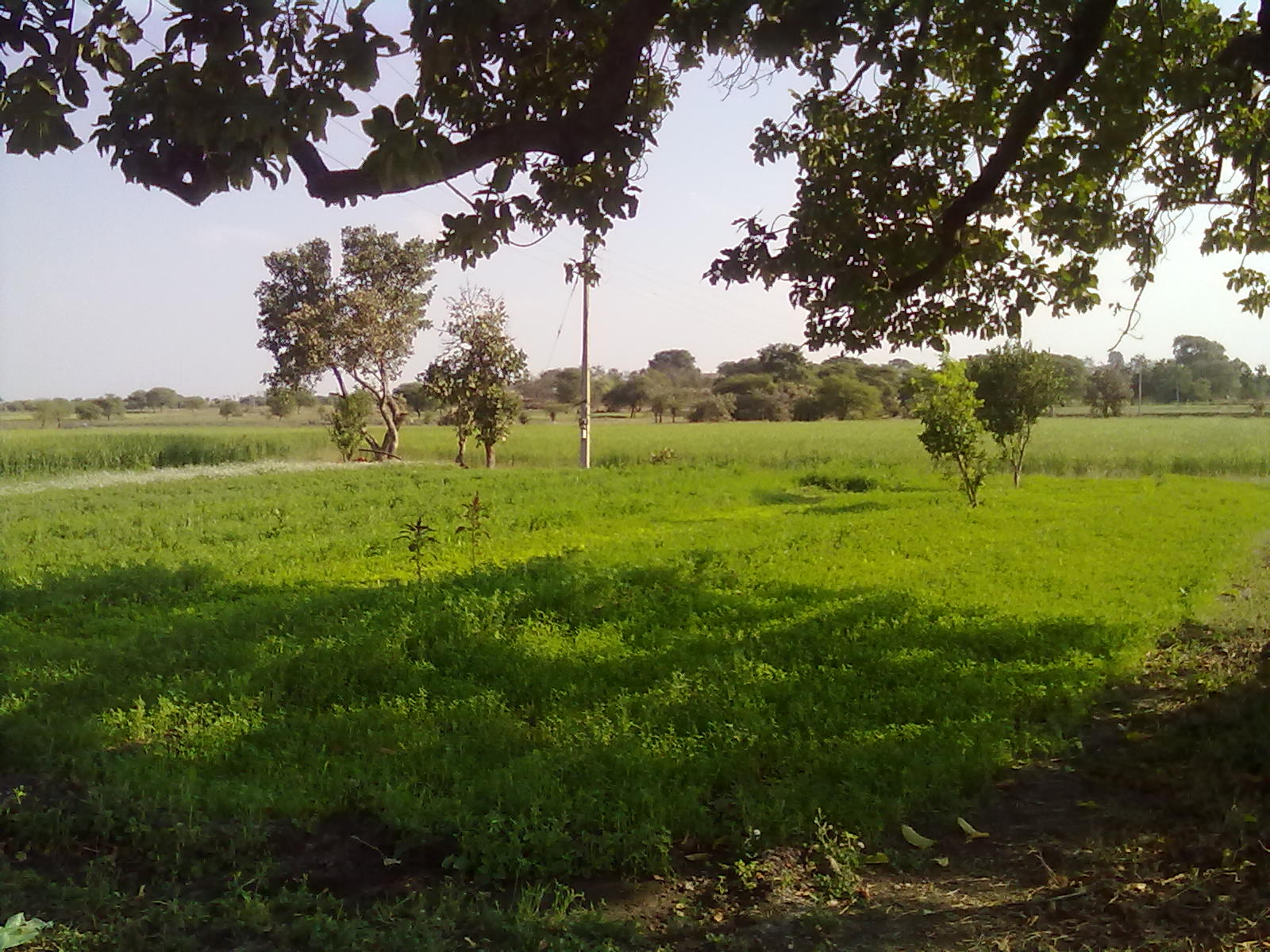
Crop in a village farm

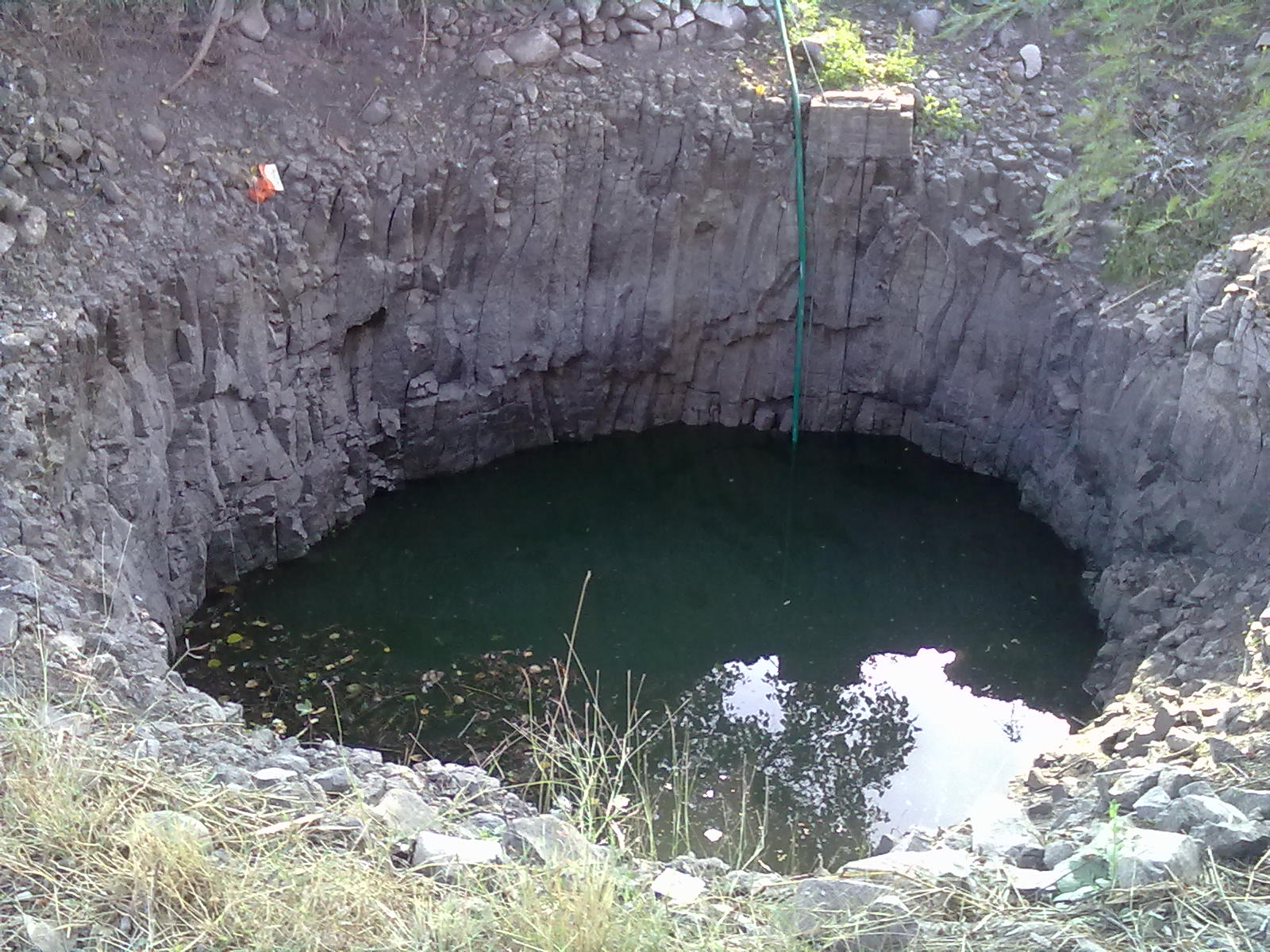
A well located in the village

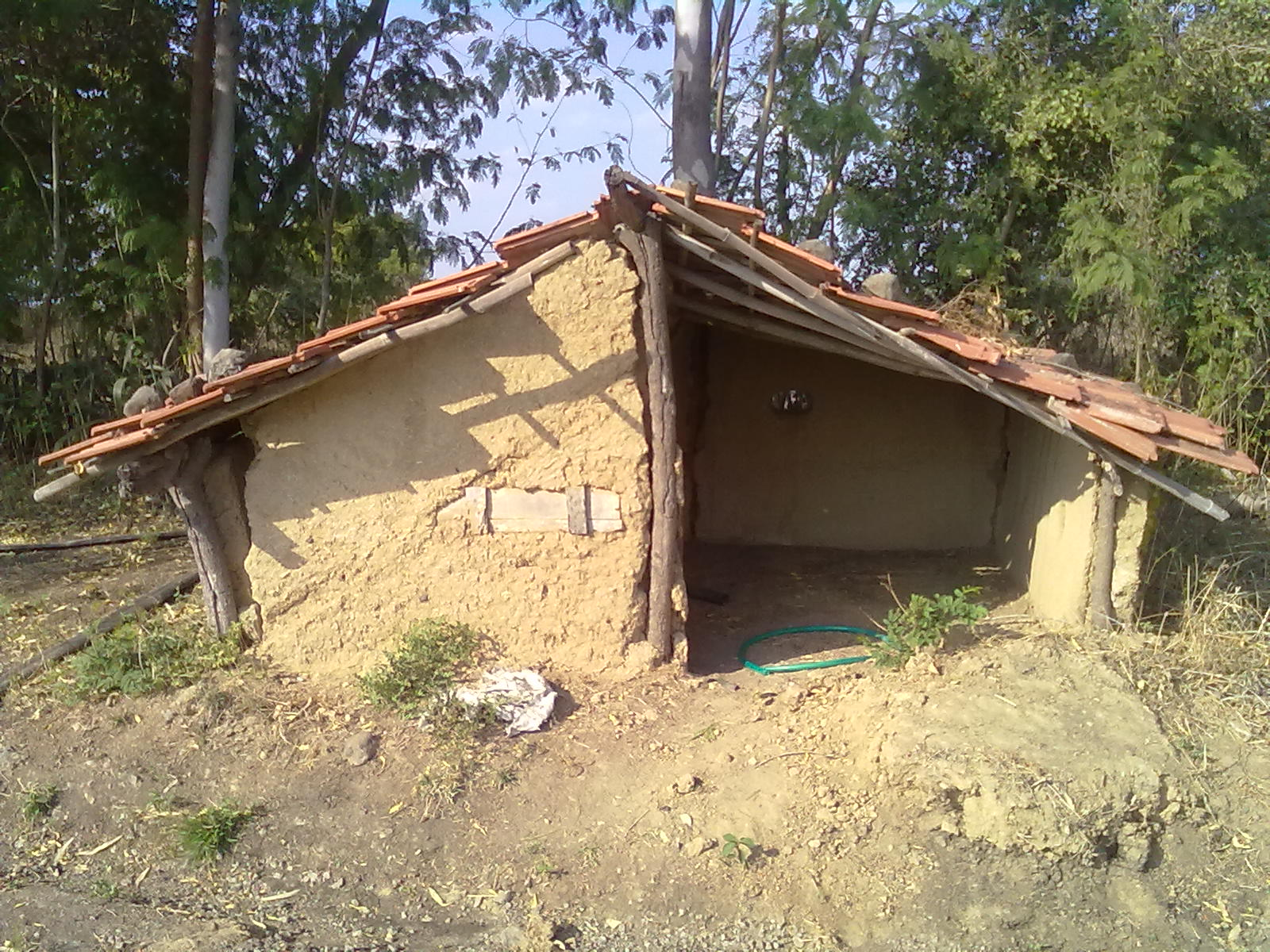
A hut built on a farm in the village

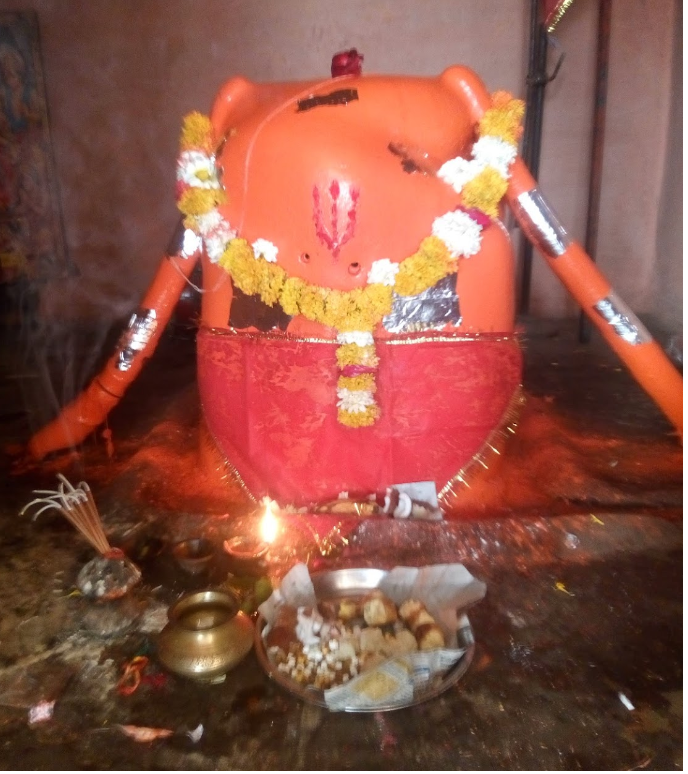
Hanumanji inside the temple

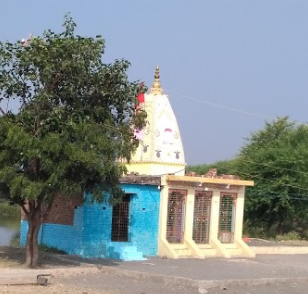
Temple of Mataji near the pond

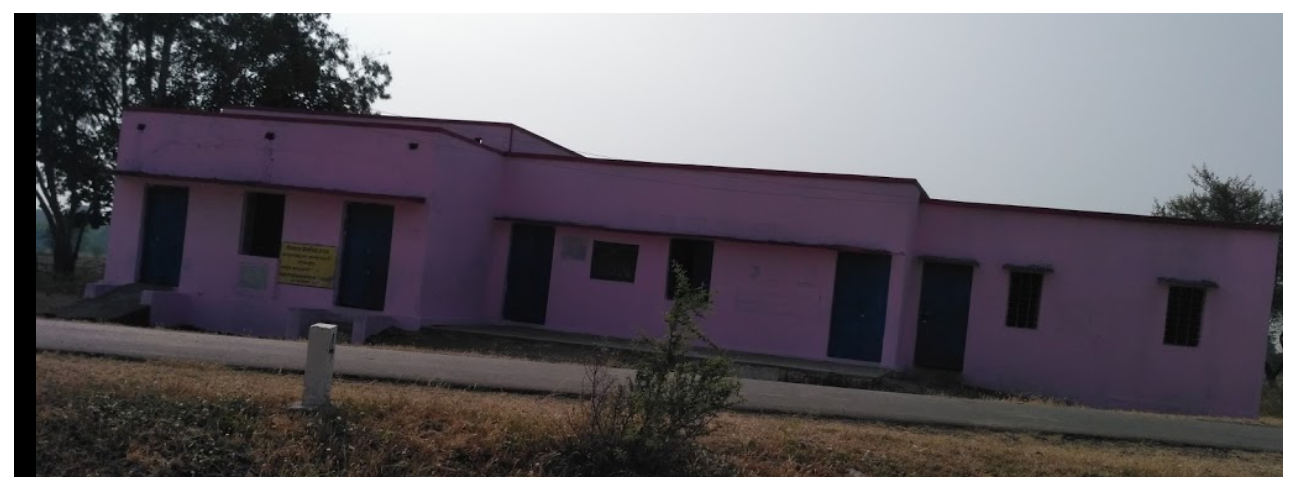
Outside the village a school

== See also ==
- Ujjain (Lok Sabha constituency)
- Nagda
- Mahidpur
- Mahidpur Road
