= Mehidpur Road =

Gogapur Mehidpur Road
- town
- Nicknames: Gogakheda, Mehidpur Mandi
- Location in Madhya Pradesh, India Gogapur (India)
- Coordinates: 23.55°N 75.52°E
- Country: India
- State: Madhya Pradesh
- District: Ujjain
- Elevation: 486 m (1,594 ft)

Population (2001)
  - Total: 6,371

Languages
  - Official: Hindi
- Time zone: UTC+5:30 (IST)
- ISO 3166 code: IN-MP
- Vehicle registration: MP13

Gogapur is a census town in tehsil Mehidpur City and Ujjain district in the Indian state of Madhya Pradesh.This town is commonly known as Mehidpur Road and Mehidpur Mandi.

== Geography ==
Gogapur is located at 23.55°N 75.52°E. It has an average elevation of 486 metres (1,594 feet).

== Demographics ==
As of 2001 India census, Gogapur had a population of 6,371. Males constitute 51% of the population and females 49%. Gogapur has an average literacy rate of 65%, higher than the national average of 59.5%: male literacy is 76%, and female literacy is 54%. In Gogapur, 16% of the population is under 6 years of age.

== Transport ==
=== Railway ===
Mahidpur Road is well connected to nearby major stations Nagda Ujjain and Ratlam Kota, which connect Delhi-Mumbai main line, Mumbai- New Delhi line via Kota Junction.

Train name (no.)	Arrives	Departs
Avadh Express (19038)	14:58	15:00
Jp Rtm Fastpass (59802)	10:26	10:28
Avadh Express (19040)	14:59	15:00
Avadh Express (19039)	11:10	11:12
Intercity Express (12416)	07:55	07:57
Nizamuddin Express (12415))	22:20	22:22
AFzr Janata Express (19023)	19:35	19:37
Dehradun Express (19019)	14:43	14:45
Fzr Bct Janta (19024)	04:13	04:15
Dehradun Express (19020)	12:28	12:30
Avadh Express (19037)	11:10	11:12

Jodhpur indore ranthambore exp

=== Road ===
Road is well connected to transport. Form Nagda 15 km, from Mahidpur city 19 km, from Ujjain District 72 km.a full AC bus started between mahidpur road to ujjain.
