= 16th Uttar Pradesh Assembly =

Legislative Assembly of Uttar Pradesh (2012-2017)

←	15th Uttar Pradesh Assembly	17th Uttar Pradesh Assembly	→

Overview
- Legislative body: Uttar Pradesh Legislative Assembly
- Meeting place: Vidhan Bhawan
- Term: March 2012 – March 2017
- Election: 2012 Uttar Pradesh Legislative Assembly election
- Government: Samajwadi Party
- Opposition: Bahujan Samaj Party
- Members: 404 (incl 1 nominated Anglo-Indian member)
- Chief Minister: Akhilesh Yadav
- Speaker of Assembly: Mata Prasad Pandey
- Leader of Opposition: Gaya Charan Dinkar
- Party control: Samajwadi Party

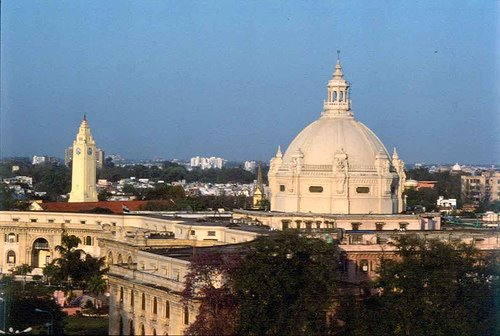
Vidhan Bhawan building in Lucknow.

The Sixteenth Legislative Assembly of Uttar Pradesh (a.k.a. Sixteenth Vidhan Sabha of Uttar Pradesh) was constituted on 15 March 2012 as a result of 2012 Uttar Pradesh Legislative Assembly election held between 8 Feb to 3 March 2012. The Sixteenth Legislative Assembly has total of 404 MLAs (including one nominated Anglo-Indian member) against a total strength of 404 members.

== Important members ==
#	From	To	Position	Name	Party
01	2012	2017	Chief Minister	Akhilesh Yadav	Samajwadi Party
02	2012	2017	Speaker	Mata Prasad Pandey	Samajwadi Party
03	2012	2017	Deputy Speaker	Vacant	-
04	2012	2017	Leader of the House	Akhilesh Yadav	Samajwadi Party
05	2012	2017	Leader of the Opposition	Gaya Charan Dinkar	Bahujan Samaj Party
06	2012	2017	Principal Secretary	Pradeep Kumar Dubey	-

== Party wise strength ==

Party	Mar 2012	Mar 2017	±
Samajwadi Party	224	229	+5
Bahujan Samaj Party	80	80	0
Bharatiya Janata Party	47	41	-6
Indian National Congress	28	29	1
Rashtriya Lok Dal	9	8	-1
Independent	6	6	0
Peace Party of India	4	4	0
Quami Ekta Dal	2	2	0
All India Trinamool Congress	0	1	+1
Apna Dal	1	1	0
Ittehad-e-Millat Council	1	1	0
Nationalist Congress Party	1	1	0
Nominated	1	1	0
Vacant	0	0	0
Total	404	404	0

^{[note]}

== Electors ==
	Male	Female	Others	Total
Electors	70,256,859	57,232,002	3,975	127,492,836
Electors who voted	41,225,412	34,500,316	65	75,725,793
Polling percentage	58.68%	60.28%	1.64%	59.40%

== Candidates ==
	Male	Female	Others	Total
Candidates	6,252	583	4	6,839
Elected	368	35	0	403
Forfeited deposits	5,269	487	4	5,760

== List of constituencies and elected members ==
Default sort, in alphabetical order of constituency. All members were elected in Mar 2012 and following list might undergo further changes due by-elections.

#	Assembly constituency	Name	Party	Reserved	ID ^{[note]}	District	LS constituency ^{[note]}	Comments
01	Agra Cantt.	Gutiyari Lal Duwesh	BSP	SC	87	Agra	Agra	
02	Agra North	Jagan Prasad Garg	BJP		89	Agra	Agra	
03	Agra Rural	Kali Charan Suman	BSP	SC	90	Agra	Fatehpur Sikri	
04	Agra South	Yogendra Upadhyaya	BJP		88	Agra	Agra	
05	Ajagara	Tribhuvan Ram	BSP	SC	385	Varanasi	Chandauli	
06	Akbarpur	Ram Murti Verma	SP		281	Ambedkar Nagar	Ambedkar Nagar	
07	Akbarpur - Raniya	Ram Swaroop Singh	SP		206	Kanpur Rural	Akbarpur	
08	Alapur	Bheem Prasad Sonkar	SP	SC	279	Ambedkar Nagar	Sant Kabir Nagar	
09	Aliganj	Rameshwar Singh Yadav	SP		103	Etah	Farrukhabad	
10	Aligarh	Zafar Alam	SP		76	Aligarh	Aligarh	
11	Allahabad North	Anugrah Narayan Singh	INC		262	Allahabad	Phulpur	
12	Allahabad South	Haji Parvej Ahmad (Tanki)	SP		263	Allahabad	Allahabad	
13	Allahabad West	Pooja Pal	BSP		261	Allahabad	Phulpur	
14	Amanpur	Mamtesh Shakya	BSP		101	Kasganj	Etah	
15	Amethi	Gayatri Prasad	SP		186	Amethi	Amethi	
16	Amritpur	Narendra Singh Yadav	SP		193	Farrukhabad	Farrukhabad	
17	Amroha	Mehboob Ali	SP		41	Amroha	Amroha	
18	Anupshahr	Gajendra Singh	BSP		67	Bulandshahar	Bulandshahr	
19	Aonla	Dharm Pal Singh	BJP		126	Bareilly	Aonla	
20	Arya Nagar	Salil Vishnoi	BJP		214	Kanpur Nagar	Kanpur	
21	Asmoli	Pinki Singh	SP		32	Moradabad	Sambhal	
22	Atrauli	Viresh Yadav	SP		73	Aligarh	Aligarh	
23	Atrauliya	Sangram Yadav	SP		343	Azamgarh	Lalganj	
24	Aurai	Madhubala	SP	SC	394	Sant Ravidas Nagar	Bhadohi	
25	Auraiya	Madan Singh	SP	SC	204	Auraiya	Etawah	
26	Ayah Shah	Ayodhya Prasad Pal	BSP		241	Fatehpur	Fatehpur	
27	Ayodhya	Tej Narayan Pandey	SP		275	Faizabad	Faizabad	
28	Azamgarh	Durga Prasad Yadav	SP		347	Azamgarh	Azamgarh	
29	Babaganj	Vinod Kumar	IND	SC	245	Pratapgarh	Kaushambi	
30	Baberu	Vishambhar Singh	SP		233	Banda	Banda	
31	Babina	Krishna Pal Singh Rajpoot	BSP		222	Jhansi	Jhansi	
32	Bachhrawan	Ram Lal Akela	SP	SC	177	Raebareli	Rae Bareli	
33	Badaun	Abid Raza Khan	SP		115	Budaun	Budaun	
34	Badlapur	Om Prakash 'Baba' Dubey	SP		364	Jaunpur	Jaunpur	
35	Bagpat	Hemlata Chaudhary	BSP		52	Bagpat	Bagpat	
36	Bah	Raja Mahendra Singh	SP		94	Agra	Fatehpur Sikri	
37	Baheri	Ataurrehman	SP		118	Bareilly	Pilibhit	
38	Bahraich	Waqar Ahmad Shah	SP		286	Bahraich	Bahraich	
39	Bairia	Jai Prakash Anchal	SP		363	Ballia	Ballia	
40	Bakshi Kaa Talab	Gomti Yadav	SP		169	Lucknow	Mohanlalganj	
41	Balamau	Anil Verma	SP	SC	160	Hardoi	Misrikh	
42	Baldev	Pooran Prakash	RLD	SC	85	Mathura	Mathura	
43	Balha	Bansidhar Bauddh	SP	SC	282	Bahraich	Bahraich	
44	Ballia Nagar	Narad Rai	SP		361	Ballia	Ballia	
45	Balrampur	Jagram Paswan	SP	SC	294	Balrampur	Shrawasti	
46	Banda	Vivek Kumar Singh	INC		235	Banda	Banda	
47	Bangarmau	Badlu Khan	SP		162	Unnao	Unnao	
48	Bansdih	Ram Govind	SP		362	Ballia	Salempur	
49	Bansgaon	Vijay Kumar	BSP	SC	327	Gorakhpur	Bansgaon	
50	Bansi	Jai Pratap Singh	BJP		304	Siddharth Nagar	Domariyaganj	
51	Bara	Ajay Kumar	SP	SC	264	Allahabad	Allahabad	
52	Barabanki	Dharam Raj	SP		268	Barabanki	Barabanki	
53	Barauli	Dalveer Singh	RLD		72	Aligarh	Aligarh	
54	Baraut	Lokesh Dixit	BSP		51	Bagpat	Bagpat	
55	Bareilly	Arun Kumar	BJP		124	Bareilly	Bareilly	
56	Bareilly Cantt.	Rajesh Agarwal	BJP		125	Bareilly	Bareilly	
57	Barhaj	Prem Prakash Singh	SP		342	Deoria	Bansgaon	
58	Barhapur	Mohammad Ghazi	BSP		19	Bijnor	Moradabad	
59	Barkhera	Hemraj Verma	SP		128	Pilibhit	Pilibhit	
60	Basti Sadar	Jeetendra Kumar	BSP		310	Basti	Basti	
61	Behat	Mahaveer Singh Rana	BSP		01	Saharanpur	Saharanpur	
62	Belthara Road	Gorakh Paswan	SP	SC	357	Ballia	Salempur	
63	Bhadohi	Jahid Beg	SP		392	Sant Ravidas Nagar	Bhadohi	
64	Bhagwantnagar	Kuldeep Singh Sengar	SP		166	Unnao	Unnao	
65	Bharthana	Sukh Devi Verma	SP	SC	201	Etawah	Etawah	
66	Bhatpar Rani	Ashutosh Upadhyay	SP		340	Deoria	Salempur	
67	Bhinga	Indrani Devi	SP		289	Shrawasti	Shrawasti	
68	Bhognipur	Yogendra Pal Singh	SP		208	Kanpur Rural	Jalaun	
69	Bhojipura	Shazil Islam Ansari	IEMC		120	Bareilly	Bareilly	
70	Bhojpur	Jamaluddin Siddiqui	SP		195	Farrukhabad	Farrukhabad	
71	Bhongaon	Alok Kumar	SP		108	Mainpuri	Mainpuri	
72	Bidhuna	Pramod Kumar	SP		202	Auraiya	Kannauj	
73	Bijnor	Kunwar Bhartendra Singh	BJP		22	Bijnor	Bijnor	Elected to 16th Lok Sabha in May 2014
73	Bijnor	Ruchi Veera	SP		22	Bijnor	Bijnor	Elected during by-election
74	Bikapur	Mitrasen Yadav	SP					
74	Bikapur	Anandsen Yadav	SP					
75	Bilari	Mohammad Irfan	SP		30	Moradabad	Sambhal	Died on 10 Mar 16.
75	Bilari	Mohammad Faeem	SP		30	Moradabad	Sambhal	Elected during by-election
76	Bilaspur	Sanjay Kapoor	INC		36	Rampur	Rampur	
77	Bilgram-Mallanwan	Brijesh Kumar	BSP		159	Hardoi	Misrikh	
78	Bilhaur	Aruna Kumari Kori	SP	SC	209	Kanpur	Misrikh	
79	Bilsi	Musarrat Ali Bittan	BSP		114	Budaun	Budaun	
80	Bindki	Sukhadev Prasad Verma	BSP		239	Fatehpur	Fatehpur	
81	Bisalpur	Agys Ramsaran Verma	BJP		130	Pilibhit	Pilibhit	
82	Bisauli	Ashutosh Maurya	SP	SC	112	Budaun	Budaun	
83	Biswan	Rampal Yadav	SP		149	Sitapur	Sitapur	
84	Vishwanathganj	Rakesh Kumar Verma	SP		247	Pratapgarh	Pratapgarh	
85	Bithari Chainpur	Virendra Singh	BSP		123	Bareilly	Aonla	
86	Bithoor	Munindra Shukla	SP		210	Kanpur Nagar	Akbarpur	
87	Budhana	Nawazish Alam Khan	SP		11	Muzaffarnagar	Muzaffarnagar	
88	Bulandshahr	Mohd. Aleem Khan	BSP		65	Bulandshahar	Bulandshahr	
89	Caimpiyarganj	Fateh Bahadur	NCP		320	Gorakhpur	Gorakhpur	
90	Chail	Mohd Ashif Jafri	BSP		253	Kaushambi	Kaushambi	
91	Chakia	Poonam	SP	SC	383	Chandauli	Robertsganj	
92	Chamraua	Ali Yusuf Ali	BSP		35	Rampur	Rampur	
93	Chandausi	Laxmi Gautam	SP	SC	31	Sambhal	Sambhal	
94	Chandpur	Iqbal	BSP		23	Bijnor	Bijnor	
95	Charkhari	Urmila Devi	SP		231	Mahoba	Hamirpur	
96	Charthawal	Noor Saleem Rana	BSP		12	Muzaffarnagar	Muzaffarnagar	
97	Chauri-Chaura	Jay Prakash	BSP		326	Gorakhpur	Bansgaon	
98	Chhanbey	Bhai Lal Kol	SP		395	Mirzapur	Mirzapur	
99	Chhaprauli	Vir Pal	RLD		50	Bagpat	Bagpat	
100	Chharra	Rakesh Kumar	SP		74	Aligarh	Hathras	
101	Chhata	Tejpal Singh	RLD		81	Mathura	Mathura	
102	Chhibramau	Arvind Singh Yadav	SP		196	Kannauj	Kannauj	
103	Chillupar	Rajesh Tripathi	BSP		328	Gorakhpur	Bansgaon	
104	Chitrakoot	Veer Singh	SP		236	Chitrakoot	Banda	
105	Chunar	Jagatamba Singh	SP		398	Mirzapur	Mirzapur	
106	Colonelganj	Yogesh Pratap Singh	SP		298	Gonda	Kaiserganj	
107	Dadraul	Rammurti Singh Verma	SP		136	Shahjahanpur	Shahjahanpur	
108	Dadri	Satveer Singh Gurjar	BSP		62	Gautam Budh Nagar	Gautam Buddha Nagar	
109	Dariyabad	Rajeev Kumar Singh	SP		270	Barabanki	Faizabad	
110	Dataganj	Sinod Kumar Shakya	BSP		117	Budaun	Aonla	
111	Debai	Shri Bhagwan Sharma	SP		68	Bulandshahr	Bulandshahr	
112	Deoband	Rajendra Singh Rana	SP		05	Saharanpur	Saharanpur	Rana died on 27 Oct 15
112	Deoband	Maviya Ali	INC		05	Saharanpur	Saharanpur	Elected during by-election
113	Deoria	Janmejai Singh	BJP		337	Deoria	Deoria	
114	Dhampur	Thakur Mool Chand Chauhan	SP		20	Bijnor	Nagina	
115	Dhanaura	Maikal Chandra	SP	SC	39	Amroha	Amroha	
116	Dhanghata	Alagu Prasad Chauhan	SP	SC	314	Sant Kabir Nagar	Sant Kabir Nagar	
117	Dhaurahra	Shamsher Bahadur	BSP		141	Lakhimpur Kheri	Dhaurahra	
118	Dholana	Dharmesh Singh Tomar	SP		58	Hapur	Ghaziabad	
119	Dibiyapur	Pradeep Kumar	SP		203	Auraiya	Etawah	
120	Didarganj	Adil Sheikh	SP		350	Azamgarh	Lalganj	
121	Domariyaganj	Kamal Yusuf Malik	PECP		306	Siddharth Nagar	Domariyaganj	
122	Duddhi	Rubi Prasad	IND	SC	403	Sonbhadra	Robertsganj	
123	Etah	Ashish Kumar Yadav	SP		104	Etah	Etah	
124	Etawah	Raghuraj Singh Shakya	SP		200	Etawah	Etawah	
125	Etmadpur	Dharampal Singh	BSP		86	Agra	Agra	
126	Faridpur	Siyaram Sagar	SP	SC	122	Bareilly	Aonla	
127	Farrukhabad	Vijay Singh	IND		194	Farrukhabad	Farrukhabad	
128	Fatehabad	Chotelal Verma	BSP		93	Agra	Fatehpur Sikri	
129	Fatehpur	Syed Qasim Hasan	SP		240	Fatehpur	Fatehpur	Died on 31.12.13
129	Fatehpur	Vikram Singh	BJP		240	Fatehpur	Fatehpur	Elected during by-election
130	Fatehpur Sikri	Surajpal Singh	BSP		91	Agra	Fatehpur Sikri	
131	Fazilnagar	Ganga	BJP		332	Kushinagar	Deoria	
132	Firozabad	Manish Asiza	BJP		97	Firozabad	Firozabad	
133	Gainsari	Shiv Pratap Yadav	SP		292	Balrampur	Shrawasti	
134	Gangoh	Pradeep Choudhary	INC		07	Saharanpur	Kairana	
135	Garautha	Deepnarayan Singh	SP		225	Jhansi	Jalaun	
136	Garhmukteshwar	Madan Chauhan	SP		60	Hapur	Amroha	
137	Gaura	Kunwar Anand Singh	SP		301	Gonda	Gonda	
138	Gauriganj	Rakesh Pratap Singh	SP		185	Amethi	Amethi	
139	Ghatampur	Indrajeet Kori	SP	SC	218	Kanpur	Akbarpur	
140	Ghaziabad	Suresh Bansal	BSP		56	Ghaziabad	Ghaziabad	
141	Ghazipur	Vijay Kumar Mishra	SP		375	Ghazipur	Ghazipur	
142	Ghorawal	Ramesh Chandra Dubey	SP		400	Sonbhadra	Robertsganj	
143	Ghosi	Sudhakar	SP		354	Mau	Ghosi	
144	Gola Gokrannath	Vinay Tiwari	SP		139	Lakhimpur Kheri	Kheri	
145	Gonda	Vinod Kumar	SP		296	Gonda	Gonda	
146	Gopalpur	Waseem Ahmad	SP		344	Azamgarh	Azamgarh	
147	Gopamau	Shyam Prakash	SP	SC	157	Hardoi	Hardoi	
148	Gorakhpur Rural	Vijay Bahadur Yadava	BJP		323	Gorakhpur	Gorakhpur	
149	Gorakhpur Urban	Radha Mohan Das Agarwal	BJP		322	Gorakhpur	Gorakhpur	
150	Goshainganj	Abhay Singh	SP		276	Faizabad	Ambedkar Nagar	
151	Goverdhan	Rajkumar Rawat	BSP		83	Mathura	Mathura	
152	Govindnagar	Satyadev Pachauri	BJP		212	Kanpur Nagar	Kanpur	
153	Gunnaur	Ramkhiladi Singh Yadav	SP		111	Budaun	Budaun	
154	Gyanpur	Vijay Kumar	SP		393	Sant Ravidas Nagar	Bhadohi	
155	Haidergarh	Ram Magan	SP	SC	272	Barabanki	Barabanki	
156	Hamirpur	Shivcharan Prajapati	SP		228	Hamirpur	Hamirpur	
157	Handia	Mahesh Narayan Singh	SP		258	Allahabad	Bhadohi	
158	Hapur	Gajraj Singh	INC	SC	59	Hapur	Meerut	
159	Harchandpur	Surendra Vikram Singh	SP		179	Raebareli	Rae Bareli	
160	Hardoi	Nitin Agrawal	SP		156	Hardoi	Hardoi	
161	Hargaon	Ramhet Bharti	BSP	SC	147	Sitapur	Dhaurahra	
162	Harraiya	Raj kishor Singh	SP		307	Basti	Basti	
163	Hasanpur	Kamal Akhtar	SP		42	Amroha	Amroha	
164	Hastinapur	Prabhu Dayal Balmiki	SP	SC	45	Meerut	Bijnor	
165	Hata	Radheshyam	SP		334	Kushinagar	Kushinagar	
166	Hathras	Genda Lal Chaudhary	BSP	SC	78	Hathras	Hathras	
167	Husainganj	Mo. Asif	BSP		242	Fatehpur	Fatehpur	
168	Iglas	Triloki Ram	RLD	SC	77	Aligarh	Hathras	
169	Isauli	Abrar Ahmad	SP		187	Sultanpur	Sultanpur	
170	Itwa	Mata Prasad Pandey	SP		305	Siddharth Nagar	Domariyaganj	
171	Jagdishpur	Radhey Shyam	INC	SC	184	Amethi	Amethi	
172	Jahanabad	Madan Gopal Verma	SP		238	Fatehpur	Fatehpur	
173	Jakhanian	Subba Ram	SP	SC	373	Ghazipur	Ghazipur	
174	Jalalabad	Neeraj Kushawaha	BSP		132	Shahjahanpur	Shahjahanpur	
175	Jalalpur	Sher Bahadur	SP		280	Ambedkar Nagar	Ambedkar Nagar	
176	Jalesar	Ranjeet Suman	SP	SC	106	Etah	Agra	
177	Jangipur	Kailash Yadav	SP		376	Ghazipur	Ghazipur	Died on 9 Feb 16
177	Jangipur	Kismatiya	SP		376	Ghazipur	Ghazipur	Elected during by-election
178	Jasrana	Ramveer Singh	SP		96	Firozabad	Firozabad	
179	Jaswantnagar	Shivpal Singh Yadav	SP		199	Etawah	Mainpuri	
180	Jaunpur	Nadeem Javed	INC		366	Jaunpur	Jaunpur	
181	Jewar	Vedram Bhati	BSP		63	Gautam Budh Nagar	Gautam Buddha Nagar	
182	Jhansi Nagar	Ravi Sharma	BJP		223	Jhansi	Jhansi	
183	Kadipur	Ramchandra Chaudhary	SP	SC	191	Sultanpur	Sultanpur	
184	Kaimganj	Ajit Kumar	SP	SC	192	Farrukhabad	Farrukhabad	
185	Kairana	Hukum Singh	BJP		08	Shamli	Kairana	Elected to 16th Lok Sabha in May 2014
185	Kairana	Nahid Hasan	SP		08	Shamli	Kairana	Elected during by-election
186	Kaiserganj	Mukut Bihari	BJP		288	Bahraich	Kaiserganj	
187	Kalpi	Umakanti	INC		220	Jalaun	Jalaun	
188	Kalyanpur	Satish Kumar Nigam	SP		211	Kanpur	Akbarpur	
189	Kannauj	Anil Kumar Dohre	SP	SC	198	Kannauj	Kannauj	
190	Kanpur Cantt.	Raghunandan Singh Bhadauria	BJP		216	Kanpur	Kanpur	
191	Kanth	Aneesurrehman	PECP		25	Moradabad	Moradabad	
192	Kapilvastu	Vijay Kumar	SP	SC	303	Siddharth Nagar	Domariyaganj	
193	Kaptanganj	Ram Prasad Chaudhary	BSP		308	Basti	Basti	
194	Karachhana	Deepak Patel	BSP		260	Allahabad	Allahabad	
195	Karhal	Sobaran Singh Yadav	SP		110	Mainpuri	Mainpuri	
196	Kasganj	Manpal Singh	SP		100	Kasganj	Etah	
197	Kasta	Sunil Kumar Lala	SP	SC	143	Lakhimpur Kheri	Dhaurahra	
198	Katehari	Shankh Lal Manjhi	SP		277	Ambedkar Nagar	Ambedkar Nagar	
199	Katra	Rajesh Yadav	SP		131	Shahjahanpur	Shahjahanpur	
200	Katra Bazar	Bawan Singh	BJP		297	Gonda	Kaiserganj	
201	Kerakat	Gulab Chand	SP	SC	372	Jaunpur	Machhlishahr	
202	Khadda	Vijay Kumar Dubey	INC		329	Kushinagar	Kushinagar	
203	Khaga	Krishna Paswan	BJP	SC	243	Fatehpur	Fatehpur	
204	Khair	Bhagwati Prasad	RLD	SC	71	Aligarh	Aligarh	
205	Khajani	Sant Prasad	BJP	SC	325	Gorakhpur	Sant Kabir Nagar	
206	Khalilabad	Mohamed Ayub	PECP		313	Sant Kabir Nagar	Sant Kabir Nagar	
207	Khatauli	Kartar Singh Bhadana	RLD		15	Muzaffarnagar	Muzaffarnagar	
208	Kheragarh	Bhagvan Singh Kushwaha	BSP		92	Agra	Fatehpur Sikri	
209	Khurja	Banshi Singh Pahadiya	INC	SC	70	Bulandshahr	Gautam Buddha Nagar	
210	Kidwai Nagar	Ajay Kapoor	INC		215	Kanpur	Kanpur	
211	Kishni	Brajesh Katheriya	SP	SC	109	Mainpuri	Mainpuri	
212	Kithore	Shahid Manzoor	SP		46	Meerut	Meerut	
213	Koil	Zameer Ullah Khan	SP		75	Aligarh	Aligarh	
214	Koraon	Rajbali Jaisal	BSP	SC	265	Allahabad	Allahabad	
215	Kunda	Raghuraj Pratap Singh	IND		246	Pratapgarh	Kaushambi	
216	Kundarki	Mohammad Rizwan	SP		29	Moradabad	Sambhal	
217	Kursi	Fareed Mahfooj Kidwai	SP		266	Barabanki	Barabanki	
218	Kushinagar	Bramhashankar Tripathi	SP		333	Kushinagar	Kushinagar	
219	Laharpur	Mohammad Jasmir Ansari	BSP		148	Sitapur	Sitapur	
220	Lakhimpur	Utkarsh Verma	SP		142	Lakhimpur Kheri	Kheri	
221	Lalganj	Bechai Saroj	SP	SC	351	Azamgarh	Lalganj	
222	Lalitpur	Ramesh Prasad Kushwaha	BSP		226	Lalitpur	Jhansi	
223	Lambhua	Santosh Pandey	SP		190	Sultanpur	Sultanpur	
224	Loni	Zakir Ali	BSP		53	Ghaziabad	Ghaziabad	
225	Lucknow Cantt.	Rita Bahuguna Joshi	INC		175	Lucknow	Lucknow	
226	Lucknow Central	Ravidas Mehrotra	SP		174	Lucknow	Lucknow	
227	Lucknow East	Ashutosh Tandon	BJP		173	Lucknow	Lucknow	
228	Lucknow North	Abhishek Mishra	SP		172	Lucknow	Lucknow	
229	Lucknow West	Mohd Rehan	SP		171	Lucknow	Lucknow	
230	Machhlishahr	Jagdish Sonkar	SP	SC	369	Jaunpur	Machhlishahr	
231	Madhaugarh	Santram	BSP		219	Jalaun	Jalaun	
232	Madhuban	Umesh Pandey	BSP		353	Mau	Ghosi	
233	Mahadewa	Ram Karan Arya	SP	SC	311	Basti	Basti	
234	Maharajganj	Sudama Prasad	SP	SC	318	Maharajganj	Maharajganj	
235	Maharajpur	Satish Mahana	BJP		217	Kanpur Nagar	Akbarpur	
236	Mahasi	Krishna Kumar Ojha	BSP		285	Bahraich	Bahraich	
237	Mahmoodabad	Narendra Singh Verma	SP		151	Sitapur	Sitapur	
238	Mahoba	Rajnarain	BSP		230	Mahoba	Hamirpur	
239	Maholi	Anoop Kumar Gupta	SP		145	Sitapur	Dhaurahra	
240	Mainpuri	Raju Yadav	SP		107	Mainpuri	Mainpuri	
241	Majhawan	Ramesh Chand	BSP		397	Mirzapur	Mirzapur	
242	Malhani	Paras Nath Yadaw	SP		367	Jaunpur	Jaunpur	
243	Malihabad	Indal Kumar	SP	SC	168	Lucknow	Mohanlalganj	
244	Manikpur	Chandrabhan Singh Patel	BSP		237	Chitrakoot	Banda	
245	Manjhanpur	Indrajeet Saroj	BSP	SC	252	Kaushambi	Kaushambi	
246	Mankapur	Babulal	SP	SC	300	Gonda	Gonda	
247	Mant	Jayant Chaudhary	RLD		82	Mathura	Mathura	
247	Mant	Shyam Sunder Sharma	TMC		82	Mathura	Mathura	Elected during by-election
248	Marhara	Amit Gaurav	SP		105	Etah	Etah	
249	Madihan	Laliteshpati Tripathi	INC		399	Mirzapur	Mirzapur	
250	Mariyahu	Shraddha Yadav	SP		370	Jaunpur	Machhlishahr	
251	Matera	Yasar Shah	SP		284	Bahraich	Bahraich	
252	Mathura	Pradeep Mathur	INC		84	Mathura	Mathura	
253	Mau	Mukhtar Ansari	QED		356	Mau	Ghosi	
254	Mauranipur	Rashmi Arya	SP	SC	224	Jhansi	Jhansi	
255	Meerapur	Jamil Ahmad Qasmi	BSP		16	Muzaffarnagar	Bijnor	
256	Meerganj	Sultan Baig	BSP		119	Bareilly	Bareilly	
257	Meerut	Laxmikant Bajpai	BJP		48	Meerut	Meerut	
258	Meerut Cantt.	Satya Prakash Agarwal	BJP		47	Meerut	Meerut	
259	Meerut South	Ravindra Kumar Bhadana	BJP		49	Meerut	Meerut	
260	Mehnagar	Brij Lal Sonkar	SP	SC	352	Azamgarh	Azamgarh	
261	Mehnaun	Nandita Shukla	SP		295	Gonda	Gonda	
262	Mehroni	Feran Lal	BSP	SC	227	Lalitpur	Jhansi	
263	Meja	Girish Chandra	SP		259	Allahabad	Allahabad	
264	Menhdawal	Laxmikant	SP		312	Sant Kabir Nagar	Sant Kabir Nagar	
265	Milak	Vijay Singh	SP	SC	38	Rampur	Rampur	
266	Milkipur	Audhesh Prasad	SP	SC	273	Faizabad	Faizabad	
267	Mirzapur	Kailash Nath Chaurasiya	SP		396	Mirzapur	Mirzapur	
268	Misrikh	Ram Pal Rajwanshi	SP	SC	153	Sitapur	Misrikh	
269	Modinagar	Sudesh Sharma	RLD		57	Ghaziabad	Bagpat	
270	Mohammadabad	Sibgatulla Ansari	QED		378	Ghazipur	Ballia	
271	Mohammdi	Awasthi Bala Prasad	BSP		144	Lakhimpur Kheri	Dhaurahra	
272	Mohan	Radhey Lal Rawat	BSP	SC	164	Unnao	Unnao	
273	Mohanlalganj	Chandra Rawat	SP	SC	176	Lucknow	Mohanlalganj	
274	Moradabad Nagar	Mohammad Yusuf Ansari	SP		28	Moradabad	Moradabad	
275	Moradabad Rural	Shameemul Haq	SP		27	Moradabad	Moradabad	
276	Mubarakpur	Shah Alam (Guddu Jamali)	BSP		346	Azamgarh	Azamgarh	
277	Mughalsarai	Babban	BSP		380	Chandauli	Chandauli	
278	Muhammadabad- Gohna (SC)	Baijnath	SP	SC	355	Mau	Ghosi	
279	Mungra Badshahpur	Seema	BJP		368	Jaunpur	Jaunpur	
280	Muradnagar	Wahab Chaudhary	BSP		54	Ghaziabad	Ghaziabad	
281	Muzaffarnagar	Chitranjan Swaroop	SP		14	Muzaffarnagar	Muzaffarnagar	Died on 19 Aug 15.
281	Muzaffarnagar	Kapil Deo Agarwal	BJP		14	Muzaffarnagar	Muzaffarnagar	Elected during by-election
282	Nagina	Manoj Kumar Paras	SP	SC	18	Bijnor	Nagina	
283	Najibabad	Tasleem	BSP		17	Bijnor	Nagina	
284	Nakur	Dharam Singh Saini	BSP		02	Saharanpur	Kairana	
285	Nanpara	Madhuri Verma	INC		283	Bahraich	Bahraich	
286	Naraini	Gayacharan Dinkar	BSP	SC	234	Banda	Banda	
287	Naugawan Sadat	Ashfaq Ali Khan	SP		40	Amroha	Amroha	
288	Nautanwa	Kaushal Kishor	INC		316	Maharajganj	Maharajganj	
289	Nawabganj	Bhagwat Saran Gangwar	SP		121	Bareilly	Bareilly	
290	Nehtaur	Om Kumar	BSP	SC	21	Bijnor	Nagina	
291	Nighasan	Ajay Kumar Mishra	BJP		138	Lakhimpur Kheri	Kheri	Elected to 16th Lok Sabha in May 2014
291	Nighasan	Krishna Gopal Patel	SP		138	Lakhimpur Kheri	Kheri	Elected during by-election
292	Nizamabad	Alambadi	SP		348	Azamgarh	Lalganj	
293	Noida	Mahesh Sharma	BJP		61	Gautam Budh Nagar	Gautam Buddha Nagar	Elected to 16th Lok Sabha in May 2014
293	Noida	Bilma Batham	BJP		61	Gautam Budh Nagar	Gautam Buddha Nagar	Elected during by-election
294	Noorpur	Lokendra Singh	BJP		24	Bijnor	Nagina	
295	Obra	Sunil Kumar	BSP		402	Sonbhadra	Robertsganj	
296	Orai	Dayashankar	SP	SC	221	Jalaun	Jalaun	
297	Padrauna	Swami Prasad Maurya	BSP		330	Kushinagar	Kushinagar	
298	Palia	Harvindar Kumar Sahani	BSP		137	Lakhimpur Kheri	Kheri	
299	Paniyara	Deo Narayan	BSP		319	Mahrajganj	Maharajganj	
300	Pathardeva	Shakir Ali	SP		338	Deoria	Deoria	
301	Patiyali	Najeeva Khan Zeenat	SP		102	Kasganj	Etah	
302	Patti	Ram Singh	SP		249	Pratapgarh	Pratapgarh	
303	Payagpur	Mukesh Srivastva	INC		287	Bahraich	Kaiserganj	
304	Phaphamau	Ansar Ahmad	SP		254	Allahabad	Phulpur	
305	Pharenda	Vinod Tiwari	BJP		315	Maharajganj	Maharajganj	
306	Phephana	Upendra Tiwari	BJP		360	Ballia	Ballia	
307	Phoolpur Pawai	Shyam Bahadur Singh Yadav	SP		349	Azamgarh	Lalganj	
308	Phulpur	Sayeed Ahamad	SP		256	Allahabad	Phulpur	
309	Pilibhit	Riaz Ahmad	SP		127	Pilibhit	Pilibhit	
310	Pindra	Ajay	INC		384	Varanasi	Machhlishahr	
311	Pipraich	Rajmati	SP		321	Gorakhpur	Gorakhpur	
312	Powayan	Sakuntla Devi	SP	SC	134	Shahjahanpur	Shahjahanpur	
313	Pratapgarh	Nagendra Singh	SP		248	Pratapgarh	Pratapgarh	
314	Pratappur	Vijma Yadav	SP		257	Allahabad	Bhadohi	
315	Puranpur	Peetam Ram	SP	SC	129	Pilibhit	Pilibhit	
316	Purqazi	Anil Kumar	BSP	SC	13	Muzaffarnagar	Bijnor	
317	Purwa	Uday Raj	SP		167	Unnao	Unnao	
318	Rae Bareli	Akhilesh Kumar Singh	PECP		180	Rae Bareli	Rae Bareli	
319	Ram Nagar	Arvind Kumar Singh 'Gop'	SP		267	Barabanki	Barabanki	
320	Ramkola	Purnmasi Dehati	SP	SC	335	Kushinagar	Kushinagar	
321	Rampur	Mohammad Azam Khan	SP		37	Rampur	Rampur	
322	Rampur Karkhana	Ghazala Lari	SP		339	Deoria	Deoria	
323	Rampur Khas	Pramod Kumar	INC		244	Pratapgarh	Pratapgarh	
324	Rampur Maniharan	Ravinder Kumar Molhu	BSP	SC	06	Saharanpur	Saharanpur	
325	Raniganj	Shivakant Ojha	SP		250	Pratapgarh	Pratapgarh	
326	Rasara	Umashankar	BSP		358	Ballia	Ghosi	
327	Rasulabad	Shiv Kumar Beria	SP	SC	205	Kanpur Rural	Kannauj	
328	Rath	Gayadeen Anuragi	INC	SC	229	Hamirpur	Hamirpur	
329	Robertsganj	Avinash Kushwaha	SP		401	Sonbhadra	Robertsganj	
330	Rohaniya	Anupriya Patel	AD		387	Varanasi	Varanasi	Elected to 16th Lok Sabha in May 2014
330	Rohaniya	Mahendra Singh Patel	SP		387	Varanasi	Varanasi	Elected during by-election in 2014
331	Rudauli	Ram Chandra Yadav	BJP		271	Faizabad		
332	Rudhauli	Sanjay Pratap Jaiswal	INC		309	Basti	Basti	
333	Rudrapur	Akhilesh Pratap Singh	INC		336	Deoria	Bansgaon	
334	Sadabad	Devendra Agrawal	SP		79	Hathras	Hathras	
335	Sadar	Arun Kumar	SP		189	Sultanpur	Sultanpur	
336	Safipur	Sudhir Kumar	SP	SC	163	Unnao	Unnao	
337	Sagri	Abhay Narayan	SP		345	Azamgarh	Azamgarh	
338	Sahajanwa	Rajendra	BSP		324	Gorakhpur	Gorakhpur	
339	Saharanpur	Jagpal	BSP	SC	04	Saharanpur	Saharanpur	
340	Saharanpur Nagar	Raghav Lakhanpal	BJP		03	Saharanpur	Saharanpur	Elected to 16th Lok Sabha in May 2014
340	Saharanpur Nagar	Rajiv Gumbar	BJP		03	Saharanpur	Saharanpur	Elected during by-election
341	Sahaswan	Omkar Singh	SP		113	Budaun	Budaun	
342	Sahibabad	Amarpal Sharma	BSP		55	Ghaziabad	Ghaziabad	
343	Saidpur	Subhash Pasi	SP	SC	374	Ghazipur	Ghazipur	
344	Saiyadraja	Manoj Kumar	IND		382	Chandauli	Chandauli	
345	Sakaldiha	Sushil Singh	IND		381	Chandauli	Chandauli	
346	Salempur	Manbodh Prasad	SP	SC	341	Deoria	Salempur	
347	Salon	Ashakishore	SP	SC	181	Raebareli	Amethi	
348	Sambhal	Iqbal Mehmood	SP		33	Moradabad	Sambhal	
349	Sandi	Rajeshwari	SP	SC	158	Hardoi		
350	Sandila	Kunwar Mahabir Singh	SP		161	Hardoi	Misrikh	
351	Sardhana	Sangeet Singh Som	BJP		44	Meerut	Muzaffarnagar	
352	Sareni	Devendra Pratap Singh	SP		182	Raebareli	Rae Bareli	
353	Sarojini Nagar	Sharda Pratap Shukla	SP		170	Lucknow	Mohanlalganj	
354	Sawayazpur	Rajani Tiwari	BSP		154	Hardoi	Hardoi	
355	Sevapuri	Surendra Singh Patel	SP		391	Varanasi	Varanasi	
356	Sevata	Mahendra Kumar Singh	SP		150	Sitapur	Sitapur	
357	Shahabad	Babu Khan	SP		155	Hardoi	Hardoi	
358	Shahganj	Shailendra Yadav 'Lalaee'	SP		365	Jaunpur	Jaunpur	
359	Shahjahanpur	Suresh Kumar Khanna	BJP		135	Shahjahanpur	Shahjahanpur	
360	Shamli	Pankaj Kumar Malik	INC		10	Shamli	Kairana	
361	Shekhupur	Ashish Yadav	SP		116	Budaun	Aonla	
362	Shikarpur	Mukesh Sharma	SP		69	Bulandshahar	Bulandshahr	
363	Shikohabad	Om Prakash Verma	SP		98	Firozabad	Firozabad	
364	Shivpur	Uday Lal Maurya	BSP		386	Varanasi	Chandauli	
365	Shohratgarh	Lalmunni Singh	SP		302	Siddharth Nagar	Domariyaganj	
366	Shrawasti	Muhammad Ramjan	SP		290	Shrawasti	Shrawasti	
367	Sidhauli	Manish Rawat	SP	SC	152	Sitapur	Mohanlalganj	
368	Sikanderpur	Jiauddin Rijvi	SP		359	Ballia	Salempur	
369	Sikandra	Indrapal Singh	BSP		207	Kanpur Rural	Etawah	
370	Sikandra Rao	Ramveer Upadhyay	BSP		80	Hathras	Hathras	
371	Sikandrabad	Bimla Singh Solanki	BJP		64	Bulandshahar	Gautam Buddha Nagar	
372	Sirathu	Vachaspati	SP		251	Kaushambi	Kaushambi	
373	Sirsaganj	Hariom Yadav	SP		99	Firozabad	Firozabad	
374	Sishamau	Haji Irfan Solanki	SP		213	Kanpur	Kanpur	
375	Siswa	Shivendra Singh	SP		317	Maharajganj	Maharajganj	
376	Sitapur	Radhey Shyam Jaisawal	SP		146	Sitapur	Sitapur	
377	Siwalkhas	Ghulam Mohammed	SP		43	Meerut	Bagpat	
378	Soraon	Satyaveer Munna	SP	SC	255	Allahabad	Phulpur	
379	Sri Nagar	Ramsaran	SP	SC	140	Lakhimpur Kheri	Kheri	
380	Suar	Nawab Kazim Ali Khan	INC		34	Rampur	Rampur	
381	Sultanpur	Anoop Sanda	SP		188	Sultanpur	Sultanpur	
382	Syana	Dilnawaz Khan	INC		66	Bulandshahar	Bulandshahr	
383	Tamkuhi Raj	Ajay Kumar 'Lalloo'	INC		331	Kushinagar	Deoria	
384	Tanda	Azimulhaq Pahalwan	SP		278	Ambedkar Nagar	Ambedkar Nagar	
385	Tarabganj	Awadhesh Kumar Singh	SP		299	Gonda	Kaiserganj	
386	Thakurdwara	Kunwar Sarvesh Kumar	BJP		26	Moradabad	Moradabad	Elected to 16th Lok Sabha in May 2014
386	Thakurdwara	Navab Jan	SP		26	Moradabad	Moradabad	Elected during by-election
387	Thana Bhawan	Suresh Kumar	BJP		09	Shamli	Kairana	
388	Tilhar	Roshan Lal Verma	BSP		133	Shahjahanpur	Shahjahanpur	
389	Tiloi	Mohd. Muslim	INC		178	Raebareli	Amethi	
390	Tindwari	Daljeet Singh	INC		232	Banda	Hamirpur	
391	Tirwa	Vyjai Bahadur Pal	SP		197	Kannauj	Kannauj	
392	Tulsipur	Abdul Mashhood Khan	SP		291	Balrampur	Shrawasti	
393	Tundla	Rakesh Babu	BSP	SC	95	Firozabad	Firozabad	
394	Unchahar	Manoj Pandey	SP		183	Raebareli	Rae Bareli	
395	Unnao	Pankaj Gupta	SP		165	Unnao	Unnao	
396	Utraula	Arif Anwar Hashmi	SP		293	Balrampur	Gonda	
397	Varanasi Cantt.	Jyotsana Srivastava	BJP		390	Varanasi	Varanasi	
398	Varanasi North	Ravindra Jaiswal	BJP		388	Varanasi	Varanasi	
399	Varanasi South	Shyamdev Roy Chaudhari	BJP		389	Varanasi	Varanasi	
400	Zafrabad	Sachindra Nath Tripathi	SP		371	Jaunpur	Machhlishahr	
401	Zahoorabad	Syeda Shadab Fatima	SP		377	Ghazipur	Ballia	
402	Zaidpur	Ramgopal	SP	SC	269	Barabanki	Barabanki	
403	Zamania	Omprakash	SP		379	Ghazipur	Ghazipur	

== See also ==
- First Legislative Assembly of Uttar Pradesh
- Government of Uttar Pradesh
- List of chief ministers of Uttar Pradesh
- Politics of India
- Uttar Pradesh Legislative Assembly
- 2012 Uttar Pradesh Legislative Assembly election
- Vidhan Bhawan

== Notes ==
- Strength as of 19 May 2016. MLA strength changed due candidates vacating their post after getting elected into 16th Lok Sabha or death of sitting members, and the subsequent by-elections held.
- ID is the Constituency identification number assigned during "Delimitation of Parliamentary and Assembly Constituencies Order, 2008".
- LS constituency is the corresponding Lok Sabha constituency for the Assembly constituency.
