= History of the Uttar Pradesh Legislative Assembly =

Coordinates: 26°50′37″N 80°56′39″E

Uttar Pradesh Legislative Assembly Uttar Pradesh Vidhan Sabha
- 18th Uttar Pradesh Assembly

Type
- Type: Lower house of the Uttar Pradesh Legislature

History
- Founded: 19 May 1952 (74 years ago)
- Preceded by: United Provinces Legislative Council

Leadership
- Governor: Anandiben Patel since 29 July 2019
- Speaker: Satish Mahana, BJP since 29 March 2022
- Leader of the House: Yogi Adityanath, BJP since 19 March 2017
- Minister of Legislative Affairs: Suresh Khanna, BJP since 25 March 2022
- Leader of the Opposition: Mata Prasad Pandey, SP since 28 July 2024
- Principal Secretary: Pradeep Kumar Dubey, PCS J (Retd.) since 30 March 2021

Structure
- Seats: 403
- Political groups: Government (294) NDA (294): BJP (257); AD(S) (13); RLD (9); SBSP (6); NISHAD (5); IND (4); Official Opposition (102) SP+ (102): SP (100); INC (2); Other Opposition (2): JD(L) (2); Vacant (5) Vacant (5)

Elections
- Voting system: First-past-the-post
- Last election: 10 February 2022 – 7 March 2022
- Next election: 2027

Meeting place
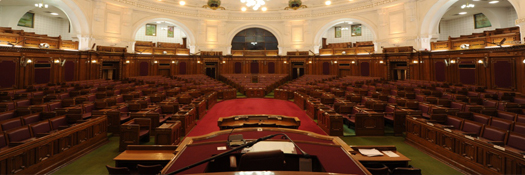
- Vidhan Sabha Chamber, Vidhan Bhavan, Vidhan Sabha Marg, Lucknow - 226 001

Website
- Uttar Pradesh Legislative Assembly

The Legislative Assembly for the United Provinces was constituted for the first time on 1 April 1937 in accordance with the Government of India Act, 1935 with a strength of 228. The size of the Uttar Pradesh Legislative Assembly was decided as 403 members after the Uttar Pradesh Reorganisation Act, 2000. There is one nominated Anglo-Indian member in addition to 403 members. The first session of the provisional Uttar Pradesh Legislature under the new Constitution of India that established the country as a republic began on 2 February 1950. After the first elections the newly elected Assembly of Uttar Pradesh met on 19 May 1952.

== Pre-independence ==
The Legislative Assembly for the United Provinces was constituted for the first time on 1 April 1937 in accordance with the Government of India Act, 1935. The strength of the Assembly as stipulated under the Act of 1935 was 228 and its term was five years. Purushottam Das Tandon and Abdul Hakim were elected as Speaker and Deputy Speaker respectively on 31 July 1937.

== Post-independence ==
After India became independent, the legislative assembly met for the first time on 3 November 1947. At its meeting on 4 November 1947, the legislative assembly adopted a resolution for the use of Hindi in all proceedings.

On 25 February 1948, the Assembly passed a resolution requesting the Governor to submit to the Governor General the request of the assembly to the effect that the High Court of Judicature at Allahabad and the Oudh Chief Court be amalgamated.

Another important resolution passed by the House on 18 October 1948 congratulated the Indian government and military on its successful annexation of Hyderabad.

== Post-1950 ==
The first session of the provisional Uttar Pradesh Legislature under the new Constitution of India that established the country as a republic began on 2 February 1950 with an address by Governor Homi Mody to both houses in the Assembly Hall. Prior to the commencement of the session, the governor administered the oath of office to P. D. Tandon and Chandra Bhal respectively in their respective chambers, thereafter all other members present took oath or made affirmation, as required by the Constitution, in their respective Houses.

An important legislative measure passed in 1950 was the U. P. Language (Bills and Acts) Act, 1950, which mandated that all bills and acts were to be written in Hindi with the Devanagari script. In 1951, the U. P. Official Language Act was passed, making Hindi with Devanagari script the language to be used for all official purposes of the state.

On 11 August 1950, Speaker Purshottam Das Tandon resigned from his office. He was replaced by Deputy Speaker Nafisul Hasan on 21 December 1950. Upon his accession, he announced that he would not be take part in partisan politics as Speaker, unlike his predecessor.

Hargovind Pant was elected the Deputy Speaker on 4 January 1951.

After the first elections the newly elected Assembly of Uttar Pradesh met on 19 May 1952. On 20 May 1952, Atma Ram Govind Kher was elected the Speaker. Govind Kher speaking on the occasion, said that of the two different conventions set by his two predecessors in office in the matter of taking part in politics he would like to follow neither but would strive to follow a middle course in this regard. He said that he would not take part in active politics nor hold any office in the Congress Party to which he belonged, but at the same time he would continue to be a member of that party and take part in non-controversial activities, particularly relating to social and developmental work.

== 2008 Delimitation ==
Until 1967, the Assembly was composed of 431 members, including one nominated Anglo-Indian member. According to the recommendation of the Delimitation Commission, which is appointed after every census, it was revised to 426. After the 2000 Uttar Pradesh Reorganisation Act, which separated the new state of Uttarakhand from Uttar Pradesh, the size of the Assembly decreased to 403 members. It stayed at 403 + 1 in the delimitation of 2008 which incorporated the 2001 census data. One Assembly term lasts five years unless it is dissolved earlier. The Assembly also has the highest number of seats of any state legislature in India.

== List of Assemblies ==
Following are the dates of constitution and dissolution of the Uttar Pradesh Legislative Assembly. First sitting date and date of completion of term for each Vidhan Sabha can be different from the constitution and dissolution dates (respectively).

| Vidhan Sabha | Constitution | Dissolution | Days |
|---|---|---|---|
| 1st | 20 May 1952 | 31 March 1957 | 1,776 |
| 2nd | 1 April 1957 | 6 March 1962 | 1,800 |
| 3rd | 7 March 1962 | 9 March 1967 | 1,828 |
| 4th | 10 March 1967 | 15 April 1968 | 402 |
| 5th | 26 February 1969 | 4 March 1974 | 1,832 |
| 6th | 4 March 1974 | 30 April 1977 | 1,153 |
| 7th | 23 June 1977 | 17 February 1980 | 969 |
| 8th | 9 June 1980 | 10 March 1985 | 1,735 |
| 9th | 10 March 1985 | 29 November 1989 | 1,725 |
| 10th | 2 December 1989 | 4 April 1991 | 488 |
| 11th | 22 June 1991 | 6 December 1992 | 533 |
| 12th | 4 December 1993 | 28 October 1995 | 693 |
| 13th | 17 October 1996 | 7 March 2002 | 1,967 |
| 14th | 26 February 2002 | 13 May 2007 | 1,902 |
| 15th | 13 May 2007 | 9 March 2012 | 1,762 |
| 16th | 8 March 2012 | 11 March 2017 | 1,829 |
| 17th | 19 March 2017 | 12 March 2022 | 1,834 |
| 18th | 29 March 2022 | - | 4 years, 154 days |

== Election results ==
Uttar Pradesh

Uttar Pradesh Legislative Assembly (Vidhan Sabha) Election Result.
| Party | Years | | | | | | | | | | | | | | | | | |
| Party | 2022 | 2017 | 2012 | 2007 | 2002 | 1996 | 1993 | 1991 | 1989 | 1985 | 1980 | 1977 | 1974 | 1969 | 1967 | 1962 | 1957 | 1951 |
|---|---|---|---|---|---|---|---|---|---|---|---|---|---|---|---|---|---|---|
| Akhil Bharat Hindu Mahasabha (ABHM) | | | | | 1 | | | | 1 | | | | | 1 | | | | 1 |
| Akhil Bhartiya Loktantrik Congress (ABLTC) | | | | 1 | 2 | | | | | | | | | | | | | |
| Akhil Bharatiya Ram Rajya Parishad (RRP) | | | | | | | | | | | | | | | | | | 1 |
| Apna Dal (Sonelal) | 12 | 9 | 1 | | 3 | | | | | | | | | | | | | |
| All India Bhartiya Jan Sangh (BJS) | | | | | | | | | | | | | | | | | 17 | 2 |
| Bharatiya Jan Sangh (BJS) | | | | | | | | | | | | | 61 | 49 | 98 | | | |
| Bahujan Samaj Party (BSP) | 1 | 19 | 80 | 206 | 98 | 67 | 67 | 12 | 13 | | | | | | | | | |
| Bharatiya Janata Party (BJP) | 255 | 312 | 47 | 51 | 88 | 174 | 177 | 221 | 57 | 16 | 11 | | | | | | | |
| Bharatiya Kranti Dal (BKD) | | | | | | 8 | | | | | | | 106 | 98 | | | | |
| Communist Party of India (CPI) | | | | | | 1 | 3 | 4 | 6 | 6 | 7 | 9 | 16 | 80 | 13 | 14 | 9 | |
| Communist Party of India (Marxist) [CPI(M)] | | | | | 2 | 4 | 1 | 1 | 2 | 2 | | 1 | 2 | 1 | 1 | | | |
| Hindu Maha Sabha (HMS) | | | | | | | | | | | | | 1 | | | 2 | | |
| Indian National Congress (INC) | 2 | 7 | 28 | 22 | 25 | 33 | 28 | 46 | 94 | 269 | 309 | 47 | 215 | 211 | 199 | 249 | 286 | 388 |
| Jan Sangh (JS) | | | | | | | | | | | | | | | | 49 | | |
| Janata Dal (JD) | | | | | | 7 | 27 | 92 | 208 | | | | | | | | | |
| Janata Party (JP / JNP) | | | | | | | 1 | 34 | 1 | 20 | 4 | 352 | | | | | | |
| Janata Party (Secular) - Ch. Charan Singh – JNP(SC) | | | | | | | | | | | 59 | | | | | | | |
| Lok Dal (LKD) | | | | | | | | | | 84 | | | | | | | | |
| Nirbal Indian Shoshit Hamara Aam Dal | 6 | 1 | | | | | | | | | | | | | | | | |
| Peace Party (PECP) | | | 4 | | | | | | | | | | | | | | | |
| Rashtriya Lok Dal (RLD) | 8 | 1 | 9 | 10 | 14 | | | | | | | | | | | | | |
| Samajwadi Party (SP) | 111 | 47 | 224 | 97 | 143 | 110 | 109 | | | | | | | | | | | |
| Samyukta Socialist Party (SSP) | | | | | | | | | | | | | | 33 | | | | |
| Suheldev Bhartiya Samaj Party | 6 | 4 | | | | | | | | | | | | | | | | |
| Swatantra Party (SWA) | | | | | | | | | | | | | 1 | 5 | 12 | 15 | | |
| Independent (IND) | 2 | 3 | 6 | 9 | 16 | 13 | 8 | 7 | 40 | 23 | 17 | 16 | 5 | 18 | 37 | 31 | 74 | 15 |
| Total Seats | 403 | 403 | 403 | 403 | 403 | 424 | 425 | 425 | 425 | 425 | 425 | 425 | 424 | 425 | 425 | 430 | 430 | 430 |
