= Babulal =

Babulal is a given name. Notable people with the name include:

- Amerish Babulal Bera (born 1965), American physician and politician
- Prabhudas Babulal Bhilawekar, member of the 13th Maharashtra Legislative Assembly
- Babulal Chaudhary (born 1948), Indian Bharatiya Janata Party politician
- Babulal Dahiya, farmer and poet
- Babulal Gaur (1929–2019), Indian politician of the Bharatiya Janata Party (BJP)
- Babulal Jain (1934–2021), Indian politician of the Bharatiya Janata Party
- Babulal Marandi (born 1958), Indian politician of the Bharatiya Janata Party (BJP)
- Babulal Nagar, Indian politician formerly with the Indian National Congress party
- Babulal Patodi (1920–2012), Indian social worker and freedom activist
- Babulal Sethia DL, British Consultant Cardiac Surgeon
- Babulal Solanki, Indian politician
- Babulal Tiwari, Indian politician

== See also ==
- Bengal Film Journalists' Association – Babulal Chowkhani Memorial Trophy for Best Original Story
- Babu (disambiguation)
- Babu Lall
- Boublil (disambiguation)
