= Bandana Singh =

Indian politician

MLA, 17th Legislative Assembly
- In office March 2017 – March 2022
- Preceded by: Abhay Narayan
- Constituency: Sagri, Azamgarh

Personal details
- Born: 7 October 1981 (age 44) Tegna, Mau, Uttar Pradesh
- Party: Bharatiya Janata Party (2021-Present)
- Other political affiliations: Bahujan Samaj Party (Till 2021)
- Spouse: Sarvesh Singh Sipu (m. 2003; died 2013)
- Relations: Yash Thakur (Nephew)
- Children: Kritika Singh Rathour, Samarth Singh Rathour, Dhairya Singh Rathour
- Parent: Ravindra Nath Singh (Father)
- Education: Veer Bahadur Singh Purvanchal University
- Occupation: MLA
- Profession: Politician, Agriculture

Bandana Singh (born 7 October 1981) is an Indian Politician and a Member of 17th Legislative Assembly of Azamgarh district, Uttar Pradesh state of India. She represents the Sagri Constituency of Uttar Pradesh and is a Member of Bahujan Samaj Party.

== Early life and education ==
Singh was born 7 October 1981 in Tegna, Mau, Uttar Pradesh to her father Shri Ravindra Nath Singh. She married Sarvesh Singh Sipu (Ex MLA of Sagri) in 2003. Sipu was shot dead in 2013 at his home by unknown shooters, they have two sons and one daughter. She belongs to Rajput (Kshatriya) family. She got M.A. degree in 2003 and B.Ed. in 2009 from Veer Bahadur Singh Purvanchal University.

== Political career ==
Singh has been a member of the 17th Legislative Assembly of Uttar Pradesh. Since 2017, she has represented the Sagri constituency and is a member of the Bahujan Samaj Party. She defeated Samajwadi Party candidate Jairam Patel by a margin of 5,475 votes.

== Posts held ==
#	From	To	Position	Comments
01	March 2017	March 2022	Member, 17th Legislative Assembly of Uttar Pradesh	
