= Manpal Singh =

Indian politician

Member of Uttar Pradesh Legislative Assembly
- In office March 2012 – March 2017
- Preceded by: Hasrat Ullah Sherwani
- Succeeded by: Devendra Singh Rajput
- In office February 2002 – May 2007
- Preceded by: Netram Singh
- Succeeded by: Hasrat Ullah Sherwani
- In office March 1985 – November 1989
- Succeeded by: Goverdhan Singh
- In office June 1980 – March 1985
- Preceded by: Netram Singh
- In office March 1974 – April 1977
- Preceded by: Netram Singh
- Succeeded by: Netram Singh
- Constituency: Kasganj (Assembly constituency)

Personal details
- Born: 6 August 1938 (age 88) Etah district
- Party: Samajwadi Party
- Other political affiliations: Indian National Congress
- Spouse: Suraj Kumari (wife)
- Parent: Kundan Singh (father)
- Education: Dr. Bhimrao Ambedkar University
- Profession: Farmer, lawyer & politician

Manpal Singh is an India politician and a member of the Sixteenth Legislative Assembly of Uttar Pradesh in India. He represents the Kasganj assembly constituency of Uttar Pradesh as a member of the Samajwadi political party.

== Early life and education ==
Manpal Singh was born in the Etah district. He attended the Dr. Bhimrao Ambedkar University, where he obtained his Bachelor of Laws (LL.B) degree.

== Political career ==
Singh has been a Member of the Legislative Assembly (MLA) representing the Kaasganj constituency for six terms.

=== Posts held ===
From	To	Position
2012	2017	Member, 16th Legislative Assembly
2002	2007	Member, 14th Legislative Assembly
1985	1989	Member, 09th Legislative Assembly
1980	1985	Member, 08th Legislative Assembly
1974	1977	Member, 06th Legislative Assembly

== See also ==
- Kasganj (Assembly constituency)
- Sixteenth Legislative Assembly of Uttar Pradesh
- Uttar Pradesh Legislative Assembly
