= Kasganj Assembly constituency =

Constituency of the Uttar Pradesh legislative assembly in India

Kasganj
- Constituency No. 100 for the Uttar Pradesh Legislative Assembly

Constituency details
- Country: India
- Region: North India
- State: Uttar Pradesh
- District: Kasganj
- Total electors: 3,59,893 (2022)
- Reservation: None

Member of Legislative Assembly
- 18th Uttar Pradesh Legislative Assembly
- Incumbent Devendra Singh Rajput
- Party: Bharatiya Janata Party
- Elected year: 2022

Kasganj Assembly constituency is one of the 403 constituencies of the Uttar Pradesh Legislative Assembly, India. It is a part of the Etah district and one of the five assembly constituencies in the Etah Lok Sabha constituency. First election in this assembly constituency was held in 1952 after the "DPACO (1951)" (delimitation order) was passed in 1951. After the "Delimitation of Parliamentary and Assembly Constituencies Order" was passed in 2008, the constituency was assigned identification number 100.

== Wards / Areas ==
Extent of Kasganj Assembly constituency is KCs Nameni, Bilram, Soron, Soron MB, Kasganj MB & Bilram NP of Kasganj Tehsil.

== Members of the Legislative Assembly ==
#	Term	Name	Party	From	To	Days	Comments	Ref
01	01st Vidhan Sabha	Tirmal Singh	Indian National Congress	Mar-1952	Mar-1957	1,849	Constituency was called "Kasganj North"	
02	02nd Vidhan Sabha	Kali Charan	Indian National Congress	Apr-1957	Mar-1962	1,800	-	
03	03rd Vidhan Sabha	Girwar Prasad	Bharatiya Jana Sangh	Mar-1962	Mar-1967	1,828	-	
04	04th Vidhan Sabha	Kali Charan	Indian National Congress	Mar-1967	Apr-1968	402	-	
05	05th Vidhan Sabha	Netram Singh	Bharatiya Jana Sangh	Feb-1969	Mar-1974	1,832	-	
06	06th Vidhan Sabha	Manpal Singh	Indian National Congress	Mar-1974	Apr-1977	1,153	-	
07	07th Vidhan Sabha	Netram Singh	Janata Party	Jun-1977	Feb-1980	969	-	
08	08th Vidhan Sabha	Manpal Singh	Indian National Congress (I)	Jun-1980	Mar-1985	1,735	-	
09	09th Vidhan Sabha	Manpal Singh	Indian National Congress	Mar-1985	Nov-1989	1,725	-	
10	10th Vidhan Sabha	Goverdhan Singh	Janata Dal	Dec-1989	Apr-1991	488	-	
11	11th Vidhan Sabha	Netram Singh	Bharatiya Janata Party	Jun-1991	Dec-1992	533	-	
12	12th Vidhan Sabha	Kalyan Singh	Bharatiya Janata Party	Dec-1993	Oct-1995	693	-	
13	13th Vidhan Sabha	Netram Singh	Bharatiya Janata Party	Oct-1996	May-2002	1,967	-	
14	14th Vidhan Sabha	Manpal Singh	Samajwadi Party	Feb-2002	May-2007	1,902	-	
15	15th Vidhan Sabha	Hasratullah Sherwani	Bahujan Samaj Party	May-2007	Mar-2012	1,762	-	
16	16th Vidhan Sabha	Manpal Singh	Samajwadi Party	Mar-2012	Mar-2017	-	-	
17	17th Vidhan Sabha	Devendra Singh Rajput	Bharatiya Janata Party	Mar-2017	Mar-2022			
18	18th Vidhan Sabha	Devendra Singh Rajput	Bharatiya Janata Party	Mar-2017	Incumbent			

== Election results ==
=== 2027 ===
2027 Uttar Pradesh Legislative Assembly election: Kasganj
Party	Candidate	Votes	%	±%
INDIA				
NDA				
BSP				
NOTA	None of the above			
Majority				
Turnout				
gain from		Swing		

=== 2022 ===
2022 Uttar Pradesh Legislative Assembly election: Kasganj
Party	Candidate	Votes	%	±%
BJP	Devendra Singh Rajput	123,410	52.67	+6.37
SP	Manpal Singh	77,145	32.92	+10.26
BSP	Mohammed Arif	23,001	9.82	−7.36
INC	Kuldeep Pandey	5,951	2.54	
NOTA	None of the above	1,264	0.54	−0.39
Majority		46,265	19.75	−3.89
Turnout		234,326	64.37	+0.7
BJP hold		Swing		

=== 2017 ===
2017 Uttar Pradesh Legislative Assembly Election: Kasganj
Party	Candidate	Votes	%	±%
BJP	Devendra Singh Rajput	101,908	46.3	
SP	Hasratullah Sherwani	49,878	22.66	
BSP	Ajay Chaturvedi	37,818	17.18	
MD	Sudhir Yadav	22,250	10.11	
Rashtravadi Pratap Sena	Kuldeep Kumar	2,803	1.27	
NOTA	None of the above	2,023	0.93	
Majority		52,030	23.64	
Turnout		220,120	63.67	

=== 2012 ===
16th Vidhan Sabha: 2012 Elections

2012 General Elections: Kasganj
Party	Candidate	Votes	%	±%
SP	Manpal Singh	48,535	25.41	−
BSP	Hasratullah Sherwani	38,356	20.08	−
Independent	Devendra Singh Rajput	35,047	18.35	−
	Remainder 12 candidates	69,035	36.17	−
Majority		10,179	5.33	−
Turnout		190,973	59.56	−
SP gain from BSP		Swing		

== See also ==
- Etah district
- Etah Lok Sabha constituency
- Sixteenth Legislative Assembly of Uttar Pradesh
- Uttar Pradesh Legislative Assembly
- Vidhan Bhawan
