= Gaya Charan Dinkar =

Indian politician

Leader of Opposition Uttar Pradesh Legislative Assembly
- In office 2016–2017
- Preceded by: Swami Prasad Maurya
- Constituency: Naraini

Member of the Uttar Pradesh Legislative Assembly
- In office 2012–2017

Personal details
- Party: Bahujan Samaj Party
- Occupation: Politician

Gaya Charan Dinkar is an Indian politician and a member of the Bahujan Samaj Party from the state of Uttar Pradesh.Dinkar is a member and Leader of the Opposition in the Sixteenth Legislative Assembly of Uttar Pradesh.
