= Rajeev Kumar Singh (Dataganj politician) =

Indian politician

Member of the Uttar Pradesh legislative assembly
- Incumbent
- Assumed office 2017
- Preceded by: Sinod Kumar Shakya
- Constituency: Dataganj

Personal details
- Born: September 18, 1961 (age 65) Dataganj, Uttar Pradesh, India
- Party: Bharatiya Janata Party
- Parent(s): Ram Pal Singh; Satyavati Devi
- Occupation: MLA
- Profession: Politician

Rajeev Kumar Singh is an Indian politician and member of 17th Legislative Assembly, Uttar Pradesh of India. He represents the ‘Dataganj’ constituency in Badaun district of Uttar Pradesh.

== Career ==
=== Uttar Pradesh Legislative Assembly ===
Rajeev Kumar Singh contested 2017 Uttar Pradesh Legislative Assembly election as Bharatiya Janata Party candidate and defeated his close contestant Sinod Kumar Shakya from Bahujan Samaj Party with a margin of 25,759 votes. He was a member of the 17th Legislative Assembly of Uttar Pradesh between 2017 and 2022.
