= Somendra Tomar =

Indian politician

Dr Somendra Tomer

Minister of state Independent Charge for Sainik Welfare & Prantiya Raksha Dal PRD Government of Uttar Pradesh
- Incumbent
- Assumed office 25 March 2022
- Minister: Dr.Somendra Tomar
- Chief Minister: Yogi Adityanath

Member of the Uttar Pradesh Legislative Assembly
- Incumbent
- Assumed office 11 March 2017
- Preceded by: Ravindra Kumar Bhadana
- Constituency: Meerut South

Personal details
- Born: 3 July 1980 (age 46) Meerut, Uttar Pradesh, India
- Party: Bharatiya Janata Party
- Parent(s): Sh. Mahendra Singh and Smt. Dhanpali Devi
- Profession: Politician

Somendra Tomar is an Indian politician and a member of the 17th and 18th Legislative Assembly for Uttar Pradesh, India. He represents the Meerut South constituency of Uttar Pradesh. He is a member of the Bharatiya Janata Party.

== Political career ==
Tomar has been a member of the 17th Legislative Assembly of Uttar Pradesh. Since 2017, he has represented the Meerut South constituency and is a member of BJP.

== Education and early student politics ==
He was born into a Tomar Rajput family to Mahendra Singh in 1980.

Dr. Somendra Tomar began his academic journey in Uttar Pradesh. He completed his high school education in 1995 and his intermediate (12th standard) in 1997, both from the Uttar Pradesh Board of Secondary Education.

In 2000, he earned a Bachelor of Science (B.Sc) degree from Chaudhary Charan Singh University (CCSU), Meerut. He continued his postgraduate studies at the same university, receiving a Master of Science (M.Sc) degree in 2002. In 2003, he completed an M.Phil. degree from CCSU and later went on to complete his Ph.D. from the same institution.

Dr. Tomar’s involvement in student politics began in 1999 when he joined the Akhil Bharatiya Vidyarthi Parishad (ABVP), the student wing of the Rashtriya Swayamsevak Sangh (RSS). He was active in the organization until 2004. In 2003, he contested and won the CCSU alumni student union elections under the banner of ABVP.

His political journey, which began in the student politics of CCSU, eventually led to his appointment as Minister of State in the Government of Uttar Pradesh. He was elected twice as a Member of the Legislative Assembly (MLA) from the Meerut South constituency and was later inducted into the cabinet of Chief Minister Yogi Adityanath.

== Posts held ==
#	From	To	Position	Comments
01	2017	2022	Member, 17th Legislative Assembly	
02	2022	Incumbent	Member, 18th Legislative Assembly	

== See also ==
- Uttar Pradesh Legislative Assembly
