= Sagri Assembly constituency =

Assembly constituency in Uttar Pradesh, India

Coordinates: 26.24°N 83.26°E

Sagri
- Constituency No. 345 for the Uttar Pradesh Legislative Assembly

Constituency details
- Country: India
- Region: North India
- State: Uttar Pradesh
- District: Azamgarh
- Total electors: 3,36,378
- Reservation: None

Member of Legislative Assembly
- 18th Uttar Pradesh Legislative Assembly
- Incumbent Hriday Narayan Singh Patel
- Party: Samajwadi Party
- Elected year: 2022

Sagri is a constituency of the Uttar Pradesh Legislative Assembly covering the city of Sagri in the Azamgarh district of Uttar Pradesh, India. It is one of five assembly constituencies in the Azamgarh Lok Sabha constituency. Since 2008, this assembly constituency is numbered 345 amongst 403 constituencies.

== Election results ==
=== 2027 ===
2027 Uttar Pradesh Legislative Assembly election: Sagri
Party	Candidate	Votes	%	±%
INDIA				
NDA				
BSP				
NOTA	None of the above			
Majority				
Turnout				
gain from		Swing		

=== 2022 ===
2022 Uttar Pradesh Legislative Assembly election: Sagri
Party	Candidate	Votes	%	±%
SP	Hriday Narayan Singh Patel	83,093	42.76	+11.09
BJP	Smt. Vandana Singh	60,578	31.17	+8.4
BSP	Shankar Yadav	41,006	21.1	−13.63
Jan Adhikar Party	Pankaj Maurya	2,415	1.24	
NOTA	None of the above	1,148	0.59	+0.05
Majority		22,515	11.59	+8.53
Turnout		194,340	57.77	+3.05
SP gain from BSP		Swing		

=== 2017 ===
Bahujan Samaj Party member Bandana Singh served as the MLA who won in the 2017 Uttar Pradesh Legislative Assembly election defeating Samajwadi Party candidate Jairam Patel by a margin of 5,475 votes.

2017 Uttar Pradesh Legislative Assembly Election: Sagr
Party	Candidate	Votes	%	±%
BSP	Bandana Singh	62,203	34.73	
SP	Jairam Patel	56,728	31.67	
BJP	Devendra Kumar Singh	40,786	22.77	
Independent	Gopal Nishad	5,876	3.28	
NISHAD	Ritu Khare	2,427	1.35	
Independent	Vijay Kumar Gond	1,716	0.96	
NOTA	None of the above	964	0.54	
Majority		5,475	3.06	
Turnout		179,125	54.72	

== Members of Legislative Assembly ==
#	Term	Member of Legislative Assembly	Party	From	To	Days	Comment
01	2nd Vidhan Sabha	Indra Bhushan	Independent	April 1957	March 1962	1,800	
02	3rd Vidhan Sabha	Indrasan	Indian National Congress	March 1962	March 1967	1,828	
03	4th Vidhan Sabha	Narbdeshwar	Communist Party of India	March 1967	April 1968	402	
04	5th Vidhan Sabha	Ram Kunwar	Indian National Congress	February 1969	March 1974	1,832	
05	6th Vidhan Sabha	Ram Sunder Pandey	Indian National Congress	March 1974	April 1977	1,153	
06	7th Vidhan Sabha	Ram Janam	Janata Party	June 1977	February 1980	969	
07	8th Vidhan Sabha	Panchanan	Indian National Congress (Indira)	June 1980	March 1985	1,735	
08	9th Vidhan Sabha	Ram Janam	Lok Dal	March 1985	November 1989	1,725	
09	10th Vidhan Sabha	Panchanan	Indian National Congress	December 1989	April 1991	488	
10	11th Vidhan Sabha	Barkhu Ram Verma	Bahujan Samaj Party	June 1991	December 1992	533	
11	12th Vidhan Sabha	Barkhu Ram Verma	Bahujan Samaj Party	December 1993	October 1995	693	
12	13th Vidhan Sabha	Ram Pyare	Samajwadi Party	October 1996	March 2002	1,967	
13	14th Vidhan Sabha	Malik Masood	Bahujan Samaj Party	February 2002	May 2007	1,902	
14	15th Vidhan Sabha	Sarvesh Kumar Singh Sipu	Samajwadi Party	May 2007	March 2012	1,736	
15	16th Vidhan Sabha	Abhay Narayan	Samajwadi Party	March 2012	March 2017	1,829	
16	17th Vidhan Sabha	Bandana Singh	Bahujan Samaj Party	March 2017	March 2022	3476	
