= Faridpur Assembly constituency =

Constituency of the Uttar Pradesh legislative assembly in India

Faridpur
- Constituency No. 122 for the Uttar Pradesh Legislative Assembly

Constituency details
- Country: India
- Region: North India
- State: Uttar Pradesh
- District: Bareilly
- Lok Sabha constituency: Aonla
- Total electors: 267,792 (2012)
- Reservation: SC

Member of Legislative Assembly
- 18th Uttar Pradesh Legislative Assembly
- Incumbent Vacant

Faridpur Assembly constituency is one of the 403 constituencies of the Uttar Pradesh Legislative Assembly, India. It is a part of the Bareilly district and one of the five assembly constituencies in the Aonla Lok Sabha constituency. First election in this assembly constituency was held in 1957 after the "DPACO (1956)" (delimitation order) was passed in 1956. After the "Delimitation of Parliamentary and Assembly Constituencies Order" was passed in 2008, the constituency was assigned identification number 122 and is reserved for candidates from the Scheduled caste community.

== Wards / Areas ==
Extent of Faridpur Assembly constituency is Faridpur Tehsil.

== Members of the Legislative Assembly ==
#	Term	Name	Party	From	To	Days	Comments	Ref
01	01st Vidhan Sabha	-	-	Mar-1952	Mar-1957	1,849	Constituency not in existence	
02	02nd Vidhan Sabha	Sunder Lal	Indian National Congress	Apr-1957	Mar-1962	1,800	-	
02	02nd Vidhan Sabha	Nathu Singh	Indian National Congress	Apr-1957	Mar-1962	1,800	-	
03	03rd Vidhan Sabha	Hem Raj	Bharatiya Jana Sangh	Mar-1962	Mar-1967	1,828	-	
04	04th Vidhan Sabha	O. P. Singh	Indian National Congress	Mar-1967	Apr-1968	402	-	
05	05th Vidhan Sabha	Rajeshwar Singh	Bharatiya Kranti Dal	Feb-1969	Mar-1974	1,832	-	
06	06th Vidhan Sabha	Hem Raj	Bharatiya Kranti Dal	Mar-1974	Apr-1977	1,153	-	
07	07th Vidhan Sabha	Siyaram Sagar	Janata Party	Jun-1977	Feb-1980	969	-	
08	08th Vidhan Sabha	Nand Ram	Bharatiya Janata Party	Jun-1980	Mar-1985	1,735	-	
09	09th Vidhan Sabha	Nathu Lal Vikal	Indian National Congress	Mar-1985	Nov-1989	1,725	-	
10	10th Vidhan Sabha	Siyaram Sagar	Independent	Dec-1989	Apr-1991	488	-	
11	11th Vidhan Sabha	Nand Ram	Bharatiya Janata Party	Jun-1991	Dec-1992	533	-	
12	12th Vidhan Sabha	Siyaram Sagar	Samajwadi Party	Dec-1993	Oct-1995	693	-	
13	13th Vidhan Sabha	Nand Ram	Samajwadi Party	Oct-1996	May-2002	1,967	-	
14	14th Vidhan Sabha	Siyaram Sagar	Samajwadi Party	Feb-2002	May-2007	1,902	-	
15	15th Vidhan Sabha	Vijay Pal Singh	Bahujan Samaj Party	May-2007	Mar-2012	1,762	-	
16	16th Vidhan Sabha	Siyaram Sagar	Samajwadi Party	Mar-2012	Mar 2017	-	-	
17	17th Vidhan Sabha	Shyam Bihari Lal	Bhartiya Janata Party	Mar-2017	Mar-2022	-	-	
18	18th Vidhan Sabha	Shyam Bihari Lal	Bhartiya Janata Party	Mar-2022	Jan 2026			

== Election results ==
=== 2027 ===
2027 Uttar Pradesh Legislative Assembly election: Faridpur
Party	Candidate	Votes	%	±%
INDIA				
NDA				
BSP				
NOTA	None of the above			
Majority				
Turnout				
gain from		Swing		

=== 2022 ===
2022 Uttar Pradesh Legislative Assembly election: Faridpur
Party	Candidate	Votes	%	±%
BJP	Prof. Dr. Shyam Bihari Lal	92,070	45.22	▲1.24
SP	Vijay Pal Singh	89,149	43.78	▲12.8
BSP	Shalini Singh	14,478	7.11	▼12.7
NOTA	None of the above	1,532	0.75	▼0.22
Majority		2,921	1.44	▼11.56
Turnout		203,607	62.06	▲0.11
BJP hold		Swing		

=== 2017 ===
2017 Uttar Pradesh Legislative Assembly election: Faridpur
Party	Candidate	Votes	%	±%
BJP	Prof. Dr. Shyam Bihari Lal	83,656	43.98	
SP	Dr. Siya Ram Sagar	58,935	30.98	
BSP	Vijay Pal Singh	37,680	19.81	
RLD	Poonam Sen	3,075	1.62	
Independent	Shalini Singh	1,927	1.01	
NOTA	None of the above	1,831	0.97	
Majority		24,721	13.0	
Turnout		190,209	61.95	

=== 2012 ===
16th Vidhan Sabha: 2012 General Elections

2012 General Elections: Faridpur
Party	Candidate	Votes	%	±%
SP	Siaram Sagar	60,837	35.09	−
BJP	Shyam Bihari	44,050	25.41	−
BSP	Vijay Pal Singh	36,244	20.91	−
	Remainder 9 candidates	32,220	18.59	−
Majority		16,787	9.68	−
Turnout		173,351	64.73	−
SP gain from BSP		Swing		

== See also ==
- Aonla Lok Sabha constituency
- Bareilly district
- Sixteenth Legislative Assembly of Uttar Pradesh
- Uttar Pradesh Legislative Assembly
- Vidhan Bhawan
