= Jamaluddin Siddiqui =

Indian politician

Member of Uttar Pradesh Legislative Assembly
- Constituency: Bhojpur

Personal details
- Spouse: Rizwana Siddiqui
- Children: Arshad Siddiqui
- Parent: Haji Natthu Hassan Siddiqui
- Profession: Agriculture

Jamaluddin Siddiqui (born 29 March 1950) is an Indian politician who is a member of the Samajwadi Party. He represented Bhojpur, Uttar Pradesh Assembly constituency, in the Sixteenth Legislative Assembly of Uttar Pradesh from 2012 to 2017.
