= Nagendra Singh Rathore =

Indian politician

Member of 17th Uttar Pradesh Assembly
- In office 25 March 2017 – 24 March 2022
- Preceded by: Arshad Jamal Siddiqui
- Succeeded by: self

Member of 18th Uttar Pradesh Legislative Assembly
- Incumbent
- Assumed office March 2022
- Preceded by: Arshad Jamal Siddiqui
- Constituency: Bhojpur

Personal details
- Born: 31 August 1957 (age 68) Farrukhabad, Uttar Pradesh, India
- Party: Bharatiya Janata Party
- Spouse: Karuna Rathore
- Children: Three sons
- Parent: Rajendra Singh (father)
- Profession: Politician; Agriculturist

Nagendra Singh Rathore is an Indian politician who is currently serving as a member of the 18th Uttar Pradesh Legislative Assembly. He has represented Bhojpur seat as an MLA since March 2017. He is affiliated with the Bharatiya Janata Party.

Rathore formerly served as first term MLA from Bhojpur in 2017 to 2022.

== Early life ==
Rathore was born to Rajendra Singh Rathore in year 1957.

== Personal life ==
Rathore was married to Karuna Rathore in year 1977 and Rathore has three sons.

== Political career ==
In the following 2022 Uttar Pradesh Legislative Assembly election, Nagendra Singh Rathore of the Bharatiya Janata Party won the seat by defeating Arshad Jamal Siddiqui of the Samajwadi Party with a margin of 27458 votes.
