= Kishni Assembly constituency =

Constituency of the Uttar Pradesh legislative assembly in India

Kishni
- Constituency No. 109 for the Uttar Pradesh Legislative Assembly

Constituency details
- Country: India
- Region: North India
- State: Uttar Pradesh
- District: Mainpuri
- Total electors: 264,153 (2012)
- Reservation: SC

Member of Legislative Assembly
- 18th Uttar Pradesh Legislative Assembly
- Incumbent Brajesh Katheriya
- Party: Samajwadi Party
- Elected year: 2022

Kishni is one of the 403 constituencies of the Uttar Pradesh Legislative Assembly, India. It is a part of the Mainpuri district and one of the five assembly constituencies in the Mainpuri Lok Sabha constituency. First election in this assembly constituency was held in 1962 after the "DPACO (1961)" (delimitation order) was passed in 1961. After the "Delimitation of Parliamentary and Assembly Constituencies Order" was passed in 2008, the constituency was assigned identification number 109.

== Wards / Areas ==
Extent of Kishni Assembly constituency is KC Elau, Kishni, Kusmara of Bhongaon Tehsil; Kusmara NP, Kishni NP of Mainpuri Tehsil & KC Kurra of Karhal Tehsil.

== Members of the Legislative Assembly ==
| # | Term | Name | Party | From | To | Days | Comments | Ref |
|---|---|---|---|---|---|---|---|---|
| 01 | 01st Vidhan Sabha | - | - | Mar-1952 | Mar-1957 | 1,849 | Constituency not in existence | |
| 02 | 02nd Vidhan Sabha | - | - | Apr-1957 | Mar-1962 | 1,800 | Constituency not in existence | |
| 03 | 03rd Vidhan Sabha | Ganesh Chand | Indian National Congress | Mar-1962 | Mar-1967 | 1,828 | - | |
| 04 | 04th Vidhan Sabha | Shiv Raj Singh Yadav | Samyukta Socialist Party | Mar-1967 | Apr-1968 | 402 | - | |
| 05 | 05th Vidhan Sabha | Sheo Bux Singh | Indian National Congress | Feb-1969 | Mar-1974 | 1,832 | - | |
| 06 | 06th Vidhan Sabha | Munshi Lal | Indian National Congress | Mar-1974 | Apr-1977 | 1,153 | - | |
| 07 | 07th Vidhan Sabha | Hakim Lal | Janata Party | Jun-1977 | Feb-1980 | 969 | - | |
| 08 | 08th Vidhan Sabha | Munshi Lal | Indian National Congress (I) | Jun-1980 | Mar-1985 | 1,735 | - | |
| 09 | 09th Vidhan Sabha | Ram Singh | Indian National Congress | Mar-1985 | Nov-1989 | 1,725 | - | |
| 10 | 10th Vidhan Sabha | Rameshwar Dayal Balmiki | Janata Dal | Dec-1989 | Apr-1991 | 488 | - | |
| 11 | 11th Vidhan Sabha | Rameshwar Dayal Balmiki | Janata Party (Secular) | Jun-1991 | Dec-1992 | 533 | - | |
| 12 | 12th Vidhan Sabha | Rameshwar Dayal Balmiki | Samajwadi Party | Dec-1993 | Oct-1995 | 693 | - | |
| 13 | 13th Vidhan Sabha | Rameshwar Dayal Balmiki | Samajwadi Party | Oct-1996 | May-2002 | 1,967 | - | |
| 14 | 14th Vidhan Sabha | Sandhya Katheriya | Samajwadi Party | Feb-2002 | May-2007 | 1,902 | - | |
| 15 | 15th Vidhan Sabha | Sandhya Katheriya | Samajwadi Party | May-2007 | Mar-2012 | 1,762 | - | |
| 16 | 16th Vidhan Sabha | Brajesh Katheriya | Samajwadi Party | Mar-2012 | Mar-2017 | - | - | |
| 17 | 17th Vidhan Sabha | Brajesh Katheriya | Samajwadi Party | Mar-2017 | Mar-2022 | | | |
| 18 | 18th Vidhan Sabha | Brajesh Katheriya | Samajwadi Party | Mar-2022 | Incumbent | | | |

== Election results ==
=== 2027 ===
2027 Uttar Pradesh Legislative Assembly election: Kishni
| Party | Candidate | Votes | % | ±% |
|---|---|---|---|---|
| INDIA | | | | |
| NDA | | | | |
| BSP | | | | |
| NOTA | None of the above | | | |
| Majority | | | | |
| Turnout | | | | |
| gain from | | Swing | | |

=== 2022 ===
2022 Uttar Pradesh Legislative Assembly election: Kishni
| Party | Candidate | Votes | % | ±% |
|---|---|---|---|---|
| SP | Brajesh Katheriya | 97,070 | 49.58 | +4.75 |
| BJP | Dr. Priya Ranjan | 77,919 | 39.8 | +4.18 |
| BSP | Prabhu Dayal | 16,755 | 8.56 | −6.96 |
| NOTA | None of the above | 1,185 | 0.61 | +0.01 |
| Majority | | 19,151 | 9.78 | +0.57 |
| Turnout | | 195,795 | 62.98 | +2.85 |
| SP hold | | Swing | | |

=== 2017 ===
2017 Uttar Pradesh Legislative Assembly Election: Kishni
| Party | Candidate | Votes | % | ±% |
|---|---|---|---|---|
| SP | Brajesh Katheriya | 80,475 | 44.83 | |
| BJP | Sunil Kumar | 63,946 | 35.62 | |
| BSP | Kamlesh Kumari | 27,858 | 15.52 | |
| Jan Adhikar Manch | Suman Diwakar | 2,724 | 1.52 | |
| NOTA | None of the above | 1,070 | 0.6 | |
| Majority | | 16,529 | 9.21 | |
| Turnout | | 179,515 | 60.13 | |

=== 2012 ===
16th Vidhan Sabha: 2012 General Elections

2012 General Elections: Kishni
| Party | Candidate | Votes | % | ±% |
|---|---|---|---|---|
| SP | Brajesh Katheriya | 77,113 | 50.25 | − |
| BSP | Sandhya kumari | 42,063 | 27.41 | − |
| BJP | Sunil Kumar | 21,266 | 13.86 | − |
| | Remainder 9 candidates | 13,011 | 8.47 | − |
| Majority | | 35,050 | 22.84 | − |
| Turnout | | 153,453 | 58.09 | − |
| SP hold | | Swing | | |

== See also ==
- Mainpuri district
- Mainpuri Lok Sabha constituency
- Sixteenth Legislative Assembly of Uttar Pradesh
- Uttar Pradesh Legislative Assembly
- Vidhan Bhawan
