= 15th Uttar Pradesh Assembly =

←	14th Uttar Pradesh Assembly	16th Uttar Pradesh Assembly	→

Overview
- Legislative body: Uttar Pradesh Legislative Assembly
- Meeting place: Vidhan Bhawan
- Term: May 2007 – April 2012
- Election: 2007 Uttar Pradesh Legislative Assembly election
- Government: Bahujan Samaj Party
- Opposition: Samajwadi Party
- Members: 404 (incl 1 nominated Anglo-Indian member)
- Chief Minister: Mayawati
- Speaker of Assembly: Sukhdev Rajbhar
- Leader of Opposition: Mulayam (2007-2009) Shivpal (2009-2012)
- Party control: Bahujan Samaj Party

The 2007 Uttar Pradesh legislative assembly election was held during April–May 2007. It was held to elect a government for the state of Uttar Pradesh in India. The votes were counted and results were declared on 11 May 2007.
