= Dataganj Assembly constituency =

Constituency of the Uttar Pradesh legislative assembly in India

Dataganj
- Constituency No. 117 for the Uttar Pradesh Legislative Assembly

Constituency details
- Country: India
- Region: North India
- State: Uttar Pradesh
- District: Badaun
- Established: 1956
- Total electors: 389,734 (2017)
- Reservation: None

Member of Legislative Assembly
- 18th Uttar Pradesh Legislative Assembly
- Incumbent Rajeev Kumar Singh
- Party: Bhartiya Janta Party

Dataganj Assembly constituency is one of the 403 constituencies of the Uttar Pradesh Legislative Assembly, India. It is a part of the Badaun district and one of the five assembly constituencies in the Aonla Lok Sabha constituency. First election in this assembly constituency was held in 1957 after the "DPACO (1956)" (delimitation order) was passed in 1956. After the "Delimitation of Parliamentary and Assembly Constituencies Order" was passed in 2008, the constituency was assigned identification number 117.

== Wards / Areas ==
Extent of Dataganj Assembly constituency is KCs Samrer, Dataganj, Hazratpur, Usawan, Alapur NP, Usawan NP, Usehat NP & Dataganj NP of Dataganj Tehsil.

== Members of the Legislative Assembly ==
#	Term	Name	Party	From	To	Days	Comments	Ref
01	01st Vidhan Sabha	-	-	Mar-1952	Mar-1957	1,849	Constituency not in existence	
02	02nd Vidhan Sabha	Harish Chandra Singh	Indian National Congress	Apr-1957	Mar-1962	1,800	-	
03	03rd Vidhan Sabha	Narain Singh	Bharatiya Jana Sangh	Mar-1962	Mar-1967	1,828	-	
04	04th Vidhan Sabha	Harish Chandra Singh	Independent	Mar-1967	Apr-1968	402	-	
05	05th Vidhan Sabha	Tribeni Sahai	Indian National Congress	Feb-1969	Mar-1974	1,832	-	
06	06th Vidhan Sabha	Santosh Kumari	Indian National Congress	Mar-1974	Apr-1977	1,153	-	
07	07th Vidhan Sabha	Avenesh Kumar Singh	Janata Party	Jun-1977	Feb-1980	969	-	
08	08th Vidhan Sabha	Santosh Kumari	Indian National Congress (I)	Jun-1980	Mar-1985	1,735	-	
09	09th Vidhan Sabha	Avenesh Kumar Singh	Bharatiya Janata Party	Mar-1985	Nov-1989	1,725	-	
10	10th Vidhan Sabha	Santosh Kumari Pathak	Indian National Congress	Dec-1989	Apr-1991	488	-	
11	11th Vidhan Sabha	Avenesh Kumar Singh	Bharatiya Janata Party	Jun-1991	Dec-1992	533	-	
12	12th Vidhan Sabha	Avenesh Kumar Singh	Bharatiya Janata Party	Dec-1993	Oct-1995	693	-	
13	13th Vidhan Sabha	Prem Pal Singh Yadav	Samajwadi Party	Oct-1996	May-2002	1,967	-	
14	14th Vidhan Sabha	Prem Pal Singh Yadav	Samajwadi Party	Feb-2002	May-2007	1,902	-	
15	15th Vidhan Sabha	Sinod Kumar Shakya	Bahujan Samaj Party	May-2007	Mar-2012	1,762	-	
16	16th Vidhan Sabha	Sinod Kumar Shakya	Bahujan Samaj Party	Mar-2012	Mar-2017	1,762	-	
17	17th Vidhan Sabha	Rajeev Kumar Singh	Bharatiya Janata Party	Mar-2017	Mar-2022	-	-	
18	18th Vidhan Sabha	Rajeev Kumar Singh	Bharatiya Janata Party	Mar-2022	Incumbent			

== Election results ==
=== 2027 ===
2027 Uttar Pradesh Legislative Assembly election: Dataganj
Party	Candidate	Votes	%	±%
INDIA				
NDA				
BSP				
NOTA	None of the above			
Majority				
Turnout				
gain from		Swing		

=== 2022 ===
2022 Uttar Pradesh Legislative Assembly election: Dataganj
Party	Candidate	Votes	%	±%
BJP	Rajeev Kumar Singh	107,591	45.34	▲10.15
SP	Arjun Singh	98,115	41.35	
BSP	Rachit Gupta	20,571	8.67	▼15.06
INC	Atif Khan	2,413	1.02	▼13.32
NOTA	None of the above	1,463	0.62	▼0.26
Majority		9,476	3.99	▼7.47
Turnout		237,304	58.29	▲0.6
BJP hold		Swing		

=== 2017 ===
Seventeenth Legislative Assembly of Uttar Pradesh

2017 General Elections: Dataganj
Party	Candidate	Votes	%	±%
BJP	Rajeev Kumar Singh	79,110	35.19	
BSP	Sinod Kumar Shakya	53,351	23.73	
LKD	Arjun Singh	39,029	17.36	
INC	Prem Pal Singh Yadav	32,243	14.34	
PECP	Dr Shailesh Pathak	11,064	4.92	
NOTA	None of the above	1,971	0.88	
Majority		25,759	11.46	
Turnout		224,822	57.69	
BJP hold		Swing		

== See also ==
- Aonla Lok Sabha constituency
- Budaun district
- Seventeenth Legislative Assembly of Uttar Pradesh
- Uttar Pradesh Legislative Assembly
- Vidhan Bhawan
