= Brajesh Katheriya =

Indian politician

MLA of Uttar Pradesh Legislative Assembly
- Incumbent
- Assumed office March 2017
- In office March 2012 – March 2017
- Preceded by: Sandhya Katheriya
- Constituency: Kishni (Assembly constituency)

Personal details
- Born: 20 July 1968 (age 58) Mainpuri district
- Party: Samajwadi Party
- Spouse: Neeta Kumari (wife)
- Children: Harsh Vardhan (son) & Akrati Kumari, Anshu Kumari (daughters)
- Parent: Jagdish Singh (father)
- Education: Chhatrapati Shahu Ji Maharaj University
- Profession: Farmer & politician

Brajesh Katheriya is an Indian politician and a member of the Uttar Pradesh Legislative Assembly in India. He represents the Kishni constituency of Uttar Pradesh and is a member of the Samajwadi Party political party.

== Early life and education ==
Brajesh Katheriya was born in Mainpuri district. He holds a Diploma in Engineering and BA degree. Katheriya belongs to the Scheduled caste community.

== Political career ==
Brajesh Katheriya has been a MLA for two terms. He represented the Kishni constituency and is a member of the Samajwadi Party political party.

== Posts held ==
#	From	To	Position	Comments
01	March 2017	Incumbent	Member, 17th Legislative Assembly	
02	March 2012	March 2017	Member, 16th Legislative Assembly	

== See also ==
- Kishni (Assembly constituency)
- Sixteenth Legislative Assembly of Uttar Pradesh
- Uttar Pradesh Legislative Assembly
