= Manish Kumar Jaiswal =

Indian politician

Member of the Uttar Pradesh Legislative Assembly
- Incumbent
- Assumed office March 2022
- Constituency: Padrauna Assembly constituency

Personal details
- Born: 1979 (age 46–47)
- Party: Bharatiya Janata Party
- Education: Allahabad University
- Occupation: Politician

Manish Kumar Jaiswal, alias Mantu (born 1979) is an Indian politician from Uttar Pradesh. He is a member of the Uttar Pradesh Legislative Assembly from Padrauna Assembly constituency in Kushinagar district. He won the 2022 Uttar Pradesh Legislative Assembly election representing the Bharatiya Janata Party.

== Early life and education ==
Jaiswal is from Padrauna, Kushinagar district, Uttar Pradesh. He is the son of Ramnarayan. He graduated in 1998 at a college affiliated with Allahabad University, Allahabad.

== Career ==
Jaiswal won from Padrauna Assembly constituency representing the Bharatiya Janata Party in the 2022 Uttar Pradesh Legislative Assembly election. He polled 114,496 votes and defeated his nearest rival, Vikram Yadav of the Samajwadi Party, by a margin of 42,008 votes. In January 2022, he resigned from the Indian National Congress and joined the BJP. In 2012, he contested from Tamkuhi Raj Assembly constituency on Bahujan Samaj Party ticket but lost.
