= Meerut South Assembly constituency =

Constituency of the Uttar Pradesh legislative assembly in India

Meerut South
- Constituency No. 49 for the Uttar Pradesh Legislative Assembly

Constituency details
- Country: India
- Region: North India
- State: Uttar Pradesh
- District: Meerut
- Total electors: 354,863 (2012)
- Reservation: None

Member of Legislative Assembly
- 18th Uttar Pradesh Legislative Assembly
- Incumbent Somendra Tomar
- Party: Bharatiya Janata Party
- Elected year: 2017

Meerut South Assembly constituency is one of the 403 constituencies of the Uttar Pradesh Legislative Assembly, India. It is a part of the Meerut district and one of the five assembly constituencies in the Meerut Lok Sabha constituency. First election in this assembly constituency was held in 2012 after the "Delimitation of Parliamentary and Assembly Constituencies Order, 2008" was passed and the constituency was constituted in 2008. The constituency is assigned identification number 49.

== Wards / Areas ==
Extent of Meerut South Assembly constituency is KC Meerut, & Ward Nos. 2, 3, 5, 10, 11, 13, 16, 19, 25, 28, 30, 31, 33, 34, 35, 39, 41 & 46 in Meerut (M Corp.) of Meerut Tehsil.

== Members of the Legislative Assembly ==
Year	Member	Party
Till 2012 : Constituency did not exist
2012	Ravindra Bhadana	Bharatiya Janata Party
2017	Somendra Tomar	Bharatiya Janata Party
2022	Somendra Tomar	Bharatiya Janata Party

== Election results ==
=== 2027 ===
2027 Uttar Pradesh Legislative Assembly election: Meerut South
Party	Candidate	Votes	%	±%
INDIA				
NDA				
BSP				
NOTA	None of the above			
Majority				
Turnout				
gain from		Swing		

=== 2022 ===
>

2022 Uttar Pradesh Legislative Assembly election: Meerut South
Party	Candidate	Votes	%	±%
BJP	Somendra Tomar	129,667	43.46	+1.65
SP	Mohd Aadil Chaudhary	121,725	40.79	
BSP	Kunwar Dilshad Ali	39,857	13.36	−15.38
NOTA	None of the above	1,139	0.38	−0.14
Majority		7,942	2.67	−10.4
Turnout		298,393	61.99	−1.15
BJP hold		Swing	-10.43%	

=== 2017 ===
2017 Uttar Pradesh Legislative Assembly election: Meerut South
Party	Candidate	Votes	%	±%
BJP	Somendra Tomar	113,225	41.81	
BSP	Haji Mohammad Yaqub	77,830	28.74	
INC	Mohammad Azad Saifi	69,117	25.52	
RLD	Pappu Gurjar	5,462	2.02	
NOTA	None of the above	1,401	0.52	
Majority		35,395	13.07	
Turnout		270,796	63.14	
BJP hold		Swing	+8.6%	

=== 2012 ===
2012 Uttar Pradesh Legislative Assembly election: Meerut South
Party	Candidate	Votes	%	±%
BJP	Ravindra Kumar Bhadana	71,584	32.79	−
BSP	Haji Rashid Akhlaq	61,800	28.31	−
SP	Mohd Aadil Chaudhary	49,103	22.49	−
	Remainder 13 candidates	35,817	16.39	−
Majority		9,784	4.48	−
Turnout		218,304	61.52	−
BJP hold		Swing	New Seat	

== See also ==
- Meerut district
- Meerut Lok Sabha constituency
- Sixteenth Legislative Assembly of Uttar Pradesh
- Uttar Pradesh Legislative Assembly
