= Shyam Bihari Lal =

Indian politician (1966–2026)

Professor, Dr. Shyam Bihari Lal

Member of 18th Uttar Pradesh Assembly
- In office 2022 – 2 January 2026
- Preceded by: himself
- Constituency: Faridpur

Member of 17th Uttar Pradesh Assembly
- In office 2017–2022
- Preceded by: Siyaram Sagar
- Succeeded by: himself
- Constituency: Faridpur

Personal details
- Born: 1 January 1966 Bareilly, Uttar Pradesh, India
- Died: 2 January 2026 (aged 60) Bareilly, Uttar Pradesh, India
- Citizenship: India
- Party: Bharatiya Janata Party
- Spouse: Manju Lata
- Children: 1 son 2 daughters
- Parent: Radheshyam (Father)
- Education: Post graduate MA, PhD
- Occupation: MLA
- Profession: Politician; Teaching

Shyam Bihari Lal (1 January 1966 – 2 January 2026) was an Indian politician. He represented the Faridpur Assembly constituency in Bareilly district of Uttar Pradesh. He was twice MLA from Faridpur.

== Early life and education ==
Lal was born in Bareilly of Uttar Pradesh. He was married and had a son and two daughters. Lal was a postgraduate and also completed his Ph.D.

== Political career ==
Lal won the 2022 Uttar Pradesh Legislative Assembly Election defeating Vijay Pal Singh of the Samajwadi Party by a margin of 2921 votes.

== Death ==
Lal died from a heart attack in Bareilly, Uttar Pradesh on 2 January 2026, a day after his 60th birthday.
