= Boublil =

Boublil is a common Mizrahi Jewish surname. It may refer to:

- Alain Boublil, (born 1941), French musical theatre lyricist and librettist
- Alain Boublil (born 1947), discredited French commissioner and presidential aid
- Daniel Boublil, French lyricist in musical comedies
- Max Boublil (born 1979), French comedian, singer and film / TV actor
- Shon Boublil (born 1993), Canadian guitarist
