= Siyaram Sagar =

Indian politician

Siyaram Sagar सियाराम सागर

MLA, Legislative Assembly of Uttar Pradesh
- In office March 2012 – March 2017
- Preceded by: Vijay Pal Singh
- Succeeded by: Dr Shyam Bihari Lal
- In office February 2002 – May 2007
- Preceded by: Nand Ram
- Succeeded by: Vijay Pal Singh
- In office December 1993 – October 1995
- Preceded by: Nand Ram
- Succeeded by: Nand Ram
- In office December 1989 – April 1991
- Preceded by: Nathu Lal Vikal
- Succeeded by: Nand Ram
- In office June 1977 – February 1980
- Preceded by: Hem Raj
- Succeeded by: Nand Ram
- Constituency: Faridpur

Personal details
- Born: 7 July 1945 (age 81) Bareilly district
- Died: 14 July 2019 Bareilly
- Party: Samajwadi Party
- Other political affiliations: Janata Party
- Spouse: Anita Devi (wife)
- Children: 3 sons and 1 daughter
- Parent: Ram Baksh Prasad Sagar (father)
- Education: The Calcutta Homoeopathic Medical College and Hospital
- Profession: Medical professional and Politician

Siyaram Sagar (Hindi: सियाराम सागर) is an Indian politician and a member of the Sixteenth Legislative Assembly of Uttar Pradesh in India. He represents the Faridpur constituency of Uttar Pradesh and is a member of the Samajwadi Party political party.

== Early life and education ==
Siyaram Sagar was born in Bareilly district. He attended the Calcutta Homeopathic Medical College and Hospital and attained a Bachelor's degree. He is a homeopathic doctor by profession. Sagar belongs to the scheduled caste community.

== Political career ==
Siyaram Sagar has been a MLA for five terms. He represented the Faridpur constituency and is a member of the Samajwadi Party political party.

He lost his seat in the 2017 Uttar Pradesh Assembly election to Shyam Bihari Lal of the Bharatiya Janata Party.

== Posts held ==
#	From	To	Position	Comments
01	2012	2017	Member, 16th Legislative Assembly	
02	2002	2007	Member, 14th Legislative Assembly	
03	1993	1995	Member, 12th Legislative Assembly	
04	1989	1991	Member, 10th Legislative Assembly	Independent candidate.
05	1977	1980	Member, 07th Legislative Assembly	Was a member of Janata Party

== See also ==
- Faridpur (Assembly constituency)
- Sixteenth Legislative Assembly of Uttar Pradesh
- Uttar Pradesh Legislative Assembly
