= Pradeep Kumar Dubey =

Indian civil servant

Pradeep Kumar Dubey प्रदीप कुमार दुबे
- Born: 15 April 1957 (age 68); Etawah, Uttar Pradesh, India
- Education: Bachelor of Laws & Master of Arts
- Occupation: Judicial Officer - (HJS)
- Years active: 2007-present
- Employer: Government of Uttar Pradesh
- Known for: Principal secretary of Uttar Pradesh Legislative Assembly

Pradeep Kumar Dubey (Hindi: प्रदीप कुमार दुबे) is a Judicial officer and the Principal Secretary (HJS) of Uttar Pradesh Legislative Assembly. Dubey joined Uttar Pradesh Judicial Services - PCS(J) in Aug 1987. Before taking charge as the principal secretary, he served as the legal adviser to the Governor of Uttar Pradesh.

== Early life and education ==
Pradeep Kumar Dubey was born in Etawah, Uttar Pradesh in 1957. He attained Bachelor of Laws -LL.B(Delhi University), and Master of Arts degree -M.A.(Allahabad University).

== Career ==
In Aug 1987, Pradeep Kumar Dubey joined the Uttar Pradesh Judicial Services and served as a judicial magistrate from 1987 to 1994. He subsequently was appointed as the legal adviser to the legal adviser to the Governor of Uttar Pradesh. In Jun 2011, Dubey was appointed as the principal secretary of Uttar Pradesh Legislative Assembly in the Sixteenth Legislative Assembly of Uttar Pradesh.

POSITIONS HELD

Joined U.P. Judicial Service in the month of August 1987.

Worked as Judicial Magistrate and Munsif Magistrate/Civil Judge from 1987 to 1991 at Lucknow, Civil Courts.

Posted as Judicial Magistrate from 1991 to 1994 at Allahabad.

Legal Advisor/ Additional Legal Advisor to His Excellency the Governor of Uttar Pradesh from September 1994 to November 2006.

Additional District Judge at Basti and Barabanki from February 2007 to July 2007 in the Cadre of Higher Judicial Service.

Posted as Secretary, Parliamentary Affairs in the Govt. of U.P. in July 2007 on deputation.

Appointed as Principal Secretary, Parliamentary Affairs in the Govt. of U.P. in January 2009.

Additional charge of Legal Advisor to the Governor along with Secretary, Parliamentary Affairs since July, 2007 to 12 January 2009.

PRESENT POSITION

Principal Secretary, Vidhan Sabha (Legislative Assembly), Uttar Pradesh since June, 2011.

== See also ==
- Government of Uttar Pradesh
- Sixteenth Legislative Assembly of Uttar Pradesh
- Uttar Pradesh Legislative Assembly
