= List of leaders of the opposition in the Uttar Pradesh Legislative Assembly =

Leader of the Official Opposition in the Legislative Assembly of Uttar Pradesh

Leader of the Opposition of Uttar Pradesh Legislative Assembly
- Seal of the Government of Uttar Pradesh
- Incumbent; Mata Prasad Pandey since 28 July 2024
- Style: The Honourable
- Type: Leader of the Opposition
- Status: Leader of the opposition alliance or the main opposition party in the Legislative Assembly
- Member of: Uttar Pradesh Legislative Assembly
- Reports to: Vidhan Sabha
- Residence: 1, Vikramaditya Marg, Lucknow
- Seat: Vidhan Bhawan, Lucknow
- Nominator: Members of the Official Opposition of the Legislative Assembly
- Appointer: Speaker of the Assembly
- Term length: 5 years Till the Assembly continues
- Inaugural holder: Muhammad Ahmad Said Khan (Nawaab Chhatari) (1937 - 1939)
- Formation: 12 January 1937; 89 years ago
- Deputy: Deputy Leader of Opposition
- Website: Uttar Pradesh Legislative Assembly

The leader of the opposition in the Uttar Pradesh Legislative Assembly is the politician who leads the official opposition in the Uttar Pradesh Legislative Assembly.

== Eligibility ==
Official Opposition is a term used in Uttar Pradesh Legislative Assembly to designate the political party which has secured the second largest number of seats in the assembly. In order to get formal recognition, the party must have at least 10% of total membership of the Legislative Assembly. A single party has to meet the 10% seat criterion, not an alliance. Many of the Indian state legislatures also follow this 10% rule while the rest of them prefer single largest opposition party according to the rules of their respective houses.

== Role ==
The opposition's main role is to question the government of the day and hold them accountable to the public. The opposition is equally responsible in upholding the best interests of the people of the country. They have to ensure that the Government does not take any steps, which might have negative effects on the people of the country.

The role of the opposition in legislature is basically to check the excesses of the ruling or dominant party, and not to be totally antagonistic. There are actions of the ruling party which may be beneficial to the masses and opposition is expected to support such steps.

In legislature, opposition party has a major role and must act to discourage the party in power from acting against the interests of the country and the common man. They are expected to alert the population and the Government on the content of any bill, which is not in the best interests of the country.

== List of leaders of the opposition of Uttar Pradesh ==
No	Portrait	Name	Constituency	Tenure			Assembly	Party
1		Muhammad Ahmad Said Khan		12 January 1937	14 January 1939	2 years, 2 days	1st (1937)	Independent
2		Chaudhry Khaliquzzaman		15 January 1939	8 September 1945	6 years, 236 days	1st (1937)	Muslim League
3		Jahirul Hasnain Lari		12 April 1946	14 June 1950	4 years, 63 days	2nd (1946)	Muslim League
4		Triloki Singh		27 June 1950	6 May 1952	1 year, 314 days	2nd (1946)	Bharatiya Jan Congress
After independence
5		Raj Narain	Banaras South	16 May 1952	17 August 1955	3 years, 93 days	1st (1952)	Socialist Party
6		Genda Singh	Padrauna East	17 August 1955	31 March 1957	1 year, 226 days	1st (1952)	Praja Socialist Party
(4)		Triloki Singh	Lucknow East	12 April 1957	6 March 1962	4 years, 328 days	2nd (1957)	Praja Socialist Party
7		Yadavendra Dutt Dubey	Jaunpur	28 March 1962	2 February 1964	1 year, 311 days	3rd (1962)	Bharatiya Jana Sangh
8		Sharda Bhukt Singh	Sitapur	2 February 1964	2 April 1965	1 year, 59 days	3rd (1962)	Bharatiya Jana Sangh
9		Madhav Prasad Tripathi	Banganga West	2 April 1965	9 March 1967	1 year, 341 days	3rd (1962)	Bharatiya Jana Sangh
10		Ram Chandra Vikal	Dadri	2 March 1967	2 April 1967	31 days	3rd (1962)	Indian National Congress
11		Chandra Bhanu Gupta	Ranikhet	2 April 1967	15 April 1968	1 year, 13 days	4th (1967)	Indian National Congress
12		Charan Singh	Chhaprauli	2 March 1969	2 February 1970	337 days	5th (1969)	Bharatiya Kranti Dal
13		Choudhri Girdhari Lal	Afzalgarh	26 February 1970	3 October 1970	219 days	5th (1969)	Indian National Congress (O)
14		Kamalapati Tripathi	Chandauli	19 October 1970	4 April 1971	167 days	5th (1969)	Indian National Congress
(13)		Choudhri Girdhari Lal	Afzalgarh	5 April 1971	3 January 1972	273 days	5th (1969)	Indian National Congress (O)
(12)		Charan Singh	Chhaprauli	3 January 1972	2 February 1972	30 days	5th (1969)	Bharatiya Kranti Dal
(13)		Choudhri Girdhari Lal	Afzalgarh	22 February 1972	5 May 1972	73 days	5th (1969)	Indian National Congress (O)
15		Jai Ram Varma	Kunda	11 January 1973	13 June 1973	153 days	5th (1969)	Bharatiya Kranti Dal
(12)		Charan Singh	Chhaprauli	10 December 1973	4 March 1974	3 years, 95 days	5th (1969)	Bharatiya Kranti Dal
(12)		Charan Singh	Chhaprauli	17 March 1974	30 March 1977	3 years, 95 days	6th (1974)	Bharatiya Lok Dal
16		Satya Prakash Malaviya	Allahabad South	30 March 1977	30 April 1977	31 days	6th (1974)	Bharatiya Lok Dal
17		N. D. Tiwari	Kashipur	24 June 1977	17 March 1978	1 year, 251 days	7th (1977)	Indian National Congress
17		N. D. Tiwari	Kashipur	12 October 1978	28 August 1979	1 year, 251 days	7th (1977)	Indian National Congress
18		Raj Mangal Pande	Bhatpar Rani	28 August 1979	17 February 1980	173 days	7th (1977)	Janata Vidhayak Dal
19		Rajendra Singh	Iglas	20 June 1980	10 March 1985	4 years, 263 days	8th (1980)	Janata Party (Secular)
20		Mulayam Singh Yadav	Jaswantnagar	17 March 1985	10 February 1987	1 year, 330 days	9th (1985)	Lokdal
21		Satyapal Singh Yadav	Tilhar	21 February 1987	21 November 1989	2 years, 273 days	9th (1985)	Lokdal
(17)		N. D. Tiwari	Haldwani	7 December 1989	4 April 1991	1 year, 118 days	10th (1989)	Indian National Congress
22		Kailash Nath Singh Yadav	Dhanapur	17 July 1991	6 December 1991	142 days	11th (1991)	Janata Dal
23		Rewati Raman Singh	Karchana	6 December 1991	6 December 1992	1 year, 0 days	11th (1991)	Janata Dal
24		Kalyan Singh	Atrauli	4 July 1993	12 June 1995	1 year, 343 days	12th (1993)	Bharatiya Janata Party
(20)		Mulayam Singh Yadav	Jaswantnagar	4 July 1995	1 June 1996	333 days	12th (1993)	Samajwadi Party
25		Dhaniram Verma	Bidhuna	21 April 1997	15 September 2001	4 years, 147 days	13th (1996)	Samajwadi Party
26		Swami Prasad Maurya	Dalmau	18 September 2001	17 October 2001	29 days	13th (1996)	Bahujan Samaj Party
27		Azam Khan	Rampur	13 May 2002	29 August 2003	1 year, 108 days	14th (2002)	Samajwadi Party
(26)		Swami Prasad Maurya	Dalmau	30 August 2003	7 September 2003	8 days	14th (2002)	Bahujan Samaj Party
28		Lalji Tandon	Lucknow West	7 September 2003	13 May 2007	3 years, 248 days	14th (2002)	Bharatiya Janata Party
(20)		Mulayam Singh Yadav	Bharthana	14 May 2007	26 May 2009	2 years, 12 days	15th (2007)	Samajwadi Party
29		Shivpal Singh Yadav	Jaswantnagar	26 May 2009	9 March 2012	2 years, 288 days	15th (2007)	Samajwadi Party
(26)		Swami Prasad Maurya	Padrauna	16 March 2012	26 June 2016	4 years, 102 days	16th (2012)	Bahujan Samaj Party
30		Gaya Charan Dinkar	Naraini	27 June 2016	17 March 2017	263 days	16th (2012)	Bahujan Samaj Party
31		Ram Govind Chaudhary	Bansdih	27 March 2017	10 March 2022	4 years, 348 days	17th (2017)	Samajwadi Party
32		Akhilesh Yadav	Karhal	26 March 2022	11 June 2024	2 years, 77 days	18th (2022)	Samajwadi Party
33		Mata Prasad Pandey	Itwa	28 July 2024	Incumbent	2 years, 41 days	18th (2022)	Samajwadi Party

== See also ==
- Government of Uttar Pradesh
- Governor of Uttar Pradesh
- Chief Minister of Uttar Pradesh
- Uttar Pradesh Legislative Assembly
- Uttar Pradesh Council of Ministers
- Allahabad High Court#List of chief justices
- Leader of the Opposition in the Parliament of India
- List of current Indian opposition leaders
