= Shon Boublil =

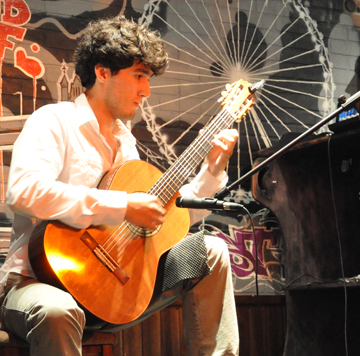
- Shon Boublil
- Born: June 19, 1993 (age 32)
- Citizenship: Canadian
- Education: Berklee College of Music (B.Mus.); Concordia University (B.Sc.); Université Laval (M.Sc.); University of Western Australia (Ph.D.)
- Occupations: Guitarist, Physicist, Professor
- Employer: Université TÉLUQ
- Known for: Winner of Six String Theory International Guitar Competition (2010); Research on Einsteinian physics education
- Notable work: Six String Theory (2010); Eyes Up (2014); Experiment (2017)

Shon Boublil (born June 19, 1993) is a Canadian guitarist and physicist. He first gained international recognition after winning the Lee Ritenour Six String Theory International Guitar Competition in 2010, which led to collaborations with prominent jazz and classical musicians. Boublil later pursued an academic career in physics, earning a PhD at the University of Western Australia with research on Einsteinian physics education. He is currently a professor of science education at Université TÉLUQ in Québec.

== Name ==
Boublil is professionally known as Shon Boublil in his musical career. In academic publications, he is credited under the name Shachar Boublil or Shachar Shon Boublil.

== Early life and education ==
Boublil grew up in Montreal, where he studied classical and jazz guitar. He attended École F.A.C.E. and participated in several competitions. In 2010, he won the Canadian Music Competition in the guitar category, as well as the Montreal International Classical Guitar Competition. He was also a finalist in the Grand Prix de Guitare à Montréal and the Schwob Guitar Competition in Atlanta.

Boublil earned a Bachelor of Music from the Berklee College of Music in Boston (2010–2014), after receiving a four‑year scholarship as part of his Six String Theory competition prize. He later earned a Bachelor’s degree in physics from Concordia University and a Master’s from Université Laval. He completed his PhD at the University of Western Australia, focusing on Einsteinian physics education, and became a member of the Australian Research Council Centre of Excellence for Gravitational Wave Discovery (OzGrav) and the Einstein-First project.

== Musical career ==
Boublil’s breakthrough came in 2010 when he won the Six String Theory competition. As part of the prize, he recorded with artists such as Lee Ritenour, John Scofield, and George Benson.

=== Discography ===
- Six String Theory (2010) – Compilation album featuring Boublil alongside established guitarists.
- Eyes Up (2014) – Covers with other Berklee graduates.
- Experiment (2017) – Compilation of original tunes.

== Academic career ==
Boublil’s doctoral research at UWA centered on Einsteinian physics education.

He has published peer‑reviewed articles on Einsteinian energy and gravity education, including:

- Design and Implementation of an Einsteinian Energy Learning Module (2023), co‑authored with David Blair and David Treagust.
- Einsteinian gravity and energy in school: Design, implementation, and evaluation of teaching resources (2023).

Boublil is currently a professor of science education at Université TÉLUQ in Québec.

== Recognition ==
- Winner, Six String Theory International Guitar Competition (2010)
- Winner, Canadian Music Competition (2010)
