= Sinod Kumar Shakya =

Indian politician

MLA, Legislative Assembly of Uttar Pradesh
- In office March 2012 – March 2017
- Succeeded by: Rajeev Kumar Singh
- In office May 2007 – March 2012
- Preceded by: Prem Pal Singh Yadav
- Constituency: Dataganj

Personal details
- Born: 13 August 1976 (age 50) Budaun district
- Party: Bharatiya Janata Party
- Parent: Rameshwar Dayal (father)
- Education: Not known
- Profession: Farmer & politician

Sinod Kumar Shakya is an Indian politician and a member of the Sixteenth Legislative Assembly of Uttar Pradesh in India. He is the former MLA of Dataganj constituency of Uttar Pradesh and is a member of the Bhartiya Janta Party political party.

== Early life and education ==
Sinod Kumar Shakya was born in Budaun district. He is educated till twelfth grade (alma mater not known).

== Political career ==
Sinod Kumar Shakya has been a MLA for two terms. He represented the Dataganj constituency and is a member of the Bahujan Samaj Party political party.

He lost his seat in the 2017 Uttar Pradesh Assembly election to Rajeev Kumar Singh of the Bharatiya Janata Party by huge margin of 25,759 votes.

== Posts held ==
#	From	To	Position	Comments
01	March 2012	March 2017	Member, 16th Legislative Assembly	
02	May 2007	March 2012	Member, 15th Legislative Assembly	

== See also ==
- Dataganj (Assembly constituency)
- Sixteenth Legislative Assembly of Uttar Pradesh
- Uttar Pradesh Legislative Assembly
