= Swami Prasad Maurya =

Indian politician (born 1954)

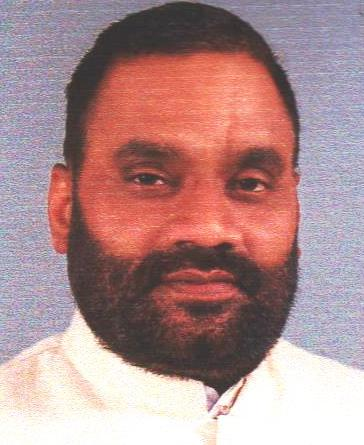

National President, Apni Janta Party
- Incumbent
- Assumed office March 2025

Minister of Labour, Employment, Coordination in Government of Uttar Pradesh
- In office 19 March 2017 – 11 January 2022
- Chief Minister: Yogi Adityanath

Member of Legislative Council
- In office 2007 – 2009 (Res. Won by-election)
- In office 2022 – 2024 (Resigned, Feb-2024)
- Constituency: elected by Legislative Assembly members

Leader of the Opposition in the Uttar Pradesh Legislative Assembly
- In office 18 Sep 2001 – 17 Oct 2001
- In office 16 March 2012 – 26 June 2016

Leader of the House for Uttar Pradesh Legislative Assembly
- In office 2002–2003

MLA, Legislative Assembly of Uttar Pradesh
- In office March 2017 – March 2022
- In office March 2012 – March 2017
- In office August 2009 – March 2012
- Preceded by: Ratanjit Pratap Narain Singh
- Succeeded by: Manish Jaiswal
- Constituency: Padrauna (Vidhan Sabha constituency)
- In office March 2002 – May 2007
- Succeeded by: Ajay Pal Singh
- In office October 1996 – March 2002
- Preceded by: Gajhadar Singh
- Constituency: Dalmau

Personal details
- Born: 2 January 1954 (age 72) Pratapgarh, Uttar Pradesh, India
- Party: Apni Janta Party (2025–present)
- Other political affiliations: Lok Dal (1980–91); Janata Dal (1991–96); Bahujan Samaj Party (1996–2016); Bharatiya Janata Party (2016–2022); Samajwadi Party (2022–2024); Rashtriya Shoshit Samaj Party (2024-2025)
- Spouse: Shiva Maurya
- Children: Sanghmitra Maurya and Utkrist Maurya
- Parent(s): Badlu Maurya and Jagannath Maurya
- Education: Allahabad University
- Profession: Lawyer; Agriculturist
- Website: www.swamiprasadmaurya.com

Swami Prasad Maurya (born 2 January 1954) is an Indian politician and was a member of the 17th Legislative Assembly of Uttar Pradesh of India. He represented the Padrauna constituency of Uttar Pradesh. He was a member of Samajwadi Party till 2024 to which he resigned. Maurya has been a Member of the legislative assembly for five terms, has been a minister in the government of Uttar Pradesh, Leader of the house and Leader of the opposition. He was serving as Cabinet Minister for Labour, Employment and Co-ordination in Yogi Adityanath ministry. Until January 2022, he was a member of the Bharatiya Janata Party which he joined after a long stint with Bahujan Samaj Party.

== Early life and education ==
Swami Prasad Maurya was born on 2 January 1954 in a Hindu family of Chakwadh, Pratapgarh, Uttar Pradesh to Badlu Maurya and Jagannathi Maurya. He is married to Shiva Maurya, with whom he has a son and a daughter. His daughter, Sanghmitra Maurya is a Member of Parliament, Lok Sabha from Budaun. He attended the Allahabad University and attained Bachelor of Laws and Master of Arts degrees.

== Political career ==
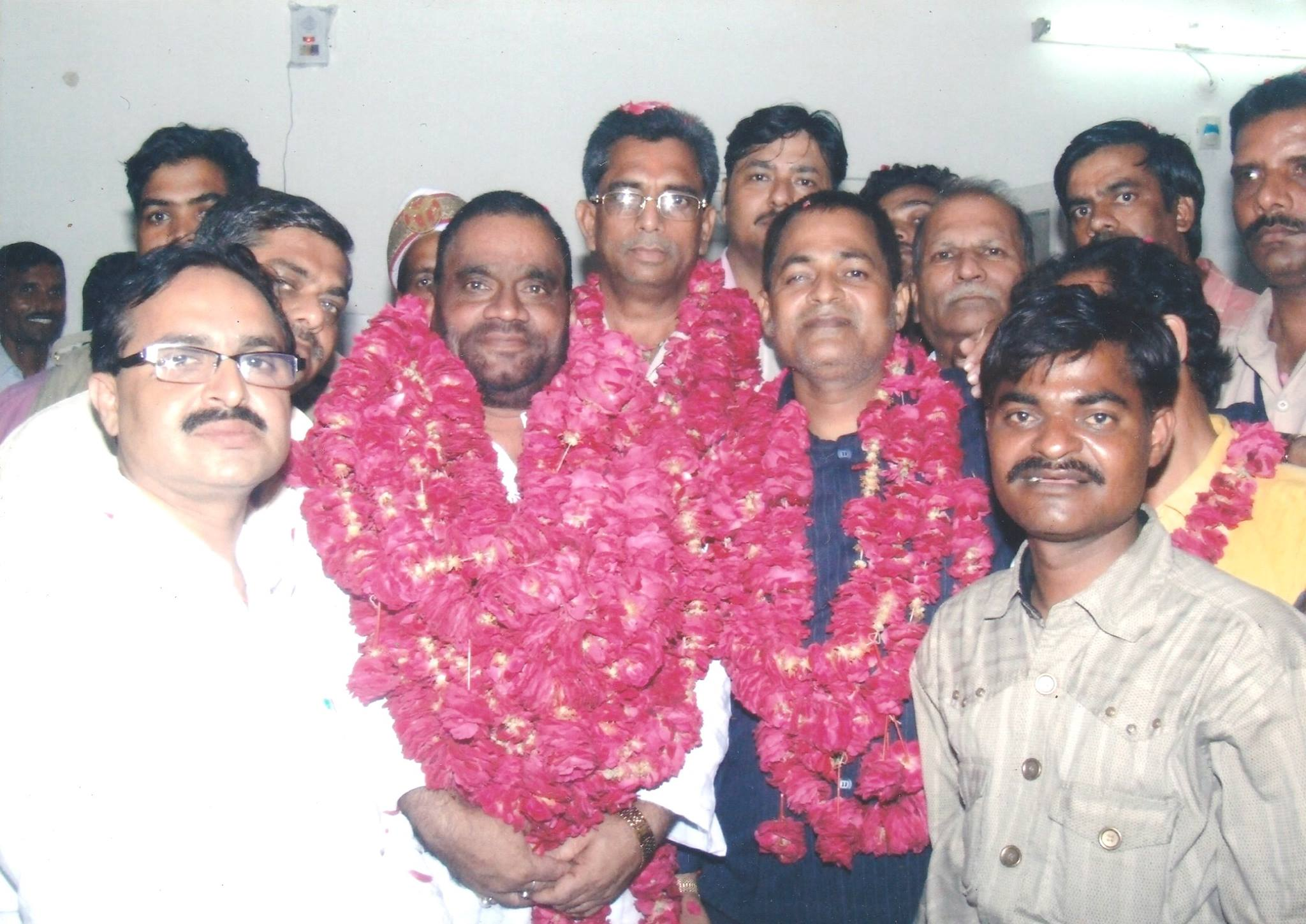
Swami Prasad Maurya, during his initial days with Bahujan Samaj Party with party workers.

Maurya has been a MLA for five terms. He represented the Padrauna constituency and was a member of the Bhartiya Janata Party political party. He was previously a member of Bahujan Samaj Party and was elected to the assembly as a member of BSP. Maurya served as the president of the Uttar Pradesh unit of the BSP from 2008 to 2012, when he was replaced as unit president by Ram Achal Rajbhar. On 22 June 2016, Maurya resigned from all party posts alleging a "money for ticket" syndicate being run by the party, this claim was later denied by the BSP supremo Mayawati in a press conference on the same day, where she thanked Maurya for doing courtesy on the party for leaving on his own, otherwise he was about to be expelled for promoting dynastic politics within BSP.

In July 2016, Maurya announced the formation of his organisational unit called Loktantrik Bahujan Manch which launched at Lucknow's Ramabai Ambedkar Rally Ground.

In March 2017, he was appointed Cabinet Minister in Uttar Pradesh Government. He got ministries of Labour and Employment exchanges, Urban Employment and Poverty alleviation in Yogi Adityanath ministry.

On 21 August 2019, after the first cabinet expansion of Yogi Adityanath his ministry department changed to Minister of Labour, Employment, Co-ordination.

On 11 January 2022, Swami gave a huge setback to Bhartiya Janta Party (BJP), by resigning from the post of cabinet minister of the Yogi Adityanath ministry and as well as from BJP just a month before the assembly elections. He said that BJP has done injustice to almost all sections of society, such as, why he resigned. BJP claims that he resigned since he was told that his son will not get a Member of the Legislative Assembly (MLA) ticket from BJP for the 2022 Uttar Pradesh Legislative Assembly election.

Maurya joined Samajwadi Party in January 2022, but was denied ticket from his stronghold Padrauna, instead was asked to fight from Fazilnagar, which he subsequently lost in the 2022 Uttar Pradesh Legislative Assembly election against BJP's Surendra Kumar Kushwaha. Before 2022 Assembly elections, The Wire undertook a ground reporting in the several villages of Fazilnagar Assembly constituency for knowing the public opinion and tracking voting behaviour by various communities. It was reported that the deputy CM of Uttar Pradesh, Keshav Prasad Maurya had conducted a massive rally in the constituency to mobilize the voters to vote for Bhartiya Janata Party's candidate. The survey, however, presented a mixed opinion of various communities in the constituency. In the village dominated by Muslims, voters expressed faith in the Samajwadi Party, but many of them were observed to be supporters of Ilyas Ansari— the former district president of Samajwadi Party, who was denied a ticket from Fazilnagar to accommodate Swami Prasad Maurya in this consistency. Ansari was contesting as a candidate of Bahujan Samaj Party now. Some of the voters surveyed in a Kushwaha caste-dominated village opined that BJP candidate Surendra Singh Kushwaha— the son of former MLA Ganga Singh Kushwaha was not preferred by the voters from his community, but many others expressed faith in BJP. It was reported that, in this constituency, after the Mandal movement of the 1990s, landed OBC castes like Yadavs and Kushwaha had become dominant and BJP had been mobilizing non-Yadav OBCs along with upper castes to create a robust vote base. Besides this, the Muslim votes polled in favour of Bahujan Samaj Party candidate Ilyas Ansari was also making the BJP candidate's position strong as compared to Maurya. After the counting of votes, before the polls, Surendra Kumar Kushwaha secured 1,16,029 votes, while Maurya attained the second position, logging in 71,015 votes. Meanwhile, BSP candidate Ansari grabbed 28,237 votes.

After joining the Samajwadi Party before the 2022 elections to the Uttar Pradesh Legislative Assembly, Maurya was made General Secretary of the party. In January 2023, Maurya commented on the use of objectionable language in Hindu text, Ramcharitmanas about the women, Dalits and Tribals and subsequently demanded that religious authorities should consider eradication of the alleged undignified text from the same. In July 2023, amidst controversy over the existence of a temple below Gyanvapi mosque, Maurya alleged BJP of bringing controversial issues on the political front to polarise various religions for political gains. He further said that Archaeological Survey of India should also investigate to find whether a Buddhist monastery existed below a temple or not. According to Maurya, most of the Hindu temples in India were built after demolishing the Buddhist monasteries. Maurya also said that till the 8th century, the popular Hindu pilgrimage site Badrinath was a Buddhist mutt. This statement was criticised by the former Chief Minister of Uttar Pradesh Mayawati, who accused Maurya of creating a wedge between the communities.

In August 2023, Swami Prasad Maurya made a statement, that there are three seats of power in the country and they all work in tandem to exploit the country. He identified these three seats of power as Raj Gaddi (the office of Chief Minister and Prime Minister), the Seth Gaddi (identified with big business houses of India), and Mutt Gaddi (the seat of Shankaracharya and other seers). Maurya said that if any one of these comes in danger, the other two seats rescue it. In an interview with Press Trust of India, he alleged that BJP identifies Hinduism with Brahminism, which is a religion followed by ten percent people of India. He also said that the latter had neglected the Tribals, Scheduled Castes and Other Backward Class time and again. While talking to PTI, he affirmed his faith in a coalition of opposition parties called INDIA, that it would be able to defeat BJP led National Democratic Alliance in the 2024 Lok Sabha elections.

Swami Prasad Maurya became member of Uttar Pradesh Legislative Council in January 2022 resigned as MLC and from the primary membership of Samajwadi Party on 20 February 2024. At New Delhi on 22 February 2024, he elected as president of the Rashtriya Shoshit Samaj Party.

== Posts held ==
#	From	To	Position	Comments
01	Oct-1996	Mar-2002	Member, 13th Legislative Assembly	
02	Mar-1997	Oct-1997	Cabinet Minister in the Government of Uttar Pradesh	
03	Sep-2001	Oct-2001	Leader of the opposition, Uttar Pradesh Legislative Assembly	
04	Mar-2002	May-2007	Member, 14th Legislative Assembly	
05	May-2002	Aug-2003	Cabinet Minister in the Government of Uttar Pradesh	
06	May-2002	Aug-2003	Leader of the House, Uttar Pradesh Legislative Assembly	
07	Aug-2003	Sep-2003	Leader of the opposition, Uttar Pradesh Legislative Assembly	
08	May 2007	Nov-2009	Cabinet Minister in the Government of Uttar Pradesh	
09	Nov-2009	Mar-2012	Member, 15th Legislative Assembly	
10	November 2007	March 2012	Cabinet Minister in Smt. Mayawati Cabinet	
11	March 2012	March 2017	Member, 16th Legislative Assembly, from Padrauna	
12	March 2012	June 2016	Leader of the opposition, Uttar Pradesh Legislative Assembly	Resigned
13	March 2017	January 2022	Member, 17th Legislative Assembly of Uttar Pradesh	
14	March 2017	January 2022	Cabinet Minister for Labour, Employment, Coordination.	Resigned

== Personal life ==
His daughter, Sanghmitra Maurya, was elected to Lok Sabha in 2019 General Elections, while his son Utkrisht Maurya is also a politician who unsuccessfully contested Assembly elections twice from Unchahar Raebareli.

In 2024, Maurya and his daughter Sanghmitra were declared absconding by a court in Uttar Pradesh in a matter related to marital dispute of Sanghmitra. A complainant named Deepak Kumar Swarnkar alleged that he was in relationship with Sanghmitra since 2016 and married her in 2019. He also alleged Maurya and her daughter for assaulting him.

In August 2024, Supreme Court of India stayed the criminal proceedings against Maurya and his daughter in this marital dispute case. Maurya had earlier moved to Supreme Court against the decision of Lucknow Bench of Allahabad High Court, which decreed to initiate a criminal proceeding against him and his daughter in this marital dispute case.

== Controversies ==
Swami Prasad Maurya had alleged about some verses of the Hindu religious text Ramcharitmanas that the Shudra caste has been degraded in it. He said that such verses should be banned and he would burn the book, on which Ramcharitmanas was burnt by his supporters, in response to this, he was lashed by all the Hindu organisations, as well as VHP. VHP burnt his effigy and also demanded to arrest him for the sacrilege of Ramcharitmanas. Later, he was promoted to the post of General Secretary of Samajwadi Party by Akhilesh Yadav. When the dissent erupted the Party distanced itself from Maurya saying that were personal remarks and had nothing to relate with the party. VHP also demanded the Election Commission of India to de-list Samajwadi Party and lodged an FIR against him.

In February 2023, after the Ramcharitmanas controversy, the supporters of Maurya heckled Mahant Rajudas, a priest who had announced a bounty of 21 lakh on Maurya's head earlier. In the allegations and counter-allegations, which led to an exchange of blows between the priests and Maurya's supporters, Rajudas stated that the supporters of Maurya called him a "Saffron Terrorist". While Maurya accused Mahant Rajudas of plotting to kill him. He also charged allegations upon them of keeping deadly weapons and attacking him, to which, his supporters gave befitting reply.

Maurya was also criticised by some of the leaders of the Samajwadi Party itself, because of his stand on the Ramcharitmanas. However, the party in a press note released later, announced the expulsion of those leaders from the SP, who criticized Maurya. These leaders included two women veterans of the party, Richa Singh and Roli Tiwari Mishra.

== See also ==
- Dinanath Bhaskar
