= Abhay Narayan =

Indian politician

MLA, 16th Legislative Assembly
- In office March 2012 – March 2017
- Preceded by: Sarvesh Kumar Singh
- Succeeded by: Bandana Singh
- Constituency: Sagri

Personal details
- Born: 15 January 1957 (age 69) Azamgarh, Uttar Pradesh
- Citizenship: India
- Party: Samajwadi Party
- Spouse: Ekmi Singh
- Children: 3
- Parent: Dalip Chand (father)
- Occupation: Agricultural
- Profession: Politician

Abhay Narayan is an Indian politician and a member of the 16th Legislative Assembly of Uttar Pradesh of India. He represents the Sagri constituency of Uttar Pradesh and is a member of the Samajwadi Party.

== Early life and education ==
Abhay Narayan was born in Azamgarh, Uttar Pradesh. He holds a Bachelor's degree.

== Political career ==
Abhay Narayan has been a MLA for one term. He represented the Sagri constituency and is a member of the Samajwadi Party.

== Posts Held ==
#	From	To	Position	Comments
01	March 2012	March 2017	Member, 16th Legislative Assembly	

== See also ==
- Sagri
- Politics of India
- Sixteenth Legislative Assembly of Uttar Pradesh
- Uttar Pradesh Legislative Assembly
