= Babulal Patodi =

- Born: 15 June 1920; Sumtha, Indore, Madhya Pradesh, India
- Died: 25 January 2012 (aged 91); Indore, Madhya Pradesh, India
- Resting place: 84 Gumashta Nagar, Indore, Madhya Pradesh, India; 22°44′44″N 75°46′23″E
- Occupations: Freedom activist Social worker
- Children: Three sons and three daughters
- Parent: Chogalalji Patodi
- Awards: Padma Shri

Babulal Patodi (1920–2012) was an Indian social worker and freedom activist. He was a senior member of the Indian National Congress and the president of the Indore Congress Committee from 1949 to 1950 and 1953–54. He also served as M.L.A. The Government of India awarded him the fourth highest civilian award of the Padma Shri, in 1991. He died on 25 January 2012, aged 92. A statue has been installed at top Gomatgiri hills in his honour.

== See also ==
- Indian freedom struggle
