= Prem Prakash Singh =

Indian politician

Prem Prakash Singh (1 October 1952 - 24 February 2023) was an Indian politician from Samajwadi Party.village - paina(Deoria). He was elected as an MLA from Barhaj constituency in 2012. He was also questioned by Chief Electoral Officer since it was found that he was voting at two distinct locations, as per Indian law, you can only register to vote from one place.
