= Devendra Singh Rajput =

Member of the Uttar Pradesh legislative assembly
- Constituency: badaun, Uttar Pradesh

Personal details
- Party: Bharatiya Janata Party
- Occupation: Politician

Devendra Singh Rajput is an Indian politician of the Bharatiya Janata Party. He also holds the position of MLA (Member of the Legislative Assembly) from Kasganj, Uttar Pradesh. He took part in the 2017 elections and won.

== Controversy ==
Previously Rajput was held in the case of assaulting Chokhe Lal who was the owner of the shop which he purchased.

== Political career ==
In 2022 Rajput won the seat of MLA in Kasganj district by 46,265 votes against Man Pal Singh from the Samajwadi Party. In 2017 he also won 101,908 votes against Akhilesh Yadav.
