= Daljeet Singh =

Hong Kong cricketer

Personal information
- Full name: Daljeet Singh
- Born: 10 January 1989 (age 37); Hong Kong
- Batting: Left-handed
- Bowling: Right-arm medium
- Role: Bowler

Career statistics
Competition	T20
Matches	4
Runs scored	7
Batting average	–
100s/50s	0/0
Top score	7*
Balls bowled	48
Wickets	1
Bowling average	60.00
5 wickets in innings	0
10 wickets in match	0
Best bowling	1/20
Catches/stumpings	2/–
- Source: CricInfo, 2 July 2015

Daljeet Singh (born 14 October 1995) is a cricketer who plays for the Hong Kong national cricket team. Daljeet is a right-handed batsman and bowls right-arm medium.

Daljeet made his Twenty20 cricket debut against Nepal national cricket team on 13 March 2012. He played a total of four T20 games.
