= Gorakh Paswan =

Indian politician

Gorakh Paswan is an India politician who was elected as an MLA twice (in 2012 and in 2017) from Belthara Road constituency in Uttar Pradesh. He belongs to the Samajwadi Party. In 2015, he received death threats to leave the politics. His son Sudheer Kumar is also an SP Politician and was elected from Ballia in 2016.
