= Ravindra Kumar Bhadana =

Indian politician

MLA, 16th Legislative Assembly
- In office 2012–2017
- Preceded by: None
- Constituency: Meerut South

Personal details
- Born: 1 July 1963 (age 63) Meerut district, Uttar Pradesh
- Party: Bharatiya Janata Party
- Spouse: Mridu Bhadana (wife)
- Children: 2 sons
- Parent: Bijendra Singh (father)
- Education: Janta Inter College
- Profession: Agriculturist & Politician
- Website: https://ravinderkumar.in

Ravindra Kumar Bhadana is an Indian politician and a member of the 16th Legislative Assembly of Uttar Pradesh of India. He represents the Meerut South constituency of Uttar Pradesh and is a member of the Bharatiya Janata Party political party.

== Early life and education ==
Ravindra Kumar Bhadana was born in Meerut district, Uttar Pradesh. He attended Janta Inter College and is educated till twelfth grade.

== Political career ==
Ravindra Kumar Bhadana has been a MLA for one term. He represented the Meerut South constituency and is a member of the Bharatiya Janata Party political party.

== Posts held ==
#	From	To	Position	Comments
01	2012	Incumbent	Member, 16th Legislative Assembly	

== See also ==
- Meerut South
- Sixteenth Legislative Assembly of Uttar Pradesh
- Uttar Pradesh Legislative Assembly
