= Vinod Tiwari =

Indian politician

Vinod Tiwari was a politician from Uttar Pradesh, India. He was member of the legislative assembly representing Pharenda constituency in Maharajganj District.
