= Babulal Dahiya =

Indian farmer and poet

Babulal Dahiya is a farmer and poet. He was awarded India's fourth highest civilian the Padma Shri.
