= Omprakash =

Omprakash is a given name. Notable people with the name include:

- Omprakash Agarwal (1955–1994), Indian professional snooker player
- Anupbhaiyya Omprakash Agrawal, aka Anup Agrawal, Indian politician
- Omprakash Chautala (1935–2024), Indian politician
- Omprakash Hudla (born 1972), Indian politician
- Omprakash Babarao Kadu, Indian founder of Prahar Janshakti Party
- Omprakash Khatik, Indian politician
- Rakeysh Omprakash Mehra (born 2011), Indian film director, actor and screenwriter
- Omprakash Raje Nimbalkar, Indian politician
- Omprakash Sakhlecha Indian politician
- Omprakash Singh (born 1959), Indian politician
- Omprakash Yadav, Nepalese politician

== See also ==
- Omprakash Zindabaad (Victory to Omprakash), a 2020 Hindi-language film previously titled Rambhajjan Zindabad
