= Hasrat Ullah Sherwani =

Indian politician

Hasratullah Sherwani
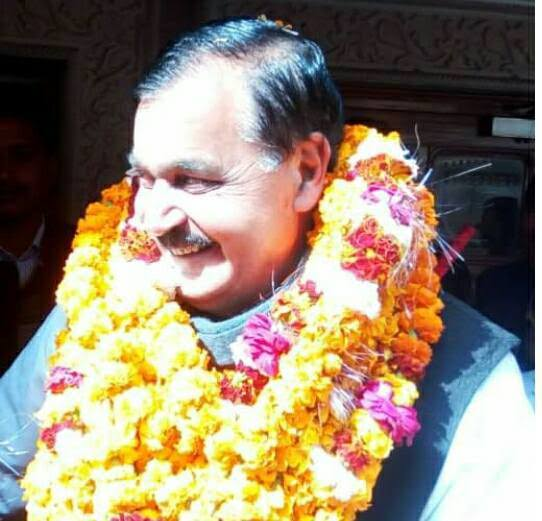

MLA, Legislative Assembly of Uttar Pradesh
- In office March 2007 – March 2012
- Constituency: Kasganj (Assembly constituency)

Personal details
- Born: 1 April 1957 (age 69) Etah district, Uttar Pradesh, India
- Party: Samajwadi Party
- Spouse: Rehana Khan
- Children: 1
- Profession: Farmer, entrepreneur, politician

Hasratullah Sherwani (born 1 April 1957) is an Indian politician and a member of the Fifteenth Legislative Assembly of Uttar Pradesh in India. He represented the Kasganj constituency of Uttar Pradesh election in 2007 till 2012.

== Formation of Kasganj District ==
On 17 April 2008, under the leadership of Hasrat as the MLA from Kasganj, it was demanded to make Kasganj a separate district. Today, Kasganj is the 71st district of Uttar Pradesh.

== Public life ==
Sherwani was part of the peace meeting to deflate the public unrest of Kasganj on 26 January 2018.
