= Bhojpur, Uttar Pradesh Assembly constituency =

Constituency of the Uttar Pradesh legislative assembly in India

Coordinates: 28.79°N 77.63°E

Bhojpur
- Constituency No. 195 for the Uttar Pradesh Legislative Assembly

Constituency details
- Country: India
- Region: North India
- State: Uttar Pradesh
- District: Farrukhabad
- Total electors: 3,19,917
- Reservation: None

Member of Legislative Assembly
- 18th Uttar Pradesh Legislative Assembly
- Incumbent Nagendra Singh Rathore
- Party: Bharatiya Janta Party
- Elected year: 2022

Bhojpur is a constituency of the Uttar Pradesh Legislative Assembly covering the city of Bhojpur in the Farrukhabad district of Uttar Pradesh, India.

Bhojpur is one of five assembly constituencies in the Farrukhabad Lok Sabha constituency. Since 2008, this assembly constituency is numbered 195 amongst 403 constituencies.

== Members of the Legislative Assembly ==
Election	Name	Party
2012	Jamaluddin Siddiqui	Samajwadi Party
2017	Nagendra Singh Rathore	Bharatiya Janata Party
2022	Nagendra Singh Rathore	Bharatiya Janata Party

== Election results ==
=== 2027 ===
2027 Uttar Pradesh Legislative Assembly election: Bhojpur
Party	Candidate	Votes	%	±%
INDIA				
NDA				
BSP				
NOTA	None of the above			
Majority				
Turnout				
gain from		Swing		

=== 2022 ===
2022 Uttar Pradesh Legislative Assembly election: Bhojpur
Party	Candidate	Votes	%	±%
BJP	Nagendra Singh Rathore	99,979	50.68	+0.78
SP	Arshad Siddiqui	72,521	36.76	+5.44
BSP	Alok Verma	15,714	7.97	−5.79
AIMIM	Talib Siddiqui	3,919	1.99	
INC	Archana Rathaur	2,053	1.04	
NOTA	None of the above	947	0.48	+0.32
Majority		27,458	13.92	−4.66
Turnout		197,269	61.66	+0.55
BJP hold		Swing		

2017 Uttar Pradesh Legislative Assembly Election: Bhojpur
Party	Candidate	Votes	%	±%
BJP	Nagendra Singh Rathore	93,673	49.9	
SP	Arshad Siddiqui	58,796	31.32	
BSP	Nitin Singh Rajput	25,838	13.76	
LKD	Urmila	2,116	1.13	
NOTA	None of the above	299	0.16	
Majority		34,877	18.58	
Turnout		187,708	61.11	
