= Padrauna Assembly constituency =

Constituency of the Uttar Pradesh legislative assembly in India

Coordinates: 26.90°N 83.98°E

Padrauna
- Constituency No. 330 for the Uttar Pradesh Legislative Assembly

Constituency details
- Country: India
- Region: North India
- State: Uttar Pradesh
- District: Kushinagar
- Reservation: None

Member of Legislative Assembly
- 18th Uttar Pradesh Legislative Assembly
- Incumbent Manish Jaiswal
- Party: Bhartiya Janta Party
- Elected year: 2022

Padrauna is a constituency of the Uttar Pradesh Legislative Assembly covering the city of Padrauna in the Kushinagar district of Uttar Pradesh, India.

Padrauna is one of five assembly constituencies in the Kushi Nagar Lok Sabha constituency. Since 2008, this assembly constituency is numbered 330 amongst 403 constituencies.

== Members of Legislative Assembly ==
Year	Member	Party
1967	Chandradeo	Indian National Congress
1969	Chandra Pratap Narain Singh	Bharatiya Kranti Dal
1974	Purushottam Kaushik	Bharatiya Kranti Dal
1977	Purushottam Kaushik	Janata Party
1980	Brij Kishore	Indian National Congress (I)
1985	Baleshwar Yadav	Lokdal
1989	Asgar	Communist Party of India
1991	Surendra Shukla	Bharatiya Janata Party
1993	Baleshwar Yadav	Samajwadi Party
1996	Ratanjit Pratap Narain Singh	Indian National Congress
2002	Ratanjit Pratap Narain Singh	Indian National Congress
2007	Ratanjit Pratap Narain Singh	Indian National Congress
2009^	Swami Prasad Maurya	Bahujan Samaj Party
2012	Swami Prasad Maurya	Bahujan Samaj Party
2017	Swami Prasad Maurya	Bharatiya Janata Party
2022	Manish Kumar Jaiswal	Bharatiya Janata Party

== Election results ==
=== 2027 ===
2027 Uttar Pradesh Legislative Assembly election: Padrauna
Party	Candidate	Votes	%	±%
BJP				
INDIA				
BSP				
AIMIM				
Majority				
Turnout				
gain from		Swing		

=== 2022 ===
2022 Uttar Pradesh Legislative Assembly election: Padrauna
Party	Candidate	Votes	%	±%
BJP	Manish Kumar Jaiswal	114,496	49.8	+5.36
SP	Vikrama Yadav	72,488	31.53	
BSP	Nisar Ahmed	20,983	9.13	−16.07
AIMIM	Javed Yunus Khan	7,976	3.47	
INC	Mohammad Jahiruddin	3,338	1.45	−18.08
Independent	Anshuman Banka	3,026	1.32	
NOTA	None of the above	1,394	0.61	−0.18
Majority		42,008	18.27	−0.97
Turnout		229,907	60.1	−0.3
BJP hold		Swing		

=== 2017 ===
Bharatiya Janta Party candidate Swami Prasad Maurya won in last Assembly election of 2017 Uttar Pradesh Legislative Elections defeating Bahujan Samaj Party candidate Javed Iqbal by a margin of 40,552 votes.

2017 Uttar Pradesh Legislative Assembly Election: Padraun
Party	Candidate	Votes	%	±%
BJP	Swami Prasad Maurya	93,649	44.44	
BSP	Javed Iqbal	53,097	25.2	
INC	Shivkumari Devi	41,162	19.53	
PECP	Rajendra Alias Munna Yadav	8,329	3.95	
Independent	Rajesh Prasad Saini	2,196	1.04	
NOTA	None of the above	1,658	0.79	
Majority		40,552	19.24	
Turnout		210,742	60.4	

== See also ==
- Padrauna
- Kushinagar district
- Kushi Nagar Lok Sabha constituency
