= 2017 Uttar Pradesh Legislative Assembly election =

- 11 February – 8 March 2017

All 403 seats of the Uttar Pradesh Legislative Assembly 202 seats needed for a majority
- Turnout: 61.24% (▲1.84%)
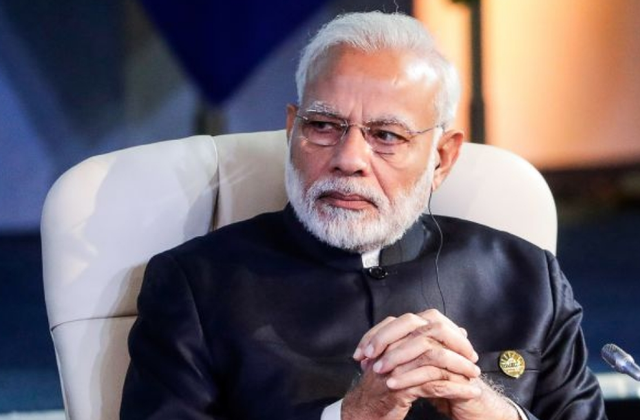

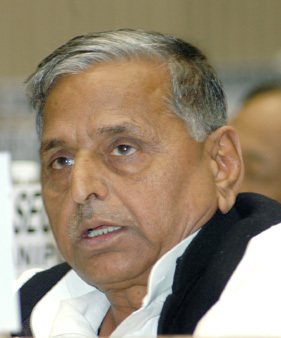

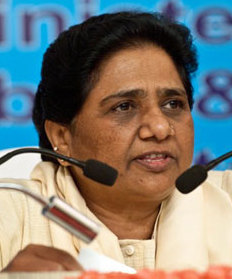
	Majority party	Minority party	Third party
Leader	Narendra Modi	Mulayam Singh Yadav	Mayawati
Party	BJP	SP	BSP
Alliance	NDA	JP	-
Leader since	2014	2012	1995
Leader's seat	Did not contest	MLC	Rajya Sabha
Last election	15.00%, 47 seats	29.15%, 224 seats	25.91%, 80 seats
Seats won	312	47	19
Seat change	▲265	▼177	▼61
Popular vote	34,403,299	18,923,769	19,281,340
Percentage	39.67%	21.82%	22.23%
Swing	▲24.67%	▼7.33%	▼3.68%
Alliance seats	325	54	19
Seat change	▲278	▼198	▼61
- Seatwise Result Map of the election

- Alliance wise Structure of Uttar Pradesh Legislative Assembly
Chief Minister before election
Akhilesh Yadav
Samajwadi Party (In coalition with RJD, INC,, RLD)
Elected Chief Minister
Yogi Adityanath
Bharatiya Janata Party (In coalition with AD(S), SBSP)

The election to the 17th Uttar Pradesh Legislative Assembly was held from 11 February to 8 March 2017 in 7 phases. This election saw a voter turnout of 61.11% compared to 59.40% in the previous election. The Bharatiya Janata Party (BJP) won the election by an overwhelming three-quarters majority of 325 seats despite not projecting a chief ministerial candidate before the election. As part of its election strategy, BJP contested under a collective leadership and capitalised mostly on the political clout and 'brand' of its leader Narendra Modi.

On 18 March 2017, Yogi Adityanath was appointed as the Chief Minister of Uttar Pradesh. Then Uttar Pradesh BJP chief Keshav Prasad Maurya and Dinesh Sharma were appointed as Deputy Chief Ministers.

== Background ==
=== Electoral process changes ===
In January 2016, the Election Commission of India published updated electoral rolls in all 403 assembly segments. In July 2016, Election Commission decided to increase the number of polling booths in Uttar Pradesh for the 2017 Assembly elections. New polling centres will be planned in the constituencies having more than 1,500 registered voters as well as polling booths in six constituencies of Muzaffarnagar, Budhana, Purkazi, Khatoli, Charthawal and Midanpur to be raised from 1,769 to 1,819 booths. Voter assistance booths would be set up and photo slip of voters in a new design would be sent to them. First time, the Form-2B would contain the photograph of the candidates and their nationality.

Voter-verified paper audit trail (VVPAT) machines was used along with EVM in 30 assembly constituencies covering 14 districts including Varanasi, Ghaziabad and Bareilly constituency.

Assembly constituencies of Uttar Pradesh having VVPAT facility with EVMs
Lucknow West	Lucknow North	Lucknow East	Agra Cantonment
Agra South	Aligarh	Bareilly	Govind Nagar
Arya Nagar	Ghaziabad	Meerut	Moradabad
Saharanpur Nagar	Allahabad North	Allahabad South	Ayodhya
Gorakhpur Urban	Jhansi Nagar	Varanasi North	Varanasi Cantt.

As per the special summary revision of electoral rolls, there are a total of 14.05 crore voters in Uttar Pradesh as of January 2015.

Final voters list for Uttar Pradesh Legislative Assembly election 2017
S.No	Group of voters	Voters population
1	Male	7.7 crore (70.7 Million)
2	Female	6.3 crore (60.3 Million)
3	Third Gender	6,983 (Six thousand nine hundred and eighty three)
Total Voters		14.05 crore

== Schedule ==
Assembly elections in Uttar Pradesh were held between 11 February and 8 March 2017. The term of the outgoing government ended on 27 May 2017.

On 4 January 2017, The Election Commission of India announced the election schedule to the Legislative Assembly of Uttar Pradesh along with the other four state (Goa, Manipur, Punjab and Uttarakhand) which are due for an election. The entire election is scheduled into 7 phases.

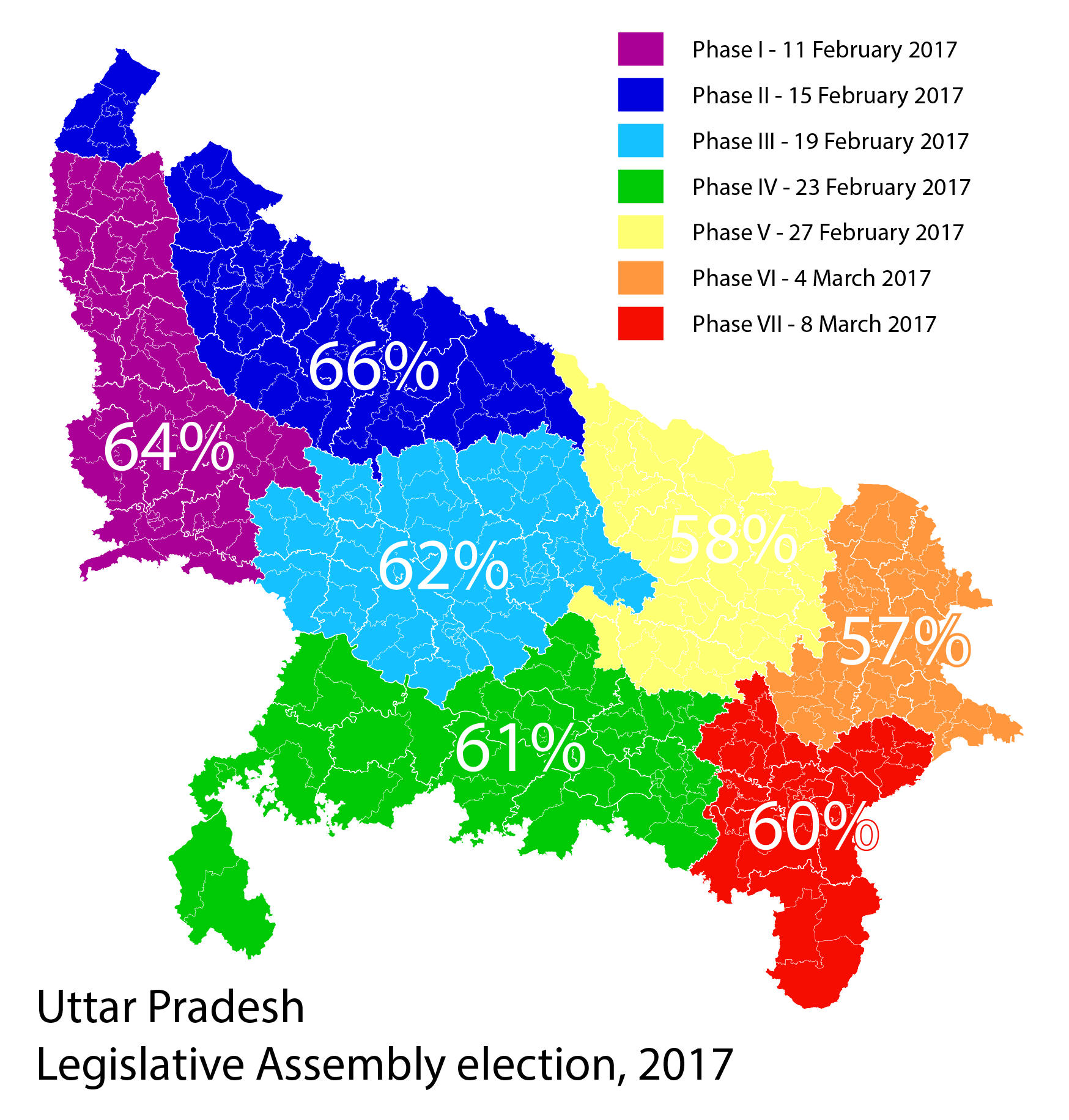
Election schedule with voter turnout percentage in each phase

Poll event	Phase						
Poll event	I	II	III	IV	V	VI	VII
Notification date	17 January 2017	20 January 2017	24 January 2017	30 January 2017	2 February 2017	8 February 2017	11 February 2017
Last date for filing nomination	24 January 2017	27 January 2017	31 January 2017	6 February 2017	9 February 2017	15 February 2017	18 February 2017
Scrutiny of nomination	25 January 2017	28 January 2017	2 February 2017	7 February 2017	11 February 2017	16 February 2017	20 February 2017
Last date for withdrawal of nomination	27 January 2017	30 January 2017	4 February 2017	9 February 2017	13 February 2017	18 February 2017	22 February 2017
Date of poll	11 February 2017	15 February 2017	19 February 2017	23 February 2017	27 February 2017	4 March 2017	8 March 2017
Date of counting of votes	11 March 2017						

Phase
I (73 ACs, 15 Districts)	II (67 ACs, 11 Districts)	III (69 ACs, 12 Districts)	IV (53 ACs, 12 Districts)	V (52 ACs, 11 Districts)	VI (49 ACs, 7 Districts)	VII (40 ACs, 7 Districts)
Shamli; Muzaffarnagar; Meerut; Baghpat; Ghaziabad; Hapur; Gautam Budh Nagar; Bulandshahr; Aligarh; Mathura; Agra; Hathras; Firozabad; Kasganj; Etah	Saharanpur; Bijnor; Moradabad; Sambhal; Rampur; Amroha; Budaun; Bareilly; Shahjahanpur; Pilibhit; Lakhimpur Kheri	Mainpuri; Farrukhabad; Hardoi; Kannauj; Etawah; Auraiya; Kanpur Dehat; Kanpur Nagar; Sitapur; Unnao; Lucknow; Barabanki	Jalaun; Jhansi; Lalitpur; Hamirpur; Mahoba; Rae Bareli; Banda; Fatehpur; Chitrakoot; Pratapgarh; Kaushambi; Prayagraj	Amethi; Sultanpur; Ambedkar Nagar; Balrampur; Siddharthnagar; Ayodhya; Bahraich; Shravasti; Gonda; Basti; Sant Kabir Nagar	Maharajganj; Gorakhpur; Kushinagar; Deoria; Ballia; Azamgarh; Mau	Ghazipur; Jaunpur; Chandauli; Varanasi; Bhadohi; Mirzapur; Sonbhadra

== Predictions ==
=== Opinion polls ===
Various organisations/agencies have been conducting opinions polls to predict voter intentions in the upcoming legislative assembly elections.

Date	Ref	Polling org./agency				
Date	Ref	Polling org./agency	BSP	BJP	SP + INC	Others
March 2016		ABP News Opinion Poll	185	120	93	5
March 2016		ABP News Opinion Poll	31%	24%	34%	5%
Jul–Aug 2016		ABP News-Lokniti	103-113 (108)	124-134 (129)	149-165 (157)	6-12 (9)
Jul–Aug 2016		ABP News-Lokniti	26%	27%	35%	11%
Aug 2016		India TV-CVoter	95-111 (103)	134-150 (142)	138-162 (150)	4-12 (8)
Aug 2016		India TV-CVoter	25.4%	27.79%	33.7%	
Oct 2016		India Today-Axis	115-124 (118)	170-183 (175)	102-115 (107)	2-6 (3)
Oct 2016		India Today-Axis	28%	31%	31%	
Dec 2016		ABP News-Lokniti-CSDS	93-103 (98)	129-139 (134)	154-170 (162)	9
Jan 2017		India Today-Axis	39-43	180-191	168-178	1-4
Jan 2017		India Today-Axis	20.1%	34.8%	33.2%	
Jan 2017		The WEEK-Hansa Research	20-24 (22)	192-196 (194)	178-182 (180)	5-9 (7)
27 January 2017		TNSPIMT	23	177	201	
29 January 2017		News 24 (India)	76	120	(191)	
30 January 2017		ABP News-Lokniti-CSDS	76-86 (81)	118-128 (123)	187-197 (192)	
30 January 2017		ABP News-Lokniti-CSDS	23%	29%	35%	
30 January 2017		Times Now-VMR	47	202	147	7
Polls average			89	157	153	4

=== Exit polls ===
Various organisations/agencies have been conducting Exit polls to predict voter intentions in the legislative assembly elections. Hindi newspaper Dainik Jagran had published an exit poll promoting BJP, after first phase of the election. This led to its editor being arrested for violating the ban on exit polls during the election.

Polling org./agency					Date	Ref
Polling org./agency	BSP	BJP	SP + INC	Others	Date	Ref
VMR	64	200	120	19	9-March 2017	
Dainik Bharat	36	309	47	11	9-March 2017	
MRC	90	185	120	8	9-March 2017	
Today's Chanakya	27	285	88	3	9-March 2017	
AXIS	28-42	251-279	88-112	6-16	9-March 2017	
CVoter	87	161	141	14	9-March 2017	
Gramener	67	193	133	10	9-March 2017	
India TV Forecast	81 - 93	155 - 167	135-147	0	9-March 2017	
ABP News-CSDS	60-72	164-176	156-169	02-06	9-March 2017	
TNSPIMT	47	176	178	02	9-March 2017	
Polls average	67	228	144	8		

== Voter Turnout ==
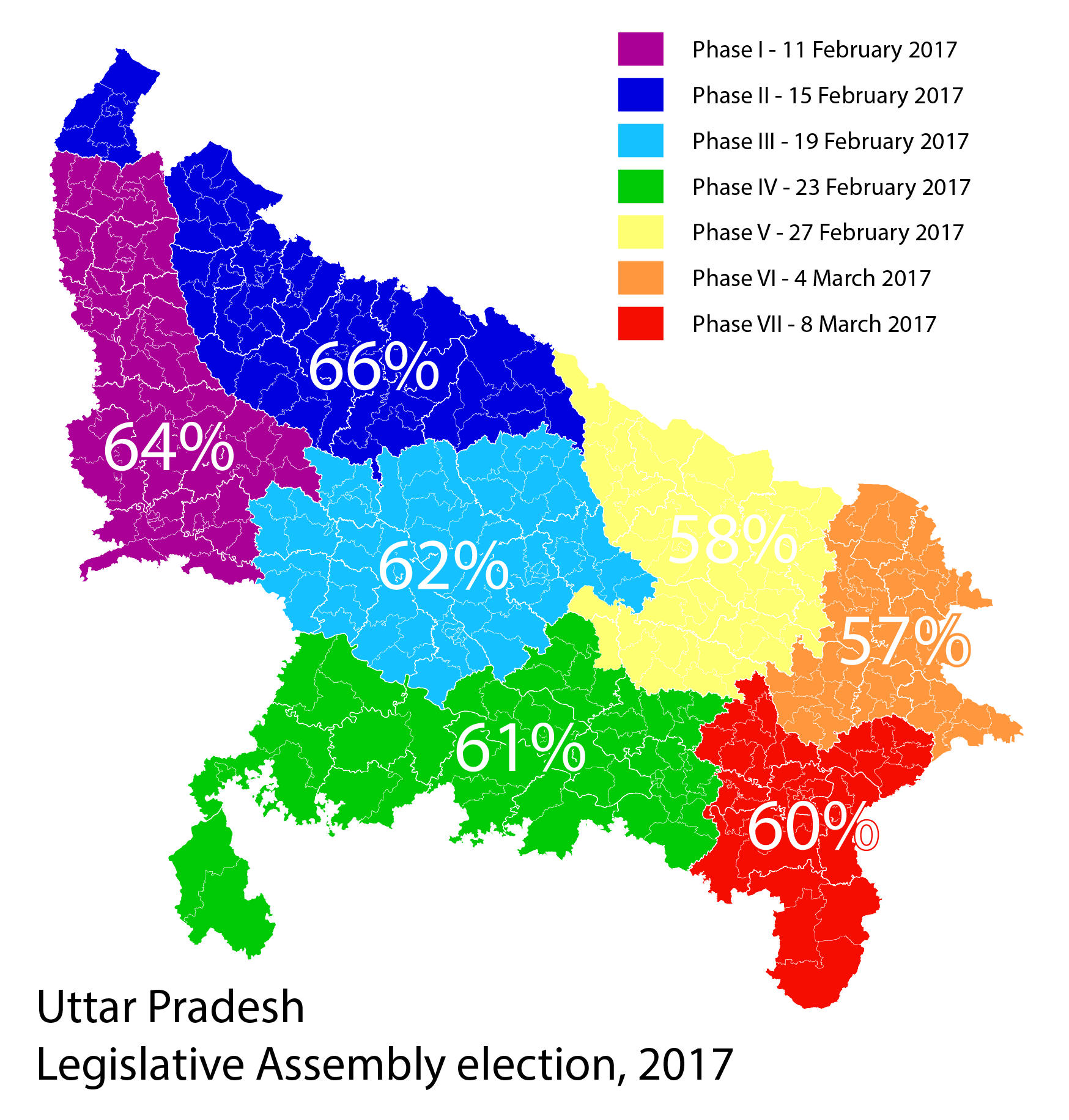
Election schedule with voter turnout percentage in each phase

Phase	Date	Total Seats	Districts	Seats	Phase Turnout (%)
I	11 February 2017	73	Shamli	3	64%
I	11 February 2017	73	Muzaffarnagar	6	64%
I	11 February 2017	73	Baghpat	3	64%
I	11 February 2017	73	Meerut	7	64%
I	11 February 2017	73	Ghaziabad	5	64%
I	11 February 2017	73	Gautam Buddha Nagar	3	64%
I	11 February 2017	73	Hapur	3	64%
I	11 February 2017	73	Bulandshahar	7	64%
I	11 February 2017	73	Aligarh	7	64%
I	11 February 2017	73	Mathura	5	64%
I	11 February 2017	73	Hathras	3	64%
I	11 February 2017	73	Agra	9	64%
I	11 February 2017	73	Firozabad	5	64%
I	11 February 2017	73	Etah	4	64%
I	11 February 2017	73	Kasganj	3	64%
II	15 February 2022	67	Saharanpur	7	66%
II	15 February 2022	67	Bijnor	8	66%
II	15 February 2022	67	Moradabad	6	66%
II	15 February 2022	67	Sambhal	4	66%
II	15 February 2022	67	Rampur	5	66%
II	15 February 2022	67	Bareilly	9	66%
II	15 February 2022	67	Amroha	4	66%
II	15 February 2022	67	Pilibhit	4	66%
II	15 February 2022	67	Kheri	8	66%
II	15 February 2022	67	Shahjahanpur	6	66%
II	15 February 2022	67	Badaun	6	66%
III	19 February 2022	69	Farrukhabad	4	62%
III	19 February 2022	69	Hardoi	8	62%
III	19 February 2022	69	Kannauj	3	62%
III	19 February 2022	69	Mainpuri	4	62%
III	19 February 2022	69	Etawah	3	62%
III	19 February 2022	69	Auraiya	3	62%
III	19 February 2022	69	Kanpur Dehat	4	62%
III	19 February 2022	69	Kanpur Nagar	10	62%
III	19 February 2022	69	Unnao	6	62%
III	19 February 2022	69	Lucknow	9	62%
III	19 February 2022	69	Barabanki	6	62%
III	19 February 2022	69	Sitapur	9	62%
IV	23 February 2022	53	Pratapgarh	7	61%
IV	23 February 2022	53	Kaushambi	3	61%
IV	23 February 2022	53	Prayagraj	11	61%
IV	23 February 2022	53	Jalaun	3	61%
IV	23 February 2022	53	Jhansi	4	61%
IV	23 February 2022	53	Lalitpur	2	61%
IV	23 February 2022	53	Mahoba	2	61%
IV	23 February 2022	53	Hamirpur	2	61%
IV	23 February 2022	53	Banda	4	61%
IV	23 February 2022	53	Chitrakoot	2	61%
IV	23 February 2022	53	Fatehpur	6	61%
IV	23 February 2022	53	Rae Bareli	6	61%
V	27 February 2022	52	Balrampur	4	58%
V	27 February 2022	52	Gonda	7	58%
V	27 February 2022	52	Ayodhya	5	58%
V	27 February 2022	52	Ambedkar Nagar	5	58%
V	27 February 2022	52	Bahraich	7	58%
V	27 February 2022	52	Shrawasti	2	58%
V	27 February 2022	52	Siddharthnagar	5	58%
V	27 February 2022	52	Basti	5	58%
V	27 February 2022	52	Sant Kabir Nagar	3	58%
V	27 February 2022	52	Amethi	4	58%
V	27 February 2022	52	Sultanpur	5	58%
VI	4 March 2022	49	Maharajganj	5	57%
VI	4 March 2022	49	Kushi Nagar	7	57%
VI	4 March 2022	49	Gorakhpur	9	57%
VI	4 March 2022	49	Deoria	7	57%
VI	4 March 2022	49	Azamgarh	10	57%
VI	4 March 2022	49	Mau	4	57%
VI	4 March 2022	49	Ballia	7	57%
VII	8 March 2022	40	Ghazipur	7	60%
VII	8 March 2022	40	Varanasi	8	60%
VII	8 March 2022	40	Chandauli	5	60%
VII	8 March 2022	40	Mirzapur	4	60%
VII	8 March 2022	40	Bhadohi	3	60%
VII	8 March 2022	40	Sonbhadra	4	60%
VII	8 March 2022	40	Jaunpur	9	60%

== Result ==
The election results for all 403 Legislative Assembly seats were declared on 11 March 2017.

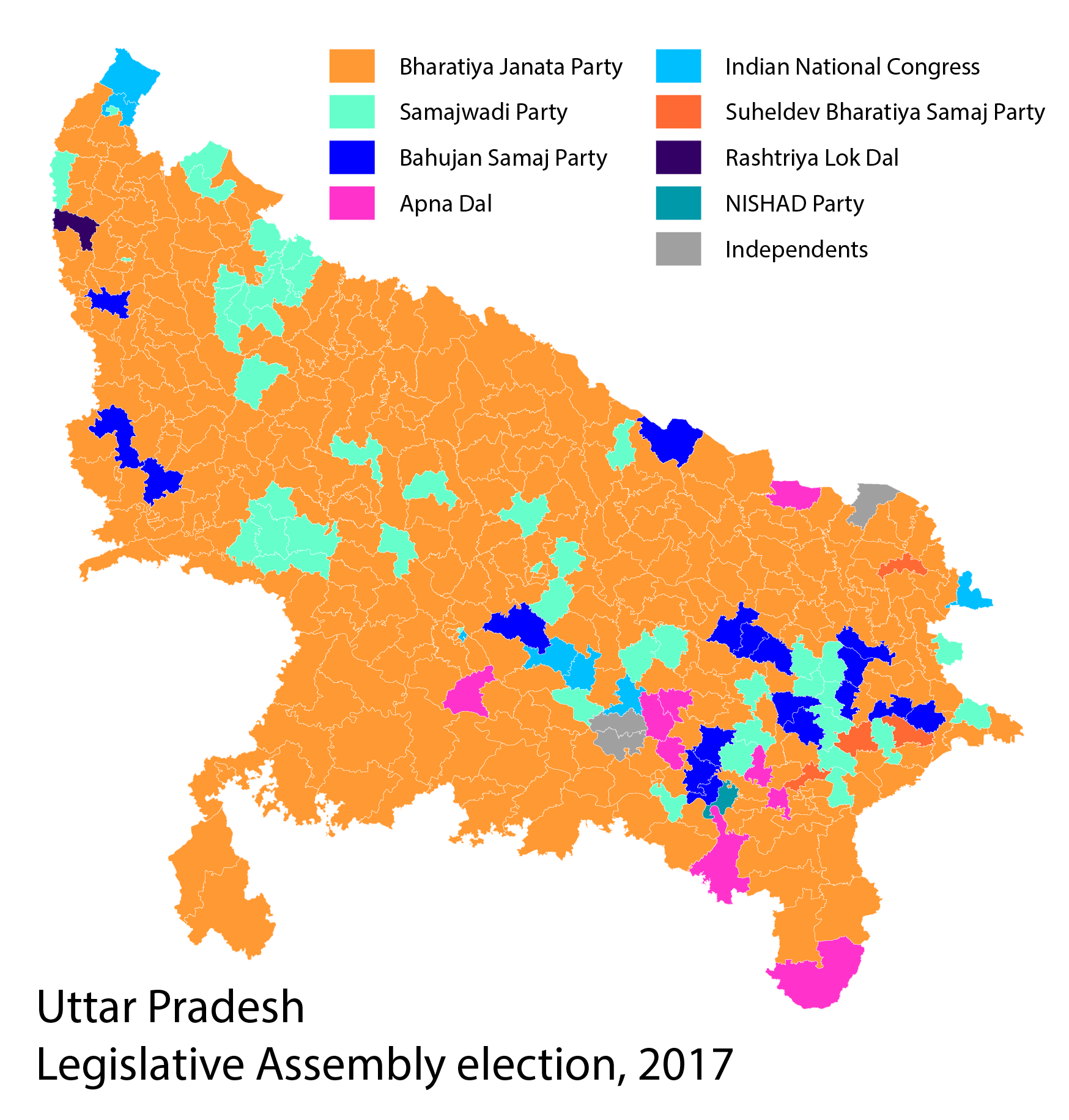

← Summary of 11 February – 8 March 2017 Uttar Pradesh Legislative Assembly election results
Party	Popular vote			Candidates		
Party	Votes	%	±pp	Contested	Won	+/−
Bharatiya Janata Party (BJP)	3,44,03,299	39.67%	▲24.7%	384	312	▲265
Bahujan Samaj Party (BSP)	1,92,81,340	22.23%	▼3.7%	403	19	▼61
Samajwadi Party (SP)	1,89,23,769	21.82%	▼7.7%	311	47	▼177
Indian National Congress (INC)	54,16,540	6.25%	▼5.4%	114	7	▼21
Independents (IND)	22,29,453	2.57%	▼1.5%	1462	3	▼11
Rashtriya Lok Dal (RLD)	15,45,811	1.78%	▼0.55%	277	1	▼8
Apna Dal (Soneylal) AD(S)	8,51,336	0.98%	▲0.98%	11	9	▲9
Suheldev Bharatiya Samaj Party (SBSP)	6,07,911	0.70%	▲0.07%	8	4	▲4
Nirbal Indian Shoshit Hamara Aam Dal (NISHAD)	5,40,539	0.62%	▲0.6%	72	1	▲1
Peace Party of India (PECP)	2,27,998	0.26%	▼2.0%	68	0	▼4
All India Majlis-e-Ittehadul Muslimeen (AIMIM)	2,04,142	0.24%	Steady	38	0	Steady
Lokdal (LD)	1,81,704	0.21%	▲0.1%	81	0	Steady
Bahujan Mukti Party (BMUP)	1,52,838	0.18%	▲0.2%	182	0	Steady
Communist Party of India (CPI)	1,38,764	0.16%	Steady	68	0	Steady
Mahan Dal (MD)	96,087	0.11%	▼0.8%	14	0	Steady
Shiv Sena (SS)	88,595	0.10%	▲0.07%	57	0	Steady
Other parties	1,080,555	1.25%	▼7.3%	1,643	0	▼3
None of the above (NOTA)	7,57,643	0.87%	▲0.9%	—N/a		
Total	86,728,324	100.00			403	±0
Valid votes	8,67,28,324	99.97				
Invalid votes	27,175	0.03				
Votes cast / turnout	8,67,55,499	61.24				
Abstentions	5,49,08,147	38.76				
Registered voters	14,16,63,646					

=== Region-wise ===
Region	Seats	BJP		SP		BSP		AD-S		INC	
Purvanchal	102	69	▲57	13	▼44	8	▼8	5	▲5	1	▼7
Bundelkhand	19	19	▲16	0	▼5	0	▼7	0	Steady	0	▼4
Central	64	45	▲39	8	▼34	2	▼7	4	▲4	2	▼1
Avadh	90	75	▲69	9	▼61	6	▼3	0	Steady	0	▼5
Ruhelkhand	52	38	▲30	14	▼15	0	▼11	0	Steady	0	▼2
Western	76	66	▲54	4	▼17	3	▼25	0	Steady	2	▼4
Total Seats	403	312	▲265	47	▼177	19	▼61	9	▲9	7	▼21

=== Results by district ===
Division	Seats				
Division	Seats	NDA	UPA	BSP	OTH
Saharanpur Division
Saharanpur	7	4	3	—N/a	—N/a
Shamli	3	2	1	—N/a	—N/a
Muzaffarnagar	6	6	—N/a	—N/a	—N/a
Moradabad Division
Bijnor	8	6	2	—N/a	—N/a
Moradabad	6	2	4	—N/a	—N/a
Sambhal	4	2	2	—N/a	—N/a
Rampur	5	2	3	—N/a	—N/a
Amroha	4	3	1	—N/a	—N/a
Meerut Division
Meerut	7	6	1	—N/a	—N/a
Baghpat	3	2	—N/a	—N/a	1
Ghaziabad	5	5	—N/a	—N/a	—N/a
Hapur	3	2	—N/a	1	—N/a
G. B. Nagar	3	3	—N/a	—N/a	—N/a
Bulandshahr	7	7	—N/a	—N/a	—N/a
Aligarh Division
Aligarh	7	7	—N/a	—N/a	—N/a
Kasganj	3	3	—N/a	—N/a	—N/a
Etah	4	4	—N/a	—N/a	—N/a
Hathras	3	2	—N/a	1	—N/a
Agra Division
Mathura	5	4	—N/a	1	—N/a
Agra	9	9	—N/a	—N/a	—N/a
Firozabad	5	4	1	—N/a	—N/a
Mainpuri	4	1	3	—N/a	—N/a
Bareilly Division
Budaun	6	5	1	—N/a	—N/a
Bareilly	9	9	—N/a	—N/a	—N/a
Pilibhit	4	4	—N/a	—N/a	—N/a
Shahjahanpur	6	5	1	—N/a	—N/a
Lucknow Division
Lakhimpur Kheri	8	8	—N/a	—N/a	—N/a
Sitapur	9	7	1	1	—N/a
Hardoi	8	7	1	—N/a	—N/a
Unnao	6	5	—N/a	1	—N/a
Lucknow	9	8	1	—N/a	—N/a
Raebareli	6	3	3	—N/a	—N/a
Ayodhya Division
Amethi	4	3	1	—N/a	—N/a
Sultanpur	5	4	1	—N/a	—N/a
Barabanki	6	5	1	—N/a	—N/a
Ayodhya	5	5	—N/a	—N/a	—N/a
Ambedkar Nagar	5	2	—N/a	3	—N/a
Kanpur Division
Farrukhabad	4	4	—N/a	—N/a	—N/a
Kannauj	3	2	1	—N/a	—N/a
Etawah	3	2	1	—N/a	—N/a
Auraiya	3	3	—N/a	—N/a	—N/a
Kanpur Dehat	4	4	—N/a	—N/a	—N/a
Kanpur Nagar	10	7	3	—N/a	—N/a
Jhansi Division
Jalaun	3	3	—N/a	—N/a	—N/a
Jhansi	4	4	—N/a	—N/a	—N/a
Lalitpur	2	2	—N/a	—N/a	—N/a
Chitrakoot Division
Hamirpur	2	2	—N/a	—N/a	—N/a
Mahoba	2	2	—N/a	—N/a	—N/a
Banda	4	4	—N/a	—N/a	—N/a
Chitrakoot	2	2	—N/a	—N/a	—N/a
Prayagraj Division
Fatehpur	6	6	—N/a	—N/a	—N/a
Pratapgarh	7	4	1	—N/a	2
Kaushambi	3	3	—N/a	—N/a	—N/a
Prayagraj	12	9	1	2	—N/a
Devipatan Division
Bahraich	7	6	1	—N/a	—N/a
Shrawasti	2	1	—N/a	1	—N/a
Balrampur	4	4	—N/a	—N/a	—N/a
Gonda	7	7	—N/a	—N/a	—N/a
Basti Division
Siddharthnagar	5	5	—N/a	—N/a	—N/a
Basti	5	5	—N/a	—N/a	—N/a
Sant Kabir Nagar	3	3	—N/a	—N/a	—N/a
Gorakhpur Division
Maharajganj	5	4	—N/a	—N/a	1
Gorakhpur	9	8	—N/a	1	—N/a
Kushinagar	7	6	1	—N/a	—N/a
Deoria	7	6	1	—N/a	—N/a
Azamgarh Division
Azamgarh	10	1	5	4	—N/a
Mau	4	3	—N/a	1	—N/a
Ballia	7	5	1	1	—N/a
Varanasi Division
Jaunpur	9	5	3	1	—N/a
Ghazipur	7	5	2	—N/a	—N/a
Chandauli	4	3	1	—N/a	—N/a
Varanasi	8	8	—N/a	—N/a	—N/a
Mirzapur Division
Bhadohi	3	2	—N/a	—N/a	1
Mirzapur	5	5	—N/a	—N/a	—N/a
Sonbhadra	4	4	—N/a	—N/a	—N/a
Total	403	325	54	19	5

=== Results by constituency ===
Results
S. No.	Constituency	Winner			Runner-up			Margin
S. No.	Constituency	Candidate	Party	Votes	Candidate	Party	Votes	Margin
Saharanpur District
1	Behat	Naresh Saini	INC	97035	Mahaveer Singh Rana	BJP	71449	25586
2	Nakur	Dharam Singh Saini	BJP	94375	Imran Masood	INC	90318	4057
3	Saharanpur Nagar	Sanjay Garg	SP	127210	Rajiv Gumber	BJP	122574	4636
4	Saharanpur	Masood Akhtar	INC	87689	Jagpal Singh	BSP	75365	12324
5	Deoband	Brijesh Singh	BJP	102244	Majid Ali	BSP	72844	29400
6	Rampur Maniharan (SC)	Devendra Kumar Nim	BJP	76465	Ravinder Kumar Molhu	BSP	75870	595
7	Gangoh	Pradeep Kumar	BJP	99446	Nauman Masood	INC	61418	38028
Shamli District
8	Kairana	Nahid Hasan	SP	98830	Mriganka Singh	BJP	77668	21162
9	Thana Bhawan	Suresh Rana	BJP	90995	Abdul Warish Khan	BSP	74178	16817
10	Shamli	Tejendra Nirwal	BJP	70085	Pankaj Kumar Malik	INC	40365	29720
Muzaffarnagar District
11	Budhana	Umesh Malik	BJP	97781	Pramod Tyagi	SP	84580	13201
12	Charthawal	Vijay Kumar Kashyap	BJP	82046	Mukesh Kumar Chaudhary	SP	58815	23231
13	Purqazi (SC)	Pramod Utwal	BJP	77491	Deepak Kumar	INC	66238	11253
14	Muzaffarnagar	Kapil Dev Aggarwal	BJP	97838	Gaurav Swarup Bansal	SP	87134	10704
15	Khatauli	Vikram Singh Saini	BJP	94771	Chandan Chauhan	SP	63397	31374
16	Meerapur	Avtar Singh Bhadana	BJP	69035	Liyakat Ali	SP	68842	193
Bijnor District
17	Najibabad	Tasleem	SP	81082	Rajiv Kumar Agarwal	BJP	79080	2002
18	Nagina (SC)	Manoj Kumar Paras	SP	77145	Omvati Devi	BJP	69178	7967
19	Barhapur	Kunwar Sushant Singh	BJP	78744	Husain Ahmad	INC	68920	9824
20	Dhampur	Ashok Kumar Rana	BJP	82169	Thakur Mool Chand Chauhan	SP	64305	17864
21	Nehtaur (SC)	Om Kumar	BJP	76644	Munnalal Premi	INC	53493	23151
22	Bijnor	Suchi	BJP	105548	Ruchi Veera	SP	78267	27281
23	Chandpur	Kamlesh Saini	BJP	92345	Mohammad Iqbal	BSP	56696	35649
24	Noorpur	Lokendra Singh	BJP	79172	Naim Ul Hasan	SP	66436	12736
Moradabad District
25	Kanth	Rajesh Kumar Singh	BJP	76307	Anees Ur Rehman	SP	73959	2348
26	Thakurdwara	Nawab Jan	SP	107865	Rajpal Singh Chauhan	BJP	94456	13409
27	Moradabad Rural	Haji Ikram Qureshi	SP	97916	Hari Om Sharma	BJP	69135	28781
28	Moradabad Nagar	Ritesh Kumar Gupta	BJP	123467	Mohammad Yusuf Ansari	SP	120274	3193
29	Kundarki	Mohammad Rizwan	SP	110561	Ramveer Singh	BJP	99740	10821
30	Bilari	Mohd. Faheem	SP	85682	Suresh Saini	BJP	72241	13441
Sambhal District
31	Chandausi (SC)	Gulab Devi	BJP	104806	Vimesh Kumari	INC	59337	45469
32	Asmoli	Pinki Singh Yadav	SP	97610	Narendra Singh	BJP	76484	21126
33	Sambhal	Iqbal Mehmood	SP	79248	Ziaurrehman Barq	AIMIM	60426	18822
Rampur District
34	Suar	Abdullah Azam Khan	SP	106443	Laxmi Saini	BJP	53347	53096
35	Chamraua	Naseer Ahmed Khan	SP	87400	Ali Yusuf Ali	BSP	53024	34376
36	Bilaspur	Baldev Singh Aulakh	BJP	99100	Sanjay Kapoor	INC	76741	22359
37	Rampur	Mohammad Azam Khan	SP	102100	Shiv Bahadur Saxena	BJP	55258	46842
38	Milak (SC)	Rajbala	BJP	89861	Vijay Singh	SP	73194	16667
Amroha District
39	Dhanaura (SC)	Rajeev Tarara	BJP	102943	Jagram Singh	SP	64714	38229
40	Naugawan Sadat	Chetan Chauhan	BJP	97030	Javed Abbas	SP	76382	20648
41	Amroha	Mehboob Ali	SP	74713	Naushad Ali	BSP	59671	15042
42	Hasanpur	Mahender Singh Khadakvanshi	BJP	111269	Kamal Akhtar	SP	83499	27770
Meerut District
43	Siwalkhas	Jitendra Pal Singh	BJP	72842	Ghulam Mohammed	SP	61421	11421
44	Sardhana	Sangeet Singh Som	BJP	97921	Atul Pradhan	SP	76296	21625
45	Hastinapur	Dinesh Khatik	BJP	99436	Yogesh Verma	BSP	63374	36062
46	Kithore	Satyavir Tyagi	BJP	90622	Shahid Manzoor	SP	79800	10822
47	Meerut Cantt	Satya Prakash Agarwal	BJP	132518	Satendra Solanki	BSP	55899	76619
48	Meerut	Rafiq Ansari	SP	103217	Laxmikant Bajpai	BJP	74448	28769
49	Meerut South	Somendra Tomar	BJP	113225	Haji Mohammad Yaqub	BSP	77830	35395
Baghpat District
50	Chhaprauli	Sahender Singh Ramala	RLD	65124	Satender Singh	BJP	61282	3842
51	Baraut	Krishna Pal Malik	BJP	79427	Sahab Singh	RLD	52941	26486
52	Bagpat	Yogesh Dhama	BJP	92566	Ahmed Hameed	BSP	61206	31360
Ghaziabad District
53	Loni	Nand Kishor Gurjar	BJP	113088	Zakir Ali	BSP	70275	42813
54	Muradnagar	Ajit Pal Tyagi	BJP	140759	Sudhan Kumar	BSP	51147	89612
55	Sahibabad	Sunil Kumar Sharma	BJP	262741	Amarpal Sharma	INC	112056	150685
56	Ghaziabad	Atul Garg	BJP	124201	Suresh Bansal	BSP	53696	70505
57	Modinagar	Manju Shiwach	BJP	108631	Wahab Chaudhary	BSP	42049	66582
Hapur District
58	Dholana	Aslam Choudhary	BSP	88580	Ramesh Chand Tomar	BJP	85004	3576
59	Hapur	Vijay Pal	BJP	84532	Gajraj Singh	INC	69526	15006
60	Garhmukteshwar	Kamal Singh Malik	BJP	91086	Prashant Choudhary	BSP	55792	35294
Gautam Buddha Nagar District
61	Noida	Pankaj Singh	BJP	162417	Sunil Choudhary	SP	58401	104016
62	Dadri	Tejpal Singh Nagar	BJP	141226	Satveer Singh Gurjar	BSP	61049	80177
63	Jewar	Dhirendra Singh	BJP	102979	Vedram Bhati	BSP	80806	22173
Bulandshahr District
64	Sikandrabad	Bimla Singh Solanki	BJP	104956	Mohammad Imran	BSP	76333	28623
65	Bulandshahr	Virendra Singh Sirohi	BJP	111538	Mohd. Aleem Khan	BSP	88454	23084
66	Syana	Devendra Singh Lodhi	BJP	125854	Dilnawaz Khan	BSP	54224	71630
67	Anupshahr	Sanjay Sharma	BJP	112431	Gajendra Singh	BSP	52117	60314
68	Debai	Anita Singh Rajput	BJP	111807	Harish Kumar	SP	46177	65630
69	Shikarpur	Anil Kumar	BJP	101912	Mukul Upadhyay	BSP	51667	50245
70	Khurja (SC)	Vijendra Singh Khatik	BJP	119493	Arjun Singh	BSP	55194	64299
Aligarh District
71	Khair (SC)	Anoop Pradhan	BJP	124198	Rakesh Kumar	SP	53477	70721
72	Barauli	Dalveer Singh	BJP	125545	Thakur Jaivir Singh	BSP	86782	38763
73	Atrauli	Sandeep Kumar Singh	BJP	115397	Viresh Yadav	SP	64430	50967
74	Chharra	Thakur Ravendra Pal Singh	BJP	110738	Thakur Rakesh Singh	SP	54604	56134
75	Koil	Anil Parashar	BJP	93814	Shaz Ishaq	SP	42851	50963
76	Aligarh	Sanjeev Raja	BJP	113752	Zafar Alam	SP	98312	15440
77	Iglas (SC)	Rajvir Singh Diler	BJP	128000	Rajendra Kumar	BSP	53200	74800
Hathras District
78	Hathras (SC)	Hari Shankar Mahor	BJP	133840	Braj Mohan Rahi	BSP	63179	70661
79	Sadabad	Ramveer Upadhyay	BSP	91365	Anil Chaudhary	RLD	64775	26587
80	Sikandra Rao	Birendra Singh Rana	BJP	76129	Bani Singh Baghel	BSP	61357	14772
Mathura District
81	Chhata	Chaudhary Laxmi Narayan Singh	BJP	117537	Atul Singh	Ind	53699	63838
82	Mant	Shyam Sunder Sharma	BSP	65862	Yogesh Chaudhary	RLD	65430	432
83	Goverdhan	Karinda Singh	BJP	93538	Rajkumar Rawat	BSP	60529	33009
84	Mathura	Shrikant Sharma	BJP	143361	Pradeep Mathur	INC	42200	101161
85	Baldev (SC)	Pooran Prakash	BJP	88411	Niranjan Singh Dhangar	RLD	75203	13208
Agra District
86	Etmadpur	Ram Pratap Singh	BJP	137381	Dharmpal Singh	BSP	90126	47255
87	Agra Cantonment (SC)	Girraj Singh Dharmesh	BJP	113178	Gutiyari Lal Duwesh	BSP	66853	46325
88	Agra South	Yogendra Upadhyaya	BJP	111882	Zulfiqar Ahmad Bhutto	BSP	57657	54225
89	Agra North	Jagan Prasad Garg	BJP	135120	Er Gyanendra Gautam	BSP	48800	86320
90	Agra Rural (SC)	Hemlata Divakar	BJP	129887	Kali Charan Suman	BSP	64591	65296
91	Fatehpur Sikri	Chau. Udaybhan Singh	BJP	108586	Surajpal Singh	BSP	56249	52337
92	Kheragarh	Mahesh Kumar Goyal	BJP	93510	Bhagvan Singh Kushwaha	BSP	61511	31999
93	Fatehabad	Jitendra Verma	BJP	101960	Rajendra Singh	SP	67596	34364
94	Bah	Rani Pakshalika Singh	BJP	80567	Madhusudan Sharma	BSP	57427	23140
Firozabad District
95	Tundla (SC)	S.P. Singh Baghel	BJP	118584	Rakesh Babu	BSP	62514	56070
96	Jasrana	Ramgopal	BJP	103426	Shiv Pratap Singh	SP	83098	20328
97	Firozabad	Manish Asiza	BJP	102654	Azim Bhai	SP	60927	41727
98	Shikohabad	Mukesh Verma	BJP	87851	Sanjay Kumar	SP	77074	10777
99	Sirsaganj	Hariom Yadav	SP	90281	Jaiveer Singh	BJP	79605	10676
Kasganj District
100	Kasganj	Devendra Singh Rajput	BJP	101908	Hasrat Ullah Sherwani	SP	49878	52030
101	Amanpur	Devendra Pratap	BJP	85199	Virendra Singh	SP	43395	41804
102	Patiyali	Mamtesh	BJP	72414	Kiran Yadav	SP	68643	3771
Etah District
103	Aliganj	Satyapal Singh Rathaur	BJP	88695	Rameshwar Singh Yadav	SP	74844	13851
104	Etah	Vipin Kumar David	BJP	82516	Jugendra Singh Yadav	SP	61387	21129
105	Marhara	Virendra	BJP	92507	Amit Gaurav	SP	59075	33432
106	Jalesar (SC)	Sanjeev Kumar Diwakar	BJP	81502	Ranjeet Suman	SP	61694	19808
Mainpuri District
107	Mainpuri	Rajkumar alias Raju Yadav	SP	75787	Ashok Kumar	BJP	66956	8831
108	Bhongaon	Ram Naresh Agnihorti	BJP	92697	Alok Kumar	SP	72400	20297
109	Kishni (SC)	Brijesh Kumar	SP	80475	Sunil Kumar	BJP	63946	16529
110	Karhal	Sobaran Singh Yadav	SP	104221	Rama Shakya	BJP	65816	38405
Sambhal District
111	Gunnaur	Ajeet Kumar (alias Raju Yadav)	BJP	107344	Ram Khiladi Singh	SP	95958	11386
Budaun District
112	Bisauli (SC)	Kushagra Sagar	BJP	100287	Ashutosh Maurya alisa Raju	SP	89599	10688
113	Sahaswan	Omkar Singh	SP	77543	Arshad Ali	BSP	73274	4269
114	Bilsi	Pt. Radha Krishan Sharma	BJP	82070	Musarrat Ali Bittan	BSP	55091	26979
115	Badaun	Mahesh Chandra Gupta	BJP	87314	Abid Raza Khan	SP	70847	16467
116	Shekhupur	Dharmendra Kumar Singh Shakya	BJP	93702	Ashish Yadav	SP	70316	23386
117	Dataganj	Rajeev Kumar Singh (Dataganj politician) (Babbu Bhaiya)	BJP	79110	Sinod Kumar Shakya (Deepu)	BSP	53351	25759
Bareilly District
118	Baheri	Chhatra Pal Singh	BJP	108846	Naseem Ahmad	BSP	66009	42837
119	Meerganj	D.C. Verma	BJP	108789	Sultan Beg	BSP	54289	54500
120	Bhojipura	Bahoran Lal Maurya	BJP	100381	Shazil Islam Ansari	SP	72617	27764
121	Nawabganj	Kesar Singh	BJP	93711	Bhagwat Saran Gangwar	SP	54569	39142
122	Faridpur (SC)	Shyam Bihari Lal	BJP	83656	Siyaram Sagar	SP	58935	24721
123	Bithari Chainpur	Rajesh Kumar Mishra	BJP	96397	Veer Pal Singh Yadav	SP	76886	19511
124	Bareilly	Arun Kumar	BJP	115270	Prem Prakash Agarwal	INC	86559	28667
125	Bareilly Cantt	Rajesh Agarwal	BJP	88441	Mujahid Hassan Khan	INC	75777	12664
126	Aonla	Dharmpal Singh	BJP	63165	Sidhraj Singh	SP	59619	3546
Pilibhit District
127	Pilibhit	Sanjay Singh Gangwar	BJP	136486	Riaz Ahmad	SP	93130	43356
128	Barkhera	Kishan Lal Rajpoot	BJP	104595	Hemraj Verma	SP	46665	57930
129	Puranpur (SC)	Babu Ram Paswan	BJP	128493	Peetam Ram	SP	89251	39242
130	Bisalpur	Agys Ramsaran Verma	BJP	103498	Anis Ahmad Khan alias Phoolbabu	INC	62502	40996
Shahjahanpur District
131	Katra	Veer Vikram Singh Prince	BJP	76509	Rajesh Yadav	SP	59779	16730
132	Jalalabad	Sharadvir Singh	SP	75326	Manoj Kashyap	BJP	66029	9297
133	Tilhar	Roshan Lal Verma	BJP	81770	Jitin Prasada	INC	76065	5705
134	Powayan (SC)	Chetram	BJP	126635	Shakuntla Devi	SP	54218	72417
135	Shahjahanpur	Suresh Kumar Khanna	BJP	100734	Tanveer Khan	SP	81531	19203
136	Dadraul	Manvendra Singh	BJP	86435	Rammurti Singh Verma	SP	69037	17398
Lakhimpur Kheri District
137	Palia	Harvinder Kumar Sahani	BJP	118069	Saif Ali Naqvi	INC	48841	69228
138	Nighasan	Patel Ramkumar Verma	BJP	107487	Krishna Gopal Patel	SP	61364	46123
139	Gola Gokrannath	Arvind Giri	BJP	122497	Vinay Tiwari	SP	67480	55017
140	Sri Nagar (SC)	Manju Tyagi	BJP	112941	Meera Bano	SP	58002	54939
141	Dhaurahra	Awasthi Bala Prasad	BJP	79809	Yeshpal Singh Chaudhari	SP	76456	3353
142	Lakhimpur	Yogesh Verma	BJP	122677	Utkarsh Verma	SP	84929	37748
143	Kasta (SC)	Saurabh Singh, politician	BJP	92824	Sunil Kumar Lala	SP	68551	24273
144	Mohammdi	Lokendra Pratap Singh	BJP	93000	Sanjay Sharma	INC	59082	33918
Sitapur District
145	Maholi	Shashank Trivedi	BJP	80938	Anoop Kumar Gupta	SP	77221	3717
146	Sitapur	Rakesh Rathore	BJP	98850	Radhey Shyam Jaiswal	SP	74011	24839
147	Hargaon (SC)	Suresh Rahi	BJP	101680	Ramhet Bharti	BSP	56685	4995
148	Laharpur	Suneel Verma	BJP	79467	Md. Jasmeer Ansari	BSP	70349	9118
149	Biswan	Mahendra Singh	BJP	81907	Afzaal Kausar	SP	71672	10235
150	Sevata	Gyan Tiwari	BJP	94697	Er. Mohammad Nasim	BSP	51038	43659
151	Mahmoodabad	Narendra Singh Verma	SP	81469	Asha Maurya	BJP	79563	1906
152	Sidhauli (SC)	Hargovind Bhargava	BSP	78506	Manish Rawat	SP	75996	2510
153	Misrikh (SC)	Ram Krishna Bhargava	BJP	86403	Manish Kumar Rawar	BSP	65731	20672
Hardoi District
154	Sawayazpur	Kunvar Madhavendra Pratap	BJP	92601	Padamrag Singh Yadav	SP	65631	26970
155	Shahabad	Rajani Tiwari	BJP	99624	Asif Khan	BSP	95364	4260
156	Hardoi	Nitin Agarwal	SP	97735	Raja Bux Singh	BJP	92626	5109
157	Gopamau (SC)	Shyam Prakash	BJP	87871	Rajeshwari	SP	56493	31378
158	Sandi (SC)	Prabhash Kumar	BJP	72044	Omendra Kumar Verma	INC	51819	20225
159	Bilgram-Mallanwan	Ashish Kumar Singh	BJP	83405	Subhash Pal	SP	75380	8025
160	Balamau (SC)	Ram Pal Verma	BJP	74917	Neelu Satyarthi	BSP	52029	22888
161	Sandila	Raj Kumar Agrawal	BJP	90362	Abdul Mannan	SP	69959	20403
Unnao District
162	Bangarmau	Kuldeep Singh Sengar	BJP	87657	Badaloo Khan	SP	59330	28237
163	Safipur (SC)	Bamba Lal	BJP	84068	Ram Baran	BSP	56832	27236
164	Mohan (SC)	Brijesh Kumar Rawat	BJP	104884	Radhe Lal Rawat	BSP	50789	54095
165	Unnao	Pankaj Gupta	BJP	119669	Manisha deepak	SP	73597	46072
166	Bhagwantnagar	Hriday Narayan Dikshit	BJP	103698	Shashank Singh	BSP	50332	53366
167	Purwa	Anil Singh	BSP	97567	Uttam Chandra	BJP	71084	26483
Lucknow District
168	Malihabad (SC)	Jai Devi	BJP	94677	Rajbala	SP	72009	22668
169	Bakshi Kaa Talab	Avinash Trivedi	BJP	96482	Nakul Dubey	BSP	78898	17584
170	Sarojini Nagar	Swati Singh	BJP	108506	Anurag Yadav	SP	74327	34179
171	Lucknow West	Suresh Kumar Srivastava	BJP	93022	Mohammad Rehan	SP	79950	13072
172	Lucknow North	Neeraj Bora	BJP	109315	Abhishek Mishra	SP	82039	27276
173	Lucknow East	Ashutosh Tandon	BJP	135167	Anurag Bhadouria	INC	55937	79230
174	Lucknow Central	Brajesh Pathak	BJP	78400	Ravidas Mehrotra	SP	73306	5094
175	Lucknow Cantonment	Rita Bahuguna	BJP	95402	Aparna Yadav	SP	61606	33796
176	Mohanlalganj (SC)	Ambrish Singh Pushkar	SP	71574	Rambahadur	BSP	71044	530
Raebareli District
177	Bachhrawan (SC)	Ram Naresh Rawat	BJP	65324	Shahab Sharan	INC	43015	22309
Amethi District
178	Tiloi	Mayankeshwar Sharan Singh	BJP	96119	Mohd. Saood	BSP	52072	44047
Raebareli District
179	Harchandpur	Rakesh Singh	INC	65104	Kusuma Lodhi	BJP	61452	3652
180	Rae Bareli	Aditi Singh	INC	128319	Mhmd Shabaz Khan	BSP	39156	89163
181	Salon (SC)	Dal Bahadur	BJP	78028	Suresh Chaudary	INC	61973	16055
182	Sareni	Dhirendra Bahadur Singh	BJP	65873	Thakur Prasad Yadav	BSP	52866	13007
183	Unchahar	Manoj Kumar Pandey	SP	59103	Utkrist Maruya	BJP	57169	1934
Amethi District
184	Jagdishpur (SC)	Suresh Kumar	BJP	84219	Radhey Shyam	INC	67619	16600
185	Gauriganj	Rakesh Pratap Singh	SP	77915	Mohammed Nayem	INC	51496	26419
186	Amethi	Garima Singh	BJP	64226	Gaytri Prasad	SP	59161	5065
Sultanpur District
187	Isauli	Abrar Ahmed	SP	51583	Om Prakash Pandey	BJP	47342	4241
188	Sultanpur	Surya Bhan Singh	BJP	86786	Syed Mujeed Ahmad	BSP	54393	32393
189	Sadar	Sitaram Verma	BJP	68950	Raj Prasad Upadhyay	BSP	50177	18773
190	Lambhua	Devmani Dwivedi	BJP	78627	Vinod Singh	BSP	65724	12903
191	Kadipur (SC)	Rajesh Gautam	BJP	87353	Bhageluram	BSP	60749	26604
Farrukhabad District
192	Kaimganj (SC)	Amar Singh	BJP	116304	Surabhi Singh	SP	79779	36622
193	Amritpur	Suhil Kumar Shakya	BJP	93502	Narendra Singh Yadav	SP	52995	40507
194	Farrukhabad	Major Sunil Dutt Dwivedi	BJP	93626	Mohd Umar Khan	BSP	48199	45427
195	Bhojpur	Nagendra Singh Rathore	BJP	93673	Arshad Jamal Siddiqui	SP	58796	34877
Kannauj District
196	Chhibramau	Archana Pandey	BJP	112209	Tahir Hussain Siddiqui	BSP	74985	37224
197	Tirwa	Kailash Singh Rajput	BJP	100426	Vijay Bahadur Pal	SP	76217	24209
198	Kannauj (SC)	Anil Kumar Dohare	SP	99635	Banwari Lal Dohare	BJP	97181	2454
Etawah District
199	Jaswantnagar	Shivpal Singh Yadav	SP	126834	Manish Yadav Patre	BJP	74218	52616
200	Etawah	Sarita Bhadauriya	BJP	91234	Kuldeep Gupta	SP	73892	17342
201	Bharthana (SC)	Savitri Katheria	BJP	82005	Kamlesh Kumar Katheria	SP	80037	1968
Auraiya District
202	Bidhuna	Vinay Shakya	BJP	81905	Dinesh Kumar Verma	SP	77995	3910
203	Dibiyapur	Lakhan Singh	BJP	71480	Pradeep Kumar Yadav	SP	59386	12094
204	Auraiya (SC)	Ramesh Chandra	BJP	83580	Bhimrao Ambedkar	BSP	51718	31862
Kanpur Dehat District
205	Rasulabad (SC)	Nirmala Sankhwar	BJP	88390	Arun Kumari Kori	SP	54996	33394
206	Akbarpur-Raniya	Pratibha Shukla	BJP	87430	Neeraj Singh	SP	58701	28729
207	Sikandra	Mathura Prasad Pal	BJP	87879	Mahendra Katiyar	BSP	49776	38103
208	Bhognipur	Vinod Kumar Katiyar	BJP	71466	Dharmpal Singh Bhadauria	BSP	52461	19005
Kanpur Nagar District
209	Bilhaur (SC)	Bhagwati Prasad Sagar	BJP	102326	Kamlesh Chandra Diwakar	BSP	71160	31166
210	Bithoor	Abhijeet Singh Sanga	BJP	113289	Munindra Shukla	SP	54302	58987
211	Kalyanpur	Neelima Katiyar	BJP	86620	Satish Kumar Nigam	SP	63278	23342
212	Govindnagar	Satyadev Pachauri	BJP	112029	Ambuj Shukla	INC	40520	71509
213	Sishamau	Haji Irfan Solanki	SP	73030	Suresh Awasthi	BJP	67204	5826
214	Arya Nagar	Amitabh Bajpai	SP	70993	Salil Vishnoi	BJP	65270	5723
215	Kidwai Nagar	Mahesh Trivedi	BJP	111407	Ajay Kapoor	INC	77424	33983
216	Kanpur Cantonment	Sohil Akhtar Ansari	INC	81169	Raghunandan Singh Bhadauria	BJP	71805	9364
217	Maharajpur	Satish Mahana	BJP	132394	Manoj Kumar Shukla	BSP	40568	91826
218	Ghatampur (SC)	Kamal Rani	BJP	92776	Saroj Kureel	BSP	47598	45178
Jalaun District
219	Madhogarh	Moolchandra Singh	BJP	108737	Girish Kumar	BSP	62752	45985
220	Kalpi	Ku Narandea Pal Singh	BJP	105988	Chhote Singh	BSP	54504	51484
221	Orai (SC)	Gauri Shankar	BJP	140485	Mahendra Singh	SP	61606	78879
Jhansi District
222	Babina	Rajeev Singh Parichha	BJP	96713	Yashpal Singh Yadav	SP	79876	16837
223	Jhansi Nagar	Ravi Sharma	BJP	117873	Sita Ram Kushwaha	BSP	62095	55778
224	Mauranipur (SC)	Bihari Lal Arya	BJP	98905	Rashmi Arya	SP	81934	16971
225	Garautha	Jawahar Lal Rajput	BJP	93378	Deep Narayan Singh (Deepak Yadav)	SP	77547	15831
Lalitpur District
226	Lalitpur	Ramratan Kushwaha	BJP	156942	Jyoti Singh	SP	88687	68255
227	Mehroni (SC)	Manohar Lal	BJP	159291	Feran Lal	BSP	59727	99564
Hamirpur District
228	Hamirpur	Ashok Kumar Singh Chandel	BJP	110888	Manoj Kumar Prajapati	SP	62233	48655
229	Rath (SC)	Manisha Anuragi	BJP	147526	Gayadeen Anuragi	INC	42883	104643
Mahoba District
230	Mahoba	Rakesh Kumar Goswami	BJP	88291	Siddh Gopal Sahu	SP	56904	31387
231	Charkhari	Brijbhusan Rajpoot alias Guddu Bhaiya	BJP	98360	Urmila Devi	SP	54346	44014
Banda District
232	Tindwari	Brajesh Kumar Prajapati	BJP	82197	Jagdish Prasad Prajapati	BSP	44790	37407
233	Baberu	Chandrapal Kushwaha	BJP	76187	Kiran Yadav	BSP	53886	22301
234	Naraini (SC)	Raj Karan Kabir	BJP	92412	Bharat Lal Diwakar	INC	47405	45007
235	Banda	Prakash Dwivedi	BJP	83169	Madhusudan Kushwaha	BSP	50341	32828
Chitrakoot District
236	Chitrakoot	Chandrika Prasad Upadhyay	BJP	90366	Veer Singh	SP	63430	26936
237	Manikpur	R. K. Singh Patel	BJP	84988	Sampat Patel	INC	40524	44464
Fatehpur District
238	Jahanabad	Jai Kumar Singh Jaiki	AD(S)	81438	Madangopal Verma	SP	33832	47606
239	Bindki	Karan Singh Patel	BJP	97996	Rameshwar Dayal	SP	41618	56378
240	Fatehpur	Vikram Singh	BJP	89481	Chandra Prakash Lodhi	SP	57983	31498
241	Ayah Shah	Vikas Gupta	BJP	81203	Ayodhya Prasad	SP	29238	51965
242	Husainganj	Ranvendra Pratap Singh	BJP	73595	Usha Maurya	INC	55002	18593
243	Khaga (SC)	Krishna Paswan	BJP	94954	Om Prakash Gihar	INC	38520	56434
Pratapgarh District
244	Rampur Khas	Aradhana Misra	INC	81463	Nagesh Pratap Singh	BJP	64397	17066
245	Babaganj (SC)	Vinod Kumar	Ind	87778	Pawan Kumar	BJP	50618	37160
246	Kunda	Raghuraj Pratap Singh	Ind	136597	Janaki Sharan	BJP	32950	103647
247	Vishwanathganj	Rakesh Kumar Verma	AD(S)	81899	Sanjay Pandey	INC	58541	23358
248	Pratapgarh	Sangam Lal Gupta	AD(S)	80828	Nagrenda Singh	SP	46274	34554
249	Patti	Rajendra Pratap Singh	BJP	75011	Ram Singh	SP	73538	1476
250	Raniganj	Dhiraj Ojha	BJP	67031	Shakeel Ahmad Khan	BSP	58022	9009
Kaushambi District
251	Sirathu	Sheetla Prasad	BJP	78621	Vachaspati	SP	52418	26203
252	Manjhanpur (SC)	Lal Bahadur	BJP	92818	Indrajeet Saroj	BSP	88658	4160
253	Chail	Sanjay Kumar	BJP	85713	Talat Azim	INC	45597	40116
Prayagraj District
254	Phaphamau	Vikramjeet	BJP	83239	Ansar Ahmad	SP	57254	25985
255	Soraon (SC)	Jamuna Prasad	AD(S)	77814	Geeta Devi	BSP	60079	17735
256	Phulpur	Praveen Patel	BJP	93912	Mansoor Alam	SP	67299	26613
257	Pratappur	Mohd Mujtaba Siddqui	BSP	66805	Karan Singh	AD(S)	64151	2654
258	Handia	Hakim Lal Bind	BSP	72446	Pramila Devi	AD(S)	63920	8526
259	Meja	Neelam Karwariya	BJP	67807	Ram Sewak Singh	SP	47964	19843
260	Karachhana	Ujjwal Raman Singh	SP	80806	Piyush Ranjan Nishad	BJP	65782	15024
261	Allahabad West	Sidharth Nath Singh	BJP	85518	Richa Singh	SP	60182	25336
262	Allahabad North	Harshvardhan Bajpai	BJP	89191	Anugrah Narayan Singh	INC	54166	35025
263	Allahabad South	Nand Gopal Gupta Nandi	BJP	93011	Parvez Ahmad	SP	64424	28587
264	Bara (SC)	Ajai Kumar	BJP	79209	Ajay	SP	45156	34053
265	Koraon (SC)	Rajmani Kol	BJP	100427	Ram Kripal	INC	46731	53696
Barabanki District
266	Kursi	Sakendra Pratap Verma	BJP	108403	Fareed Kidwai	SP	79724	28679
267	Ramnagar	Sharad Kumar Awasthi	BJP	88937	Arvinda Kumar Singh	SP	66210	22727
268	Barabanki	Dharamraj Singh Yadav	SP	99453	Suredra Singh	BSP	69748	29704
269	Zaidpur (SC)	Upendra Singh	BJP	111064	Tanuj Punia	INC	81883	29181
270	Dariyabad	Satish chandra Sharma	BJP	119173	Rajiv Kumar Singh	SP	68487	50686
Ayodhya District
271	Rudauli	Ram Chandra Yadav	BJP	90311	Abbas Ali Zaidi	SP	59052	31259
Barabanki District
272	Haidergarh (SC)	Baidnath Rawat	BJP	97497	Ram Magan	SP	63977	33520
Ayodhya District
273	Milkipur (SC)	Gorakh Nath	BJP	86960	Awadesh Prasad	SP	58684	28276
274	Bikapur	Shobha Singh Chauhan	BJP	94074	Anand Sen	SP	67422	26652
275	Ayodhya	Ved Prakash Gupta	BJP	107014	Tej Narayan Pandey	SP	56574	50440
276	Goshainganj	Indra Pratap Tiwari	BJP	89586	Abhay Singh	SP	77966	11620
Ambedkar Nagar District
277	Katehari	Lal Ji verma	BSP	84358	Awadesh Kumar Diwedi	BJP	78071	6287
278	Tanda	Sanju Devi	BJP	74768	Azeemul Haq Pahalwan	BSP	73043	1723
279	Alapur (SC)	Anita	BJP	72366	Sangeeta	SP	59853	12513
280	Jalalpur	Ritesh Pandey	BSP	90309	Rajesh Singh	BJP	77279	13030
281	Akbarpur	Ram Achal Rajbhar	BSP	72325	Ram Murti Verma	SP	58312	14013
Bahraich District
282	Balha (SC)	Akshaibar Lal	BJP	104135	Kiran Bharti	BSP	57519	46616
283	Nanpara	Madhuri Verma	BJP	86312	Waris Ali	INC	67643	18669
284	Matera	Yasar Shah	SP	79188	Arun Veer Singh	BJP	77593	1595
285	Mahasi	Sureshwar Singh	BJP	104654	Ali Akbar	INC	45685	58969
286	Bahraich	Anupma Jaiswal	BJP	87479	Rubab Sayeda	SP	80777	6702
287	Payagpur	Subhash Tripathi	BJP	102254	Mukesh Srivastava	SP	60713	41541
288	Kaiserganj	Mukut Bihari	BJP	85212	Khalid Khan	BSP	57849	27363
Shrawasti District
289	Bhinga	Mohammad Aslam	BSP	76040	Alekshendra Kant Singh	BJP	69950	6090
290	Shrawasti	Ram Feran	BJP	79437	Mohd Ramzan	SP	78992	445
Balrampur District
291	Tulsipur	Kailash Nath Shukla	BJP	62296	Zeba Rizwan	INC	43637	18659
292	Gainsari	Shailesh Kumar Singh	BJP	55716	Alauddin	BSP	53413	2303
293	Utraula	Ram Pratap alias Shashikant Verma	BJP	85240	Arif Anwar Hashmi	SP	56066	29174
294	Balrampur (SC)	Palturam	BJP	89401	Shivlal	INC	64541	24860
Gonda District
295	Mehnaun	Vinay Kumar Dwivedi	BJP	84304	Arshad Ali Khan	BSP	47926	36378
296	Gonda	Prateek Bhushan Singh	BJP	58254	Mo Jaleel Khan	BSP	46576	11678
297	Katra Bazar	Bawan Singh	BJP	92095	Baij Nath	SP	61284	30811
298	Colonelganj	Ajay Pratap Singh	BJP	82867	Yogesh Pratap Singh	SP	54462	28405
299	Tarabganj	Prem Narayan Pandey	BJP	100294	Vinod Kumar	SP	61852	38442
300	Mankapur (SC)	Rampati Shastri	BJP	102862	Ramesh Chandra	BSP	42701	60161
301	Gaura	Prabhat Kumar Verma	BJP	72455	Ram Pratap Singh	SP	42600	29855
Siddharthnagar District
302	Shohratgarh	Amar Singh Chaudhary	AD(S)	67653	Mohd Jameel	BSP	45529	22124
303	Kapilvastu (SC)	Shyam Dhani	BJP	114082	Vijay Kumar	SP	75928	38154
304	Bansi	Jai Pratap Singh	BJP	77548	Lal Ji	SP	58606	18942
305	Itwa	Satish Chandra Dwivedi	BJP	59524	Arshad Khursheed	BSP	49316	10208
306	Domariyaganj	Raghvendra Pratap Singh	BJP	67227	Saiyada Khatoon	BSP	67056	171
Basti District
307	Harraiya	Ajay Kumar Singh	BJP	97014	Raj Kishore Singh	SP	66908	30106
308	Kaptanganj	Chandra Prakash	BJP	70527	Ram Prasad Chaudhary	BSP	63700	6827
309	Rudhauli	Sanjay Pratap Jaiswal	BJP	90228	Rajendra Prasad Chaudhary	BSP	68423	21805
310	Basti Sadar	Dayaram Chaudhary	BJP	92697	Mahendra Nath Yadav	SP	50103	42594
311	Mahadewa (SC)	Ravi Kumar Sonkar	BJP	82429	Doodhram	BSP	56545	25884
Sant Kabir Nagar District
312	Menhdawal	Rakesh Singh Baghel	BJP	86976	Anil Kumar Tripathi	BSP	44062	42914
313	Khalilabad	Digvijay Narayan alias Jay Chaubey	BJP	72061	Mashhoor Alam Choudhary	BSP	56024	16037
314	Dhanghata (SC)	Sriram Chauhan	BJP	79572	Agloo Prasad	SP	62663	16909
Maharajganj District
315	Pharenda	Bajrang Bahadur Singh	BJP	76312	Virendra Chaudhary	INC	73958	2354
316	Nautanwa	Aman Mani Tripathi	Ind	79666	Kunwar Kaushal Kishore Singh	SP	47410	32256
317	Siswa	Prem Sagar Patel	BJP	122884	Shivendra Singh	SP	54698	68186
318	Maharajganj (SC)	Jai Mangal	BJP	125154	Nirmesh Mangal	BSP	56793	68361
319	Paniyara	Gyanendra	BJP	119308	Ganesh Shankar Pandey	BSP	51817	67491
Gorakhpur District
320	Caimpiyarganj	Fateh Bahadur Singh	BJP	91636	Chinta Yadav	INC	58782	32854
321	Pipraich	Mahendra Pal Singh	BJP	82739	Aftab Alam	BSP	69930	12809
322	Gorakhpur Urban	Radha Mohan Das Agarwal	BJP	122221	Rana Rahul Singh	INC	61491	60730
323	Gorakhpur Rural	Bipin Singh	BJP	83686	Vijay Bahadur Yadav	SP	79276	4410
324	Sahajanwa	Sheetal Pandey	BJP	72213	Yaspal Singh Rawat	SP	56836	15377
325	Khajani (SC)	Sant Prasad	BJP	71492	Rajkumar	BSP	51413	20079
326	Chauri-Chaura	Sangeeta Yadav	BJP	87863	Manurojan Yadav	SP	42203	45660
327	Bansgaon (SC)	Vimlesh Paswan	BJP	71966	Dharmendra Kumar	BSP	49093	22873
328	Chillupar	Vijay Shankar Tiwari	BSP	78177	Rajesh Tripathi	BJP	74818	3359
Kushinagar District
329	Khadda	Jatashanker Tripathi	BJP	82537	Vijay Pratap Kushwaha	BSP	44040	38497
330	Padrauna	Swami Prasad Maurya	BJP	93649	Javed Iqbal	BSP	53097	40552
331	Tamkuhi Raj	Ajay Kumar Lallu	INC	61211	Jagadish Mishra	BJP	43097	18114
332	Fazilnagar	Ganga	BJP	102778	Vishwnath	SP	60856	41922
333	Kushinagar	Rajnikant Mani Tripathi	BJP	97132	Rajesh Pratap Rao "Banti Bhaiya "	BSP	49029	48103
334	Hata	Pawan Kumar	BJP	103864	Radheshyam Singh	SP	50788	53076
335	Ramkola (SC)	Ramanand Baudh	SBSP	102782	Purnmasi Dehati	SP	47053	55729
Deoria District
336	Rudrapur	Jai Prakash Nishad	BJP	77754	Akhilesh Pratap Singh	INC	50965	26789
337	Deoria	Janmejai Singh	BJP	88030	J.P. Jaiswal	SP	41794	46236
338	Pathardeva	Surya Pratap Shahi	BJP	99812	Shakir Ali	SP	56815	42997
339	Rampur Karkhana	Kamlesh Shukla	BJP	62886	Fasiha Manzer Ghazala Lari	SP	52899	9987
340	Bhatpar Rani	Ashutosh Upadhyay	SP	61862	Jayanth Kushwaha	BJP	50765	11097
341	Salempur (SC)	Kalicharan Prasad	BJP	76175	Vijay Laxmi Gautam	SP	50521	25654
342	Barhaj	Suresh Tiwari	BJP	61996	Murli Manohar Jaiswal	SP	50280	11716
Azamgarh District
343	Atrauliya	Sangram Yadav	SP	74276	Kanhaiya Lal Nishad	BJP	71809	2467
344	Gopalpur	Nafees Ahmad	SP	70980	Shrikrishna Pal	BJP	56020	14960
345	Sagri	Bandana Singh	BSP	62203	Jairam Patel	SP	56728	5475
346	Mubarakpur	Shah Alam	BSP	70705	Akhilesh Yadav	SP	70017	688
347	Azamgarh	Durga Prasad Yadav	SP	88087	Akhilesh	BJP	61825	26262
348	Nizamabad	Alambadi	SP	67274	Chandra Dev Ram	BSP	48745	18529
349	Phoolpur Pawai	Arun Kumar Yadav	BJP	68435	Abul Qais Azmi	BSP	61140	7295
350	Didarganj	Sukhdev Rajbhar	BSP	62125	Adil Sheikh	SP	58480	3645
351	Lalganj (SC)	Azad Ari Mardan	BSP	72715	Daroga Prasad Saroj	BJP	70488	2227
352	Mehnagar (SC)	Kalpnath Paswan	SP	69037	Manjoo Saroj	SBSP	63625	5412
Mau District
353	Madhuban	Dara Singh Chauhan	BJP	86238	Amresh Chand	INC	56823	29415
354	Ghosi	Fagu Chauhan	BJP	88298	Abbas Ansari	BSP	81295	7003
355	Muhammadabad-Gohna (SC)	Shriram Sonkar	BJP	73493	Rajendra	BSP	72955	538
356	Mau	Mukhtar Ansari	BSP	96793	Mahendra Rajbhar	SBSP	88095	8698
Ballia District
357	Belthara Road (SC)	Dhananjay Kannoujia	BJP	77504	Gorakh Paswan	SP	59185	18319
358	Rasara	Umashankar Singh	BSP	92272	Ram Iqball Singh	BJP	58385	33887
359	Sikanderpur	Sanjay Yadav	BJP	69536	Ziauddin Rizwi	SP	45988	23548
360	Phephana	Upendra Tiwari	BJP	70588	Ambika Choudhary	BSP	52691	17897
361	Ballia Nagar	Anand	BJP	92889	Laxman	SP	52878	40011
362	Bansdih	Ram Govind Chaudhary	SP	51201	Ketakee Singh	Ind	49514	1687
363	Bairia	Surendra	BJP	64868	Jai Prakash Anchal	SP	47791	17077
Jaunpur District
364	Badlapur	Ramesh Chandra Mishra	BJP	60237	Lalji Yadav	BSP	57865	2372
365	Shahganj	Shailendra Yadav Lalai	SP	67818	Rana Ajeet Pratap Singh	SBSP	58656	9162
366	Jaunpur	Girish Chandra Yadav	BJP	90324	Nadeem Javed	INC	78040	12284
367	Malhani	Parasnath Yadava	SP	69351	Dhananjay Singh	NISHAD	48141	21210
368	Mungra Badshahpur	Sushma Patel	BSP	69557	Seema Dwivedi	BJP	63637	5920
369	Machhlishahr (SC)	Jagdish Sonkar	SP	72368	Anita Rawat	BJP	68189	4179
370	Mariyahu	Leena Tiwari	AD(S)	58804	Shraddha Yadav	SP	47454	11350
371	Zafrabad	Dr Harendra Prasad Singh	BJP	85989	Sachindra Nath Tripathi	SP	61124	24865
372	Kerakat (SC)	Dinesh Choudahry	BJP	84078	Sajai Kumar Saroj	SP	68819	15259
Ghazipur District
373	Jakhanian (SC)	Triveni Ram	SBSP	84158	Gareeb	SP	79001	5157
374	Saidpur (SC)	Subhash Pasi	SP	76664	Vidyasagar Sonkar	BJP	67954	8710
375	Ghazipur Sadar	Sangeeta Balwant	BJP	92090	Rajesh Kuswaha	SP	59483	32607
376	Jangipur	Virendra Kumar Yadav	SP	71441	Ramesh Narayan Kushwaha	BJP	68202	3239
377	Zahoorabad	Om Prakash Rajbhar	SBSP	86583	Kalicharan	BSP	68502	18081
378	Mohammadabad	Alka Rai	BJP	122156	Sibakatullah Ansari	BSP	89429	32727
379	Zamania	Sunita (politician)	BJP	76823	Atul Kumar	BSP	67559	9264
Chandauli District
380	Mughalsarai	Sadhana Singh (politician)	BJP	87401	Babulal	SP	74158	13243
381	Sakaldiha	Prabhunarayan Yadav	SP	79875	Suryamuni Tiwari	BJP	64906	14969
382	Saiyadraja	Sushil Singh	BJP	78869	Shyam Narayan Singh	BSP	64375	14494
383	Chakia (SC)	Sharada Prasad	BJP	96890	Jitendra Kumar	BSP	76827	20063
Varanasi District
384	Pindra	Avadhesh Singh	BJP	90614	Babulal	BSP	53765	36849
385	Ajagara (SC)	Kailash Nath Sonkar	SBSP	83778	Lalji Sonkar	SP	62429	21349
386	Shivpur	Anil Rajbhar	BJP	110453	Anand Mohan Yadav	SP	56194	54259
387	Rohaniya	Surendra Narayan Singh	BJP	119885	Mahendra Singh Patel	SP	62332	57553
388	Varanasi North	Ravindra Jaiswal	BJP	116017	Abdul Samad Ansari	INC	70515	45502
389	Varanasi South	Neelkanth Tiwari	BJP	92560	Rajesh Mishra	INC	75334	17226
390	Varanasi Cantt.	Saurabh Srivastava	BJP	132609	Anil Srivastava	INC	71283	61326
391	Sevapuri	Neel Ratan Singh Patel Neelu	AD(S)	103423	Surendra Singh Patel	SP	54241	49182
Bhadohi District
392	Bhadohi	Ravindra Nath Tripathi	BJP	79519	Zahid Beg	SP	78414	1105
393	Gyanpur	Vijay Mishra	NISHAD	66448	Mahendra Kumaer Bind	BJP	46218	20230
394	Aurai (SC)	Dinanath Bhaskar	BJP	83325	Madhubala	SP	63546	19779
Mirzapur District
395	Chhanbey (SC)	Rahul Prakash	AD(S)	107007	Dhaneswar	BSP	43539	63468
396	Mirzapur	Ratnakar Mishra	BJP	109196	Kailash Chaurasiya	SP	51784	57412
397	Majhawan	Suchismita Maurya	BJP	107839	Ramesh Chand Bind	BSP	66680	41159
398	Chunar	Anurag Singh	BJP	105608	Jagtamba Singh Patel	SP	43380	62228
399	Marihan	Rama Shankar Singh	BJP	106517	Lalitesh Pati Tripathi	INC	59919	46598
Sonbhadra District
400	Ghorawal	Anil Kumar Maurya	BJP	114305	Ramesh Chandra	SP	56656	57649
401	Robertsganj	Bhupesh Chaubey	BJP	89932	Avinash Kushvaha	SP	49394	40538
402	Obra (ST)	Sanjiv Kumar	BJP	78058	Ravi Gond	SP	33789	44269
403	Duddhi (ST)	Hariram	AD(S)	64399	Vijay Singh Gond	BSP	63314	1085

== Reactions ==
After the BJP emerged as the majority party in the election, Prime Minister Narendra Modi thanked the public in a tweet saying, "Gratitude to the people of India for the continued faith, support and affection for the BJP. This is very humbling & overwhelming." The BJP's UP chief Keshav Prasad Maurya attributed the victory to Modi saying, "It is a Modi wave. The wave which started with 2014 Lok Sabha elections is continuing in 2017 and the momentum will go beyond the 2019 general elections." Congress vice-president Rahul Gandhi sent a tweet to Modi congratulating him for his party's victory, to which Modi replied, "Thank you. Long live democracy!" Modi was congratulated on the victory by U.S. President Donald Trump during a telephone conversation on 27 March 2017.

The BBC wrote that the BJP "appears to have successfully forged a coalition of upper, middle-ranking and lower castes to be able to manipulate the social arithmetic of Indian elections". It also noted that the party successfully avoided the image of "doling out reckless patronage to a caste or group", which the BBC considered responsible for the SP's defeat. Bhanu Joshi of Delhi-based think tank Centre for Policy Research said, "He [Modi] has managed to go beyond the caste arithmetic. On the ground, the BJP is not perceived as a casteist party."

Political scientist Milan Vaishnav felt that the election "represents a referendum on demonetisation". Vaishnav said, "Whether voters were bothered by the implementation of the policy or not, they clearly have decided that the PM is a man of action."

BSP Leader and former Chief Minister Mayavati claimed that the BJP tampered with the Electronic Voting Machines (EVM) thereby rigging the election outcome. However, this charge was rejected by the Election Commission as well as other parties as lacking any substance.

== Bypolls (2017-2022) ==
S.No	Date	Constituency	MLA before election	Party before election	Elected MLA	Party after election
207	21 December 2017	Sikandra	Mathura Prasad Pal	Bharatiya Janata Party	Ajit Singh Pal	Bharatiya Janata Party
24	28 May 2018	Noorpur	Lokendra Singh	Bharatiya Janata Party	Naim Ul Hasan	Samajwadi Party
138	29 April 2019	Nighasan	Patel Ramkumar Verma	Bharatiya Janata Party	Shashank Verma	Bharatiya Janata Party
89	19 May 2019	Agra North	Jagan Prasad Garg	Bharatiya Janata Party	Purshottam Khandelwal	Bharatiya Janata Party
228	23 September 2019	Hamirpur	Ashok Kumar Singh Chandel	Bharatiya Janata Party	Yuvraj Singh	Bharatiya Janata Party
7	21 October 2019	Gangoh	Pradeep Choudhary	Bharatiya Janata Party	Kirat Singh	Bharatiya Janata Party
77	21 October 2019	Iglas	Rajvir Singh Diler	Bharatiya Janata Party	Rajkumar Sahyogi	Bharatiya Janata Party
175	21 October 2019	Lucknow Cantt	Dr. Rita Bahuguna Joshi	Bharatiya Janata Party	Suresh Chandra Tiwari	Bharatiya Janata Party
212	21 October 2019	Govindnagar	Satyadev Pachauri	Bharatiya Janata Party	Surendra Maithani	Bharatiya Janata Party
237	21 October 2019	Manikpur	R. K. Singh Patel	Bharatiya Janata Party	Aanand Shukla	Bharatiya Janata Party
282	21 October 2019	Balha	Akshaibar Lal	Bharatiya Janata Party	Saroj Sonkar	Bharatiya Janata Party
354	21 October 2019	Ghosi	Phagu Chauhan	Bharatiya Janata Party	Vijay Rajbhar	Bharatiya Janata Party
269	21 October 2019	Zaidpur	Upendra Singh Rawat	Bharatiya Janata Party	Gaurav Kumar	Samajwadi Party
37	21 October 2019	Rampur	Mohammad Azam Khan	Samajwadi Party	Dr. Tazeen Fatma	Samajwadi Party
280	21 October 2019	Jalalpur	Ritesh Pandey	Bahujan Samaj Party	Subhash Rai	Samajwadi Party
248	21 October 2019	Pratapgarh	Sangam Lal Gupta	Apna Dal (Sonelal)	Rajkumar Pal	Apna Dal (Sonelal)
40	3 November 2020	Naugawan Sadat	Chetan Chauhan	Bharatiya Janata Party	Sangeeta Chauhan	Bharatiya Janata Party
65	3 November 2020	Bulandshahr	Virendra Singh Sirohi	Bharatiya Janata Party	Usha Sirohi	Bharatiya Janata Party
95	3 November 2020	Tundla	S. P. Singh Baghel	Bharatiya Janata Party	Prempal Singh Dhangar	Bharatiya Janata Party
162	3 November 2020	Bangarmau	Kuldeep Singh Sengar	Bharatiya Janata Party	Shrikant Katiyar	Bharatiya Janata Party
218	3 November 2020	Ghatampur	Kamal Rani Varun	Bharatiya Janata Party	Upendra Nath Paswan	Bharatiya Janata Party
337	3 November 2020	Deoria	Janmejay Singh	Bharatiya Janata Party	Satyaprakash Mani Tripathi	Bharatiya Janata Party
367	3 November 2020	Malhani	Parasnath Yadav	Samajwadi Party	Lucky Yadav	Samajwadi Party

== See also ==
- 2012 elections in India
- 2017 elections in India
- Elections in Uttar Pradesh
- List of constituencies of the Uttar Pradesh Legislative Assembly
