= Abhay Singh =

Abhay Singh may refer to:

- Abhai Singh of Marwar (1702–1749), Raja of the Kingdom of Marwar (Jodhpur)
- Abhay Singh (squash player), Indian squash player
- Abhay Singh (politician), Indian politician
- Abhay Singh Chautala, Indian politician
