= Virendra Singh Sirohi =

Indian politician (1946–2020)

Minister of Revenue; Government of Uttar Pradesh
- In office 27 March 1997 – 8 March 2002
- Chief Minister: Mayawati; Kalyan Singh; Ram Prakash Gupta; Rajnath Singh
- Succeeded by: Ravi Gautam

Member of Uttar Pradesh Legislative Assembly
- In office 2017–2020
- Preceded by: Mohammad Aleem Khan
- Succeeded by: Usha Sirohi
- Constituency: Bulandshahr
- In office 2007–2012
- Preceded by: Kiran Pal Singh
- Succeeded by: constituency defunct
- Constituency: Agota
- In office 1996–2002
- Preceded by: Kiran Pal Singh
- Succeeded by: Kiran Pal Singh
- Constituency: Agota

Personal details
- Born: 14 May 1946 Bulandshahr, United Provinces, British India
- Died: 2 March 2020 (aged 73) Delhi, India
- Party: Bharatiya Janata Party
- Spouse: Usha Sirohi (m. 1971–2020)
- Children: 2 sons
- Parent: Tikam Singh Sirohi (father)
- Education: Bachelor of Laws; Bachelor of Science

Virendra Singh Sirohi (5 May 1946 - 2 March 2020) was an Indian politician who was the Member of the Uttar Pradesh Legislative Assembly from Bulandshahr. In 2017 Uttar Pradesh Legislative Assembly election, he contested and won as a Bharatiya Janata Party candidate. He was the Revenue minister in the cabinet of Kalyan Singh, Mayawati Ram Prakash Gupta and Rajnath Singh.
