= Ajit Singh Pal =

Indian politician

Ajit Singh Pal अजीत सिंह पाल

Minister of State for Electronics and Information Technology, Government of Uttar Pradesh
- Incumbent
- Assumed office 21 August 2019
- Chief Minister: Yogi Adityanath

Member of the Uttar Pradesh legislative assembly
- Incumbent
- Assumed office 24 December 2017
- Preceded by: Mathura Prasad Pal
- Constituency: Sikandra

Personal details
- Born: 21 August 1978 (age 48) Maidu-Taharpur
- Party: Bharatiya Janata Party
- Parent: Mathura Prasad Pal
- Education: BTech, MTech, MBA
- Profession: Chemical Engineer, Social Work, Agriculture, Politician

Ajit Singh Pal is an Indian politician and Minister of State in the Government of Uttar Pradesh. He is a member of the Uttar Pradesh Legislative Assembly from Sikandra assembly constituency of Kanpur Dehat district.
