= Indra Pratap Tiwari =

Indian politician

Member of Uttar Pradesh Legislative Assembly
- In office March 2017 – December 2021
- Preceded by: Abhay Singh
- Succeeded by: Abhay Singh
- Constituency: Goshainganj

Personal details
- Born: 27 October 1970 (age 55) Faizabad, Uttar Pradesh, India
- Party: Bharatiya Janata Party (2016-present)
- Other political affiliations: Bahujan Samaj Party (2012-2016), Samajwadi Party (till 2012)
- Spouse: Aarti Tiwari (m. 2018)
- Profession: Agriculturalist, social worker
- Nickname: Khabbu Tiwari

Indra Pratap "Khabbu" Tiwari (born 27 October 1970) is an Indian politician and a former member of the Uttar Pradesh Legislative Assembly. He had represented the Goshainganj constituency as a Bharatiya Janata Party candidate in the 17th Legislative Assembly of Uttar Pradesh. He is a former member of Samajwadi Party and Bahujan Samaj Party.

== Personal life ==
Tiwari was born to Krishan Gopal Tiwari on 27 October 1970 in the Faizabad city of Uttar Pradesh. He completed intermediate education from Bachhulal Inter College, Pura Bazar in 1989. Tiwari is an agriculturalist and social worker. He married Aarti Tiwari, a postgraduate from Gonda, on 31 May 2018.

== Political career ==
A strongman of state politics, Tiwari started off as a student leader. In 2007, he lost as a Samajwadi Party candidate. In the 2012 Uttar Pradesh Legislative Assembly election, contesting as a Bahujan Samaj Party candidate from Goshainganj, Tiwari was defeated by Samajwadi Party's Abhay Singh.

Tiwari joined Bharatiya Janata Party in 2016, and went on to defeat rival Abhay Singh by a margin of 11,620 votes in the 2017 Uttar Pradesh Legislative Assembly election for the Goshainganj seat. In December 2021, Tiwari lost his membership to the Uttar Pradesh Legislative Assembly after being convicted and jailed in October that year in a fake marksheet case. In the following 2022 Uttar Pradesh Legislative Assembly election, Tiwari's wife Aarti represented the party for the vacant seat, but lost to Abhay Singh by a margin of 13,079 votes.

== Conviction and release ==
In October 2021, Tiwari, along with two others, was convicted in a 29-year-old case filed in 1992 by the principal of Saket College for taking admission in B.Sc third-year based on fake marksheets, despite failing in the B.Sc second-year examination in 1990. He was removed from his position in the Uttar Pradesh Assembly and incarcerated. Tiwari was released on bail in September 2022.
