= Hariram (politician) =

Indian politician

Hariram Chero

MLA, 17th Legislative Assembly
- In office 2017–2022
- Constituency: Dudhi, Sonbhadra district

Personal details
- Party: Apna Dal (Sonelal)
- Parent: Kailash
- Occupation: Agriculture
- Profession: Politician

Hariram Chero is an Indian politician. He was a member of 17th Legislative Assembly of Duddhi, Uttar Pradesh of India. A member of the Apna Dal (Sonelal) party, he represented the Dudhi constituency of Uttar Pradesh.

== Political career ==
Hariram won from Duddhi Constituency, a reserved Constituency for Scheduled Tribes, in the 2017 Uttar Pradesh Legislative Assembly election by defeating Vijay Singh Gond of Bahujan Samaj Party by a margin of 1085 votes.

== Posts held ==
| # | From | To | Position | Comments |
|---|---|---|---|---|
| 01 | 2017 | 2022 | Member, 17th Legislative Assembly | |

== See also ==
- Uttar Pradesh Legislative Assembly
