= Bulandshahr Assembly constituency =

Constituency in Uttar Pradesh, India

Bulandshahr
- Constituency No. 65 for the Uttar Pradesh Legislative Assembly

Constituency details
- Country: India
- Region: North India
- State: Uttar Pradesh
- District: Bulandshahar
- Lok Sabha constituency: Bulandshahr
- Established: 1951
- Total electors: 337,612 (2012)
- Reservation: None

Member of Legislative Assembly
- 18th Uttar Pradesh Legislative Assembly
- Incumbent Pradeep Kumar Chaudhary
- Party: Bharatiya Janata Party
- Alliance: NDA
- Elected year: 2022

Bulandshahr Assembly constituency is one of the 403 constituencies of the Uttar Pradesh Legislative Assembly, India. It is a part of the Bulandshahar district and one of the five assembly constituencies in the Bulandshahr Lok Sabha constituency. First election in this assembly constituency was held in 1952 after the "DPACO (1951)" (delimitation order) was passed in 1951. After the "Delimitation of Parliamentary and Assembly Constituencies Order" was passed in 2008, the constituency was assigned identification number 65.

== Wards / Areas ==
Extent of Bulandshahr Assembly constituency is KC Baran, PCs Luharli, Joligarh, Akhtayarpur, Sharifpur Bhainsroli, Lohgra, Ginora Shekh, Nimchana, Agouta, Sihi, Khangawali, Karimnagar Banboi, Partabpur, Salavatnagar Gangawali, Aulena of Agouta KC & Bulandshahr MB of Bulandshahr Tehsil.

== Members of the Legislative Assembly ==
#	Term	Name	Party	From	To	Days	Comments	Ref
01	01st Vidhan Sabha	Banarsi Das	Indian National Congress	May-1952	Mar-1957	1,776	-	
02	02nd Vidhan Sabha	Raghuraj Singh	Praja Socialist Party	Apr-1957	Mar-1962	1,800	-	
03	03rd Vidhan Sabha	Irrtiza Husain	Indian National Congress	Mar-1962	Mar-1967	1,828	-	
04	04th Vidhan Sabha	Shamim Alam	Republic Party of India	Mar-1967	Apr-1968	402	-	
05	05th Vidhan Sabha	Shamim Alam	Republic Party of India	Feb-1969	Mar-1974	1,832	-	
06	06th Vidhan Sabha	Satyabir	Bharatiya Jana Sangh	Mar-1974	Apr-1977	1,153	-	
07	07th Vidhan Sabha	Vijai Raj Singh	Janata Party	Jun-1977	Feb-1980	969	-	
08	08th Vidhan Sabha	S. Saidul Hasan	Indian National Congress (I)	Jun-1980	Mar-1985	1,735	-	
09	09th Vidhan Sabha	S. Saidul Hasan	Indian National Congress	Mar-1985	Nov-1989	1,725	-	
10	10th Vidhan Sabha	D. P. Yadav	Janata Dal	Dec-1989	Apr-1991	488	-	
11	11th Vidhan Sabha	D. P. Yadav	Janata Party (Secular)	Jun-1991	Dec-1992	533	-	
12	12th Vidhan Sabha	D. P. Yadav	Samajwadi Party	Dec-1993	Oct-1995	693	-	
13	13th Vidhan Sabha	Mahendra Singh Yadav	Bharatiya Janata Party	Oct-1996	May-2002	1,967	-	
14	14th Vidhan Sabha	Mahendra Singh Yadav	Bharatiya Janata Party	Feb-2002	May-2007	1,902	-	
15	15th Vidhan Sabha	Mohd. Aleem Khan	Bahujan Samaj Party	May-2007	Mar-2012	1,762	-	
16	16th Vidhan Sabha	Mohd. Aleem Khan	Bahujan Samaj Party	Mar-2012	Mar-2017	-	-	
17	17th Vidhan Sabha	Virendra Singh Sirohi	Bharatiya Janata Party	Mar-2017	March 2020 (Died)			
	17th Vidhan Sabha (by-poll)	Usha Sirohi	Bharatiya Janata Party	Nov 2020	Mar 2022			
18	18th Vidhan Sabha	Pradeep Kumar Chaudhary	Bharatiya Janta Party	Mar 2022	Incumbent	-		

== Election results ==
=== 2027 ===
2027 Uttar Pradesh Legislative Assembly election: Bulandshahr
Party	Candidate	Votes	%	±%
INDIA				
NDA				
BSP				
NOTA	None of the above			
Majority				
Turnout				
gain from		Swing		

=== 2022 ===
2022 Uttar Pradesh Legislative Assembly election: Bulandshahr
Party	Candidate	Votes	%	±%
BJP	Pradeep Kumar Chaudhary	127,076	48.94	+5.13
RLD	Mohammad Yunus	101,246	38.99	+35.38
BSP	Mohd Mobin Qureshi	24,373	9.39	−23.69
INC	Sushil Chaudhary	2,761	1.06	−4.04
AAP	Vikas Sharma	1,430	0.55	New
NOTA	None of the above	1,073	0.41	−0.19
Majority		25,830	9.95	−0.78
Turnout		259,670	64.95	+12.96
BJP hold		Swing		

=== 2020 bypoll ===
By-elections, 2020: Bulandshahr
Party	Candidate	Votes	%	±%
BJP	Usha Sirohi	88,645	43.81	−1.70
BSP	Mohammad Yunus	66,943	33.08	−3.01
ASP(KR)	Mohammad Yameen	13,530	6.69	
INC	Sushil Chaudhary	10,319	5.10	−
RLD	Praveen Kumar Singh	7,286	3.61	−3.41
AIMIM	Dilshad Ahmad	4,757	2.35	
Rashtrawadi Janlok Party (Satya)	Prithviraj Singh	2,944	1.45	
RTKP	Urmila Devi	1,898	0.94	
NOTA	None of the above	979	0.48	−0.19
Majority		21,702	10.73	+1.31
Turnout		202,352	51.99	−12.28
BJP hold		Swing		

=== 2017 ===
2017 Uttar Pradesh Legislative Assembly Election: Bulandshahr
Party	Candidate	Votes	%	±%
BJP	Virendra Singh Sirohi	111,538	45.51	
BSP	Mohammad Aleem Khan	88,454	36.09	
SP	Shujat Alam	24,119	9.84	
RLD	Shribhagwan Sharma	17,216	7.02	
NOTA	None of the above	1,638	0.67	
Majority		23,084	9.42	
Turnout		245,082	64.27	

=== 2012 ===
2012 Uttar Pradesh legislative assembly election: Bulandshahr
Party	Candidate	Votes	%	±%
BSP	Mohammad Aleem Khan	76,646	37.18	−
BJP	Virendra Singh Sirohi	69,699	33.81	−
RLD	Mustafa Hussain	21,284	10.32	−
	Remainder 11 candidates	38,531	18.68	−
Majority		6,947	3.37	−
Turnout		206,160	61.06	−
BSP hold		Swing		

== See also ==
- Bulandshahr Lok Sabha constituency
- Bulandshahar district
- Sixteenth Legislative Assembly of Uttar Pradesh
- Uttar Pradesh Legislative Assembly
