= Sikandra, Uttar Pradesh Assembly constituency =

Constituency of the Uttar Pradesh legislative assembly in India

Sikandra
- Constituency No. 207 for the Uttar Pradesh Legislative Assembly

Constituency details
- Country: India
- Region: North India
- State: Uttar Pradesh
- District: Kanpur Dehat
- Total electors: 3,16,055 (2017)
- Reservation: None

Member of Legislative Assembly
- 18th Uttar Pradesh Legislative Assembly
- Incumbent Ajit Singh Pal
- Party: Bharatiya Janta Party
- Elected year: 2019

Sikandra Assembly constituency is a part of the Kanpur Dehat district of Uttar Pradesh and it comes under Etawah Lok Sabha constituency.

== Members of Legislative Assembly ==
Election	Member	Party
2012	Indra Pal Singh	Bahujan Samaj Party
2017	Mathura Prasad Pal	Bharatiya Janata Party
2017*	Ajit Singh Pal	Bharatiya Janata Party
2022	Ajit Singh Pal	Bharatiya Janata Party

- *By Poll

== Election results ==
=== 2027 ===
2027 Uttar Pradesh Legislative Assembly election: Sikandra
Party	Candidate	Votes	%	±%
INDIA				
NDA				
BSP				
NOTA	None of the above			
Majority				
Turnout				
gain from		Swing		

=== 2022 ===
2022 Uttar Pradesh Legislative Assembly election: Sikandra
Party	Candidate	Votes	%	±%
BJP	Ajit Singh Pal	89,461	44.89	▼0.47
SP	Prabhakar Pandey	57,894	29.05	▲7.37
BSP	Lalji Shukla	36,033	18.08	▼7.61
Independent	Shubham Pal	6,180	3.1	
INC	Naresh Chandra	5,162	2.59	
NOTA	None of the above	1,395	0.7	▼0.05
Majority		31,567	15.84	▼3.83
Turnout		199,307	60.1	▼0.21

=== 2017 bypoll ===
By Election, 2017: Sikandra
Party	Candidate	Votes	%	±%
BJP	Ajit Singh Pal	73,325	44.86	
SP	Seema Sachan	61,455	37.60	
INC	Prabhakar Pandey	19,090	11.68	
IND.	Brajendra Trivedi	3,614	2.21	
IND.	Santosh Shukla	1,120	0.69	
NOTA	None of the Above	1,418	0.87	
Majority		11,870	7.26	
Turnout		1,63,443	50.68	
BJP hold		Swing		

=== 2017 ===
2017 Uttar Pradesh Legislative Assembly election: Sikandra
Party	Candidate	Votes	%	±%
BJP	Mathura Prasad Pal	87,879	45.36	
BSP	Mahendra Katiyar	49,776	25.69	
SP	Seema Sachan	42,010	21.68	
NISHAD	Prabhakar Pandey	6,381	3.29	
Jan Adhikar Party	Mithlesh Katiyar	1,961	1.01	
NOTA	None of the above	1,442	0.75	
Majority		38,103	19.67	
Turnout		193,753	60.31	
BJP gain from BSP		Swing		

=== 2012 ===
2012 Uttar Pradesh Legislative Assembly election: Sikandra
Party	Candidate	Votes	%	±%
BSP	Indra Pal Singh	54,482	29.88	
BJP	Devendra Singh Bhole	52,293	28.68	
SP	Kamlesh Kumar Pathak	46,271	25.38	
INC	Lalla Man Singh	14,541	7.97	
MD	Sushila Mishra	4,377	2.40	
Majority		2,189	1.20	
Turnout		1,82,334	61.44	
BSP win (new seat)				

== See also ==
- Akbarpur-Raniya Assembly constituency
- Bhognipur Assembly constituency
- Rasulabad Assembly constituency
