= Chharra Assembly constituency =

Constituency of the Uttar Pradesh legislative assembly in India

Chharra
- Constituency No. 74 for the Uttar Pradesh Legislative Assembly

Constituency details
- Country: India
- Region: North India
- State: Uttar Pradesh
- District: Aligarh
- Established: 2008
- Total electors: 304,457 (2012)
- Reservation: None

Member of Legislative Assembly
- 18th Uttar Pradesh Legislative Assembly
- Incumbent Ravendra Pal Singh
- Party: Bharatiya Janata Party

Chharra is one of the 403 constituencies of the Uttar Pradesh Legislative Assembly, India. It is a part of the Aligarh district and one of the five assembly constituencies in the Hathras Lok Sabha constituency. First election in this assembly constituency was held in 2012 after the "Delimitation of Parliamentary and Assembly Constituencies Order, 2008" was passed and the constituency was formed in 2008. The constituency is assigned identification number 74.

== Wards / Areas ==
Extent of Chharra Assembly constituency is KC Chharra, PCs Barala, Dilalpur Sunhera, Nausha, Tikta Arni of Barala KC & Chharra NP of Atrauli Tehsil; KCs Akarabad, Vijaygarh, PCs Sidhauli, Asadpur Kiam, Grusikharan, Shahajahanpur Tajpur, Ekari, Changari, Imlani, Budhansi, Jalali-II, Alahdadpur, Bhojpur of Jalali KC, Jalali NP, Pilkhana NP, Kodiaganj NP & Vijaygarh NP of Koil Tehsil.

== Members of the Legislative Assembly ==
| Election | Name | Party |
|---|---|---|
| 2012 | Rakesh Kumar | Samajwadi Party |
| 2017 | Ravendra Pal Singh | Bharatiya Janata Party |
| 2022 | Ravendra Pal Singh | Bharatiya Janata Party |

== Election results ==
=== 2027 ===
2027 Uttar Pradesh Legislative Assembly election: Chharra
| Party | Candidate | Votes | % | ±% |
|---|---|---|---|---|
| INDIA | | | | |
| NDA | | | | |
| BSP | | | | |
| NOTA | None of the above | | | |
| Majority | | | | |
| Turnout | | | | |
| gain from | | Swing | | |

=== 2022 ===
2022 Uttar Pradesh Legislative Assembly election: Chharra
| Party | Candidate | Votes | % | ±% |
|---|---|---|---|---|
| BJP | Ravendra Pal Singh | 111,293 | 45.79 | −2.57 |
| SP | Laxmi Dhangar | 86,966 | 35.78 | +11.94 |
| BSP | Tilak Raj | 37,558 | 15.45 | −8.07 |
| NOTA | None of the above | 1,027 | 0.42 | −0.13 |
| Majority | | 24,327 | 10.01 | −14.51 |
| Turnout | | 243,058 | 62.79 | −0.75 |
| BJP hold | | Swing | | |

=== 2017 ===
2017 Uttar Pradesh Legislative Assembly Election: Chharra
| Party | Candidate | Votes | % | ±% |
|---|---|---|---|---|
| BJP | Ravendra Pal Singh | 110,738 | 48.36 | |
| SP | Thakur Rakesh Singh | 54,604 | 23.84 | |
| BSP | Muhammad Sagir | 53,859 | 23.52 | |
| Jan Adhikar Manch | Jai Prakash Pal | 2,508 | 1.1 | |
| NOTA | None of the above | 1,250 | 0.55 | |
| Majority | | 56,134 | 24.52 | |
| Turnout | | 229,000 | 63.54 | |
| BJP gain from SP | | Swing | | |

=== 2012 ===
2012 Uttar Pradesh Legislative Assembly election: Chharra
| Party | Candidate | Votes | % | ±% |
|---|---|---|---|---|
| SP | Rakesh Kumar | 54,150 | 27.96 | − |
| BSP | Mool Chand Baghel | 49,364 | 25.49 | − |
| Independent | Ravendra Pal Singh | 24,526 | 12.66 | − |
| | Remainder 21 candidates | 65,619 | 33.89 | − |
| Majority | | 4,786 | 2.47 | − |
| Turnout | | 193,659 | 63.61 | − |
| SP hold | | Swing | | |

== See also ==
- Aligarh district
- Hathras Lok Sabha constituency
- Uttar Pradesh Legislative Assembly
