= Ramdular Gaur =

Indian politician

Ramdular Gond

Member of the Uttar Pradesh Legislative Assembly
- In office March 2022 – December 2023
- Constituency: Duddhi Assembly constituency

Personal details
- Born: 1973 (age 52–53)
- Party: Bharatiya Janata Party
- Occupation: Politician

Ramdular Gond (born 1973) is an Indian politician from Uttar Pradesh. He is an Ex-member of the Uttar Pradesh Legislative Assembly from Duddhi Assembly constituency, which is reserved for Scheduled Tribe community, in Sonbhadra district. He won the 2022 Uttar Pradesh Legislative Assembly election representing the Bharatiya Janata Party.

== Early life and education ==
Gaur is from Duddhi, Sonbhadra district, Uttar Pradesh. He is the son of late Ramdhani. He studied intermediate at Choukdi Choura Inter College, Ghazipur, Uttar Pradesh and passed the examinations conducted by Board of Secondary Education, Uttar Pradesh in 1992.

== Career ==
Gaur won from Duddhi Assembly constituency representing Bharatiya Janata Party in the 2022 Uttar Pradesh Legislative Assembly election. He polled 84,407 votes and defeated his nearest rival, Vijay Singh Gond of the Samajwadi Party, by a margin of 6,297 votes.

He was convicted by a court on 12 December 2023 and sentenced to 25 years of imprisonment in a Protection of Children from Sexual Offences case pertaining to the rape of a minor girl in November 2014. After the conviction, he was disqualified from the house and a by election was held in 2023 for the Duddhi seat.
