= Goshainganj Assembly constituency =

Constituency of the Uttar Pradesh legislative assembly in India

Coordinates: 26.57°N 82.38°E

Goshainganj
- Constituency No. 276 for the Uttar Pradesh Legislative Assembly

Constituency details
- Country: India
- Region: North India
- State: Uttar Pradesh
- District: Ayodhya
- Lok Sabha constituency: Ambedkar Nagar
- Total electors: 3,95,118
- Reservation: None

Member of Legislative Assembly
- 18th Uttar Pradesh Legislative Assembly
- Incumbent Abhay Singh
- Party: Independent (BJP supported)
- Elected year: 2022

Goshainganj is a constituency of the Uttar Pradesh Legislative Assembly covering the city of Goshainganj in the Ayodhya district of Uttar Pradesh, India. Since 2008, this assembly constituency is numbered 276 amongst 403 constituencies.

== Members of the Legislative Assembly ==
Election	Name	Party
Till 2012 : Constituency did not exist
2012	Abhay Singh	Samajwadi Party
2017	Indra Pratap Tiwari	Bharatiya Janata Party
2022	Abhay Singh	Samajwadi Party (Note: Expelled from the Samajwadi Party in 2024.)

== Election results ==
=== 2027 ===
2027 Uttar Pradesh Legislative Assembly election: Goshainganj
Party	Candidate	Votes	%	±%
INDIA				
NDA				
BSP				
NOTA	None of the above			
Majority				
Turnout				
gain from		Swing		

=== 2022 ===
The constituency was won by Samajwadi Party member Abhay Singh, who won in the 2022 elections, defeating Bharatiya Janata Party candidate Aarti Tiwari by a margin of 13,079 votes.

2022 Uttar Pradesh Legislative Assembly election: Goshainganj
Party	Candidate	Votes	%	±%
SP	Abhay Singh	105,863	43.87	+9.57
BJP	Aarti Tiwari	92,784	38.45	−0.96
BSP	Ram Sagar	37,271	15.45	−5.02
NOTA	None of the above	1,747	0.72	−0.56
Majority		13,079	5.42	+0.31
Turnout		241,298	61.07	+0.63
SP gain from BJP		Swing		

=== 2017 ===
2017 Uttar Pradesh Legislative Assembly election: Goshainganj
Party	Candidate	Votes	%	±%
BJP	Indra Pratap Alias Khabbu Tiwari	89,586	39.41	
SP	Abhay Singh	77,966	34.3	
BSP	Dharmraj Nishad	46,528	20.47	
NISHAD	Ram Nayan	5,137	2.26	
NOTA	None of the above	2,878	1.28	
Majority		11,620	5.11	
Turnout		227,339	60.44	
