= Nardeo Singh =

Indian politician

Member of the Uttar Pradesh Legislative Assembly
- In office 1962–1968
- Constituency: Chandpur

Nardeo Singh is an Indian politician and a member of the 2nd, 3rd and 4th Legislative Assembly of Uttar Pradesh, in India. He represented the Chandpur Assembly constituency and is an Independent politician
