= Ameer Uddin =

Indian politician

Ameeruddeen

8th Legislative Assembly of Uttar Pradesh
- In office Jun 1980 – Mar 1985
- Constituency: Chandpur

Personal details
- Party: Indian National Congress

Ameer Uddin is an Indian politician and a member of the 8th Legislative Assembly of Uttar Pradesh who represented Chandpur for the party of Indian National Congress (U), in office from June 1980 to March 1985.
