= Iqbal (politician) =

Indian politician

Mohammad Iqbal

MLA, 16th Legislative Assembly
- In office March 2012 – March 2017
- Preceded by: Self
- Succeeded by: Kamlesh Saini
- Constituency: Chandpur

MLA, 15th Legislative Assembly
- In office March 2007 – March 2012
- Preceded by: Swami Omvesh
- Succeeded by: Self
- Constituency: Chandpur

Personal details
- Born: 2 February 1954 (age 72) Bijnor district, Uttar Pradesh
- Citizenship: India
- Party: Bahujan Samaj Party
- Parent: Abdul Gafur (father)
- Profession: Businessperson, politician

Mohammad Iqbal is an Indian politician and a member of the 15th and 16th Legislative Assembly of Uttar Pradesh of India. He represents the Chandpur constituency of Uttar Pradesh and is a member of the Bahujan Samaj Party political party.

== Early life and education ==
Iqbal was born in Bijnor district, Uttar Pradesh. He received education till twelfth grade. Before being elected as MLA, he used to work as a businessperson.

== Political career ==
Iqbal has been a MLA for two straight terms and represents the Chandpur constituency. He is a member of the Bahujan Samaj Party political party.

== Posts held ==
#	From	To	Position	Comments
01	March 2007	March 2012	Member, 15th Legislative Assembly	
02	March 2012	March 2017	Member, 16th Legislative Assembly	

== See also ==
- Chandpur
- Uttar Pradesh Legislative Assembly
- Government of India
- Politics of India
- Bahujan Samaj Party
