= Chandpur Assembly constituency =

Constituency of the Uttar Pradesh legislative assembly in India

Chandpur
- Constituency No. 23 for the Uttar Pradesh Legislative Assembly

Constituency details
- Country: India
- Region: North India
- State: Uttar Pradesh
- District: Bijnor
- Total electors: 278,379 (2012)
- Reservation: None

Member of Legislative Assembly
- 18th Uttar Pradesh Legislative Assembly
- Incumbent Swami Omvesh
- Party: Samajwadi Party
- Alliance: Indian National Developmental Inclusive Alliance
- Elected year: 2022

Chandpur Assembly constituency is one of the 403 constituencies of the Uttar Pradesh Legislative Assembly, India. It is a part of the Bijnor district and one of the five assembly constituencies in the Bijnor Lok Sabha constituency. First election in this assembly constituency was held in 1957 after the delimitation order (DPACO – 1956) was passed in 1956. The constituency was assigned identification number 23 after "Delimitation of Parliamentary and Assembly Constituencies Order, 2008" was passed in the year 2008.

== Wards / Areas ==
Extent of Chandpur Assembly constituency is KCs Chandpur, Basta, PCs Aurangabad, Azamgarh Urf Ratangarh, Azampur, Dharupur, Dhundli, Govli, Heempur Bujurg, Jujhaila, Majhaula Gujar, Murahat, Dhammalpuri, Phoona, Yusufa of Phoona KC & Chandpur MB of Chandpur Tehsil.

== Members of the Legislative Assembly ==
| Year | Member | Party |
|---|---|---|
| 1957 | Nardeo Singh | Independent |
| 1962 | Nardeo Singh | Independent |
| 1967 | Nardeo Singh | Independent |
| 1969 | Shiv Mahendar Singh | Bharatiya Kranti Dal |
| 1974 | Dharam Vir Singh | Bharatiya Kranti Dal |
| 1977 | Dharam Vir Singh | Janata Party |
| 1980 | Ameer Uddin | Indian National Congress (U) |
| 1985 | Kunwar Devendra Singh | Indian National Congress |
| 1989 | Tejpal Singh | Janata Dal |
| 1991 | Amar Singh | Bharatiya Janata Party |
| 1993 | Tejpal Singh | Independent |
| 1996 | Swami Omvesh | Independent |
| 2002 | Swami Omvesh | Rashtriya Lok Dal |
| 2007 | Mohammad Iqbal | Bahujan Samaj Party |
| 2012 | Mohammad Iqbal | Bahujan Samaj Party |
| 2017 | Kamlesh Saini | Bharatiya Janata Party |
| 2022 | Swami Omvesh | Samajwadi Party |

== Election results ==
=== 2027 ===
2027 Uttar Pradesh Legislative Assembly election: Chandpur
| Party | Candidate | Votes | % | ±% |
|---|---|---|---|---|
| INDIA | | | | |
| NDA | | | | |
| BSP | | | | |
| NOTA | None of the above | | | |
| Majority | | | | |
| Turnout | | | | |
| gain from | | Swing | | |

=== 2022 ===
2022 Uttar Pradesh Legislative Assembly election: Chandpur
| Party | Candidate | Votes | % | ±% |
|---|---|---|---|---|
| SP | Swami Omvesh | 90,522 | 40.34 | +23.62 |
| BJP | Kamlesh Saini | 90,288 | 40.24 | −2.03 |
| BSP | Shakeel Ahmad | 37,359 | 16.65 | −9.3 |
| NOTA | None of the above | 854 | 0.38 | −0.05 |
| Majority | | 234 | 0.1 | −16.22 |
| Turnout | | 224,374 | 68.86 | −0.98 |
| SP gain from BJP | | Swing | | |

=== 2017 ===
2017 Uttar Pradesh Legislative Assembly election: Chandpur
| Party | Candidate | Votes | % | ±% |
|---|---|---|---|---|
| BJP | Kamlesh Saini | 92,345 | 42.27 | |
| BSP | Mohammad Iqbal | 56,696 | 25.95 | |
| SP | Mohammad Arshad | 36,531 | 16.72 | |
| INC | Sherbaaz Khan | 15,826 | 7.24 | |
| RLD | Surendra Kumar Verma | 11,880 | 5.44 | |
| NOTA | None of the above | 932 | 0.43 | |
| Majority | | 35,649 | 16.32 | |
| Turnout | | 218,484 | 69.84 | |
| BJP gain from BSP | | Swing | | |

=== 2012 ===
16th Vidhan Sabha: 2012 General Elections

2012 General Elections: Chandpur
| Party | Candidate | Votes | % | ±% |
|---|---|---|---|---|
| BSP | Mohammad Iqbal | 54,941 | 29.2 | – |
| SP | Sharbaaz Khan | 39,928 | 21.22 | – |
| BJP | Kavita Singh | 36,941 | 19.63 | – |
| | Remainder 11 candidates | 56,355 | 29.94 | – |
| Majority | | 15,013 | 7.98 | – |
| Turnout | | 188,165 | 67.59 | – |
| BSP hold | | Swing | | |

== See also ==
- Bijnor Lok Sabha constituency
- Bijnor district
- Government of Uttar Pradesh
- List of Vidhan Sabha constituencies of Uttar Pradesh
- Sixteenth Legislative Assembly of Uttar Pradesh
- Uttar Pradesh Legislative Assembly
- Uttar Pradesh
