= Duddhi Assembly constituency =

Constituency of the Uttar Pradesh legislative assembly in India

Coordinates: 24.21°N 83.24°E

Duddhi
- Constituency No. 403 for the Uttar Pradesh Legislative Assembly

Constituency details
- Country: India
- Region: North India
- State: Uttar Pradesh
- District: Sonbhadra
- Reservation: ST

Member of Legislative Assembly
- 18th Uttar Pradesh Legislative Assembly
- Incumbent Vacant

Duddhi is a constituency of the Uttar Pradesh Legislative Assembly covering the city of Duddhi in the Sonbhadra district of Uttar Pradesh, India. Duddhi is one of five assembly constituencies in the Robertsganj Lok Sabha constituency and is reserved for candidates of the Schedule Tribes.

== Members of the Legislative Assembly ==
Year	Member	Party
1962	Ram Pyare	Indian National Congress
1967	Ayodhya Prasad	Bharatiya Jana Sangh
1969	Ram Pyare	Indian National Congress
1974	Shiv Sampat	Bharatiya Jana Sangh
1977	Ishwar Prasad	Janata Party
1980	Vijay Singh Gond	Indian National Congress (I)
1985	Vijay Singh Gond	Indian National Congress
1989	Vijay Singh Gond	Independent
1991	Vijay Singh Gond	Janata Dal
1993	Vijay Singh Gond	Janata Dal
1996	Vijay Singh Gond	Samajwadi Party
2002	Vijay Singh Gond	Samajwadi Party
2007	Chandra Mani Prasad	Bahujan Samaj Party
2012	Rubi Prasad	Independent
2017	Hariram	Apna Dal (Soneylal)
2022	Ramdular Gaur	Bharatiya Janata Party
2024^	Vijay Singh Gond	Samajwadi Party
2027		

^By election

== Election results ==
=== 2027 ===
2027 Uttar Pradesh Legislative Assembly election: Duddhu
Party	Candidate	Votes	%	±%
INDIA				
NDA				
BSP				
NOTA	None of the above			
Majority				
Turnout				
gain from		Swing		

=== 2024 bypoll ===
Uttar Pradesh Legislative Assembly by-election, 2024: Duddhi
Party	Candidate	Votes	%	±%
SP	Vijay Singh Gond	82,787	42.02	▲3.82
BJP	Saravan Kumar	79,579	40.39	▼0.89
BSP	Ravi Singh	22,395	11.37	▼0.31
NOTA	None of the Above	5,252	2.67	▲0.34
Majority		3,208	1.63	▼1.45
Turnout		1,97,019		
SP gain from BJP		Swing		

=== 2022 ===
2022 Uttar Pradesh Legislative Assembly election: Duddhi
Party	Candidate	Votes	%	±%
BJP	Ramdular Gaur	84,407	41.28	
SP	Vijay Singh Gond	78,110	38.2	
BSP	Hariram	23,879	11.68	−20.52
INC	Basanti Pani	4,533	2.22	−21.22
Independent	Ramlal	2,132	1.04	
Independent	Hriday Kumar	1,853	0.91	
NOTA	None of the above	4,756	2.33	−2.2
Majority		6,297	3.08	+2.52
Turnout		204,469	61.58	−2.24
BJP gain from AD(S)		Swing		

=== 2017 ===
Apna Dal (Sonelal) candidate Hariram won in 2017 Uttar Pradesh Legislative Elections defeating Bahujan Samaj Party candidate Vijay Singh Gond by a margin of 1,085 votes.

2017 Uttar Pradesh Legislative Assembly election: Duddhi
Party	Candidate	Votes	%	±%
AD(S)	Hariram	64,399	32.76	
BSP	Vijay Singh Gond	63,314	32.2	
INC	Anil Kumar Singh	46,090	23.44	
Independent	Pratosh Kumar	4,699	2.39	
RLD	Shivkumar Kharwar	3,312	1.68	
Communist Party of India (Marxist-Leninist)(Liberation)	Vigan Ram	2,431	1.24	
Bhartiya Rashtriya Jansatta	Amar Singh	2,147	1.09	
NOTA	None of the above	8,522	4.53	
Majority		1,085	0.56	
Turnout		196,600	63.82	
