= Milak Assembly constituency =

Constituency of the Uttar Pradesh legislative assembly in India

Milak
- Constituency No. 38 for the Uttar Pradesh Legislative Assembly

Constituency details
- Country: India
- Region: North India
- State: Uttar Pradesh
- District: Rampur
- Total electors: 381,258 (2022)
- Reservation: SC

Member of Legislative Assembly
- 18th Uttar Pradesh Legislative Assembly
- Incumbent Rajbala Singh
- Party: Bharatiya Janata Party
- Elected year: 2022

Milak is one of the 403 constituencies of the Uttar Pradesh Legislative Assembly, India. It is a part of the Rampur district and one of the five assembly constituencies in the Rampur Lok Sabha constituency. First election in this assembly constituency was held in 2012 after the "Delimitation of Parliamentary and Assembly Constituencies Order, 2008" was passed in the year 2008. The constituency is assigned identification number 38.

== Wards / Areas ==
Extent of Milak Assembly constituency is Shahabad Tehsil; PCs Ramnagar, Dhamora, Puraina, Ainchora, Larhpur, Lohapatti Bholanath, Bhainsori, Jalif Nagla, Vikrampur, Khutia, Dhanelipurbi, Param, Kripyapanday, Purainya Kalan of Milak KC & Milak MB of Milak Tehsil.

== Members of the Legislative Assembly ==
Year	Member	Party
Till 2012 : Constituency did not exist
2012	Vijay Singh	Samajwadi Party
2017	Rajbala Singh	Bharatiya Janata Party
2022	Rajbala Singh	Bharatiya Janata Party

== Election results ==
=== 2027 ===
2027 Uttar Pradesh Legislative Assembly election: Milak
Party	Candidate	Votes	%	±%
INDIA				
NDA				
BSP				
NOTA	None of the above			
Majority				
Turnout				
gain from		Swing		

=== 2022 ===
2022 Uttar Pradesh Legislative Assembly election: Milak
Party	Candidate	Votes	%	±%
BJP	Rajbala Singh	97,948	43.11	+1.57
SP	Vijay Singh	92,036	40.5	+6.67
BSP	Surendra Singh Sagar	31,492	13.86	−4.29
INC	Kumar Eklavya	2,836	1.25	
NOTA	None of the above	1,479	0.65	−0.04
Majority		5,912	2.61	−5.1
Turnout		227,230	63.57	−0.29
BJP hold		Swing		

=== 2017 ===
2017 Uttar Pradesh Legislative Assembly election: Milak
Party	Candidate	Votes	%	±%
BJP	Rajbala Singh	89,861	41.54	
SP	Vijay Singh	73,194	33.83	
BSP	Radhe Shyam	39,271	18.15	
Independent	Chandrapal Singh	7,914	3.66	
NOTA	None of the above	1,477	0.69	
Majority		16,667	7.71	
Turnout		216,334	63.86	
BJP gain from SP		Swing		

=== 2012 ===
2012 General Elections: Milak
Party	Candidate	Votes	%	±%
SP	Vijay Singh	56,798	31.54	−
INC	Chandrapal Singh	36,635	20.34	−
BSP	Radhey Shyam	34,964	19.41	−
	Remainder 13 candidates	51,691	28.7	−
Majority		20,163	11.2	−
Turnout		180,088	58.53	−
SP hold		Swing		

== See also ==
- Rampur district
- Rampur Lok Sabha constituency
- Sixteenth Legislative Assembly of Uttar Pradesh
- Uttar Pradesh Legislative Assembly
