= Ravendra Pal Singh (politician) =

Indian politician

Ravendra Pal Singh is an Indian politician who is serving as Member of 18th Uttar Pradesh Legislative Assembly from Chharra Assembly constituency. In 2022 Uttar Pradesh Legislative Assembly election, he won with 1,11,293 votes.
