= Hemlata Divakar =

Indian politician

Hemlata Diwakar

Mayor of the Agra Municipal Corporation
- Incumbent
- Assumed office 2023
- Preceded by: Naveen Jain

Member of Uttar Pradesh legislative assembly
- In office 2017–2022
- Preceded by: Kali Charan Suman
- Succeeded by: Baby Rani Maurya
- Constituency: Agra Rural

Personal details
- Party: Bhartiya Janata Party
- Other political affiliations: Samajwadi Party

Hemlata Divakar Kushwaha is an Indian politician from the Bharatiya Janata Party. Divakar was a Member of the Uttar Pradesh Legislative Assembly from Agra Rural Constituency in Agra district, from 2017 to 2022. She had contested UP Vidhan Sabha election in 2012 as a candidate of Samajwadi Party.
