= Agra Rural Assembly constituency =

Constituency of the Uttar Pradesh legislative assembly in India

Agra Rural
- Constituency No. 90 for the Uttar Pradesh Legislative Assembly

Constituency details
- Country: India
- Region: North India
- State: Uttar Pradesh
- District: Agra
- Total electors: 344,002 (2012)
- Reservation: SC

Member of Legislative Assembly
- 18th Uttar Pradesh Legislative Assembly
- Incumbent Baby Rani Maurya
- Party: Bharatiya Janata Party
- Elected year: 2022
- Preceded by: Hemlata Divakar

Agra Rural is one of the 403 constituencies of the Uttar Pradesh Legislative Assembly, India. It is a Jatav dominant seat and part of the Agra district and one of the five assembly constituencies in the Fatehpur Sikri Lok Sabha constituency. First assembly election in this assembly constituency was conducted in 2012 after the constituency came into existence in the year 2008 as a result of the "Delimitation of Parliamentary and Assembly Constituencies Order, 2008".

== Wards / Areas ==
Agra Rural Assembly constituency comprises the following Wards / areas.

#	Name	Reserved for	Comments
01	Akola	None	
02	Azizpur	None	
03	Baroliahir	None	
04	Bichpuri	None	
05	Dhanauli	None	
06	Nainana Jat	None	

== Members of the Legislative Assembly ==
Year	Member	Party
2012	Kali Charan Suman	Bahujan Samaj Party
2017	Hemlata Divakar	Bharatiya Janata Party
2022	Baby Rani Maurya	Bharatiya Janata Party

== Election results ==
=== 2027 ===
2027 Uttar Pradesh Legislative Assembly election: Agra Rural
Party	Candidate	Votes	%	±%
INDIA				
NDA				
BSP				
NOTA	None of the above			
Majority				
Turnout				
gain from		Swing		

=== 2022 ===
U. P. Legislative Assembly Election, 2022: Agra Rural
Party	Candidate	Votes	%	±%
BJP	Baby Rani Maurya	137,310	52.63	▲0.66
BSP	Kiran Prabha Kesari	60,702	23.26	▼2.58
RLD	Mahesh Kumar	52,731	20.21	▲13.23
INC	Upendra Singh	3,770	1.44	▼11.09
NOTA	None of the above	1,211	0.46	▼0.29
Majority		76,608	29.37	▲3.24
Turnout		260,921	60.98	▼2.7
BJP hold		Swing		

=== 2017 ===
U. P. Legislative Assembly Election, 2017: Agra Rural
Party	Candidate	Votes	%	±%
BJP	Hemlata Divakar	129,887	51.97	
BSP	Kali Charan Suman	64,591	25.84	
INC	Upendra Singh	31,312	12.53	
RLD	Narayan Singh Suman	17,446	6.98	
NOTA	None of the above	1,856	0.75	
Majority		65,296	26.13	
Turnout		249,926	63.68	
BJP gain from BSP		Swing		

=== 2012 ===
2012 General Elections: Agra Rural
Party	Candidate	Votes	%	±%
BSP	Kali Charan Suman	69,969	34.84	−
SP	Hemlata Divakar	51,123	25.46	−
INC	Upendra Singh	38,832	19.34	−
	Remainder eight candidates	40,879	20.36	−
Majority		18,846	9.39	−
Turnout		200,803	58.37	−
BSP hold		Swing	-	

== See also ==
- Agra district
- Agra Lok Sabha constituency
- Government of Uttar Pradesh
- List of Vidhan Sabha constituencies of Uttar Pradesh
- Uttar Pradesh
- Uttar Pradesh Legislative Assembly
