= Rajbala =

Indian politician

Rajbala Singh

Member of the Uttar Pradesh legislative assembly
- Incumbent
- Assumed office March 2017
- Preceded by: Vijay Singh
- Constituency: Milak, Rampur district

Personal details
- Party: Bharatiya Janata Party
- Occupation: MLA
- Profession: Politician

Rajbala Singh is an Indian politician and a member of 17th Legislative Assembly of Milak, Uttar Pradesh of India. She represents the Milak constituency of Uttar Pradesh. She is a member of the Bharatiya Janata Party.

== Political career ==
Rajbala is a member of the 17th Legislative Assembly of Uttar Pradesh. She is a member of the Bharatiya Janata Party and since 2017, has represented the Milak constituency. Raj Bala Malik is Chandigarh mayor from 10 January 2020 to 7 January 2021.

== Posts held ==
#	From	To	Position	Comments
1	2017	Incumbent	Member, 17th Legislative Assembly	

== See also ==
- Uttar Pradesh Legislative Assembly
