= Gajraj Singh =

Indian politician

Gajraj Singh गजराज सिंह

MLA, 16th Legislative Assembly
- In office Mar 2012 – Mar 2017
- Preceded by: Dharam Pal
- Constituency: Hapur

MLA, 12th Legislative Assembly
- In office Dec 1993 – Oct 1995
- Preceded by: Vijendra Kumar
- Succeeded by: Jay Prakash
- Constituency: Hapur

MLA, 10th Legislative Assembly
- In office Dec 1989 – Apr 1991
- Preceded by: Himself
- Succeeded by: Vijendra Kumar
- Constituency: Hapur

MLA, 09th Legislative Assembly
- In office Mar 1985 – Nov 1989
- Preceded by: Bhoop Singh Kain
- Succeeded by: Himself
- Constituency: Hapur

Personal details
- Born: 31 July 1953 (age 73) Hapur, Uttar Pradesh, India
- Party: Rashtriya Lok Dal
- Other political affiliations: Indian National Congress (till 2021)
- Spouse: Lajja Singh (wife)
- Children: 4 sons & 1 daughter
- Parent: Mamchand (father)
- Education: Hariharnath Shastri Smarak Inter College
- Profession: Farmer & politician

Gajraj Singh (Hindi: गजराज सिंह; born 31 July 1953) is an Indian politician who was a member of the 16th Legislative Assembly of Uttar Pradesh of India. In past, He has represented the Hapur constituency of Uttar Pradesh and is a member of the Rashtriya Lok Dal. He was a member of Indian National Congress political party until 2021. In 2017 assembly elections he lost to BJP Candidate.

== Early life and education ==
Gajraj Singh was born in Hapur. He attended the Hariharnath Shastri Smarak Inter College and is educated till tenth grade.

== Political career ==
Gajraj Singh has been a MLA for four terms. He represented the Hapur constituency during all his terms and is a member of the Indian National Congress political party. In 2017 assembly elections he lost to BJP Candidate. In 2022 he joined Rashtriya Lok Dal.

== Posts held ==
#	From	To	Position	Comments
01	1985	1989	Member, 09th Legislative Assembly	
02	1989	1991	Member, 10th Legislative Assembly	
03	1993	1995	Member, 12th Legislative Assembly	
04	2012	2017	Member, 16th Legislative Assembly	

== See also ==
- Hapur
- Sixteenth Legislative Assembly of Uttar Pradesh
- Uttar Pradesh Legislative Assembly
