= Kamlesh Saini =

Indian politician

MLA, 17th Legislative Assembly
- In office March 2017 – March 2022
- Preceded by: Iqbal
- Succeeded by: Swami Omvesh
- Constituency: Chandpur, Bijnor, Uttar Pradesh

Personal details
- Party: Bharatiya Janata Party
- Occupation: MLA
- Profession: Politician

Kamlesh Saini is an Indian politician and a member of 17th Legislative Assembly, Uttar Pradesh of India. He represents the ‘Chandpur’ constituency in Bijnor district of Uttar Pradesh.

== Political career ==
Kamlesh Saini contested Uttar Pradesh assembly election as Bharatiya Janata Party candidate and defeated his close contestant Mohammad Iqbal from Bahujan Samaj Party with a margin of 35,649 votes.

== Posts held ==
| # | From | To | Position | Comments |
|---|---|---|---|---|
| 01 | 2017 | Incumbent | Member, 17th Legislative Assembly | |
