= Swami Omvesh =

Indian politician

- Education: Jat Degree College Baraut, Meerut University

Swami Omvesh is an Indian politician from Samajwadi Party. He is elected to the Uttar Pradesh Legislative Assembly from Chandpur constituency of Uttar Pradesh in 2022 in Uttar Pradesh assembly election, and was also elected in the 1996 and 2002 Uttar Pradesh Legislative Assembly election as a member of the Rashtriya Lok Dal.
