= Mohammad Aleem Khan =

Indian politician (born 1963/64)

Honourable Haji Aleem हाजी अलीम (1964–2018)

MLA, Legislative Assembly of Uttar Pradesh
- In office March 2012 – March 2017
- Succeeded by: Virendra Singh Sirohi
- In office May 2007 – March 2012
- Preceded by: Mahendra Singh Yadav
- Constituency: Bulandshahr

Personal details
- Born: 1963 or 1964 Bulandshahr
- Died: 2018
- Party: Bahujan Samaj Party
- Spouse: Kamar Jahan (wife)
- Children: 4 sons
- Parent: Late Hafiz Abdul Rasheed (father)
- Education: Not attended school
- Profession: Businessman & politician

Mohammad Aleem Khan (Hindi: मोहम्मद अलीम खान) was an Indian politician and a member of the 16th Legislative Assembly of India. He represented the Bulandshahar constituency of Uttar Pradesh and was a member of the Bahujan Samaj Party political party.

== Early life and education ==
Mohd. Aleem Khan was born in Bulandshahar. He has not received any formal education and was literate.

== Political career ==
Aleem Khan had been a MLA for two terms. He represented the Bulandshahr constituency and was a member of the Bahujan Samaj Party political party.

He lost his seat in the 2017 Uttar Pradesh Assembly election to Virendra Singh of the Bharatiya Janata Party.

== Posts Held ==
#	From	To	Position	Comments
01	2012	2017	Member, 16th Legislative Assembly	
02	2007	2012	Member, 15th Legislative Assembly	

== See also ==
- Bulandshahr (Assembly constituency)
- Sixteenth Legislative Assembly of Uttar Pradesh
- Uttar Pradesh Legislative Assembly
