= Rakesh Kumar (politician) =

Indian politician

MLA, 16th Legislative Assembly of Uttar Pradesh
- In office March 2012 – March 2017
- Preceded by: Constituency Created
- Succeeded by: Ravendra Pal Singh
- Constituency: Chharra

Personal details
- Born: 5 June 1973 (age 53) Aligarh district
- Party: Samajwadi Party
- Spouse: Neetu Singh (wife)
- Children: 2 sons
- Parent: Rajpal Singh (father)
- Education: Shivaji University
- Profession: Farmer and politician

Rakesh Kumar is an Indian politician and a member of the 16th Legislative Assembly of India. He represents the Chharra constituency of Uttar Pradesh and is a member of the Samajwadi Party political party.

== Early life and education ==
Rakesh Kumar was born in Aligarh district. He attended the Shivaji University and attained Bachelor of Engineering degree.

== Political career ==
Rakesh Kumar has been a MLA for one term. He represented the Chharra constituency and is a member of the Samajwadi Party political party.

== Posts held ==
#	From	To	Position	Comments
01	March 2012	March 2017	Member, 16th Legislative Assembly	

== See also ==
- Chharra (Assembly constituency)
- Sixteenth Legislative Assembly of Uttar Pradesh
- Uttar Pradesh Legislative Assembly
