= Hapur Assembly constituency =

Constituency of the Uttar Pradesh legislative assembly in India

Hapur
- Constituency No. 59 for the Uttar Pradesh Legislative Assembly

Constituency details
- Country: India
- Region: North India
- State: Uttar Pradesh
- District: Hapur district
- Total electors: 296,679 (2012)
- Reservation: SC

Member of Legislative Assembly
- 18th Uttar Pradesh Legislative Assembly
- Incumbent Vijay Pal
- Party: Bharatiya Janata Party
- Elected year: 2017

Hapur is one of the 403 constituencies of the Uttar Pradesh Legislative Assembly, India. It is a part of the Hapur district and one of the five assembly constituencies in the Meerut Lok Sabha constituency. First election in this assembly constituency was held in 1957 after the "DPACO (1956)" (delimitation order) was passed in 1956. After the "Delimitation of Parliamentary and Assembly Constituencies Order, 2008" was passed in 2008, the constituency was assigned identification number 59. During the 02nd Vidhan Sabha (1957–1962), this constituency was represented by two MLAs simultaneously.

The constituency is reserved for candidates from scheduled caste community.

== Wards / Areas ==
Extent of Hapur Assembly constituency is PCs Hapur, Sadikpur, Kharkhari, Bhatiyana, Chamri, Harsinghpur, Gondi, Asaura, Peernagar Soodna, Tatarpur, Dadayara, Doyami, Sirodhan, Hafizpur Ubarpur, Baroda Sihani, Dahana, Malakpur of Hapur KC, PCs Hirdaypur, Simrauli, Meerpur Kalan, Kathikhera, Sikanderpur Kakori, Ayadnagar Janoob, Hosdarpur Garhi, Lukhrara, Bachhlota, Nali Husainpur, Chhapkauli of Babugarh KC, Babugarh NP & Hapur MB of Hapur Tehsil.

== Members of the Legislative Assembly ==
#	Term	Name	Party	From	To	Days	Comments	Ref
01	02nd Vidhan Sabha	Veer Sen	Indian National Congress	Apr-1957	Mar-1962	1,800	-	
02	02nd Vidhan Sabha	Lutf Ali Khan	Indian National Congress	Apr-1957	Mar-1962	1,800	-	
03	03rd Vidhan Sabha	Prem Sunder	Independent	Mar-1962	Mar-1967	1,828	-	
04	04th Vidhan Sabha	D. D. Sain	Republic Party Of India	Mar-1967	Apr-1968	402	-	
05	05th Vidhan Sabha	Lakshman Swaroop	Bharatiya Kranti Dal	Feb-1969	Mar-1974	1,832	-	
06	06th Vidhan Sabha	Bhoop Singh Kain	Indian National Congress	Mar-1974	Apr-1977	1,153	-	
07	07th Vidhan Sabha	Banarsi Das	Janata Party	Jun-1977	Feb-1980	969	-	
08	08th Vidhan Sabha	Bhoop Singh Kain	Indian National Congress (I)	Jun-1980	Mar-1985	1,735	-	
09	09th Vidhan Sabha	Gajraj Singh	Indian National Congress	Mar-1985	Nov-1989	1,725	-	
10	10th Vidhan Sabha	Gajraj Singh	Indian National Congress	Dec-1989	Apr-1991	488	-	
11	11th Vidhan Sabha	Vijendra Kumar	Bharatiya Janata Party	Jun-1991	Dec-1992	533	-	
12	12th Vidhan Sabha	Gajraj Singh	Indian National Congress	Dec-1993	Oct-1995	693	-	
13	13th Vidhan Sabha	Jay Prakash	Bharatiya Janata Party	Oct-1996	May-2002	1,967	-	
14	14th Vidhan Sabha	Dharam Pal	Bahujan Samaj Party	Feb-2002	May-2007	1,902	-	
15	15th Vidhan Sabha	Dharam Pal	Bahujan Samaj Party	May-2007	Mar-2012	1,762	-	
16	16th Vidhan Sabha	Gajraj Singh	Indian National Congress	Mar-2012	Mar-2017	-	-	
17	17th Vidhan Sabha	Vijay Pal	Bharatiya Janata Party	Mar-2017	Mar-2022			
18	18th Vidhan Sabha	Vijay Pal	Bharatiya Janata Party	Mar-2022	Incumbent			

== Election results ==
=== 2027 ===
2027 Uttar Pradesh Legislative Assembly election: Hapur
Party	Candidate	Votes	%	±%
INDIA				
NDA				
BSP	Vineet Kumar Diwan			
NOTA	None of the above			
Majority				
Turnout				
gain from		Swing		

=== 2022 ===
2022 Uttar Pradesh Legislative Assembly election: Hapur
Party	Candidate	Votes	%	±%
BJP	Vijay Pal	97,862	39.69	▲1.72
RLD	Gajraj Singh	90,828	36.84	▲34.45
BSP	Manish Singh	50,751	20.58	▼5.83
INC	Bhavna	3,195	1.3	▼29.93
NOTA	None of the above	930	0.38	▼0.05
Majority		7,034	2.85	▼3.89
Turnout		246,567	66.91	▲2.37
BJP hold		Swing		

=== 2017 ===
2017 General Elections: Hapur
Party	Candidate	Votes	%	±%
BJP	Vijay Pal	84,532	37.97	
INC	Gajraj Singh	69,526	31.23	
BSP	Shripal Singh	58,806	26.41	
RLD	Anju Urf Muskaan	5,317	2.39	
NOTA	None of the above	944	0.43	
Majority		15,006	6.74	
Turnout		222,655	64.54	
BJP gain from INC		Swing		

== See also ==
- Ghaziabad district, India
- Meerut Lok Sabha constituency
- Sixteenth Legislative Assembly of Uttar Pradesh
- Uttar Pradesh Legislative Assembly
