= Abhay Singh (politician) =

Indian politician

Member of Uttar Pradesh Legislative Assembly
- Incumbent
- Assumed office March 2022
- Preceded by: Indra Pratap Tiwari
- Constituency: Goshainganj
- In office May 2012 – March 2017
- Succeeded by: Indra Pratap Tiwari
- Constituency: Goshainganj

Personal details
- Born: 24 May 1974 (age 52)
- Party: Bharatiya Janata Party (2026-present)
- Other political affiliations: Samajwadi Party (till 2025)
- Spouse: Sarita Singh (m. 2001)
- Children: 3
- Education: Lucknow University, 1994
- Profession: Agriculture

Abhay Singh (born 24 May 1974) is an Indian politician and a member of the 18th Legislative Assembly of Uttar Pradesh representing Goshainganj. Elected as a Samajwadi Party candidate, he had also represented Goshainganj in the 16th Legislative Assembly of Uttar Pradesh. Singh was expelled from Samajwadi Party in June 2025 for working against party principles and supporting the Bharatiya Janata Party (BJP) in the February 2024 Rajya Sabha elections. In October 2026, Singh formally joined the BJP.

== Personal life ==
Singh was born to Bhagwan Bux Singh in Jaunpur, Uttar Pradesh on 24 May 1974. He completed his graduation from Lucknow University in 1994. He married Sarita Singh on 30 November 2001, with whom he has two daughters and a son. Hailing from Ayodhya city, Singh is an agriculturalist by profession.

== Political career ==
Active in the politics of Goshainganj, Singh as a Samajwadi Party candidate defeated Bahujan Samaj Party's Indra Pratap Tiwari in the 2012 Uttar Pradesh Legislative Assembly election, but lost to the latter in 2017, who had joined Bharatiya Janata Party prior to the election.

In the 2022 Uttar Pradesh Legislative Assembly election, Singh again representing Samajwadi Party from Goshainganj, defeated Bharatiya Janata Party's Aarti Tiwari, wife of incarcerated incumbent MLA Indra Pratap Tiwari, by a margin of 13,079 votes.

On 23 June 2025, Singh was expelled from Samajwadi Party, along with two other members, for working against party principles and voting in favour of the rival BJP in the February 2024 Rajya Sabha elections. The party, however, did not cancel their assembly memberships, rendering them as "unaffiliated MLAs".

On Oct 14, 2026, Singh, along with two other rebel MLAs, joined the Bharatiya Janata Party.
