= Usha Sirohi =

Indian politician

Usha Singh Sirohi

Member of the Uttar Pradesh Legislative Assembly
- In office Nov 2020 – March 2022
- Preceded by: Virendra Singh Sirohi
- Succeeded by: Pradeep Kumar Chaudhary
- Constituency: Bulandshahr

Personal details
- Born: 1 January 1952 (age 74) Baghpat, Uttar Pradesh
- Party: Bharatiya Janata Party
- Spouse: Virendra Singh Sirohi

Usha Singh Sirohi (born 1 January 1952) is an Indian politician from Bharatiya Janata Party who served as Member of 17th Uttar Pradesh Assembly (March 2017–March 2022) from Bulandshahr Assembly constituency. She is the widow of Virendra Singh Sirohi. She married him on 7 June 1971. In 2020 by-poll election, she received 86,879 votes and defeated Mohammad Yunus, with a margin of 21,702 votes.
