= Mathura Prasad Pal =

Indian politician

MLA, 17th Legislative Assembly
- In office 11 March 2017 – 22 July 2017
- Preceded by: Indra Pal Singh
- Succeeded by: Ajit Singh Pal
- Constituency: Sikandra

Personal details
- Born: 3 January 1946 Taharpur Maidu, Kanpur (Uttar Pradesh)
- Died: 22 July 2017 (aged 71) Mathura (Uttar Pradesh)
- Party: Bharatiya Janata Party
- Spouse: Sewarati Pal (1964–2017)
- Parent: Lallu Lal Pal
- Education: Intermediate
- Occupation: MLA
- Profession: Farmer, politician

Mathura Prasad Pal (3 January 1946 – 22 July 2017) was an Indian politician and a member of Uttar Pradesh Legislative Assembly. He represented the Sikandra assembly constituency of Kanpur Dehat district.

== Political career ==
He was elected for the first time in 1991 from Sarvankhera assembly constituency of Kanpur Dehat district as the Janata Dal candidate and a second time in 1996 as the Bharatiya Janata Party candidate. In the 2017 Uttar Pradesh Assembly Election, Pal defeated his close contestant Mahendra Katiyar of the Bahujan Samaj Party with a margin of 38,103 votes and became a member of the Uttar Pradesh Legislative Assembly for the third time.

Pal died on 22 July 2017 of cancer.

== Posts held ==
#	From	To	Position	Comments
01	2017	Incumbent	Member, 17th Legislative Assembly	
