= Vijay Singh Gond =

Indian politician (1957–2026)

Member of the Uttar Pradesh Legislative Assembly
- In office 4 June 2024 – 8 January 2026
- Preceded by: Ramdular Gaur
- Constituency: Duddhi
- In office 1980–2007
- Preceded by: Ishwar Prasad
- Succeeded by: Chandra Mani Prasad
- Constituency: Duddhi

Personal details
- Born: 10 March 1957 Farrukhabad, Uttar Pradesh, India
- Died: 8 January 2026 (aged 68) Lucknow, Uttar Pradesh, India
- Party: Samajwadi Party
- Other political affiliations: Indian National Congress
- Spouse: Damyanti Singh
- Children: 2
- Profession: Politician

Vijay Singh Gond (10 March 1957 – 8 January 2026) was an Indian politician. He served as Member of Uttar Pradesh Legislative Assembly from Duddhi. He served as State Minister in Mulayam Singh Yadav Government. He was elected to the Uttar Pradesh Legislative Assembly for eight terms beginning in 1980. He was a member of the Samajwadi Party.

== Early life ==
Vijay Singh Gond was born in Farrukhabad of Uttar Pradesh on 10 March 1957, to a Hindu family.

== Political career ==
In 1980, he was elected to the Uttar Pradesh Assembly for first time as a member of the Indian National Congress and then again in 1985 he won the Assembly elections. In 1989 he contested the assembly elections Independently and secured his seat for a third term. In 1991 and 1993 he won the Assembly elections as a member of Janata Dal. Later he joined the Samajwadi Party and won successive elections in 1996, 2002 from Duddhi. He won the 2007 Assembly elections from Farrukhabad and 2012 Assembly elections from Milak constituency as a member of the Samajwadi Party.

== Death ==
Singh Gond died on 8 January 2026, at the age of 68, after a long struggle with kidney failure.
