= Kali Charan Suman =

Indian politician

Kali Charan Suman काली चरण सुमन

MLA, 16th Legislative Assembly
- In office Mar 2012 – Mar 2017
- Preceded by: None
- Constituency: Agra Rural

Personal details
- Born: 5 July 1964 (age 61) Dholpur district, Rajasthan
- Citizenship: India
- Party: Bhartiya Janata Party
- Spouse: Ishwari Devi (Wife)
- Parent: Neksia Ram (Father)
- Profession: Teacher & Politician

Kali Charan Suman is an Indian politician and member of the 16th Uttar Pradesh Assembly. Suman is a member of the Bahujan Samaj Party and represented Agra Rural constituency of Uttar Pradesh.

== Early life and education ==
Kali Charan Suman was born in the village Ajitapura, Dholpur district, Rajasthan in 1964. Suman belongs to the SC category. He holds M.A. in Sanskrit and B.Ed. degrees (alma mater not known).

== Political career ==
Kali Charan Suman has been a MLA for one term (incumbent). He represents Agra Rural (Assembly constituency) and is a member of the Bahujan Samaj Party.

== Posts Held ==
#	From	To	Position	Comments
01	2012	Incumbent	Member, 16th Legislative Assembly	

== See also ==
- Agra Rural
- Uttar Pradesh Legislative Assembly
- 16th Legislative Assembly of Uttar Pradesh
- Politics of India
- Bahujan Samaj Party
