= 1957 Uttar Pradesh Legislative Assembly election =

Second Legislative Aseembly, Uttar Pradesh
| ← 1951 | February 25, 1957 | 1962 → |

430 seats in the Uttar Pradesh Legislative Assembly 216 seats needed for a majority
- Turnout: 44.77% ▲6.76%
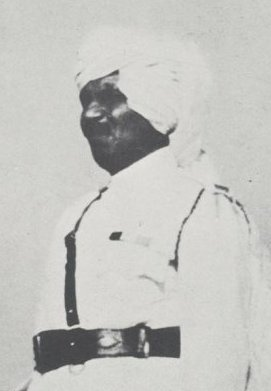
| | Majority party | Minority party |
|---|---|---|
| | | PSP |
| Leader | Sampurnanand | Triloki Singh |
| Party | INC | PSP |
| Leader's seat | Varanasi City South | Lucknow City East |
| Last election | 388 seats, 47.93% | 21 seats, 17.73% |
| Seats won | 286 | 44 |
| Seat change | ▼102 | ▲23 |
| Popular vote | 9,298,382 | 3,170,865 |
| Percentage | 42.42% | 14.47% |
| Swing | ▼5.51% | ▼3.26% |
CM before election
Sampurnanand
INC
Elected CM
Sampurnanand
INC

The second Legislative Assembly elections were held in Uttar Pradesh in 1957. The Indian National Congress won a comfortable margin with 286 of the 430 Vidhan Sabha seats, although it was less of a majority than in the previous election in 1951.

The Elections to the Uttar Pradesh Legislative Assembly were held on 25 February 1957. 1711 candidates contested for the 430 constituencies in the Assembly. There were 89 two-member constituencies and 252 single-member constituencies.

== Important members ==
Sampurnanand was the second Chief Minister of Uttar Pradesh. He succeeded Govind Ballabh Pant of his party and served as a Chief Minister from 1954 to 1960. In 1960, due to a political crisis initiated by Kamlapati Tripathi and Chandra Bhanu Gupta, Sampurnanand was asked to quit the post of Chief Minister and was sent to Rajasthan as the Governor. Chandra Bhanu Gupta ably assisted by his colleague Nirmal Chandra Chaturvedi, MLC was able to convince senior party leaders like Nehru, Pant and Kidwai that shifting of Sampurnanand was the need of the hour.

Pandit Dev Narayan ‘Bhartiya’, the First Revolutionist of the North India, from the Constituency, Jamaur Shahjahanpur(U.P.) was the Member of the Second Legislative Assembly (U.P.) from 1957 to 1962 and raised the most questions in the Assembly's Proceedings. Another fact about him is that he did not let any Congress Candidate win nearby his constituency, thus four seats (Jamaur, Tilhar, Khera Bajehra, Jalalabad) were secured by Ram Manohar Lohia's Socialist Party, under the guidance of Pandit Dev Narayan 'Bhartiya'. Following were also the important members of the Second Legislative Assembly of Uttar Pradesh.

| # | From | To | Position | Name | Party |
|---|---|---|---|---|---|
| 01 | 1957 | 1960 | Chief Minister | Sampurnanand | Indian National Congress |
| 02 | 1960 | 1962 | Chief Minister | Chandra Bhanu Gupta | Indian National Congress |
| 03 | 1957 | 1962 | Speaker of the Assembly | Atmaram Govind Kher | Indian National Congress |
| 04 | 1957 | 1962 | Deputy Speaker | Ramnarayan Tripathi | Indian National Congress |
| 05 | 1957 | 1962 | Leader of the Opposition | Triloki Singh | Praja Socialist Party |
| 06 | 1953 | 1959 | Finance minister | Hafiz Mohamad Ibrahim | Indian National Congress |
| 07 | 1959 | 1961 | Finance minister | Syed Ali Zaheer | Indian National Congress |
| 08 | 1961 | 1963 | Finance minister | Har Govind Singh | Indian National Congress |
| 09 | 1957 | 1960 | Minister of Parliamentary Affairs | S. Ali Zaheer | Indian National Congress |
| 10 | 1961 | 1962 | Minister of Parliamentary Affairs | Mangala Prasad | Indian National Congress |
| 11 | 1957 | 1962 | Principal Secretary | D. N. Mithal | - |

== Results ==
| Party | Votes | % | +/– | Seats | +/– |
|---|---|---|---|---|---|
| Indian National Congress | 9,298,382 | 42.42 | ▼5.51% | 286 | ▼102 |
| Praja Socialist Party | 3,170,865 | 14.47 | ▼3.26% | 44 | ▲23 |
| Bharatiya Jana Sangh | 2,157,881 | 9.84 | ▲3.39% | 17 | ▲15 |
| Communist Party of India | 840,348 | 3.83 | ▲3.49% | 9 | ▲8 |
| Akhil Bharatiya Ram Rajya Parishad | 165,671 | 0.76 | ▼0.98% | 0 | ▼1 |
| Independents | 6,285,457 | 28.68 | ▲9.02% | 74 | ▲59 |
| Total | 21,918,604 | 100.00 | – | 430 | Steady |

== Elected members ==
| ID | Assembly constituency | Winner | Party | Votes | Runner up | Party | Votes |
|---|---|---|---|---|---|---|---|
| 01 | Pithoragarh (SC) | Khushi Ram | Indian National Congress | 11,931 | Durga Datt | Praja Socialist Party | 9,042 |
| 01 | Pithoragarh (SC) | Narendra Singh Bisht | Indian National Congress | 14,984 | Jayant Lal | Praja Socialist Party | 8,835 |
| 02 | Almora | Govind Singh | Bharatiya Jana Sangh | 13,930 | Govardhan | Indian National Congress | 12,918 |
| 03 | Danpur | Mohan Singh | Indian National Congress | 9,043 | Jagannath | Praja Socialist Party | 5,982 |
| 04 | Ranikhet North | Hari Datt | Indian National Congress | 11,650 | Madan Mohan | Praja Socialist Party | 8,619 |
| 05 | Ranikhet South | Jang Bahadur | Indian National Congress | 10,158 | Govind Singh | Praja Socialist Party | 7,606 |
| 06 | Badrinath | Ghansyam | Independent politician | 16,365 | Shridhar Azad | Indian National Congress | 6,546 |
| 07 | Kedarnath | Narendra Singh | Indian National Congress | 13,083 | Gangadhar | Independent politician | 10,900 |
| 08 | Pauri | Chandar Singh | Indian National Congress | 11,020 | Shridharanand | Independent politician | 5,300 |
| 09 | Lansdowne | Ram Prasad | Indian National Congress | 12,824 | Padma Datt | Independent politician | 10,854 |
| 10 | Ganga Salan | Jagmohan Singh | Indian National Congress | 11,818 | Pratap Singh | Independent politician | 8,051 |
| 11 | Devprayag | Vinay Lakshmi | Indian National Congress | Uncontested | | | |
| 12 | Tehri | Surat Chand | Indian National Congress | Uncontested | | | |
| 13 | Rawain | Jayendra Singh | Indian National Congress | Uncontested | | | |
| 14 | Mussoorie | Gulab Singh | Independent politician | 21,074 | Surat Singh | Indian National Congress | 17,537 |
| 15 | Dehradun | Brij Bhushan Saran | Indian National Congress | 13,793 | Durga Prasad | Independent politician | 9,218 |
| 16 | Haridwar | Shanti Prapanna Sharma | Indian National Congress | 21,491 | Sumer Chand | Independent politician | 7,093 |
| 17 | Jwalapur | Said Ahmed | Indian National Congress | 30,576 | Nathu Ram | Bharatiya Jana Sangh | 14,353 |
| 18 | Roorkee | Din Dayal Shastri | Indian National Congress | 24,326 | Baru Mal | Independent politician | 12,093 |
| 19 | Deoband (SC) | Yashpal Singh | Independent politician | 57,185 | Thakur Phool Singh | Indian National Congress | 38,021 |
| 19 | Deoband (SC) | Har Deva | Indian National Congress | 41,104 | Sangat Singh | Independent politician | 27,487 |
| 20 | Saharanpur | Manzurul Nabi | Indian National Congress | 17,278 | Brahma Datt Mayor | Independent politician | 11,462 |
| 21 | Muzaffarabad | Mahmud Ali Khan | Indian National Congress | 19,034 | Jugul Kishore | Independent politician | 8,239 |
| 22 | Harora (SC) | Jai Gopal | Indian National Congress | 27,808 | Abdulla | Independent politician | 22,399 |
| 22 | Harora (SC) | Shakuntala Devi | Indian National Congress | 26,465 | Om Prakash | Independent politician | 18,440 |
| 23 | Nakur | Chaudhary Data Ram | Indian National Congress | 24,518 | Qazi Masood | Independent politician | 17,473 |
| 24 | Bhawan | Ghayur Ali Khan | Praja Socialist Party | 25,933 | Keshav Gupta | Indian National Congress | 25,258 |
| 25 | Kairana | Virendra Verma | Indian National Congress | 24,174 | Sultan Singh | Praja Socialist Party | 22,733 |
| 26 | Muzaffarnagar | Dwarka Prasad | Indian National Congress | 25,251 | Prem Sukh | Praja Socialist Party | 8,354 |
| 27 | Jansath (SC) | Ram Das | Indian National Congress | 38,816 | Ashok Krishna Kant | Communist Party of India | 11,279 |
| 27 | Jansath (SC) | Ahmed Bakhsh | Indian National Congress | 37,356 | Said Murtaza | Independent politician | 27,443 |
| 28 | Shikarpur (SC) | Badam Singh | Indian National Congress | 38,771 | Raghubir Singh | Bharatiya Jana Sangh | 12,587 |
| 28 | Shikarpur (SC) | Rajendra Datt | Indian National Congress | 36,516 | Deen Mohammad | Independent politician | 17,386 |
| 29 | Budhana | Kunwar Asghar Ali | Independent politician | 32,725 | Shri Chand | Indian National Congress | 28,425 |
| 30 | Sardhana (SC) | Ramji Lal Sahayak | Indian National Congress | 49,889 | Manphool | Bharatiya Jana Sangh | 18,170 |
| 30 | Sardhana (SC) | Faten Singh Rana | Indian National Congress | 51,992 | Shiam Singh | Independent politician | 40,212 |
| 31 | Kotana | Charan Singh | Indian National Congress | 27,075 | Vijaipal Singh | Independent politician | 26,451 |
| 32 | Baraut | Acharya Dipankar | Independent politician | 21,107 | Harkhayal Singh | Indian National Congress | 18,490 |
| 33 | Baghpat | Raghubir Singh | Indian National Congress | 22,145 | Bharat Singh | Communist Party of India | 10,110 |
| 34 | Ghaziabad | Teja Singh | Indian National Congress | 17,505 | P. Chandra | Bharatiya Jana Sangh | 9,614 |
| 35 | Dasna | Kr. Mahmood Ali Khan | Indian National Congress | 26,845 | Baljit Singh | Independent politician | 26,761 |
| 36 | Modinagar | Cichitra Narayan Sharma | Indian National Congress | 34,733 | Hukam Singh | Praja Socialist Party | 10,689 |
| 37 | Hapur (SC) | Veer Sen | Indian National Congress | 55,309 | Parmatma Sharan | Bharatiya Jana Sangh | 19,845 |
| 37 | Hapur (SC) | Lutf Ali Khan | Indian National Congress | 59,737 | Parmanand | Independent politician | 31,326 |
| 38 | Hastinapur | Bishember Singh | Indian National Congress | 25,245 | Pitam Singh | Communist Party of India | 10,365 |
| 39 | Meerut Cantonment | Prakashwati Sud | Indian National Congress | 24,360 | Shanti Swaroop | Communist Party of India | 12,976 |
| 40 | Kithore | Shradha Devi | Indian National Congress | 64,142 | Devi Dayal | Independent politician | 20,721 |
| 40 | Kithore | Hari Singh | Indian National Congress | 57,518 | Beshember Datta | Independent politician | 14,199 |
| 41 | Meerut City | Kailash Prakash | Indian National Congress | 27,059 | Aizaz Husain | Independent politician | 18,604 |
| 42 | Dadri | Satyawati | Indian National Congress | 19,144 | Mahraj Singh | Independent politician | 10,394 |
| 43 | Sikandrabad | Ram Chander Vikal | Indian National Congress | 27,427 | Ali Hadi | Praja Socialist Party | 8,387 |
| 44 | Bulandshahr | Raghuraj Singh | Praja Socialist Party | 32,870 | Banarasi Dass | Indian National Congress | 19,105 |
| 45 | Khurja (SC) | Gopali | Independent politician | 30,228 | Kewal Singh | Indian National Congress | 28,556 |
| 45 | Khurja (SC) | Chattar Singh | Independent politician | 30,839 | Bhim Sen | Indian National Congress | 28,548 |
| 46 | Debai | Himmat Singh | Bharatiya Jana Sangh | 20,413 | Chunni Lal | Indian National Congress | 16,755 |
| 47 | Anupshahr (SC) | Dharam Singh | Indian National Congress | 35,215 | Beni Prasad | Praja Socialist Party | 31,347 |
| 47 | Anupshahr (SC) | Din Dayal | Indian National Congress | 37,236 | Kehar Singh | Praja Socialist Party | 31,134 |
| 48 | Siana | Irtaza Husain | Indian National Congress | 20,046 | Har Pal | Praja Socialist Party | 17,207 |
| 49 | Agota | Jagbir Singh | Praja Socialist Party | 21,797 | Mohan Singh | Indian National Congress | 21,432 |
| 50 | Najibabad | Hafiz Mohd. Ibrahim | Indian National Congress | 32,321 | Naipal Singh | Bharatiya Jana Sangh | 19,312 |
| 51 | Afzalgarh | Allah Bux | Independent politician | 17,178 | Ratan Lal | Indian National Congress | 10,795 |
| 52 | Bijnor | Chandrawati | Indian National Congress | 21,771 | Chandan Singh | Communist Party of India | 19,281 |
| 53 | Chandpur | Nardeo Singh | Independent politician | 20,624 | Shive Kumar | Indian National Congress | 20,262 |
| 54 | Nagina | Govind Sahai | Indian National Congress | 27,266 | Thamman Singh | Bharatiya Jana Sangh | 15,056 |
| 55 | Dhampur (SC) | Khub Singh | Indian National Congress | 40,123 | Hari Pal Singh | Bharatiya Jana Sangh | 22,842 |
| 55 | Dhampur (SC) | Girdhari Lal | Indian National Congress | 41,106 | Sant Ram | Bharatiya Jana Sangh | 24,873 |
| 56 | Hasanpur (SC) | Sukhan Lal | Indian National Congress | 23,921 | Tika Ram | Praja Socialist Party | 18,855 |
| 56 | Hasanpur (SC) | Jagdish Prasad | Indian National Congress | 26,193 | Prabhu Singh | Independent politician | 22,550 |
| 57 | Bahjoi | Badhi Singh | Praja Socialist Party | 14,896 | Jagdish Saran Rastogi | Indian National Congress | 13,606 |
| 58 | Sambhal | Mahmood Husain Khan | Independent politician | 22,351 | Zarif Husain | Indian National Congress | 14,570 |
| 59 | Amroha | Ram Kumar | Independent politician | 20,843 | Latafat Husain | Indian National Congress | 18,538 |
| 60 | Kanth | Jitendra Pratap Singh | Indian National Congress | Uncontested | | | |
| 61 | Thakurdwara | Kishan Singh | Indian National Congress | 22,932 | Harvansh Singh | Praja Socialist Party | 11,304 |
| 62 | Moradabad City | Halimuddin | Independent politician | 23,212 | Wali Ahmad Khan | Indian National Congress | 12,862 |
| 63 | Moradabad Rural | Khamani Singh | Independent politician | 13,467 | Dau Dayal Khanna | Indian National Congress | 13,271 |
| 64 | Bilari (SC) | Jagdish Narain | Indian National Congress | 22,468 | Akhtar Hussain | Independent politician | 17,308 |
| 64 | Bilari (SC) | Mahi Lal | Indian National Congress | 21,931 | Om Prakash Sharma | Independent politician | 17,185 |
| 65 | Rampur | Aslam Khan | Independent politician | 17,241 | Fazal Haq Khan | Indian National Congress | 12,415 |
| 66 | Shahabad (SC) | Baldeo Singh Arya | Indian National Congress | 33,265 | Sohan Lal | Praja Socialist Party | 21,956 |
| 66 | Shahabad (SC) | Kalyan Rai | Indian National Congress | 39,293 | Ram Kishan | Praja Socialist Party | 27,362 |
| 67 | Suar Tanda | Mahmood Ali Khan | Indian National Congress | 24,564 | Akhtar Ali Khan | Independent politician | 16,876 |
| 68 | Baheri | Ram Murti | Indian National Congress | 18,843 | Cheda Lal | Independent politician | 16,781 |
| 69 | Sirauli | Vaidya Dharam Datt | Indian National Congress | 18,936 | Bhawan Sahai | Praja Socialist Party | 13,683 |
| 70 | Aonla | Nawal Kishore | Indian National Congress | 17,834 | Brij Mohan Lal | Praja Socialist Party | 14,389 |
| 71 | Faridpur (SC) | Sunder Lal | Indian National Congress | 17,764 | Pemi | Bharatiya Jana Sangh | 9,515 |
| 71 | Faridpur (SC) | Nathu Singh | Indian National Congress | 20,583 | Brij Raj Singh | Independent politician | 16,046 |
| 72 | Bareilly City | Jagdish Saran Agarwal | Indian National Congress | 18,560 | Ram Ballabh | Bharatiya Jana Sangh | 11,120 |
| 73 | Bareilly Cantonment | Mohammad Hussain | Indian National Congress | 12,646 | Krishna Murai Lal Asar | Praja Socialist Party | 9,106 |
| 74 | Bhojipura | Baboo Ram | Indian National Congress | 14,659 | Jai Dev | Praja Socialist Party | 13,200 |
| 75 | Nawabganj | Sheo Raj Bahadur | Praja Socialist Party | 15,192 | Naurang Lal | Indian National Congress | 14,382 |
| 76 | Nainital | Narain Datt Tewari | Praja Socialist Party | 15,730 | Shyam Lal Varma | Indian National Congress | 14,176 |
| 77 | Kashipur | Lakshman Datt | Indian National Congress | 22,843 | Ram Datt | Praja Socialist Party | 14,311 |
| 78 | Tanakpur | Pratap Singh | Praja Socialist Party | 9,948 | Maqsood Alam Khan | Indian National Congress | 9,435 |
| 79 | Pilibhit | Niranjan Singh | Indian National Congress | 9,664 | Ram Kirshna Sahu | Bharatiya Jana Sangh | 6,865 |
| 80 | Bisalpur (SC) | Behari Lal | Praja Socialist Party | 25,196 | Gomti Devi | Indian National Congress | 17,246 |
| 80 | Bisalpur (SC) | Munendrapal Singh | Praja Socialist Party | 28,724 | Nanhoo Mal Gangwar | Indian National Congress | 16,040 |
| 81 | Powayan (SC) | Kamle | Independent politician | 20,472 | Govind | Indian National Congress | 15,636 |
| 81 | Powayan (SC) | Rajkumar Surendra Singh | Independent politician | 45,365 | Rama Dhar | Independent politician | 18,831 |
| 82 | Shahjahanpur | Ashfaq Ali | Independent politician | 11,021 | Darshan Singh | Independent politician | 10,744 |
| 83 | Jamuar | Dev Narain Bharti | Independent politician | 8,160 | Ram Bilas Singh | Independent politician | 8,063 |
| 84 | Tilhar | Balak Ram | Independent politician | 9,914 | Damodar Dass | Indian National Congress | 8,276 |
| 85 | Khera Bajehra | Room Singh | Independent politician | 10,117 | Surendra Vikram Singh | Indian National Congress | 9,922 |
| 86 | Jalalabad | Har Chandra Singh | Independent politician | 10,772 | Bhagwan Saran | Independent politician | 9,690 |
| 87 | Dataganj | Harish Chandra Singh | Indian National Congress | 19,217 | Onkar Singh | Bharatiya Jana Sangh | 15,587 |
| 88 | Usehat | Moharik Ali Khan | Independent politician | 9,382 | Nirottam Singh | Bharatiya Jana Sangh | 7,791 |
| 89 | Badaun | Tika Ram | Independent politician | 22,286 | Asrar Ahmad | Indian National Congress | 20,833 |
| 90 | Ujhani | Sri Krishan Goyal | Indian National Congress | 24,779 | Nirottam Singh | Communist Party of India | 4,989 |
| 91 | Sahaswan | Ulfat Singh | Independent politician | 9,885 | Mushtaq Ali | Indian National Congress | 9,304 |
| 92 | Bisauli (SC) | Kesho Ram | Indian National Congress | 26,980 | Ratan Singh | Praja Socialist Party | 18,295 |
| 92 | Bisauli (SC) | Shiv Raj Singh | Indian National Congress | 31,704 | Shiam Singh | Praja Socialist Party | 23,233 |
| 93 | Islamnagar | Kailash Kumar Singh | Indian National Congress | 12,682 | Suraj Pal Singh | Praja Socialist Party | 11,002 |
| 94 | Gunnaur | Jamuna Singh | Praja Socialist Party | 14,361 | Karan Singh | Indian National Congress | 11,007 |
| 95 | Tappal | Deo Datta | Indian National Congress | 24,080 | Mahabir Singh | Independent politician | 10,730 |
| 96 | Aligarh | Anant Ram Varma | Indian National Congress | 20,655 | L. N. Mathur | Independent politician | 7,270 |
| 97 | Koil (SC) | Mohan Lal Gautam | Indian National Congress | 36,472 | Bhagwati Psasad Mauriya | Independent politician | 32,820 |
| 97 | Koil (SC) | Ram Prasad Deshmukh | Indian National Congress | 35,869 | Chetanya Raj Singh | Independent politician | 32,297 |
| 98 | Atrauli | Nek Ram Sharma | Indian National Congress | 30,168 | Babu Singh | Independent politician | 24,168 |
| 99 | Gangiri | Sri Niwas | Indian National Congress | 29,918 | Shyam Sunde | Independent politician | 13,774 |
| 100 | Sikandra Rao | Malkhan Singh | Indian National Congress | 18,707 | Omkar | Bharatiya Jana Sangh | 13,450 |
| 101 | Hathras (SC) | Nand Kumar Deo | Indian National Congress | 37,072 | Gajadhar Singh | Bharatiya Jana Sangh | 13,999 |
| 101 | Hathras (SC) | Har Dayal Singh | Indian National Congress | 31,094 | Baldev | Communist Party of India | 24,051 |
| 102 | Iglas | Kishori Raman Singh | Independent politician | 19,856 | Lakshmi Singh | Independent politician | 14,542 |
| 103 | Mathura | Sri Nath | Indian National Congress | 25,923 | Lakshman Prasad | Bharatiya Jana Sangh | 17,008 |
| 104 | Goverdhan | Jugal Kishore | Indian National Congress | 21,218 | Kishun Lal | Praja Socialist Party | 12,715 |
| 105 | Chhata | Ramhet Singh | Indian National Congress | 23,151 | Tikam Singh | Independent politician | 17,581 |
| 106 | Mat (SC) | Acharya Laxmi Raman | Indian National Congress | 41,951 | Ganga Prasad | Praja Socialist Party | 17,798 |
| 106 | Mat (SC) | Shyam Lal | Indian National Congress | 27,443 | Radhey Shyam | Praja Socialist Party | 15,574 |
| 107 | Sadabad | Tika Ram | Independent politician | 22,364 | Ashraf Ali Khan | Indian National Congress | 17,967 |
| 108 | Fatehpur Sikri | Swami Visheshwaranand | Praja Socialist Party | 23,832 | Champawati | Indian National Congress | 14,599 |
| 109 | Khairagarh | Sri Krishna Dutt Paliwal | Independent politician | 19,411 | Jagan Prasad Rawat | Indian National Congress | 13,754 |
| 110 | Agra City I | Adi Ram Singhal | Indian National Congress | 27,561 | Baliji Bal Krishna | Bharatiya Jana Sangh | 14,148 |
| 111 | Agra City II | Chhatrapati Ambesh | Indian National Congress | 46,595 | Raj Nath Kunzru | Independent politician | 39,113 |
| 111 | Agra City II | Deoki Nandan Vibhav | Indian National Congress | 44,373 | Mithan Lal | Independent politician | 32,660 |
| 112 | Etmadpur | Ganga Dhar | Indian National Congress | 22,121 | Krishna Pal Singh | Independent politician | 14,292 |
| 112 | Etmadpur | Ram Singh | Independent politician | 27,366 | Krishna Pal Singh | Independent politician | 14,292 |
| 113 | Firozabad | Jagan Nath Lahri | Independent politician | 16,498 | Haidar Bux | Indian National Congress | 11,909 |
| 114 | Fatehabad | Laxmi Narain Bansal | Indian National Congress | 11,529 | Hukam Singh | Independent politician | 9,408 |
| 115 | Bah | Mahendra Ripudaman Singh | Independent politician | 34,721 | Shambhu Nath Chaturvedi | Indian National Congress | 12,439 |
| 116 | Jalesar | Chiranji Lal | Indian National Congress | 21,748 | Tursanpal Singh | Bharatiya Jana Sangh | 16,251 |
| 116 | Jalesar | Raghubir Singh | Praja Socialist Party | 26,504 | Tursanpal Singh | Bharatiya Jana Sangh | 16,251 |
| 117 | Kasganj | Kali Charan | Indian National Congress | 15,713 | Himmat Singh | Praja Socialist Party | 12,416 |
| 118 | Sahawar | Tirmal Singh | Indian National Congress | 16,537 | Ram Chandra Singh | Independent politician | 7,800 |
| 119 | Nidhpur | Shamshul Islam | Indian National Congress | 12,958 | Vikramaditya Singh | Independent politician | 10,811 |
| 120 | Aliganj | Bhup Kishore | Independent politician | 10,011 | Mahabir Singh Karunesh | Indian National Congress | 9,047 |
| 121 | Sirhpura | Chhotey Lal Paliwal | Indian National Congress | 13,006 | Mohan Singh | Independent politician | 12,058 |
| 122 | Etah | Ganga Prasad | Independent politician | 14,626 | Girdhar Gopal | Indian National Congress | 13,460 |
| 123 | Mainpuri | Malikhan Singh | Bharatiya Jana Sangh | 10,406 | Brijeshwar Sahai | Indian National Congress | 9,618 |
| 124 | Ghiror | Jai Deo Singh | Praja Socialist Party | 11,592 | Amrit Lal | Bharatiya Jana Sangh | 10,196 |
| 125 | Jasrana | Ram Swarup | Indian National Congress | 17,844 | Bishun Dayal | Praja Socialist Party | 14,549 |
| 126 | Shikohabad | Layaq Singh | Independent politician | 25,758 | Maharaj Singh | Indian National Congress | 13,997 |
| 127 | Karhal (SC) | Ram Din | Praja Socialist Party | 24,800 | Sheo Baksh Singh | Indian National Congress | 24,072 |
| 127 | Karhal (SC) | Nathu Singh | Praja Socialist Party | 33,231 | Daya Nand Vyas | Indian National Congress | 20,479 |
| 128 | Bhongaon | Ganesh Chandra | Indian National Congress | 8,925 | Subedar Singh | Independent politician | 5,041 |
| 129 | Lalitpur (SC) | Ram Nath Khera | Independent politician | 22,342 | Krishna Chandra Sharma | Indian National Congress | 21,033 |
| 129 | Lalitpur (SC) | Gaijju Ram | Indian National Congress | 25,178 | Baldeo | Independent politician | 17,160 |
| 130 | Jhansi | Atma Ram Govind Kher | Indian National Congress | 26,818 | Panna Lal Sharma | Independent politician | 10,762 |
| 131 | Mau (SC) | Sudama Prasad Goswami | Indian National Congress | 41,024 | Surat Singh Yadav | Independent politician | 22,529 |
| 131 | Mau (SC) | Beni Bai | Indian National Congress | 46,878 | Bal Krishna | Independent politician | 20,742 |
| 132 | Garautha | Lachman Rao Kadam | Indian National Congress | 17,384 | Prem Narain Tewari | Independent politician | 12,033 |
| 133 | Konch | Chittar Singh | Indian National Congress | 12,054 | Ganesh Prasad | Praja Socialist Party | 10,891 |
| 134 | Kalpi (SC) | Garib Das | Praja Socialist Party | 41,232 | Kr. Shiv Shanker Singh | Indian National Congress | 30,201 |
| 134 | Kalpi (SC) | Virendra Shah Judeo | Independent politician | 34,729 | Basant Lal | Indian National Congress | 25,622 |
| 135 | Jalaun | Govind Narain Tewari | Praja Socialist Party | 26,542 | Chaturbhuj | Indian National Congress | 25,613 |
| 136 | Hamirpur | Surendra Dutt Bajpai | Indian National Congress | 16,883 | Udit Narain | Praja Socialist Party | 11,653 |
| 137 | Maudaha | Ram Gopal | Indian National Congress | 25,475 | Nawal Kishore | Praja Socialist Party | 19,399 |
| 138 | Rath | Doogar Singh | Indian National Congress | 24,691 | Ram Narain Singh | Praja Socialist Party | 20,714 |
| 139 | Mahoba (SC) | Mohanlal | Indian National Congress | 22,221 | Madanpal Singh | Praja Socialist Party | 21,943 |
| 139 | Mahoba (SC) | Brij Gopal | Indian National Congress | 22,221 | Balendu Bhagwan Dass | Independent politician | 19,649 |
| 140 | Banda | Pahalwan Singh | Indian National Congress | 17,755 | Keshav Chandra Singh | Independent politician | 7,266 |
| 141 | Baberu | Ram Sanehi Bhartiya | Indian National Congress | 13,166 | Jageshwar | Praja Socialist Party | 5,853 |
| 142 | Karwi (SC) | Sai Dulari | Indian National Congress | 16,984 | Gulzar Singh | Praja Socialist Party | 12,162 |
| 142 | Karwi (SC) | Jagpat Singh | Indian National Congress | 22,173 | Murli Manohar | Akhil Bharatiya Ram Rajya Parishad | 16,949 |
| 143 | Naraini | Gopi Krishna Azad | Indian National Congress | 6,217 | Matola Singh | Bharatiya Jana Sangh | 5,230 |
| 144 | Kaimganj | Sultan Alam Khan | Indian National Congress | 18,206 | Makrand Singh | Praja Socialist Party | 10,346 |
| 145 | Shamsabad | Rajendra Singh Yadav | Praja Socialist Party | 18,818 | Sia Ram | Indian National Congress | 16,636 |
| 146 | Farrukhabad | Ram Kishan | Indian National Congress | 22,140 | Daya Ram | Bharatiya Jana Sangh | 7,097 |
| 147 | Bhojpur | Awadesh Chandra Singh | Indian National Congress | 14,990 | Mool Chand Verma | Praja Socialist Party | 7,808 |
| 148 | Kannauj | Hori Lal | Praja Socialist Party | 40,299 | Pati Ram | Indian National Congress | 39,098 |
| 148 | Kannauj | Dwarka | Praja Socialist Party | 44,198 | Kali Charan | Indian National Congress | 34,649 |
| 149 | Chhibramau | Kotwal Singh Bhadoria | Praja Socialist Party | 27,549 | Mathura Prasad | Indian National Congress | 18,334 |
| 150 | Etawah | Bhuvesh Bhushan | Bharatiya Jana Sangh | 12,043 | Hakim Hazik | Indian National Congress | 11,288 |
| 151 | Jaswantnagar | Abhe Ram | Independent politician | 17,851 | Prabal Pratap Singh | Indian National Congress | 10,297 |
| 152 | Bharthana | Meharban Singh | Indian National Congress | 17,783 | Sahdeo Singh | Praja Socialist Party | 15,727 |
| 152 | Bharthana | Ghasi Ram | Indian National Congress | 17,836 | Reghubar Dayal | Independent politician | 17,186 |
| 153 | Bidhuna | Gaiendra Singh | Praja Socialist Party | 18,361 | Raghunath Sahai | Indian National Congress | 11,310 |
| 154 | Auraiya | Bhajan Lal | Independent politician | 22,188 | Satya Narain Datt | Indian National Congress | 19,625 |
| 154 | Auraiya | Sukh Lal | Indian National Congress | 22,119 | Sukhbasi Lal | Independent politician | 13,306 |
| 155 | Bilhaur | Murli Dhar | Indian National Congress | 24,111 | Moti Lal Dahalvi | Independent politician | 16,342 |
| 155 | Bilhaur | Brij Rani Devi | Indian National Congress | 23,158 | Sheo Kumar | Independent politician | 14,164 |
| 156 | Akbarpur | Balwan Singh | Independent politician | 34,617 | Ram Dulare | Indian National Congress | 14,680 |
| 157 | Kanpur City I | Uma Shanker Shukla | Indian National Congress | 18,232 | Shakuntala Srivastava | Praja Socialist Party | 10,057 |
| 158 | Kanpur City II | Brahma Datta Dixit | Indian National Congress | 18,573 | Ganesh Datta | Praja Socialist Party | 13,378 |
| 159 | Kanpur City III | S . A . Hasan | Indian National Congress | 14,883 | Sakhawat Hussain | Praja Socialist Party | 6,276 |
| 160 | Kanpur City IV | S . G . Datta | Indian National Congress | 15,573 | Sant Singh Yusuf | Communist Party of India | 11,249 |
| 161 | Kanpur City V | Dr. Jawaharlal Rohatgi | Indian National Congress | 19,196 | Virendra Bahadur Singh | Praja Socialist Party | 9,758 |
| 162 | Kanpur Rural | Moti Lal | Independent politician | 15,766 | Beni Singh | Indian National Congress | 14,028 |
| 163 | Derapur | Shiva Ram | Indian National Congress | 14,696 | Chandra Shekhar Tiwari | Independent politician | 14,622 |
| 164 | Bhognipur | Ram Saroop | Independent politician | 24,727 | Ram Saroop Gupta | Indian National Congress | 15,774 |
| 165 | Ghatampur | Brij Bihari Mehrotra | Indian National Congress | 28,499 | Govardhan | Independent politician | 20,713 |
| 165 | Ghatampur | Jawala Prasad | Indian National Congress | 28,952 | Sheo Nath Singh | Independent politician | 24,355 |
| 166 | Fatehabad | Sukhrani | Indian National Congress | 18,272 | Man Singh Anand Chandra | Praja Socialist Party | 10,802 |
| 166 | Fatehabad | Sheoraj Bali Singh | Indian National Congress | 21,559 | Kunj Bihari | Akhil Bharatiya Ram Rajya Parishad | 9,787 |
| 167 | Khajuha | Shabbir Hasan | Indian National Congress | 12,102 | Deep Narain Singh | Independent politician | 8,933 |
| 168 | Kishunpur | Raghunath Sahai | Indian National Congress | 25,191 | Lal Chandan Singh | Independent politician | 17,802 |
| 168 | Kishunpur | Jageshwar | Indian National Congress | 25,398 | Ram Singh | Independent politician | 13,810 |
| 169 | Khaga | Basudeo | Indian National Congress | 16,588 | Chandra Kishore | Communist Party of India | 4,798 |
| 170 | Manjhanpur | Jawahar Lal | Indian National Congress | 28,998 | Ram Dulare | Praja Socialist Party | 18,175 |
| 170 | Manjhanpur | Hemwati Nandan Bahuguna | Indian National Congress | 33,731 | Bhanu Pratap Singh | Praja Socialist Party | 14,047 |
| 171 | Chail | Syed Muzaffar Husain | Indian National Congress | 37,159 | Shanker | Bharatiya Jana Sangh | 7,895 |
| 171 | Chail | Gokul Prasad | Indian National Congress | 37,164 | Chhedi Lal | Praja Socialist Party | 9,003 |
| 172 | Allahabad City North | Kailash Narain Gupta | Indian National Congress | 23,075 | K . K . Bhatcharya | Praja Socialist Party | 18,681 |
| 173 | Allahabad City South | Kalyan Chandra Mohiley | Praja Socialist Party | 21,600 | Baijnath Kapoor | Indian National Congress | 19,584 |
| 174 | Saraon West | Parmanand Sinha | Indian National Congress | 16,709 | Ram Sajiwan | Independent politician | 9,039 |
| 175 | Saraon East | Sangram Singh | Indian National Congress | 22,300 | Ram Nath | Independent politician | 7,525 |
| 176 | Phulpur | Sukhi Ram Bhartiya | Indian National Congress | 40,678 | Maha Narain | Praja Socialist Party | 10,970 |
| 176 | Phulpur | Shiv Murti | Indian National Congress | 42,976 | Roop Nath | Independent politician | 20,073 |
| 177 | Kewai | Mahabir Prasad Shukla | Indian National Congress | 23,297 | Ram Nath Dubey | Praja Socialist Party | 7,946 |
| 178 | Karchana | Kamal Kumari Goindi | Indian National Congress | 21,638 | Satya Narain Pandey | Praja Socialist Party | 10,670 |
| 179 | Meja | Mangla Prasad | Indian National Congress | 41,653 | Saligram Jaiswal | Praja Socialist Party | 36,590 |
| 179 | Meja | Jokhai | Indian National Congress | 45,846 | Bans Rup | Praja Socialist Party | 40,053 |
| 180 | Mirzapur | Amresh Chand | Indian National Congress | 23,519 | Bhagwan Dass | Bharatiya Jana Sangh | 23,104 |
| 181 | Kantit | Ram Kisun | Indian National Congress | 32,260 | Ram Autar | Praja Socialist Party | 28,467 |
| 181 | Kantit | Aziz Imam | Indian National Congress | 32,745 | Bhudeo Dubey | Praja Socialist Party | 29,029 |
| 182 | Robertsganj | Anand Brahma Shah | Bharatiya Jana Sangh | 36,952 | Braj Bhushan | Indian National Congress | 24,764 |
| 182 | Robertsganj | Shobh Nath | Bharatiya Jana Sangh | 26,077 | Ram Sarup | Indian National Congress | 20,856 |
| 183 | Ahraura | Raj Narain | Indian National Congress | 17,332 | Tribhuan Singh | Bharatiya Jana Sangh | 9,020 |
| 184 | Chunar | Raj Kumar | Indian National Congress | 17,881 | Vishram Singh | Independent politician | 14,609 |
| 185 | Chandauli | Kamlapati Tripathi | Indian National Congress | 46,596 | Prabhu Narain Singh | Independent politician | 39,124 |
| 185 | Chandauli | Ram Lakhan | Indian National Congress | 46,320 | Narendra Kumar | Independent politician | 34,462 |
| 186 | Mahaich | Kamta Pd. Vidyarthi | Indian National Congress | 23,564 | Achaibar | Independent politician | 10,400 |
| 187 | Mughalsarai | Shyam Lal | Indian National Congress | 18,260 | Uma Shankar | Independent politician | 11,394 |
| 188 | Katehari | Lok Nath | Indian National Congress | 24,473 | Raghunath | Independent politician | 20,528 |
| 189 | Varanasi City South | Sampurnanand Ji | Indian National Congress | 29,002 | Rustam Satin | Communist Party of India | 16,578 |
| 190 | Varanasi City North | Mohammad Abdus Samad | Indian National Congress | 23,665 | Rama Nand Singh | Bharatiya Jana Sangh | 13,564 |
| 191 | Sheopur | Mahnot Sajjan Devi | Indian National Congress | 24,522 | Ram Narayan | Praja Socialist Party | 18,990 |
| 192 | Kolasla | Udal | Communist Party of India | 22,089 | Lal Bahadur | Indian National Congress | 19,823 |
| 193 | Kaswar Sarkari | Raj Narain Singh | Independent politician | 25,367 | Rishi Narain Shastri | Indian National Congress | 23,467 |
| 194 | Kaswar Raja | Raj Behari Singh | Indian National Congress | 13,628 | Gaya Prasad | Independent politician | 10,144 |
| 195 | Gyanpur | Vechan Ram | Indian National Congress | 27,766 | Ram Naresh | Communist Party of India | 17,040 |
| 195 | Gyanpur | Bechan Ram Gupta | Indian National Congress | 33,349 | Ganesh Ram | Independent politician | 25,954 |
| 196 | Barsathi | Ramesh Chand | Indian National Congress | 18,772 | Ram Murti Singh | Communist Party of India | 6,465 |
| 197 | Mariahu | Tara Devi | Indian National Congress | 20,712 | Jagannath | Bharatiya Jana Sangh | 10,723 |
| 198 | Machhlishahr | Muhammad Rauf Jafri | Indian National Congress | 22,756 | Keshari Pandit | Praja Socialist Party | 13,909 |
| 199 | Garwara | Nageshwar Prasad | Indian National Congress | 19,413 | Gauri Shankar | Independent politician | 12,379 |
| 200 | Shahganj | Kunwar Sripal | Independent politician | 38,391 | Lakshmi Shankar Yadav | Indian National Congress | 34,021 |
| 200 | Shahganj | Mata Prasad | Indian National Congress | 37,746 | Zamirul Hasan | Praja Socialist Party | 14,494 |
| 201 | Ravi | Ram Lakhan | Indian National Congress | 17,813 | Jang Bahadur | Bharatiya Jana Sangh | 8,959 |
| 202 | Jaunpur | Yadvendra Dutt Dubey | Bharatiya Jana Sangh | 34,502 | Bhagwati Din Tewari | Indian National Congress | 11,933 |
| 203 | Kerakat | Lal Bahadur | Indian National Congress | 39,561 | Sarat Kumar | Bharatiya Jana Sangh | 9,281 |
| 203 | Kerakat | Ram Samjhawan | Indian National Congress | 38,949 | Bhagwan | Bharatiya Jana Sangh | 7,579 |
| 204 | Saidpur | Atma | Indian National Congress | 12,562 | Kamla | Independent politician | 9,784 |
| 205 | Shadiabad | Dev Ram | Indian National Congress | 13,448 | Raj Narain Singh | Independent politician | 12,384 |
| 205 | Shadiabad | Jamuna | Praja Socialist Party | 18,730 | Raj Narain Singh | Independent politician | 12,384 |
| 206 | Karanda | Bishwanath Singh Gautam | Indian National Congress | 11,801 | Dalsingar Dubey | Independent politician | 9,289 |
| 207 | Ghazipur | Pabbar Ram | Communist Party of India | 17,134 | Shushila Devi | Indian National Congress | 16,089 |
| 208 | Zamania | Bashishta Narain Sharma | Indian National Congress | 18,403 | Vishwanath Singh | Praja Socialist Party | 11,319 |
| 209 | Mohammadabad | Raghubir | Communist Party of India | 26,274 | Chintaman | Indian National Congress | 23,066 |
| 209 | Mohammadabad | Sarju Pande | Communist Party of India | 27,653 | Vijay Shankar Singh | Indian National Congress | 26,274 |
| 210 | Kopachit | Mandhata | Indian National Congress | 9,046 | Kamta | Communist Party of India | 8,248 |
| 211 | Ballia | Gauri Shankar | Praja Socialist Party | 15,463 | Kalyani Devi | Indian National Congress | 11,988 |
| 212 | Doaba | Ram Nath Pathak | Indian National Congress | 10,534 | Surendra Vikram | Independent politician | 8,552 |
| 213 | Bansdih East | Ram Lachhan | Indian National Congress | 14,201 | Kedar Nath Singh | Praja Socialist Party | 12,093 |
| 214 | Bansdih West | Sheo Mangal Singh | Indian National Congress | 19,127 | Baijnath Singh | Independent politician | 9,289 |
| 215 | Sikandrapur | Jagarnath | Indian National Congress | 19,959 | Baij Nath | Communist Party of India | 17,177 |
| 216 | Rasra | Ganga Pd. Singh | Indian National Congress | 29,064 | Kapil Deo | Communist Party of India | 22,806 |
| 216 | Rasra | Ram Ratan | Indian National Congress | 24,740 | Raghunath | Communist Party of India | 21,251 |
| 217 | Nathupur | Ram Sundar | Praja Socialist Party | 20,204 | Mangal Deo | Indian National Congress | 14,378 |
| 218 | Ghosi | Jharkhande Rai | Communist Party of India | 19,320 | Rameshwar Prasad | Indian National Congress | 18,829 |
| 219 | Kopaganj | M . A . Latif Nowani | Indian National Congress | 12,871 | Jai Bahadur Singh | Communist Party of India | 11,016 |
| 220 | Mohammadabad-Gohna | Shri Nath | Indian National Congress | 19,554 | Surjan | Communist Party of India | 18,487 |
| 220 | Mohammadabad-Gohna | Chandrajit | Communist Party of India | 21,774 | Padma Nath | Indian National Congress | 19,554 |
| 221 | Lalganj | Dhani Ram | Indian National Congress | 18,779 | Rama Nand | Praja Socialist Party | 14,125 |
| 221 | Lalganj | Tej Bahadur | Independent politician | 22,483 | Satya Deo | Praja Socialist Party | 14,550 |
| 222 | Mahul | Ram Bachan | Indian National Congress | 18,690 | Hargun | Praja Socialist Party | 13,059 |
| 222 | Mahul | Murli Dhar | Indian National Congress | 20,256 | Daulat Ram | Praja Socialist Party | 17,867 |
| 223 | Nizamabad | Chandra Bali Brahmachari | Indian National Congress | 10,593 | Anirudh Singh | Independent politician | 8,245 |
| 224 | Azamgarh | Bisram | Praja Socialist Party | 14,231 | Sheo Ram | Indian National Congress | 8,437 |
| 225 | Atraulia | Padmakar | Praja Socialist Party | 17,032 | Brij Behari | Indian National Congress | 12,787 |
| 226 | Gopalpur | Mukti Nath | Indian National Congress | 16,702 | Bhima Prasad | Independent politician | 12,080 |
| 227 | Sagri | Indra Bhushan | Independent politician | 12,650 | Shambhu Narain | Communist Party of India | 10,475 |
| 228 | Salempur East | Ayodhya Pandit Arya | Indian National Congress | 13,159 | Kailash | Praja Socialist Party | 7,159 |
| 229 | Salempur South | Sheo Bachan | Indian National Congress | 11,300 | Raja Audesh Pratap Mall | Independent politician | 11,086 |
| 230 | Salempur West | Ugrasen | Independent politician | 16,601 | Dev Nandan | Indian National Congress | 10,966 |
| 231 | Deoria South | Deep Narain | Indian National Congress | 11,443 | Kishuna | Independent politician | 11,019 |
| 232 | Silhat | Ramji Sahai | Indian National Congress | 19,946 | Tribeni | Praja Socialist Party | 5,190 |
| 232 | Silhat | Dr. Sita Ram | Indian National Congress | 30,777 | Chandrabali Singh | Independent politician | 19,946 |
| 233 | Deoria North | Mohd. Farooq Chishti | Indian National Congress | 13,732 | Rama Shanker | Independent politician | 13,077 |
| 234 | Hata | Surya Bali | Indian National Congress | 11,915 | Bankey Lal | Praja Socialist Party | 11,161 |
| 235 | Sidhuwa Jobna | Raj Deo | Indian National Congress | 35,552 | Jagannath | Praja Socialist Party | 13,076 |
| 235 | Sidhuwa Jobna | Sheo Prasad | Indian National Congress | 32,230 | Raj Banshi | Praja Socialist Party | 11,452 |
| 236 | Padrauna North | Chanradeo | Indian National Congress | 19,360 | Ram Prasad | Praja Socialist Party | 9,558 |
| 237 | Padrauna West | Brij Nandan | Praja Socialist Party | 9,920 | Mangal Upadhya | Indian National Congress | 9,457 |
| 238 | Padrauna East | Genda Singh | Praja Socialist Party | 19,586 | Ram Lal | Indian National Congress | 9,476 |
| 239 | Padrauna South | Ramayan | Praja Socialist Party | 14,045 | Bhairo Nath | Indian National Congress | 10,563 |
| 240 | Tilpur | Madan | Independent politician | 22,425 | Paripurnanand Verma | Indian National Congress | 16,030 |
| 241 | Maharajganj | Amar Nath | Independent politician | 42,733 | Yadavendra | Indian National Congress | 18,620 |
| 241 | Maharajganj | Duryodhan | Independent politician | 35,639 | Sukh Deo | Indian National Congress | 15,444 |
| 242 | Binaikpur | Abdul Rauf Lari | Independent politician | 19,682 | Raghubar Prasad | Indian National Congress | 12,823 |
| 243 | Pharenda West | Gauri Ram | Indian National Congress | 19,456 | Narsing Narain Pandey | Independent politician | 16,176 |
| 244 | Pharenda East | Dwarika Pd. | Indian National Congress | 15,316 | Ramanuj | Independent politician | 14,404 |
| 245 | Gorakhpur | Istifa Husain | Indian National Congress | 28,299 | Laxmi Shankar Verma | Independent politician | 5,811 |
| 246 | Maghar | Keshbhan | Indian National Congress | 19,019 | Kamla | Independent politician | 6,044 |
| 247 | Maniram | Keshav Pandey | Indian National Congress | 20,832 | Avaidyanathh | Independent politician | 15,153 |
| 248 | Pipraich | Ram Surat | Indian National Congress | 23,863 | Ganga Bishun | Praja Socialist Party | 10,521 |
| 248 | Pipraich | Achhaibar | Indian National Congress | 29,272 | Dighe Madhukar | Independent politician | 11,521 |
| 249 | Bhawapar | Bhagwati Prasad | Indian National Congress | 21,974 | Paras Nath Rai | Praja Socialist Party | 5,915 |
| 250 | Bansgaon | Jasoda | Indian National Congress | 24,963 | Haribansh | Communist Party of India | 5,315 |
| 250 | Bansgaon | Ganesh Prasad | Indian National Congress | 22,911 | Markandey Singh | Independent politician | 4,971 |
| 251 | Chillupar | Kailashpati | Indian National Congress | 13,178 | Satya Deo | Communist Party of India | 5,054 |
| 252 | Mahauli | Dhanushdhari | Indian National Congress | 17,445 | Ram Vir | Bharatiya Jana Sangh | 7,028 |
| 253 | Khalilabad | Raja Ram Sharma | Indian National Congress | 45,388 | Ram Sunder | Independent politician | 14,341 |
| 253 | Khalilabad | Genda Devi | Indian National Congress | 45,824 | Vishwanat Agarwal | Independent politician | 20,754 |
| 254 | Bansi East | Sohan Lal Dhusiya | Indian National Congress | 36,823 | Jai Karan Dhar | Independent politician | 31,467 |
| 254 | Bansi East | Obaidur Rahman | Indian National Congress | 37,741 | Dukhi Ram | Independent politician | 34,294 |
| 255 | Naugarh | Mathura Prasad | Indian National Congress | 27,440 | Bashishra Narain | Communist Party of India | 7,675 |
| 256 | Banganga East | Mohd. Suleman | Indian National Congress | 20,552 | Moti Lal | Bharatiya Jana Sangh | 8,278 |
| 257 | Banganga West | Prabhu Dayal | Indian National Congress | 20,701 | Madho Chandra Lal | Bharatiya Jana Sangh | 15,188 |
| 258 | Bansi West | Ram Lakhan Misra | Indian National Congress | 24,542 | Harish Chandra Lal | Independent politician | 11,136 |
| 259 | Domariaganj North | Rajendra Kishori | Indian National Congress | 20,800 | Bhanu Pratap Singh | Independent politician | 17,433 |
| 260 | Domariaganj South | Baleshwari Pandit Singh | Independent politician | 24,196 | Mohd. Adil Abbasi | Indian National Congress | 22,106 |
| 261 | Basti | Udai Shankar | Indian National Congress | 22,143 | Jantrai Prasad | Independent politician | 9,101 |
| 262 | Nagar | Kripa Shankar | Indian National Congress | 41,741 | Shakuntala Nayar | Independent politician | 39,345 |
| 262 | Nagar | Ram Lal | Indian National Congress | 40,381 | Ram Gharib | Independent politician | 37,188 |
| 263 | Harraiya West | Ran Bahadur | Indian National Congress | 14,392 | Bhagwan Prasad | Independent politician | 8,632 |
| 264 | Harraiya East | Sita Ram Shukla | Indian National Congress | 10,673 | Bhagwan Singh | Independent politician | 10,033 |
| 265 | Kaiserganj | Hukum Singh | Indian National Congress | 23,393 | Athar Mehdi | Independent politician | 11,519 |
| 266 | Fakharpur | Pratap Bahadur Singh | Independent politician | 28,388 | Sia Ram | Indian National Congress | 19,076 |
| 266 | Fakharpur | Dulara Devi | Indian National Congress | 23,193 | Ram Adhar Kanaujia | Independent politician | 19,724 |
| 267 | Nanpara | Budhi Lal | Independent politician | 15,435 | Mohd. Saadat Ali Khan | Independent politician | 11,032 |
| 268 | Charda | Hamidullah Khan | Indian National Congress | 13,540 | Mithoo Lal | Independent politician | 10,236 |
| 269 | Bahraich North | Zargham Haider | Praja Socialist Party | 14,864 | Triloki Nath Kaul | Indian National Congress | 11,991 |
| 270 | Bahraich South | Birendra Bikram Singh | Independent politician | 15,832 | Basant Lal | Indian National Congress | 10,801 |
| 271 | Ikauna | Sheo Saran Lal | Indian National Congress | 24,916 | Lalji Sahai | Independent politician | 14,307 |
| 271 | Ikauna | Raj Kishore | Indian National Congress | 28,670 | Rameshwar Prasad | Akhil Bharatiya Ram Rajya Parishad | 18,593 |
| 272 | Tulsipur | Dharmapal Singh | Bharatiya Jana Sangh | 19,918 | Ballabhaddar Prasad | Indian National Congress | 19,618 |
| 273 | Balrampur | Din Dayal Karun | Indian National Congress | 31,039 | Kailash Nath | Bharatiya Jana Sangh | 28,712 |
| 273 | Balrampur | Dashrath Prasad | Bharatiya Jana Sangh | 37,017 | Sant Bakhsh Singh | Indian National Congress | 25,499 |
| 274 | Gonda North | Ram Abhilakh | Bharatiya Jana Sangh | 10,845 | Naurang Singh | Independent politician | 10,427 |
| 275 | Gonda South | Ragho Ram | Independent politician | 21,329 | Lal Behari Tandon | Indian National Congress | 18,656 |
| 275 | Gonda South | Ganga Prasad | Indian National Congress | 20,659 | Bhagwati Prasad | Independent politician | 17,458 |
| 276 | Utraula | Ali Jarrar Jafery | Indian National Congress | 23,194 | Suraj Lal | Bharatiya Jana Sangh | 22,297 |
| 277 | Sadullanagar | Taj Bahadur Singh | Independent politician | 12,499 | Abdul Wahid | Independent politician | 8,945 |
| 278 | Mankapur | Raghavendra Pratap Singh | Independent politician | 34,194 | Brij Nandan | Indian National Congress | 16,656 |
| 279 | Mahadewa | Baldeo Singh | Independent politician | 12,354 | Devendra Pratap Singh | Indian National Congress | 12,198 |
| 280 | Tarabganj | Shitla Prasad | Indian National Congress | 12,375 | Main Bahadur Singh | Bharatiya Jana Sangh | 5,884 |
| 281 | Paharapur | Lachmi Narain | Independent politician | 12,169 | Shanti Chand | Indian National Congress | 8,876 |
| 282 | Sarju | Saraswati Devi | Indian National Congress | 16,854 | Girja Prasad | Independent politician | 10,452 |
| 283 | Bhitauli | Vishal Singh | Indian National Congress | 26,193 | Ram Asrey | Independent politician | 20,298 |
| 284 | Barabanki | Bhagavti Prasad | Independent politician | 37,921 | Nasirur Rahman | Indian National Congress | 33,648 |
| 284 | Barabanki | Nattha Ram | Independent politician | 35,315 | Tula Ram Rawat | Indian National Congress | 31,594 |
| 285 | Pratabganj | Babu Lal Kushmesh | Indian National Congress | 37,568 | Jagjiwan Baksh | Independent politician | 34,244 |
| 285 | Pratabganj | Bindumati Devi | Indian National Congress | 37,229 | Mendi Lal | Independent politician | 24,868 |
| 286 | Rudauli | Mukut Behari Lal | Bharatiya Jana Sangh | 16,022 | Latifur Rahman | Indian National Congress | 15,021 |
| 287 | Haidergarh | Bajrang Behari Lal | Independent politician | 27,614 | Uma Shankar Misra | Indian National Congress | 19,940 |
| 287 | Haidergarh | Jang Bahadur | Independent politician | 21,118 | Ghanshiam Das | Indian National Congress | 17,543 |
| 288 | Amsin | Madan Gopal | Indian National Congress | 14,363 | Har Govind Srivastava | Communist Party of India | 5,739 |
| 289 | Faizabad | Madan Mohan | Indian National Congress | 19,668 | Bhagwati Singh | Bharatiya Jana Sangh | 7,364 |
| 290 | Bikapur West | Narain Das | Indian National Congress | 17,139 | Dhoom Prasad | Bharatiya Jana Sangh | 15,087 |
| 290 | Bikapur West | Brij Basi Lal | Indian National Congress | 18,186 | Hari Nath | Bharatiya Jana Sangh | 15,770 |
| 291 | Bikapur East | Avadesh Pratap Singh | Independent politician | 16,882 | Mahadeo Varma | Independent politician | 8,733 |
| 292 | Tanda | Jai Ram Varma | Indian National Congress | 39,685 | Jeet Bahadur Singh | Praja Socialist Party | 21,077 |
| 292 | Tanda | Sukh Ram | Indian National Congress | 30,296 | Badal Ram | Independent politician | 21,029 |
| 293 | Surhurpur | Ram Narain Tripathi | Independent politician | 13,225 | Mukhtar Ahmed Kidwai | Indian National Congress | 10,748 |
| 294 | Akbarpur | Ramrati Devi | Indian National Congress | 19,816 | Daulat Ram | Independent politician | 11,478 |
| 294 | Akbarpur | Devi Prasad | Independent politician | 21,443 | Daulat Ram | Independent politician | 11,478 |
| 295 | Kadipur | Kashi Prasad | Indian National Congress | 24,170 | Jagram | Communist Party of India | 18,679 |
| 295 | Kadipur | Shanker | Indian National Congress | 23,577 | Kedar Nath Singh | Independent politician | 18,054 |
| 296 | Baraunsa | Muhammad Abdul Sami | Indian National Congress | 11,493 | Ram Chandra Shukul | Independent politician | 5,384 |
| 297 | Isauli | Gaya Bux | Bharatiya Jana Sangh | 12,139 | Ram Bali | Indian National Congress | 11,744 |
| 298 | Sultanpur | Kuer Krishna | Indian National Congress | 15,969 | Maqbool Khan | Praja Socialist Party | 12,475 |
| 299 | Musafirkhana | Ram Bali | Independent politician | 20,220 | Shyam Lal | Indian National Congress | 12,608 |
| 299 | Musafirkhana | Gur Prasad Singh | Indian National Congress | 21,125 | Oudhesh Narain Singh | Independent politician | 14,132 |
| 300 | Amethi | Rama Kant Singh | Indian National Congress | 16,970 | Bijai Pal | Independent politician | 8,159 |
| 301 | Lambhua | Prabhawati Devi | Indian National Congress | 11,917 | Savitri Devi | Independent politician | 9,167 |
| 302 | Patti | Harkesh Bahadur | Indian National Congress | 21,221 | Deota Din | Independent politician | 15,537 |
| 302 | Patti | Ram Kinkar | Indian National Congress | 23,896 | Ram Phal | Independent politician | 11,283 |
| 303 | Konhdaur | Ruknuddin Khan | Indian National Congress | 16,529 | Basdeo Singh | Independent politician | 10,996 |
| 304 | Pratapgarh South | Bhagwati Prasad | Indian National Congress | 18,393 | Babu Lal | Bharatiya Jana Sangh | 10,670 |
| 305 | Pratapgarh North | Ram Adhar Tiwari | Indian National Congress | 15,691 | Bhusan Pratap Singh | Independent politician | 12,520 |
| 306 | Atheha | Amola Devi | Indian National Congress | 14,101 | Kunwar Tej Bhan Singh | Independent politician | 13,283 |
| 307 | Kunda | Nand Ram | Independent politician | 38,739 | Ram Naresh | Indian National Congress | 31,966 |
| 307 | Kunda | Gaya Prasad | Independent politician | 27,504 | Ram Swaroop | Indian National Congress | 27,149 |
| 308 | Bachhrawan | Chandrika Prasad | Indian National Congress | 19,760 | Bhagwan Din | Independent politician | 12,962 |
| 308 | Bachhrawan | Rameshwar Prasad | Indian National Congress | 21,077 | Ram Krishna | Independent politician | 14,800 |
| 309 | Rokha | Wasi Naqvi | Indian National Congress | 13,873 | Gopi Chandra | Bharatiya Jana Sangh | 13,747 |
| 310 | Rae Bareli North | Jamuna Prasad | Bharatiya Jana Sangh | 12,704 | Ram Shankar | Indian National Congress | 11,476 |
| 311 | Salon | Sunita Chauhan | Indian National Congress | 30,795 | Shiva Prasad Pandiya | Praja Socialist Party | 27,432 |
| 311 | Salon | Ram Prasad | Indian National Congress | 29,600 | Ram Din | Praja Socialist Party | 26,063 |
| 312 | Dalmau | Sheo Shankar Singh | Independent politician | 16,321 | Shambhu | Independent politician | 14,393 |
| 313 | Sareni | Guptar Singh | Indian National Congress | 17,853 | Narendra Bahadur Singh | Bharatiya Jana Sangh | 9,884 |
| 314 | Purwa | Parmeshwar Din Varma | Independent politician | 12,764 | Ramadhin Singh | Indian National Congress | 10,469 |
| 315 | Bhagwant Nagar | Bhagwati Singh Visharad | Praja Socialist Party | 15,238 | Deo Datta | Indian National Congress | 14,496 |
| 316 | Unnao | Ch. Khazan Singh | Praja Socialist Party | 20,072 | Liladhar | Indian National Congress | 18,351 |
| 317 | Safipur | Sheo Gopal | Independent politician | 29,959 | Badri Prasad | Indian National Congress | 15,567 |
| 317 | Safipur | Mulla | Communist Party of India | 26,101 | Gokul Lal | Praja Socialist Party | 14,739 |
| 318 | Hasanganj | Bhikha Lal | Communist Party of India | 24,294 | Jata Shankar | Indian National Congress | 19,758 |
| 318 | Hasanganj | Sajiwan Lal | Communist Party of India | 25,450 | Sewa Ram | Indian National Congress | 20,188 |
| 319 | Mohanlalganj | Khayali Ram | Praja Socialist Party | 20,312 | Raja Vijai Kumar | Indian National Congress | 19,617 |
| 319 | Mohanlalganj | Ram Saran Yadav | Praja Socialist Party | 23,708 | Ram Shankar Ravivasi | Indian National Congress | 18,460 |
| 320 | Malihabad | Ram Pal Trivedi | Indian National Congress | 12,531 | Ahmad Wali Khan | Communist Party of India | 11,905 |
| 321 | Lucknow City East | Triloki Singh | Praja Socialist Party | 27,271 | Chandra Bhanu Gupta | Indian National Congress | 15,875 |
| 322 | Lucknow City Central | Mahabir Prasad Srivastava | Indian National Congress | 18,940 | Krishna Gopal Kalantri | Bharatiya Jana Sangh | 10,413 |
| 323 | Lucknow City West | Syed Ali Zaheer | Indian National Congress | 20,294 | Raj Kumar | Bharatiya Jana Sangh | 11,120 |
| 323 | Lucknow City West | Basant Lal | Indian National Congress | 18,855 | Chhotey Lal | Bharatiya Jana Sangh | 11,640 |
| 324 | Lucknow Cantonment | Shyam Manohar Misra | Indian National Congress | 18,849 | Govind Prasad | Bharatiya Jana Sangh | 10,162 |
| 325 | Shahabad | Vidyavati Bajpai | Indian National Congress | 41,781 | Kalika Baksh Singh | Bharatiya Jana Sangh | 19,140 |
| 325 | Shahabad | Kanhaiya Lal Balmiki | Indian National Congress | 35,441 | Ram Moorti | Praja Socialist Party | 19,525 |
| 326 | Hardoi | Mahesh Singh | Indian National Congress | 41,903 | Surendra Nath | Bharatiya Jana Sangh | 27,280 |
| 326 | Hardoi | Bulaqi Ram | Indian National Congress | 42,530 | Jhamman Lal | Bharatiya Jana Sangh | 25,165 |
| 327 | Gondwa | Rajendra Singh | Bharatiya Jana Sangh | 18,848 | Laxmi Devi | Indian National Congress | 17,277 |
| 328 | Sandila | Shambhu Dayal | Praja Socialist Party | 40,054 | Tika Ram | Indian National Congress | 31,276 |
| 328 | Sandila | Mohan Lal Varma | Praja Socialist Party | 49,081 | Aiza Rasool | Indian National Congress | 28,303 |
| 329 | Bilgram | Chandra Has Misra | Indian National Congress | 19,041 | Triyugi Nath | Bharatiya Jana Sangh | 11,203 |
| 330 | Pali | Hari Har Baksh Singh | Indian National Congress | 24,739 | Sharda Baksh Singh | Bharatiya Jana Sangh | 24,383 |
| 331 | Sidhauli | Baiju Ram | Indian National Congress | 34,118 | Vishwa Ram Varma | Praja Socialist Party | 28,133 |
| 331 | Sidhauli | Tara Chand Maheshwari | Indian National Congress | 33,261 | Haniman Pd. Misra | Praja Socialist Party | 24,638 |
| 332 | Misrikh | Avedhesh Kumar | Independent politician | 33,337 | Ganga Dhar Sharma | Indian National Congress | 26,089 |
| 332 | Misrikh | Mool Chand | Independent politician | 27,135 | Shakuntala Devi | Indian National Congress | 23,294 |
| 333 | Sitapur | Harish Chandra | Indian National Congress | 19,964 | Sharda Nand | Bharatiya Jana Sangh | 17,617 |
| 334 | Khairabad | Tambreshwari Prasad | Bharatiya Jana Sangh | 12,370 | Krishna Chandra Gupta | Indian National Congress | 12,174 |
| 335 | Biswan | Suresh Prakash Singh | Indian National Congress | 32,682 | Paras Ram | Independent politician | 21,342 |
| 335 | Biswan | Ganeshi Lal | Indian National Congress | 31,703 | Radhey Shiam | Independent politician | 13,496 |
| 336 | Laharpur | Bhan Prakash Singh | Independent politician | 33,409 | Bashir Ahmed | Indian National Congress | 13,828 |
| 337 | Dhaurahra | Jagannath Prasad | Praja Socialist Party | 13,741 | Ram Bhajan | Indian National Congress | 9,872 |
| 338 | Nighasan | Surath Bahadur Shah | Praja Socialist Party | 16,193 | Karan Singh | Indian National Congress | 10,864 |
| 339 | Sri Nagar | Chhedi Lal | Praja Socialist Party | 21,170 | Bhoodar Lal | Indian National Congress | 18,886 |
| 339 | Sri Nagar | Banshi Dhan | Praja Socialist Party | 23,199 | Chaudhari Chhedalal | Indian National Congress | 18,454 |
| 340 | Kheri | Sheo Prasad Nagar | Praja Socialist Party | 15,542 | Godawari | Indian National Congress | 12,454 |
| 341 | Mohammdi | Jagdish Narain Datta Singh | Bharatiya Jana Sangh | 40,046 | Jai Chand | Indian National Congress | 29,381 |
| 341 | Mohammdi | Manna Lal | Bharatiya Jana Sangh | 39,149 | Kamal Ahmad Rizvi | Indian National Congress | 8,745 |

== See also ==
- 1957 elections in India
