= 2nd Uttar Pradesh Assembly =

Legislature in Uttar Pradesh

Second Legislative Assembly of Uttar Pradesh (Second Vidhan Sabha of Uttar Pradesh)
- Second Vidhan Sabha
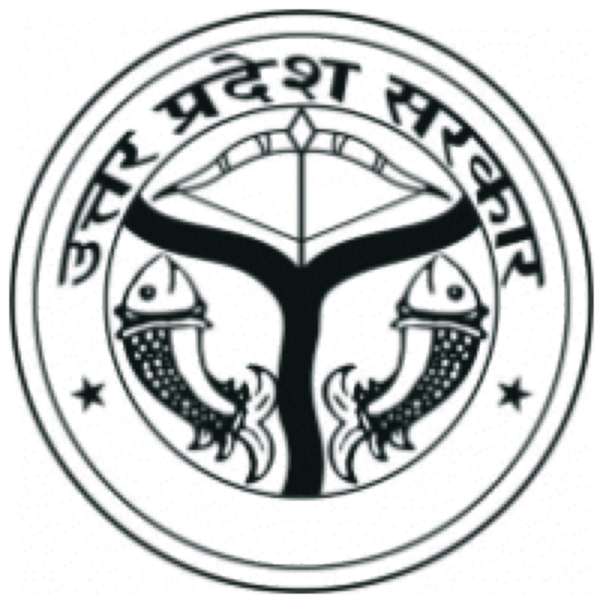
- Uttar Pradesh Government Seal

Type
- Type: Bicameral of Uttar Pradesh
- Houses: Uttar Pradesh Legislative Assembly
- Term limits: 5 years

History
- Founded: 1 April 1957
- Disbanded: 6 March 1962
- Preceded by: 1st Legislative Assembly
- Succeeded by: 3rd Legislative Assembly
- New session started: 10 Apr 1957

Leadership
- Chief Minister: Sampurnanand, Indian National Congress since 1957 elections
- Speaker of the Assembly: Atmaram Govind Kher, Indian National Congress since 1957 elections
- Deputy Speaker: Ramnarayan Tripathi, Indian National Congress since 1957 elections
- Leader of the Opposition: Triloki Singh, Praja Socialist Party since 1957 elections
- Finance minister: Hafiz Ibrahim (1953-59); Syed Ali Zaheer (1959-61); Har Govind Singh (1961-63)
- Minister of Parliamentary Affairs: S. Ali Zaheer (1957-60); Mangala Prasad (1961-62)
- Principal Secretary: D. N. Mithal

Structure
- Lower House political groups: INC (286); PSP (44); BJS (17); CPI (09); RRP (0); IND (74)
- Member of the Legislative Assembly: 431

Elections
- Lower House voting system: FPTP
- Last Lower House election: 25 Feb 1957
- Next Lower House election: Feb 1962

Meeting place
- Vidhan Bhawan विधान भवन

Website
- uplegisassembly.gov.in

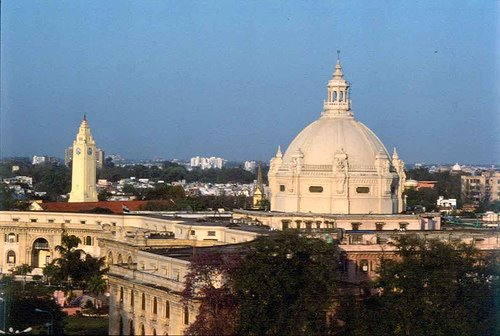
Vidhan Bhawan building in Lucknow.

The Second Legislative Assembly of Uttar Pradesh (a.k.a.Second Vidhan Sabha of Uttar Pradesh) was constituted on 1 April 1957 as a result of 1957 Uttar Pradesh Legislative Assembly election which was concluded on 25 February 1957. The Second Legislative Assembly had 430 elected and 1 nominated MLAs. The assembly was in house for full term of five years before being dissolved on 6 Mar 1962.

== Important members ==
Sampurnanand was the second Chief Minister of Uttar Pradesh. He succeeded Govind Ballabh Pant of his party and served as a Chief Minister from 1954 to 1960. In 1960, due to a political crisis initiated by Kamlapati Tripathi and Chandra Bhanu Gupta, Sampurnanand was asked to quit the post of Chief Minister and was sent to Rajasthan as the Governor. Following were the important members of the Second Legislative Assembly of Uttar Pradesh. Keshav Gupta was a freedom fighter from Muzaffarnagar and one of the founders of the Indian National Congress in Uttar Pradesh.

#	From	To	Position	Name	Party
01	1957	1960	Chief Minister	Sampurnanand	Indian National Congress
02	1960	1962	Chief Minister	Chandra Bhanu Gupta	Indian National Congress
03	1957	1962	Speaker of the Assembly	Atmaram Govind Kher	Indian National Congress
04	1957	1962	Deputy Speaker	Ramnarayan Tripathi	Indian National Congress
05	1957	1962	Leader of the Opposition	Triloki Singh	Praja Socialist Party
06	1953	1959	Finance minister	Hafiz Mohamad Ibrahim	Indian National Congress
07	1959	1961	Finance minister	Syed Ali Zaheer	Indian National Congress
08	1961	1963	Finance minister	Har Govind Singh	Indian National Congress
09	1957	1960	Minister of Parliamentary Affairs	S. Ali Zaheer	Indian National Congress
10	1961	1962	Minister of Parliamentary Affairs	Mangala Prasad	Indian National Congress
11	1957	1962	Principal Secretary	D. N. Mithal	-

== Party wise strength ==
As of 10 Apr 1957, total 430 MLAs were elected from 341 constituencies of Uttar Pradesh.

	Party		Apr 1957
01	Indian National Congress	INC	286
02	Independent	IND	74
03	Praja Socialist Party	PSP	44
04	Bhartiya Jana Sangh	BJS	17
05	Communist Party of India	CPI	09
06	Akhil Bharatiya Ram Rajya Parishad	RRP	00
Total			430

== Electors ==
	Male	Female	Others	Total
Electors	-	-	-	34,762,073
Electors who voted	-	-	-	21,918,604
Polling percentage	-	-	-	44.77%

== List of constituencies and elected members ==
ID	Assembly constituency	Reserved	Winner	Party	Votes	Runner up	Party	Votes
01	Pithoragarh	SC	Khushi Ram	INC	11,931	Durga Datt	PSP	9,042
01	Pithoragarh	SC	Narendra Singh	INC	14,984	Jayant Lal	PSP	8,835
02	Almora	None	Govind Singh	BJS	13,930	Govardhan	INC	12,918
03	Danpur	None	Mohan Singh	INC	9,043	Jagannath	PSP	5,982
04	Ranikhet North	None	Hari Datt	INC	11,650	Madan Mohan	PSP	8,619
05	Ranikhet South	None	Jang Bahadur	INC	10,158	Govind Singh	PSP	7,606
06	Badrinath	None	Ghansyam	IND	16,365	Shridhar Azad	INC	6,546
07	Kedarnath	None	Narendra Singh	INC	13,083	Gangadhar	IND	10,900
08	Pauri	None	Chandar Singh	INC	11,020	Shridharanand	IND	5,300
09	Lansdowne	None	Ram Prasad	INC	12,824	Padma Datt	IND	10,854
10	Ganga Salan	None	Jagmohan Singh	INC	11,818	Pratap Singh	IND	8,051
11	Deoprayag	None	Vinay Lakshmi	INC	-	Uncontested	-	-
12	Tehri	None	Surat Chand	INC	-	Uncontested	-	-
13	Rawain	None	Jayendra Singh	INC	-	Uncontested	-	-
14	Mussoorie	None	Gulab Singh	IND	21,074	Surat Singh	INC	17,537
15	Dehra Dun	None	Brij Bhushan Saran	INC	13,793	Durga Prasad	IND	9,218
16	Hardwar	None	Shanti Prapanna Sharma	INC	21,491	Sumer Chand	IND	7,093
17	Jwalapur	None	Said Ahmed	INC	30,576	Nathu Ram	BJS	14,353
18	Roorkee	None	Din Dayal Shastri	INC	24,326	Baru Mal	IND	12,093
19	Deoband	SC	Yashpal Singh	IND	57,185	Thakur Phool Singh	INC	38,021
19	Deoband	SC	Har Deva	INC	41,104	Sangat Singh	IND	27,487
20	Saharanpur	None	Manzurul Nabi	INC	17,278	Brahma Datt Mayor	IND	11,462
21	Muzaffarabad	None	Mahmud Ali Khan	INC	19,034	Jugul Kishore	IND	8,239
22	Harora	SC	Jai Gopal	INC	27,808	Abdulla	IND	22,399
22	Harora	SC	Shakuntala Devi	INC	26,465	Om Prakash	IND	18,440
23	Nakur	None	Ch. Data Ram	INC	24,518	Qazi Masood	IND	17,473
24	Bhawan	None	Ghayur Ali Khan	PSP	25,933	Keshav Gupta	INC	25,258
25	Kairana	None	Virendra Verma	INC	24,174	Sultan Singh	PSP	22,733
26	Muzaffarnagar	None	Dwarka Prasad	INC	25,251	Prem Sukh	PSP	8,354
27	Jansath	SC	Ram Das	INC	38,816	Ashok Krishna Kant	CPI	11,279
27	Jansath	SC	Ahmed Bakhsh	INC	37,356	Said Murtaza	IND	27,443
28	Shikarpur	SC	Badam Singh	INC	38,771	Raghubir Singh	BJS	12,587
28	Shikarpur	SC	Rajendra Datt	INC	36,516	Deen Mohammad	IND	17,386
29	Budhana	None	Kunwar Asghar Ali	IND	32,725	Shri Chand	INC	28,425
30	Sardhana	SC	Ramji Lal Sahayak	INC	49,889	Manphool	BJS	18,170
30	Sardhana	SC	Faten Singh Rana	INC	51,992	Shiam Singh	IND	40,212
31	Kotana	None	Charan Singh	INC	27,075	Vijaipal Singh	IND	26,451
32	Baraut	None	Acharya Dipankar	IND	21,107	Harkhayal Singh	INC	18,490
33	Baghpat	None	Raghubir Singh	INC	22,145	Bharat Singh	CPI	10,110
34	Ghaziabad	None	Teja Singh	INC	17,505	P. Chandra	BJS	9,614
35	Dasna	None	Kr. Mahmood Ali Khan	INC	26,845	Baljit Singh	IND	26,761
36	Modinagar	None	Cichitra Narayan Sharma	INC	34,733	Hukam Singh	PSP	10,689
37	Hapur	SC	Veer Sen	INC	55,309	Parmatma Sharan	BJS	19,845
37	Hapur	SC	Lutf Ali Khan	INC	59,737	Parmanand	IND	31,326
38	Hastinapur	None	Bishember Singh	INC	25,245	Pitam Singh	CPI	10,365
39	Meerut Cantonment	None	Prakashwati Sud	INC	24,360	Shanti Swaroop	CPI	12,976
40	Kithore	SC	Shradha Devi	INC	64,142	Devi Dayal	IND	20,721
40	Kithore	SC	Hari Singh	INC	57,518	Beshember Datta	IND	14,199
41	Meerut City	None	Kailash Prakash	INC	27,059	Aizaz Husain	IND	18,604
42	Dadri	None	Satyawati	INC	19,144	Mahraj Singh	IND	10,394
43	Sikandrabad	None	Ram Chander Vikal	INC	27,427	Ali Hadi	PSP	8,387
44	Bulandshahr	None	Raghuraj Singh	PSP	32,870	Banarasi Dass	INC	19,105
45	Khurja	SC	Gopali	IND	30,228	Kewal Singh	INC	28,556
45	Khurja	SC	Chattar Singh	IND	30,839	Bhim Sen	INC	28,548
46	Debai	None	Himmat Singh	BJS	20,413	Chunni Lal	INC	16,755
47	Anupshahr	None	Dharam Singh	INC	35,215	Beni Prasad	PSP	31,347
47	Anupshahr	None	Din Dayal	INC	37,236	Kehar Singh	PSP	31,134
48	Siana	SC	Irtaza Husain	INC	20,046	Har Pal	PSP	17,207
49	Agota	None	Jagbir Singh	PSP	21,797	Mohan Singh	INC	21,432
50	Najibabad	None	Hafiz Mohd. Ibrahim	INC	32,321	Naipal Singh	BJS	19,312
51	Afzalgarh	None	Allah Bux	IND	17,178	Ratan Lal	INC	10,795
52	Bijnor	None	Chandrawati	INC	21,771	Chandan Singh	CPI	19,281
53	Chandpur	None	Nardeo Singh	IND	20,624	Shive Kumar	INC	20,262
54	Nagina	None	Govind Sahai	INC	27,266	Thamman Singh	BJS	15,056
55	Dhampur	SC	Khub Singh	INC	40,123	Hari Pal Singh	BJS	22,842
55	Dhampur	SC	Girdhari Lal	INC	41,106	Sant Ram	BJS	24,873
56	Hasanpur	SC	Sukhan Lal	INC	23,921	Tika Ram	PSP	18,855
56	Hasanpur	SC	Jagdish Prasad	INC	26,193	Prabhu Singh	IND	22,550
57	Bahjoi	None	Badhi Singh	PSP	14,896	Jagdish Saran Rastogi	INC	13,606
58	Sambhal	None	Mahmood Husain Khan	IND	22,351	Zarif Husain	INC	14,570
59	Amroha	None	Ram Kumar	IND	20,843	Latafat Husain	INC	18,538
60	Kanth	None	Jitendra Pratap Singh	INC	-	Uncontested	-	-
61	Thakurdwara	None	Kishan Singh	INC	22,932	Harvansh Singh	PSP	11,304
62	Moradabad City	None	Halimuddin	IND	23,212	Wali Ahmad Khan	INC	12,862
63	Moradabad Rural	None	Khamani Singh	IND	13,467	Dau Dayal Khanna	INC	13,271
64	Bilari	SC	Jagdish Narain	INC	22,468	Akhtar Hussain	IND	17,308
64	Bilari	SC	Mahi Lal	INC	21,931	Om Prakash Sharma	IND	17,185
65	Rampur	None	Aslam Khan	IND	17,241	Fazal Haq Khan	INC	12,415
66	Shahabad	SC	Baldeo Singh Arya	INC	33,265	Sohan Lal	PSP	21,956
66	Shahabad	SC	Kalyan Rai	INC	39,293	Ram Kishan	PSP	27,362
67	Suar Tanda	None	Mahmood Ali Khan	INC	24,564	Akhtar Ali Khan	IND	16,876
68	Baheri	None	Ram Murti	INC	18,843	Cheda Lal	IND	16,781
69	Sirauli	None	Vaidya Dharam Datt	INC	18,936	Bhawan Sahai	PSP	13,683
70	Aonla	None	Nawal Kishore	INC	17,834	Brij Mohan Lal	PSP	14,389
71	Faridpur	SC	Sunder Lal	INC	17,764	Pemi	BJS	9,515
71	Faridpur	SC	Nathu Singh	INC	20,583	Brij Raj Singh	IND	16,046
72	Bareilly City	None	Jagdish Saran Agarwal	INC	18,560	Ram Ballabh	BJS	11,120
73	Bareilly Cantt.	None	Mohammad Hussain	INC	12,646	Krishna Murai Lal Asar	PSP	9,106
74	Bhojipura	None	Baboo Ram	INC	14,659	Jai Dev	PSP	13,200
75	Nawabganj	None	Sheo Raj Bahadur	PSP	15,192	Naurang Lal	INC	14,382
76	Nainital	None	Narain Datt Tewari	PSP	15,730	Shyam Lal Varma	INC	14,176
77	Kashipur	None	Lakshman Datt	INC	22,843	Ram Datt	PSP	14,311
78	Tanakpur	None	Pratap Singh	PSP	9,948	Maqsood Alam Khan	INC	9,435
79	Pilibhit	None	Niranjan Singh	INC	9,664	Ram Kirshna Sahu	BJS	6,865
80	Bisalpur	SC	Behari Lal	PSP	25,196	Gomti Devi	INC	17,246
80	Bisalpur	SC	Munendrapal Singh	PSP	28,724	Nanhoo Mal Gangwar	INC	16,040
81	Powayan	SC	Kamle	IND	20,472	Govind	INC	15,636
81	Powayan	SC	Rajkumar Surendra Singh	IND	45,365	Rama Dhar	IND	18,831
82	Shahjahanpur	None	Ashfaq Ali	IND	11,021	Darshan Singh	IND	10,744
83	Jamuar	None	Dev Narain Bharti	IND	8,160	Ram Bilas Singh	IND	8,063
84	Tilhar	None	Balak Ram	IND	9,914	Damodar Dass	INC	8,276
85	Khera Bajehra	None	Room Singh	IND	10,117	Surendra Vikram Singh	INC	9,922
86	Jalalabad	None	Har Chandra Singh	IND	10,772	Bhagwan Saran	IND	9,690
87	Dataganj	None	Harish Chandra Singh	INC	19,217	Onkar Singh	BJS	15,587
88	Usehat	None	Moharik Ali Khan	IND	9,382	Nirottam Singh	BJS	7,791
89	Badaun	None	Tika Ram	IND	22,286	Asrar Ahmad	INC	20,833
90	Ujhani	None	Sri Krishan Goyal	INC	24,779	Nirottam Singh	CPI	4,989
91	Sahaswan	None	Ulfat Singh	IND	9,885	Mushtaq Ali	INC	9,304
92	Bisauli	SC	Kesho Ram	INC	26,980	Ratan Singh	PSP	18,295
92	Bisauli	SC	Shiv Raj Singh	INC	31,704	Shiam Singh	PSP	23,233
93	Islamnagar	None	Kailash Kumar Singh	INC	12,682	Suraj Pal Singh	PSP	11,002
94	Gunnaur	None	Jamuna Singh	PSP	14,361	Karan Singh	INC	11,007
95	Tappal	None	Deo Datta	INC	24,080	Mahabir Singh	IND	10,730
96	Aligarh	None	Anant Ram Varma	INC	20,655	L. N. Mathur	IND	7,270
97	Koil	SC	Mohan Lal Gautam	INC	36,472	Bhagwati Psasad Mauriya	IND	32,820
97	Koil	SC	Ram Prasad Deshmukh	INC	35,869	Chetanya Raj Singh	IND	32,297
98	Atrauli	None	Nek Ram Sharma	INC	30,168	Babu Singh	IND	24,168
99	Gangiri	None	Sri Niwas	INC	29,918	Shyam Sunde	IND	13,774
100	Sikandra Rao	None	Malkhan Singh	INC	18,707	Omkar	BJS	13,450
101	Hathras	SC	Nand Kumar Deo	INC	37,072	Gajadhar Singh	BJS	13,999
101	Hathras	SC	Har Dayal Singh	INC	31,094	Baldev	CPI	24,051
102	Iglas	None	Kishori Raman Singh	IND	19,856	Lakshmi Singh	IND	14,542
103	Mathura	None	Sri Nath	INC	25,923	Lakshman Prasad	BJS	17,008
104	Goverdhan	None	Jugal Kishore	INC	21,218	Kishun Lal	PSP	12,715
105	Chhata	None	Ramhet Singh	INC	23,151	Tikam Singh	IND	17,581
106	Mat	SC	Acharya Laxmi Raman	INC	41,951	Ganga Prasad	PSP	17,798
106	Mat	SC	Shyam Lal	INC	27,443	Radhey Shyam	PSP	15,574
107	Sadabad	None	Tika Ram	IND	22,364	Ashraf Ali Khan	INC	17,967
108	Fatehpur Sikri	None	Swami Visheshwaranand	PSP	23,832	Champawati	INC	14,599
109	Khairagarh	None	Sri Krishna Dutt Paliwal	IND	19,411	Jagan Prasad Rawat	INC	13,754
110	Agra City I	None	Adi Ram Singhal	INC	27,561	Baliji Bal Krishna	BJS	14,148
111	Agra City II	SC	Chhatrapati Ambesh	INC	46,595	Raj Nath Kunzru	IND	39,113
111	Agra City II	SC	Deoki Nandan Vibhav	INC	44,373	Mithan Lal	IND	32,660
112	Etmadpur	SC	Ganga Dhar	INC	22,121	Krishna Pal Singh	IND	14,292
112	Etmadpur	SC	Ram Singh	IND	27,366	Krishna Pal Singh	IND	14,292
113	Firozabad	None	Jagan Nath Lahri	IND	16,498	Haidar Bux	INC	11,909
114	Fatehabad	None	Laxmi Narain Bansal	INC	11,529	Hukam Singh	IND	9,408
115	Bah	None	Mahendra Ripudaman Singh	IND	34,721	Shambhu Nath Chaturvedi	INC	12,439
116	Jalesar	SC	Chiranji Lal	INC	21,748	Tursanpal Singh	BJS	16,251
116	Jalesar	SC	Raghubir Singh	PSP	26,504	Tursanpal Singh	BJS	16,251
117	Kasganj	None	Kali Charan	INC	15,713	Himmat Singh	PSP	12,416
118	Sahawar	None	Tirmal Singh	INC	16,537	Ram Chandra Singh	IND	7,800
119	Nidhpur	None	Shmshul Islam	INC	12,958	Vikramaditya Singh	IND	10,811
120	Aliganj	None	Bhup Kishore	IND	10,011	Mahabir Singh Karunesh	INC	9,047
121	Sirhpura	None	Chhotey Lal Paliwal	INC	13,006	Mohan Singh	IND	12,058
122	Etah	None	Ganga Prasad	IND	14,626	Girdhar Gopal	INC	13,460
123	Mainpuri	None	Malikhan Singh	BJS	10,406	Brijeshwar Sahai	INC	9,618
124	Ghiror	None	Jai Deo Singh	PSP	11,592	Amrit Lal	BJS	10,196
125	Jasrana	None	Ram Swarup	INC	17,844	Bishun Dayal	PSP	14,549
126	Shikohabad	None	Layaq Singh	IND	25,758	Maharaj Singh	INC	13,997
127	Karhal	SC	Ram Din	PSP	24,800	Sheo Baksh Singh	INC	24,072
127	Karhal	SC	Nathu Singh	PSP	33,231	Daya Nand Vyas	INC	20,479
128	Bhongaon	None	Ganesh Chandra	INC	8,925	Subedar Singh	IND	5,041
129	Lalitpur	SC	Ram Nath Khera	IND	22,342	Krishna Chandra Sharma	INC	21,033
129	Lalitpur	SC	Gaijju Ram	INC	25,178	Baldeo	IND	17,160
130	Jhansi	None	Atma Ram Govind Kher	INC	26,818	Panna Lal Sharma	IND	10,762
131	Mau	SC	Sudama Prasad Goswami	INC	41,024	Surat Singh Yadav	IND	22,529
131	Mau	SC	Beni Bai	INC	46,878	Bal Krishna	IND	20,742
132	Garautha	None	Lachman Rao Kadam	INC	17,384	Prem Narain Tewari	IND	12,033
133	Konch	None	Chittar Singh	INC	12,054	Ganesh Prasad	PSP	10,891
134	Kalpi	SC	Garib Das	PSP	41,232	Kr. Shiv Shanker Singh	INC	30,201
134	Kalpi	SC	Virendra Shah Judeo	IND	34,729	Basant Lal	INC	25,622
135	Jalaun	None	Govind Narain Tewari	PSP	26,542	Chaturbhuj	INC	25,613
136	Hamirpur	None	Surendra Dutt Bajpai	INC	16,883	Udit Narain	PSP	11,653
137	Maudaha	None	Ram Gopal	INC	25,475	Nawal Kishore	PSP	19,399
138	Rath	None	Doogar Singh	INC	24,691	Ram Narain Singh	PSP	20,714
139	Mahoba	SC	Mohanlal	INC	22,221	Madanpal Singh	PSP	21,943
139	Mahoba	SC	Brij Gopal	INC	22,221	Balendu Bhagwan Dass	IND	19,649
140	Banda	None	Pahalwan Singh	INC	17,755	Keshav Chandra Singh	IND	7,266
141	Baberu	None	Ram Sanehi Bhartiya	INC	13,166	Jageshwar	PSP	5,853
142	Karwi	SC	Sai Dulari	INC	16,984	Gulzar Singh	PSP	12,162
142	Karwi	SC	Jagpat Singh	INC	22,173	Murli Manohar	RRP	16,949
143	Naraini	None	Gopi Krishna Azad	INC	6,217	Matola Singh	BJS	5,230
144	Kaimganj	None	Sultan Alam Khan	INC	18,206	Makrand Singh	PSP	10,346
145	Shamsabad	None	Rajendra Singh Yadav	PSP	18,818	Sia Ram	INC	16,636
146	Farrukhabad	None	Ram Kishan	INC	22,140	Daya Ram	BJS	7,097
147	Bhojpur	None	Awadesh Chandra Singh	INC	14,990	Mool Chand Verma	PSP	7,808
148	Kannauj	SC	Hori Lal	PSP	40,299	Pati Ram	INC	39,098
148	Kannauj	SC	Dwarka	PSP	44,198	Kali Charan	INC	34,649
149	Chhibramau	None	Kotwal Singh Bhadoria	PSP	27,549	Mathura Prasad	INC	18,334
150	Etawah	None	Bhuvesh Bhushan	BJS	12,043	Hakim Hazik	INC	11,288
151	Jaswantnagar	None	Abhe Ram	IND	17,851	Prabal Pratap Singh	INC	10,297
152	Bharthana	SC	Meharban Singh	INC	17,783	Sahdeo Singh	PSP	15,727
152	Bharthana	SC	Ghasi Ram	INC	17,836	Reghubar Dayal	IND	17,186
153	Bidhuna	None	Gaiendra Singh	PSP	18,361	Raghunath Sahai	INC	11,310
154	Auraiya	SC	Bhajan Lal	IND	22,188	Satya Narain Datt	INC	19,625
154	Auraiya	SC	Sukh Lal	INC	22,119	Sukhbasi Lal	IND	13,306
155	Bilhaur	SC	Murli Dhar	INC	24,111	Moti Lal Dahalvi	IND	16,342
155	Bilhaur	SC	Brij Rani Devi	INC	23,158	Sheo Kumar	IND	14,164
156	Akbarpur	None	Balwan Singh	IND	34,617	Ram Dulare	INC	14,680
157	Kanpur City I	None	Uma Shanker Shukla	INC	18,232	Shakuntala Srivastava	PSP	10,057
158	Kanpur City II	None	Brahma Datta Dixit	INC	18,573	Ganesh Datta	PSP	13,378
159	Kanpur City III	None	S . A . Hasan	INC	14,883	Sakhawat Hussain	PSP	6,276
160	Kanpur City IV	None	S . G . Datta	INC	15,573	Sant Singh Yusuf	CPI	11,249
161	Kanpur City V	None	Dr. Jawaharlal Rohatgi	INC	19,196	Virendra Bahadur Singh	PSP	9,758
162	Kanpur Rural	None	Moti Lal	IND	15,766	Beni Singh	INC	14,028
163	Derapur	None	Shiva Ram	INC	14,696	Chandra Shekhar Tiwari	IND	14,622
164	Bhognipur	None	Ram Saroop	IND	24,727	Ram Saroop Gupta	INC	15,774
165	Ghatampur	SC	Brij Bihari Mehrotra	INC	28,499	Govardhan	IND	20,713
165	Ghatampur	SC	Jawala Prasad	INC	28,952	Sheo Nath Singh	IND	24,355
166	Fatehabad	SC	Sukhrani	INC	18,272	Man Singh Anand Chandra	PSP	10,802
166	Fatehabad	SC	Sheoraj Bali Singh	INC	21,559	Kunj Bihari	RRP	9,787
167	Khajuha	None	Shabbir Hasan	INC	12,102	Deep Narain Singh	IND	8,933
168	Kishunpur	SC	Raghunath Sahai	INC	25,191	Lal Chandan Singh	IND	17,802
168	Kishunpur	SC	Jageshwar	INC	25,398	Ram Singh	IND	13,810
169	Khaga	None	Basudeo	INC	16,588	Chandra Kishore	CPI	4,798
170	Manjhanpur	SC	Jawahar Lal	INC	28,998	Ram Dulare	PSP	18,175
170	Manjhanpur	SC	Hemwati Nandan Bahuguna	INC	33,731	Bhanu Pratap Singh	PSP	14,047
171	Chail	SC	Syed Muzaffar Husain	INC	37,159	Shanker	BJS	7,895
171	Chail	SC	Gokul Prasad	INC	37,164	Chhedi Lal	PSP	9,003
172	Allahabad City North	None	Kailash Narain Gupta	INC	23,075	K . K . Bhatcharya	PSP	18,681
173	Allahabad City South	None	Kalyan Chandra Mohiley	PSP	21,600	Baijnath Kapoor	INC	19,584
174	Saraon West	None	Parmanand Sinha	INC	16,709	Ram Sajiwan	IND	9,039
175	Saraon East	None	Sangram Singh	INC	22,300	Ram Nath	IND	7,525
176	Phulpur	SC	Sukhi Ram Bhartiya	INC	40,678	Maha Narain	PSP	10,970
176	Phulpur	SC	Shiv Murti	INC	42,976	Roop Nath	IND	20,073
177	Kewai	None	Mahabir Prasad Shukla	INC	23,297	Ram Nath Dubey	PSP	7,946
178	Karchana	None	Kamal Kumari Goindi	INC	21,638	Satya Narain Pandey	PSP	10,670
179	Meja	SC	Mangla Prasad	INC	41,653	Saligram Jaiswal	PSP	36,590
179	Meja	SC	Jokhai	INC	45,846	Bans Rup	PSP	40,053
180	Mirzapur	None	Amresh Chand	INC	23,519	Bhagwan Dass	BJS	23,104
181	Kantit	SC	Ram Kisun	INC	32,260	Ram Autar	PSP	28,467
181	Kantit	SC	Aziz Imam	INC	32,745	Bhudeo Dubey	PSP	29,029
182	Robertsganj	SC	Anand Brahma Shah	BJS	36,952	Braj Bhushan	INC	24,764
182	Robertsganj	SC	Shobh Nath	BJS	26,077	Ram Sarup	INC	20,856
183	Ahraura	None	Raj Narain	INC	17,332	Tribhuan Singh	BJS	9,020
184	Chunar	None	Raj Kumar	INC	17,881	Vishram Singh	IND	14,609
185	Chandauli	SC	Kamlapati Tripathi	INC	46,596	Prabhu Narain Singh	IND	39,124
185	Chandauli	SC	Ram Lakhan	INC	46,320	Narendra Kumar	IND	34,462
186	Mahaich	None	Kamta Pd. Vidyarthi	INC	23,564	Achaibar	IND	10,400
187	Moghal Sarai	None	Shyam Lal	INC	18,260	Uma Shankar	IND	11,394
188	Katehari	None	Lok Nath	INC	24,473	Raghunath	IND	20,528
189	Varanasi City South	None	Sampurnanand Ji	INC	29,002	Rustam Satin	CPI	16,578
190	Varanasi City North	None	Mohammad Abdus Samad	INC	23,665	Rama Nand Singh	BJS	13,564
191	Sheopur	None	Mahnot Sajjan Devi	INC	24,522	Ram Narayan	PSP	18,990
192	Kolasla	None	Udal	CPI	22,089	Lal Bahadur	INC	19,823
193	Kaswar Sarkari	None	Raj Narain Singh	IND	25,367	Rishi Narain Shastri	INC	23,467
194	Kaswar Raja	None	Raj Behari Singh	INC	13,628	Gaya Prasad	IND	10,144
195	Gyanpur	SC	Vechan Ram	INC	27,766	Ram Naresh	CPI	17,040
195	Gyanpur	SC	Bechan Ram Gupta	INC	33,349	Ganesh Ram	IND	25,954
196	Barsathi	None	Ramesh Chand	INC	18,772	Ram Murti Singh	CPI	6,465
197	Mariahu	None	Tara Devi	INC	20,712	Jagannath	BJS	10,723
198	Machhlishahr	None	Rauf Jafri	INC	22,756	Keshari Pd.	PSP	13,909
199	Garwara	None	Nageshwar Prasad	INC	19,413	Gauri Shankar	IND	12,379
200	Shahganj	SC	Kunwar Sripal	IND	38,391	Lakshmi Shankar Yadav	INC	34,021
200	Shahganj	SC	Mata Prasad	INC	37,746	Zamirul Hasan	PSP	14,494
201	Ravi	None	Ram Lakhan	INC	17,813	Jang Bahadur	BJS	8,959
202	Jaunpur	None	Yadvendra Dutt Dubey	BJS	34,502	Bhagwati Din Tewari	INC	11,933
203	Kerakat	SC	Lal Bahadur	INC	39,561	Sarat Kumar	BJS	9,281
203	Kerakat	SC	Ram Samjhawan	INC	38,949	Bhagwan	BJS	7,579
204	Saidpur	None	Atma	INC	12,562	Kamla	IND	9,784
205	Shadiabad	SC	Dev Ram	INC	13,448	Raj Narain Singh	IND	12,384
205	Shadiabad	SC	Jamuna	PSP	18,730	Raj Narain Singh	IND	12,384
206	Karanda	None	Bishwanath Singh Gautam	INC	11,801	Dalsingar Dubey	IND	9,289
207	Ghazipur	None	Pabbar Ram	CPI	17,134	Shushila Devi	INC	16,089
208	Zamania	None	Bashishta Narain Sharma	INC	18,403	Vishwanath Singh	PSP	11,319
209	Mohammadabad	SC	Raghubir	CPI	26,274	Chintaman	INC	23,066
209	Mohammadabad	SC	Sarju Pande	CPI	27,653	Vijay Shankar Singh	INC	26,274
210	Kopachit	None	Mandhata	INC	9,046	Kamta	CPI	8,248
211	Ballia	None	Gauri Shankar	PSP	15,463	Kalyani Devi	INC	11,988
212	Duaba	None	Ram Nath Pathak	INC	10,534	Surendra Vikram	IND	8,552
213	Bansdih East	None	Ram Lachhan	INC	14,201	Kedar Nath Singh	PSP	12,093
214	Bansdih West	None	Sheo Mangal Singh	INC	19,127	Baijnath Singh	IND	9,289
215	Sikandrapur	None	Jagarnath	INC	19,959	Baij Nath	CPI	17,177
216	Rasra	SC	Ganga Pd. Singh	INC	29,064	Kapil Deo	CPI	22,806
216	Rasra	SC	Ram Ratan	INC	24,740	Raghunath	CPI	21,251
217	Nathupur	None	Ram Sundar	PSP	20,204	Mangal Deo	INC	14,378
218	Ghosi	None	Jharkhande Rai	CPI	19,320	Rameshwar Prasad	INC	18,829
219	Kopaganj	None	M . A . Latif Nowani	INC	12,871	Jai Bahadur Singh	CPI	11,016
220	Mohammadabad Gohna	SC	Shri Nath	INC	19,554	Surjan	CPI	18,487
220	Mohammadabad Gohna	SC	Chandrajit	CPI	21,774	Padma Nath	INC	19,554
221	Lalganj	SC	Dhani Ram	INC	18,779	Rama Nand	PSP	14,125
221	Lalganj	SC	Tej Bahadur	IND	22,483	Satya Deo	PSP	14,550
222	Mahul	SC	Ram Bachan	INC	18,690	Hargun	PSP	13,059
222	Mahul	SC	Murli Dhar	INC	20,256	Daulat Ram	PSP	17,867
223	Nizamabad	None	Chandra Bali Brahmachari	INC	10,593	Anirudh Singh	IND	8,245
224	Azamgarh	None	Bisram	PSP	14,231	Sheo Ram	INC	8,437
225	Atraulia	None	Padmakar	PSP	17,032	Brij Behari	INC	12,787
226	Gopalpur	None	Mukti Nath	INC	16,702	Bhima Prasad	IND	12,080
227	Sagri	None	Indra Bhushan	IND	12,650	Shambhu Narain	CPI	10,475
228	Salempur East	None	Ayodhya Pd. Arya	INC	13,159	Kailash	PSP	7,159
229	Salempur South	None	Sheo Bachan	INC	11,300	Raja Audesh Pratap Mall	IND	11,086
230	Salempur West	None	Ugrasen	IND	16,601	Dev Nandan	INC	10,966
231	Deoria South	None	Deep Narain	INC	11,443	Kishuna	IND	11,019
232	Silhat	SC	Ramji Sahai	INC	19,946	Tribeni	PSP	5,190
232	Silhat	SC	Dr. Sita Ram	INC	30,777	Chandrabali Singh	IND	19,946
233	Deoria North	None	Mohd. Farooq Chishti	INC	13,732	Rama Shanker	IND	13,077
234	Hata	None	Surya Bali	INC	11,915	Bankey Lal	PSP	11,161
235	Sidhuwa Jobna	SC	Raj Deo	INC	35,552	Jagannath	PSP	13,076
235	Sidhuwa Jobna	SC	Sheo Prasad	INC	32,230	Raj Banshi	PSP	11,452
236	Padrauna North	None	Chanradeo	INC	19,360	Ram Prasad	PSP	9,558
237	Padrauna West	None	Brij Nandan	PSP	9,920	Mangal Upadhya	INC	9,457
238	Padrauna East	None	Genda Singh	PSP	19,586	Ram Lal	INC	9,476
239	Padrauna South	None	Ramayan	PSP	14,045	Bhairo Nath	INC	10,563
240	Tilpur	None	Madan	IND	22,425	Paripurnanand Verma	INC	16,030
241	Maharajganj	SC	Amar Nath	IND	42,733	Yadavendra	INC	18,620
241	Maharajganj	SC	Duryodhan	IND	35,639	Sukh Deo	INC	15,444
242	Binaikpur	None	Abdul Rauf Lari	IND	19,682	Raghubar Prasad	INC	12,823
243	Pharenda West	None	Gauri Ram	INC	19,456	Narsing Narain Pandey	IND	16,176
244	Pharenda East	None	Dwarika Pd.	INC	15,316	Ramanuj	IND	14,404
245	Gorakhpur	None	Istifa Husain	INC	28,299	Laxmi Shankar Verma	IND	5,811
246	Maghar	None	Keshbhan	INC	19,019	Kamla	IND	6,044
247	Maniram	None	Keshav Pandey	INC	20,832	Avaidyanathh	IND	15,153
248	Pipraich	SC	Ram Surat	INC	23,863	Ganga Bishun	PSP	10,521
248	Pipraich	SC	Achhaibar	INC	29,272	Dighe Madhukar	IND	11,521
249	Bhawapar	None	Bhagwati Prasad	INC	21,974	Paras Nath Rai	PSP	5,915
250	Bansgaon	SC	Jasoda	INC	24,963	Haribansh	CPI	5,315
250	Bansgaon	SC	Ganesh Prasad	INC	22,911	Markandey Singh	IND	4,971
251	Chillupar	None	Kailashpati	INC	13,178	Satya Deo	CPI	5,054
252	Mahauli	None	Dhanushdhari	INC	17,445	Ram Vir	BJS	7,028
253	Khalilabad	SC	Raja Ram Sharma	INC	45,388	Ram Sunder	IND	14,341
253	Khalilabad	SC	Genda Devi	INC	45,824	Vishwanat Agarwal	IND	20,754
254	Bansi East	SC	Sohan Lal Dhusiya	INC	36,823	Jai Karan Dhar	IND	31,467
254	Bansi East	SC	Obaidur Rahman	INC	37,741	Dukhi Ram	IND	34,294
255	Naugarh	None	Mathura Prasad	INC	27,440	Bashishra Narain	CPI	7,675
256	Banganga East	None	Mohd. Suleman	INC	20,552	Moti Lal	BJS	8,278
257	Banganga West	None	Prabhu Dayal	INC	20,701	Madho Chandra Lal	BJS	15,188
258	Bansi West	None	Ram Lakhan Misra	INC	24,542	Harish Chandra Lal	IND	11,136
259	Domariaganj North	None	Rajendra Kishori	INC	20,800	Bhanu Pratap Singh	IND	17,433
260	Domariaganj South	None	Baleshwari Pd. Singh	IND	24,196	Mohd. Adil Abbasi	INC	22,106
261	Basti	None	Udai Shankar	INC	22,143	Jantrai Prasad	IND	9,101
262	Nagar	SC	Kripa Shankar	INC	41,741	Shakuntala Nayar	IND	39,345
262	Nagar	SC	Ram Lal	INC	40,381	Ram Gharib	IND	37,188
263	Harraiya West	None	Ran Bahadur	INC	14,392	Bhagwan Prasad	IND	8,632
264	Harraiya East	None	Sita Ram Shukla	INC	10,673	Bhagwan Singh	IND	10,033
265	Kaisarganj	None	Hukum Singh	INC	23,393	Athar Mehdi	IND	11,519
266	Fakharpur	SC	Pratap Bahadur Singh	IND	28,388	Sia Ram	INC	19,076
266	Fakharpur	SC	Dulara Devi	INC	23,193	Ram Adhar Kanaujia	IND	19,724
267	Nanpara	None	Budhi Lal	IND	15,435	Mohd. Saadat Ali Khan	IND	11,032
268	Charda	None	Hamidullah Khan	INC	13,540	Mithoo Lal	IND	10,236
269	Bahraich North	None	Zargham Haider	PSP	14,864	Triloki Nath Kaul	INC	11,991
270	Bahraich South	None	Birendra Bikram Singh	IND	15,832	Basant Lal	INC	10,801
271	Ikauna	SC	Sheo Saran Lal	INC	24,916	Lalji Sahai	IND	14,307
271	Ikauna	SC	Raj Kishore	INC	28,670	Rameshwar Prasad	RRP	18,593
272	Tulsipur	None	Dharmapal Singh	BJS	19,918	Ballabhaddar Prasad	INC	19,618
273	Balrampur	SC	Din Dayal Karun	INC	31,039	Kailash Nath	BJS	28,712
273	Balrampur	SC	Dashrath Prasad	BJS	37,017	Sant Bakhsh Singh	INC	25,499
274	Gonda North	None	Ram Abhilakh	BJS	10,845	Naurang Singh	IND	10,427
275	Gonda South	SC	Ragho Ram	IND	21,329	Lal Behari Tandon	INC	18,656
275	Gonda South	SC	Ganga Prasad	INC	20,659	Bhagwati Prasad	IND	17,458
276	Utraula	None	Ali Jarrar Jafery	INC	23,194	Suraj Lal	BJS	22,297
277	Sadullanagar	None	Taj Bahadur Singh	IND	12,499	Abdul Wahid	IND	8,945
278	Mankapur	None	Raghavendra Pratap Singh	IND	34,194	Brij Nandan	INC	16,656
279	Mahadeva	None	Baldeo Singh	IND	12,354	Devendra Pratap Singh	INC	12,198
280	Tarabganj	None	Shitla Prasad	INC	12,375	Main Bahadur Singh	BJS	5,884
281	Paharapur	None	Lachmi Narain	IND	12,169	Shanti Chand	INC	8,876
282	Sarju	None	Saraswati Devi	INC	16,854	Girja Prasad	IND	10,452
283	Bhitauli	None	Vishal Singh	INC	26,193	Ram Asrey	IND	20,298
284	Barabanki	SC	Bhagavti Prasad	IND	37,921	Nasirur Rahman	INC	33,648
284	Barabanki	SC	Nattha Ram	IND	35,315	Tula Ram Rawat	INC	31,594
285	Pratabganj	SC	Babu Lal Kushmesh	INC	37,568	Jagjiwan Baksh	IND	34,244
285	Pratabganj	SC	Bindumati Devi	INC	37,229	Mendi Lal	IND	24,868
286	Rudauli	None	Mukut Behari Lal	BJS	16,022	Latifur Rahman	INC	15,021
287	Haidergarh	SC	Bajrang Behari Lal	IND	27,614	Uma Shankar Misra	INC	19,940
287	Haidergarh	SC	Jang Bahadur	IND	21,118	Ghanshiam Das	INC	17,543
288	Amsin	None	Madan Gopal	INC	14,363	Har Govind Srivastava	CPI	5,739
289	Faizabad	None	Madan Mohan	INC	19,668	Bhagwati Singh	BJS	7,364
290	Bikapur West	SC	Narain Das	INC	17,139	Dhoom Prasad	BJS	15,087
290	Bikapur West	SC	Brij Basi Lal	INC	18,186	Hari Nath	BJS	15,770
291	Bikapur East	None	Avadesh Pratap Singh	IND	16,882	Mahadeo Varma	IND	8,733
292	Tanda	SC	Jai Ram Varma	INC	39,685	Jeet Bahadur Singh	PSP	21,077
292	Tanda	SC	Sukh Ram	INC	30,296	Badal Ram	IND	21,029
293	Surhurpur	None	Ram Narain Tripathi	IND	13,225	Mukhtar Ahmed Kidwai	INC	10,748
294	Akbarpur	SC	Ramrati Devi	INC	19,816	Daulat Ram	IND	11,478
294	Akbarpur	SC	Devi Prasad	IND	21,443	Daulat Ram	IND	11,478
295	Kadipur	SC	Kashi Prasad	INC	24,170	Jagram	CPI	18,679
295	Kadipur	SC	Shanker	INC	23,577	Kedar Nath Singh	IND	18,054
296	Baraunsa	None	M. Abdul Sami	INC	11,493	Ram Chandra Shukul	IND	5,384
297	Issauli	None	Gaya Bux	BJS	12,139	Ram Bali	INC	11,744
298	Sultanpur	None	Kuer Krishna	INC	15,969	Maqbool Khan	PSP	12,475
299	Musafirkhana	SC	Ram Bali	IND	20,220	Shyam Lal	INC	12,608
299	Musafirkhana	SC	Gur Prasad Singh	INC	21,125	Oudhesh Narain Singh	IND	14,132
300	Amethi	None	Rama Kant Singh	INC	16,970	Bijai Pal	IND	8,159
301	Lambhua	None	Prabhawati Devi	INC	11,917	Savitri Devi	IND	9,167
302	Patti	SC	Harkesh Bahadur	INC	21,221	Deota Din	IND	15,537
302	Patti	SC	Ram Kinkar	INC	23,896	Ram Phal	IND	11,283
303	Konhdaur	None	Ruknuddin Khan	INC	16,529	Basdeo Singh	IND	10,996
304	Pratapgarh South	None	Bhagwati Prasad	INC	18,393	Babu Lal	BJS	10,670
305	Pratapgarh North	None	Ram Adhar Tiwari	INC	15,691	Bhusan Pratap Singh	IND	12,520
306	Atheha	None	Amola Devi	INC	14,101	Kunwar Tej Bhan Singh	IND	13,283
307	Kunda	SC	Nand Ram	IND	38,739	Ram Naresh	INC	31,966
307	Kunda	SC	Gaya Prasad	IND	27,504	Ram Swaroop	INC	27,149
308	Bachhrawan	SC	Chandrika Prasad	INC	19,760	Bhagwan Din	IND	12,962
308	Bachhrawan	SC	Rameshwar Prasad	INC	21,077	Ram Krishna	IND	14,800
309	Rokha	None	Wasi Naqvi	INC	13,873	Gopi Chandra	BJS	13,747
310	Rae Bareli North	None	Jamuna Prasad	BJS	12,704	Ram Shankar	INC	11,476
311	Salon	SC	Sunita Chauhan	INC	30,795	Shiva Prasad Pandiya	PSP	27,432
311	Salon	SC	Ram Prasad	INC	29,600	Ram Din	PSP	26,063
312	Dalmau	None	Sheo Shankar Singh	IND	16,321	Shambhu	IND	14,393
313	Sareni	None	Guptar Singh	INC	17,853	Narendra Bahadur Singh	BJS	9,884
314	Purwa	None	Parmeshwar Din Varma	IND	12,764	Ramadhin Singh	INC	10,469
315	Bhagwant Nagar	None	Bhagwati Singh Visharad	PSP	15,238	Deo Datta	INC	14,496
316	Unnao	None	Ch. Khazan Singh	PSP	20,072	Liladhar	INC	18,351
317	Safipur	SC	Sheo Gopal	IND	29,959	Badri Prasad	INC	15,567
317	Safipur	SC	Mulla	CPI	26,101	Gokul Lal	PSP	14,739
318	Hasanganj	SC	Bhikha Lal	CPI	24,294	Jata Shankar	INC	19,758
318	Hasanganj	SC	Sajiwan Lal	CPI	25,450	Sewa Ram	INC	20,188
319	Mohanlalganj	SC	Khayali Ram	PSP	20,312	Raja Vijai Kumar	INC	19,617
319	Mohanlalganj	SC	Ram Saran Yadav	PSP	23,708	Ram Shankar Ravivasi	INC	18,460
320	Malihabad	None	Ram Pal Trivedi	INC	12,531	Ahmad Wali Khan	CPI	11,905
321	Lucknow City East	None	Triloki Singh	PSP	27,271	Chandra Bhanu Gupta	INC	15,875
322	Lucknow City Central	None	Mahabir Prasad Srivastava	INC	18,940	Krishna Gopal Kalantri	BJS	10,413
323	Lucknow City West	None	Syed Ali Zaheer	INC	20,294	Raj Kumar	BJS	11,120
323	Lucknow City West	None	Basant Lal	INC	18,855	Chhotey Lal	BJS	11,640
324	Lucknow Cantonment	SC	Shyam Manohar Misra	INC	18,849	Govind Prasad	BJS	10,162
325	Shahabad	SC	Vidyavati Bajpai	INC	41,781	Kalika Baksh Singh	BJS	19,140
325	Shahabad	SC	Kanhaiya Lal Balmiki	INC	35,441	Ram Moorti	PSP	19,525
326	Hardoi	SC	Mahesh Singh	INC	41,903	Surendra Nath	BJS	27,280
326	Hardoi	SC	Bulaqi Ram	INC	42,530	Jhamman Lal	BJS	25,165
327	Gondwa	None	Rajendra Singh	BJS	18,848	Laxmi Devi	INC	17,277
328	Sandila	SC	Shambhu Dayal	PSP	40,054	Tika Ram	INC	31,276
328	Sandila	SC	Mohan Lal Varma	PSP	49,081	Aiza Rasool	INC	28,303
329	Bilgram	None	Chandra Has Misra	INC	19,041	Triyugi Nath	BJS	11,203
330	Pali	None	Hari Har Baksh Singh	INC	24,739	Sharda Baksh Singh	BJS	24,383
331	Sidhauli	SC	Baiju Ram	INC	34,118	Vishwa Ram Varma	PSP	28,133
331	Sidhauli	SC	Tara Chand Maheshwari	INC	33,261	Haniman Pd. Misra	PSP	24,638
332	Misrikh	SC	Avedhesh Kumar	IND	33,337	Ganga Dhar Sharma	INC	26,089
332	Misrikh	SC	Mool Chand	IND	27,135	Shakuntala Devi	INC	23,294
333	Sitapur	None	Harish Chandra	INC	19,964	Sharda Nand	BJS	17,617
334	Khairabad	None	Tambreshwari Prasad	BJS	12,370	Krishna Chandra Gupta	INC	12,174
335	Biswan	SC	Suresh Prakash Singh	INC	32,682	Paras Ram	IND	21,342
335	Biswan	SC	Ganeshi Lal	INC	31,703	Radhey Shiam	IND	13,496
336	Laharpur	None	Bhan Prakash Singh	IND	33,409	Bashir Ahmed	INC	13,828
337	Dhaurahra	None	Jagannath Prasad	PSP	13,741	Ram Bhajan	INC	9,872
338	Nighasan	None	Surath Bahadur Shah	PSP	16,193	Karan Singh	INC	10,864
339	Sri Nagar	SC	Chhedi Lal	PSP	21,170	Bhoodar Lal	INC	18,886
339	Sri Nagar	SC	Banshi Dhan	PSP	23,199	Chaudhari Chhedalal	INC	18,454
340	Kheri	None	Sheo Prasad Nagar	PSP	15,542	Godawari	INC	12,454
341	Mohammadi	SC	Jagdish Narain Datta Singh	BJS	40,046	Jai Chand	INC	29,381
341	Mohammadi	SC	Manna Lal	BJS	39,149	Kamal Ahmad Rizvi	INC	8,745

== See also ==
- Government of Uttar Pradesh
- List of chief ministers of Uttar Pradesh
- Politics of India
- Sixteenth Legislative Assembly of Uttar Pradesh
- Uttar Pradesh Legislative Assembly
