= Abdul Rauf Lari =

Indian politician (born 1916)

Member of the Uttar Pradesh Legislative Assembly

Personal details
- Born: 16 July 1916 Lar in Deoria district, Uttar Pradesh, India
- Party: Bharatiya Kranti Dal, Janata Party (1977)

Abdul Rauf Lari (Hindi: अब्दुल रऊफ लारी, born 16 July 1916) was an Indian independence activist and politician. He was the member of Uttar Pradesh legislative assembly from Luxmipur assembly constituency previously in district of Gorakhpur.

== Political life ==
Abdul Rauf was elected for the first time in the general elections, 2nd Uttar Pradesh Legislative Assemblyof (1957) as an Independent Progressive Legislative Party. And in the general elections of 1974, he was elected as a member of the Uttar Pradesh Legislative Assembly after winning from Bharatiya Kranti Dal. In addition, he worked as a Deputy Minister (Handlooms) under state government formed by the Janata Party in Uttar Pradesh (1977).
