= Mohan Lal Verma =

Indian independence activist (1912-1979)

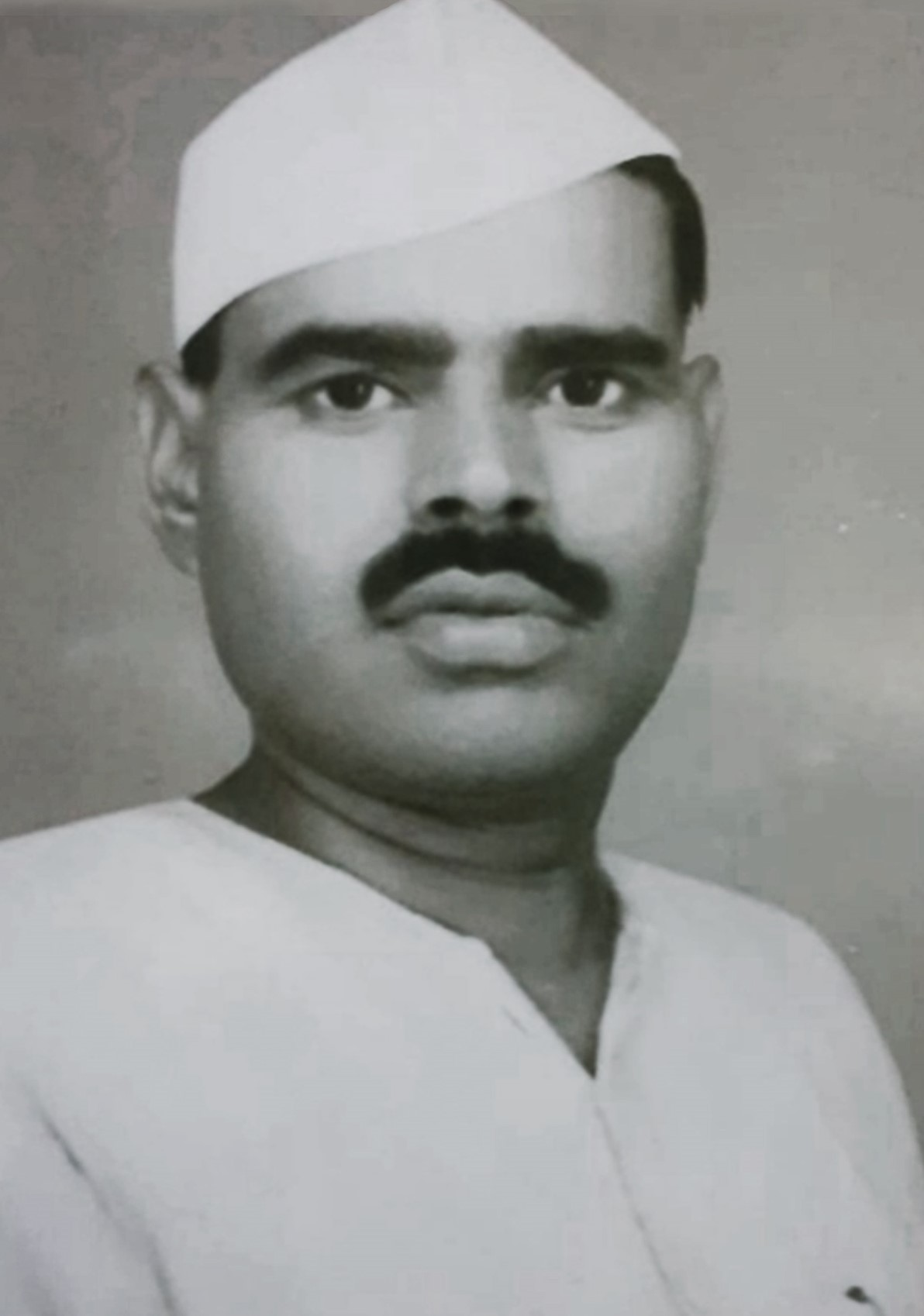
- Born: 12 October 1912; Raebareli, United Provinces of Agra and Oudh, British India (now Uttar Pradesh, India)
- Died: 9 January 1979 (aged 66)
- Known for: Freedom Fighter and Political Leader
- Movement: Indian Freedom Movement

Member of Second Legislative Assembly of Uttar Pradesh
- Constituency: Sandila

Member of Third Legislative Assembly of Uttar Pradesh
- Constituency: Gauny-Gondwa

Mohan Lal Verma was a leader of Indian independence movement and a lifelong follower of Mahatma Gandhi. After independence he was appointed as MLC - Member of the State Legislative Council (Vidhan Parishad) from Hardoi constituency from 1948 to 1952. After this tenure he also served the district of Hardoi for a decade as MLA- Member of the Legislative Assembly for two consecutive terms from 1957 to 1967. He won his first MLA election from Sandila constituency in 1957 and again in 1962 from erstwhile Gondwa constituency. Even after his political career he continued to serve the people of Hardoi and bring development to the district until his death.

== Early life ==
Mohan Lal was born in Raebareli, Uttar Pradesh, on 12 October 1912. His father was Prayag Datt Verma, a prosperous landlord, and his mother was Raj Rani Verma. The family migrated to Hardoi after a few years of his birth but within a few years of moving to Hardoi, Mohan Lal's father died. Due to the local traditions of the time, women were not allowed to move out of their houses, hence his mother could not manage their properties and businesses, and a number of them were lost. In spite of his family's hardships, Mohan Lal continued to support his mother as a young child.

== Contribution to the Indian independence movement ==
In his early childhood, Verma realised India was ruled by the British and he wanted to see his country freed from colonialism. When he was in 9th grade, he left home to join the freedom movement led by Mahatma Gandhi. His family was worried about him as they knew the consequences of getting captured by the British. Verma played a key role in mobilising the people of Hardoi and neighbouring towns to join the movement. He was appointed as Head of Congress Seva Dal in 1932 for Hardoi district.

In 1930, Gandhi launched the Salt Satyagraha and 5 May 1930, he was arrested at Karadi near Dandi for violating the Salt Law, section 144 was imposed in the country. Verma led the protest against Gandhi's arrest in Hardoi and was taken in custody along with five of his colleagues. All five, except Verma, apologised in writing to the British Government. As a result of his defiance, Verma was sentenced to four months in jail. He was again sent to jail by the British in 1932 for six months, and served another 15-month jail term in 1940 for his role in India's Independence Movement, during this period he was jailed in Hardoi and Badaun jails. In 1942, when Mahatma Gandhi launched the Quit India Movement, Verma promptly joined the movement and offered his arrest as symbol of support. The British sent him to Bareilly jail for 15 months including a period of house arrest for participating in the movement

== Political life after independence ==
After Independence, Verma was appointed by the interim government as Member of the Legislative Council from 1948 to 1952 from Hardoi constituency. In 1957, he decided to fight the elections for Second Legislative Assembly of Uttar Pradesh from Sandila constituency in Hardoi District for the Praja Socialist Party (PSP) under the leadership of Jayprakash Narayan. Verma defeated his nearest rival from Indian National Congress (INC) Aiza Rasool by more than 20,000 votes During his tenure as MLA from 1957 to 1962, he contributed to the development of the district; his most notable achievement was establishing the Cane Eye Hospital in Hardoi in 1958.

In 1962, Verma joined the INC and was an election candidate for the Third Legislative Assembly of Uttar Pradesh for the erstwhile Gauny-Gondwa constituency in Hardoi District. He defeated his nearest rival Rajendra Singh from Bharatiya Jana Sangh party by more than 5,000 votes and was elected as an MLA for the second time. During this tenure as MLA from 1962 to 1967, Verma continued his efforts towards the development of the district and established Ram Bajpai Memorial School in 1964 and CSN Degree College in 1965.

In 1967, Chaudhary Charan Singh, the Chief Minister of Uttar Pradesh, formed a political party called Bharatiya Kranti Dal and he invited Verma to join it. In 1969 UP Legislative Assembly Elections, Chaudhary Charan Singh asked Verma to contest the election in Mallawan constituency; he lost the election by 996 votes to Lalan Sharma of the INC After this election Verma decided not to contest elections due to his health issues but he continued to serve the people of Hardoi till his death in January 1979.

He was also appointed as Assistant District Scout Commissioner in 1953 and District Scout Commissioner in 1957. He held several other important appointments like President of Zilla Parishad, President of Uttar Pradesh Krishak Samaj, President of All India Krishak Samaj and Member of the Regional Transport Authority.

== Gallery ==
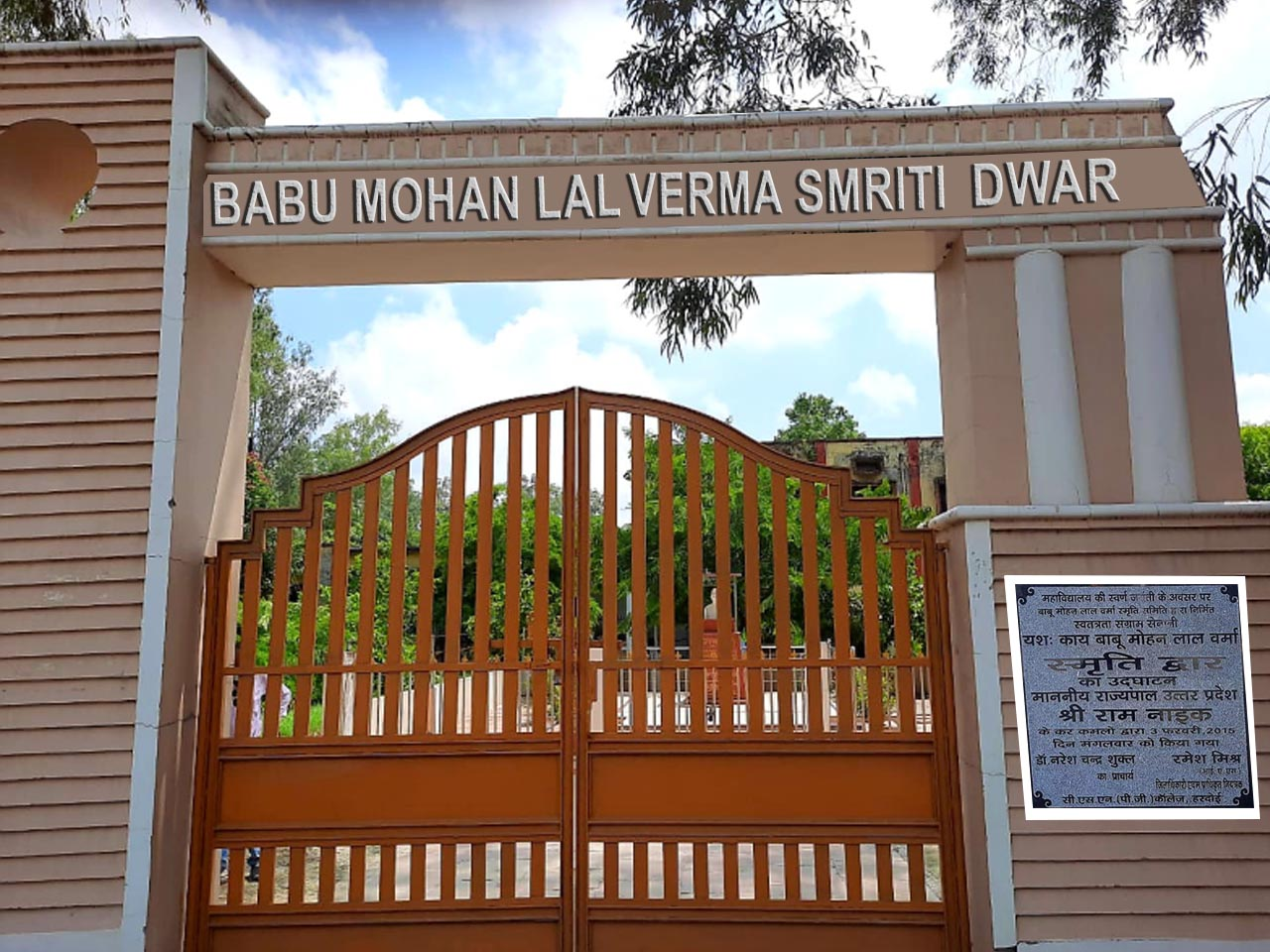
Memorial Gate in name of Mohan Lal Verma inaugurated by the Governor of UP, Ram Naik on 3 February 2015

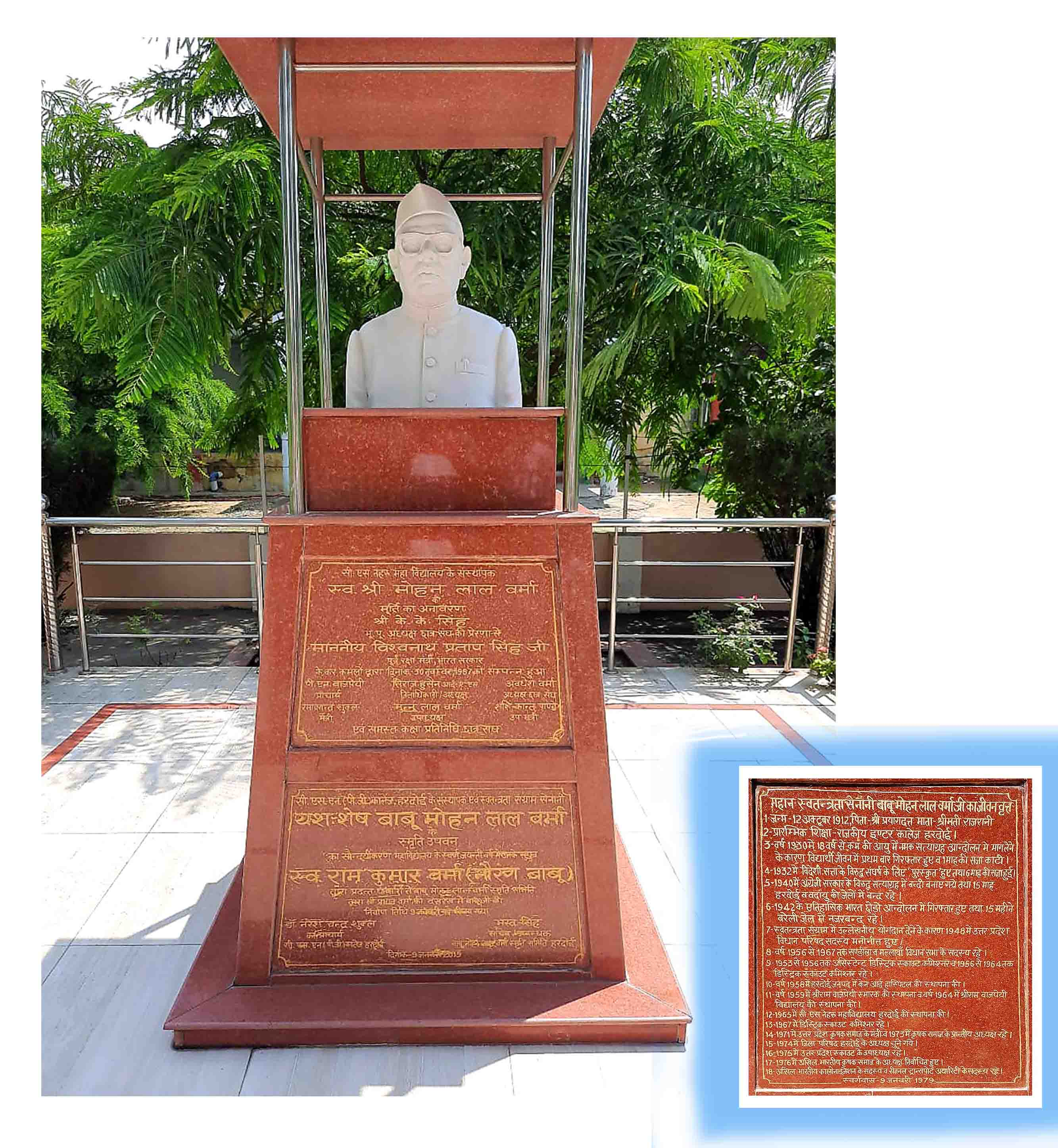
Verma's bust unveiled by Vishwanath Pratap Singh, ex- Prime Minister and Defence Minister India

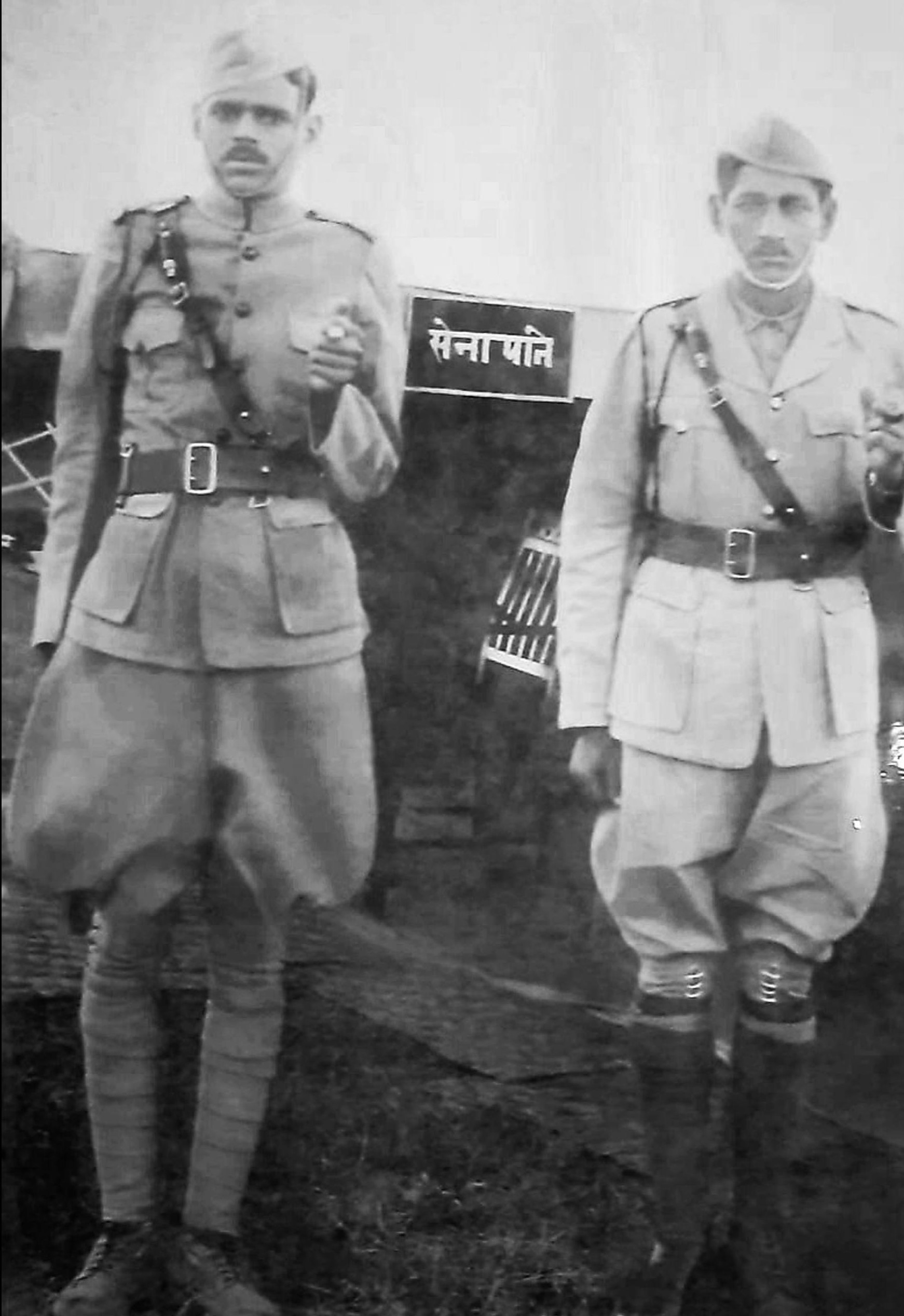
Young Mohan Lal Verma as captain of local unit of Congress Seva Dal with an unidentified colleague.

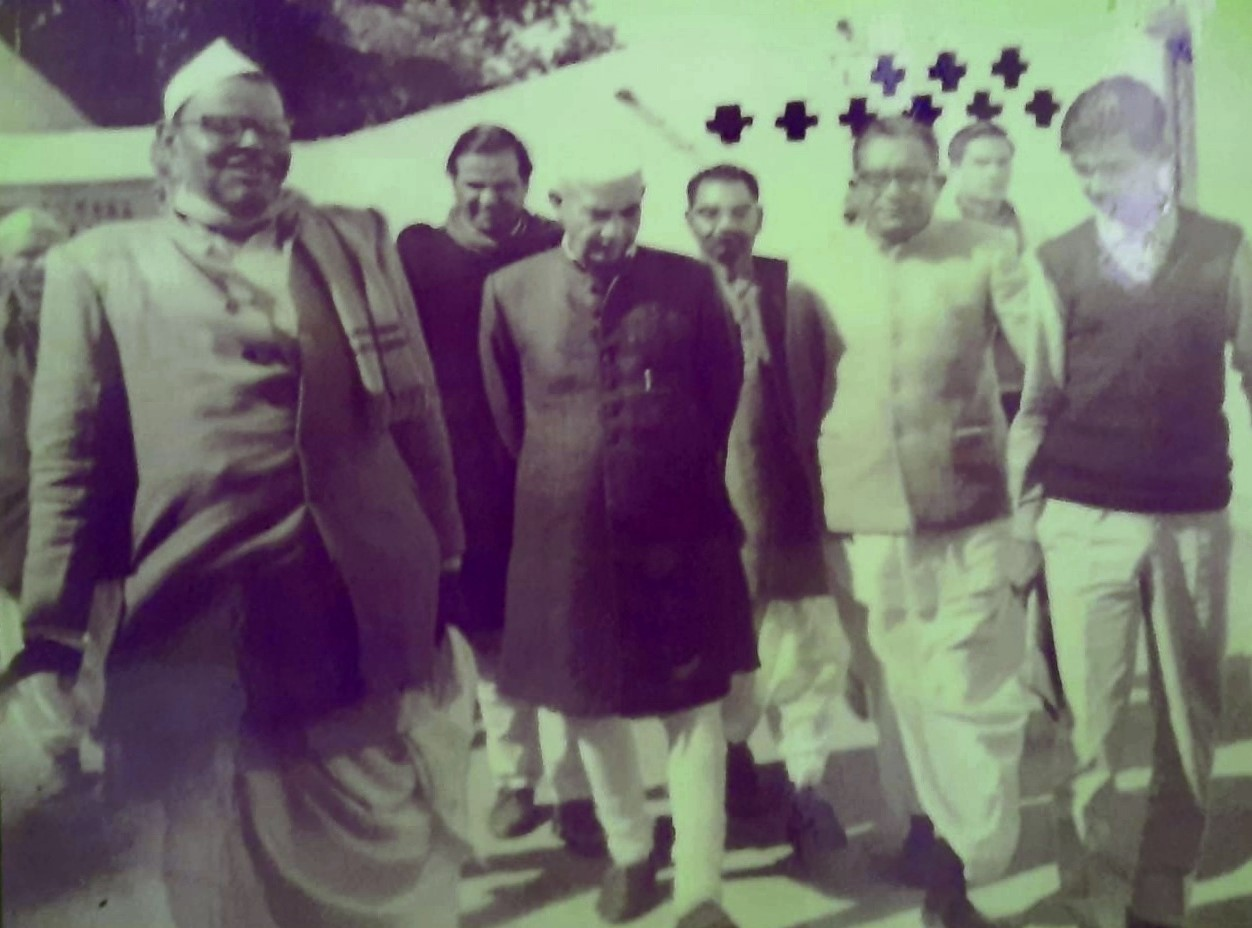
Verma with his friend and then Chief Minister of Uttar Pradesh (later Prime Minister of India), Chaudhary Charan Singh, during his visit to Hardoi

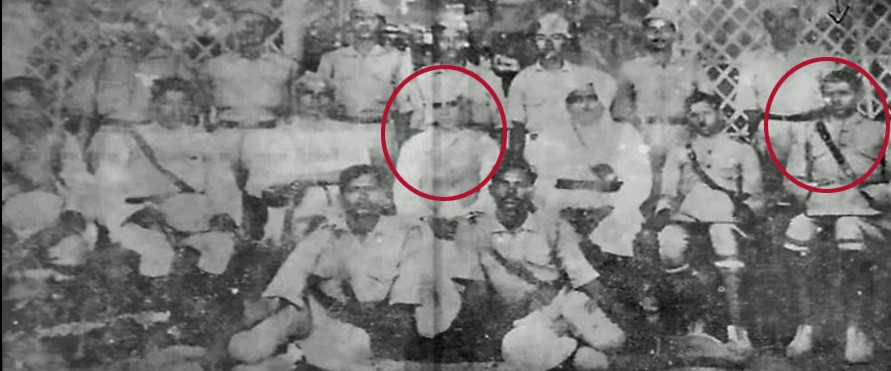
Congress Seva Dal 1932 Mohan Lal (middle row seated first from right) with Jawaharlal Nehru (seated center)

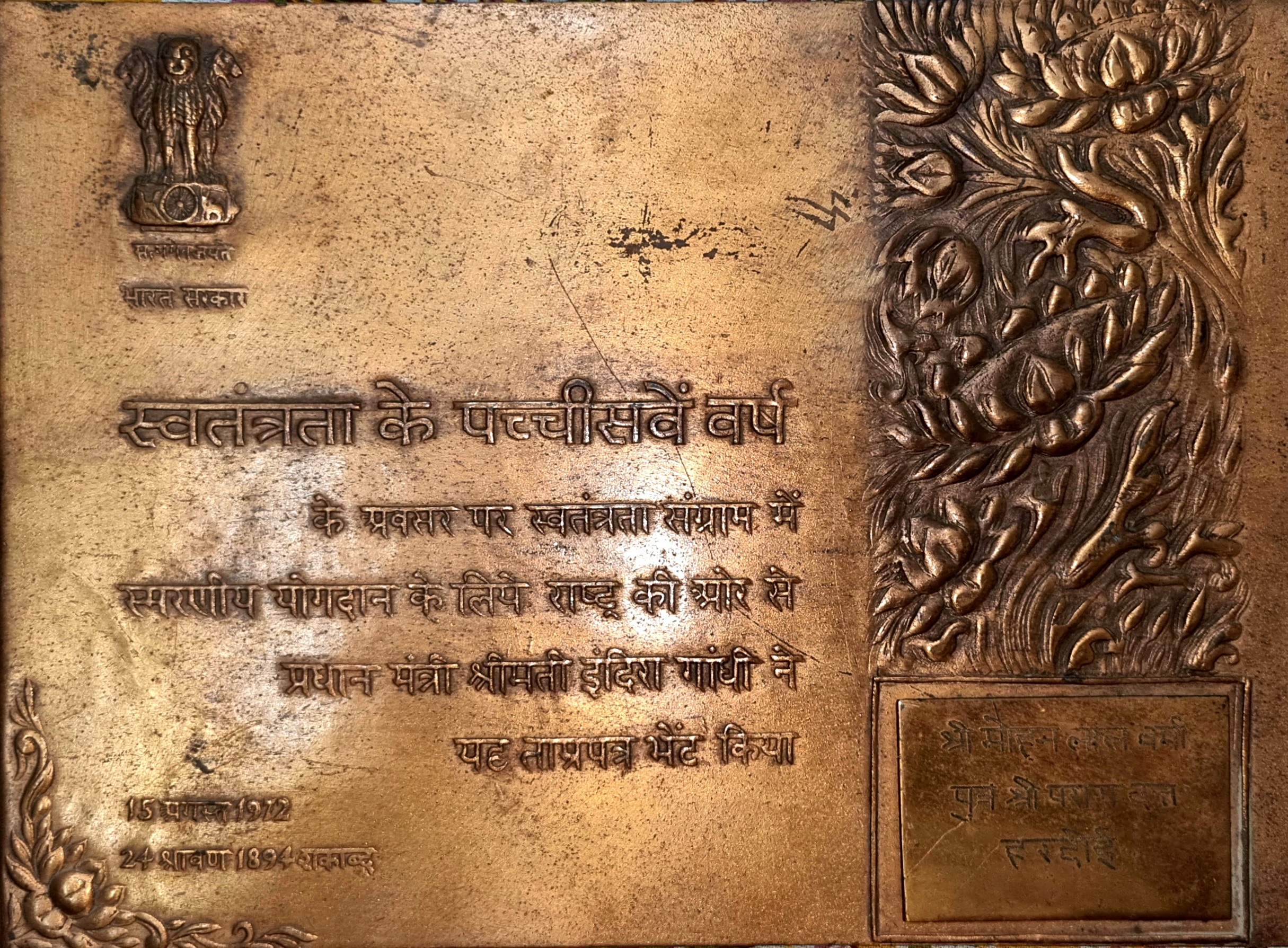
Mohanlal posthumously honoured with Freedom Fighter Tamprapatra 1972
