= Triloki Singh =

Indian politician

Member of Parliament (Rajya Sabha)
- In office 1967-1968, 1970-1980
- Constituency: Uttar Pradesh

Personal details
- Born: 10 March 1908
- Died: 30 January 1980 (aged 71)
- Party: Indian National Congress
- Other political affiliations: Praja Socialist Party

Triloki Singh (10 March 1908 – 30 January 1980) was a freedom fighter and an Indian politician. He had served a jail term exceeding twenty years during the freedom struggle. He was a member of the Rajya Sabha, the upper house of the Parliament of India representing Uttar Pradesh as a member of the Indian National Congress for 3 terms during 27 April 1967 to 2 April 1968, 3 April 1970 to 2 April 1976 and from 3 April 1976 till his death. He was earlier the Leader of the Opposition in the Uttar Pradesh Legislative Assembly from 1957 to 1962 as a member of the Praja Socialist Party. He was elected from the Lucknow East constituency.He sought cooperation from the prominent Congress party leader Nirmal Chandra Chaturvedi to formulate development schemes for Lucknow city.
