= Bareilly (disambiguation) =

Bareilly is a prominent city in Uttar Pradesh, India.

It may also mean any of the following:

== India ==
=== Bareilly ===
- History of Bareilly
- Bareilly district, India
- Bareilly division, India
- Bareilly (Assembly constituency)
- Bareilly Cantonment (Assembly constituency)
- Bareilly (Lok Sabha constituency)
- Hindu temples in Bareilly
- Bareilly Airport
- Bareilly College
- Bareilly Junction railway station
- Bareilly Metro
- Barelvi, a Sunni-Sufi movement founded in Bareilly
  - Ahmed Raza Khan Barelvi, Indian Islamic scholar, founder of the movement
    - Bareilly Sharif Dargah, his tomb in Bareilly
    - Dargah Tajushshariya, tomb of his great-grandson, situated near the above

== Elsewhere ==
- Breilly, a commune in Picardie, France

== See also ==
- Bareli (disambiguation)
- Raebareli, another city in Uttar Pradesh India
- Delhi–Bareilly Express
