= Mawai Kaziyan =

Indian Village

Mavai Kaziyan
- Village
- Location in Uttar Pradesh, India Mavai Kaziyan (India)
- Coordinates: 28.696463°N 79.398273°E
- Country: India
- State: Uttar Pradesh
- District: Bareilly

Government
  - MLA: Ataurrehman

Area
  - Total: 2.59 km^{2} (1.00 sq mi)
- Elevation: 278 m (912 ft)

Population (2011)
  - Total: 5,721
  - Density: 2,210/km^{2} (5,720/sq mi)

Languages
  - Official: Hindi, Urdu
- Time zone: UTC+5:30 (IST)
- PIN: Pin Code 243505
- Vehicle registration: UP 25
- Website: up.gov.in

Mavai Kaziyan is a village and also a Gram Panchayat located in Baheri, tehsil in Bareilly district in the northern Indian state of Uttar Pradesh. It is approximately 50 kilometres (31 mi) from Bareilly city, district headquarter. It is geographically located near the lower reaches of Gaula river. The Village 300 kilometres (186 mi) north of the state capital, Lucknow, and 300 kilometres (186 mi) east of the national capital, New Delhi.

== Demographic ==
According to Census 2011 information the location code or village code of Mavai Kaziyan village is 129317. The total geographical area of village is 327.27 hectares. Mavai Kaziyan has a total population of 5,721 peoples, out of which male population is 3,008 while female population is 2,713. Literacy rate of mavai kaziyan village is 38.04% out of which 45.15% males and 30.15% females are literate. There are about 877 houses in mavai kaziyan village.
