= Girdharpur =

- Town

- Location in Uttar Pradesh, India
- Coordinates: 28°42′51.60″N 79°27′46″E
- Country: India
- State: Uttar Pradesh
- District: Bareilly

Government
  - Gram-Pradhan: Mr Abdul Mateen
- Elevation: 200 m (660 ft)

Population (2011)
  - Total: 7,399

Languages
  - Official: Hindi
- Time zone: UTC+5:30 (IST)
- PIN: 243201
- Telephone code: +915822***
- Vehicle registration: UP 25
- Website: https://girdharpur.xyz/

Girdharpur is a village in Bareilly district of the Indian state of Uttar Pradesh. It is 3 kilometers away from State Highway 37 and lies within the coordinates 28°42'51.60"N & 79°27'46"E.

== Geography ==
Girdharpur River

Girdharpur is the largest village by population in the Baheri (Vidhan Sabha constituency) and Bareilly district with a total population of 7,399 people and 1,616 households

It is situated 8 kilometers away from sub-district headquarter Baheri and 42 kilometers away from district headquarter Bareilly, Girdharpur lies within the coordinates 28°42'51.60"N & 79°27'46"E and has an area of 243.27 hectares Broad up gramin bank mini branch in girdharpur near kabristan wali masjid

Girdharpur is well irrigated by canals and even blessed by a perennial river called Girdharpur River which flows throughout the year and irrigates the major portion of agricultural lands in the village. Girdharpur also have two ponds which are a source of fish.

== Connectivity ==
Girdharpur have no state run public transport service, people use privately run Tanga (carriage) and Three-wheelers for transport.

Buses run by School Authorities are the common mode of travel by Students of the town with around 6 to 7 buses picking and dropping students studying in the schools located most commonly in nearby Baheri town.

Mode of Travel	Nearest Boarding Station	Distance from Girdharpur
Railway Station	Richha Road (RR)	3 Kilometers
UPSRTC Bus Station	Richha Road	3 Kilometers
Airport (Domestic)	Pantnagar Airport	45 Kilometers
Airtport (International)	IGI Airport, Delhi	281 Kilometers

== Demographics ==
=== Population ===
As per provisional reports of Census India, population of Girdharpur in 2011 was 7,399; Total number of houses are 1,616 with 3,858 males and 3,541 females. Children below the age of 6 years are numbered 1,254. There are 243 Schedule Caste people in Girdharpur.

=== Literacy ===
According to 2011 census, Girdharpur has literacy rate of 61.04% which is below India's National literacy rate of 74.04% and also below the State Uttar Pradesh's literacy rate of 67.68%.

Particulars	Total	Male	Female
Total No. of Houses	1,616	-	-
Population	7,399	3,858	3,541
Children Below 6 Years	1,254	654	600
Schedule Caste	243	121	122
Literacy	61.04%	68.85%	52.53%
Total Workers	2,365	1,971	394
Main Worker	1,465	-	-
Marginal Worker	900	592	308

== Economy ==
Girdharpur has diverse Commerce like Petroleum retail, Rice industries, Garment Industry, Handicraft etc., but Agriculture is the main bread source for this small economy with people growing a variety of products like Wheat, Rice, Sugarcane, Spice and Vegetables.

Animal husbandry is also quite common since a decade, as a lot of folks are indulge in Poultry farming these days.

Girdharpur is self-reliant for its basic food requirements.

== Climate ==
Girdharpur experiences winter from November to February with pleasant windy days, clear skies and cool nights which makes it the most enjoyable time of the year. The day temperature hovers around 16 °C which drops to 8 °C at night for most of December and January, often dropping to 4 °C. On particular cold days, wind may appear to be very chilly due to the dryness of air. Rain is very expected in even in February.

Climate data for Girdharpur
Month	Jan	Feb	Mar	Apr	May	Jun	Jul	Aug	Sep	Oct	Nov	Dec	Year
Mean daily maximum °C (°F)	21.6 (70.9)	24.0 (75.2)	30.6 (87.1)	36.8 (98.2)	39.9 (103.8)	38.6 (101.5)	33.9 (93.0)	32.6 (90.7)	33.0 (91.4)	32.3 (90.1)	28.0 (82.4)	23.2 (73.8)	31.2 (88.2)
Mean daily minimum °C (°F)	8.3 (46.9)	10.4 (50.7)	15.2 (59.4)	20.9 (69.6)	25.1 (77.2)	27.0 (80.6)	26.1 (79.0)	25.8 (78.4)	24.4 (75.9)	19.3 (66.7)	12.7 (54.9)	9.3 (48.7)	18.7 (65.7)
Average precipitation mm (inches)	22.9 (0.90)	25.3 (1.00)	14.5 (0.57)	8.9 (0.35)	19.3 (0.76)	106.4 (4.19)	307.0 (12.09)	290.9 (11.45)	186.1 (7.33)	44.9 (1.77)	3.9 (0.15)	9.7 (0.38)	1,039.8 (40.94)
Source: India Meteorological Department (1901–2000)
