= Bareilly Lok Sabha constituency =

Lok Sabha Constituency in Uttar Pradesh

Coordinates: 28.37°N 79.42°E

Bareilly UP-25
- Lok Sabha constituency
- Interactive Map Outlining Bareilly Lok Sabha constituency

Constituency details
- Country: India
- Region: North India
- State: Uttar Pradesh
- Assembly constituencies: Meerganj; Bhojipura; Nawabganj; Bareilly; Bareilly Cantt.
- Established: 1952
- Reservation: None

Member of Parliament
- 18th Lok Sabha
- Incumbent Chhatrapal Singh Gangwar
- Party: Bharatiya Janata Party
- Elected year: 2024

Bareilly Lok Sabha constituency (Hindi pronunciation: [bəɾeːliː]) is one of the 80 Lok Sabha (parliamentary) constituencies in Uttar Pradesh state in northern India. It covers a part of Bareilly district.

== Assembly segments ==
Presently, Bareilly Lok Sabha constituency comprises five Vidhan Sabha (legislative assembly) segments. These are:

| No | Name | District | Member | Party | 2024 Lead |
|---|---|---|---|---|---|
| 119 | Meergenj | Bareilly | D. C. Verma | BJP | BJP |
| 120 | Bhojipura | Bareilly | Shazil Islam Ansari | SP | SP |
| 121 | Nawabganj | Bareilly | M. P. Arya | BJP | SP |
| 124 | Bareilly | Bareilly | Arun Kumar Saxena | BJP | BJP |
| 125 | Bareilly Cantt. | Bareilly | Sanjeev Agarwal | BJP | BJP |

== Members of Parliament ==
| Year | Member | Party |
|---|---|---|
| 1952 | Satish Chandra | Indian National Congress |
| 1957 | Satish Chandra | Indian National Congress |
| 1962 | Brij Raj Singh | Bharatiya Jana Sangh |
| 1967 | Brijbhushan Lal | Bharatiya Jana Sangh |
| 1971 | Satish Chandra | Indian National Congress |
| 1977 | Ram Murti | Janata Party |
| 1980 | Misaryar Khan | Janata Party (Secular) |
| 1981^ | Abida Ahmed | Indian National Congress |
| 1984 | Abida Ahmed | Indian National Congress |
| 1989 | Santosh Gangwar | Bharatiya Janata Party |
| 1991 | Santosh Gangwar | Bharatiya Janata Party |
| 1996 | Santosh Gangwar | Bharatiya Janata Party |
| 1998 | Santosh Gangwar | Bharatiya Janata Party |
| 1999 | Santosh Gangwar | Bharatiya Janata Party |
| 2004 | Santosh Gangwar | Bharatiya Janata Party |
| 2009 | Praveen Singh Aron | Indian National Congress |
| 2014 | Santosh Gangwar | Bharatiya Janata Party |
| 2019 | Santosh Gangwar | Bharatiya Janata Party |
| 2024 | Chhatrapal Singh Gangwar | Bharatiya Janata Party |

^bypoll

== Election results ==
=== General election 2024 ===
2024 Indian general elections: Bareilly
| Party | Candidate | Votes | % | ±% |
|---|---|---|---|---|
| BJP | Chhatrapal Singh Gangwar | 567,127 | 50.66 | ▼2.12 |
| SP | Praveen Singh Aron | 5,32,323 | 47.55 | ▲10.30 |
| NOTA | None of the Above | 6,260 | 0.56 | ▲0.20 |
| Margin of victory | | 34,804 | 3.11 | ▼12.55 |
| Turnout | | 11,19,558 | 58.18 | ▼1.25 |
| BJP hold | | Swing | ▼1.43 | |

=== General election 2019 ===
2019 Indian general elections: Bareilly
| Party | Candidate | Votes | % | ±% |
|---|---|---|---|---|
| BJP | Santosh Gangwar | 565,270 | 52.91 | +2.00 |
| SP | Bhagwat Saran Gangwar | 3,97,988 | 37.25 | +9.98 |
| INC | Praveen Singh Aron | 74,206 | 6.95 | −1.32 |
| NOTA | None of the Above | 3,824 | 0.36 | −0.30 |
| Margin of victory | | 1,67,282 | 15.66 | −7.98 |
| Turnout | | 10,68,342 | 59.43 | −1.74 |
| BJP hold | | Swing | +2.00 | |

=== General election 2014 ===
2014 Indian general elections: Bareilly
| Party | Candidate | Votes | % | ±% |
|---|---|---|---|---|
| BJP | Santosh Kumar Gangwar | 518,258 | 50.91 | +20.92 |
| SP | Ayesha Islam | 2,77,573 | 27.27 | +16.85 |
| BSP | Umesh Gautam | 1,06,049 | 10.42 | −15.37 |
| INC | Praveen Singh Aron | 84,213 | 8.27 | −23.04 |
| CPI | Massarat Warsi | 7,639 | 0.75 | +0.75 |
| NOTA | None of the Above | 6,737 | 0.66 | +0.66 |
| Margin of victory | | 2,40,685 | 23.64 | +22.32 |
| Turnout | | 10,17,891 | 61.17 | +10.81 |
| BJP gain from INC | | Swing | +19.60 | |

=== General election 2009 ===
2009 Indian general elections: Bareilly
| Party | Candidate | Votes | % | ±% |
|---|---|---|---|---|
| INC | Praveen Singh Aron | 220,976 | 31.31 | |
| BJP | Santosh Gangwar | 2,11,638 | 29.99 | |
| BSP | Islam Sabir Ansari | 1,81,996 | 25.79 | |
| SP | Bhagwat Saran Gangwar | 73,549 | 10.42 | |
| IND. | Rakesh Agarwal | 9,220 | 1.31 | |
| Margin of victory | | 9,338 | 1.32 | |
| Turnout | | 7,05,734 | 50.36 | |
| INC gain from BJP | | Swing | | |

== See also ==
- Bareilly district
- List of constituencies of the Lok Sabha
