= List of educational institutions in Kanpur =

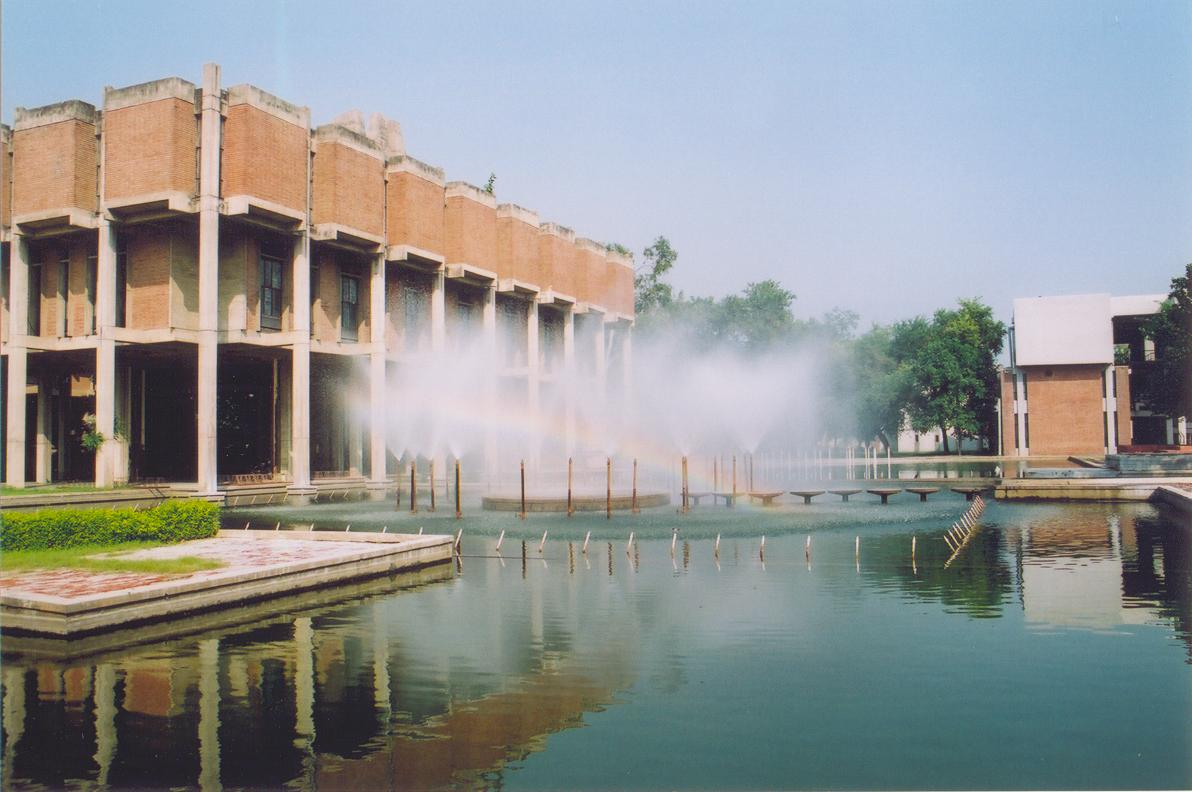
PK Kelkar Library, IIT Kanpur, designed by Achyut Kanvinde

This is a list of educational institutions in Kanpur, India.

== Technological institutes ==
- Indian Institute of Technology Kanpur (IIT Kanpur)
- Dr. Ambedkar Institute of Technology for Handicapped (AITH Kanpur)
- Institute of Company Secretaries of India (ICSI kanpur)
- Institute of Chartered Accountants of India (ICAI Kanpur)
- National Sugar Institute (NSI)
- University Institute of Engineering and Technology, Kanpur University (UIET Kanpur or IET Kanpur)
- Uttar Pradesh Technical University (UPTU)
- SRMS College of Engineering and Technology, Kanpur Lucknow Highway (SRMS CET)

== Medical and allied colleges ==
- Ganesh Shankar Vidyarthi Memorial Medical College (GSVM)

== Universities ==
Auditorium of Kanpur University

- Chhatrapati Shahu Ji Maharaj University (CSJMU), formerly Kanpur University (KU)
- Chandra Shekhar Azad University of Agriculture and Technology
- Harcourt Butler Technical University

== Others ==
- DAV College, Kanpur
- VSSD College, Kanpur
- Christ Church College, Kanpur
- Halim Muslim PG College
- BND College, Kanpur
