= 2017 Budget of Uttar Pradesh =

2017 Uttar Pradesh Budget 2017-18
- Submitted: 11 July 2017
- Submitted by: Rajesh Agarwal, Finance Minister
- Submitted to: Vidhan Sabha, Lucknow, Uttar Pradesh Assembly
- Country: India
- Party: Bharatiya Janata Party
- Total revenue: ₹3.77 lakh crore (US$45 billion)
- Total expenditures: ₹3.84 lakh crore (US$45 billion)
- Deficit: ₹42967.86 crore
- Website: Uttar Pradesh Budget

Rajesh Agarwal, State Finance minister of Uttar Pradesh announced the Uttar Pradesh Budget for 2017-18 on 11 July 2017. The size of the budget presented is ₹3 lakh 84 thousand 659 million 71 lakh (384659.71 crore). It can be read as rupees. This is 10.9% more than the 2016-17 budget. The fiscal deficit of ₹42,967.86 crore, which is 2.97% of the gross state domestic product, is well below the target of 3% set under the Fiscal Responsibility and Budget Management (FRBM) Act.

== Key points ==
- Total Budget: ₹3.84 lakh crore (US$45 billion)
- Revenue Expenditure:
- Capital Expenditure:
- Fiscal Deficit: ₹42,967.86 crore

== Allocations ==
- Includes new schemes of ₹55 thousand 781 crore 96 lakh (₹55,781.96 crore) in the budget.
- The goal of achieving 10 percent growth rate in the next 5 years.

=== For farmers ===
- An arrangement of ₹36,000 crore for the payment of crop loan to small and marginal farmers.
- An arrangement of ₹10 crore for Pandit Deendayal Upadhyay Kisan Samrudhi Yojana for improving the rugged, barren and waterlogged areas in the rural areas and providing treatment and livelihood to the allotted land to agricultural laborers.
- An arrangement of ₹19 crores 56 lakhs for increasing the availability of Vermicompost to increase the yield of crops.
- An arrangement of ₹10 crores 41 lakhs for the sprinkler for irrigation in excessive, critical and semi-critical development blocks.
- An arrangement of ₹125 crore for setting up of Solar Photovoltaic Irrigation Pump under Alternative Energy Management.
- An arrangement of ₹200 crore for the construction of link roads and ₹250 crore for maintenance of sugarcane farmers for easy access to the market.
- An arrangement of ₹10 crore for establishment of Centers of Excellence for research on crops in Agriculture and Technology University Kanpur, Faizabad, Meerut, Banda and Allahabad.
- In place of the closed cooperative sugar mill Pipriach of the state, a new sugar mill of 3,500 tonne (TCD) capacity will be extended to 5 thousand TCD and for the establishment of co-generation plant 273 million 75 lakh Arrangement of rupees
- A new sugar mill of 5 thousand (TCD) capacity at the place of closed cooperative sugar mill Mundarwa, which can be extended up to 7 thousand 500 TCD and ₹270 crore for establishment of co-generation plant.
- Arrangement of ₹33.33 crore for the completion of this year's co-operative sugar mill.
- Budgetary arrangement of ₹84 crores to increase the crushing capacity of cooperative sugar mill ramala to 2 thousand 750 (TCD) to 5 thousand TCD.
- An arrangement of ₹25 crores for hybrid vegetable production and management to increase the income of small and marginal farmers.
- The establishment of 20 new Krishi Vigyan Kendras in 20 districts with the support of Government of India is proposed.

=== Infrastructure development ===
Budget provision of ₹288 crore for metro rail projects in the state.

- Arrangement of ₹598 crores 65 lacs for channelization and strengthening of roads.
- Arrangement for linking villages with permanent links and for small bridges, ₹451.88 million.
- Arrangement of ₹71.11 crore for connecting the district headquarters with 4 lane routes.
- An arrangement of ₹3,972 crores for the maintenance and discharge of roads.
- Arrangement of ₹50 crore for establishment of UP State Road Development Corporation.
- ₹300 crore for special plan of Purvanchal and new schemes of 200 crores for special schemes of Bundelkhand are proposed.
- An arrangement of ₹300 crore for Pandit Deendayal Upadhyay Nagar Vikas Yojana.
- Arrangement of ₹385 crores for the Chief Minister's Urban Slum Development and Slum Development Program.
- Under the Pradhanmantri Awas Yojana, work of ₹3,000 crore has been proposed for housing for all (urban mission).
- Deendayal Antyodaya Yojana: ₹218 crores 75 lacs for National Urban Livelihood Mission.
- Budget provision of ₹30 crores for Pandit Deendayal Upadhyaya Solar Street Lite Scheme.
- Arrangement for construction and strengthening of air stripes at the identified sites and ₹400 crore for land acquisition.
- An arrangement of ₹40 crores for establishment of Kanji House / Animal Shelter Homes under 'Kanha Gaushala and Bhesara Animal Shelter Scheme'.
- An arrangement of ₹8 thousand crore for the construction, scrutiny and strengthening of roads under Central Road Fund Scheme.
- An arrangement of ₹251 crores 67 lacs for the routes to be created in 07 districts of the state connected with the Nepal border.
- A provision of ₹252 crore for road construction works under the proposed 'Uttar Pradesh Core Network Project' with the help of World Bank and ₹202 crore for road construction with assistance from Asian Development Bank.
- An arrangement of ₹185 crores 69 lakhs for the construction of bridges, rail overhead and downstream bridges on various categories of roads in the state.

Industry and employment

- An arrangement of ₹20 crore for the implementation of the Industrial Investment and Employment Promotion Policy, 2017.
- Arrangement of ₹5 crores for establishment of "Special Investment Board" for Industrial

=== Investment promotion ===
- An arrangement of ₹10 crore for establishment of single window clearance.
- An arrangement of ₹5 crore for establishment of incubators in Lucknow.
- ₹10 crore arrangement for Vishwakarma Shram Samman scheme

=== For students ===
- An arrangement of ₹100 crores for the allotment of free school bags of students of primary and upper primary schools run by the Basic Education Council.
- An arrangement of ₹300 crore for providing a pair of shoes, two pair of pair and one sweater to students of primary and upper primary schools of the Basic Education Council.
