= Paiga =

Bareilly
- Metropolis
- Nicknames: City Of Jhumka, Ala Hazrat, Nath Nagri, Zari Nagri, Shiv Nagari, City of Surma
- Location within Uttar Pradesh Location within India
- Coordinates: 28.364°N 79.415°E
- Country: India
- state: Uttar Pradesh
- District: Bareilly District
- Established: 1657

Government
  - MP: Mr. Varun Gandhi (Bharatiya Janta Party)
  - MLA: Mr. Chhatra Pal Gangwar

Area
  - Total: 235 km^{2} (91 sq mi)
- Elevation: 268 m (879 ft)

Population
  - Total: 3,718
- Demonym: Barelvi / Sunni Sufi / Bareillians
- Time zone: IST
- PIN codes: 243203
- Area code: 243203
- Vehicle registration: UP-25
- Website: bareilly.nic.in

Paiga is a village situated in Block- Damkhoda, Tehsil- Baheri, District- Bareilly, Uttar Pradesh, India. It is located 238 km (148 mi) from the state capital at Lucknow and 273 km (170 mi) from the capital of India.
