= Daiya Bojh =

Daiya Bojh is a village situated in the Baheri Mandal of Bareilly District in Uttar Pradesh, India. It is located about 46.65 km from the district headquarters in Bareilly.
