= D. C. Verma =

Indian politician

Member of the Uttar Pradesh Legislative Assembly
- Incumbent
- Assumed office March 2022
- Constituency: Meerganj Assembly constituency

Personal details
- Party: Bharatiya Janata Party
- Education: Veterinary College, Mathura
- Occupation: Politician

D. C. Verma (born 1977) is an Indian politician from Uttar Pradesh. He is a member of the Uttar Pradesh Legislative Assembly from Meerganj Assembly constituency in Bareilly district. He won the 2022 Uttar Pradesh Legislative Assembly election representing the Bharatiya Janata Party.

== Early life and education ==
Verma is from Bareilly city, Bareilly district, Uttar Pradesh. He is the son of PL Verma. He completed his master's degree in veterinary science in 2001 at IVRI, Izzatnagar, Bareilly. Earlier, he did his bachelor's degree in 1996 at Veterinary College, Mathura, which is affiliated with WW. His wife Namita Verma is a principal in the Government Mahila Polytechnic, CB Ganj, Bareilly.

== Career ==
Verma won from Meerganj Assembly constituency representing Bharatiya Janata Party in the 2022 Uttar Pradesh Legislative Assembly election. He polled 116,435 votes and defeated his nearest rival, Sultan Baig of the Samajwadi Party, by a margin of 32,840 votes.
