= Brij Bhushan Lal =

Indian politician

Member of Parliament, Lok Sabha
- In office 1967-1971
- Preceded by: Brij Raj Singh
- Succeeded by: Satish Chandra
- Constituency: Bareilly, Uttar Pradesh

Personal details
- Born: 14 February 1905 Dhaunra, Bareilly, United Provinces of Agra and Oudh, British India(present-day Uttar Pradesh, India)
- Party: Bharatiya Jana Sangh
- Spouse: Bishan Pyari Devi

Brij Bhushan Lal was an Indian politician. He was elected to the Lok Sabha, the lower house of the Parliament of India from the Bareilly, Uttar Pradesh as a member of the Bharatiya Jana Sangh.
