= Virendra Singh (Uttar Pradesh politician) =

Indian politician

Honourable Virendra Singh

MLA, Legislative Assembly of Uttar Pradesh
- In office March 2012 – March 2017
- Preceded by: Constituency established
- Succeeded by: Rajesh Kumar Mishra
- Constituency: Bithari Chainpur
- In office May 2007 – March 2012
- Preceded by: Shahlin Islam
- Succeeded by: Rajesh Agarwal
- Constituency: Bareilly Cantt.

Personal details
- Born: 8 August 1959 (age 67) Bareilly district
- Died: 30 March 2021 Bareilly
- Party: Bahujan Samaj Party
- Spouse: Vinoda Devi (wife)
- Children: 2 sons
- Parent: Niranjan Singh (father)
- Education: Bareilly College
- Profession: Farmer, businessperson & politician

Virendra Singh was an Indian politician, and a member of the Bahujan Samaj Party. He was a member of the Sixteenth Legislative Assembly of Uttar Pradesh (2012-2017) in India. He represented the Bithari Chainpur constituency.

== Early life and education ==
Virendra Singh was born in Bareilly district. He attended the Bareilly College and attained a Master of Arts degree.

== Political career ==
In the initial phase, he rose up from grass root level and became Block Pramukh from Bithari Chainpur, popularly called as Pramukh sahab till his landsliding victory in 2007 assembly elections. Virendra Singh has been a MLA for two terms. He represented the Bithari Chainpur constituency and is a member of the Bahujan Samaj Party political party.

He lost his seat in the 2017 Uttar Pradesh Assembly election to Rajesh Kumar Mishra "Pappu Bhartoul" of the Bharatiya Janata Party.

== Posts held ==
#	From	To	Position	Comments
01	2012	2017	Member, 16th Legislative Assembly	
02	2007	2012	Member, 15th Legislative Assembly	

== See also ==
- Bareilly Cantt. (Assembly constituency)
- Bithari Chainpur (Assembly constituency)
- Sixteenth Legislative Assembly of Uttar Pradesh
- Uttar Pradesh Legislative Assembly
