= Yzeux =

- Commune
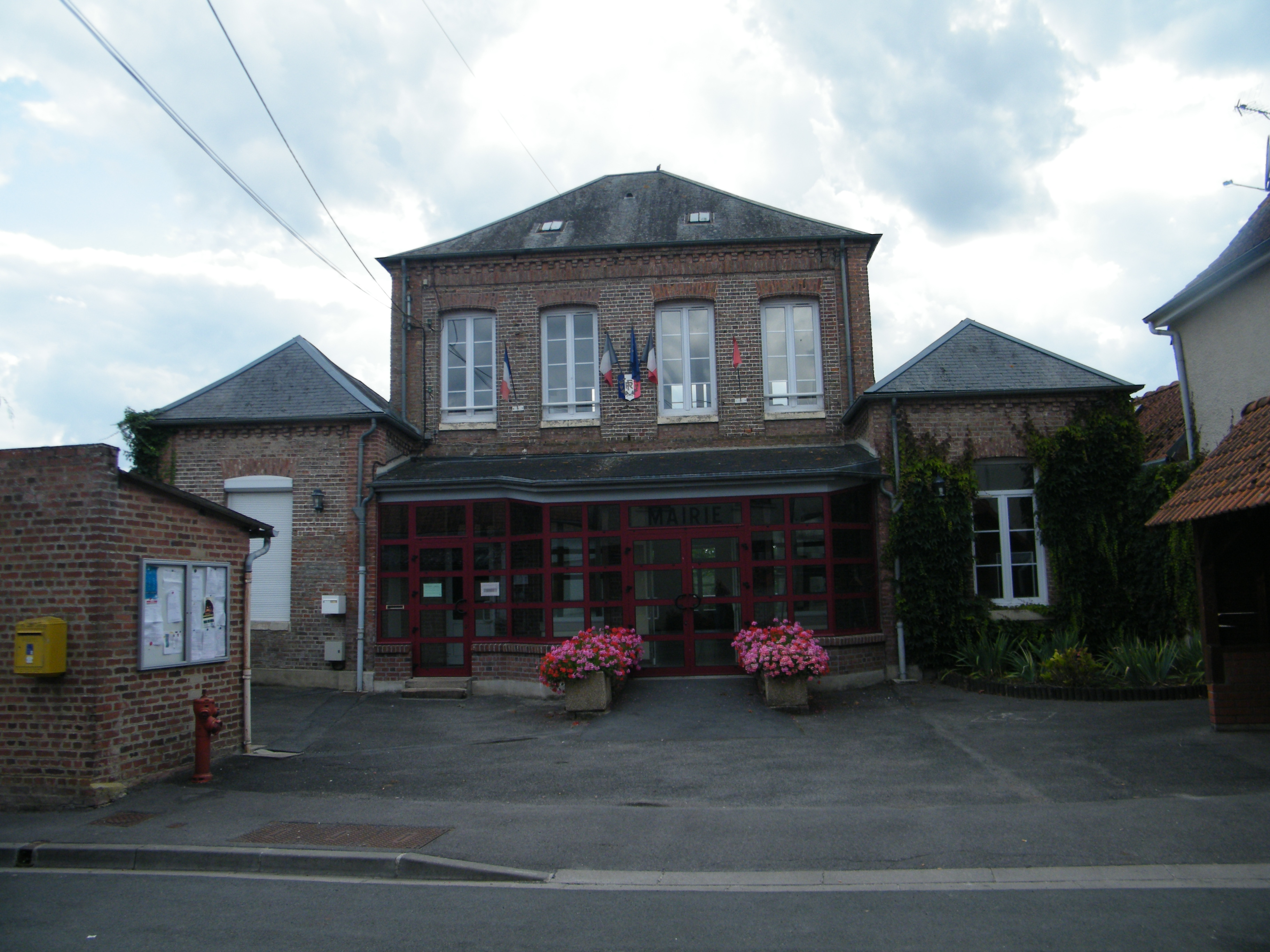
- The town hall in Yzeux
- Location of Yzeux
- Location within France Location within Hauts-de-France
- Coordinates: 49°58′32″N 2°06′36″E
- Country: France
- Region: Hauts-de-France
- Department: Somme
- Arrondissement: Amiens
- Canton: Ailly-sur-Somme
- Intercommunality: Nièvre et Somme

Government
  - Mayor (2020–2026): Jean-Marie Leblanc
- Area^{1}: 5.05 km^{2} (1.95 sq mi)
- Elevation: 16 m (52 ft)
- Highest elevation: 85 m (279 ft)
- Lowest elevation: 10 m (33 ft)
- Population (2023): 264
  - Density: 52.3/km^{2} (135/sq mi)
- Time zone: UTC+01:00 (CET)
  - Summer (DST): UTC+02:00 (CEST)
- INSEE/Postal code: 80835 /80310
- ^{1} French Land Register data, which excludes lakes, ponds, glaciers > 1 km^{2} (0.386 sq mi or 247 acres) and river estuaries.

Yzeux (French pronunciation: [izø]) is a commune in the Somme department in Hauts-de-France in northern France.

== Geography ==
Yzeux is 10 miles(16 km) northwest of Amiens, on the D259 road and by the banks of the river Somme.

== Population ==
Historical population

Year	Pop.	±% p.a.
1793	293	—
1821	321	+0.33%
1846	341	+0.24%
1872	282	−0.73%
1901	159	−1.96%
1926	126	−0.93%
1946	119	−0.29%
1962	110	−0.49%
1968	107	−0.46%

Year	Pop.	±% p.a.
1975	124	+2.13%
1982	142	+1.96%
1990	200	+4.37%
1999	220	+1.06%
2007	255	+1.86%
2012	270	+1.15%
2017	267	−0.22%
2023	264	−0.19%

Source: EHESS (1793-1999) and INSEE

== See also ==
- Communes of the Somme department
