= Meerganj Assembly constituency =

Constituency of the Uttar Pradesh legislative assembly in India

Meerganj
- Constituency No. 119 for the Uttar Pradesh Legislative Assembly

Constituency details
- Country: India
- Region: North India
- State: Uttar Pradesh
- District: Bareilly
- Total electors: 363,673 (2022)
- Reservation: None

Member of Legislative Assembly
- 18th Uttar Pradesh Legislative Assembly
- Incumbent Dr. D.C. Verma
- Party: Bhartiya Janta Party
- Elected year: 2022

Meerganj Assembly constituency is one of the 403 constituencies of the Uttar Pradesh Legislative Assembly, India. It is a part of the Bareilly district and one of the five assembly constituencies in the Bareilly Lok Sabha constituency. First election in this assembly constituency was held in 2012 after the "Delimitation of Parliamentary and Assembly Constituencies Order, 2008" was passed and the constituency was formed in 2008. The constituency is assigned identification number 119.

== Wards / Areas ==
Extant of Meerganj Assembly constituency is Meerganj Tehsil. There are two blocks in this constituency, Fatehgarh west and Meerganj.

== Members of the Legislative Assembly ==
#	Term	Name	Party	From	To	Days	Comments	Ref
01	16th Vidhan Sabha	Sultan Baig	Bahujan Samaj Party	Mar-2012	Mar-2017	-	-	
02	17th Vidhan Sabha	D. C. Verma	Bharatiya Janata Party	Mar-2017	Mar-2022	-	-	–
03	18th Vidhan Sabha	D. C. Verma	Bharatiya Janata Party	Mar-2022	Incumbent	-	-	–

== Election results ==
=== 2027 ===
2027 Uttar Pradesh Legislative Assembly election: Meerganj
Party	Candidate	Votes	%	±%
INDIA				
NDA				
BSP				
NOTA	None of the above			
Majority				
Turnout				
gain from		Swing		

=== 2022 ===
2022 Uttar Pradesh Legislative Assembly election: Meerganj
Party	Candidate	Votes	%	±%
BJP	D. C. Verma	116,435	50.98	−0.76
SP	Sultan Baig	83,955	36.76	
BSP	Bhanu Pratap Singh	19,189	8.4	−17.42
INC	Mohd Ilyas	5,288	2.32	−15.25
NOTA	None of the above	1,162	0.51	−0.33
Majority		32,480	14.22	−11.7
Turnout		228,387	67.25	+2.51
BJP hold		Swing		

=== 2017 ===
2017 General Elections: Meerganj
Party	Candidate	Votes	%	±%
BJP	D. C. Verma	108,789	51.74	
BSP	Sultan Baig	54,289	25.82	
INC	Narendra Pal Singh	36,938	17.57	
MD	Bhanu Pratap Singh	2,267	1.08	
NOTA	None of the above	1,749	0.84	
Majority		54,500	25.92	
Turnout		210,276	64.74	
BJP gain from BSP		Swing		

=== 2012 ===
2012 General Elections: Meerganj
Party	Candidate	Votes	%	±%
BSP	Sultan Baig	57,446	31.23	−
BJP	D. C. Verma	49,525	26.93	−
SP	Haji Zahid Hussain	35,299	19.19	−
	Remainder 11 candidates	41,649	22.64	−
Majority		7,921	4.31	−
Turnout		183,919	66.39	−
BSP hold		Swing		

== See also ==
- Bareilly Lok Sabha constituency
- Bareilly district
- Sixteenth Legislative Assembly of Uttar Pradesh
- Uttar Pradesh Legislative Assembly
- Vidhan Bhawan
