= Chhatrapal Singh Gangwar =

Former Minister of State for Revenue of Uttar Pradesh

Member of Parliament, Lok Sabha
- Incumbent
- Assumed office 4 June 2024
- Preceded by: Santosh Gangwar
- Constituency: Bareilly

Member of the 17th Uttar Pradesh Assembly
- In office March 2017 – March 2022
- Preceded by: Ataurrehman
- Succeeded by: Ataurrehman
- Constituency: Baheri

Personal details
- Born: Chhatrapal Singh; 20 January 1956 (age 70) Damkhoda, Uttar Pradesh, India
- Party: Bharatiya Janata Party
- Spouse: Ranjana Singh
- Children: 2
- Education: Mahatma Jyotiba Phule Rohilkhand University
- Occupation: Farmer
- Profession: Politician

Chhatrapal Singh, also known as Chhatrapal Singh Gangwar (Hindi pronunciation: [t͡ʃʰət̪ɾəpaːl sɪŋgʱ gə̃gʋaːɾ]), is an Indian politician currently serving as Member of Parliament in Lok Sabha, and former minister of state for revenue of Uttar Pradesh. He was a member of the Seventeenth Legislative Assembly of Uttar Pradesh. He represented the Baheri Assembly constituency of Uttar Pradesh and is a member of the Bharatiya Janata Party.

== Early life ==
Chhatrapal Singh Gangwar was born on 20 January 1956 in Damkhoda, Bareilly, India, to a Hindu family of Ramlal Singh Gangwar. He completed his master's degree in 1979 at Mahatma Jyotiba Phule Rohilkhand University, Bareilly. He is a member of Kurmi caste.

== Political career ==
Chhatrapal Singh Gangwar was a 17th Uttar Pradesh Assembly member from the Baheri Assembly constituency from March 2017 to March 2022 (represented it once earlier also). also member from 2007 to 2012 as BJP MLA from Baheri Assembly Constituency. In 2024, Bhartiya Janta Party announced his name as a Candidate for Lok Sabha for Bareilly Lok Sabha constituency. He successfully won the election and became the MP.

== Posts held ==
| # | From | To | Position | Comments |
|---|---|---|---|---|
| 01 | March 2017 | March 2022 | Member, 17th Uttar Pradesh Assembly | |
| 01 | 4 June 2024 | Present | Member, 18th Lok Sabha | |

== See also ==
- Bharatiya Janata Party
- 17th Uttar Pradesh Assembly
- Baheri Assembly constituency
