= Baheri Assembly constituency =

Constituency of the Uttar Pradesh legislative assembly in India

Baheri
- Constituency No. 118 for the Uttar Pradesh Legislative Assembly

Constituency details
- Country: India
- Region: North India
- State: Uttar Pradesh
- District: Bareilly
- Established: 1956
- Total electors: 289,882 (2012)
- Reservation: None

Member of Legislative Assembly
- 18th Uttar Pradesh Legislative Assembly
- Incumbent Ataurrehman
- Party: Samajwadi Party
- Elected year: 2022
- Preceded by: Chhatrapal Singh Gangwar

Baheri Assembly constituency is one of the 403 constituencies of the Uttar Pradesh Legislative Assembly, India. It is a part of the Bareilly district and one of the five assembly constituencies in the Pilibhit Lok Sabha constituency. First election in this assembly constituency was held in 1957 after the "DPACO (1956)" (delimitation order) was passed in 1956. After the "Delimitation of Parliamentary and Assembly Constituencies Order" was passed in 2008, the constituency was assigned identification number 118.

== Wards / Areas ==
Extent of Baheri Assembly constituency is KCs Baheri, Rai Nawada, Banjaria, Richha, Baheri NPP, Richha NP & Faridpur NP of Baheri Tehsil.

== Members of the Legislative Assembly ==
#	Term	Name	Party	From	To	Days	Comments	Ref
01	01st Vidhan Sabha	-	-	Mar-1952	Mar-1957	1,849	Constituency not in existence	0
02	02nd Vidhan Sabha	Ram Murti	Indian National Congress	Apr-1957	Mar-1962	1,800	-	
03	03rd Vidhan Sabha	Ram Murti	Indian National Congress	Mar-1962	Mar-1967	1,828	-	
04	04th Vidhan Sabha	Ram Murti	Indian National Congress	Mar-1967	Apr-1968	402	-	
05	05th Vidhan Sabha	Shafiq Ahmad Khan	Bharatiya Kranti Dal	Feb-1969	Mar-1974	1,832	-	
06	06th Vidhan Sabha	Ram Murti	Indian National Congress (Organisation)	Mar-1974	Apr-1977	1,153	-	
07	07th Vidhan Sabha	Shafiq Ahmad Khan	Indian National Congress	Jun-1977	Feb-1980	969	-	
08	08th Vidhan Sabha	Amba Prasad	Independent	Jun-1980	Mar-1985	1,735	-	
09	09th Vidhan Sabha	Amba Prasad	Indian National Congress	Mar-1985	Nov-1989	1,725	-	
10	10th Vidhan Sabha	Manzoor Ahmad	Independent	Dec-1989	Apr-1991	488	-	
11	11th Vidhan Sabha	Harish Chandra	Bharatiya Janata Party	Jun-1991	Dec-1992	533	-	
12	12th Vidhan Sabha	Manzoor Ahmad	Samajwadi Party	Dec-1993	Oct-1995	693	-	
13	13th Vidhan Sabha	Harish Chandra Gangwar	Bharatiya Janata Party	Oct-1996	May-2002	1,967	-	
14	14th Vidhan Sabha	Manzoor Ahmad	Samajwadi Party	Feb-2002	May-2007	1,902	-	
15	15th Vidhan Sabha	Chhatrapal Singh Gangwar	Bharatiya Janata Party	May-2007	Mar-2012	1,762	-	
16	16th Vidhan Sabha	Ataurrehman	Samajwadi Party	Mar-2012	Mar-2017	-	-	
17	17th Vidhan Sabha	Chhatrapal Singh Gangwar	Bharatiya Janata Party	May-2017	2022		-	
18	18th Vidhan Sabha	Ataurrehman	Samajwadi Party	Mar-2022	Incumbent			

== Election results ==
=== 2027 ===
2027 Uttar Pradesh Legislative Assembly election: Baheri
Party	Candidate	Votes	%	±%
INDIA				
NDA				
BSP				
NOTA	None of the above			
Majority				
Turnout				
gain from		Swing		

=== 2022 ===
2022 Uttar Pradesh Legislative Assembly election: Baheri
Party	Candidate	Votes	%	±%
SP	Ataur Rehman	124,145	46.67	+20.91
BJP	Chhatrapal Singh Gangwar	120,790	45.41	+1.48
BSP	Aaseram Gangwar	15,814	5.95	−20.69
NOTA	None of the above	1,172	0.44	−0.16
Majority		3,355	1.26	−16.03
Turnout		266,003	72.59	+0.64
SP gain from BJP		Swing		

2017 Assembly Elections: Baheri
Party	Candidate	Votes	%	±%
BJP	Chhatrapal Singh Gangwar	108,846	43.93	
BSP	Naseem Ahmad	66,009	26.64	
SP	Ataur Rehman	63,841	25.76	
MD	Ubaidullah Khan	2,658	1.07	
NOTA	None of the above	1,479	0.6	
Majority		42,837	17.29	
Turnout		247,785	71.95	
BJP gain from SP		Swing		

== See also ==
- Bareilly Lok Sabha constituency
- Pilibhit district
- Sixteenth Legislative Assembly of Uttar Pradesh
- Uttar Pradesh Legislative Assembly
- Vidhan Bhawan
