= Bareli (disambiguation) =

Bareli (also spelled Bareilly) is a city in Uttar Pradesh, India

Bareli may refer to:

- Bareli or Eastern Bhil, a sub-group of Bhil languages
  - Pauri Bareli language
  - Rathwi Bareli language

== See also ==
- Bareilly (disambiguation)
- Baraily, a town in Madhya Pradesh, India
