= Bithari Chainpur Assembly constituency =

Constituency of the Uttar Pradesh legislative assembly in India

Bithari Chainpur
- Constituency No. 123 for the Uttar Pradesh Legislative Assembly

Constituency details
- Country: India
- Region: North India
- State: Uttar Pradesh
- District: Bareilly
- Total electors: 303,541 (2012)
- Reservation: None

Member of Legislative Assembly
- 18th Uttar Pradesh Legislative Assembly
- Incumbent Dr. Raghvendra Sharma
- Party: Bhartiya Janta Party
- Elected year: 2022

Bithari Chainpur Assembly constituency is one of the 403 constituencies of the Uttar Pradesh Legislative Assembly, India. It is a part of the Bareilly district and one of the five assembly constituencies in the Aonla Lok Sabha constituency. First election in this assembly constituency was held in 2012 after the "Delimitation of Parliamentary and Assembly Constituencies Order, 2008" was passed and the constituency was formed in 2008. The constituency is assigned identification number 123.

== Wards / Areas ==
Extent of Bithari Chainpur Assembly constituency is KC Kiyara, Bithari Chainpur, Thiriya Nizabat Khan NP & Kargaina (CT) of Bareilly Tehsil; KCs Bisharatganj, Ballia & Bisharat-ganj NP of Aonla Tehsil.

== Members of the Legislative Assembly ==
#	Term	Name	Party	From	To	Days	Comments	Ref
01	16th Vidhan Sabha	Virendra Singh	Bahujan Samaj Party	March 2012	March 2017	–	–	
02	17th Vidhan Sabha	Rajesh Kumar Mishra	Bhartiya Janata Party	March 2017	March 2022	–	–	
03	18th Vidhan Sabha	Raghvendra Sharma	Bhartiya Janata Party	March 2022	Present	–	–	

== Election results ==
=== 2027 ===
2027 Uttar Pradesh Legislative Assembly election: Bithari Chainpur
Party	Candidate	Votes	%	±%
INDIA				
NDA				
BSP				
NOTA	None of the above			
Majority				
Turnout				
gain from		Swing		

=== 2022 ===
2022 Uttar Pradesh Legislative Assembly election: Bithari Chainpur
Party	Candidate	Votes	%	±%
BJP	Dr. Raghavendra Sharma	115,417	46.53	▲5.5
SP	Agam Kumar Maurya	99,576	40.15	▲7.43
BSP	Ashish Patel	22,727	9.16	▼13.52
AIMIM	Taufique Pradhani	2,858	1.15	
NOTA	None of the above	1,283	0.52	▼0.62
Majority		15,841	6.38	▼1.93
Turnout		248,030	62.92	▼1.89
BJP hold		Swing		

=== 2017 ===
2017 Uttar Pradesh Legislative Assembly Election: Bithari Chainpur
Party	Candidate	Votes	%	±%
BJP	Rajesh Kumar Mishra	96,397	41.03	
SP	Veer Pal Singh Yadav	76,886	32.72	
BSP	Virendra Singh	53,286	22.68	
NOTA	None of the above	2,647	1.14	
Majority		19,511	8.31	
Turnout		234,958	64.81	

=== 2012 ===
16th Vidhan Sabha: 2012 General Elections

2012 General Elections: Bithari Chainpur
Party	Candidate	Votes	%	±%
BSP	Virendra Singh	55,972	26.87	–
SP	Dharmendra Kumar	52,557	25.23	–
IEMC	Brijendra Singh	29,872	14.34	–
	Remainder 24 candidates	69,926	33.59	–
Majority		3,415	1.64	–
Turnout		208,327	68.63	–
BSP hold		Swing		

== See also ==
- Aonla Lok Sabha constituency
- Bareilly district
- Sixteenth Legislative Assembly of Uttar Pradesh
- Uttar Pradesh Legislative Assembly
- Vidhan Bhawan
