= Rajesh Kumar Mishra (born 1967) =

Indian politician based in Uttar Pradesh

- Pappu Bhartaul

Member (MLA) of Uttar Pradesh Legislative Assembly
- In office 2017–2022
- Preceded by: Virendra Singh
- Succeeded by: Raghvendra Sharma
- Constituency: Bithari Chainpur

Personal details
- Born: June 30, 1967 (age 59) Bhartaul village, Bareilly district, Uttar Pradesh
- Party: Bharatiya Janata Party
- Spouse: Sunita Mishra
- Parent: Bhojadatt Mishra (father)
- Education: National Institute of Open Schooling
- Profession: Politician

Rajesh Kumar Mishra, also known as Pappu Bhartaul (born 30 June 1967) is an Indian politician from Bharatiya Janata Party (BJP). He has been an MLA twice in Uttar Pradesh. He represented Bithari Chainpur seat of Bareilly district as an MLA from 2017 to 2022.

== Posts held ==
#	From	To	Position	Comments
01	2017	2022	Member, 17th Legislative Assembly	
