= Sanjeev Agarwal =

Indian politician

Member of the Uttar Pradesh Legislative Assembly
- Incumbent
- Assumed office March 2022
- Preceded by: Rajesh Agarwal
- Constituency: Bareilly Cantonment

Personal details
- Born: 1962 or 1963 (age 63–64)
- Party: Bharatiya Janata Party
- Education: Bareilly College, (M.Com, 1984)
- Occupation: Politician
- Profession: Businessperson

Sanjeev Agarwal is an Indian politician and a member of the 18th Legislative Assembly of Uttar Pradesh representing Bareilly Cantonment of Uttar Pradesh. He is a member of the Bharatiya Janata Party and is also the State Co-treasurer of the party.

== Personal life ==
Sanjeev Agarwal was born to Krishna Autar Agarwal and hails from Bareilly Cantonment of Uttar Pradesh. He is a postgraduate and did his Master of Commerce from Bareilly College in 1984. Agarwal is a businessman and a clearing and forwarding agent in HeidelbergCement India Ltd.

== Political career ==
In the 2022 Uttar Pradesh Legislative Assembly election, Agarwal represented Bharatiya Janata Party as a candidate from Bareilly Cantonment constituency and went on to defeat Samajwadi Party's Supriya Aron by 9389 votes, succeeding own party member Rajesh Agarwal in the process.
