= Argœuves =

Commune in Hauts-de-France, France

- Commune
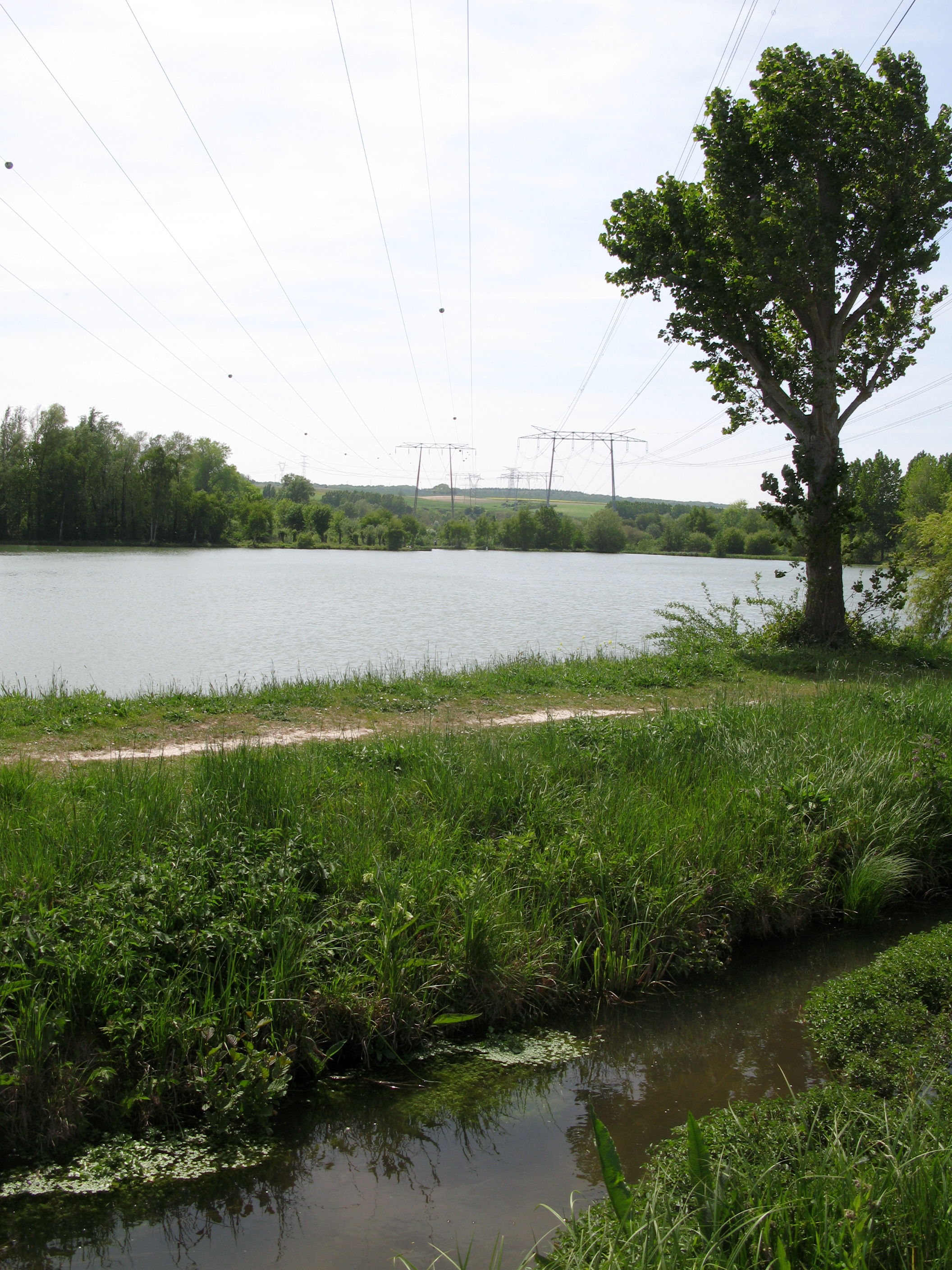
- Argœuves marsh

- Coat of arms
- Location of Argœuves
- Location within France Location within Hauts-de-France
- Coordinates: 49°55′51″N 2°13′39″E
- Country: France
- Region: Hauts-de-France
- Department: Somme
- Arrondissement: Amiens
- Canton: Ailly-sur-Somme
- Intercommunality: CC Nièvre Somme

Government
  - Mayor (2020–2026): François Gourguechon
- Area^{1}: 10.21 km^{2} (3.94 sq mi)
- Elevation: 17 m (56 ft)
- Highest elevation: 74 m (243 ft)
- Lowest elevation: 12 m (39 ft)
- Population (2023): 543
  - Density: 53.2/km^{2} (138/sq mi)
- Time zone: UTC+01:00 (CET)
  - Summer (DST): UTC+02:00 (CEST)
- INSEE/Postal code: 80024 /80470
- ^{1} French Land Register data, which excludes lakes, ponds, glaciers > 1 km^{2} (0.386 sq mi or 247 acres) and river estuaries.

Argœuves (French pronunciation: [aʁɡœv]; Picard: Ardjeuve) is a commune in the Somme department in Hauts-de-France in northern France.

== Geography ==
The commune is situated 4 miles (6 km) north of Amiens on the D191 and 1 mile (2 km) from the junction of the N1 and A16 autoroute. The river Somme is 1 mile (2 km) away.

== Population ==
Historical population
Year	Pop.	±% p.a.
1968	498	—
1975	524	+0.73%
1982	592	+1.76%
1990	561	−0.67%
1999	543	−0.36%
2007	561	+0.41%
2012	539	−0.80%
2017	542	+0.11%
2023	543	+0.03%
Source: INSEE

== See also ==
- Communes of the Somme department
