= Supriya Aron =

Indian politician

Mayor of Bareilly
- In office 2006–2011

Personal details
- Born: 17 March 1960 (age 66)
- Party: Samajwadi Party
- Spouse: Praveen Singh Aron
- Education: Bharatiya Vidya Bhavan
- Profession: Politician

Supriya Aron is an Indian social worker, politician, former mayor of Bareilly, Uttar Pradesh, India, and a member of the Samajwadi Party. She is the wife of Praveen Singh Aron, a Former Member of the Lok Sabha.

== Education ==
Supriya Aron did a master of arts from Maharaj Singh Degree College, Saharanpur. She holds a Diploma in Journalism from Bharatiya Vidya Bhavan, New Delhi, India.

== Career ==
Supriya Aron started her career with Indian National Congress along with his husband, Praveen Singh Aron. In 2006, she contested for the post of Mayor in Bareilly on a Congress ticket and won.

Supriya was one of the 50 women candidates Indian National Congress announced as a part of its "Ladki Hoon, Lad Sakti Hoon" campaign.

In January 2022, just before the 18th Uttar Pradesh Assembly election, Supriya Aron left Indian National Congress and joined Samajwadi Party along with her husband, Praveen Singh Aron.

In the 2022 Uttar Pradesh Legislative Assembly election, Supriya represented Samajwadi Party as a candidate from the Bareilly Cantonment constituency and lost to Sanjeev Agarwal of the Bharatiya Janata Party by 9389 votes.

== See also ==
- Samajwadi Party
- 18th Uttar Pradesh Assembly
- Uttar Pradesh Legislative Assembly
- Bareilly Cantonment Assembly constituency
