= Bareilly Cantonment Assembly constituency =

Constituency of the Uttar Pradesh legislative assembly in India

Bareilly Cantonment
- Constituency No. 125 for the Uttar Pradesh Legislative Assembly

Constituency details
- Country: India
- Region: North India
- State: Uttar Pradesh
- District: Bareilly
- Total electors: 288,754 (2012)
- Reservation: None

Member of Legislative Assembly
- 18th Uttar Pradesh Legislative Assembly
- Incumbent Sanjeev Agarwal
- Party: Bharatiya Janata Party
- Elected year: 2022

Bareilly Cantt. Assembly constituency is one of the 403 constituencies of the Uttar Pradesh Legislative Assembly, India. It is a part of the Bareilly district and one of the five assembly constituencies in the Bareilly Lok Sabha constituency. First election in this assembly constituency was held in 1957 after the "DPACO (1956)" (delimitation order) was passed in 1956. After the "Delimitation of Parliamentary and Assembly Constituencies Order" was passed in 2008, the constituency was assigned identification number 125.

== Wards/Areas ==
Extent of Bareilly Cantt. Assembly constituency is Bareilly (CB), Ward Nos. 1, 2, 5, 6, 8 to 11, 16, 17, 20, 21, 25, 27, 33, 34, 35, 38, 40, 42 to 45, 50, 52, 53, 54 & 57 to 60 in Bareilly (M Corp.) of 4 Bareilly Tehsil.

== Members of the Legislative Assembly ==
Year	Member	Party
1957	Mohammad Hussain	Indian National Congress
1962	Mohammad Hussain	Indian National Congress
1967	Rama Ballabh	Bharatiya Jana Sangh
1969	Ashfaq Ahmad	Indian National Congress
1974	Badam Singh	Bharatiya Jana Sangh
1977	Ashfaq Ahmad	Indian National Congress
1980	Ashfaq Ahmad	Indian National Congress (I)
1985	Raffiq Ahmed	Indian National Congress
1989	Praveen Singh Aron	Janata Dal
1991	Islam Sabir Ansari	Indian National Congress
1993	Praveen Singh Aron	Samajwadi Party
1996	Ashfaq Ahmed	Samajwadi Party
2002	Shazil Islam Ansari	Independent
2007	Virendra Singh	Bahujan Samaj Party
2012	Rajesh Agarwal	Bharatiya Janata Party
2017	Rajesh Agarwal	Bharatiya Janata Party
2022	Sanjeev Agarwal	Bharatiya Janata Party

== Election results ==
=== 2027 ===
2027 Uttar Pradesh Legislative Assembly election: Bareilly Cantonment
Party	Candidate	Votes	%	±%
INDIA				
NDA				
BSP				
NOTA	None of the above			
Majority				
Turnout				
gain from		Swing		

=== 2022 ===
2022 Uttar Pradesh Legislative Assembly election: Bareilly Cantt.
Party	Candidate	Votes	%	±%
BJP	Sanjeev Agarwal	98,931	50.43	▲2.21
SP	Supriya Aron	88,163	44.94	
BSP	Anil Kumar Balmiki	3,370	1.72	▼6.04
INC	Mohd. Islam Ansari	2,280	1.16	▼40.15
NOTA	None of the above	687	0.35	▼0.23
Majority		10,768	5.49	▼1.42
Turnout		196,168	51.79	▼1.7
BJP hold		Swing		

=== 2017 ===
2017 Uttar Pradesh Legislative Assembly election: Bareilly Cantt.
Party	Candidate	Votes	%	±%
BJP	Rajesh Agarwal	88,441	48.22	
INC	Mujahid Hassan Khan	75,777	41.31	
BSP	Rajendra Prasad Gupta	14,239	7.76	
NOTA	None of the above	1,061	0.58	
Majority		12,664	6.91	
Turnout		183,430	53.49	
BJP hold		Swing		

=== 2012 ===
2012 Uttar Pradesh state assembly election: Bareilly Cantt.
Party	Candidate	Votes	%	±%
BJP	Rajesh Agarwal	51,893	33.71	
SP	Fahim Sabir Ansari	32,944	21.40	
IEMC	Anees Ahmad Khan	24,353	15.82	
INC	Supriya Aron	16,310	10.59	
BSP	Ram Gopal Misra	15,871	10.31	
JKP(R)	Rakesh Kashyap	3,360	2.18	
Majority		18,949	12.31	
Turnout		153,942	53.31	
BJP gain from BSP		Swing		

== See also ==
- Bareilly district
- Bareilly Lok Sabha constituency
- Sixteenth Legislative Assembly of Uttar Pradesh
- Uttar Pradesh Legislative Assembly
- Vidhan Bhawan
