= Saisseval =

- Commune
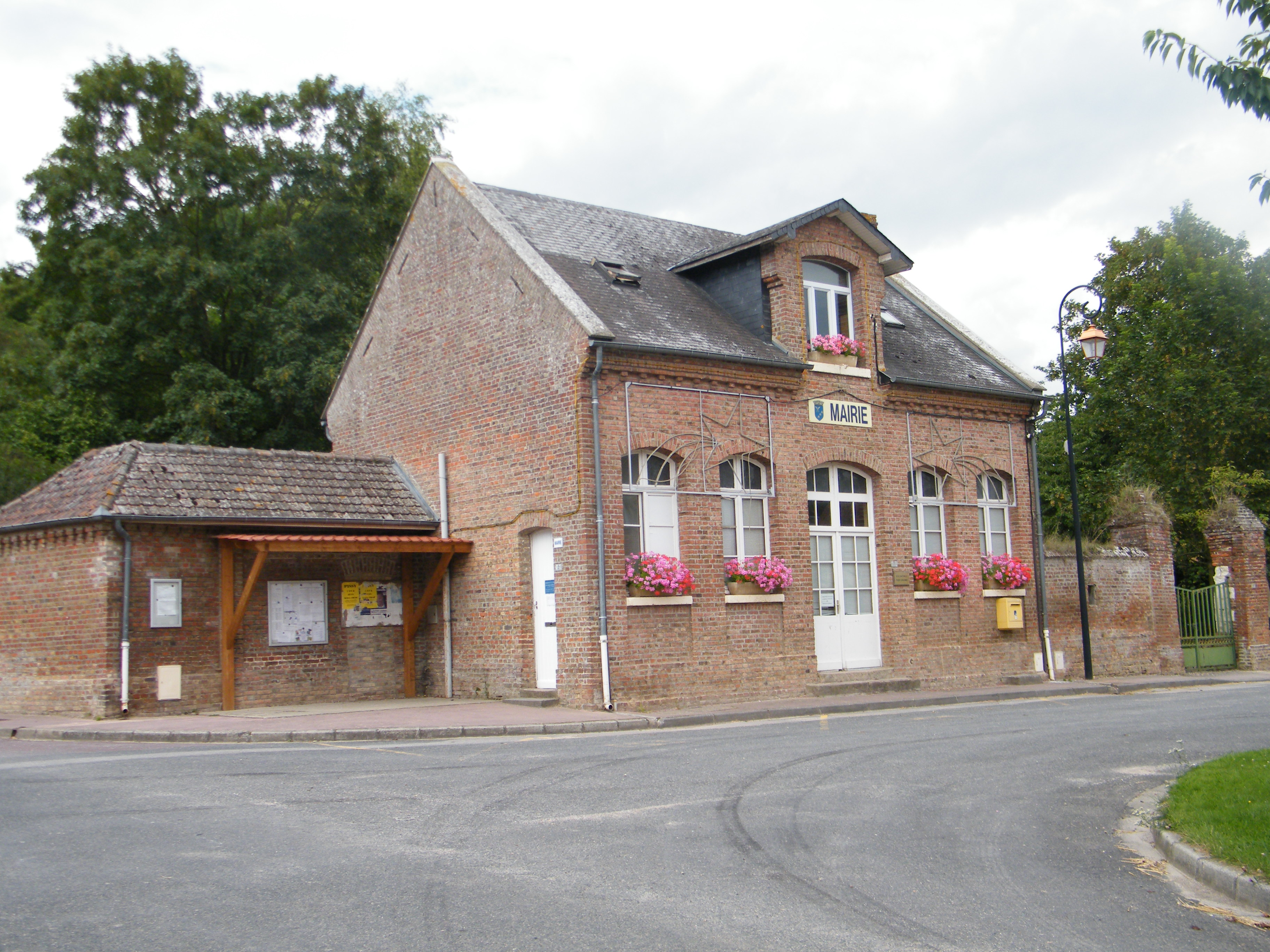
- The town hall in Saisseval

- Coat of arms
- Location of Saisseval
- Location within France Location within Hauts-de-France
- Coordinates: 49°53′43″N 2°06′48″E
- Country: France
- Region: Hauts-de-France
- Department: Somme
- Arrondissement: Amiens
- Canton: Ailly-sur-Somme
- Intercommunality: CC Nièvre et Somme

Government
  - Mayor (2023–2026): Vincent Louette
- Area^{1}: 7.32 km^{2} (2.83 sq mi)
- Elevation: 47 m (154 ft)
- Highest elevation: 119 m (390 ft)
- Lowest elevation: 50 m (160 ft)
- Population (2023): 263
  - Density: 35.9/km^{2} (93.1/sq mi)
- Time zone: UTC+01:00 (CET)
  - Summer (DST): UTC+02:00 (CEST)
- INSEE/Postal code: 80723 /80540
- ^{1} French Land Register data, which excludes lakes, ponds, glaciers > 1 km^{2} (0.386 sq mi or 247 acres) and river estuaries.

Saisseval (French pronunciation: [sɛsval]; Picard: Saisevo) is a commune in the Somme department in Hauts-de-France in northern France.

== Geography ==
Saisseval is situated 7 miles (11 km) west of Amiens, on the D211e road

== Population ==
Historical population
| Year | Pop. | ±% p.a. |
|---|---|---|
| 1968 | 183 | — |
| 1975 | 175 | −0.64% |
| 1982 | 182 | +0.56% |
| 1990 | 223 | +2.57% |
| 1999 | 230 | +0.34% |
| 2007 | 220 | −0.55% |
| 2012 | 234 | +1.24% |
| 2017 | 239 | +0.42% |
| 2023 | 263 | +1.61% |
Source: INSEE

== See also ==
- Communes of the Somme department
