= Shri Ram Murti Smarak College of Engineering and Technology Unnao =

Engineering college in Unnao, India

- Motto: Sanskrit: सिद्धिर्भवति कर्मजा
- Motto in English: Success is born out of action or accomplishment arises from effort.
- Type: Private Engineering College
- Established: 2011
- Founder: Dev Murti
- Parent institution: SRMS Trust
- Affiliations: Dr A P J Abdul Kalam Technical University
- Location: Village: Ashakhera Kushari, 35 Km on Lucknow-Kanpur Highway, Unnao, Uttar Pradesh (UP), India; 26.627436°N 80.725397°E
- Colours: Maroon and Blue
- Website: www.srms.ac.in/cetunnao

Shri Ram Murti Smarak College of Engineering and Technology (SRMSCET) Unnao, also known as SRMS CET Unnao or SRMS CET Lucknow, is a private, unaided engineering college that is part of SRMS Institutions. It is situated at 35 km on the Luckno-Kanpur Highway, in Village Ashakhera-Kushari, Unnao, Uttar Pradesh, India. The college was founded in memory of the late Shri Ram Murti Ji, and it is currently managed and run by SRMS Trust. It offers undergraduate courses leading to a Bachelor of Technology degree in engineering.

The college and of its all courses are approved by the All India Council for Technical Education (AICTE), New Delhi, and affiliated to Dr. A.P.J. Abdul Kalam Technical University (AKTU), Lucknow. Dr. A. P. J. Abdul Kalam Technical University was formerly known as Uttar Pradesh Technical University (UPTU), Lucknow. The college's institution code with AKTU is 745.

== History ==
The college was established in 2011 by SRMS Trust Lucknow to provide education and research in the field of engineering education in Lucknow, Unnao, and the Kanpur region. The college received approval from AICTE to run B.Tech. courses. The first class of B.Tech. students started in 2011.

== Academic Programs ==
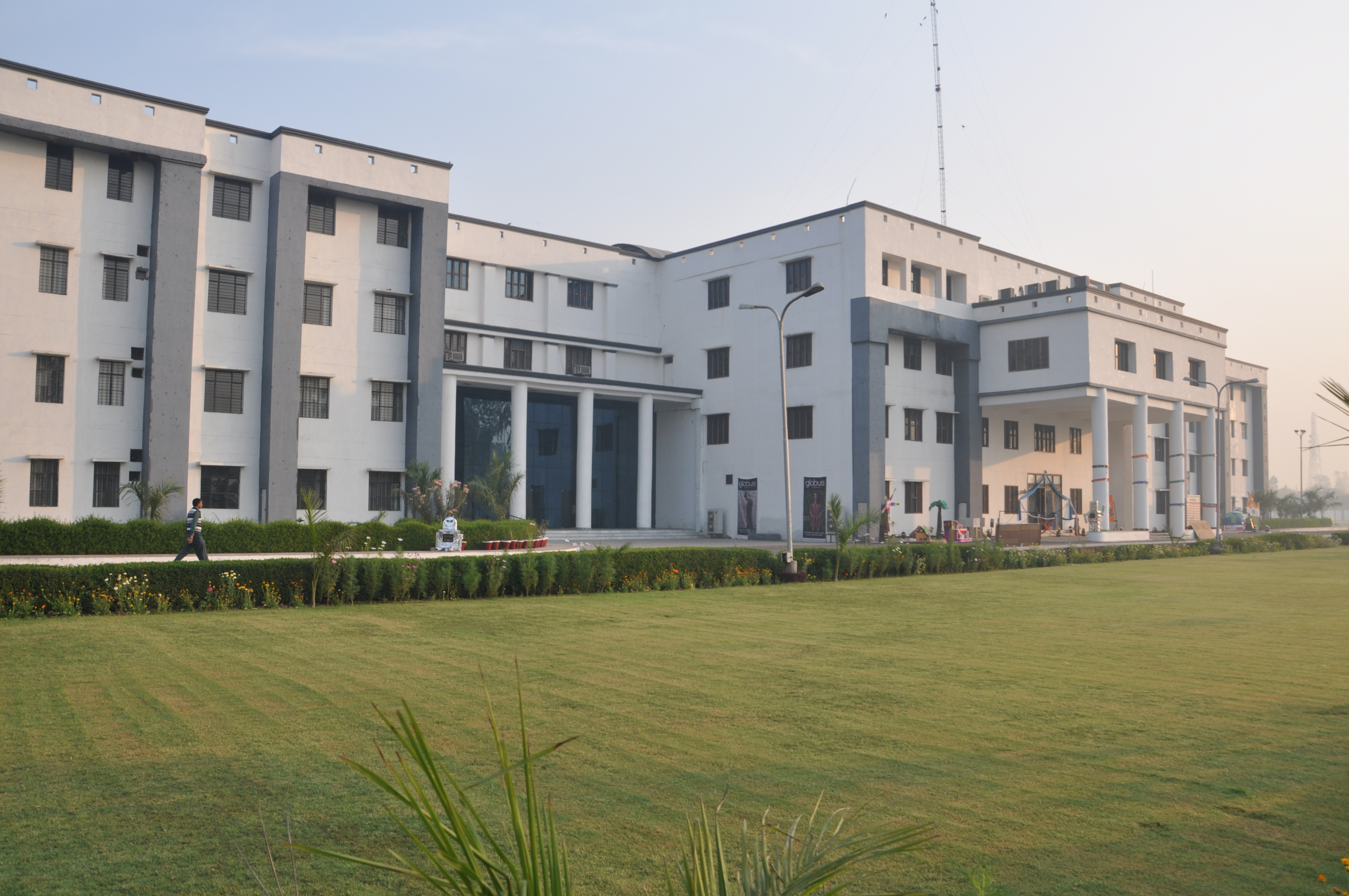
Campus view

The college offers following undergraduate engineering courses:

- Bachelor of Technology in Computer Science and Engineering (B. Tech in CSE)
- Bachelor of Technology in Mechanical Engineering (B. Tech in ME)
- Bachelor of Technology in Electronics & Communication Engineering (B. Tech in ECE)

== Departments ==
The course of the college and its academics are managed by following departments.

- Department of Mechanical Engineering
- Department of Electronics and Communication Engineering
- Department of Computer Science and Engineering
- Department of Basic Engineering Sciences and Humanities

== Admissions ==
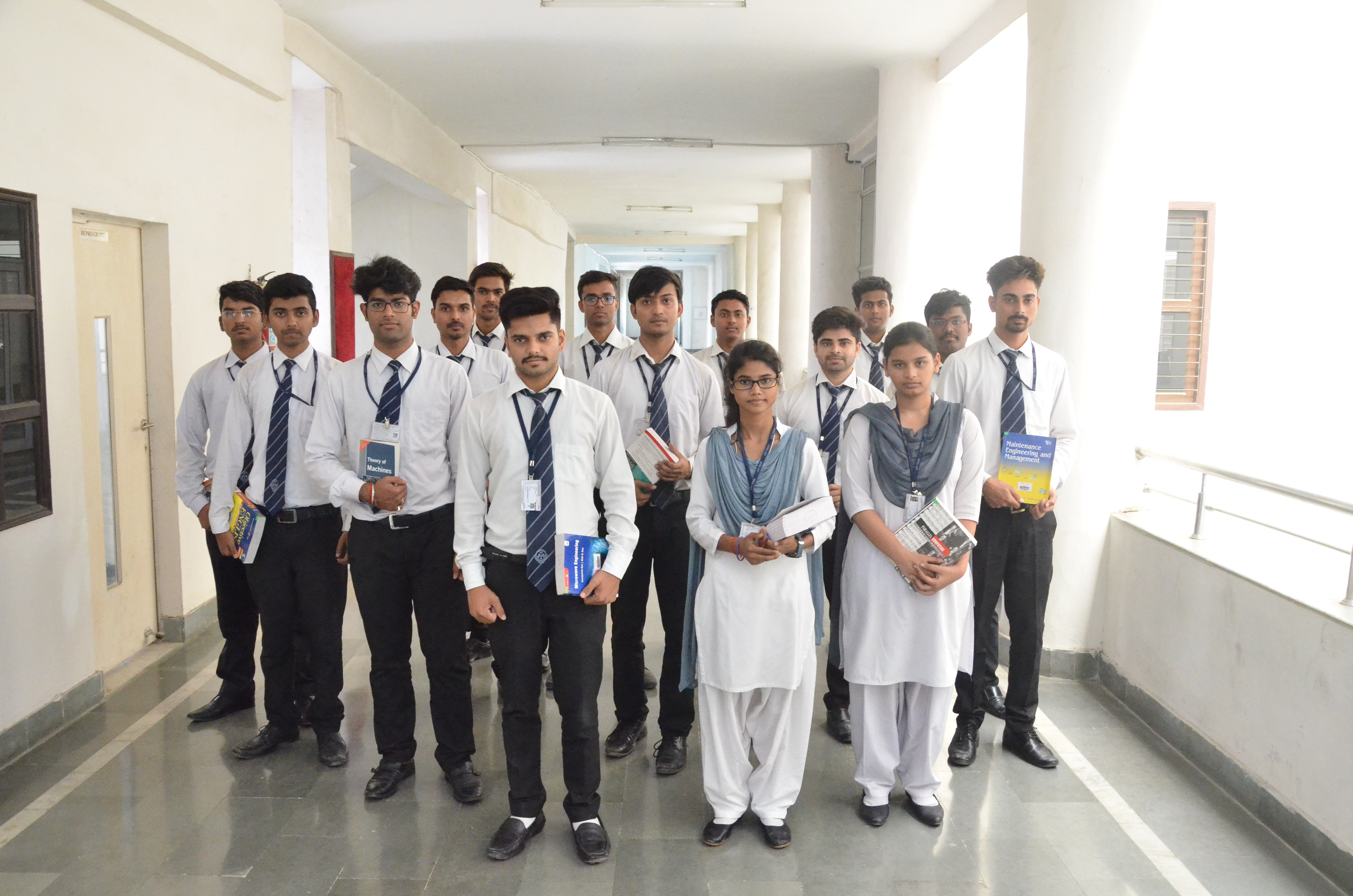
The after class gathering

Shri Ram Murti Smarak College of Engineering and Technology (SRMSCET) Unnao offers admissions into the first and second year of Bachelor of Technology (B. Tech.) program, following the norms and guidelines set by the Affiliating University and the State Government.

- First-Year Eligibility: Candidates for first-year admission must have passed the 10+2 level examination from a recognized board with an aggregate of 60% marks in Physics, Chemistry, and Mathematics. The candidate must have passed each subject in the 10+2 examination without grace marks.
- Management Seats: Admissions for management quota seats are granted through the SRMS EET, a common entrance test for SRMS Engineering Institutions in Bareilly and Lucknow.
- Lateral Entry: Candidates who hold a three-year diploma from a recognized technical education board with 60% marks are eligible for second-year admission under the lateral entry scheme.

== Campus life and support ==
The campus provides comprehensive facilities, including dedicated spaces for both outdoor and indoor sports, and a gymnasium. Student hostels are located within the campus. To support rigorous study, the academic labs and the library remain open until 11:00 PM.

The college supports academic excellence through merit scholarship offered to all students who secures 75% and above marks in their passing examinations. The college formally recognizes student merit and honours graduates during the convocation ceremony of SRMS Institutions, held annually on 8 February.

== Research and development ==
The research and development (R & D) cell of SRMS manages following activities to foster innovation and academic outreach:

- Technological Innovation
- Campus Outreach
- Projects and Consultancy
- INSPIRE Internship

== SRMS institutions ==
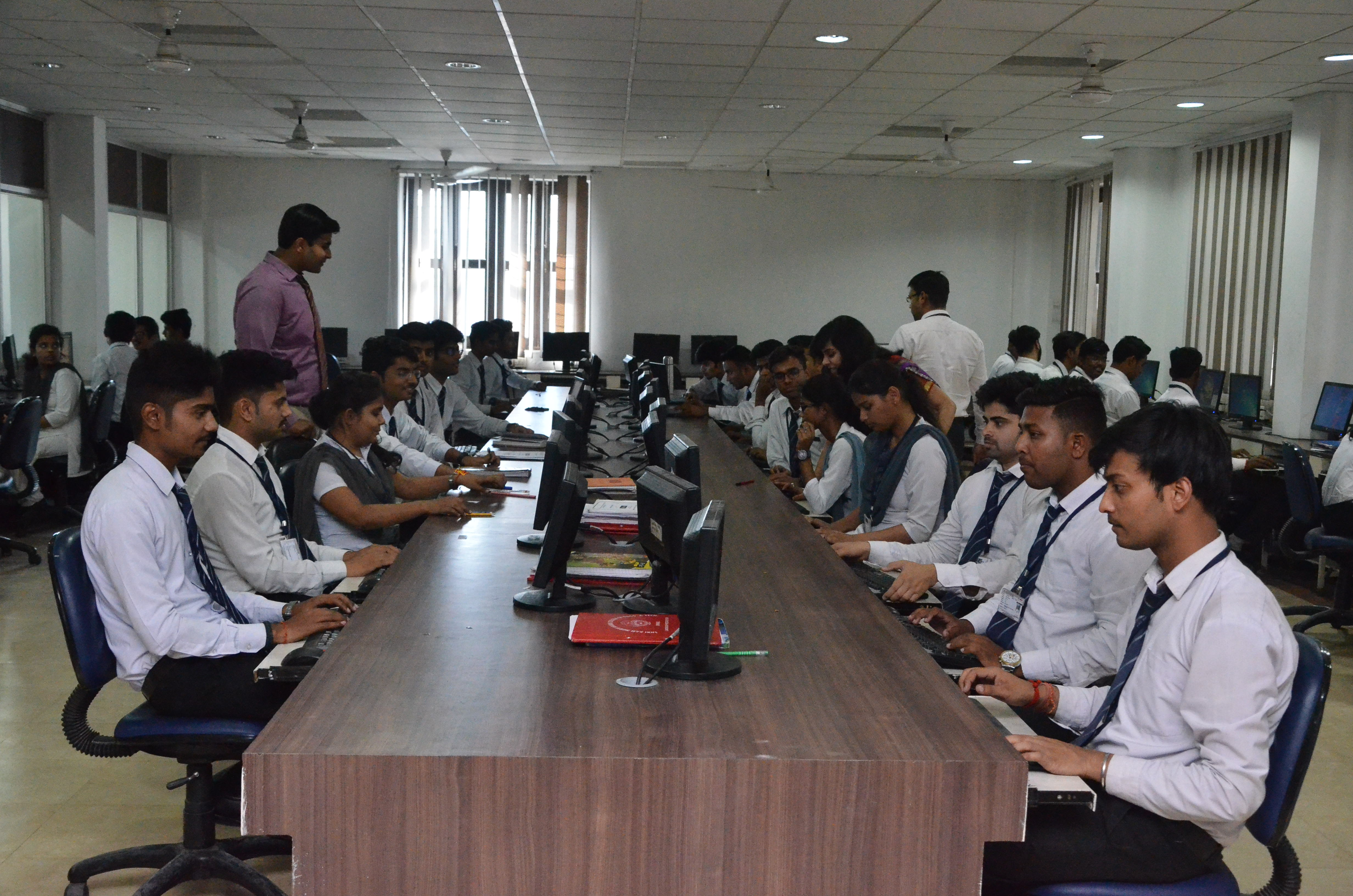
Engineering students working on computers

The following SRMS institutions, with years of establishment, have been established and managed by SRMS Trust at Bareilly, Lucknow and Unnao.

- Shri Ram Murti Smarak College of Engineering and Technology, Bareilly(1996)
- Shri Ram Murti Smarak College of Engineering and Technology (Pharmacy), Bareilly (2000)
- Shri Ram Murti Smarak Multi Super specialty Tertiary Care Hospital and Trauma Centre, Bareilly (2002)
- Shri Ram Murti Smarak Institute of Medical Sciences Bareilly (2005)
- Shri Ram Murti Smarak School of Nursing, Bareilly (2006)
- Shri Ram Murti Smarak College of Engineering, Technology & Research, Bareilly (2008)
- Shri Ram Murti Smarak R R Cancer Institute and Research Centre, Bareilly (2008)
- Shri Ram Murti Smarak Institute of Paramedical Sciences, Bareilly (2011)
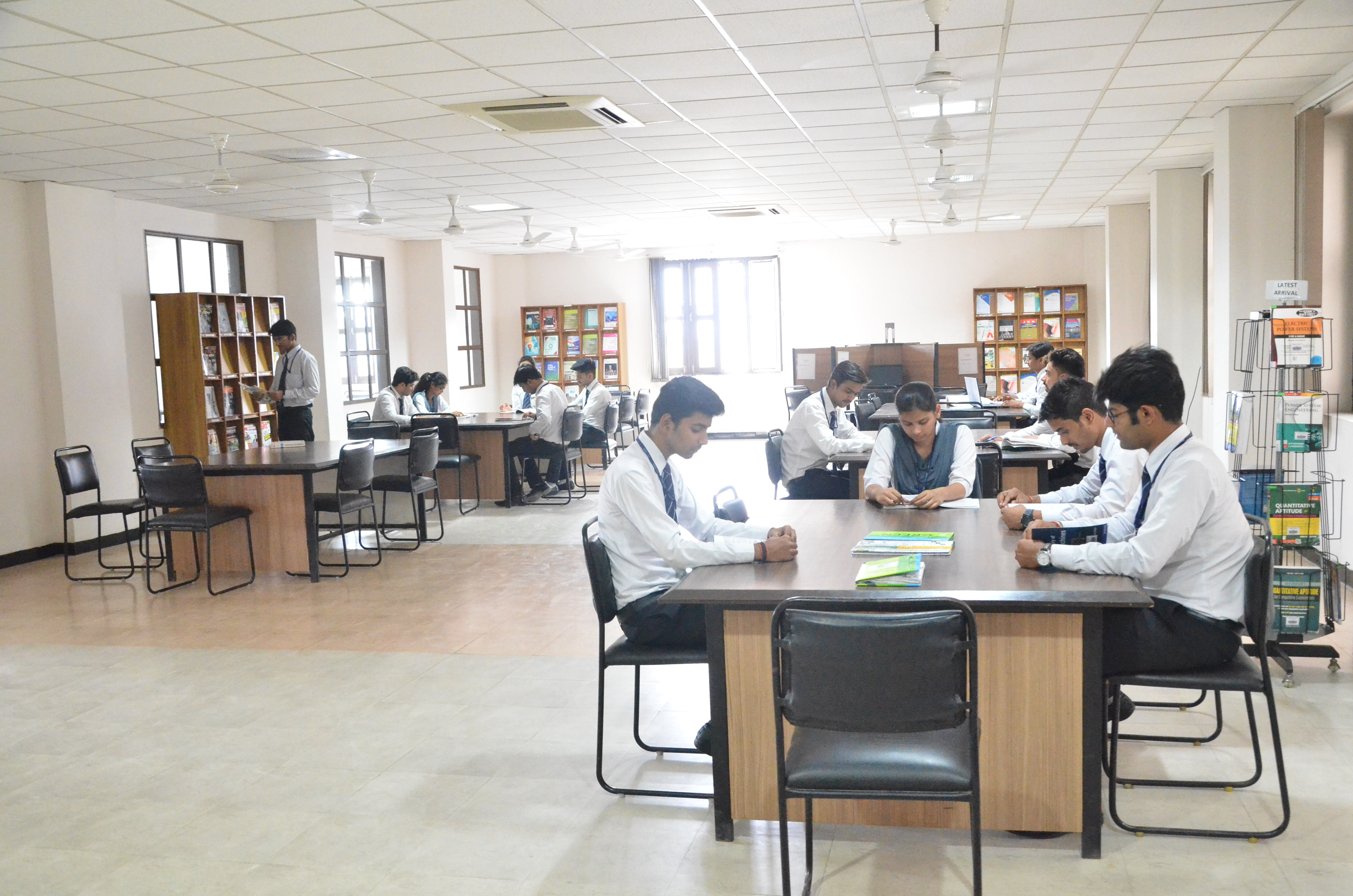
- Reading in Library
  Shri Ram Murti Smarak International Business School, Lucknow(2011)
- Shri Ram Murti Smarak College of Engineering and Technology, Unnao (2011)
- Shri Ram Murti Smarak Functional Imaging and Medical Centre, Lucknow (2015)
- Shri Ram Murti Smarak College of Nursing, Bareilly (2017)

== See also ==
- All India Council for Technical Education
- Dr A P J Abdul Kalam Technical University
