= Santosh Gangwar =

Indian politician (born 1948)

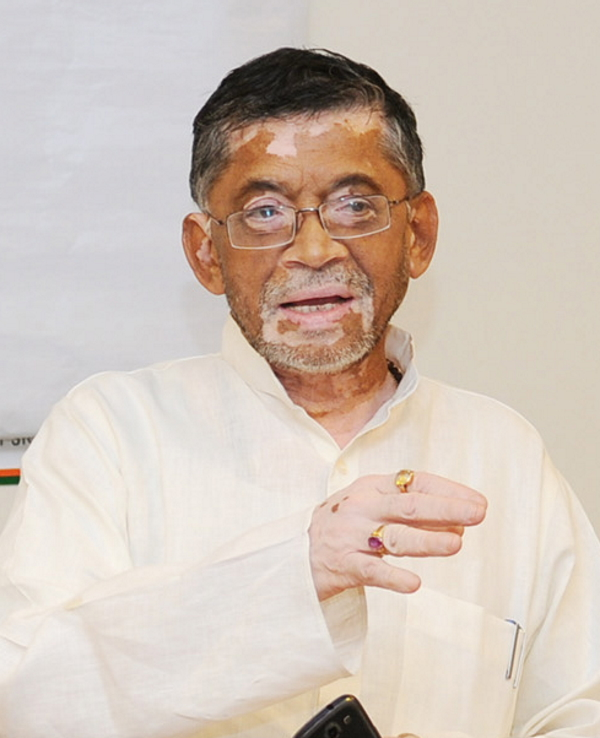
- Gangwar in 2015

Governor of Jharkhand
- Incumbent
- Assumed office 31 July 2024
- Chief Minister: Hemant Soren
- Preceded by: C. P. Radhakrishnan

Union Minister of State (Independent Charge) for Labour and Employment
- In office 3 September 2017 – 7 July 2021
- Prime Minister: Narendra Modi
- Preceded by: Bandaru Dattatreya
- Succeeded by: Bhupender Yadav

Union Minister of State for Finance
- In office 5 July 2016 – 3 September 2017
- Minister: Arun Jaitley
- Preceded by: Jayant Sinha
- Succeeded by: Shiv Pratap Shukla

Union Minister of State (Independent Charge) for Textiles
- In office 26 May 2014 – 7 July 2016
- Prime Minister: Narendra Modi
- Preceded by: Kavuri Samba Siva Rao
- Succeeded by: Smriti Irani

Member of Parliament, Lok Sabha
- In office 16 May 2014 – 4 June 2024
- Preceded by: Praveen Singh Aron
- Succeeded by: Chhatrapal Singh Gangwar
- Constituency: Bareilly, Uttar Pradesh
- In office 29 November 1989 – 17 May 2009
- Preceded by: Abida Ahmed
- Succeeded by: Praveen Singh Aron
- Constituency: Bareilly, Uttar Pradesh

Chairperson of Public Accounts Committee
- In office 2009–2010
- Preceded by: Vijay Kumar Malhotra
- Succeeded by: Jaswant Singh

Personal details
- Born: 1 November 1948 (age 77) Bareilly, United Provinces, Dominion of India (present–day Uttar Pradesh, India)
- Party: Bharatiya Janata Party
- Spouse: Saubhagya Gangwar (m. 1975)
- Children: 2
- Education: Bareilly College (B.Sc.); Dr. Bhimrao Ambedkar University (L.L.B.)
- As of 22 September, 2006

Santosh Kumar Gangwar (born 1 November 1948) is an Indian politician currently serving as the eleventh Governor of Jharkhand since 2024. He is a former Minister of State with independent charge in the Ministry of Labour and Employment in the Government of India. He was a Member of Parliament (16th Lok Sabha), former minister of state in Government of India and a leader of Bharatiya Janata Party (BJP). He has been Member of Parliament for the city of Bareilly for almost three decades. He was also the chief whip of the party in 14th Lok Sabha.

He faced defeat in the 15th Lok Sabha Elections, 2009 by a very narrow margin by Praveen Singh Aron. Gangwar was the chairman of the Public Accounts Committee in 2009. He has been elected as Member of Parliament in 16th Lok Sabha. He won by a margin of over 2.4 lakh votes over his rival candidate in 2014 general election. He resigned from the post of cabinet minister ahead of the cabinet reshuffle in July 2021. He is formerly the Chairperson of the Committee on Public Undertakings.

Santosh Gangwar was appointed the Governor of Jharkhand by President Droupadi Murmu on 27 June 2024.

== Early life ==
Born on 1 November 1948 in Bareilly, he studied in Bareilly College, Bareilly and did his B.Sc. in 1967 and LLB in 1970. At that time Bareilly College was an affiliated college of Agra University and Gangwar was awarded both BSc and LLB degrees from Agra University.

Before joining politics, Gangwar was actively involved in the establishment of the Urban Cooperative Bank in Bareilly and held the position of its chairman since its beginning in the year 1996. In Bareilly, he has been given credit for getting several projects executed for public use such as Chaupla Railway over-bridge, a library, and a mini bypass. Married to Saubhagya Gangwar, they have two children. He has vitiligo.

== Career ==
Gangwar was jailed during the Emergency for guiding a people's movement against the then Government. He served as a member of the Uttar Pradesh State BJP Working Committee and held the position of General Secretary of the Uttar Pradesh BJP Unit in 1996.

Gangwar was elected for the first time to the 9th Lok Sabha in 1989 from the Bareilly constituency. He represented that constituency continuously until 2009 as a BJP Member of Parliament, which involved six successive terms.

He has held ministerial posts in the Government of India. He was Minister of State for Petroleum and Natural Gas with the additional charge of Parliament Affairs in 13th Lok Sabha. Prior to this, Gangwar was Minister of State of Science and Technology with the additional charge of Parliamentary Affairs during October and November 1999.

Santosh Gangwar is a Member of Parliament in the 16th Lok Sabha.

He served as Minister of State for Textiles from 26 May 2014 to 5 July 2016, after which he was sworn in as Minister of State for Finance.

Gangwar forayed into national politics in the year 1989, when he got elected from Bareilly in the 9th Lok Sabha on a BJP ticket. In 1996, Gangwar became the General Secretary of the BJP's Uttar Pradesh unit. Later, he kept on winning from the same constituency and remained an MP in the next six successive terms till 2009. In the 14th Lok Sabha, he was the chief whip of his party, but in the year 2009 elections for 15th Lok Sabha, he had to face defeat by a narrow margin.

In April 2018 Gangwar stirred controversy by saying that "one should not make a big deal" about rape in a country as large as India. The statements followed two incidents where BJP leaders were implicated in violent sexual assault of minors.

27 May 2014 onwards Union Minister of State (Independent Charge) Ministry of Textiles; Ministry of Parliamentary Affairs; and Ministry of Water Resources, River Development and Ganga Rejuvenation.

In May 2019, Gangwar became the Minister of State (Independent Charge) for Labour and Employment.

== Governor of Jharkhand (2024–present) ==
Gangwar was appointed as the Governor of Jharkhand by President Droupadi Murmu on 27 June 2024 and took oath on 31 July 2024.

Lok Sabha
Preceded by Abida Ahmed	Member of Parliament for Bareilly; 1989 – 2009	Succeeded by Praveen Singh Aron
Preceded by Praveen Singh Aron	Member of Parliament for Bareilly; 2014 – 2024	Succeeded by Chhatrapal Singh Gangwar
Political offices
Preceded by Kavuri Samba Siva Rao	Minister of Textiles; 26 May 2014 – 7 July 2016; Minister of State (Independent Charge)	Succeeded by Smriti Irani
Preceded by Bandaru Dattatreya; Minister of State (Independent Charge)	Minister of Labour and Employment; 3 September 2017 – 7 May 2021; Minister of State (Independent Charge)	Succeeded by Bhupender Yadav
Preceded by C.P. Radhakrishnan	Governor of Jharkhand; 31 July 2024 – Present	Incumbent
