= Ram Murti =

Indian politician

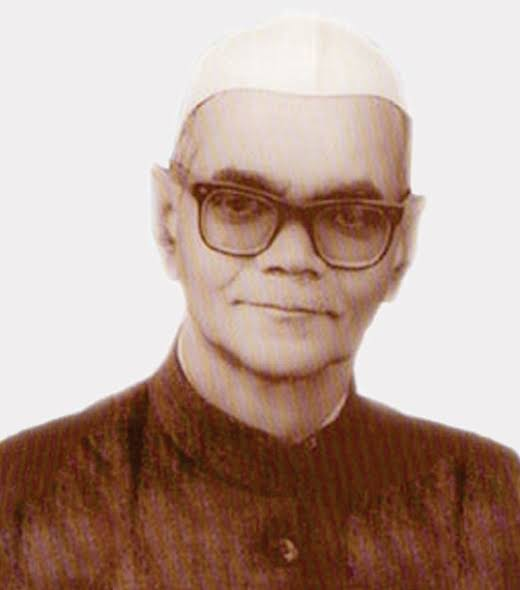

Member of Uttar Pradesh Legislative Assembly
- In office 1946-1969
- Succeeded by: Shafiq Ahmad Khan
- Constituency: Baheri
- In office 1974-1977
- Preceded by: Shafiq Ahmad Khan
- Succeeded by: Rafiq Ahmad Khan

Member of Parliament, Lok Sabha
- In office 1977-1980
- Preceded by: Satish Chandra (politician)
- Succeeded by: Abida Ahmed
- Constituency: Bareilly

Personal details
- Born: 10 July 1910 Bareilly, United Provinces, British India
- Died: 2 October 1988
- Party: Janata Party
- Other political affiliations: Indian National Congress (O); Indian National Congress
- Spouse: Ram Rakhi Dev
- Education: M.A., LL.B.
- Alma mater: Banaras Hindu University and Lucknow University

Ram Murti was an Indian politician. He was elected to the Lok Sabha, the lower house of the Parliament of India from the Bareilly as a member of the Janata Party. He took an active part in all the movements launched by Mahatma Gandhi since 1930 and was imprisoned various times. He was Member, Uttar Pradesh Legislative Assembly from 1946 to 1969, and from 1974 to 1977, he was Minister in the cabinet led by Hemwati Nandan Bahuguna and N. D. Tiwari.
