= Raghavendra Sharma =

Member of Uttar Pradesh Legislative Assembly

Member (MLA) of Uttar Pradesh Legislative Assembly
- Incumbent
- Assumed office March 2022
- Preceded by: Rajesh Kumar Mishra
- Constituency: Bithari Chainpur

Personal details
- Born: 27 June 1971 (age 55) Budaun, Uttar Pradesh, India
- Party: Bharatiya Janata Party
- Spouse: Deepshikha Joshi
- Education: Deen Dayal Upadhyay Gorakhpur University
- Profession: Politician

Raghavendra Sharma is an Indian doctor, politician, and member of the 18th Uttar Pradesh Assembly representing the Bithari Chainpur Assembly constituency.

He is a member of the Bharatiya Janata Party.

== Early life and education ==
Raghavendra Sharma was born on 27 July 1971 in Budaun, Uttar Pradesh, to a Hindu Brahman family of Kaushal Kishor Sharma.

He completed his post-graduation from Deen Dayal Upadhyay Gorakhpur University in 2001.

He married Deepshikha Joshi, and they have two daughters.
