= Soues, Somme =

Soues
- Commune
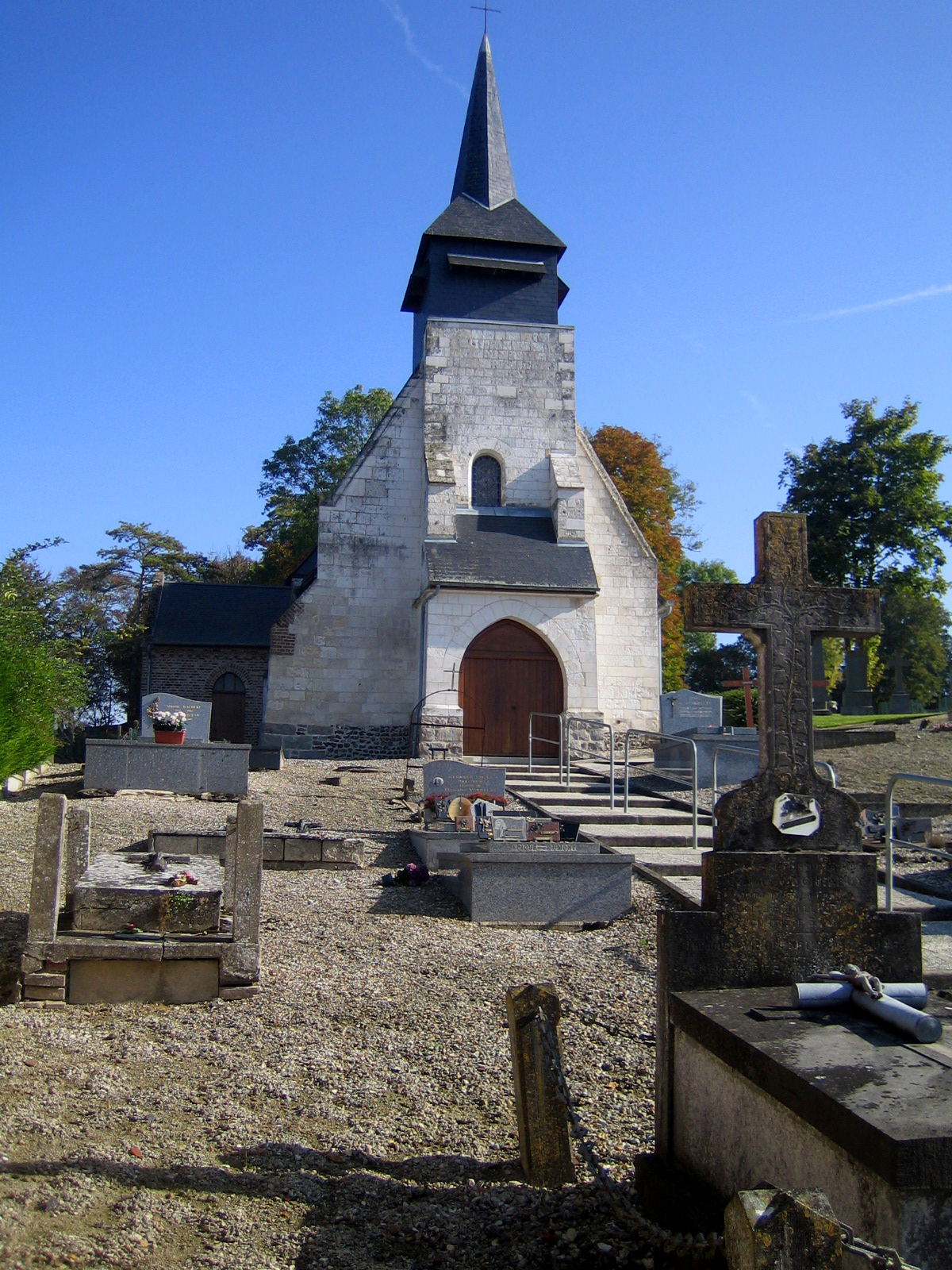
- The church in Soues
- Location of Soues
- Location within France Location within Hauts-de-France
- Coordinates: 49°57′27″N 2°03′18″E
- Country: France
- Region: Hauts-de-France
- Department: Somme
- Arrondissement: Amiens
- Canton: Ailly-sur-Somme
- Intercommunality: CC Nièvre et Somme

Government
  - Mayor (2020–2026): Annick Lemaire
- Area^{1}: 8.64 km^{2} (3.34 sq mi)
- Elevation: 65 m (213 ft)
- Highest elevation: 101 m (331 ft)
- Lowest elevation: 19 m (62 ft)
- Population (2023): 124
  - Density: 14.4/km^{2} (37.2/sq mi)
- Time zone: UTC+01:00 (CET)
  - Summer (DST): UTC+02:00 (CEST)
- INSEE/Postal code: 80738 /80310
- ^{1} French Land Register data, which excludes lakes, ponds, glaciers > 1 km^{2} (0.386 sq mi or 247 acres) and river estuaries.

Soues (French pronunciation: [su]) is a commune in the Somme department in Hauts-de-France in northern France.

== Geography ==
Soues is situated 9 miles (14 km) northwest of Amiens, at the D936 and D69 crossroads.

== Population ==
Historical population
Year	Pop.	±% p.a.
1968	97	—
1975	116	+2.59%
1982	149	+3.64%
1990	136	−1.13%
1999	127	−0.76%
2007	120	−0.71%
2012	151	+4.70%
2017	125	−3.71%
2023	124	−0.13%
Source: INSEE

== Places of interest ==
- The church and graveyard

== See also ==
- Communes of the Somme department
