= Satish Chandra (politician) =

Indian politician (1917–1990)

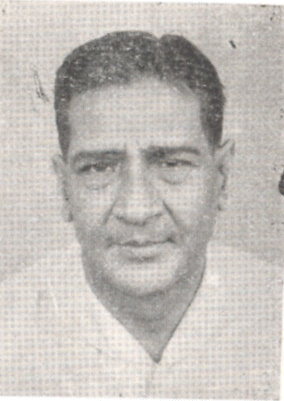

Member of Parliament, Lok Sabha
- In office 1952–1962
- Succeeded by: Brij Raj Singh
- In office 1971–1977
- Preceded by: Brij Bhushan Lal
- Succeeded by: Ram Murti
- Constituency: Bareilly, Uttar Pradesh

Personal details
- Born: 21 January 1917 Bareilly, United Provinces, British India
- Died: 5 January 1990 (aged 72)
- Party: Indian National Congress
- Spouse: Rajkumari

Satish Chandra (21 January 1917 – 5 January 1990) was an Indian politician. He was elected to the Lok Sabha, the lower house of the Parliament of India from the Bareilly, Uttar Pradesh as a member of the Indian National Congress. He was the Deputy Minister for Defence, 1952–1955, Deputy Minister for Production, 1955–1957 and Deputy Minister for Commerce and Industry, 1957–1962 in the Nehru Ministry.

Chandra died on 5 January 1990, at the age of 72.
