= Sultan Baig =

Indian politician

- Born: January 1, 1957 (age 69); Uttar Pradesh
- Education: G. B. Pant University of Agriculture and Technology
- Occupation: Politician
- Political party: Samajwadi Party
- Parent: Haazi Dulha

Sultan Baig is an Indian politician and a member of the Sixteenth Legislative Assembly of Uttar Pradesh in India. He represented the Meerganj constituency of Uttar Pradesh and is a member of the Samajwadi party political party.

== Early life and education ==
Sultan Baig was born on January 1, 1957, in Uttar Pradesh. He attained a master of science (agriculture) post-graduation from G. B. Pant University of Agriculture and Technology, Uttrakhand.

== Political career ==
Sultan Baig has been a MLA for three terms. He represented the Meerganj constituency and is a member of the Samajwadi Party political party.

== Posts held ==
| # | From | To | Position | Comments |
|---|---|---|---|---|
| 01 | March 2012 | March 2017 | Member, 16th Legislative Assembly | |
| 02 | May 2007 | March 2012 | Member, 15th Legislative Assembly | |
| 03 | February 2002 | May 2007 | Member, 14th Legislative Assembly | |

== See also ==
- Meerganj (Assembly constituency)
- Sixteenth Legislative Assembly of Uttar Pradesh
- Uttar Pradesh Legislative Assembly
