= Breilly =

- Commune
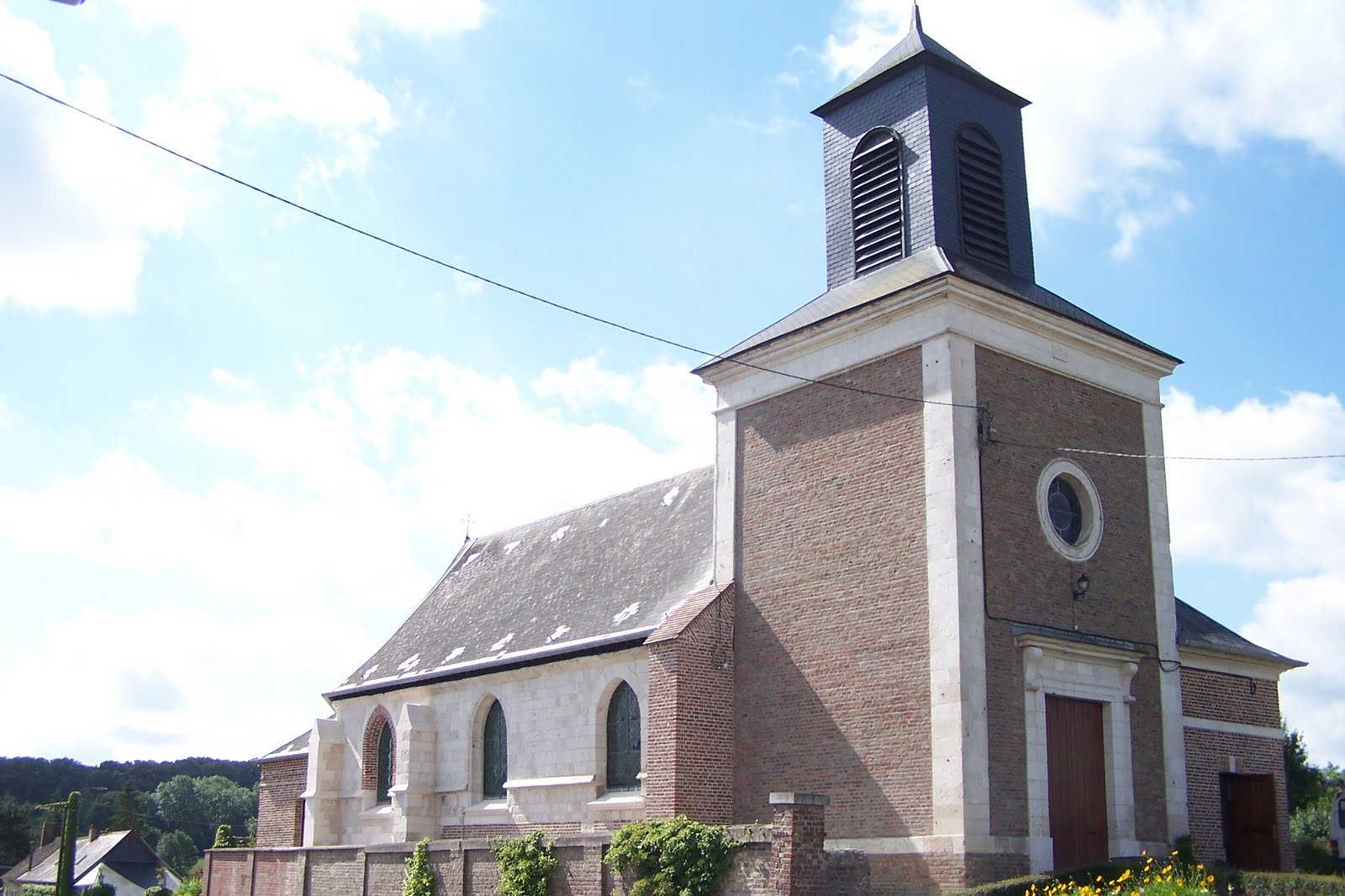
- The church in Breilly

- Coat of arms
- Location of Breilly
- Location within France Location within Hauts-de-France
- Coordinates: 49°56′07″N 2°10′51″E
- Country: France
- Region: Hauts-de-France
- Department: Somme
- Arrondissement: Amiens
- Canton: Ailly-sur-Somme
- Intercommunality: CC Nièvre et Somme

Government
  - Mayor (2022–2026): Louis Lagrange
- Area^{1}: 5.73 km^{2} (2.21 sq mi)
- Elevation: 17 m (56 ft)
- Highest elevation: 101 m (331 ft)
- Lowest elevation: 12 m (39 ft)
- Population (2023): 707
  - Density: 123/km^{2} (320/sq mi)
- Time zone: UTC+01:00 (CET)
  - Summer (DST): UTC+02:00 (CEST)
- INSEE/Postal code: 80137 /80470
- ^{1} French Land Register data, which excludes lakes, ponds, glaciers > 1 km^{2} (0.386 sq mi or 247 acres) and river estuaries.

Breilly (French pronunciation: [bʁɛji]) is a commune in the Somme department in Hauts-de-France in northern France.

== Geography ==
Breilly is situated on the D1235 road, by the banks of the river Somme, some 4 miles (6 km) northwest of Amiens.

== Places of interest ==
- St Sulpice church
- St Louis chapel
- war memorial
- The "château de Breilly" (private location - ruins).

== Population ==
Historical population
Year	Pop.	±% p.a.
1968	403	—
1975	419	+0.56%
1982	434	+0.50%
1990	434	+0.00%
1999	462	+0.70%
2007	472	+0.27%
2012	459	−0.56%
2017	685	+8.34%
2023	707	+0.53%
Source: INSEE

== See also ==
- Communes of the Somme department
