= Arun Kumar Saxena =

Indian physician and politician

Arun Kumar

Minister of Environment, Forest & Climate Change Government of Uttar Pradesh
- Incumbent
- Assumed office 25 March 2022
- Chief Minister: Yogi Adityanath
- Preceded by: Dara Singh Chauhan

Member of Uttar Pradesh Legislative Assembly
- Incumbent
- Assumed office Mar 2012
- Preceded by: Rajesh Agarwal
- Constituency: Bareilly

Personal details
- Born: 24 December 1948 (age 77) Bareilly, United Provinces, India
- Party: Bharatiya Janata Party
- Spouse: Urmila Saxena (m. 1972)
- Children: 1
- Education: King George's Medical University (M.B.B.S)
- Profession: Physician; politician

Arun Kumar is an Indian physician, politician and a member of Uttar Pradesh Legislative Assembly. He represents the Bareilly constituency of Uttar Pradesh and is a member of the Bharatiya Janata Party political party.

== Early life and education ==
Arun Kumar was born in Bareilly district to Girish Chandra, a physician. He attended the King George's Medical University and attained M.B.B.S. degree. He is physician by profession.

== Political career ==
Kumar has been a MLA for two terms. He represented the Bareilly constituency and is a member of the Bharatiya Janata Party political party.

== Positions held ==
#	From	To	Position
01	2012	2017	Member, 16th Legislative Assembly
02	2017	2022	Member, 17th Legislative Assembly
03	2022	-	Member, 18th Legislative Assembly

== See also ==
- Bareilly (Assembly constituency)
- Sixteenth Legislative Assembly of Uttar Pradesh
- Uttar Pradesh Legislative Assembly
