= Bareilly Assembly constituency =

Constituency of the Uttar Pradesh legislative assembly in India

Bareilly
- Constituency No. 125 for the Uttar Pradesh Legislative Assembly

Constituency details
- Country: India
- Region: North India
- State: Uttar Pradesh
- District: Bareilly
- Total electors: 416,136 (2017)
- Reservation: None

Member of Legislative Assembly
- 18th Uttar Pradesh Legislative Assembly
- Incumbent Arun Kumar Saxena
- Party: Bharatiya Janata Party
- Elected year: 2022
- Preceded by: Rajesh Agarwal

Bareilly Assembly constituency (Hindi pronunciation: [bəɾeːliː]) is one of the 403 constituencies of the Uttar Pradesh Legislative Assembly, India. It is a part of the Bareilly district and one of the five assembly constituencies in the Bareilly Lok Sabha constituency. First election in this assembly constituency was held in 2012 after the "Delimitation of Parliamentary and Assembly Constituencies Order, 2008" was passed and the constituency was formed in 2008. The constituency is assigned identification number 124. And Baheri town is the largest Tahseel of zila Bareilly, settled with Muslim Majority. Meena Bazar is a famous place in Baheri and known around the other places as a great hub for Ladies' shopping. VVPAT facility with EVMs will be here in the 2017 U.P assembly polls.

== Wards / Areas ==
Extent of Bareilly Assembly constituency is Ward Nos. 3, 4, 7, 12 to 15, 18, 19, 22, 23, 24, 26, 28 to 32, 36, 376, 39, 41, 461, 55, 56 in Bareilly (M Corp.) & Northern Railway Colony (OG) – Ward No. 61 of Bareilly Tehsil.

== Members of Legislative Assembly ==
Year	Member	Party
1952	Govind Ballabh Pant	Indian National Congress
1957	Jagdish Saran Agarwal	Indian National Congress
1962	Jagdish Saran Agarwal	Indian National Congress
1967	Jagdish Saran Agarwal	Indian National Congress
1969	Ram Singh Khanna	Bharatiya Kranti Dal
1974	Satya Prakash	Bharatiya Jana Sangh
1977	Satya Prakash	Janata Party
1980	Ram Singh Khanna	Indian National Congress (I)
1985	Dinesh Johri	Bharatiya Janata Party
1989	Dinesh Johri	Bharatiya Janata Party
1991	Dinesh Johri	Bharatiya Janata Party
1993	Rajesh Agarwal	Bharatiya Janata Party
1996	Rajesh Agarwal	Bharatiya Janata Party
2002	Rajesh Agarwal	Bharatiya Janata Party
2007	Rajesh Agarwal	Bharatiya Janata Party
2012	Arun Kumar Saxena	Bharatiya Janata Party
2017	Arun Kumar Saxena	Bharatiya Janata Party
2022	Arun Kumar Saxena	Bharatiya Janata Party

== Election results ==
=== 2027 ===
2027 Uttar Pradesh Legislative Assembly election: Bareilly
Party	Candidate	Votes	%	±%
INDIA				
NDA				
BSP				
NOTA	None of the above			
Majority				
Turnout				
gain from		Swing		

=== 2022 ===
2022 Uttar Pradesh Legislative Assembly election: Bareilly
Party	Candidate	Votes	%	±%
BJP	Arun Kumar Saxena	129,014	53.77	+2.4
SP	Rajesh Kumar Agarwal	96,694	40.3	
BSP	Brahmanand Sharma	6,982	2.91	−3.6
INC	Krishna Kant Sharma	2,311	0.96	−37.62
NOTA	None of the above	1,178	0.49	−0.15
Majority		32,320	13.47	+0.68
Turnout		239,946	52.43	−1.49
BJP hold		Swing		

=== 2017 ===
U. P. Legislative Assembly Election, 2017: Bareilly
Party	Candidate	Votes	%	±%
BJP	Arun Kumar Saxena	115,270	51.37	
INC	Prem Prakash Agarwal	86,559	38.58	
BSP	Er. Anees Ahamad Khan	14,596	6.51	
NOTA	None of the above	1,427	0.64	
Majority		28,711	12.79	
Turnout		224,378	53.92	
BJP hold		Swing		

=== 2012 ===
U. P. Legislative Assembly Election, 2012: Bareilly
Party	Candidate	Votes	%	±%
BJP	Arun Kumar Saxena	68,983	37.19	
SP	Dr. Anil Sharma	41,921	22.60	
IEMC	Sher Ali Jafri	31,113	16.77	
BSP	Dr. Anees Baig	21,753	11.73	
INC	Mujahid Hassan Khan	8,016	4.32	
PECP	Yusuf Khan	3,999	2.16	
Majority		27,062	14.59	
Turnout		185,484	54.31	
BJP hold		Swing		

=== 2007 ===
U. P. Legislative Assembly Election, 2007: Bareilly City
Party	Candidate	Votes	%	±%
BJP	Rajesh Agarwal	26,893	31.52	
INC	Dr. Anil Sharma	16,464	19.30	
SP	Dr. Arun Kumar	16,222	19.01	
IND.	Dr. I. S. Tomer	15,895	18.63	
BSP	Sunil Mehta	4,326	5.07	
IND.	Mohammad Saeed	3,102	3.64	
Majority		10,429	12.22	
Turnout		85,317	31.25	
BJP hold		Swing		

== See also ==
- Aonla Lok Sabha constituency
- Bareilly district
- Sixteenth Legislative Assembly of Uttar Pradesh
- Uttar Pradesh Legislative Assembly
- Vidhan Bhawan
