= U.P. Pt. Deen Dayal Upadhyaya Veterinary Science University and Cattle Research Institute =

Veterinary College in India

Coordinates: 27°27′38.15″N 77°42′2.75″E

U.P. Pandit Deen Dayal Upadhyaya Veterinary Science University and Cattle Research Institute
- Uttar Pradesh Pandit Deen Dayal Upadhyaya Pashu Chikitsa Vigyan Vishwavidyalaya Evam Go-Anusandhan Sansthan
- Former names: U.P. College of Veterinary Science and Animal Husbandry
- Type: State
- Established: 25 October 2001 (24 years ago)
- Affiliations: ICAR, UGC
- Chancellor: Governor of Uttar Pradesh
- Vice-Chancellor: Dr. Abhijit Mitra
- Location: Mathura, Uttar Pradesh, India
- Campus: 2,100 acres (Main Campus & Madhuri Khund Campus)
- Website: www.upvetuniv.edu.in

U.P. Pt. Deen Dayal Upadhyaya Veterinary Science University and Cattle Research Institute or U.P. Pt. Deen Dayal Upadhyay Pashu Chikitsa Vigyan Vishwavidyalaya Evam Go-Ansundhan Sansthan, formerly Veterinary College, Mathura is a university and the fourth oldest veterinary school in India. It is located in the city of Mathura.

The university was established as a college in 1947 by the government of Uttar Pradesh. In 2001, it was converted into a university.

== Curriculum ==
The college offers B. V. Sc and A.H., M. V. Sc. and PhD programs in veterinary science and a B. Sc. program in fisheries science. The college offers other programs, such as biotechnology, microbiology, surgery, gynecology, pharmacology, physiology, biochemistry, health, clinical medicine and toxicology.

== Facilities ==
The parasitology, pathology and osteology departments have large specimen collections. Many subspecies of salmonella such as S. goverdhan, S. mathurae and Mycoplasma sps have been researched there.

The clinics department offers X-ray and ultrasound facilities.

== Affiliates ==
=== Gorakhpur ===
The Veterinary College, Gorakhpur is an upcoming college in Gorakhpur dedicated to Veterinary Sciences. It will be affiliated to the institute. In Feb 2024, UP Government allocated 100 cr INR budget for college construction. On 3rd March 2024, UP CM Yogi Adityanath performed ground breaking ceremony of College in Tal Nador, Gorakhpur

College campus will be created in 80 acres area. The campus will have facilities like hospital block, academic block, staff quarters, hostels along with research centers. In first year, around 100 students will be admitted.
