= Praveen Singh Aron =

Indian politician & Lawyer

Member of Parliament
- In office 2009-2014
- Preceded by: Santosh Gangwar
- Succeeded by: Santosh Gangwar
- Constituency: Bareilly

Personal details
- Born: 8 May 1957 (age 69) Bareilly, Uttar Pradesh
- Party: Samajwadi Party
- Spouse: Supriya Aron
- Children: Sonam Aron & Pallavi Aron
- Parents: Late Dr. P.C. Aron (father); Late Smt. Swaraj Shuchi Aron (mother)
- Website: http://praveenaron.com/
- As of 20 February, 2024

Praveen Singh Aron is a politician belonging to the Samajwadi Party and formally a member of the Indian National Congress. He was a member of the Lok Sabha, the lower house of the Parliament of India from the Bareilly Lok Sabha constituency between 2009 and 2014. He had also served as MLA twice from Bareilly between 1989 and 1991 and 1993 and 1995. He has also served as minister of state in the government of Uttar Pradesh.

== Positions held ==
1. 1989-91 Member, Uttar Pradesh Legislative Assembly from Bareilly Cantonment Janata Dal

2. 1993-95 Member, Uttar Pradesh Legislative Assembly (second term) from Bareilly Cantonment Samajwadi Party

3. Minister of State, Science and Information Technology, Government of Uttar Pradesh

4. from 1995 Minister of State, Health and Family Welfare, Government of Uttar Pradesh

5. 2009 Elected to 15th Lok Sabha from Bareilly

6. 2014 Contested 16th Lok Sabha elections from Bareilly (INC) and lost

7. 2019 Contested 17th Lok Sabha elections from Bareilly (INC) and lost

8. 2024 Contested 18th Lok Sabha elections from Bareilly (SP) and lost

== Professional career ==
A lawyer practicing at various High Courts, the Delhi High Court, and the Supreme Court of India. They manage the law firm Attorneys Associate in Delhi. Their previous experience includes roles at private sector companies as Commercial Manager, Deputy General Manager, and Legal Advisor.

== Socio-political career ==
Has been actively associate with Jawaharlal Nehru National Youth Centre (A social organization formed under the patronage of late Smt. Indira Gandhi, as Chief Patron) with its Head Qtrs. at 219, Rouse Avenue, New Delhi. Starting with the post of General Secretary, Bareilly district reached to the positions of U.P. State General Secretary, All India Organizing Secretary and as All India General Secretary between 1979-2002.

He had been in student politics and won several Student Union Elections during school and college education period. Had been Bareilly City District General Secretary of NSUI, (1977) and Subsequently General Secretary of Bareilly city youth Congress subsequently until 1979.

In the year 1988, after being influenced by the pronouncements of Shri. V.P. Singh, regarding fighting corruption, joined the newly formed Janata Dal along with certain socialist leaders such as Shri Madhu Dandwate, Late Madhu Limaye and Shri Surendra Mohan etc. and was later nominated as National General Secretary of YUVA JANATA DAL.
