= Ataurrehman =

Indian politician

Ataur Rehman

MLA, 16th Legislative Assembly
- In office Mar 2012 – March 2017
- Preceded by: Chhatrapal Singh Gangwar
- Succeeded by: Chhatrapal Singh Gangwar
- Constituency: Baheri

Uttar Pradesh Legislative Assembly
- Incumbent
- Assumed office March 2022
- Preceded by: Chhatrapal Singh Gangwar
- Constituency: Baheri

Personal details
- Born: 10 January 1968 (age 58) Bareilly district, Uttar Pradesh, India
- Party: Samajwadi Party
- Spouse: Fareeda Rehman
- Relations: Wafa Ur Rehman (Brother) Naseem Ur Rehman (Brother)
- Children: 3
- Parent: Shafiq Ahmad
- Education: Diploma in Engineering
- Alma mater: Aligarh Muslim University
- Occupation: Politician
- Profession: Politician

Ataurrehman, also known as Ataur Rahman and Ata Ur Rehman, is an Indian politician and a member of the Sixteenth Legislative Assembly of Uttar Pradesh in India. He represents the Baheri constituency of Uttar Pradesh and is a member of the Samajwadi Party, a democratic socialist political party in India.

== Early life and education ==
Ataurrehman was born on 10 January 1968 in the family of Shafiq Ahmad in the Bareilly district of Uttar Pradesh, India. He completed Diploma in Engineering from Aligarh Muslim University in 1989.

== Political career ==
Ataurrehman has been the MLA of the 16th Legislative Assembly of Uttar Pradesh. He has represented Baheri constituency earlier also once and was minister in Samajwadi government.He represented the Baheri Assembly constituency and is a member of the Samajwadi Party, a social democratic political party founded by Mulayam Singh Yadav in India.

== Posts held ==
#	From	To	Position	Comments
01	2012	2017	Member, 16th Legislative Assembly	
02	2022	Present	Member, 18th Legislative Assembly	

== See also ==
- Baheri (Assembly constituency)
- Sixteenth Legislative Assembly of Uttar Pradesh
- Uttar Pradesh Legislative Assembly
