= Bareilly College =

College in Bareilly, India

Bareilly College, Bareilly
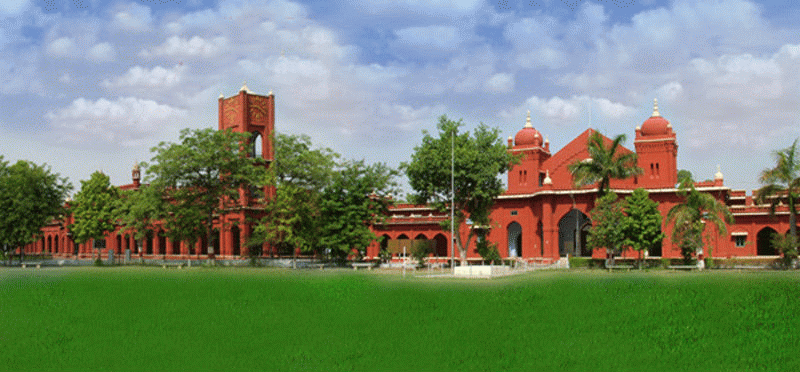
- Bareilly College, Bareilly
- Type: Government
- Established: 17 July 1837; 188 years ago
- Affiliations: Mahatma Jyotiba Phule Rohilkhand University
- Principal: Prof. O. P. Rai
- Location: Bareilly, India; 28°21′26.51″N 79°25′12.91″E
- Campus: Urban
- Website: bcb.ac.in/index.html

Bareilly College, Bareilly (BCB) is an institution located in the metropolis of Bareilly in the Indian state of Uttar Pradesh. The college is affiliated with the Mahatma Jyotiba Phule Rohilkhand University, and has been affiliated with the Agra University and Allahabad University before the establishment of Rohilkhand University. It was established during the reign British Empire in 1837.

The Bareilly College was established as a school in 1837 and was raised to the status of a college in 1850. The college suffered badly during the Indian Rebellion of 1857, when it served as a base for Indian freedom fighters. It was reopened in 1858 and was affiliated to the University of Calcutta in 1862. It was again closed in 1876 but was reopened in 1884 as a collegiate institution.

== History ==
Bareilly College was established in 1837 as a Government school under the Liberal Government of Sir Charles Metcalfe the then Lt. Governor of the North Western Provinces. It was a government institution, in which the students paid no fees till 1848. Thereafter the strength of school increased. The school was soon elevated to a Government College, with 57 enrolled students and Mr. Rogers as its headmaster. It was the only government school in the Bareilly district until 1849. In the year 1850, it was recognized as a Government Degree College with Mr. Vernon Tregear (1850–53) as its first principal. Several teachers and students of the college actively participated in the Indian Rebellion of 1857 and the principal of the college was killed by the revolutionaries. As a result the college was closed. The buildings of the college were used as the headquarters of the 42nd Royal Highlanders during this time and after the reorganisation of the school, a portion of the premises was occupied as the judge's court for some time.

The Bareilly college was reopened in 1858 after the city of Bareilly was re-annexed by the British. A boarding house was opened in the college in September 1860. The college was affiliated to the University of Calcutta in 1862. However the Bareilly college was abolished in 1876 owing to high maintenance cost and the facilities now available to students to attend other colleges due to the extension of railways. Soon afterwards, efforts to restart the college were initiated. A committee was constituted and the collection of subscriptions resulted in amassment of Rs 80,000 by 1883. Grants in aid were also obtained from the government as well as the municipality.

The Bareilly college was reopened in 1884 as a second grade college attached to the District High School. It was placed under the management of a local committee with a government grant of Rs 1800 a year while the remaining income was derived from an endowment fund. The Bareilly College was affiliated in arts to the University of Allahabad upon the latter's opening in 1888, and was affiliated in law a year later. As per a 1904 report by the Indian Ministry of Education, it was a semi-official college managed by a local committee and a pre-university institution. The Azad Hostel of the college was built in 1906. It served as a base for the national freedom movement From 1929 to 1943.

== Campus ==
The Bareilly College is housed in the building donated to the college by the Nawab of Rampur and the vicinity is still known as Rampur Garden or Rampur Bagh. A new building was added to it in 1905, whose cornerstone was laid by Sir James John Digges la Touche the then lieutenant governor of the Northern Province, now known as Uttar Pradesh. He named the building Bareilly College.

It now contains an auditorium at the central vista flanked by a clock tower. The auditorium has a seating capacity of 200 spectators. The auditorium building was originally built as a hall in 1906, which was converted into an auditorium in 1986.

The college also has a swimming pool, cafeteria, and a residential boarding house by the name Azad Hostel. Almost two centuries old, this college initially had four boarding houses converted into offices with time. Azad Hostel is the only boarding house that remains to the present day. At present it is defunct and a new building is being proposed at the place where it stands.

== Courses ==
The college consisted of only an arts faculty when it was initially started. The science and commerce departments were introduced in 1929 and 1944 respectively, while the BEd degree was introduced in 1956.

=== Graduate courses ===
BA

- Sociology
- Music
- Education
- Fine Arts
- Economics
- English
- Hindi
- Urdu
- Sanskrit
- Persian
- History
- Political Science
- Philosophy
- Statistics
- Military Science
- Arabic
- Geography
- Psychology
- Home Science

BSc

- Statistics
- Physics
- Mathematics
- Zoology
- Botany
- Military Science
- Biotechnology
- Environmental Science

B.Com

- Commerce

=== Professional courses ===
B.Com Honors

- Commerce

B.Ed

- Education

BBA (not approved by AICTE)

- Management

BCA (not approved by AICTE)

- Computer

B.Lib

- Library Science

LLB

- Law

=== Postgraduate courses ===
M.A.

- Mathematics
- Economics
- English
- Hindi
- Urdu
- Geography
- History
- Political Science
- Philosophy
- Sanskrit
- Sociology
- Military Science
- Fine Arts
- Statistics

M.Sc.

- Mathematics
- Physics
- Chemistry (Organic)
- Chemistry (Inorganic/Physical)
- Zoology
- Botany
- Military Science
- Statistics

M.Com.

LLM

== Faculties ==
- Arts
- Commerce
- Computer Science
- Education
- Law
- Management
- Science
- Environmental Science
- Biotechnology

== Departments ==
- Department of Science
- Department of Economics
- Department of Military Sciences
- Department of Geography
- Department of Music
- Department of Physical Education
- Department of Psychology
- Department of Physics
- Department of Chemistry
- Department of Biology
- Department of Biotechnology
- Department of English
- Department of Urdu
- Department of Fine Arts
- Department of Mathematics
- Department of Statistics
- Department of Law
- Department of Commerce

== Research ==
Bareilly College Bareilly awards Ph.D. degrees in Chemistry, Zoology, Botany, Mil. Studies, English, Economics, Mathematics, Statistics, Urdu, Hindi, Commerce, History, Philosophy, Drawing & Painting and Sociology.

== Notable alumni ==
List of notable people who studied at Bareilly College, Bareilly.

- Rajesh Agarwal, MLA
- Naseem Ahmad, IAS
- Santosh Kumar Gangwar, MP
- Vinod Kapri, filmmaker
- Ajit Singh, freedom fighter, uncle of Bhagat Singh

== See also ==
- Government Degree College Sambhal
- Mahatma Gandhi Memorial Post Graduate College
- Hindu Degree College, Moradabad
