= Rajesh Agarwal =

Indian politician

Finance Minister, Uttar Pradesh
- In office March 2017 – August 2019
- Chief Minister: Yogi Adityanath
- Preceded by: Akhilesh Yadav
- Succeeded by: Suresh Kumar Khanna

Treasurer, Bharatiya Janata Party
- In office 26 September 2020 – 17 August 2026
- Preceded by: Piyush Goyal
- Succeeded by: Piyush Goyal

Member of Uttar Pradesh Legislative Assembly
- In office 2012–2022
- Preceded by: Virendra Singh
- Succeeded by: Sanjeev Agarwal
- Constituency: Bareilly Cantt
- In office 1993–2012
- Preceded by: Dinesh Johri
- Succeeded by: Arun Kumar Saxena
- Constituency: Bareilly

Personal details
- Born: Bareilly, Uttar Pradesh
- Party: Bharatiya Janata Party
- Other political affiliations: National Democratic Alliance
- Children: Manish Agarwal, Parth Agarwal
- Education: M. J. P. Rohilkhand University

Rajesh Agarwal is an Indian politician belonging to the Bharatiya Janata Party who is currently serving as its National Treasurer and former Minister of finance in the Government of Uttar Pradesh. He previously served as Cabinet Minister of trade tax and institutional finance in 2001, and as Deputy Speaker of Uttar Pradesh Legislative Assembly from 2003 to 2007. He then served as the Finance cabinet minister again from 2017 to 2019 in the Yogi Government. He resigned as cabinet minister after he had reached 75 years of age. BJP promoted him as the National Treasurer of BJP.

Agarwal was a member of the assembly elected from Bareilly Cantonment. He had continuously held the seat for 29 years in the Uttar Pradesh Legislative assembly. He holds several key positions in the Bharatiya Janata party.

== Positions held ==
Rajesh Agarwal has been elected to Uttar Pradesh Legislative Assembly for 6 terms.

#	From	To	Position
1	1993	1995	Member, 12th Legislative Assembly from Bareilly Assembly constituency
2	1996	2002	Member, 13th Legislative Assembly from Bareilly Assembly constituency
3	2002	2007	Member, 14th Legislative Assembly from Bareilly Assembly constituency
4	2007	2012	Member, 15th Legislative Assembly from Bareilly Assembly constituency
5	2012	2017	Member, 16th Legislative Assembly from Bareilly Cantonment Assembly constituency
6	2017	2022	Member, 17th Legislative Assembly from Bareilly Cantonment Assembly constituency
