= Baheri =

Baheri Bheri
- City
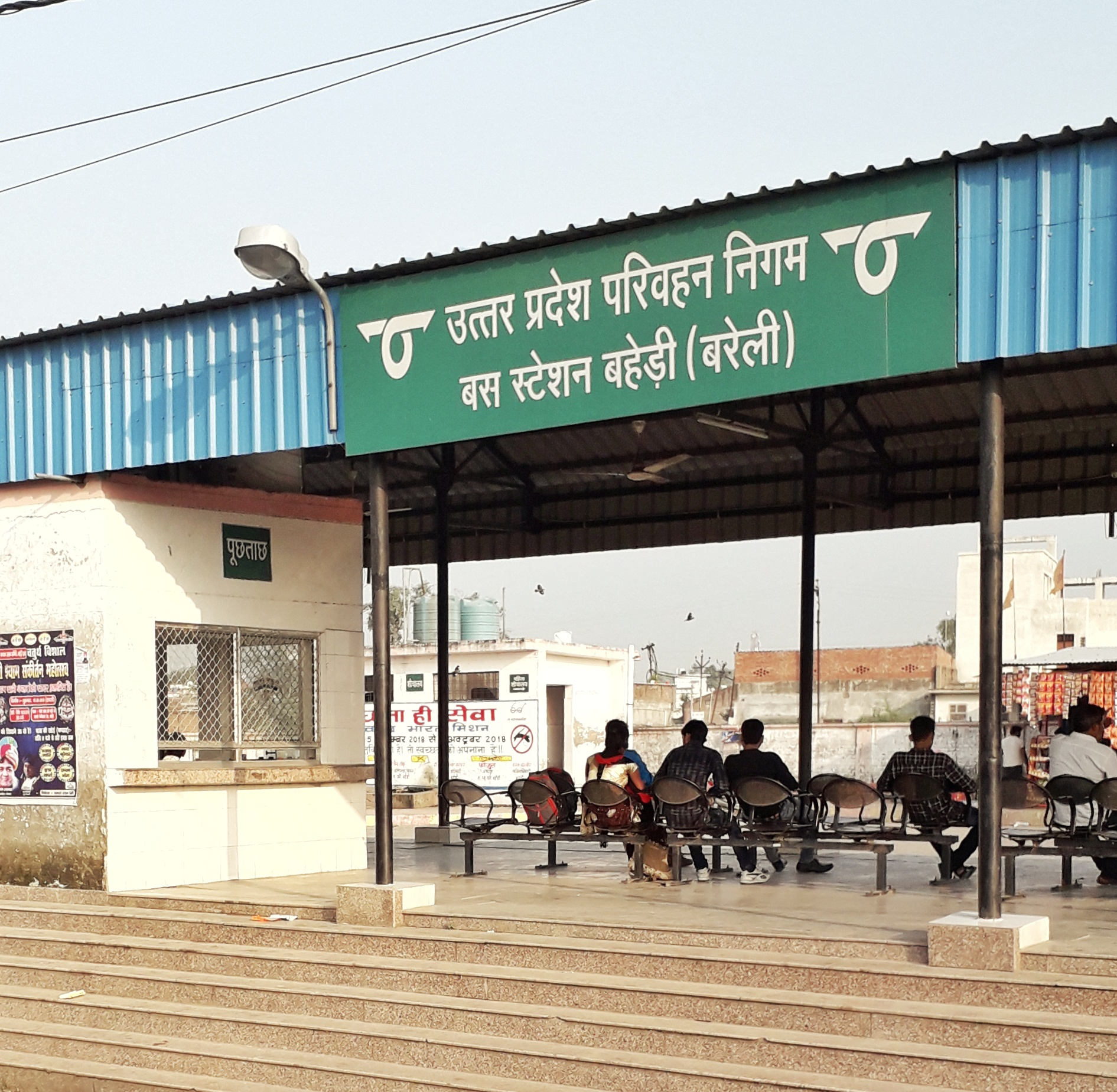
- Roadways Bus station, Baheri, Bareilly (U.P)
- Nickname: Textile City
- Location in Uttar Pradesh, India Baheri (India)
- Coordinates: 28.78°N 79.5°E
- Country: India
- State: Uttar Pradesh
- District: Bareilly
- Established: 2011

Government
  - MLA: Ataurrehman

Area
  - Total: 22 km^{2} (8.5 sq mi)
  - Rank: 84
- Elevation: 278 m (912 ft)

Population (2011)
  - Total: 68,410
  - Density: 3,100/km^{2} (8,100/sq mi)
- Demonym: Bahervi

Languages
  - Official: Khariboli, Hindi, Kumaoni, Urdu
- Time zone: UTC+5:30 (IST)
- PIN: Pin Code 243201
- Vehicle registration: HT 72
- Website: up.gov.in

Baheri is a city and municipality (nagarpalika) and tehsil in Bareilly district in the northern India state of Uttar Pradesh. It is 48 kilometres (30 mi) from Bareilly city, district headquarter. It is geographically located near the lower reaches of Gaula river. Located on the Highway connecting the Bareilly city to Nainital. The Town 300 kilometres (186 mi) north of the state capital, Lucknow, and 300 kilometres (186 mi) east of the national capital, New Delhi.

The city has good transportation connectivity from Bareilly and Uttarakhand, as it is a border city. It is well connected by trains and the state transport buses.The Baheri city lies in delavation because of the national highway going around the city a.k.a. Bypass.

== Geography ==
Baheri is located at 28.78°N 79.5°E. It has an average elevation of 271 metres (889 feet).

It is the last town of Uttarpradesh if you travel from Bareilly towards Nainital via Kiccha. It is also the largest Tehsil of Bareilly district.

== Demographics ==
As of 2011 India census, Baheri had a population of 68410. Males constitute 53% of the population and females 47%. Baheri has an average literacy rate of 85%, higher than the national average of 74%; with 87% of the males and 82% of females literate. 11% of the population is under six years of age.

Population:

- Total: 68,413
  - Males: 35,939
  - Females: 32,474

Age Distribution:

- Children (0-6 years): 9,731 (14.22% of total population)Census 2011 India

Sex Ratio:

- Overall: 904 females per 1,000 males
- Child Sex Ratio (0-6 years): 887 females per 1,000 males

Literacy Rate:

- Overall: 55.09
  - Male Literacy: 61.29
  - Female Literacy: 48.23%

== Architecture ==
The type of architecture here is Anglo-Indian Style with Mix of many. It also has some Mughal influence.

== Economy ==
The major economy is based on the cultivation and agriculture. There are many food processing industries also here.Major Industry is Sugarcane Industry named as Kesar Sugar mill baheri. It is one of the largest sugarcane mills in State of UP.

It also has State warehouse i.e. Mandi Samiti located in Shyamacharan Gautiya on Narayan Nagla road which purchases the produce from the farmers at Government declared Minimum support price.
