= Imran Masood =

Indian politician

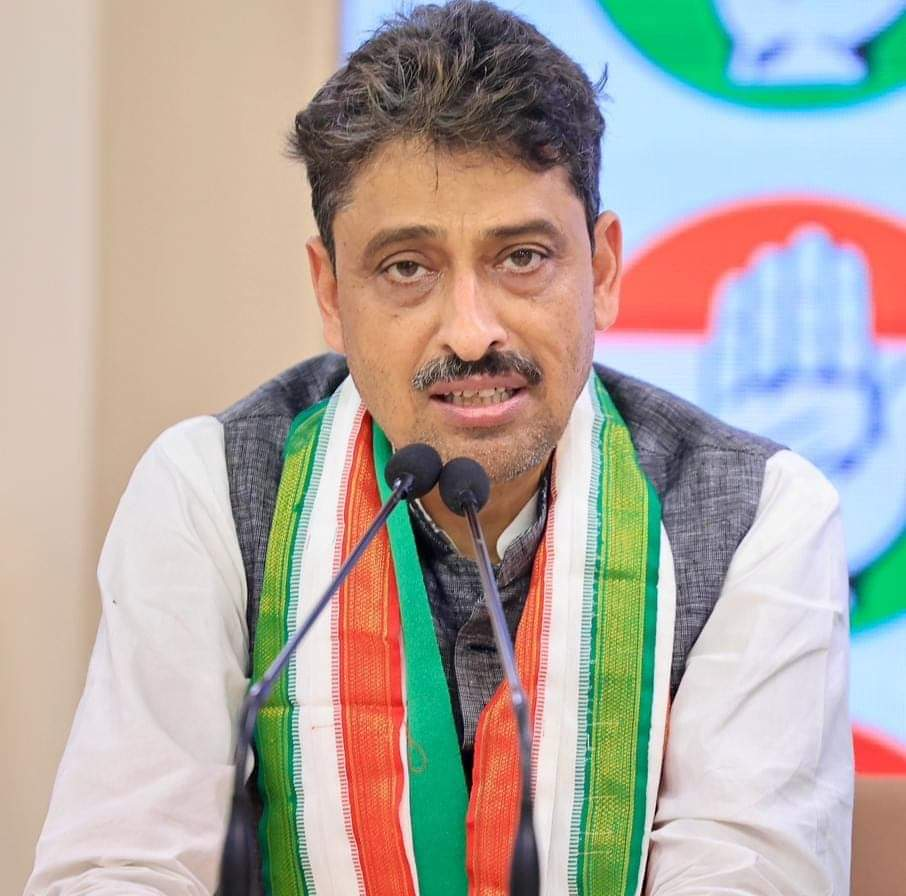

Member of Parliament, Lok Sabha
- Incumbent
- Assumed office 4 June 2024
- Preceded by: Haji Fazlur Rehman
- Constituency: Saharanpur

Member of the Uttar Pradesh Legislative Assembly
- In office 13 May 2007 – 9 March 2012
- Preceded by: Jagdish Singh Rana
- Succeeded by: Mahaveer Singh Rana
- Constituency: Muzaffarabad

Personal details
- Born: 21 April 1971 (age 55) Gangoh, Uttar Pradesh, India
- Party: Indian National Congress
- Other political affiliations: Samajwadi Party, Bahujan Samaj Party
- Spouse: Saima Masood
- Relations: Rasheed Masood
- Children: 5 daughters
- Education: HR Inter College Gangoh (High school)

Imran Masood (born 21 April 1971; Hindi pronunciation: [ɪmɾaːn̪ məsuːd̪]) is an Indian politician. He is currently serving Member of Parliament, Lok Sabha from Saharanpur. He has served as the Chairman of Saharanpur's Municipal Council and MLA from Muzzafarabad (now Behat) in Saharanpur District in the Uttar Pradesh legislative assembly.He is currently working as a working president of uttar pradesh Congress Committee.

He was a vice president of Indian National Congress, Uttar Pradesh. He was also a member of Advisory Council in Uttar Pradesh Congress. He served as the National Secretary of All India Congress Committee (AICC).He is working as a working state president of uttar pradesh Congress Committee

== Personal life ==
Imran Masood was born on 21 April 1971 in Gangoh, Saharanpur District, Uttar Pradesh. He is a nephew of former MP Rasheed Masood.

He is married to Saima Masood and has five daughters. His highest qualification, according to his affidavit, is intermediate and his profession is farming and agriculture in Saharanpur.

== Political career ==
Masood was given ticket from the Congress party from the Saharanpur Lok Sabha constituency for the 2014 Indian general election. In March 2014, a video clip surfaced in which Masood was seen threatening then BJP's Prime-Ministerial candidate, Narendra Modi. In the video clip, Masood was allegedly threatening to "chop" Modi "into pieces." Masood's partisans claim that this clip was six months old and had been deliberately leaked to polarize the electorate ahead of the Lok Sabha election. On 29 March 2014, he was arrested by for his hate speech against Narendra Modi. Later on, he was defeated by BJP candidate Raghav Lakhanpal.

He contested 2017 assembly election of UP and lost.

In the 2017 UP Vidhan Sabha elections Imran Masood fought from the Nakur Constituency. He lost to Dharam Singh Saini of BJP.

On 7 October 2023 Imran Masood again joined Indian National Congress. He was subsequently named the party's candidate from Saharanpur for the 2024 Indian general election. Masood won the election by a margin of 5.25% against former MP Raghav Lakhanpal.

=== Positions held ===
- Chairman - Nagar Palika Parishad, Saharanpur (2006–2007)
- MLA - Uttar Pradesh Legislative Assembly (2007–2012)
- Member - Privilege committee of Uttar Pradesh Legislative Assembly (2008–2009)
- Vice president of Uttar Pradesh Congress (2019-2020)
- Member of advisory council in Uttar Pradesh Congress (2020-2021)
- National secretary of All India Congress Committee (AICC) and secretary of Delhi (2021-2022)
- Member of Parliament (Saharanpur) (2024–present)
- Working President of Uttar pradesh Congress Committee ( 2026- Present)

== Elections contested ==
Year	Election Type	Constituency	Result	Vote percentage	Opposition Candidate	Opposition Party	Opposition vote percentage	Ref
2006	Chairman	Nagar Palika Parishad, Saharanpur	Won	43.60%	Harish Malik	BJP	40.60%	
2007	MLA	Muzaffarabad	Won	28.14%	Jagdish Singh Rana	SP	25.77%	
2012	MLA	Nakur	Lost	36.71%	Dharam Singh Saini	BSP	38.59%	
2014	MP	Saharanpur	Lost	34.15%	Raghav Lakhanpal	BJP	39.60%	
2017	MLA	Nakur	Lost	35.51%	Dharam Singh Saini	BJP	37.11%	
2019	MP	Saharanpur	Lost	16.81%	Haji Fazlur Rehman	BSP	41.74%	
2024	MP	Saharanpur	Won	44.6%	Raghav Lakhanpal	BJP	39.3%	
