= Masood Akhtar (politician) =

Indian politician

MLA in 17th Legislative Assembly of Uttar Pradesh
- In office March 2017 – March 2022
- Preceded by: Jagpal
- Succeeded by: Ashu Malik
- Constituency: Saharanpur

Personal details
- Born: 18 April 1962 (age 63) Bhaupur, Saharanpur, Uttar Pradesh, India
- Party: Samajwadi Party
- Parent: Aslam
- Education: Bachelor of Arts
- Alma mater: Aligarh Muslim University
- Occupation: Politician
- Profession: Politician

Masood Akhtar is an Indian politician who was a member of 17th Legislative Assembly of Uttar Pradesh of India. He represented the Saharanpur constituency of Uttar Pradesh and is a member of the Samajwadi Party.

== Early life and education ==
Akhtar was born 18 April 1962 in Bhaupur village of Saharanpur district of Uttar Pradesh to his father Aslam. In 1986, he married Shama Parveen, they have two sons and two daughters. He belongs to Backward Class (Muslim Garha) community. In 1982, he attended Aligarh Muslim University and attained Bachelor of Arts degree.

== Political career ==
Akhtar has been a member of the 17th Legislative Assembly of Uttar Pradesh. Between 2017 and 2022, he has represented the Saharanpur constituency and won elections from the Indian National Congress. He joined Samajwadi party with Imran Masood just before one month of 18th Legislative Assembly election of Uttar Pradesh (2022).

In 17th Legislative Assembly of Uttar Pradesh (2017) elections, he was elected MLA from Saharanpur by defeating Bahujan Samaj Party candidate Jagpal by a margin of 12,324 votes.

== Posts held ==
#	From	To	Position	Comments
01	March 2017	March 2022	Member, 17th Legislative Assembly of Uttar Pradesh	

== See also ==
- Uttar Pradesh Legislative Assembly
