= Raghav Lakhanpal =

Indian politician

Member of Parliament, Lok Sabha
- In office 2014–2019
- Preceded by: Jagdish Singh Rana
- Succeeded by: Haji Fazlur Rehman
- Constituency: Saharanpur

Member of Uttar Pradesh Legislative Assembly
- In office 2012–2014
- Preceded by: constituency established
- Constituency: Saharanpur Nagar
- In office 2007–2012
- Preceded by: Sanjay Garg
- Succeeded by: Jagpal
- Constituency: Saharanpur
- In office 2001–2002
- Preceded by: Nirbhay Pal Sharma
- Succeeded by: Dharam Singh Saini
- Constituency: Sarsawa

Personal details
- Born: 28 October 1974 Saharanpur, Uttar Pradesh, India
- Party: Bharatiya Janata Party
- Parent: Nirbhay Pal Sharma
- Education: International Management Institute, New Delhi
- Occupation: Agriculturist

Raghav Lakhanpal Sharma is an Indian politician. He was a member of the Lok Sabha elected in 2014 from Saharanpur as a candidate of the Bharatiya Janata Party.

== Life ==
He is educated at The Doon School and International Management Institute. He was the member of Uttar Pradesh Legislative Assembly thrice. He became a politician after the tragic murder of his father Nirbhay Pal Sharma in 2000 who was himself a Bhartiya Janta Party politician from Sarsawa. Raghav later stood for the by election and won handsomely but lost in the 2002 Assembly election from the same seat. He later won from Saharanpur Nagar seat in 2007 and reclaimed it in 2012 Assembly Polls before entering into Lok Sabha in a highly polarised election in which he defeated nearest Congress candidate by 65 thousand votes. He is also the Vice President of BJP's youth wing BJYM.

On 21 April 2017, Lakhanpal and BJP MLA Brijesh Choudhary were arrested along with a party member for alleged involvement in violence at Sadak Dudhli village in Saharanpur district.

On 22 December 2017 he moved a private member bill in the Lok Sabha seeking India must advocate a stringent population policy to overcome the rising population growth and disallow subsidies to those who produce more than two children.
