= Nirbhay Pal Sharma =

Indian politician

MLA, 13th Legislative Assembly
- In office Oct 1996 – Nov 2000
- Preceded by: Nirbhay Pal Sharma
- Succeeded by: Dr. Dharam Singh Saini
- Constituency: Sarsawa

MLA, 12th Legislative Assembly
- In office Dec 1993 – Oct 1995
- Preceded by: Mohd. Hasan Shah
- Succeeded by: Nirbhay Pal Sharma
- Constituency: Sarsawa

MLA, 09th Legislative Assembly
- In office Mar 1985 – Nov 1989
- Preceded by: Rulha Singh
- Succeeded by: Ram Sharan
- Constituency: Sarsawa

Personal details
- Born: Saharanpur (Uttar Pradesh)
- Died: 5 November 2000 Saharanpur
- Resting place: Saharanpur
- Citizenship: India
- Party: Bharatiya Janata Party
- Other political affiliations: Indian National Congress
- Spouse: Prakash Pal
- Children: Raghav Lakhanpal
- Profession: Politician

Nirbhay Pal Sharma was an Indian politician and member of the 09th, 12th and the 13th Legislative Assembly of Uttar Pradesh of India. Sharma represented the Sarsawa constituency of Uttar Pradesh (which is now called Behat (Assembly constituency)) and was a member of the BJP political party. Sharma was murdered on 5 November 2000 at his residence in Saharanpur.

== Personal life ==
Nirbhay Pal Sharma was born in Saharanpur.

== Political career ==
Nirbhay Pal Sharma had been in active politics since 1970s. He was a MLA for three terms. During the 09th and the 12th Legislative Assembly of Uttar Pradesh he was a member of the Indian National Congress whereas during the 13th Legislative Assembly he was a member of the Bharatiya Janata Party.

== Murder ==
On 5 November 2000, Sharma's residence in Officers Colony in Saharanpur was attacked by armed assailants allegedly belonging to the Bawaria tribe. Allegedly the attackers remained at his residence for 30 minutes and killed Sharma. It was also alleged that Nirbhay Sharma had called the police but the police did not respond on time.

== Posts Held ==
#	From	To	Position	Comments
01	1985	1989	Member, 09th Legislative Assembly	
02	1993	1995	Member, 12th Legislative Assembly	
03	1996	2000	Member, 13th Legislative Assembly	died during the term

== See also ==
- Behat (Assembly constituency)
- Sarsawa (Assembly constituency)
- Uttar Pradesh Legislative Assembly
- Government of India
- Politics of India
- Bharatiya Janata Party
- Indian National Congress
