= Sunder Lal =

Indian freedom fighter (c. 1923 – 1987)

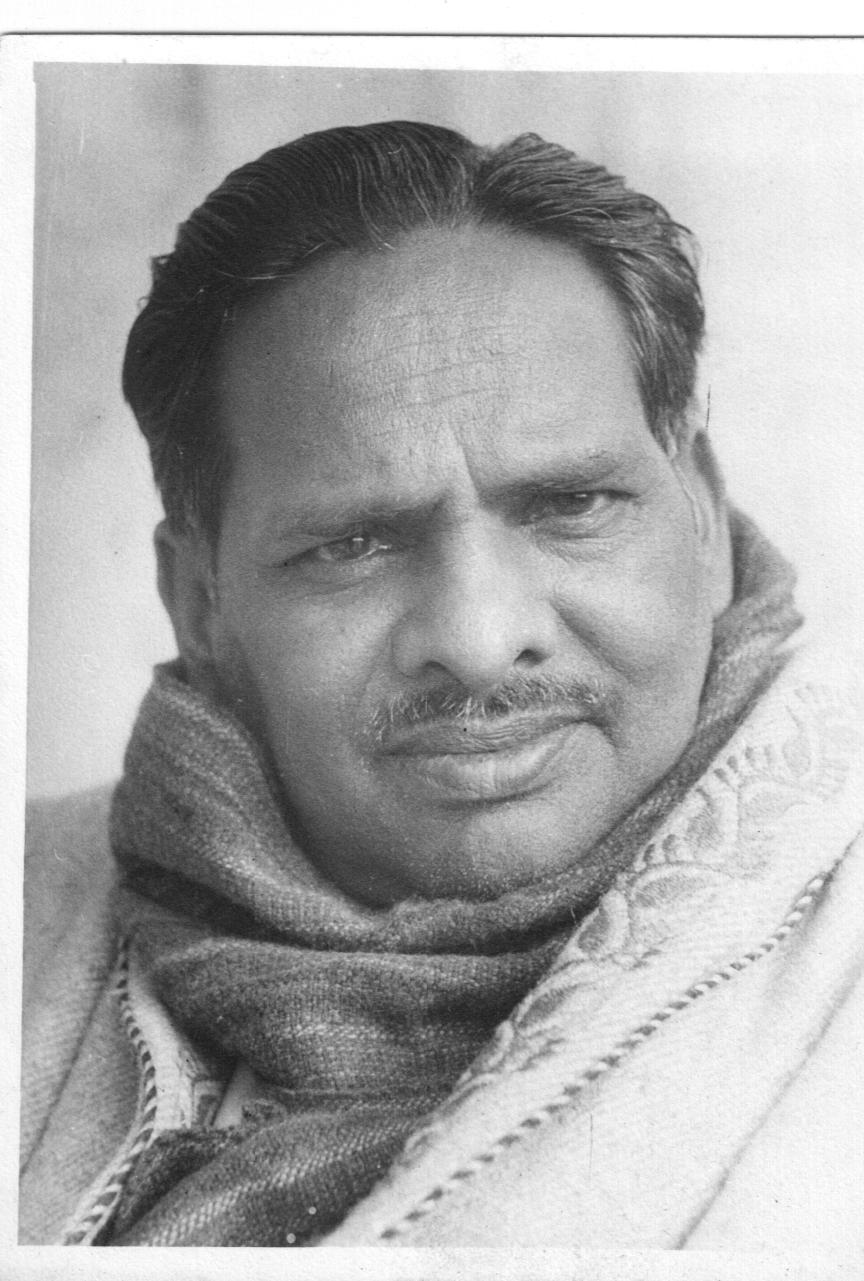

Member of Parliament, 5th Lok Sabha
- In office Mar 1971 – Jan 1977
- Preceded by: Himself
- Succeeded by: Rasheed Masood
- Constituency: Saharanpur

Member of Parliament, 4th Lok Sabha
- In office Mar 1967 – Dec 1970
- Preceded by: Himself
- Succeeded by: Himself
- Constituency: Saharanpur

Member of Parliament, 3rd Lok Sabha
- In office Apr 1962 – Mar 1967
- Preceded by: Himself
- Succeeded by: Himself
- Constituency: Saharanpur

Member of Parliament, 2nd Lok Sabha
- In office Apr 1957 – Mar 1962
- Preceded by: Himself
- Succeeded by: Himself
- Constituency: Saharanpur

Member of Parliament, 1st Lok Sabha
- In office Apr 1952 – Apr 1957
- Preceded by: None
- Succeeded by: Himself
- Constituency: Saharanpur

Personal details
- Born: c. 1923 Baliakheri village, Saharanpur district (Uttar Pradesh), India
- Died: 3 January 1987 New Delhi, India
- Party: Congress
- Profession: Politician

Sunder Lal (c. 1923 – 3 January 1987) was an Indian independence activist and politician. A member of the Indian National Congress, he served as a Member of Lok Sabha six times. For the first 5 Lok Sabha elections, Lal represented the Saharanpur constituency of Uttar Pradesh.

== Early life and education ==
Lal was born in village Baliakheri, Saharanpur district in the state of Uttar Pradesh. He participated in the Indian independence movement and after Indian independence he joined active politics.

== Political career ==
Lal was Member of Parliament for five straight terms (1952–1977) from Saharanpur, and after losing from Haridwar in 1977, won that seat in 1984. During the 1st Lok Sabha, Saharanpur constituency was differently defined. Lal represented the "Saharanpur (West) cum Muzaffarnagar (North)" constituency during the 1st Lok Sabha. He was a member of a Congress party. And was supposed to be close to Indira Gandhi and Hemvati Nandan Bahuguna.

== Posts held ==
| # | From | To | Position | Comments |
|---|---|---|---|---|
| 01 | 1952 | 1957 | Member, 1st Lok Sabha | From 'Saharanpur (West)]] cum Muzaffarnagar (North)' constituency. |
| 02 | 1957 | 1962 | Member, 2nd Lok Sabha | From Saharanpur (SC) constituency. |
| 03 | 1962 | 1967 | Member, 3rd Lok Sabha | – |
| 04 | 1967 | 1970 | Member, 4th Lok Sabha | – |
| 05 | 1971 | 1977 | Member, 5th Lok Sabha | From Saharanpur |
| 06 | 1984 | 1987 | Member, 8th Lok Sabha | From Haridwar (died mid-term) |

== See also ==
- 1st, 2nd, 3rd, 4th & 5th Lok Sabha
- Government of India
- Indian National Congress
- Lists of members of the Lok Sabha by year
- Lok Sabha
- Parliament of India
- Politics of India
- Saharanpur (Lok Sabha constituency)
