= Sarsawa Assembly constituency =

Former constituency of the Uttar Pradesh Legislative assembly in India

Coordinates: 30.02°N 77.40°E

Sarsawa
- Former constituency for the Uttar Pradesh Legislative Assembly

Constituency details
- Country: India
- Region: North India
- State: Uttar Pradesh
- Established: 1962
- Abolished: 2012

Sarsawa Assembly constituency was one of the 403 constituencies of the Uttar Pradesh Legislative Assembly, India. It was a part of the Saharanpur district and one of five assembly constituencies in the Saharanpur (Lok Sabha constituency).

Sarsawa Assembly constituency was into existence till 2008 as a result of the "Delimitation of Parliamentary and Assembly Constituencies Order, 2008" and demolished in 2012 and became part of Nakur, and some part included in Behat.

== Member of the Legislative Assembly ==
#	Term	Name	Party	From	To	Days	Comments	Ref
01	01st Vidhan Sabha	-	-	May-1952	Mar-1957	1,776	-	
02	02nd Vidhan Sabha	-	-	Apr-1957	Mar-1962	1,800	-	
03	03rd Vidhan Sabha	Shakuntala Devi	Indian National Congress	Mar-1962	Mar-1967	1,828	^{[note]}	
04	04th Vidhan Sabha	Mohd. Mahmood Ali Khan	Indian National Congress	Mar-1967	Apr-1968	402	^{[note]}	
05	05th Vidhan Sabha	Mohd. Mahmood Ali Khan	Indian National Congress	Feb-1969	Mar-1974	1,832	^{[note]}	
06	06th Vidhan Sabha	Mohd. Mahmood Ali Khan	Indian National Congress	Mar-1974	Apr-1977	1,153	^{[note]}	
07	07th Vidhan Sabha	Ajab Singh	Janata Party	Jun-1977	Feb-1980	969	^{[note]}	
08	08th Vidhan Sabha	Rulha Singh	Janata Party (Secular)	Jun-1980	Mar-1985	1,735	^{[note]}	
09	09th Vidhan Sabha	Nirbhay Pal Sharma	Indian National Congress	Mar-1985	Nov-1989	1,725	^{[note]}	
10	10th Vidhan Sabha	Ram Sharan	Janata Dal	Dec-1989	Apr-1991	488	^{[note]}	
11	11th Vidhan Sabha	Mohd. Hasan Shah	Janata Dal	Jun-1991	Dec-1992	533	^{[note]}	
12	12th Vidhan Sabha	Nirbhay Pal Sharma	Indian National Congress	Dec-1993	Oct-1995	693	^{[note]}	
13	13th Vidhan Sabha	Nirbhay Pal Sharma	Bharatiya Janata Party	Oct-1996	Mar-2002	1,967	^{[note]}	
14	14th Vidhan Sabha	Dr. Dharam Singh Saini	Bahujan Samaj Party	Feb-2002	May-2007	1,902	^{[note]}	
15	15th Vidhan Sabha	Dr. Dharam Singh Saini	Bahujan Samaj Party	May-2007	Mar-2012	1,762	^{[note]}	
Constituency abolished

== Election results ==
=== 15th Vidhan Sabha: 2007 General Elections. ===
2007 General Elections: Sarsawa
Party	Candidate	Votes	%	±%
BSP	Dr. Dharam Singh Saini	68,440	41.3	+28.5
SP	Mohd.Dilshad M	31,767	19.2	−
BJP	Melaram M	28,162	17.0	−
	Remainder twelve candidates	37,213	22.5	+64.7
Majority		36,673	22.1	+283.8
Turnout		165,582	n/a	+2.7
BSP hold		Swing	+8.3	

=== 14th Vidhan Sabha: 2002 General Elections ===
2002 General Elections: Sarsawa
Party	Candidate	Votes	%	±%
BSP	Dr. Dharam Singh Saini	53,262	33.0	−
BJP	Raghav M	43,708	27.1	−
SP	Mohd. Irshad M	41,695	25.9	−
	Remainder seven candidates	22,598	14.0	−18.4
Majority		9,554	5.9	+3,043
Turnout		161,263	68.1	−0.1
BSP hold		Swing	n/a	

=== 13th Vidhan Sabha: 1996 General Elections ===
1996 General Elections: Behat
Party	Candidate	Votes	%	±%
BJP	Nirbhay Pal Sharma	47,578	29.5	−16.7
INC	Saheb Singh	47,274	29.3	−
Independent	Mohd. Feeroz Aftab	38,866	24.1	−
	Remainder four candidates	27,710	17.2	+76.8
Majority		304	0.2	−98.4
Turnout		161,428	73.7	13.1
BJP hold		Swing	+2.77	

=== 12th Vidhan Sabha: 1993 General Elections ===
1993 General Elections: Behat
Party	Candidate	Votes	%	±%
INC	Nirbhay Pal Sharma	57,146	40.0	+96.6
BJP	Suresh	38,147	26.7	+22.9
JD	Mohd. Hasan Shah	31,762	22.3	−13.0
	Remainder eight candidates	15,675	11.0	+5.9
Majority		18,999	13.3	+316
Turnout		142,730	73.4	+29.1
INC hold		Swing	+13.7	

=== 11th Vidhan Sabha: 1991 General Elections ===
1991 General Elections: Behat
Party	Candidate	Votes	%	±%
JD	Mohd. Hasan Shah	36,518	32.2	+253
BJP	Suresh	31,051	28.1	−
INC	Nirbhay Pal Sharma	29,073	26.3	−37.2
	Remainder eleven candidates	14,797	13.4	+80.1
Majority		4,567	4.1	−5.9
Turnout		110,539	65.8	−4.4
JD hold		Swing	-12	

=== 10th Vidhan Sabha: 1989 General Elections ===
1989 General Elections: Behat
Party	Candidate	Votes	%	±%
JD	Ram Sharan	51,113	44.2	−
INC	Nirbhay Pal Sharma	46,262	40.0	−20.0
Independent	Mohd. Hasan Shah	10,089	8.7	−
	Remainder four candidates	8,214	7.1	+2.4
Majority		4,851	4.2	−82.4
Turnout		115,678	69.4	+14.4
JD hold		Swing	n/a	

=== 09th Vidhan Sabha: 1985 General Elections ===
1985 General Elections: Behat
Party	Candidate	Votes	%	±%
INC	Nirbhay Pal Sharma	57,798	57.1	+240
LKD	Aftab Ahamad	30,273	29.9	−
Independent	Raj Pal	5,047	5.0	−
	Remainder thirteen candidates	8,019	7.9	−51.8
Majority		27,525	27.2	+22,838
Turnout		101,137	68.8	+59.9
INC hold		Swing	+30.2	

=== 08th Vidhan Sabha: 1980 General Elections ===
1980 General Elections: Behat
Party	Candidate	Votes	%	±%
JP(S)	Rulha Singh	17,133	27.1	−
INC	Nirbhay Pal Sharma	17,013	26.9	−
Independent	Mehmood Hasan Shah	12,487	19.7	−
	Remainder eight candidates	16,626	26.3	+384.6
Majority		120	0.2	−97.2
Turnout		63,259	49.8	+8.6
JP(S) hold		Swing	n/a	

=== 07th Vidhan Sabha: 1977 General Elections ===
1977 General Elections: Behat
Party	Candidate	Votes	%	±%
JP	Ajab Singh	26,251	45.0	−
INC	Abdul Malik	21,980	37.7	−
Independent	Mohd. Mahmood Ali Khan	6,610	11.3	−80.2
	Remainder eight candidates	3,431	5.9	−66.4
Majority		4,271	7.3	−46.8
Turnout		58,272	52.2	−22.3
JP hold		Swing	n/a	

=== 06th Vidhan Sabha: 1974 General Elections ===
1974 General Elections: Behat
Party	Candidate	Votes	%	±%
INC	Mohd. Mahmood Ali Khan	33,442	44.6	+32.5
	Rulha Singh (Bharatiya Kranti Dal)	25,441	33.9	+74.3
	Inam M (Muslim League)	5,919	7.9	−
	Remainder eight candidates	10,201	13.6	−0.02
Majority		8,031	10.7	−24.6
Turnout		74,973	71.4	25.4
INC hold		Swing	+2.2	

=== 05th Vidhan Sabha: 1969 General Elections ===
1969 General Elections: Behat
Party	Candidate	Votes	%	±%
INC	Mohd. Mahmood Ali Khan	25,236	42.4	23.2
	Rulha Singh (Bharatiya Kranti Dal)	14,579	24.4	−
CPI	Rao Mukhtar Ali Khan	9,778	16.4	−
	Remainder five candidates	10,203	17.1	−43.0
Majority		10,657	17.8	−13.3
Turnout		59,796	62.7	+11.3
INC hold		Swing	+4.3	

=== 04th Vidhan Sabha: 1967 General Elections ===
1967 General Elections: Behat
Party	Candidate	Votes	%	±%
INC	Mohd. Mahmood Ali Khan	20,477	38.1	−
Independent	R. M. Ali	8,180	15.2	−
	R. Saran (Sanghata Socialist Party)	7,152	13.3	−
	Remainder six candidates	17,912	33.3	−
Majority		12,297	22.9	+21.4
Turnout		53,721	61.8	+36.3
INC hold		Swing	-10.7	

=== 03rd Vidhan Sabha: 1962 General Elections ===
1962 General Elections: Behat
Party	Candidate	Votes	%	±%
INC	Shakuntala Devi	19,224	48.8	−
SWA	Gainda Ram	9,097	23.1	−
Socialist Party (India)	Om Prakash	6,030	15.3	−
ABJS	Mallahah	5,058	12.8	−
Majority		10,127	25.7	−
Turnout		39,409	50.1	−
INC hold		Swing	-	

== See also ==
- Behat
- Government of Uttar Pradesh
- List of Vidhan Sabha constituencies of Uttar Pradesh
- Uttar Pradesh
- Uttar Pradesh Legislative Assembly

== Notes ==
- Behat Assembly constituency came into existence in 2008. Prior to 2008, this constituency was served / represented by Sarsawa (Assembly constituency) which now ceases to exist.
