= List of members of the 11th Lok Sabha =

Members of Lok Sabha (1996-98)

This is a list of members of the 11th Lok Sabha arranged by state or territory represented. These members of the lower house of the Indian Parliament were elected to the 11th Lok Sabha (1996 to 1998) at the 1996 Indian general election.

== Andhra Pradesh ==
INC (22) TDP (16) CPI (2) CPM (1) AIMIM (1)

Constituency		Member	Party
#	Name	Member	Party
1	Srikakulam	Kinjarapu Yerran Naidu	TDP
2	Parvathipuram (ST)	Pradeep Kumar Dev Vyricherla	INC
3	Bobbili	Kondapalli Pydithalli Naidu	TDP
4	Visakhapatnam	T. Subbarami Reddy	INC
5	Bhadrachalam (ST)	Sode Ramaiah	CPI
6	Anakapalle	Chintakayala Ayyanna Patrudu	TDP
7	Kakinada	Thota Gopala Krishna	TDP
8	Rajahmundry	Chitturi Ravindra	INC
9	Amalapuram (SC)	K. S. R. Murthy	INC
10	Narasapuram	Kothapalli Subbarayudu	TDP
11	Eluru	Bolla Bulli Ramaiah	TDP
12	Machilipatnam	Kaikala Satyanarayana	TDP
13	Vijayawada	Parvathaneni Upendra	INC
14	Tenali	Sarada Tadiparthi	TDP
15	Guntur	Rayapati Sambasiva Rao	INC
16	Bapatla	Ummareddy Venkateswarlu	TDP
17	Narasaraopet	Kota Saidaiah	TDP
18	Ongole	Magunta Parvathamma	INC
19	Nellore (SC)	Panabaka Lakshmi	INC
20	Tirupati (SC)	Nelavala Subrahmanyam	INC
21	Chittoor	N. Ramakrishna Reddy	TDP
22	Rajampet	Sai Prathap Annayyagari	INC
23	Kadapa	Y. S. Rajasekhara Reddy	INC
24	Hindupur	S. Ramachandra Reddy	TDP
25	Anantapur	Anantha Venkatarami Reddy	INC
26	Kurnool	Kotla Vijaya Bhaskara Reddy	INC
27	Nandyal	P. V. Narasimha Rao	INC
28	Nagarkurnool (SC)	Manda Jagannath	TDP
29	Mahbubnagar	Mallikarjun Goud	INC
30	Hyderabad	Sultan Salahuddin Owaisi	AIMIM
31	Secunderabad	P. V. Rajeshwar Rao	INC
32	Siddipet	Nandi Yellaiah	INC
33	Medak	M. Baga Reddy	INC
34	Nizamabad	G. Atmacharan Reddy	INC
35	Adilabad	Samudrala Venugopal Chary	TDP
36	Peddapalli (SC)	Gaddam Venkatswamy	INC
37	Karimnagar	L. Ramana	TDP
38	Hanamkonda	Kamaluddin Ahmed	INC
39	Warangal	Azmeera Chandulal	TDP
40	Khammam	Tammineni Veerabhadram	CPM
41	Nalgonda	Dharma Bhiksham	CPI
42	Miryalguda	Baddam Narsimha Reddy	INC

== Arunachal Pradesh ==
Ind (2)

Constituency		Member	Party
#	Name	Member	Party
1	Arunachal West	Tomo Riba	Ind
2	Arunachal East	Wangcha Rajkumar	Ind

== Assam ==
AGP (5) INC (5) BJP (1) CPM (1) ASDC (1) Ind (1)

Constituency		Member	Party
#	Name	Member	Party
1	Karimganj (SC)	Dwarka Nath Das	BJP
2	Silchar	Santosh Mohan Dev	INC
3	Autonomous District (ST)	Jayanta Rongpi	ASDC
4	Dhubri	Nurul Islam	INC
5	Kokrajhar (ST)	Louis Islary	Ind
6	Barpeta	Uddabh Barman	CPM
7	Guwahati	Prabin Chandra Sarma	AGP
8	Mangaldoi	Birendra Prasad Baishya	AGP
9	Tezpur	Iswar Prasanna Hazarika	INC
10	Nowgong	Muhi Ram Saikia	AGP
11	Kaliabor	Keshab Mahanta	AGP
12	Jorhat	Bijoy Krishna Handique	INC
13	Dibrugarh	Paban Singh Ghatowar	INC
14	Lakhimpur	Arun Kumar Sarmah	AGP

== Bihar ==
JD (22) BJP (18) SAP (6) CPI (3) INC (2) JMM (1) SP (1) Ind (1)

Constituency		Member	Party
#	Name	Member	Party
1	Bagaha (SC)	Mahendra Baitha	SAP
2	Bettiah	Madan Prasad Jaiswal	BJP
3	Motihari	Radha Mohan Singh	BJP
4	Gopalganj	Lal Babu Prasad Yadav	JD
5	Siwan	Mohammad Shahabuddin	JD
6	Maharajganj	Ram Bahadur Singh	SAP
7	Chhapra	Rajiv Pratap Rudy	BJP
8	Hajipur (SC)	Ram Vilas Paswan	JD
9	Vaishali	Raghuvansh Prasad Singh	JD
10	Muzaffarpur	Jai Narain Prasad Nishad	JD
11	Sitamarhi	Nawal Kishore Rai	JD
12	Sheohar	Anand Mohan Singh	SAP
13	Madhubani	Chaturanan Mishra	CPI
14	Jhanjharpur	Devendra Prasad Yadav	JD
15	Darbhanga	Ali Ashraf Fatmi	JD
16	Rosera (SC)	Pitambar Paswan	JD
17	Samastipur	Ajit Kumar Mehta	JD
18	Barh	Nitish Kumar	SAP
19	Balia	Shatrughan Prasad Singh	CPI
20	Saharsa	Dinesh Chandra Yadav	JD
21	Madhepura	Sharad Yadav	JD
22	Araria	Sukdeo Paswan	JD
23	Kishanganj	Taslimuddin	JD
24	Purnia	Pappu Yadav	SP
25	Katihar	Tariq Anwar	INC
26	Rajmahal (ST)	Thomas Hansda	INC
27	Dumka (ST)	Shibu Soren	JMM
28	Godda	Jagdambi Prasad Yadav	BJP
29	Banka	Giridhari Yadav	JD
30	Bhagalpur	Chunchun Prasad Yadav	JD
31	Khagaria	Anil Kumar Yadav	JD
32	Munger	Brahmanand Mandal	SAP
33	Begusarai	Ramendra Kumar	Ind
34	Nalanda	George Fernandes	SAP
35	Patna	Ram Kripal Yadav	JD
36	Arrah	Chandradeo Prasad Verma	JD
37	Buxar	Lalmuni Chaubey	BJP
38	Sasaram (SC)	Muni Lall	BJP
39	Bikramganj	Kanti Singh	JD
40	Aurangabad	Virendra Kumar Singh	JD
41	Jahanabad	Ramashray Prasad Singh	CPI
42	Nawada	Kameshwar Paswan	BJP
43	Gaya	Bhagwati Devi	JD
44	Chatra	Dhirendra Agarwal	BJP
45	Koderma	Rati Lal Prasad Verma	BJP
46	Giridih	Ravindra Kumar Pandey	BJP
47	Dhanbad	Rita Verma	BJP
48	Hazaribagh	M. L. Vishwakarma	BJP
49	Ranchi	Ram Tahal Choudhary	BJP
50	Jamshedpur	Nitish Bharadwaj	BJP
51	Singhbhum (ST)	Chitrasen Sinku	BJP
52	Khunti (ST)	Kariya Munda	BJP
53	Lohardaga (ST)	Lalit Oraon	BJP
54	Palamu (SC)	Braj Mohan Ram	BJP

== Goa ==
MGP (1) UGDP (1)

Constituency		Member	Party
#	Name	Member	Party
1	Panaji	Ramakant Khalap	MGP
2	Mormugao	Churchill Alemao	UGDP

== Gujarat ==
BJP (16) INC (10)

Constituency		Member	Party
#	Name	Member	Party
1	Kutch	Pushpdan Gadhavi	BJP
2	Surendranagar	Sanat Mehta	INC
3	Jamnagar	Chandresh Patel Kordia	BJP
4	Rajkot	Vallabhbhai Kathiria	BJP
5	Porbandar	Gordhanbhai Javia	BJP
6	Junagadh	Bhavna Chikhalia	BJP
7	Amreli	Dileep Sanghani	BJP
8	Bhavnagar	Rajendrasinh Rana	BJP
9	Dhandhuka (SC)	Ratilal Varma	BJP
10	Ahmedabad	Harin Pathak	BJP
11	Gandhinagar	Atal Bihari Vajpayee	BJP
11	Gandhinagar	Vijaybhai Patel	BJP
12	Mehsana	A. K. Patel	BJP
13	Patan (SC)	Mahesh Kanodia	BJP
14	Banaskantha	B. K. Gadhvi	INC
15	Sabarkantha	Nisha Chaudhary	INC
16	Kapadvanj	Jaysinhji Chauhan	BJP
17	Dohad (ST)	Somjibhai Damor	INC
18	Godhra	Shantilal Patel	INC
19	Kaira	Dinsha Patel	INC
20	Anand	Ishwarbhai Chavda	INC
21	Chhota Udaipur (ST)	Naranbhai Rathwa	INC
22	Baroda	Satyajitsinh Gaekwad	INC
23	Broach	Chandubhai Deshmukh	BJP
24	Surat	Kashiram Rana	BJP
25	Mandvi (ST)	Chhitubhai Gamit	INC
26	Bulsar (ST)	Manibhai Chaudhary	BJP

== Haryana ==
BJP (4) HVP (3) INC (2) Ind (1)

Constituency		Member	Party
#	Name	Member	Party
1	Ambala (SC)	Suraj Bhan	BJP
2	Kurukshetra	Om Prakash Jindal	HVP
3	Karnal	Ishwar Dayal Swami	BJP
4	Sonipat	Arvind Sharma	Ind
5	Rohtak	Bhupinder Singh Hooda	INC
6	Faridabad	Ram Chander Bainda	BJP
7	Mahendragarh	Rao Ram Singh	BJP
8	Bhiwani	Surender Singh	HVP
9	Hisar	Jai Parkash	HVP
10	Sirsa (SC)	Selja Kumari	INC

== Himachal Pradesh ==
INC (4)

Constituency		Member	Party
#	Name	Member	Party
1	Shimla (SC)	Krishan Dutt Sultanpuri	INC
2	Mandi	Sukh Ram	INC
3	Kangra	Sat Mahajan	INC
4	Hamirpur	Vikram Singh	INC

== Jammu and Kashmir ==
INC (4) BJP (1) JD (1)

Constituency		Member	Party
#	Name	Member	Party
1	Baramulla	Ghulam Rasool Kar	INC
2	Srinagar	Ghulam Mohammad Mir	INC
3	Anantnag	Maqbool Dar	JD
4	Ladakh	Phuntsog Namgyal	INC
5	Udhampur	Chaman Lal Gupta	BJP
6	Jammu	Mangat Ram Sharma	INC

== Karnataka ==
JD (16) BJP (6) INC (5) KCP (1)

Constituency		Member	Party
#	Name	Member	Party
1	Bidar (SC)	Ramchandra Veerappa	BJP
2	Gulbarga	Qamar ul Islam	JD
3	Raichur	Raja Rangappa Naik	JD
4	Koppal	Basavaraj Rayareddy	JD
5	Bellary	K. C. Kondaiah	INC
6	Davanagere	G. Mallikarjunappa	BJP
7	Chitradurga	P. Kondandaramaiah	JD
8	Tumkur	C. N. Bhaskarappa	JD
9	Chikballapur	R. L. Jalappa	JD
10	Kolar (SC)	K. H. Muniyappa	INC
11	Kanakapura	H. D. Kumaraswamy	JD
12	Bangalore North	C. Narayanaswamy	JD
13	Bangalore South	Ananth Kumar	BJP
14	Mandya	Krishna	JD
15	Chamarajanagar (SC)	A. Siddaraju	JD
16	Mysore	Srikantadatta Wadiyar	INC
17	Mangalore	V. Dhananjay Kumar	BJP
18	Udupi	Oscar Fernandes	INC
19	Hassan	Rudresh Gowda	JD
20	Chikmagalur	B. L. Shankar	JD
21	Shimoga	S. Bangarappa	KCP
22	Canara	Anantkumar Hegde	BJP
23	Dharwad South	I. G. Sanadi	INC
24	Dharwad North	Vijay Sankeshwar	BJP
25	Belgaum	Shivanand Koujalagi	JD
26	Chikkodi (SC)	Ratnamala Savanur	JD
27	Bagalkot	H. Y. Meti	JD
28	Bijapur	Basanagouda Rudragouda Patil	JD

== Kerala ==
INC (7) CPI (M) (5) IUML (2) CPI (2) RSP (1) KC (1) JD(S) (1) Independent (1)

Constituency		Member	Party
#	Name	Member	Party
1	Alleppey	V. M. Sudheeran	INC
2	Attingal	A Sampath	CPI(M)
3	Badagara	O. Bharathan	CPI(M)
4	Calicut	M. P. Veerendra Kumar	JD(S)
5	Ernakulam	Xavier Varghese Arakal	Independent
5	Ernakulam	Dr. Sebastian Paul	Independent
6	Idukki	A.C Jose	INC
7	Kasaragod	T. Govindan	CPI(M)
8	Kollam	N. K. Premachandran	RSP
9	Malappuram	E. Ahamed	IUML
10	Kottayam	Ramesh Chennithala	INC
11	Mavelikara	Prof. P.J. Kurien	INC
12	Adoor (SC)	Kodikunnil Suresh	INC
13	Muvattupuzha	P.C. Thomas	KEC
14	Ottapalam (SC)	S. Ajaya Kumar	CPI(M)
15	Palghat	N.N. Krishnadas	CPI(M)
16	Ponnani	Gulam Mehmood Banatwalla	IUML
17	Thrissur	P.C. Chacko	INC
18	Trichur	A.C. Jose	INC
18	Trichur	V.V. Raghavan	CPI
19	Trivandrum	K.V. Surendra Nath	CPI
20	Cannanore	Mullappally Ramachandran	INC

== Madhya Pradesh ==
BJP (28) INC (7) BSP (2) MPVC (1) AIICT (1) Ind (1)

Constituency		Member	Party
#	Name	Member	Party
1	Morena (SC)	Ashok Argal	BJP
2	Bhind	Ram Lakhan Singh	BJP
3	Gwalior	Madhavrao Scindia	MPVC
4	Guna	Vijaya Raje Scindia	BJP
5	Sagar (SC)	Virendra Khatik	BJP
6	Khajuraho	Uma Bharti	BJP
7	Damoh	Ramkrishna Kusmaria	BJP
8	Satna	Sukhlal Kushwaha	BSP
9	Rewa	Buddhasen Patel	BSP
10	Sidhi (ST)	Tilak Raj Singh	AIICT
11	Shahdol (ST)	Gyan Singh	BJP
12	Sarguja (ST)	Khelsai Singh	INC
13	Raigarh (ST)	Nand Kumar Sai	BJP
14	Janjgir	Manharan Lal Pandey	BJP
15	Bilaspur (SC)	Punnulal Mohle	BJP
16	Sarangarh (SC)	Paras Ram Bhardwaj	INC
17	Raipur	Ramesh Bais	BJP
18	Mahasamund	Pawan Diwan	INC
19	Kanker (ST)	Chhabila Netam	INC
20	Bastar (ST)	Mahendra Karma	Ind
21	Durg	Tarachand Sahu	BJP
22	Rajnandgaon	Ashok Sharma	BJP
23	Balaghat	Vishveshwar Bhagat	INC
24	Mandla (ST)	Faggan Singh Kulaste	BJP
25	Jabalpur	Baburao Paranjpe	BJP
26	Seoni	Prahlad Singh Patel	BJP
27	Chhindwara	Alka Nath	INC
27	Chhindwara	Sunder Lal Patwa	BJP
28	Betul	Vijay Khandelwal	BJP
29	Hoshangabad	Sartaj Singh	BJP
30	Bhopal	Sushil Chandra Varma	BJP
31	Vidisha	Shivraj Singh Chouhan	BJP
32	Rajgarh	Lakshman Singh	INC
33	Shajapur (SC)	Thawar Chand Gehlot	BJP
34	Khandwa	Nandkumar Singh Chauhan	BJP
35	Khargone	Rameshwar Patidar	BJP
36	Dhar (ST)	Chhatar Singh Darbar	BJP
37	Indore	Sumitra Mahajan	BJP
38	Ujjain (SC)	Satyanarayan Jatiya	BJP
39	Jhabua (ST)	Dileep Singh Bhuria	INC
40	Mandsaur	Laxminarayan Pandey	BJP

== Maharashtra ==
BJP (18) SHS (15) INC (15)

Constituency		Member	Party
#	Name	Member	Party
1	Rajapur	Suresh Prabhu	SHS
2	Ratnagiri	Anant Geete	SHS
3	Kolaba	Abdul Rahman Antulay	INC
4	Mumbai South	Jayawantiben Mehta	BJP
5	Mumbai South Central	Mohan Rawale	SHS
6	Mumbai North Central	Narayan Athawale	SHS
7	Mumbai North East	Pramod Mahajan	BJP
8	Mumbai North West	Madhukar Sarpotdar	SHS
9	Mumbai North	Ram Naik	BJP
10	Thane	Prakash Paranjape	SHS
11	Dahanu (ST)	Chintaman Vanaga	BJP
12	Nashik	Rajaram Godse	SHS
13	Malegaon (ST)	Kacharu Bhau Raut	BJP
14	Dhule (ST)	Sahebrao Bagul	BJP
15	Nandurbar (ST)	Manikrao Gavit	INC
16	Erandol	Annasaheb M. K. Patil	BJP
17	Jalgaon	Gunwantrao Sarode	BJP
18	Buldhana (SC)	Anandrao Adsul	SHS
19	Akola	Pandurang Fundkar	BJP
20	Washim	Pundlikrao Gawali	SHS
21	Amravati	Anant Gudhe	SHS
22	Ramtek	Datta Meghe	INC
23	Nagpur	Banwarilal Purohit	BJP
24	Bhandara	Praful Patel	INC
25	Chimur	Namdeo Diwathe	BJP
26	Chandrapur	Hansraj Ahir	BJP
27	Wardha	Vijay Mude	BJP
28	Yavatmal	Rajabhau Thakre	BJP
29	Hingoli	Shivaji Mane	SHS
30	Nanded	Gangadharrao Deshmukh	INC
31	Parbhani	Suresh Jadhav	SHS
32	Jalna	Uttamsingh Pawar	BJP
33	Aurangabad	Pradeep Jaiswal	SHS
34	Beed	Rajani Patil	BJP
35	Latur	Shivraj Patil	INC
36	Osmanabad (SC)	Shivaji Kamble	SHS
37	Solapur	Lingaraj Valyal	BJP
38	Pandharpur (SC)	Sandipan Thorat	INC
39	Ahmednagar	Maruti Devaram Shelke	INC
40	Kopargaon	Bhimrao Badade	BJP
41	Khed	Nivrutti Sherkar	INC
42	Pune	Suresh Kalmadi	INC
43	Baramati	Sharad Pawar	INC
44	Satara	Hindurao Naik Nimbalkar	SHS
45	Karad	Prithviraj Chavan	INC
46	Sangli	Madan Patil	INC
47	Ichalkaranji	Kallappa Awade	INC
48	Kolhapur	Udaysingrao Gaikwad	INC

== Manipur ==
INC (2)

Constituency		Member	Party
#	Name	Member	Party
1	Inner Manipur	Thounaojam Chaoba Singh	INC
2	Outer Manipur (ST)	Meijinlung Kamson	INC

== Meghalaya ==
INC (1) Ind (1)

Constituency		Member	Party
#	Name	Member	Party
1	Shillong	George Gilbert Swell	Ind
2	Tura	P. A. Sangma	INC

== Mizoram ==
INC (1)

Constituency		Member	Party
#	Name	Member	Party
1	Mizoram (ST)	C. Silvera	INC

== Nagaland ==
INC (1)

Constituency		Member	Party
#	Name	Member	Party
1	Nagaland	Imchalemba	INC

== Orrisa ==
INC (17) JD (3) SAP (1)

Constituency		Member	Party
#	Name	Member	Party
1	Mayurbhanj (ST)	Sushila Tiriya	INC
2	Balasore	Kartik Mohapatra	INC
3	Bhadrak (SC)	Muralidhar Jena	INC
4	Jajpur (SC)	Anchal Das	JD
5	Kendrapara	Srikant Kumar Jena	JD
6	Cuttack	Biju Patnaik	JD
6	Cuttack	Anadi Charan Sahu	INC
7	Jagatsinghpur	Ranjib Biswal	INC
8	Puri	Pinaki Misra	INC
9	Bhubaneswar	Soumya Ranjan Patnaik	INC
10	Aska	Biju Patnaik	JD
10	Aska	Naveen Patnaik	JD
11	Berhampur	P. V. Narasimha Rao	INC
12	Koraput (ST)	Giridhar Gamang	INC
13	Nowrangpur (ST)	Khagapati Pradhani	INC
14	Kalahandi	Bhakta Charan Das	SAP
15	Phulbani (SC)	Mrutyunjaya Nayak	INC
16	Bolangir	Sarat Pattanayak	INC
17	Sambalpur	Krupasindhu Bhoi	INC
18	Deogarh	Sriballav Panigrahi	INC
19	Dhenkanal	Kamakhya Prasad Singh Deo	INC
20	Sundargarh (ST)	Frida Topno	INC
21	Keonjhar (ST)	Madhab Sardar	INC

== Punjab ==
SAD (8) BSP (3) INC (2)

Constituency		Member	Party
#	Name	Member	Party
1	Gurdaspur	Sukhbuns Kaur	INC
2	Amritsar	Raghunandan Lal Bhatia	INC
3	Tarn Taran	Major Singh Uboke	SAD
4	Jalandhar	Darbara Singh	SAD
5	Phillaur (SC)	Harbhajan Lakha	BSP
6	Hoshiarpur	Kanshi Ram	BSP
7	Ropar (SC)	Basant Singh Khalsa	SAD
8	Patiala	Prem Singh Chandumajra	SAD
9	Ludhiana	Amrik Singh Aliwal	SAD
10	Sangrur	Surjit Singh Barnala	SAD
11	Bathinda (SC)	Harinder Singh Khalsa	SAD
12	Faridkot	Sukhbir Singh Badal	SAD
13	Firozpur	Mohan Singh	BSP

== Rajasthan ==
BJP (12) INC (12) AIICT (1)

Constituency		Member	Party
#	Name	Member	Party
1	Ganganagar (SC)	Nihalchand Meghwal	BJP
2	Bikaner	Mahendra Singh Bhati	BJP
3	Churu	Narendra Budania	INC
4	Jhunjhunu	Shish Ram Ola	AIICT
5	Sikar	Hari Singh Choudhary	INC
6	Jaipur	Girdhari Lal Bhargava	BJP
7	Dausa	Rajesh Pilot	INC
8	Alwar	Nawal Kishore Sharma	INC
9	Bharatpur	Maharani Divya Singh	BJP
10	Bayana (SC)	Ganga Ram Koli	BJP
11	Sawai Madhopur (ST)	Usha Meena	INC
12	Ajmer	Rasa Singh Rawat	BJP
13	Tonk (SC)	Shyam Lal Bansiwal	BJP
14	Kota	Dau Dayal Joshi	BJP
15	Jhalawar	Vasundhara Raje	BJP
16	Banswara (ST)	Tarachand Bhagora	INC
17	Salumber (ST)	Bheru Lal Meena	INC
18	Udaipur	Girija Vyas	INC
19	Chittorgarh	Jaswant Singh	BJP
20	Bhilwara	Subhash Chandra Baheria	BJP
21	Pali	Guman Mal Lodha	BJP
22	Jalore (SC)	Parsaram Meghwal	INC
23	Barmer	Sona Ram	INC
24	Jodhpur	Ashok Gehlot	INC
25	Nagaur	Nathuram Mirdha	INC

== Sikkim ==
SDF (1)

Constituency		Member	Party
#	Name	Member	Party
1	Sikkim	Bhim Prasad Dahal	SDF

== Tamil Nadu ==
Constituency	Member	Party
Arakkonam	A.M. Velu	Tamil Manila Congress (Moopanar)
Chengalpattu	Kulasekara Parasuraman	Dravida Munnetra Kazhagam
Chennai Central	Murasoli Maran	Dravida Munnetra Kazhagam
Chidambaram (SC)	V. Ganesan	Dravida Munnetra Kazhagam
Coimbatore	M. Ramanathan	Dravida Munnetra Kazhagam
Cuddalore	P.R.S. Venkatesan	Tamil Manila Congress (Moopanar)
Dharmapuri	P. Theertharaman	Tamil Manila Congress (Moopanar)
Dindigul	N.S.V. Chitthan	Tamil Manila Congress (Moopanar)
Gobichettipalayam	V.P. Shanmugasundaram	Dravida Munnetra Kazhagam
Karur	K. Natrayan	Tamil Manila Congress (Moopanar)
Krishnagiri	C. Narasimhan	Tamil Manila Congress (Moopanar)
Madras North	N.V.N. Somu	Dravida Munnetra Kazhagam
Madurai	A. Govindarajalu Subbaraman Rambabu	Tamil Manila Congress (Moopanar)
Mayiladuthurai	P.V. Rajendran	Tamil Manila Congress (Moopanar)
Nagapattinam (SC)	M. Selvarasu	Communist Party of India
Nagercoil	N. Dennis	Tamil Manila Congress (Moopanar)
Nilgiris	S. R. Balasubramaniam	Tamil Manila Congress (Moopanar)
Palani	Salarapatty Kuppusamy Kharventhan	Indian National Congress
Periyakulam	R. Gnanagurusamy	Dravida Munnetra Kazhagam
Pollachi (SC)	V. Kandasamy	Tamil Manila Congress (Moopanar)
Pudukkottai	P.N. Siva	Dravida Munnetra Kazhagam
Ramanathapuram	Subramanian Udayappan	Tamil Manila Congress (Moopanar)
Rasipuram (SC)	K. Kandasamy	Tamil Manila Congress (Moopanar)
Salem	R. Devadass	Tamil Manila Congress (Moopanar)
Sivaganga	Palaniappan Chidambaram	Indian National Congress
Sivakasi	V. Alagiri Samy	Communist Party of India
Sriperumbudur (SC)	T. Nagaratnam	Dravida Munnetra Kazhagam
Sriperumbudur	Thalikkottai Rajuthevar Baalu	Dravida Munnetra Kazhagam
Tenkasi (SC)	Mookaiah Arunachalam	Tamil Manila Congress (Moopanar)
Thanjavur	S.S. Palanimanickam	Dravida Munnetra Kazhagam
Tindivanam	Tindivanam G. Venkatraman	Dravida Munnetra Kazhagam
Tiruchengode	Dr. K.P. Ramalingam	Dravida Munnetra Kazhagam
Tiruchirappalli	Lourdusamy Adaikalaraj	Tamil Manila Congress (Moopanar)
Tirunelveli	D.S.A. Sivaprakasam	Dravida Munnetra Kazhagam
Tirunelveli	Dhanuskodi Athithan	Indian National Congress
Tiruvannamalai	Thiru Danapal Venugopal	Dravida Munnetra Kazhagam
Vandavasi	L. Balaraman	Tamil Manila Congress (Moopanar)
Vellore	P. Shanmugam	Dravida Munnetra Kazhagam

== Tripura ==
CPM (2)

Constituency		Member	Party
#	Name	Member	Party
1	Tripura West	Badal Choudhury	CPM
2	Tripura East (ST)	Baju Ban Riyan	CPM

== Uttar Pradesh ==
BJP (52) SP (16) BSP (6) INC (5) JD (2) AIICT (2) SJP (1) Ind (1)

Constituency		Member	Party
#	Name	Member	Party
1	Tehri Garhwal	Manabendra Shah	BJP
2	Garhwal	Satpal Maharaj	AIICT
3	Almora	Bachi Singh Rawat	BJP
4	Nainital	Narayan Datt Tiwari	AIICT
5	Bijnor (SC)	Mangal Ram Premi	BJP
6	Amroha	Pratap Singh Saini	SP
7	Moradabad	Shafiqur Rahman Barq	SP
8	Rampur	Begum Noor Bano	INC
9	Sambhal	D. P. Yadav	BSP
10	Badaun	Saleem Iqbal Shervani	SP
11	Aonla	Sarvraj Singh	SP
12	Bareilly	Santosh Gangwar	BJP
13	Pilibhit	Maneka Gandhi	JD
14	Shahjahanpur	Rammurti Singh Verma	INC
15	Kheri	Gendan Lal Kanaujia	BJP
16	Shahabad	Iliyas Azmi	BSP
17	Sitapur	Mukhtar Anis	SP
18	Misrikh (SC)	Paragi Lal	BJP
19	Hardoi (SC)	Jai Prakash Rawat	BJP
20	Lucknow	Atal Bihari Vajpayee	BJP
21	Mohanlalganj (SC)	Purnima Verma	BJP
22	Unnao	Devi Bux Singh	BJP
23	Rae Bareli	Ashok Singh	BJP
24	Pratapgarh	Ratna Singh	INC
25	Amethi	Satish Sharma	INC
26	Sultanpur	Devendra Bahadur Roy	BJP
27	Akbarpur (SC)	Ghanshyam Kharwar	BSP
28	Faizabad	Vinay Katiyar	BJP
29	Barabanki (SC)	Ram Sagar Rawat	SP
30	Kaiserganj	Beni Prasad Verma	SP
31	Bahraich	Padamsen Chaudhary	BJP
32	Balrampur	Satya Deo Singh	BJP
33	Gonda	Ketki Devi Singh	BJP
34	Basti (SC)	Sriram Chauhan	BJP
35	Domariyaganj	Brij Bhushan Tiwari	SP
36	Khalilabad	Surendra Yadav	JD
37	Bansgaon (SC)	Subhawati Paswan	SP
38	Gorakhpur	Mahant Avedyanath	BJP
39	Maharajganj	Pankaj Chaudhary	BJP
40	Padrauna	Ram Nagina Mishra	BJP
41	Deoria	Prakash Mani Tripathi	BJP
42	Salempur	Harivansh Sahay	SP
43	Ballia	Chandra Shekhar	SJP
44	Ghosi	Kalpnath Rai	Ind
45	Azamgarh	Ramakant Yadav	SP
46	Lalganj (SC)	Bali Ram	BSP
47	Machhlishahr	Ram Vilas Vedanti	BJP
48	Jaunpur	Rajkeshar Singh	BJP
49	Saidpur (SC)	Vidyasagar Sonkar	BJP
50	Ghazipur	Manoj Sinha	BJP
51	Chandauli	Ananda Ratna Maurya	BJP
52	Varanasi	Shankar Prasad Jaiswal	BJP
53	Robertsganj (SC)	Ram Shakal	BJP
54	Mirzapur	Phoolan Devi	SP
55	Phulpur	Jang Bahadur Patel	SP
56	Allahabad	Murli Manohar Joshi	BJP
57	Chail (SC)	Amrit Lal Bharti	BJP
58	Fatehpur	Vishambhar Nishad	BSP
59	Banda	Ram Sajeevan	BSP
60	Hamirpur	Ganga Charan Rajput	BJP
61	Jhansi	Rajendra Agnihotri	BJP
62	Jalaun (SC)	Bhanu Pratap Singh Verma	BJP
63	Ghatampur (SC)	Kamal Rani Varun	BJP
64	Bilhaur	Shyam Bihari Misra	BJP
65	Kanpur	Jagatvir Singh Drona	BJP
66	Etawah	Ram Singh Shakya	SP
67	Kannauj	Chandra Bhushan Singh	BJP
68	Farrukhabad	Sakshi Maharaj	BJP
69	Mainpuri	Mulayam Singh Yadav	SP
70	Jalesar	Ompal Singh Nidar	BJP
71	Etah	Mahadeepak Shakya	BJP
72	Firozabad (SC)	Prabhu Dayal Katheria	BJP
73	Agra	Bhagwan Shankar Rawat	BJP
74	Mathura	Chaudhary Tejveer Singh	BJP
75	Hathras (SC)	Kishan Lal Diler	BJP
76	Aligarh	Sheela Gautam	BJP
77	Khurja	Ashok Kumar Pradhan	BJP
78	Bulandshahr	Chhatrapal Singh Lodha	BJP
79	Hapur	Ramesh Chand Tomar	BJP
80	Meerut	Amar Pal Singh	BJP
81	Baghpat	Ajit Singh	INC
82	Muzaffarnagar	Sohanveer Singh	BJP
83	Kairana	Munawwar Hasan	SP
84	Saharanpur	Nakli Singh	BJP
85	Haridwar (SC)	Harpal Singh Sathi	BJP

== West Bengal ==
CPI(M) (22) INC (7) RSP (4) CPI (3) AIFB (3)

Constituency		Member	Party
#	Name	Member	Party
1	Alipurduars (ST)	Joachim Baxla	RSP
2	Arambagh (SC)	Anil Basu	CPI(M)
3	Asansol	Haradhan Roy	CPI(M)
4	Balurghat (SC)	Ranen Barman	RSP
5	Bankura	Basudeb Acharia	CPI(M)
6	Barasat	Chitta Basu	AIFB
7	Barrackpore	Tarit Baran Topdar	CPI(M)
8	Basirhat	Ajay Chakraborty	CPI
9	Berhampore	Pramothes Mukherjee	RSP
10	Bolpur	Somnath Chatterjee	CPI(M)
11	Burdwan	Balai Ray	CPI(M)
12	Calcutta North East	Ajit Kumar Panja	INC
13	Calcutta North West	Dr. Debiprosad Pal	INC
14	Contai	Prof. Sudhir Kumar Giri	CPI(M)
15	Coochbehar (SC)	Amar Roy Pradhan	AIFB
16	Darjeeling	Ratna Bahadur Rai	CPI(M)
17	Diamond Harbour	Samik Lahiri	CPI(M)
18	Dumdum	Nirmal Kanti Chatterjee	CPI(M)
19	Durgapur (SC)	Sunil Khan	CPI(M)
20	Hooghly	Rupchand Pal	CPI(M)
21	Jadavpur	Prof. Krishna Bose	INC
22	Jalpaiguri	Jitendra Nath Das	CPI(M)
23	Jangipur	Mohammad Idris Ali	INC
24	Jaynagar (SC)	Sanat Kumar Mandal	RSP
25	Jhargram (ST)	Rupchand Murmu	CPI(M)
26	Katwa	Mahboob Zahedi	CPI(M)
27	Krishnagar	Ajoy Mukhopadhyay	CPI(M)
28	Malda	A.B.A. Ghani Khan Choudhury	INC
29	Mathurapur (SC)	Prof. Radhika Ranjan Pramanik	CPI(M)
30	Midnapore	Indrajit Gupta	CPI
31	Murshidabad	Syed Masudal Hossain	CPI(M)
32	Nabadwip (SC)	Dr. Asim Bala	CPI(M)
33	Panskura	Geeta Mukherjee	CPI
34	Purulia	Bir Sing Mahato	AIFB
35	Raiganj	Subrata Mukherjee	CPI(M)
36	Serampore	Pradip Bhattacharya	INC
37	Tamluk	Jayanta Bhattacharya	INC
38	Uluberia	Hannan Mollah	CPI(M)
39	Vishnupur (SC)	Sandhya Bauri	CPI(M)

== Andaman & Nicobar Islands ==
INC (1)

Constituency		Member	Party
#	Name	Member	Party
1	Andaman & Nicobar Islands	Manoranjan Bhakta	INC

== Chandigarh ==
BJP (1)

Constituency		Member	Party
#	Name	Member	Party
1	Chandigarh	Satya Pal Jain	BJP

== Dadra & Nagar Haveli ==
INC (1)

Constituency		Member	Party
#	Name	Member	Party
1	Dadra and Nagar Haveli	Mohanbhai Delkar	INC

== Daman & Diu ==
INC (1)

Constituency		Member	Party
#	Name	Member	Party
1	Daman and Diu	Gopalbhai Tandel	INC

== Delhi ==
BJP (5) INC (2)

Constituency		Member	Party
#	Name	Member	Party
1	New Delhi	Jagmohan Malhotra	BJP
2	South Delhi	Sushma Swaraj	BJP
3	Outer Delhi	Krishan Lal Sharma	BJP
4	East Delhi	Baikunth Lal Sharma	BJP
4	East Delhi	Lal Bihari Tiwari	BJP
5	Chandni Chowk	Jai Prakash Aggarwal	INC
6	Delhi Sadar	Vijay Goel	BJP
7	Karol Bagh (SC)	Meira Kumar	INC

== Lakshadweep ==
INC (1)

Constituency		Member	Party
#	Name	Member	Party
1	Lakshadweep	P. M. Sayeed	INC

== Pondicherry ==
INC (1)

Constituency		Member	Party
#	Name	Member	Party
1	Puducherry	M. O. H. Farook	INC
