= Harora Must. =

- Village
- Village location on map Harora Must. (India)
- Coordinates: 29.995466°N 77.679381°E
- Country: India
- State: Uttar Pradesh
- Elevation: 276 m (906 ft)

Population (2011)
  - Total: 3,043

Languages
  - Official: Hindi
- Time zone: UTC+5:30 (IST)
- PIN: 247769
- STD: 0132
- Vehicle registration: UP11 XXXX
- Village code: 109314

Harora Must. is a village in Puwarka Tehsil of Saharanpur district in Indian state of Uttar Pradesh. It is about 583 kilometers from the state capital Lucknow and 193 kilometers from the national capital Delhi.

== Demography ==
Harora Must. has a total population of 3,043 people amongst 448 families. Sex ratio of Harora Aht. is 874 and child sex ratio is 818. Both the ratios are lower than that of Uttar Pradesh state average of 912 and 902 respectively.

Details	Male	Female	Total	Comments
Number of houses	-	-	448	(census 2011)
Adult	1,311	1,163	2,474	(census 2011)
Children (0–6 years)	313	256	569	(census 2011)
Total population	1,624	1,419	3,043	(census 2011)
Literacy	75.82%	55.20%	66.13%	(census 2011)

== Transportation ==
Harora Must can be accessed by road and by Indian Railways. The closest railway station to Harora Aht. is Sunehti Kharkhari railway station (9 km). The nearest operational airports are Dehradun airport (77 kilometers), Chandigarh Airport (144 kilometers) and Delhi airport (205 kilometers).

== See also ==
- Saharanpur district
- Harora Aht.
- Harora (Assembly constituency)
