= Harora Assembly constituency =

Constituency in Uttar Pradesh, India

Coordinates: 29.99°N 77.69°E

Harora

Constituency details
- Country: India
- Region: North India
- State: Uttar Pradesh
- District: Saharanpur
- Established: 1951 (cessation in 2008)

Harora was one of the 425 constituencies of the Uttar Pradesh Legislative Assembly, India. It was a part of the Saharanpur district and one of the assembly constituencies in the Saharanpur (Lok Sabha constituency). Harora Assembly constituency came into existence in 1957 and ceased to exist in 2008 as a result of "Delimitation of Parliamentary and Assembly Constituencies Order, 2008".

== Members of the Legislative Assembly ==
#	Term	Name	Party	From	To	Days	Ref
01	02nd Vidhan Sabha	Jai Gopal	Indian National Congress	Apr-1957	Mar-1962	1,800	
02	03rd Vidhan Sabha	Jai Gopal	Indian National Congress	Mar-1962	Mar-1967	1,828	
03	04th Vidhan Sabha	Shakuntala Devi	Indian National Congress	Mar-1967	Apr-1968	402	
04	05th Vidhan Sabha	Shakuntala Devi	Indian National Congress	Feb-1969	Mar-1974	1,832	
05	06th Vidhan Sabha	Shakuntala Devi	Indian National Congress	Mar-1974	Apr-1977	1,153	
06	07th Vidhan Sabha	Bimla Rakesh	Janata Party	Jun-1977	Feb-1980	969	
07	08th Vidhan Sabha	Bimla Rakesh	Janata Party	Jun-1980	Mar-1985	1,735	
08	09th Vidhan Sabha	Bimla Rakesh	Lok Dal	Mar-1985	Nov-1989	1,725	
09	10th Vidhan Sabha	Bimla Rakesh	Janata Dal	Dec-1989	Apr-1991	488	
10	11th Vidhan Sabha	Bimla Rakesh	Janata Dal	Jun-1991	Dec-1992	533	
11	12th Vidhan Sabha	Mohar Singh	Bharatiya Janata Party	Dec-1993	Oct-1995	693	
12	13th Vidhan Sabha	Mayawati	Bahujan Samaj Party	Oct-1996	May-2002	1,967	
13	14th Vidhan Sabha	Mayawati	Bahujan Samaj Party	Feb-2002	May-2007	1,902	
14	15th Vidhan Sabha	Jagpal	Bahujan Samaj Party	May-2007	Mar-2012	1,762	

== Election Results ==
=== 2007 ===
Uttar Pradesh Legislative Assembly Election, 2007
Party	Candidate	Votes	%	±%
BSP	Jagpal	82,343	49.65	▲1.89
SP	Vimala Rakesh	52,189	31.47	▲3.20
BJP	Jagpal Singh	21,382	12.89	▲4.25
Independent	Sushma Gautam	1,700	0.01	N/A
Others	Other 10 Candidates	8,202	4.94	N/A
Majority		30,154	18.18	▼1.31
Turnout				
BSP hold		Swing		

=== 2002 ===
Uttar Pradesh Legislative Assembly Election, 2002
Party	Candidate	Votes	%	±%
BSP	Mayawati	70,800	47.76	▼1.81
SP	Vimla Rakesh	41,899	28.27	▼5.25
Independent	Mohar Singh	15,378	10.37	N/A
BJP	Mahipal Singh	12,811	8.64	▼7.72
INC	Kusum	2,669	1.80	N/A
Others	Other 6 Candidates	4,678	3.15	N/A
Majority		28,901	19.49	▲3.44
Turnout		148,238	60.72	▼15.52
BSP hold		Swing		

=== 1996 ===
Uttar Pradesh Legislative Assembly Election, 1996
Party	Candidate	Votes	%	±%
BSP	Mayawati	84,647	49.57	N/A
SP	Vimla Rakesh	57,229	33.52	▲11.68
BJP	Padam Lata Nim	27,941	16.36	▼15.09
Independent	Nathlu Ram	499	0.29	N/A
Independent	Sushila	432	0.25	N/A
Majority		27,418	16.05	▲13.66
Turnout		171,754	76.24	▲6.37
BSP gain from BJP		Swing		

=== 1993 ===
Uttar Pradesh Legislative Assembly Election, 1993
Party	Candidate	Votes	%	±%
BJP	Mohar Singh	40,692	31.45	▲0.54
JD	Vipila Rakesh	37,601	29.06	▼18.19
SP	Nathuram	28,258	21.84	N/A
INC	Shakuntla	16,785	12.97	▲3.54
Others	Other 12 Candidates	3,847	2.91	N/A
Majority		3,091	2.39	▼13.95
Turnout		129,386	69.87	▲5.96
BJP gain from JD		Swing		

=== 1991 ===
Uttar Pradesh Legislative Assembly Election, 1991
Party	Candidate	Votes	%	±%
JD	Vimla Rakesh	48,644	47.25	N/A
BJP	Mohar Singh	31,825	30.91	N/A
INC	Chaman Lal Chaman	9,707	9.43	N/A
JP	Nathlu	4,740	4.60	N/A
BSP	Phool Singh	3,601	3.50	N/A
Others	Other 10 Candidates	4,440	4.31	N/A
Majority		16,819	16.34	N/A
Turnout		107,196	63.91	N/A
JD hold		Swing		

== See also ==
- Harora Aht.
- Harora Must.
- Government of Uttar Pradesh
- List of Vidhan Sabha constituencies of Uttar Pradesh
- Uttar Pradesh
- Uttar Pradesh Legislative Assembly
