= Harora Aht. =

- Village
- Village location on map Harora Aht. (India)
- Coordinates: 29.984628°N 77.685107°E
- Country: India
- State: Uttar Pradesh
- Elevation: 276 m (906 ft)

Population (2011)
  - Total: 3,919

Languages
  - Official: Hindi
- Time zone: UTC+5:30 (IST)
- PIN: 247769
- STD: 0132
- Vehicle registration: UP11 XXXX
- Village code: 109315

Harora Aht. is a village in Puwarka Tehsil of Saharanpur district in the Indian state of Uttar Pradesh. It is about 583 kilometers from the state capital Lucknow and 193 kilometers from the national capital Delhi.

== Demography ==
Harora Aht. has a total population of 3,919 people in 601 families. Sex ratio of Harora Aht. is 937 and child sex ratio is 952. Both the ratios are higher than that of Uttar Pradesh state average of 912 and 902 respectively.

== Transportation ==
Harora Aht. can be accessed by road and by Indian Railways. The closest railway station to Harora Aht. is Sunehti Kharkhari (8 km away). Nearest operational airports are Dehradun airport (77 kilometers), Chandigarh Airport (144 kilometers) and Delhi airport (204 kilometers).

== See also ==
- Harora Must.
- Harora (Assembly constituency)
