= Randol, Uttar Pradesh =

Village in Uttar Pradesh, India

Randol is a village situated in Muzaffarabad Block Saharanpur district of Uttar Pradesh state, India.

It is about 17.7 km from Saharanpur city and 24.3 km from Sarsawa. The Randol has population of 6,500 while 1,200 households as per report released by UCO bank.
