= Mukesh Choudhary (politician) =

Member of the Uttar Pradesh Legislative Assembly

Member of the Uttar Pradesh Legislative Assembly
- Incumbent
- Assumed office 10 March 2022
- Preceded by: Dharam Singh Saini
- Constituency: Nakur

Personal details
- Born: 15 March 1967 (age 59) Saharanpur, Uttar Pradesh, India
- Party: Bharatiya Janata Party
- Parent: Kirpal Singh Choudhary (father)
- Education: Chaudhary Charan Singh University
- Occupation: Agriculture
- Profession: Politician

Mukesh Choudhary is an Indian politician and a member of the 18th Legislative Assembly of Uttar Pradesh, representing the Nakur Assembly constituency of Uttar Pradesh. He is a member of the Bharatiya Janata Party.

== Early life and education ==
Mukesh Choudhary was born to a Hindu Gujjar family on 15 March 1967 in Saharanpur, Uttar Pradesh, in the family of Kirpal Singh Choudhary. Mukesh grew up in Saharanpur and graduated in Agriculture from Chaudhary Charan Singh University, Meerut.

== Political career ==
In the 2022 Uttar Pradesh Legislative Assembly election, Choudhary represented Bharatiya Janata Party as a candidate from the Nakur Assembly constituency and defeated Dharam Singh Saini of the Samajwadi Party by a margin of 155 votes.

== Posts held ==
#	From	To	Position	Comments
01	2022	Incumbent	Member, 18th Legislative Assembly	

== See also ==
- Nakur Assembly constituency
- 18th Uttar Pradesh Assembly
- Uttar Pradesh Legislative Assembly
