= Yashpal Singh =

Yashpal Singh may refer to:

- Yashpal Singh (cricketer)
- Yashpal Singh (politician)
