= Naresh Saini =

Indian politician

Naresh Singh Saini

MLA, 17th Legislative Assembly
- In office March 2017 – 10 March 2022
- Preceded by: Mahaveer Singh Rana
- Succeeded by: Umar Ali Khan
- Constituency: Behat

Personal details
- Born: 14 June 1964 (age 62) Mubarikpur, Gangoh, Uttar Pradesh
- Party: Bharatiya Janata Party (2022-Present)
- Other political affiliations: Indian National Congress (2012-2022)
- Spouse: Usha Saini
- Children: 1 son and 2 daughters.
- Parent: Shri Shobharam Saini (father)
- Education: Post Graduate
- Profession: Agriculturist & Politician

Naresh Saini is an Indian politician and was a member of the 17th Legislative Assembly of Uttar Pradesh of India. Saini represented the Behat constituency of Uttar Pradesh. He won over Indian National Congress ticket.

== Early life and education ==
Naresh Saini was born in Mubarikpur, a small village near Gangoh in the state of Uttar Pradesh. He has earned M.A. in political science from Meerut University. Saini is an agriculturist by profession.

== Political career ==
Naresh Saini joined INC in 2012 with Imran Masood. Naresh contested 16th Legislative Assembly of Uttar Pradesh election from Behat but lost to Mahaveer Rana by a narrow margin of 514 votes, but in 2017 Uttar pradesh Assembly election, Saini won Behat assembly with a margin of more than 25000 votes and became MLA. His wife Usha has also served as Zila panchayat member in Saharanpur district. He joined BJP on 12 January 2022 ahead of 2022 assembly election.

== Posts Held ==
#	From	To	Position	Comments
01	2017	10 March 2022	Member, 17th Legislative Assembly	

== See also ==
- Behat (Assembly constituency)
- Uttar Pradesh Legislative Assembly
- Indian National Congress
- Imran Masood
