= Mansoor Ali Khan (Uttar Pradesh politician) =

Indian politician

Member of Parliament, Lok Sabha
- In office 1999–2004
- Preceded by: Nakli Singh
- Succeeded by: Rasheed Masood
- Constituency: Saharanpur

Personal details
- Born: August 14, 1941 Mussoorie, British India
- Died: 15 August 2018 (aged 77) New Delhi, India
- Resting place: Saharanpur
- Citizenship: India
- Party: Bahujan Samaj Party
- Spouse: Tehmina Khan
- Children: 3 sons
- Parents: Wadud Ali Khan (father); Sultan Jehan Begum (mother)
- Education: National Institute of Technology, Srinagar
- Profession: Engineer; Agriculturist; Horticulturist; Social worker; Politician
- Committees: Member of one committee

Mansoor Ali Khan was an Indian politician and is Member of Parliament of India. He was a member of the 13th Lok Sabha representing the Saharanpur constituency of Uttar Pradesh. He comes from an old aristocratic family.

== Early life and education ==
Khan was born in Mussoorie in the (then) state of Uttar Pradesh (Mussoorie is now a part of Uttarakhand). He attended the National Institute of Technology, Srinagar and attained Bachelor of Engineering degree. Khan worked as an Engineer and Agriculturist prior to joining politics.

== Political career ==
Khan has been active in politics since 1980s. However, as Member of Parliament, he has served only one term. Prior to this, he was also a member of the Zila Parishad.

== Posts held ==
#	From	To	Position	Comments
01	1999	2004	Member, 13th Lok Sabha	-
02	1999	2000	Member, Committee on Defence	-

== See also ==
- 13th Lok Sabha
- Bahujan Samaj Party
- Government of India
- Lok Sabha
- Parliament of India
- Politics of India
- Saharanpur (Lok Sabha constituency)
- Uttar Pradesh Legislative Assembly
