= Jagdish Singh Rana =

Indian politician (1954–2021)

Member of the Indian Parliament for Saharanpur
- In office 2009–2014
- Preceded by: Rasheed Masood
- Succeeded by: Raghav Lakhanpal
- Constituency: Saharanpur

Member of the Uttar Pradesh Legislative Assembly
- In office 2002–2007
- Preceded by: Self
- Succeeded by: Imran Masood
- Constituency: Muzaffarabad
- In office 1996-2002
- Preceded by: Rani Devlata
- Succeeded by: self
- Constituency: Muzaffarabad
- In office 1991-1993
- Preceded by: Mohammad Aslam Khan
- Succeeded by: Rani Devlata
- Constituency: Muzaffarabad

Personal details
- Born: 28 August 1954 Saharanpur, Uttar Pradesh, India
- Died: 19 April 2021 (aged 66) Saharanpur, Uttar Pradesh, India
- Party: Bahujan Samaj Party
- Other political affiliations: Bharatiya Janata Party
- Spouse: Santosh Rana (m. 1972)
- Children: 3
- Occupation: Agriculturist

Jagdish Singh Rana (28 August 1954 – 19 April 2021) was a member of the 15th Lok Sabha of India. He represented the Saharanpur constituency of Uttar Pradesh as a member of the Bahujan Samaj Party. He joined the Bharatiya Janata Party (BJP) in May 2016 ahead of the 2017 Uttar Pradesh Legislative elections.

== Personal life ==
Rana was born to a Rajput family in Muradnagar of Saharanpur district to Harkesh Singh Rana and Krishna Devi on 28 August 1954.

Rana died on 19 April 2021, from COVID-19.

== Elections contested ==
Year	Election Type	Constituency	Result	Vote percentage	Opposition Candidate	Opposition Party	Opposition vote percentage	Ref
1991	MLA	Muzaffarabad	Won	42.98%	Chander Pal Singh	BJP	40.91%	
1993	MLA	Muzaffarabad	Lost	27.08%	Rani Deolata	BJP	34.68%	
1996	MLA	Muzaffarabad	Won	43.54%	Iqbal	BSP	29.26%	
2002	MLA	Muzaffarabad	Won	39.08%	Rao Mohd Naim Khan	BSP	32.66%	
2007	MLA	Muzaffarabad	Lost	25.77%	Imran Masood	IND	28.13%	
2009	MP	Saharanpur	Won	43.21%	Rasheed Masood	SP	32.87%	
2014	MP	Saharanpur	Lost	19.67%	Raghav Lakhanpal Sharma	BJP	39.59%	
