= Muzaffarabad Assembly constituency =

Constituency of the Uttar Pradesh Legislative Assembly

Coordinates: 30.12°N 77.71°E

Muzaffarabad
- Former constituency for the Uttar Pradesh Legislative Assembly

Constituency details
- Country: India
- Region: North India
- State: Uttar Pradesh
- District: Saharanpur
- Abolished: 2012

Muzaffarabad Assembly constituency was one of the 403 constituencies of the Uttar Pradesh Legislative Assembly, India. It was a part of the Saharanpur district and one of five assembly constituencies in the Saharanpur (Lok Sabha constituency).

Muzaffarabad Assembly constituency was demolished in 2008 as a result of the "Delimitation of Parliamentary and Assembly Constituencies Order, 2008" and renamed Behat Assembly constituency.

== Members of the Legislative Assembly ==
Election	Name	Party
1974	Mohd Aslam	Indian National Congress
1977	Haji Shamshad Ahmad	Janata Party
1980	Amar Singh	Independent politician
1984	Mohd Aslam Khan	Indian National Congress
1989	Mohd Aslam Khan	Janata Dal
1991	Jagdish Singh Rana	Janata Dal
1993	Rani Deolata	Bharatiya Janata Party
1996	Jagdish Singh Rana	Samajwadi Party
2002	Jagdish Singh Rana	Samajwadi Party
2007	Imran Masood	Independent politician

== Election results ==
=== 15th Vidhan Sabha: 2007 General Elections ===
2007 General Elections: Muzaffarabad
Party	Candidate	Votes	%	±%
Independent	IMRAN MASOOD	43,835	-	−
SP	JAGDISH SINGH RANA	40152		−
BSP	HAJI AHSAN	36860		−
BJP	SUSHIL SAINI	24567		−
	Remainder 12 candidates	10367		−
Majority		3683	-	−
Turnout		155781	-	+
Independent hold		Swing	-	

=== 14th Vidhan Sabha: 2002 General Elections ===
2002 General Elections: Muzaffarabad
Party	Candidate	Votes	%	±%
SP	JAGDISH SINGH RANA	51914	39.08	−
BSP	RAOMOHD NEAIM KHAN	43381	32.66	−
BJP	THAKUR CHANDER PAL SINGH	24786	18.66	−
	Remainder 2 candidates	6800	5	−
Majority		8533	-	−
Turnout		132766	38.3	
SP hold		Swing	-	

== See also ==
- Behat
- Government of Uttar Pradesh
- List of Vidhan Sabha constituencies of Uttar Pradesh
- Uttar Pradesh
- Uttar Pradesh Legislative Assembly

== Notes ==
- Behat Assembly constituency came into existence in 2008. Prior to 2008, this constituency was served / represented by Sarsawa (Assembly constituency) which now ceases to exist.
