= Rampur Maniharan Assembly constituency =

Constituency of the Uttar Pradesh legislative assembly in India

Rampur Maniharan
- Constituency No. 6 for the Uttar Pradesh Legislative Assembly

Constituency details
- Country: India
- Region: North India
- State: Uttar Pradesh
- District: Saharanpur
- Total electors: 266,686 (2012)
- Reservation: SC

Member of Legislative Assembly
- 18th Uttar Pradesh Legislative Assembly
- Incumbent Devendra Kumar Nim
- Party: Bharatiya Janata Party
- Elected year: 2017

Rampur Maniharan Assembly constituency is one of the 403 constituencies of the Uttar Pradesh Legislative Assembly, India. It is a part of the Saharanpur district and one of the five assembly constituencies in the Saharanpur Lok Sabha constituency. First assembly election in this assembly constituency was conducted in 2012 after the constituency came into existence in the year 2008 as a result of the "Delimitation of Parliamentary and Assembly Constituencies Order, 2008".

== Wards / Areas ==
Extent of Rampur Maniharan Assembly is Nagal, Rampur & Rampur Maniharan NP of Deoband tehsil; Landhora Gujjar, Chandena, Kankar Kooi, Sabdalpur Shivdaspur, Chhid Bana, Kapasa, Lakhnaur, Dabki Junnardar, Hasanpur Bhalaswa, Nalheda Gujjar, Sahajwa, Beetiya, Malhipur, Chunehti Gada, Mubarakpur & Sheikhpura Kadeem of Saharanpur district.

== Members of the Legislative Assembly ==
Year	Member	Party
Till 2012 : Constituency did not exist
2012	Ravinder Kumar Molhu	Bahujan Samaj Party
2017	Devendra Kumar Nim	Bharatiya Janata Party
2022	Devendra Kumar Nim	Bharatiya Janata Party

== Election results ==
=== 2027 ===
2027 Uttar Pradesh Legislative Assembly election: Rampur Maniharan
Party	Candidate	Votes	%	±%
NDA				
INDIA				
BSP				
NOTA	None of the above			
Majority				
Turnout				
gain from		Swing		

=== 2022 ===
2022 Uttar Pradesh Legislative Assembly election: Rampur Maniharan
Party	Candidate	Votes	%	±%
BJP	Devendra Kumar Nim	89,109	38.37	+3.43
BSP	Ravinder Kumar Molhu	68,516	29.5	−5.17
RLD	Vivek Kant	64,864	27.93	+27.61
ASP(KR)	Brijpal Singh	4,606	1.98	
NOTA	None of the above	670	0.29	−0.1
Majority		20,593	8.87	+8.6
Turnout		232,233	71.71	−1.73
BJP hold		Swing		

=== 2017 ===
2017 Assembly Elections: Rampur Maniharan
Party	Candidate	Votes	%	±%
BJP	Devendra Kumar Nim	76,465	34.94	
BSP	Ravinder Kumar Molhu	75,870	34.67	
INC	Vishva Chhotan	61,787	28.24	
NOTA	None of the above	856	0.39	
Majority		595	0.27	
Turnout		218,831	73.44	
BJP gain from BSP		Swing		

=== 2012 ===
2012 Assembly Elections: Rampur Maniharan
Party	Candidate	Votes	%	±%
BSP	Ravinder Kumar Molhu	77,274	39.53	
INC	Vinod Tejyan	50,668	25.92	
SP	Vishva Chhotan	47,492	24.30	
BJP	Rakesh Valmiki	16,395	8.39	
	Remaining 6 candidates	3,639	1.86	
Majority		26,606	13.61	
Turnout		195,468	73.30	
BSP hold		Swing		

== See also ==
- Saharanpur district
- Saharanpur Lok Sabha constituency
- Government of Uttar Pradesh
- List of Vidhan Sabha constituencies of Uttar Pradesh
- Uttar Pradesh
- Uttar Pradesh Legislative Assembly
