= Ravinder Kumar Molhu =

Indian politician

Honourable Ravinder Kumar Molhu

MLA, 16th Legislative Assembly
- In office March 2012 – March 2017
- Preceded by: None
- Succeeded by: Devendra Kumar Nim
- Constituency: Rampur Maniharan

MLA, 15th Legislative Assembly
- In office May 2007 – Mar 2012
- Preceded by: Ilam Singh
- Succeeded by: None
- Constituency: Nagal

Personal details
- Born: Ravinder Kumar; 21 July 1969 (age 56) Village Hasanpur, Saharanpur district
- Party: Bharatiya Janata Party
- Other political affiliations: Bahujan Samaj Party
- Spouse: Chandrakanta (Wife)
- Parent: Amar Singh (Father)
- Profession: Agriculturist & politician

Ravinder Kumar Molhu (born Ravinder Kumar) is an Indian politician and member of the 15th and the 16th Legislative assemblies of Uttar Pradesh. Molhu is a member of the Bahujan Samaj Party and represented Rampur Maniharan constituency of Uttar Pradesh during the Sixteenth Legislative Assembly of Uttar Pradesh.

== Early life and education ==
Ravinder Kumar Molhu was born in the village Hasanpur, Saharanpur district, India in 1969. His highest attained education is high school. Molhu belongs to the SC category and belongs to Jatav community. Prior to entering politics, he was an agriculturist by profession.

== Political career ==
Ravinder Kumar Molhu has been a MLA for two straight terms (since 2007). During his first term, he contested from Nagal (Assembly constituency) (ceased to exist after "Delimitation of Parliamentary and Assembly Constituencies Order, 2008"). He currently represents Rampur Maniharan (Assembly constituency) and is a member of the Bahujan Samaj Party.

In Seventeenth Legislative Assembly of Uttar Pradesh 2017 he lost to Bhartiya Janata Party candidate Devendra Kumar Nim by a margin of 595 votes.

== Posts held ==
#	From	To	Position	Comments
01	2007	2012	Member, 15th Legislative Assembly	
02	2012	2017	Member, 16th Legislative Assembly	

== See also ==
- Rampur Maniharan
- Uttar Pradesh Legislative Assembly
- 16th Legislative Assembly of Uttar Pradesh
- 15th Legislative Assembly of Uttar Pradesh
- Politics of India
- Bahujan Samaj Party
