= Rasheed Masood =

Indian politician (1947–2020)

MP 6th, 7th, 9th, 10th, 14th Lok Sabha
- Constituency: Saharanpur

Personal details
- Born: 15 August 1947 Gangoh, United Provinces, India
- Died: 5 October 2020 (aged 73) Saharanpur, Uttar Pradesh, India
- Party: Indian National Congress
- Other party: Janata Dal, Janata Party
- Spouse: Shrimati Sualeha Rasheed
- Children: 2
- As of 21 September, 2006

Rasheed Masood (15 August 1947 – 5 October 2020) was an Indian politician who was a 9 time MP, 5 time Lok Sabha and 4 time Rajya Sabha member and was an Indian politician, a member of the Indian National Congress party and a member of the Lok Sabha representing Saharanpur constituency in Uttar Pradesh. He was known to be a one of successful politicians of Uttar Pradesh. He was a state health minister and he was also the United National Progressive Alliance candidate for the vice-president in the 10 August 2007 election and placed third with 75 votes.

== Life ==
He earned B.Sc. and LLM from Aligarh Muslim University. Masood was an agriculturist by profession. He was general secretary of Bharatiya Lok Dal between 1975 and 1977. He was elected to the 6th Lok Sabha for the first time on a Janata Party ticket in the post-emergency polls in 1977. He went on to become the treasurer of the Janata Parliamentary Party between 1979 and 1980.

Masood was re-elected to the 7th Lok Sabha on a Lok Dal ticket in the 1980 polls. After being the chief whip of Lok Dal in 1982, he became the deputy leader of Lok Dal Parliamentary Party for more than a year. He was the member of the Rajya Sabha from 1986 to '89. From 1989 to '91, he was a member of the 9th Lok Sabha. From April to November 1990, he was Minister of Health and Family Welfare (Independent Charge) in the V P Singh government. In 1991 he was re-elected to the 10th Lok Sabha.

In the late eighties, he was associated with Janata Party and was its deputy Parliamentary party leader. In the nineties, he joined the Samajwadi Party. He was the member of the 14th Lok Sabha from 2004 to 2009. In 2010, he was re-elected to the Rajya Sabha.

On 12 December 2011, he resigned from the Rajya Sabha (Upper House) and from the Samajwadi Party and joined INC. He was elected as the special member of CWC (Congress Working Committee). He became the chairman of APEDA on 4 April 2013 for a term of 3 years.

On 5 October 2020, Masood died from complications of COVID-19 during the COVID-19 pandemic in India.

== Elections Contested ==
=== Lok Sabha ===
Year	Constituency	Result	Vote percentage	Opposition Candidate	Opposition Party	Opposition vote percentage	Ref
1977	Saharanpur	Won	67.32%	Zahid Hasan	INC	25.62%	
1980	Saharanpur	Won	37.60%	Qamar Alam	JNP	27.07%	
1984	Saharanpur	Lost	39.22%	Chaudhary Yashpal Singh	INC	53.13%	
1989	Saharanpur	Won	54.55%	Chaudhary Yashpal Singh	INC	34.09%	
1991	Saharanpur	Won	41.62%	Nakli Singh	BJP	38.52%	
1996	Saharanpur	Lost	32.89%	Nakli Singh	BJP	33.24%	
1998	Saharanpur	Lost	18.07%	Nakli Singh	BJP	33.19%	
1999	Saharanpur	Lost	27.64%	Mansoor Ali Khan	BSP	30.53%	
2004	Saharanpur	Won	35.67%	Mansoor Ali Khan	BSP	32.96%	
2009	Saharanpur	Lost	32.87%	Jagdish Singh Rana	BSP	43.21%	

== Rajya Sabha Election History ==
Position	Party	Constituency	From	To	Tenure
Member of Parliament, Rajya Sabha (1st Term)	JP	Uttar Pradesh	5 July 1986	27 Nov. 1989	3 years, 145 days
Member of Parliament, Rajya Sabha (2nd Term)	SP	Uttar Pradesh	5 July 2010	9 March 2012	1 year, 248 days
Member of Parliament, Rajya Sabha (3rd Term)	INC	Uttar Pradesh	3 April 2012	19 Sept 2013	1 year, 169 days

== Corruption allegations and conviction ==
On 19 September 2013, a Special CBI court held Rasheed Masood guilty in a case of corruption and other offences. He was held guilty of fraudulently nominating undeserving candidates to MBBS seats allotted to Tripura in medical colleges across the country from the central pool.

On 1 October 2013, Rasheed was sentenced to four years in jail. As a result of the conviction, he was disqualified from the Parliament of India. He, thus got the dubious distinction of becoming the first elected member of parliament to be disqualified from the Parliament of India, in the entire history of the Republic of India. He was serving as a member of parliament, representing the Congress Party, to the upper house of the Indian parliament when the verdict was pronounced and his membership stripped.

Lok Sabha
Preceded by Sunder Lal	Member of Parliament for Saharanpur; 1977 – 1984	Succeeded by Chaudhary Yashpal Singh
Preceded by Chaudhary Yashpal Singh	Member of Parliament for Saharanpur; 1989 – 1996	Succeeded by Nakli Singh
Preceded by Mansoor Ali Khan	Member of Parliament for Saharanpur; 2004 – 2009	Succeeded by Jagdish Singh Rana
Rajya Sabha
Preceded by N/A	Member of Parliament for Rajya Sabha (Uttar Pradesh); 1986 - 1989	Succeeded by N/A
Preceded by N/A	Member of Parliament for Rajya Sabha (Uttar Pradesh); 2010 - 2012	Succeeded by N/A
Preceded by Mahmood Madani	Member of Parliament for Rajya Sabha (Uttar Pradesh); 2012 - 2013	Succeeded by Pramod Tiwari
