= Mahaveer Singh Rana =

Indian politician

MLA, 16th Legislative Assembly
- In office March 2012 – March 2017
- Preceded by: Dr. Dharam Singh Saini
- Succeeded by: Naresh Saini
- Constituency: Behat

Personal details
- Born: 22 September 1963 Muradnagar (Uttar Pradesh)
- Died: 16 October 2023 (aged 60) Max healthcare Dehradun
- Citizenship: India
- Party: Bharatiya Janata Party
- Other political affiliations: Bahujan Samaj Party
- Spouse: Anita Singh Rana
- Children: 1 son & 2 daughters.
- Parent: Mr. Harkesh Singh Rana (father)
- Profession: Agriculturist & Politician

Mahaveer Singh Rana was an Indian politician and was a member of the 16th Legislative Assembly of Uttar Pradesh of India. Rana represented the Behat constituency of Uttar Pradesh and is a member of the BJP political party.

== Early life and education ==
Mahaveer Singh Rana was born in Muradnagar in the state of Uttar Pradesh. He attained LL.B.degree. Rana is an Agriculturist by profession.

== Political career ==
Rana was a one time MLA. He lost his seat in the 2017 Uttar Pradesh Assembly election to Naresh Saini of the Indian National Congress.

He died from brain hemorrhage in 2023.

== Posts Held ==
#	From	To	Position	Comments
01	2012	2017	Member, 16th Legislative Assembly	

== See also ==
- Bhartiya Janta Party
- Politics of India
- Uttar Pradesh Legislative Assembly
