= Baliakheri railway station =

Railway station in Uttar Pradesh

Baliakheri
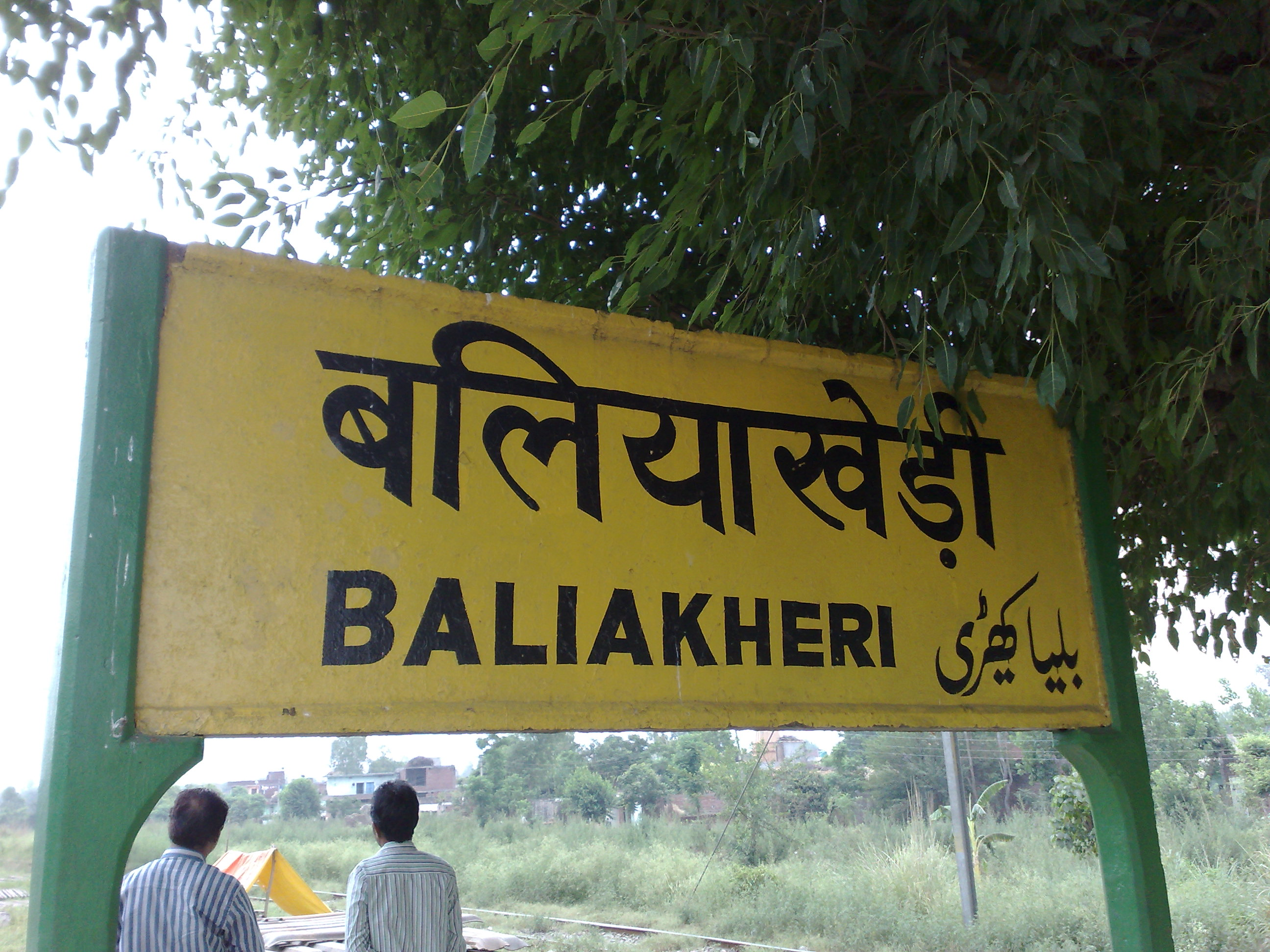

General information
- Location: Baliakheri, Saharanpur district, Uttar Pradesh; India
- Coordinates: 29°55′43″N 77°38′01″E
- Elevation: 276 m (906 ft)
- System: Passenger train station
- Owner: Indian Railways
- Operator: Northern Railway
- Line: Moradabad–Ambala line
- Platforms: 3
- Tracks: 2

Construction
- Structure type: Standard (on ground station)

Other information
- Status: Active
- Station code: BAE
- Zone(s): Northern Railway zone
- Division(s): Moradabad

History
- Opened: 1886
- Former names: Oudh and Rohilkhand Railway

Services
Preceding station	Indian Railways	Following station
Sunehti Kharkhari towards ?	Northern Railway zone Moradabad–Ambala line	Saharanpur Junction towards ?
Location

Baliakheri railway station is a station on the Moradabad–Ambala line under the Moradabad railway division of the Northern Railway zone in India. It is situated at Baliakheri in Saharanpur district of the state of Uttar Pradesh.
