= Haji Fazlur Rehman =

Indian politician

Member of Parliament, Lok Sabha
- In office 23 May 2019 – 4 June 2024
- Preceded by: Raghav Lakhanpal
- Succeeded by: Imran Masood
- Constituency: Saharanpur

Member, Standing Committee on Health and Family Welfare
- In office 13 September 2019 – 4 June 2024
- Constituency: Saharanpur

Personal details
- Born: 30 November 1951 (age 74) Saharanpur, Uttar Pradesh, India
- Party: Samajwadi Party
- Other political affiliations: Bahujan Samaj Party
- Children: 7
- Education: Aligarh Muslim University
- Profession: Businessman

Haji Fazlur Rehman is an Indian politician who was a Member of Lok Sabha for Saharanpur from 2019 till 2024.

== Personal life ==
Rehman graduated from the Aligarh Muslim University in 1972. His family are major beef exporters in Uttar Pradesh.

== Political career ==
On 27 February 2019, Mahagathbandhan, the grand alliance of Samajwadi Party, Bahujan Samaj Party and Rashtriya Lok Dal announced that Rehman would contest the upcoming 2019 Indian general election from Saharanpur constituency on the symbol of Bahujan Samaj Party. On 23 May 2019, Rehman was elected to the Lok Sabha after defeating Raghav Lakhanpal of Bharatiya Janata Party, his nearest rival by a margin of 22,417 votes. Rehman polled 5,14,139 votes.
