= Devender Kumar Nim =

Indian politician

MLA in 18th Legislative Assembly of Uttar Pradesh
- Incumbent
- Assumed office 2022
- Constituency: Rampur Maniharan, Saharanpur

MLA in 17th Legislative Assembly of Uttar Pradesh
- In office 2017–2022
- Preceded by: Ravinder Kumar Molhu

Personal details
- Born: Saharanpur, Uttar Pradesh, India
- Party: Bhartiya Janata Party
- Education: Delhi University
- Occupation: MLA
- Profession: Politician

Devender Kumar Nim is an Indian politician. He belongs to the Bharatiya Janata Party. He is a member of 18th Uttar Pradesh Assembly and was also Seventeenth Legislative Assembly of Uttar Pradesh member representing the Rampur Maniharan constituency. Nim is 47 years old (2017).

== Political career ==
Nim has been a member of the 18th Uttar Pradesh Assembly and also the 17th Legislative Assembly of Uttar Pradesh. He got 89,109 votes in 18th Uttar Pradesh Assembly and defeated BSP candidates by a margin of 20,593 votes. Since 2017, he has represented the Rampur Maniharan and is a member of the Bhartiya Janata Party. In 2017 elections he defeated Bahujan Samaj Party candidate Ravinder Kumar Molhu by a margin of 595 votes.

== Posts held ==
#	From	To	Position	Comments
01	2017	2022	Member, 17th Legislative Assembly	
02	2022	Incumbent	Member, 18th Legislative Assembly	
