= Yashpal Singh (politician) =

Indian politician

Yashpal Singh Gurjar

Member of Parliament, 8th Lok Sabha
- In office Dec 1984 – Nov 1989
- Constituency: Saharanpur

MLA, 02nd Legislative Assembly
- In office Apr 1957 – Mar 1962
- Constituency: Deoband

1962-1984
- Preceded by: Ch.Data Ram
- Succeeded by: Kanwar Pal
- Constituency: Member of The legislative assembly, Nakur

Personal details
- Born: c. 1921 Saharanpur district, (Uttar Pradesh)
- Died: 12 December 2015 (aged 94) Delhi, India
- Citizenship: India
- Party: Samajwadi Party
- Other political affiliations: Indian National Congress; Bharatiya Janata Party; Rashtriya Lok Dal
- Children: 4 (Rudrasain and Inder Sain)
- Parent(s): Chaudhary Dhiraj Singh (Father), Mukhi Devi (Mother)
- Occupation: Politician

Chaudhary Yashpal Singh (c. 1921 – 12 December 2015) was an Indian politician and Member of Parliament of India. He was a member of the 8th Lok Sabha and has also been a member of the Uttar Pradesh Legislative Assembly several times. Singh represented the Saharanpur constituency of Uttar Pradesh. Yashpal Singh was National Vice President of the Samajwadi Party political party. However, he represented the Indian National Congress during the 8th Lok Sabha.

== Early life and education ==
Chaudhary Yashpal Singh was born in a Gurjar family of Saharanpur district of Uttar Pradesh state. His highest attained education is twelfth grade.

== Political career ==
Singh was active in politics since the 1950s. He first became MLA from Nakur in 1962, the same year that another person named Yashpal was elected to Lok Sabha from Kairana. He was initially associated with Indian National Congress and was a member of the Lok Sabha in 1980s, apart from being a Member of Legislative Assembly and Cabinet Minister in State of Uttar Pradesh several times. In early 2000s, Singh joined Bharatiya Janata Party followed by Rashtriya Lok Dal in the first week of January 2012; only to join Samajwadi Party in another two weeks. He was the Vice President of Samajwadi Party.

== Death ==
Singh died aged 94 at Escorts Hospital in Delhi on 12 December 2015.

== Posts held ==
#	From	To	Position	Comments
01	1962	1967	Member, 02nd Legislative Assembly	
02	1969	1974	Member Legislative Council of Uttar Pradesh (MLC) Saharanpur	
03	1974	1977	Member, Legislative Assembly of Uttar Pradesh	
03	1974	1977	Minister, PWD Minister Uttar Pradesh	
04	1977	1980	Member, Legislative Assembly of Uttar Pradesh	
05	1980	1984	Member, Legislative Assembly of Uttar Pradesh	
05	1980	1984	Minister, Revenue Minister, Agriculture Minister, Excise Minister and Prohibition Minister (Madhya nishedha)	
06	1984	1989	Member, 8th Lok Sabha	Represented INC
07	1993	1997	Member, legislative Assembly of Uttar Pradesh	

== See also ==
- Lists of members of the Lok Sabha by year
- Politics of India
