= Lists of members of the Lok Sabha by year =

Lists of members of the Lok Sabha, the lower house of the Parliament of India include:

- 1st Lok Sabha 1952–1957,
  - List of members of the 1st Lok Sabha
- 2nd Lok Sabha 1957–1962,
  - List of members of the 2nd Lok Sabha
- 3rd Lok Sabha 1962–1967,
  - List of members of the 3rd Lok Sabha
- 4th Lok Sabha 1967–1971,
  - List of members of the 4th Lok Sabha
- 5th Lok Sabha 1971–1977,
  - List of members of the 5th Lok Sabha
- 6th Lok Sabha 1977–1980,
  - List of members of the 6th Lok Sabha
- 7th Lok Sabha 1980–1984,
  - List of members of the 7th Lok Sabha
- 8th Lok Sabha 1984–1989,
  - List of members of the 8th Lok Sabha
- 9th Lok Sabha 1989–1991,
  - List of members of the 9th Lok Sabha
- 10th Lok Sabha 1991–1996,
  - List of members of the 10th Lok Sabha
- 11th Lok Sabha 1996–1998,
  - List of members of the 11th Lok Sabha
- 12th Lok Sabha 1998–1999,
  - List of members of the 12th Lok Sabha
- 13th Lok Sabha 1999–2004,
  - List of members of the 13th Lok Sabha
- 14th Lok Sabha 2004–2009,
  - List of members of the 14th Lok Sabha
- 15th Lok Sabha 2009–2014,
  - List of members of the 15th Lok Sabha
- 16th Lok Sabha 2014–2019,
  - List of members of the 16th Lok Sabha
- 17th Lok Sabha 2019–2024,
  - List of members of the 17th Lok Sabha
- 18th Lok Sabha 2024–till date,
  - List of members of the 18th Lok Sabha
