= Nakur Assembly constituency =

Constituency of the Uttar Pradesh legislative assembly in India

Nakur
- Constituency No. 2 for the Uttar Pradesh Legislative Assembly

Constituency details
- Country: India
- Region: North India
- State: Uttar Pradesh
- District: Saharanpur
- Total electors: 329,580 (2017)
- Reservation: None

Member of Legislative Assembly
- 18th Uttar Pradesh Legislative Assembly
- Incumbent Mukesh Choudhary
- Party: Bharatiya Janta Party
- Elected year: 2022

Nakur Assembly constituency is one of the 403 constituencies of the Uttar Pradesh Legislative Assembly, India. It is a part of the Saharanpur district and one of the five assembly constituencies in the Kairana Lok Sabha constituency. First election in this assembly constituency was held in 1952 after the "DPACO (1951)" (delimitation order) was passed in 1951. After the "Delimitation of Parliamentary and Assembly Constituencies Order" was passed in 2008, the constituency was assigned identification number 2.

== Wards and areas ==
Extent of Nakur Assembly constituency is KCs Nakur, Sarsawa, Sultanpur, Sarsawa NPP, Nakur NPP and Chilkana Sultanpur NP of Nakur-Tehsil.

== Members of the Legislative Assembly ==
Year	Name	Party
1952	Data Ram	Indian National Congress
1957	Data Ram	Indian National Congress
1962	Yashpal Singh	Indian National Congress
1967	N.Singh	Independent
1969	Qazi Masood	Independent
1974	Yashpal Singh	Indian National Congress
1977	Yashpal Singh	Indian National Congress
1980	Yashpal Singh	Indian National Congress (I)
1985	Ram Sharan	Lok Dal
1989	Kunwar Pal Singh	Independent
1991	Kunwar Pal Singh	Independent
1993	Yashpal Singh	Indian National Congress
1996	Kunwar Pal Singh	Independent
2000^	Pradeep Choudhary	Rashtriya Lok Dal
2002	Sushil Chaudhary	Indian National Congress
2007	Mahipal Singh	Bahujan Samaj Party
2012	Dharam Singh Saini	Bahujan Samaj Party
2017	Dharam Singh Saini	Bharatiya Janta Party
2022	Mukesh Choudhary	Bharatiya Janta Party

== Election results ==
=== 2027 ===
2027 Uttar Pradesh Legislative Assembly election: Nakur
Party	Candidate	Votes	%	±%
NDA				
INDIA				
BSP	Naresh Saini			
NOTA	None of the above			
Majority				
Turnout				
gain from		Swing		

=== 2022 ===
2022 Uttar Pradesh Legislative Assembly election: Nakur
Party	Candidate	Votes	%	±%
BJP	Mukesh Choudhary	104,114	38.47	+1.54
SP	Dharam Singh Saini	103,799	38.35	
BSP	Sahil Khan	55,112	20.36	−5.21
AIMIM	Rizwana Ali	3,593	1.33	
NOTA	None of the above	710	0.26	−0.22
Majority		315	0.12	−1.46
Turnout		270,652	76.1	−1.43
BJP hold		Swing		

=== 2017 ===
2017 Uttar Pradesh Legislative Assembly election: Nakur
Party	Candidate	Votes	%	±%
BJP	Dharam Singh Saini	94,375	36.93	
INC	Imran Masood	90,318	35.35	
BSP	Naveen Choudhary	65,328	25.57	
NOTA	None of the above	1,232	0.48	
Majority		4,057	1.58	
Turnout		255,532	77.53	
BJP gain from BSP		Swing		

=== 2012 ===
2012 Uttar Pradesh Legislative Assembly election: Nakur
Party	Candidate	Votes	%	±%
BSP	Dharam Singh Saini	89,187	38.65	−2.94
INC	Imran Masood	84,623	36.67	+32.04
SP	Firoz Aftab	29,503	12.79	−16.87
Independent	Govind Chaudhary	14,226	6.17	−
BJP	Mela Ram	6,634	2.87	+0.36
Majority		4,564	1.98	
Turnout		230,751	77.18	+13.81
BSP hold		Swing		

=== 2007 ===
2007 Uttar Pradesh Legislative Assembly election: Nakur
Party	Candidate	Votes	%	±%
BSP	Mahipal Singh	71,246	41.59	−
SP	Pradeep Choudhary	50,808	29.66	−
RLD	Chaudhary Indarsain	29,421	17.17	−
INC	Sushil Chaudhary	7,947	4.63	−
BJP	Ramesh Chand	4,300	2.51	−
Majority		20,438	11.93	−
Turnout		171,298	63.37	−
BSP gain from INC		Swing		

== See also ==
- Kairana Lok Sabha constituency
- Saharanpur district
- Sixteenth Legislative Assembly of Uttar Pradesh
- Uttar Pradesh Legislative Assembly
- Vidhan Bhawan
