= Umar Ali Khan =

Indian politician

Member of the Uttar Pradesh Legislative Assembly
- Incumbent
- Assumed office 10 March 2022
- Preceded by: Naresh Saini
- Constituency: Behat

Member of the Uttar Pradesh Legislative Council
- In office 6 May 2012 – 5 May 2018
- Constituency: elected by Legislative Assembly members

Personal details
- Born: Uttar Pradesh, India
- Party: Samajwadi Party
- Parent: Sarfaraz Ali Khan (father)
- Education: S.R.M. Institute Of Science & Technology, Modi Nagar, Dr. Bhimrao Ambedkar University (MBA); Chaudhary Charan Singh University (BA)

Umar Ali Khan is an Indian politician and a member of Uttar Pradesh Legislative Assembly from Behat representing Samajwadi Party since March 2022. He previously served as a member of Uttar Pradesh Legislative Council.

Khan is a son in law of Syed Ahmed Bukhari.
