= Jagpal =

Indian politician

Mla Jagpal Singh

MLA, 16th Legislative Assembly
- In office Mar 2012 – 11 Mar 2017
- Preceded by: Mahipal Singh
- Succeeded by: Masood Akhtar
- Constituency: Saharanpur

MLA, 15th Legislative Assembly
- In office May 2007 – Mar 2012
- Preceded by: Mayawati
- Constituency: Harora

MLA, 13th Legislative Assembly
- In office Jun 1998 – Mar 2002

Personal details
- Born: 1 January 1960 (age 66) village Gagalhedi (Uttar Pradesh)
- Citizenship: India
- Party: Bharatiya Janata Party (2021-Present)
- Other political affiliations: Bahujan Samaj Party (Till 2021)
- Spouse: Mrs. Bhagwanti
- Children: 3 sons & 3 daughters.
- Parent: Mr. Jai Singh (father)
- Profession: Agriculturist & Politician

Jagpal Singh is an Indian politician and member of the 13th, 15th and the 16th Legislative Assembly of Uttar Pradesh of India. He represents the Saharanpur constituency of Uttar Pradesh and is a member of the BSP political party.

== Early life and education ==
Jagpal Singh was born in district of Saharanpur, Uttar Pradesh. His highest attained educational qualification is Intermediate.

== Political career ==
Jagpal has been a MLA for three terms. In the 16th Legislative Assembly, he represents Saharanpur (Assembly constituency). In 2007, during the 15th Legislative Assembly, he represented Harora constituency which was earlier contested by Mayawati. He was also a member of the 13th Legislative Assembly of Uttar Pradesh.

== Posts Held ==
#	From	To	Position	Comments
01	1996	2002	Member, 13th Legislative Assembly	
02	2007	2012	Member, 15th Legislative Assembly	
03	2012	-	Member, 16th Legislative Assembly	

== See also ==
- Saharanpur (Assembly constituency)
- Uttar Pradesh Legislative Assembly
- Government of India
- Politics of India
- Bahujan Samaj Party
