= Saharanpur Assembly constituency =

Vidhan Sabha constituency in Uttar Pradesh, India

Saharanpur Dehat
- Constituency No. 4 for the Uttar Pradesh Legislative Assembly

Constituency details
- Country: India
- Region: North India
- State: Uttar Pradesh
- District: Saharanpur
- Reservation: None

Member of Legislative Assembly
- 18th Uttar Pradesh Legislative Assembly
- Incumbent Ashu Malik
- Party: Samajwadi Party
- Elected year: 2022

Saharanpur Dehat Assembly constituency is one of the 403 constituencies of the Uttar Pradesh Legislative Assembly, India. It is a part of the Saharanpur district and one of the five assembly constituencies in the Saharanpur Lok Sabha constituency. Saharanpur Dehat Assembly constituency came into existence in 1955 as a result of the "Final Order DC (1953–1955)". The extant and serial number of this constituency was last defined in "Delimitation of Parliamentary and Assembly Constituencies Order, 2008".

== Wards / Areas ==
Saharanpur assembly constituency comprises the following Wards / areas.

#	Name	Reserved for	Comments
01	Dabki Gujjar	None	
02	Dara Ali	None	
03	Dara Shivpuri	None	
04	Harora	None	
05	Manak Mau	None	
06	Megh Chhapper	None	
07	Pathanpur	None	
08	Punwarka	None	

== Members of the Legislative Assembly ==
Year	Name	Party
1957	Manzurul Nabi	Indian National Congress
1962	Brahm Dutt Mayor	Independent
1967	Abdul Khaliq	Indian National Congress
1969	Jagannath Khanna	Bharatiya Jana Sangh
1974	S. Kultar Singh	Indian National Congress
1977	Sumer Chand	Janata Party
1980	Surendra Kapil	Indian National Congress (I)
1985	Surendra Kapil	Indian National Congress
1989	Virender Singh	Janata Dal
1991	Lal Krishan Gandhi	Bharatiya Janata Party
1993	Lal Krishan Gandhi	Bharatiya Janata Party
1996	Sanjay Garg	Samajwadi Party
2002	Sanjay Garg	Janata Party
2007	Raghav Lakhanpal	Bharatiya Janata Party
2012	Jagpal Singh	Bahujan Samaj Party
2017	Masood Akhtar	Indian National Congress
2022	Ashu Malik	Samajwadi Party

== Election results ==
=== 2027 ===
2027 Uttar Pradesh Legislative Assembly election: Saharanpur
Party	Candidate	Votes	%	±%
NDA				
INDIA				
BSP	Firoz Aftab			
NOTA	None of the above			
Majority				
Turnout				
gain from		Swing		

=== 2022 ===
2022 Uttar Pradesh Legislative Assembly election: Saharanpur
Party	Candidate	Votes	%	±%
SP	Ashu Malik	107,007	41.18	
BJP	Jagpal singh	76,262	29.35	▲4.61
BSP	Ajab Singh Chaudhary	62,637	24.1	▼7.64
AIMIM	Margoob Hasan	8,187	3.15	
NOTA	None of the above	923	0.36	▼0.05
Majority		30,745	11.83	▲6.64
Turnout		259,855	72.27	▼2.54
SP gain from INC		Swing		

=== 2017 ===
2017 Assembly Elections: Saharanpur
Party	Candidate	Votes	%	±%
INC	Masood Akhtar	87,689	36.93	
BSP	Jagpal Singh	75,365	31.74	
BJP	Manoj Choudhary	58,752	24.74	
Independent	Saad Ali Khan	10,950	4.61	
NOTA	None of the above	968	0.41	
Majority		12,324	5.19	
Turnout		237,468	74.81	
INC gain from BSP		Swing		

=== 2012 ===
2012 Assembly Elections: Saharanpur
Party	Candidate	Votes	%	±%
BSP	Jagpal Singh	80,670	39.57	▲29.44
INC	Abdul Wahid	63,557	31.17	▲28.52
SP	Sarfaraz Khan	43,018	21.10	▼15.20
BJP	Vikram Singh	10,739	5.27	▼42.44
	Remaining 11 candidates	5,898	2.89	▲0.26
Majority		17,113	8.39	
Turnout		203,882	73.79	▲29.19
BSP gain from BJP		Swing		

=== 2007 ===
2007 Assembly Elections: Saharanpur
Party	Candidate	Votes	%	±%
BJP	Raghav Lakhanpal	76,049	47.71	
SP	Sanjay Garg	57,858	36.30	
BSP	Mazahir Hassan	16,147	10.13	
INC	Uma Bhushan	4,226	2.65	
	Remaining 15 candidates	4,201	2.63	
Majority		18,191	11.41	
Turnout		159,376	44.60	
BJP gain from JP		Swing		

== See also ==
- Saharanpur district
- Saharanpur Lok Sabha constituency
- Government of Uttar Pradesh
- List of Vidhan Sabha constituencies of Uttar Pradesh
- Uttar Pradesh
- Uttar Pradesh Legislative Assembly
