= Saharanpur Lok Sabha constituency =

Saharanpur Lok Sabha (01) Constituency in Uttar Pradesh, India

Coordinates: 29.97°N 77.55°E

Saharanpur Lok Sabha-01
- Lok Sabha constituency
- Interactive Map Outlining Saharanpur Lok Sabha constituency

Constituency details
- Country: India
- Region: North India
- State: Uttar Pradesh
- Assembly constituencies: Behat; Saharanpur Nagar; Saharanpur Dehat; Deoband; Rampur Maniharan
- Established: 1952-present
- Total electors: 18,55,510
- Reservation: None

Member of Parliament
- 18th Lok Sabha
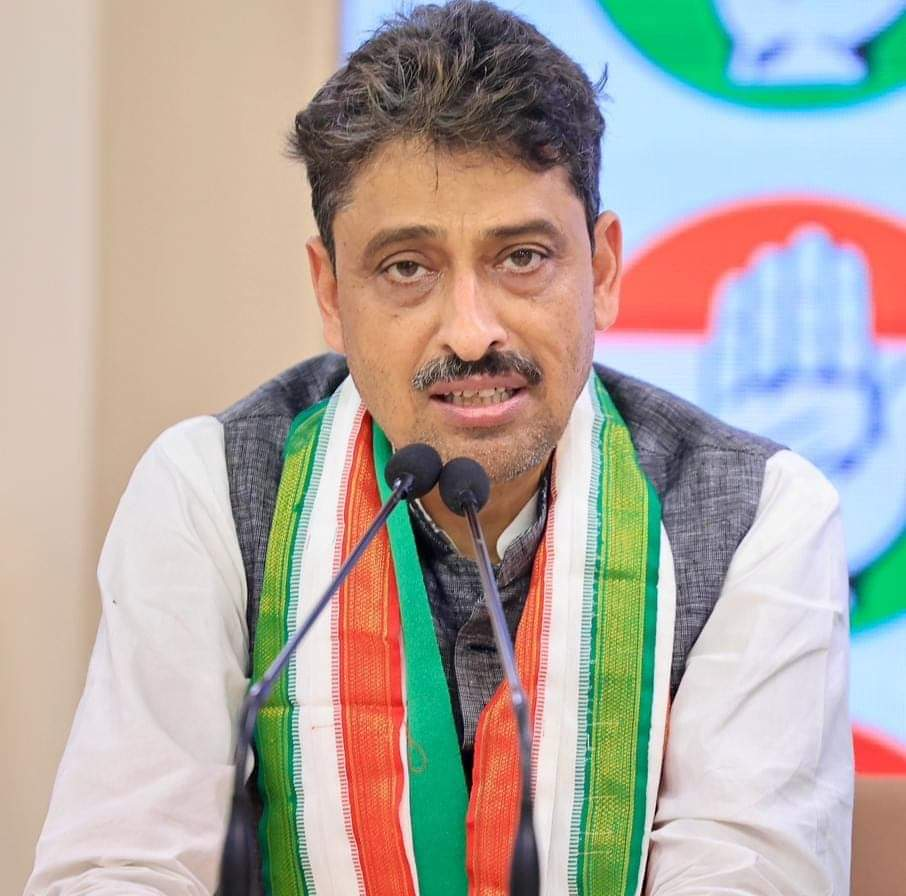
- Incumbent Imran Masood
- Party: INC
- Alliance: INDIA
- Elected year: 2024

Saharanpur Lok Sabha constituency (Hindi pronunciation: [səɦaːɾən̪.pʊɾ]) is one of the 80 Lok Sabha (Lower house of the Parliament) constituencies in the state of Uttar Pradesh, India.

== Assembly segments ==
Saharanpur Lok Sabha constituency comprises the following Legislative Assembly segments.

No	Name	District	Member	Party	2024 Lead
1	Behat	Saharanpur	Umar Ali Khan	SP	INC
3	Saharanpur Nagar	Saharanpur	Rajiv Gumber	BJP	INC
4	Saharanpur Dehat	Saharanpur	Ashu Malik	SP	INC
5	Deoband	Saharanpur	Brijesh Singh	BJP	BJP
6	Rampur Maniharan (SC)	Saharanpur	Devendra Kumar Nim	BJP	BJP

== Members of Parliament ==
Indian National Congress is the most successful political party in Saharanpur Lok Sabha elections.
1. INC (7 terms) (38.9%)
2. BSP (3 terms) (16.7%)
3. BJP (3 terms) (16.7%)
4. JD (2 terms) (11.1%)
5. JP (1 term) (5.56%)
6. JP(S) (1 term) (5.56%)
7. SP (1 term) (5.56%)

Year	Member	Party
1952	Ajit Prasad Jain	Indian National Congress
1952	Sunder Lal	Indian National Congress
1957	Ajit Prasad Jain	Indian National Congress
1957	Sunder Lal	Indian National Congress
1962	Sunder Lal	Indian National Congress
1967	Sunder Lal	Indian National Congress
1971	Sunder Lal	Indian National Congress
1977	Rasheed Masood	Janata Party
1980	Rasheed Masood	Janata Party (Secular)
1984	Yashpal Singh	Indian National Congress
1989	Rasheed Masood	Janata Dal
1991	Rasheed Masood	Janata Dal
1996	Nakli Singh	Bharatiya Janata Party
1998	Nakli Singh	Bharatiya Janata Party
1999	Mansoor Ali Khan	Bahujan Samaj Party
2004	Rasheed Masood	Samajwadi Party
2009	Jagdish Singh Rana	Bahujan Samaj Party
2014	Raghav Lakhanpal	Bharatiya Janata Party
2019	Haji Fazlur Rehman	Bahujan Samaj Party
2024	Imran Masood	Indian National Congress

== Election results ==
=== General election 2024 ===
2024 Indian general elections: Saharanpur
Party	Candidate	Votes	%	±%
INC	Imran Masood	547,967	44.03	▲27.76
BJP	Raghav Lakhanpal	4,83,425	39.33	▼0.59
BSP	Majid Ali	1,80,353	14.67	▼27.07
NOTA	None of the Above	4,566	0.37	▲0.02
Majority		64,542	5.24	▲3.41
Turnout		12,29,455	66.26	▼4.61
INC gain from BSP		Swing		

=== General election 2019 ===
2019 Indian general elections: Saharanpur
Party	Candidate	Votes	%	±%
BSP	Haji Fazlur Rehman	514,139	41.72	▲22.05
BJP	Raghav Lakhanpal	491,722	39.90	▲0.31
INC	Imran Masood	207,068	16.80	▼17.34
NOTA	None of the Above	4,284	0.35	
Majority		22,417	1.82	
Turnout		12,23,348	70.83	▼3.41
BSP gain from BJP		Swing		

=== General election 2014 ===
2014 Indian general elections: Saharanpur
Party	Candidate	Votes	%	±%
BJP	Raghav Lakhanpal	472,999	39.59	▲
INC	Imran Masood	4,07,909	34.14	
BSP	Jagdish Singh Rana	2,35,033	19.67	
SP	Shazaan Masood	52,765	4.42	
Independent	Hansraj Saini	4,068	0.34	
Independent	Sheshraj	4,057	0.33	
AAP	Yogesh Kumar Dahiya	3,065	0.26	
BMP	Prof. Ratan Singh	1,366	0.11	
NOTA	None of the Above	11,084	1.16	
Majority		65,090	5.51	
Turnout		11,94,649	74.26	
BJP gain from BSP		Swing		

=== General election 1998 ===
General Election, 1998: Saharanpur
Party	Candidate	Votes	%	±%
BJP	Nakli Singh	275,103	32.83	
BSP	Kanshi Ram	2,15,267	25.69	
INC	Rasheed Masood	1,49,751	17.87	
SP	Mohammad Irshad	1,43,243	17.09	
NLP	Dr. Masood Ahmad	18,574	2.21	
Majority		59,836	7.14	
Turnout		8,37,748	67.68	
BJP hold		Swing		

== See also ==
- Saharanpur district
- List of constituencies of the Lok Sabha

== Notes ==
- Number (#) in the Assembly Segments table is the "Assembly Segment" number, not a serial number.
- During 1st & 2nd Lok Sabhas, Saharanpur Lok Sabha constituency was not in existence and was a combination of different constituencies.
