= Nakli Singh =

Indian politician

Chaudhary Nakli Singh

Member of Parliament, Lok Sabha
- In office 1996–1999
- Preceded by: Rasheed Masood
- Succeeded by: Mansoor Ali Khan
- Constituency: Saharanpur

Personal details
- Born: 1 January 1943 (age 83) Jandhera Samaspur, Saharanpur, (Uttar Pradesh).
- Party: Bharatiya Janata Party
- Spouse: Shimla (m. 1959)
- Children: 3 sons, 2 daughters
- Parent: Choudhary Sardar Singh (father)
- Education: B.Sc (Agriculture); M.A. (Economics)
- Alma mater: Gochar College in Rampur Maniharan; J.V. Jain Degree College Saharanpur
- Profession: Agriculturist; Social worker Politician

Chaudhary Nakli Singh is an Indian politician and was Member of Parliament in the 11th and 12th Lok Sabhas of India. Singh represented the Saharanpur constituency of Uttar Pradesh and is a member of the Bharatiya Janata Party political party.

== Early life and education ==
Nakli Singh, who belonged to the Panwar clan of Gujjar community, was born in the village Jandhera Samaspur which is in Saharanpur district, UP. He attained B.Sc. (Agriculture) degree and subsequently completed his M.A. (Economics). He is also the founder of Sardar Vallabhbhai Patel Inter College. in his village. His cousin brother Chaudhary Panthi Singh was also a social worker and vice president at Gochar Degree College Rampur Maniharan.

== Political life ==
Apart from being a Member of Parliament, Singh was a member of several committees and has also held several party positions in the BJP. He was the President of BJP of Saharanpur district; Member, National Council of BJP and Vice President of Kisan Morcha, BJP, UP.

== Posts held ==
#	From	To	Position
01	1996	1997	Member 11th Lok Sabha
02	1996	1997	Member, Committee on Food, Civil Supplies and Public Distribution
03	1996	1997	Member, Consultative Committee, Ministry of Food Processing Industries
04	1998	1999	Member 12th Lok Sabha
05	1998	1999	Member, Committee on Communications and its Sub Committee
06	1998	1999	Member, Joint Committee on the functioning of Wakf Boards
07	1998	1999	Member, Consultative Committee, Ministry of Home Affairs

== See also ==
- 11th Lok Sabha
- 12th Lok Sabha
- Politics of India
- Parliament of India
- Government of India
- Saharanpur (Lok Sabha constituency)
- Bharatiya Janata Party
