= Baliakheri =

- Village
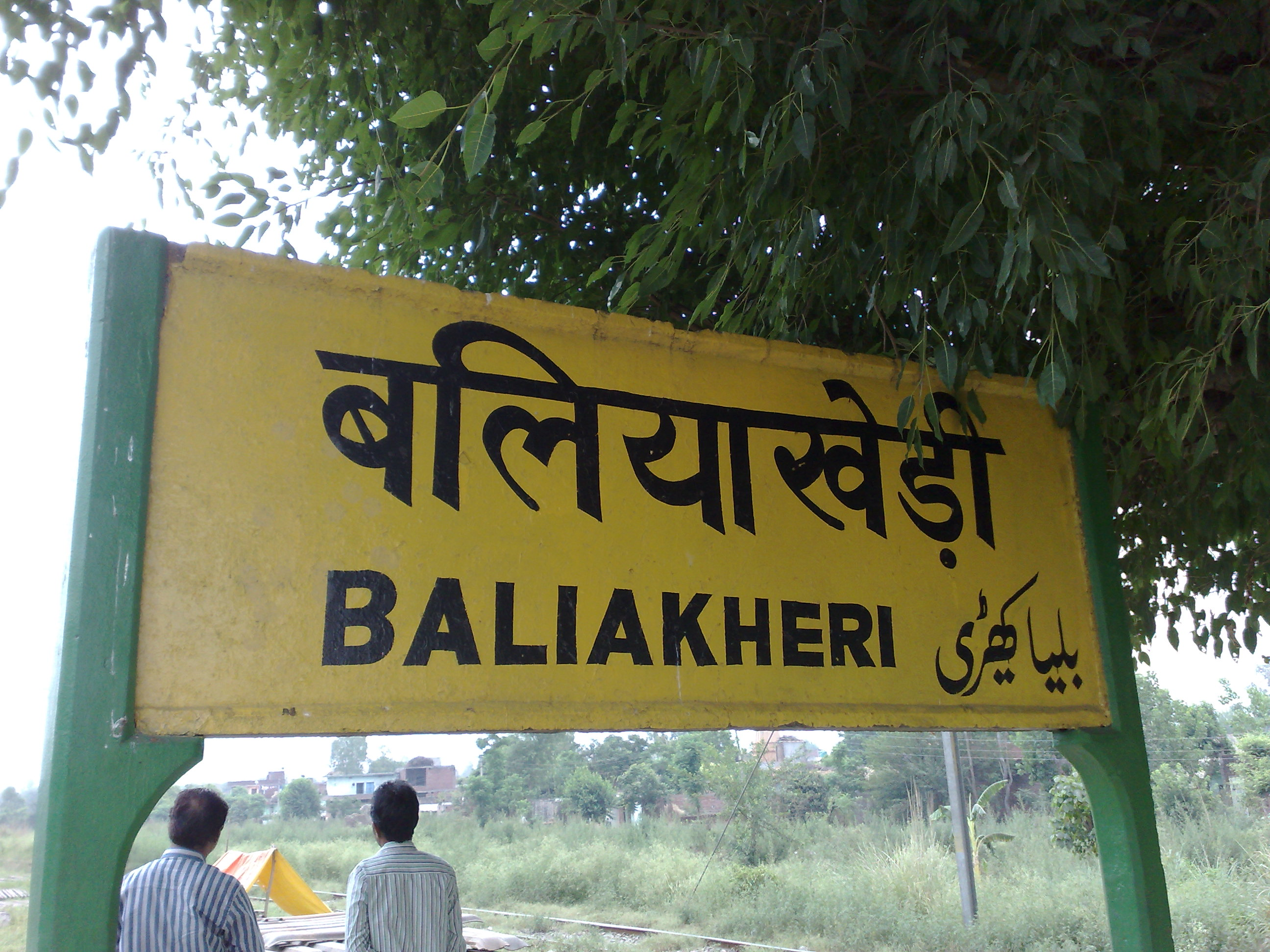

- Village location on map Baliakheri (India)
- Coordinates: 29.925705°N 77.637504°E
- Country: India
- State: Uttar Pradesh
- Elevation: 274 m (899 ft)

Languages
  - Official: Hindi
- Time zone: UTC+5:30 (IST)
- PIN: 247001
- Vehicle registration: UP
- Website: up.gov.in

Baliakheri is a village in Saharanpur district in the Indian state of Uttar Pradesh. It is about 509 kilometers from the state capital Lucknow and 173 kilometers from the national capital Delhi. It is just 11 km from Saharanpur city by road and by train. Many castes live together in the village. Agriculture is main occupation of the villagers. There is a Shiva temple in the village. The Shiva temple is about 200 years old.

== Transportation ==
Baliakheri railway station can be accessed by road and by Indian Railways. Closest airports are Dehradun airport (88 kilometers), Chandigarh Airport (141 kilometers) and Delhi airport (198 kilometers). In this village a railway station is situated where local trains stoppage. The distance of the village from saharanpur district is 9 km far. Mostly people are farmers and the sugarcane is a most famous crop here.

== See also ==
- Saharanpur district
