= Sunehti Kharkhari railway station =

Railway station in Uttar Pradesh

Mohamadpur

General information
- Location: Sunehti Kharkhari, Saharanpur district, Uttar Pradesh; India
- Coordinates: 29°54′47″N 77°41′01″E
- Elevation: 275 m (902 ft)
- System: Passenger train station
- Owner: Indian Railways
- Operator: Northern Railway
- Line: Moradabad–Ambala line
- Platforms: 2
- Tracks: 2

Construction
- Structure type: Standard (on ground station)

Other information
- Status: Active
- Station code: SNKE
- Zone(s): Northern Railway zone
- Division(s): Moradabad

History
- Opened: 1886
- Former names: Oudh and Rohilkhand Railway

Services
Preceding station	Indian Railways	Following station
Chodiala towards ?	Northern Railway zone Moradabad–Ambala line	Baliakheri towards ?
Location

Sunehti Kharkhari railway station is a railway station on Moradabad–Ambala line under the Moradabad railway division of Northern Railway zone. This is situated at Sunehti Kharkhari in Saharanpur district of the Indian state of Uttar Pradesh.
