= Behat Assembly constituency =

Constituency of the Uttar Pradesh legislative assembly in India

Behat
- Constituency No. 1 for the Uttar Pradesh Legislative Assembly

Constituency details
- Country: India
- Region: North India
- State: Uttar Pradesh
- District: Saharanpur
- Lok Sabha constituency: Saharanpur
- Reservation: None

Member of Legislative Assembly
- 18th Uttar Pradesh Legislative Assembly
- Incumbent Umar Ali Khan
- Party: Samajwadi Party
- Elected year: 2022
- Preceded by: Naresh Saini

Behat Assembly constituency is one of the 403 constituencies of the Uttar Pradesh Legislative Assembly, India. It is a part of the Saharanpur district and one of five assembly constituencies in the Saharanpur Lok Sabha constituency.

Behat Assembly constituency came into existence in 2008 as a result of the "Delimitation of Parliamentary and Assembly Constituencies Order, 2008". Prior to 2008, this constituency was served / represented by the Muzaffarabad Assembly constituency.

== Members of the Legislative Assembly ==
Year	Name	Party
Till 2012 : Constituency did not exist
2012	Mahaveer Singh Rana	Bahujan Samaj Party
2017	Naresh Saini	Indian National Congress
2022	Umar Ali Khan	Samajwadi Party

== Election results ==
=== 2027 ===
2027 Uttar Pradesh Legislative Assembly election: Behat
Party	Candidate	Votes	%	±%
NDA				
SP	Umar Ali Khan			
BSP	Rohit Singh Rana			
NOTA	None of the above			
Majority				
Turnout				
gain from		Swing		

=== 2022 ===
2022 Uttar Pradesh Legislative Assembly election: Behat
Party	Candidate	Votes	%	±%
SP	Umar Ali Khan	134,513	47.81	
BJP	Naresh Saini	96,633	34.34	▲6.05
BSP	Raees Malik	45,075	16.02	▼12.1
NOTA	None of the above	1,117	0.4	▼0.23
Majority		37,880	13.47	▲3.34
Turnout		281,373	75.58	▲0.54
SP gain from INC		Swing	▲47.81	

=== 2017 ===
2017 General Elections: Behat
Party	Candidate	Votes	%	±%
INC	Naresh Saini	97,035	38.42	
BJP	Mahaveer Singh Rana	71,449	28.29	
BSP	Mohd Iqbal	71,019	28.12	
Independent	Aditya Pratap Singh	4,187	1.66	
NOTA	None of the above	1,576	0.63	
Majority		25,586	10.13	
Turnout		252,559	75.04	
INC gain from BSP		Swing	▲6.9	

=== 2012 ===
2012 General Elections: Behat
Party	Candidate	Votes	%	±%
BSP	Mahaveer Singh Rana	70,274	31.8	
INC	Naresh Saini	69,760	31.5	
SP	Umar Ali Khan	47,366	21.4	
	Remainder ten candidates	33,722	15.3	
Majority		514	0.2	
Turnout		221,122	72.9	New
BSP win (new seat)				

== See also ==
- Government of Uttar Pradesh
- List of Vidhan Sabha constituencies of Uttar Pradesh
- Uttar Pradesh Legislative Assembly

== Notes ==
- Behat Assembly constituency came into existence in 2008. Prior to 2008, this constituency was served / represented by Muzaffarabad Assembly constituency which now ceases to exist.
