= Ashu Malik =

Indian politician

Ashu Malik MLA
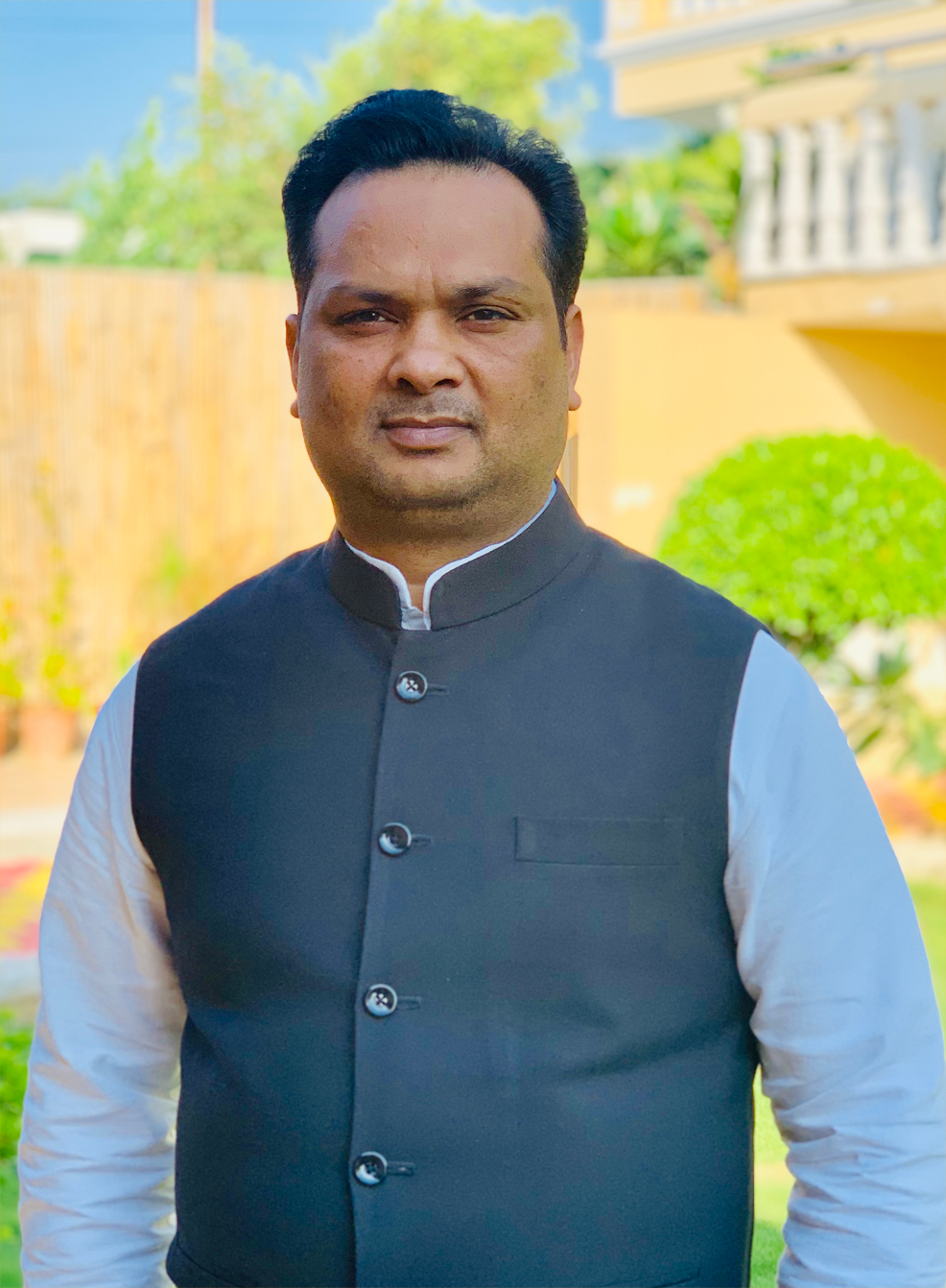

Member of the Uttar Pradesh legislative assembly
- Incumbent
- Assumed office 10 March 2022
- Constituency: Saharanpur

Member of the Uttar Pradesh legislative council
- In office 31 January 2015 – 30 January 2021

Personal details
- Born: 6 April 1983 (age 43)
- Party: Samajwadi Party
- Occupation: Politician
- Website: www.ashumalik.in

Ashu Malik (born 6 April 1983) is an Indian politician belonging to the Samajwadi Party. He is a member of the 18th Uttar Pradesh Assembly, represents the Saharanpur constituency of Uttar Pradesh and also has earlier been a member of the Uttar Pradesh Legislative Council.

== See also ==
- Uttar Pradesh Legislative Assembly
- 18th Uttar Pradesh Assembly
- Samajwadi Party
