= Dharam Singh Saini =

Indian politician

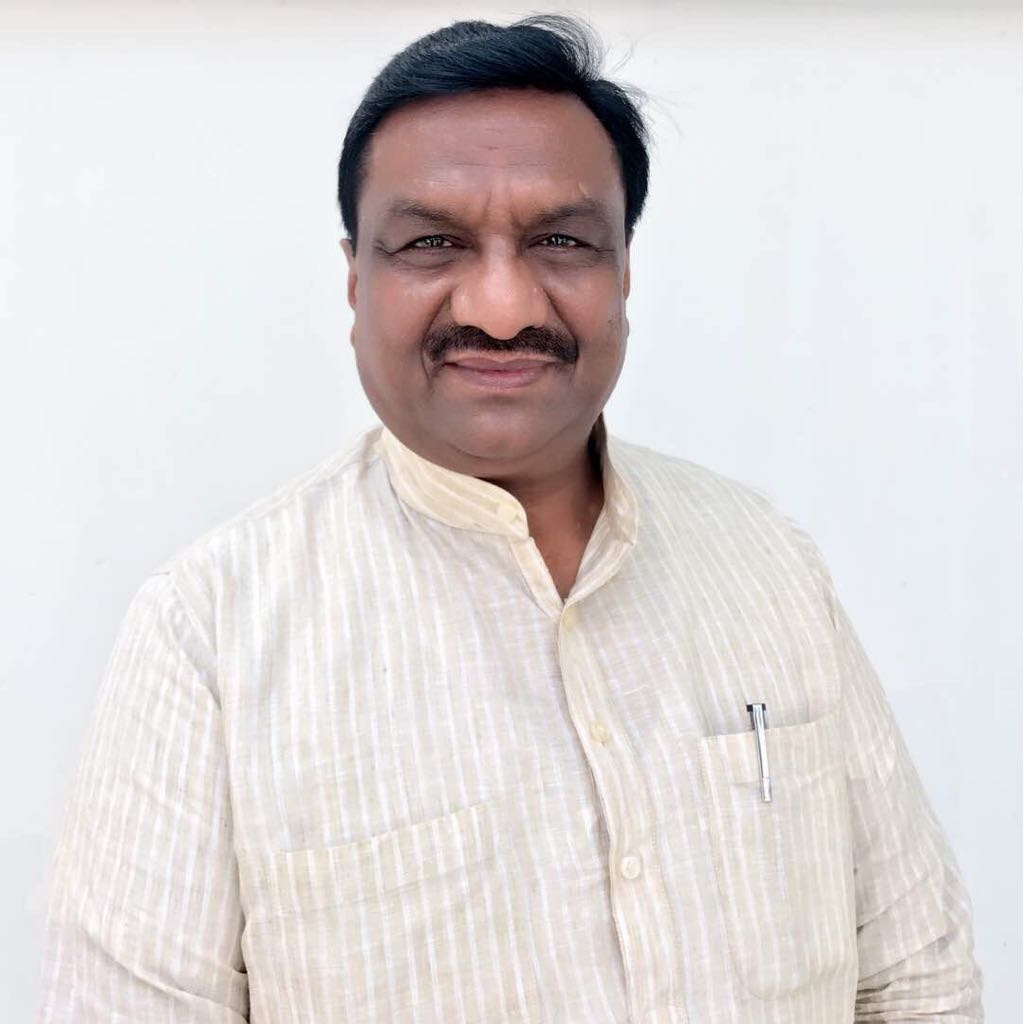

Minister of State (I/C) Ayush, Food Security and Drug Administration Government of Uttar Pradesh
- In office March 2017 – January 2022

Member of the Uttar Pradesh Legislative Assembly
- In office Mar 2012 – 2022
- Preceded by: Mahipal Singh
- Constituency: Nakur
- In office Feb 2002 – May 2012
- Preceded by: Nirbhaya Pal Sharma
- Constituency: Sarsawa

Personal details
- Born: 4 April 1961 (age 65) Sona, Saharanpur, Uttar Pradesh, India
- Party: Bharatiya Janta Party Bahujan Samaj Party (2002-2016)
- Spouse: Sadhana Saini
- Children: 3 sons & 1 daughter.
- Parent: Lal Singh Saini (father)
- Education: Gurukul Ayurved Mahavidyalaya, Jwalapur, Haridwar (now Uttarakhand Ayurved University - Gurukul Campus, Haridwar)
- Profession: Physician & Politician

Dharam Singh Saini is an Indian politician and is a member of the 14th, 15th, 16th and the Seventeenth Legislative Assembly of Uttar Pradesh of India. Saini represents the Nakur constituency of Uttar Pradesh and is a member of the Bharatiya Janta Party political party.

== Early life and education ==
Dharam Singh Saini was born in village Sona in the state of Uttar Pradesh. He attained Gurukul Ayurved Mahavidyalaya, Jwalapur, Haridwar (now Uttarakhand Ayurved University - Gurukul Campus, Haridwar) and earned B.A.M.S degree and is a practicing Ayurveda physician.

== Political career ==
Saini has been a MLA for four straight terms. During the 14th and 15th Legislative Assembly of Uttar Pradesh he represented the Sarsawa assembly constituency of Uttar Pradesh. During the 15th Legislative Assembly, he was also a minister. He got the ministries of Ayush, Relief and Rehabilitation. Saini has been a proponent of premiership of Keshav Prasad Maurya for the state of Uttar Pradesh. In 2023, in a socio-cultural program organised by Saini people called "Bhagirath Jayanti", he declared that Maurya should be Chief Minister of state of Uttar Pradesh.

== Posts held ==
#	From	To	Position	Comments
01	2002	2007	Member, 14th Legislative Assembly	
02	2002	2007	Minister, Basic Education, Uttar Pradesh	
03	2007	2012	Member, 15th Legislative Assembly	
04	2012	2017	Member 16th Legislative Assembly	
05	2017	2022	Member, 17th Legislative Assembly	
06	2017	2022	Minister of State (Independent Charge). Ayush, Food Security and Drug Administration (MOS), Government of Uttar Pradesh	

== See also ==
- Politics of India
- Uttar Pradesh Legislative Assembly
