= Ghazipur Lok Sabha constituency =

Lok Sabha constituency in Uttar Pradesh

Coordinates: 25.58°N 83.58°E

Ghazipur UP-61
- Lok Sabha constituency
- Interactive Map Outlining Ghazipur Lok Sabha constituency

Constituency details
- Country: India
- Region: North India
- State: Uttar Pradesh
- Assembly constituencies: Jakhanian; Saidpur; Ghazipur Sadar; Jangipur; Zamania
- Established: 1952–present
- Reservation: None

Member of Parliament
- 18th Lok Sabha
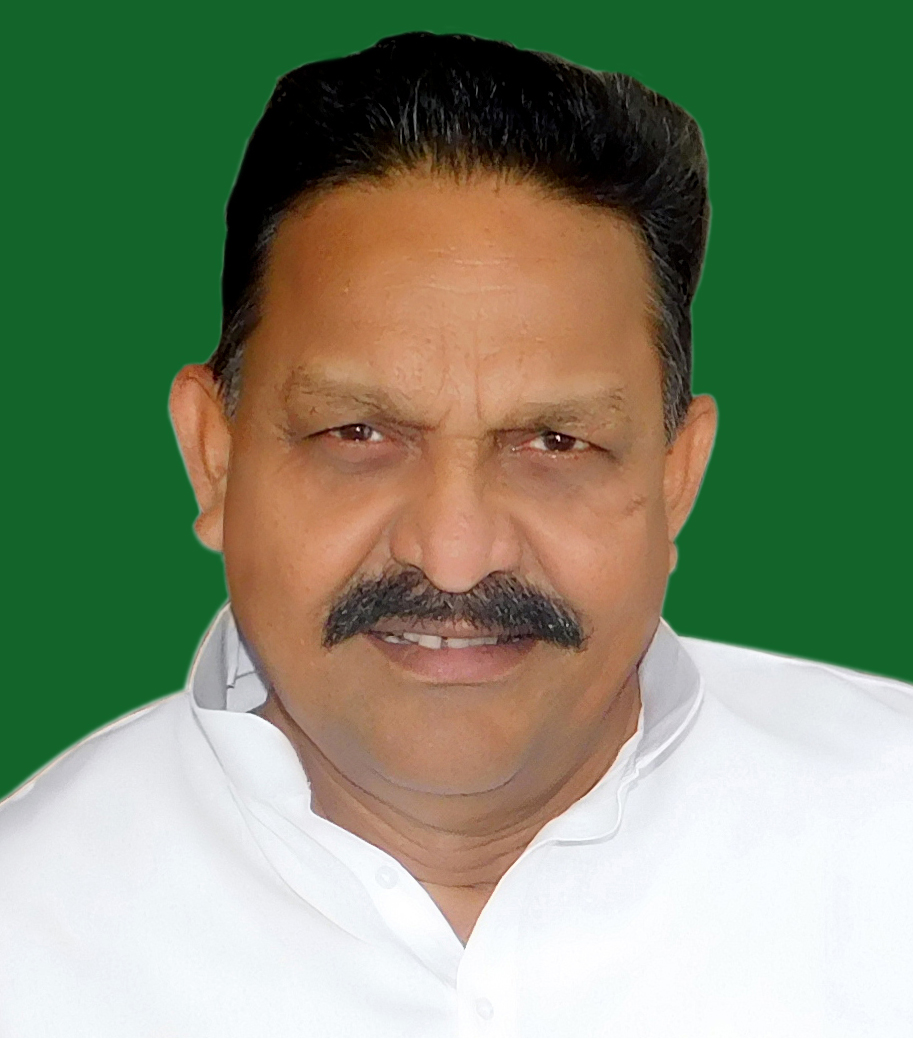
- Incumbent Afzal Ansari
- Party: Samajwadi Party
- Elected year: 2024

Ghazipur Lok Sabha constituency (sometimes spelt 'Gazipur') is one of the 80 Lok Sabha (parliamentary) constituencies in Uttar Pradesh state in northern India. This constituency covers part of Ghazipur district.

== Vidhan Sabha Segments ==
Presently, Ghazipur Lok Sabha constituency comprises five Vidhan Sabha (legislative assembly) segments. These are:

No	Name	District	Member	Party	2024 Lead
373	Jakhanian (SC)	Ghazipur	Triveni Ram	SBSP	SP
374	Saidpur (SC)	Ghazipur	Ankit Bharti	SP	SP
375	Ghazipur Sadar	Ghazipur	Jai Kishan Sahu	SP	SP
376	Jangipur	Ghazipur	Virendra Yadav	SP	SP
379	Zamania	Ghazipur	Omprakash Singh	SP	SP

== Members of Lok Sabha ==
Year	Member	Party
1952	Har Prasad Singh	Indian National Congress
1957	Har Prasad Singh	Indian National Congress
1962	V. S. Gahmari	Indian National Congress
1967	Sarjoo Pandey	Communist Party of India
1971	Sarjoo Pandey	Communist Party of India
1977	Gauri Shankar Rai	Janata Party
1980	Zainul Basher	Indian National Congress (I)
1984	Zainul Basher	Indian National Congress
1989	Jagdish Kushwaha	Independent
1991	Vishwanath Shastri	Communist Party of India
1996	Manoj Sinha	Bharatiya Janata Party
1998	Omprakash Singh	Samajwadi Party
1999	Manoj Sinha	Bharatiya Janata Party
2004	Afzal Ansari	Samajwadi Party
2009	Radhe Mohan Singh	Samajwadi Party
2014	Manoj Sinha	Bharatiya Janata Party
2019	Afzal Ansari	Bahujan Samaj Party
2024	Afzal Ansari	Samajwadi Party

== Election results ==
=== General election, 2024 ===
2024 Indian general elections: Ghazipur
Party	Candidate	Votes	%	±%
SP	Afzal Ansari	539,912	46.82	▲13.00
BJP	Paras Nath Rai	415,051	35.99	▼4.41
BSP	Umesh Singh	164,964	14.31	▼36.89
NOTA	None of the Above	9,065	0.79	▲0.17
Majority		124,861	10.83	▲0.03
Turnout		1,153,094	55.57	▼03.31
SP gain from BSP		Swing		

Detailed results at: https://results.eci.gov.in/PcResultGenJune2024/ConstituencywiseS2475.htm

=== General election, 2019 ===
2019 Indian general elections: Ghazipur
Party	Candidate	Votes	%	±%
BSP	Afzal Ansari	567,082	51.20	+26.71
BJP	Manoj Sinha	4,46,690	40.40	+9.29
SBSP	Ramji	33,877	3.06	
INC	Ajit Pratap Kushawaha	19,834	1.79	
CPI	Dr. Bhanu Prakash Pandey	7,844	0.71	
NOTA	None of the Above	6,871	0.62	
Majority		1,20,392	10.80	
Turnout		11,07,497	58.88	
BSP gain from BJP		Swing	17.42	

=== General election, 2014 ===
2014 Indian general elections: Ghazipur
Party	Candidate	Votes	%	±%
BJP	Manoj Sinha	306,929	31.11	+28.30
SP	Shivkanya Kushwaha	274,477	27.82	−21.40
BSP	Kailash Nath Singh Yadav	241,645	24.49	−15.74
RPD	D. P. Yadav	59,510	6.03	+6.03
Independent	Arun Kumar Singh	34,093	3.46	+3.46
INC	Mohammad Maksud Khan	18,908	1.92	+1.92
NOTA	None of the Above	5,611	0.57	+0.57
Majority		32,452	3.29	−5.70
Turnout		9,86,715	54.77	+4.34
BJP gain from SP		Swing	-18.11	

=== General election, 1971 ===
- Sarjoo Pandey (CPI) : 135,703 votes
- Shri Narain Singh (NCO) : 70210
- Ram Surat Rai (SOC) : 34688
- Satya Narain (BKD) : 24293

=== General election, 1962 ===
- V. S. Gahmari (INC) : 77,046 votes
- Har Prasad (CPI) : 40,183

== See also ==
- Ghazipur district
- List of constituencies of the Lok Sabha
