= Omprakash Singh =

Indian politician

Member of Uttar Pradesh Legislative Assembly
- Incumbent
- Assumed office 2022
- Preceded by: Sunita Singh
- Constituency: Zamania
- In office 2012–2017
- Preceded by: Raj Kumar Singh Gautam
- Succeeded by: Sunita Singh
- Constituency: Zamania
- In office 2002–2007
- Preceded by: Singhasan Singh
- Succeeded by: Pashupati
- Constituency: Dildarnagar
- In office 1989–1998
- Preceded by: Awadhesh Rai Shastri
- Succeeded by: Singhasan Singh
- Constituency: Dildarnagar

Cabinet Minister Government of Uttar Pradesh
- In office 2012–2017
- Governor: Banwari Lal Joshi; Ram Naik
- Chief Minister: Akhilesh Yadav
- Ministry & Department's: Irrigation; Tourism
- In office 2003–2007
- Governor: Vishnu Kant Shastri; T. V. Rajeswar
- Chief Minister: Mulayam Singh Yadav
- Ministry & Department's: Irrigation

Member of Parliament, Lok Sabha
- In office 1998–1999
- Preceded by: Manoj Sinha
- Succeeded by: Manoj Sinha
- Constituency: Ghazipur

Personal details
- Born: 13 May 1959 (age 66) Sevrai, Uttar Pradesh, India
- Party: Samajwadi Party
- Spouse: Smt. Chandrakanti Singh (m.1980)
- Children: 5
- Education: M.A., B.P.Ed. (BHU)
- Occupation: Political and Social Worker

Omprakash Singh (born 13 May 1959) is an Indian politician. He has been elected as an MLA representing Zamania in 2022 Uttar Pradesh Legislative Assembly election. He has been elected for the 7th term. He has also represented Ghazipur in the 12th Lok Sabha from 1998 to 1999. He is a member of the Samajwadi Party.

== Political career ==
In his two years as an MP, he was a member of the Committee on Commerce and its Sub-Committee on Textiles.

From 2003 to 2007 he was the Uttar Pradesh Cabinet Minister for Irrigation, and then from 2012 to 2017 he was the Cabinet Minister for Tourism in the Akhilesh Yadav ministry. He was also a member of the Consultative Committee for the Ministry of Coal, the Railway Convention Committee, and the committee to review the rate of dividend payable by the Railway Undertakings to General Revenues.

In 2012, he was elected to the Indian Legislative Assembly, representing Zamania, while remaining a cabinet minister in the Uttar Pradesh Government for the Samajwadi Party.
