= Subhash Pasi =

Indian politician

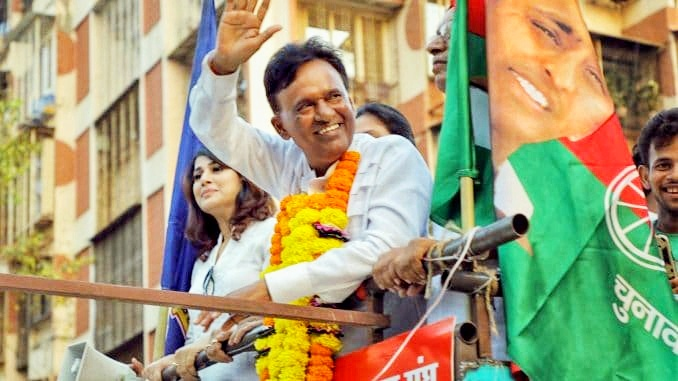

MLA, 17th Legislative Assembly
- In office 2017–2022
- Succeeded by: Ankit Bharti
- Constituency: Saidpur

Personal details
- Party: Bharatiya Janata Party
- Occupation: MLA
- Profession: Politician

Subhash Pasi is an Indian politician who served as a Member of Uttar Pradesh Legislative Assembly. He was elected from Saidpur in Ghazipur district in 2017 Uttar Pradesh assembly election. He fought the election with Samajwadi Party ticket and defeated his close contestant Vidyasagar Sonkar from Bharatiya Janata Party, with a margin of 8,710 votes. Subhash Pasi also won the Uttar Pradesh assembly election held in 2012.

== Early life ==
Subhash Pasi was born in Dihiya Village of Ghazipur district in Uttar Pradesh. He got his early education in his native village. After completing his matriculation he moved to Mumbai. In Mumbai he started taking care of his younger brother's cable business. It was in Mumbai where he started taking part in Congress party's political campaign as an activist.
