= 2012 Uttar Pradesh Legislative Assembly election =

2012 Uttar Pradesh legislative assembly election
- 8 February 2012 – 3 March 2012

All 403 seats of the Uttar Pradesh Legislative Assembly 202 seats needed for a majority
- Turnout: 59.40% (▲13.44%)
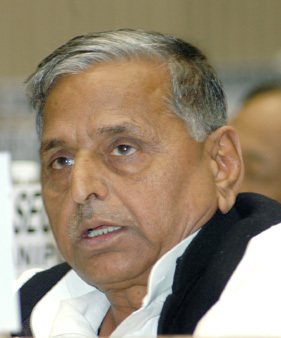

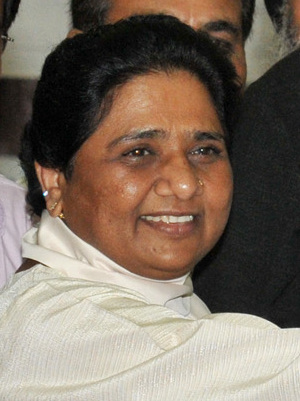

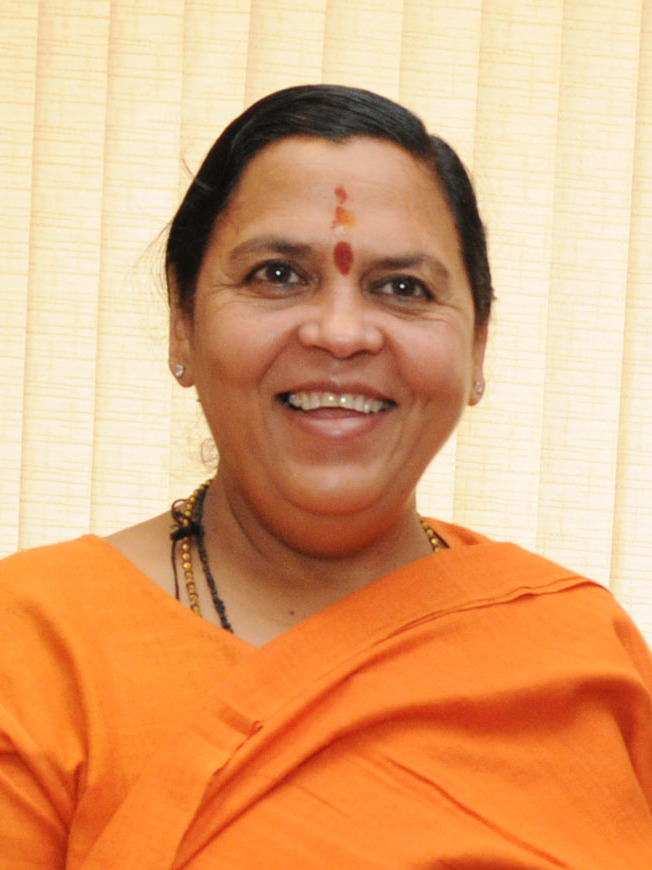

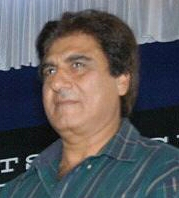

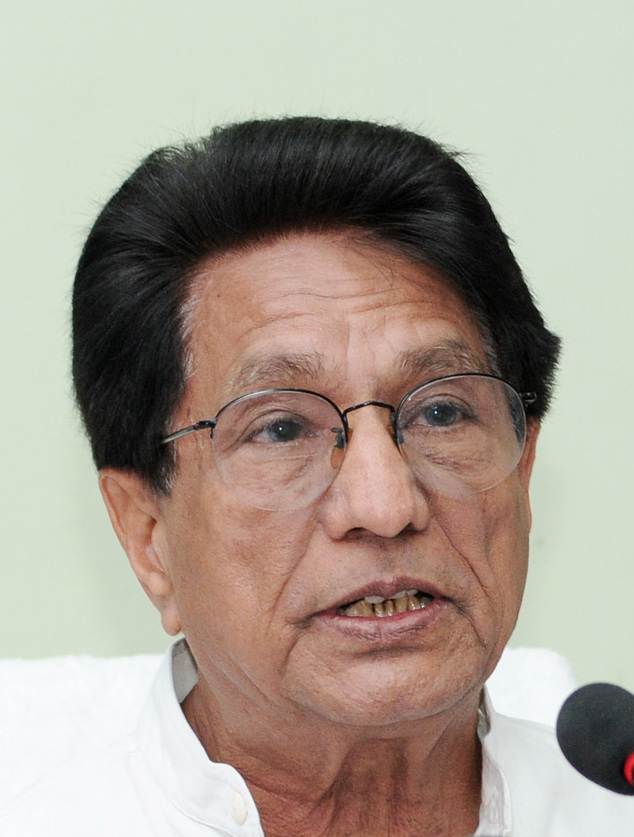
	Majority party	Minority party
Leader	Mulayam Singh Yadav	Mayawati
Party	SP	BSP
Alliance	-	-
Leader since	1992	1995
Leader's seat	didn't stand	MLC
Seats before	97	206
Seats won	224	80
Seat change	▲127	▼126
Popular vote	22,090,571	19,647,303
Percentage	29.15%	25.91%
Swing	▲3.72%	▼4.52%
	Third party	Fourth party
Leader	Uma Bharti	Raj Babbar (Note: Raj Babbar was a Member of Parliament from the Firozabad Lok Sabha constituency from 2009 to 2014. He did not contest the 2012 Uttar Pradesh Legislative Assembly election.)
Party	BJP	INC
Alliance	NDA	UPA
Leader since	2012	2009
Leader's seat	Charkhari	Did not contest
Seats before	51	22
Seats won	47	28
Seat change	▼4	▲6
Popular vote	11,371,080	8,832,895
Percentage	15.00%	11.63%
Swing	▼1.97%	▲3.04%
	Fifth party	Sixth party
Leader	Ajit Singh	Mohamed Ayub
Party	RLD	PECP
Alliance	UPA	-
Leader since	1996	2008
Leader's seat	Did not contest	Khalilabad
Seats before	10	new party
Seats won	9	4
Seat change	▼1	new party
Popular vote	1,763,354	1,785,228
Percentage	2.33%	2.82%
Swing	▼1.37%	new party
- Seatwise Result Map of the election

- Structure of the Uttar Pradesh Legislative Assembly after the election
Chief Minister before election
Mayawati
BSP
Elected Chief Minister
Akhilesh Yadav
SP

The 2012 Uttar Pradesh legislative assembly election followed as a result the expiration of the five-year term of the previous legislature elected in Uttar Pradesh, India. The election to the Uttar Pradesh Legislative Assembly was held in seven phases from 8 February through 3 March 2012. Uttar Pradesh has the world's largest population for a sub-national democracy. The incumbent chief minister Mayawati's Bahujan Samaj Party, which previously won an absolute majority of seats, was defeated by Mulayam Singh Yadav's Samajwadi Party, which gained an absolute majority in the election. Mulayam's son and Samajwadi party state president Akhilesh Yadav was nominated as chief minister by the party.

== Background ==
Uttar Pradesh is the largest state in India in terms of population, but the fourth largest in terms of landmass after the bifurcation to create Uttarakhand. It is also considered politically important because of the number of seats it returns to the Lok Sabha and as including the constituencies of such nationally notable figures as Sonia Gandhi, Rahul Gandhi, Varun Gandhi and Maneka Gandhi of the Nehru-Gandhi family dynasty. It was also previously the home of Prime Ministers Indira Gandhi and Atal Bihari Vajpayee.

The legislative assembly has 403 seats, 206 of which were won by the BSP in the previous election.

== Schedule ==
Initially the ECI announced on 24 December 2011 that the election will occur in seven phases on 4, 8, 11, 15, 19, 23 and 28 February and the results will be declared on 3 March. Later, the date for announcement of result was changed to 6 March.

On 9 January, the Election Commission had announced that the original date of 4 February for the first phase had been changed to 3 March, while vote counting had moved from 4 to 6 March due to celebrations for Barawafat, for which an Election Commission official said that: "There were concerns people would not be able to come out to exercise their franchise."

Poll event	Phase						
Poll event	I	II	III	IV	V	VI	VII
Notification date	12 January 2012	16 January 2012	21 January 2012	25 January 2012	28 January 2012	2 February 2012	6 February 2012
Last date for filing nomination	19 January 2012	23 January 2012	28 January 2012	1 February 2012	4 February 2012	9 February 2012	13 February 2012
Scrutiny of nomination	20 January 2012	24 January 2012	30 January 2012	2 February 2012	6 February 2012	10 February 2012	14 February 2012
Last date for withdrawal of nomination	23 January 2012	27 January 2012	1 February 2012	4 February 2012	8 February 2012	13 February 2012	16 February 2012
Date of poll	8 February 2012	11 February 2012	15 February 2012	19 February 2012	23 February 2012	28 February 2012	3 March 2012
Date of counting of votes	6 March 2012						

Phase
I (55 ACs, 10 Districts)	II (59 ACs, 9 Districts)	III (56 ACs, 10 Districts)	IV (56 ACs, 11 Districts)	V (49 ACs, 13 Districts)	VI (68 ACs, 13 Districts)	VII (60 ACs, 10 Districts)
Sitapur; Barabanki; Ambedkar Nagar; Balrampur; Siddharthnagar; Faizabad; Bahraich; Shravasti; Gonda; Basti	Sant Kabir Nagar; Maharajganj; Gorakhpur; Kushinagar; Deoria; Ballia; Azamgarh; Mau; Ghazipur	Amethi; Sultanpur; Kaushambi; Allahabad; Jaunpur; Chandauli; Varanasi; Bhadohi; Mirzapur; Sonbhadra	Amethi; Hardoi; Unnao; Lucknow; Rae Bareli; Banda; Fatehpur; Chitrakoot; Pratapgarh; Farrukhabad; Kannauj	Firozabad; Kasganj; Etah; Mainpuri; Etawah; Auraiya; Kanpur Dehat; Kanpur Nagar; Jalaun; Jhansi; Lalitpur; Hamirpur; Mahoba	Saharanpur; Shamli; Muzaffarnagar; Meerut; Baghpat; Ghaziabad; Hapur; Gautam Budh Nagar; Bulandshahr; Aligarh; Mathura; Agra; Hathras	Bijnor; Moradabad; Sambhal; Rampur; Amroha; Budaun; Bareilly; Shahjahanpur; Pilibhit; Lakhimpur Kheri

Phase	Date	Constituency (with ECI Assembly constituency number)
I	8 February	145. Maholi, 146. Sitapur 147. Hargaon (SC) 148. Laharpur 149. Biswan 150. Sevata 151. Mahmoodabad 152. Sidhauli (SC) 153. Misrikh (SC) 266. Kursi 267. Ram Nagar 268. Barabanki 269. Zaidpur (SC) 270. Dariyabad 271. Rudauli 272. Haidergarh (SC) 273. Milkipur (SC) 274. Bikapur 275. Ayodhya 276. Goshainganj 277. Katehari 278. Tanda 279. Alapur (SC) 280. Jalalpur 281. Akbarpur 282. Balha (SC) 283. Nanpara 284. Matera 285. Mahasi 286. Bahraich 287. Payagpur 288. Kaiserganj 289. Bhinga 290. Shrawasti 291. Tulsipur 292. Gainsari 293. Utraula 294. Balrampur (SC) 295. Mehnaun 296. Gonda 297. Katra Bazar 298. Colonelganj 299. Tarabganj 300. Mankapur (SC) 301. Gaura 302. Shohratgarh 303. Kapilvastu (SC) 304. Bansi 305. Itwa 306. Domariyaganj 307. Harraiya 308. Kaptanganj 309. Rudhauli 310. Basti Sadar 311. Mahadewa (SC)
II	11 February	312. Menhdawal, 313. Khalilabad 314. Dhanghata (SC) 315. Pharenda 316. Nautanwa 317. Siswa 318. Maharajganj (SC) 319. Paniyra 320. Caimpiyarganj 321. Pipraich 322. Gorakhpur Urban 323. Gorakhpur Rural 324. Sahajanwa 325. Khajani (SC) 326. Chauri-Chaura 327. Bansgaon (SC) 328. Chillupar 329. Khadda 330. Padrauna 331. Tamkuhi Raj 332. Fazilnagar 333. Kushinagar 334. Hata 335. Ramkola (SC) 336. Rudrapur 337. Deoria 338. Pathardeva 339. Rampur Karkhana 340. Bhatpar Rani 341. Salempur (SC) 342. Barhaj 343. Atrauliya 344. Gopalpur 345. Sagri 346. Mubarakpur 347. Azamgarh 348. Nizamabad 349. Phoolpur-Pawai 350. Didarganj 351. Lalganj (SC) 352. Mehnagar (SC) 353. Madhuban 354. Ghosi 355. Muhammadabad- Gohna (SC) 356. Mau 357. Belthara Road (SC) 358. Rasara 359. Sikanderpur 360. Phephana 361. Ballia Nagar 362. Bansdih 363. Bairia 373. Jakhanian (SC) 374. Saidpur (SC) 375. Ghazipur 376. Jangipur 377. Zahoorabad 378. Mohammadabad 379. Zamania
III	15 February	184. Jagdishpur (SC), 185.Gauriganj 186.Amethi 187. Isauli 188. Sultanpur 189. Sadar 190. Lambhua 191. Kadipur (SC) 251. Sirathu 252. Manjhanpur (SC) 253. Chail 254. Phaphamau 255. Soraon (SC) 256. Phulpur 257. Pratappur 258. Handia 259. Meja 260. Karachhana 261.Allahabad West 262.Allahabad North 263.Allahabad South 264. Bara (SC) 265. Koraon (SC) 364. Badlapur 365. Shahganj 366. Jaunpur 367. Malhani 368.Mungra Badshahpur 369. Machhlishahr (SC) 370. Mariyahu 371. Zafrabad 372. Kerakat (SC) 380.Mughalsarai 381. Sakaldiha 382. Saiyadraja 383. Chakia (SC) 384. Pindra 385.Ajagara (SC) 386. Shivpur 387. Rohaniya 388. Varanasi North 389. Varanasi South 390. Varanasi Cantt. 391. Sevapuri 392. Bhadohi 393.Gyanpur 394.Aurai (SC) 395.Chhanbey (SC) 396. Mirzapur 397. Majhawan 398. Chunar 399. Marihan 400.Ghorawal 401. Robertsganj 402.Obra 403. Duddhi (SC)
IV	19 February	154. Sawayazpur, 155. Shahabad 156. Hardoi 157.Gopamau (SC) 158. Sandi (SC) 159. Bilgram Mallanwan 160. Balamau (SC) 161. Sandila 162. Bangermau 163. Safipur (SC) 164.Mohan (SC) 165. Unnao 166. Bhagwantnagar 167. Purwa 168. Malihabad (SC) 169. Bakshi Kaa Talab 170. Sarojini Nagar 171. Lucknow West 172. Lucknow North 173. Lucknow East 174. Lucknow Central 175. Lucknow Cantt. 176.Mohanlalganj (SC) 177. Bachhrawan (SC) 178. Tiloi 179. Harchandpur 180. Rae Bareli 181. Salon (SC) 182. Sareni 183. Unchahar 192. Kaimganj (SC) 193.Amritpur 194. Farrukhabad 195. Bhojpur 196. Chhibramau 197. Tirwa 198. Kannauj (SC) 232. Tindwari 233. Baberu 234. Naraini (SC) 235. Banda 236. Chitrakoot 237. Manikpur 238. Jahanabad 239. Bindki 240. Fatehpur 241. Ayah Shah 242. Husainganj 243. Khaga (SC) 244. Rampur Khas 245. Babaganj (SC) 246. Kunda 247. Vishwanath Ganj 248. Pratapgarh 249. Patti 250. Raniganj
V	23 February	95.Tundla (SC), 96.Jasrana 97.Firozabad 98.Shikohabad 99.Sirsaganj 100. Kasganj 101.Amanpur 102. Patiyali 103.Aliganj 104. Etah 105. Marhara 106. Jalesar (SC) 107. Mainpuri 108. Bhongaon 109. Kishni (SC) 110. Karhal 199. Jaswantnagar 200. Etawah 201. Bharthana (SC) 202. Bidhuna 203. Dibiyapur 204.Auraiya (SC) 205. Rasulabad (SC) 206.Akbarpur-Raniya 207. Sikandra 208. Bhognipur 209. Bilhaur (SC) 210. Bithoor 211. Kalyanpur 212.Govindnagar 213. Sishamau 214.Arya Nagar 215. Kidwai Nagar 216. Kanpur Cantt. 217. Maharajpur 218.Ghatampur (SC) 219. Madhaugarh 220. Kalpi 221.Orai (SC) 222. Babina 223. Jhansi Nagar 224. Mauranipur (SC) 225.Garautha 226. Lalitpur 227. Mehroni (SC) 228. Hamirpur 229. Rath (SC) 230. Mahoba 231. Charkhari
VI	28 February	1. Behat, 2. Nakur 3. Saharanpur Nagar 4. Saharanpur 5. Deoband 6. Rampur Maniharan (SC) 7. Gangoh 8. Kairana 9. Thana Bhawan 10.Shamli 11.Budhana 12.Charthawal 13.Purqazi (SC) 14.Muzaffar Nagar 15.Khatauli 16.Meerapur 43.Siwalkhas 44.Sardhana 45.Hastinapur (SC) 46.Kithore 47.Meerut Cantt. 48.Meerut 49.Meerut South 50.Chhaprauli 51.Baraut 52.Baghpat 53.Loni 54.Muradnagar 55.Sahibabad 56.Ghaziabad 57.Modi Nagar 58.Dhaulana 59.Hapur (SC) 60.Garhmukteshwar 61.Noida 62.Dadri 63.Jewar 64.Sikandrabad 65.Bulandshahr 66.Syana 67.Anupshahr 68.Debai 69.Shikarpur 70.Khurja (SC) 71.Khair (SC) 72. Barauli 73.Atrauli 74.Chharra 75.Koil 76.Aligarh 77.Iglas (SC) 78.Hathras (SC) 79.Sadabad 80.Sikandra Rao 81.Chhata 82.Mant 83.Goverdhan 84.Mathura 85.Baldev (SC) 86.Etmadpur 87.Agra Cantt. (SC) 88.Agra South 89.Agra North 90.Agra Rural (SC) 91.Fatehpur Sikri 92.Kheragarh 93.Fatehabad 94.Bah
VII	3 March	17. Najibabad, 18. Nagina (SC) 19. Barhapur 20. Dhampur 21. Nehtaur (SC) 22. Bijnor 23. Chandpur 24. Noorpur 25. Kanth 26. Thakurdwara 27. Moradabad Rural 28. Moradabad Nagar 29. Kundarki 30. Bilari 31. Chandausi (SC) 32. Asmoli 33. Sambhal 34. Suar 35. Chamraua 36. Bilaspur 37. Rampur 38. Milak (SC) 39. Dhanaura (SC) 40. Naugawan Sadat 41. Amroha 42. Hasanpur 111. Gunnaur 112. Bisauli (SC) 113. Sahaswan 114. Bilsi 115. Badaun 116. Shekhupur 117. Dataganj 118. Baheri 119. Meerganj 120. Bhojipura 121. Nawabganj 122. Faridpur (SC) 123. Bithari Chainpur 124. Bareilly 125. Bareilly Cantt. 126. Aonla 127. Pilibhit 128. Barkhera 129. Puranpur (SC) 130. Bisalpur 131. Katra 132. Jalalabad 133. Tilhar 134. Powayan (SC) 135. Shahjahanpur 136. Dadraul 137. Palia 138. Nighasan 139. Gola Gokrannath 140. Sri Nagar (SC) 141. Dhaurahra 142. Lakhimpur 143. Kasta (SC) 144. Mohammdi

== Parties ==
A total of 223 parties vied for the 403 seats in the legislative assembly. This was an increase compared to the previous election which featured 131 parties who had filed candidates. The parties represented in the previous legislature were:

- Bahujan Samaj Party (BSP) (incumbent) (contested 403 seats)
- Samajwadi Party (SP) (Resulting majority elected to power)
- Bharatiya Janata Party (BJP)
- Indian National Congress (INC) (pre-election alliance with RLD)
- Rashtriya Lok Dal (RLD) (pre-election alliance with INC)
- Rashtriya Parivartan Dal
- Akhil Bhartiya Loktantrik Congress
- United Democratic Party
- Bharatiya Jan Shakti
- Jan Morcha
- Rashtriya Swabhimaan Party
- Peace Party of India
- Apna Dal
- Quami Ekta Dal
- JD(U)
- All India Trinamool Congress
- Communist Party of India
- Communist Party of India (Marxist)

== Parties and alliances ==
Alliance/Party		Flag	Symbol	Leader	Seats contested	
Bahujan Samaj Party				Mayawati	403	
NDA	Bharatiya Janata Party			Uma Bharthi	398	402
NDA	Janvadi Party (Socialist)				4	402
UPA	Indian National Congress			Raj Babbar	355	401
UPA	Rashtriya Lok Dal			Chaudhary Ajit Singh	46	401
Samajwadi Party				Mulayam Singh Yadav	401	

== 2010 issues ==
In 2010, INC general secretary Rahul Gandhi was arrested, along with, while he was staging a sit-in in Bhatta Parsaul village in support of farmers agitating against inadequate compensation for the acquisition of their land for a highway project. Though he was released after three hours, INC party members in other parts of the country such as Mumbai's western suburbs of Santacruz, Malad and Borivali protested against his arrest. Amidst the event he said: "I have seen the violence unleashed on your youth and women. By seeing what has happened here, I feel ashamed to be an Indian. The state government [sic] is tormenting its own people." Though INC party spokesman Subodh Srivastava said that "several party leaders and workers were injured in the lathicharge by police at a number of places in the state (sic) during peaceful protest and demonstration. (sic) More than 10,000 workers and leaders were arrested across the state," the UP government said that there was no impact as a result of the INC agitation and that only 135 people had been arrested in apprehension of breach of peace during the ensuing chakka jam (Note: Chakka Jam is a term used in India and Nepal for the "deliberate creation of traffic jams as a form of political and social protest".) in protest against Gandhi's arrest. Mayawati responded also to the Gandhi agitation by saying: "I would like to tell Yuvraj that whatever struggle he has to do, he should do in his home first, as the decision is in the hands of the Centre...It seems that he is not being heard in his own home and he is venting his frustration by indulging in mean dramatics."

The same day his mother, Sonia Gandhi, visited her national constituency of Rae Bareli to review the implementation of such nationally sponsored rural employment and housing schemes as the Mahatma Gandhi National Rural Employment Guarantee Act where she called for better implementation of the various schemes such as to ensure that 100 days of employment would be provided to a maximum number of families.

Under the pretext of land acquisition, the action was read as having gathered pace as after other legislative elections. The Times of India read the move as "a bigger favour from jittery chief minister Mayawati" and that the "subsequent free-for-all" included INC staging anti-Mayawati protests as well as BJP leaders trying not to be undone by "also courting trouble" on the basis of "land-related strife everywhere...giving politicians scope for photo ops." It also said that Mayawati may have had a "point in lobbing the land acquisition ball back into the Centre's (national government) court" but that attempts to "keeping law and order will only make her opponents look good for being martyred;" while it still question if the INC were "genuinely friends of farmers, tribals, Dalits, et al."

== Corruption issues ==
A Centre for Media Studies report showed that the corruption has increased in UP. The Central Bureau of Investigation said there was "strong evidence" against incumbent Chief Minister Mayawati in a case about disproportionate assets for a public figure; while Samajwadi party leader Mulayam Singh Yadav also has a case pending against him in a similar case. Out of a total of 403 MLAs, 143 face criminal charges.

The Chief Election Commissioner has raised concerns about the use of money in the election for some form of undue campaigning. After the EC imposed restrictions on the movement of unaccounted money, police checks across UP netted over 120 million in cash, several kilogrammes of silver and weapons, leading to the arrest of at least one person.

The Uttar Pradesh government was also sent a notice by the national government for alleged corruption in MGNREGA. Mayawati, however rejected the allegations as "politically motivated." She has also been accused by former minister Avdesh Verma of selling party tickets in the election for Rs. 40 million. Furthermore, the BSP also expelled Badshah Singh and Babu Singh Kushwaha, who had been removed after CBI evidence of corruption, from the party on charges of corruption.

During the tenure of the incumbent CM Mayawati, opposition parties have accused her of constructing parks and statues of herself and other dalit icons such as Ambedkar and Kanshi Ram in places such as Noida and Lucknow that cost the exchequer crores of rupees in the name of development and social upliftment for dalits. The Uttar Pradesh Government was also criticised by the Supreme Court for not halting the construction of the memorials. despite an order to do so. On 7 January the Chief Election Commissioner S. Y. Quraishi ordered for the veiling of statues of all political figures except for Mohandas Gandhi, as well as veiling the BSP's symbol the elephant, in order to have a "level playing field" by 11 January at 17:00, according to the District Magistrate of Gautam Budh Nagar, though Chief Electoral Officer Umesh Sinha said the deadline was 15 January but the government should try and do so earlier in view of the implementation of code of conduct. However, in Lucknow BSP activists were reported to have removed the a veil minutes after it had been installed. The BSP called the move as "completely wrong" and "not justified." Quraishi dismissed criticism of the order as "ill-informed" and add that he was "surprised [the order] has been taken as something unusual. There is a model code of conduct which says there should be a level-playing field for all candidates and parties." On 9 January, social activist Dheeraj Singh filed a PIL in the Allahabad High Court challenging the EC's order on the grounds that the elephants represent Ganesha and veiling them could hurt public sentiment. On 11 January the High Court dismissed the petition as "withdrawn" on technical grounds.

== Campaign ==
The INC's Rahul Gandhi started his campaign on 14 November 2011 before the announcement of the election phases, while Mulayam Singh Yadav started his campaign on 8 January with criticism of the ruling BSP for "corruption and atrocities on people." Rahul Gandhi toured one of the most impoverished area of the country on 17 January, Bundelkhand in Lalitpur. He also visited Mauranipur, Chirgaon, Jhansi and Mahoba, where he was reportedly shown black flags over the issue of black money. He promised to bring change, while also questioning the BSP government's alleged corruption in the MGNREGA scheme. Prime Minister Manmohan Singh addressed a rally in Kanpur on 17 February where he alleged that the U.P. government is not cooperating with the national government in regards to infrastructure development despite receiving five times the funds demanded. He also criticised the incumbent government's alleged corruption and U.P.'s infrastructure woes. "The reason behind this bad situation is that non- Congress governments which came to power in the state in the last 22 years did not pay attention either to governance or the problems of the common man. The Congress will win UP elections. Sonia Gandhi and Rahul Gandhi will ensure Congress' victory in UP...we will work with greater strength for the development of UP if the Congress comes to power. There is a need to change this situation. You need a government which changes the shape of UP and focuses on development by rising above caste and religious lines. Congress led by Sonia Gandhi and Rahul Gandhi can provide such a government." The INC also got the endorsement of the Jamiat Ulama-i-Hind. After the first three phases of voting the party was said to have been cautious about its expectations of winning the election.

The BJP formally began its campaign on 10 January, but would start hosting public meeting 10 days later. Party leaders from outside UP had been called in to campaign, though many refused to show support for candidates with corruption allegations. These included former PM Atal Behari Vajpayee, Gujarat CM Narendra Modi, former PM-candidate and Home Minister MP Lal Krishna Advani, MP Sushma Swaraj, former Law Minister MP Arun Jaitley. UP MP Murli Manohar Joshi, Madhya Pradesh CM Shivraj Singh Chouhan, Chhattisgarh CM Raman Singh, Jharkhand CM Arjun Munda, Bihar Deputy CM Sushil Modi, former Rajasthan CM Vasundhara Raje, Ananth Kumar, Ravi Shankar Prasad, Narendra Singh Tomar, party deputy leader in the Lok Sabha Gopinath Munde, party deputy leader in the Rajya Sabha SS Ahluwalia, party Muslim member Shahnawaz Hussain, party vice president Mukhtar Abbas Naqvi, MP Shatrughan Sinha, MP Hema Malini, MP Smriti Irani, MP Navjot Singh Sidhu, Kalraj Mishra, Vinay Katiyar, Ramlal, former Foreign Minister MP Yashwant Sinha, former Madhya Pradesh CM and re-inductee into the party Uma Bharti, UP MP Varun Gandhi, Ramapati Ram Tripathi, Keshari Nath Tripathi, Ramnath Kovind, Saudan Singh and Radha Mohan Singh. On 16 January, national BJP President Nitin Gadkari released the party manifesto for the election in Lucknow. Part of its promises included creating 15 million jobs within five years, as well providing rice and wheat at a subsidised Rs. 3 and Rs. 2 per kilogramme, respectively. It also included a promise to probe alleged cases of corruption during the tenure of the BSP government. On 18 January, they opted to field Uma Bharti from the Charkari constituency in Mahoba.

Incumbent CM Mayawati began her campaign on 27 January at a rally in Bijnor. On 15 January, she released the BSP's list of candidates for all the 403 constituencies. The list included 88 candidates belonging to SCs, 113 from OBCs, 85 religious minorities and 117 upper castes, out of which 74 are Brahmins.

On 20 January, the Samajwadi Party released its electoral manifesto in Lucknow which included promising reservation for the minorities, a ban on land acquisition and loans of four percent interest to small farmers. Party chief Mulayam Singh Yadav got an endorsement from the Shahi Imam of New Delhi's Jama Masjid Syed Ahmed Bukhari, who had appealed to Muslim voters to vote for the SP and alleged that the INC had regressed UP's fortunes.

The anti-corruption group Team Anna also decided to campaign in four of the five provinces that are holding Vidhan Sabha elections, except Manipur; however they said that they would not do so in favour of or against any particular party. They started their campaign in Haridwar on 21 January.

== Controversies ==
The Supreme Court also criticised the UP government for the Land Acquisition Act calling it "an engine of oppression" for the government's low cost acquisition without adequate redress for the villagers, who were then beaten by police. It said that the policy as "anti-poor" and against the interests of the "common man," while citing that after its inception in 1894 it had to be immediately amended. At the same time, INC general secretary Rahul Gandhi toured two villages to start an agitation march against such acquisitions

On 22 December 2011 the national government announced a four and half percent sub-quota for "backward Muslims" as part of an expanded definition of Other Backward Castes in the civil service and at educational institutions, which came into effect on 1 January. BJP leaders Sushma Swaraj and Arun Jaitley strongly objected to the proposal on the grounds that it was "unconstitutional" with the purpose of campaigning to wooing Muslim voters in the election. On 10 January, Minority Affairs Minister Salman Khurshid was sent a notice by the ECI on a complaint filed by the BJP, led by Mukhtar Abbas Naqvi, after Khurshid had said that if the INC was victorious in the election, it would double the quota for Muslims to nine percent. He then reiterated that the comments was a "promise not [an] allurement." The following day the ECI decided to put on hold the sub-quota for minorities till the election ends as it was in violation of the Model Code of Conduct.

The ECI replaced the UP DGP Brij Lal and Home Secretary Fateh Bahadur on 8 January after complaints from other parties that they were partisan on the issue of covering the statues.

On 22 January, the ECI banned exit polls from 28 January to 3 March in accordance with the relevant provisions of the Representation of the People Act, 1951. Opinion polls were also banned 48 hours prior to the voting of each phase in the electronic media, however there was no such restriction on the print media.

=== Individual candidates ===
After being fired from the BSP for corruption, Babu Singh Kushwaha, Badshah Singh and Awdhesh Verma joined the BJP. Kushwaha has wanted to join the INC but was blocked by Rahul Gandhi, who criticised the BJP for giving them tickets. Additionally, Daddan Mishra also resigned from the BSP after being denied a ticket to run in the election and consequently joined the BJP.

== Opinion polls ==
All opinion polls indicated a hung assembly.

Poll source and date	BSP	Samajwadi	BJP	INC-RLD	Others
STAR News-Nielsen	101	135	61	99	7
News24	108	127	57	94	17

== Election ==
Almost all the exit polls pointed to a hung assembly with the SP outperforming its rivals while the BSP lost a large share of the seats it previously held. The INC and the BJP also were expected to perform better than the previous election but significantly short of the simple majority mark.

Poll source and date	BSP	SP	BJP	INC-RLD	Others
STAR News-Nielsen	83	183	71	51	11
CNN-IBN	65–70	232–250	28–38	36–44	11–23
Aaj Tak	88–98	195–210	50–56	38–42	20

== Result ==
The BSP's CM Mayawati's cabinet approving the dissolution of the Vidhan Sabha assembly on the night of 4 March and sent the recommendation to the Governor for consent. Mulayam Singh Yadav's son and UP president of the Samajwadi Party Akhilesh Yadav was nominated as Chief Minister by the party.

Vote Share by party (Uttar Pradesh Assembly Election, 2012)
1. SP (29.1%)
2. BSP (25.9%)
3. BJP (15.0%)
4. INC (11.6%)
5. RLD (2.33%)
6. Peace Party of India (2.82%)
7. Other (13.2%)

Summary of the Uttar Pradesh Legislative Assembly election, 2012 result
Party	Seats contested	Seats won	Seat change	Vote share	Swing
Samajwadi Party	401	224	▲127	29.15%	▲3.72%
Bahujan Samaj Party	403	80	▼126	25.91%	▼4.52%
Bharatiya Janata Party	398	47	▼4	15%	▼1.97%
Indian National Congress	355	28	▲6	11.63%	▲3.03%
Rashtriya Lok Dal	46	9	▼1	2.33%	
Peace Party of India	208	4	▲4	2.82%	▲2.82%
Quami Ekta Dal	43	2		0.55%	
Apna Dal	76	1	▲1	0.90%	
Nationalist Congress Party	127	1	0	0.33%	
Ittehad-e-Millat Council	18	1		0.25%	
Independents	1691	6		4.13%	
Total	-	403	-		
Turnout: 59.5%
Source: Election Commission of India Archived 18 December 2014 at the Wayback Machine

=== Results by district ===
District	Seats						
District	Seats	SP	BSP	BJP	INC	RLD	OTH
Agra	9	1	6	2	—N/a	—N/a	—N/a
Aligarh	7	4	—N/a	—N/a	—N/a	3	—N/a
Ambedkar Nagar	5	5	—N/a	—N/a	—N/a	—N/a	—N/a
Amethi	7	5	—N/a	—N/a	2	—N/a	—N/a
Amroha	4	4	—N/a	—N/a	—N/a	—N/a	—N/a
Auraiya	3	3	—N/a	—N/a	—N/a	—N/a	—N/a
Ayodhya	5	4	—N/a	1	—N/a	—N/a	—N/a
Azamgarh	10	9	1	—N/a	—N/a	—N/a	—N/a
Bagpat	3	—N/a	2	—N/a	—N/a	1	—N/a
Bahraich	7	2	1	2	2	—N/a	—N/a
Ballia	7	5	1	1	—N/a	—N/a	—N/a
Balrampur	4	4	—N/a	—N/a	—N/a	—N/a	—N/a
Banda	4	1	1	—N/a	2	—N/a	—N/a
Barabanki	6	6	—N/a	—N/a	—N/a	—N/a	—N/a
Bareilly	9	3	2	3	—N/a	—N/a	1
Basti	5	2	2	—N/a	1	—N/a	—N/a
Bhadohi	3	3	—N/a	—N/a	—N/a	—N/a	—N/a
Bijnor	8	2	4	2	—N/a	—N/a	—N/a
Budaun	6	4	2	—N/a	—N/a	—N/a	—N/a
Bulandshahr	7	2	2	1	2	—N/a	—N/a
Chandauli	4	1	1	—N/a	—N/a	—N/a	2
Chitrakoot	2	1	1	—N/a	—N/a	—N/a	—N/a
Deoria	7	5	—N/a	1	1	—N/a	—N/a
Etah	4	4	—N/a	—N/a	—N/a	—N/a	—N/a
Etawah	3	3	—N/a	—N/a	—N/a	—N/a	—N/a
Farrukhabad	4	3	—N/a	—N/a	—N/a	—N/a	1
Fatehpur	6	2	3	1	—N/a	—N/a	—N/a
Firozabad	5	3	1	1	—N/a	—N/a	—N/a
G. B. Nagar	3	—N/a	2	1	—N/a	—N/a	—N/a
Ghaziabad	5	—N/a	4	—N/a	—N/a	1	—N/a
Ghazipur	7	6	—N/a	—N/a	—N/a	—N/a	1
Gonda	7	6	—N/a	1	—N/a	—N/a	—N/a
Gorakhpur	9	1	4	3	—N/a	—N/a	1
Hamirpur	2	—N/a	—N/a	1	1	—N/a	—N/a
Hapur	3	2	—N/a	—N/a	1	—N/a	—N/a
Hardoi	8	6	2	—N/a	—N/a	—N/a	—N/a
Hathras	3	1	2	—N/a	—N/a	—N/a	—N/a
Jalaun	3	1	1	—N/a	1	—N/a	—N/a
Jaunpur	9	7	—N/a	1	1	—N/a	—N/a
Jhansi	4	2	1	1	—N/a	—N/a	—N/a
Kannauj	3	3	—N/a	—N/a	—N/a	—N/a	—N/a
Kanpur Dehat	4	3	1	—N/a	—N/a	—N/a	—N/a
Kanpur Nagar	10	5	—N/a	4	1	—N/a	—N/a
Kasganj	3	2	1	—N/a	—N/a	—N/a	—N/a
Kaushambi	3	—N/a	2	1	—N/a	—N/a	—N/a
Kushinagar	7	3	1	1	2	—N/a	—N/a
Lakhimpur Kheri	8	4	3	1	—N/a	—N/a	—N/a
Lalitpur	2	—N/a	2	—N/a	—N/a	—N/a	—N/a
Lucknow	9	7	—N/a	1	1	—N/a	—N/a
Maharajganj	5	2	1	1	1	—N/a	—N/a
Mahoba	2	—N/a	1	1	—N/a	—N/a	—N/a
Mainpuri	4	4	—N/a	—N/a	—N/a	—N/a	—N/a
Mathura	5	—N/a	1	—N/a	1	3	—N/a
Mau	4	2	1	—N/a	—N/a	—N/a	1
Meerut	7	3	—N/a	4	—N/a	—N/a	—N/a
Mirzapur	5	3	1	—N/a	1	—N/a	—N/a
Moradabad	6	4	—N/a	1	—N/a	—N/a	1
Muzaffarnagar	6	2	3	—N/a	—N/a	1	—N/a
Pilibhit	4	3	—N/a	1	—N/a	—N/a	—N/a
Pratapgarh	7	4	—N/a	—N/a	1	—N/a	2
Prayagraj	12	8	3	—N/a	1	—N/a	—N/a
Raebareli	3	2	—N/a	—N/a	—N/a	—N/a	1
Rampur	5	2	1	—N/a	2	—N/a	—N/a
Saharanpur	7	1	4	1	1	—N/a	—N/a
Sambhal	4	4	—N/a	—N/a	—N/a	—N/a	—N/a
Sant Kabir Nagar	3	2	—N/a	—N/a	—N/a	—N/a	1
Shahjahanpur	6	3	2	1	—N/a	—N/a	—N/a
Shamli	3	—N/a	—N/a	2	1	—N/a	—N/a
Shrawasti	2	2	—N/a	—N/a	—N/a	—N/a	—N/a
Siddharthnagar	5	3	—N/a	1	—N/a	—N/a	1
Sitapur	9	7	2	—N/a	—N/a	—N/a	—N/a
Sonbhadra	4	2	1	—N/a	—N/a	—N/a	1
Sultanpur	5	5	—N/a	—N/a	—N/a	—N/a	—N/a
Unnao	6	5	1	—N/a	—N/a	—N/a	—N/a
Varanasi	8	1	2	3	1	—N/a	1
Total	403	224	80	47	28	9	15

=== Result by constituency ===
Constituency		Turnout	Winner				Runner-up				Margin
#	Name	%	Candidate	Party	Votes	%	Candidate	Party	Votes	%	Margin
Saharanpur District
1	Behat	72.91	Mahaveer Singh Rana	BSP	70,274	31.78	Naresh	INC	69,760	31.55	514
2	Nakur	77.18	Dr. Dharam Singh Saini	BSP	89,187	38.65	Imran Masood	INC	84,623	36.67	4,564
3	Saharanpur Nagar	62.83	Raghav Lakhanpal	BJP	85,170	38.8	Saleem Ahmed	INC	72,544	33.05	12,626
4	Saharanpur	73.79	Jagpal	BSP	80,670	39.57	Ch. Abdul Wahid	INC	63,557	31.17	17,113
5	Deoband	67.00	Rajendra Singh Rana	SP	66,682	34.05	Manoj Chaudhary	BSP	63,632	32.5	3,050
6	Rampur Maniharan	73.30	Ravinder Kumar Molhu	BSP	77,274	39.53	Vinod Kumar Tejyan	INC	50,668	25.92	26,606
7	Gangoh	72.21	Pardeep Kumar	INC	65,149	28.44	Ruder Sain	SP	61,126	26.68	4,023
Shamli District
8	Kairana	66.03	Hukum Singh	BJP	80,293	45.17	Anwar Hasan	BSP	60,750	34.17	19,543
9	Thana Bhawan	61.41	Suresh Kumar	BJP	53,719	30.68	Ashraf Ali Khan	RLD	53,454	30.52	265
10	Shamli	60.91	Pankaj Kumar Malik	INC	53,947	32.05	Virendra Singh	SP	50,206	29.83	3,741
Muzaffarnagar District
11	Budhana	58.30	Nawazish Alam Khan	SP	68,210	35.45	Rajpal Singh Baliyan	RLD	57,622	29.95	10,588
12	Charthawal	59.22	Noor Saleem Rana	BSP	53,481	31.02	Vijay Kumar	BJP	40,775	23.65	12,706
13	Purqazi	59.53	Anil Kumar	BSP	53,491	31.94	Deepak Kumar	INC	44,583	26.62	8,908
14	Muzaffar Nagar	56.10	Chitranjan Swaroop	SP	59,169	34.96	Ashok Kansal	BJP	44,167	26.09	15,002
15	Khatauli	62.53	Kartar Singh Bhadana	RLD	46,722	27.45	Tara Chand Shastri	BSP	40,847	24.0	5,875
16	Meerapur	61.76	Jamil Ahmad Qasmi	BSP	56,802	33.66	Mithlesh Pal	RLD	44,069	26.12	12,733
Bijnor District
17	Najibabad	61.77	Tasleem	BSP	62,713	33.54	Rajeev Kumar Agarwal	BJP	51,130	27.35	11,583
18	Nagina	60.94	Manoj Kumar Paras	SP	83,997	46.04	Omwati Devi	BSP	57,451	31.49	26,546
19	Barhapur	66.34	Mohd.ghazi	BSP	68,436	33.83	Indra Dev Singh	BJP	41,061	20.3	27,375
20	Dhampur	63.78	Th. Mool Chand Chauhan	SP	53,365	33.12	Ashok Kumar Rana	BSP	52,801	32.77	564
21	Nehtaur	63.89	Om Kumar	BSP	51,389	31.26	Raj Kumar	SP	31,991	19.46	19,398
22	Bijnor	65.88	Kunvar Bharatendra	BJP	68,969	32.94	Mahboob	BSP	51,133	24.42	17,836
23	Chandpur	67.59	Iqbal	BSP	54,941	29.2	Shairbaz Khan	SP	39,928	21.22	15,013
24	Noorpur	65.51	Lokendra Singh	BJP	47,566	26.94	Mohd.usmaan	BSP	42,093	23.84	5,473
Moradabad District
25	Kanth	66.41	Aneesurrehman	PECP	37,092	18.48	Rizwan Ahmad Khan	BSP	35,558	17.72	1,534
26	Thakurdwara	71.18	Kunwar Servesh Kumar	BJP	84,530	38.39	Vijay Kumar	MD	46,556	21.14	37,974
27	Moradabad Rural	59.14	Shameemul Haq	SP	72,213	39.98	Suresh Chandra Saini	BJP	49,477	27.39	22,736
28	Moradabad Nagar	53.85	Mohammad Yusuf Ansari	SP	88,341	42.18	Ritesh Kumar Gupta	BJP	68,103	32.52	20,238
29	Kundarki	70.92	Mohammad Rizwan	SP	81,302	37.03	Ramveer Singh	BJP	64,101	29.2	17,201
30	Bilari	64.70	Mhd.irfan	SP	55,694	29.45	Lakhan Singh Saini	BSP	54,154	28.63	1,540
Sambhal District
31	Chandausi	60.88	Laxmi Gautam	SP	55,871	29.11	Gulab Devi	BJP	51,864	27.03	4,007
32	Asmoli	70.17	Pinki Singh	SP	73,873	35.36	Aqeel ur Rehman Khan	BSP	47,484	22.73	26,389
33	Sambhal	66.38	Iqbal Mehmood	SP	79,820	40.7	Rajesh Singhal	BJP	49,773	25.38	30,047
Rampur District
34	Suar	62.02	Nawab Kazim Ali Khan urf	INC	55,469	33.26	Laxmi Saini	BJP	41,754	25.04	13,715
35	Chamraua	61.61	Ali Yusuf Ali	BSP	37,083	22.42	Naseer Ahmad Khan	SP	35,237	21.3	1,846
36	Bilaspur	65.61	Sanjay Kapoor	INC	52,818	27.2	Beena Bhardwaj	SP	42,641	21.96	10,177
37	Rampur	54.33	Mohammad Azam Khan	SP	95,772	55.31	Dr. Tanveer Ahmad Khan	INC	32,503	18.77	63,269
38	Milak	58.53	Vijay Singh	SP	56,798	31.54	Chandra Pal Singh	INC	36,635	20.34	20,163
Amroha District
39	Dhanaura	66.53	Maikal Chandra	SP	55,545	28.38	Hem Singh	BSP	47,916	24.48	7,629
40	Naugawan Sadat	72.57	Ashfaq Ali Khan	SP	55,626	27.47	Rahul Kumar	BSP	51,964	25.66	3,662
41	Amroha	66.61	Mehboob Ali	SP	60,807	34.4	Ram Singh	BJP	39,002	22.06	21,805
42	Hasanpur	71.71	Kamal Akhtar	SP	92,843	42.07	Ganga Saran	BSP	60,615	27.47	32,228
Meerut District
43	Siwalkhas	65.69	Ghulam Mohammed	SP	58,852	31.28	Yashvir Singh	RLD	55,265	29.37	3,587
44	Sardhana	72.43	Sangeet Singh Som	BJP	62,438	29.09	Hazi Mohammad Yaqub	RLD	50,164	23.38	12,274
45	Hastinapur	61.53	Prabhu Dayal Balmiki	SP	46,742	25.31	Yogesh Verma	PECP	40,101	21.71	6,641
46	Kithore	66.36	Shahid Manzoor	SP	73,015	36.3	Lakhi Ram Nagar	BSP	61,909	30.78	11,106
47	Meerut Cantt.	58.59	Satya Prakash Agarwal (	BJP	70,820	34.86	Sunil Kumar Wadhwa	BSP	67,207	33.08	3,613
48	Meerut	64.25	Dr. Laxmikant Bajpai	BJP	68,154	38.04	Rafeeq Ansari	SP	61,876	34.54	6,278
49	Meerut South	61.52	Ravindra Bhadana	BJP	71,584	32.79	Haji Rashid Akhlaq	BSP	61,800	28.31	9,784
Baghpat District
50	Chhaprauli	52.05	Vir Pal	RLD	69,394	47.69	Dev Pal Singh	BSP	47,823	32.86	21,571
51	Baraut	58.22	Lokesh Dixit	BSP	57,209	39.12	Ashwani Kumar	RLD	51,533	35.24	5,676
52	Baghpat	62.58	Hemlata Chaudhary	BSP	56,957	34.54	Kawkab Hameed Khan	RLD	49,294	29.9	7,663
Ghaziabad District
53	Loni	60.19	Zakir Ali	BSP	89,603	41.52	Madan Bhaiya	RLD	64,355	29.82	25,248
54	Muradnagar	62.34	Wahab	BSP	57,103	26.43	Rajpal Tyagi	SP	53,481	24.75	3,622
55	Sahibabad	49.31	Amarpal	BSP	124,332	37.26	Sunil Kumar Sharma	BJP	99,984	29.97	24,348
56	Ghaziabad	54.08	Suresh Bansal	BSP	64,485	35.57	Atul Garg	BJP	52,364	28.88	12,121
57	Modi Nagar	62.61	Sudesh Sharma	RLD	58,635	33.08	Rajpal Singh	BSP	44,686	25.21	13,949
Hapur District
58	Dholana	65.86	Dharmesh Singh Tomar	SP	59,150	29.24	Aslam	BSP	49,811	24.62	9,339
59	Hapur	62.32	Gajraj Singh	INC	77,242	41.78	Dharampal Singh	BSP	55,090	29.8	22,152
60	Garhmukteshwar	65.66	Madan Chauhan	SP	82,816	43.31	Farhat Hasan	BSP	64,617	33.79	18,199
Gautam Buddha Nagar District
61	Noida	48.97	Mahesh Kumar Sharma	BJP	77,319	36.87	Omdutt Sharma	BSP	49,643	23.67	27,676
62	Dadri	58.03	Satveer Singh Gurjar	BSP	81,137	40.68	Nawab Singh Nagar	BJP	43,840	21.98	37,297
63	Jewar	62.05	Vedram Bhati	BSP	67,524	37.82	Dhirendra Singh	INC	58,024	32.5	9,500
Bulandshahr District
64	Sikandrabad	60.67	Bimla Singh Solanki	BJP	45,799	22.31	Saleem Akhtar Khan	BSP	45,676	22.25	123
65	Bulandshahr	61.06	Mohd. Aleem Khan	BSP	76,646	37.18	Virendra Singh Sirohi	BJP	69,699	33.81	6,947
66	Syana	60.60	Dilnawaz Khan	INC	53,887	25.79	Devendera Bhardwaj	BSP	52,223	25.0	1,664
67	Anupshahr	59.33	Gajendra Singh	BSP	51,761	26.53	Syed Himayat Ali	SP	48,260	24.73	3,501
68	Debai	61.79	Shri Bhagwan Sharma	SP	62,969	34.37	Rajveer Singh	JaKP	59,372	32.4	3,597
69	Shikarpur	62.61	Mukesh Sharma	SP	64,498	34.98	Anil Kumar	BSP	56,095	30.43	8,403
70	Khurja	64.27	Banshi Singh Pahadiya	INC	98,913	47.13	Horam Singh	BSP	61,609	29.36	37,304
Aligarh District
71	Khair	59.16	Bhagwati Prasad	RLD	93,470	48.76	Rajrani	BSP	54,696	28.53	38,774
72	Barauli	66.37	Dalveer Singh	RLD	80,440	39.43	Thakur Jayveer Singh	BSP	68,417	33.54	12,023
73	Atrauli	62.83	Viresh Yadav	SP	54,785	26.63	Prem Lata Devi	JaKP	45,918	22.32	8,867
74	Chharra	63.61	Rakesh Kumar	SP	54,150	27.96	Mool Chand Baghel	BSP	49,364	25.49	4,786
75	Koil	60.20	Zameer Ullah Khan	SP	44,847	25.42	Vivek Bansal	INC	44,248	25.08	599
76	Aligarh	62.82	Zafar Alam	SP	68,291	36.95	Ashutosh Varshney	BJP	45,205	24.46	23,086
77	Iglas	61.56	Triloki Ram	RLD	66,146	34.7	Rajendra Kumar	BSP	57,953	30.4	8,193
Hathras District
78	Hathras	59.05	Genda Lal Chaudhary	BSP	59,161	28.88	Rajesh Kumar	BJP	50,488	24.65	8,673
79	Sadabad	60.54	Devendra Agrawal	SP	63,741	33.84	Satendra Sharma	BSP	58,554	31.09	5,187
80	Sikandra Rao	64.83	Ramveer Upadhyay	BSP	94,471	45.81	Yashpal Singh Chauhan	SP	93,408	45.3	1,063
Mathura District
81	Chhata	69.66	Tejpal Singh	RLD	94,757	45.04	Laxminarayan	BSP	80,163	38.1	14,594
82	Mant	70.38	Jayant Chaudhary	RLD	87,062	43.11	Pt. Shyam Sunder Sharma	AITC	71,007	35.16	16,055
83	Goverdhan	67.23	Rajkumar Rawat	BSP	63,725	34.76	Megh Shyam Singh	RLD	42,230	23.04	21,495
84	Mathura	56.01	Pradeep Mathur	INC	54,498	27.16	Devendra Kumar Sharma	BJP	53,997	26.91	501
85	Baldev	60.26	Pooran Prakash	RLD	79,364	41.53	Chandrabhan Singh	BSP	47,270	24.74	32,094
Agra District
86	Etmadpur	65.23	Dr. Dharampal Singh	BSP	79,982	33.9	Dr. Prem Singh Baghel	SP	71,478	30.29	8,504
87	Agra Cantt.	54.44	Gutiyari Lal Duwesh	BSP	67,786	32.47	Girraj Singh Dharmesh	BJP	61,371	29.4	6,415
88	Agra South	59.85	Yogendra Upadhyaya	BJP	74,324	37.77	Zulfiquar Ahmed Bhutto	BSP	51,364	26.1	22,960
89	Agra North	55.34	Jagan Prasad Garg	BJP	68,401	34.77	Rajesh Kumar Agrawal	BSP	45,045	22.9	23,356
90	Agra Rural	58.37	Kali Charan Suman	BSP	69,969	34.84	Hemlata	SP	51,123	25.46	18,846
91	Fatehpur Sikri	66.13	Surajpal Singh	BSP	67,191	33.09	Rajkumar Chahar	IND	61,568	30.32	5,623
92	Kheragarh	64.67	Bhagvan Singh Kushwaha	BSP	69,533	36.36	Rani Pakshalika Singh	SP	62,427	32.65	7,106
93	Fatehabad	69.53	Chotelal Verma	BSP	73,098	39.7	Rajendra Singh	SP	72,399	39.32	699
94	Bah	59.99	Raja Mahendra Aridaman	SP	99,379	54.07	Madhusudan Sharma	BSP	72,908	39.67	26,471
Firozabad District
95	Tundla	63.52	Rakesh Babu	BSP	67,949	32.79	Akhlesh Kumar	SP	60,003	28.96	7,946
96	Jasrana	66.56	Ramveer Singh	SP	104,440	51.31	Ram Gopal (pappu Lodhi)	BSP	75,804	37.24	28,636
97	Firozabad	62.88	Manish Asiza	BJP	74,878	33.67	Azim Bhai	SP	72,863	32.76	2,015
98	Shikohabad	61.99	Om Prakash Verma	SP	98,682	51.96	Dr.mukesh Verma	BSP	54,688	28.8	43,994
99	Sirsaganj	64.49	Hariom	SP	85,517	46.01	E. Atul Pratap Singh	BSP	45,502	24.48	40,015
Kasganj District
100	Kasganj	59.56	Man Pal Singh	SP	48,535	25.41	Hasrat Ullah Sherwani	BSP	38,356	20.08	10,179
101	Amanpur	58.45	Mamtesh	BSP	37,996	23.82	Virendra Singh	SP	34,340	21.53	3,656
102	Patiyali	57.55	Najeeva Khan Zeenat	SP	62,493	35.44	Suraj Singh Shakya	BSP	34,718	19.69	27,775
Etah District
103	Aliganj	66.66	Rameshwar Singh	SP	91,141	45.63	Sanghmitra Maurya	BSP	65,120	32.6	26,021
104	Etah	57.12	Ashish Kumar Yadav	SP	39,282	24.02	Gajendra Singh Babloo	BSP	36,038	22.04	3,244
105	Marhara	63.79	Amit Gaurav	SP	61,827	36.16	Virendra	JaKP	39,571	23.14	22,256
106	Jalesar	58.93	Ranjeet Suman	SP	55,391	36.97	Omprakash Dalit	BSP	32,822	21.91	22,569
Mainpuri District
107	Mainpuri	57.43	Rajkumar Alias Raju	SP	54,990	32.94	Rama Shakya	BSP	40,781	24.43	14,209
108	Bhongaon	59.28	Alok Kumar	SP	70,298	40.78	Ashish Singh Alias Rahul	BSP	39,622	22.99	30,676
109	Kishani	58.09	Eng. Brajesh Katheriya	SP	77,113	50.25	Km. Sandhya	BSP	42,063	27.41	35,050
110	Karhal	60.96	Sobaran Singh Yadav	SP	92,536	46.9	Jaivir Singh	BSP	61,593	31.22	30,943
Sambhal District
111	Gunnaur	59.14	Ramkhiladi Singh Yadav	SP	107,378	53.19	Ajit Kumar urf Raju	INC	60,720	30.08	46,658
Budaun District
112	Bisauli	57.85	Ashutosh Maurya urf	SP	89,457	44.33	Priti Sagar urf Pushpa	BSP	46,467	23.02	42,990
113	Sahaswan	62.48	Omkar Singh	SP	72,946	33.01	Mir Hadi Ali Alias Babar	BSP	65,919	29.83	7,027
114	Bilsi	60.55	Musarrat Ali Bittan	BSP	57,600	32.43	Vimal Krishan Aggrawal	SP	49,272	27.74	8,328
115	Badaun	61.80	Abid Raza Khan	SP	62,786	32.44	Mahesh Chandra Gupta	BJP	47,373	24.47	15,413
116	Shekhupur	62.70	Ashish Yadav	SP	68,533	32.76	Bhagvan Singh Shakya	INC	60,281	28.82	8,252
117	Dataganj	62.66	Sinod Kumar Shakya	BSP	63,626	29.64	Prempal Singh Yadav	SP	58,299	27.16	5,327
Bareilly District
118	Baheri	69.30	Ataurrehman	SP	48,172	23.98	Chhatra Pal Singh	BJP	48,154	23.97	18
119	Meerganj	66.39	Sultan Baig	BSP	57,446	31.23	Dr.d.c Verma	BJP	49,525	26.93	7,921
120	Bhojipura	69.56	Shazil Islam	IEMC	65,531	32.55	Virendra Singh Gangwar	SP	47,583	23.63	17,948
121	Nawabganj	73.06	Bhagwat Saran Gangwar	SP	67,022	35.58	Usha Gangwar	BSP	49,303	26.17	17,719
122	Faridpur	64.73	Dr. Siaram Sagar	SP	60,837	35.09	Dr. Shyam Bihari	BJP	44,050	25.41	16,787
123	Bithari Chainpur	68.63	Virendra Singh	BSP	55,972	26.87	Dharmendra Kumar	SP	52,557	25.23	3,415
124	Bareilly	54.31	Dr. Arun Kumar	BJP	68,983	37.19	Dr. Anil Sharma	SP	41,921	22.6	27,062
125	Bareilly Cantt.	53.31	Rajesh Agarwal	BJP	51,893	33.71	Fahim Sabir Ansari	SP	32,944	21.4	18,949
126	Aonla	66.30	Dharm Pal Singh	BJP	50,782	30.85	Mahipal Singh Yadav	SP	46,374	28.17	4,408
Pilibhit District
127	Pilibhit	66.17	Riaz Ahmad	SP	61,578	27.37	Sanjay Singh Gangwar	BSP	57,343	25.48	4,235
128	Barkhera	69.75	Hemraj Verma	SP	69,256	35.27	Jaidrath Alias	BJP	38,882	19.8	30,374
129	Puranpur	65.97	Peetam Ram	SP	73,847	32.98	Babu Ram	BJP	43,009	19.21	30,838
130	Bisalpur	71.33	Agys Ramsaran Verma	BJP	111,735	49.71	Anis Ahmad Khan Alias	INC	55,664	24.76	56,071
Shahjahanpur District
131	Katra	63.44	Rajesh Yadav	SP	51,025	27.51	Rajeev Kashyap	BSP	50,150	27.04	875
132	Jalalabad	66.77	Neeraj Kushawaha	BSP	76,406	37.97	Sharad Vir Singh	SP	75,856	37.69	550
133	Tilhar	65.57	Roshan Lal Verma	BSP	71,122	36.28	Anwar Ali urf Zaki ur	SP	60,415	30.82	10,707
134	Powayan	65.30	Sakuntla Devi	SP	59,871	28.78	Arun Kumar Sagar	BSP	50,973	24.5	8,898
135	Shahjahanpur	58.76	Suresh Kumar Khanna	BJP	81,581	45.0	Tanveer Khan	SP	65,403	36.08	16,178
136	Dadraul	69.80	Rammurti Singh Verma	SP	61,967	29.35	Rizwan Ali	BSP	57,088	27.04	4,879
Lakhimpur Kheri District
137	Palia	63.99	Harvindar Kumar Sahani	BSP	55,460	27.29	Krishna Gopal Patel	SP	49,541	24.37	5,919
138	Nighasan	64.31	Ajay	BJP	75,005	36.39	R A Usmani	SP	43,966	21.33	31,039
139	Gola Gokrannath	64.68	Vinay Tiwari	SP	82,439	37.04	Simmi Bano	BSP	63,110	28.35	19,329
140	Sri Nagar	64.81	Ramsaran	SP	69,776	37.46	Sripal Bhargva	BSP	37,898	20.35	31,878
141	Dhaurahra	68.31	Shamsher Bahadur Alias	BSP	64,139	30.54	Yashpal Chowdhary	SP	63,094	30.04	1,045
142	Lakhimpur	58.24	Utkarsh Verma Madhur	SP	82,713	38.65	Gyan Prakash Bajpai	BSP	44,720	20.9	37,993
143	Kasta	66.98	Sunil Kumar Lala	SP	88,548	45.29	Saurabh Singh Sonu	BSP	61,677	31.55	26,871
144	Mohammdi	65.12	Awasthi Bala Prasad	BSP	57,737	28.86	Imran Ahamad	SP	46,393	23.19	11,344
Sitapur District
145	Maholi	67.26	Anoop Kumar Gupta	SP	87,160	40.04	Mahesh Chandra Mishra	BSP	64,445	29.6	22,715
146	Sitapur	57.49	Radheyshyam Jaiswal	SP	58,370	29.68	Ayub Khan	BSP	48,072	24.44	10,298
147	Hargaon	69.67	Ramhet Bharti	BSP	73,889	38.36	R.p Chowdhary	SP	61,740	32.06	12,149
148	Laharpur	65.72	Mo. Jasmir Ansari	BSP	71,860	37.08	Anil Kumar Verma	INC	54,188	27.96	17,672
149	Biswan	67.96	Rampal Yadav	SP	74,441	38.19	Nirmal Verma	BSP	67,092	34.42	7,349
150	Sevata	66.90	Mahendra Kumar Singh	SP	49,510	28.08	Ammar Rizvi	INC	47,063	26.69	2,447
151	Mahmoodabad	70.41	Narendra Singh Verma	SP	86,580	46.59	Ahmad Anshari	BSP	66,991	36.05	19,589
152	Sidhauli	66.63	Manish Rawat	SP	73,714	36.65	Dr. Hargovind Bhargav	BSP	67,083	33.35	6,631
153	Misrikh	58.87	Ram Pal Rajwanshi	SP	61,346	32.76	Manish Kumar Rawat	BSP	59,824	31.94	1,522
Hardoi District
154	Sawaijpur	61.71	Rajani Tiwari	BSP	49,099	23.32	Padamarag Singh Yadav	JaKP	44,580	21.17	4,519
155	Shahabad	65.03	Babu Khan	SP	89,947	44.27	Asif Khan	BSP	78,813	38.79	11,134
156	Hardoi	59.24	Nitin Agarwal	SP	110,063	54.6	Raja Bux Singh	BSP	66,381	32.93	43,682
157	Gopamau	60.48	Shyam Prakash	SP	67,430	36.7	Aneeta Verma	BSP	61,227	33.32	6,203
158	Sandi	58.76	Rajeshwari	SP	66,325	38.12	Virendra Kumar	BSP	59,675	34.3	6,650
159	Bilgram-Mallanwan	64.33	Brijesh Kumar	BSP	64,768	30.5	Krishna Kumar Singh	SP	57,440	27.05	7,328
160	Balamau	54.74	Anil Verma	SP	67,800	38.24	Rampal Verma	BSP	67,627	38.14	173
161	Sandila	62.47	Kunwar Mahabir Singh	SP	84,644	43.87	Abdul Mannan	BSP	65,510	33.95	19,134
Unnao District
162	Bangermau	60.17	Badlu Khan	SP	55,528	31.14	Mohd. Irshad Khan	BSP	48,733	27.33	6,795
163	Safipur	58.73	Sudhir Kumar	SP	72,869	42.9	Ram Baran	BSP	63,815	37.57	9,054
164	Mohan	64.35	Radhey Lal Rawat	BSP	48,021	25.98	Mast Ram	BJP	38,852	21.02	9,169
165	Unnao	57.45	Deepak Kumar	SP	61,695	33.85	Pankaj Gupta	BJP	51,550	28.28	10,145
166	Bhagwantnagar	57.25	Kuldeep Singh Sengar	SP	69,514	33.45	Poonam Shukla	BJP	45,685	21.99	23,829
167	Purwa	59.78	Uday Raj	SP	85,073	40.94	Narendra Singh Lodhi	BSP	57,172	27.51	27,901
Lucknow District
168	Malihabad	65.35	Indal Kumar	SP	62,782	31.17	Kaushal Kishore	RCP	60,567	30.07	2,215
169	Bakshi Kaa Talab	67.09	Gomti Yadav	SP	79,629	36.76	Nakul Dubey	BSP	77,730	35.88	1,899
170	Sarojini Nagar	59.17	Sharda Pratap Shukla	SP	67,601	28.88	Shiv Shanker Singh	BSP	59,236	25.3	8,365
171	Lucknow West	49.98	Mohd Rehan	SP	49,912	29.35	Suresh Kumar Shrivastav	BJP	42,100	24.76	7,812
172	Lucknow North	50.25	Abhishek Mishra	SP	47,580	28.11	Dr. Neeraj Bora	INC	45,361	26.8	2,219
173	Lucknow East	53.11	Kalraj Mishra	BJP	68,726	36.31	Juhie Singh	SP	47,908	25.31	20,818
174	Lucknow Central	50.91	Ravidas Mehrotra	SP	62,622	37.05	Vidya Sagar Gupta	BJP	39,890	23.6	22,732
175	Lucknow Cantt.	50.47	Prof. Rita Bahuguna	INC	63,052	38.95	Suresh Chandra Tiwari	BJP	41,299	25.51	21,753
176	Mohanlalganj	64.72	Chandra Rawat	SP	69,488	33.48	Ajey Pushpa Rawat	BSP	45,971	22.15	23,517
Raebareli District
177	Bachhrawan	62.90	Ram Lal Akela	SP	59,576	32.43	Sushil Kumar Pasi	RSBP	31,628	17.21	27,948
Amethi District
178	Tiloi	59.16	Dr. Mohd. Muslim	INC	61,249	33.12	Mayankeshwar Sharan	SP	58,539	31.65	2,710
Raebareli District
179	Harchandpur	59.81	Surendra Vikram Singh	SP	51,262	31.09	Shiv Ganesh Lodhi	INC	37,069	22.49	14,193
180	Rae Bareli	60.11	Akhilesh Kumar Singh	PECP	75,588	39.73	Ram Pratap Yadav	SP	46,094	24.22	29,494
181	Salon	55.33	Ashakishore	SP	69,020	40.28	Shiv Balak Pasi	INC	48,443	28.27	20,577
182	Sareni	58.57	Devendra Pratap Singh	SP	61,666	33.06	Sushil Kumar	BSP	48,747	26.13	12,919
183	Unchahar	64.82	Manoj Kumar Pandey	SP	61,930	33.18	Utkrist Maurya	BSP	59,348	31.8	2,582
Amethi District
184	Jagdishpur	53.78	Radhey Shyam	INC	56,309	32.55	Vijay Kumar	SP	50,912	29.43	5,397
185	Gauriganj	58.76	Rakesh Pratap Singh	SP	44,287	24.36	Mohammad Nayeem	INC	43,784	24.08	503
186	Amethi	55.05	Gayatri Prasad	SP	58,434	35.84	Ameeta Sinh	INC	49,674	30.47	8,760
Sultanpur District
187	Isauli	56.06	Abrar Ahmad	SP	48,813	28.61	Yash Bhadra Singh (monu)	PECP	34,872	20.44	13,941
188	Sultanpur	57.29	Anoop Sanda	SP	57,811	31.91	Mohd. Tahir Khan	BSP	50,999	28.15	6,812
189	Sadar	59.64	Arun Kumar	SP	71,939	42.97	Raj Prasad	BSP	51,032	30.48	20,907
190	Lambhua	59.68	Santosh Pandey	SP	74,352	41.25	Vinod Singh	BSP	56,980	31.61	17,372
191	Kadipur	59.21	Ramchandra Chaudhary	SP	97,283	51.4	Bhagelu Ram	BSP	59,173	31.26	38,110
Farrukhabad District
192	Kaimganj	58.79	Ajit Kumar	SP	56,279	28.79	Amar Singh	BJP	34,441	17.62	21,838
193	Amritpur	58.89	Narendra Singh Yadav	SP	50,911	32.13	Dr. Jitandra Singh Yadav	JaKP	31,940	20.16	18,971
194	Farrukhabad	55.12	Vijay Singh S/o Prem	IND	33,005	18.95	Major Suneel Dutt	BJP	32,858	18.86	147
195	Bhojpur	59.91	Jamaluddin Siddiqui	SP	51,650	29.97	Mukesh Rajput	JaKP	33,021	19.16	18,629
Kannauj District
196	Chhibramau	57.68	Arvind Singh Yadav	SP	70,372	31.34	Tahir Husain Siddiqui	BSP	67,946	30.26	2,426
197	Tirwa	57.27	Vyjai Bahadur Pal	SP	78,391	41.9	Kailash Singh Rajput	BSP	45,899	24.53	32,492
198	Kannauj	57.28	Anil Kumar Dohre	SP	95,702	46.11	Mahendra Nim Dohre	BSP	50,020	24.1	45,682
Etawah District
199	Jaswantnagar	64.21	Shivpal Singh Yadav	SP	133,563	61.9	Manish Yadav Pataray	BSP	52,479	24.32	81,084
200	Etawah	58.97	Raghuraj Singh Shakya	SP	74,874	37.37	Mahendra Singh Rajpoot	BSP	68,610	34.25	6,264
201	Bharthana	57.30	Sukh Devi Verma	SP	85,964	41.06	Raghvendra Kumar	BSP	67,999	32.48	17,965
Auraiya District
202	Bidhuna	60.30	Pramod Kumar	SP	72,226	36.11	Devesh Kumar	BSP	54,120	27.06	18,106
203	Dibiyapur	61.91	Pradeep Kumar	SP	76,819	43.35	Ram Ji	BSP	52,528	29.65	24,291
204	Auraiya	57.66	Madan Singh Alias	SP	63,477	36.49	Kuldeep	BSP	51,415	29.56	12,062
Kanpur Dehat District
205	Rasulabad	59.71	Shiv Kumar Beria	SP	66,940	39.46	Nirmala Sankhawar	BSP	50,105	29.53	16,835
206	Akbarpur - Raniya	64.77	Ramswaroop Singh	SP	69,148	37.12	Pratibha Shukla	BSP	67,905	36.46	1,243
207	Sikandra	61.44	Indrapal Singh	BSP	54,482	29.88	Devendra Singh Bhole	BJP	52,293	28.68	2,189
208	Bhognipur	64.27	Yogendra Pal Singh	SP	57,555	29.31	Dharm Pal Singh	BSP	52,902	26.94	4,653
Kanpur Nagar District
209	Bilhaur	61.48	Aruna Kumari Kori	SP	87,804	40.82	Kamlesh Chandra Divakar	BSP	71,747	33.36	16,057
210	Bithoor	62.19	Munindra Shukla	SP	61,081	29.82	Dr.ram Prakash	BSP	60,410	29.49	671
211	Kalyanpur	49.37	Satish Kumar Nigam	SP	44,789	29.97	Prem Lata Katiyar	BJP	42,406	28.38	2,383
212	Govindnagar	49.20	Satyadev Pachauri	BJP	57,156	35.33	Shailendra Dixit	INC	44,779	27.68	12,377
213	Sishamau	51.95	Haji Irfan Solanki	SP	56,496	42.17	Hanuman Swarup Mishra	BJP	36,833	27.5	19,663
214	Arya Nagar	49.78	Salil Vishnoi	BJP	51,200	40.73	Jitendra Bahadur Singh	SP	35,789	28.47	15,411
215	Kidwai Nagar	54.38	Ajay Kapoor	INC	63,400	35.82	Vivek Sheel Shukla	BJP	61,373	34.68	2,027
216	Kanpur Cantt.	48.46	Raghunandan Singh	BJP	42,551	29.48	Mohd.hasan Roomi	SP	33,243	23.03	9,308
217	Maharajpur	56.15	Satish Mahana	BJP	83,144	37.99	Shikha Mishra	BSP	53,255	24.34	29,889
218	Ghatampur	58.23	Indrajeet Kori	SP	50,669	28.54	Saroj Kureel	BSP	49,969	28.15	700
Jalaun District
219	Madhaugarh	61.58	Santram	BSP	71,671	28.54	Keshvendra Singh	SP	50,319	20.04	21,352
220	Kalpi	62.76	Umakanti	INC	64,289	28.89	Sanjay Singh	BSP	57,639	25.9	6,650
221	Orai	57.71	Dayashankar	SP	67,298	28.34	Satyendra Pratap	BSP	60,165	25.34	7,133
Jhansi District
222	Babina	68.78	Krishna Pal Singh	BSP	68,144	34.18	Chandrapal Singh Yadav	SP	61,189	30.69	6,955
223	Jhansi Nagar	57.03	Ravi Sharma	BJP	67,043	31.36	Sita Ram Kushwaha	BSP	58,963	27.58	8,080
224	Mauranipur	64.69	Dr. Rashmi Arya	SP	67,785	29.1	Rajendra Rahul Ahirwar	BSP	61,137	26.25	6,648
225	Garautha	66.11	Deepnarayan Singh	SP	70,041	33.72	Devesh Kumar Paliwal	BSP	54,243	26.11	15,798
Lalitpur District
226	Lalitpur	70.36	Ramesh Prasad	BSP	79,797	29.06	Chandra Bhusan Singh	SP	68,474	24.94	11,323
227	Mehroni	75.14	Feran Lal	BSP	70,847	25.93	Manohar Lal	BJP	69,110	25.29	1,737
Hamirpur District
228	Hamirpur	59.95	Sadhvi Niranjan Jyoti	BJP	63,762	27.59	Fateh Muhammad Khan	BSP	55,938	24.21	7,824
229	Rath	58.59	Gayadeen Anuragi	INC	91,295	40.48	Ambesh Kumari	SP	55,158	24.46	36,137
Mahoba District
230	Mahoba	62.43	Rajnarain Alias Rajju	BSP	43,963	25.19	Siddhgopal Sahu	SP	43,609	24.98	354
231	Charkhari	61.35	Uma Bharti	BJP	66,888	34.77	Kaptan Singh	SP	41,623	21.64	25,265
Banda District
232	Tindwari	57.60	Daljeet Singh	INC	61,184	37.69	Bishambhar Prasad	SP	46,169	28.44	15,015
233	Baberu	56.15	Vishambhar Singh	SP	41,642	24.24	Brij Mohan Singh	BSP	40,494	23.57	1,148
234	Naraini	58.60	Gayacharan Dinkar	BSP	52,195	30.14	Bharatlal Diwakar	SP	47,438	27.39	4,757
235	Banda	54.81	Vivek Kumar Singh	INC	49,455	32.1	Dinesh Chandra Shukla	BSP	41,853	27.16	7,602
Chitrakoot District
236	Chitrakoot	60.55	Veer Singh	SP	65,267	35.78	Ram Sevak	BSP	49,131	26.93	16,136
237	Manikpur	60.18	Chandrabhan Singh Patel	BSP	43,818	26.35	Shyamacharan Gupta	SP	40,121	24.13	3,697
Fatehpur District
238	Jahanabad	62.73	Madan Gopal Verma	SP	78,920	44.41	Sameer Trivedi	BSP	42,709	24.03	36,211
239	Bindki	61.47	Sukhadev Prasad Verma	BSP	49,090	27.9	Rajendra Singh Patel	BJP	41,128	23.37	7,962
240	Fatehpur	58.89	Shed Qasim Hasan	SP	49,830	26.77	Jeetendra Kumar Lodhi	BSP	46,044	24.74	3,786
241	Ayah Shah	58.95	Ayodhya Prasad Pal	BSP	49,339	33.8	Anand Prakash Lodhi	SP	38,242	26.2	11,097
242	Husainganj	62.50	Mo. Asif	BSP	44,757	26.11	Usha Devi Alias Anila	INC	41,906	24.44	2,851
243	Khaga	57.68	Krishna Paswan	BJP	59,234	33.68	Murli Dhar	BSP	40,312	22.92	18,922
Pratapgarh District
244	Rampur Khas	53.15	Pramod Kumar	INC	74,545	49.4	Hiramani Patel	BSP	43,011	28.5	31,534
245	Babaganj	49.90	Vinod Kumar	IND	69,332	49.29	Mahendra Kumar	BSP	27,266	19.38	42,066
246	Kunda	51.96	Raghuraj Pratap Singh	IND	111,392	67.96	Shiv Prakash Mishra	BSP	23,137	14.12	88,255
247	Bishwavnathganj	51.88	Raja Ram	SP	49,138	27.05	Sindhuja Mishra Senani	BSP	39,951	21.99	9,187
248	Pratapgarh	54.91	Nagendra Singh "munna	SP	43,754	25.95	Sanjay	BSP	36,244	21.5	7,510
249	Patti	58.46	Ram Singh	SP	61,434	32.28	Rajendra Pratap Singh	BJP	61,278	32.2	156
250	Raniganj	54.18	Pro. Shivakant Ojha	SP	63,076	38.96	Mansha Ahmad	BSP	50,472	31.17	12,604
Kaushambi District
251	Sirathu	58.88	Keshav Prasad	BJP	57,926	30.26	Anand Mohan	BSP	48,063	25.11	9,863
252	Manjhanpur	59.47	Indrajeet Saroj	BSP	91,000	43.64	Shiv Mohan Chaudhary	SP	86,818	41.63	4,182
253	Chail	53.79	Mohd Ashif Jafri	BSP	54,796	30.65	Chandra Bali	SP	53,506	29.93	1,290
Prayagraj District
254	Phaphamau	57.75	Ansar Ahmad	SP	51,950	29.17	Guru Prasad Maurya	BSP	46,654	26.2	5,296
255	Soraon	58.76	Satyaveer Munna	SP	61,153	32.88	Babu Lal 'bhawara'	BSP	47,852	25.73	13,301
256	Phulpur	59.91	Sayeed Ahamad	SP	72,898	38.75	Praveen Patel	BSP	64,998	34.55	7,900
257	Pratappur	57.42	Vijma Yadav	SP	62,582	34.18	Mohd.mujtaba Siddiqi	BSP	49,774	27.18	12,808
258	Handia	57.07	Maheshnarayan Singh	SP	88,475	48.51	Dr. Rakeshdhar Tripathi	PMSP	43,096	23.63	45,379
259	Meja	56.02	Girish Chandra Alias	SP	44,823	28.4	Anand Kumar Alias	BSP	44,083	27.93	740
260	Karachhana	58.69	Deepak Patel	BSP	68,341	38.1	Ujjwal Raman Singh	SP	67,937	37.88	404
261	Allahabad West	51.74	Pooja Pal	BSP	71,114	40.11	Atiq Ahamad	AD	62,229	35.1	8,885
262	Allahabad North	40.89	Anugrah Narayan Singh	INC	54,787	37.75	Harshvardhan Bajpayee	BSP	38,695	26.66	16,092
263	Allahabad South	45.05	Haji Parvej Ahmad (tanki)	SP	43,040	29.44	Nand Gopal Gupta Nandi	BSP	42,626	29.16	414
264	Bara	59.07	Dr.ajay Kumar	SP	46,182	26.75	Bholanath Chaudhary	BSP	42,426	24.58	3,756
265	Koraon	61.66	Rajbali Jaisal	BSP	44,755	24.79	Ramkripal	CPM	36,982	20.49	7,773
Barabanki District
266	Kursi	67.47	Fareed Mahfooj Kidwai	SP	80,183	34.17	Kumari Meeta Gautam	BSP	56,246	23.97	23,937
267	Ram Nagar	67.90	Arvind Kumar Singh 'gop'	SP	77,428	38.38	Amresh Kumar	BSP	45,204	22.41	32,224
268	Barabanki	64.17	Dharam Raj	SP	82,343	38.68	Sangram Singh	BSP	59,573	27.99	22,770
269	Zaidpur	66.28	Ramgopal	SP	76,869	33.79	Ved Prakash Rawat	BSP	53,828	23.66	23,041
270	Dariyabad	65.77	Rajeev Kumar Singh	SP	84,147	35.7	Vivekanand	BSP	64,253	27.26	19,894
Ayodhya District
271	Rudauli	60.55	Ram Chandra Yadav	BJP	61,173	32.66	Abbas Ali Zaidi Alias	SP	60,232	32.16	941
Barabanki District
272	Haidergarh	59.03	Ram Magan	SP	63,321	33.62	Ram Narayan	BSP	51,792	27.49	11,529
Ayodhya District
273	Milkipur	55.47	Audhesh Prasad	SP	73,803	42.24	Pavan Kumar	BSP	39,566	22.65	34,237
274	Bikapur	60.66	Mitrasen Yadav	SP	55,232	27.38	Firoz Khan urf Gabbar	BSP	53,364	26.45	1,868
275	Ayodhya	60.71	Tej Narayan Pandey Alias	SP	55,262	28.74	Lallu Singh	BJP	49,857	25.93	5,405
276	Goshainganj	60.49	Abhay Singh	SP	122,235	58.45	Indra Pratap urf Khabbu	BSP	63,554	30.39	58,681
Ambedkar Nagar District
277	Katehari	60.96	Shankh Lal Manjhi	SP	94,641	46.82	Lal Ji Verma	BSP	77,021	38.1	17,620
278	Tanda	64.11	Azimulhaque Pahlwan	SP	83,249	47.3	Ajay Kumar Alias Vishal	BSP	55,728	31.66	27,521
279	Alapur	58.28	Bheem Prasad Sonkar	SP	79,846	48.15	Tribhuvan Dutt	BSP	49,823	30.04	30,023
280	Jalalpur	61.70	Sher Bahadur	SP	89,267	41.93	Ritesh Pandey	BSP	72,003	33.82	17,264
281	Akbarpur	66.11	Ram Murti Verma	SP	91,126	51.31	Sanjay Kumar	BSP	64,840	36.51	26,286
Bahraich District
282	Balha	60.97	Savitri Bai Fule	BJP	58,823	33.19	Kiran Bharti	BSP	38,895	21.95	19,928
283	Nanpara	58.78	Madhuri Verma	INC	46,987	28.54	Waris Ali	BSP	42,665	25.91	4,322
284	Matera	60.06	Yasar Shah	SP	41,944	26.18	Ali Akbar	INC	39,143	24.43	2,801
285	Mahasi	61.86	Krishna Kumar Ojha	BSP	40,546	25.04	Sureshwar Singh	BJP	38,057	23.5	2,489
286	Bahraich	56.21	Dr. Waqar Ahmad Shah	SP	50,759	29.51	Chandra Shekhar Singh	INC	35,263	20.5	15,496
287	Payagpur	61.62	Mukesh Srivastva Alias	INC	65,176	34.82	Ajit Pratap Singh	BSP	38,130	20.37	27,046
288	Kaiserganj	57.72	Mukut Bihari	BJP	45,262	24.26	Ram Tej Yadav Advocate	SP	38,294	20.52	6,968
Shrawasti District
289	Bhinga	64.50	Indrani Devi	SP	65,365	31.72	Muhammad Aslam	INC	58,538	28.41	6,827
290	Shrawasti	58.45	Muhammad Ramjan	SP	67,551	34.29	Vinod Tripathi	BSP	56,346	28.61	11,205
Balrampur District
291	Tulsipur	51.96	Abdul Mashhood Khan	SP	67,105	39.35	Salman Zaheer	BSP	33,395	19.58	33,710
292	Gainsari	56.15	Dr. Shiv Pratap Yadav	SP	56,744	33.75	Alauddin	BSP	33,044	19.65	23,700
293	Utraula	46.95	Arif Anwar Hashmi	SP	40,447	24.04	Dhirendra Pratap Singh	BSP	39,442	23.44	1,005
294	Balrampur	45.64	Jagram Paswan	SP	47,120	28.97	Ramapati Shastri	BJP	28,858	17.74	18,262
Gonda District
295	Mehnaun	56.15	Nandita Shukla	SP	71,667	40.05	Arshad Ali Khan	BSP	38,623	21.58	33,044
296	Gonda	56.06	Vinod Kumar urf Pandit	SP	62,058	37.2	Mahesh Narayan Tiwari	BJP	47,203	28.3	14,855
297	Katra Bazar	60.95	Bawan Singh	BJP	65,355	33.32	Masood Alam	BSP	58,408	29.78	6,947
298	Colonelganj	55.18	Yogesh Pratap Singh	SP	67,723	43.37	Ajay Pratap Singh Alias	BSP	56,002	35.86	11,721
299	Tarabganj	57.64	Awadhesh Kumar Singh	SP	52,395	28.16	Ram Bhajan Chaube	BSP	47,215	25.37	5,180
300	Mankapur	54.10	Babulal	SP	78,311	50.17	Ramesh Chandra	BSP	51,141	32.77	27,170
301	Gaura	56.13	Kunwar Anand Singh	SP	42,773	26.1	Abdul Kalam Malik	INC	35,678	21.77	7,095
Siddharthnagar District
302	Shohratgarh	53.80	Lalmunni Singh	SP	50,935	31.0	Mumtaj Ahmad	BSP	33,423	20.34	17,512
303	Kapilvastu	49.56	Vijay Kumar	SP	78,344	41.19	Sri Ram Chauhan	BJP	41,474	21.81	36,870
304	Bansi	52.16	Jai Pratap Singh	BJP	47,323	28.1	Lal Ji	SP	44,429	26.38	2,894
305	Itwa	52.12	Mata Prasad Pandey	SP	46,142	31.36	Subodh Chandra	BSP	34,408	23.38	11,734
306	Doomariyaganj	51.49	Kamal Yusuf Malik	PECP	44,428	25.14	Saiyada Khatun	BSP	42,839	24.24	1,589
Basti District
307	Harraiya	59.00	Rajkishor Singh	SP	84,409	43.33	Mamata Pandey	BSP	64,123	32.91	20,286
308	Kaptanganj	59.66	Ram Prasad Chaudhary	BSP	67,416	36.05	Trayambak Nath	SP	56,346	30.13	11,070
309	Rudhauli	56.97	Sanjay Pratap Jaiswal	INC	55,950	27.55	Rajendra Prasad	BSP	50,107	24.67	5,843
310	Basti Sadar	58.29	Jeetendra Kumar	BSP	53,011	29.25	Abhishek Pal	INC	34,008	18.76	19,003
311	Mahadewa	56.84	Ram Karan Arya	SP	83,202	45.84	Doodhram	BSP	63,943	35.23	19,259
Sant Kabir Nagar District
312	Menhdawal	51.56	Laxmikant	SP	56,107	27.04	Anil Kumar	PECP	40,030	19.29	16,077
313	Khalilabad	54.20	Dr. Moh. Ayub	PECP	55,841	27.0	Mashhoor Alam	BSP	50,449	24.39	5,392
314	Dhanghata	55.30	Alagu Prasad Chauhan	SP	66,337	35.55	Ram Sidhare	BSP	51,388	27.54	14,949
Maharajganj District
315	Pharenda	59.98	Bajrang Bahadur Singh	BJP	47,921	26.28	Virendra Chaudhary	INC	34,586	18.97	13,335
316	Nautanwa	61.56	Kaushal Kishor	INC	76,584	40.56	Aman Mani Tripathi	SP	68,747	36.41	7,837
317	Siswa	63.00	Shivendra Singh Alias	SP	54,591	25.12	Dr. Ramapati Ram Tripathi	BJP	37,749	17.37	16,842
318	Maharajganj	61.27	Sudama	SP	84,581	39.11	Nirmesh Mangal	BSP	48,426	22.39	36,155
319	Paniyara	58.33	Deo Narayan urf G.m.	BSP	56,114	26.56	Gyanendra	BJP	52,031	24.63	4,083
Gorakhpur District
320	Caimpiyarganj	58.33	Fateh Bahadur	NCP	71,906	36.63	Chinta Yadav	SP	62,948	32.07	8,958
321	Pipraich	59.72	Rajmati	SP	86,976	43.5	Jitendra	BSP	51,341	25.68	35,635
322	Gorakhpur Urban	46.19	Dr Radha Mohan Das	BJP	81,148	49.19	Raj Kumari Devi	SP	33,694	20.42	47,454
323	Gorakhpur Rural	55.18	Vijay Bahadur Yadava	BJP	58,849	31.31	Jafar Amin Dakku	SP	41,864	22.27	16,985
324	Sahajanwa	56.10	Rajendra	BSP	52,949	29.42	Aswani	BJP	40,258	22.37	12,691
325	Khajani	50.75	Sant Prasad	BJP	57,920	35.09	Ram Samujh	BSP	48,484	29.37	9,436
326	Chauri-Chaura	53.56	Jay Prakash	BSP	49,687	29.28	Anoop Kumar Pandey	SP	29,086	17.14	20,601
327	Bansgaon	45.84	Dr. Vijay Kumar	BSP	53,690	35.64	Sharda Devi	SP	45,344	30.1	8,346
328	Chillupar	49.98	Rajesh Tripathi	BSP	61,639	30.81	C.p Chand	SP	50,486	25.23	11,153
Kushinagar District
329	Khadda	60.68	Vijay Kumar Dubey	INC	37,260	21.94	N.p. Kushwaha	SP	35,115	20.68	2,145
330	Padrauna	58.20	Swami Prasad Maurya	BSP	42,184	22.4	Rajesh Kumar Jaiswal	INC	34,022	18.07	8,162
331	Tamkuhi Raj	56.42	Ajay Kumar 'lalloo'	INC	53,121	27.03	Nand Kishor Mishra	BJP	47,261	24.05	5,860
332	Fazilnagar	54.98	Ganga	BJP	49,995	26.74	Kalamuddin	BSP	44,501	23.8	5,494
333	Kushinagar	55.24	Bramhashankar Tripathi	SP	66,489	37.13	Jawed Iqbal	BSP	42,801	23.9	23,688
334	Hata	56.81	Radheshyam	SP	55,591	30.02	Virendra	BSP	38,923	21.02	16,668
335	Ramkola	54.45	Purnmasi Dehati	SP	50,861	30.19	Deep Lal Bharti	BJP	32,295	19.17	18,566
Deoria District
336	Rudrapur	51.73	Akhilesh Pratap Singh	INC	40,783	26.36	Mukti Nath Yadav	SP	33,356	21.56	7,427
337	Deoria	51.00	Janmejai Singh	BJP	56,299	33.88	Pramod Singh	BSP	33,004	19.86	23,295
338	Pathardeva	55.59	Shakir Ali	SP	59,905	32.98	Surya Pratap Shahi	BJP	55,351	30.47	4,554
339	Rampur Karkhana	52.73	Choudhari Fasiha Bashir	SP	51,834	29.17	Girijesh Shahi Alias	IND	44,687	25.15	7,147
340	Bhatpar Rani	52.03	Kameshwar	SP	56,017	35.57	Sabhakunwar	BSP	41,093	26.09	14,924
341	Salempur	45.93	Manbodh	SP	47,884	33.79	Vijaylaxmi	BJP	31,726	22.39	16,158
342	Barhaj	53.87	Prem Prakash Singh	SP	65,672	42.41	Renu Jaiswal	BSP	53,896	34.81	11,776
Azamgarh District
343	Atrauliya	57.60	Dr.sangram Yadav	SP	97,486	52.3	Surendra Prasad Mishra	BSP	53,866	28.9	43,620
344	Gopalpur	54.14	Waseem Ahmad	SP	77,697	47.66	Kamla Prasad Yadav	BSP	47,563	29.17	30,134
345	Sagri	53.15	Abhay Narayan	SP	56,114	35.97	Santosh Kumar	BSP	46,863	30.04	9,251
346	Mubarakpur	58.65	Shah Alam Urfa Guddu	BSP	50,128	29.25	Akhilesh Yadav	SP	41,562	24.25	8,566
347	Azamgarh	54.41	Durga Prasad Yadav	SP	93,629	50.42	Sarvesh Singh Sipu	BSP	62,188	33.49	31,441
348	Nizamabad	52.15	Alambadi	SP	63,894	42.24	Kalamuddin Khan	BSP	40,051	26.48	23,843
349	Phoolpur Pawai	56.81	Shyam Bahadur Singh	SP	47,172	28.91	Abul Kais Azami	BSP	46,307	28.38	865
350	Didarganj	54.61	Adil Sheikh	SP	64,361	36.56	Sukhdev Rajbhar	BSP	62,134	35.3	2,227
351	Lalganj	50.20	Bechai	SP	64,746	36.27	Hira Lal Gautam	BSP	53,734	30.1	11,012
352	Mehnagar	50.29	Brij Lal Sonkar	SP	60,341	33.6	Vidya Chaudhary	BSP	49,979	27.83	10,362
Mau District
353	Madhuban	54.27	Umesh Pandey	BSP	51,572	27.88	Rajendra Mishra	SP	50,216	27.14	1,356
354	Ghosi	56.57	Sudhakar	SP	73,688	35.48	Fagu Chauhan	BSP	58,144	28.0	15,544
355	Muhammadabad- Gohna	54.86	Baijnath	SP	52,691	28.91	Rajendra	BSP	49,552	27.19	3,139
356	Mau	58.25	Mukhtar Ansari	QED	70,210	31.24	Bheem Rajbhar	BSP	64,306	28.61	5,904
Ballia District
357	Belthara Road	54.67	Gorakh Paswan	SP	57,363	33.56	Chhathu Ram	BSP	47,066	27.53	10,297
358	Rasara	58.97	Umashankar	BSP	84,436	46.82	Sanatan	SP	31,611	17.53	52,825
359	Sikanderpur	54.95	Jiauddin Rijvi	SP	58,266	36.72	Chandrabhushan	BSP	29,735	18.74	28,531
360	Phephana	55.53	Upendra Tiwari	BJP	51,151	30.14	Ambika Choudhary	SP	43,764	25.78	7,387
361	Ballia Nagar	48.65	Narad Rai	SP	58,875	34.74	Sathi Ramji Gupta	QED	33,747	19.91	25,128
362	Bansdih	53.80	Ram Govind	SP	52,085	26.94	Ketakee	BJP	29,208	15.11	22,877
363	Bairia	44.32	Jai Prakash Anchal	SP	46,092	32.13	Bharat	BJP	45,534	31.74	558
Jaunpur District
364	Badlapur	55.49	Om Prakash 'baba' Dubey	SP	65,278	37.04	Lalji Yadav	BSP	49,085	27.85	16,193
365	Shahganj	58.18	Shailendra Yadav 'lalaee'	SP	74,486	38.1	Dharmraj Nishad	BSP	64,263	32.87	10,223
366	Jaunpur	54.92	Nadeem Javed	INC	50,863	25.46	Tejbahadur Maurya	BSP	49,624	24.84	1,239
367	Malhani	57.99	Paras Nath Yadaw	SP	81,602	42.17	Dr.jagriti Singh	IND	50,100	25.89	31,502
368	Mungra Badshahpur	55.75	Seema	BJP	50,065	26.83	Ramesh	BSP	44,004	23.58	6,061
369	Machhlishahr	52.43	Jagdish Sonkar	SP	82,484	44.06	Rampher Gautam	BSP	58,059	31.01	24,425
370	Mariyahu	54.64	Shraddha Yadav	SP	55,745	33.61	Savitri Patel	BSP	43,268	26.08	12,477
371	Zafrabad	54.54	Sachindra Nath Tripathi	SP	59,419	30.66	Jagdish Narayan	BSP	54,002	27.87	5,417
372	Kerakat	51.38	Gulab Chand	SP	67,470	32.36	Vijay Lakshami	BSP	57,284	27.47	10,186
Ghazipur District
373	Jakhanian	54.67	Subba Ram	SP	72,561	35.83	Vijay Kumar	BSP	57,331	28.31	15,230
374	Saidpur	56.79	Subhash	SP	90,624	48.6	America	BSP	48,655	26.09	41,969
375	Ghazipur	61.59	Vijay Kumar Mishra	SP	49,561	26.41	Raj Kumar	BSP	49,320	26.28	241
376	Jangipur	59.68	Kailash	SP	72,208	38.87	Manish Chandra Pandey	BSP	62,744	33.77	9,464
377	Zahoorabad	58.62	Syeda Shadab Fatima	SP	67,012	33.02	Kalicharan	BSP	56,534	27.86	10,478
378	Mohammadabad	55.51	Sibgatulla Ansari	QED	66,922	32.7	Rajesh Rai	SP	59,589	29.12	7,333
379	Zamania	54.96	Omprakash	SP	83,407	41.52	Umashanker Kushwaha	BSP	53,967	26.86	29,440
Chandauli District
380	Mughalsarai	59.19	Babban	BSP	59,083	31.54	Babulal	SP	43,643	23.3	15,440
381	Sakaldiha	62.60	Sushil Singh	IND	66,509	36.01	Prabhunarayan Yadav	SP	59,661	32.31	6,848
382	Saiyadraja	58.89	Manoj Kumar	IND	51,499	29.23	Brijesh Singh urf Arun	PMSP	49,483	28.08	2,016
383	Chakia	62.47	Poonam	SP	91,285	43.73	Jitendra Kumar	BSP	82,603	39.57	8,682
Varanasi District
384	Pindra	56.39	Ajay	INC	52,863	29.31	Jai Prakash	BSP	43,645	24.2	9,218
385	Ajagara	60.05	Tribhuvan Ram	BSP	60,239	32.35	Lalji	SP	58,156	31.23	2,083
386	Shivpur	62.95	Uday Lal Maurya	BSP	48,716	26.45	Dr.piyush Yadav	SP	36,084	19.59	12,632
387	Rohaniya	60.35	Anupriya Patel	AD	57,812	30.22	Ramakant Singh	BSP	40,229	21.03	17,583
388	Varanasi North	52.24	Ravindra Jaiswal	BJP	47,980	26.49	Sujit Kumar Maurya	BSP	45,644	25.2	2,336
389	Varanasi South	55.49	Shyamdev Roy Chaudhari	BJP	57,868	38.22	Dr. Dayashankar Mishra	INC	44,046	29.09	13,822
390	Varanasi Cantt.	51.70	Jyotsana Srivastava	BJP	57,918	32.05	Anil Srivastwa	INC	45,066	24.94	12,852
391	Sevapuri	62.29	Surendra Singh Patel	SP	56,849	31.87	Neel Ratan Patel 'neelu'	AD	36,942	20.71	19,907
Bhadohi District
392	Bhadohi	54.83	Jahid Beg	SP	78,698	37.7	Ravindranath Tripathi	BSP	62,457	29.92	16,241
393	Gyanpur	55.23	Vijay Kumar	SP	91,604	51.68	Dinesh Kumar Singh	BSP	53,930	30.42	37,674
394	Aurai	53.71	Madhubala	SP	83,827	47.28	Baijnath	BSP	61,954	34.94	21,873
Mirzapur District
395	Chhanbey	59.44	Bhai Lal Kol	SP	57,488	30.99	Shashi Bhushan	BSP	47,194	25.44	10,294
396	Mirzapur	56.48	Kailash Nath Chaurasiya	SP	69,099	36.51	Rang Nath Mishra	BSP	46,800	24.73	22,299
397	Majhawan	63.18	Ramesh Chand	BSP	83,870	39.72	Rajendra Prasad	SP	74,141	35.11	9,729
398	Chunar	61.30	Jagatamba Singh	SP	67,265	36.36	Ghanshyam	BSP	46,557	25.16	20,708
399	Marihan	67.10	Laliteshpati Tripathi	INC	63,492	29.66	Satyendra Kumar Patel	SP	54,969	25.68	8,523
Sonbhadra District
400	Ghorawal	63.92	Ramesh Chandra	SP	87,708	42.97	Anil Kumar Maurya	BSP	72,521	35.53	15,187
401	Robertsganj	61.30	Avinash	SP	47,139	28.59	Ramesh Singh	BSP	41,798	25.35	5,341
Sonbhadra District
402	Obra (ST)	50.52	Sunil Kumar	BSP	31,513	21.90	Devendra Prasad Shastri	BJP	24,453	16.99	7,060
403	Duddhi	58.43	Rubi Prasad	IND	42,028	26.40	Naresh Kumar	SP	35,989	22.61	6,039

== Bypolls (2012-2017) ==
S.No	Date	Constituency	MLA before election	Party before election	Elected MLA	Party after election
82	12 June 2012	Mant	Jayant Chaudhary	Rashtriya Lok Dal	Shyam Sunder Sharma	All India Trinamool Congress
340	23 February 2013	Bhatpar Rani	Kameswar Upadhyay	Samajwadi Party	Ashutosh Upadhyay	Samajwadi Party
258	2 June 2013	Handia	Mahesh Narayan Singh	Samajwadi Party	Prashant Singh	Samajwadi Party
3	13 September 2014	Saharanpur Nagar	Raghav Lakhanpal	Bharatiya Janata Party	Rajiv Gumber	Bharatiya Janata Party
61	13 September 2014	Noida	Mahesh Sharma	Bharatiya Janata Party	Vimla Batham	Bharatiya Janata Party
173	13 September 2014	Lucknow East	Kalraj Mishra	Bharatiya Janata Party	Ashutosh Tandon	Bharatiya Janata Party
22	13 September 2014	Bijnor	Kunwar Bhartendra Singh	Bharatiya Janata Party	Ruchi Veera	Samajwadi Party
26	13 September 2014	Thakurdwara	Kunwar Sarvesh Kumar Singh	Bharatiya Janata Party	Nawab Jan	Samajwadi Party
138	13 September 2014	Nighasan	Ajay Kumar Mishra	Bharatiya Janata Party	Krishna Gopal Patel	Samajwadi Party
228	13 September 2014	Hamirpur	Sadhvi Niranjan Jyoti	Bharatiya Janata Party	Shiv Charan Prajapati	Samajwadi Party
231	13 September 2014	Charkhari	Uma Bharti	Bharatiya Janata Party	Kaptan Singh	Samajwadi Party
251	13 September 2014	Sirathu	Keshav Prasad Maurya	Bharatiya Janata Party	Wachaspati	Samajwadi Party
282	13 September 2014	Balha	Savitri Bai Phule	Bharatiya Janata Party	Banshidhar Baudh	Samajwadi Party
387	13 September 2014	Rohaniya	Anupriya Singh Patel	Apna Dal	Mahendra Singh Patel	Samajwadi Party
8	15 October 2014	Kairana	Hukum Singh	Bharatiya Janata Party	Nahid Hasan	Samajwadi Party
231	11 April 2015	Charkhari	Kaptan Singh	Samajwadi Party	Urmila Rajput	Samajwadi Party
315	30 April 2015	Pharenda	Bajrang Bahadur Singh	Bharatiya Janata Party	Vinod Tiwari	Samajwadi Party
5	13 February 2016	Deoband	Rajendra Singh Rana	Samajwadi Party	Mavia Ali	Indian National Congress
14	13 February 2016	Muzaffarnagar	Chitranjan Swaroop	Samajwadi Party	Kapil Dev Aggarwal	Bharatiya Janata Party
274	13 February 2016	Bikapur	Mitrasen Yadav	Samajwadi Party	Anand Sen	Samajwadi Party
30	16 May 2016	Bilari	Mohd. Irfan	Samajwadi Party	Mohd. Faeem	Samajwadi Party
376	16 May 2016	Jangipur	Kailash	Samajwadi Party	Kismatiya	Samajwadi Party

== See also ==
- Elections in Uttar Pradesh
- 2017 Uttar Pradesh Legislative Assembly election
- 2022 Uttar Pradesh Legislative Assembly election
- List Uttar Pradesh Legislative Assembly elections
