= Jangipur, Uttar Pradesh Assembly constituency =

Constituency of the Uttar Pradesh legislative assembly in India

Coordinates: 25.65°N 83.56°E

Jangipur
- Constituency No. 376 for the Uttar Pradesh Legislative Assembly

Constituency details
- Country: India
- Region: North India
- State: Uttar Pradesh
- District: Ghazipur
- Reservation: None

Member of Legislative Assembly
- 18th Uttar Pradesh Legislative Assembly
- Incumbent Virendra Kumar Yadav
- Party: Samajwadi Party
- Elected year: 2022

Jangipur is a constituency of the Uttar Pradesh Legislative Assembly covering the city of Jangipur in the Ghazipur district of Uttar Pradesh, India.

Jangipur is one of five assembly constituencies in the Ghazipur Lok Sabha constituency. Since 2008, this assembly constituency is numbered 376 amongst 403 constituencies.

== Members of the Legislative Assembly ==
| Year | Member | Party |
|---|---|---|
Till 2012 : Constituency did not exist
| 2012 | Kailash Yadav | Samajwadi Party |
| 2017 | Virendra Kumar Yadav | Samajwadi Party |
| 2022 | Virendra Kumar Yadav | Samajwadi Party |

== Election results ==
=== 2027 ===
2027 Uttar Pradesh Legislative Assembly election: Jangipur
| Party | Candidate | Votes | % | ±% |
|---|---|---|---|---|
| INDIA | | | | |
| NDA | | | | |
| BSP | | | | |
| NOTA | None of the above | | | |
| Majority | | | | |
| Turnout | | | | |
| gain from | | Swing | | |

=== 2022 ===
2022 Uttar Pradesh Legislative Assembly election: Jangipur
| Party | Candidate | Votes | % | ±% |
|---|---|---|---|---|
| SP | Virendra Kumar Yadav | 103,125 | 44.75 | +11.46 |
| BJP | Ramnaresh Kushwah | 68,062 | 29.53 | −2.25 |
| BSP | Mukesh | 47,857 | 20.77 | −10.55 |
| Jan Adhikar Party | Yogendra | 2,598 | 1.13 | |
| CPI | Ram Badan Singh | 2,136 | 0.93 | −0.18 |
| NOTA | None of the above | 1,169 | 0.51 | −0.01 |
| Majority | | 35,063 | 15.22 | +13.71 |
| Turnout | | 230,465 | 61.16 | −0.77 |
| SP hold | | Swing | | |

=== 2017 ===
Samajwadi Party candidate Virendra Kumar Yadav won in 2017 Uttar Pradesh Legislative Elections defeating Bharatiya Janta Party candidate Ramesh Narayan Kushwaha by a margin of 3,239 votes.

2017 Uttar Pradesh Legislative Assembly Election: Jangipu
| Party | Candidate | Votes | % | ±% |
|---|---|---|---|---|
| SP | Virendra Kumar Yadav | 71,441 | 33.29 | |
| BJP | Ram Naresh Kushwaha | 68,202 | 31.78 | |
| BSP | Manish Chandra Pandey | 67,223 | 31.32 | |
| CPI | Manoj Kumar Singh | 2,381 | 1.11 | |
| NOTA | None of the above | 1,109 | 0.52 | |
| Majority | | 3,239 | 1.51 | |
| Turnout | | 214,622 | 61.93 | |
