= Saharanpur Nagar Assembly constituency =

Vidhan Sabha constituency in Uttar Pradesh, India

Saharanpur Nagar
- Constituency No. 3 for the Uttar Pradesh Legislative Assembly

Constituency details
- Country: India
- Region: North India
- State: Uttar Pradesh
- District: Saharanpur
- Total electors: 349,364 (2012)
- Reservation: None

Member of Legislative Assembly
- 18th Uttar Pradesh Legislative Assembly
- Incumbent Rajiv Gumber
- Party: BJP
- Elected year: 2022

Saharanpur Nagar Assembly constituency is one of the 403 constituencies of the Uttar Pradesh Legislative Assembly, India. It is a part of the Saharanpur district and one of the five assembly constituencies in the Saharanpur Lok Sabha constituency. First assembly election in this assembly constituency was conducted in 2012 after the constituency came into existence in the year 2008 as a result of the "Delimitation of Parliamentary and Assembly Constituencies Order, 2008". VVPAT facility with EVMs will be here in 2017 Uttar Pradesh Legislative Assembly election.

== Wards / Areas ==
Extent of Saharanpur Nagar Assembly is Saharanpur Nagar Palika in Saharanpur district.

== Members of the Legislative Assembly ==
Year	Name	Party
Till 2012 : Constituency did not exist
2012	Raghav Lakhanpal	Bharatiya Janata Party
2014^	Rajiv Gumber	Bharatiya Janata Party
2017	Sanjay Garg	Samajwadi Party
2022	Rajiv Gumber	Bharatiya Janata Party

== Election results ==
=== 2027 ===
2027 Uttar Pradesh Legislative Assembly election: Saharanpur Nagar
Party	Candidate	Votes	%	±%
NDA				
INDIA				
BSP	Naresh Kumar Saini			
NOTA	None of the above			
Majority				
Turnout				
gain from		Swing		

=== 2022 ===
2022 Uttar Pradesh Legislative Assembly election: Saharanpur Nagar
Party	Candidate	Votes	%	±%
BJP	Rajiv Gumber	143,195	48.85	+3.87
SP	Sanjay Garg	135,761	46.32	−0.36
BSP	Manish Arora	8,776	2.99	−3.38
NOTA	None of the above	753	0.26	+0.01
Majority		7,434	2.53	+0.83
Turnout		293,112	66.08	−3.16
BJP gain from SP		Swing		

=== 2017 ===
2017 Uttar Pradesh Legislative Assembly election: Saharanpur Nagar
Party	Candidate	Votes	%	±%
SP	Sanjay Garg	127,210	46.68	
BJP	Rajiv Gumber	122,574	44.98	
BSP	Mukesh Dixit	17,350	6.37	
NOTA	None of the above	675	0.25	
Majority		4,636	1.7	
Turnout		272,509	69.24	
SP gain from BJP		Swing	-2.19	

=== 2014 ===
By-Election, 2014: Saharanpur Nagar
Party	Candidate	Votes	%	±%
BJP	Rajiv Gumber	1,08,306	48.87	+10.07
SP	Sanjay Garg	81,639	36.84	+27.84
INC	Mukesh Kumar	28,553	12.88	−20.17
BMP	Intakab Ahamad	603	0.27	+0.27
ASP	Bablu	384	0.17	+0.17
NOTA	None of the Above	911	0.41	+0.41
Majority		26,667	12.03	+6.28
Turnout		2,21,580	56.99	−5.84
BJP hold		Swing	+10.07	

=== 2012 ===
2012 Uttar Pradesh Legislative Assembly election: Saharanpur Nagar
Party	Candidate	Votes	%	±%
BJP	Raghav Lakhanpal	85,170	38.80	
INC	Saleem Ahmed	72,544	33.05	
BSP	Sanjay Garg	36,140	16.47	
SP	Mazahir Hasan	19,755	9.00	
Majority		12,626	5.75	
Turnout		2,19,492	62.83	
BJP win (new seat)				

== See also ==
- Saharanpur district
- Saharanpur Lok Sabha constituency
- Government of Uttar Pradesh
- List of Vidhan Sabha constituencies of Uttar Pradesh
- Uttar Pradesh
- Uttar Pradesh Legislative Assembly
