= Zainul Basher =

Indian politician

Member of Parliament, Lok Sabha
- In office 1980–1989
- Preceded by: Gauri Shankar Rai
- Succeeded by: Jagdish Kushwaha
- Constituency: Ghazipur

Personal details
- Born: 1 January 1938 Maupara, Saidpur Taluk, Ghazipur district, United Provinces, British India(present-day Uttar Pradesh, India)
- Party: Indian National Congress
- Spouse: Sanjida Begum
- Children: 2 Sons and 2 daughters

Zainul Basher is an Indian politician. He was elected to the Lok Sabha, the lower house of the Parliament of India, as a member of the Indian National Congress.
