= Zamania Assembly constituency =

Constituency of the Uttar Pradesh legislative assembly in India

Coordinates: 25.42°N 83.56°E

Zamania
- Constituency No. 379 for the Uttar Pradesh Legislative Assembly

Constituency details
- Country: India
- Region: North India
- State: Uttar Pradesh
- District: Ghazipur
- Total electors: 3,87,810 (2014)
- Reservation: None

Member of Legislative Assembly
- 18th Uttar Pradesh Legislative Assembly
- Incumbent Omprakash Singh
- Party: Samajwadi Party
- Elected year: 2022

Zamania is a constituency of the Uttar Pradesh Legislative Assembly covering the city of Zamania in the Ghazipur district of Uttar Pradesh, India.

== History ==
Zamania is one of five assembly constituencies in the Ghazipur Lok Sabha constituency. Since 2008, this assembly constituency is numbered 379 amongst 403 constituencies. Before the separation of Uttrakhand from Uttar Pradesh, Zamania was numbered 232, amongst 425 constituencies.

== Members of the Legislative Assembly ==
| Year | Member | Party |
|---|---|---|
| 1957 | Vashishta Narain Sharma | Indian National Congress |
| 1962 | Vashishta Narain Sharma | Indian National Congress |
| 1967 | Ram Sunder Shastri | Communist Party of India |
| 1969 | Vashishta Narain Sharma | Indian National Congress |
| 1974 | Dharam Ram | Bharatiya Kranti Dal |
| 1977 | Dharam Ram | Janata Party |
| 1980 | Saheb Singh | Indian National Congress (I) |
| 1985 | Lalta Prasad Nishad | Indian National Congress |
| 1989 | Ravinder Kumar Singh | Independent |
| 1991 | Sharda Chauhan | Bharatiya Janata Party |
| 1993 | Jai Ram Kushwaha | Bahujan Samaj Party |
| 1996 | Kailash Yadav | Samajwadi Party |
| 2002 | Kailash Yadav | Samajwadi Party |
| 2007 | Raj Kumar Singh Gautam | Bahujan Samaj Party |
| 2012 | Omprakash Singh | Samajwadi Party |
| 2017 | Sunita Singh | Bharatiya Janata Party |
| 2022 | Omprakash Singh | Samajwadi Party |

== Election results ==
=== 2027 ===
2027 Uttar Pradesh Legislative Assembly election: Zamania
| Party | Candidate | Votes | % | ±% |
|---|---|---|---|---|
| INDIA | | | | |
| NDA | | | | |
| BSP | | | | |
| NOTA | None of the above | | | |
| Majority | | | | |
| Turnout | | | | |
| gain from | | Swing | | |

=== 2022 ===
2022 Uttar Pradesh Legislative Assembly election: Zamania
| Party | Candidate | Votes | % | ±% |
|---|---|---|---|---|
| SP | Om Prakash Singh | 94,695 | 40.57 | +17.76 |
| BJP | Sunita Singh | 72,239 | 30.95 | −4.41 |
| BSP | Mohammad Yusuf Farid Khan | 53,303 | 22.84 | −8.26 |
| Jan Adhikar Party | Sahatu | 5,258 | 2.25 | −0.58 |
| NOTA | None of the above | 1,675 | 0.72 | −0.14 |
| Majority | | 22,456 | 9.62 | +5.36 |
| Turnout | | 233,390 | 54.79 | −0.19 |
| SP gain from BJP | | Swing | | |

=== 2017 ===
2017 Uttar Pradesh Legislative Assembly Election: Zamania
| Party | Candidate | Votes | % | ±% |
|---|---|---|---|---|
| BJP | Sunita | 76,823 | 35.36 | |
| BSP | Atul Kumar | 67,559 | 31.1 | |
| SP | Om Prakash | 49,557 | 22.81 | |
| Independent | Kartar Singh Yadav | 12,206 | 5.62 | |
| Jan Adhikar Party | Tauqeer Khan | 6,139 | 2.83 | |
| NOTA | None of the above | 1,857 | 0.86 | |
| Majority | | 9,264 | 4.26 | |
| Turnout | | 217,230 | 54.98 | |

== Previous years ==
Raj Kumar Singh Gautam served as MLA for Zamania from 2007 to 2012, Om Praksh Singh served as MLA for Zamania from 2012 to 2017 and again from 2022.

Bharatiya Janta Party candidate Sunita Singh won in 2017 Uttar Pradesh Legislative Elections by defeating Bahujan Samaj Party candidate Atul Rai by a margin of 9,264 votes. This was only the 2nd victory for BJP since the party's formation, the 1st came in 28 years earlier when Sharda Chauhan won with only 24,402 votes polled for BJP in 1991 & defeated Ravindra Yadav of Janata Dal by a margin of 2,357 votes to establish BJP's presence in the critical Assembly constituency. 1991 also was the first time when a female candidate contested Zamania constituency and Chauhan was amongst the 10 female winners in a 425-member house.

To highlight the importance of victory in critical Zamania constituency, Kalyan Singh had awarded state planning and transport ministries with independent charge to Smt Chauhan in Kalyan Singh ministry. Samajwadi Party continued the tradition by awarding cabinet berths to Kailash (won in 1996 by defeating Sharda Chauhan by a margin of 6,987 votes, 2002) & Omprakash Singh (won in 2012) in Mulayam Singh & Akhilesh Yadav governments.
