= Saidpur Assembly constituency =

Constituency of the Uttar Pradesh legislative assembly in India

Coordinates: 25.55°N 83.18°E

Saidpur
- Constituency No. 374 for the Uttar Pradesh Legislative Assembly

Constituency details
- Country: India
- Region: North India
- State: Uttar Pradesh
- District: Ghazipur
- Total electors: 4,00,659
- Reservation: SC

Member of Legislative Assembly
- 18th Uttar Pradesh Legislative Assembly
- Incumbent Ankit Bharti
- Party: Samajwadi Party
- Elected year: 2022

Saidpur is a constituency of the Uttar Pradesh Legislative Assembly covering the city of Saidpur in the Ghazipur district of Uttar Pradesh, India.

Saidpur is one of five assembly constituencies in the Ghazipur Lok Sabha constituency. Since 2008, this assembly constituency is numbered 374 amongst 403 constituencies.

== Members of the Legislative Assembly ==
Year	Member	Party
1952	Kamla Singh	Independent
1952	Dev Ram	Indian National Congress
1957	Atma Ram Pandey	Indian National Congress
1962	Kamla Singh Yadav	Praja Socialist Party
1967	Atma Ram Pandey	Indian National Congress
1969	Ram Karan	Bharatiya Kranti Dal
1974	Prabhu Narain	Indian National Congress
1977	Udai Narain	Janata Party
1980	Ram Karan	Janata Party (Secular)
1985	Ranjit	Lokdal
1989	Ranjit	Janata Dal
1991	Mahendra Nath Pandey	Bharatiya Janata Party
1993	Sri Lal Ji	Bahujan Samaj Party
1996	Mahendra Nath Pandey	Bharatiya Janata Party
2002	Kailash Nath Yadav	Bahujan Samaj Party
2004^	Rajnath Yadav	Samajwadi Party
2007	Dinanath Pandey	Bahujan Samaj Party
2012	Subhash Pasi	Samajwadi Party
2017	Subhash Pasi	Samajwadi Party
2022	Ankit Bharti	Samajwadi Party

== Election results ==
=== 2027 ===
2027 Uttar Pradesh Legislative Assembly election: Saidpur
Party	Candidate	Votes	%	±%
INDIA				
NDA				
BSP				
NOTA	None of the above			
Majority				
Turnout				
gain from		Swing		

=== 2022 ===
2022 Uttar Pradesh Legislative Assembly election: Saidpur
Party	Candidate	Votes	%	±%
SP	Ankit Bharti	109,711	46.36	+10.4
BJP	Subhash Pasi	73,076	30.88	−1.0
BSP	Binod Kumar	45,097	19.06	−8.96
NOTA	None of the above	1,898	0.8	−0.05
Majority		36,635	15.48	+11.4
Turnout		236,636	59.06	−0.79
SP hold		Swing		

=== 2017 ===
Samajwadi Party candidate Subhash Pasi won in 2017 Uttar Pradesh Legislative Elections defeating Bharatiya Janta Party candidate Vidyasagar Sonkar by a margin of 8,710 votes.

2017 Uttar Pradesh Legislative Assembly Election: Saidpu
Party	Candidate	Votes	%	±%
SP	Subhash Passi	76,664	35.96	
BJP	Vidyasagar Sonkar	67,954	31.88	
BSP	Rajiv Kiran	59,726	28.02	
NISHAD	Santosh	2,451	1.15	
Mahakranti Dal	Sanjay	2,118	0.99	
NOTA	None of the above	1,787	0.85	
Majority		8,710	4.08	
Turnout		213,188	59.85	
