= Sanjay Garg =

Indian politician

MLA in 17th Legislative Assembly of Uttar Pradesh
- In office March 2017 – March 2022
- Preceded by: Rajiv Gumber
- Succeeded by: Rajiv Gumber
- Constituency: Saharanpur Nagar

MLA in 14th Legislative Assembly of Uttar Pradesh
- In office February 2002 – May 2007
- Preceded by: Self
- Succeeded by: Raghav Lakhanpal
- Constituency: Saharanpur

MLA in 13th Legislative Assembly of Uttar Pradesh
- In office October 1996 – February 2002
- Preceded by: Lal Krishan Gandhi
- Succeeded by: Self
- Constituency: Saharanpur

Personal details
- Born: Saharanpur district
- Party: Bhartiya Janta Party (2024 - Present)
- Other political affiliations: Samajwadi Party (1996-2002), (2007- 2024) Janata Party (2002- 2007)
- Spouse: Punam Garg (wife)
- Children: Punya Garg and Soumya garg
- Parent: Lt. Manmohan Nath Garg
- Education: J.V. JAIN COLLEGE SAHARANPUR
- Profession: Politician

Former Minister Of UP Govt. Sanjay Garg is an Indian politician. He belongs to the Bhartiya Janta Party. He is a member of Seventeenth Legislative Assembly of Uttar Pradesh representing the Saharanpur Nagar assembly constituency. Garg is 59 years old (2017) and a graduate. He is seasoned politician who has been active in politics for over 4 decades now. He has successfully made himself recognized by everyone as a simple, dedicated, non-corrupt and futuristic leader, which makes him one of the few most eligible people's representatives in the State.

== Political career ==
Sanjay Garg has been Former Minister Of Uttar Pradesh and MLA. He represented the Saharanpur Nagar constituency in 2017 and he is a member of the Samajwadi Party. In Seventeenth Legislative Assembly of Uttar Pradesh he defeated Bhartiya Janata Party candidate Rajiv Gumber by a margin of 4,636 votes.

== Posts held ==
#	From	To	Position	Party
01	1996	2002	Member, 13th Legislative Assembly	Samajwadi Party
03	2002	2007	Member, 14th Legislative Assembly	Janata Party
03	2017	2022	Member, 17th Legislative Assembly	Samajwadi Party
