= Vishwanath Shastri =

Indian politician

Member of Parliament, Lok Sabha
- In office 1991–1996
- Preceded by: Jagdish Kushwaha
- Succeeded by: Manoj Sinha
- Constituency: Ghazipur

Personal details
- Born: 2 July 1945 Asown,Ghazipur district, United Provinces, British India(present-day Uttar Pradesh, India)
- Died: 18 March 2019 Lucknow
- Party: Communist Party of India
- Spouse: Durgawati Devi
- Children: One son and two daughters

Vishwanath Shastri was an Indian politician. He was elected to the Lok Sabha (1991–1996), the lower house of the Parliament of India, as a member of the Communist Party of India.
