= V. S. Gahmari =

Indian politician

Vishwanath Singh Gahmari was an Indian politician and a leader of the Indian National Congress political party. He was a member of the 3rd Lok Sabha representing Ghazipur constituency in Uttar Pradesh state from 1962 to 1967. In 1962, he raised the issue of poverty and backwardness of the Purvanchal region of Uttar Pradesh state in the Indian Parliament which resulted in the constitution of the Patel Commission by the Union government to find out the facts.
