= Har Prasad Singh =

Indian politician

Member of Parliament, Lok Sabha
- In office 1952–1962
- Succeeded by: V. S. Gahmari
- Constituency: Ghazipur

Personal details
- Born: 1 December 1900 Parsani,,Ghazipur district, United Provinces, British India(present-day Uttar Pradesh, India)
- Party: Indian National Congress
- Spouse: Kesari Devi

Har Prasad Singh was an Indian politician. He was elected to the Lok Sabha, the lower house of the Parliament of India, as a member of the Indian National Congress.
