= Jagdish Singh Kushwaha =

Indian politician

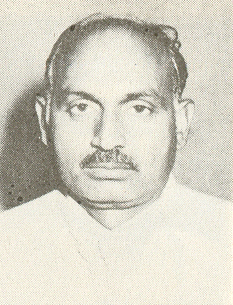

Member of Parliament, Lok Sabha
- In office 1989–1991
- Preceded by: Zainul Basher
- Succeeded by: Vishwanath Shastri
- Constituency: Ghazipur

Personal details
- Born: 7 July 1946 (age 80)
- Party: Independent
- Spouse: Vasanti Devi

Jagdish Singh Kushwaha is an Indian politician. He was elected to the Lok Sabha the lower house of the Parliament of India from Ghazipur as an independent.
