= Sarjoo Pandey =

Indian independence activist and politician

Sarjoo Pandey (Hindi: सरजू पाण्डे) (19 November 1919 – 25 August 1989) was an Indian politician, Indian independence activist and a leader of the Communist Party of India, who was born in Urha and died in Moscow.

== Life ==
Pandey was born in Urha (small village in Kasimabad) on 19 November 1919 in the family of a Brahmin farmer Mahaveer Pandey. He was in the 8th standard when he joined the Indian independence movement. He was ordered to be shot on sight for his activities against the British rule.. A number of sections of the Indian Penal Code were leveled against him. He was the only independence activist from Ghazipur who accepted the charges in the court and sought punishment from the court.

Pandey was a member of the 2nd, 3rd, 4th and 5th Lok Sabha. He was elected to the 2nd and 3rd Lok Sabha from Rasra constituency in 1957 and 1962 and to the 4th and 5th Lok Sabha from Ghazipur constituency in 1967 and 1971. When he was elected to the Lok Sabha, Jawaharlal Nehru in the Parliament presented him a rose, which he then carried in his coat.

== Position held ==
- Vice-President, All India Kisan Sabha
- General Secretary, All India Cane Growers' Association
- Member, National Council of Communist Party of India
- Deputy Leader,Communist Party of India group in Lok Sabha
- Second Lok Sabha, 1957–62
- Third Lok Sabha, 1962–67
- Fourth Lok Sabha, 1967–70
