= Sunita (politician) =

Indian politician

MLA, 17th Legislative Assembly
- In office 2017–2022
- Constituency: Zamania, Ghazipur Uttar Pradesh

Personal details
- Party: Bharatiya Janata Party
- Occupation: MLA
- Profession: Politician

Sunita Singh is a Member of the Legislative Assembly from Zamania seat in Ghazipur district of Uttar Pradesh. She contested the Uttar Pradesh assembly elections held in 2017 with BJP ticket and defeated her close contestant Atul Rai by 9264 votes.

== Early life ==
Singh was born in Chatra district of Jharkhand. She completed her graduation from Banaras Hindu University in 1986.

She is married to Parikshit Singh.

== Posts held ==
| # | From | To | Position | Comments |
|---|---|---|---|---|
| 01 | 2017 | 2022 | Member, 17th Legislative Assembly | |

== See also ==
- Uttar Pradesh Legislative Assembly
