= Ankit Bharti =

Indian politician

Member of the 18th Uttar Pradesh Assembly
- Incumbent
- Assumed office March 2022
- Preceded by: Subhash Pasi
- Constituency: Saidpur

Personal details
- Born: 26 June 1996 (age 30) Ghaziabad, India
- Party: Samajwadi Party
- Spouse: Ambika Bharti (m. 2025)
- Parent: Om Prakash Bharti (father)
- Education: Bachelor of Business Administration
- Alma mater: IEC University
- Occupation: Politician

Ankit Bharti is an Indian politician and a member of the 18th Uttar Pradesh Assembly from the Saidpur Assembly constituency. He is a member of the Samajwadi Party.

Ankit Bharti was born on 26 June 1996 in Ghaziabad district to Om Prakash Bharti. He got engaged on 1 February 2025 and married Ambika Bharti on 16 October 2025..

== Early life ==
Bharti was born on 26 June 1996 in Ghaziabad, Uttar Pradesh, to a JatavHindu family of Om Prakash Bharti.

== Education ==
Bharti graduated with a Bachelor of Business Administration from IEC University, Himachal Pradesh.

== Posts held ==
#	From	To	Position	Comments
01	May 2021 - March 2022		Ghazipur District Council Member	
02	2022	Incumbent	Member, 18th Uttar Pradesh Assembly	
