= Raj Kumar Singh Gautam =

Indian politician

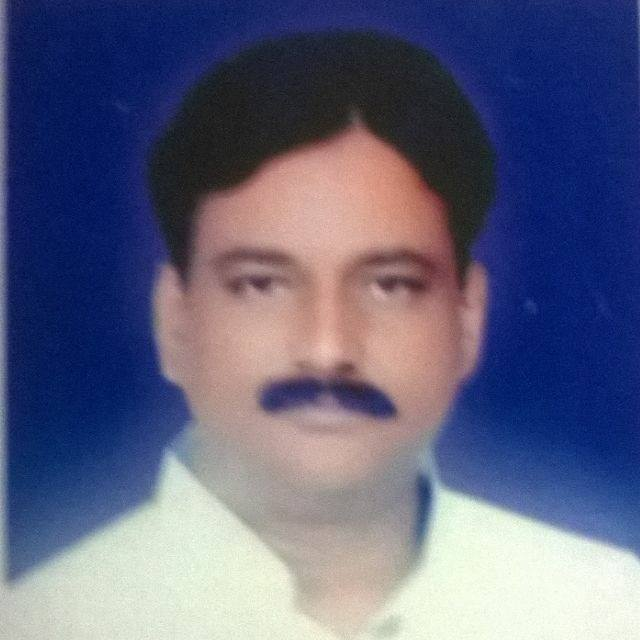
- Constituency: Uttar Pradesh

Personal details
- Born: 15 August 1966 (age 59) Ghazipur
- Party: Bhartiya Janta Party
- Education: Udai Pratap College in Varanasi; Purvanchal University
- Occupation: Politician and businessman

Raj Kumar Singh Gautam (born 18 August 1966) is an Indian politician and businessman. He is the founder and CMD (Chairman and Managing Director) of Gautam Group. He served as MLA (2007-2012) from Zamania constituency of Ghazipur, Uttar Pradesh.

== Early life ==
Raj Kumar Singh Gautam was born in Mainpur village, Karanda tehsil Ghazipur, Uttar Pradesh, India in 1966 in Hindu Rajput family to Shri Ranvijay Singh and Shrimati Radhika Devi. He belongs to Kshatriya caste which is dominant in Zamania Karanda belt. He studied at Udai Pratap College in Varanasi, Uttar Pradesh and finally completed his PhD in horticulture from Purvanchal University in 1993. He started his business in Varanasi in 1994.
