= Jangipur, Ghazipur =

Coordinates: 25.5500°N 83.1800°E

Jangipur Zangipur
- Town
- Nickname: The City of Imams
- Interactive map of Jangipur
- Country: India
- State: Uttar Pradesh
- District: Ghazipur

Area
  - Total: 4.11 km^{2} (1.59 sq mi)

Population (2011)
  - Total: 12,223
  - Density: 2,970/km^{2} (7,700/sq mi)

Languages
  - Official: Hindi
- Time zone: UTC+5:30 (IST)
- PIN: 233305
- Website: http://ghazipur.nic.in/

Jangipur or Zangipur also known as “The City of Imams” is a town and a nagar panchayat in Ghazipur district in the Indian state of Uttar Pradesh.

== Demographics ==
As of 2001 India census, Jangipur had a population of 11,100. Males constitute 52% of the population and females 48%. Jangipur has an average literacy rate of 58%, lower than the national average of 59.5%: male literacy is 67%, and female literacy is 47%. In Jangipur, 19% of the population is under 6 years of age.
