= Virendra Kumar Yadav =

Indian politician based in Uttar Pradesh

MLA, 17th Legislative Assembly
- Incumbent
- Assumed office Mar 2017
- Constituency: Jangipur

Personal details
- Born: 18 October 1976 (age 49) Ghazipur
- Party: Samajwadi Party
- Spouse: Vibha Yadav
- Children: Four (1 son & 3 daughters)
- Parent(s): Kailash Yadav, former Cabinet Minister of Uttar Pradesh Government
- Education: University of Allahabad; Awadhesh Pratap Singh University
- Profession: Politician

Virendra Kumar Yadav is an Indian politician and a member of the 17th Legislative Assembly of Uttar Pradesh ( U.P. ) of India. He represents the Jangipur Assembly constituency in Ghazipur district of Uttar Pradesh and is a member of the Samajwadi Party.

== Early life and education ==
Virendra Kumar Yadav was born on 18 October 1976 in Jaitapur mohalla of Ghazipur town and his father was late Kailash Yadav who was a prominent politician of Ghazipur. He got his early education at Ghazipur. But he got enrolled in University of Allahabad for higher studies, where he got his BA, MA and LLB degrees. Virendra Kumar Yadav got his Ph.D. from Awadhesh Pratap Singh University, Rewa. His father late Kailash Yadav was a senior leader of Samajwadi Party and a Cabinet Minister in Akhilesh Yadav government in Uttar Pradesh.

== Political career ==
Virendra Kumar Yadav got active in politics just after completing his studies. Due to his political background he got early success in politics. He was elected Block Pramukh of Ghazipur Sadar in the year 2005. He got elected as Chairman of Zila Panchayat of Ghazipur in 2016. However, he got major success only after being elected as MLA from Jangipur assembly seat in 2017. He defeated his close contestant Ramesh Narayan Kushwaha from Bharatiya Janata Party with a margin of 3,239 votes.

== Posts held ==
Before being elected as Member of Legislative assembly of Uttar Pradesh Virendra Kumar Yadav has held various political posts in Ghazipur district.

- Block Pramukh, Ghazipur Sadar, 2005-2012
- Chairman, Zila Panchayat, Ghazipur, 2016-2017
- District Secretary, Samajwadi Party, Ghazipur

#	From	To	Position	Comments
01	2017	Incumbent	Member, 17th Legislative Assembly	

== See also ==
- Uttar Pradesh Legislative Assembly
