= Rajiv Gumber =

Indian politician

Rajiv Gumber राजीव गुम्बर

Member of the Uttar Pradesh Legislative Assembly
- Incumbent
- Assumed office 10 March 2022
- Preceded by: Sanjay Garg
- Constituency: Saharanpur Nagar
- In office October 2014 – March 2017
- Preceded by: Raghav Lakhanpal
- Succeeded by: Sanjay Garg

Personal details
- Born: 1 September 1970 (age 55) Saharanpur district, Uttar Pradesh
- Party: Bharatiya Janata Party
- Profession: Politician

Rajiv Gumber is an Indian politician and a member of the Eighteenth Legislative Assembly of Uttar Pradesh. He was also member of Sixteenth Legislative Assembly of Uttar Pradesh. Gumber represented the Saharanpur Nagar constituency of Uttar Pradesh and is a member of the Bharatiya Janata Party political party.

== Early life and education ==
Rajiv Gumber was born in Saharanpur district, Uttar Pradesh, India in 1970. Gumber's highest attained education is intermediate. Before entering politics, he was a businessperson.

== Political career ==
Gumber won the Saharanpur Nagar (Assembly constituency) election in 2022. He was an MLA for one term from 2014 to 2017. He represents the Bharatiya Janata Party. He was elected during the by-election held on 13 September 2014 after the sitting MLA Raghav Lakhanpal resigned in May 2014 after getting elected to 16th Lok Sabha.

== Posts held ==
#	From	To	Position	Comments
01	2014	2017	Member, 16th Legislative Assembly	
02	2022	Incumbent	Member, 18th Legislative Assembly	Bharatiya Janata Party

== See also ==
- Uttar Pradesh Legislative Assembly
