= Saudan Singh =

Indian politician

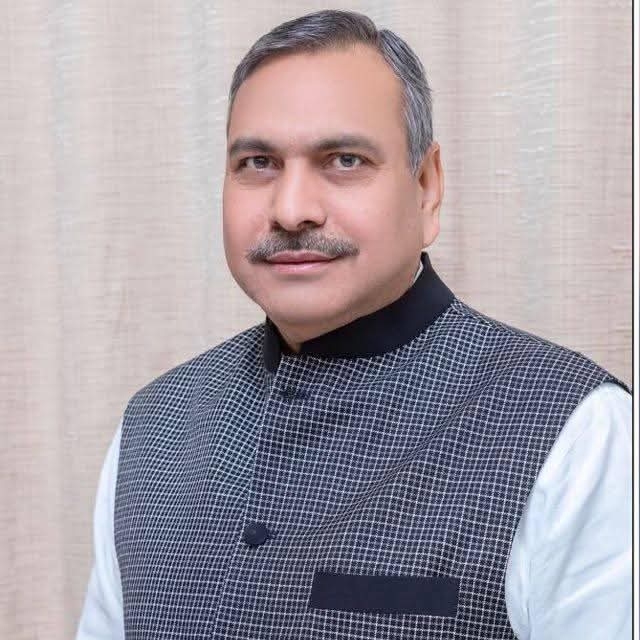

National Joint General Secretary of Bharatiya Janata Party
- Incumbent
- Assumed office 2021

Personal details
- Born: May 10, 1961 (age 65) Kagpur, Vidisha, Madhya Pradesh, India
- Party: Bharatiya Janata Party
- Other political affiliations: Rashtriya Swayamsevak Sangh
- Education: M.A. in Political Science
- Occupation: Politician

Saudan Singh (born 10 May 1961) is an Indian politician and a senior leader of the Bharatiya Janata Party (BJP). He has held several organizational roles in both the BJP and its ideological parent, the Rashtriya Swayamsevak Sangh (RSS). As of 2021, he serves as the National Vice President of the BJP.

== Early life and education ==
Saudan Singh was born in the village of Kagpur in Vidisha district, Madhya Pradesh, India. He holds a Master of Arts degree in Political Science.

== Political career ==
Singh began his political career through the RSS, where he served in several pracharak (campaigner) roles across Madhya Pradesh:

- 1980–1982: Nagar Pracharak, Bhopal
- 1982–1984: Tehsil Pracharak, Huzur and Berasia
- 1984–1986: Zila Pracharak, Bhopal
- 1986–1989: Zila Pracharak, Raisen
- 1989–1992: Zila Pracharak, Vidisha

He joined the BJP's organizational structure in the 1990s:

- 1993–1995: Sangathan Mantri for Betul, Hoshangabad, Harda, and Bhopal
- 1995–2001: Sambhag Sangathan Mantri for various districts in Madhya Pradesh
- 2001–2004: State General Secretary (Organization), Chhattisgarh
- 2004–2007: Zonal General Secretary (Organization) for Chhattisgarh, Andhra Pradesh, and Telangana
- 2007–2020: Joint National General Secretary (Organization) for northern and eastern Indian states including Uttar Pradesh, Bihar, Jharkhand, and Rajasthan
- 2021–present: National Vice President of the BJP, with responsibility over Haryana, Punjab, Chandigarh, and Himachal Pradesh

In August 2022, he was appointed as the BJP's election in-charge for the Himachal Pradesh Legislative Assembly elections.

== Public statements and activities ==
In April 2023, Singh criticized the Aam Aadmi Party’s governance in Punjab, alleging economic distress and poor healthcare infrastructure under its rule.

He also participated in the "Swachh Teerth" (Clean Pilgrimage) campaign initiated by the BJP in line with Prime Minister Narendra Modi’s cleanliness mission.

== Personal life ==
Saudan Singh resides in Chandigarh. He was born to Anrat Singh (also known as Anurudh Singh) and Radha Bai. He has several siblings, including Randheer Singh, Het Singh, and Jagat Singh.
