= Ranipur Barsi =

Village in Uttar Pradesh, India

Coordinates: 29°54′N 77°13′E

Ranipur Barsi is a village situated in the Nakur Mandal of Saharanpur District in Uttar Pradesh, India. It is about 24.02 km far from the mandal headquarters at Nakur, and is 474 kilometres from the state capital at Lucknow. Most of the population belong to the Jat community.

Villages nearby include Barsi (0 km), Landhaura (2.2 km), Dhola Fatehpur (2.2 km), Tikraul (2.8 km), Manohara (2.9 km), Dadanpur (3.0 km), and Madhopur (3.4 km).
