= Jhabiran =

Village in Uttar Pradesh, India

Jhabiran is a village situated near Sarsawa in the Nakur tehsil of Saharanpur District in Uttar Pradesh, India. It is about 600 kilometres from the state capital Lucknow.

Jhabiran is a mid-sized village with a population of about 7,000 people in around 800 households. It is a predominantly Hindu village, and most of the remainder are Muslim. More than half of the population belongs to the Jat community. Other castes include Faqir, Nai, Kumhar, Teli, Chamar, Valmiki and Brahmin.

National Highway 344 is 1 km north of Jhabiran.
