= Manki, Uttar Pradesh =

Village in Uttar Pradesh, India

Manki is a village situated in the Deoband Mandal of Saharanpur District in the state of Uttar Pradesh. The village is 5 kilometres (3.1 mi) from its Mandal headquarters at Deoband. Manki is known for GADA Biradri or GAUR. It is also famous for ancient Shiv Mandir (Shivalay). Manki is famous for its hospitality. Every year bhole come from different part of country stay there at Shiv Mandir and the go to Haridwar for taking holly bath. Every Monday in srawan month, a festival is organised at Shiv Mandir and people from across the country join this festival.

The village is located at 29°41′55″N 77°43′28″E at an elevation of 257 m (843 ft).

Villages nearby include Talheri Khurd (1.8 km (1.1 mi)), Miragpur (2.3 km (1.4 mi)), Sanpla Bakkal (2.4 km (1.5 mi)), Dugchari Malakpur (2.7 km (1.7 mi)), Bibipur (2.8 km (1.7 mi)), Sadharanapur (3.5 km (2.2 mi)) and Salhapur (3.6 km (2.2 mi)).
