= Pilkhani railway station =

Railway station in Uttar Pradesh

Pilkhani

General information
- Location: Saharanpur, Rajapan, Saharanpur district, Uttar Pradesh; India
- Coordinates: 29°59′51″N 77°28′22″E
- Elevation: 281 m (922 ft)
- System: Passenger train station
- Owner: Indian Railways
- Operator: Northern Railway
- Line: Moradabad–Ambala line
- Platforms: 2
- Tracks: 2

Construction
- Structure type: Standard (on ground station)

Other information
- Status: Active
- Station code: PKY
- Zone(s): Northern Railway zone
- Division(s): Ambala

History
- Opened: 1886

Services
Preceding station	Indian Railways	Following station
Saharanpur Junction towards ?	Northern Railway zone Moradabad–Ambala line	Sarsawa towards ?
Location

Pilkhani railway station is a railway station on Moradabad–Ambala line under the Ambala railway division of Northern Railway zone. This is situated at Saharanpur, Rajapan in Saharanpur district of the Indian state of Uttar Pradesh.
