= Agwanhera =

Settlement in India

Agwanhera is a village in the Saharanpur district of Uttar Pradesh, India. It is located in the Nakur tehsil. The nearest post office is Sarsawa (PIN Code: 247232).

== History ==
This village is founded by Choudhary Ramnivas Panwar in 1772.

== Location ==
It is located on Sarsawa-nakur link road, 4 km from Sarsawa and 10 km from Nakur.

== Details ==
The population is 2580 according to the 2011 census. The village has all the basic facilities such as schools, private clinics, fresh water supply and electricity. The main occupation of this village people is farming.

== Demographics ==
Agwanhera is a large village located in Nakur of Saharanpur district, Uttar Pradesh with total 436 families residing. The Agwanhera village has population of 2554 of which 1340 are males while 1214 are females as per Population Census 2011.

In Agwanhera village population of children with age 0-6 is 403 which makes up 15.78% of total population of village. Average Sex Ratio of Agwanhera village is 906 which is lower than Uttar Pradesh state average of 912. Child Sex Ratio for the Agwanhera as per census is 791, lower than Uttar Pradesh average of 902.

Agwanhera village has higher literacy rate compared to Uttar Pradesh. In 2011, literacy rate of Agwanhera village was 77.59% compared to 67.68% of Uttar Pradesh. In Agwanhera Male literacy stands at 87.80% while female literacy rate was 66.60%.

As per constitution of India and Panchyati Raaj Act, Agwanhera village is administrated by Sarpanch (Head of Village) who is elected representative of village.
