= Raisi railway station =

Railway station in Uttarakhand

Raisi

General information
- Location: Netwala Saidabad, Bhowawali, Laksar, Haridwar district, Uttarakhand; India
- Coordinates: 29°41′34″N 78°03′59″E
- Elevation: 234 m (768 ft)
- System: Passenger train station
- Owner: Indian Railways
- Operator: Northern Railway
- Line: Moradabad–Ambala line
- Platforms: 2
- Tracks: 2

Construction
- Structure type: Standard (on ground station)

Other information
- Status: Active
- Station code: RSI
- Zone(s): Northern Railway zone
- Division(s): Moradabad

History
- Opened: 1886
- Former names: Oudh and Rohilkhand Railway

Services
Preceding station	Indian Railways	Following station
Balawali towards ?	Northern Railway zone Moradabad–Ambala line	Laksar Junction towards ?
Location

Raisi railway station is a railway station on Moradabad–Ambala line under the Moradabad railway division of Northern Railway zone. This is situated at Netwala Saidabad, Bhowawali, Laksar in Haridwar district of the Indian state of Uttarakhand.
