= Dausni railway station =

Railway station in Uttarakhand

Dausni

General information
- Location: Majri Akbarpur, Laksar, Haridwar district, Uttarakhand; India
- Coordinates: 29°47′05″N 77°58′47″E
- Elevation: 244 m (801 ft)
- System: Passenger train station
- Owner: Indian Railways
- Operator: Northern Railway
- Line: Moradabad–Ambala line
- Platforms: 2
- Tracks: 2

Construction
- Structure type: Standard (on ground station)

Other information
- Status: Active
- Station code: DSNI
- Zone(s): Northern Railway zone
- Division(s): Moradabad

History
- Opened: 1886
- Former names: Oudh and Rohilkhand Railway

Services
Preceding station	Indian Railways	Following station
Laksar Junction towards ?	Northern Railway zone Moradabad–Ambala line	Landhaura towards ?
Location

Dausni railway station is a railway station on Moradabad–Ambala line under the Moradabad railway division of Northern Railway zone. This is situated at Majri Akbarpur, Laksar in Haridwar district of the Indian state of Uttarakhand.
