= Saluni =

Village in Uttar Pradesh, India

Saluni is a village in the Saharanpur district of Uttar Pradesh, India. It is located in the Saharanpur tehsil. The nearest post office is Sarsawa (PIN Code: 247232). It comes under Saluni Panchayath and belongs to Saharanpur Division . It is located 14 km towards west from District headquarters Saharanpur. 576 km from State capital Lucknow.

== Location ==
It is situated on Sarsawa-Chilkana road about 4 km from Sarsawa town and 2 km from the Sarsawa Railway Station.

Saharanpur, Jagadhari, Nakur, Yamunanagar are the nearby Cities to Saluni. The place is near border of the Saharanpur-Yamunanagar District. This border is also known as Uttarpradesh-Haryana border.

== Connectivity of Saluni ==
The public/private bus services are available from village for both Sarsawa and Chilkana side.

== Details ==
The total geographical area of village is 197.11 hectares. The village has a population of about 1200. The village has almost all basic facilities like primary school, electricity and good roads. There is also a Govt Water Tank facility in the village which supplies the fresh water for daily uses.

== Population ==
Saluni is a medium size village located in Saharanpur of Saharanpur district, Uttar Pradesh with total 191 families residing. The Saluni village has population of 1108 of which 610 are males while 498 are females as per Population Census 2011.

In Saluni village population of children with age 0-6 is 127 which makes up 11.46% of total population of village. Average Sex Ratio of Saluni village is 816 which is lower than Uttar Pradesh state average of 912. Child Sex Ratio for the Saluni as per census is 841, lower than Uttar Pradesh average of 902.

Saluni village has higher literacy rate compared to Uttar Pradesh. In 2011, literacy rate of Saluni village was 83.38% compared to 67.68% of Uttar Pradesh. In Saluni Male literacy stands at 91.31% while female literacy rate was 73.64%.

As per constitution of India and Panchyati Raaj Act, Saluni village is administrated by Gram Pradhan (Head of Village) who is elected representative of village.
