= Sarsawa railway station =

Railway station in Uttar Pradesh

Sarsawa

General information
- Location: Sarsawa, Saharanpur district, Uttar Pradesh; India
- Coordinates: 30°01′27″N 77°25′26″E
- Elevation: 276 m (906 ft)
- System: Passenger train station
- Owner: Indian Railways
- Operator: Northern Railway
- Line: Moradabad–Ambala line
- Platforms: 2
- Tracks: 2

Construction
- Structure type: Standard (on ground station)

Other information
- Status: Active
- Station code: SSW
- Zone(s): Northern Railway zone
- Division(s): Ambala

History
- Opened: 1886

Services
Preceding station	Indian Railways	Following station
Pilkhani towards ?	Northern Railway zone Moradabad–Ambala line	Kalanour towards ?
Location

Sarsawa railway station is a railway station in India on the Moradabad–Ambala line under the Ambala railway division of the Northern Railway zone. It is situated at Sarsawa in Saharanpur district of the state of Uttar Pradesh.
