= Nangal Soti =

Nagal Soti
- town
- Location in Uttar Pradesh, India Nagal Soti (India)
- Coordinates: 29.6614249°N 78.1886674°E
- Country: India
- State: Uttar Pradesh
- District: Bijnor District
- Elevation: 269 m (883 ft)

Languages
  - Official: Hindi
- Time zone: UTC+5:30 (IST)
- Nearest city: Najibabad

Nagal Soti is a village in India. It is located in the Najibabad block, Bijnor district of the state of Uttar Pradesh. Nagal Soti belongs to the Moradabad division, which is located 34 km north of the district headquarters of Bijnor, 15 km from Najibabad, and 483 km from the state capital of Lucknow.

== Demographics ==
The current population of Nagal Soti is estimated to be 6,576. 47% of the village inhabitants are women and 53% are men. There are 1,124 houses and the most commonly spoken language in the village is Hindi.

== Transport ==
The nearest railway station is located in Chandok and Balawali.

== Education ==
There are several educational institutions in Nagal Soti including:

- S4 International School
- Raja Bharat Singh Inter College
- Saraswati Shishu Mandir, an affiliate of the Vidya Bharati which runs one of the largest private network of schools in India.
- Spring Field Academy
- Lala Amichand Junior High School

== Nearby villages ==
- Khanpur (1 km)
- Jeetpur Khas (3 km)
- Harchandpur (4 km)
- Raipur Khas (4 km)
- Rasoolpur Said (4 km)
- Kanshi Rampur (5 km)
- Shahzadpur Carrie Ville (1 km)
