= Ganjheri =

Village in Uttar Pradesh, India

Ganjheri is a village situated in the Nagal Mandal of Saharanpur District in Uttar Pradesh, India . The village is located about 19.53 km from its Mandal headquarters in Nagal, and is 458 kilometres from the state capital Lucknow.

Villages nearby include Ismailpur Gujjar (2.6 km), Tajpur (2.7 km), Talheri Bujurg (3.3 km), Bachiti (3.5 km), Sarsina (3.7 km), Bhavanpur (3.9 km) and Baseda (4.7 km).
