= Chalakpur =

Village in Uttar Pradesh, India

Coordinates: 30°03′N 77°27′E

Chalakpur is a village in Saharanpur district, Uttar Pradesh. It is 13 km away from Saharanpur 5 km from Sarsawa 3 km from ChilkanasultanPur 13 km from YamunaNagar 67 km From Ambala
