= Tighri =

Village in Uttar Pradesh, India

Tigri is a village situated in the Deoband Mandal of Saharanpur District in the state of Uttar Pradesh. The village is 10.43 kilometres (6.48 mi) from its Mandal headquarters at Deoband.

Villages nearby include Fulasi (1.5 km), Gopali (2.0 km), Rajupur (2.1 km), Fulas Akbarpur (2.2 km), Dudhali (2.3 km), Thitki (2.9 km), and Zahirpur (3.3 km).
