= Fatehpur Jat =

Village in Uttar Pradesh, India

Fatehpur Jat is a village situated in the Ballia Kheri Mandal of Saharanpur District in Uttar Pradesh, India. The village is located 480 km from the state capital Lucknow . It is a midsized village and has a population of about 1,697 persons living in around 284 households. The majority of the population belong to the Jat community.

Villages nearby include Manak Mau (1.5 km), Sawalpur Nawada (1.9 km), Mohammadpur Mafi (2.0 km), Dara Shivpuri (2.1 km), Bani Kheda (2.7 km), Taharpur (3.0 km), and Panjora (3.0 km)
