= Aurangzebpur =

Village in India

Coordinates: 30°03′N 77°30′E

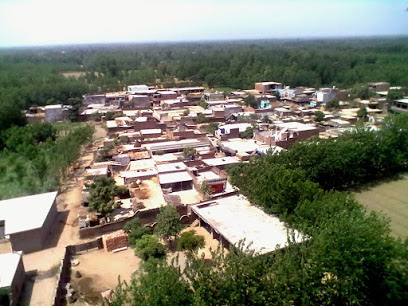
View of Aurangzebpur

Aurangzebpur is a small village in Saharanpur District, Uttar Pradesh, Aurnagzebpur also known by another name Nazeebpur, this village has a small population dominated by Muslims almost 99% population is Muslim, Located on Saharanpur-Chilkana road. Aurangzebpur is not connected to the main road, but has the connectivity through "PM Garamin Sadak Yojna". to the Chilkana Road.

Particulars	Total	Male	Female
Total No. of Houses	172	--	--
Population	1,063	565	498
Child (0–6)	184	97	87
Schedule Caste	20	9	11
Schedule Tribe	0	0	0
Literacy	68.26%	78.21%	56.93%
Total Workers	277	257	20
Main Worker	272	0	0
Marginal Worker	5	4	1
