= FZL =

FZL may refer to:

- FZL, the IATA code for Fuzuli International Airport, Azerbaijan
- FZL, the Indian Railways station code for Fazalpur railway station, Uttar Pradesh, India
