= Landhaura railway station =

Railway station in Uttarakhand

Landhaura

General information
- Location: Landhaura, Haridwar district, Uttarakhand; India
- Coordinates: 29°48′52″N 77°56′30″E
- Elevation: 260 m (850 ft)
- System: Passenger train station
- Owner: Indian Railways
- Operator: Northern Railway
- Line: Moradabad–Ambala line
- Platforms: 2
- Tracks: 2

Construction
- Structure type: Standard (on ground station)

Other information
- Status: Active
- Station code: LDR
- Zone(s): Northern Railway zone
- Division(s): Moradabad

History
- Opened: 1886
- Former names: Oudh and Rohilkhand Railway

Services
Preceding station	Indian Railways	Following station
Dhandera towards ?	Northern Railway zone Moradabad–Ambala line	Dausni towards ?
Location

Landhaura railway station is a railway station on Moradabad–Ambala line under the Moradabad railway division of Northern Railway zone. This is situated at Landhaura in Haridwar district of the Indian state of Uttarakhand.
