= Jhinjholi =

- Village
- Interactive map of Jhinjholi
- Coordinates: 30.1066398°N 77.6590651°E
- Country: India
- State: Uttar Pradesh
- District: Saharanpur

Languages
  - Official: Hindi
- Time zone: UTC+5:30 (IST)
- PIN: 247129
- Nearest city: Saharanpur

Jhinjholi is a village situated in Saharanpur district of Uttar Pradesh state, north India. It is about 22 km from Saharanpur city.

== Educational institutes ==
=== Schools ===
- Primary School Jhinjholi
- Upper Primary School Jhinjholi
