= Soti =

Soti may refer to:

== People ==
- Anaika Soti, Indian actress and model
- Jozef Soti (born 1972), Serbian sprint canoer
- Soti Triantafyllou (born 1957), Greek author
- Thea Soti (born 1989), Serbian musician

== Places ==
- Nangal Soti, India

== Other ==
- Soti incident
- Soti (tribe), ancient Ligurian tribe
