= KNZ =

KNZ or knz can refer to:

- Kalamsé language, Gur language of Burkina Faso and Mali
- Kalanour railway station, in Yamunanagar district, Haryana, India
- Kazik na Żywo, Polish rapcore band
- Kéniéba Airport, near Kéniéba, Mali
- Koninklijke Nederlandse Zoutindustrie, Dutch chemical company
- National Youth Council of Malta
- Kwilanzi Newspaper Zambia
