= Chandok railway station =

Railway station in Uttar Pradesh

Chandok

General information
- Location: Chandouk-Kiratpur Road, Chandouk, Bijnor district, Uttar Pradesh; India
- Coordinates: 29°34′36″N 78°09′10″E
- Elevation: 256 m (840 ft)
- System: Passenger train station
- Owner: Indian Railways
- Operator: Northern Railway
- Line: Moradabad–Ambala line
- Platforms: 2
- Tracks: 2

Construction
- Structure type: Standard (on ground station)

Other information
- Status: Active
- Station code: CNK
- Zone(s): Northern Railway zone
- Division(s): Moradabad

History
- Opened: 1886
- Former names: Oudh and Rohilkhand Railway

Services
Preceding station	Indian Railways	Following station
Muzzampur Narayan towards ?	Northern Railway zone Moradabad–Ambala line	Balawali towards ?
Location

Chandok railway station is a railway station on Moradabad–Ambala line under the Moradabad railway division of Northern Railway zone. This is situated beside Chandouk–Kiratpur Road at Chandouk in Bijnor district of the Indian state of Uttar Pradesh.
