= Masoom Sharma =

Indian singer and actor (born 1991)

- Born: March 27, 1991 (age 35); Brahmanwas, Jind district, Haryana, India
- Occupations: Singer; actor
- Years active: 2009–present
- Musical career
- Genres: Pop; hip hop; pop rap
- Instrument: Vocals
- Labels: Sony Music India; T-Series; Desi Records; Saga Music Haryanvi; Global Music Junction - Haryanvi

Masoom Sharma (born 27 March 1991) is an Indian singer and actor known for his contributions to Haryanvi music and cinema. He gained widespread recognition for his unique style, blending pop, and traditional Haryanvi sounds. Sharma is best known for his hit songs such as "Madam Ji", "Lofar", "Tuition Badmashi Ka", "2 Numbari", "Raat Ke Shikari", and "Chambal K Dakku", among many others.

== Early life and career ==
Sharma was born on 27 March 1991 in Brahmanwas village of Jind district in Haryana, India. He began his music career in the late 2000s and rose to prominence in the Haryanvi music scene with commercially successful releases.

His 2014 track "C" significantly increased his popularity in the regional music circuit. He continued releasing songs through the 2020s, gaining viewership on digital platforms.

== 2026 Sarpanch controversy ==
In February 2026 Sharma was involved in an on-stage altercation during a performance in Jind, Haryana, where a heated exchange took place between him and a former sarpanch.

Following the incident, members of the Haryana Sarpanch Association objected to his remarks and demanded a public apology within three days, warning that his programs could be banned in villages if he failed to comply.

In Jhajjar district local sarpanch groups announced a boycott of his programs following the controversy.

Sharma later clarified that his comments had been misunderstood and stated that he respected village heads.

He also said he was willing to retract his words if they had hurt sentiments.

== Security concerns ==
In 2026 media reports stated that a social media post allegedly linked to the Lawrence Bishnoi gang mentioned Sharma while claiming responsibility for a firing incident in Sonipat.

Authorities reportedly examined the matter following the post.

== Controversy ==
In April, 2026, Masoom Sharma was involved in a public controversy following remarks he made at an event held at DAV PG College in Dehradun. The event was attended by several local figures, including independent MLA Umesh Kumar, and took place shortly after the departure of Uttarakhand Chief Minister Pushkar Singh Dhami.

According to reports, Sharma used language that was described as abusive and derogatory. The remarks prompted reactions from sections of the public, with some residents of Dehradun expressing concern and dissatisfaction.

Subsequently, the Haryana State Commission for Women issued a summons to Sharma in connection with the incident. In addition, an FIR was registered against him at Dalanwala Police Station in Dehradun. Authorities indicated that the matter would be subject to further inquiry in accordance with legal procedures.

== Filmography ==
=== Films ===
Key
†	Denotes films that have not yet been released

==== Haryanvi ====
Year	Title	Role	Notes
2026	Licence	Satta / Anoop	

== Discography ==
=== As lead artist ===
Track	Year	Artist(s)	Music	Lyrics	Label
Kothe Chad Lalkaru	2014	Masoom Sharma, Sheenam Katholic	Ramesh Shahpuria	Lalit Rathi	Saga Music Haryanvi
2 Numbari	2021	Masoom Sharma, Manisha Sharma	Pinna Music	Harry Lather	Mad 4 Music Haryanvi
Jap Naam Bhole Ka	2021	Masoom Sharma, Manisha Sharma	Pinna Music	Manjeet Mor	Bindass Haryanvi
Tuition Badmashi Ka	2022	Masoom Sharma, Manisha Sharma	Aman Jaji	Ajay Dhankhar	Desi Records
GENTLEMAN 2	2023	Masoom Sharma	Pinna Music	Rahul Muana	Global Music Junction - Haryanvi
Yaari	2024	Masoom Sharma	Pinna Music	Amar Karnawal	Kiara Records
GENTLEMAN	2024	Masoom Sharma & Ashu Twinkle	Pinna Music	Amar Karnawal	Global Music Junction - Haryanvi
Teri Ramjhol Bole Gi	2024	Masoom Sharma, Sheenam Katholic, Mr. Boota	Mr. Boota	Mukesh Jaji	Kohram Music India
Lofar	2024	Masoom Sharma, Swara Verma	Pinna Music	Harry Lather	Sky High Music
Warning	2025	Masoom Sharma, Swara Verma	Pinna Music	Rahul Muana	Gem Tunes Haryanvi
Ramayan Ka Saar	2025	Masoom Sharma	Pinna Music	Amar Karnawal	Masoom Sharma
Chambal K Dakku	2025	Masoom Sharma, Swara Verma	Pinna Music	Rahul Muana, Vishal Muana	Bajewala Records Haryanvi
Madam Ji	2025	Masoom Sharma, Rekha Goswami	Pinna Music	Amar Karnawal	Masoom Sharma
Raat Ke Shikari	2025	Masoom Sharma	Pinna Music	Mp Karsola	Sonotek Music
KAND	2025	Masoom Sharma	Pinna Music	Manish Bamla	Global Music Junction - Haryanvi
