= Chakwali, Uttar Pradesh =

Village in Uttar Pradesh, India

Coordinates: 29°46′45″N 77°30′30″E

Chakwali is a village situated in Saharanpur district of Uttar Pradesh state, India. The village is notable for its 'Bharat Sarovar' pond, which is built in the shape of a map of India.
