= Laldhang Assembly constituency =

Former constituency of the Uttarakhand Assembly, in India

Coordinates: 29.85°N 78.32°E

Laldhang
- Former constituency for the Uttarakhand Legislative Assembly

Constituency details
- Country: India
- Region: North India
- State: Uttarakhand
- District: Haridwar
- Established: 2002
- Abolished: 2012

Laldhang Legislative Assembly constituency was one of the seventy electoral Uttarakhand Legislative Assembly constituencies of Uttarakhand state in India. It was abolished in 2012 following the delimitation.

Laldhang Legislative Assembly constituency was a part of Haridwar (Lok Sabha constituency).

== Members of Legislative Assembly ==
Election	Name	Party
2002	Taslim Ahmad	Bahujan Samaj Party
2007	Taslim Ahmad	Bahujan Samaj Party

== Election results ==
=== Assembly Election 2007 ===
2007 Uttarakhand Legislative Assembly election: Laldhang
Party	Candidate	Votes	%	±%
BSP	Taslim Ahmad	19,988	24.04%	▼3.48
BJP	Sanjay Gupta	17,329	20.84%	▼2.11
SP	Mohd Irfan	9,836	11.83%	▼0.52
Independent	Balwant Singh	8,418	10.12%	New
Independent	Shrikant Verma	7,706	9.27%	New
INC	Sanjay Kumar Saini	5,136	6.18%	▼6.66
BJSH	Brij Mohan Pokhariyal	4,178	5.02%	New
NCP	Jag Pal Singh Saini	2,527	3.04%	New
UKD	Bal Singh Saini	1,851	2.23%	▲1.17
Shivsena	Chhavi Ram	1,603	1.93%	▼1.29
Independent	Avneesh Kumar	651	0.78%	New
Margin of victory		2,659	3.20%	▼1.37
Turnout		83,150	68.78%	▲1.73
Registered electors		1,20,905		▲29.56
BSP hold		Swing	▼3.48	

=== Assembly Election 2002 ===
2002 Uttaranchal Legislative Assembly election: Laldhang
Party	Candidate	Votes	%	±%
BSP	Taslim Ahmad	17,218	27.52%	New
BJP	Balwant Singh Chauhan	14,362	22.95%	New
INC	Sahab Singh Saini	8,032	12.84%	New
SP	Ambrish Kumar	7,727	12.35%	New
IUML	Imran Ahamad	2,262	3.62%	New
Independent	Brij Mohan Pokhariyal	2,088	3.34%	New
Shivsena	Mahaveer	2,013	3.22%	New
Independent	Karan Pal	1,922	3.07%	New
RPD	Santosh Kashyap	1,455	2.33%	New
LJP	Niranjan Singh Alias Singh Sahab	1,106	1.77%	New
UKD	Mohammad Isha	658	1.05%	New
Margin of victory		2,856	4.56%	
Turnout		62,566	67.05%	
Registered electors		93,322		
BSP win (new seat)				

== See also ==
- Haridwar Rural (Uttarakhand Assembly constituency)
