= Manjhipur =

Village in Uttar Pradesh, India

- Village
- Location within Uttar Pradesh
- Coordinates: 30.148659°N 77.653795°E
- Country: India
- State: Uttar Pradesh
- District: Saharanpur

Area
  - Total: 297 ha (730 acres)

Population (2011)
  - Total: 3,185
  - Density: 1,070/km^{2} (2,780/sq mi)

Manjhipur is a village in the Saharanpur district of Uttar Pradesh, India. It lies about 600 kilometres (370 mi) north-west of the state's capital, Lucknow.

As of the 2011 Census of India, it had a population of 3,185.
