= Balawali railway station =

Railway station in Uttar Pradesh

Balawali

General information
- Location: Forest Range-1, Balawali, Bijnor district, Uttar Pradesh; India
- Coordinates: 29°37′39″N 78°06′45″E
- Elevation: 244 m (801 ft)
- System: Passenger train station
- Owner: Indian Railways
- Operator: Northern Railway
- Line: Moradabad–Ambala line
- Platforms: 2
- Tracks: 2

Construction
- Structure type: Standard (on ground station)

Other information
- Status: Active
- Station code: BLW
- Zone(s): Northern Railway zone
- Division(s): Moradabad

History
- Opened: 1886
- Former names: Oudh and Rohilkhand Railway

Services
Preceding station	Indian Railways	Following station
Chandok towards ?	Northern Railway zone Moradabad–Ambala line	Raisi towards ?
Location

Balawali railway station is a railway station on Moradabad–Ambala line under the Moradabad railway division of Northern Railway zone. It is situated at Forest Range-1, Balawali in Bijnor district of the Indian state of Uttar Pradesh.
