= Alipura, Uttar Pradesh =

Alipura
- Location in INDIA
- Coordinates: 29.964°N 77.546°E
- Country: India
- Divisions of Uttar Pradesh: Sarsawan
- District: Saharanpur District

Government
  - Type: Panchayat
  - Pradhan: Mohammad Adil (Thekedar)

Population (2011)
  - Total: 4,638
- Time zone: UTC+5:30 (Indian Standard Time)
- Postal code: 247232
- Area code: 247232
- Vehicle registration: UP11
- Website: http://alipura.com/

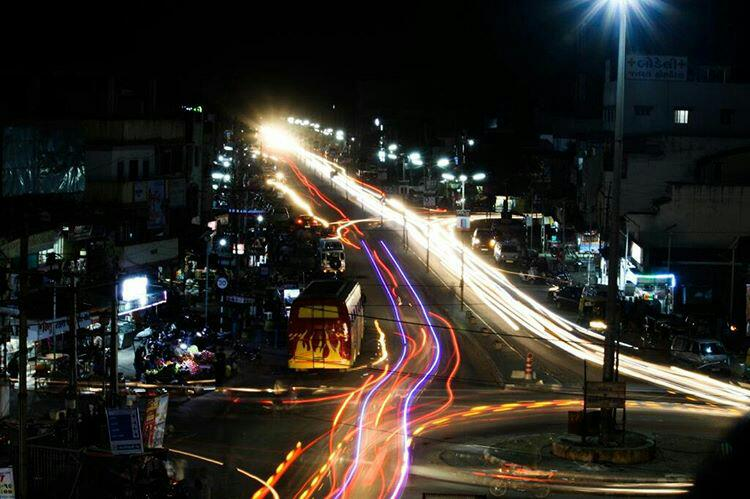
Long exposure shot of Alipura Circle

Alipura (Alipura Kalan) is a village in Saharanpur District in the Meerut Division of western Uttar Pradesh, India. The most common occupation of this village is agriculture. It is in the western part of Saharanpur, and is surrounded by agricultural lands.

== Education ==
- Jai Seva Vidhlaya, Private School
- Junior Primary School, Government of UP
- Senior Primary School, Government of UP
- Mr.Sir Sayyad Academy Madarsa, Private School

== Nearby cities ==
- Saharanpur City - 8 km
- Nakur- 17 km
- Rampur Maniharan- 21 km
- Haibat (Yamuna Nagar)- 24 km

== Nearby districts ==
No.	District	No.	District	No.	District	No.	District
1	Yamunanagar- 26 km	3	Karnal- 62 km	5	Kurukshetra- 65 km	7	Yamunanagar 15 km
2	Dehradun - 70 km	4	Delhi - 165 km	6	Chadigarh	8	

== Nearby taluks ==
No.	Taluks	No.	Taluks
1	Sarsawan- 8 km	3	Saharanpur- 8 km
2	Nakur- 17 km	4	Puwarka- 18 km

== Population (2011) ==
No.	Population	Persons	Male	Female
1	Total	4,638	2,524	2,114
2	In the age group 0–6 years	654	361	293
3	Literates	2,494	1,554	940
4	Total Worker	1,259	1,169	90

== Notable Person ==
- Alam Tanveer
- Alam Khan
- Dr Bikram Sing
- Dr Mangha
- Haji Rana
- Mangal Singh
- Wasif Ahmed
- Muahmmad Ahmad Nawab

== See also ==
Sarsawan
