= Muzzampur Narayan railway station =

Railway station in Uttar Pradesh

Muzzampur Narayan

General information
- Location: Junction Point, Mungerpur, Bijnor district, Uttar Pradesh; India
- Coordinates: 29°34′59″N 78°13′20″E
- Elevation: 257 m (843 ft)
- System: Passenger train station
- Owner: Indian Railways
- Operator: Northern Railway
- Line: Moradabad–Ambala line
- Platforms: 3
- Tracks: 2

Construction
- Structure type: Standard (on ground station)

Other information
- Status: Active
- Station code: MZM
- Zone(s): Northern Railway zone
- Division(s): Moradabad

History
- Opened: 1886
- Former names: Oudh and Rohilkhand Railway

Services
Preceding station	Indian Railways	Following station
Fazalpur towards ?	Northern Railway zone Moradabad–Ambala line	Chandok towards ?
Location

Muzzampur Narayan railway station is a railway station on Moradabad–Ambala line under the Moradabad railway division of Northern Railway zone. This is situated at Junction Point, Mungerpur in Bijnor district of the Indian state of Uttar Pradesh.
