= Dalheri =

- village
- Location in Uttar Pradesh, India. Dalheri (India)
- Country: India
- State: Uttar Pradesh
- District: Saharanpur
- Founder: Rajputs

Government
  - Type: Panchayati raj (India)
  - Body: Gram panchayat

Languages
- Time zone: UTC+5:30 (IST)
- Vehicle registration: UP-11-

Dalheri is a village of Pundir Rajput (Thakur) in Saharanpur district, Uttar Pradesh state, India.

== Demographics ==
Dalheri is a large village with a total of 1763 families residing there. The Dalheri village has a population of 4850, of which 2566 are males and 2284 are females, as per the 2011 Population Census. The average sex ratio of Dalheri village is 890, which is lower than the Uttar Pradesh state average of 912.

Dalheri village has a higher literacy rate compared to Uttar Pradesh. In 2011, the literacy rate of Dalheri village was 73.36%, compared to 67.68% in Uttar Pradesh. In Dalheri, male literacy stands at 81.63%, while female literacy is 64.26%.
