= Siddhpeeth Shri Shakumbhari Devi, Saharanpur =

Hindu temple

Shakumbhari Devi Temple
- Siddhpeeth Shri Shakambhari Devi Temple
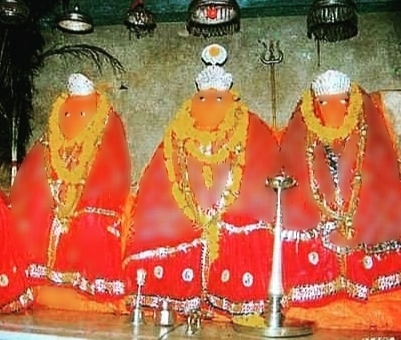

- Location of Siddhpeeth Shri Shakumbhari Devi in Uttar Pradesh

Religion
- Affiliation: Hinduism
- District: Saharanpur
- Deity: Shakambhari
- Festivals: Shakambhari Purnima, Navratri, Diwali

Location
- Location: Uttar Pradesh
- Country: India
- Coordinates: 30.2566°N 77.7425°E

Website
- https://matashakumbharidevi.in/

Shakumbhari Devi Temple, also known as Siddhpeeth Shri Shakumbhari Devi Temple, is a Hindu temple dedicated to Shakumbhari, a form of Parvati associated with nourishment, vegetation and fertility. It is located in the Shivalik Hills near Jasmour village in Behat tehsil, about 40 km north of Saharanpur, Uttar Pradesh, India.

Shakumbhari Devi Temple is an important pilgrimage centre in northern India and receives large numbers of devotees annually. Navratri and Diwali are among the principal festivals observed at the temple.

== Location ==
The temple is located in the Shivalik Hills near Jasmour village in Behat tehsil of Saharanpur district, Uttar Pradesh. The temple is accessible by road from Saharanpur via Behat and is approximately 40–45 km from Saharanpur railway station. Saharanpur Junction is connected by rail to Delhi, Lucknow, Dehradun, Haridwar, Chandigarh and Jammu. The nearest airport is Sarsawa Air Force Station, although commercial air travel is generally served by Dehradun Airport, about 80 km away, and Indira Gandhi International Airport in Delhi, about 200 km away. The temple can also be reached by road from Dehradun, Haridwar, Chandigarh, Delhi and other cities in northern India.

== Legends ==
According to the Devi Bhagavata Purana and the Durga Saptashati, the demon Durgamasura stole the Vedas and defeated the gods, causing a severe famine that lasted for one hundred years. In response to the prayers of the gods, Adi Shakti appeared as Shakumbhari. Tradition holds that tears from her hundred eyes brought rain, while vegetables and other food grew to nourish the world. She is therefore also known as Shatakshi, meaning “the hundred-eyed one”.

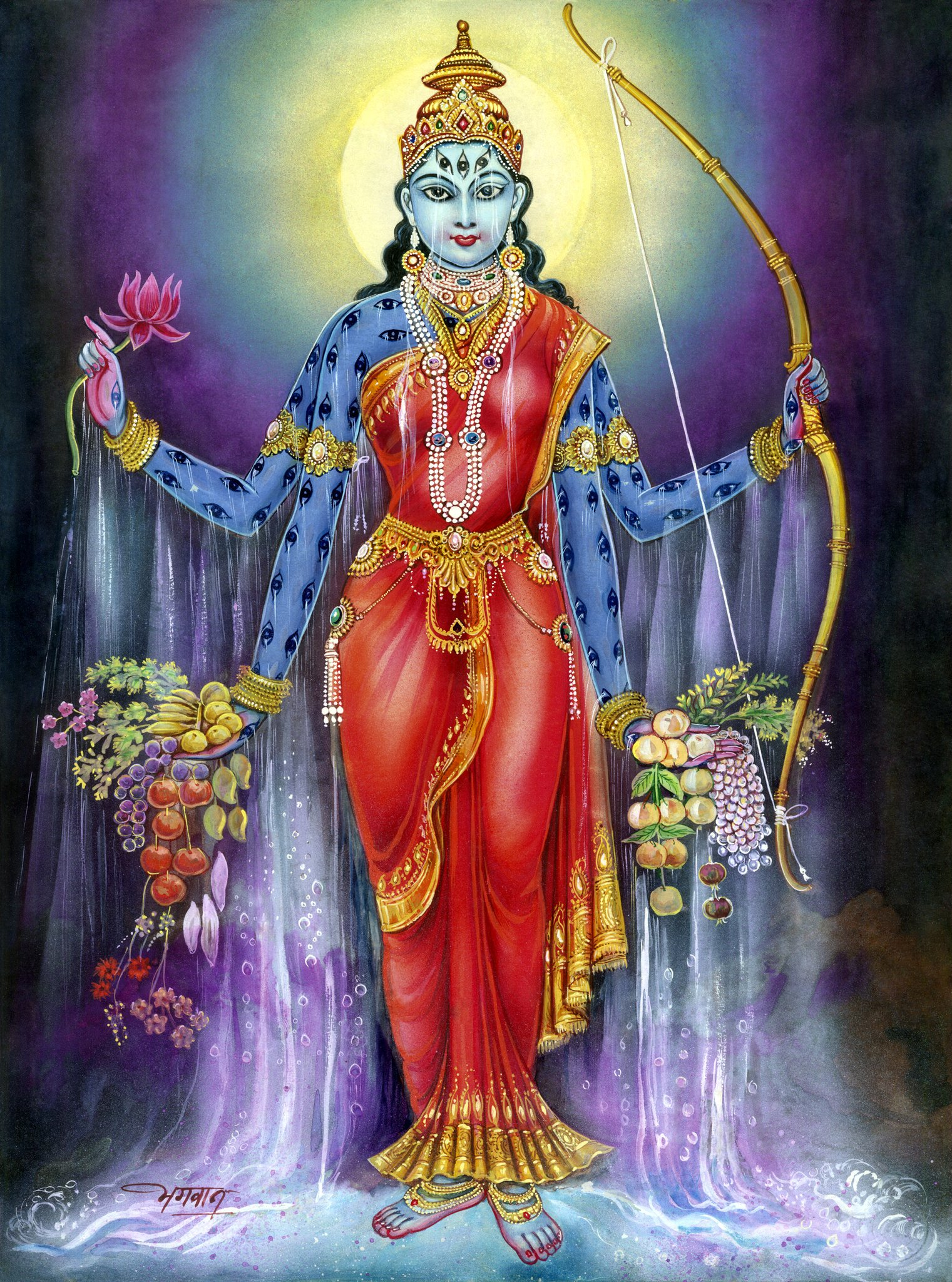
Goddess Shatakshi, with hundred eyes.

The temple's sanctum contains the principal image of Shakumbhari Devi. Images of Bhima Devi and Bhramari Devi are placed to her right, while Shatakshi Devi is placed to her left; an image of Bala Ganesha is situated among them. Bhura Dev Temple, dedicated to Bhairava, is located about one kilometre east of the main temple. Devotees traditionally visit Bhura Dev first as part of the pilgrimage.

== Gallery ==
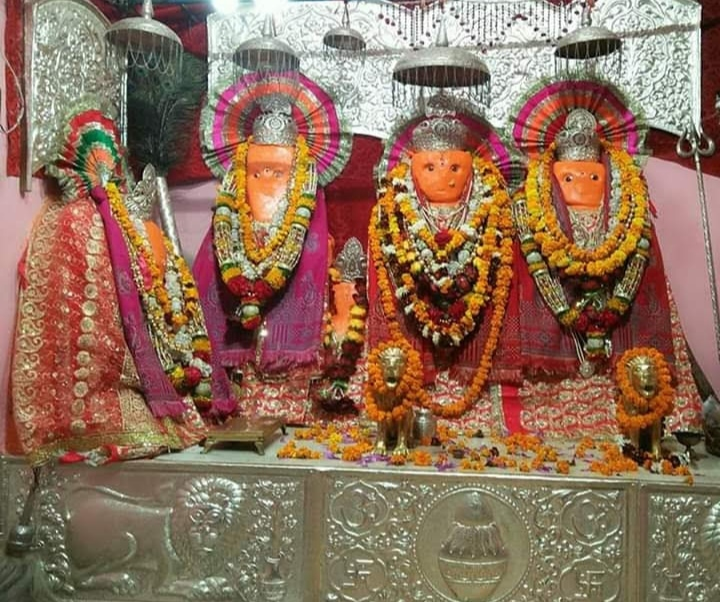
Images in the sanctum: Shakumbhari Devi at the centre, with Bhima Devi and Bhramari Devi to her right and Shatakshi Devi to her left.

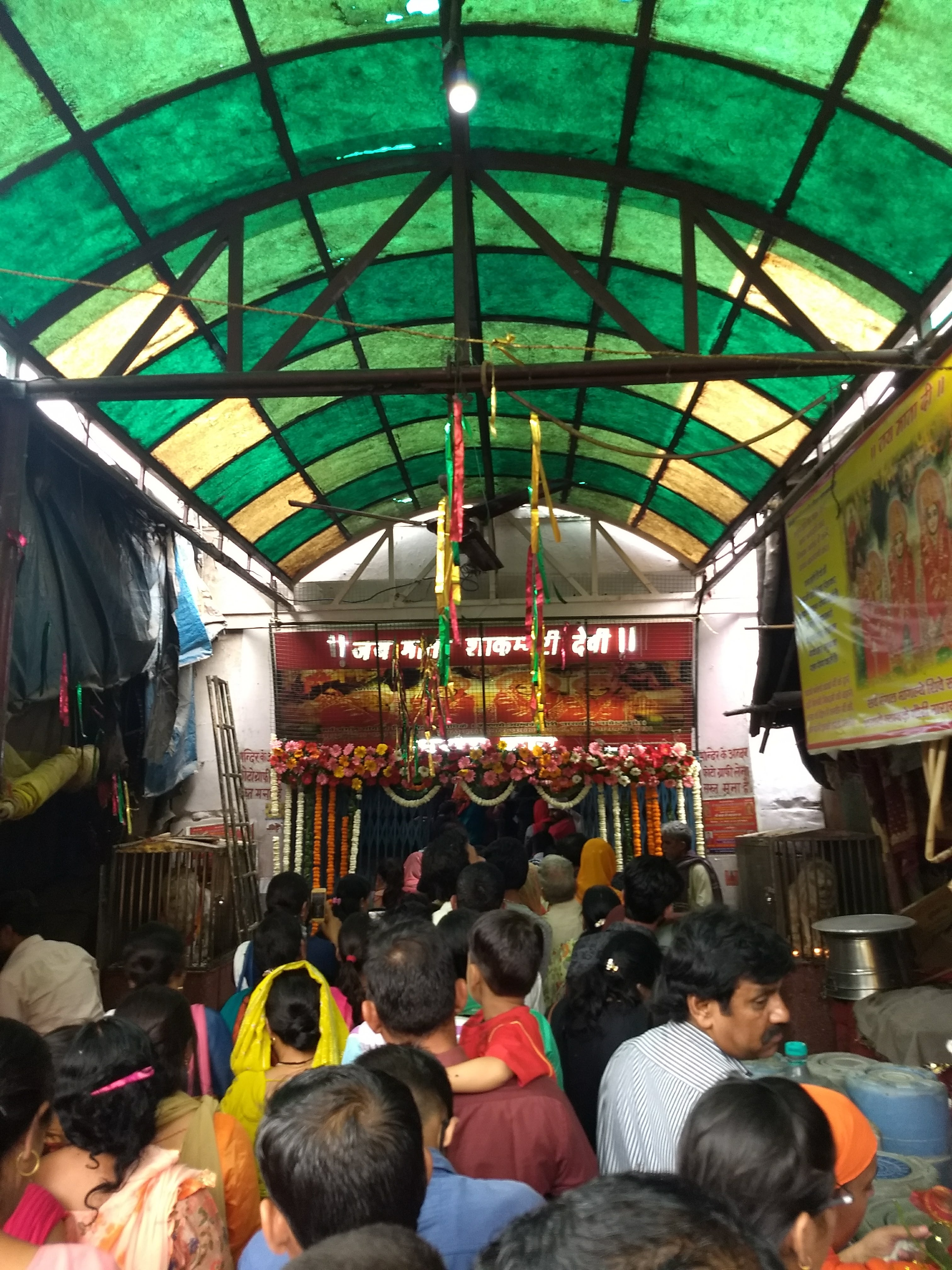
Siddhpeeth Shri Shakumbhari Devi Mandir Entrance Gate

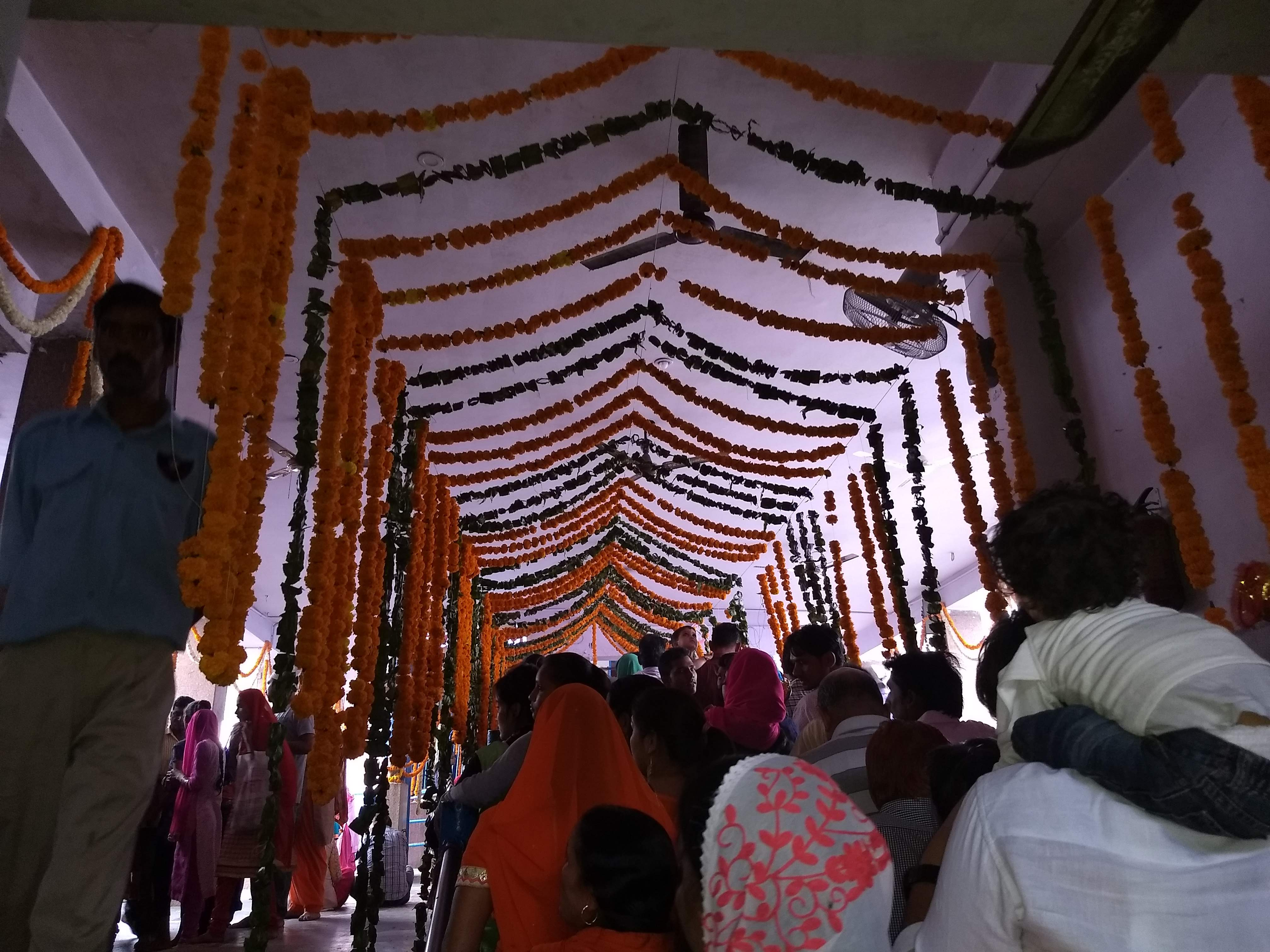
Devotees of Maa Shakumbhari Devi standing in ques to see Siddhpeeth Shri Shakumbhari Devi Mandir

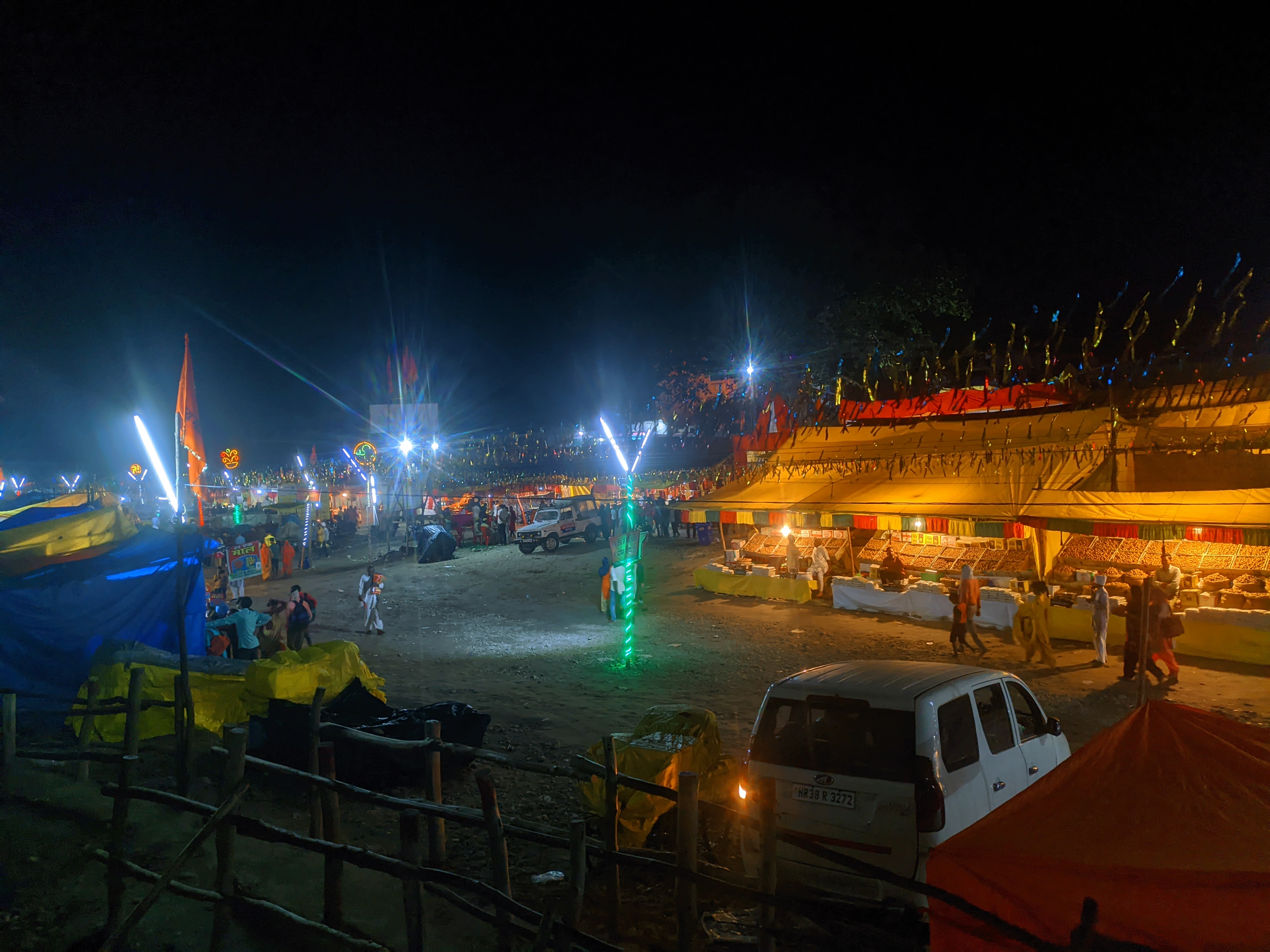
Night view of the fair at Siddhpeeth Shri Shakumbhari Devi Mandir

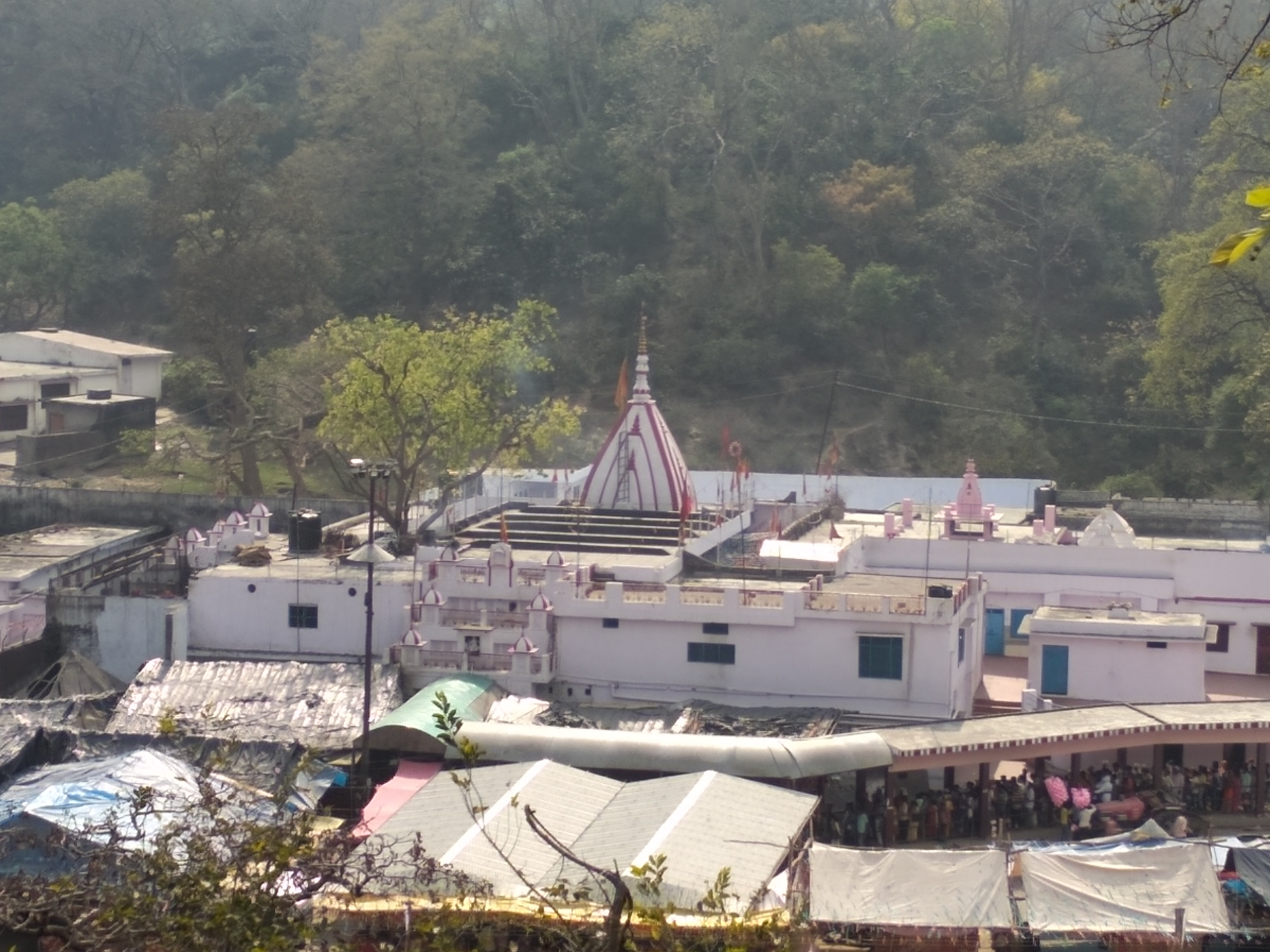

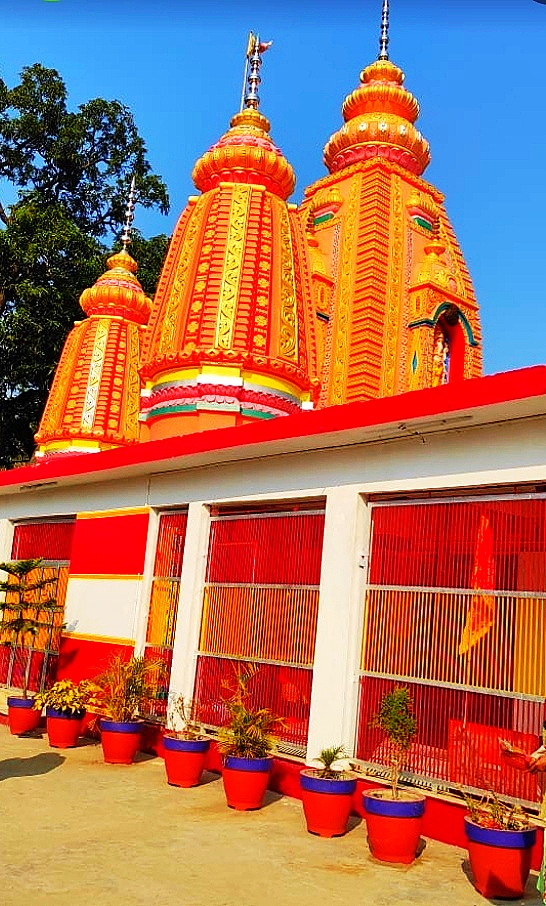
Sidhpeeth Baba Bhura Dev Temple

== Nearby attractions ==
- Bhura Dev Temple, it is dedicated to Hindu deity Bhairava
- Bala Sundari Devi Temple, dedicated to Goddess Bala Sundari
