= Dhandera railway station =

Railway station in Uttarakhand

Dhandera

General information
- Location: Ashok Nagar, Dhandera, Haridwar district, Uttarakhand; India
- Coordinates: 29°50′36″N 77°54′07″E
- Elevation: 267 m (876 ft)
- System: Passenger train station
- Owner: Indian Railways
- Operator: Northern Railway
- Line: Moradabad–Ambala line
- Platforms: 2
- Tracks: 2

Construction
- Structure type: Standard (on ground station)

Other information
- Status: Active
- Station code: DNRA
- Zone(s): Northern Railway zone
- Division(s): Moradabad

History
- Opened: 1886
- Former names: Oudh and Rohilkhand Railway

Services
Preceding station	Indian Railways	Following station
Landhaura towards ?	Northern Railway zone Moradabad–Ambala line	Roorkee towards ?
Location

Dhandera railway station is a railway station on Moradabad–Ambala line under the Moradabad railway division of Northern Railway zone. This is situated at Ashok Nagar, Dhandera in Haridwar district of the Indian state of Uttarakhand.
