= Ambehta Shekhan =

- Village
- Location within Uttar Pradesh Location within India
- Coordinates: 29°38′55″N 77°37′16″E
- Country: India
- State: Uttar Pradesh
- District: Saharanpur
- Elevation: 252 m (827 ft)

Population (2011)
  - Total: 7,771

Languages
  - Official: Hindi
- Time zone: UTC+5:30 (IST)
- PIN: 247554
- Vehicle registration: UP
- Website: up.gov.in

Ambehta Shekhan is a village in Saharanpur district in the Indian state of Uttar Pradesh.

== Geography ==
Ambehta Shekhan is located at 29°38′55″N 77°37′16″E.
