= Furqan Ahmad =

Indian politician

Member Uttarakhand Legislative Assembly
- Incumbent
- Assumed office 2012
- Constituency: Piran Kaliyar

Personal details
- Born: 6 November 1969 (age 56)
- Party: Indian National Congress

Furqan Ahmad is an Indian politician from Uttarakhand and a three term Member of the Uttarakhand Legislative Assembly. Furqan represents the Piran Kaliyar (Uttarakhand Assembly constituency). Furqan is a member of the Indian National Congress.

== Electoral performance ==
Election	Constituency	Party	Result	Votes %	Opposition Candidate	Opposition Party	Opposition vote %	Ref
2022	Piran Kaliyar	INC	Won	44.16%	Munish Kumar Saini	BJP	28.19%	
2017	Piran Kaliyar	INC	Won	32.27%	Jaibhagwan	BJP	30.78%	
2012	Piran Kaliyar	INC	Won	35.02%	Shahzad	BSP	32.39%	
2007	Roorkee	INC	Lost	32.14%	Suresh Chand Jain	BJP	41.82%	
