= Gopali =

Village in Uttar Pradesh, India

Coordinates: 29°38′N 77°46′E

Gopali is a village situated in the Deoband Mandal, of Saharanpur District, Uttar Pradesh, India. The village 11.08 kilometres from its Mandal headquarters at Deoband.

Villages nearby include Kendki (1.8 km), Thitki (2.0 km), Tighri (2.0 km), Fulasi (2.4 km), Kuralki (3.2 km), Fulas Akbarpur (3.3 km) and Rajupur (4.1 km).
