= Pranav Singh =

Indian politician

Member of Uttarakhand Legislative Assembly
- In office 2012 – March 2022
- Preceded by: Constituency created
- Succeeded by: Umesh Kumar
- Constituency: Khanpur
- In office 2002–2012
- Preceded by: Muhammad Muhiuddin
- Succeeded by: Sanjay Gupta
- Constituency: Laksar

Personal details
- Born: 6 April 1966 (age 60) Haridwar
- Party: Bharatiya Janata Party (from 2020) (2016–19)
- Other political affiliations: Indian National Congress (2007–16)
- Spouse: Devyani Singh
- Children: Divye Pratap Singh
- Parent: Narendra Singh (father)
- Website: http://pranavchampion.in

Kunwar Pranav Singh (born 6 April 1966) is an Indian politician who served as member of the Uttarakhand Legislative Assembly where he represented the Khanpur and Laksar constituencies for two terms each. He was elected for four consecutive terms and was one of the senior members of the Uttarakhand Legislative Assembly. He has also served as a cabinet-rank official in the previous state governments under the Chief-Ministership of N. D. Tiwari, Vijay Bahuguna & Harish Rawat.

== Career ==
Singh contested from Laksar in 2002 as Independent and in 2007 as Indian National Congress Candidate and from Khanpur in 2012 as a candidate of the Indian National Congress (INC) and in 2017 as Bhartiya Janata Party Candidate and Won in all elections. In May 2016, along with eight other legislators, he revolted against the Harish Rawat-led INC government in the State. Around this time, he quit the INC and joined the BJP. He was disqualified as a legislator under the anti-defection law. He was suspended for 3 months from Bharatiya Janata Party on 23, June 2019, following his feud with another lawmaker Deshraj Karanwal. On 11 July 2019, Bharatiya Janata Party extended the suspension of Pranav Singh Champion for an indefinite period because he appeared in a controversial video which showed him dancing with guns and comparing the size of the state he represents to his genitals. The video went viral on social media, causing embarrassment to the party. He later rejoined the party in 2020, after his suspension was revoked. His wife (Devyani Singh) fought election in 2022 from Khanpur came 3rd with 30,834 votes against independent candidate Umesh Kumar. On 27, January 2025, he was arrested for firing a gun outside the camp office of an Umesh Kumar.
