= Divye Pratap Singh =

Indian shooter (born 1996)

Kunwar Divye Pratap Singh
Personal information
- Nationality: Indian
- Born: 1996 (age 29–30) Dehradun, India
- Height: 2.04 m (6 ft 8 1/2 in)
- Weight: 110 kg (243 lb)

Sport
- Country: India
- Sport: Shooting
- Event: Double Trap
Medal record
Representing India
Men's shooting
Thailand Open Shotgun Championship
Gold medal – first place	2017 Bangkok	Men's Double Trap Team
International Junior Shotgun Cup
Bronze medal – third place	2015 Finland	Jr. Men's Double Trap Team

Kunwar Divye Pratap Singh (born 1996) is an Indian shooter. He won the bronze medal at the 2015 International Junior Shotgun Cup in Finland. At the 2017 Open Shooting Championships in Thailand, he won gold in the senior men's shotgun double trap category. He represents his home State Uttarakhand at the National Games. He is the son of former legislator Kunwar Pranav Singh Champion.
