= Laksar =

Laksar Laksari
- Town
- Location in Uttarakhand, India Laksar (India)
- Coordinates: 29.749°N 78.024°E
- Country: India
- State: Uttarakhand
- District: Haridwar

Area
  - Total: 17 km^{2} (6.6 sq mi)
  - Rank: 1
- Elevation: 287 m (942 ft)

Population (2012)
  - Total: 50,450
  - Rank: 77%
  - Density: 3,000/km^{2} (7,700/sq mi)

Languages
  - Official: Hindi
  - Native: Khariboli
- Time zone: UTC+5:30 (IST)
- PIN: 247663
- Telephone code: 1332
- Vehicle registration: UK 17, UK08
- Website: 210.212.78.56/laksar/

Laksar is a small town, near Haridwar city and Nagar Palika in Haridwar district of the Indian state of Uttarakhand, situated along National Highway 334A. It is an important sugar manufacturing destination in the state and also known for the Laksar Junction railway station (LRJ), the largest railway junction in the state, which was built in 1866.

== History ==
Laksar has been a significant center for sugar manufacturing in Uttarakhand. One of the earliest mills, Rai Bahadur Narain Singh Sugar Mills was established in 1932, by Rai Bahadur Narain Singh who was a member of the Constituent Assembly.

== Geography ==
Laksar has an average elevation of 227 metres (745 feet). It is situated between the towns of Khanpur and Sultanpur, and close to the towns of Pathri, Jhabrera and Roorkee in Haridwar district.

== MLA (Member of Legislative Assembly) ==
Laksar Assembly constituency (34) is one of the seventy electoral constituencies of the Uttarakhand Legislative Assembly. The area around Laksar is dominated by the Gurjar, Hindu community, and the current MLA is Sehjad. Prior MLAs serving Laksar were as follows:

- 1991: Tejpal Singh Panwar, Bharatiya Janata Party
- 1993: Tejpal Singh Panwar, Bharatiya Janata Party
- 1996: Mohammad Mohiuddin, Bahujan Samaj Party
- 2002: Pranav Singh, Independent
- 2007: Pranav Singh, Indian National Congress
- 2012: Sanjay Gupta, Bharatiya Janata Party
- 2017: Sanjay Gupta, Bharatiya Janata Party
- 2022: Muhammad Shahzad, Bahujan Samaj Party

== Demographics ==
As of the 2001 India census, Laksar had a population of 18,240. Males constituted 54% of the population and females 46%. Laksar had an average literacy rate of 68%, higher than the national average of 59.5%: male literacy was listed at 75%, and female literacy at 59%. In Laksar, 15% of the population is under 6 years of age.

== Transport ==
Laksar is well connected by road with Haridwar, Saharanpur, and Roorkee cities, and Laksar Junction railway station lies within the city. It was first connected with city of Haridwar through branch line in 1886, when the Awadh-Rohilkhand Railway line was extended through Roorkee to Saharanpur, this was later extended to Dehradun in 1900.

The nearest airport is Jolly Grant Airport, Dehradun, though Indira Gandhi International Airport in New Delhi is preferred.

== Local administration ==
Today, Laksar is one of the four tehsils in the Haridwar district, and one of its six development blocks.

Nagar Palika elections were held in Laksar for the first time in 1995. The current MLA of Laksar is Muhammad Shahzad , in his first tenure from the Laksar region.
