= Shakambhari Purnima =

Hindu festival

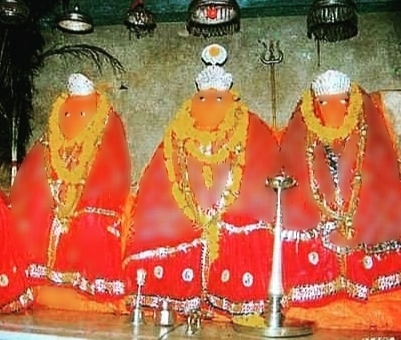
- Murti of the goddess Shakambhari, Shakambhari Devi Temple, Saharanpur
- Official name: Shakambhari Purnima
- Observed by: Hindus
- Date: Purnima (full moon) of Pausha

Shakambhari Purnima (Sanskrit: Śākambharī Purṇimā) is a Hindu festival primarily observed in India in veneration of the goddess Shakambhari. It is observed in the month of Pausha, which usually corresponds with January. Shakambari Purnima is the last day in the 8-day long holiday of Shakambari Navaratri.

== Legend ==
Shakambhari is a Hindu goddess of nourishment, a form of Mahadevi who manifested on earth to save the world from a drought and by slaying the asura who caused it, named Durgama, and restoring the sacred Vedas he had seized back to the Brahmins. According to the Devi Bhagavata Purana, the goddess answered the plea of the Brahmins by producing vegetative products from her own form to feed all the creatures of the earth. She is described to watch over beings to ensure that they are not short of food and water, as well as punishing those who commit sins and evil.

== Practices ==
Puja is performed for the goddess both at the houses of adherents and at temples on this occasion. They wake up early, take an auspicious bath, and offer special prayers. A murti of the goddess is venerated with the arati ceremony, with diyas lighted and flowers and sweets ritually offered to the deity. Scriptures such as the Durga Chalisa might be recited.

The Shakambhari Devi Temple of the Saharanpur district of Uttar Pradesh venerates the goddess on this occasion.

== See also ==
- Thaipusam
