= Behat =

- Town
- Location in district Saharanpur Uttar Pradesh, India
- Coordinates: 30°10′N 77°37′E
- Country: India
- State: Uttar Pradesh
- District: Saharanpur

Government
  - Type: Indian
- Elevation: 345 m (1,132 ft)

Population (2011)
  - Total: 8,574

Languages
  - Official: Hindi, Khariboli, Urdu, Gujjari
- Time zone: UTC+5:30 (IST)
- Vehicle registration: UP 11

Behat is an ancient town, near Saharanpur and nagar panchayat of Saharanpur district on the northernmost tip of northwestern Uttar Pradesh, India. It is located on NH-709B on the banks of Eastern Yamuna Canal, about 30 km (18 miles) north of Saharanpur, 190 km (118 miles) from New Delhi, and 77 km (48 miles) from Haridwar. It has an average elevation of 345 m above sea level. It is famous for the production of fruits such as mangoes, guavas, moorhas (reed stools), brass bells, and wrought iron handicrafts. It is home to the Mata Shakumbari Devi Temple.

== History ==
Archaeological excavations and surveys provided evidence of the existence of many ancient settlements in and around Behat. Based on the artifacts discovered during these excavations, human habitation in and around this area is traced back to 2000 BCE. It is conjectured that Behat was known as Brihat-vat during the reign of the Nanda Dynasty (circa 501 BCE).

An Ashoka pillar excavated from Topari (Khiderabād), near Saharanpur, was taken to Delhi by Sultan Firoz Shah Tughluq, and still resides in Feroze Shah Kotla. Mayapur and Behat were well-known cities in the Mauryan Dynasty (circa 180 BCE). Behat was next to Mayapur in importance, because it was an important Buddhist centre.

Xuanzang traveled through Behat and had come across important Buddhist monasteries in Behat (circa 630 CE) while searching sacred Buddhist texts and scriptures.

During the reign of Bahlul Khan Lodi (1451-1489), a Muslim colony was founded in Behat by Shah Abdullah, who was a descendant of Saint Sheikh Baha-ud-din Zakariya Suhrawardi. The western part of Behat along the Naugaon Rau is named Abdullah Mazra after him.

Behat remained the headquarters of a Paragana during the time of Akbar and was known as Behat Kanjawar.

Behat was under the control of the Pirzadas, who were notorious for cow-slaughter and terrorised the Hindus of the region. When the Sikhs under Banda Bahadur Singh learnt of this, they attacked the town, decimating the Pirzada clans.

In 1834, Captain Proby Thomas Cautley discovered a buried town 5.18 m (17 ft) below the surrounding country and 7.62 m (25 ft) under the preexisting site while supervising the redesign of the Eastern Yamuna Canal (then known as the Doab Canal). The township was from pre-Indo Scythian times according to archaeological evidence found there. Cautley also found a large number of Indo Scythian coins and other pieces of evidence about the existence of a large Buddhist settlement.

After the Indian Rebellion of 1857, a police station was established in Behat. Towards the end of the 19th century, the town had a post office and an upper primary school. An annual fair organised by Pirzadas was held in honor of Shah Abdullah until the end of the 19th century, chiefly organized by the local Pirzadas who then fell into difficult times due to their extravagance.

After India became independent in 1947, the government has neglected the area; as a result, Behat has made little progress in last 70 years.

== Geography ==
- The city is located 30.1°N and 77°E, north of Saharanpur. The city sits on the same latitude as Jagadhri and Rishikesh.
- The district is at the northernmost limit of the Uttar Pradesh where the border with the city of Paonta Sahib is in the north at 30.4°N latitude almost coinciding with latitude north of Ambala and Dehradun. It is located near the city of Badshahibagh and Kalesar, with all four states having borders nearby.
- The average elevation is about 345 meters above the mean sea level.
- The entire place slightly slopes from north-east to south-west though unevenly.

== Demographics ==
The 2011 India census reports that Behat had a population of 20,474, 53.16% of which were males and 46.83% were females. Behat has an average literacy rate of 70.03%, lower than the national average of 74.04%, with 75.95% of the males and 63.28% of females literate. 15.12% of the population is under six years of age.

== Economy ==
Behat's economy has been focused on agriculture for the last 200 years. The Western Yamuna Canal irrigates most of the arable land in Behat and crops have been good dueto rich soils. Behat is also one of the most suitable areas for growing fruits and mango orchards slowly took over as mainstay of the economy.

== See also ==
- Behat (Assembly constituency)
- Government of Uttar Pradesh
- List of Vidhan Sabha constituencies of Uttar Pradesh
- Uttar Pradesh
- Uttar Pradesh Legislative Assembly
