= Roorkee Assembly constituency =

Constituency of the Uttarakhand legislative assembly in India

Coordinates: 29.86°N 77.89°E

Roorkee
- Constituency No. 31 for the Uttarakhand Legislative Assembly

Constituency details
- Country: India
- Region: North India
- State: Uttarakhand
- District: Haridwar
- Lok Sabha constituency: Haridwar
- Established: 1962
- Total electors: 121,468
- Reservation: None

Member of Legislative Assembly
- 5th Uttarakhand Legislative Assembly
- Incumbent Pradip Batra
- Party: Bharatiya Janata Party
- Elected year: 2022

Roorkee Legislative Assembly constituency is one of the seventy electoral Uttarakhand Legislative Assembly constituencies of Uttarakhand state in India. It includes Roorkee area.

Roorkee Legislative Assembly constituency is a part of Haridwar (Lok Sabha constituency). The constituency also covers 24 wards of the Roorkee Municipal Corporation and the Roorkee Cantonment area.

== Members of Legislative Assembly ==
Election	Name	Party
1962	Jagdish Narayan Sinha	Indian National Congress
1967	Jagdish Narayan Sinha	Indian National Congress
1969	Jagdish Narayan Sinha	Indian National Congress
1974	Rao Mushtaq Ali	Bharatiya Lok Dal
1977	Rao Mushtaq Ali	Janata Party
1980	Ram Singh	Indian National Congress
1985	Muhammad Muhiuddin	Lok Dal
1989	Ram Singh Saini	Indian National Congress
1991	Prithvi Singh	Bharatiya Janata Party
1993	Prithvi Singh	Bharatiya Janata Party
1996	Ram Singh Saini	Samajwadi Party
Major boundary changes
2002	Suresh Chand Jain	Bharatiya Janata Party
2007	Suresh Chand Jain	Bharatiya Janata Party
Major boundary changes
2012	Pradip Batra	Indian National Congress
2017	Pradip Batra	Bharatiya Janata Party
2022	Pradip Batra	Bharatiya Janata Party

== Election results ==
=== 2027 Assembly election ===
2027 Uttarakhand Legislative Assembly election: Roorkee
Party	Candidate	Votes	%	±%
INC				
BJP				
NOTA	None of the above			
Majority				
Turnout				
gain from		Swing		

=== Assembly Election 2022 ===
2022 Uttarakhand Legislative Assembly election: Roorkee
Party	Candidate	Votes	%	±%
BJP	Pradip Batra	36,986	48.21%	▼6.95
INC	Yashpal Rana	34,709	45.24%	▲7.38
BSP	Tanveer Ahmed	2,932	3.81%	▼0.66
AAP	Naresh Kumar (Prince)	753	0.98%	New
Independent	Nitin Sharma	742	0.97%	New
NOTA	None of the above	302	0.39%	▼0.02
Margin of victory		2,277	2.97%	▼14.33
Turnout		76,714	63.05%	▼1.01
Registered electors		1,21,681		▲7.49
BJP hold		Swing	▼6.95	

=== Assembly Election 2017 ===
2017 Uttarakhand Legislative Assembly election: Roorkee
Party	Candidate	Votes	%	±%
BJP	Pradip Batra	40,000	55.16%	▲18.72
INC	Suresh Chand Jain	27,458	37.87%	▲0.12
BSP	Ram Subhag Singh	3,239	4.47%	▼11.46
SP	Sunita Singh	918	1.27%	New
NOTA	None of the above	303	0.42%	New
Margin of victory		12,542	17.30%	▲15.99
Turnout		72,512	64.05%	▲0.28
Registered electors		1,13,205		▲17.63
BJP gain from INC		Swing	▲17.42	

=== Assembly Election 2012 ===
2012 Uttarakhand Legislative Assembly election: Roorkee
Party	Candidate	Votes	%	±%
INC	Pradip Batra	23,164	37.74%	▲5.61
BJP	Suresh Chand Jain	22,363	36.44%	▼5.38
BSP	Nayyer Azam	9,772	15.92%	▼0.13
Independent	Manohar Lal Sharma	3,228	5.26%	New
Independent	Bharat Bhushan Kalra	1,200	1.96%	New
Independent	Satish Rohela Advocate	855	1.39%	New
Margin of victory		801	1.31%	▼8.37
Turnout		61,372	63.77%	▲5.99
Registered electors		96,239		
INC gain from BJP		Swing	▼4.07	

=== Assembly Election 2007 ===
2007 Uttarakhand Legislative Assembly election: Roorkee
Party	Candidate	Votes	%	±%
BJP	Suresh Chand Jain	27,136	41.82%	▲7.63
INC	Furqan Ahmad	20,855	32.14%	▲5.80
BSP	Ram Singh Saini	10,419	16.06%	▼0.93
UKD	Sanjay Kumar	2,967	4.57%	▼0.15
Independent	Subhash Saini	1,336	2.06%	New
SP	Ashok	904	1.39%	▼6.70
Margin of victory		6,281	9.68%	▲1.83
Turnout		64,892	57.79%	▲7.29
Registered electors		1,12,305		
BJP hold		Swing	▲7.63	

=== Assembly Election 2002 ===
2002 Uttaranchal Legislative Assembly election: Roorkee
Party	Candidate	Votes	%	±%
BJP	Suresh Chand Jain	16,338	34.19%	New
INC	Manohar Lal Sharma	12,587	26.34%	New
BSP	Piyush	8,116	16.98%	New
SP	Raj Kumar Saini	3,870	8.10%	New
UKD	Sanjay Kumar	2,259	4.73%	New
Uttarakhand Janwadi Party	Ravindra Kumar	1,276	2.67%	New
RLD	Padam Singh	947	1.98%	New
Independent	Nazim	587	1.23%	New
INLD	Fakre Alam	556	1.16%	New
JP	Afzal	466	0.98%	New
Independent	Mahender Sharma	363	0.76%	New
Margin of victory		3,751	7.85%	
Turnout		47,790	50.54%	
Registered electors		94,641		
BJP win (new seat)				
