= Fazalpur railway station =

Railway station in Uttar Pradesh

Fazalpur

General information
- Location: Humayun Puriddu, Bijnor district, Uttar Pradesh; India
- Coordinates: 29°35′37″N 78°16′41″E
- Elevation: 264 m (866 ft)
- System: Passenger train station
- Owner: Indian Railways
- Operator: Northern Railway
- Line: Moradabad–Ambala line
- Platforms: 2
- Tracks: 2

Construction
- Structure type: Standard (on ground station)

Other information
- Status: Active
- Station code: FZL
- Zone(s): Northern Railway zone
- Division(s): Moradabad

History
- Opened: 1886
- Former names: Oudh and Rohilkhand Railway

Services
Preceding station	Indian Railways	Following station
Najibabad Junction towards ?	Northern Railway zone Moradabad–Ambala line	Muzzampur Narayan towards ?
Location

Fazalpur railway station is a railway station on Moradabad–Ambala line under the Moradabad railway division of Northern Railway zone. This is situated at Humayun Puriddu in Bijnor district of the Indian state of Uttar Pradesh.
