= Pradip Batra =

Indian politician

Pradeep Batra

Member of the Uttarakhand Legislative Assembly
- Incumbent
- Assumed office 2012
- Preceded by: Suresh Chand Jain
- Constituency: Roorkee

Personal details
- Party: Bharatiya Janata Party
- Other political affiliations: Indian National Congress
- Parent: Ram Prakash
- Education: Post Graduate
- Alma mater: B.S.M. Degree College Roorkee, Haridwar

Pradeep Batra is an Indian politician and member of the Bharatiya Janata Party. Batra is currently serving as the minister of Transportation, Information Technology and Good Governance, Science and Technology, Biotechnology in the Government of Uttarakhand. in the Government of Uttarakhand. He is a member of the Uttarakhand Legislative Assembly from the Roorkee constituency in Haridwar district.

== Electoral performance ==
Election	Constituency	Party	Result	Votes %	Opposition Candidate	Opposition Party	Opposition vote %	Ref
2022	Roorkee	BJP	Won	48.21%	Yashpal Rana	INC	45.24%	
2017	Roorkee	BJP	Won	55.16%	Suresh Chand Jain	INC	37.87%	
2012	Roorkee	INC	Won	37.74%	Suresh Chand Jain	BJP	36.44%	
