= Narendra Singh (politician) =

Indian politician

Member Uttar Pradesh Legislative Assembly
- In office 1985–1989
- Constituency: Laksar Vidhan Sabha Constituency

Personal details
- Died: 22 January 2024
- Party: Bharatiya Janata Party
- Other political affiliations: Bharatiya Lok Dal
- Children: Kunwar Pranav Singh 'Champion'
- Occupation: Politician

Raja Narendra Singh (died 22 January 2024) was an Indian politician from the state of Uttarakhand, India. Raja Narendra Singh was a member of the Bharatiya Janata Party and formerly the Bharatiya Lok Dal, representing the Laksar Vidhan Sabha Constituency. He lived in Landhaura state and was the father of Kunwar Pranav Singh.
