= Sarsawa Airport =

Domestic airport in Saharanpur, Uttar Pradesh, India

- IATA: SWN; ICAO: VISP

Summary
- Airport type: Civil Enclave
- Owner: Indian Air Force
- Operator: Airports Authority of India
- Serves: Saharanpur
- Location: Sarsawa, Saharanpur district, Uttar Pradesh, India
- Coordinates: 29.9895554°N 77.4080063°E

Map

Runways
Direction	Length		Surface
Direction	ft	m	Surface
09/27	9,000 x 150	2,743 x 46	Concrete

Sarsawa Airport, also known as Saharanpur Airport, is an upcoming domestic airport (civil enclave at the Indian Air Force's Sarsawa Air Force Station) in Saharanpur district in the state of Uttar Pradesh, India. The civil terminal of airport will be built at 20 km away from Saharanpur and 2.5 km away from Sarsawa.

== Proposed destinations ==
Under Regional Connectivity Scheme UDAN, it is proposed to have direct flights to Lucknow, Prayagaraj, Gorakhpur, Varanasi, Kanpur, Kushinagar and Ayodhya.

== See also ==
- Airports in Delhi NCR with scheduled commercial flights
- Delhi NCR Transport Plan
- Lal Bahadur Shastri International Airport
- Hisar Airport
- List of airports in India
- List of the busiest airports in India
