= Taslim Ahmad =

Indian politician

Member of Uttarakhand Legislative Assembly
- In office 2002–2012
- Constituency: Laldhang

Personal details
- Party: Azad Samaj Party (Kanshi Ram) (since 2022)
- Other political affiliations: Bahujan Samaj Party (until 2017) Indian National Congress (2017-2022)

Taslim Ahmad is an Indian politician from Uttarakhand and a former member of Uttarakhand Legislative Assembly representing the Laldhang Assembly constituency as a party member of the Bahujan Samaj Party. He also contested for the Laksar Assembly constituency unsuccessfully as a candidate of the BSP, INC and the ASP in the 2012, 2017, 2022 elections respectively.
