= Bachiti =

Village in Uttar Pradesh, India

Bachiti is a village situated in Nagal Mandal of Saharanpur District in Uttar Pradesh, India. The village is located about 17.63 kilometres from its Mandal headquarters in Nagal, and is 457 kilometres from the Uttar Pradesh state capital Lucknow.

Villages near by include Bhataul (2.7 km), Kheda Mugal (3.3 km), Ganjheri (3.5 km), Shivpur (3.5 km), Kapoori Govindpur (3.6 km), Tajpur (3.8 km) and Ismailpur Gujjar (4.3 km).
