= Khanpur, Uttarakhand Assembly constituency =

Constituency of the Uttarakhand legislative assembly in India

Coordinates: 29.65°N 78.02°E

Khanpur
- Constituency No. 32 for the Uttarakhand Legislative Assembly

Constituency details
- Country: India
- Region: North India
- State: Uttarakhand
- District: Haridwar
- Lok Sabha constituency: Haridwar
- Total electors: 147,459
- Reservation: None

Member of Legislative Assembly
- 5th Uttarakhand Legislative Assembly
- Incumbent Vacant

Khanpur Legislative Assembly constituency is one of the seventy electoral Uttarakhand Legislative Assembly constituencies of Uttarakhand state in India. It includes Khanpur area of Haridwar District.

Khanpur (Uttarakhand Assembly constituency) is a part of Haridwar (Lok Sabha constituency).

== Members of the Legislative Assembly ==
Election	Member	Party
2012	Pranav Singh	Indian National Congress
2017	Pranav Singh	Bharatiya Janata Party
2022	Umesh Kumar Sharma	Independent politician

== Election results ==
=== 2027 Assembly election ===
2027 Uttarakhand Legislative Assembly election: Khanpur
Party	Candidate	Votes	%	±%
INC				
BJP				
NOTA	None of the above			
Majority				
Turnout				
gain from		Swing		

=== Assembly Election 2022 ===
2022 Uttarakhand Legislative Assembly election: Khanpur
Party	Candidate	Votes	%	±%
Independent	Umesh Kumar Sharma	38,767	34.18%	New
BSP	Ravindra Singh	31,915	28.14%	▼8.69
BJP	Rani Devyani	30,834	27.18%	▼22.47
INC	Subhash Singh Choudhary	6,289	5.54%	▼0.89
ASP(KR)	Shameem Ahmed Sabri	2,082	1.84%	New
Rashtrawadi Janlok Party (Satya)	Munesh Kumar	1,056	0.93%	New
AAP	Manorma Tyagi	805	0.71%	New
Independent	Neelu Choudhary	618	0.54%	New
NOTA	None of the above	544	0.48%	▼0.01
Margin of victory		6,852	6.04%	▼6.78
Turnout		1,13,435	76.65%	▼2.36
Registered electors		1,47,998		▲9.13
Independent gain from BJP		Swing	▼15.47	

=== Assembly Election 2017 ===
2017 Uttarakhand Legislative Assembly election: Khanpur
Party	Candidate	Votes	%	±%
BJP	Pranav Singh	53,192	49.65%	▲27.35
BSP	Mufti Riyasat Ali	39,457	36.83%	▲13.80
INC	Yashveer Singh	6,894	6.43%	▼19.82
Independent	Ravinder Singh	4,856	4.53%	New
Independent	Sunil	729	0.68%	New
NOTA	None of the above	523	0.49%	New
Margin of victory		13,735	12.82%	▲9.60
Turnout		1,07,136	79.00%	▲0.19
Registered electors		1,35,612		▲21.60
BJP gain from INC		Swing	▲23.40	

=== Assembly Election 2012 ===
2012 Uttarakhand Legislative Assembly election: Khanpur
Party	Candidate	Votes	%	±%
INC	Pranav Singh	23,072	26.25%	New
BSP	Kulveer Singh	20,241	23.03%	New
BJP	Ravinder Singh	19,596	22.30%	New
Independent	Riyasat	18,730	21.31%	New
MD	Abdul Mannan	2,408	2.74%	New
URM	Sanjay Pal	2,172	2.47%	New
RLD	Sadat Masood	467	0.53%	New
Margin of victory		2,831	3.22%	
Turnout		87,891	78.81%	
Registered electors		1,11,521		
INC win (new seat)				

== See also ==
- Landhaura (Uttarakhand Assembly constituency)
