= Laksar Assembly constituency =

Constituency of the Uttarakhand legislative assembly in India

Coordinates: 29.75°N 78.02°E

Laksar
- Constituency No. 34 for the Uttarakhand Legislative Assembly

Constituency details
- Country: India
- Region: North India
- State: Uttarakhand
- District: Haridwar
- Lok Sabha constituency: Haridwar
- Total electors: 102,483
- Reservation: None

Member of Legislative Assembly
- 5th Uttarakhand Legislative Assembly
- Incumbent Muhammad Shahzad
- Party: BSP
- Alliance: None
- Elected year: 2022

34-Laksar Legislative Assembly constituency is one of the seventy electoral Uttarakhand Legislative Assembly constituencies of Uttarakhand state in India. It includes Laksar area.

Laksar Legislative Assembly constituency is a part of Haridwar (Lok Sabha constituency).

== Members of Legislative Assembly ==
Year	Name	Party
1967	Syed Ahmed	Indian National Congress
1969	Sukhbir Singh	Bharatiya Lok Dal
1974	Muhammad Muhiuddin	Bharatiya Lok Dal
1977	Muhammad Muhiuddin	Janata Party
1980	Muhammad Muhiuddin	Janata Party
1985	Narendra Singh	Lok Dal
1989	Muhammad Muhiuddin	Indian National Congress
1991	Tejpal Singh Panwar	Bharatiya Janata Party
1993	Tejpal Singh Panwar	Bharatiya Janata Party
1996	Muhammad Muhiuddin	Bahujan Samaj Party
Major boundary changes
2002	Pranav Singh	Independent
2007	Pranav Singh	Indian National Congress
Major boundary changes
2012	Sanjay Gupta	Bharatiya Janata Party
2017	Sanjay Gupta	Bharatiya Janata Party
2022	Muhammad Shahzad	Bahujan Samaj Party

== Election results ==
=== 2027 Assembly election ===
2027 Uttarakhand Legislative Assembly election: Laksar
Party	Candidate	Votes	%	±%
INC				
BJP				
NOTA	None of the above			
Majority				
Turnout				
gain from		Swing		

=== Assembly Election 2022 ===
2022 Uttarakhand Legislative Assembly election: Laksar
Party	Candidate	Votes	%	±%
BSP	Shahzad	34,899	42.77%	▲17.60
BJP	Sanjay Gupta	24,459	29.98%	▼2.36
INC	Antriksh Saini	11,584	14.20%	▼16.09
ASP(KR)	Haji Taslim Ahmad	4,161	5.10%	New
Rashtrawadi Janlok Party (Satya)	Ajay	4,126	5.06%	New
AAP	Mohd Yusuf	815	1.00%	New
NOTA	None of the above	298	0.37%	▼0.00
Margin of victory		10,440	12.80%	▲10.74
Turnout		81,591	79.51%	▼2.44
Registered electors		1,02,620		▲7.71
BSP gain from BJP		Swing	▲10.43	

=== Assembly Election 2017 ===
2017 Uttarakhand Legislative Assembly election: Laksar
Party	Candidate	Votes	%	±%
BJP	Sanjay Gupta	25,248	32.34%	▼7.03
INC	Haji Taslim Ahmad	23,644	30.28%	▲18.14
BSP	Subhash Singh Choudhary	19,656	25.18%	▲1.58
Independent	Kushalpal Singh	6,087	7.80%	New
Independent	Sumit	2,415	3.09%	New
NOTA	None of the above	287	0.37%	New
Margin of victory		1,604	2.05%	▼13.72
Turnout		78,075	81.95%	▼0.27
Registered electors		95,274		▲18.87
BJP hold		Swing	▼7.03	

=== Assembly Election 2012 ===
2012 Uttarakhand Legislative Assembly election: Laksar
Party	Candidate	Votes	%	±%
BJP	Sanjay Gupta	25,945	39.37%	▲33.74
BSP	Haji Taslim Ahmad	15,551	23.60%	▼5.69
Independent	Tahir Hasan	13,042	19.79%	New
INC	Ram Singh Saini	8,001	12.14%	▼24.89
MD	Prem Singh	1,301	1.97%	New
Independent	Surendra Kumar Namdev	391	0.59%	New
Margin of victory		10,394	15.77%	▲8.02
Turnout		65,900	82.22%	▲10.27
Registered electors		80,150		
BJP gain from INC		Swing	▲2.34	

=== Assembly Election 2007 ===
2007 Uttarakhand Legislative Assembly election: Laksar
Party	Candidate	Votes	%	±%
INC	Kunwar Pranav Singh	27,038	37.03%	▲23.79
BSP	Pal Singh Kashyap	21,380	29.28%	▲7.60
Independent	Ravindra Singh (Paniyala)	16,077	22.02%	New
BJP	Ravindra Nagar	4,114	5.63%	▼1.91
SP	Surendra Saini	2,663	3.65%	▼0.66
Independent	Shashi Prabha	683	0.94%	New
Margin of victory		5,658	7.75%	▲4.57
Turnout		73,010	71.95%	▼1.25
Registered electors		1,01,473		
INC gain from Independent		Swing	▲12.17	

=== Assembly Election 2002 ===
2002 Uttaranchal Legislative Assembly election: Laksar
Party	Candidate	Votes	%	±%
Independent	Pranav Singh	14,903	24.86%	New
BSP	Qazi Muhammad Muhiuddin	12,996	21.68%	New
INC	Azmal Nawaz Khan	7,937	13.24%	New
Independent	Ranveer Singh	7,767	12.96%	New
BJP	Ch. Bijendra Singh	4,522	7.54%	New
Uttarakhand Janwadi Party	Ch. Rajendra Singh	3,784	6.31%	New
SP	Iqbal Singh	2,581	4.31%	New
Independent	Dharmpal Singh	2,516	4.20%	New
LJP	Virendra Kumar	620	1.03%	New
Independent	Chandra Shekhar Azad	500	0.83%	New
RTKP	Pratap Kumar Khatri Alias P .K. Khatri	455	0.76%	New
Margin of victory		1,907	3.18%	
Turnout		59,938	73.22%	
Registered electors		81,887		
Independent win (new seat)				

In 2000 Uttarakhand State was formed and the Assembly Constituency went in Uttarakhand.

1996

1996 Uttar Pradesh Legislative Assembly Election

● Qazi Muhammad Mohiuddin ( BSP ) : 63,325 Votes : 40.70%

● Kulveer Singh ( SP ) : 57,140 Votes : 36.72%

● Tejpal Singh Panwar ( BJP ) : 31,938 Votes : 20.53%

● Manga Ram ( BKKGP ) : 2,914 Votes : 1.87%

Majority - 6,185 Votes : 3.98%

Turnout - 1,55,601 Votes : 74.26%

Registered Electors : 2,09,536 Voters

1993

1993 Uttar Pradesh Legislative Assembly Election

● Tejpal Singh Panwar ( BJP ) : 36,793 Votes : 26.74%

● Kulveer Singh ( JD ) : 35,612 Votes : 25.88%

● Qazi Muhammad Mohiuddin ( INC ) : 32,315 Votes : 23.48%

● Suraj Mal ( BSP ) : 28,524 Votes : 20.73%

Majority - 1,181 Votes : 0.86%

Turnout - 1,37,599 Votes : 73.2%

Registered Electors : 1,87,977 Voters

1991

1991 Uttar Pradesh Legislative Assembly Election

● Tejpal Singh Panwar ( BJP ) : 36,700 Votes : 35.56%

● Kulveer Singh ( JD ) : 35,389 Votes : 34.29%

● Qazi Muhammad Mohiuddin ( INC ) : 20,782 Votes : 20.14%

● Suleman ( BSP ) : 3,156 Votes : 3.06%

● Suraj Mal ( IND ) : 2,597 Votes : 2.52%

● Muhammad Akhatar Chairman ( IND ) : 1,114 Votes : 1.08%

Majority - 1,311 Votes : 1.27%

Turnout - 1,03,207 Votes : 63.64%

Registered Electors : 1,62,174 Voters

1989

1989 Uttar Pradesh Legislative Assembly Election

● Qazi Muhammad Mohiuddin ( INC ) : 43,166 Votes : 42.32%

● Kunwar Narendra Singh ( JP ) : 39,390 Votes : 38.62%

● Nafees ( BSP ) : 18,111 Votes : 17.76%

Majority - 3,776 Votes : 3.70%

Turnout - 1,01,991 Votes : 62.41%

Registered Electors : 1,63,421 Voters

1985

1985 Uttar Pradesh Legislative Assembly Election

● Kunwar Narendra Singh ( LKD ) : 35,404 Votes : 43.77%

● Hukam Singh ( INC ) : 26,228 Votes : 32.43%

● Suleman ( IND ) : 13,740 Votes : 16.99%

● Anup Singh ( BJP ) : 1,117 Votes : 1.38%

● Madan Singh ( IND ) : 990 Votes : 1.22%

● Devendra ( IND ) : 988 Votes : 1.22%

● Jagdish Prasad ( IND ) : 812 Votes :1%

Majority - 9176 Votes : 11.34%

Turnout - 80,883 Votes : 58.43%

Registered Electors : 1,38,428 Voters

1980

1980 Uttar Pradesh Legislative Assembly Election

● Qazi Muhammad Mohiuddin [ JD(S) Charan Singh ] : 30,882 Votes : 41.61%

● Rahat Singh [ INC(I) ] : 26,457 Votes : 35.65%

● Saeed Ahmed [ INC(U) ] : 12,904 Votes : 17.39%

● Sadhu Ram [ JP(S) Raj Narain ] : 2,287 Votes : 3.08%

● Bhagwan Kishore ( BJP ) : 963 Votes : 1.30%

Majority - 4,425 Votes : 5.96%

Turnout - 74,220 Votes : 60.62%

Registered Electors : 1,22,435 Voters

1977

1977 Uttar Pradesh Legislative Assembly Election

● Qazi Mujammad Mohiuddin ( JP ) : 36,634 Votes : 55.06%

● Rahat Singh ( INC ) : 26,702 Votes : 40.14%

● Ghaseetu Ram ( IND ) : 2,631 Votes : 3.95%

Majority - 9,932 Votes : 9.92%

Turnout - 66,530 Votes : 61.59%

Registered Electors : 1,08,021 Voters

1974

1974 Uttar Pradesh Legislative Assembly Election

● Qazi Mohammad Mohiuddin ( BKD ) : 35,698 Votes : 48.61%

● Hukam Singh ( INC ) : 24,762 Votes : 33.72%

● Mangat Singh ( IND ) : 2,854 Votes : 3.89%

● Bhopal Singh ( BJS ) : 2,654 Votes : 3.61%

● Pruran Chand Vidyalankar [ INC(O) ] : 2,297 Votes : 3.13%

● Mawasi Ram ( SOP ) : 2,244 Votes : 3.06%

● Naseem (IND ) : 1,546 Votes : 2.11%

● Ved Priya ( IND ) : 774 Votes : 1.05%

Majority - 10,936 Votes : 14.89%

Turnout - 73,434 Votes : 71.06%

Registered Electors : 1,03,341 Voters
