= Kalanour railway station =

Railway station in Haryana

Kalanour

General information
- Location: Mandauli, Kalanour, Yamunanagar district, Haryana; India
- Coordinates: 30°04′57″N 77°20′28″E
- Elevation: 274 m (899 ft)
- System: Passenger train station
- Owner: Indian Railways
- Operator: Northern Railway
- Line: Moradabad–Ambala line
- Platforms: 3
- Tracks: 2

Construction
- Structure type: Standard (on ground station)

Other information
- Status: Active
- Station code: KNZ
- Zone(s): Northern Railway zone
- Division(s): Ambala

History
- Opened: 1886

Services
Preceding station	Indian Railways	Following station
Sarsawa towards ?	Northern Railway zone Moradabad–Ambala line	Jagadhri towards ?
Location

Kalanour railway station is a railway station on Moradabad–Ambala line under the Ambala railway division of Northern Railway zone. This is situated at Mandauli, Kalanour in Yamunanagar district of the Indian state of Haryana.
