= Miragpur =

Village in Uttar Pradesh

Coordinates: 29°41′39″N 77°44′47″E

Miragpur is a village situated in the Deoband Mandal of Saharanpur District in the state of Uttar Pradesh, India. The name of Miragpur, which has gained recognition across the country for being a drug-free village, has been added in the Asia Book of Records.
