= Umesh Kumar =

Indian politician and journalist

Umesh Kumar Sharma
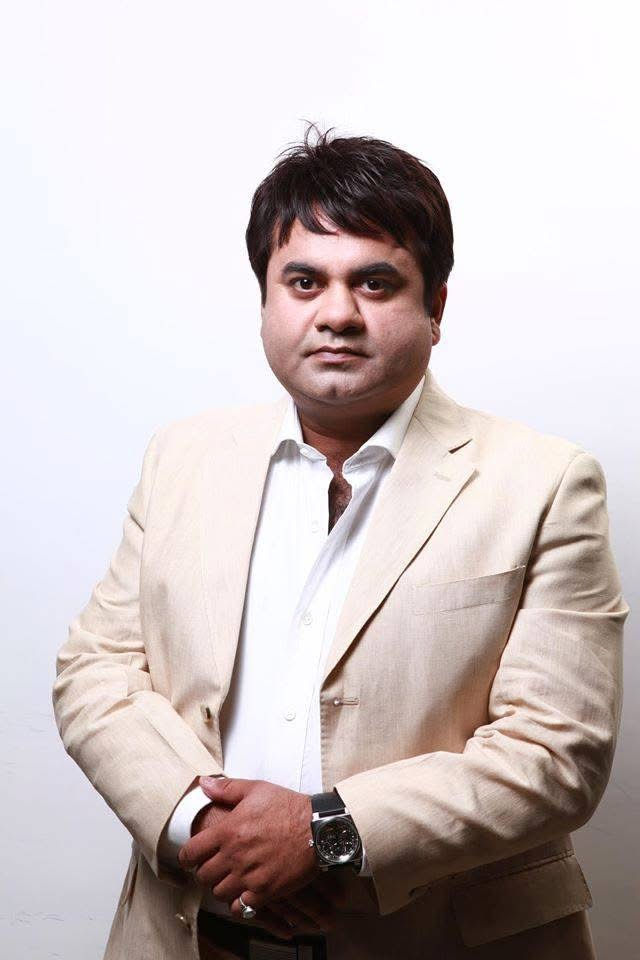

Member of the Uttarakhand Legislative Assembly
- In office 10 March 2022 – 28 October 2026
- Preceded by: Kunwar Pranav Singh
- Constituency: Khanpur

Personal details
- Party: Jan Nirman Party
- Other political affiliations: Independent
- Education: University of Delhi; Diploma in Media Law, London School of Journalism
- Occupation: Politician, journalist

Umesh Kumar Sharma is an Indian politician and journalist, who served as a member of the Uttarakhand Legislative Assembly from the Khanpur constituency from 2022 till his resignation in October 2026 as an independent politician. He is also known for his work as a journalist and media entrepreneur.

== Early life and education ==
Umesh Kumar studied at the University of Delhi and earned a diploma in Media Law from the London School of Journalism.

== Career ==
=== Journalism ===
Kumar serves as the CEO and editor-in-chief of media platforms, including News Plus OTT and Pahad TV, focusing on regional and national news in India.

=== Political career ===
In the 2022 Uttarakhand Legislative Assembly election, Umesh Kumar won the Khanpur constituency as an independent candidate, defeating the Ravindra Singh of Bahujan Samaj Party. He also contested the 2024 Indian general election from the Haridwar Lok Sabha constituency as an independent candidate but was unsuccessful.

In 2025, Kumar faced a notice from the Uttarakhand Legislative Assembly under the anti-defection law, requiring a response within three weeks.

On 27 October 2026, Kumar announced his decision to resign as an MLA, citing lack of demands raised by the opposition in the Assembly.

== Controversies ==
In 2025, Kumar was briefly detained following a reported firing incident involving former MLA Kunwar Pranav Singh. He was later released on bail. According to his election affidavit, Kumar has four pending criminal cases, including charges of unlawful assembly and voluntarily causing hurt.

== Personal life ==
Kumar resides in Haridwar, Uttarakhand. He is married, and his income sources include agriculture, media consultancy, and a firm.
