= Raipur Khas =

Village in Uttar Pradesh, India

Coordinates: 29°40′34″N 78°13′59″E

Raipur Khas is a village in India. It is located in the Najibabad block, Bijnor district of the state of Uttar Pradesh. raipur khas belongs to the Moradabad division, which is located 34 km north of the district Bijnor district and 22 km Kotdwar
