= Chandouk =

- town
- Location in U P India
- Coordinates: 29.560407°N 78.149547°E
- Country: India
- State: Uttar Pradesh
- District: Bijnor

Languages
  - Official: Hindi
- Time zone: UTC+5:30 (IST)

Chandouk also known as Chandok, is a town in Bijnor district, Uttar Pradesh, India. It has a railway station named Chandok railway station, a police station, and a government hospital. The Adarsh Gramin Inter College and the Kishori Lal Sharma Institute of Engineering and Technology are located in the town.

== Demographics ==
Per the 2011 Census of India, Chandouk had a total population of 2,900—1,528 of whom are male and 1,372 female.
