= Muhammad Muhiuddin =

Indian politician

Qazi Muhammad Muhiuddin

Member of Uttar Pradesh Legislative Assembly
- In office 1974–1985
- Constituency: Laksar
- In office 1985–1989
- Constituency: Roorkee
- In office 1989–1991
- Constituency: Laksar
- In office 1996–2000
- Constituency: Laksar

Member of Interim Uttaranchal Assembly
- In office 2000–2002
- Constituency: Laksar

Personal details
- Children: Muhammad Nizamuddin
- Education: Jamia Millia Islamia, University of Lucknow

Qazi Muhammad Muhiuddin was an Indian politician from Uttarakhand and Six term Member of the Uttar Pradesh Legislative Assembly from Laksar and Roorkee assembly constituency. He was a member of the various political parties from time to time. He served as Minister in Ram Naresh Yadav, Banarasi Das, Kalyan Singh and Mayawati Cabinet.

== Positions held ==
| Year | Description |
|---|---|
| 1974–1977 | Elected to 6th Uttar Pradesh Assembly from Laksar (1st term): Member, Committee on Petition |
| 1977–1980 | Elected to 7th Uttar Pradesh Assembly from Laksar (2nd term): Minister of State for Jail (1978–79); Minister of State for Forest (1979–80) |
| 1980–1985 | Elected to 8th Uttar Pradesh Assembly from Laksar (3rd term): Member, Committee on Government Assurance; Member, Urdu Academy (1981–85) |
| 1985–1989 | Elected to 9th Uttar Pradesh Assembly from Roorkee (4th term) |
| 1989–1991 | Elected to 10th Uttar Pradesh Assembly from Laksar (5th term) |
| 1996–2000 | Elected to 13th Uttar Pradesh Assembly from Laksar (6th term): Cabinet Minister For Jail, Political Pension and Forest (Mar 1997 to Oct 1997) |
| 2000–2002 | Member of Interim Uttaranchal Assembly from Laksar: Pro tem Speaker, Uttarakhand Legislative Assembly |
