= Yashveer Singh (Uttarakhand politician) =

Indian politician

Choudhary Yashveer Singh

Member of the Legislative Assembly, Uttaakhand
- In office 2002–2012
- Constituency: Iqbalpur

Personal details
- Party: Bhartiya Janata Party
- Other political affiliations: Bahujan Samaj Party

Choudhary Yashveer Singh is an Indian politician and former member of the Uttarakhand Legislative Assembly. He won elections to the Uttarakhand legislative assembly in 2002 and 2007, representing the Iqbalpur Assembly constituency as a member of the Bahujan Samaj Party. He joined the BJP in 2019.
