= Balawali =

Balawali Balawali Railway Station
- Village
- Location in Uttar Pradesh, India Balawali (India)
- Coordinates: 29.6278217°N 78.1127863°E
- Country: India
- State: Uttar Pradesh
- District: Bijnor District
- Elevation: 244 m (801 ft)

Languages
  - Official: Hindi
- Time zone: UTC+5:30 (IST)
- Nearest city: Bijnor

Balawali is a small village in Bijnor district in the Indian state of Uttar Pradesh near Railway Bridge on Ganga River. Balawali is a Railway Station also with code (BLW).

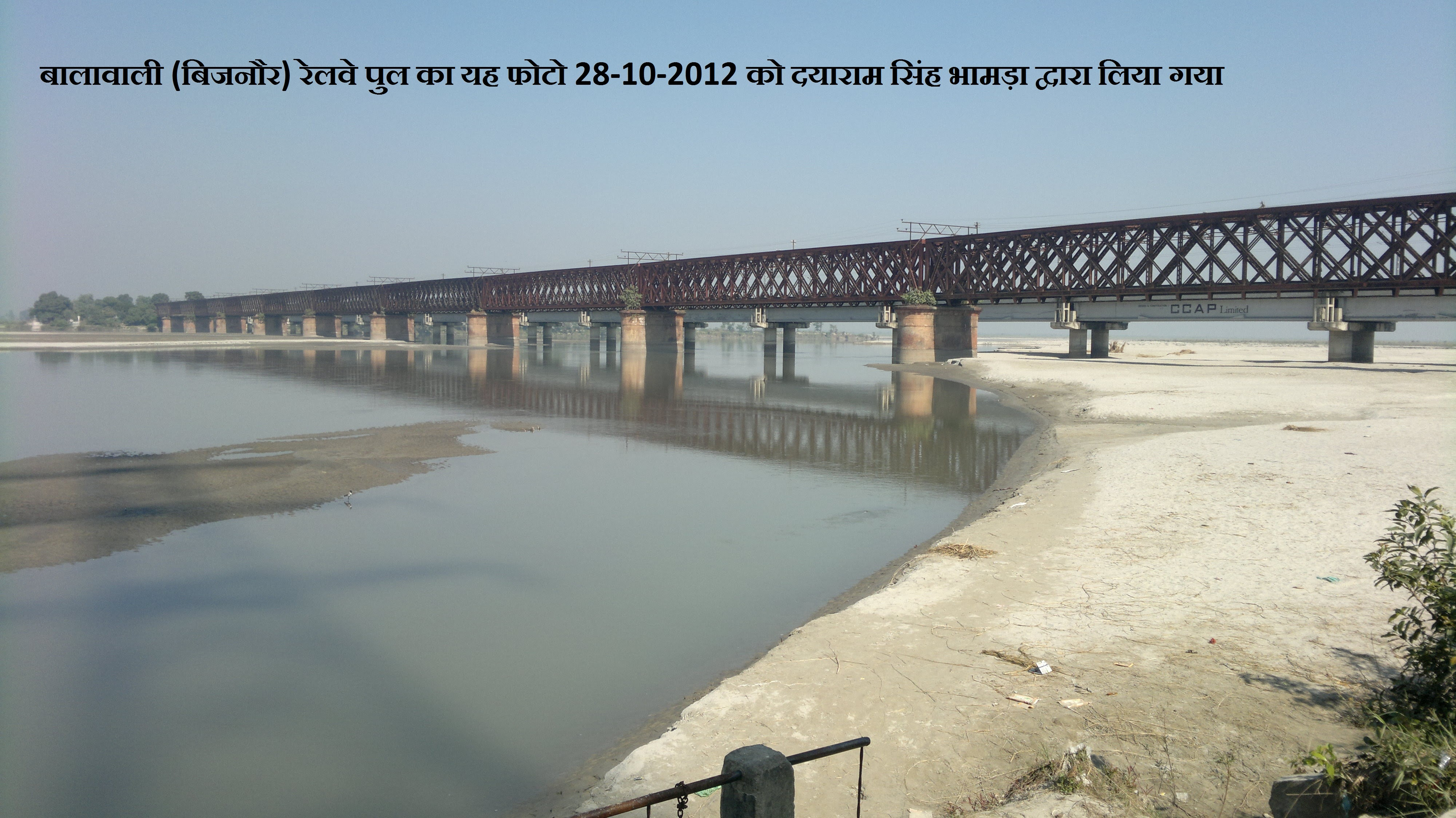
Balawali Railway Bridge on Ganga river

== Anderson Railway Bridge ==
The 1,000 metres (1.0 km) long Old bridge of Iron was constructed in 1888 in the British period at a cost of 27 Lakh 94 thousand rupees on the Ganga in Balawali. The Bridge was made under the guidance of Engineer Sir Jason Anderson & hence was named Anderson Bridge. This iron rail bridge used to operate rail traffic, but in the year 2001 the railway bridge was closed due to the new bridges being built nearby. Trains are still operating from the new bridge.

The 128 year old railway bridge was made ready for road traffic movement from the year 2016. The new Railway Bridge i.e. 961 metres (0.961 km) was built across the holy river Ganga near Balawali railway station between the Laksar and Najibabad Railway route in Uttar Pradesh. This Railway bridge is a landmark of the UP and Uttarakhand border. The Old Railway Bridge is used for road transportation and the other New Bridge for road transportation is under construction.

The 1,000 metres (1.0 km) long Old Anderson Bridge was the second railway bridge on the main Ganga River after the 1,050 metres (1.05 km) long Malviya Bridge at Varanasi and the first bridge on Ganga River upstream.
