= Dadanpur =

- Village
- Location within Haryana Location within India
- Coordinates: 28°30′19″N 76°39′39″E
- Country: India
- State: Haryana
- District: Jhajjar
- Time zone: UTC+05:30 (IST)
- Pincode: 124103

Dadanpur is a village in Jhajjar District, Haryana state, northern India. Joginder is the sarpanch of the village. The main castes are Jat, Brahmin, Kumhar, Chude, and Chamar. The main gotra are Beniwal, Gulia, Phogat, and Badesara. The main languages are used in this village are Hindi and Haryanvi. The nearest railway station is Machrauli. The village is 13 km (8.1 mi) from Jhajjar and 35 km (22 mi) from Rewari.Dadanpur is also known because of Sachin Mahal, it is the gangster of Delhi.
