= Suresh Chand Jain =

Indian politician

Member of the Uttarakhand Legislative Assembly
- In office 2002–2012
- Succeeded by: Pradip Batra
- Constituency: Roorkee

Personal details
- Party: Bharatiya Janata Party

Suresh Chand Jain is an Indian politician and member of the Bharatiya Janata Party. Jain was a member of the Uttarakhand Legislative Assembly from the Roorkee constituency in Haridwar district.

== Electoral performance ==
Election	Constituency	Party	Result	Votes %	Opposition Candidate	Opposition Party	Opposition vote %	Ref
2017	Roorkee	INC	Lost	37.87%	Pradip Batra	BJP	55.16%	
2012	Roorkee	BJP	Lost	36.44%	Pradip Batra	INC	37.74%	
2007	Roorkee	BJP	Won	41.82%	Furkan Ahmed	INC	32.14%	
2002	Roorkee	BJP	Won	34.19%	Manohar Lal Sharma	INC	26.34%	
