= Sarsawa =

- Town
- Location in Uttar Pradesh, India Sarsawa (India)
- Coordinates: 30.016°N 77.400°E
- Country: India
- State: Uttar Pradesh
- District: Saharanpur

Population (2011)
  - Total: 18,956

Languages
  - Official: Hindi
- Time zone: UTC+5:30 (IST)
- PIN: 247232
- Area code: 01331
- Vehicle registration: UP-11
- Airport: Sarsawa Airport
- Website: up.gov.in

Sarsawa is a town at the border of Haryana and a municipal board in Saharanpur district in the Indian state of Uttar Pradesh.

Sarsawa is a Nagar Palika Parishad town in Nakur tehsil district of Saharanpur, Uttar Pradesh. The Sarsawa city is divided into 25 wards for which elections are held every 5 years. The Sarsawa Nagar Palika Parishad has population of 18,956 of which 10,076 are males while 8,880 are females as per report released by Census India 2011.

== Nearest cities ==
- Saharanpur
- Yamunanagar
- Chandigarh
- Dehradun
- Haridwar
- Roorkee
- New Delhi
- Ambala
- Muzzafarnagar
- Meerut

== Demographics ==
Religions in Sarsawa
Religion	Percent
Hinduism	59.98%
Islam	37.04%
Others	2.97%

At the 2011 Census of India, the population of children with age of 0–6 is 2466 which is 13.01% of total population of Sarsawa (NPP). In Sarsawa Nagar Palika Parishad, the female sex ratio is 881 against state average of 912. Moreover, the child sex ratio in Sarsawa is around 820 compared to Uttar Pradesh state average of 902. The literacy rate of Sarsawa city is 79.40% higher than the state average of 67.68%. In Sarsawa, male literacy is around 85.21% while the female literacy rate is 72.88%.

Schedule Caste (SC) constitutes 16.41% while Schedule Tribe (ST) were 0.02% of total population in Sarsawa (NPP).

== Tourist attractions ==
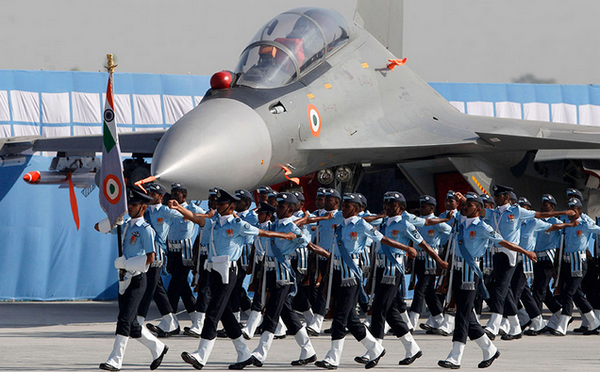
Air Force Day Celebration

- Airforce Station
- ARC
- Yamuna (5 km away)
- Shri bhankhandi mahadev temple
- Kot- Opposite of Moh.Mirdhan Sarsawa

== Transport ==
Sarsawa is located in the state of Uttar Pradesh in India, about 94.6mi (152km) north of New Delhi, the country's capital. Saharanpur Bus Stand provides interstate bus services to several cities of Uttar Pradesh, Uttarakhand, Haryana, Punjab and Delhi.

Jolly Grant Airport, Dehradun, and Chandigarh Airport, Chandigarh, are the nearest airports to Sarsawa, though Sarsawa Air Force Station is used for some VIP transport.

Sarsawa railway station situated on Moradabad–Ambala line having railway services to numerous major cities across the country.

== See also ==
- Sarsawa (Assembly constituency)
- Sarsawa Air Force Station
