= Nakur =

- Town
- Location within Uttar Pradesh Location within India
- Coordinates: 29°55′08″N 77°18′16″E
- Country: India
- State: Uttar Pradesh
- District: Saharanpur
- Elevation: 261 m (856 ft)

Population (2011)
  - Total: 22,712

Languages
  - Official: Hindi
- Time zone: UTC+5:30 (IST)
- PIN: 247342
- Vehicle registration: UP-11
- Website: up.gov.in

Nakur is a town, tehsil and a municipal board in Saharanpur district in the Indian state of Uttar Pradesh.

== Geography ==
Nakur is located at 29.92°N 77.30°E. It has an average elevation of 261 metres (856 feet). It is located 24 km from Saharanpur.

== History ==
It is the oldest tehsil. In mythology, it is said that Nakul from the Pandwas founded Nakur. It was done when the Mahabharat war was fought, and later people settled. There is a tree in Nakur, under which it is supposed that Nakul stayed. The tree is in a temple called "Mahadev Mandir".

Nakur has an important Pathan history. Pashtuns from Sher Shah Suri progeny made their home in Nakur. It was during the era of Ibrahim Khan Suri (grandfather of Sher Shah Suri) an adventurer from Roh, Afghanistan, who became the Jagirdar in Haryana that the Pashtuns flourished in the nearby areas. Today the progeny of great Sher Shah Suri empire has its niche in Nakur. The town has a glorious history of inter community relations.

Nakur is listed in the Ain-i-Akbari as a pargana under Saharanpur sarkar, producing a revenue of 1,387,070 dams for the imperial treasury and supplying a force of 300 infantry and 40 cavalry. The presence of Afghan and Brahmin communities in Nakur at the time are noted.

== Demographics ==
As of 2011 India census, Nakur had a population of 22,712. Males constitute 52.24% of the population and females 47.75%. Nakur has an average literacy rate of 72.78%, lower than the national average of 74.04%; male literacy is 80.03%, and female literacy is 64.92%. In Nakur, 13.83% of the population is under 6 years of age.

== Nakur Villages ==
Nakur is a tehsil and under this tehsil, these are the villages and area comes under this tehsil

- Alipura
- Saroorpur Gada
- Ahmedpur Brahman
- Khairpura
- Beedpur

== See also ==
- Nakur (Assembly constituency)
