= Sanjay Gupta (Uttarakhand politician) =

Indian politician

Sanjay Gupta is an Indian politician and member of the Bharatiya Janata Party. Gupta was a member of the Uttarakhand Legislative Assembly from the Laksar constituency in Haridwar district from 2012 to 2022. He won the 2012 Uttarakhand Legislative Assembly Elections and 2017 Uttarakhand Legislative Assembly Elections elections from Laksar Assembly constituency. He was defeated by BSP politician Muhammad Shahzad for the Laksar seat in the 2022 Uttarakhand Legislative Assembly Elections.
