= Moradabad–Ambala main line =

Railway line in India

Overview
- Status: Operational
- Owner: Indian Railways
- Locale: Gangetic Plain in Uttar Pradesh, Uttarakhand and Haryana
- Termini: Moradabad; Ambala

Service
- Operator: Northern Railway

History
- Opened: 1886

Technical
- Track length: 274 km (170 mi)
- Track gauge: 5 ft 6 in (1,676 mm) broad gauge
- Highest elevation: Moradabad 201 m (659 ft); Ambala Cantonment 272.530 m (894 ft)

The Moradabad–Ambala main line is a railway line connecting Moradabad in the Indian state of Uttar Pradesh and Ambala Cantonment in Haryana. The line is under the administrative jurisdiction of Northern Railway.

== History ==
The Scinde, Punjab & Delhi Railway completed the 483-kilometre-long (300 mi) Amritsar–Ambala–Saharanpur–Ghaziabad line in 1870 connecting Multan (now in Pakistan) with Delhi.

The Varanasi–Lucknow–Moradabad main line of Oudh and Rohilkhand Railway was extended to Saharanpur in 1886.

== Electrification ==
The Ambala–Saharanpur sector was electrified in 1996–98 and Saharanpur–Roorkee in 2003–04. The Roorkee–Mordabad sector was electrified around 2005–06.

The Ambala–Laksar–Moradabad sector is an electrified double-line.

== Sheds and workshops ==
Ambala has an outstation shed for Shakurbasti WDS-4 locos. Jagadhari has a carriage and wagon workshop and a bridge workshop.

== Speed limit ==
The Ambala Cantonment to moradabad jn line is classified as a "Group D " line and can take speeds up to 110 km/ h.

== Passenger movement ==
Moradabad and Ambala Cantonment on this line, are amongst the top hundred booking stations of Indian Railway.

== Railway reorganisation ==
Around 1872, the Indian Branch Railway Company was transformed into Oudh and Rohilkhand Railway. Oudh and Rohilkhand Railway was merged with East Indian Railway Company in 1925.

The Government of India took over the Bengal and North-Western Railway and merged it with the Rohilkhand and Kumaon Railway to form the Oudh and Tirhut Railway in 1943.

In 1952, Eastern Railway, Northern Railway and North Eastern Railway were formed. Eastern Railway was formed with a portion of East Indian Railway Company, east of Mughalsarai and Bengal Nagpur Railway. Northern Railway was formed with a portion of East Indian Railway Company west of Mughalsarai, Jodhpur Railway, Bikaner Railway and Eastern Punjab Railway. North Eastern Railway was formed with Oudh and Tirhut Railway, Assam Railway and a portion of Bombay, Baroda and Central India Railway. East Central Railway was created in 1996–97. North Central Railway was formed in 2003.
