= Saharanpur district =

Coordinates: 29°54′N 77°41′E

- District of Uttar Pradesh
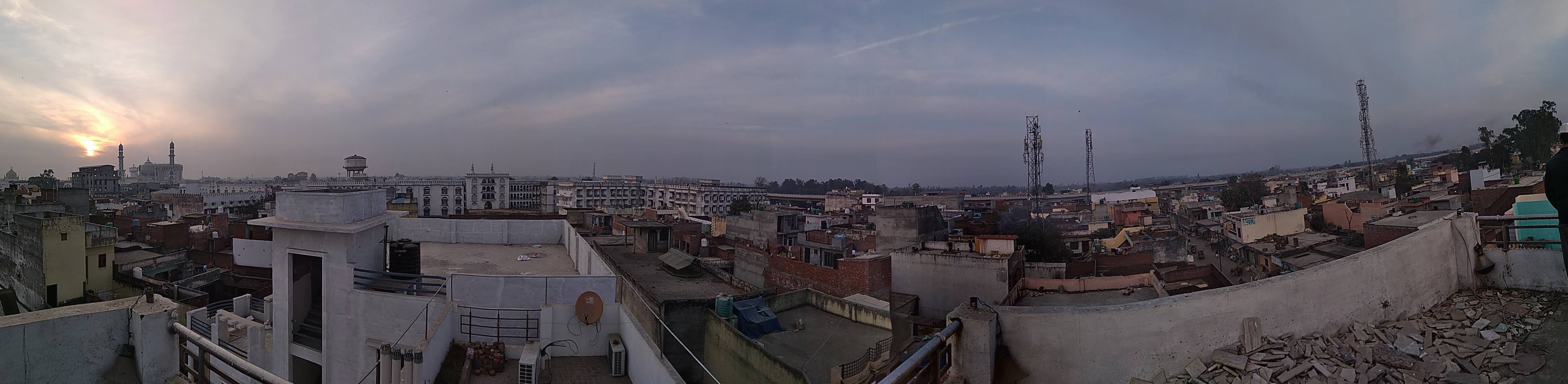
- Aerial view of deoband

- Location of Saharanpur district in Uttar Pradesh
- Country: India
- State: Uttar Pradesh
- Division: Saharanpur
- Headquarters: Saharanpur

Government
  - Lok Sabha constituencies: Saharanpur
  - Vidhan Sabha constituencies: Saharanpur, Saharanpur nagar, Gangoh, Nakur, Deoband, Rampur Maniharan, Behat

Area
  - Total: 3,860 km^{2} (1,490 sq mi)

Population (2011)
  - Total: 3,466,382
  - Density: 898/km^{2} (2,330/sq mi)

Demographics
  - Literacy: 62.61%
- Time zone: UTC+05:30 (IST)
- Vehicle registration: UP-11
- Airport: Sarsawa Airport
- Website: saharanpur.nic.in

Saharanpur district is the northernmost district of the Indian state of Uttar Pradesh. Bordering the states of Haryana, Himachal Pradesh and Uttarakhand, and close to the foothills of Shivalik Hills range, it lies in the northern part of the Upper Doab region.

The district headquarters are in Saharanpur, which is also the headquarters of Saharanpur Division.

== Historical ==
Historical population
Year	Pop.	±% p.a.
1901	728,601	—
1911	687,620	−0.58%
1921	653,460	−0.51%
1931	727,731	+1.08%
1941	822,231	+1.23%
1951	942,849	+1.38%
1961	1,132,537	+1.85%
1971	1,414,231	+2.25%
1981	1,821,543	+2.56%
1991	2,309,029	+2.40%
2001	2,896,863	+2.29%
2011	3,466,382	+1.81%

=== Medieval period ===
During the reign of Shamsu'd-Din Iltutmish (r 1211–1236), the region became a part of the Delhi Sultanate. At that time, most of the area remained covered with forests and marshlands, through which the Paondhoi, Dhamola, and Ganda Nala rivers flowed. The climate was humid and malaria outbreaks were common. Muhammad bin Tughluq, the Sultan of Delhi (1325–1351), undertook a campaign in the northern doab to crush the rebellion of the Shivalik kings in 1340, when according to local tradition he learned of the presence of a sufi saint on the banks of the Paondhoi River. After visiting the sage, he ordered that henceforth this region would be known as 'Shah-Haroonpur', after the Sufi Saint Shah Haroon Chishti. The simple but well-preserved tomb of this saint is situated in the oldest quarter of Saharanpur city, between the Mali Gate/Bazar Dinanath and Halwai Hatta. By the end of the 14th century, the power of the Sultanate had declined and it was attacked by Emperor Timur (1336–1405) of Central Asia. Timur had marched through the Saharanpur region in 1399 to sack Delhi and people of the region fought his army unsuccessfully. A weakened Sultanate was later conquered by the Central Asian Mogul king Babur (1483–1531).

=== Mughal period ===
In the 16th century, Babur, a Timurid descendant of Timur and Genghis Khan from Fergana Valley (modern-day Uzbekistan), invaded across the Khyber Pass and founded the Mughal Empire, covering India, along with modern-day Afghanistan, Pakistan and Bangladesh

During the Mughal period, Akbar (1542–1605), Saharanpur became an administrative unit under the Province of Delhi. Akbar bestowed the feudal jagir of Saharanpur to the Mughal treasurer, Sah Ranveer Singh, a Hindu who laid the foundations of the present-day city on the site of an army cantonment. The nearest settlements at that time were Shekhpura and Malhipur. Saharanpur was a walled city, with four gates: the Sarai Gate, the Mali Gate, the Buria Gate, and the Lakhi Gate. The city was divided into the neighbourhoods named Nakhasa Bazar, Shah Behlol, Rani Bazar and Lakhi Gate. The ruins of Shah Ran Veer Singh's old fort can still be seen in the Chaudharian locality of Saharanpur, not far from the better known 'Bada-Imam-bada'. He also built a large Jain temple in Muhallah/Toli Chaundhariyan, it is now known as the 'Digamber-Jain Panchayati Mandir'.

=== The Sayyids and Rohillas ===
Mughal emperors Akbar and later Shah Jehan (1592–1666) bestowed the administrative pargana of Sarwat on Muslim Sayyid families. In 1633 one of them founded a city and named it and the surrounding region Muzaffarnagar, in honour of his father, Sayyid Muzaffar Ali Khan. The Sayyids ruled the area until the 1739 invasion by Nadir Shah. After his departure, anarchy prevailed across the entire doab with the region ruled or ravaged in succession by Jats. Taking advantage of this anarchy, the Rohillas took control of the entire trans-Gangetic region.

Ahmad Shah Durrani, the Afghan ruler who invaded Northwestern and Northern India in the 1750s, conferred the territory of Saharanpur as Jagir on Rohilla chief Najaf Khan, who assumed the title of Nawab Najeeb-ud-Daula and took up residence in Saharanpur in 1754,. He made Gaunsgarh his capital and tried to strengthen his position against Maratha Empire attacks by entering an alliance with the Hindu Gurjar chieftain Manohar Singh. In 1759, Najeeb-ud-Daula issued a Deed of Agreement handing over 550 villages to Manohar Singh, who became the Raja of Landaura.

=== Maratha period ===
In 1757, the Maratha army captured the Saharanpur region, which resulted in Najeeb-ud-Daula losing control of Saharanpur to the Maratha rulers Raghunath Rao and Malharao Holkar. The conflict between Rohillas and Marathas came to an end on 18 December 1788 with the arrest of Ghulam Qadir, the grandson of Najeeb-ud-Daula, who was defeated by the Maratha general Mahadaji Shinde. The most significant contribution of Nawab Ghulam Qadir to Saharanpur city is the Nawab Ganj area and the Ahmedabadi fortress therein, which still stands. The death of Ghulam Qadir put an end to the Rohilla administration in Saharanpur and it became the northernmost district of the Maratha Empire. Ghani Bahadur Banda was appointed its first Maratha governor. The Maratha Regime saw the construction of the Bhuteshwar Temple and Bagheshwar Temple in Saharanpur city. In 1803, following the Second Anglo-Maratha War, when the British East India Company defeated the Maratha Empire, Saharanpur came under its rule.

=== British colonial period (1803–1947 AD) ===
The East India Company made the district of Saharanpur part of its Bengal Presidency, and it was later transferred to the United Provinces of Agra and Oudh.

Saharanpur was the home to the first armed rebellion against British rule in what is now Uttar Pradesh. In 1813, there was a mass revolt by the Hindu Gujjars of Saharanpur against British rule, but it was quickly suppressed. In 1824, Raja Kunja Singh, formerly the taluqdar of Kunja near Roorkee, led an armed revolt against East India Company rule and established a quasi-independent state; however, after a fierce battle the rebellion was quashed. It was found later by the East India Company that the Gujjars of surrounding districts were about to come to the aid of Kunja Singh, but by then he had been defeated.

When India rebelled in 1857 against the foreign Company's occupation, now referred to as the First War of Indian Independence, the Saharanpur and the present-day Muzaffarnagar Districts were part of that uprising. The centre of freedom fighters' operations was Shamli, a small town in the Muzaffarnagar region which was liberated for some time. After the uprising failed, British retribution was severe. Death and destruction was particularly directed against the Muslims of the region, whom the British considered as the main instigators of the rebellion (even though Hindu Gurjars were the ones who had led the revolt ). When social reconstruction started, the cultural and political history of Muslims began to revolve around Deoband and Aligarh. Muhammad Qasim Nanautawi and Rashid Ahmad Gangohi, both proponents of the reformer Shah Waliullah's ideology for social and political rejuvenation, established a school in Deoband in 1867. It found popularity and global recognition as the Darul Uloom Deoband. Its founders' mission was twofold: to raise and spread a team of scholars able to awaken the religious and social consciousness of Muslims through peaceful methods and to make efforts, through them, to educate Muslims in their faith and culture; and to bring about a feeling of nationalism and national unity by promoting the concept of Hindu-Muslim unity and a united India. Muslim scholars in the city of Saharanpur were active supporters of this ideology and went on to establish the Mazahir Uloom theological seminary six months later.

== Demographics ==
Historical population
Year	Pop.	±% p.a.
1901	241,612	—
1911	264,297	+0.90%
1921	261,915	−0.09%
1931	311,227	+1.74%
1941	359,218	+1.44%
1951	397,342	+1.01%
1961	498,034	+2.28%
1971	643,086	+2.59%
1981	854,377	+2.88%
1991	1,101,171	+2.57%
2001	1,378,881	+2.27%
2011	1,734,495	+2.32%

According to the 2011 census the Saharanpur district had a population of 3,466,382, roughly equal to the nation of Panama or the US state of Connecticut. This gives it a ranking of 92nd in India (out of a total of 640). The district has a population density of 939 inhabitants per square kilometre (2,430/sq mi) . Its population growth rate over the decade 2001-2011 was 19.59%. Saharanpur has a sex ratio of 887 females for every 1000 males, and a literacy rate of 72.03%. 30.77% of the population lived in urban areas. Scheduled Castes and Scheduled Tribes make up 22.05% and 0.03% of the population respectively.

=== Religion ===
Religions in Saharanpur district (2011)
Religion	Percent
Hinduism	56.74%
Islam	41.95%
Sikhism	0.54%
Other or not stated	0.77%
Distribution of religions

Hinduism is followed by over 56% of people. Islam is the second-largest religion in the district with over 41.95% adherents. Sikhism is followed by 0.54% people. Hindus generally dominate rural areas while Muslims are majority in urban areas.

Tehsil	Hindus	Muslims	Others
Behat	47.79%	51.19%	1.03%
Saharanpur	51.35%	46.78%	1.87%
Nakur	60.00%	38.54%	1.46%
Deoband	59.80%	39.77%	0.43%
Rampur Maniharan	79.24%	20.19%	0.57%

=== Languages ===
Languages of Saharanpur district (2011)
1. Hindi (80.9%)
2. Urdu (18.6%)
3. Others (0.53%)

At the time of the 2011 Census of India, 80.90% of the population of the district spoke Hindi and 18.57% Urdu as their first language.

== Education ==
=== Medical College ===
- Shaikh-Ul-Hind Maulana Mahmood Hasan Medical College, a government medical college which provides healthcare for all citizens of the state and to train students. The present medical college is planned to have a 500-bed hospital with road access to the Saharanpur-Ambala National Highway.

== Villages ==
- Agwanhera
