= Mainpuri Lok Sabha constituency =

Lok Sabha Constituency in Uttar Pradesh, India

Coordinates: 27.22°N 79.03°E

Mainpuri UP-21
- Lok Sabha constituency
- Interactive Map Outlining Mainpuri Lok Sabha constituency

Constituency details
- Country: India
- Region: North India
- State: Uttar Pradesh
- Assembly constituencies: Mainpuri; Bhongaon; Kishni; Karhal; Jaswantnagar
- Established: 1952
- Total electors: 17,90,709
- Reservation: None

Member of Parliament
- 18th Lok Sabha
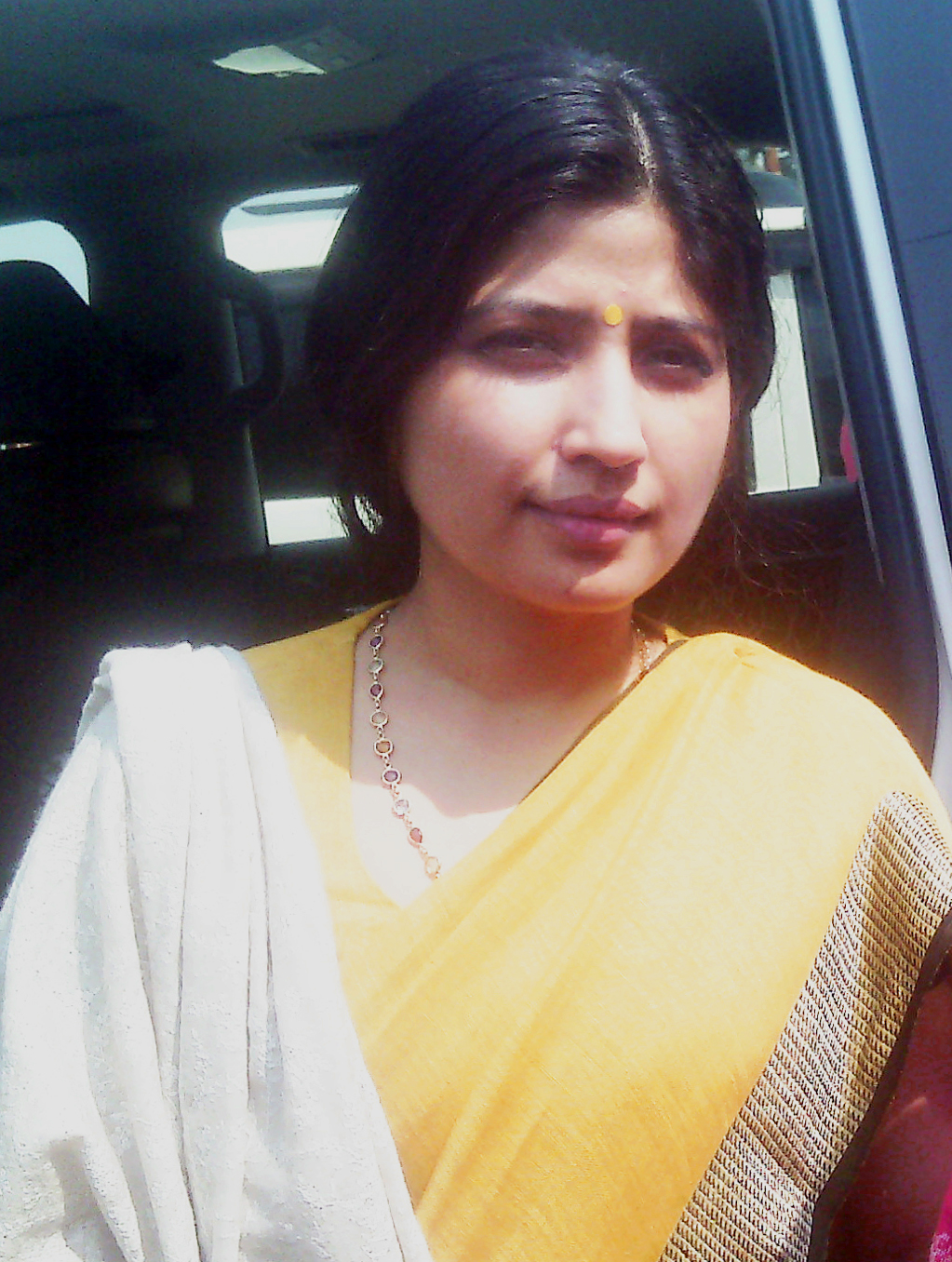
- Incumbent Dimple Yadav
- Party: Samajwadi Party
- Alliance: INDIA
- Elected year: 2024

Mainpuri Lok Sabha constituency (Hindi pronunciation: [mɛːn̪.pʊɾiː]) is one of the 80 Lok Sabha (parliamentary) constituencies in the Indian state of Uttar Pradesh.

== Assembly segments ==
Mainpuri constituency comprises five Vidhan Sabha (legislative assembly) segments. These are:

No	Name	District	Member	Party	2024 Lead
107	Mainpuri	Mainpuri	Jaiveer Singh	BJP	SP
108	Bhongaon	Mainpuri	Ram Naresh Agnihotri	BJP	SP
109	Kishni (SC)	Mainpuri	Brajesh Katheriya	SP	SP
110	Karhal	Mainpuri	Tej Pratap Singh Yadav	SP	SP
199	Jaswantnagar	Etawah	Shivpal Singh Yadav	SP	SP

In Mainpuri, 45% of the 1.73 million voters are Yadavs. The other dominant castes are Shakya, Brahmins, Scheduled Castes and Muslims.

== Members of Parliament ==
Samajwadi Party is the most successful political party in Mainpuri Lok Sabha elections.
1. SP (11 terms) (52.4%)
2. INC (5 terms) (23.8%)
3. JP (2 terms) (9.52%)
4. JP(S) (1 term) (4.76%)
5. JD (1 term) (4.76%)
6. PSP (1 term) (4.76%)

Year	Member	Party
1952	Badshah Gupta	Indian National Congress
1957	Bansi Das Dhangar	Praja Socialist Party
1962	Badshah Gupta	Indian National Congress
1967	Ch Maharaj Singh	Indian National Congress
1971	Ch Maharaj Singh	Indian National Congress
1977	Raghunath Singh Verma	Janata Party
1980	Raghunath Singh Verma	Janata Party (Secular)
1984	Balram Singh Yadav	Indian National Congress
1989	Uday Pratap Singh	Janata Dal
1991	Uday Pratap Singh	Janata Party
1996	Mulayam Singh Yadav	Samajwadi Party
1998	Balram Singh Yadav	Samajwadi Party
1999	Balram Singh Yadav	Samajwadi Party
2004	Mulayam Singh Yadav	Samajwadi Party
2004^	Dharmendra Yadav	Samajwadi Party
2009	Mulayam Singh Yadav	Samajwadi Party
2014	Mulayam Singh Yadav	Samajwadi Party
2014^	Tej Pratap Singh Yadav	Samajwadi Party
2019	Mulayam Singh Yadav	Samajwadi Party
2022^	Dimple Yadav	Samajwadi Party
2024	Dimple Yadav	Samajwadi Party

^ By-poll

== Election results ==
Vote share of Winning candidates
2024	56.79%
2022 (By-Poll)	64.08%
2019	53.75%
2014 (By-Poll)	64.46%
2014	59.63%
2009	56.44%
2004 (By-Poll)	62.64%
2004	63.96%
1998	41.69%
1996	42.77%
1991	29.40%
1989	53.53%
1984	50.09%
1980	47.84%
1977	78.60%
1971	49.98%
1967	26.42%
1962	21.93%
1957	30.45%
1952	44.30%

=== 2024 ===
2024 Indian General Elections: Mainpuri
Party	Candidate	Votes	%	±%
SP	Dimple Yadav	598,526	56.79	▼7.29
BJP	Jaiveer Singh	3,76,887	35.76	▲1.58
BSP	Shiv Prasad Yadav	66,814	6.34	▲6.34
NOTA	None of the Above	4570	0.43	▼0.21
Majority		2,21,639	21.03	▼8.87
Turnout		10,54,011	58.86	▲3.74
SP hold		Swing		

=== 2022 by-election ===
Bye Election, 2022: Mainpuri
Party	Candidate	Votes	%	±%
SP	Dimple Yadav	618,120	64.08	▲10.33
BJP	Raghuraj Singh Shakya	3,29,659	34.18	▼9.91
NOTA	None of the Above	6,121	0.64	▼0.05
Majority		2,88,461	29.90	+20.24
Turnout		9,64,842	55.12	
SP hold		Swing	+10.33	

=== 2019 ===
2019 Indian general elections: Mainpuri
Party	Candidate	Votes	%	±%
SP	Mulayam Singh Yadav	524,926	53.75	−10.71
BJP	Prem Singh Shakya	4,30,537	44.09	+11.30
IND.	Savendra Singh	2,631	0.27	N/A
NOTA	None of the Above	6,711	0.69	+0.03
Majority		94,389	9.66	−22.01
Turnout		9,78,261	56.77	−4.55
SP hold		Swing	-10.71	

=== 2014 by-election ===
By Elections, 2014: Mainpuri
Party	Candidate	Votes	%	±%
SP	Tej Pratap Singh Yadav	653,786	64.46	+5.25
BJP	Prem Singh Shakya	3,32,537	32.79	+9.86
RSMD	A. K. Shakya	5,587	0.55	
Independent	Kunj Bihari	4,394	0.44	
Independent	Muttalib gour	2,524	0.25	
NOTA	None of the above	6,636	0.66	+0.03
Majority		3,21,249	31.67	−4.83
Turnout		10,14,232	61.33	+0.87
SP hold		Swing	+5.25	

=== 2014 ===
2014 Indian general elections: Mainpuri
Party	Candidate	Votes	%	±%
SP	Mulayam Singh Yadav	595,918	59.63	
BJP	Shatrughan Singh Chauhan	2,31,252	23.14	
BSP	Dr. Sanghmitra Maurya	1,42,833	14.29	
Independent	Alok Nandan	5,645	0.56	
AAP	Baba Hardev Singh	5,323	0.55	
NOTA	None of the above	6,323	0.63	
Majority		3,64,666	36.49	
Turnout		9,99,427	60.46	
SP hold		Swing		

=== 2009 ===
2009 Indian general elections: Mainpuri
Party	Candidate	Votes	%	±%
SP	Mulayam Singh Yadav	392,308	56.44	−7.00
BSP	Vinay Shakya	2,19,239	31.54	+14.51
BJP	Tripti Shakya	56,265	8.10	–7.34
Independent	Sachchida Nand	7,756	1.12	
CPI	Hakim Singh Yadav	4,168	0.60	
Majority		1,73,069	24.90	
Turnout		6,95,032	49.67	
SP hold		Swing		

=== 2004 by-election ===
By Elections, 2004: Mainpuri
Party	Candidate	Votes	%	±%
SP	Dharmendra Yadav	348,999	62.64	
BSP	Ashok Shakya	1,69,286	30.39	
BJP	Ram Babu Kushwaha	14,544	2.61	
INC	Suman Chauhan	11,391	2.04	
Independent	Surendra Singh	4,746	0.85	
Majority		1,79,713	32.25	
Turnout		5,57,114	45.98	
SP hold		Swing		

=== 2004 ===
2004 Indian general elections: Mainpuri
Party	Candidate	Votes	%	±%
SP	Mulayam Singh Yadav	460,470	63.96	
BSP	Ashok Shakya	1,22,600	17.03	
BJP	Balram Singh Yadav	1,11,153	15.44	
INC	Thakur Rajendra Singh Jadon	9,896	1.37	−7.86
Majority		3,37,870	46.93	
Turnout		7,19,918	59.45	
SP hold		Swing		

=== 1998 ===
1998 Indian general election: Mainpuri
Party	Candidate	Votes	%	±%
SP	Balram Singh Yadav	264,734	41.69	
BJP	Ashok Yadav	254,368	40.06	
BSP	Hari Ram Shakya	73,680	11.60	
IND	Krishna Pratap	12,862	2.03	
IND	Kripal Singh	8,934	1.41	
INC	Shivnath Singh Dixit	6,699	1.06	
AD	Amar Pal Singh Baghel	5,743	0.90	
IND	Chandrabhan Singh	2,696	0.42	
BVP	Ram Naresh Shakya	1,248	0.20	
IND	Avdhesh	775	0.12	
IND	Kishan Singh	752	0.12	
IND	Ajay Kumar	546	0.09	
IND	Pradeep Kumar	416	0.07	
IND	Atar Singh	410	0.06	
IND	Mitthu Lal	409	0.06	
IND	Pravesh Kumar	255	0.04	
IND	Shishu Pal Singh	231	0.04	
IND	Bharat Singh	204	0.03	
Majority		10,366	1.63	
Turnout		648,244	59.34	
SP hold		Swing		

=== 1996 ===
1996 Indian general election: Mainpuri
Party	Candidate	Votes	%	±%
SP	Mulayam Singh Yadav	273,303	42.77	
BJP	Updesh Singh Chauhan	2,21,345	34.64	
BSP	Bhagwat Das Shakya	1,02,785	16.08	
INC	Kishan Chand	14,993	2.35	
Independent	Shiv Raj	4,509	0.71	
Majority		51,958	8.13	
Turnout		6,39,072	58.33	
SP gain from JP		Swing		

=== 1991 ===
1991 Indian general election: Mainpuri
Party	Candidate	Votes	%	±%
JP	Udai Pratap Singh	126,463	29.40	
BJP	Ram Naresh Agnihotri	114,298	26.57	
INC	Krishna Chandra Yadav	93,159	21.66	
JD	Shivraj Singh Yadav	52,839	12.28	
BSP	Ved Ram Sagar	31,590	7.34	
DDP	Ram Baksh Singh Pathor	1,861	0.43	
IND	Shokin Singh Yadav	1,748	0.41	
IND	Satya Prakash	1,731	0.40	
IND	Om Prakash	1,543	0.36	
IND	Alok	1,482	0.34	
IND	Bhisham Singh Rajput	1,467	0.34	
IND	Sudhir Kumar	1,091	0.25	
IND	Ram Kumar	850	0.20	
Majority		12,165	2.83	
Turnout		445,269	50.74	
Swing to JP from JD		Swing		

=== 1989 ===
1989 Indian general election: Mainpuri
Party	Candidate	Votes	%	±%
JD	Udai Pratap Singh	239,660	53.53	
INC	Krishna Chandra Yadav	155,369	34.70	
BSP	Baba Ram Nath Singh	22,973	5.13	
JP	Girja Shanker	14,348	3.20	
IND	Krishna Singh Yadav	9,984	2.23	
DDP	Indraj	4,256	0.95	
IND	Santosh Kumar Singh Chauhan	1,122	0.25	
Majority		84,291	18.83	
Turnout		460,814	54.15	
Swing to JD from INC		Swing		

=== 1984 ===
1984 Indian general election: Mainpuri
Party	Candidate	Votes	%	±%
INC	Balram Singh Yadav	214,322	50.09	
LKD	Ravindra Singh Chauhan	159,314	37.24	
JP	Raghunath Singh Verma	30,763	7.19	
IND	Mahesh Chandra	5,685	1.33	
DDP	Jawala	5,195	1.21	
IND	Mahesh Kumar	4,255	0.99	
IND	Girja Shankar	1,874	0.44	
IND	Jitendra Singh	1,851	0.43	
IND	Jagdish	1,315	0.31	
IND	Girraj Krishan Das	1,245	0.29	
IND	Gajendra Singh	1,089	0.25	
IND	Santosh Singh Chauhan	947	0.22	
Majority		55,008	12.85	
Turnout		435,670	61.53	
Swing to INC from JP(S)		Swing		

=== 1980 ===
1980 Indian general election: Mainpuri
Party	Candidate	Votes	%	±%
JP(S)	Raghunath Singh Verma	167,344	47.84	
INC(U)	Sheo Baksh Singh Rathore	84,128	24.05	
INC(I)	Maharaj Singh	48,202	13.78	
JP	Gauri Shanker Yadav	44,814	12.81	
IND	Manik Chandra	2,687	0.77	
IND	Jang Bahadur Singh	2,644	0.76	
Majority		83,216	23.79	
Turnout		356,277	54.24	
Swing to JP(S) from JP		Swing		

=== 1977 ===
1977 Indian general election: Mainpuri
Party	Candidate	Votes	%	±%
JP	Raghunath Singh Verma	289,426	78.60	
INC	Maharaj Singh	64,304	17.46	
IND	Babu Khan	7,366	2.00	
IND	Girija Shanker	7,127	1.94	
Majority		225,122	61.14	
Turnout		374,342	62.03	
Swing to JP from INC		Swing		

=== 1971 ===
1971 Indian general election: Mainpuri
Party	Candidate	Votes	%	±%
INC	Maharaj Singh	102,981	49.98	
INC(O)	Badshah Gupta	33,618	16.31	
BKD	Virendra Pati	29,702	14.41	
CPI	Lallu Singh	16,985	8.24	
IND	Hukum Singh	9,041	4.39	
IND	Bhanwar Singh	8,167	3.96	
IND	Layaq Singh	2,389	1.16	
IND	Ram Singh	2,109	1.02	
IND	Jaideo Singh	1,069	0.52	
Majority		69,363	33.67	
Turnout		209,587	39.36	
INC hold		Swing		

=== 1967 ===
1967 Indian general election: Mainpuri
Party	Candidate	Votes	%	±%
INC	M. Singh	74,952	26.42	
ABJS	P. S. Chauhan	44,864	15.82	
CPI(M)	R. Nath	43,877	15.47	
SWA	V. Yadav	36,397	12.83	
RPI	K. Chandra	28,333	9.99	
IND	R. S. Yadav	16,884	5.95	
IND	R. Singh	9,605	3.39	
IND	F. Singh	7,989	2.82	
IND	M. Singh	7,904	2.79	
IND	J. R. Bhardwaj	4,981	1.76	
SSP	S. K. Dixit	3,952	1.39	
IND	B. D. Dhangar	3,925	1.38	
Majority		30,088	10.60	
Turnout		296,665	59.47	
INC hold		Swing		

=== 1962 ===
1962 Indian general election: Mainpuri
Party	Candidate	Votes	%	±%
INC	Badshah Gupta	52,328	21.93	
CPI	Ram Nath	51,524	21.60	
SWA	Jagdish Singh	36,331	15.23	
RPI	Brij Pal Singh Nim	32,048	13.43	
PSP	Vishnu Dayal	31,186	13.07	
ABJS	Janki Prasad	22,708	9.52	
IND	Lala Ram Yadav	7,213	3.02	
IND	Amiri Lal	5,240	2.20	
Majority		804	0.33	
Turnout		248,294	58.55	
Swing to INC from PSP		Swing		

=== 1957 ===
1957 Indian general election: Mainpuri
Party	Candidate	Votes	%	±%
PSP	Bansi Das Dhangar	59,902	30.45	
INC	Badshah	56,072	28.50	
ABJS	Jagdish Singh	46,627	23.70	
IND	Mani Ram	17,972	9.13	
IND	Puttoo Singh	16,177	8.22	
IND	Shanker Lal	0	0.00	
Majority		3,830	1.95	
Turnout		196,750	50.04	
Swing to PSP from INC		Swing		

=== 1952 ===
1952 Indian general election: Mainpuri District (East)
Party	Candidate	Votes	%	±%
INC	Badshah Gupta	61,736	44.30	
ABJS	Raghuber Sahai	23,265	16.70	
IND	Narsingh Datt Sharma	20,787	14.92	
RSP	Putto Singh	19,722	14.15	
Socialist	Sri Krishna	13,835	9.93	
Majority		38,471	27.60	
Turnout		139,345	40.97	
INC win (new seat)				

== See also ==
- Mainpuri district
- List of constituencies of the Lok Sabha
