= Maharaj Singh =

Indian politician

Member of Parliament, Lok Sabha
- In office 1967-1977
- Preceded by: Badshah Gupta
- Succeeded by: Raghunath Singh Verma
- Constituency: Mainpuri, Uttar Pradesh

Personal details
- Party: Indian National Congress

Maharaj Singh was an Indian politician. He was elected to the Lok Sabha, the lower house of the Parliament of India from the Mainpuri constituency of Uttar Pradesh as a member of the Indian National Congress.
