= Ansar Ahmad (Indian politician) =

Indian politician from Uttar Pradesh

Minister of State Animal Husbandry and Live stock Government of Uttar Pradesh
- In office 2003–2007
- Chief Minister: Mulayam Singh Yadav
- Constituency: Nawabganj

Member of Uttar Pradesh Legislative Assembly
- In office 2012–2017
- Preceded by: Vikramjeet Maurya
- Succeeded by: Guru Prasad Maurya
- Constituency: Phaphamau

Member of Uttar Pradesh Legislative Assembly

Assembly Member for Nawabganj
- In office February 2002 – March 2007
- Preceded by: Vikramjeet Maurya
- Succeeded by: Guru Prasad Maurya

Personal details
- Born: 1955 (age 70–71) Chandapur Majara Morahu Phaphamau Prayagraj, Uttar Pradesh
- Party: Samajwadi Party
- Spouse: Shahnoor Begum
- Parent: Nawab Ali

Ansar Ahmad (born 16 August 1957) is an Indian politician from Allahabad, Uttar Pradesh. He is also known as Ansar Ahmad Pahelwan. He was Minister of State for Livestock under Mulayam Singh Yadav led Government of Uttar Pradesh from 2003 to 2007. He has been twice Member of the Legislative Assembly from Nawabganj/Phaphamau in Prayagraj. He won the Assembly elections of 2002 and the 2012 Uttar Pradesh Vidhan Sabha Elections. He is a member of the Samajwadi Party.
