= Uday Pratap Singh =

Indian politician

Member of Parliament, Rajya Sabha
- In office 2002 – 2008
- Constituency: Uttar Pradesh

Member of Parliament, Lok Sabha
- In office 1989 – 1996
- Preceded by: Balram Singh Yadav
- Succeeded by: Mulayam Singh Yadav
- Constituency: Mainpuri

Personal details
- Born: May 18, 1932 (age 94)
- Party: Samajwadi Party

Uday Pratap Singh (born 18 May 1932) is an Indian politician of the Samajwadi Party in India who represented the state of Uttar Pradesh in the Rajya Sabha between 2002 and 2008. He was a member of the Lok Sabha from 1989–1996.

== Early life and family ==
Singh was born on 18 May 1932 to Harihar Singh Chaudhary and Puspa Yadav at Garhiya in what is now Mainpuri district, Uttar Pradesh. His family were comfortably-off civil servants. After obtaining MA degrees in English and in Hindi from St. John's College, Agra University, he became an English lecturer the Jain Inter-College, Karhal in 1958. There he taught the future leader of the Samajwadi Party, Mulayam Singh Yadav. He married Chaitanya Yadav on 20 May 1958 and has a son and three daughters. His wife predeceased him. His Son Dr.Asim Yadav Who is, a close aide of Akhilesh Yadav has won Legislative Council Election On Samajwadi Party Ticket in 2015 From Agra Graduate Zone.

== Career ==
Singh has been a member of the Janata Dal political party (1989–91), the Samajwadi Janata Party (1991–92) and, since 1992, the Samajwadi Party. He was elected as a member of the Ninth (1989–91) and Tenth Lok Sabhas (1991-1996) was a member of the National Commission for Backward Classes, a department of the Government of India from November 2002. His elections were from the Mainpuri constituency, which he subsequently gave up in 1996 to allow his friend and former pupil, Mulayam Singh Yadav, to stand.

Singh was elected to the Rajya Sabha in January 2003 and retired on 25 November 2008. Aside from various parliamentary committees, he has also been a member of educational bodies, including the board of management of Babasaheb Bhimrao Ambedkar University, a position to which he was appointed in 2006. Following the appointment of Akhilesh Yadav, the son of Mulayam, as Chief Minister of Uttar Pradesh, he was given a ministerial portfolio. Subsequently, in early 2017, it was suggested that Singh was siding with Akhilesh during a Yadav family squabble for control of the Samajwadi Party in which he was pitted against his father.

Singh is interested in Hindi poetry and promotion of Indian languages generally. Himself a Hindi poet, he has attended kavi sammelans both in India and elsewhere. He has composed election songs for the Samajwadi Party and paeans to its leader, Mulayam Singh Yadav. He is the chairperson of Uttar Pradesh Hindi Sansthaan and has been recognised with a Sahitya Shiromani award. He has been the National President of the All India Yadav Mahasabha
