= Hemlata Chaudhary =

Indian politician

Honourable Hemlata Chaudhary

MLA, 16th Legislative Assembly
- In office Mar 2012 – Mar 2017
- Preceded by: Kaukab Hameed Khan
- Succeeded by: Yogesh Dhama
- Constituency: Bagpat

Personal details
- Born: 30 December 1969 (age 56) Meerut, Uttar Pradesh, India
- Party: Bahujan Samaj Party
- Spouse: Prashant Chaudhary (husband)
- Children: 2 sons & 1 daughter
- Parent: Indradev Singh (father)
- Education: Chaudhary Charan Singh University
- Profession: Politician

Hemlata Chaudhary (born 30 December 1969) is an Indian politician and a member of the 16th Legislative Assembly of Uttar Pradesh of India. She represents the Bagpat constituency of Uttar Pradesh and is a member of the Bahujan Samaj Party political party.

She had 20 crores as cash as per the nomination filing. The assets for her husband and family were not self declared by her.

== Early life and education ==
Hemlata Chaudhary was born in Meerut district, Uttar Pradesh in a Gurjar family. Her father Inder deo Singh is a Retd. Deputy Superintendent in Uttar Pradesh Police. She attended the Chaudhary Charan Singh University and attained Bachelor of Education & Master of Arts and currently studying Indian law. She has been a history teacher before joining politics.

== Political career ==
Hemlata Chaudhary is the wife of former Member of Legislative Council Prashant Chaudhary. She has been a MLA for one term. She represented the Bagpat constituency and is a member of the Bahujan Samaj Party political party.

== Posts held ==
#	From	To	Position	Comments
01	March 2012	March 2017	Member, 16th Legislative Assembly	

== See also ==
- Bagpat (Assembly constituency)
- Sixteenth Legislative Assembly of Uttar Pradesh
- Uttar Pradesh Legislative Assembly
