= 1996 Uttar Pradesh Legislative Assembly election =

1996 Uttar Pradesh legislative assembly election
- 30 September and 7 October 1996

All 425 seats of Uttar Pradesh Legislative Assembly 213 seats needed for a majority
- Turnout: 55.73% (▼1.40%)
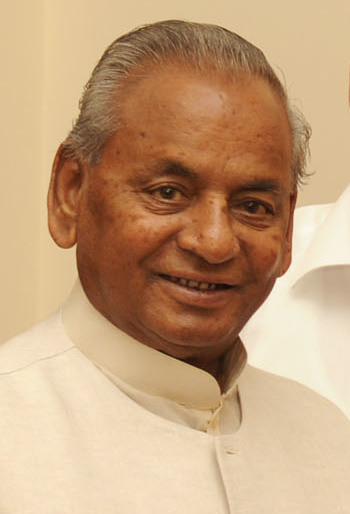

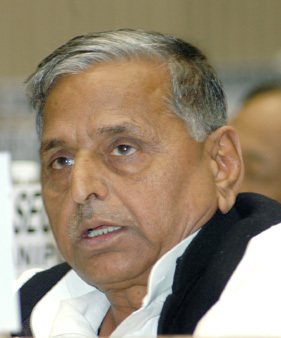

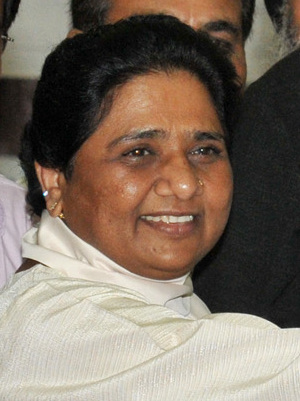
	Majority party	Minority party	Third party
Leader	Kalyan Singh	Mulayam Singh Yadav	Mayawati
Party	BJP	SP	BSP
Alliance	BJP+SAP	SP + JD+ AIIC(T)+ BKKP	BSP+INC
Leader's seat	Atrauli	Sahaswan	Bilsi; Harora; Sri Nagar
Last election	177	109	67
Seats won	174	110	67
Seat change	▼3	▲1	Steady
Popular vote	18,028,820	12,085,226	10,890,716
Percentage	32.52%	21.80%	19.64%
Swing	▼0.78%	▲3.86%	▲8.52%
Chief Minister before election
President's Rule
Elected Chief Minister
Mayawati
BSP

Legislative Assembly elections were held in Uttar Pradesh in 1996. The Bharatiya Janata Party remained the largest party, winning 174 of the 425 seats.

The Uttar Pradesh Legislative Assembly comprises a total of 426 seats, of which 425 are filled through elections, while one seat is filled through the nomination of an Anglo-Indian member.

Following imposition of President's Rule in UP in October 1995, elections for the 13th Uttar Pradesh Legislative Assembly were held in September–October 1996. Out of the total 425 seats to be filled through elections, polls were conducted for only 424 seats. The election in the Shikarpur constituency was postponed due to the death of a candidate. No coalition could muster majority for five months after the election. The deadlock was broken when Mayawati was sworn in as Chief Minister with BJP's support in March 1997. During this assembly's term, Kalyan Singh also served as a Chief Minister later.

In this election, Kalyan Singh of the Bharatiya Janata Party emerged victorious from two constituencies—Atrauli and Debai; but he subsequently resigned from the Dibai. Similarly, Mayawati of the Bahujan Samaj Party also secured victory from three constituencies—Bilsi, Sri Nagar and Harora; but she retained Harora. In addition to these, Mulayam Singh Yadav and Subhawati Devi of the Samajwadi Party also resigned from the Sahaswan and Maniram, respectively, as they chose to continue serving as members of the Lok Sabha. Therefore, only 420 seats of the 13th Legislative Assembly were filled, and five seats remained vacant after this election

On 17 April 1997, Peter Fanthome was nominated to the Anglo-Indian seat.

By-elections for the five aforementioned vacant seats of the Legislative Assembly were held on 8 February 1997. Subsequently, all 426 seats of the Legislative Assembly were filled. However, a seat in the House once again fell vacant due to the demise of Brahm Dutt Dwivedi, who had been elected to the Legislative Assembly from Farrukhabad from Bharatiya Janata Party. The by-election for this vacancy was conducted on 29 May 1997, as a result of which all 426 seats of the Uttar Pradesh Legislative Assembly were once again filled.

== Parties and alliances ==
=== Bharatiya Janata Party ===
Party	Flag	Symbol	Leader	Seats contested
Bharatiya Janata Party			Kalyan Singh	414
Samata Party			George Fernandes	9

=== Samajwadi Alliance ===
Party	Flag	Symbol	Leader	Seats contested
Samajwadi Party			Mulayam Singh Yadav	281
Janata Dal			Vishwanath Pratap Singh	45+9
Bharatiya Kisan Kamgar Party			Chaudhary Ajit Singh	33+5
All India Indira Congress (Tiwari)			Narayan Dutt Tiwari	34+3
Communist Party of India (Marxist)				11
Communist Party of India				11

=== BSP+Congress ===
Party	Flag	Symbol	Leader	Seats contested
Bahujan Samaj Party			Mayawati	296
Indian National Congress			Jitendra Prasad	126

== Result ==
=== Results by alliance and party ===
Party	BJP	SP	BSP	INC	IND	BKKP	JD	CPIM	AIICT	SP	CPI	SJPR
Seats	174	110	67	33	13	8	7	4	4	2	1	1
Alliance	BJP+			SP+			BSP+INC
Seats	176			134			100

Alliance	Party	Seats				Popular vote		
Alliance	Party	Contested	Won	FD	+/−	Votes	%	±pp
BJP+	Bharatiya Janata Party	414	174	13	▼3	18,028,820	32.52	▼0.78
BJP+	Samata Party	9	2	5	New entry	221,866	0.4	New entry
SP+	Samajwadi Party	281	110	19	▲1	12,085,226	21.8	▲3.86
SP+	Bharatiya Kisan Kamgar Party	38	8	17	New entry	1,065,730	1.92	New entry
SP+	Janata Dal	54	7	20	▼20	1,421,528	2.56	▼9.77
SP+	All India Indira Congress (Tiwari)	37	4	17	New entry	735,327	1.33	New entry
SP+	Communist Party of India (Marxist)	11	4	1	▲3	424,752	0.77	▲0.30
SP+	Communist Party of India	15	1	7	▼2	327,231	0.59	▼0.04
BSP+INC	Bahujan Samaj Party	296	67	28	Steady	10,890,716	19.64	▲8.52
BSP+INC	Indian National Congress	126	33	20	▲5	4,626,663	8.35	▼6.73
None	Samajwadi Janata Party (Rashtriya)	77	1	72	New entry	325,787	0.59	New entry
None	Independents	2031	13	1993	▲5	3,615,932	6.52	▼0.29
Valid votes		55,438,666	98.6					
Invalid votes		788,907	1.4					
Votes cast/ turnout		56,232,609	55.73					
Abstentions		46,087,653	44.27					
Registered voters		100,905,819	100					

== Government Formation ==
The elections led to a hung assembly, and a further period of President's rule, before the BJP and the BSP formed an alliance with the BJP, allowing Mayawati to become Chief Minister in March 1997. Kalyan Singh became Chief Minister of Uttar Pradesh for the second time in September 1997, taking the post over from Mayawati as part of their power-sharing agreement. In February 1998, his government withdrew cases against those accused in the Babri Masjid demolition, stating that a Ram temple would be built at the site if the BJP were to take power in Delhi.The BSP and BJP came into conflict over the policies that the BSP government had implemented targeting Dalit social welfare.On 21 October 1997 the BSP withdrew support for Singh's government.

Singh continued in office with the support of a breakaway faction of the BSP, and a breakaway faction of the INC, led by INC MLA Naresh Agrawal, the Akhil Bharatiya Loktantrik Congress. Singh's administration ended many of the BSP's Dalit-focused programmes soon after taking office.

On 21 February 1998, Singh's government was dismissed by the Governor of Uttar Pradesh, Romesh Bhandari, after Agrawal withdrew support to Singh's government. Bhandari invited Jagdambika Pal of the INC to form a new government, in which Agrawal became deputy chief minister.Bhandari's order was stayed by a division bench of the Allahabad High Court, which reinstated Singh's administration two days after its dismissal.

As a member of the Lodhi community, Singh commanded support among Other Backward Class (OBC) groups, and his affiliation with the BJP had allowed it to expand its support beyond its traditional upper-caste base. However, he began to be seen as a "patron of the backward castes" by upper-caste members of his own party, and to face opposition as a result. Dissension within the party occurred at the same time as an increase in crime that Singh's administration was unable to control, and in May 1999, 36 BJP legislators resigned in protest at the continuation of Singh's administration.The BJP's central administration replaced Singh as Chief Minister with Rajnath Singh.

== Elected members ==
Constituency	Reserved for (SC/ST/None)	Member	Party
Uttarkashi	SC	Gyan Chand	Bharatiya Janata Party
Tehri	None	Lakhiram Joshi	Bharatiya Janata Party
Deoprayag	None	Matbar Singh Kandari	Bharatiya Janata Party
Lansdowne	None	Bharat Singh Rawat	Bharatiya Janata Party
Pauri	None	Mohan Singh Rawat	Bharatiya Janata Party
Karanprayag	None	Ramesh Pokhariyal Nishank	Bharatiya Janata Party
Badrikedar	None	Kedar Singh Phonia	Bharatiya Janata Party
Didihat	None	Vishan Singh	Bharatiya Janata Party
Pithoragarh	None	Krishna Chandra Punetha	Bharatiya Janata Party
Almora	None	Raghunath Singh Chauhan	Bharatiya Janata Party
Bageshwar	SC	Narayan Ram Das	Bharatiya Janata Party
Ranikhet	None	Ajay Bhatt	Bharatiya Janata Party
Nainital	None	Banshidhar Bhagat	Bharatiya Janata Party
Khatima	None	Suresh Chandra Arya	Bharatiya Janata Party
Haldwani	None	Tilak Raj Behar	Bharatiya Janata Party
Kashipur	None	Karan Chand Singh Baba	All India Indira Congress
Seohara	None	Ved Prakash Singh	Bharatiya Janata Party
Dhampur	None	Mool Chand	Samajwadi Party
Afzalgarh	None	Indra Dev	Bharatiya Janata Party
Nagina	SC	Omwati Devi	Samajwadi Party
Nazibabad	SC	Ramswaroop Singh	Communist Party of India
Bijnor	None	Raja Gazaffar	Bahujan Samaj Party
Chandpur	None	Swami Omvesh	Independent
Kanth	None	Rajesh Kumar Urf Chunnu	Bharatiya Janata Party
Amroha	None	Mangal Singh	Bharatiya Janata Party
Hasanpur	None	Ch. Rifaqat Husain	Samajwadi Party
Gangeshwari	SC	Tota Ram	Bharatiya Janata Party
Sambhal	None	Iqbal Mehmood	Samajwadi Party
Bahjoi	None	Brijendra Pal Singh	Samajwadi Party
Chandausi	SC	Gulab Devi	Bharatiya Janata Party
Kundarki	None	Akbar Husain	Bahujan Samaj Party
Moradabad West	None	Jagat Pal Singh	Bharatiya Janata Party
Moradabad	None	Sandeep Agarwal	Bharatiya Janata Party
Moradabad Rural	None	Saulat Ali	Samajwadi Party
Thakurdwara	None	Sarvesh Kumar Urf Rakesh	Bharatiya Janata Party
Suartanda	None	Shiv Bahadur Saxena	Bharatiya Janata Party
Rampur	None	Afroz Ali Khan	Indian National Congress
Bilaspur	None	Kazim Ali Khan Alias Naved Mian	Indian National Congress
Shahabad	SC	Swami Parmanand Dandi	Samajwadi Party
Bisauli	None	Yogendra Kumar	Samajwadi Party
Gunnour	None	Ram Khiladi	Janata Dal
Sahaswan	None	Mulayam Singh Yadav	Samajwadi Party
Bilsi	SC	Mayawati	Bahujan Samaj Party
Budaun	None	Prem Swaroop Pathak	Bharatiya Janata Party
Usehat	None	Bhagwan Singh Shakya	Bahujan Samaj Party
Binawar	None	Ram Sevak Singh	Bharatiya Janata Party
Dataganj	None	Prem Pal Singh Yadav	Samajwadi Party
Aonla	None	Dharampal Singh	Bharatiya Janata Party
Sunha	None	Suman Lata Singh	Bharatiya Janata Party
Faridpur	SC	Nand Ram	Samajwadi Party
Bareilly Cantonment	None	Ashfaq Ahmad	Samajwadi Party
Bareilly City	None	Rajesh Agarwal	Bharatiya Janata Party
Nawabganj	None	Chhotey Lal Gangwar	Samajwadi Party
Bhojipura	None	Wahoran Lal Maurya	Bharatiya Janata Party
Kawar	None	Surendra Pratap Singh	Bharatiya Janata Party
Baheri	None	Harish Chandra Gangwar	Bharatiya Janata Party
Pilibhit	None	Raj Rai Singh	Bharatiya Janata Party
Barkhera	SC	Peetam Ram	Samajwadi Janata Party
Bisalpur	None	Anis Khan	Bahujan Samaj Party
Puranpur	None	Gopal Krishna	Samajwadi Party
Powayan	SC	Chet Ram	Indian National Congress
Nigohi	None	Kovid Kumar	Bharatiya Janata Party
Tilhar	None	Virendra Pratap Singh Alias "munna"	Indian National Congress
Jalalabad	None	Sharad Veer Singh	Samajwadi Party
Dadraul	None	Ram Autar Misra	Indian National Congress
Shahjahanpur	None	Suresh Kumar Khanna	Bharatiya Janata Party
Mohammadi	SC	Krishna Raj	Bharatiya Janata Party
Haiderabad	SC	Arvind Giri	Samajwadi Party
Paila	None	Moti Lal	Samajwadi Party
Lakhimpur	None	Kaushal Kishor	Samajwadi Party
Srinagar	None	Mayavati	Bahujan Samaj Party
Nighasan	None	Ram Kumar Verma	Bharatiya Janata Party
Dhaurehara	None	Saraswati Pratap Singh	Indian National Congress
Behta	None	Mahendra Kumar	Samajwadi Party
Biswan	None	Ajit Kumar Mehrotra	Bharatiya Janata Party
Mahmoodabad	None	Ammar Rizvi	Indian National Congress
Sidhauli	SC	Shyam Lal Rawat	Samajwadi Party
Laharpur	None	Buniyad Husain Ansari	Bahujan Samaj Party
Sitapur	None	Radhey Shyam Jaiswal	Samajwadi Party
Hargaon	SC	Ramesh Rahi	Samajwadi Party
Misrikh	None	Om Prakash Gupta	Samajwadi Party
Machhrehta	SC	Rampal Rajvanshi	Janata Dal
Beniganj	SC	Ram Pal Verma	Samajwadi Party
Sandila	None	Abdul Mannan	Bahujan Samaj Party
Ahirori	SC	Shyam Prakash	Bahujan Samaj Party
Hardoi	None	Naresh Chandra Agarwal	Indian National Congress
Bawan	SC	Chhote Lal	Bharatiya Janata Party
Pihani	None	Ashok Bajpai	Samajwadi Party
Shahabad	None	Baboo Khan	Samajwadi Party
Bilgram	None	Ganga Singh Chauhan	Bharatiya Janata Party
Mallawan	None	Dharmagya Misra	Samajwadi Party
Bangarmau	None	Ram Shankar Pal	Bahujan Samaj Party
Safipur	SC	Babu Lal	Bharatiya Janata Party
Unnao	None	Deepak Kumar	Samajwadi Party
Hadha	None	Ganga Bux Singh	Indian National Congress
Bhagwant Nagar	None	Kripa Shankar Singh	Bharatiya Janata Party
Purwa	None	Udai Raj	Samajwadi Party
Hasanganj	SC	Mast Ram	Bharatiya Janata Party
Malihabad	SC	Gauri Shankar	Samajwadi Party
Mohana	None	Gomti Yadav	Bharatiya Janata Party
Lucknow East	None	Vidya Sagar Gupta	Bharatiya Janata Party
Lucknow West	None	Lal Ji Tandon	Bharatiya Janata Party
Lucknow Central	None	Suresh Kumar Srivastava	Bharatiya Janata Party
Lucknow Cantonment	None	Suresh Chandra Tiwari	Bharatiya Janata Party
Sarojini Nagar	None	Shyam Kishore Yadav	Samajwadi Party
Mohanlalganj	SC	R. K. Chaudhary	Bahujan Samaj Party
Bachhrawan	SC	Shyam Sunder	Bahujan Samaj Party
Tiloi	None	Muslim	Samajwadi Party
Rae Bareli	None	Akhilesh Kumar Singh	Indian National Congress
Sataon	None	Shiv Ganesh Lodhi	Bahujan Samaj Party
Sareni	None	Ashok Kumar Singh	Samajwadi Party
Dalmau	None	Swami Prasad Maurya	Bahujan Samaj Party
Salon	SC	Dal Bahadur Kori	Bharatiya Janata Party
Kunda	None	Kunwar Raghuraj Pratap Singh Raja Bhaiya	Independent
Bihar	SC	Ramnath	Independent
Rampurkhas	None	Pramod Tiwari	Indian National Congress
Garwara	None	Rajaram	Janata Dal
Pratapgarh	None	Chandra Nath Singh	Samajwadi Party
Birapur	None	Shivakant	Bharatiya Janata Party
Patti	None	Rajendra Pratap Singh Alias Moti Singh	Bharatiya Janata Party
Amethi	None	Ram Harsh Singh	Indian National Congress
Gauriganj	None	Tej Bhan Singh	Bharatiya Janata Party
Jagdishpur	SC	Ram Lakhan	Bharatiya Janata Party
Isauli	None	Jai Narain Tiwari	Bahujan Samaj Party
Sultanpur	None	Surya Bhan	Bharatiya Janata Party
Jaisinghpur	None	Ram Ratan Yadav	Bahujan Samaj Party
Chanda	None	Arun Pratap Singh	Bharatiya Janata Party
Kadipur	SC	Kashi Nath	Bharatiya Janata Party
Katehari	None	Dharmraj Nishad	Bahujan Samaj Party
Akbarpur	None	Ram Achal Rajbhar	Bahujan Samaj Party
Jalalpur	None	Sher Bahadur	Bharatiya Janata Party
Jahangirganj	SC	Bheem Prasad	Samajwadi Party
Tanda	None	Lalji Verma	Bahujan Samaj Party
Ayodhya	None	Lallu Singh	Bharatiya Janata Party
Bikapur	None	Sita Ram Nishad	Samajwadi Party
Milkipur	None	Mitra Sen Yadav	Samajwadi Party
Sohawal	SC	Awdhesh Prasad	Samajwadi Party
Rudauli	None	Ramdev Acharya	Bharatiya Janata Party
Dariyabad	SC	Rajiv Kumar Singh	Bharatiya Janata Party
Siddhaur	None	Kamla Prasad Rawat	Samajwadi Party
Haidergarh	None	Surendra Nath	Indian National Congress
Masauli	None	Farid Mahfooz Kidwai	Bahujan Samaj Party
Nawabganj	None	Sangram Singh	Indian National Congress
Fatehpur	SC	Hardeo Singh	Samajwadi Party
Ramnagar	None	Sarvar Ali Khan	Samajwadi Party
Kaiserganj	None	Ram Tej Yadav	Samajwadi Party
Fakharpur	None	Arun Veer Singh	Samajwadi Party
Mahsi	None	Dilip Kumar	Samajwadi Party
Nanpara	None	Jata Shankar	Bharatiya Janata Party
Charda	SC	Shabbeer Ahmad	Samajwadi Party
Bhinga	None	Chandra Mani Kant Singh	Bharatiya Janata Party
Bahraich	None	Waqar Ahmad Shah	Samajwadi Party
Ikauna	SC	Akshaybar Lal	Bharatiya Janata Party
Gainsari	None	Bindu Lal	Bharatiya Janata Party
Tulsipur	None	Rizwan Jahir Urf Rijju Bhaiya	Bahujan Samaj Party
Balrampur	None	Vinai Kumar Pandey "binnu"	Indian National Congress
Utraula	None	Ubaidur Rahman	Samajwadi Party
Sadullah Nagar	None	Ram Pratap Singh	Bharatiya Janata Party
Mankapur	SC	Ram Vishun Azad	Samajwadi Party
Mujehna	None	Ram Pal Singh	Samajwadi Party
Gonda	None	Vinod Kumar Singh Urf Pandit Singh	Samajwadi Party
Katra Bazar	None	Bawan Singh	Bharatiya Janata Party
Colonelganj	None	Ajai Pratap Singh Urf Lalla Bhaiya	Bharatiya Janata Party
Dixir	SC	Ramapati Shashtri	Bharatiya Janata Party
Harraiya	None	Sukhpal Pandey	Bahujan Samaj Party
Captainganj	None	Ram Prasad Chaudhary	Bahujan Samaj Party
Nagar East	SC	Ved Prakash	Bahujan Samaj Party
Basti	None	Jagdambika Pal	All India Indira Congress
Ramnagar	None	Ram Lalit Chaudhary	Bahujan Samaj Party
Domariaganj	None	Taufiq Ahmad	Samajwadi Party
Itwa	None	Mohd. Mukeem	Independent
Shohratgarh	None	Ravindra Pratap Urf Pappu Chaudhary	Bharatiya Janata Party
Naugarh	None	Dhanraj Yadao	Bharatiya Janata Party
Bansi	None	Jai Pratap Singh	Bharatiya Janata Party
Khesraha	None	Diwakar Vikram Singh	Indian National Congress
Menhdawal	None	Abdul Kalam	Samajwadi Party
Khalilabad	None	Ram Asrey Paswan	Janata Dal
Hainsarbazar	SC	Lal Mani Prasad	Bahujan Samaj Party
Bansgaon	SC	Sant	Bharatiya Janata Party
Dhuriapar	SC	Markandey Chand	Bahujan Samaj Party
Chillupar	None	Hari Shankar Tiwari	All India Indira Congress
Kauriram	None	Gauri Devi	Samajwadi Party
Mundera Bazar	SC	Bechan Ram	Bharatiya Janata Party
Pipraich	None	Jitendra Kumar Jaiswal Urf Pappu Bhaiya	Independent
Gorakhpur	None	Shiv Pratap Shukla	Bharatiya Janata Party
Maniram	None	Subhawati Devi	Samajwadi Party
Sahjanwa	None	Tarkeshwar Prasad Shukla	Bharatiya Janata Party
Paniara	None	Fateh Bahadur	Indian National Congress
Pharenda	None	Vinod Mani	Communist Party of India
Luxmipur	None	Amar Mani	Indian National Congress
Siswa	None	Shivendra Singh Urf Shiv Babu	Bahujan Samaj Party
Maharajganj	SC	Chandra Kishor	Bharatiya Janata Party
Shyamdeurawa	None	Gyanendra Singh	Bharatiya Janata Party
Naurangia	SC	Deep Lal Bharti	Bharatiya Janata Party
Ramkola	None	Radhey Shyam	Independent
Hata	SC	Ram Nakshatra	Janata Dal
Padrauna	None	Ratan Jeet Pratap Narain Singh	Indian National Congress
Seorahi	None	Anand Prakash	Independent
Fazilnagar	None	Vishwanath	Samajwadi Party
Kasia	None	Surya Pratap Shahi	Bharatiya Janata Party
Gauri Bazar	None	Sri Niwas Mani	Bharatiya Janata Party
Rudrapur	None	Jai Prakash Nishad	Bharatiya Janata Party
Deoria	None	Subash Chandra Srivastav	Janata Dal
Bhatpar Rani	None	Yogendra Singh	Samajwadi Party
Salempur	None	Morad Lari	Bahujan Samaj Party
Barhaj	None	Prem Prakash	Bahujan Samaj Party
Nathupur	None	Sudhakar	Samajwadi Party
Ghosi	None	Fagoo	Bharatiya Janata Party
Sagri	None	Ram Pyare	Samajwadi Party
Gopalpur	None	Wasim Ahmad	Samajwadi Party
Azamgarh	None	Durga Prasad	Samajwadi Party
Nizamabad	None	Alam Badi	Samajwadi Party
Atraulia	None	Vibhuti Prasad Nishad	Bahujan Samaj Party
Phulpur	None	Ram Naresh Yadav	Indian National Congress
Saraimir	SC	Heera Lal	Bahujan Samaj Party
Mehnagar	SC	Ram Jug	Communist Party of India
Lalganj	None	Narendra	Bharatiya Janata Party
Mubarakpur	None	Yashwant	Bahujan Samaj Party
Muhammadabad Gohna	SC	Sri Ram	Bharatiya Janata Party
Mau	None	Mukhtar Ansari	Bahujan Samaj Party
Rasra	SC	Anil Kumar	Bharatiya Janata Party
Siar	None	Harinarain	Bharatiya Janata Party
Chilkahar	None	Chhote Lal	Bahujan Samaj Party
Sikanderpur	None	Rajdhari	Samata Party
Bansdih	None	Bachcha Pathak	Indian National Congress
Doaba	None	Bharat Singh	Bharatiya Janata Party
Ballia	None	Manju	Independent
Kopachit	None	Ambika Chaudhary	Samajwadi Party
Zahoorabad	None	Ganesh	Bharatiya Janata Party
Mohammadabad	None	Afjal Ansari	Samajwadi Party
Dildarnagar	None	Om Prakash	Samajwadi Party
Zamania	None	Kailash	Samajwadi Party
Ghazipur	None	Rajendra	Communist Party of India
Jakhania	SC	Vijay Kumar	Bahujan Samaj Party
Sadat	SC	Bhonu	Samajwadi Party
Saidpur	None	Mahendra Nath	Bharatiya Janata Party
Dhanapur	None	Prabhu Narayan	Samajwadi Party
Chandauli	SC	Shiv Poojan Ram	Bharatiya Janata Party
Chakiya	SC	Satya Prakash Sonkar	Samajwadi Party
Mughalsarai	None	Chhabbu Patel	Bharatiya Janata Party
Varanasi Cantonment	None	Harish Chandra (harish Ji)	Bharatiya Janata Party
Varanasi South	None	Shyam Dev Rai Chawdhri (dada)	Bharatiya Janata Party
Varanasi North	None	Abdul Kalam	Samajwadi Party
Chiraigaon	None	Virendra Singh	Indian National Congress
Kolasla	None	Ajai Rai	Bharatiya Janata Party
Gangapur	None	Bachnu Ram Patel	Bharatiya Janata Party
Aurai	None	Rangnath	Bharatiya Janata Party
Gyanpur	None	Gorakhnath	Bharatiya Janata Party
Bhadohi	SC	Purnmasi Pankaj	Bharatiya Janata Party
Barsathi	None	Vanshnarain	Bahujan Samaj Party
Mariahu	None	Paras Nath Yadav	Samajwadi Party
Kerakat	SC	Ashok Kumar	Bharatiya Janata Party
Bayalsi	None	Jagdish Narain (munna)	Bahujan Samaj Party
Jaunpur	None	Afjal Ahmad	Samajwadi Party
Rari	None	Shriram Yadava	Samajwadi Party
Shahganj	SC	Bankey Lal Sonkar	Bharatiya Janata Party
Khutahan	None	Umakant Yadav	Samajwadi Party
Garwara	None	Seema Dwivedi	Bharatiya Janata Party
Machhlishahr	None	Jwala Prasad Yadav	Samajwadi Party
Dudhi	SC	Vijay Singh	Samajwadi Party
Robertsganj	SC	Hari Prasad Urf Ghamadi	Independent
Rajgarh	None	Lok Pati Tripathi	Indian National Congress
Chunar	None	Om Prakash Singh	Bharatiya Janata Party
Majhwa	None	Ram Chandra Maurya	Bharatiya Janata Party
Mirzapur	None	Sarjeet Singh	Bharatiya Janata Party
Chhanbey	SC	Bhai Lal	Bharatiya Janata Party
Meja	SC	Ram Kripal	Communist Party of India
Karchana	None	Revti Raman Singh Urf Mani	Samajwadi Party
Bara	None	Ram Sewak Singh	Bahujan Samaj Party
Jhusi	None	Vijma Yadav	Samajwadi Party
Handia	None	Rakesh Dhar Tripathi	Bharatiya Janata Party
Pratappur	None	Jokhu Lal	Samajwadi Party
Soraon	None	Rang Bahadur Patel	Bharatiya Janata Party
Nawabganj	None	Vikramjeet Maurya	Indian National Congress
Allahabad North	None	Narendra Kumar Singh Gaur	Bharatiya Janata Party
Allahabad South	None	Keshri Nath Tripathi	Bharatiya Janata Party
Allahabad West	None	Atik Ahmed	Samajwadi Party
Chail	SC	Vijai Prakash	Indian National Congress
Manjhanpur	SC	Indrajeet Saroj	Bahujan Samaj Party
Sirathu	SC	Matesh Chandra Sonker	Bahujan Samaj Party
Khaga	None	Munna Lal Maurya	Bahujan Samaj Party
Kishunpur	SC	Murli Dhar	Bahujan Samaj Party
Haswa	None	Ayodhya Prasad Pal	Bahujan Samaj Party
Fatehpur	None	Radhey Shyam Gupta	Bharatiya Janata Party
Jahanabad	None	Qasim Hasan	Bahujan Samaj Party
Bindki	None	Rajendra Singh Patel	Bahujan Samaj Party
Aryanagar	None	Mushtaq Solanki	Samajwadi Party
Sisamau	SC	Rakesh Sonkar	Bharatiya Janata Party
Generalganj	None	Neeraj Chaturvedi	Bharatiya Janata Party
Kanpur Cantonment	None	Satish Mahana	Bharatiya Janata Party
Govind Nagar	None	Bal Chandra Misra	Bharatiya Janata Party
Kalyanpur	None	Prem Lata Katiyar	Bharatiya Janata Party
Sarsaul	None	Ram Asrey Singh Kushwaha	Bahujan Samaj Party
Ghatampur	None	Raja Ram Pal	Bahujan Samaj Party
Bhognipur	SC	Radheyshyam	Bahujan Samaj Party
Rajpur	None	Chaudhari Narendra Singh	Bahujan Samaj Party
Sarvankhera	None	Mathura Prasad	Bharatiya Janata Party
Chaubepur	None	Harikishan	Bahujan Samaj Party
Bilhaur	SC	Bhagwati Prasad	Bahujan Samaj Party
Derapur	None	Devendra Singh Alias Bhole Singh	Bharatiya Janata Party
Auraiya	None	Lal Singh Verma	Bharatiya Janata Party
Ajitmal	SC	Mohar Singh Ambadi	Bahujan Samaj Party
Lakhna	SC	Sukh Devi Verma	Samajwadi Party
Etawah	None	Jayvir Singh Bhadoria	Bharatiya Janata Party
Jaswantnagar	None	Shivpal Singh Yadav	Samajwadi Party
Bharthana	None	Maharaj Singh Yadav	Samajwadi Party
Bidhuna	None	Dhani Ram Verma	Samajwadi Party
Kannauj	SC	Banwari Lal Dohrey	Bharatiya Janata Party
Umarda	None	Kailash Singh Rajput	Bharatiya Janata Party
Chhibramau	None	Chhote Singh Yadav	Samajwadi Party
Kamalganj	None	Jamalluddin Siddiqui	Samajwadi Party
Farrukhabad	None	Brahma Dutt Dwivedi	Bharatiya Janata Party
Kaimganj	None	Sushil Shakya	Bharatiya Janata Party
Mohammdabad	None	Narendra Singh Yadav	Samajwadi Party
Manikpur	SC	Daddoo Prasad	Bahujan Samaj Party
Karwi	None	R. K. Singh Patel	Bahujan Samaj Party
Baberu	None	Shiv Shankar	Bharatiya Janata Party
Tindwari	None	Mahendra Pal Nishad	Bahujan Samaj Party
Banda	None	Vivek Kumar Singh	Indian National Congress
Naraini	None	Babu Lal Kushwaha	Bahujan Samaj Party
Hamirpur	None	Shivcharan Prajapati	Bahujan Samaj Party
Maudaha	None	Badshah Singh	Bharatiya Janata Party
Rath	None	Ramadhar Singh	Samajwadi Party
Charkhari	SC	Chhote Lal	Bharatiya Janata Party
Mahoba	None	Arimardan Singh	Samajwadi Party
Mehroni	None	Pooran Singh Bundela	Indian National Congress
Lalitpur	None	Arvind Kumar Jain	Bharatiya Janata Party
Jhansi	None	Ravindra Shukla	Bharatiya Janata Party
Babina	SC	Shatish Jatariya	Bahujan Samaj Party
Mauranipur	None	Bihari Lal Arya	Indian National Congress
Garautha	None	Chandra Pal Singh Yadav	Samajwadi Party
Konch	SC	Daya Shankar	Independent
Orai	None	Babu Ram	Bharatiya Janata Party
Kalpi	None	Shreeram	Bahujan Samaj Party
Madhogarh	None	Sant Ram Singh	Bharatiya Janata Party
Bhongaon	None	Ram Autar Shakya	Samajwadi Party
Kishni	SC	Rameshwar Dayal Balmiki	Samajwadi Party
Karhal	None	Baboo Ram Yadav	Samajwadi Party
Shikohabad	None	Ashok Yadav	Bharatiya Janata Party
Jasrana	None	Ramveer Singh	Samajwadi Party
Ghiror	None	Urmila Devi	Samajwadi Party
Mainpuri	None	Manik Chand Yadav	Samajwadi Party
Aliganj	None	Rameshwar Singh Yadav	Samajwadi Party
Patiyali	None	Kunwar Davendra Singh Yadav	Samajwadi Party
Sakeet	None	Virendra Singh	Samajwadi Party
Soron	None	Omkar	Bharatiya Janata Party
Kasganj	None	Netram Singh	Bharatiya Janata Party
Etah	None	Shishu Pal Singh Yadav	Samajwadi Party
Nidhauli Kalan	None	Om Prakash	Bharatiya Janata Party
Jalesar	SC	Mithlesh Kumari	Bharatiya Janata Party
Firozabad	None	Raghubar Dayal Verma	Samata Party
Bah	None	Raja Mahendra Aridaman Singh	Bharatiya Janata Party
Fatehabad	None	Vijay Pal Singh	Janata Dal
Tundla	SC	Shiv Singh	Bharatiya Janata Party
Etmadpur	SC	Ganga Prasad Pushkar	Bahujan Samaj Party
Dayalbagh	None	Seth Kishan Lal Baghel	Bahujan Samaj Party
Agra Cantonment	None	Kesho Mehra	Bharatiya Janata Party
Agra East	None	Satya Prakash Vikal	Bharatiya Janata Party
Agra West	SC	Ram Babu Harit	Bharatiya Janata Party
Kheragarh	None	Mandleshwar Singh	Indian National Congress
Fatehpur Sikri	None	Babulal	Independent
Goverdhan	SC	Ajay Kumar Poeia	Bharatiya Janata Party
Mathura	None	Ram Swaroop Sharma	Bharatiya Janata Party
Chhata	None	Laxminarayan	Indian National Congress
Mat	None	Shyam Sundar Sharma	All India Indira Congress
Gokul	None	Sardar Singh	Bahujan Samaj Party
Sadabad	None	Vishambhar Singh	Bharatiya Janata Party
Hathras	None	Ram Vir Upadhyay	Bahujan Samaj Party
Sasni	SC	Hari Shankar Mahor	Bharatiya Janata Party
Sikandara Rao	None	Yashpal Singh Chauhan	Bharatiya Janata Party
Gangiri	None	Ram Singh	Bharatiya Janata Party
Atrauli	None	Kalyan Singh	Bharatiya Janata Party
Aligarh	None	Abdual Khaliq	Samajwadi Party
Koil	SC	Ram Sakhi	Bharatiya Janata Party
Iglas	None	Malkhan Singh	Bharatiya Janata Party
Barauli	None	Dal Vir Singh	Indian National Congress
Khair	None	Gyan Wati	Bharatiya Janata Party
Jewar	SC	Horam Singh	Bharatiya Janata Party
Khurja	None	Har Pal Singh	Bharatiya Janata Party
Debai	None	Kalyan Singh	Bharatiya Janata Party
Anupshahr	None	Satish Sharma	Indian National Congress
Siana	None	Rakesh Tyagi	Indian National Congress
Agota	None	Virendra Singh Sirohi	Bharatiya Janata Party
Bulandshahr	None	Mahendra Singh Yadav	Bharatiya Janata Party
Shikarpur	SC	Postponed due to death of a candidate	
Sikandrabad	None	Narendra Singh Bhati	Samajwadi Party
Dadri	None	Nawab Singh Nagar	Bharatiya Janata Party
Ghaziabad	None	Baleshwar Tyagi	Bharatiya Janata Party
Muradnagar	None	Raj Pal Tyagi	Samajwadi Party
Modinagar	None	Narendra Singh Sisodiya	Bharatiya Janata Party
Hapur	SC	Jay Prakash	Bharatiya Janata Party
Garhmukteshwar	None	Ram Naresh	Bharatiya Janata Party
Kithore	None	Parvez Haleem Khan	Bharatiya Kisan Kamgar Party
Hastinapur	SC	Atul Kumar	Independent
Sardhana	None	Ravindra Pundir	Bharatiya Janata Party
Meerut Cantonment	None	Amit Agarwal	Bharatiya Janata Party
Meerut	None	Laxmikant Vajpayee	Bharatiya Janata Party
Kharkhauda	None	Jaipal Singh	Bharatiya Janata Party
Siwalkhas	SC	Vanarsi Das Chandna	Bharatiya Kisan Kamgar Party
Khekra	None	Roop Chaudhri	Bharatiya Janata Party
Baghpat	None	Kawkab Hameed	Bharatiya Kisan Kamgar Party
Barnawa	None	Samar Pal Singh	Bharatiya Kisan Kamgar Party
Chhaprauli	None	Gajendra Kumar Munna	Bharatiya Kisan Kamgar Party
Kandhla	None	Virendra Singh	Bharatiya Kisan Kamgar Party
Khatauli	None	Raj Pal Singh	Bharatiya Kisan Kamgar Party
Jansath	SC	Bijendra Arya	Bharatiya Kisan Kamgar Party
Morna	None	Sanjay Singh	Samajwadi Party
Muzaffarnagar	None	Susheela Devi	Bharatiya Janata Party
Charthawal	SC	Randhir Singh	Bharatiya Janata Party
Baghra	None	Pradeep Kumar	Bharatiya Janata Party
Kairana	None	Hukum Singh	Bharatiya Janata Party
Thana Bhawan	None	Amir Alam Khan	Samajwadi Party
Nakur	None	Kunwar Pal Singh	Independent
Sarsawa	None	Nirbhaya Pal Sharma	Bharatiya Janata Party
Nagal	SC	Ilam Singh	Bahujan Samaj Party
Deoband	None	Sukhbeer Singh Pundir	Bharatiya Janata Party
Harora	SC	Mayawati	Bahujan Samaj Party
Saharanpur	None	Sanjay Garg	Samajwadi Party
Muzaffarabad	None	Jagdish Singh Rana	Samajwadi Party
Roorkee	None	Ram Singh Saini	Samajwadi Party
Lhaksar	None	Muhammad Muhiuddin	Bahujan Samaj Party
Hardwar	None	Ambrish Kumar	Samajwadi Party
Mussoorie	None	Rajendra Singh	Bharatiya Janata Party
Dehra Dun	None	Harbans Kapoor	Bharatiya Janata Party
Chakrata	ST	Munna Singh Chauhan	Samajwadi Party
