= Alok Kumar Shakya =

Indian politician (born 1972)

Member of the Legislative Assembly for Bhongaon
- In office March 2012 – March 2017
- Succeeded by: Ram Naresh Agnihotri
- In office May 2007 – March 2012
- In office February 2002 – May 2007
- Preceded by: Late Shri Ram Autar Shakya (MLA)
- Constituency: Bhongaon

Personal details
- Born: 15 March 1972 (age 54) district
- Party: Samajwadi Party
- Spouse: Smt Rekha Shakya
- Children: 1 son (Utkarsh Shakya) and 1 daughter (Nishtha Shakya)
- Parent: Late Shri Ram Autar Shakya (MLA) (father)
- Education: Chaudhary Charan Singh University
- Profession: Agriculture Social Service And Politician
- Portfolio: Technical Education Minister (2013–2015)

Alok Kumar Shakya is a member of the 14th, 15th and Sixteenth Legislative Assembly of Uttar Pradesh in India. He represents the Bhongaon constituency of Uttar Pradesh and is a member of the Samajwadi Party political party. In 2022, prior to by-election in Mainpuri Assembly constituency, Shakya was appointed district president of Samajwadi Party for Mainpuri. This was done in a bid to secure the support of Shakya voters, who were the most populous group after Yadavs in this constituency. He has also served as a minister in Government of Uttar Pradesh.

== Early life and education ==
Alok Kumar was born in Mainpuri district. He attended the Chaudhary Charan Singh University and attained Bachelor of Arts degree.

== Political career ==
Alok Kumar has been a MLA for three terms. He represented the Bhongaon constituency and is a member of the Samajwadi Party political party. Alok Kumar is the only leader who holds the record of consecutive three time MLA from constituency Bhongaon since the Independence. In 2012 U. P. General Elections Alok Kumar won the Bhongaon seat by the margin of over 50,000 votes from his competitor Sakshi Maharaj, prominent and strong leader of Bharatiya Janta Party. He also held the position of State Minister of Technical Education in Uttar Pradesh Government during his third tenure as MLA. The main cause of losing his seat in 2017 is the division of votes in his constituency due to family feud in Yadav Parivaar. He lost his seat in the 2017 Uttar Pradesh Assembly election to Ram Naresh Agnihotri of the Bharatiya Janata Party.

== Posts held ==
#	From	To	Position	Comments
01	2012	2017	Member, 16th Legislative Assembly	
02	2007	2012	Member, 15th Legislative Assembly	
03	2002	2007	Member, 14th Legislative Assembly	
04	2013	2015	Minister of State for Technical Education	

== See also ==
- Bhongaon (Assembly constituency)
- Sixteenth Legislative Assembly of Uttar Pradesh
- Uttar Pradesh Legislative Assembly
