= Balram Singh Yadav =

Indian politician

Chaudhary Balram Singh Yadav
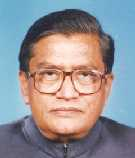

Minister of Mines
- In office 21 June 1991 – 15 September 1995
- Prime Minister: P. V. Narasimha Rao
- Succeeded by: Giridhar Gamang

Member of Parliament, Lok Sabha
- In office 19 March 1998 – 22 May 2004
- Preceded by: Mulayam Singh Yadav
- Succeeded by: Mulayam Singh Yadav
- Constituency: Mainpuri
- In office 31 December 1984 – 2 December 1989
- Preceded by: Raghunath Singh Verma
- Succeeded by: Uday Pratap Singh
- Constituency: Mainpuri

Member of Parliament, Rajya Sabha
- In office 3 April 1990 – 2 April 1996
- Constituency: Uttar Pradesh

Personal details
- Born: 22 April 1939 Kharagpur Saraiya, United Provinces, British India
- Died: 4 July 2005 (aged 66) Agra, Uttar Pradesh, India
- Party: INC (1969-97) (2004-2005)
- Other political affiliations: SP (1997-2001); BJP (2001-04)
- Spouse: Krishna Devi Yadav (m. 1955–2005)
- Children: 2 (sons) 1 (daughter)
- Education: B. A., LL.B.
- Alma mater: K.K. College, Etawah; Lucknow University

Chaudhary Balram Singh Yadav (22 April 1939 – 4 July 2005) was an Indian politician from Uttar Pradesh. He died on 4 July 2005, at the age of 66.

== Positions Held ==
- 1969-74 Member, Uttar Pradesh Legislative Assembly
- 1969-70 Deputy Minister, Uttar Pradesh
- 1971-73 Cabinet Minister, Uttar Pradesh
- 1972-97 Member, All India Congress Committee (A.I.C.C.)
- 1980-84 Member, Uttar Pradesh Legislative Assembly Cabinet Minister, Uttar Pradesh
- 1984 Elected to 8th Lok Sabha
- 1984-88 vice-president, Pradesh Congress Committee (Indira) [P.C.C.(I)], Uttar Pradesh Member, Congress Parliamentary Board (C.P.B.), Uttar Pradesh
- 1988-90 President, P.C.C.(I), Uttar Pradesh
- 1990-96 Member, Rajya Sabha
- 1990 Member, C.P.B., Uttar Pradesh Vice-president, P.C.C., Uttar Pradesh
- 1991-95 Union Minister of State, Mines (Independent Charge)
- 1995-96 Union Minister of State, Planning and Programme Implementation (Independent Charge)
- 1998 Rashtriya Mahasachiv, Samajwadi Party
- 1998 Re-elected to 12th Lok Sabha (2nd term)
- 1998-99 Member, Committee on Public Undertakings Member, Committee on Petroleum, Chemicals and Fertilizers Member, House Committee Member, Consultative Committee, Ministry of Civil Aviation.
