= Guru Prasad Maurya =

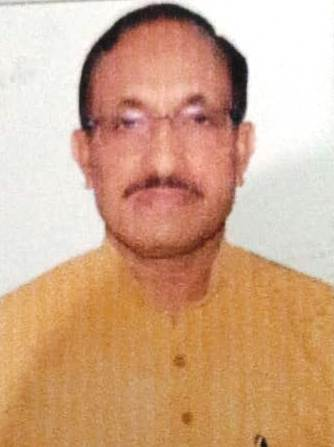

Member of Uttar Pradesh Legislative Assembly
- Incumbent
- Assumed office March 2022
- Preceded by: Vikramjeet Maurya
- Constituency: Phaphamau

Member of Uttar Pradesh Legislative Assembly
- In office March 2007 – March 2012
- Preceded by: Ansar Ahmad
- Succeeded by: Constituency abolished
- Constituency: Nawabganj

Personal details
- Born: 3 February 1968 (age 58)
- Citizenship: Indian
- Party: Bharatiya Janata Party
- Other political affiliations: Bahujan Samaj Party

Guru Prasad Maurya is an Indian politician from the BJP party, who is currently Member of the Uttar Pradesh Legislative Assembly from Phaphamau Assembly constituency. Previously, he has been MLA from Nawabganj as Bahujan Samaj Party candidate from 2007 to 2012 tenure.
