= Yogesh Dhama =

Indian legislator

Member of the Uttar Pradesh Legislative Assembly
- Incumbent
- Assumed office Mar 2017
- Preceded by: Hemlata Chaudhary
- Constituency: Bagpat

Personal details
- Born: 12 January 1976 (age 50) Behta Hazipur, Uttar Pradesh, India
- Party: Bharatiya Janata Party

Yogesh Dhama is a member of the Bharatiya Janata Party (BJP). He is also into agriculture and also runs a gas agency. Currently, the Baghpat constituency is held by Yogesh Dhama.

== Political career ==
In 2017, Yogesh Dhama won the election against Ahmad Hameed of Rashtriya Lok Dal with 6,733 votes and became the MLA of the Baghpat. In 2022, he won against Arun Kasana of Bahujan Samaj Party. The police increased his security after the threat by Sunil Rathi.

== Controversy ==
Prior to 2022 Uttar Pradesh Legislative Assembly election, he was reported to have broken the election code of conduct when he conducted a public meeting in the village named Khindauda along with loud playing drums. The case was registered against 30 unknown people, including Yogesh Dhama.
