= Ram Asrey Singh Kushwaha =

Indian politician from Uttar Pradesh

Member of Uttar Pradesh Legislative Assembly
- In office 1997–2002
- Constituency: Sarsaul Assembly constituency

Personal details
- Born: 5 February 1953 (age 73) Kanpur Nagar, Uttar Pradesh
- Party: Bahujan Samaj Party; Samajwadi Party
- Spouse: Sarala Singh

Ram Asrey Singh Kushwaha is an Indian politician based in Uttar Pradesh, who was elected to 13th Uttar Pradesh Legislative Assembly via 1996 Uttar Pradesh Legislative Assembly elections from Sarsaul Assembly constituency. He was a member of Bahujan Samaj Party then. Kushwaha has also served as an office bearer of 'Kushwaha Kalyan Parishad', an organisation working for the Other Backward Class. In later part of his political career, he joined Samajwadi Party and served as its National General Secretary. He also held the position of Uttar Pradesh Remote Sensing Centre based in Lucknow, which has similar status to the Minister of State in Government of Uttar Pradesh.

== Political career ==
Ram Asrey Singh Kushwaha was born on 5 February 1953 to M.L Singh in Kanpur Nagar district of Uttar Pradesh in an Other Backward Class Kushwaha family. He is a doctorate and also holds a master's degree in Commerce. He was married to Sarala Singh on 24 June 1974. They had one son and a daughter from their marriage. Kushwaha was involved in pedagogy, before joining politics. His political career got a boost with his election to Uttar Pradesh Legislative Assembly in mid term elections of 1996 from Sarsaul Assembly constituency on the ticket of Bahujan Samaj Party.

Kushwaha was also active in social service and promoted art and literature. He was a president of Uttar Pradesh Kala Manch, which worked for promotion of art and culture. In 1986, he became the president of 'Kushwaha Kalyan Parishad', a caste organisation. Between 1997-98, he held the chair of Committee for Schedule Castes, Schedule Tribes and Denotified Tribes in Uttar Pradesh Legislative Assembly. On 27 October 1997, he was appointed as Minister for welfare of Schedule Castes and Schedule Tribes in Kalyan Singh ministry.

He got 52,776 votes in 1996 Assembly elections and defeated Jagram Singh of Samajwadi Party. In 2013, Samajwadi Party entrusted him with the task of connecting people belonging to Kushwaha caste with the party, which was traditionally considered as a votebank of Bahujan Samaj Party. Kushwaha was also made National General Secretary of the party but removed from the post in October 2013 for giving irresponsible statements in the media causing embarrassment for the party.
