= Ram Autar Shakya =

Former member of Uttar Pradesh Legislative Assembly

Member of Uttar Pradesh Legislative Assembly
- In office 1991–1993
- Constituency: Bhongaon Assembly constituency

Member of Uttar Pradesh Legislative Assembly
- In office 1997–2002
- Constituency: Bhongaon Assembly constituency

Personal details
- Born: 13 June 1948 Ujagarpur village, Mainpuri district, Uttar Pradesh
- Party: Samajwadi Party
- Other political affiliations: Janata Party
- Spouse: Rambeti
- Children: Alok Kumar Shakya
- Parent: Mitthu Lal (father)

Ram Autar Shakya (born 13 June 1948) was an Indian politician based in Uttar Pradesh. He was elected to Uttar Pradesh Legislative Assembly twice from the Bhongaon Assembly constituency. Shakya was elected to Uttar Pradesh Legislative Assembly for the first time in 1991, as a candidate of Janata Party. In 1996 mid-term elections, he was elected to 13th Uttar Pradesh Legislative Assembly, but this time, as a candidate of Samajwadi Party. The Bhongaon Assembly constituency was later represented by his son Alok Kumar Shakya, who represented this constituency thrice after death of his father.

== Life and political career ==
Ram Autar Shakya was born to Mitthu Lal in Ujagarpur village of Mainpuri district of Uttar Pradesh on 13 June 1948. He was born in a Hindu Other Backward Class family, but later, he became a follower of Buddhism. After completing his bachelor's degree, he pursued his degree of law and became an advocate. In June 1965, he was married to Rambeti, with whom he had two sons and a daughter. Shakya worked as a lawyer and an agriculturist before becoming a part of active politics of the state of Uttar Pradesh. In May–June 1991, he contested his first assembly elections and became a member of Uttar Pradesh Legislative Assembly on the ticket of Janata Party. His second stint as M.L.A came in 1996, when he was re-elected to Uttar Pradesh Legislative Assembly on the ticket of Samajwadi Party. In this election, he defeated Shivraj Singh of Bahujan Samaj Party.

Shakya was a prominent social activist. He participated in Lok Dal's Fill the Prisons and block the roads movement of 1974 and 1980 against inflation and 'Maya Tyagi case'. (Note: Six months pregnant with Deepak. Tyagi. then 26, was travelling in a car with her husband and two of his friends when they stopped at Baghpat. west of Meerut. While the men were sipping cold drinks, she was sitting in the car. A man ambled over and started misbehaving with her. When her husband protested, there was a scuffle, and the man-Sub-inspector Narendra Singh in plain clothes-ran back to the nearby police station shouting "dacoits, dacoits". He returned with armed constables, who shot dead Tyagi's husband and his friends. Then Singh pulled Tyagi out of the car, stripped her and dragged her to the police station. She was then repeatedly raped.) Consequently, he was arrested and sent to Mainpuri district jail. Later, after his release, he served as member of Uttar Pradesh Legislative Assembly's committee on Schedule Castes, Schedule Tribes and Denotified Tribes. In 1991, he also served as president of Uttar Pradesh Cooperative Union. Between 1992 and 1996, he was the member of board of trustees of Agra college, Agra.
