= Shiv Ganga Vidya Mandir =

Schools in Uttar Pradesh

Shiv Ganga Vidya Mandir is a senior secondary, co-educational, english-medium, Central Board of Secondary Education affiliated school located in Sector F, Shantipuram, Phaphamau, Prayagraj. Shiv Ganga Vidya Mandir was established by Samaj Evam Paryavaran Vikas Sansthan in 2003 on the banks of the Ganga river in Prayagraj.

== Logo and motto ==
The school logo is " ॐ ", which is a symbol of spiritualism in Indian culture and civilization. The school's motto is "तमसो मा जयोतिर्गमय", a Sanskrit phrase from the Upanishads translated as "lead us from darkness to light". This school is apolitical, but has a proclivity towards right wing nationalism, having roots in the Vedic Civilization of India.

== Jurisdiction ==
Shiv Ganga Vidya Mandir provides education to eligible students from nursery to class 12. In 10+2, the school offers Humanity, Biology, and Mathematics, with Computer Science, Hindi, and Physical Activity as electives. Students attending the school primarily come from the Prayagraj division and surrounding districts.

== Infrastructure ==
Shiv Ganga Vidya Mandir resides on 60 acres on the bank of Ganga river. 65 classrooms, five laboratories, and one auditorium hall are available. The school inhabits a three-story, arch-shaped building. Basketball, hockey, football, cricket, lawn tennis, horse riding, and rifle shooting are offered in accordance with CBSE Board rules.

== Academic performance ==
In 2018, students at the school received 14 medals in academic competitions. Several students achieved a 10 CGPA in the Central Board of Secondary Education (CBSE) examinations.

== Activities ==
On 30 December 2017, a grand celebration of Prakash Parv of Guru Gobind Singh was organized by students and faculty to note the sacrifice made by Guru Gobind Singh and his family. Samaj Evam Paryavaran Vikas Sansthan provides merit and means-based scholarships to students. Students organize annual functions to present cultural activities like dance, drama and music to represent various regions of India.

== Conservation ==
Shiv Ganga Vidya Mandir celebrated Earth Day on 22 April 2017. On Earth Day Prof Oblonokov Igor planted trees with the students. General Manager of Dainik Jagran gave an address. Pollution control and water conservation was the main theme.

On 21 March 2018 Sparrow Conservation week was celebrated by faculty and students.

== National initiatives ==
Utistha:-International Vedic Summer Camp was organized under UNESCO supervision. This was a 10-day international Vedic camp.

The Gyan Punj yojna is a program designed for students from minority communities. It celebrates Hindu New year.

== International initiatives ==
Chandra Sekhar Azad Birthday has been celebrated in 18 countries on 23 July 2017 to promote fraternity and humanity. The school is conducts educational tours to countries like Russia. Shiv Ganga Vidya Mandir established an Indo-Russian Cultural Study Centre on 17 June 2018.

The school has organized educational tours to Russia focusing on science and technology.

== Leadership ==
It is run by Samaj Evam Paryavaran Vikashas Sansthan
