= Nawabganj, Allahabad Assembly constituency =

Former constituency of Uttar Pradesh, India

Coordinates: 25.571°N 81.739°E

Nawabganj
- Former constituency for the Uttar Pradesh Legislative Assembly

Constituency details
- Country: India
- Region: North India
- State: Uttar Pradesh
- District: Allahabad
- Established: 1974
- Abolished: 2012
- Reservation: None

Nawabganj is a former constituency of the Uttar Pradesh Legislative Assembly, in the state of Uttar Pradesh, India. It was in Allahabad district, now called Prayagraj. the Delimitation Commission 2002 abolished Nawabganj Legislative Assembly and created a new constituency as Phaphamau Assembly constituency which came into existence in 2012. Samajwadi Party candidate Ansar Ahmed elected first public representative from the new assembly constituency.

== Members of the Legislative Assembly ==
Election	Name	Party
1974	Ram Puajn Patel	Indian National Congress
1977	Muzaffer Hasan	Janata Party
1980	Mohd. Amin	Indian National Congress
1985	Jawahar Singh Yadav	Lok Dal
1989	Nazam Uddin	Bahujan Samaj Party
1991	Prabha Shanker Pandey	Bharatiya Janata Party
1993	Nazam Uddin	Bahujan Samaj Party
1996	Vikramjeet Maurya	Indian National Congress
2002	Ansar Ahmad	Apna Dal
2007	Guru Prasad Maurya	Bahujan Samaj Party

== See also ==
- Prayagraj district
- List of constituencies of the Uttar Pradesh Legislative Assembly
