= Mainpuri Assembly constituency =

Constituency of the Uttar Pradesh legislative assembly in India

Mainpuri
- Constituency No. 107 for the Uttar Pradesh Legislative Assembly

Constituency details
- Country: India
- Region: North India
- State: Uttar Pradesh
- District: Mainpuri
- Lok Sabha constituency: Mainpuri
- Total electors: 290,690 (2012)
- Reservation: None

Member of Legislative Assembly
- 18th Uttar Pradesh Legislative Assembly
- Incumbent Jaiveer Singh
- Party: Bharatiya Janata Party
- Elected year: 2022
- Preceded by: Raju Yadav

Mainpuri Assembly (Hindi pronunciation: [mɛːn̪.pʊɾiː]) is one of the 403 constituencies of the Uttar Pradesh Legislative Assembly, India. It is a part of the Mainpuri district and one of the five assembly constituencies in the Mainpuri Lok Sabha constituency. The first election in this assembly constituency was held in 1952 after the "DPACO (1951)" (delimitation order) was passed in 1951. After the "Delimitation of Parliamentary and Assembly Constituencies Order" was passed in 2008, the constituency was assigned identification number 107.

== Wards / Areas ==
Extent of Mainpuri Assembly constituency is KCs Kurawali, Mainpuri, Kuraoli NP, Jyoti Khuria NP & Mainpuri (MB+OG) of Mainpuri Tehsil.

== Members of the Legislative Assembly ==
#	Term	Name	Party	From	To	Days	Comments	Ref
01	01st Vidhan Sabha	Brajeshwar sahay	Indian National Congress	Mar-1952	Mar-1957	1,849	-	
02	02nd Vidhan Sabha	Malikhan Singh	Bharatiya Jana Sangh	Apr-1957	Mar-1962	1,800	-	
03	03rd Vidhan Sabha	Chaudhary Sushil Singh Yadav	Indian National Congress	Mar-1962	Mar-1967	1,828	-	
04	04th Vidhan Sabha	Malikhan Singh	Bharatiya Jana Sangh	Mar-1967	Apr-1968	402	-	
05	05th Vidhan Sabha	Malikhan Singh	Bharatiya Jana Sangh	Feb-1969	Mar-1974	1,832	-	
06	06th Vidhan Sabha	Baba Ram Nath	Communist Party of India (Marxist)	Mar-1974	Apr-1977	1,153	-	
07	07th Vidhan Sabha	Malikhan Singh	Janata Party	Jun-1977	Feb-1980	969	-	
08	08th Vidhan Sabha	Raghuvir Singh Yadav	Indian National Congress (Indira)	Jun-1980	Mar-1985	1,735	-	
09	09th Vidhan Sabha	Raghuvir Singh Yadav	Indian National Congress	Mar-1985	Nov-1989	1,725	-	
10	10th Vidhan Sabha	Indal Singh Chauhan	Janata Dal	Dec-1989	Apr-1991	488	-	
11	11th Vidhan Sabha	Narender Singh	Bharatiya Janata Party	Jun-1991	Dec-1992	533	-	
12	12th Vidhan Sabha	Narender Singh	Bharatiya Janata Party	Dec-1993	Oct-1995	693	-	
13	13th Vidhan Sabha	Manik Chand Yadav	Samajwadi Party	Oct-1996	May-2002	1,967	-	
14	14th Vidhan Sabha	Ashok Singh Chauhan	Bharatiya Janata Party	Feb-2002	May-2007	1,902	-	
15	15th Vidhan Sabha	Ashok Singh Chauhan	Bharatiya Janata Party	May-2007	Mar-2012	1,762	-	
16	16th Vidhan Sabha	Raju Yadav	Samajwadi Party	Mar-2012	Mar-2017	-	-	
17	17th Vidhan Sabha	Raju Yadav	Samajwadi Party	Mar-2017	Mar-2022		-	
18	18th Vidhan Sabha	Jaiveer Singh	Bharatiya Janata Party	Mar-2022	Incumbent		-	

== Election results ==
Vote share of winning candidates
2022	46.73%
2017	38.51%
2012	32.94%
2007	38.52%
2002	28.38%
1996	46.95%
1993	35.47%
1991	39.81%

=== 2027 ===
2027 Uttar Pradesh Legislative Assembly election: Mainpuri
Party	Candidate	Votes	%	±%
INDIA				
NDA				
BSP				
NOTA	None of the above			
Majority				
Turnout				
gain from		Swing		

=== 2022 ===
2022 Uttar Pradesh Legislative Assembly election: Mainpuri
Party	Candidate	Votes	%	±%
BJP	Jaiveer Singh	99,814	46.73	+12.71
SP	Raju Yadav	93,048	43.56	+5.05
BSP	Gaurav Nand	17,216	8.06	−16.49
INC	Vineeta Shakya	2,558	1.2	
NOTA	None of the above	953	0.45	−0.14
Majority		6,766	3.17	−1.32
Turnout		213,589	61.85	+1.58
BJP gain from SP		Swing		

=== 2017 ===
2017 Uttar Pradesh Legislative Assembly Election: Mainpuri
Party	Candidate	Votes	%	±%
SP	Raju Yadav	75,787	38.51	
BJP	Ashok Kumar	66,956	34.02	
BSP	Maharaj Singh	48,314	24.55	
NOTA	None of the above	1,157	0.59	
Majority		8,831	4.49	
Turnout		196,813	60.27	

=== 2012 ===
2012 General Elections: Mainpuri
Party	Candidate	Votes	%	±%
SP	Raju Yadav	54,990	32.94	−
BSP	Rama Shakya	40,781	24.43	−
INC	Prof. Kalicharan Yadav	24,280	14.55	−
	Remainder 12 candidates	46,879	28.09	−
Majority		14,209	8.51	−
Turnout		166,930	57.43	−
SP gain from BJP		Swing		

=== 2007 ===
2007 Uttar Pradesh Legislative Assembly election: Mainpuri
Party	Candidate	Votes	%	±%
BJP	Ashok Singh Chauhan	49,367	38.52	+10.14
SP	Prof. Kalicharan Yadav	44,898	35.03	+8.09
BSP	Sunil Verma alias Lalu	24,352	19.00	+1.12
INC	Shankar Lal Batham	4,265	3.33	+1.86
Independent	Subhash Pratap Singh	1,194	0.93	
Independent	Balveer Singh	1,169	0.91	
RLD	Omprakash	789	0.62	
NCP	Manju Dixit	424	0.33	+0.06
Bharatiya Janshakti Party	Ajay Kumar Dubey alias Anju	374	0.29	
Independent	Rajesh Kumar	307	0.24	
Independent	Pradeep Kumar	304	0.24	
Jan Morcha	Nasir Khan	293	0.23	
Independent	Shiv Pratap Singh	262	0.20	
SS	Saurabh	176	0.14	
Majority		4,469	3.49	+2.05
Turnout		128,174		
BJP hold		Swing		

=== 2002 ===
2002 Uttar Pradesh Legislative Assembly election: Mainpuri
Party	Candidate	Votes	%	±%
BJP	Ashok Singh Chauhan	36,239	28.38	−0.98
SP	Manik Chandra Yadav	34,410	26.94	−20.01
BSP	Ashwani Kumar alias Babloo Pandey	22,832	17.88	−5.31
RTKP	Vinod Kumar Kashyap	20,295	15.89	
Independent	Rambabu Kushwah	3,955	3.10	
Independent	Ashok Yadav	3,759	2.94	
INC	Arjun Singh	1,874	1.47	−13.52
NLP	Kalyan Singh Yadav	1,831	1.43	
Independent	Narendra Kumar	651	0.51	
Independent	Surendra Kumar	564	0.44	
Independent	Sagar Chandra	409	0.32	
NCP	Ravi Kumar Dixit	350	0.27	
Independent	Shivram Singh Chauhan	242	0.19	
Independent	Lakhpati Singh	152	0.12	
Independent	Vishwanath Singh	145	0.11	
Majority		1,829	1.44	−16.15
Turnout		127,708	51.36	−5.69
BJP gain from SP		Swing		

=== 1996 ===
1996 Uttar Pradesh Legislative Assembly election: Mainpuri
Party	Candidate	Votes	%	±%
SP	Manik Chand Yadav	64,973	46.95	+14.32
BJP	Narendra Singh	40,631	29.36	−6.11
BSP	Bhagwat Dass Shakya	32,098	23.19	+23.19
Bharatiya Janata Shakti	Rajendra Singh	348	0.25	
Independent	Ashok Kumar	163	0.12	
Independent	Surendra Kumar	76	0.05	
Independent	Ashawani Kumar	69	0.05	
Independent	Devendra Singh	36	0.03	
Majority		24,342	17.59	+14.75
Turnout		138,394	57.05	+3.85
SP gain from BJP		Swing		

=== 1993 ===
1993 Uttar Pradesh Legislative Assembly election: Mainpuri
Party	Candidate	Votes	%	±%
BJP	Narendra Singh	38,720	35.47	−4.34
SP	Kunwar Satyendra Singh	35,615	32.63	
INC	Kishan Chand Yadav	16,364	14.99	+5.28
Independent	Bhagwat Dass Shakya	9,977	9.14	
JD	Satish Chandra Chauhan	2,514	2.30	−9.27
SS	Sanjeev Kumar alias Gopal Duvedi	2,061	1.89	
Independent	Tej Singh Rajpoot	705	0.65	
JP	Pushp Lata Chauhan	446	0.41	
Independent	Shamsheet Ali Khan	100	0.09	
Independent	Sushil Kumar	82	0.08	
Independent	Brijesh Kumar	40	0.04	
Independent	Hamendra Nath Chaturvedi	30	0.03	
Majority		3,105	2.84	−7.15
Turnout		109,159	53.20	+2.05
BJP hold		Swing		

=== 1991 ===
1991 Uttar Pradesh Legislative Assembly election: Mainpuri
Party	Candidate	Votes	%	±%
BJP	Narender Singh	34,014	39.81	
JP	Kali Charan Yadav	25,479	29.82	
JD	Indal Singh Chauhan	9,881	11.57	
INC	Kaliyan Singh Yadav	8,297	9.71	
Independent	Satish Chander Kashyap	2,872	3.36	
BSP	Baba Ram Nath Yadav	2,852	3.34	
Independent	Girija Shankar Chaturvedi	524	0.61	
Independent	Parmod	403	0.47	
Independent	Vishav Pal Singh	340	0.40	
Doordarshi Party	Sri Pal	236	0.28	
Independent	Rameshwar Dayal	173	0.20	
Independent	Kanhiya Lal Ghusiya	122	0.14	
Independent	Nathu Singh Tomar	103	0.12	
Independent	Anil Kumar	73	0.09	
Independent	Peshkar Jatav	66	0.08	
Majority		8,535	9.99	
Turnout		88,209	51.15	
BJP hold		Swing		

== See also ==
- Mainpuri district
- Mainpuri Lok Sabha constituency
- Sixteenth Legislative Assembly of Uttar Pradesh
- Uttar Pradesh Legislative Assembly
- Vidhan Bhawan
