= Jawahar Singh Yadav =

Indian politician(born 1927)

- बाबू जवाहर सिंह यादव

MLA in 9th Legislative Assembly of Uttar Pradesh
- In office March 1985 – November 1989
- Preceded by: Mohhamed Amin Ansari
- Succeeded by: Nazam Uddin
- Constituency: Nawabganj

Personal details
- Born: 20th September, 1927 Allahabad, United Province, British India
- Died: 31 December 2003 (aged 76) Prayagraj, Uttar Pradesh, India
- Party: Samajwadi Party
- Spouse: Shanti Devi (married 1940)
- Education: M.A., L.L.B.
- Occupation: Advocate

Babu Jawahar Singh Yadav was an Indian politician who was a member of the Uttar Pradesh Legislative Assembly from Nawabganj of Allahabad. He was popularly known as Babu Ji among people. He was elected member of Uttar Pradesh Legislative Council as Samajwadi Party candidate from Allahabad (local body constituency) in December 2003 but died on 31 December 2003 before assuming office.

He was born on 20 September 1927 in Sarai Lalkhet village of Allahabad district of the then United Province, his father was Chaudhary Matabhikh Yadav. After getting his M.A. and L.L.B. degree from Allahabad University, he started practicing law. During this time, he was influenced by Chaudhary Charan Singh and entered active politics and joined Lok Dal. In the 1985 Uttar Pradesh Assembly elections, he was elected MLA as a Lok Dal candidate from Nawabganj by defeating Congress's sitting MLA Mohammad Amin Ansari. During the time of Lok Dal, he became close to Mulayam Singh Yadav, when Mulayam Singh Yadav founded Samajwadi Party in 1992, he was one of its founding members. He promoted and expanded the newly formed Samajwadi Party in Allahabad. Mulayam Singh Yadav made Jawahar Singh the District President of Samajwadi Party Allahabad and he remained on this post till his death.
