= All India Yadav Mahasabha =

Caste-based organisation in India

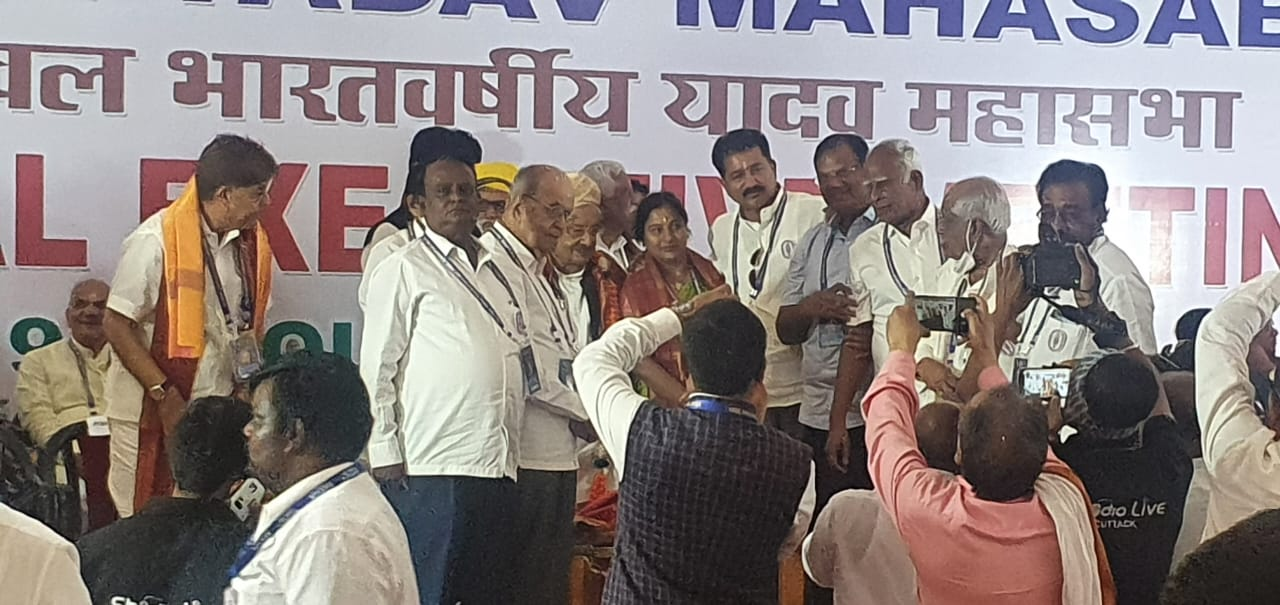
- AIYM Convection Meeting in Cuttack
- Formation: 17 April 1924 (102 years ago)
- Headquarters: Ghaziabad, Uttar Pradesh
- Key people: Uday Pratap Singh (President); Satya Prakash Singh Yadav
- Website: www.yadavsmovement.in

The All India Yadav Mahasabha is a caste-based community organisation established on 17 April 1924 to serve a broad body of Indian social groups collectively known as the Yadav caste.

The educated elite among the Yadavs instigated the formation of the All-India Yadav Mahasabha (AIYM) in 1924 in Allahabad, British India. It immediately engaged itself in two issues, appealing to its members in all regions to add Yadav to their names and at the same time launching a major programme to effect social reform.

In the mid-20th century, the AIYM pressed the Government of India to form a Yadav regiment in the Indian Army, following the performance of some caste members in the Sino-Indian War at Rezang La in Jammu and Kashmir on 18 November 1962.

== See also ==
- Yadav § All-India Yadav Mahasabha
- Sankritisation
- The Divine Heritage of the Yadavas
