= Vikramjeet Maurya =

Indian politician (c. 1959 – 2022)

MLA, 17th Legislative Assembly
- In office 2017–2022
- Preceded by: Ansar Ahmad
- Succeeded by: Guru Prasad Maurya
- Constituency: Phaphamau

Personal details
- Born: c. 1959
- Died: 15 December 2022 (aged 63)
- Party: Bharatiya Janata Party (since 2016), Indian National Congress (1996–1999), Samajwadi Party (before 2016)
- Occupation: MLA
- Profession: Politician

Vikramjeet Maurya (c. 1959 – 15 December 2022) was an Indian politician who was a member of 17th Legislative Assembly of Phaphamau, Uttar Pradesh of India. He represented the Phaphamau constituency of Uttar Pradesh and was a member of the Bharatiya Janata Party (BJP).

Vikramjeet first won the Assembly election in 1989 on the Janata Dal ticket from Pratappur and in 1996 won as Indian National Congress candidate from Nawabganj Vidhan Sabha (a major part of which now forms Phaphamau). Later, in 1997, he joined the newly formed Loktantrik Congress Party, which was headed by Naresh Agarwal, and became a minister of state for Energy and Excise in the BJP-led government.

Vikramjeet submitted his resignation in 2001 after Agarwal fell out with the then Chief Minister Rajnath Singh. Subsequently, Maurya joined the Samajwadi Party with Naresh Agarwal. In 2002, he contested Vidhan Sabha as Samajwadi Party candidate from Nawabganj (Now Phaphamau) but was defeated by Ansar Ahmad. Vikramjeet stood third after Bahujan Samaj Party candidate Tulsiram Yadav who was defeated by Ansar Ahmad with very small margin of 2500 votes.

Vikramjeet joined the BJP in 2016 and became a BJP Member of Legislative Assembly (MLA) from Phaphamau in 2017.

== Political career ==
Vikramjeet was a member of the 17th Legislative Assembly of Uttar Pradesh. From 2017, he represented the Phaphamau constituency and was a member of the BJP.

== Posts held ==
| # | From | To | Position | Comments |
|---|---|---|---|---|
| 01 | 2017 | 2022 | Member, 17th Legislative Assembly | |

== See also ==
- Uttar Pradesh Legislative Assembly
