= Baghpat Assembly constituency =

Constituency of the Uttar Pradesh legislative assembly in India

Bagpat
- Constituency No. 52 for the Uttar Pradesh Legislative Assembly

Constituency details
- Country: India
- Region: North India
- State: Uttar Pradesh
- District: Bagpat
- Total electors: 3,15,054 (2019)
- Reservation: None

Member of Legislative Assembly
- 18th Uttar Pradesh Legislative Assembly
- Incumbent Yogesh Dhama
- Party: Bharatiya Janata Party
- Elected year: 2022
- Preceded by: Hemlata Chaudhary

Bagpat Assembly constituency is one of the 403 constituencies of the Uttar Pradesh Legislative Assembly, India. It is a part of the Baghpat district and one of the five assembly constituencies in the Baghpat Lok Sabha constituency. First election in this assembly constituency was held in 1952 after the "DPACO (1952)" (delimitation order) was passed in 1952.The constituency was not in existence during the 4th and the 5th legislative assemblies of Uttar Pradesh. The constituency was formed again in 1974. After the "Delimitation of Parliamentary and Assembly Constituencies Order, 2008" was passed in 2008, the constituency was assigned identification number 52.Yogesh Dhama is current MLA, hailing from the BJP and won by margin of 31,360 votes in 2017 elections, and will contest again in 2022 assembly elections.

== History ==
First election in this assembly constituency was held in 1952 after the "SPACE (1951)" (delimitation order 1951) was passed in 1951. Umrao Dutt Sharma(also known as Umrao Dutt Ved) was a Vaidya by profession and also a member of the freedom fighter from Baraut in Indian Independence Movement. Umrao Dutt Sharma was highly respected and dominance in the Baghpat and Baraut assembly constituencies at that time in politics. Umrao Dutt Sharma (also known as Umrao Dutt Ved) retired from active politics in 1957, but his political dominance in the Baghpat and Baraut assembly constituencies continued till 1977..The people of Baghpat and Baraut region continued to elect the candidates which was supported by him. With Umrao Dutt Sharma support, Acharya Dipankar in 1952, Raghubir Singh in 1957, Shaukat Hameed Khan in 1962, Acharya Dipankar in 1967, Chaudhary Vikram Singh in 1969, Satyapal Malik in 1974, Ismail in 1977 became MLA.. In 1977, Umrao Dutt Sharma died. After his death there was a change waves in local politics and In 1985 Chaudhary Charan Singh strengthened its hold in this area. After the "Delimitation of Parliamentary and Assembly Constituencies Order, 2008" was passed in 2008, the constituency was assigned identification number 52.Yogesh Dhama is current MLA, hailing from the BJP and won by margin of 31,360 votes in 2017 elections, and also won in 2022 assembly elections.

== Wards / Areas ==
Extent of Baghpat Assembly constituency is Khekra Tehsil; KC Pilana, PCs Baghpat, Pali, Pawla Bagamabad, Tatiri of Baghpat KC, Baghpat MB, Aminagar Sarai NP & Agarwal Mandi NP of Baghpat Tehsil.

== Members of the Legislative Assembly ==
Year	Member	Party
1952	Acharya Dipanker	Communist Party of India
1957	Raghubir Singh	Indian National Congress
1962	Shaukat Hameed Khan	Indian National Congress
1967	Acharya Dipanker	Communist Party of India
1969	Chaudhry Vikram Singh	Indian National Congress
1974	Satya Pal Malik	Bharatiya Kranti Dal
1977	Ismail	Janata Party
1980	Mahesh Chand	Indian National Congress (Indira)
1985	Kaukab Hameed Khan	Indian National Congress
1989	Sahab Singh	Janata Dal
1991	Mahendra Jan	Janata Dal
1993	Kaukab Hameed Khan	Indian National Congress
1996	Kaukab Hameed Khan	Bharatiya Kisan Kamgar Party
2002	Kaukab Hameed Khan	Rashtriya Lok Dal
2007	Kaukab Hameed Khan	Rashtriya Lok Dal
2012	Hemlata Chaudhary	Bahujan Samaj Party
2017	Yogesh Dhama	Bharatiya Janata Party
2022	Yogesh Dhama	Bharatiya Janata Party

== Election results ==
=== 2027 ===
2027 Uttar Pradesh Legislative Assembly election: Bagpat
Party	Candidate	Votes	%	±%
INDIA				
NDA				
BSP				
NOTA	None of the above			
Majority				
Turnout				
gain from		Swing		

=== 2022 ===
2022 Uttar Pradesh Legislative Assembly election: Baghpat
Party	Candidate	Votes	%	±%
BJP	Yogesh Dhama	101,420	47.37	▲0.76
RLD	Muhammad Ahmed Hameed	94,687	44.22	▲33.27
BSP	Arun Kasana	12,863	6.01	▼24.81
NOTA	None of the above	574	0.27	▼0.21
Majority		6,733	3.15	▼12.64
Turnout		214,112	67.7	▲1.79
BJP hold		Swing		

=== 2017 ===
2017 Uttar Pradesh Legislative Assembly election: Baghpat
Party	Candidate	Votes	%	±%
BJP	Yogesh Dhama	92,566	46.61	
BSP	Muhammad Ahmed Hameed	61,206	30.82	
RLD	Kartar Singh Bhadana	21,751	10.95	
INC	Dr Kuldeep Ujjwal	19,091	9.61	
NOTA	None of the above	954	0.48	
Majority		31,360	15.79	
Turnout		198,613	65.91	
BJP gain from BSP		Swing		

=== 2012 ===
2012 Uttar Pradesh Legislative Assembly election: Baghpat
Party	Candidate	Votes	%	±%
BSP	Hemlata Chaudhary	56,957	34.54	−
RLD	Kawkab Hameed Khan	49,294	29.9	−
SP	Sahab Singh	41,584	25.22	−
	Remainder 11 candidates	17,047	10.33	−
Majority		7,663	4.65	−
Turnout		164,882	62.58	−
BSP gain from RLD		Swing		

== See also ==
- Bagpat district
- Sixteenth Legislative Assembly of Uttar Pradesh
- Uttar Pradesh Legislative Assembly
