= Raju Yadav =

Indian politician

Rajkumar Yadav Also known as Raju Yadav

Member of the Legislative Assembly, Uttar Pradesh Legislative Assembly
- In office March 2012 – March 2022
- Preceded by: Ashok Singh Chauhan
- Constituency: Mainpuri (Assembly constituency)

Personal details
- Born: 27 December 1969 (age 56) Firozabad, Uttar Pradesh, India
- Party: Samajwadi Party
- Spouse: Vandana Yadav
- Children: Rishi Raj Yadav; Shaurya Raj Yadav
- Parent: Chandrapal Singh (father)
- Education: Agra University
- Profession: Farmer, businessperson and politician

Rajkumar Yadav, also known as Raju Yadav, is an Indian politician and a former member of the 16th and 17th Legislative Assemblies of Uttar Pradesh. He represented the Mainpuri constituency as a member of the Samajwadi Party.

== Early life and education ==
Rajkumar Yadav was born in Firozabad district, Uttar Pradesh. He studied at Narayan College, affiliated with Agra University.

== Political career ==
Rajkumar Yadav served as a Member of the Legislative Assembly from the Mainpuri constituency for two consecutive terms as a candidate of the Samajwadi Party.

== Posts held ==
#	From	To	Position	Comments
01	March 2012	March 2017	Member, 16th Legislative Assembly	
02	March 2017	March 2022	Member, 17th Legislative Assembly	

== See also ==
- Mainpuri (Assembly constituency)
- Sixteenth Legislative Assembly of Uttar Pradesh
- Uttar Pradesh Legislative Assembly
