= Ram Naresh Agnihotri =

Indian politician (born 1957)

Minister of Excise and Liquor Prohibition, Government of Uttar Pradesh
- In office 21 August 2019 – 25 March 2022
- Chief Minister: Yogi Adityanath
- Preceded by: Jai Pratap Singh
- Succeeded by: Nitin Agrawal

Member of Uttar Pradesh Legislative Assembly
- Incumbent
- Assumed office 11 March 2017
- Preceded by: Alok Kumar Shakya
- Constituency: Bhongaon

Personal details
- Born: 27 May 1957 (age 69) Mainpuri, Uttar Pradesh, India
- Party: Bharatiya Janata Party
- Spouse: Kalpana Agnihotri (m. 1986)
- Children: 6 (2 sons and 4 daughters)
- Parent: Om Prakash Agnihotri
- Education: Bachelor of Laws
- Profession: Politician

Ram Naresh Agnihotri is an Indian politician and a member of 18th Uttar Pradesh Assembly and also 17th Legislative Assembly of Uttar Pradesh of India. He represents the Bhongaon (Assembly constituency) in Mainpuri district of Uttar Pradesh and is a member of the Bharatiya Janata Party.

== Early life and education ==
Agnihotri was born 27 May 1957 in Mainpuri, Uttar Pradesh to his father Om Prakash Agnihotri. He belongs to Brahmin community. In 1986, he married Kalpana Agnihotri, they have two sons and four daughters. In 1978, he had completed Bachelor of Laws education from Kanyakubja Degree College University Lucknow.

== Political career ==
Agnihotri has been MLA for two terms. Since 2017, he represents Bhongaun constituency as a member of Bhartiya Janata Party. In 2017 Uttar Pradesh Legislative Assembly election, he defeated Samajwadi Party candidate Alok Kumar Shakya by a margin of 20,297 votes. He is second candidate for Bhartiya Janta Party who registered win on Bhongaon (Assembly constituency), first was Shivraj Singh Chauhan (P.T.I.).

He has been appointed Cabinet minister in Yogi Adityanath cabinet on 21 August 2019. He got departments of Excise, Liquor Prohibition, formerly held by Health Minister Jai Pratap Singh.

== Posts held ==
#	From	To	Position	Comments
1	March 2017	March 2022	Member, 17th Legislative Assembly of Uttar Pradesh	
2	August 2019	March 2022	Cabinet Minister for Excise, Liquor Prohibition	
3	March 2022	Incumbent	Member, 18th Uttar Pradesh Assembly	
