= Jaiveer Singh =

Indian politician

Minister of Tourism & Culture Government of Uttar Pradesh
- Incumbent
- Assumed office 25 March 2022
- Chief Minister: Yogi Adityanath
- Preceded by: Neelkanth Tiwari
- Constituency: Mainpuri

Member of the Uttar Pradesh Legislative Assembly
- Incumbent
- Assumed office 25 March 2022
- In office 2002–2012

Personal details
- Born: 2 October 1958 (age 68)
- Party: Bharatiya Janata Party
- Spouse: Reeta Singh
- Children: Atul Pratap Singh; Sumit Pratap Singh; Gunjan Singh
- Profession: Politician
- Website: www.jaiveersingh.net

Jaiveer Singh (born 2 October 1958) is an Indian politician and member of the 18th Uttar Pradesh Legislative Assembly. He is affiliated with Bharatiya Janata Party and represents the Mainpuri Sadar Constituency of Uttar Pradesh. He was appointed the Minister of Tourism & Culture in the Government of Uttar Pradesh. He entered politics in 1984 & after that, he was elected as MLA from Ghiror in 2002 and appointed Uttar Pradesh State Minister (Medical & Health) in 2003. He completed his tenure by 2006. He served as Minister of State with Independent Charge for Irrigation Department in the Government of Uttar Pradesh from 2007 to 2012. He represents a near depressed, stressed faction of State politics.

== Early life ==
Jaiveer Singh was born on 2 October 1958 in the village Karhara, district Firozabad (Erstwhile District Mainpuri). He belongs to Jadon clan of Kshatriya community. Inspired by his father's ideas of social harmony, his interest in the political field increased. He started working in Youth Congress in student life. After entering student politics, he participated in various movements as an active politician and was elected as an MLA for the first time in 2002.

== Political background ==
Jaiveer Singh is the Minister of Tourism & Culture in the Government of Uttar Pradesh. After entering politics, he has been the president of Aaron Block from 1984 to 1989 & has been the village Pradhan of the Karhara Village from 1988 to 1995. He worked as General Secretary of the district Congress Committee from 1989 to 1994. After that, he worked as Vice President of the Youth Congress Committee from 1994 to 1996. He spent three tenures as the president of District Co-operative Bank Firozabad from 1999 to 2008. He has been the MLA of Ghiror Mainpuri from 2002 to 2012. In 2003 he was appointed State Minister (Medical & Health) & then, he was appointed the Minister of State with Independent Charge for the Department of Irrigation in the Government of Uttar Pradesh from 2007 to 2012. He was elected as MLA from Mainpuri Sadar, Mainpuri & working as the Minister of Tourism & Culture in the Government of Uttar Pradesh.

== Political career ==
S.No	Office	Constituency	Year
1	Member of the Legislative Assembly, Uttar Pradesh Legislative Assembly	Mainpuri Sadar	2022
2	Member of the Legislative Assembly, Uttar Pradesh Legislative Assembly	Ghiraur Mainpuri	2007
3	Member of the Legislative Assembly, Uttar Pradesh Legislative Assembly	Ghiraur Mainpuri	2002

== Positions held ==
S.No	Position	Tenure
1	Cabinet Minister, Uttar Pradesh Council of Ministers	2022
