= Phaphamau =

- town
- Location in Uttar Pradesh, India
- Coordinates: 25°32′02″N 81°51′14″E
- Country: India
- State: Uttar Pradesh
- District: Prayagraj

Government
  - Type: Nagar Nigam, Prayagraj

Languages
  - Official: Hindi
- Time zone: UTC+5:30 (IST)
- PIN: 211013
- Nearest city: Teliarganj
- Lok Sabha constituency: Phulpur
- Vidhan Sabha constituency: Phaphamau

Phaphamau is a satellite locality/township of the city of Prayagraj, Uttar Pradesh, India, located on either side of Prayagraj-Lucknow highway. It lies on the banks of the Ganga River.Phaphamu was ruled by Bhil king

== History ==
During the 1857 uprising, a temple in Phaphamau was used for anti-British activities. It was later destroyed by British, and the temple leader was hanged.

The old Temple of Lord Shankar ji, which is located in village Pandila, which is also called Pandeshwer Nath Dham. This temple is 5 km from Phaphamau.

== Education ==
Devprayag day boarding school Nursery to XII std, Devprayag Institute of Technical Studies (Engineering college), Devprayag Institute of Management (MBA college), Shyama Prasad Mukherjee Government Degree College (SPMGDC), Ganga Gurukulam School, School Of wisdom, Shiv Ganga Vidya Mandir, and "Hartmann Ganj" Christian school are all located in Gaddopur, Phaphamau. Uttar Pradesh Rajarshi Tondon Open University is also situated here in Sector E shantipuram. There is also a homeopathic medical college situated in Shantipuram colony of Phaphamau.

== Transport ==
The town has an old airport which was operated by Royal Indian Airforce during the 2nd world war. This airport is located in Padilla. The airstrip is now abandoned.

There is also Phaphamau railway station which comes in the Northern Zone.

Phaphamau is well connected by road and railway.
