= Bhongaon Assembly constituency =

Constituency of the Uttar Pradesh legislative assembly in India

Bhongaon
- Constituency No. 108 for the Uttar Pradesh Legislative Assembly

Constituency details
- Country: India
- Region: North India
- State: Uttar Pradesh
- District: Mainpuri
- Total electors: 290,766 (2012)
- Reservation: None

Member of Legislative Assembly
- 18th Uttar Pradesh Legislative Assembly
- Incumbent Ram Naresh Agnihotri
- Party: Bharatiya Janata Party
- Elected year: 2017

Bhongaon Assembly constituency is one of the 403 constituencies of the Uttar Pradesh Legislative Assembly, India. It is a part of the Mainpuri district and one of the four assembly constituencies in the Mainpuri Lok Sabha constituency. First election in this assembly constituency was held in 1957 after the "DPACO (1956)" (delimitation order) was passed in 1956. After the "Delimitation of Parliamentary and Assembly Constituencies Order" was passed in 2008, the constituency was assigned identification number 108. Since 1956, this constituency has ceased and has been created several times.

== Wards / Areas ==
Extent of Bhongaon Assembly constituency is KCs Alipur Patti, Bhongaon, Bewar, Bhongaon NP & Bewar NP of Bhongaon Tehsil.

== Members of the Legislative Assembly ==
| # | Term | Name | Party | From | To | Days | Comments | Ref |
|---|---|---|---|---|---|---|---|---|
| 01 | 01st Vidhan Sabha | – | – | Mar-1952 | Mar-1957 | 1,849 | Constituency not in existence | |
| 02 | 02nd Vidhan Sabha | Ganesh Chandra | Indian National Congress | Apr-1957 | Mar-1962 | 1,800 | – | |
| 03 | 03rd Vidhan Sabha | Subedar Singh | Indian National Congress | Mar-1962 | Mar-1967 | 1,828 | – | |
| 04 | 04th Vidhan Sabha | Jagdish Narain Tripathi | Communist Party of India | Mar-1967 | Apr-1968 | 402 | – | |
| 05 | 05th Vidhan Sabha | Subedar Singh | Bharatiya Kranti Dal | Feb-1969 | Mar-1974 | 1,832 | – | |
| 06 | 06th Vidhan Sabha | Jagdish Narain Tripathi | Communist Party of India | Mar-1974 | Apr-1977 | 1,153 | – | |
| 07 | 07th Vidhan Sabha | – | – | Jun-1977 | Feb-1980 | 969 | Constituency not in existence | |
| 08 | 08th Vidhan Sabha | – | – | Jun-1980 | Mar-1985 | 1,735 | Constituency not in existence | |
| 09 | 09th Vidhan Sabha | Shiv Bachh Singh | Indian National Congress | Mar-1985 | Nov-1989 | 1,725 | – | |
| 10 | 10th Vidhan Sabha | Shivraj singh chauhan (P.T.I) | Bharatiya Janata Party | Dec-1989 | Apr-1991 | 488 | Constituency not in existence | |
| 11 | 11th Vidhan Sabha | Ram Autar Shakya | Janata Party (Secular) | Jun-1991 | Dec-1992 | 533 | – | |
| 12 | 12th Vidhan Sabha | Upadesh Singh Chauhan | Samajwadi Party | Dec-1993 | Oct-1995 | 693 | – | |
| 13 | 13th Vidhan Sabha | Ram Autar Shakya | Samajwadi Party | Oct-1996 | May-2002 | 1,967 | – | |
| 14 | 14th Vidhan Sabha | Alok Kumar Shakya | Samajwadi Party | Feb-2002 | May-2007 | 1,902 | – | |
| 15 | 15th Vidhan Sabha | Alok Kumar Shakya | Samajwadi Party | May-2007 | Mar-2012 | 1,762 | – | |
| 16 | 16th Vidhan Sabha | Alok Kumar Shakya | Samajwadi Party | Mar-2012 | Mar-2017 | 1,829 | – | |
| 17 | 17th Vidhan Sabha | Ram Naresh Agnihotri | Bharatiya Janata Party | March 2017 | March 2022 | | | |
| 18 | 18th Vidhan Sabha | Ram Naresh Agnihotri | Bharatiya Janata Party | March 2022 | Incumbent | | | |

== Election results ==
=== 2027 ===
2027 Uttar Pradesh Legislative Assembly election: Bhongaon
| Party | Candidate | Votes | % | ±% |
|---|---|---|---|---|
| INDIA | | | | |
| NDA | | | | |
| BSP | | | | |
| NOTA | None of the above | | | |
| Majority | | | | |
| Turnout | | | | |
| gain from | | Swing | | |

=== 2022 ===
2022 Uttar Pradesh Legislative Assembly election: Bhongaon
| Party | Candidate | Votes | % | ±% |
|---|---|---|---|---|
| BJP | Ram Naresh Agnihotri | 97,208 | 45.18 | ▼2.18 |
| SP | Alok Kumar Shakya | 92,441 | 42.97 | ▲5.98 |
| BSP | Ashok Kumar | 14,150 | 6.58 | ▼6.72 |
| Jan Adhikar Party | Bhupendra Singh | 4,214 | 1.96 | |
| INC | Mamta Rajput | 2,121 | 0.99 | |
| NOTA | None of the above | 906 | 0.42 | ▼0.22 |
| Majority | | 4,767 | 2.21 | ▼8.16 |
| Turnout | | 215,153 | 62.62 | ▲3.49 |
| BJP hold | | Swing | | |

=== 2017 ===
2017 Uttar Pradesh Legislative Assembly Election: Bhongaon
| Party | Candidate | Votes | % | ±% |
|---|---|---|---|---|
| BJP | Ram Naresh Agnihotri | 92,697 | 47.36 | |
| SP | Alok Kumar Shakya | 72,400 | 36.99 | |
| BSP | Surendra Singh | 26,041 | 13.3 | |
| NOTA | None of the above | 1,242 | 0.64 | |
| Majority | | 20,297 | 10.37 | |
| Turnout | | 195,746 | 59.13 | |

=== 2012 ===
16th Vidhan Sabha: 2012 Elections

2012 General Elections: Bhongaon
| Party | Candidate | Votes | % | ±% |
|---|---|---|---|---|
| SP | Alok Kumar Shakya | 70,298 | 40.78 | – |
| BSP | Ashish Singh | 39,622 | 22.99 | – |
| INC | Rakesh Kumari | 26,069 | 15.12 | – |
| | Remainder 12 candidates | 36,384 | 21.1 | – |
| Majority | | 30,676 | 17.8 | – |
| Turnout | | 172,373 | 59.28 | – |
| SP hold | | Swing | | |

== See also ==
- Mainpuri district
- Mainpuri Lok Sabha constituency
- Sixteenth Legislative Assembly of Uttar Pradesh
- Uttar Pradesh Legislative Assembly
- Vidhan Bhawan
