= Phaphamau Assembly constituency =

Constituency of the Uttar Pradesh legislative assembly in India

Coordinates: 25.53°N 81.85°E

Phaphamau
- Constituency No. 254 for the Uttar Pradesh Legislative Assembly

Constituency details
- Country: India
- Region: North India
- State: Uttar Pradesh
- District: Prayagraj
- Total electors: 3,56,296 (2017)
- Reservation: None

Member of Legislative Assembly
- 18th Uttar Pradesh Legislative Assembly
- Incumbent Guru Prasad Maurya
- Party: Bharatiya Janta Party
- Elected year: 2022

Phaphamau is a constituency of the Uttar Pradesh Legislative Assembly covering the rural area of Phaphamau in Phulpur Lok Sabha constituency the Prayagraj district of Uttar Pradesh, India.

Phaphamau is one of five assembly constituencies in the Phulpur Lok Sabha constituency. Since 2008, this assembly constituency is numbered 254 amongst 403 constituencies. It was Nawabganj Assembly constituency before 2012. Delimitation Commission of 2002 abolished Nawabganj Assembly constituency and created new constituency as Phaphamau from 2012.

== Members of Vidhan Sabha ==
Year	Member	Political Party
2012	Ansar Ahmad Pahelwan	Samajwadi Party
2017	Vikramjeet Maurya	Bharatiya Janata Party
2022	Guru Prasad Maurya	Bharatiya Janata Party

== Election results ==
=== 2027 ===
2027 Uttar Pradesh Legislative Assembly election: Phaphamau
Party	Candidate	Votes	%	±%
INDIA				
NDA				
BSP				
NOTA	None of the above			
Majority				
Turnout				
gain from		Swing		

=== 2022 ===
2022 Uttar Pradesh Legislative Assembly election: Phaphamau
Party	Candidate	Votes	%	±%
BJP	Guru Prasad Maurya	91,186	43.26	▲2.71
SP	Ansar Ahmad	76,862	36.47	▲8.58
BSP	Om Prakash Patel	27,286	12.95	▼12.37
Jansatta Dal (L)	Lakshmi Narayan	2,897	1.37	
INC	Durgesh Pandey	2,391	1.13	
NOTA	None of the above	517	0.25	▼1.02
Majority		14,324	6.79	▼5.87
Turnout		210,773	57.56	▼0.05
BJP hold		Swing		

=== 2017 ===
2017 Uttar Pradesh Legislative Assembly Election: Phaphamau
Party	Candidate	Votes	%	±%
BJP	Vikramajeet Maurya	83,239	40.55	
SP	Ansar Ahmad	57,254	27.89	
BSP	Manoj Pandey	51,983	25.32	
Independent	Raj Kumar Patel	3,171	1.54	
NOTA	None of the above	2,571	1.27	
Majority		25,985	12.66	
Turnout		205,266	57.61	
