= Kaukab Hameed Khan =

Indian politician (born 1957)

Member of the Uttar Pradesh Legislative Assembly
- In office December 1993 – March 2012
- Constituency: Bagpat
- In office March 1985 – November 1989

Personal details
- Born: 1957
- Died: 2018 (aged 60–61)
- Party: Indian National Congress
- Other political affiliations: Bharatiya Kranti Dal; Rashtriya Lok Dal
- Education: Aligarh Muslim University

Kaukab Hameed Khan (1957–2018) was an Indian politician. During his career he was a member of Indian National Congress, Bharatiya Kranti Dal and Rashtriya Lok Dal parties in 2018. He died in 2018.

He represented Bagpat (Assembly constituency) in the 09th Legislative Assembly of Uttar Pradesh, 12th Legislative Assembly of Uttar Pradesh, 13th Legislative Assembly of Uttar Pradesh, 14th Legislative Assembly of Uttar Pradesh and 15th Legislative Assembly of Uttar Pradesh.
