= Badshah Gupta =

Politician from Uttar Pradesh, India

Shri Badshah Gupta was a freedom fighter and a member of parliament from Mainpuri District, Uttar Pradesh during the first (1952–57) and third (1962–67) general elections in Lok Sabha. He was also a member of the U.P. legislative assembly from 1946 to 1952. He was imprisoned from 1940 to 1941, and again in 1942 for participating in the national movement. He belonged to the Indian National Congress (INC) but later, like many loyalists of the old brigade, joined the Indian National Congress (Organisation) and fought the 1971 Lok Sabha elections on an INC(O) ticket.

== Family and education ==
Badshah Gupta was a member of the Uttar Pradesh Legislative Assembly 1946–1952, affiliated to INC serving the Manipuri Lok Sabha constituency. He was also an MP of the 1st and the 3rd Lok Sabha.

He was born in 1900, in Ram Nagar village, District Mainpuri, Uttar Pradesh, where his father Shri Jagannath Prasad was the Landlord of Ram Nagar village. Badshah Gupta lived a simple and devoted life in serving his country. He was married to Shrimati Shanti Devi in 1916, with whom he had two sons and a daughter. He was educated at Sanatan Dharam High School, in Etawah, U.P., St. John's College, Agra and at Law College, Allahabad. He held the degrees of BA and LLB. He practiced law from 1929 to 1946. He died on 12 November 1984. An obituary is referenced in the Lok Sabha dated 18 January 1985.

He held a number of positions of leadership throughout his life, including:

President, (1) D.A.V. Inter College, Jeonti, District Manipuri, (2) Sri Adarsh Vidya Mandir J. H. School, Ram Nagar, (3) District Harijan Sevak Sangh, Manipuri, (4) District Harijan Municipal Co-operative Society, Manipuri, (5) D.C.C., Manipuri; Member, P.C.C. and A.I.C.C. many times; District Convener, Bharat Sewak Samaj, Manipuri; Director, (1) District Cooperative Society Ltd., Manipuri, (2) District Cooperative Development Federation, Manipuri; Member, (1) U.P. State Warehousing Corporation, Manipuri, (2) Bharat Scouts and Guides Association, Manipuri.
