= Raghunath Singh Verma =

Indian politician

MP
- In office Twice; 5 Dec 1977; 5 Dec 1980
- Succeeded by: Bijendra Nath Verma
- Constituency: Parliament seat

Personal details
- Born: 7 September 1948 (age 77) Mainpuri, Uttar Pradesh
- Died: 20 December 2009 Jasrana
- Children: Four sons
- Salary: 15000

Raghunath Singh Verma (7 September 1948 – 20 December 2009), was an influential Indian politician involved mainly in the state affairs of Uttar Pradesh, Rajasthan, Uttarakhand, Bihar, and Madhya Pradesh. Born in Jasrana Town near Shikohabad), Mainpuri, Uttar Pradesh, he died in Jasrana in 2009.

== Political career ==
He was a member of the Vidhan Sabha of Uttar Pradesh from 1967 to 1968 and 1969–74 and was a member of the sixth and seventh Lok Sabha for Uttar Pradesh. He left politics in 1990 and worked in social services.

== Personal life ==
A farmer by birth, Singh Verma wore the simple cotton khādī in support of Mahatma Gandhi and he was a pure vegetarian. After completing his law degree, he began working as a lawyer and at the same time became involved in politics because of his patriotism.

== Caste affiliation ==
Raghunath Singh Verma was a dominant member of the Lodhi community.
