= Buddhist symbolism =

Religious symbols in Buddhism

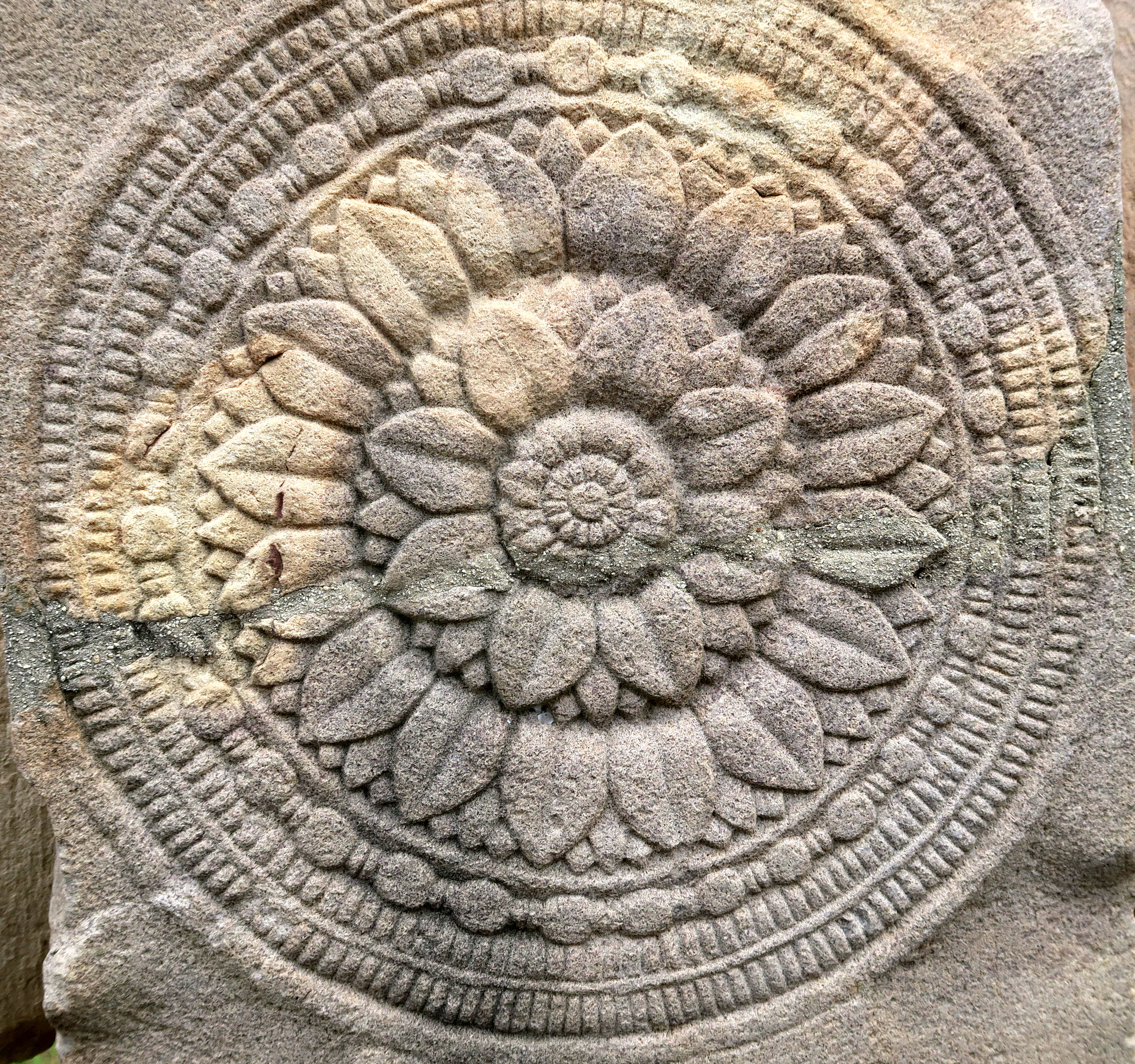
Lotus motif from Sanchi complex

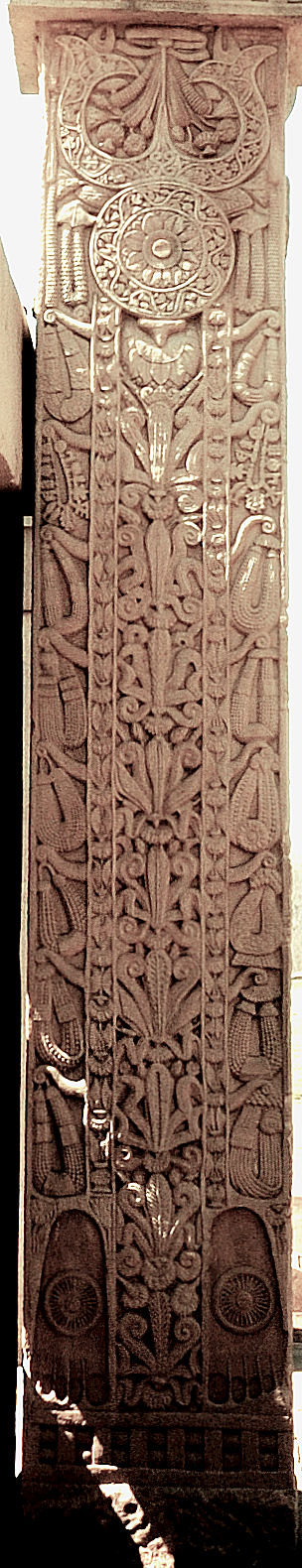
An "Indra Post" at Sanchi

Buddhist symbolism is the use of symbols (Pali: patīka) to represent certain aspects of the Buddha's Dhamma (teaching). Early Buddhist symbols which remain important today include the Dhamma wheel, the Indian lotus, the three jewels, Buddha footprint, and the Bodhi Tree.

Buddhism symbolism is intended to represent the key values of the Buddhist faith. The popularity of certain symbols has grown and changed over time as a result of the evolution of its followers' ideologies. Research has shown that the aesthetic perception of Buddhist symbols positively influenced perceived happiness and life satisfaction.

Anthropomorphic symbolism depicting the Buddha (as well as other figures) became very popular around the first century CE with the arts of Mathura and the Greco-Buddhist art of Gandhara. New symbols continued to develop into the medieval period, with Vajrayana Buddhism adopting further symbols such as the stylized double vajra. In the modern era, new symbols like the Buddhist flag were also adopted.

Many symbols are depicted in early Buddhist art. Many of these are ancient, pre-Buddhist and pan-Indian symbols of auspiciousness (mangala). According to Karlsson, Buddhists adopted these signs because "they were meaningful, important and well-known to the majority of the people in India." They also may have had apotropaic uses, and thus they "must have been a way for Buddhists to protect themselves, but also a way of popularizing and strengthening the Buddhist movement."

At its founding in 1952, the World Fellowship of Buddhists adopted two symbols to represent Buddhism. These were a traditional eight-spoked Dhamma wheel and the five-colored flag.

== Early Buddhist symbols ==
The earliest Buddhist art is from the Mauryan era (322 BCE – 184 BCE), there is little archeological evidence for pre-Mauryan period symbolism. Early Buddhist art (circa 2nd century BCE to 2nd century CE) is commonly (but not exclusively) aniconic (i.e. lacking an anthropomorphic image), and instead used various symbols to depict the Buddha. The best examples of this aniconic period symbolism can be found at sites like Sanchi, Amaravati, Bharhut, Bodhgaya and Sarnath. According to Karlsson, three specific signs, the Bodhi tree, the Dharma wheel, and the stupa, occur frequently at all these major sites and thus "the earliest Buddhist cult practice focused on these three objects".

Among the earliest and most common Buddhist symbols found in these early Buddhist sites are the stupa (and the relics therein), the Dharma wheel, the Bodhi Tree, the triratna (three jewels), the vajra seat, the lotus flower, and the Buddha footprint. Several animals are also widely depicted, such as elephants, lions, nāga and deer. Contemporary Buddhist art contains numerous symbols, including unique symbols not found in early Buddhism.

=== Gallery ===
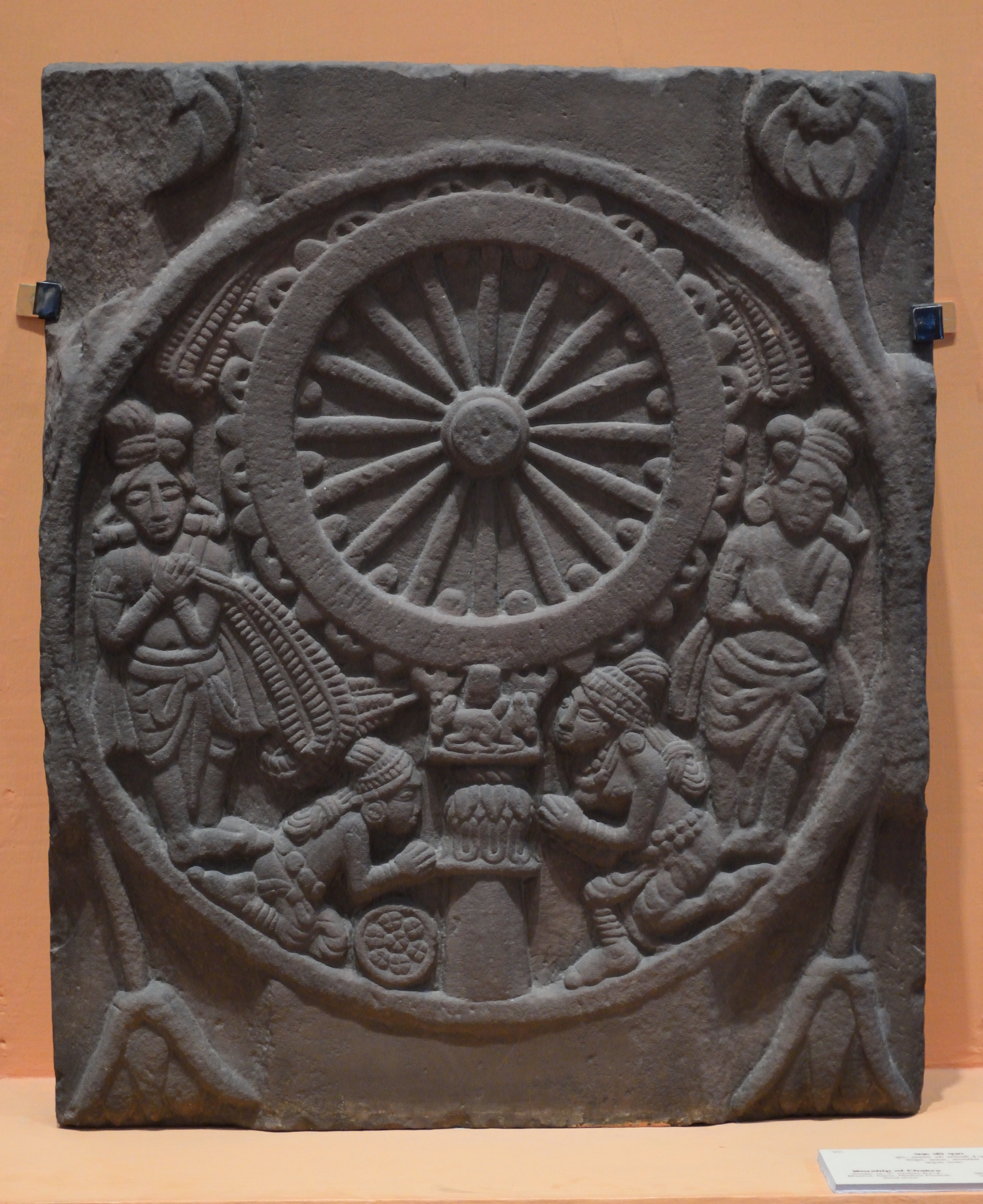
A Dharmachakra being revered

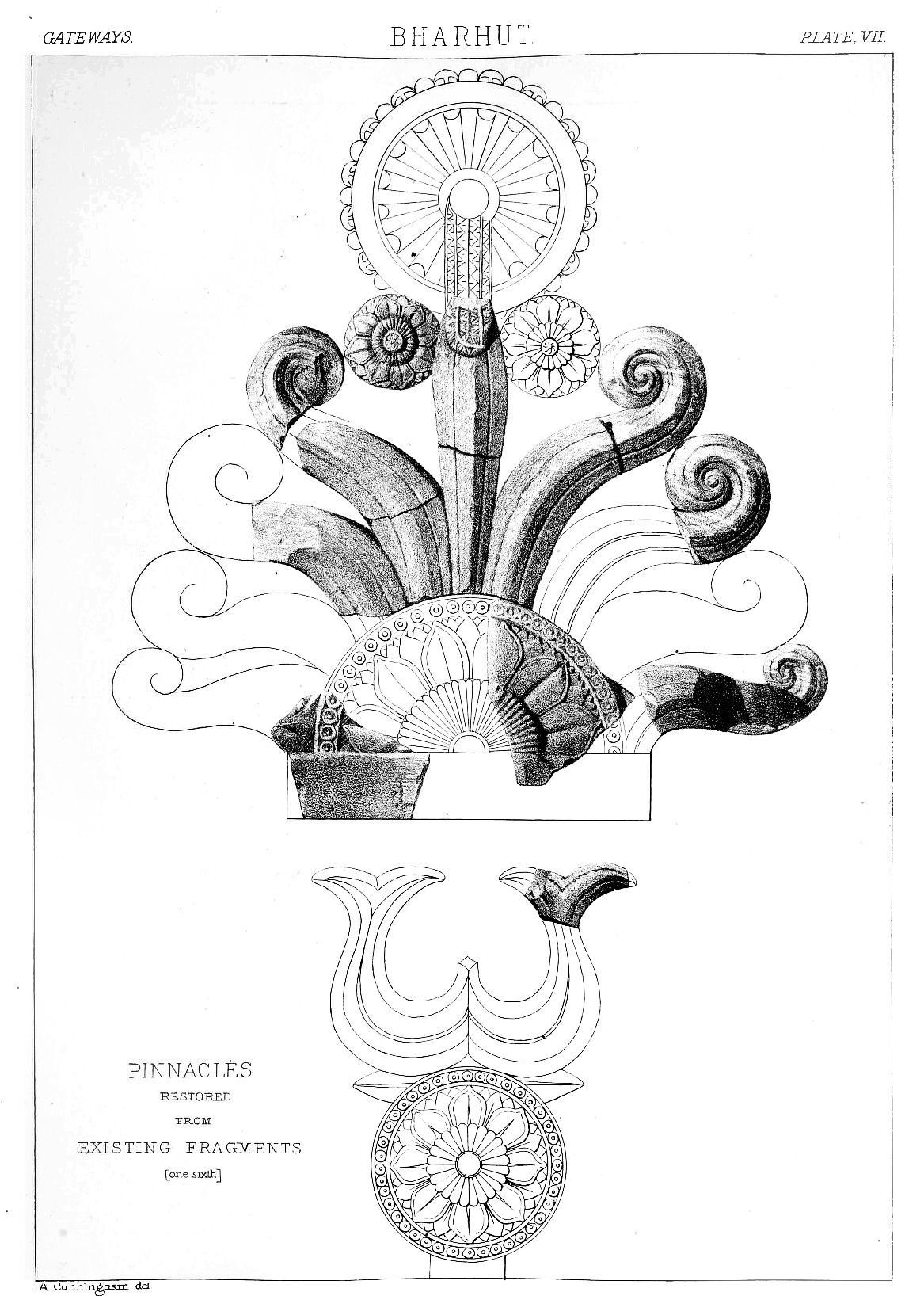
Pinnacles from Bharhut depicting Dharmawheels and Lotus roundels

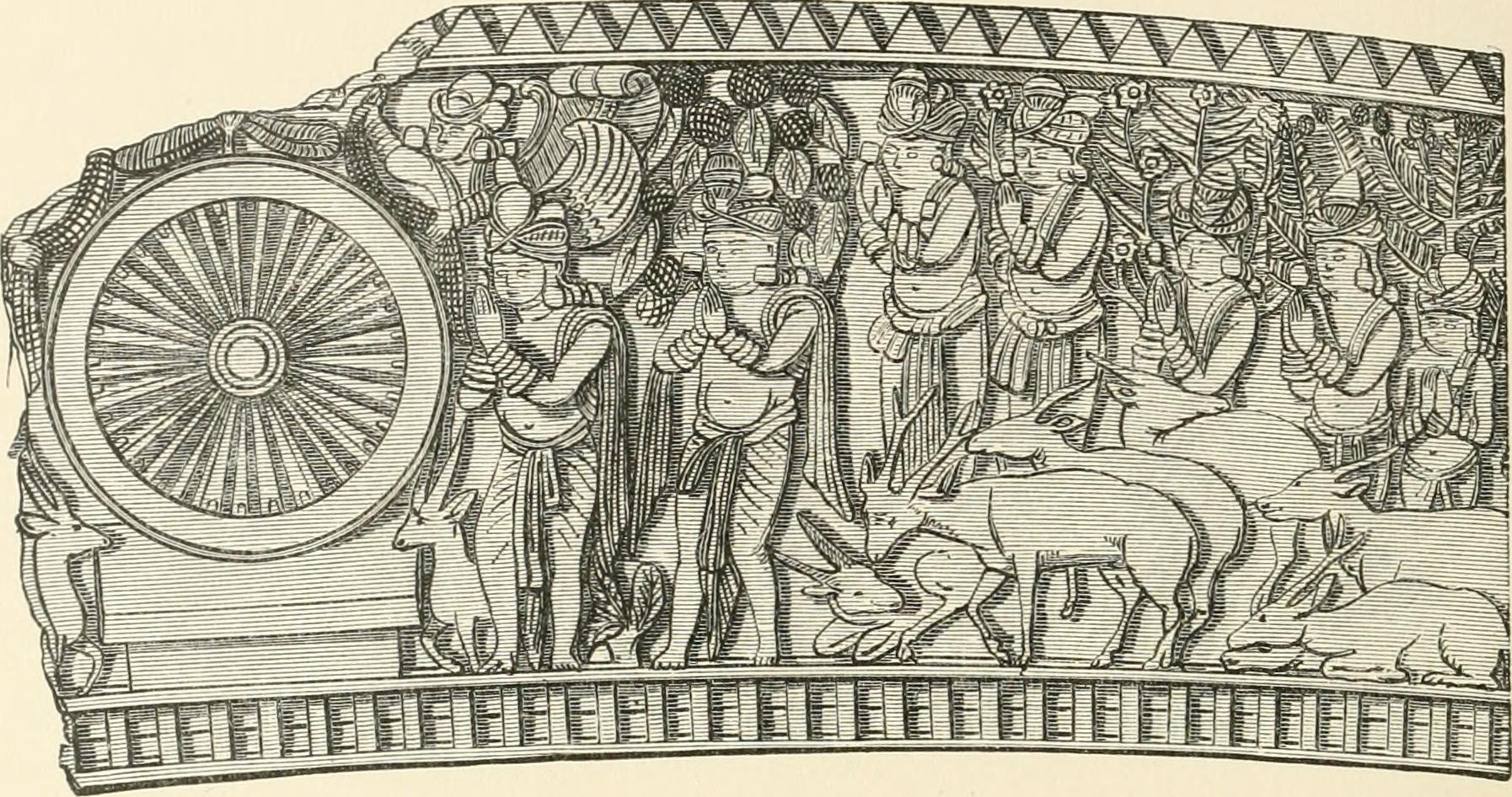
Illustrations from Sanchi, depicting a dharma chakra, devotees, and deer

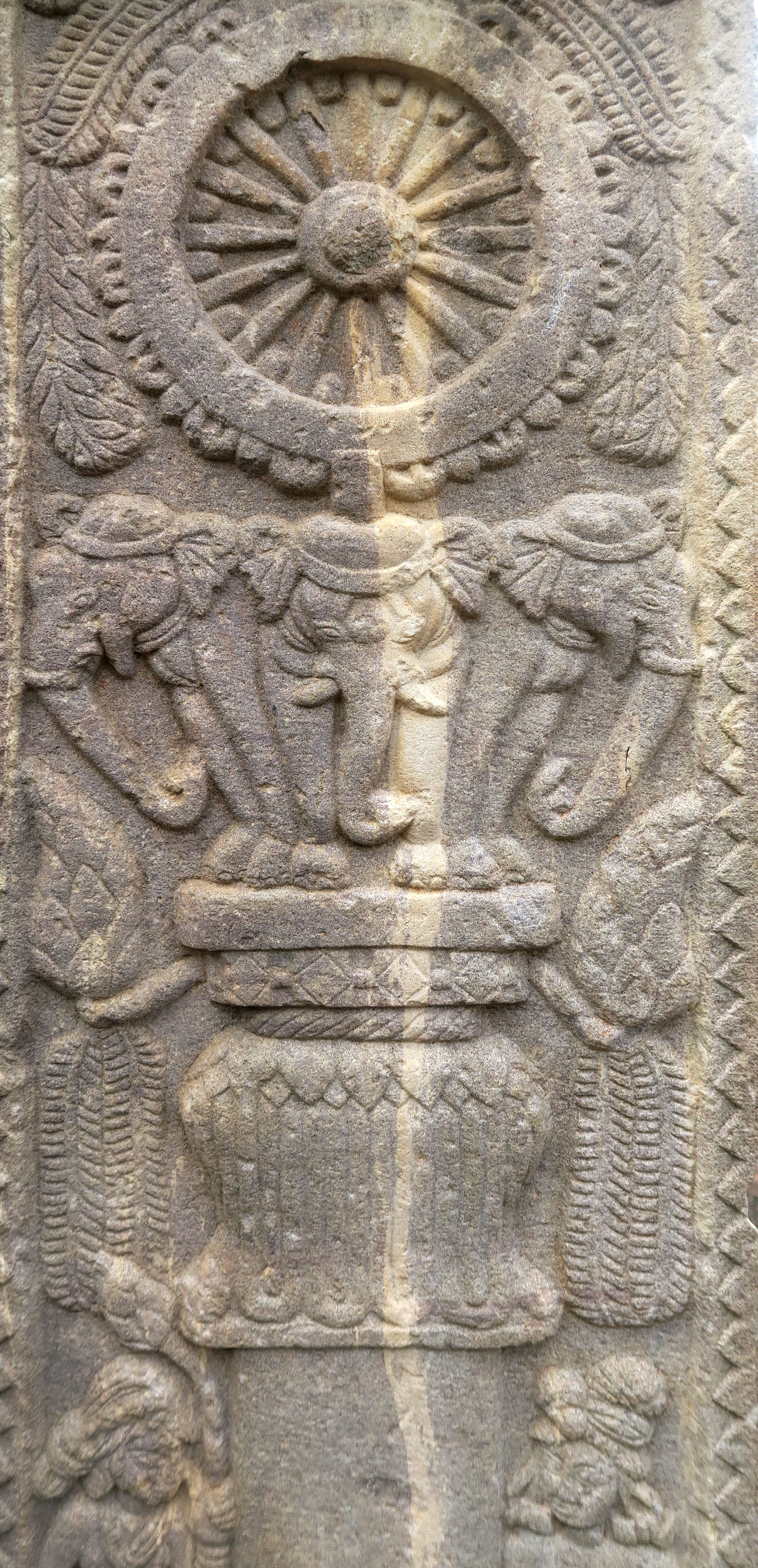
Dharmachakra, and elephants

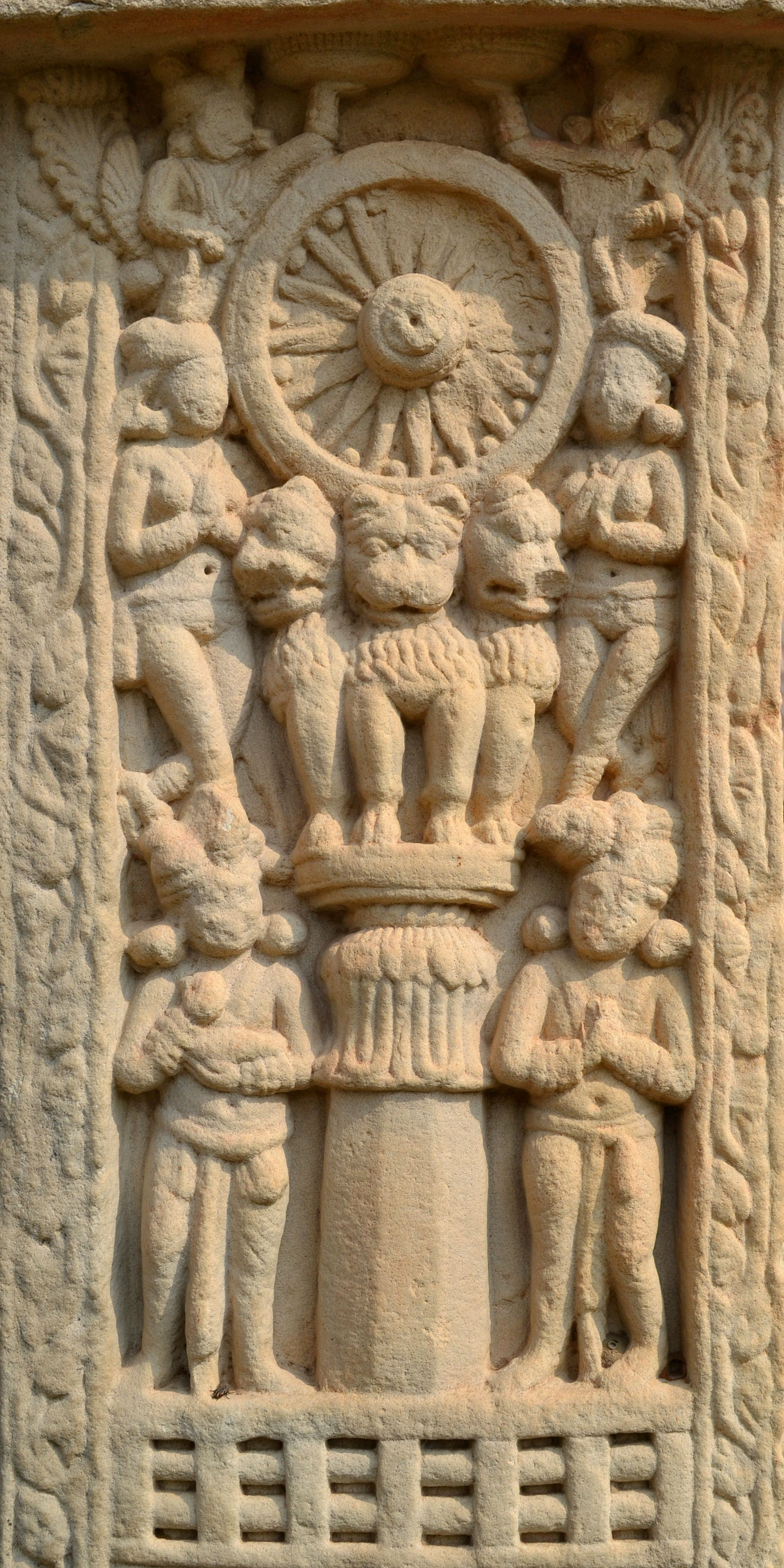
A depiction of a Dharma wheel held up by lions, one of the pillars of Ashoka

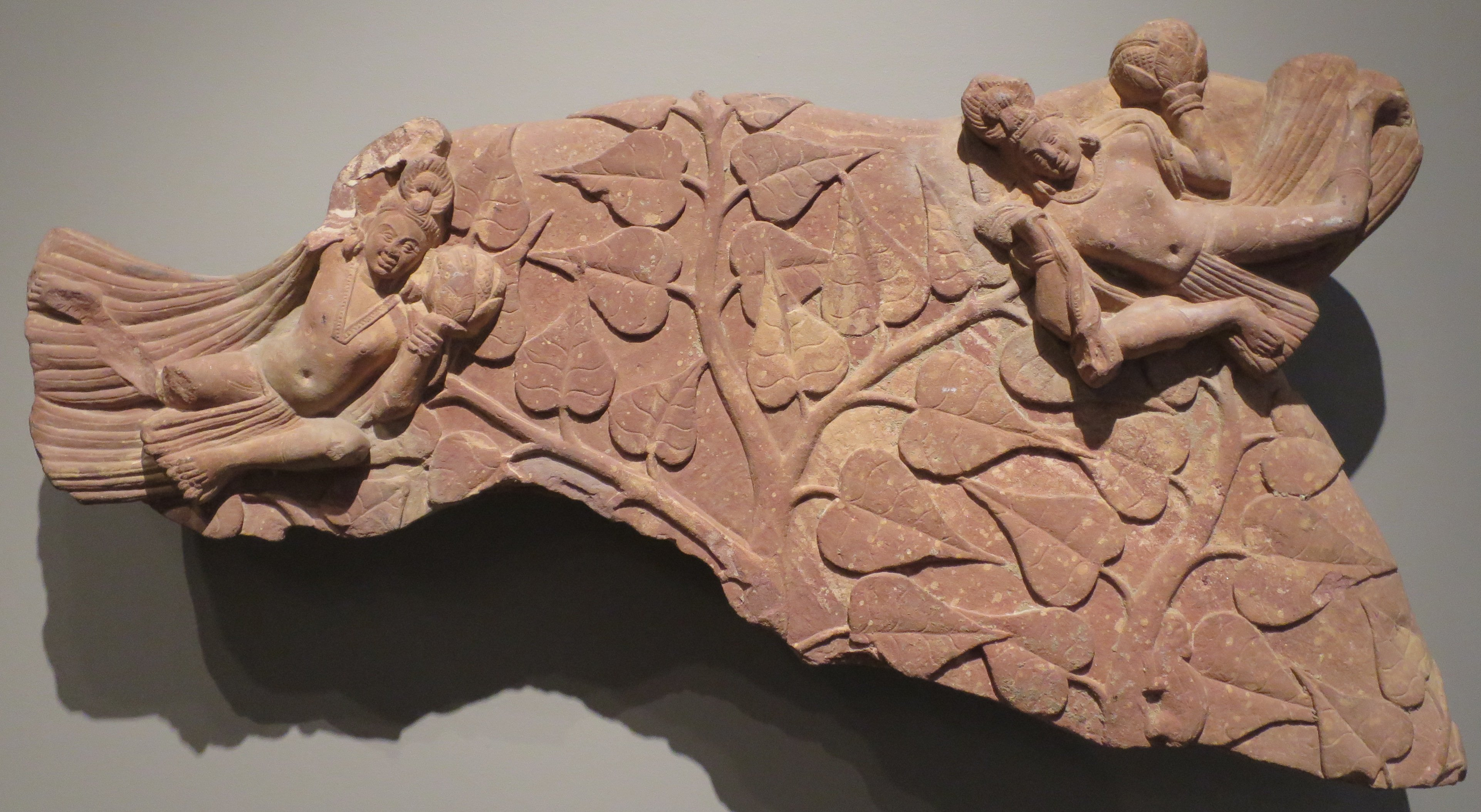
Bodhi tree showing distinctive heart-shaped leaves and devas

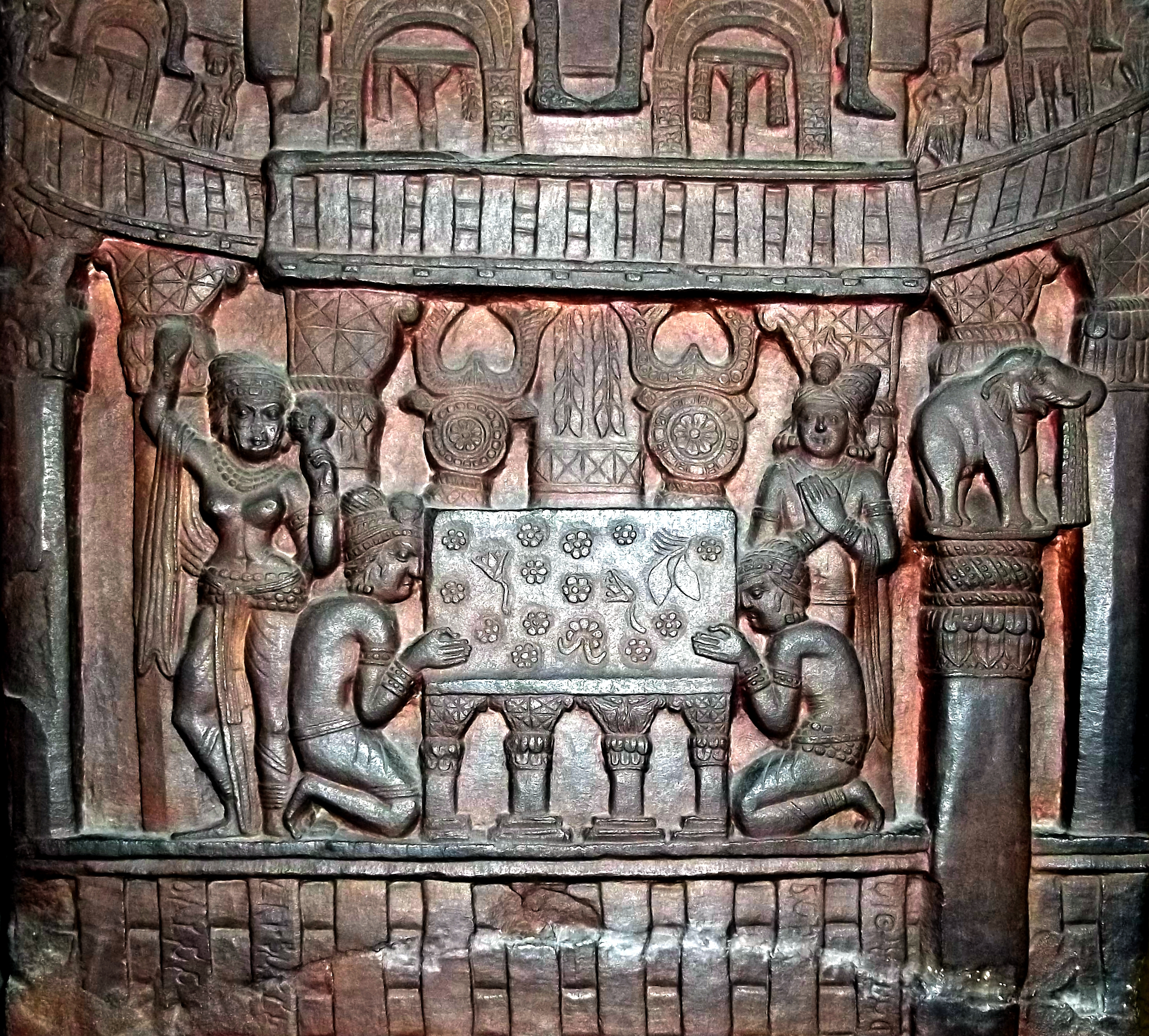
Relief of the Diamond Throne (Vajrasana) with two triratnas

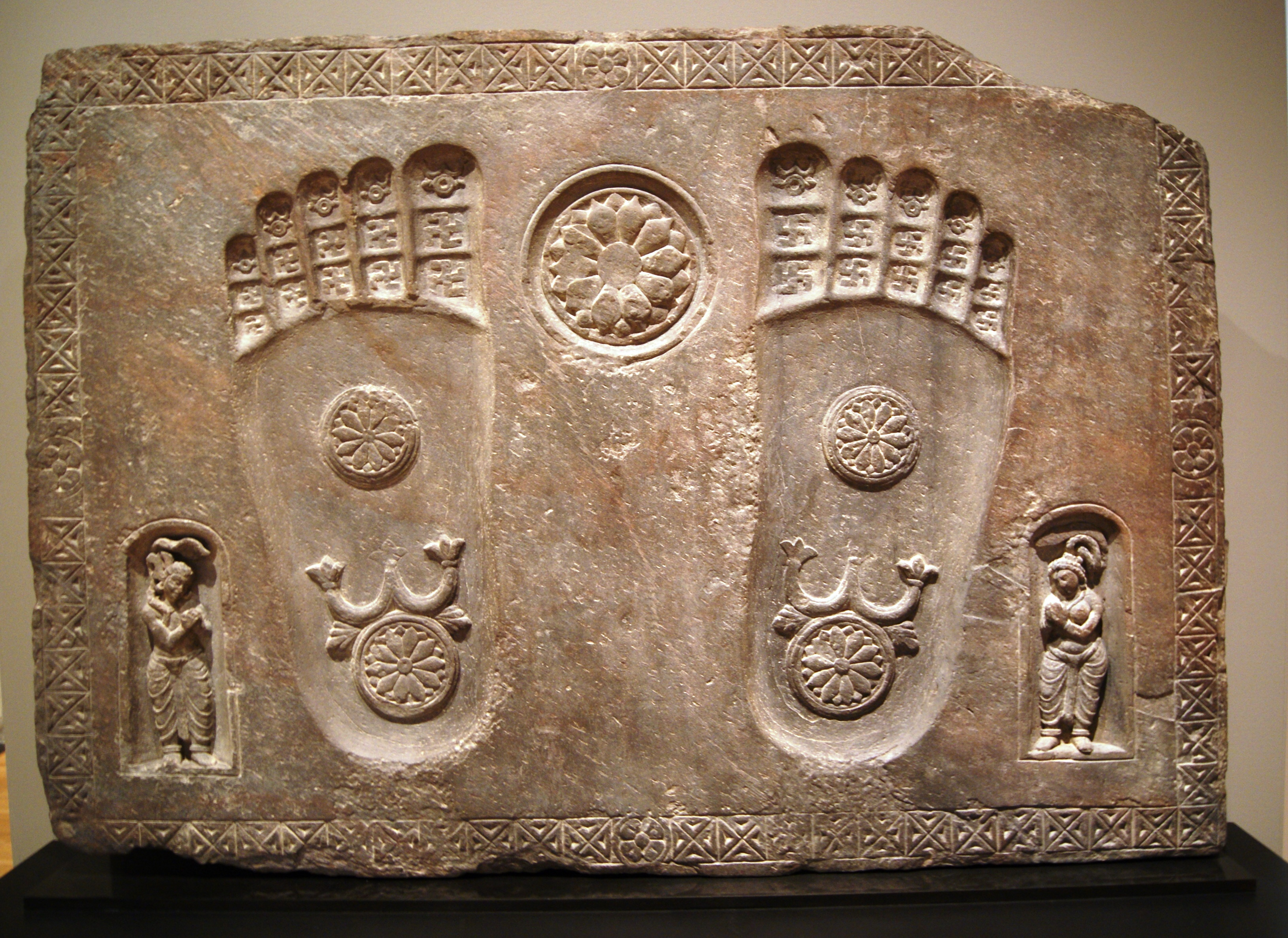
Buddhapada decorated with lotus roundels, Triratna's and swastikas, 2nd century, Gandhara

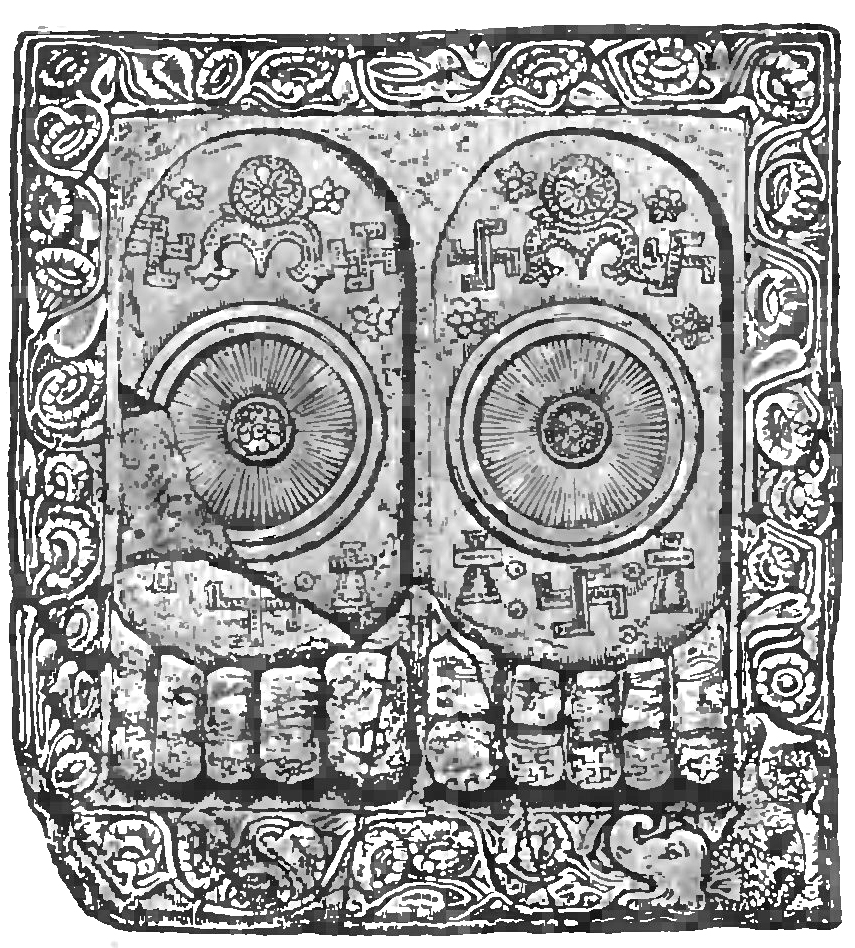
Buddhapada with other symbols

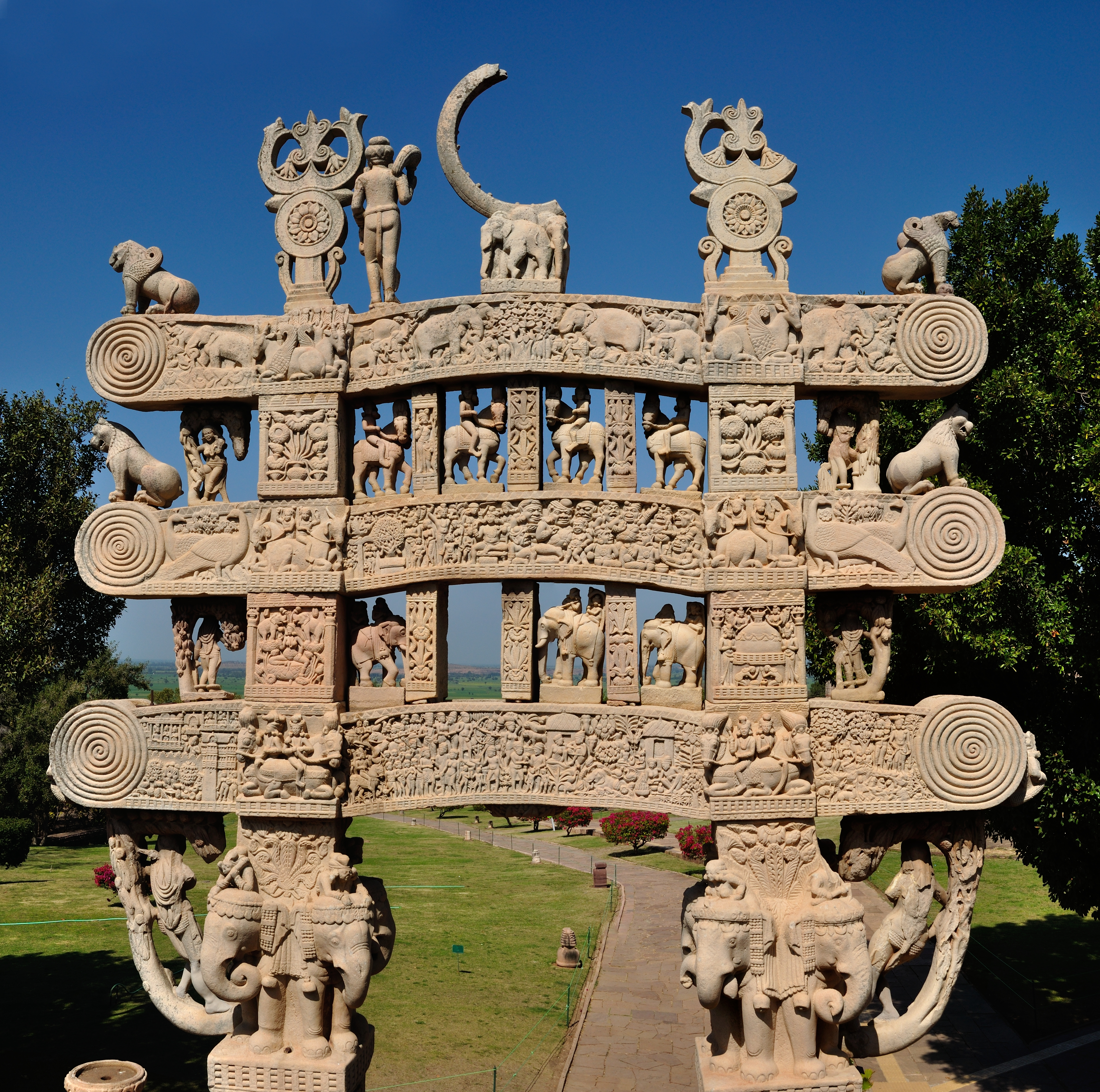
Carved decorations on the doorway of Sanchi stupa, note the dharma chakra, various animals, and Triratna (with srivasta in the center).

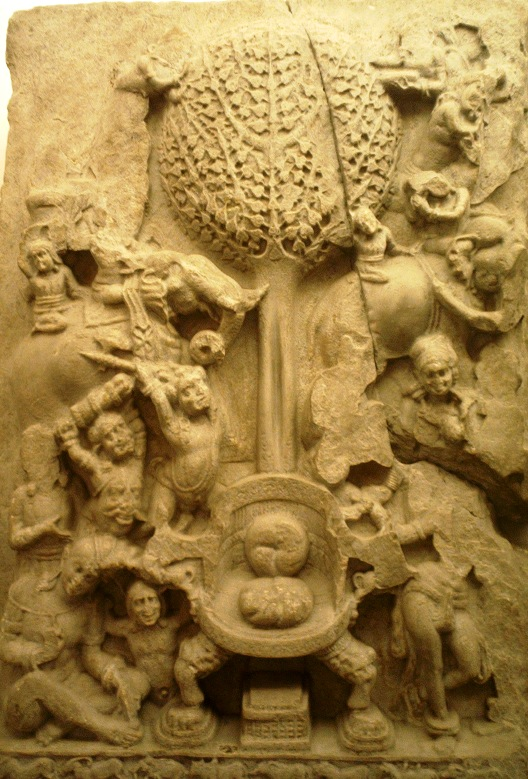
Empty throne and bodhi tree

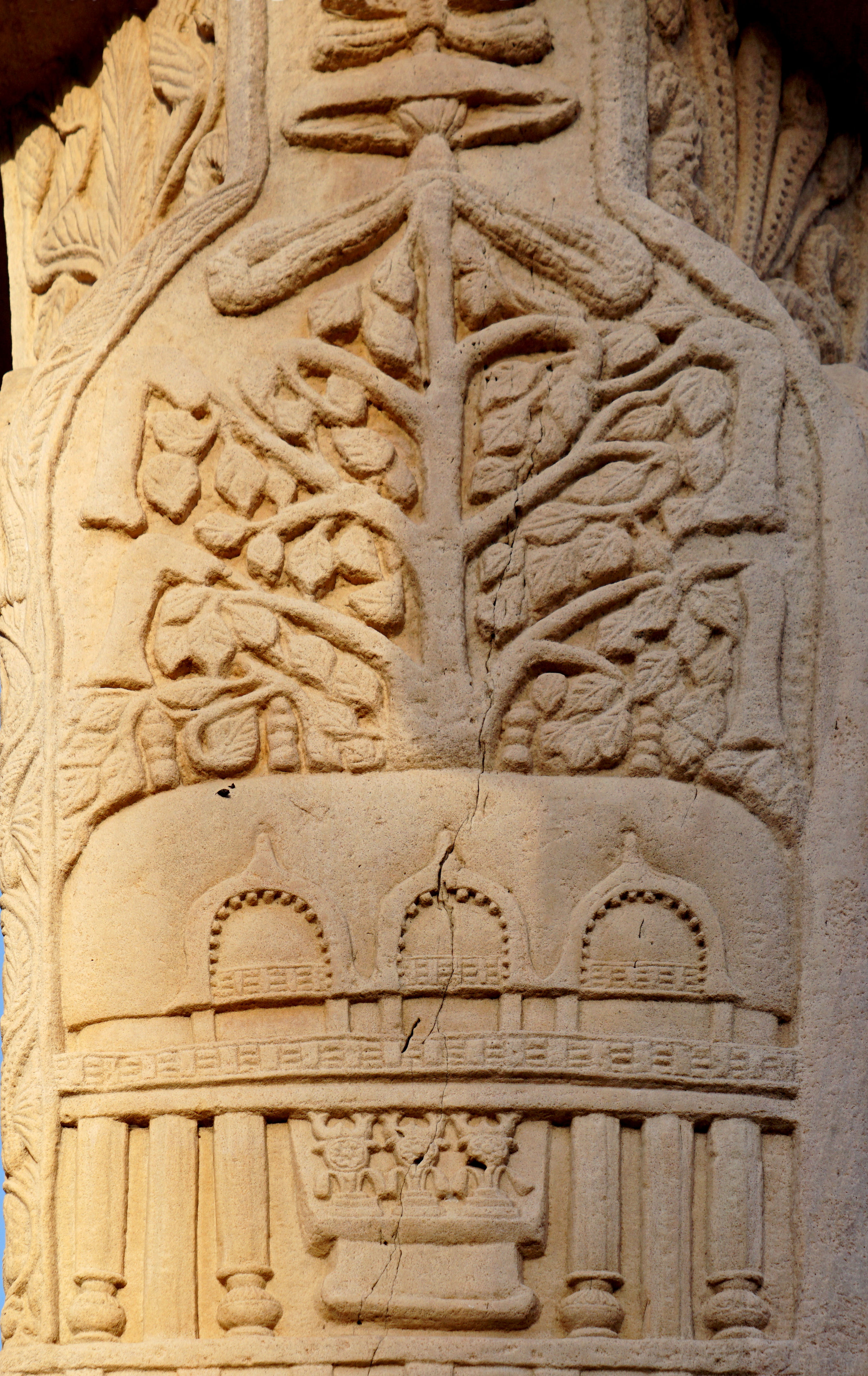
Bodhi tree with garlands, an umbrella, and Triratnas

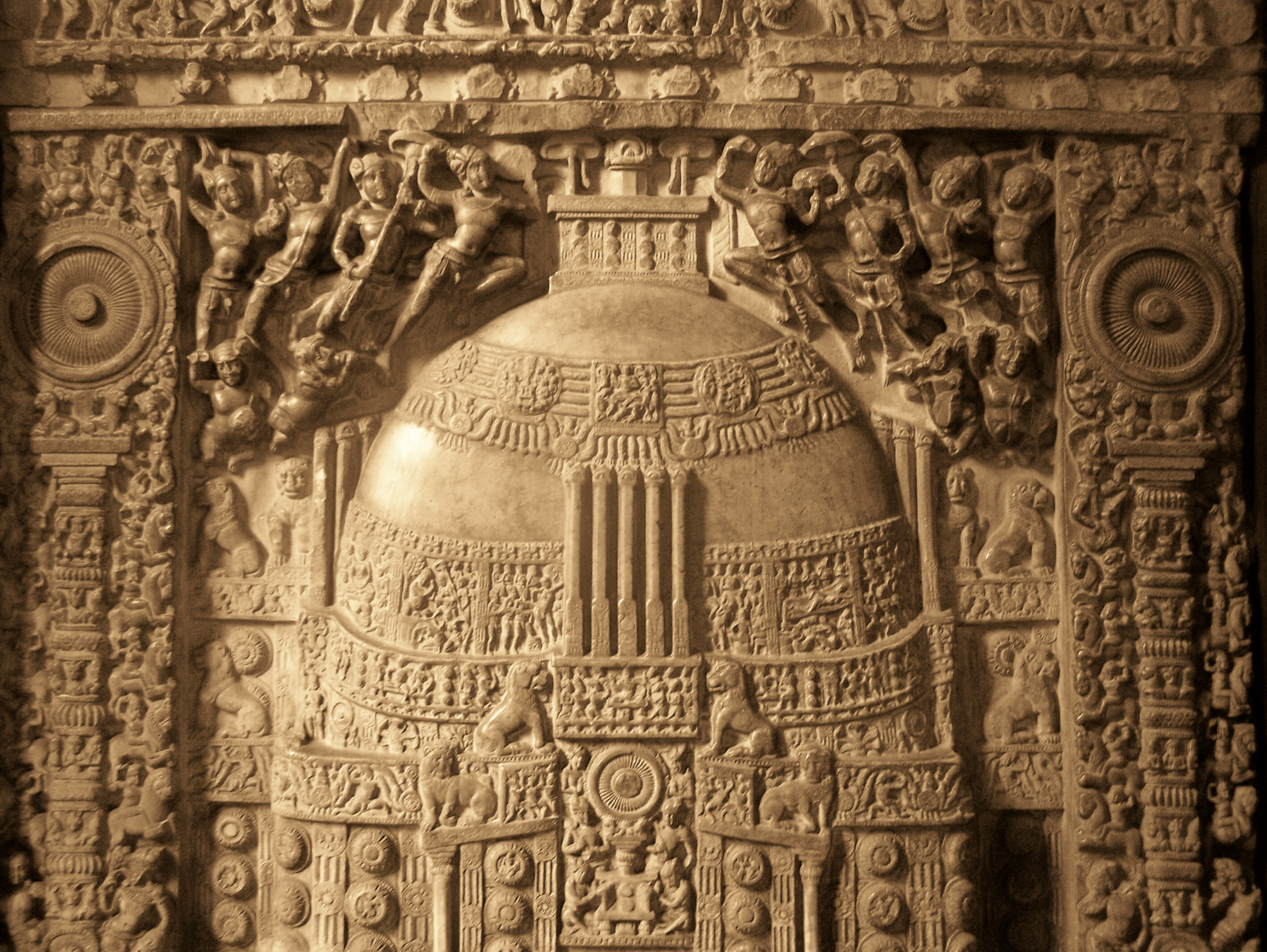
Amaravati Stupa relief with numerous early Buddhist symbols and lions

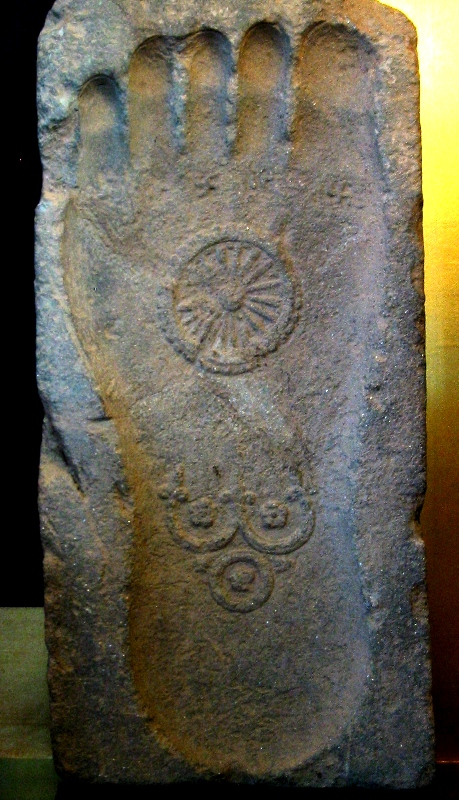
Buddha footprint. First century, Gandhara, with depictions of the triratna and the Dharmachakra.

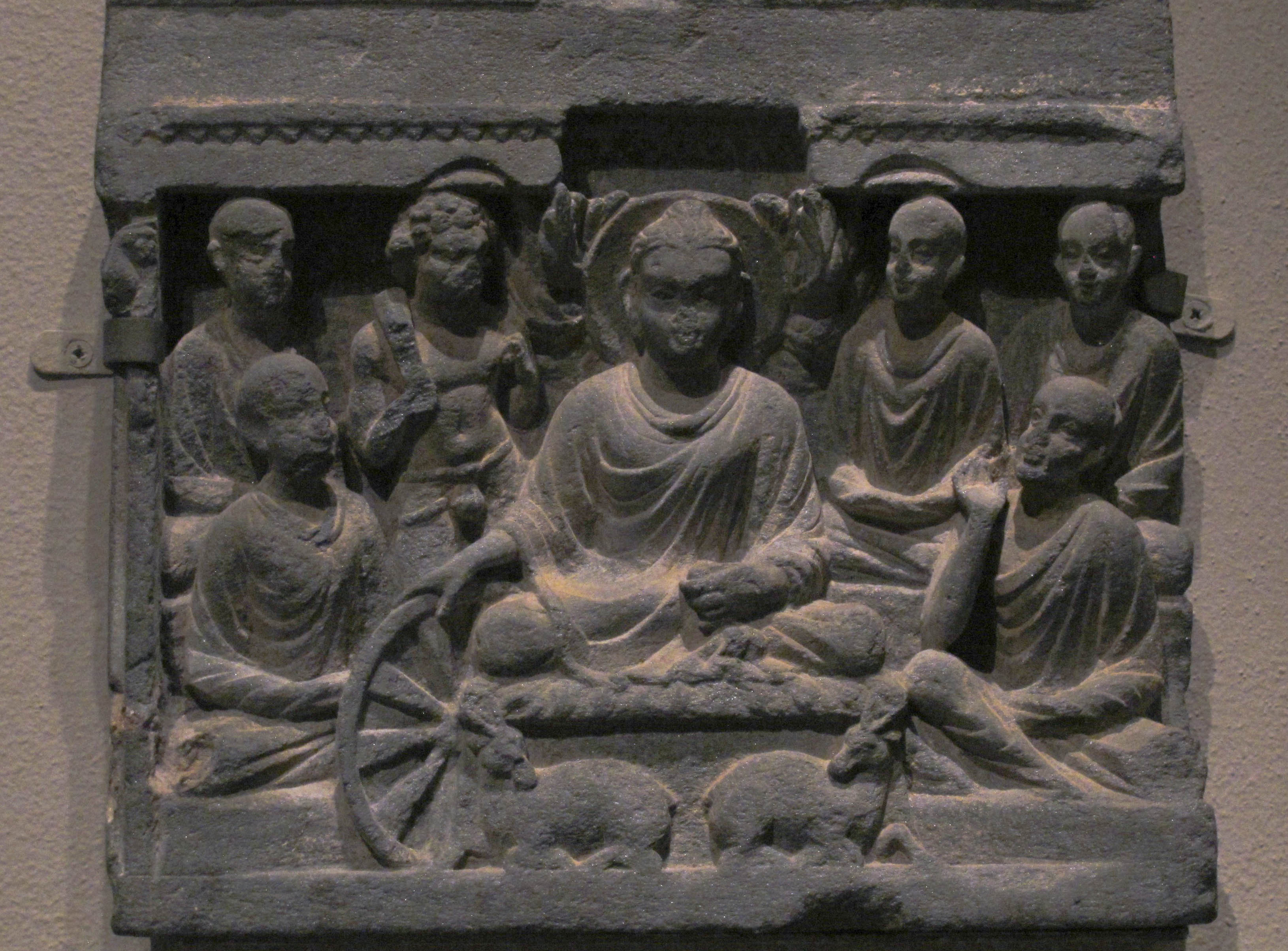
The Buddha turning the dharma wheel at deer park

The Buddha's horse, Kanthaka, and an attendant with a chakra (royal umbrella)

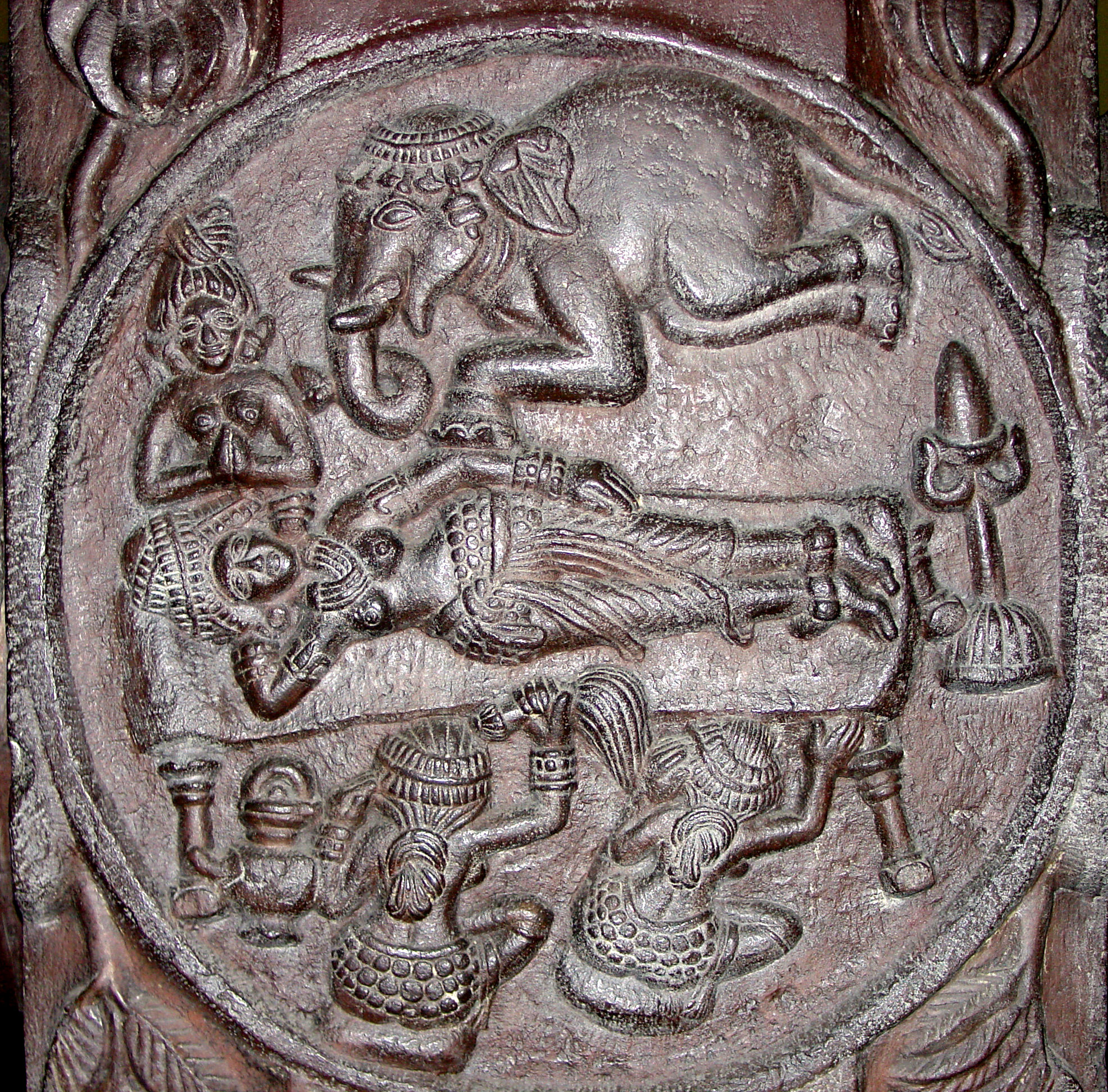
Depiction of the dream of Maya (Buddha's mother), in which the Buddha enters her side as a white elephant, from Bharhut

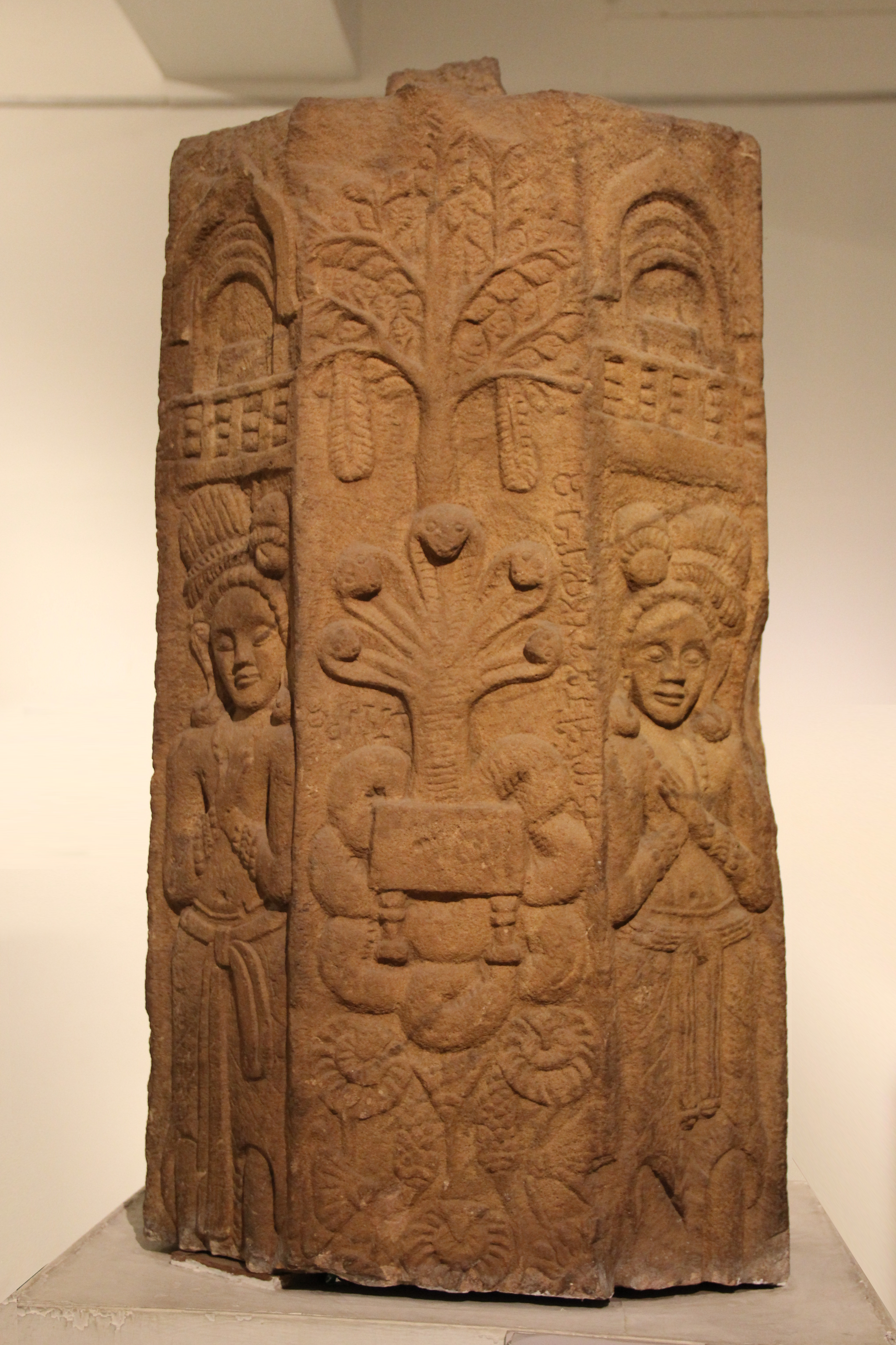
A Pillar depicting an empty throne, the Naga king Mucalinda and the Bodhi tree

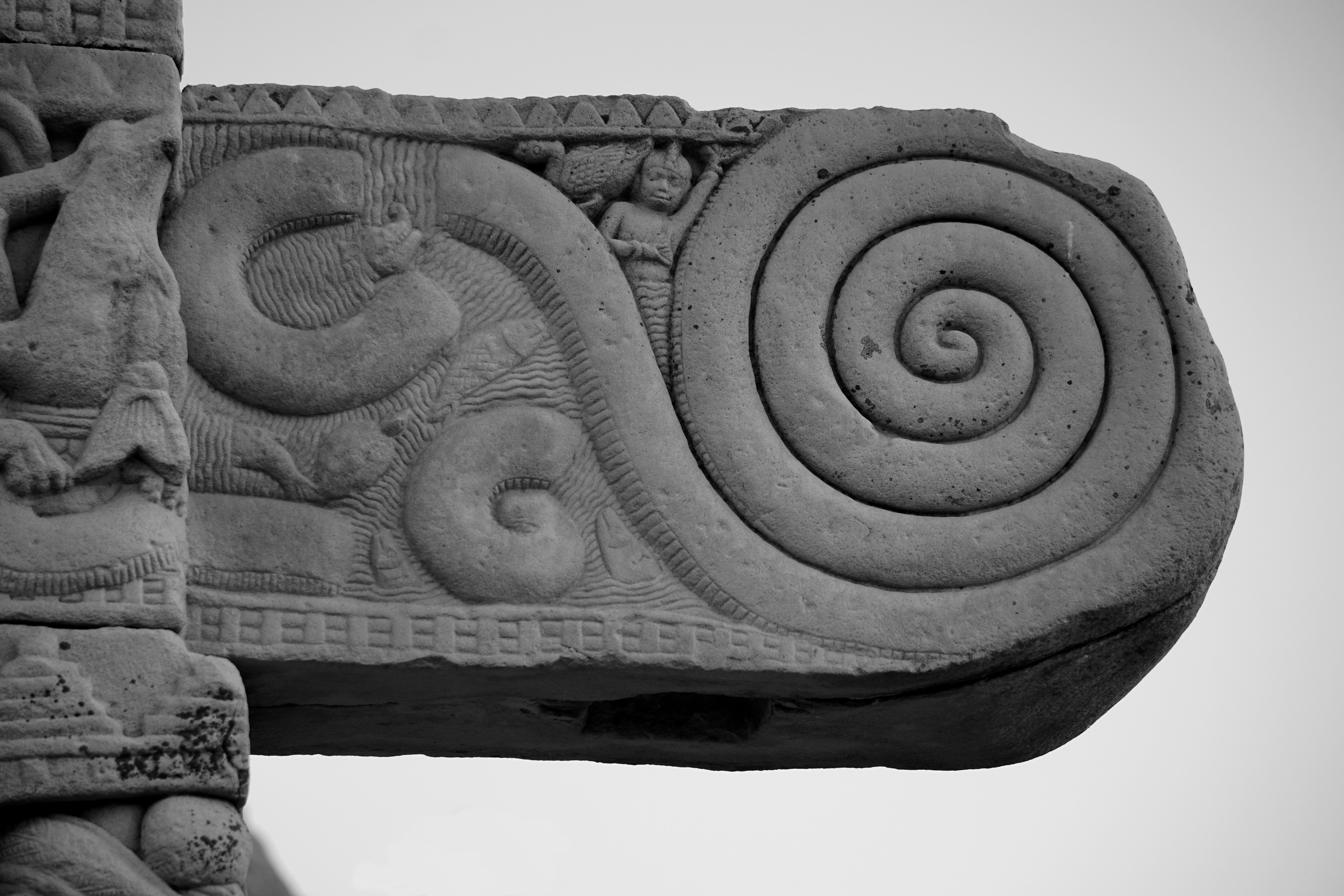
A Naga at Sanchi

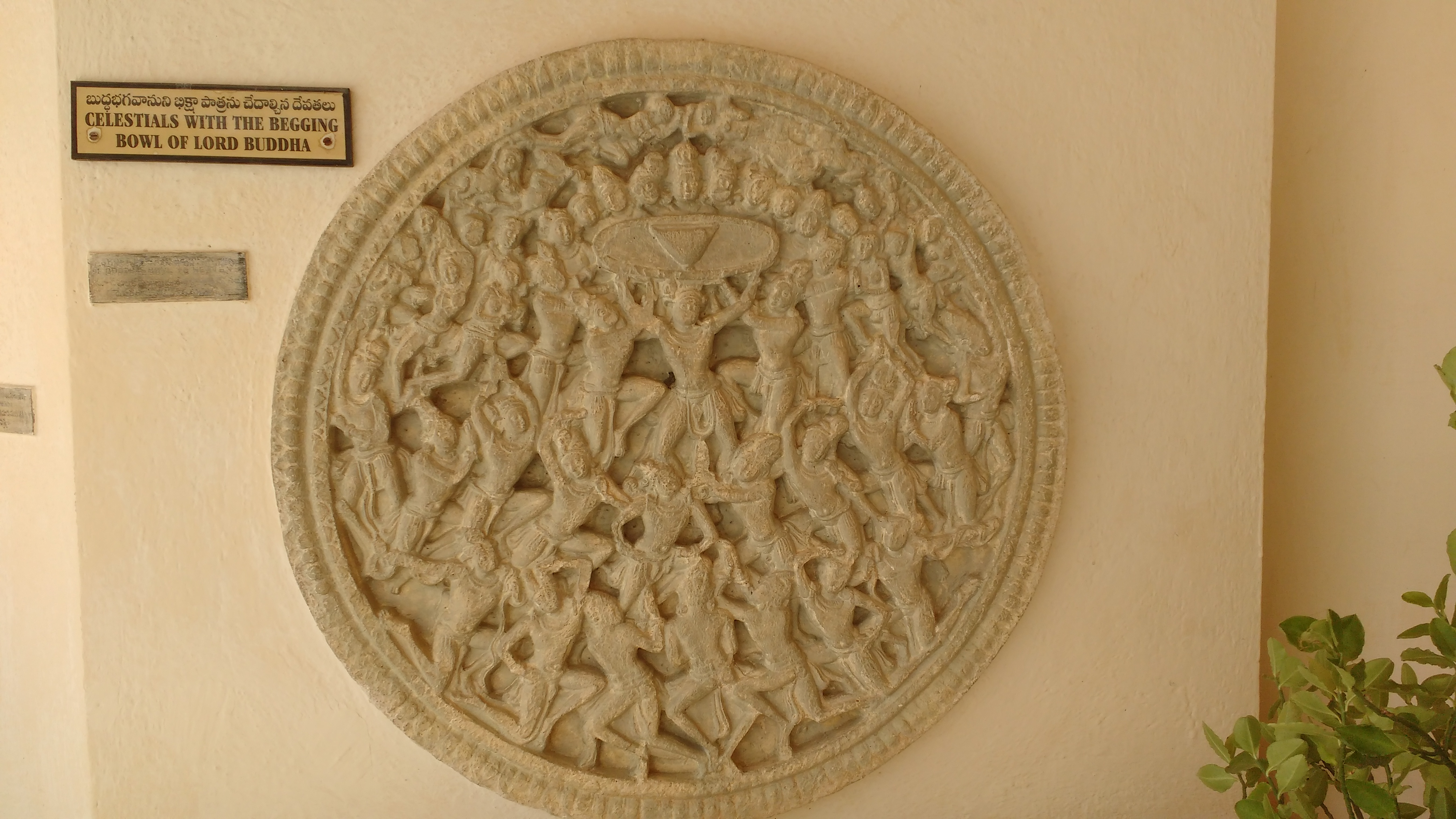
A depiction of devas holding up the begging bowl of Buddha.

== Southeast Asian Buddhist symbols ==
Theravada Buddhist art is strongly influenced by the Indian Buddhist art styles like the Amaravati and Gupta styles. Thus, Theravada Buddhism retained most of the classic Indian Buddhist symbols such as the Dharma wheel, though in many cases, these symbols became more elaborately decorated with gold, jewels and other designs.

Different artistic styles also developed throughout the Theravada world as well as unique ways of depicting the Buddha (such as the Thai style and the Khmer style) containing their own ways of using Buddhist symbols.

=== Gallery ===
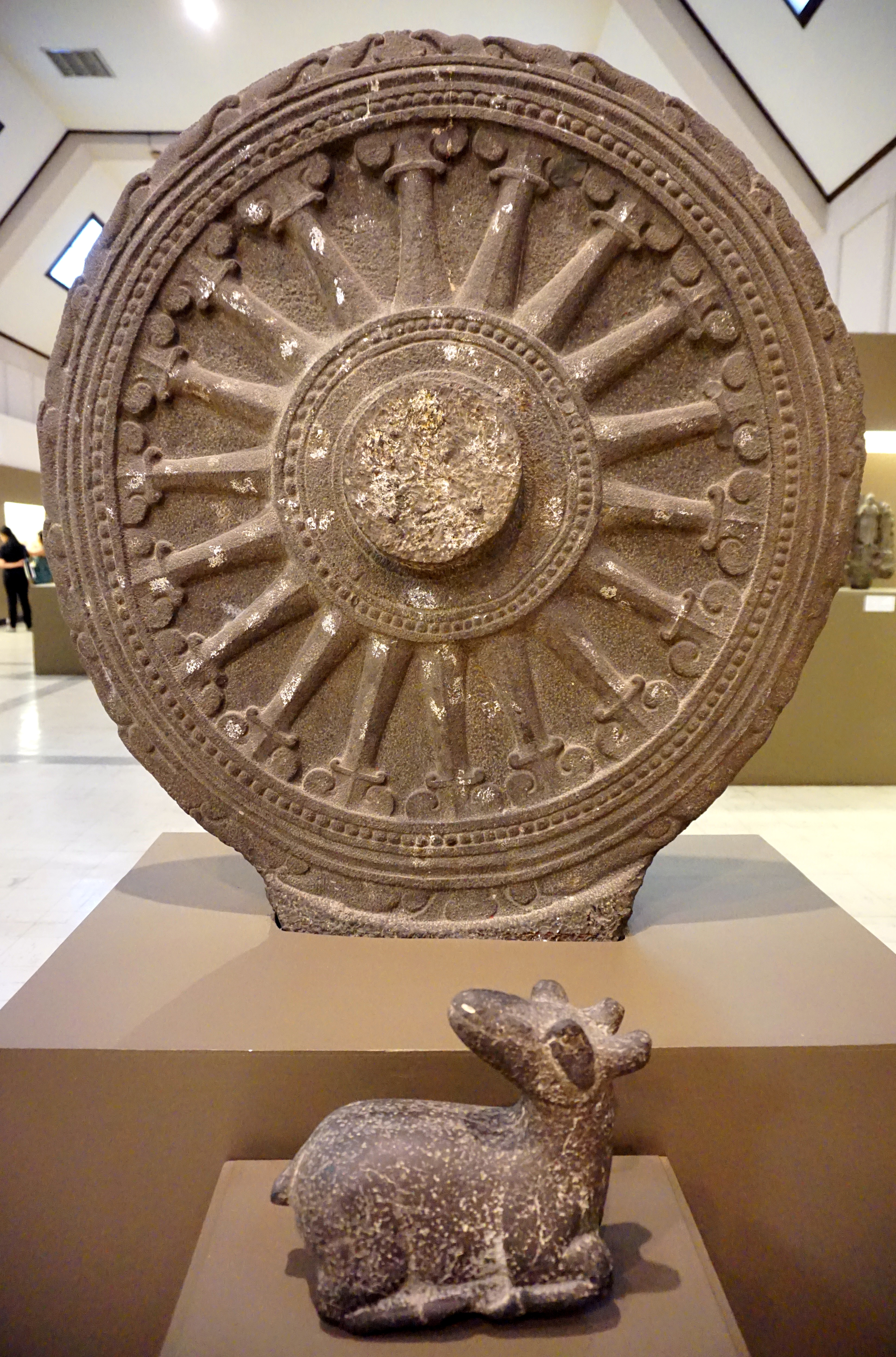
Dhamma wheel from Dvaravati

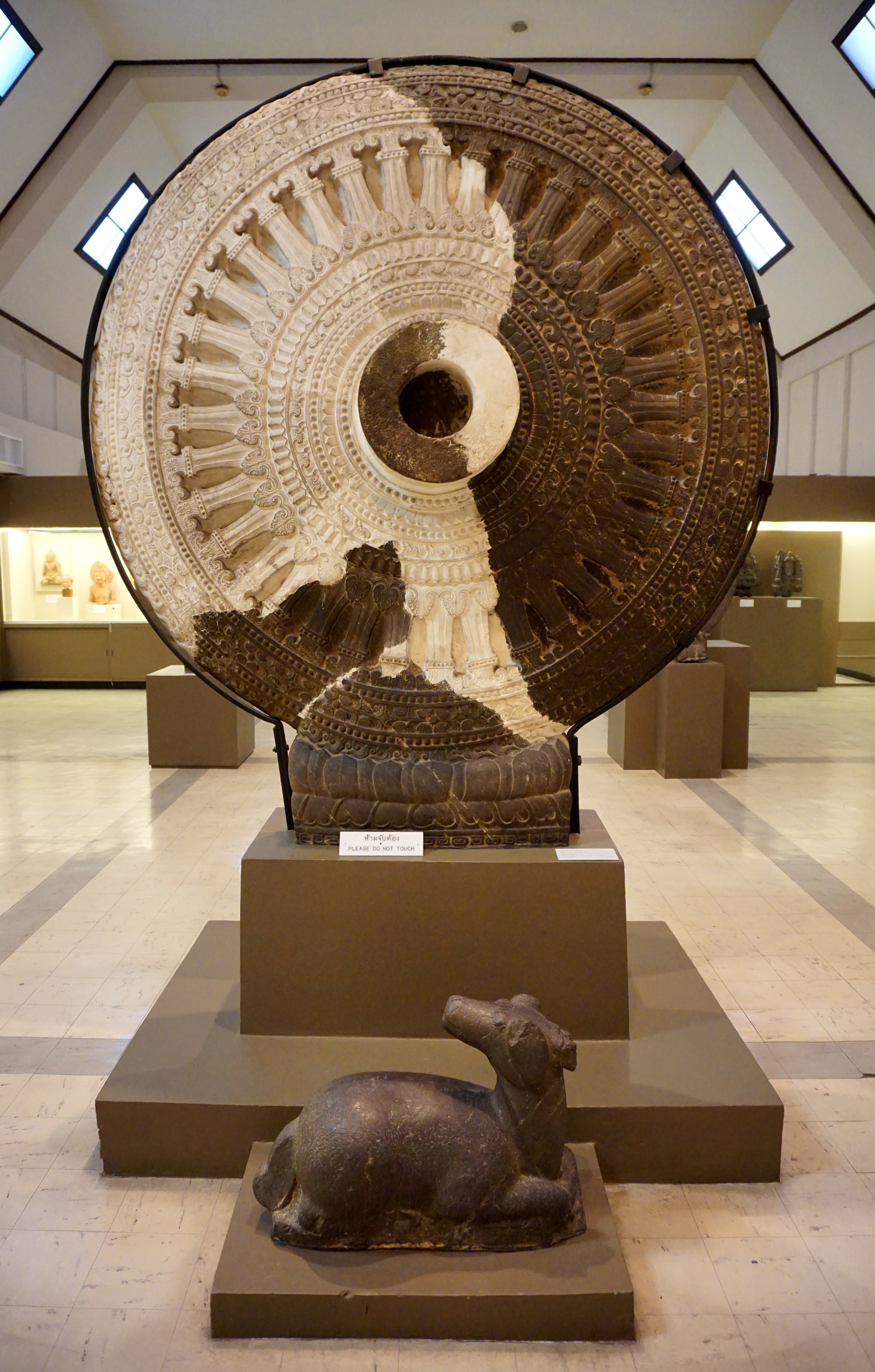
Dhamma wheel and deer from Dvaravati

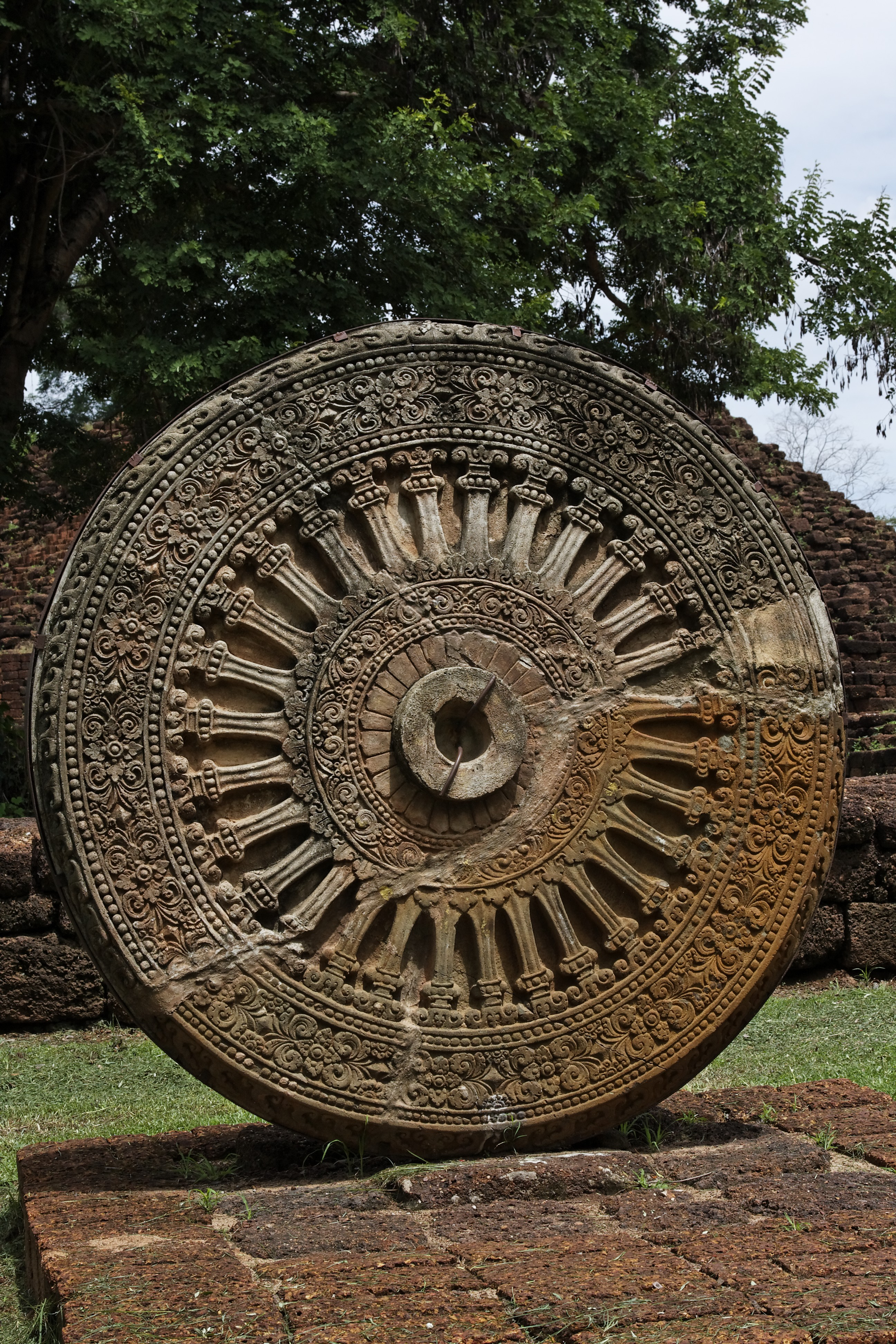
Dhamma wheel, Dvaravati period, Khao Klang Nai, Si Thep Historical Park, Thailand

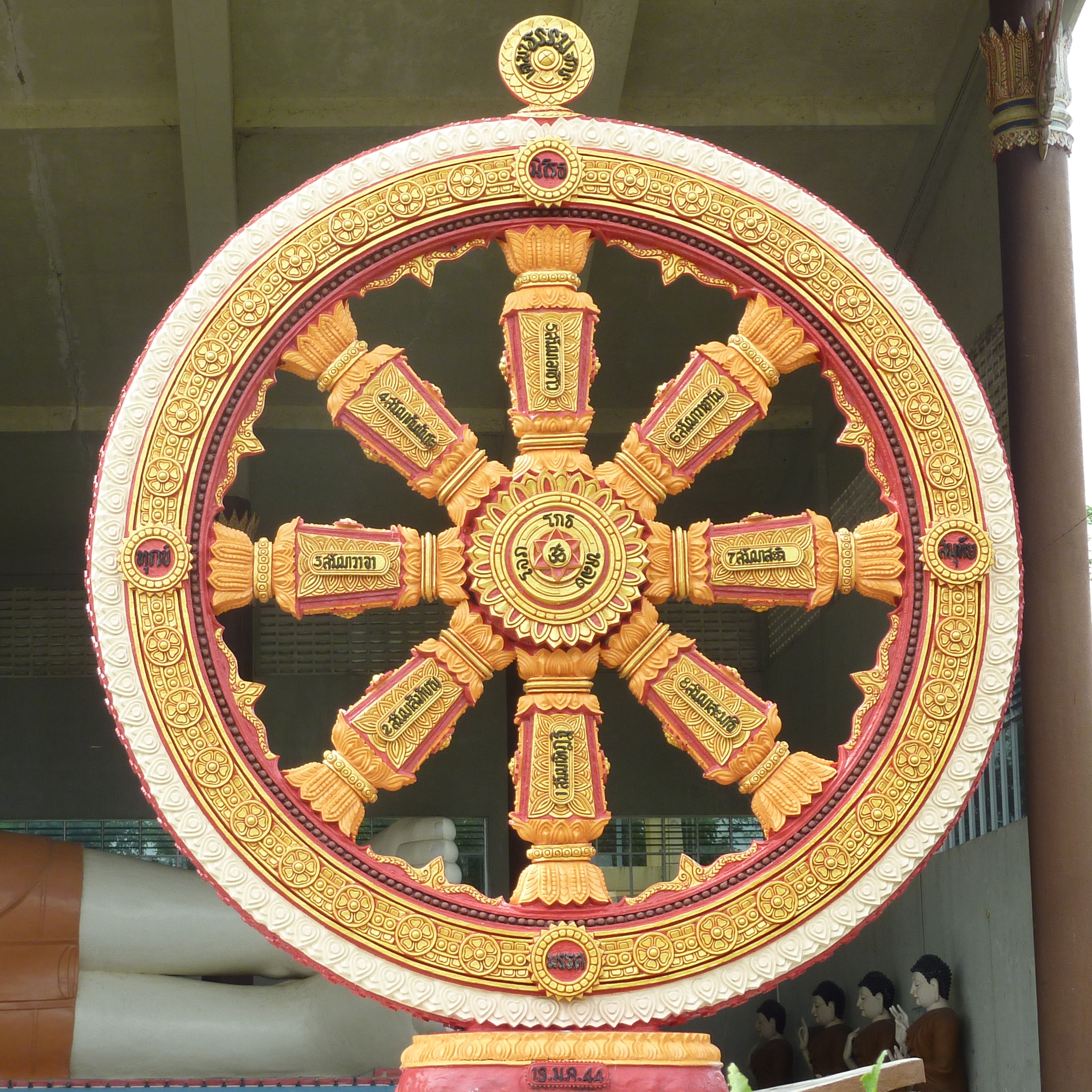
A Thai Dhamma wheel at Wat Phothivihan, Tumpat, Kelantan

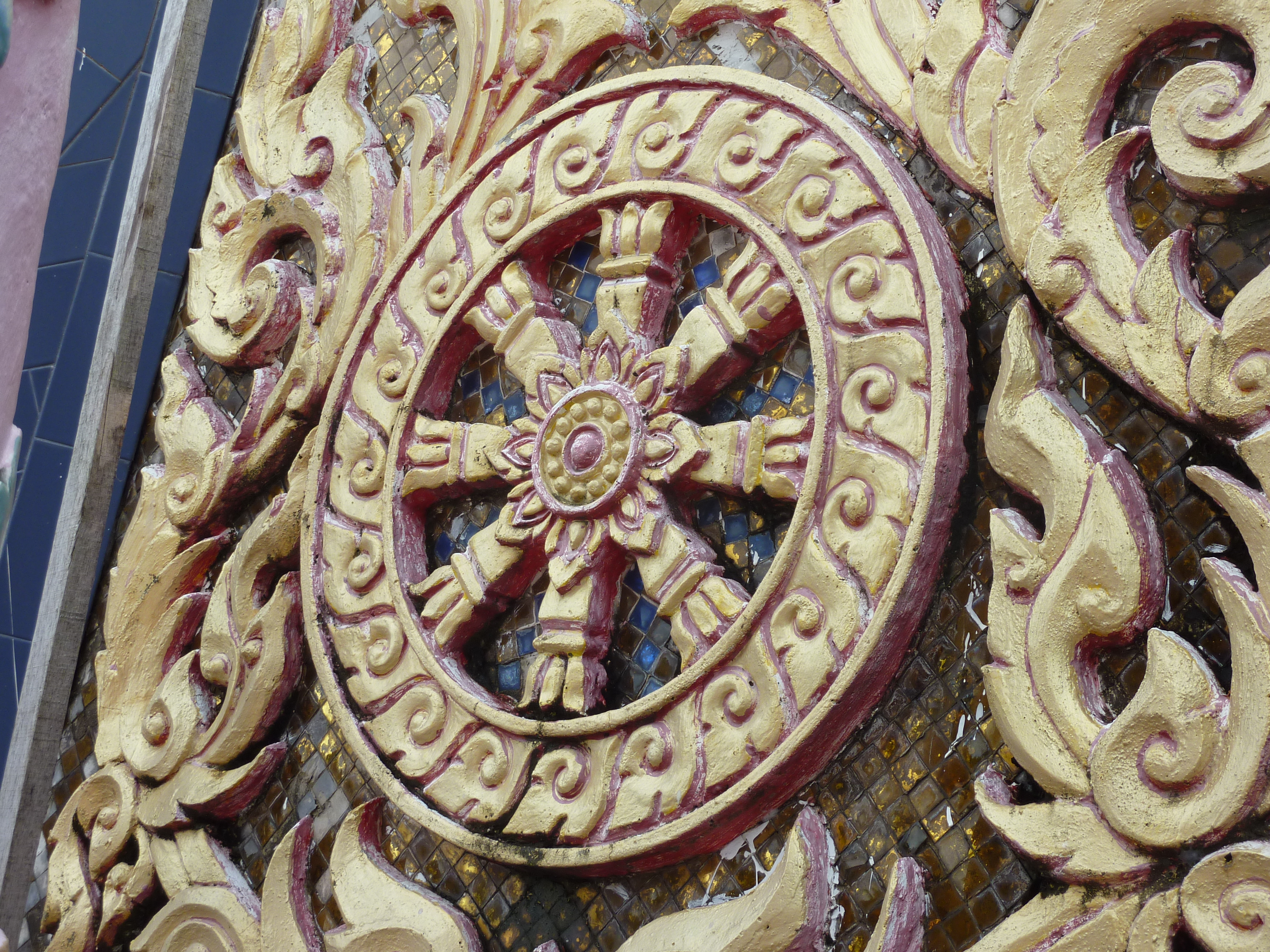
Dhamma wheel at Wat Maisuwankiri, Tumpat, Malaysia

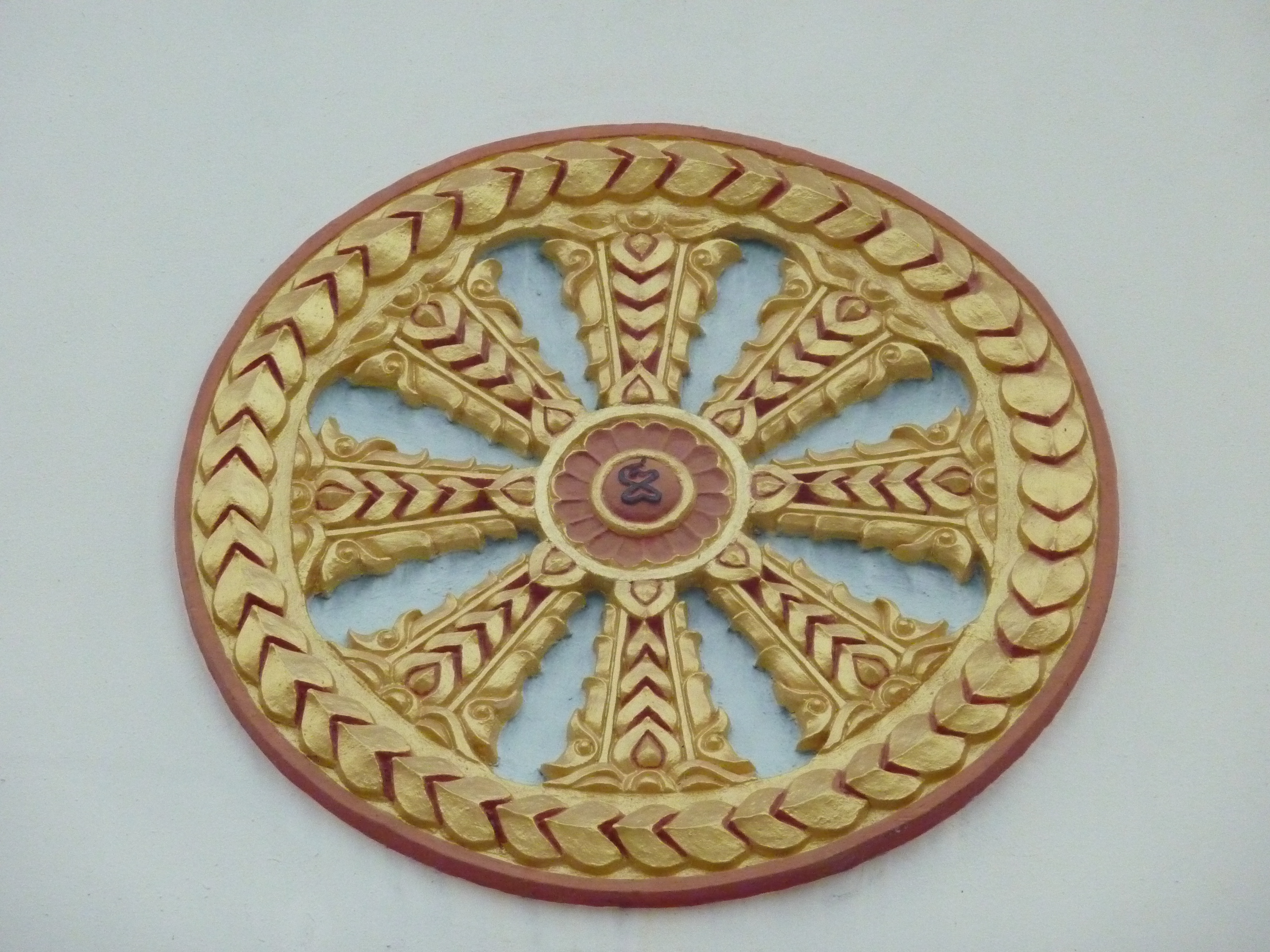
Dhamma wheel at

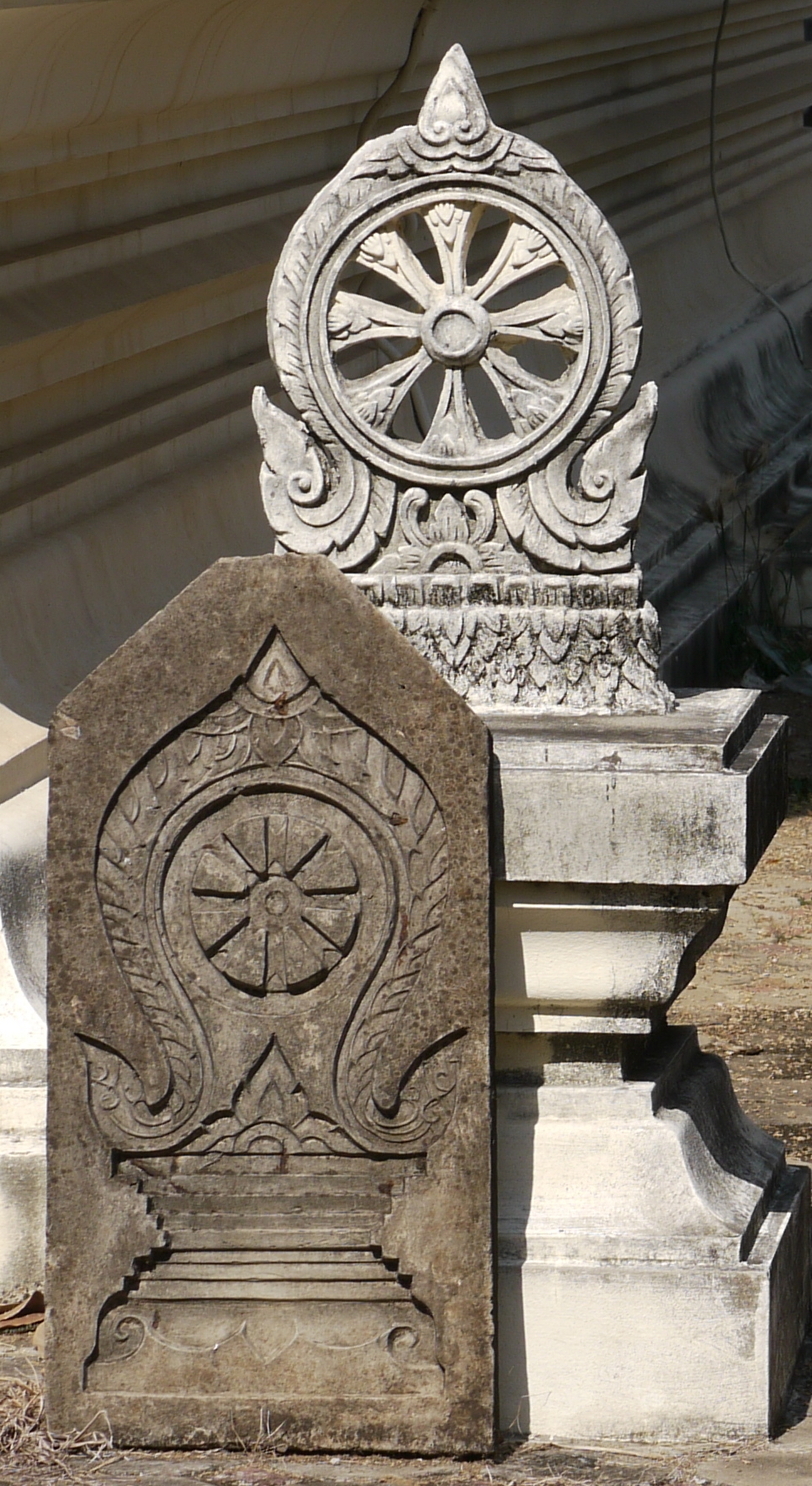
A mold and a Bai Sema stone (monastery boundary stone)

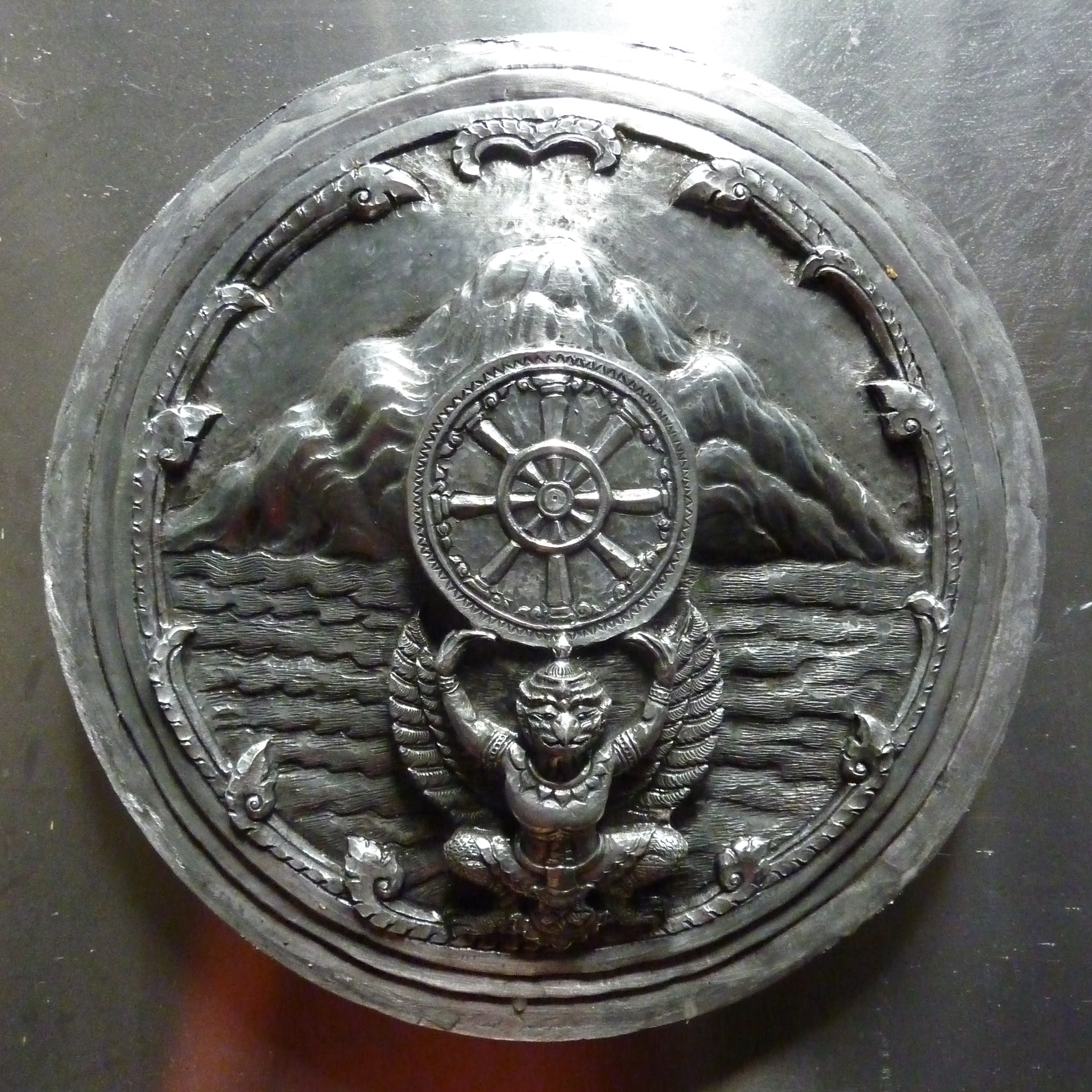
Seal of the Chainat province.

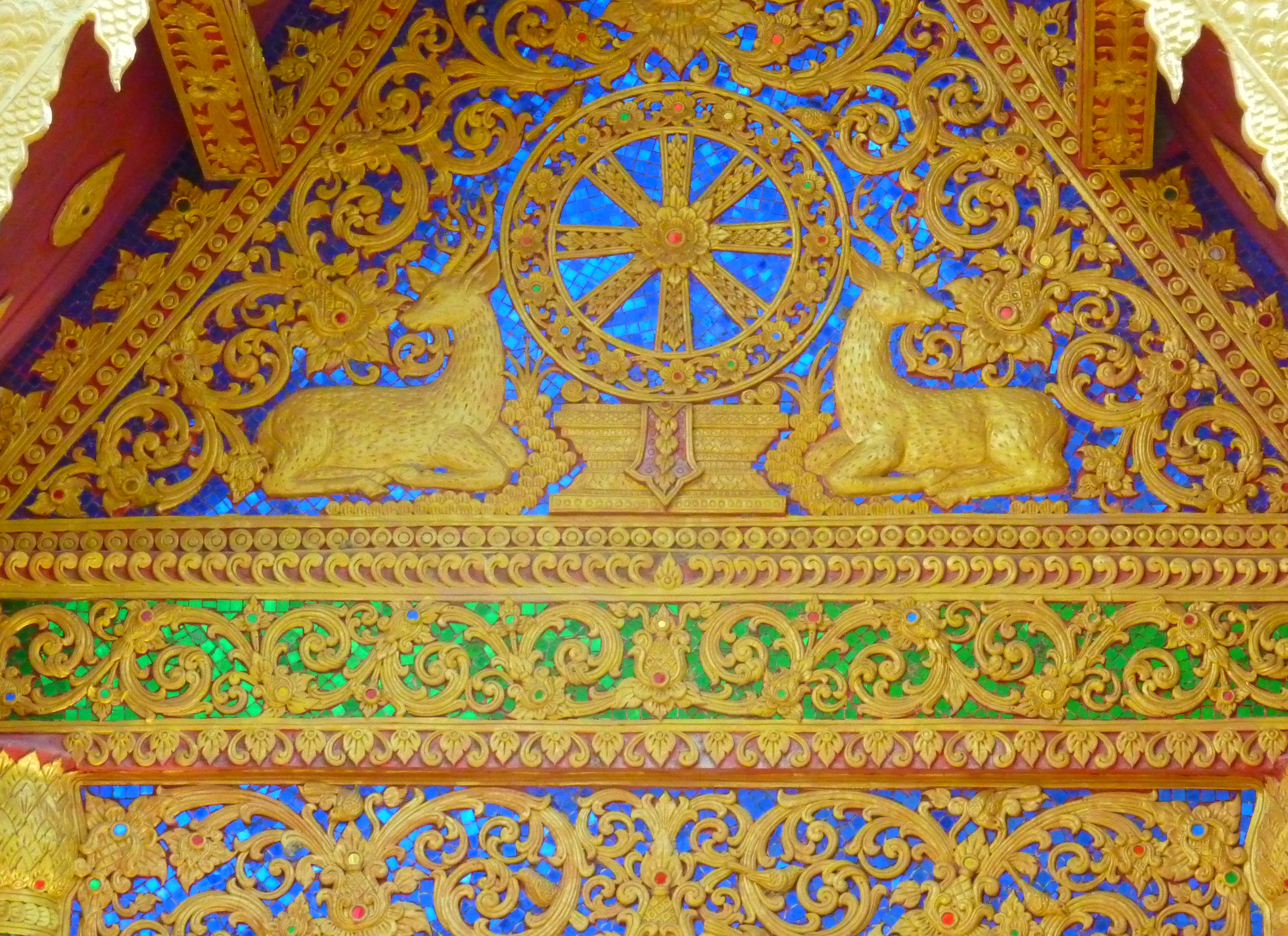
Dhammacakka on Main Gable, Wat Phra Putthabat Tak Pha, Lamphun

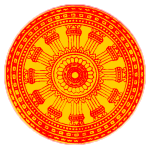
A Thai style Dhamma wheel

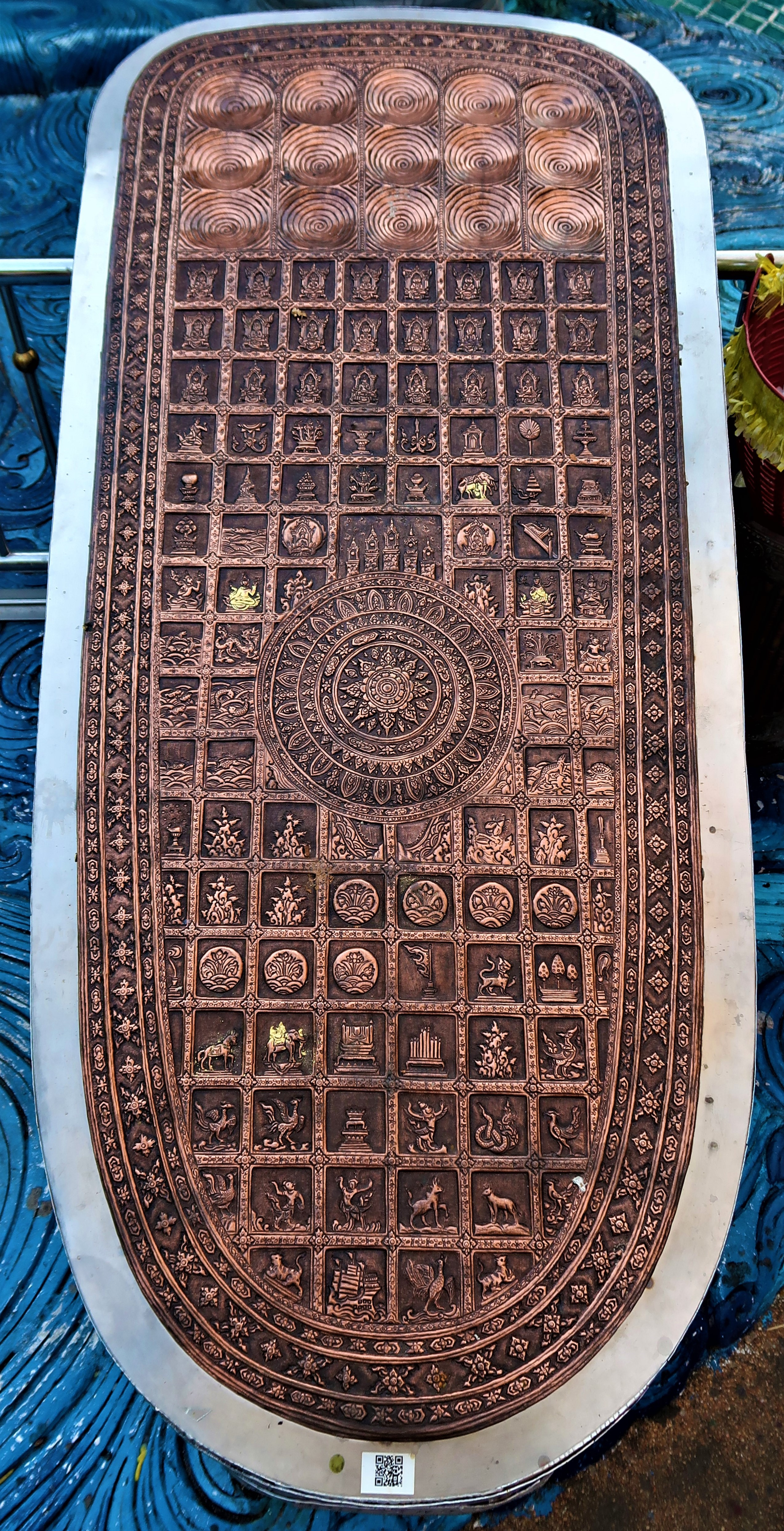
Buddha footprint outside the Silver temple in Chiang Mai.

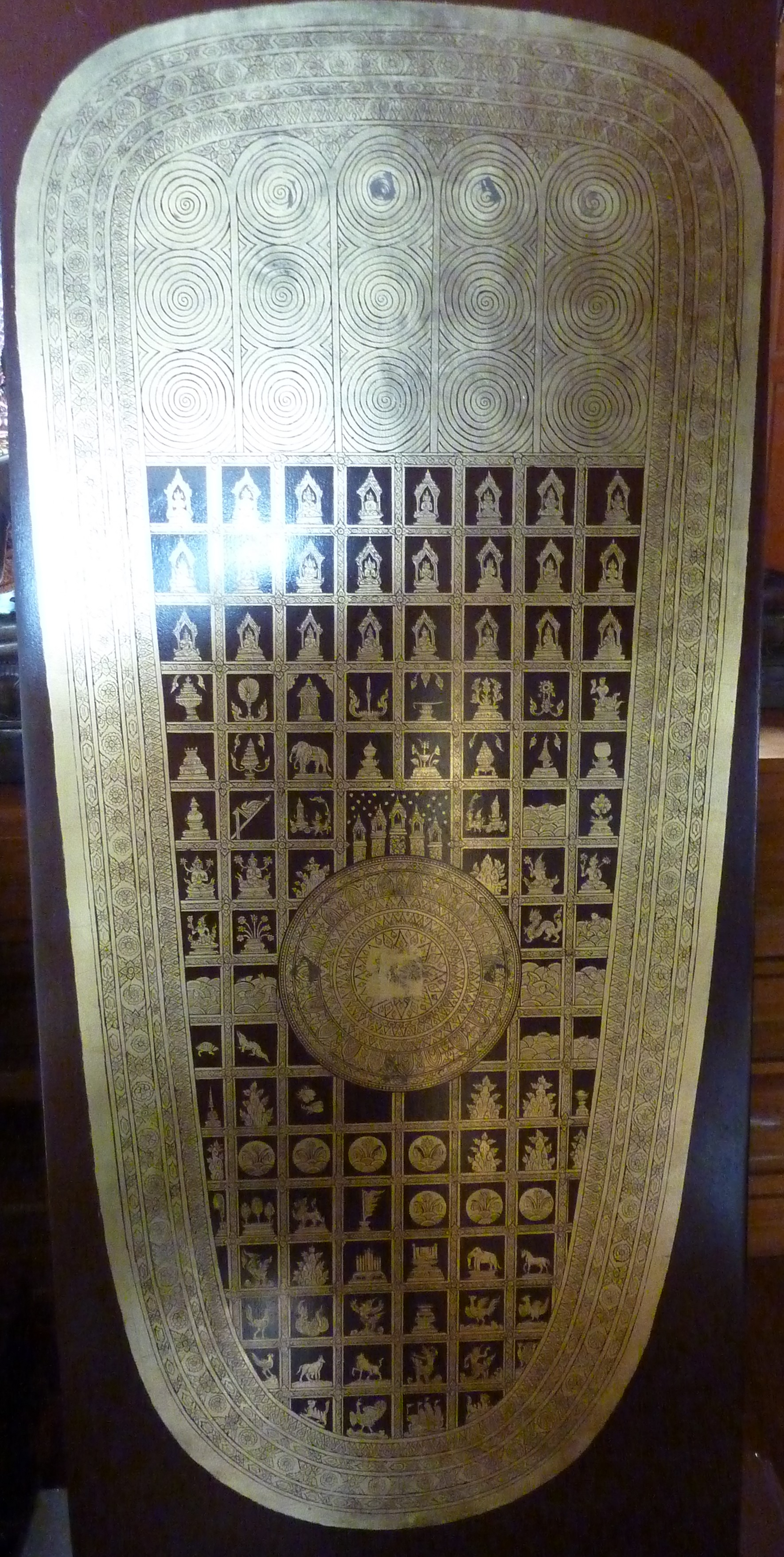
Buddha Left Footprint, Wat Phra That Doi Suthep, Chiang Mai

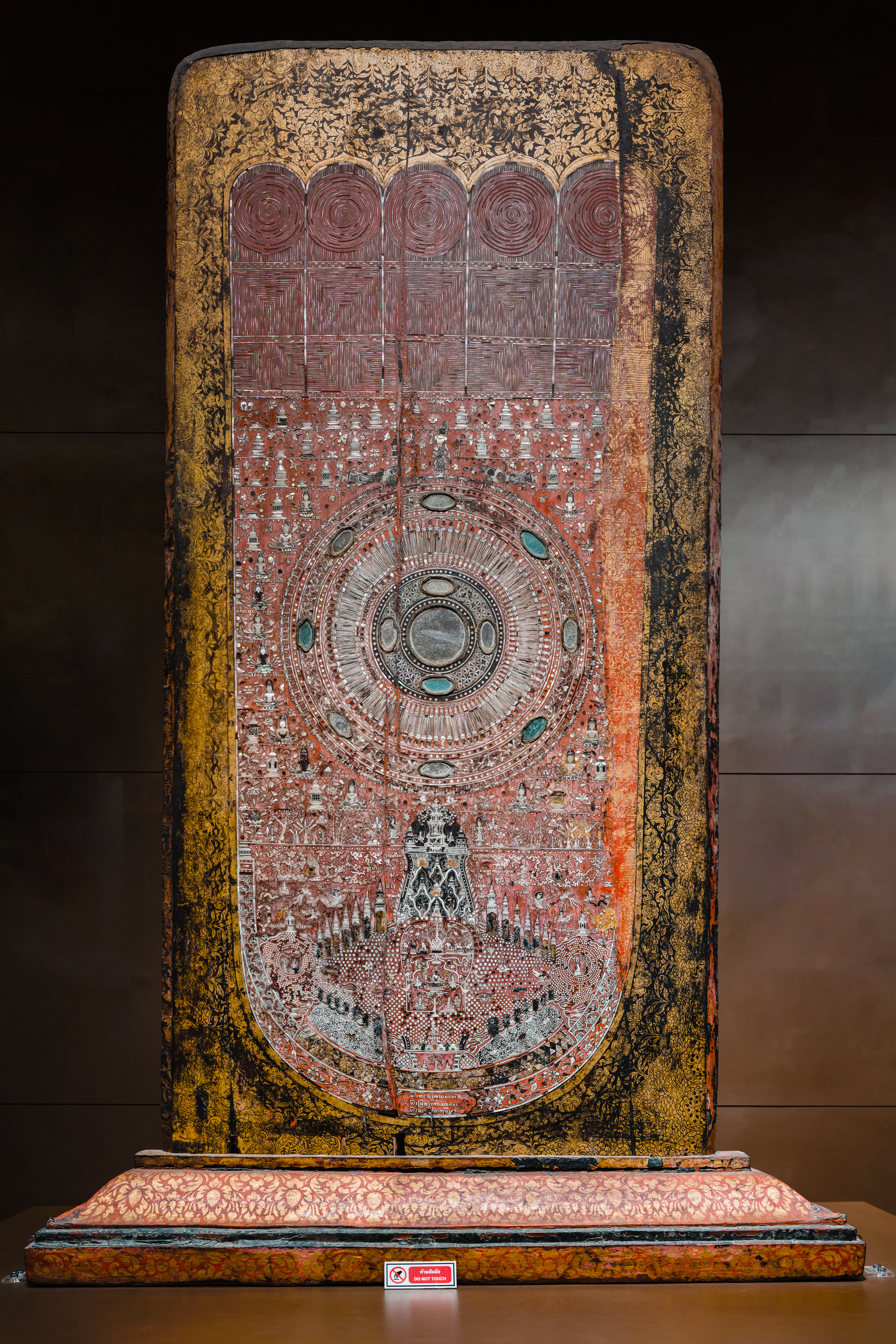
Buddhapada, Teak wood decorated with mother of pearl and glass. Lanna art, late 15th - early 16th centuries. Wat Phra Singh Woramahaviharn.

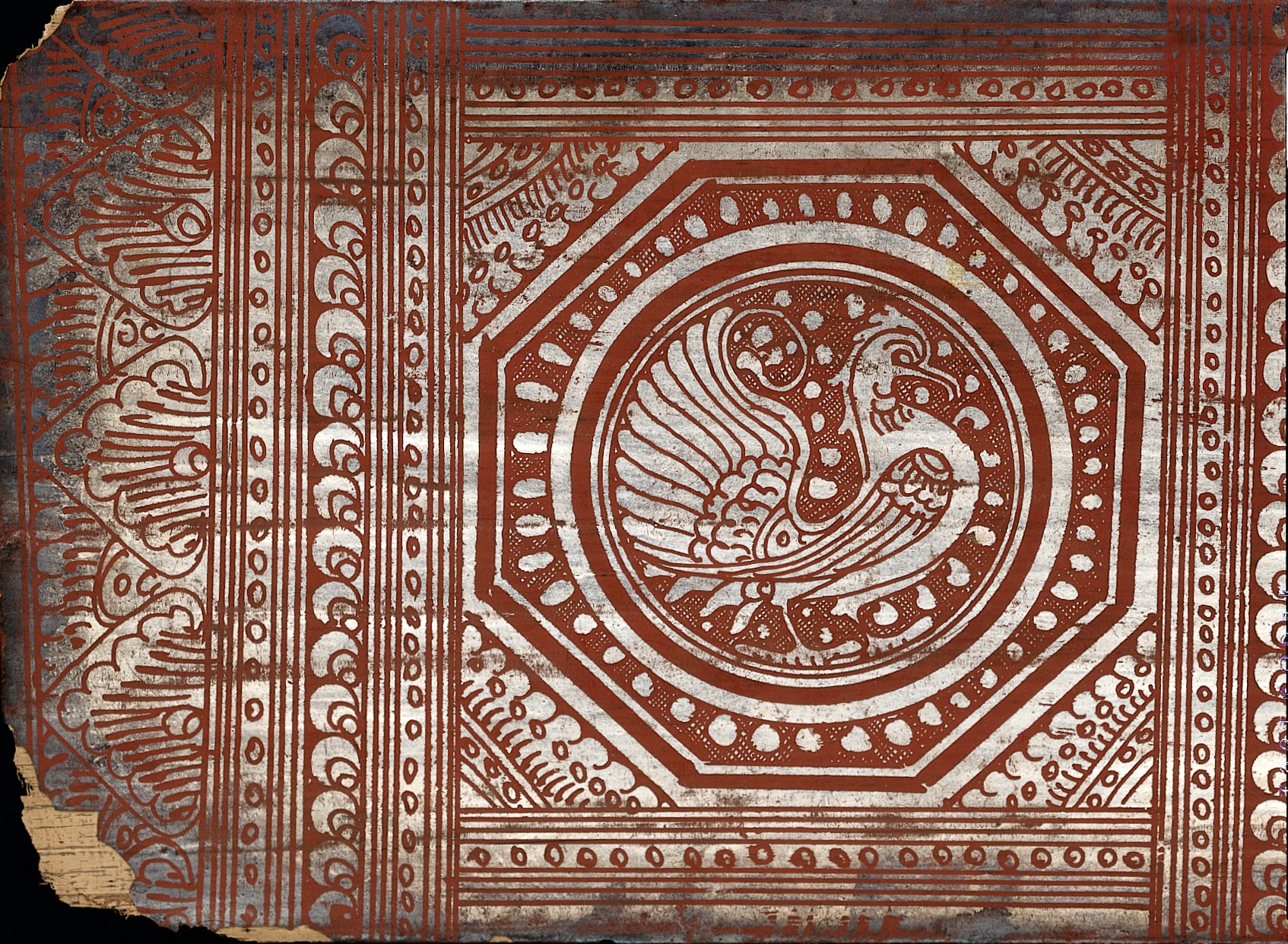
Burmese Pali manuscript depicting a hamsa bird.

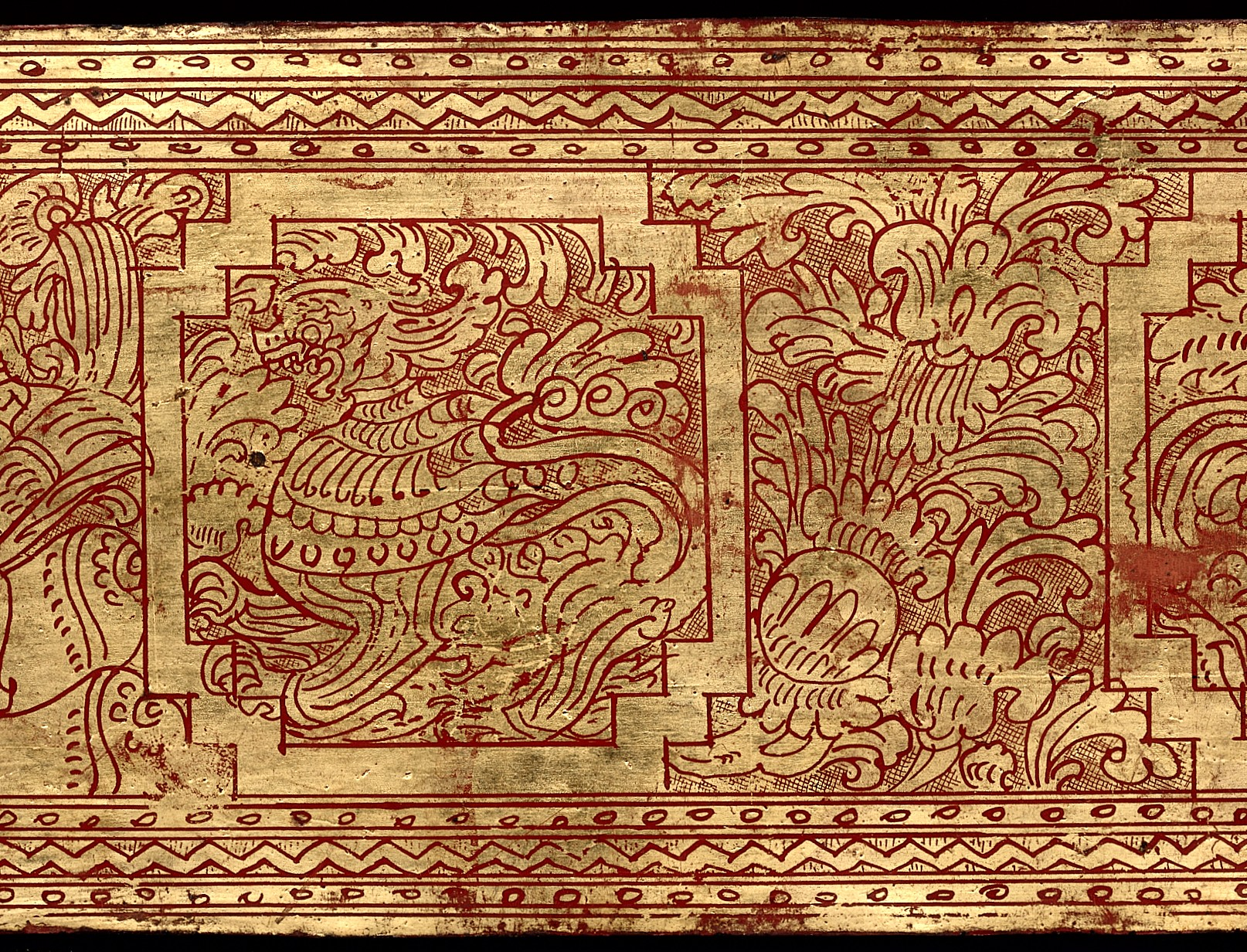
Lion in a Burmese Pali Manuscript

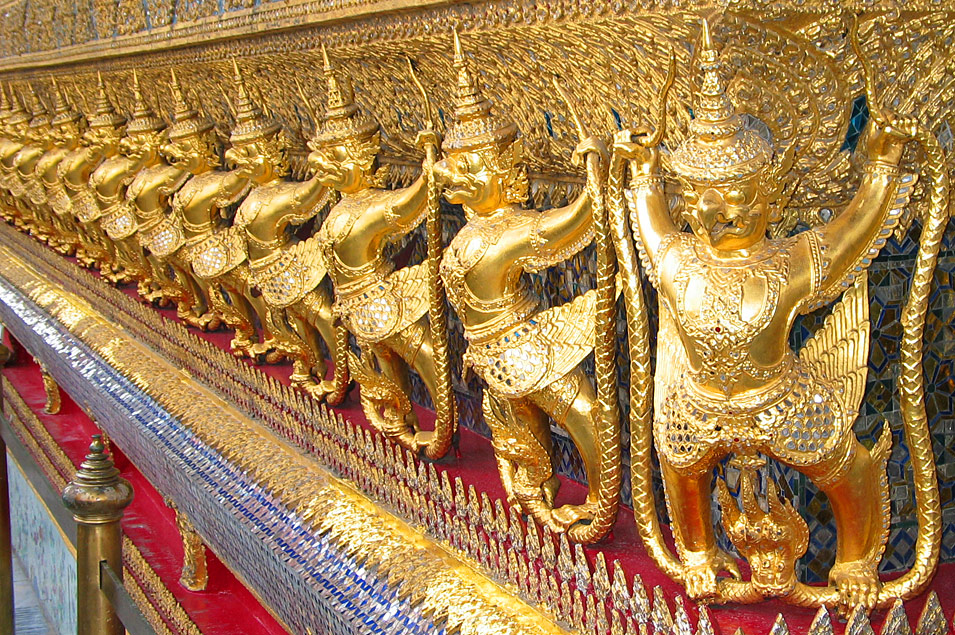
Garuda and Nagas, Wat Phra Kaeo, Bangkok, Thailand.

== East Asian Buddhist symbols ==
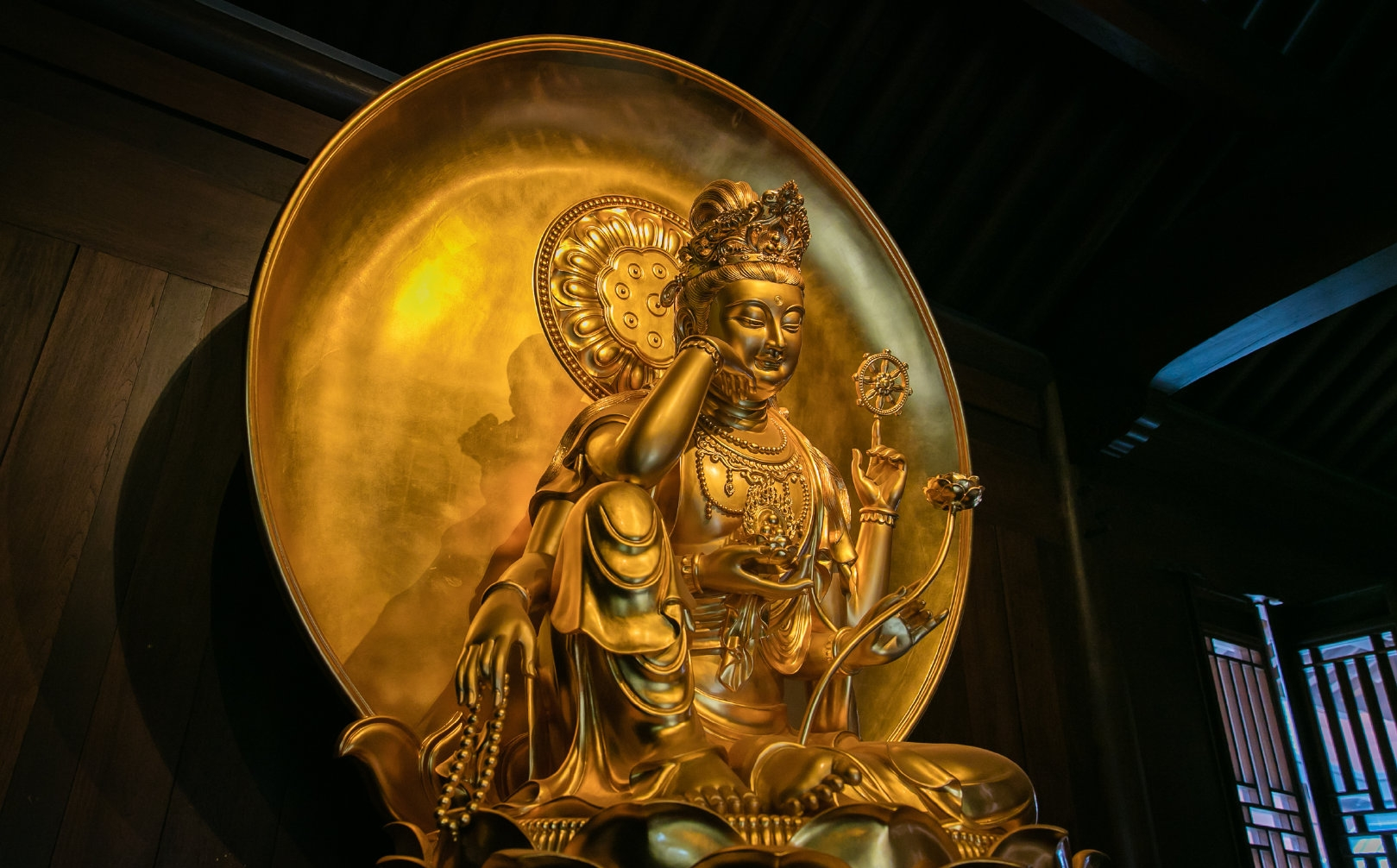
Statue of Guanyin with various attributes (cintamani, chakra, lotus, prayer beads)

East Asian Buddhism adopted many of the classic Buddhist symbolism outlined above. During the Tang dynasty (618–907 CE) Buddhist symbolism became widespread, and symbols like the swastika and the Dharma wheel (Chinese: 法輪; pinyin: fălún, "wheel of life") became well known in China. There were also more elaborate symbols, like Buddhist mandalas and complex images of Buddhas and bodhisattva figures.

There are also some symbols that are generally unique to East Asian Buddhism, including the purple robe(which indicated a particularly eminent monastic), the ruyi scepter, the "wooden fish", the ring staff (khakkhara), The Eighteen Arhats (or Luohan) (Chinese: 十八羅漢)the "ever burning lamp" (changmingdeng) and various kinds of Buddhist amulets or charms, such as Japanese omamori and ofuda, and Chinese fu (符) or fulu.

Chinese Buddhism also adopted traditional pre-Buddhist Chinese symbols and deities, including money trees, Chinese dragons, and Chinese gods like the Jade Emperor and various generals like Guan Yu. Japanese Buddhism also developed some unique symbols of its own. For example, in Japanese Zen, a widely used symbol is the ensō, a hand-drawn black circle.

=== Gallery ===
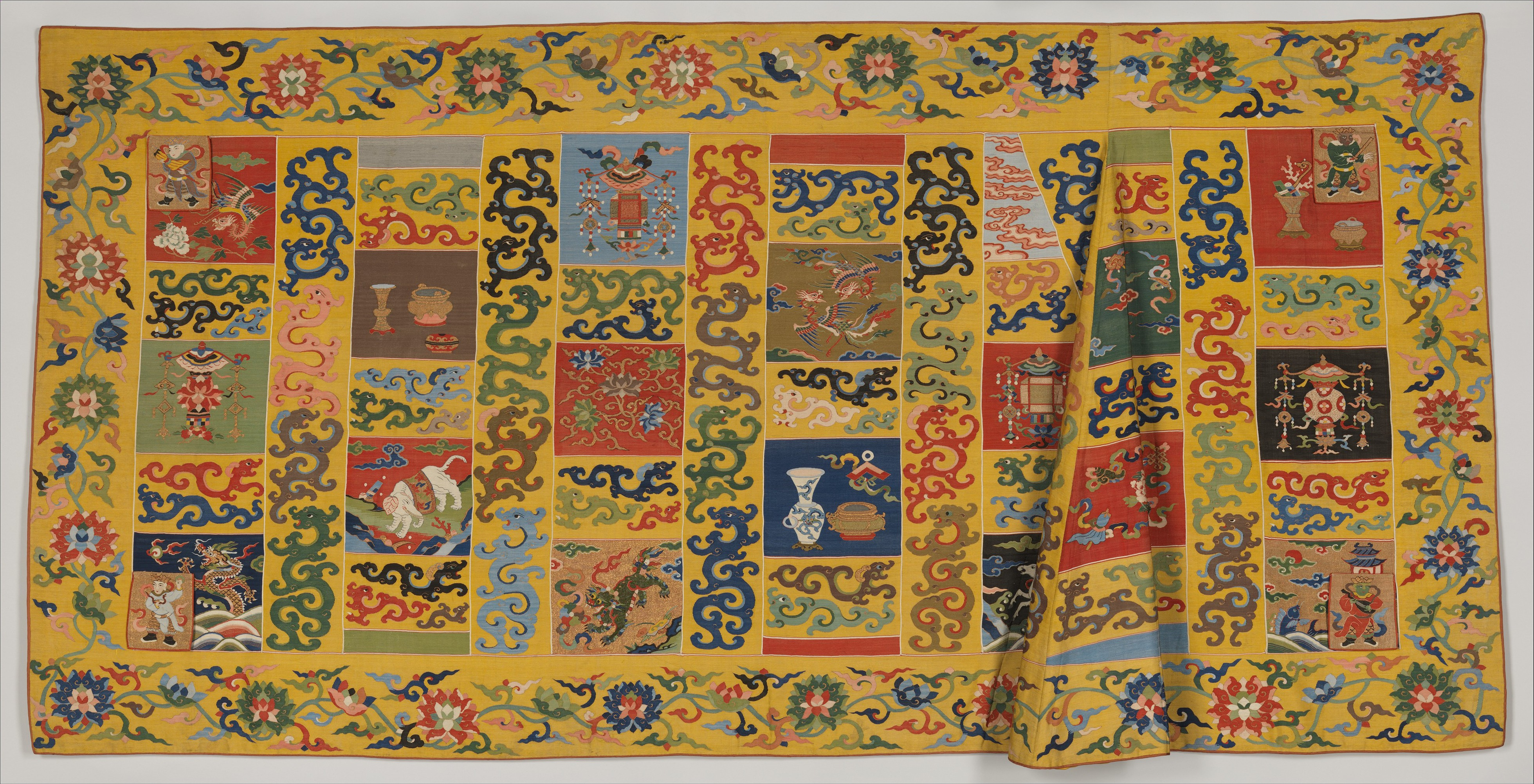
Chinese Buddhist priest's silk robe with various Buddhist symbols

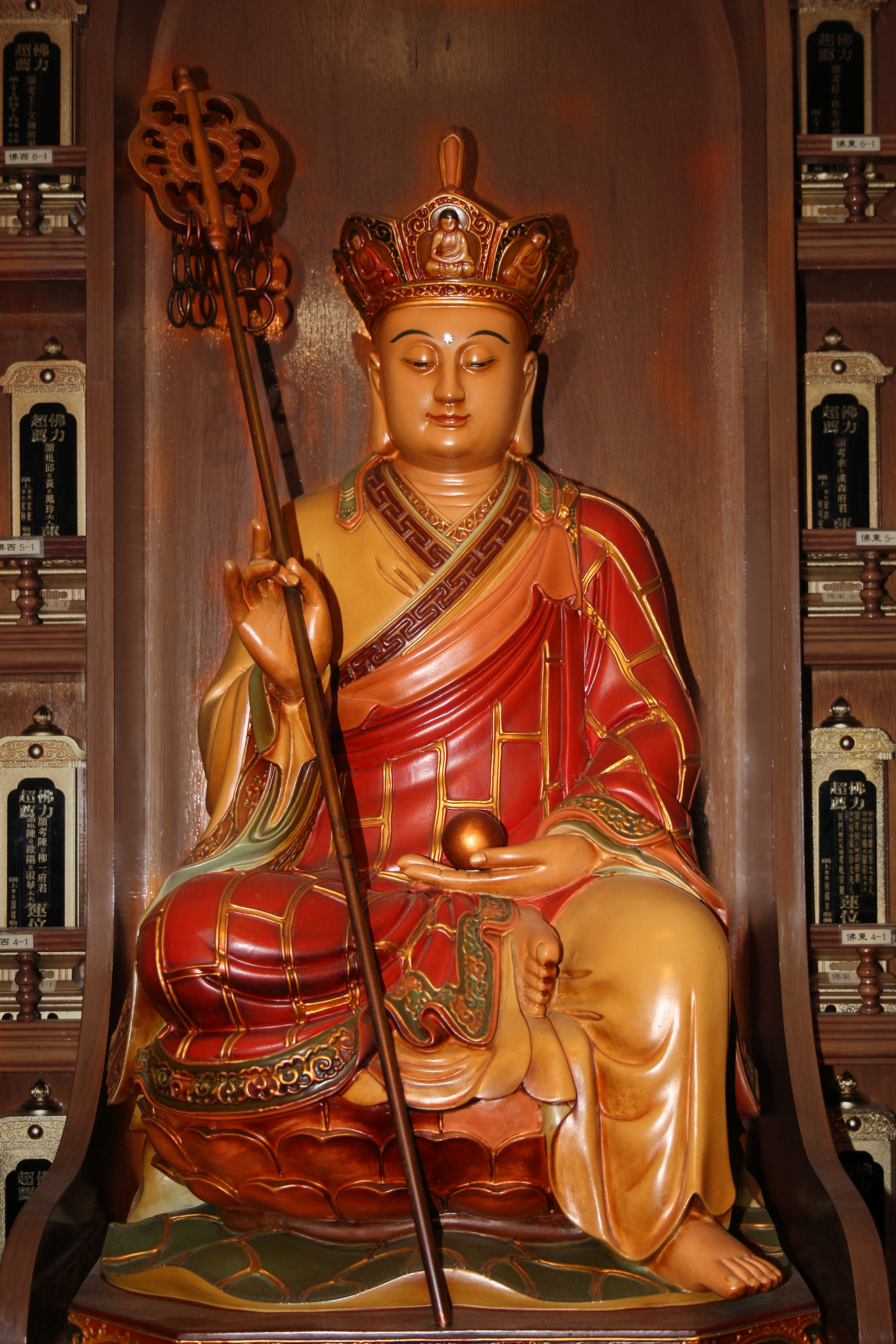
A statue of bodhisattva Kṣitigarbha holding a cintamani stone and a ring staff

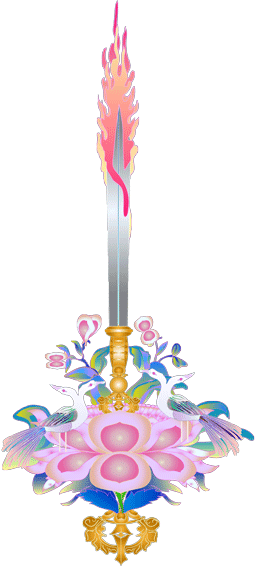
The Flaming Sword of Wisdom

Bhutanese throne cover with a gankyil

Old flag of Sikkim with Dharma wheel and gankyil

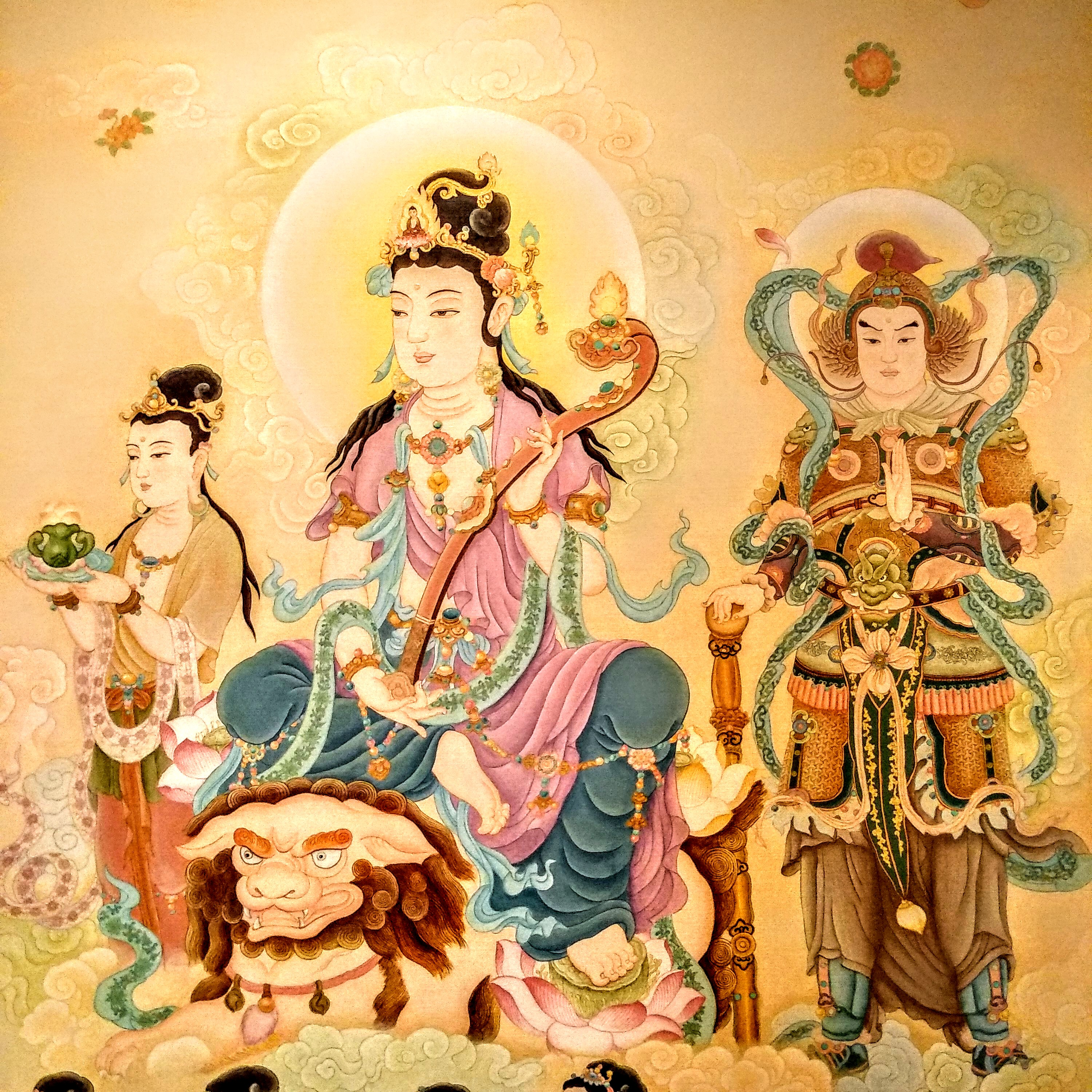
Chinese depiction of Manjushri, riding a lion and holding a ruyi scepter

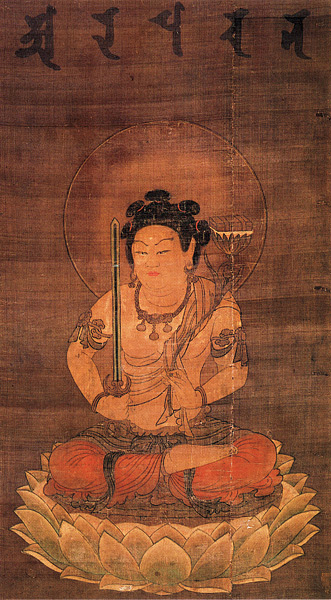
A Japanese painting of Manjushri (monju) holding a sword and a lotus topped with a sutra, Kamakura period

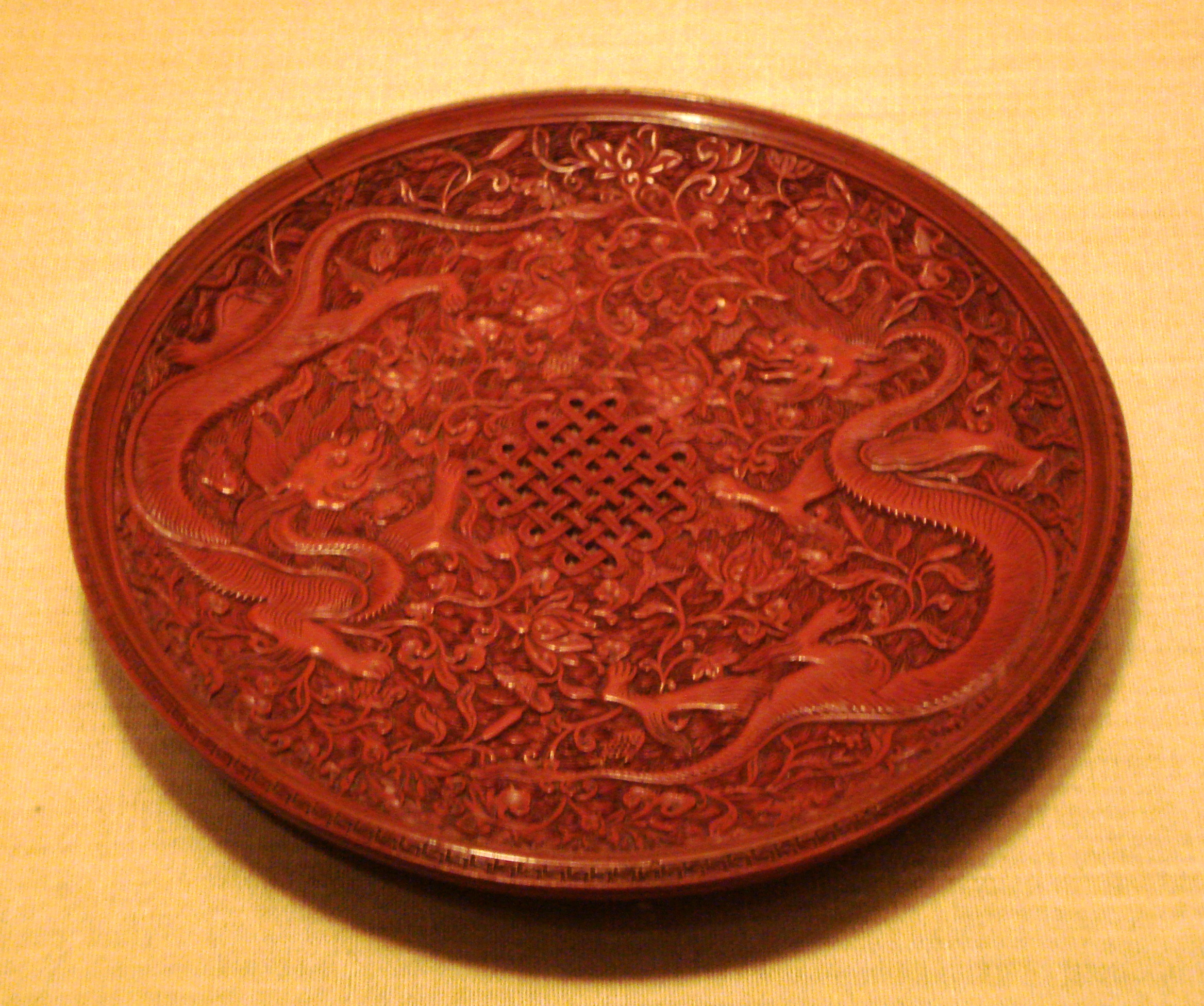
Ming dynasty red lacquerware dish with Chinese dragons and an endless knot

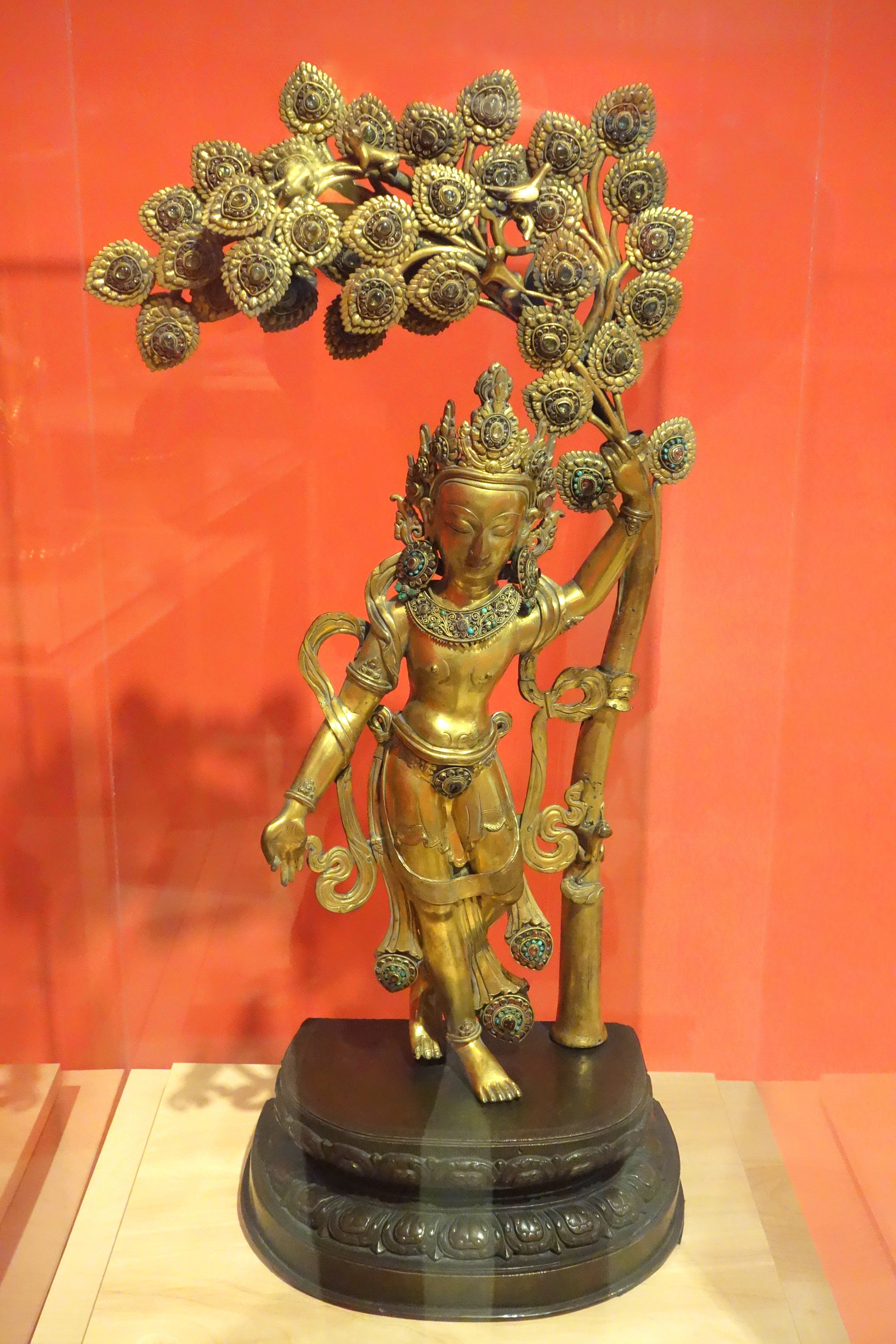
Cinatamani Lokesvara with a kalpavriksha

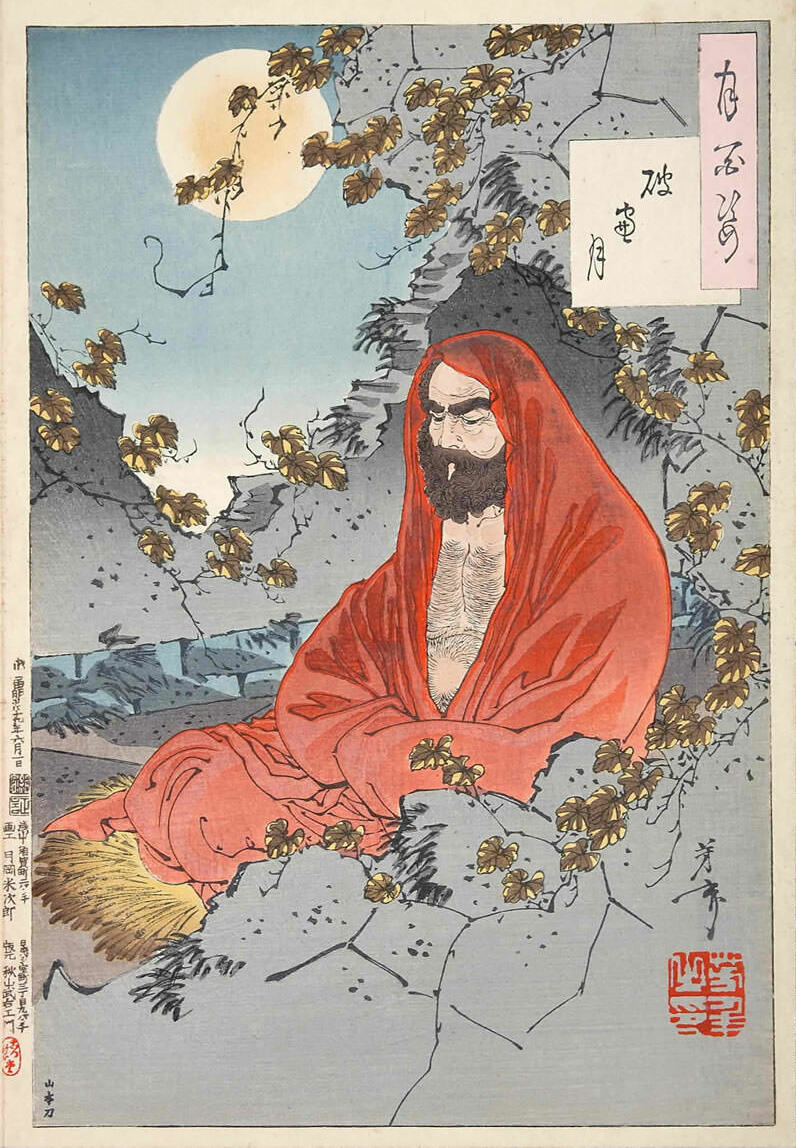
Bodhidharma is widely depicted in Zen, the moon symbolizes enlightenment

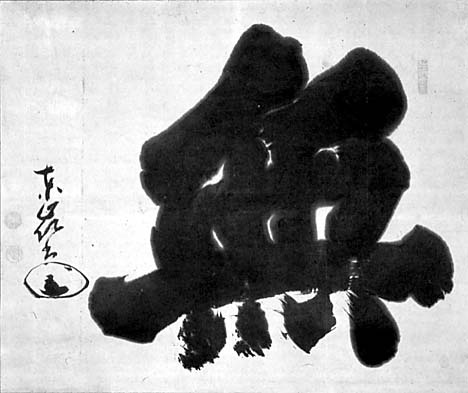
Calligraphy of the kanji for Mu (無, "no", "not") widely used in Zen calligraphy

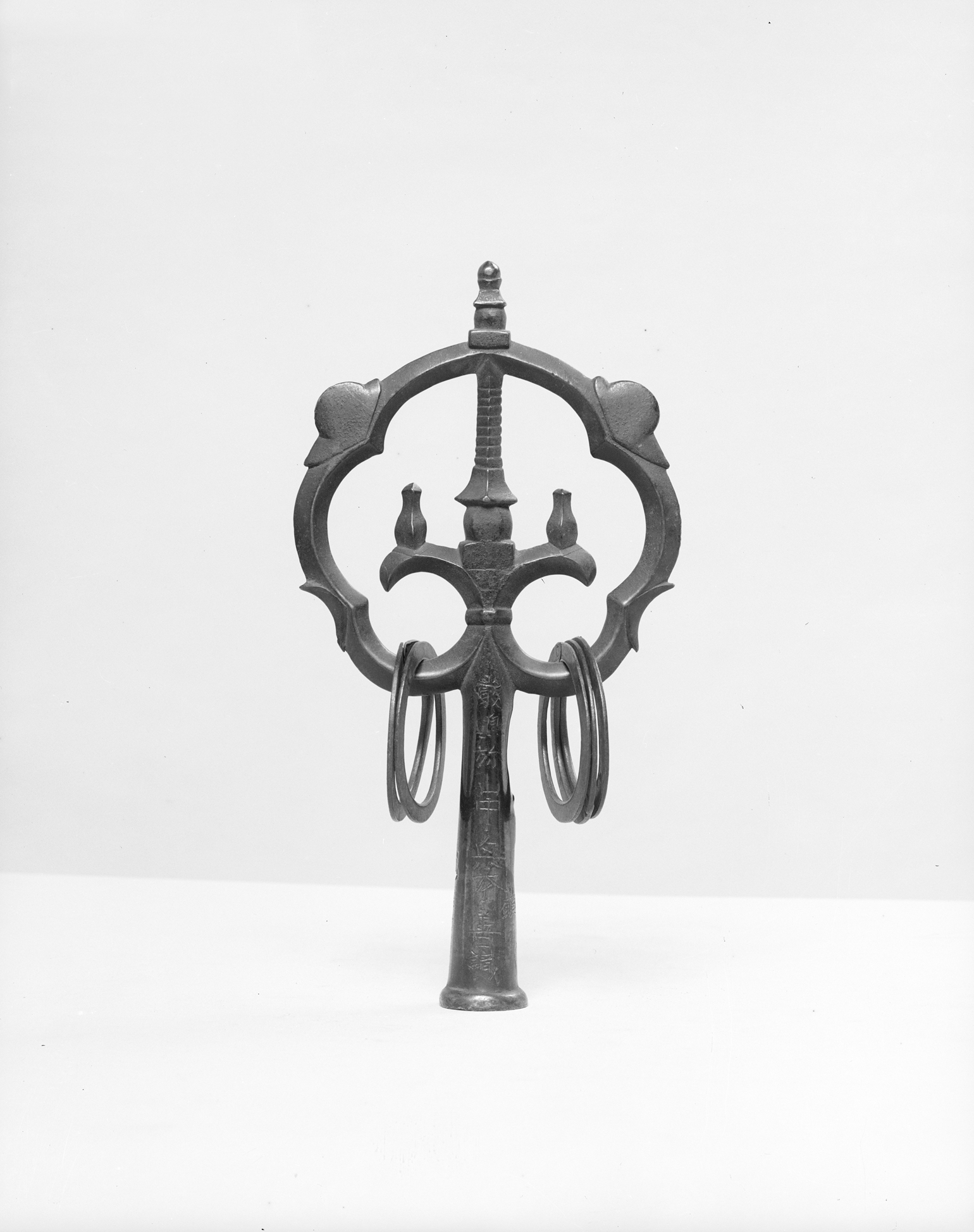
Bronze finial of a monk's ring staff (shakujō), Japan

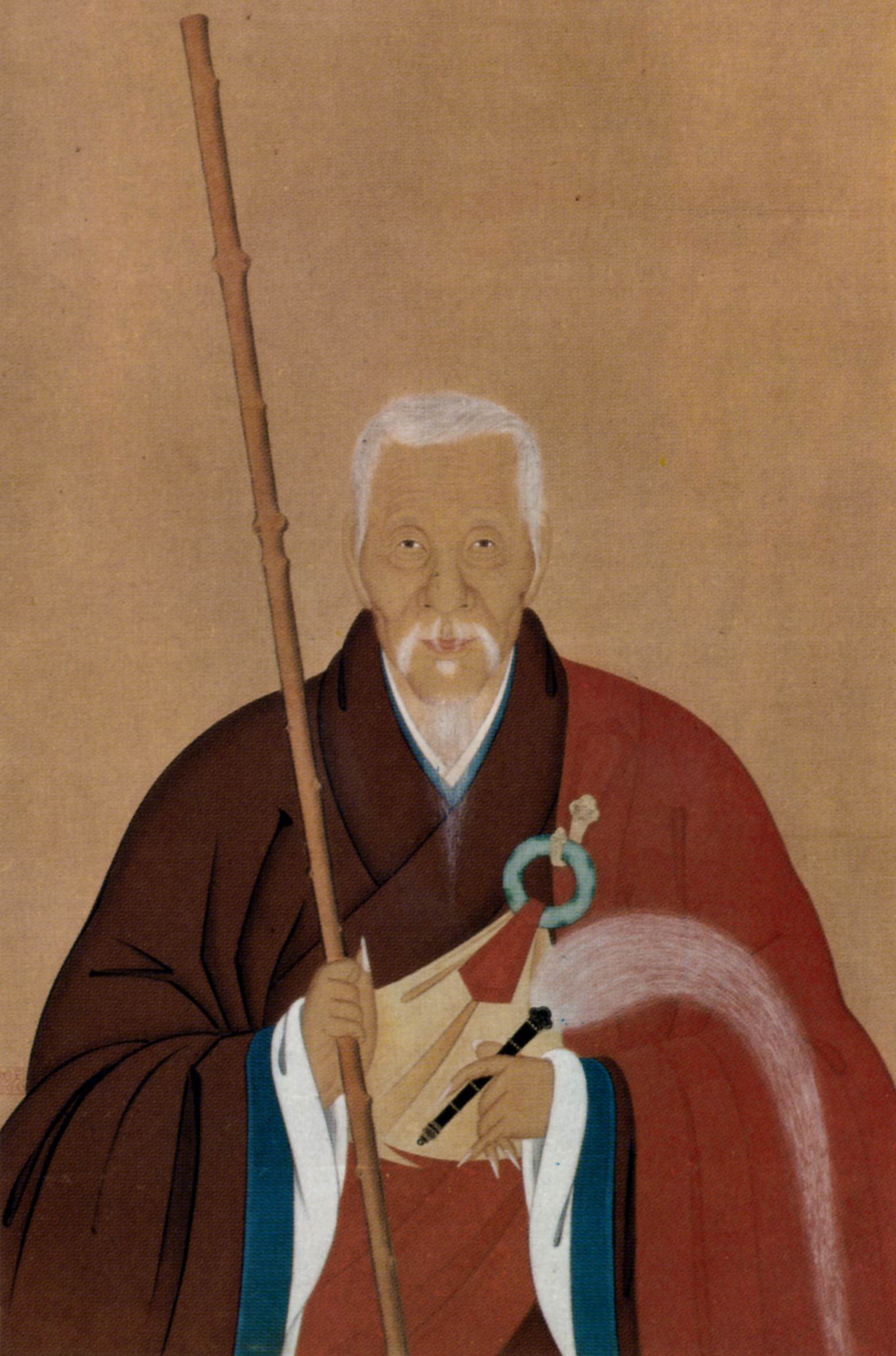
A portrait of Zen monk Ingen holding a wooden staff and a fly-whisk

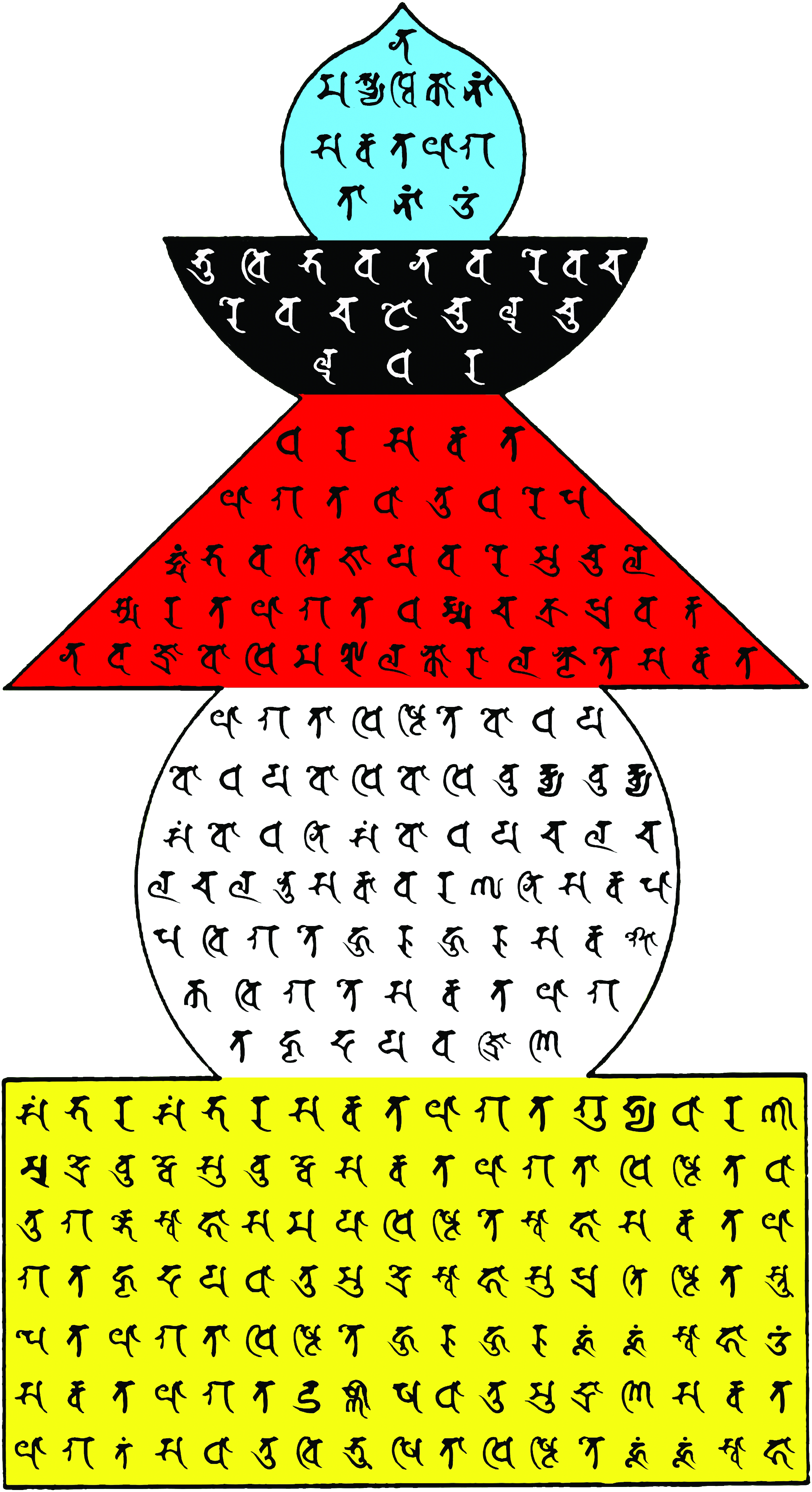
Casket Seal Dharani written on a five-wheel stupa, with colors representing the five elements

== Vajrayana Buddhist symbols ==
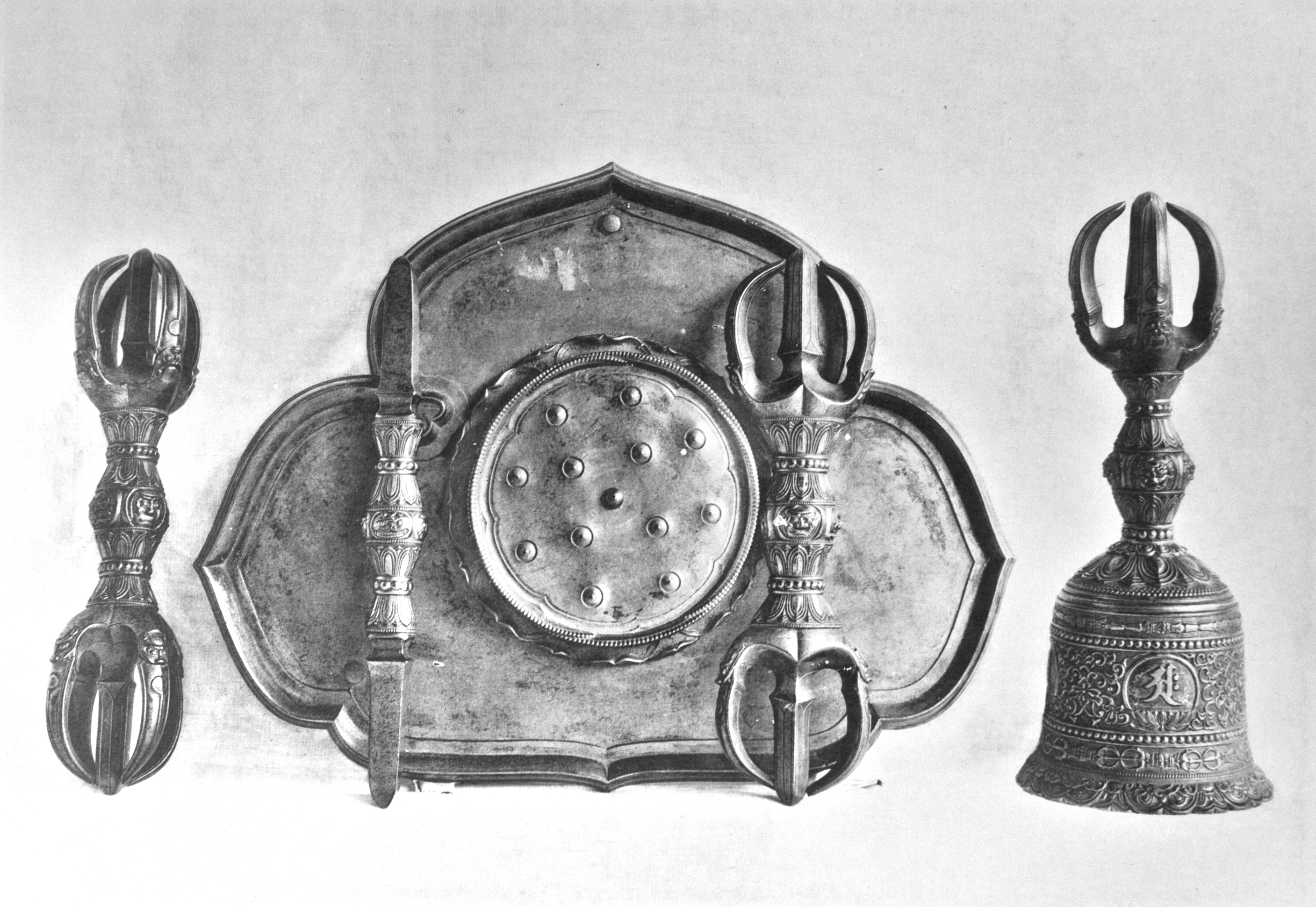
Five esoteric Buddhist ritual objects from Japan, including vajras, knife and bell.

A viśvavajra or "double vajra" appears in the emblem of Bhutan

Mantric Buddhism (Guhyamantra, "Secret Mantra") or Vajrayana has numerous esoteric symbols which are not common in other forms of Buddhism.

The vajra is a key symbol in Vajrayana Buddhism. It represents indestructibility (like a diamond), emptiness as well as power (like a thunder bolt, which was the weapon of the Vedic god Indra). According to Beer, it represents "the impenetrable, imperishable, immovable, immutable, indivisible, and indestructible state of absolute reality, which is the enlightenment of Buddhahood." The vajra is often paired with a bell (vajra-ghanta), which represents the feminine principle of wisdom. When paired together, they represent the perfect union of wisdom or emptiness (bell) and method or skilful means (vajra). There is also what is called the "crossed vajra" (vishva-vajra), which has four vajra heads emanating from a central hub.

Other tantric ritual symbols include the ritual knife (kila), tantric staff (khatvanga), the skull cup (kapala), the flaying knife (kartika), hand drum (damaru) and the thigh bone trumpet (kangling).

Other Vajrayana symbols popular in Tibetan Buddhism include the bhavacakra (wheel of life), mandalas, the number 108 and the Buddha eyes (or wisdom eyes) commonly seen on Nepalese stupas such as at Boudhanath.

There are various mythical creatures used in Vajrayana art as well: Snow Lion, Wind Horse, dragon, garuda and tiger. The popular mantra "Om mani padme hum" is widely used to symbolize compassion and is commonly seen inscribed on rocks, prayer wheels, stupas and art. In Dzogchen, the mirror is one important symbol of rigpa.

=== Tibetan Buddhist architecture ===
Eight types of Tibetan stupas

Tibetan Buddhist architecture is centered on the stupa, called in Tibetan Wylie: mchod rten, THL: chörten. The chörten consists of five parts that represent the mahābhūta (five elements). The base is square which represents the earth element, above that sits a dome representing water, on that is a cone representing fire, on the tip of the cone is a crescent representing air, inside the crescent is a flame representing ether. The tapering of the flame to a point can also be said to represent consciousness as a sixth element. The chörten presents these elements of the body in the order of the process of dissolution at death.

Tibetan temples are often three-storied. The three can represent many aspects such as the Trikaya (three aspects) of a Buddha. The ground story may have a statue of the historical Buddha Gautama and depictions of Earth and so represent the nirmāṇakāya. The first story may have Buddha and elaborate ornamentation representing rising above the human condition and the sambhogakāya. The second story may have a primordial Adi-Buddha in Yab-Yum (sexual union with his female counterpart) and be otherwise unadorned representing a return to the absolute reality and the dharmakāya "truth body".

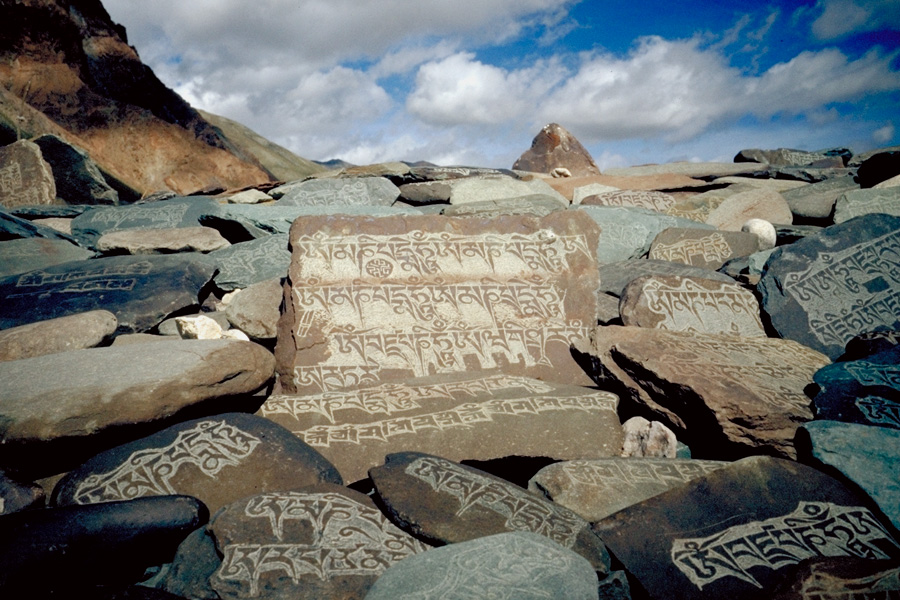
Mani stones

=== Colour in Tibetan Buddhism ===
In Tibetan Buddhist art, various colors and elements are associated with the five Buddha families and other aspects and symbols:

Colour	Symbolises	Buddha	Direction	Element	Transforming effect	Syllable
White	Purity, primordial being	Vairocana	East (or, in alternate system, North)	Space	Ignorance → Awareness of reality	Om
Green	Peace, protection from harm	Amoghasiddhi	North (or n/a)	Wind	jealousy → Accomplishing pristine awareness	Ma
Yellow	Wealth, beauty	Ratnasaṃbhava	South (or West)	Earth	Pride → Awareness of sameness	Ni
Blue (light and dark)	Knowledge, dark blue also awakening/enlightenment	Akṣobhya	Centre (or n/a)	Water	Anger → "Mirror-like" awareness	Pad
Red	Love, compassion	Amitābha	West (or South)	Fire	Attachment → Discernment/ discrimination	Me
Black	Death, death of ignorance, awakening/enlightenment	–	n/a (or East)	Air		Hum

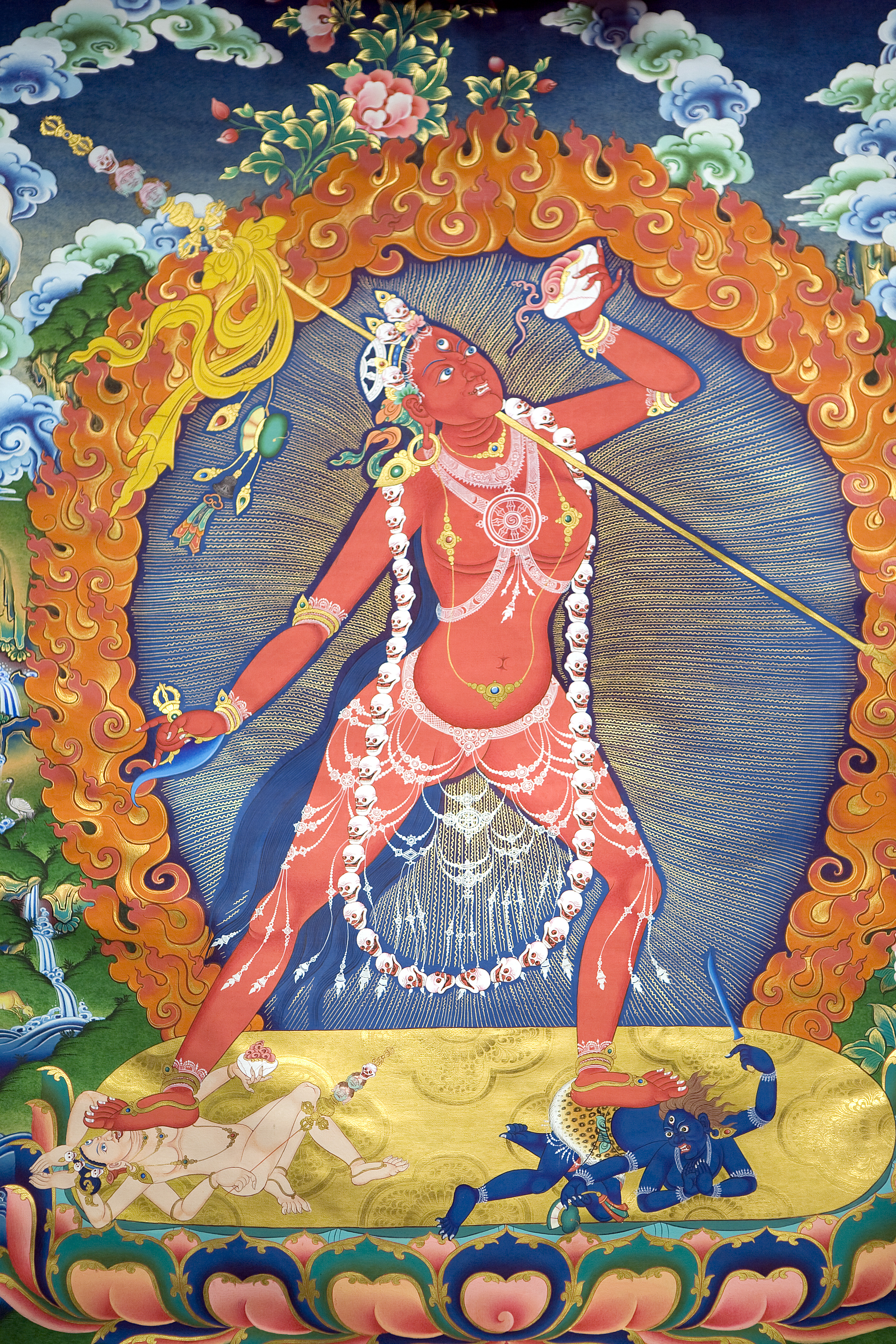
Vajrayogini, holding a flaying knife, a skull cup and tantric staff (khatvanga).

The five colors (Sanskrit pañcavarṇa – white, green, yellow, blue, red) are supplemented by several other colors including black and orange and gold (which is commonly associated with yellow). They are commonly used for prayer flags as well as for visualizing deities and spiritual energy, construction of mandalas and the painting of religions icons.

=== Indo-Tibetan visual art ===
Indo-Tibetan Buddhism visual art contains numerous esoteric figures and symbols. There are different types of visual art in Indo-Tibetan Vajrayana. Mandalas are genre of Buddhist art that contains numerous symbols and images in a circle and are an important element of tantric ritual. Thangkas are cloth paintings which are commonly used throughout the Indo-Tibetan Buddhist world.

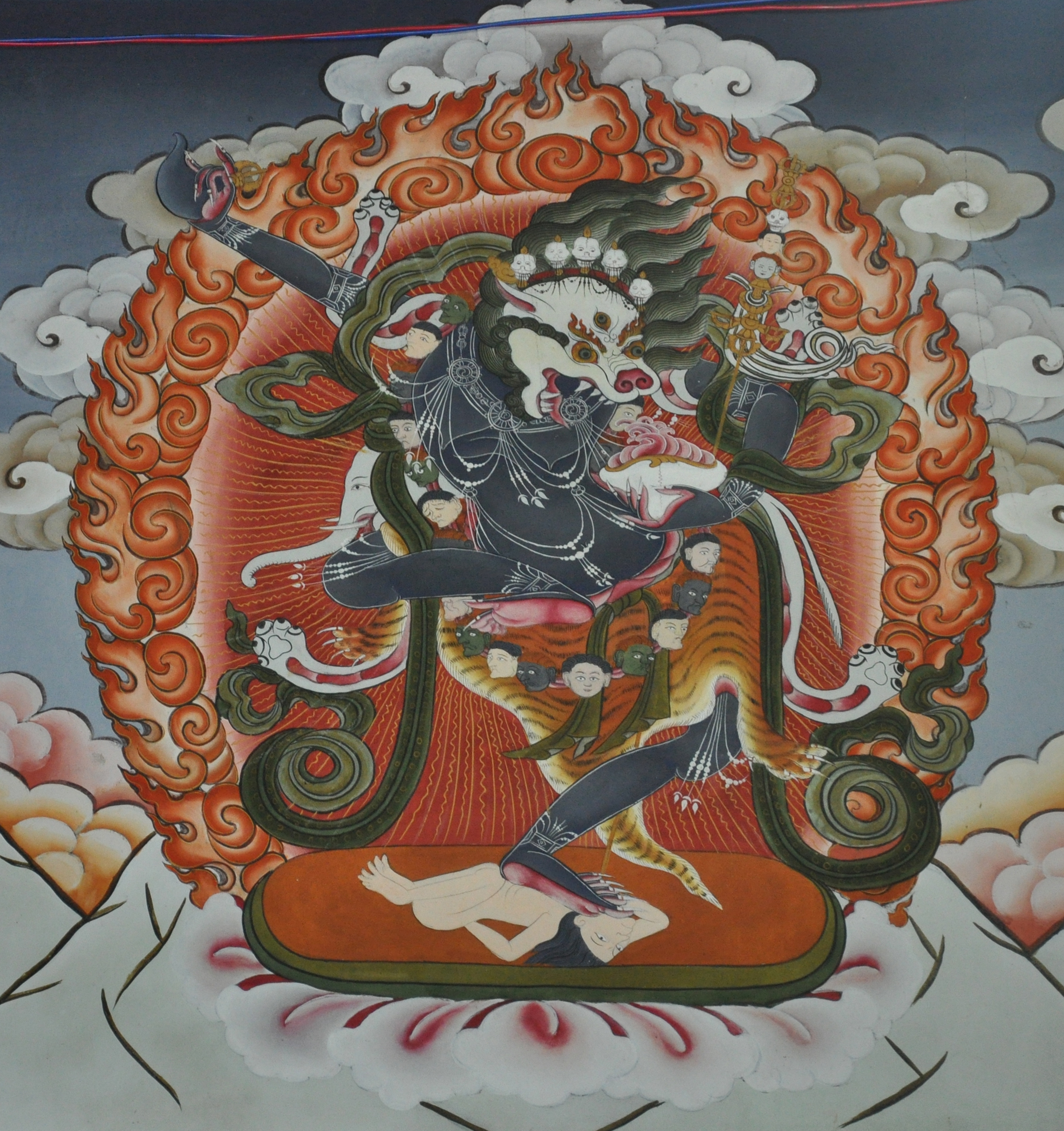
Lion faced Dakini, wrathful emanation of guru Rinpoche. Painting on the walls of 17th century Tawang Monastery, Tawang, Arunachal Pradesh, India.

Tibetan Buddhist deities may often assume different roles and are thus drawn, sculpted and visualized differently according to these roles. For example, Green Tara and White Tara which are different aspects of Tara that have different meanings. Green Tara is associated with protecting people from fear while the White Tara is associated with longevity. Shakyamuni Buddha may be seen in (pale) yellow or orange skin and Amitabha Buddha is typically red. These deities may also hold various attributes and implements in their hands, like flowers, jewels, bowls and sutras. Depictions of "wrathful deities" are often very fearsome, with monstrous visages, wearing skulls or bodily parts. They also may carry all sorts of weapons or fierce tools, like tridents, flaying knives and skull cups. The fierceness of these deities symbolizes the fierce energy needed to overcome ignorance.

Vajrayana Buddhism often specifies the number of feet of a Buddha or bodhisattva. While two is common there may also be ten, sixteen, or twenty-four feet. The position of the feet/legs may also have a specific meaning such as in Green Tara who is typically depicted as seated partly cross-legged but with one leg down symbolising "immersion within in the absolute, in meditation" and readiness to step forth and help sentient beings by "engagement without in the world through compassion".

=== Gallery ===
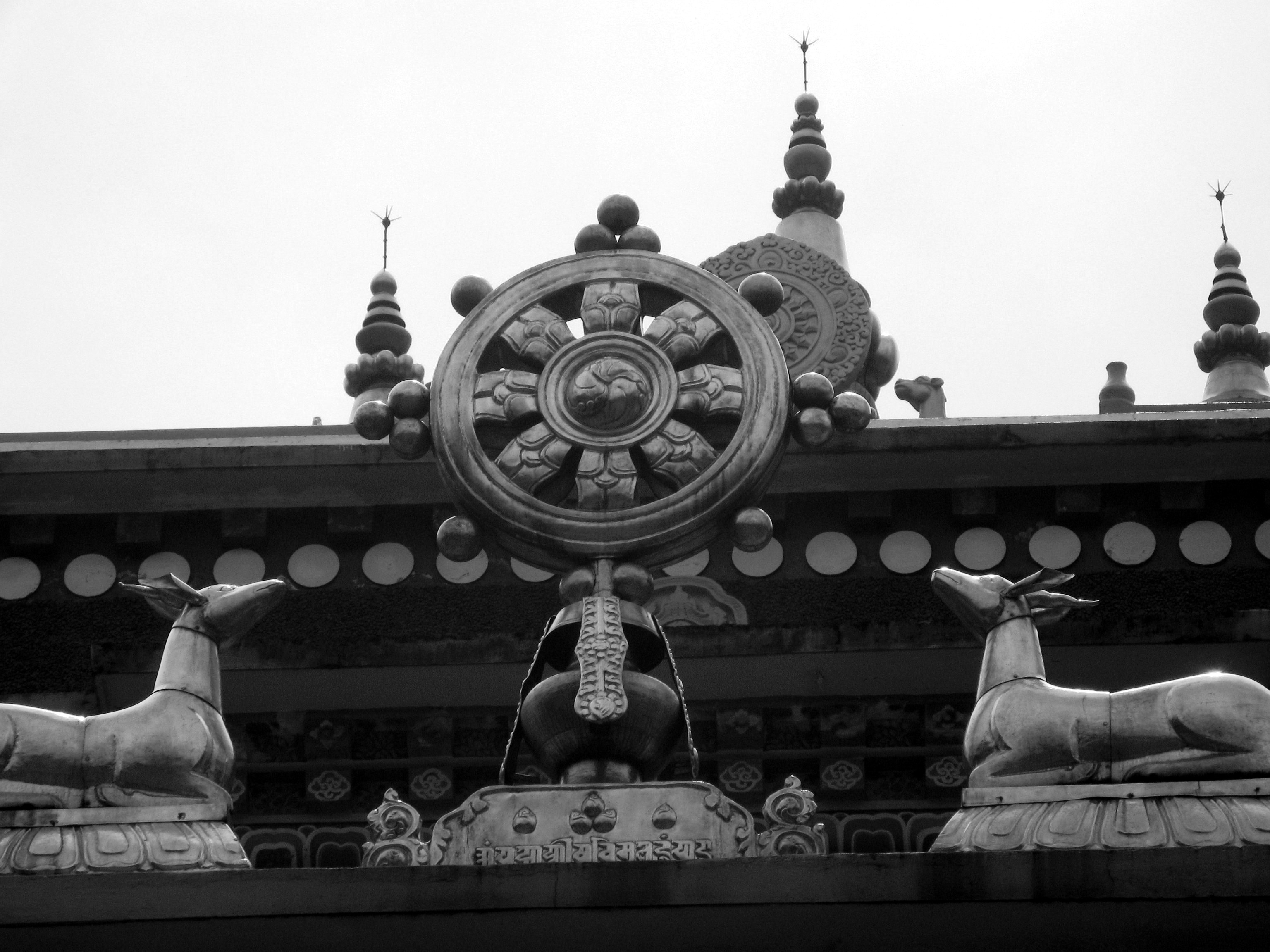
Tibetan style Dharma wheel with two deer

Tibetan style Triratna, three jewels

Om mani padme hum in Tibetan script

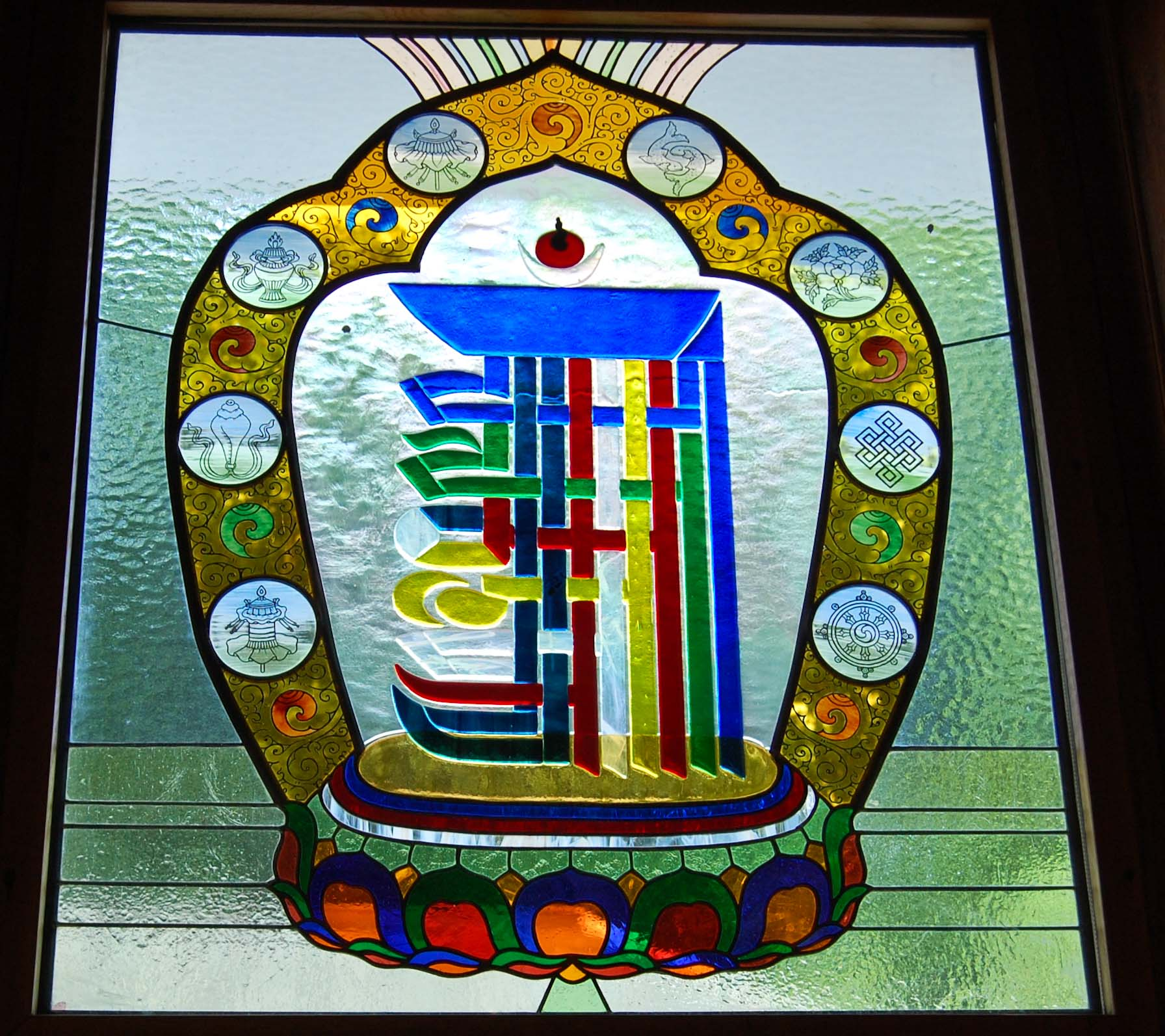
Symbol of Kalachakra

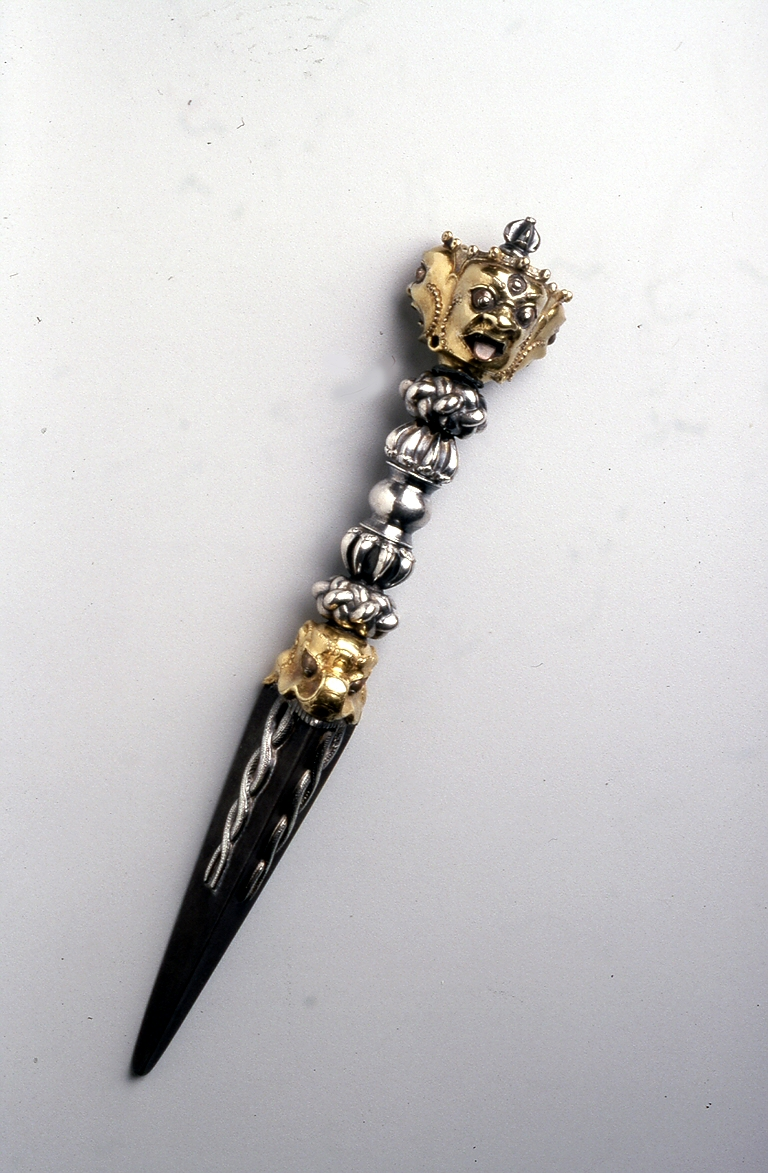
Kila dagger

The Flag of Tibet, in use between 1912 and 1950, with two snow lions and the three jewels.

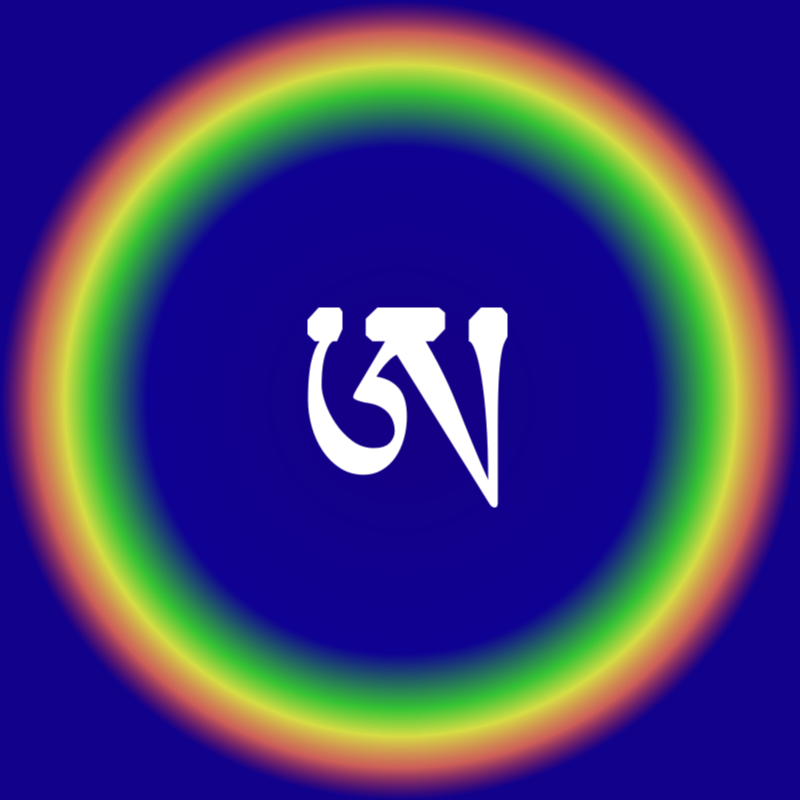
In Tibetan Dzogchen thought, rigpa is symbolized by the white A inside of a circular rainbow.

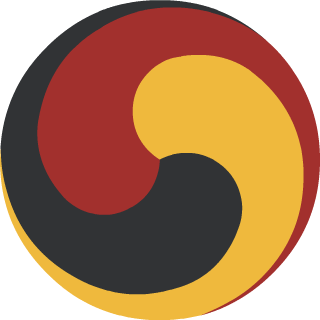
Gankyil, wheel of joy

State emblem of Mongolia with windhorse, three jewels and dharma wheel

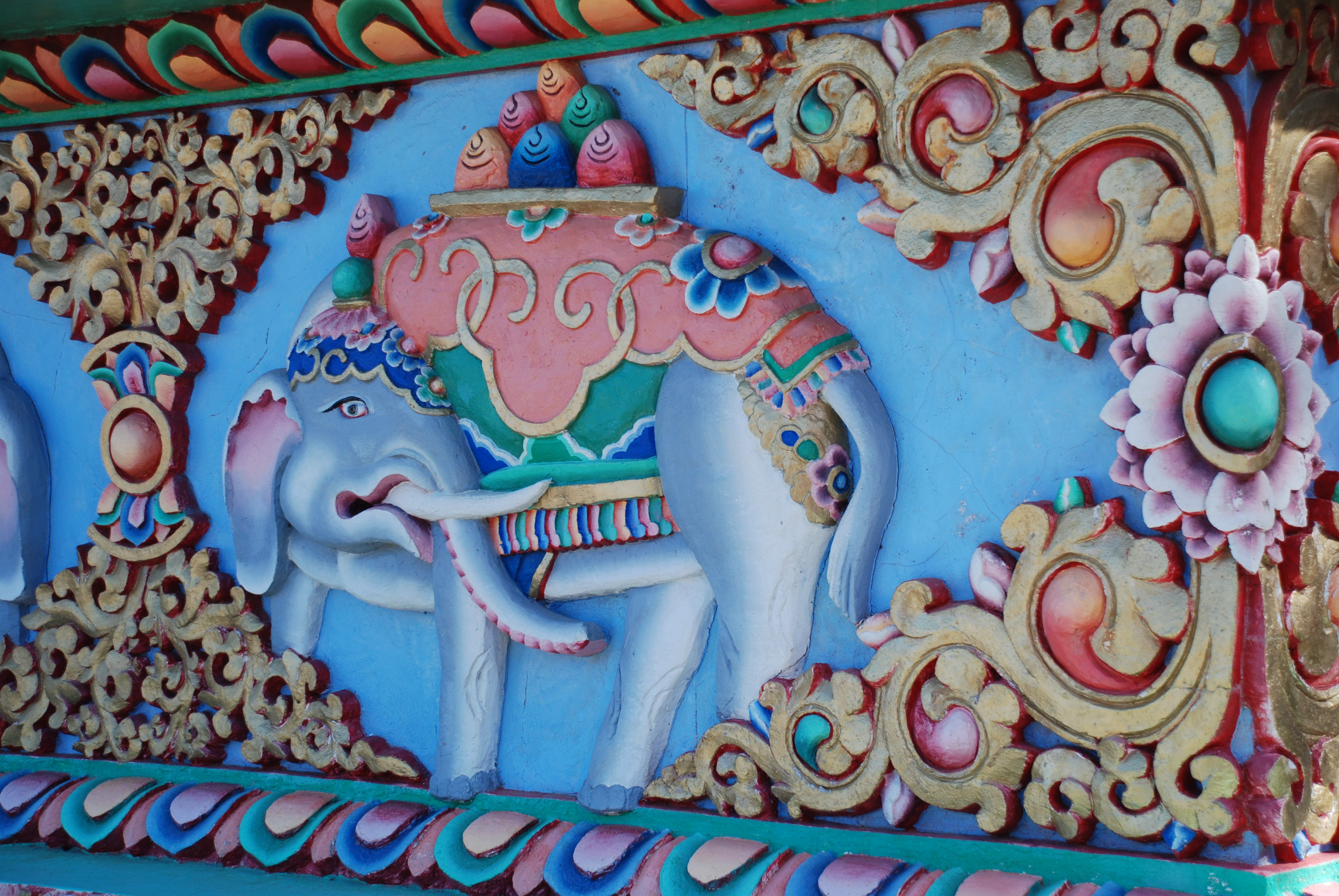
White elephant with mani (jewels)

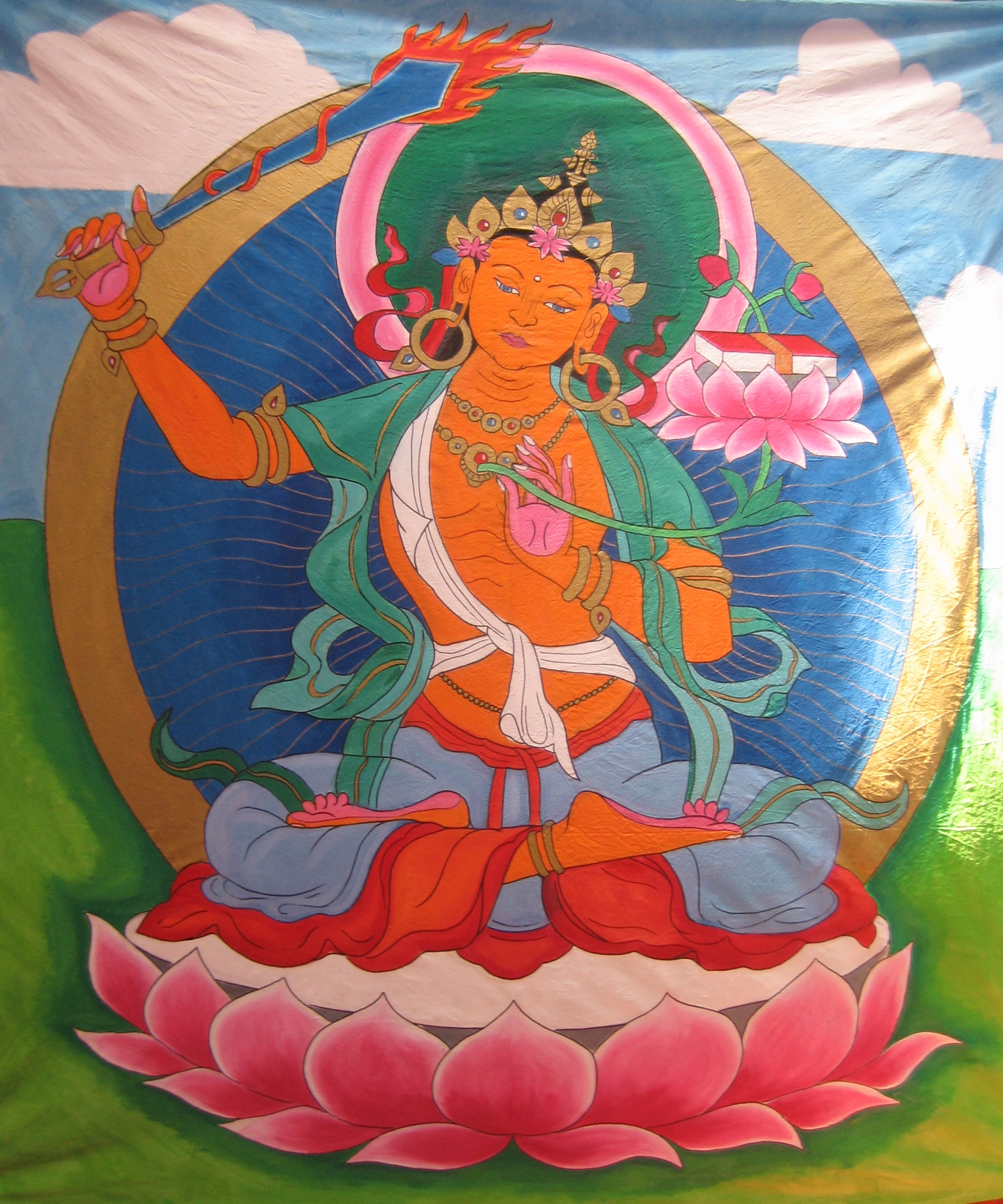
Manjushri with the flaming sword symbolizing prajna (wisdom).

Kartika, a ritual implement associated with dakinis

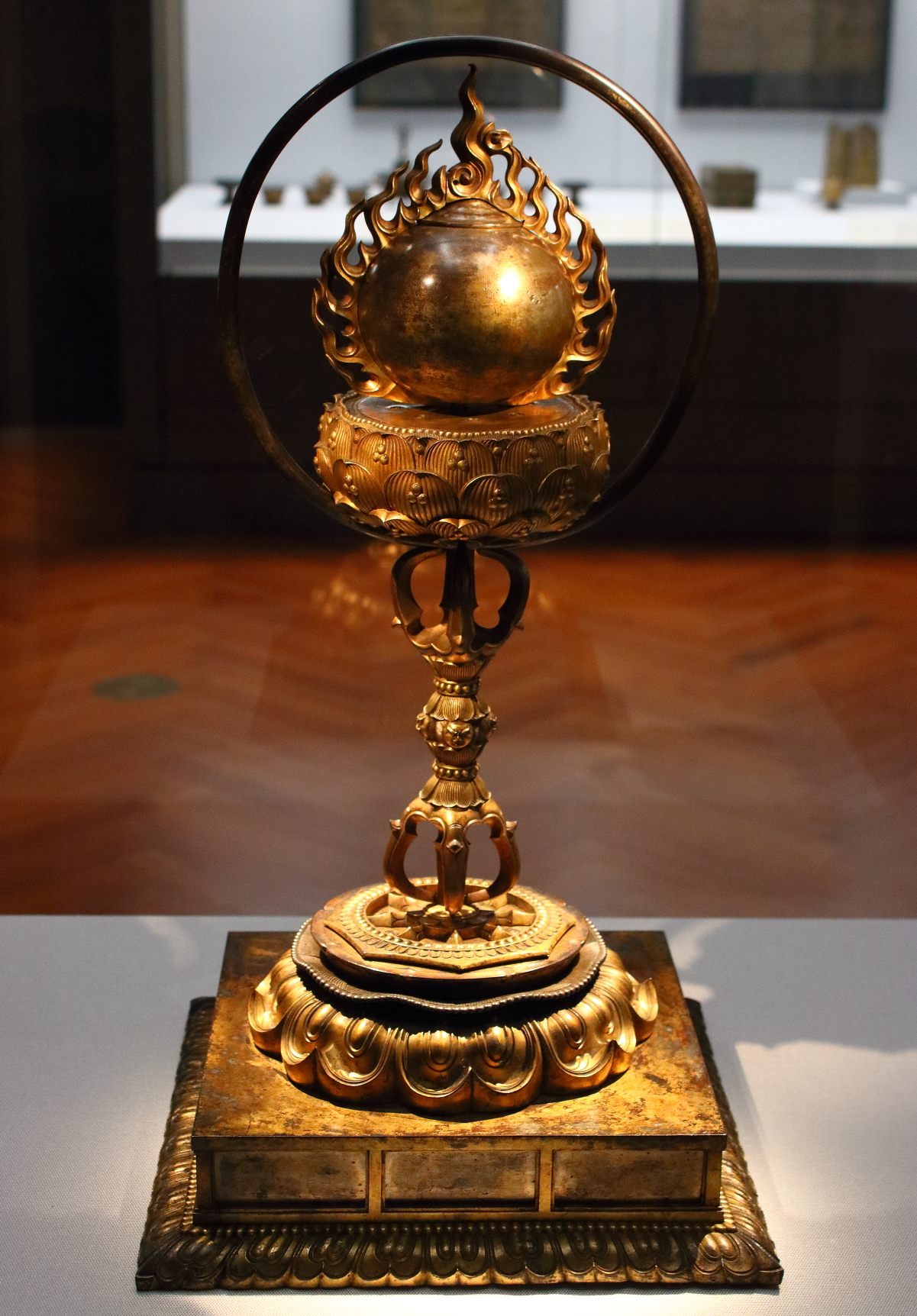
Container for Buddhist Relics in Shape of Flaming Sacred Jewel

== Symbolic physical attributes ==
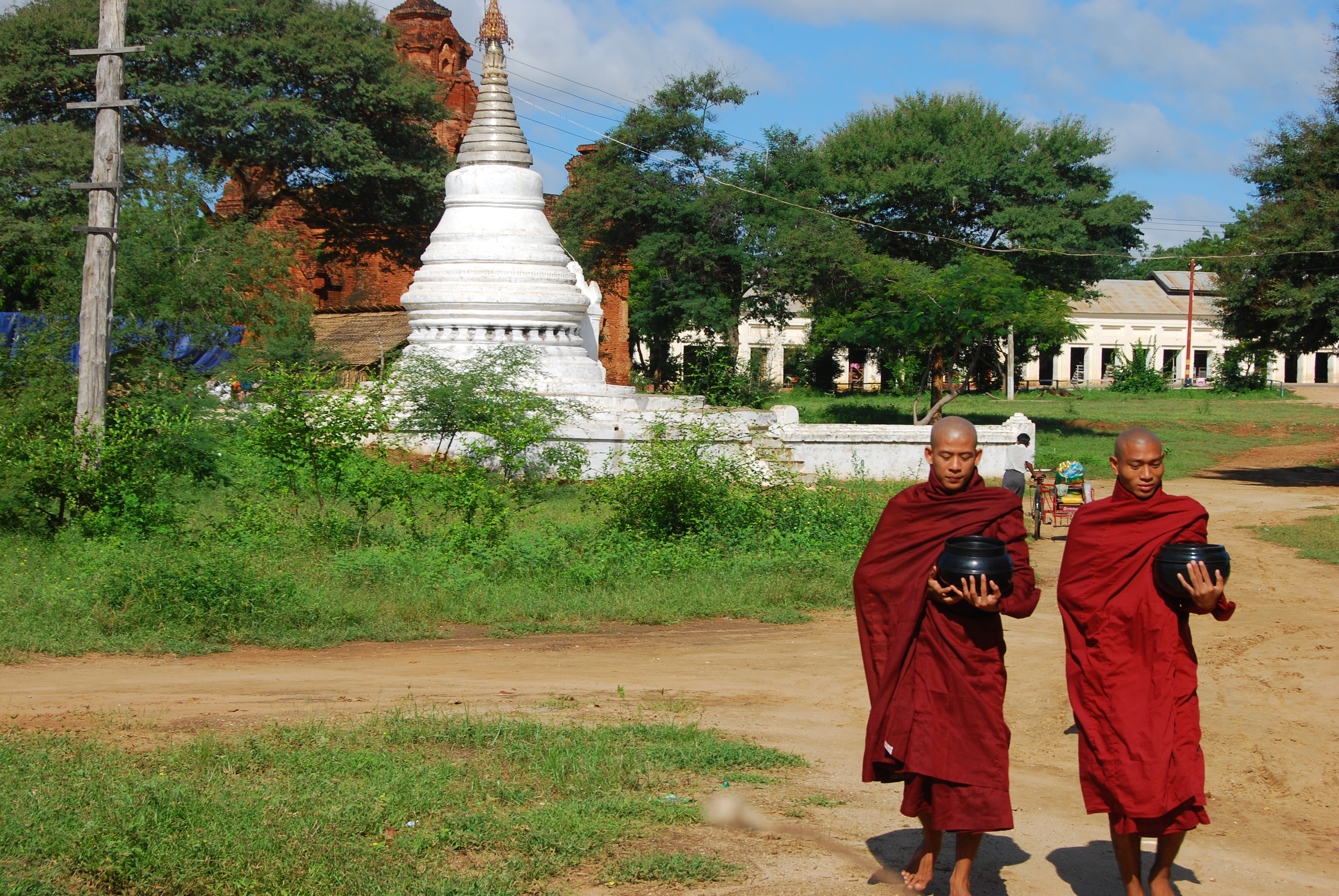
Two Burmese Buddhist monks

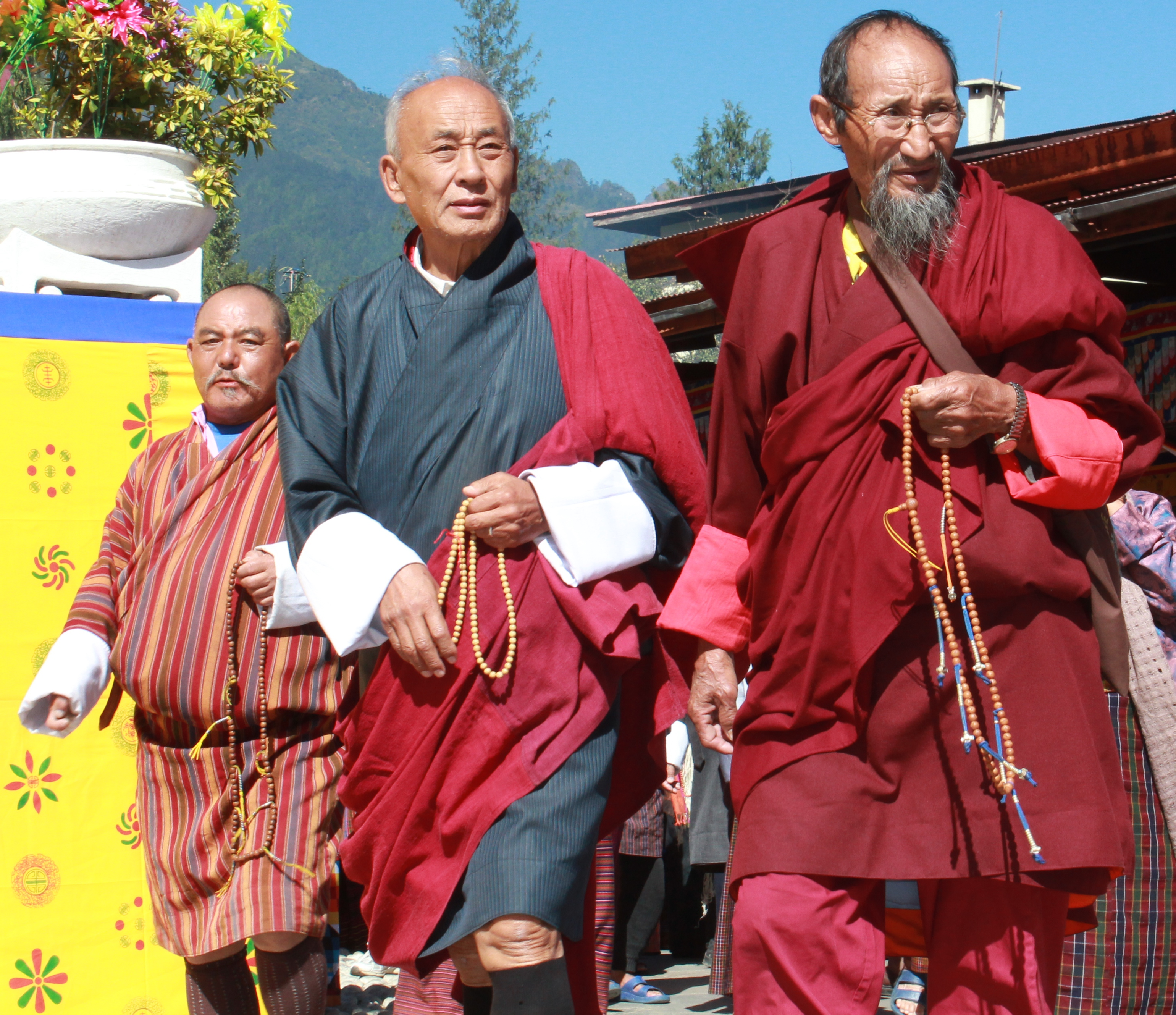
Tibetan Buddhists with prayer beads (mala)

Buddhist material and visual culture as well as ritual tools (such as robes and bells) have often developed various symbolic meanings which are commonly shared by Buddhist sects around the world.

=== Robes and baldness ===
The style and design of the robes of a monastic often indicate the sect of Buddhism, tradition or country, they belong to. In most Buddhist cultures, the Buddhist monastic robe represents a renunciant monastic. Different traditions, sects of Buddhism (and different countries) will have robes of different colors as well as different styles or ways on how they wear it. Once Buddhism spread throughout China back in sixth century BCE, it was seen as wrong to show that much skin, and that's when robes to cover both arms with long sleeves came in to play. In Tibet, they have changed over time and they show both their shoulders as well as having a two-piece attire rather than one. Shortly thereafter, Japan integrated a bib along with their long sleeve robe called a koromo. This was a clothing piece made specifically for their school of Zen which they practice in Takahatsu that involves the monks of Japan wearing a straw hat.

Shaving one's head is another ritual and symbolic act most Buddhist monastics complete before entering a monastic order. To shave one's head merely signifies ones readiness to enter into the monastic path and abandon the worldly life.

=== Tools ===
Buddhist monks traditionally carry an alms bowl, and this is another common symbol of Buddhist monastics around the world (even though not all modern Buddhist traditions make use of the traditional practice of collecting alms as the source of their daily nutriment).

In all sects of Buddhism, bells are often used to signify the start of rituals or to mark time. They use the bell to keep away the bad spirits and have the Buddha protect them at the time of their ritual. Some sects call this a part of the "Mystic Law" which is the beginning of a Buddhist ritual. Other ritual tools include drums, wooden fish, trumpets, the keisaku, and the tantric vajra and bell.

=== Physical gestures ===
Another form of symbolism of the Buddhist is the joining of your hands together at prayer or at the time of the ritual (añjali mudrā). Buddhist compare their fingers with the petals of the lotus flower. Bowing down is another form of symbolic position in the act of the ritual, when Buddhists bow in front of the Buddha or to another person they are not bowing at the physical (the human or the statue) but they are bowing at the Buddha inside of them (the human) or it (the statue).

Mudras are another form of physical hand expression in the Buddhist faith, used to evoke a particular state of mind in buddhist practice. The most recognized mundras are seen in artistic depictions of the Buddha. Every mundra has a symbolic function and an inner symbolic function, for communication to the practitioner as well as those who perceive it. In Buddhist ceremonies, a mundra acts as a form of visual "seal," affirming a faithful vow such as warding off evil spirits. They often accompany mantras when used in practice.

== Notable symbols ==
Buddhist flag

=== Buddhist flag ===
The five-colored flag was designed in Sri Lanka in the 1880s with the assistance of Henry Steel Olcott. The six vertical bands of the flag represent the six colors of the aura which Buddhists believe emanated from the body of the Buddha when he attained Enlightenment.

=== Dharma wheel ===
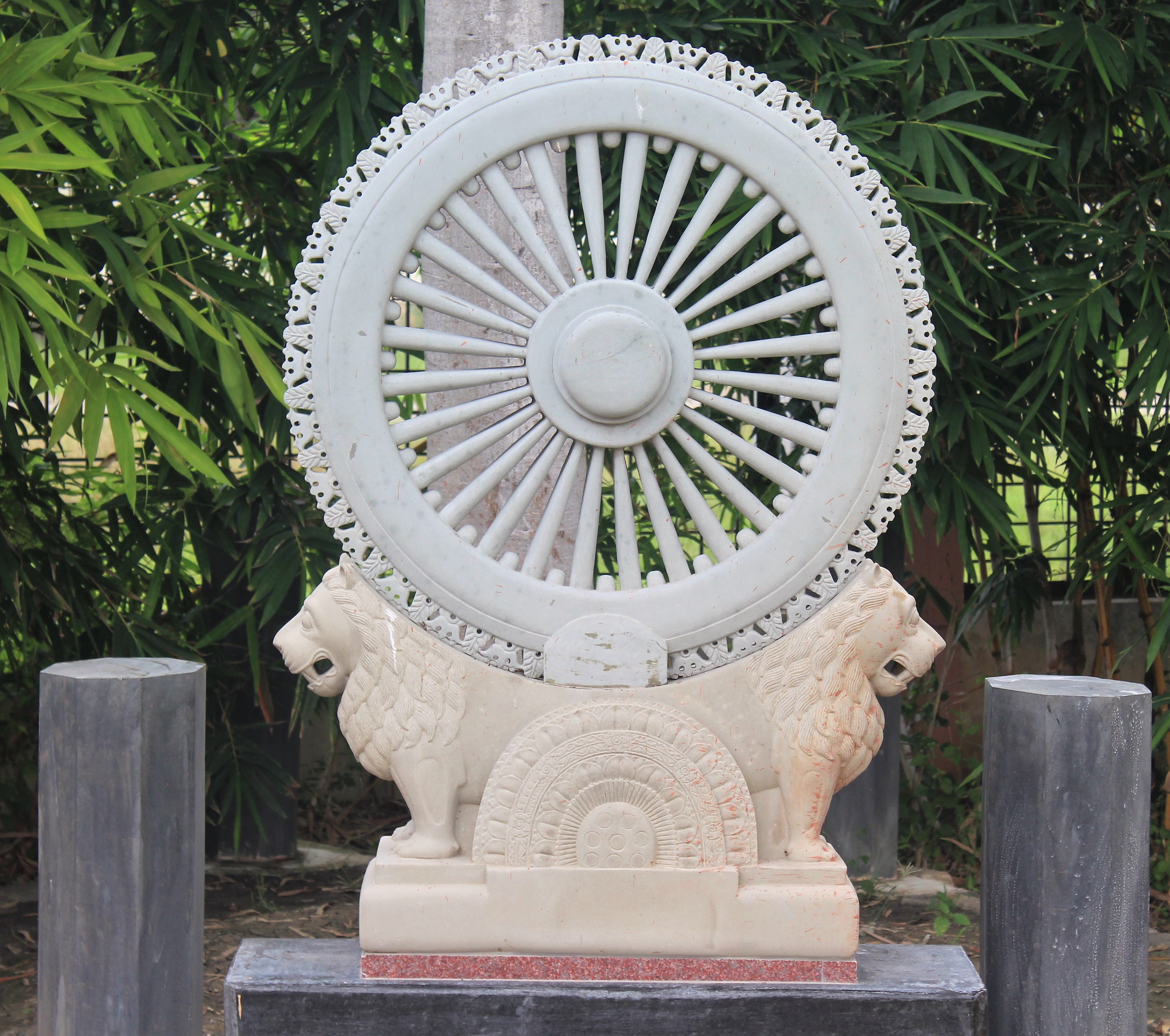
A Dharma Wheel with a lotus half-roundel and lion base, from Amaravati.

The Dharma wheel (dharma-chakra) is one of the earliest Buddhist symbols. It is an ancient Indian symbol of sovereignty and auspiciousness (as well as the sun god Surya) which pre-dates Buddhism and was adopted by early Buddhists. It appears in early Buddhist sites such as Sanchi and Bharhut, where it is a symbol of the Buddha himself. The Dharma wheel also represents the Dharma (Buddha's teaching, the ultimate truth). The main idea of this symbol is that the Buddha was seen as a person who "turned the wheel", which signifies a great and revolutionary moment in history (i.e. the teaching of the Buddha's Dharma at Varanasi). While the Buddha could have become a great king, he instead chose to become a great sage. Illustrations from early Buddhist sites as well as Buddhist texts like the Mahavamsa, indicate that the worship of Dharma wheels on pillars ("wheel pillars", cakrastambha) was a common practice in early Buddhism.

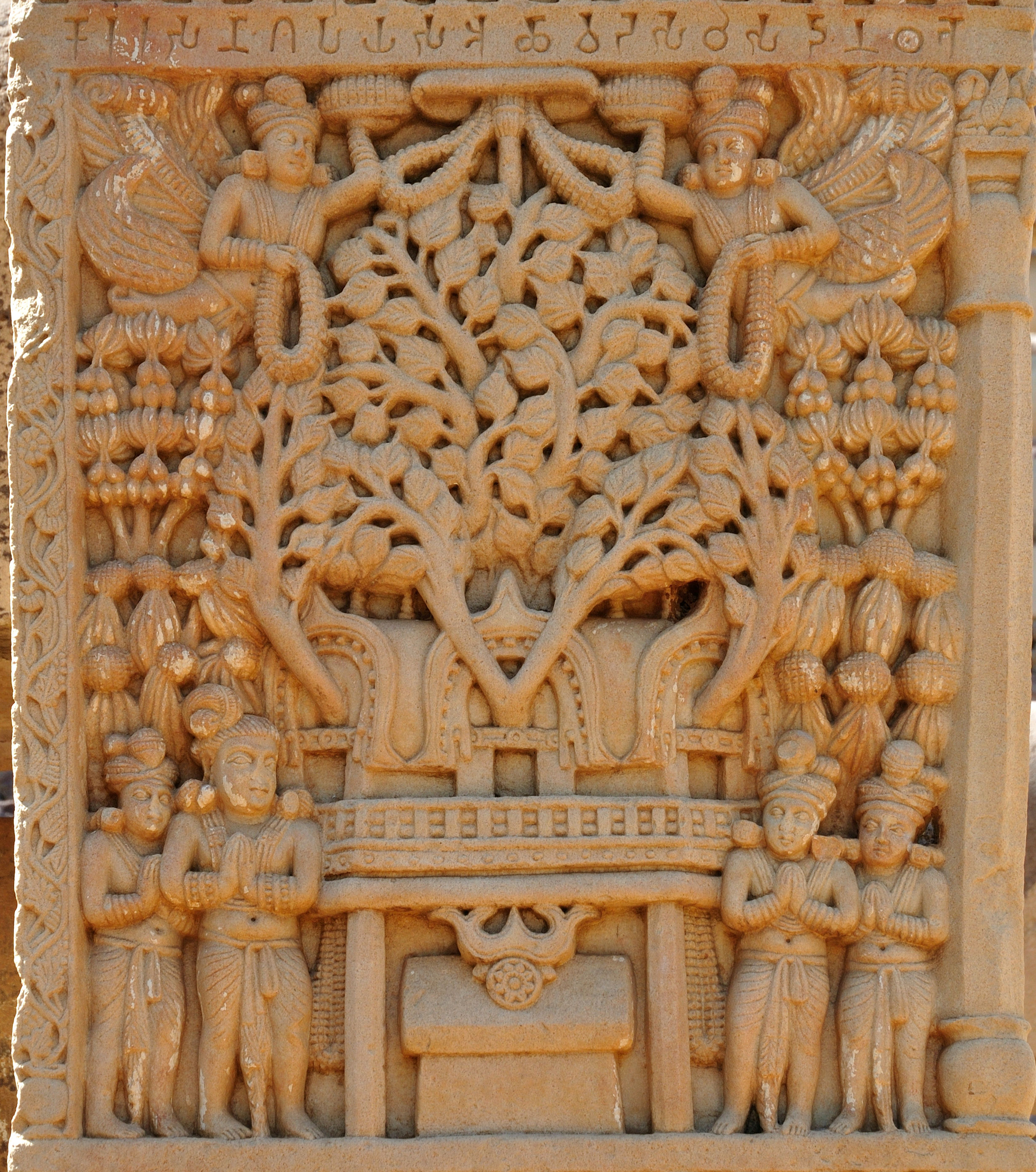
Bodhi tree from Sanchi complex topped with a chatra (royal umbrella)

The Dharma wheel is thus also a royal symbol, indicating a king who is a chakravartin ("Turner of the Wheel"). In the Buddhist scriptures, it is described as a royal treasure of great, world class kings, a perfect wheel with a thousand spokes. Because of this, it was thus also used by the Mauryans, especially Ashoka (in the Pillars of Ashoka). According to Karlsson "the association between the numbers of the spokes and a special Buddhist doctrine is a later interpretation and not present in early Buddhist art." Early Buddhist depictions contain wheels with various number of spokes (8, 16, 20, 25 and 32).

=== Bodhi tree ===
The Bodhi Tree (Pali: bodhirukka) was a ficus (ficus religiosa) which stood is on the spot where the Buddha reached awakening ("bodhi"), called the bodhimanda (place of awakening). This tree has been venerated since early Buddhist times and a shrine was built for it. Offerings to the Buddha were offered to the tree. The Bodhi tree (often paired with an empty seat or āsana) thus represents the Buddha himself, as well as liberation and nirvana. Branches and saplings from the Bodhi tree were sent to other regions as well. It is said that when the Buddha was born, the Bodhi tree sprung up on the bodhimanda at the same time. The worship of trees is an ancient Indian custom which can be found as far back as in the Indus Valley Civilization.

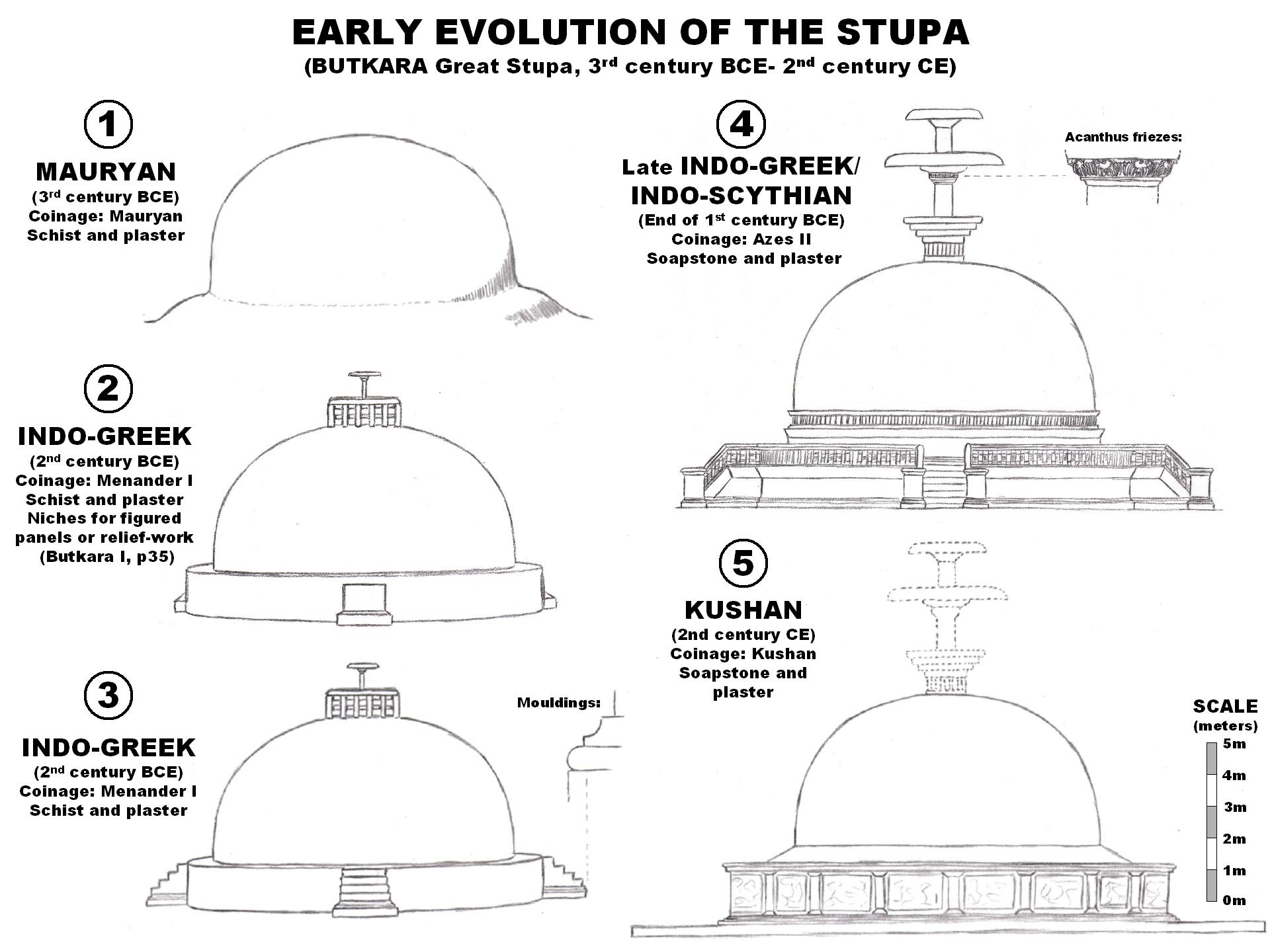
The development of the Butkara Stupa; note the addition of more elaborate chatras (royal umbrella)

=== Stupa ===
Stūpas (literally "heap") are domed structures which may derive from ancient Indian funerary mounds. The earliest Buddhist stupas are from about the 3rd century BCE. In the early Buddhist texts, the Buddha's bodily relics (śarīra, the bones leftover from cremation) were said to have been placed in various stūpas and therefore, Buddhist stūpas are generally symbolic of the Buddha himself, particularly his passing away (final nirvana). It may even have been a belief of some early Buddhists that the presence of the Buddha or the Buddha's power could be found in a stūpa.

Other relics belonging to the Buddha's disciples were also enclosed in caskets and placed in stupas. Caskets with relics of Sariputta and Moggallana were found in Sanchi stupa number 3, while stupa number 2 contains a casket with relics from 10 monks (according to inscriptions). Stūpa were venerated by Buddhists, with offerings of flowers and the like.

Initially, Buddhist stūpas were simple domes which developed more elaborate and complex forms in later periods. Over time, the style and design of the stūpa evolved into unique and distinct regional styles (such as Asian pagodas and Tibetan chortens).

=== Animals ===
==== Lion ====
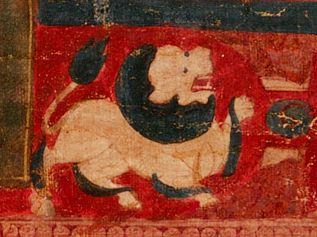
Snow Lion, one of the types of Lions in Buddha symbolism.

Early Buddhist art contains various animals. These include lions, nāgas, horses, elephants, and deer. Most of these are often symbolic of the Buddha himself (and some are epithets of the Buddha), though they may also be depicted as merely decorative illustrations depending on context. According to Jampa Choskyi, while the animals are considered to be symbols for the Buddha, lions are the symbols of the bodhisattvas or also known as the sons of the Buddha. Though the lion, is a symbol of royalty, sovereignty, and protection, is used as a symbol for the Buddha, who is also known as the "lion of the Shakyas". Buddha's teachings are referred to as the "Lion's Roar" (sihanada) in the sutras, which symbolizes the supremacy of the Buddha's teaching over all other spiritual teachings. When looking at the shrines on the iconography, the lions symbolize another role, which they are considered the bodhisattvas who can be seen as the sons of the Buddha.

==== Elephant ====
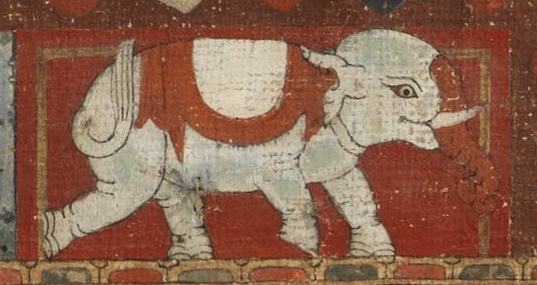
Tibetan painting of a Buddhist elephant

The Buddha was also symbolized by a white elephant, another Indian symbol of royal power. This symbol appears in the myth of Queen Maya when the Buddha takes the form of a white elephant to enter his mother's womb. Though the characteristics that are emphasized are the animal's strength and steadfastness, these are the ones that become the symbol for the individual's mental and physical strength. The other way that the elephant is also a symbol of responsibility and earthiness. When looking at the myth in India about elephants, the way that the myth goes is that the Airavata and the flying elephants would be used as a vehicle for transportation. The elephant was said to be seen seemingly emerging from the white ocean, these animals were seen as having special powers with one being the ability to produce rain. Not only, were they considered to have the power to produce rain, in Indian society, but they were also are a symbol of good luck and prosperity, and since they were Kings would own them and even used them in wars. The white elephant can also be seen as a symbol of mental strength, the elephant would start as a gray elephant that is rampant when the mind is uncontrollable. As the individual continues to practice dharma and can tame their mind, the gray elephant now becomes a white one, which is a symbol for strong and powerful, who only destroys in the directions that are willed by the individual. The tusks are also seen as an emblem of the Seven Royal Emblems. However, Gangpati or Ganesh is known to be an elephant-faced deity which is a form of the bodhisattva of Avalokitesvara. While, the elephant is seen as a deity when in the form of Avalokitesvara, the animal has used transportation for Tathagata Aksobhya and the deity Balabadra. Like the lion, the elephant is seen as a guardian of temples and the Buddha.

==== Horse ====
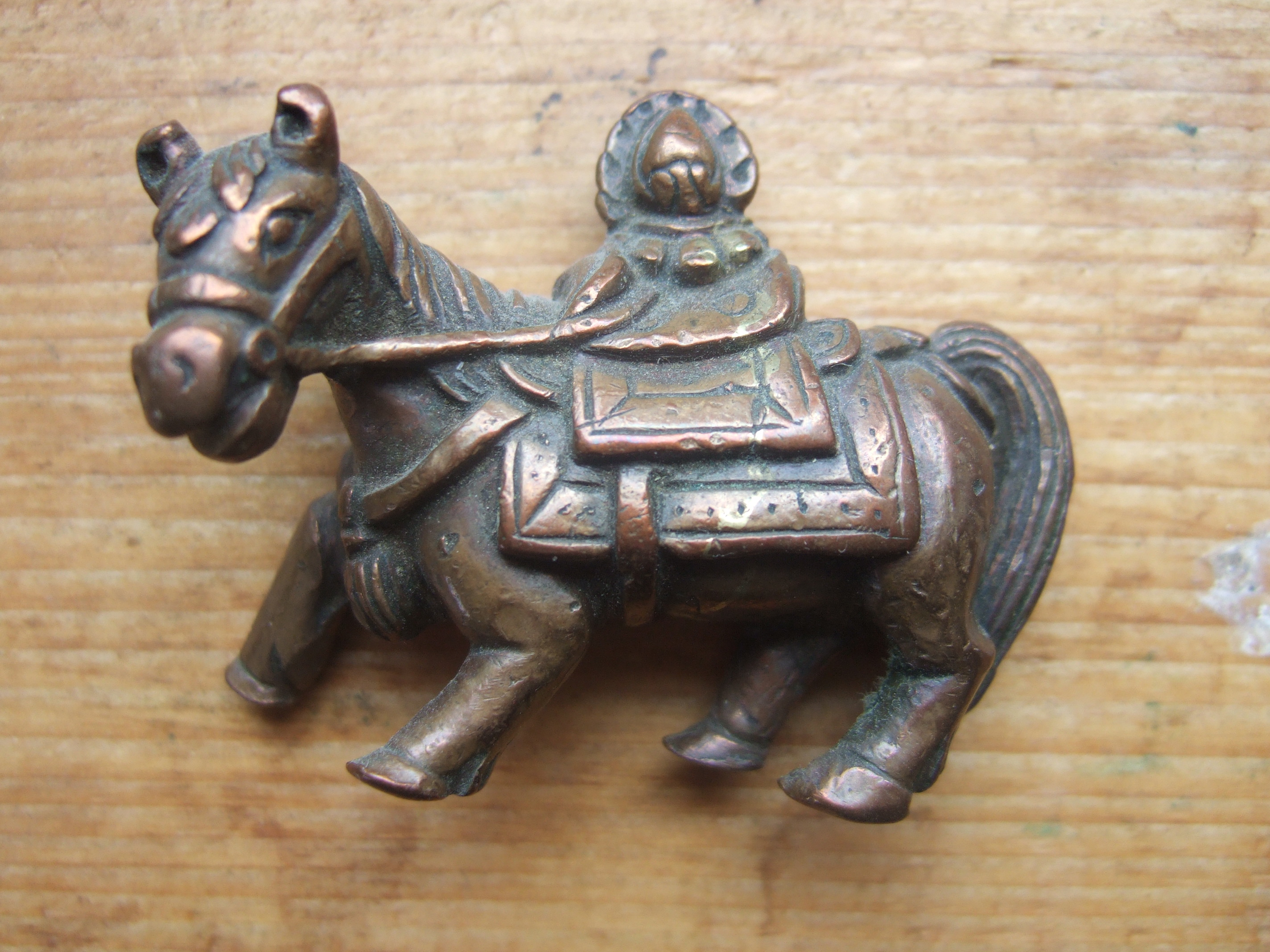
Tibetan bronze statue of a windhorse

Some of the characteristics that are emphasized about the horse are their loyalty, industriousness. and swiftness. These characteristics can be seen in the riderless horse (representing the Buddha's royal horse, Kanthaka) symbolizes the Buddha's renunciation, and can be seen in some depictions of the "Great Renunciation" scene (along with Chandaka, the Buddha's attendant holding up a royal umbrella). Meanwhile, deer represent Buddhist disciples, as the Buddha gave his first sermon at the deer park of Varanasi. In terms of Buddhism, the horse is a symbol of energy and effort when practicing dharma, along with the air or Prana that will run through the channels of the body. The "Wind Horse" is the transportation of the mind and can be ridden on. The deity that is associated with the horse is Lokesvara also known as Avalokitesvara, who also takes the form of a horse. When looking at Buddhist iconography, the horse is seen supporting the throne of Tathagatha Ratnasambhava. While they are used for support for Tathagatha Ratnasambhava, the animal is used as transportation for deities and dharma protectors, known as Mahali and the horse-faced deities, an example of this is Hayagriva.

==== Naga ====
The Buddha is also often called a "great nāga" in the sutras, which is a mythical serpent-like being with magical powers. However, this term is also generally indicative of the greatness and magical power of the Buddha, whose psychic power (siddhi) is greater than that of all gods (devas), nature spirits (yakkha), or nāgas. Another important nāga is Mucalinda, king of the nāgas, who is known for having protected the Buddha from storms.

==== Peacock ====
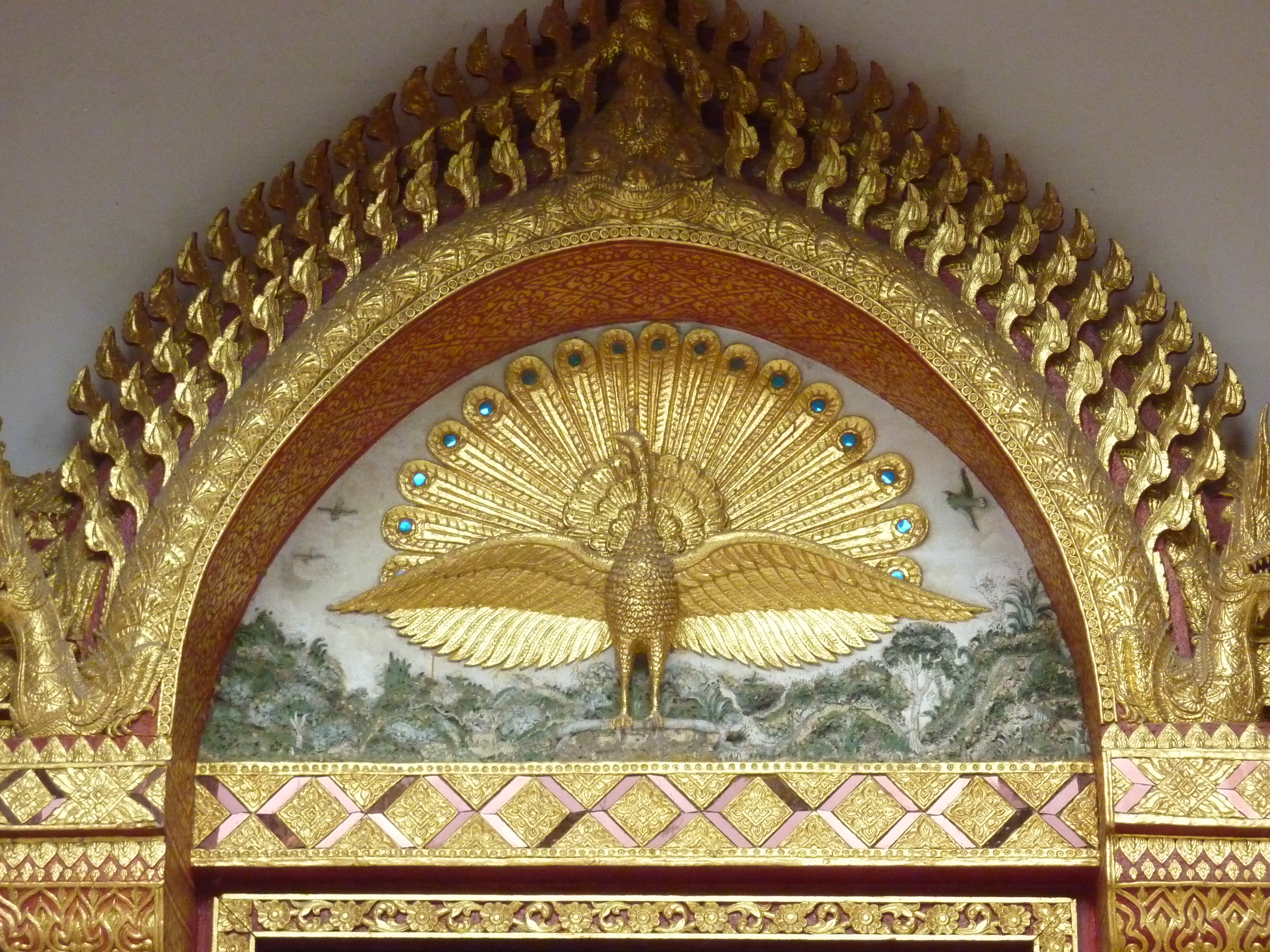
Peacock Gable, Wat Phra That Doi Suthep, Chiang Mai

The peacock has multiple distinctly different symbols for which it is considered in different parts of the world and religions; however, in Buddhism, the peacock is a symbol of wisdom. The way they are connected to the bodhisattvas is by the peacock's ability to eat a poisonous plant without getting affected by the plant, which correlates with the bodhisattva's path toward enlightenment. The bodhisattva's path begins with delusions, ignorance, desire, lastly hatred, which all can be translated into moha, raga, dvesa. The opening of the colorful tail of the peacock can be compared to the enlightenment of the bodhisattva. The tradition that comes with the symbol of the peacock is when the bodhisattva becomes enlightened. The bodhisattva's body is adorned with five brightly colored feathers (red, blue, green, and others) that can be seen on the body. During the ceremony, the bodhisattva eats the same poisonous plants as the peacock, as it happens, the feathers slowly change colors since, like the peacock, these individuals are not worried about the harm that may come to them. Essentially the peacock is a symbol of the change from the path of desire to the path of liberation. The deities that are associated with the peacock is Amitabha, who happens to represent desire and attachment into changes into liberation. Along with the peacock being a symbol in Buddhism, birds as a whole can be seen to be a part of the mantra said during "Wheel of Law", which has "Aum or Om Mani Padme Hung or hum rhi" as the individual symbols. When said together, the translation of the mantra is "Adoration to the jewel in the Lotus Amen". According to Tseten Namgyal. states that the symbols represented as "Om corresponding angels, Mani representing demons, Padme as men, hum as quadrupeds srhi as birds and reptiles".

==== Garuda ====
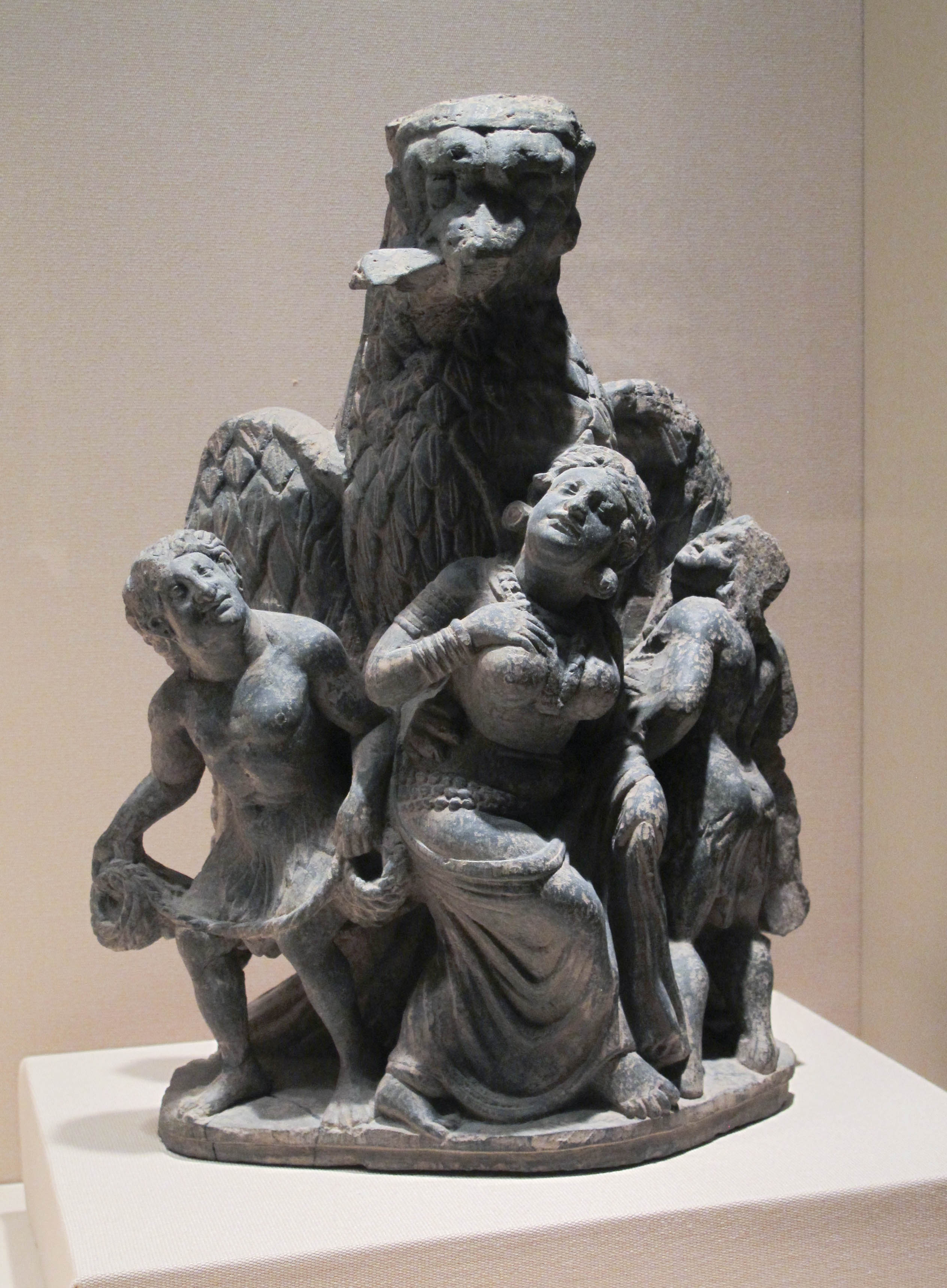
Garuda vanquishing the Naga clan, a Gandhara artwork, second century CE.

Garuda is also known as the king of the birds. When looking at the origins of the name it comes from Gri meaning to swallow since he devours snakes. The way he is represented in iconographies, he can either be seen with the upper body of a human, that has big eyes, a beak, short blue horns, yellow hair standing on the end, a bird's claws and wings. In Hinduism, he can be represented as a human with wings. However, when looking at the symbolism of Garuda, it represents the space element and the power of the sun. Though when looking at the representation from a spiritual view, Garuda represents the spiritual energy that will devour the delusions from jealousy and hatred (represented by snakes). Since he represents the space element, this includes the openness that can be seen when he stretches his wings. Though, when looking at Buddhism specifically, he can represent the dana paramita, when the sun's rays give life to the earth. The deity that Garuda is associated with is Amoghasiddhi, which is the vehicle of the deity. Through this, he is also the vehicle form of Lokishvara Hariharihar vahana. However, he is a deity of his own, who is said to be able to cure the bites of snakes, epilepsy, and diseases caused by nagas. Garuda can be found in toranas which are the semicircular tympanum that stands above the temple doors. Along with an emerald that happens to be named Garuda stone which is said to be protection against poison. Images of the deity are on jewelry as protection against the bites of snakes.

==== Prevention of killing animals in Japan ====
During the early days in Japan, there were some places in the country that would allow the killing of animals in the region. However, Buddhism was transmitted to the country by China via the Korean peninsula. One of the teachings that resonated with the Japanese people was the basic laws of Buddhist ethics that had a part of the laws included the commandment to not kill which was similar to the principle of benevolence or jin, 仁. So from the 7th century onwards, the rulers would prohibit the killing of animals since the animals would be a symbol of benevolent rule for these rulers. What this meant for the animals that were kept by imperial officials included dogs, falcons, and cormorants to name a few who were used for hunting purposes were to be set free. Their offices once used for hunting were abolished later on and the personnel who worked there would be transferred. Though the longevity of these decrees did not last long, the decrees had a long-lasting effect on the norms, values, and behavior of at least the upper class of Japanese society for the next several hundred years.

=== Lotus ===
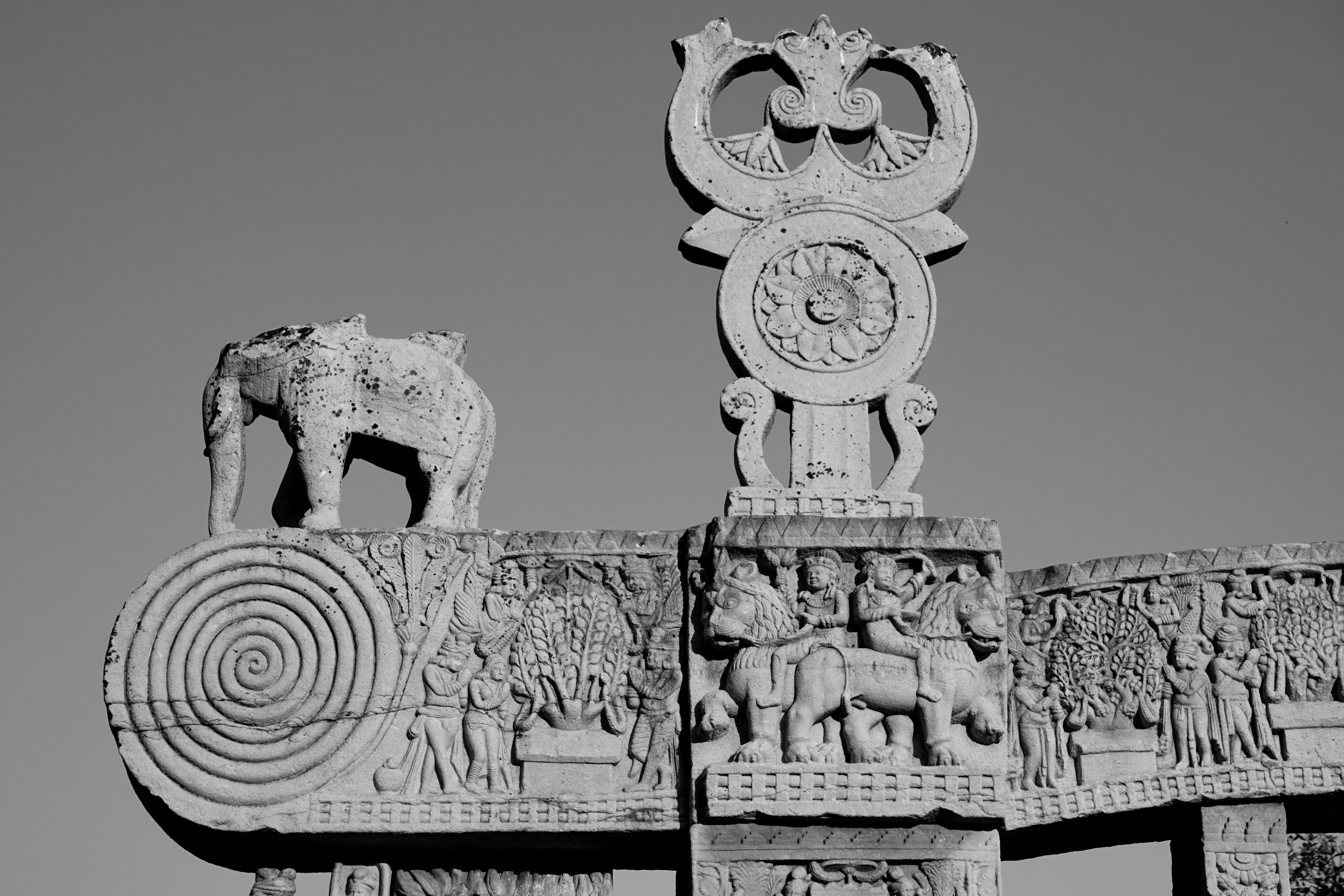
Lotus and triratna at Sanchi

The Indian lotus (Nelumbo nucifera, Sanskrit: padma) is an ancient symbol of purity, detachment and fertility, and it is used in various Indian religions. In Buddhism, the lotus is also another symbol for the Buddha and his awakening. In the Buddhist scriptures, the Buddha compares himself to a lotus (in Pali, paduma). Just like the lotus flower comes up from the muddy water unstained, the Buddha is said to transcend the world without stains. The Indian lotus also appears in early Buddhist sites like Sanchi and Bharhut. It is also the specific symbol of Amitabha, the Buddha of the Lotus family, as well as Avalokiteshvara (i.e. Padmapani, the "lotus holder"). In Tantric Buddhism, it is also symbolic for the vagina as well as for chakras (often visualized as lotuses).

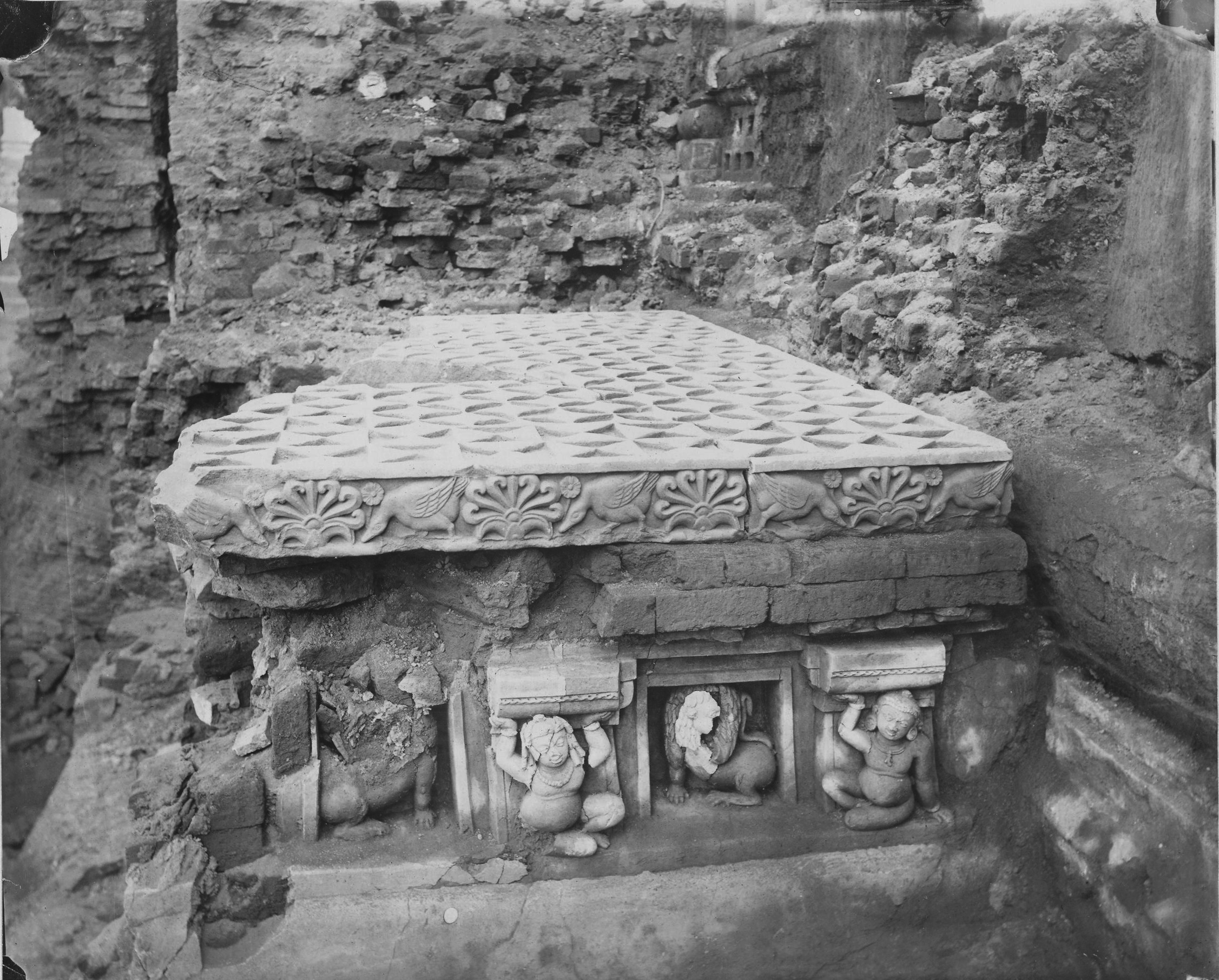
Vajra seat at Bodh Gaya

=== Triratna ===
Another early symbol is the triratna ("three jewels"), also called a trident (trishula) in non-Buddhist contexts. According to Karlsson, the ancient pre-Buddhist symbol was initially seen as a "weapon against enemies or Evil." In Buddhism, this symbol later came to represent the Buddha, Dharma (teaching, eternal law), and sangha (Buddhist monastic community).

=== Vajrasana ===
The Buddha throne, or empty seat/platform (āsana, later associated with the "vajra seat", vajrāsana) is a symbol of the Buddha. The vajra seat or awakening seat represents the place where he sat down (in Bodh Gaya) to meditate and attained awakening. It thus also represents the place of awakening (bodhimanda) and is thus similar to the Bodhi tree in this regard. In early Buddhist art, the vajra seat may also be depicted as an empty seat (often under a tree) or a platform. However, these seats or platforms may not specifically symbolize the "vajra seat" itself and may just be an altar or a symbol of the Buddha. A vajra seat or empty seat may also be decorated with lotuses or be depicted as a giant lotus (in this case, it can be referred to as a "lotus throne").

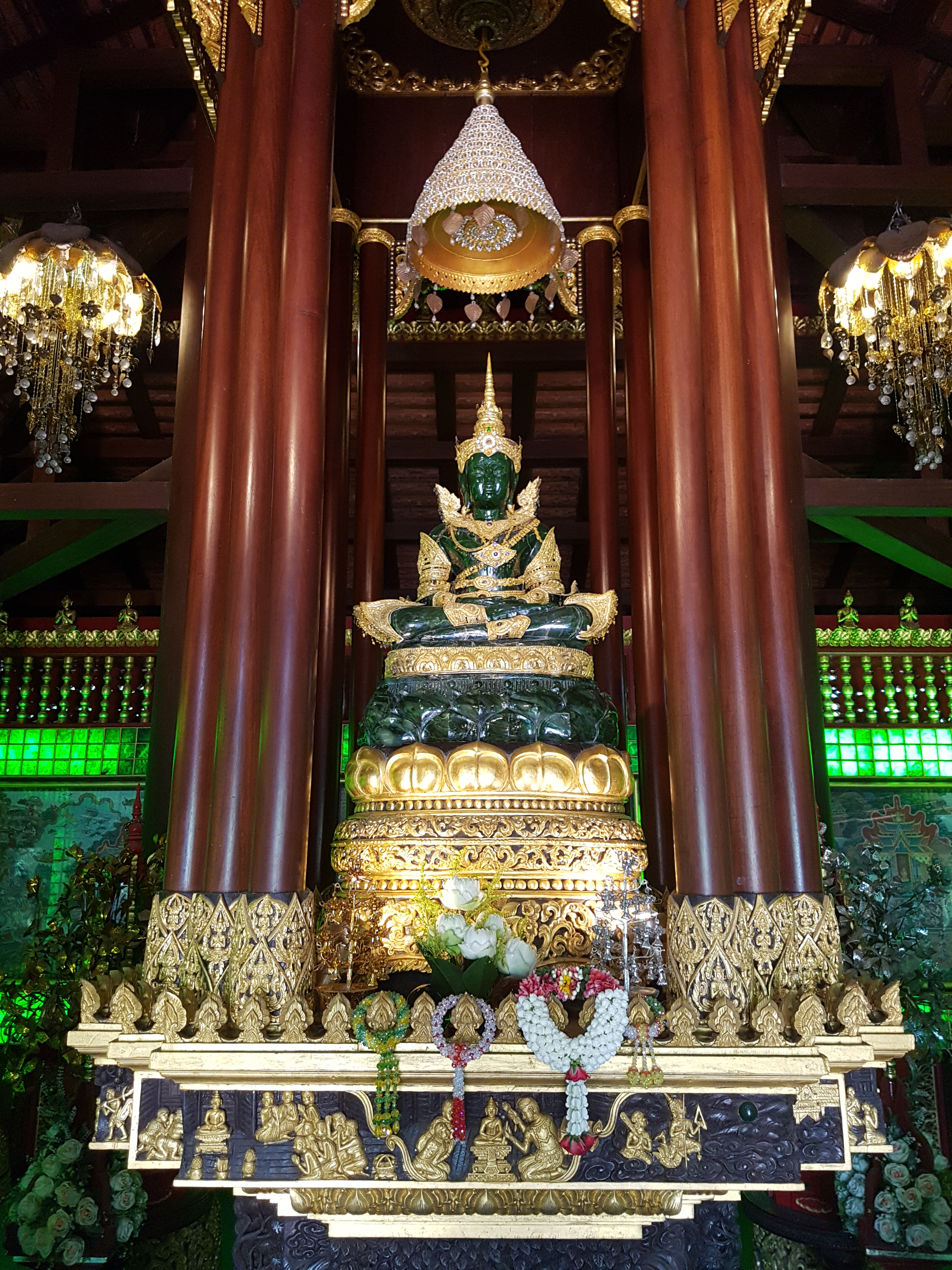
The Emerald Buddha; note the elaborate umbrella (chatra) decorated with Bodhi leaves and the lotus throne

=== Footprints ===
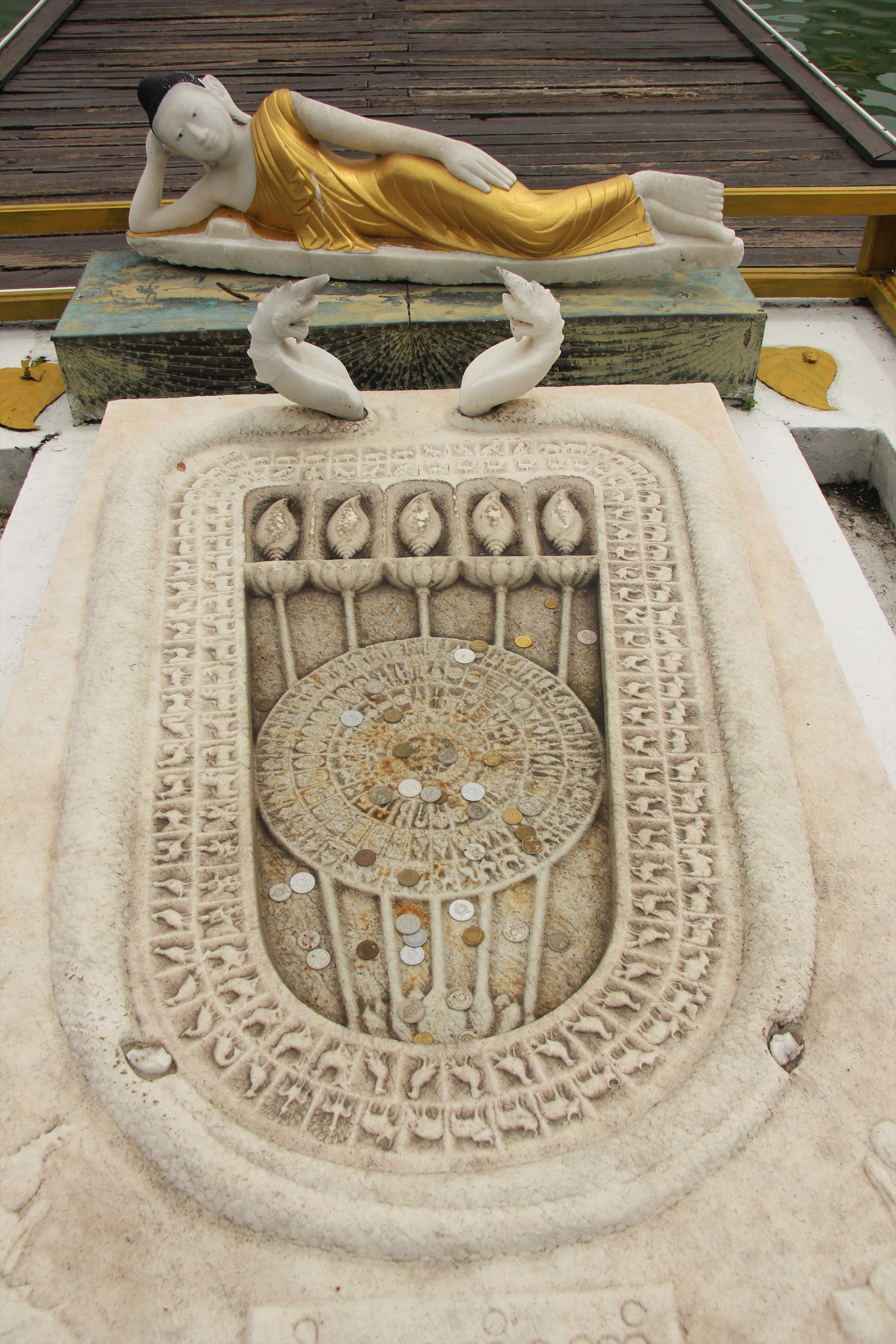
Buddha footprint at the entrance of the Seema Malaka temple, Sri Lanka.

The Buddha footprint (buddhapāda) represents the Buddha. These footprints were often placed on stone slabs, and are usually decorated with some other Buddhist symbol, such as a Dharma wheel, swastika, or triratna, indicating Buddhist identity. According to Karlsson, "in the 3rd century AD as many as twelve signs can be seen on slabs from Nagarjunakonda. At that time we can found such signs as fishes, stupas, pillars, flowers, urns of plenty (purnaghata) and mollusc shells engraved on the buddhapada slab".

=== Chhatra ===
The Buddha as a flaming pillar, Amaravati, Satavahana period

In some early reliefs, the Buddha is represented by a royal umbrella (chatra). Sometimes the chatra is depicted over an empty seat or a horse, and it is sometimes held by an attendant figure like Chandaka. In other depictions, the chatra is shown over an illustration of the Buddha himself. It also represents royalty and protection, as well as honor and respect.

=== Indrakhila ===
The Indrakhila ("Indras post") which appears in early Buddhist sites has sometimes been interpreted as a symbol for the Buddha (but it could just be a symbol of auspiciousness). This is usually "a series of formalized lotus plants one above the other, with artificial brackets in the borders from which hang jewelled garlands and necklaces of lucky talismans betokening both worldly and spiritual riches. At the top there is a trident and at the bottom a pair of footprints".

=== Flaming pillar ===
Another symbol which may indicate the Buddha is a "flaming pillar". This may be a reference to the Twin Miracle at Savatthi and the Buddha's magical abilities.

=== Swastika ===
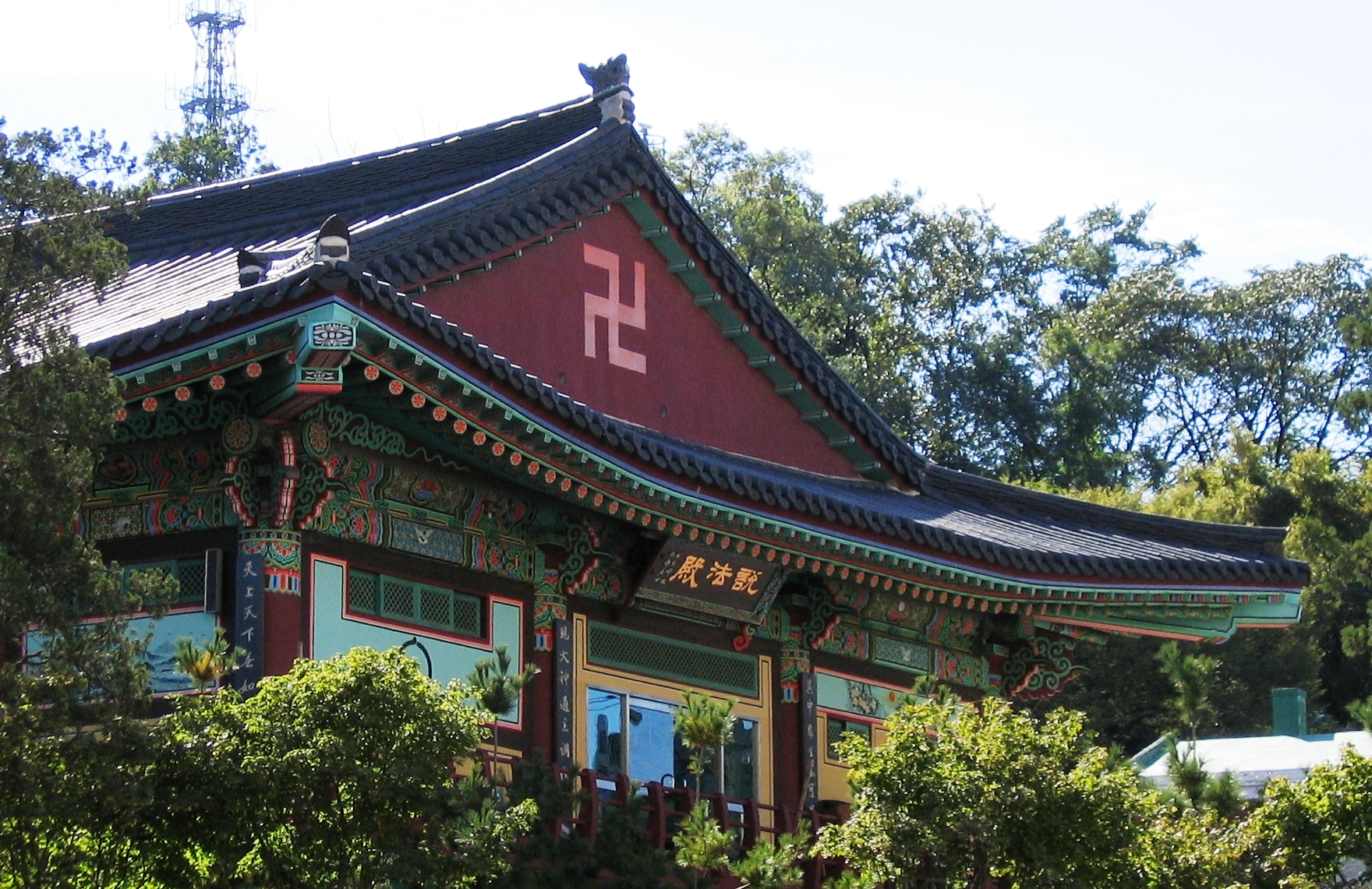
Swastika on a Buddhist temple in Seoul, South Korea

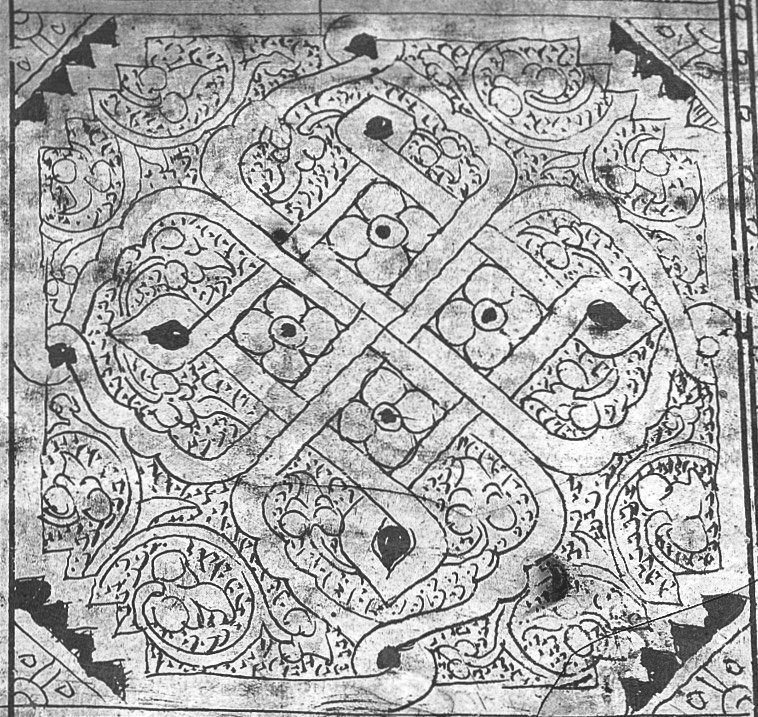
Endless knot in a Burmese Pali Manuscript

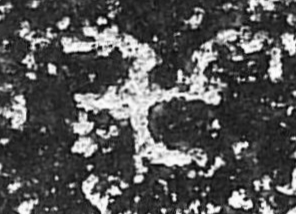
Swastika monogram at the end of Karna Chaupar Cave edict of Emperor Ashoka c.257 BCE

The svastika was traditionally used in India to represent good fortune. This symbol was adopted to symbolize the auspiciousness of the Buddha. The left-facing svastika is often imprinted on the chest, feet or palms of Buddha images. The swastika was also a symbol of protection from evil. The ancient swastika (which are also Chinese characters, mainly 卍 and 卐) is common in Buddhist art. It is widely used in East Asia to represent Buddhism, and Buddhist temples. Buddhist symbols like the swastika have also been used as a family emblem (mon) by Japanese clans.

=== Endless knot ===
The endless knot is a symbol of good luck. It may also represent dependent origination.

It also symbolizes the "endless wisdom and compassion for the Buddha," among other interpretations. The symbols are used in a variety of ways, such as greeting cards, ceremonial scarves, and in jewelry.

=== Pair of fishes ===
A pair of fishes (Sanskrit: matsyayugma) represent happiness and spontaneity as well as fertility and abundance. In Tantric Buddhism, it represents the left and right subtle body channels (nadis). In China, it often represents fidelity and conjugal unity.

=== Dhvaja ===
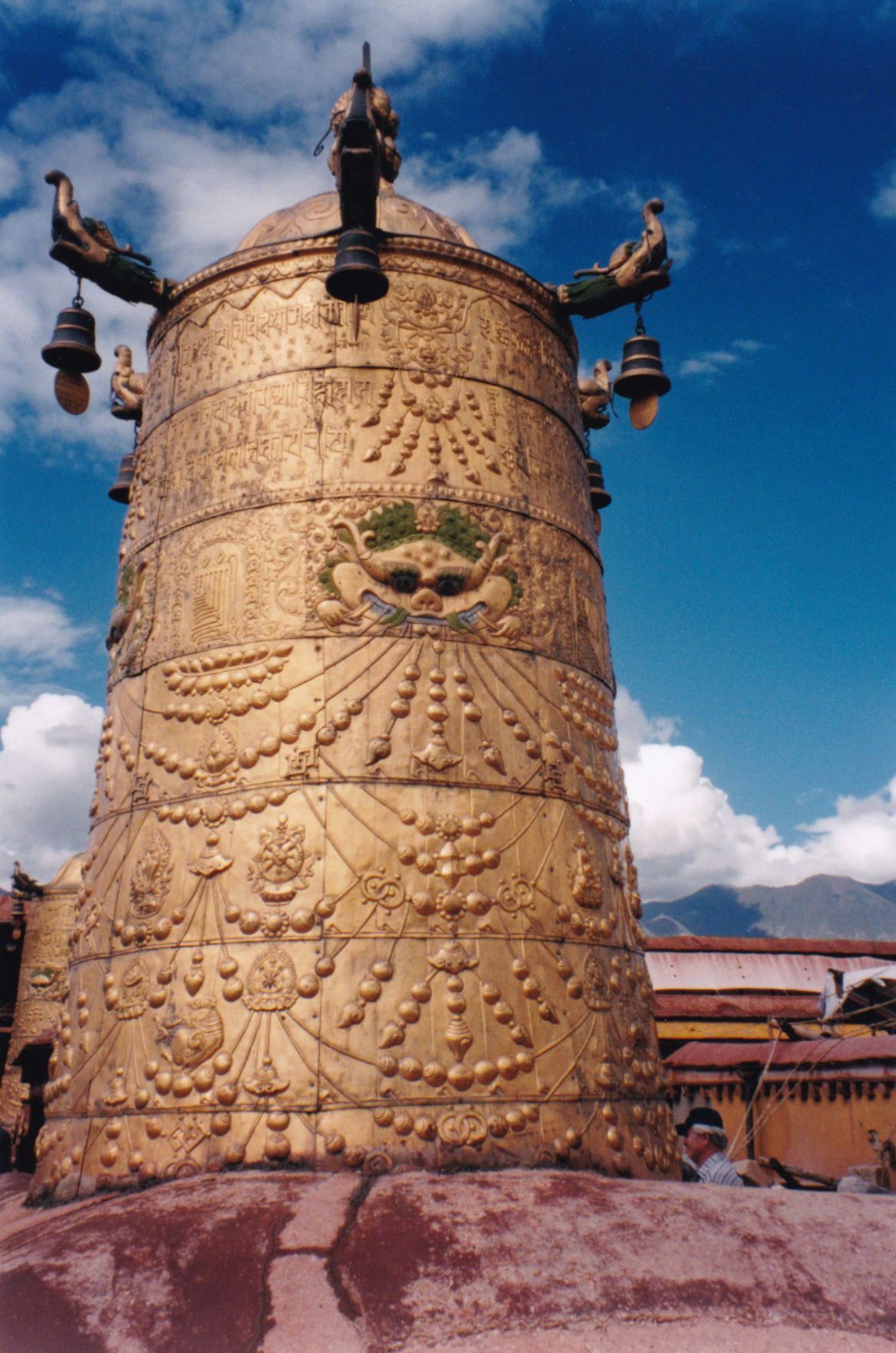
Dhvaja, victory banner

The victory banner was a military symbol of victory, and symbolizes the Buddha's victory over Mara and the defilements (an epithet for the Buddha is the "conqueror"; in Sanskrit, Jina).

=== Vase ===
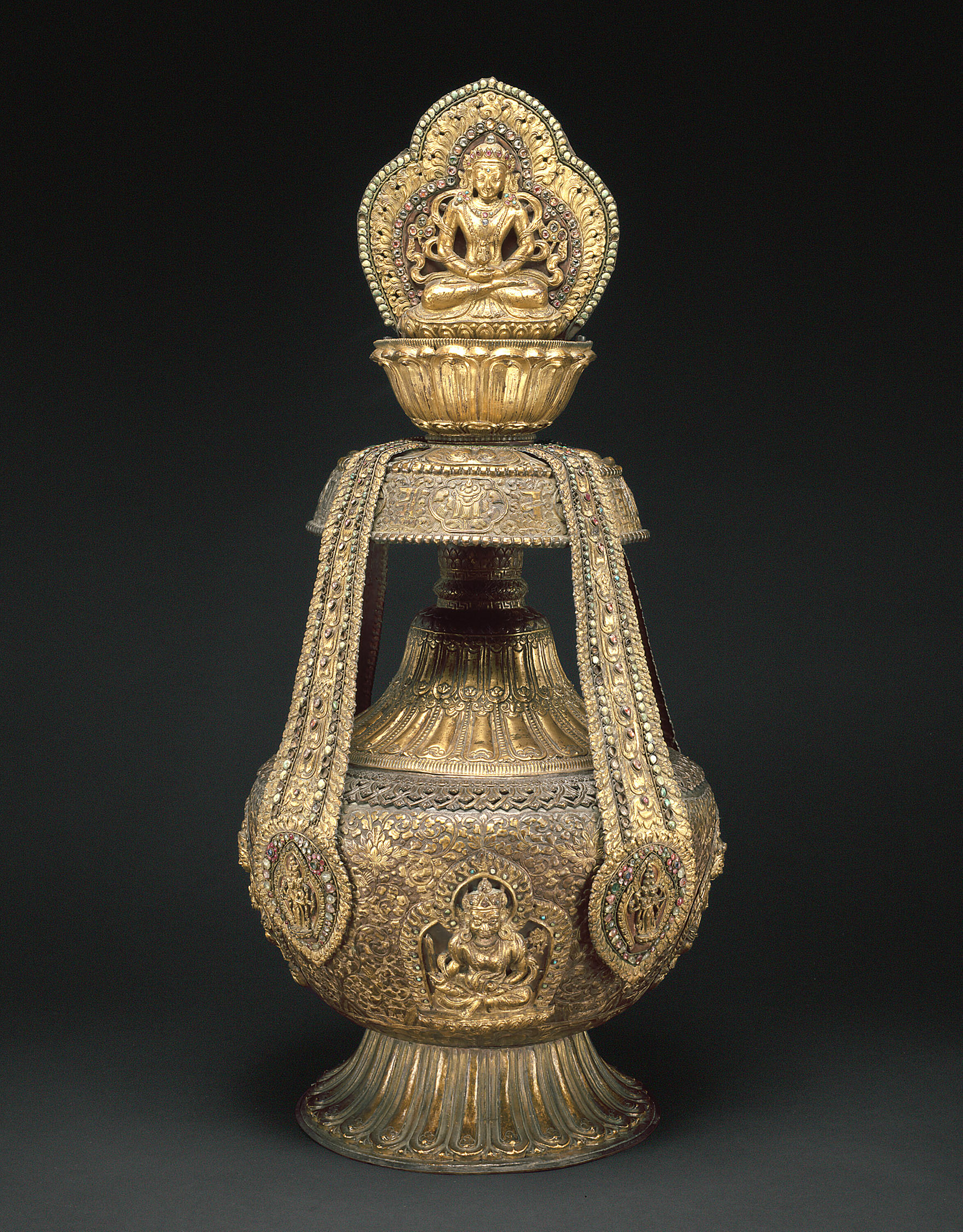
Gilt bumpa with image of Buddha Amitābha. Nepal, 17th century.

A treasure vase, which represents inexhaustible treasure and wealth, is also an attribute of wealth deities like Jambhala, Vaishravana and Vasudhara.

=== Conch shell ===
A conch shell represents victory, the spreading the teachings of the Buddha far and wide, and the aspect of speech. It is blown on auspicious events to announce (and also invite) the deities or other living beings of the happening of the auspicious event, such as marriages (in Sri Lanka).

=== Ever-burning lamp ===
The "ever-burning lamp" (changmingdeng) is "an oil lamp kept in the monastery that in theory was never allowed to burn out". This was used as a symbol for the Buddhist teachings and for the "mind of correct enlightenment" (zhengjuexin).

=== Ruyi ===
Ruyi may have been used as a baton held by a speaker in a conversation (a talking stick), and later became imbued with different Buddhist meanings. The scepters exact usage is unknown, however, is depicted in ancient Chinese artwork commonly as being held by scholars. The artistic style mirrors Buddhist appreciation of natural forms. Ruyi scepters were often given as gifts.

=== Wooden fish ===
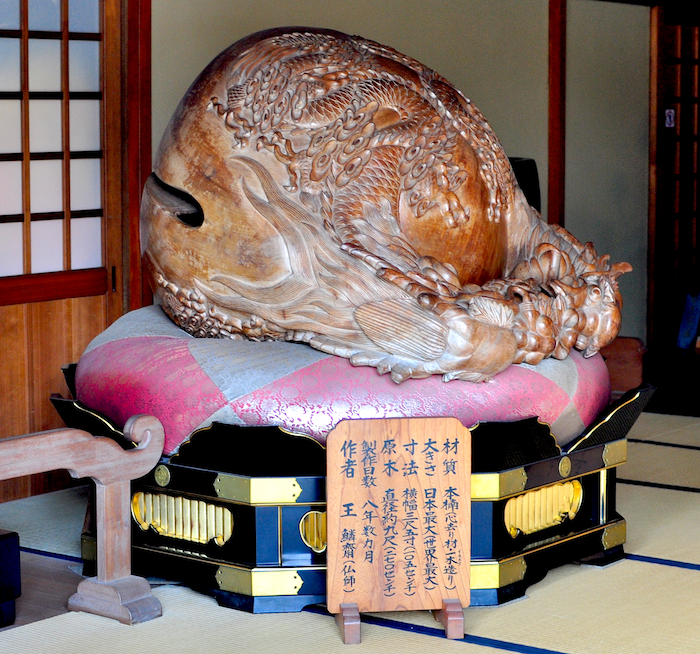
A Japanese "wooden fish" (mokugyo), a wooden percussion instrument used in chanting

Wooden fish symbolized vigilance. In practice is a percussion instrument, known most commonly to the Western World as a Chinese temple block. It is symbolic of wakeful attention, as the eyes of a fish never close. The sound from the drum is believed to call the attention of divinity, and can also be associated with prayers for rain, the act of reincarnation, and wealth. In Buddhist services, the drum is struck persistently whilst the name of Buddha is chanted.

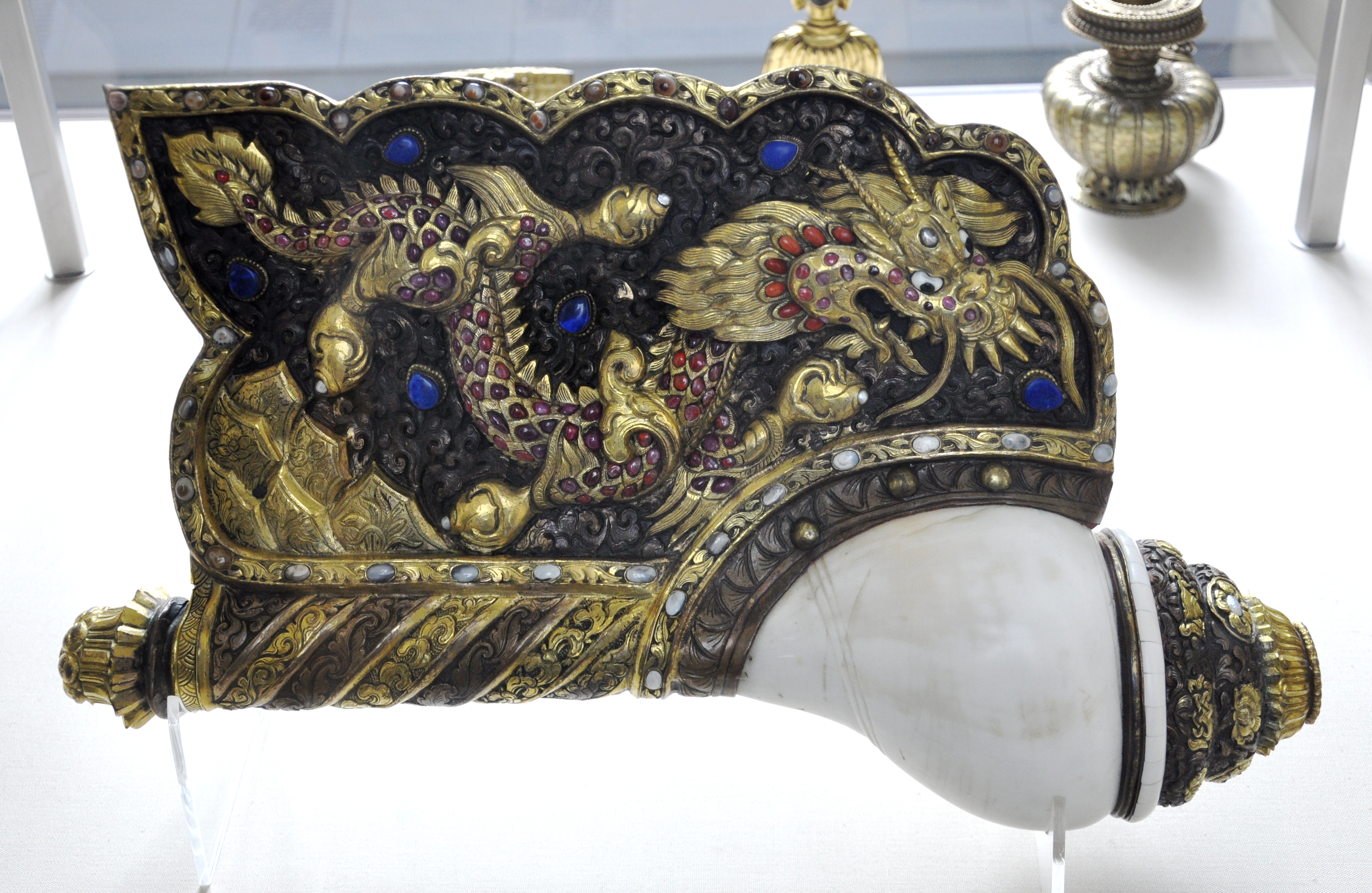
Tibetan ritual conch shell trumpet with dragon

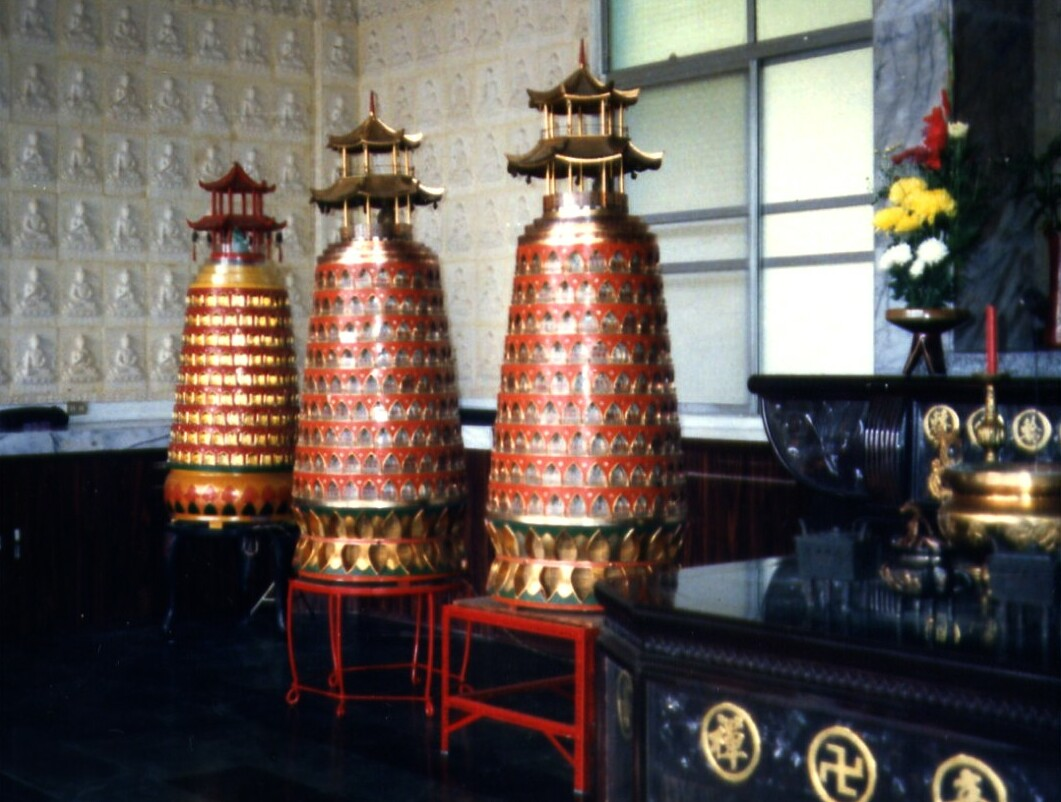
Votive lamps from a Taiwanese temple

=== Ring staff ===
The ring staff is traditionally said to be useful in alerting nearby animals as well as alerting Buddhist donors of the monk's presence (and thus is a symbol of the Buddhist monk).

=== Number 108 ===
The number 108 is very sacred in Buddhism. It represents 108 kleshas of humankind to overcome in order to achieve enlightenment. In Japan, at the end of the year, a bell is chimed 108 times in Buddhist temples to finish the old year and welcome the new one. Each ring represents one of 108 earthly temptations (Bonnō) a person must overcome to achieve nirvana.

=== Vajra ===
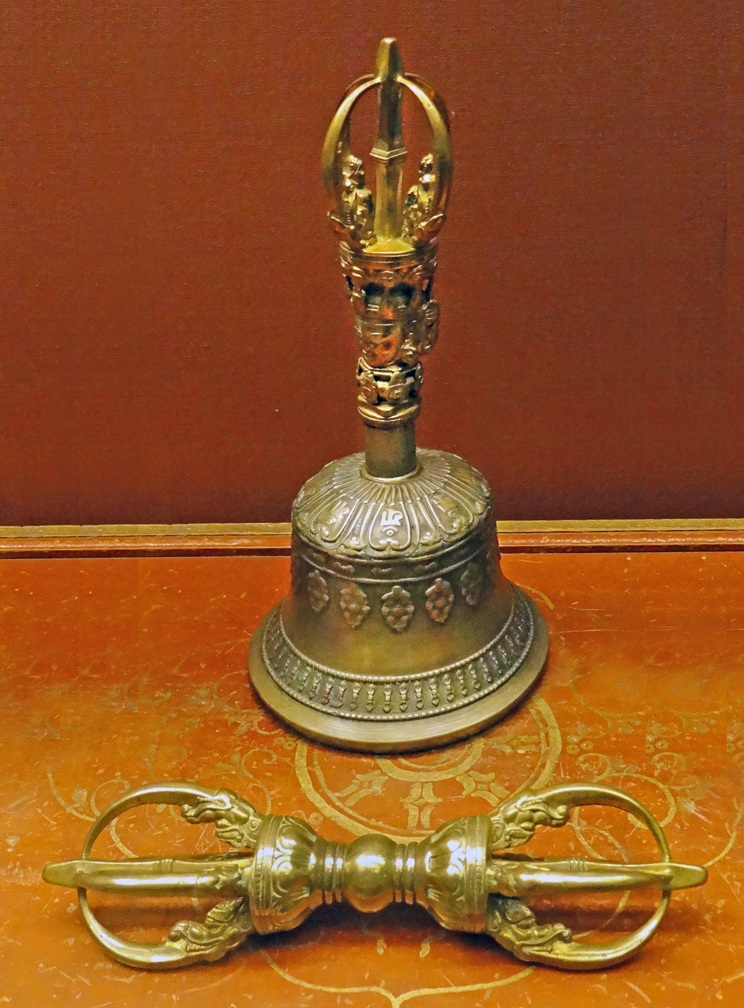
Ritual bell and vajra

A vajra is a ritual weapon symbolizing the properties of a diamond (indestructibility) and a thunderbolt (irresistible force). The vajra is a male polysemic symbol that represents many things for the tantrika. The vajra is representative of upaya (skilful means) whereas its companion tool, the bell which is a female symbol, denotes prajna (wisdom). Some deities are shown holding each the vajra and bell in separate hands, symbolizing the union of the forces of compassion and wisdom, respectively.

In the tantric traditions of Buddhism, the vajra is a symbol for the nature of reality, or sunyata, indicating endless creativity, potency, and skillful activity.

An instrument symbolizing vajra is also extensively used in the rituals of the tantra. It consists of a spherical central section, with two symmetrical sets of five prongs, which arc out from lotus blooms on either side of the sphere and come to a point at two points equidistant from the centre, thus giving it the appearance of a "diamond sceptre", which is how the term is sometimes translated.

Various figures in Tantric iconography are represented holding or wielding the vajra.

The vajra is made up of several parts. In the center is a sphere which represents Sunyata, the primordial nature of the universe, the underlying unity of all things. Emerging from the sphere are two eight petaled lotus flowers. One represents the phenomenal world (or in Buddhist terms Samsara), the other represents the noumenal world (Nirvana). This is one of the fundamental dichotomies which are perceived by the unenlightened.

Arranged equally around the mouth of the lotus are two, four, or eight creatures which are called makara. These are mythological half-fish, half-crocodile creatures made up of two or more animals, often representing the union of opposites (or a harmonisation of qualities that transcend our usual experience). From the mouths of the makara come tongues which come together in a point.

The five-pronged vajra (with four makara, plus a central prong) is the most commonly seen vajra. There is an elaborate system of correspondences between the five elements of the noumenal side of the vajra, and the phenomenal side. One important correspondence is between the five "poisons" with the five wisdoms. The five poisons are the mental states that obscure the original purity of a being's mind, while the five wisdoms are the five most important aspects of the enlightened mind. Each of the five wisdoms is also associated with a Buddha figure (see also Five Wisdom Buddhas).

=== Bell ===
The vajra is almost always paired with a ritual bell. Tibetan term for a ritual bell used in Buddhist religious practices is tribu. Priests and devotees ring bells during the rituals. Together these ritual implements represent the inseparability of wisdom and compassion in the enlightened mindstream. During meditation ringing the bell represents the sound of Buddha teaching the dharma and symbolizes the attainment of wisdom and the understanding of emptiness. During the chanting of the mantras the Bell and Vajra are used together in a variety of different ritualistic ways to represent the union of the male and female principles.

The hollow of the bell represents the void from which all phenomena arise, including the sound of the bell, and the clapper represents form. Together they symbolize wisdom (emptiness) and compassion (form or appearance). The sound, like all phenomena, arises, radiates forth and then dissolves back into emptiness.

=== Enso ===
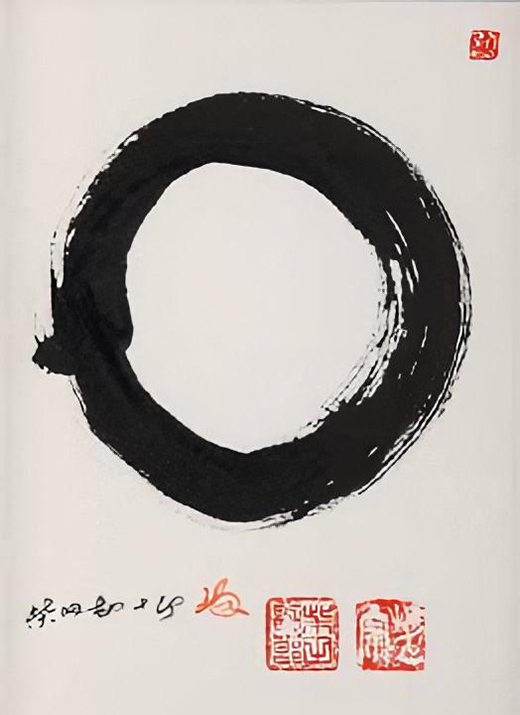
Ensō Calligraphy by Kanjuro Shibata XX

In Zen, ensō (円相, "circular form") is a circle that is hand-drawn in one or two uninhibited brushstrokes to express a moment when the mind is free to let the body create. The ensō symbolizes absolute enlightenment, strength, elegance, the universe, and mu (the void). It is characterised by a minimalism born of Japanese aesthetics. The circle may be open or closed. In the former case, the circle is incomplete, allowing for movement and development as well as the perfection of all things. Zen practitioners relate the idea to wabi-sabi, the beauty of imperfection. When the circle is closed, it represents perfection, akin to Plato's perfect form, the reason why the circle was used for centuries in the construction of cosmological models Once the ensō is drawn, one does not change it. It evidences the character of its creator and the context of its creation in a brief, continuous period of time. Ensō exemplifies the various dimensions of the Japanese wabi-sabi perspective and aesthetic: fukinsei (asymmetry, irregularity), kanso (simplicity), koko (basic; weathered), shizen (without pretense; natural), yugen (subtly profound grace), datsuzoku (freedom), and seijaku (tranquility).

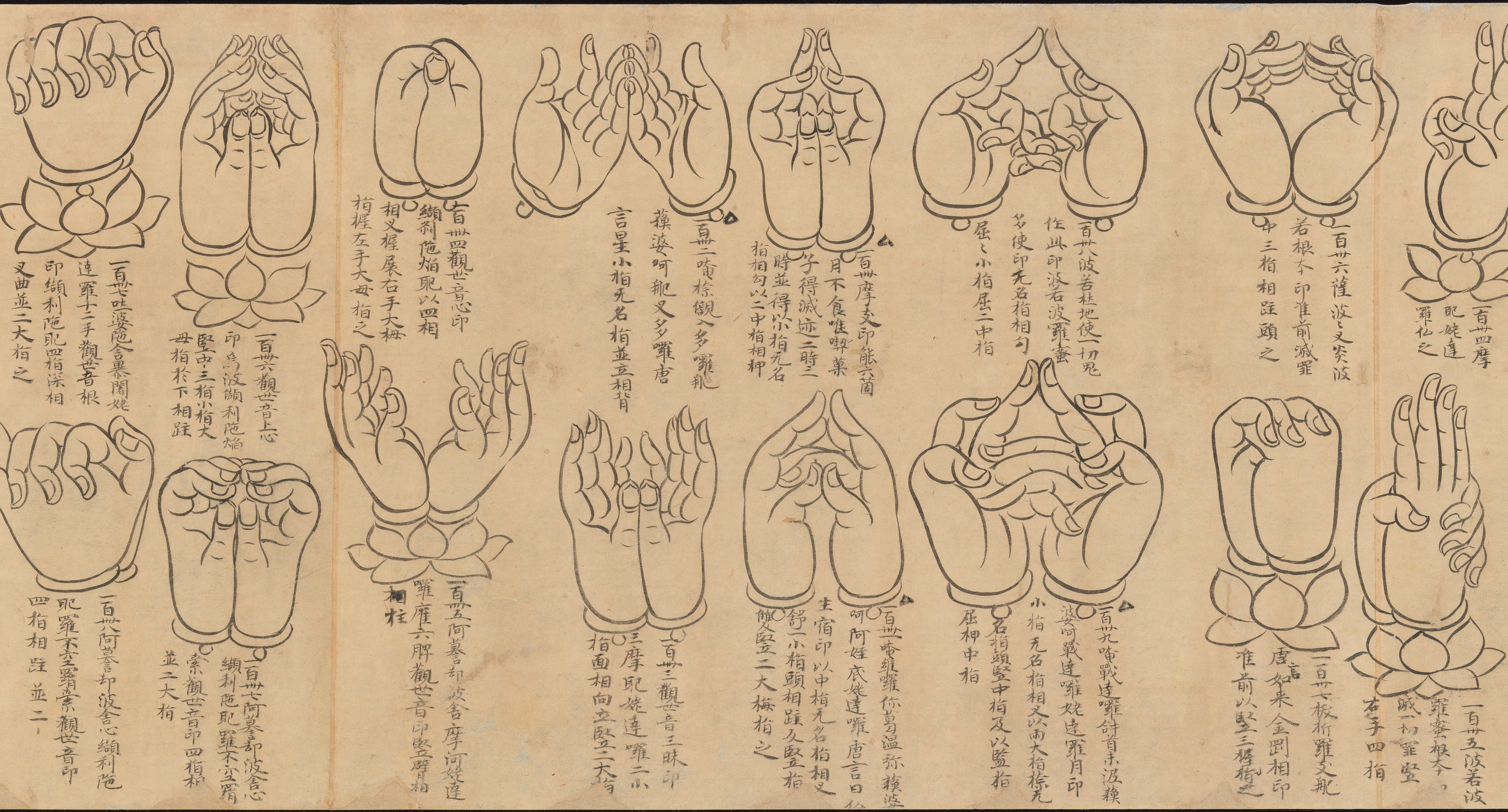
Japanese scroll depicting various mudras

=== Mudras ===
Mudras are a series of symbolic hand gestures in Buddhist art. There are numerous mudras with different meanings. Mudras are used to represent specific moments in the life of Gautama Buddha.

=== Other symbols ===
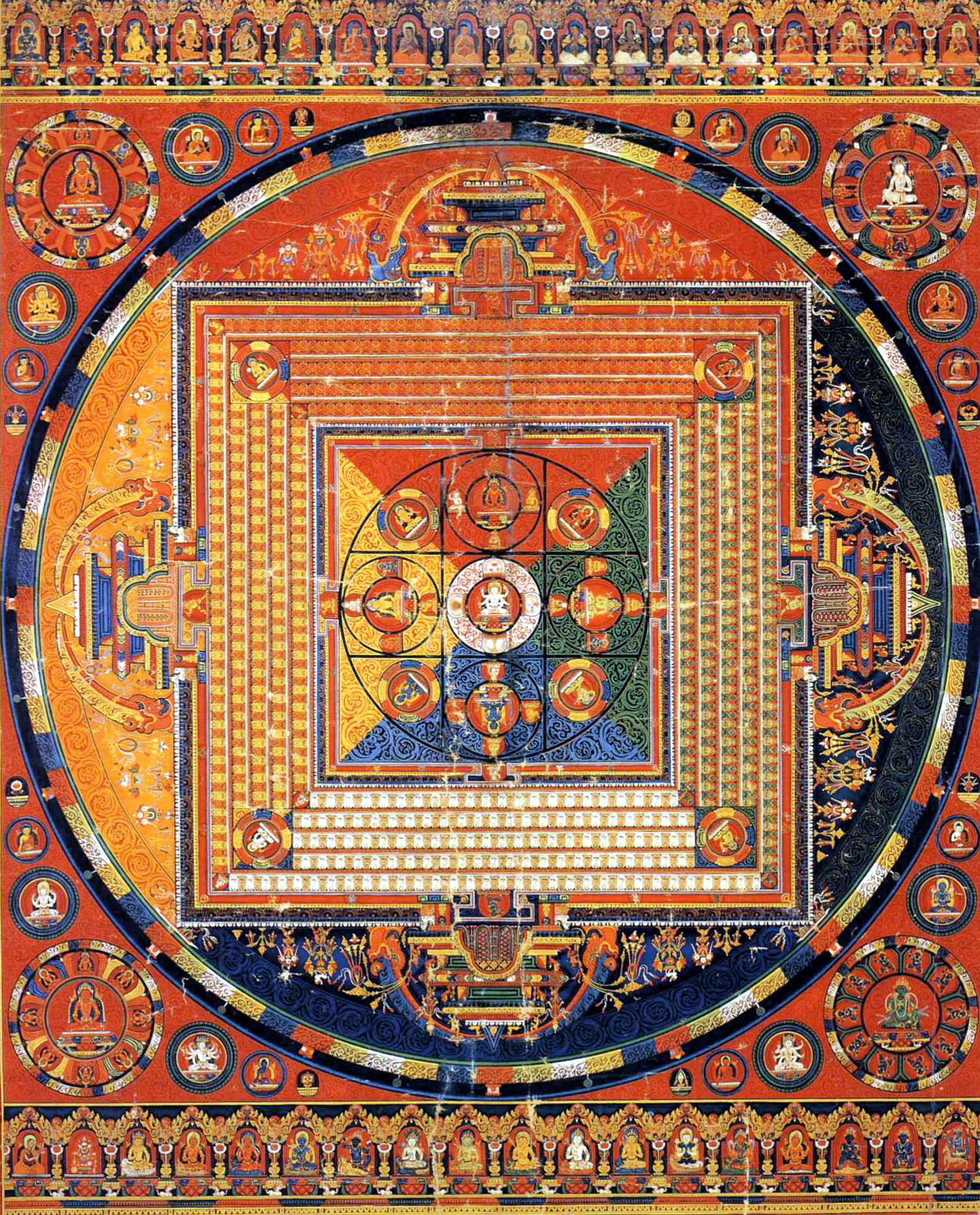
Mandala of Vajradhatu (the vajra realm)

- Some deities such as Prajñaparamita and Manjushri are depicted as holding a flaming sword, symbolizing the power of wisdom (prajña).
- The gankyil or "wheel of joy" symbol, which can symbolize different sets of three ideas.
- Various kinds of jewels (mani, ratna), such as the cintamani or "wish fulfilling jewel".
- Buddhist prayer beads (mala), which originated in India as a way to count prayers or mantras and commonly have 108 beads.
- The wish fulfilling tree (kalpavriksha)
- The fly-whisk, which is a tool to drive away insects and thus symbolizes non-harming (ahimsa).
- Yantra.

== Groups ==
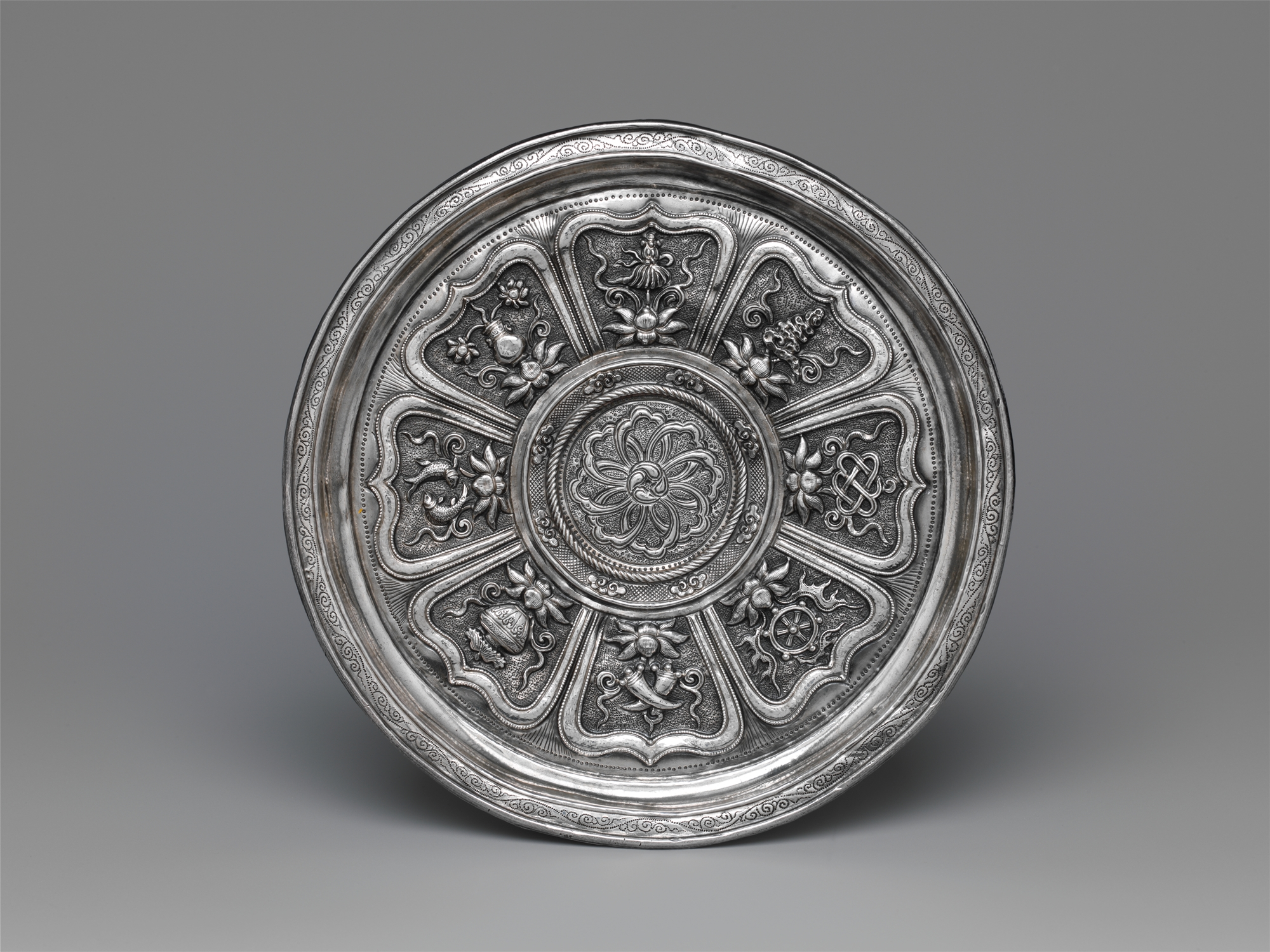
A Chinese Metal Cup stand with the eight auspicious symbols (14th century)

=== The eight auspicious signs ===
Mahayana Buddhist art makes use of a common set of Indian "eight auspicious symbols" (Sanskrit aṣṭamaṅgala, Chinese: 八吉祥; pinyin: Bā jíxiáng, Tib. bkra-shis rtags-brgyad). These symbols were pre-Buddhist Indian symbols which were associated with kingship and may originally have included other symbols, like the swastika, the srivasta, a throne, a drum and a fly wisk (this is still part of the Newari Buddhist eight symbol list).

The most common set of "Eight Auspicious Symbols" (used in Tibetan and East Asian Buddhism) are:

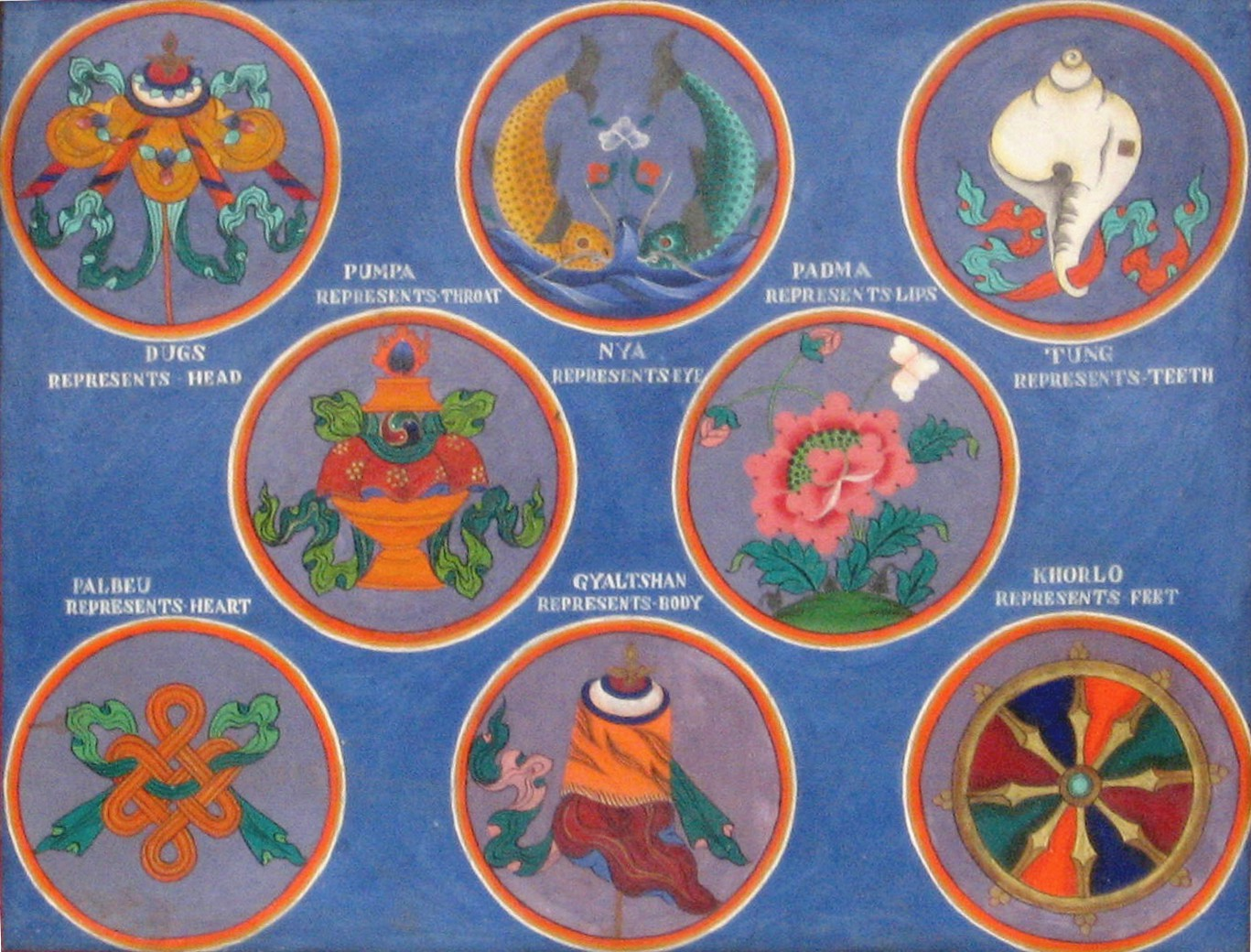
Tibetan style aṣṭamaṅgala symbols

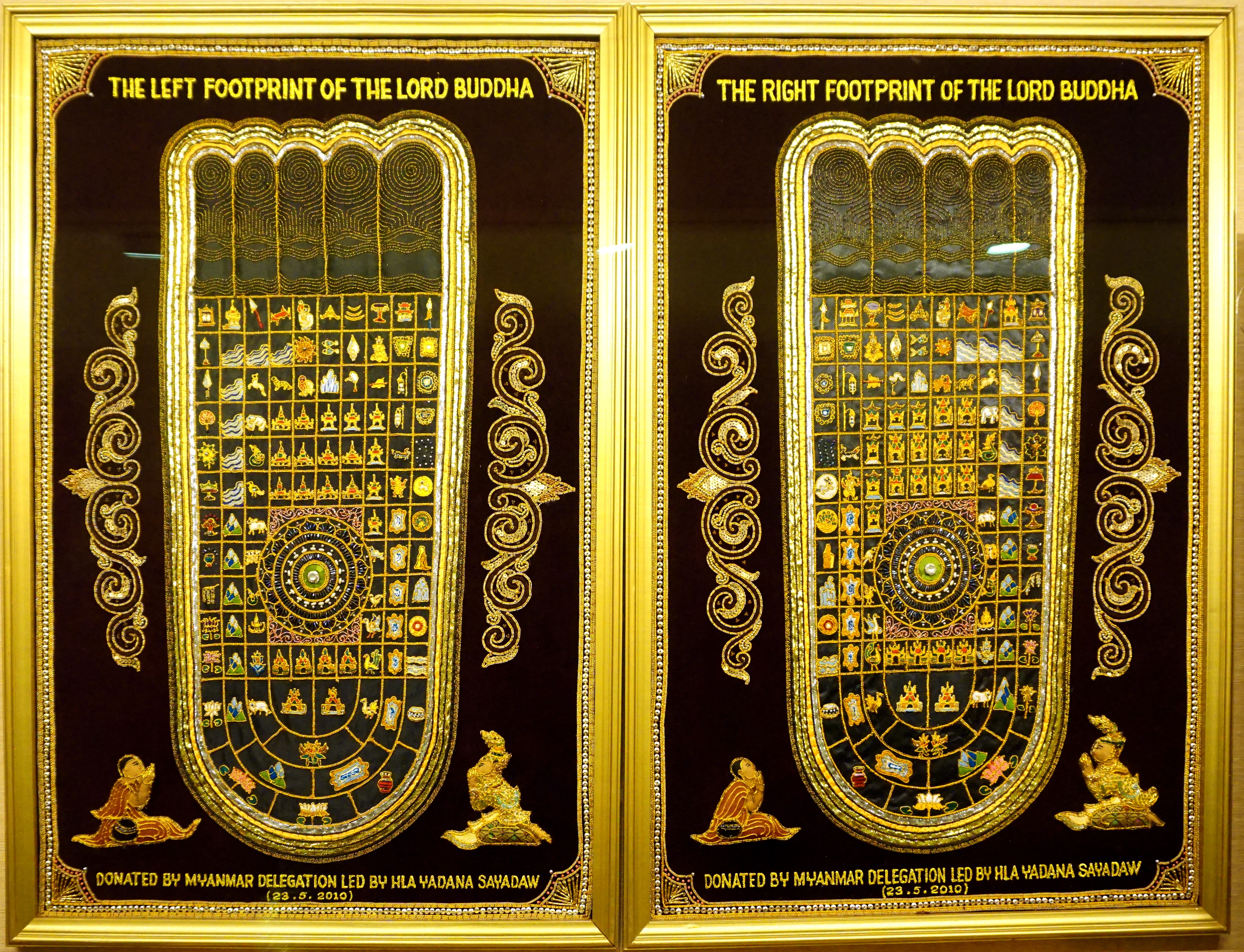
Burmese Buddha feet

1. Lotus flower (Skt. padma; Pali. Paduma)
2. Endless knot (srivasta, granthi) or "curl of happiness" (nandyavarta)
3. Pair of golden fish (Skt. matsyayugma)
4. Victory banner (Skt. dhvaja; Pali. dhaja)
5. Dharma wheel (Skt. Dharmacakra Pali. Dhammacakka)
6. Treasure vase (kumbha)
7. Jeweled Parasol (Skt. chatra; Pali. Chatta)
8. White Conch Shell (sankha)

=== Symbols on Feet of Buddha ===
Buddha footprints often bear distinguishing marks, such as a Dharmachakra at the centre of the sole, or the group of 32, 108 or 132 auspicious signs of the Buddha, engraved or painted on the sole.

== See also ==
- Buddhist art
- Chinese art
- Indian art
- Japanese art
- Korean art
- Religious symbolism
- Tibetan art

== Bibliography ==
- Anderson, Carol (2013-10-11). Pain and Its Ending. Routledge. doi:10.4324/9781315027401. ISBN 9781136813252.
- Beer, Robert (2003). The Handbook of Tibetan Buddhist Symbols. Serindia Publications. ISBN 978-1-932476-03-3.
- Coomaraswamy, Ananda K. (1998). Elements of Buddhist Iconography. Munshiram Manoharlal Publishers.
- Chauley, G. C. (1998). Early Buddhist Art in India: 300 B.C. to 300 A.D. Sundeep Prakashan
- Kapstein, Matthew T. (June 2004). "Tadeusz Skorupski: The Buddhist Forum, Volume VI. ix, 269 pp. Tring: The Institute of Buddhist Studies, 2001". Bulletin of the School of Oriental and African Studies. 67 (2): 266. doi:10.1017/s0041977x04420163. ISSN 0041-977X. S2CID 162316190.
- Karlsson, Klemens (2000). Face to Face With the Absent Buddha - The Formation of Buddhist Aniconic Art. Uppsala University.Lokesh, C., & International Academy of Indian Culture. (1999). Dictionary of Buddhist iconography. New Delhi: International Academy of Indian Culture.
- Seckel, Dietrich; Leisinger, Andreas (2004). Before and beyond the Image: Aniconic Symbolism in Buddhist Art, Artibus Asiae, Supplementum 45, 3–107
- Xing, Guang (2004-11-10). The Concept of the Buddha. Routledge. doi:10.4324/9780203413104. ISBN 9781134317004.
- Kieschnick, John (2020). The Impact of Buddhism on Chinese Material Culture. Princeton University Press.
