= Savitri Bai Phule =

Indian politician

Member of Parliament, Lok Sabha
- In office 16 May 2014 – 23 May 2019
- Preceded by: Kamal Kishor
- Succeeded by: Akshaibar Lal
- Constituency: Bahraich

Member of the uttar Pradesh Legislative Assembly
- In office 6 March 2012 – 16 May 2014
- Constituency: Balha

Personal details
- Born: 1 June 1981 (age 45) Nanpara, Uttar Pradesh, India
- Party: Kanshiram Bahujan Samaj Party
- Other political affiliations: Indian National Congress (2019-2021); Bharatiya Janata Party (2014-2019)
- Education: Dr. Ram Manohar Lohia Avadh University
- Occupation: Social Worker
- As of 17 December, 2016

Savitri Bai Phule (born 1 January 1981) is an Indian politician and president of the Kanshiram Bahujan Samaj Party (KBSP). She was elected to the state assembly in 2012 from Balha in Bahraich district as a candidate of Bharatiya Janata Party. She contested 2014 Lok Sabha election from Bahraich and became member of 16th Lok Sabha.

On 7 September 2015, Phule filed a complaint against Dilip Buildcon Limited company over caste remarks and threatening her with dire consequences.

== Personal life ==
Savitribai was born on 1 January 1981 in a Buddhist family at Nanpara in Bahraich district, Uttar Pradesh. She studied at Dr. Ram Manohar Lohia Avadh University. She is influenced by Babasaheb Ambedkar and The Buddha. She follows Buddhism and wears saffron cloths as a symbol of Buddhism.

== Political career ==
She was elected to the state assembly in 2012 from Balha in Bahraich district as a candidate of Bharatiya Janata Party. She contested 2014 Lok Sabha election from Bahraich and became member of 16th Lok Sabha.

She quit BJP on 6 December 2018 stating "Party Trying To Divide Society", Her action comes after the Uttar Pradesh Chief Minister Yogi Adityanath's comment on Hanuman’s caste and joined Indian National Congress on 2 March 2019. She contested 2019 general elections from Bahraich parliamentary constituency as an Indian National Congress candidate. She got 34454 votes and lost the seat to Akshaibar Lal of Bhartiya Janta Party.

In January 2020, Phule founded Kanshiram Bahujan Samaj Party (KBSP).
