= Bahraich Assembly constituency =

Constituency of the Uttar Pradesh legislative assembly in India

Coordinates: 27.58°N 81.60°E

Bahraich
- Constituency No. 286 for the Uttar Pradesh Legislative Assembly

Constituency details
- Country: India
- Region: North India
- State: Uttar Pradesh
- District: Bahraich
- Lok Sabha constituency: Bahraich
- Reservation: None

Member of Legislative Assembly
- 18th Uttar Pradesh Legislative Assembly
- Incumbent Anupama Jaiswal
- Party: Bharatiya Janata Party
- Elected year: 2022
- Preceded by: Waqar Ahmad Shah

Bahraich is a constituency of the Uttar Pradesh Legislative Assembly covering the city of Bahraich in the Bahraich district of Uttar Pradesh, India. Bahraich is one of five assembly constituencies in the Bahraich Lok Sabha constituency. Since 2008, this assembly constituency is numbered 286 amongst 403 constituencies.

Currently this seat belongs to Bharatiya Janta Party candidate Anupama Jaiswal who won in last Assembly election of 2017 Uttar Pradesh Legislative Elections defeating Samajwadi Party candidate Rubab Sayda by a margin of 6,702 votes.

== Members of the Legislative Assembly ==
#	Term	Name	Party	From	To	Days	Comments	Ref
01	01st Vidhan Sabha	Raj Kishore	Indian National Congress	20 May 1952	31 March 1957	1,776	Bahraich East	
01	01st Vidhan Sabha	Triloki Nath Kaul	Indian National Congress	20 May 1952	31 March 1957	1,776	Bahraich West	
02	02nd Vidhan Sabha	Zargham Haider	Praja Socialist Party	1 April 1957	6 March 1962	1,800	Bahraich North	
02	02nd Vidhan Sabha	Birendra Bikram Singh	Independent	1 April 1957	6 March 1962	1,800	Bahraich South	
03	03rd Vidhan Sabha	Jadish Prasad	Indian National Congress	7 March 1962	9 March 1967	1,828	Bahraich North	
03	03rd Vidhan Sabha	Daljit Singh	Indian National Congress	7 March 1962	9 March 1967	1,828	Bahraich South	
04	04th Vidhan Sabha	K. B. Misra	Bharatiya Jana Sangh	10 March 1967	15 April 1968	402	Bahraich	
05	05th Vidhan Sabha	Kedar Nath Agarwal	Indian National Congress	26 February 1969	4 March 1974	1,832	Bahraich	
06	06th Vidhan Sabha	Kedar Nath Agarwal	Indian National Congress	4 March 1974	30 April 1977	1,153	Bahraich	
07	07th Vidhan Sabha	Mohammad Atif Khan	Janata Party	23 June 1977	17 February 1980	969	Bahraich	
08	08th Vidhan Sabha	Dharam Pal	Bharatiya Janata Party	9 Jun 1980	10 March 1985	1,735	Bahraich	
09	09th Vidhan Sabha	Maharan Nath Kaul	Indian National Congress	10 March 1985	29 November 1989	1,725	Bahraich	
10	10th Vidhan Sabha	Dharam Pal	Indian National Congress	2 December 1989	4 April 1991	488	Bahraich	
11	11th Vidhan Sabha	Brij Raj Tripathi	Bharatiya Janata Party	22 June 1991	6 December 1992	533	Bahraich	
12	12th Vidhan Sabha	Waqar Ahmad Shah	Samajwadi Party	4 December 1993	28 October 1995	693	Bahraich	
13	13th Vidhan Sabha	Waqar Ahmad Shah	Samajwadi Party	17 October 1996	7 March 2002	1,967	Bahraich	
14	14th Vidhan Sabha	Waqar Ahmad Shah	Samajwadi Party	26 February 2002	13 May 2007	1,902	Bahraich	
15	15th Vidhan Sabha	Waqar Ahmad Shah	Samajwadi Party	13 May 2007	9 March 2012	1,762	Bahraich	
16	16th Vidhan Sabha	Waqar Ahmad Shah	Samajwadi Party	8 March 2012	11 March 2017	1,829	Bahraich	
17	17th Vidhan Sabha	Anupama Jaiswal	Bharatiya Janata Party	14 March 2017	11 March 2017	1,823	Bahraich	
18	18th Vidhan Sabha	Anupama Jaiswal	Bharatiya Janata Party	March 2022	Incumbent	-	Bahraich	

== Election results ==
=== 2027 ===
2027 Uttar Pradesh Legislative Assembly election: Baharaich
Party	Candidate	Votes	%	±%
INDIA				
NDA				
BSP				
NOTA	None of the above			
Majority				
Turnout				
gain from		Swing		

=== 2022 ===
2022 Uttar Pradesh Legislative Assembly election: Bahraich
Party	Candidate	Votes	%	±%
BJP	Anupama Jaiswal	107,628	46.45	▲5.45
SP	Yasar Shah	103,550	44.69	▲6.83
BSP	Naeem	10,299	4.44	▼12.58
INC	Jai Prakash Mishra	3,275	1.41	
AIMIM	Rashid Jamil	2,240	0.97	
NOTA	None of the above	2,076	0.9	▼0.34
Majority		4,078	1.76	▼1.38
Turnout		231,708	59.14	▼0.62
BJP hold		Swing		

=== 2017 ===
2017 Uttar Pradesh Legislative Assembly election: Bahraich
Party	Candidate	Votes	%	±%
BJP	Anupama Jaiswal	87,479	41.0	
SP	Rubab Sayda	80,777	37.86	
BSP	Ajeet Pratap Singh	36,325	17.02	
NOTA	None of the above	2,604	1.24	
Majority		6,702	3.14	
Turnout		213,375	59.76	
BJP gain from SP		Swing		

=== 2012 ===
Waqar Ahmad Shah has won the seat five times.

2012 Uttar Pradesh Legislative Assembly election: Bahraich
Party	Candidate	Votes	%	±%
SP	Waqar Ahmad Shah	50,759	29.5102	
INC	Chandra Shekhar Singh	35263	20.5%	
