= Junaid Ahmad Noor =

Indian Urdu writer and researcher (born 1992)

- Born: Junaid Ahmad Zargar; 2 January 1992 (age 34); Bahraich, Uttar Pradesh, India
- Occupations: Writer, researcher, trader
- Writing career
- Language: Urdu
- Notable works: Bahraich Ek Tārīkhi Shahr (2 vols), Khanqah-e-Nayeemia Bahraich

Junaid Ahmad Noor (born 2 January 1992), also spelled as Juned Ahmad Noor, is an Indian Urdu writer and researcher from Bahraich, Uttar Pradesh. He has written on the cultural, religious, and literary history of Bahraich, including the two-volume Bahraich Ek Tārīkhi Shahr and Khanqah-e-Nayeemia Bahraich: Tarīkh ke Aurāq se Aaj tak.

== Biography ==
Junaid Ahmad Noor was born in Bahraich, Uttar Pradesh, on 2 January 1992. He studied at local institutions and later pursued further education through IGNOU.

In October 2021, he was elected senior vice-president of Urdu Mahfil, a literary association in Bahraich.

In March 2025, amid public debate over the Jeth Fair at the shrine of Ghazi Saiyyad Salar Masud, Noor was quoted in the Hindustan Times as saying that Masud was born in Ajmer in 1015 CE and died in Bahraich in 1034 CE. He added that the saint is locally known as "Baale Miyan" and that carrying flags to his shrine has been a longstanding practice.

== Works ==
Noor authored the two-volume series Bahraich Ek Tārīkhi Shahr. The first volume, published in 2019, documents the history of Bahraich with accounts of religious figures, scholars and political leaders. The second volume, Bahraich Urdu Adab Mein (2021), focuses on the region’s Urdu literary tradition and was launched in Bahraich in March 2022.

The series received reviews in Urdu literary circles. In the daily Aag (Lucknow), Waseem Ahmad Azmi wrote that the second volume places Bahraich in a wider literary and historical context, while University of Lucknow scholar Sufiyan Ahmad Ansari described the work as a detailed cultural and historical study. The quarterly journal Fikr-o-Taḥrīr (Kolkata) praised the first volume for its treatment of Bahraich's geography, religious figures and freedom fighters. In 2024, Tahir Mahmood discussed Noor's work in his essay collection Merā junūn-i Urdū, calling it a notable attempt to record regional Urdu literary heritage. Both volumes were also listed in official sanction orders of the National Council for Promotion of Urdu Language, which provided grants for Urdu promotional activities in 2019 and 2021.

Apart from this series, Noor wrote Khanqah-e-Nayeemia Bahraich: Tarīkh ke Aurāq se Aaj tak and compiled collections such as Chamanistān-e-Bahraich, Khutbāt-e-Bahraich, and Sadā-i Watan.
