= Bahraich Lok Sabha constituency =

Lok Sabha Constituency in Uttar Pradesh, India

Coordinates: 27.58°N 81.6°E

Bahraich UP-56
- Lok Sabha constituency
- Interactive Map Outlining Bahraich Lok Sabha constituency

Constituency details
- Country: India
- Region: North India
- State: Uttar Pradesh
- Assembly constituencies: Balha; Nanpara; Matera; Mahasi; Bahraich
- Established: 1952
- Reservation: SC

Member of Parliament
- 18th Lok Sabha
- Incumbent Anand Kumar Gond
- Party: Bharatiya Janata Party
- Elected year: 2024

Bahraich Lok Sabha constituency is one of the 80 Lok Sabha (parliamentary) constituencies in Uttar Pradesh state in northern India. Bahraich is reserved for the SC category.

== Assembly segments ==
After delimitation, this constituency comprises the following five assembly segments:

No	Name	District	Member	Party	2024 Lead
282	Balha (SC)	Bahraich	Saroj Sonkar	BJP	BJP
283	Nanpara	Bahraich	Ram Niwas Verma	AD(S)	BJP
284	Matera	Bahraich	Mariya Shah	SP	SP
285	Mahasi	Bahraich	Sureshwar Singh	BJP	BJP
286	Bahraich	Bahraich	Anupma Jaiswal	BJP	SP

Before delimitation of parliamentary constituencies in 2008, Bahraich Lok Sabha constituency comprised the following five assembly segments:

1. Nanpara
2. Charda
3. Bhinga
4. Bahraich
5. Ikauna

== Members of Parliament ==
Year	Member	Party
1952	Rafi Ahmed Kidwai	Indian National Congress
1957	Jogendra Singh	Indian National Congress
1962	Kunwar Ram Singh	Swatantra Party
1967	K. K. Nayar	Bharatiya Jana Sangh
1971	Badlu Ram Shukla	Indian National Congress
1977	Om Prakash Tyagi	Janata Party
1980	Syed Muzaffar Hussain	Indian National Congress
1984	Arif Mohammed Khan	Indian National Congress
1989	Arif Mohammed Khan	Janata Dal
1991	Rudrasen Chaudhary	Bharatiya Janata Party
1996	Padamsen Chaudhary	Bharatiya Janata Party
1998	Arif Mohammed Khan	Bahujan Samaj Party
1999	Padamsen Chaudhary	Bharatiya Janata Party
2004	Rubab Sayda	Samajwadi Party
2009	Kamal Kishor	Indian National Congress
2014	Savitri Bai Phule	Bharatiya Janata Party
2019	Akshaibar Lal	Bharatiya Janata Party
2024	Anand Kumar Gond	Bharatiya Janata Party

== Election results ==
=== Lok Sabha election 2024 ===
2024 Indian general election: Bahraich
Party	Candidate	Votes	%	±%
BJP	Anand Kumar Gond	518,802	49.10	▼4.04
SP	Ramesh Gautam	4,54,575	43.02	▲2.89
BSP	Brijesh Kumar	50,448	4.77	▲4.77
NOTA	None of the Above	12,864	1.22	▼0.11
Majority		64,227	6.08	▼6.93
Turnout		10,56,566	57.46	▲0.22
BJP hold		Swing		

=== Lok Sabha election 2019 ===
2019 Indian general elections: Bahraich
Party	Candidate	Votes	%	±%
BJP	Akshaibar Lal	525,982	53.14	+6.86
SP	Shabbir Ahmad	3,97,230	40.13	+4.09
INC	Savitri Bai Phule	34,454	3.48	+0.87
IND.	Janardan Gond	5,179	0.52	New
IND.	Shiv Nandan	3,524	0.36	New
NOTA	None of the Above	13,189	1.33	−0.11
Majority		1,28,752	13.01	+2.77
Turnout		9,90,143	57.24	+0.22
BJP hold		Swing	+6.86	

=== Lok Sabha election 2014 ===
2014 Indian general elections: Bahraich
Party	Candidate	Votes	%	±%
BJP	Savitri Bai Phule	432,392	46.28	+32.34
SP	Shabbir Ahmad	3,36,747	36.04	+12.48
BSP	Dr. Vijay Kumar	96,904	10.37	−13.24
INC	Kamal Kishor	24,421	2.61	−28.60
AAP	Jagat Ram	8,319	0.89	New
NOTA	None of the Above	13,498	1.44	New
Majority		95,645	10.24	+2.64
Turnout		9,34,330	57.02	+15.90
BJP gain from INC		Swing	+32.34	

=== Lok Sabha election 2009 ===
2009 Indian general elections: Bahraich
Party	Candidate	Votes	%	±%
INC	Kamal Kishor	160,005	31.21	
BSP	Lal Mani Prasad	1,21,052	23.61	
SP	Shabbeer Ahmad	1,20,791	23.56	
BJP	Akshaibar Lal	71,492	13.94	
Majority		38,953	7.60	
Turnout		5,12,701	41.12	
INC gain from SP		Swing		

=== Lok Sabha election 1980 ===
- Mulana Saiyad Muzaffar Hussain (INC-I) : 112,358 votes
- Om Prakash Tyagi (BJS) : 62,468

=== Lok Sabha election 1971 ===
- Badlu Ram (INC) : 94,666 votes
- Om Prakash Tyagi (BJS) : 69,171

== See also ==
- Bahraich district
- List of constituencies of the Lok Sabha
