= Nagraur, Bahraich =

Coordinates: 27°34′N 81°39′E

Nagraur is a small village located in the Bahraich District of Uttar Pradesh, India. It is situated on Bahraich-Gonda highway, 7 km south-east of the main Bahraich city. It is connected to the city mainly by rickshaw and auto-rickshaw (also known as 'tempo') transportation systems. Nagraur is one of the villages in Chitaura Mandal in Bahraich District, and is located 6.5 km from its Mandal Main Chitaura.

== Neighborhood ==
Some of the villages near Nagraur are Deeha (0.5 km), Shahpur Jot Yusuf (1.4 km), Masihabad (1.6 km), Aminpur Nagraur (2.2 km) and Dularpur (2.3 km). Nagraur's nearby towns are Visheshwarganj (4.2 km), Bahraich (6.4 km), Chitaura (6.5 km) and Fakharpur (16.2 km). Chitaura, Ahiraura, Allia Bulbul, Aminpur Nagraur, Ashoka and Baghura are the villages along with this village in the same Chitaura Mandal.

== Denomination ==
There is a mixed population of Muslims and Hindus, although it is approximately 75 to 80% Muslim. Parsi and Chamar people live in the chamaran tola. Among Muslims, shi’ites live in the frontal zone. During the Islamic month of Moharram, Muslims and Hindus mourn the martyrdom of Imam Hussain in Karbala.

== History ==
According to common folk fare, there were three brothers, Baharmal, Nagarmal, and Chitarmal who established Bahraich, Nagraur and Chittaura respectively.

== Major festivals ==
The biggest gathering happens on the occasion of Ashura, the tenth of Muharram, for the commemoration of martyrdom of Imam Hussain.[3] A procession is taken out from Syedwada, and after passing through various roads, and lanes of the village, it ends at Karbala. People of all the faiths participate in the procession.[4] Other festivals are also celebrated with zeal, and fervor including Eid ul Fitr, Eid ul Azha and Diwali.
