= Ram Niwas Verma =

Member of the Uttar Pradesh Legislative Assembly

Member of the 18th Uttar Pradesh Legislative Assembly
- Incumbent
- Assumed office March 2022
- Constituency: Nanpara

Personal details
- Born: 1 January 1967 (age 59) Bahraich, Uttar Pradesh
- Party: Apna Dal (Soneylal)
- Profession: Politician

Ram Niwas Verma is an Indian politician and a member of the 18th Uttar Pradesh Assembly from the Nanpara Assembly constituency of Bahraich district. He is a member of the Apna Dal (Soneylal).

== Early life ==
Ram Niwas Verma was born on 1 December 1967 in Bahraich, Uttar Pradesh, to a Hindu family of Peshkar Prasad. He married Seema Devi, and they had one child.

== See also ==
- 18th Uttar Pradesh Assembly
- Nanpara Assembly constituency
- Uttar Pradesh Legislative Assembly
