= Raghaujot =

- Village
- Location within Uttar Pradesh Location within India
- Coordinates: 27.712°N 81.454°E
- Country: India
- State: Uttar Pradesh
- District: Bahraich

Languages
  - Official: Hindi
- Time zone: UTC+5:30 (IST)

Raghaujot is a village in the Bahraich district, Uttar Pradesh, India. It has the population of 1,690 people.
