= Zafar Mahmood =

Zafar Mahmood (Urdu: ظفر محمود) may refer to

- Zafar Mahmud (1923 – 2016), Royal Indian and later Pakistan Air Force officer
- Zafar Mahmood Abbasi, retired four-star admiral of the Pakistan Navy
- Syed Zafar Mahmood (born 1951), Indian civil-servant
