= Matera Assembly constituency =

Constituency of the Uttar Pradesh legislative assembly in India

Coordinates: 40.67°N 16.59°E

Matera
- Constituency No. 284 for the Uttar Pradesh Legislative Assembly

Constituency details
- Country: India
- Region: North India
- State: Uttar Pradesh
- District: Bahraich
- Total electors: 3,42,204
- Reservation: None

Member of Legislative Assembly
- 18th Uttar Pradesh Legislative Assembly
- Incumbent Mariya Shah
- Party: Samajwadi Party
- Elected year: 2022

Matera is a constituency of the Uttar Pradesh Legislative Assembly covering the city of Matera in the Bahraich district of Uttar Pradesh, India. Matera is one of five assembly constituencies in the Bahraich Lok Sabha constituency. Since 2008, this assembly constituency is numbered 284 amongst 403 constituencies.

== Members of the Legislative Assembly ==
Election	Name	Party
2012	Yasar Shah	Samajwadi Party
2017	Yasar Shah	Samajwadi Party
2022	Mariya Shah	Samajwadi Party

== Election results ==
=== 2027 ===
2027 Uttar Pradesh Legislative Assembly election: Matera
Party	Candidate	Votes	%	±%
INDIA				
NDA				
AIMIM	Shaukat Ali			
BSP				
Majority				
Turnout				
gain from		Swing		

=== 2022 ===
2022 Uttar Pradesh Legislative Assembly election: Matera
Party	Candidate	Votes	%	±%
SP	Mariya Shah	102,255	48.15	+8.7
BJP	Arun Veer Singh	91,827	43.24	+4.58
BSP	Aquib Ullah Khan	8,918	4.2	−12.48
INC	Ali Akbar	2,964	1.4	
NOTA	None of the above	2,759	1.3	−0.07
Majority		10,428	4.91	+4.12
Turnout		212,372	62.06	+0.26
SP hold		Swing		

=== 2017 ===
Samajwadi Party candidate Yasar Shah won in 2017 Uttar Pradesh Legislative Elections defeating Bharatiya Janta Party candidate Arun Veer Singh by a margin of 1,595 votes.

2017 Uttar Pradesh Legislative Assembly Election: Mater
Party	Candidate	Votes	%	±%
SP	Yasar Shah	79,188	39.45	
BJP	Arun Veer Singh	77,593	38.66	
BSP	Sultan Ahmad Khan	33,482	16.68	
RLD	Ganga Ram	2,141	1.07	
NOTA	None of the above	2,717	1.37	
Majority		1,595	0.79	
Turnout		200,725	61.8	
