= Nanpara Assembly constituency =

Constituency of the Uttar Pradesh legislative assembly in India

Coordinates: 27.87°N 81.50°E

Nanpara
- Constituency No. 283 for the Uttar Pradesh Legislative Assembly

Constituency details
- Country: India
- Region: North India
- State: Uttar Pradesh
- District: Bahraich
- Total electors: 3,43,881
- Reservation: None

Member of Legislative Assembly
- 18th Uttar Pradesh Legislative Assembly
- Incumbent Ram Niwas Verma
- Party: AD(S)
- Alliance: NDA
- Elected year: 2022
- Preceded by: Madhuri Verma

Nanpara is a constituency of the Uttar Pradesh Legislative Assembly covering the city of Nanpara in the Bahraich district of Uttar Pradesh, India. Nanpara is one of five assembly constituencies in the Bahraich Lok Sabha constituency. Since 2008, this assembly constituency is numbered 283 amongst 403 constituencies. It is represented by Apna Dal's candidate Ram Niwas Verma who won in the 2022 Uttar Pradesh Legislative Assembly election.

== Members of the Legislative Assembly ==
Election	Name	Party
2002	Jata Shankar Singh	Bharatiya Janata Party
2007	Waris Ali	Bahujan Samaj Party
2012	Madhuri Verma	Indian National Congress
2017	Madhuri Verma	Bharatiya Janata Party
2022	Ram Niwas Verma	Apna Dal (Sonelal)

== Election results ==
=== 2027 ===
2027 Uttar Pradesh Legislative Assembly election: Nanpara
Party	Candidate	Votes	%	±%
INDIA				
NDA				
BSP				
NOTA	None of the above			
Majority				
Turnout				
gain from		Swing		

=== 2022 ===
2022 Uttar Pradesh Legislative Assembly election: Nanpara
Party	Candidate	Votes	%	±%
AD(S)	Ram Niwas Verma	87,689	43.91	
SP	Madhuri Verma	75,505	37.81	
BSP	Hakikat Ali	17,949	8.99	−4.18
AIMIM	Maulana Laik Ahmad Shah	3,965	1.99	
CPI	Kuleraj Yadav	2,383	1.19	−0.43
INC	A. M. Siddiquie	2,154	1.08	−33.96
NOTA	None of the above	2,403	1.2	−0.44
Majority		12,184	6.1	−3.57
Turnout		199,694	58.07	−0.13
AD(S) gain from BJP		Swing		

=== 2017 ===
2017 Uttar Pradesh Legislative Assembly election: Nanpara
Party	Candidate	Votes	%	±%
BJP	Madhuri Verma	86,312	44.71	
INC	Waris Ali	67,643	35.04	
BSP	Abdul Waheed	25,430	13.17	
CPI	Kuleraj Yadav	3,131	1.62	
RLD	Kriparam	2,281	1.18	
RTKP	Yaseen	2,070	1.07	
NOTA	None of the above	3,121	1.64	
Majority		18,669	9.67	
Turnout		193,040	58.2	
