= Shughni =

Shughni, Shighni (In the local language: хуг̌ну̊н зив, tr. khughnön ziv; Tajik: шуғнонӣ, tr. shughnoni; Persian: شغنانی, tr. shughnoni) may refer to:

- Shughni language, spoken in Afghanistan and Tajikistan
- Shughni people, people residing on both sides of the border of Afghanistan and Tajikistan alongside the Panj River (Oxus)
- shughni hat, A type of traditional hat used by the Shoghnan people in Tajikistan and Afghanistan.

== See also ==
- Shighnan District, Badakhshan, Afghanistan
  - Shighnan, its capital
- Shughnon District, Gorno-Badakhshan Autonomous Region, Tajikistan
  - Shughnon Range, part of the Pamirs
