= Waqar Ahmad Shah =

Indian politician (1943–2018)

Waqar Ahmed Shah

MLA, Uttar Pradesh Legislative Assembly
- In office December 1993 – October 1995
- Preceded by: Brij Raj Tripathi
- Succeeded by: vacant
- Constituency: Bahraich
- In office October 1996 – March 2017
- Preceded by: Vacant
- Succeeded by: Anupama Jaiswal
- Constituency: Bahraich

Deputy Speaker, Uttar Pradesh Legislative Assembly
- In office 14 November 2003 – 26 July 2004
- Preceded by: Dr. Ammar Rizvi
- Succeeded by: Rajesh Agarwal

Uttar Pradesh Legislative Assembly Acting Speaker
- In office 19 May 2004 – May 2007

Cabinet Minister for Labour and Employment
- In office 15 March 2012 – 2014
- Succeeded by: Shahid Manzoor

Personal details
- Born: 6 July 1943 Bahraich, United Provinces, British India
- Died: 15 April 2018 (aged 74) Lucknow, Uttar Pradesh, India
- Resting place: Bahraich
- Party: Samajwadi Party
- Spouse: Rubab Sayda
- Children: 1 son (Yasar Shah), 1 daughter
- Parent: Khwaja Qamaruddin (father)
- Relatives: Mariya Shah (daughter-in-law)
- Education: Medical Graduate (B.A.M.S.)
- Alma mater: Kanpur University
- Occupation: Politician, Physician
- Profession: Agriculture, Medicine

Waqar Ahmed Shah (6 July 1943 – 15 April 2018) was an Indian politician, medical graduate, and member of the Samajwadi Party. He served five terms as Member of the Uttar Pradesh Legislative Assembly from Bahraich, holding various legislative and ministerial roles between 1993 and 2017.

== Early life and career ==
Waqar Ahmad Shah was born in Bahraich on 6 July 1943 to Khwaja Kamaruddin. He completed his medical education at Kanpur University.

He worked as an unpaid medical officer at Dargah Sharif Hospital between 1975 and 1982 and was actively associated with several local institutions, including Azad Inter College, Maharaj Singh Inter College, the Indian Medical Association (Bahraich branch), the Red Cross, and the District Eye Relief Society.

== Political career ==
Shah’s political journey began with the Janata Dal, participating in the 1989 "Jail Bharo Andolan", during which he was detained briefly.

He was first elected to the Uttar Pradesh Legislative Assembly in 1993 as a Samajwadi Party (SP) candidate and was re-elected in 1996, 2002, 2007, and 2012.

His political roles included:

- Secretary, SP Legislature Party (1993)
- Member, Public Accounts Committee (1993–94, 2002–03)
- Chief Whip, SP Legislature Party (1996–2003)
- Member, Questions & References Committee (1997–98)
- Deputy Speaker, Uttar Pradesh Assembly (Nov 2003 – May 2004)
- Acting Speaker (May–July 2004)
- Minister for Labour and Employment, Mulayam Singh Yadav ministry (Aug 2004 – May 2007)
- Deputy Leader, SP Legislature Party (2007–2012)
- Cabinet Minister for Labour and Employment in the Akhilesh Yadav ministry (2012–2014)

Due to serious illness, his ministerial duties were transferred to his son, Yasser Shah, in 2014.

In 2015, a petition was filed seeking his disqualification under Article 191 of the Constitution due to his prolonged coma and inability to perform legislative duties.

== Public profile and political image ==
Shah was regarded as one of the prominent Muslim faces in the SP and was appointed deputy leader of the party in the Assembly following Azam Khan’s removal in 2009.

He served in the Akhilesh Yadav cabinet alongside other Muslim ministers like Azam Khan and Ahmad Hasan.

In 2012, he stated he had declared his assets, although the government website did not reflect this at the time.

== Personal life ==
He was married to Rubab Sayda, a former Member of Parliament, on 5 January 1975. They had one son and one daughter. His son, Yasar Shah, later served as Minister of State for Energy in the Uttar Pradesh government.

== Death ==
Waqar Ahmed Shah died on 15 April 2018 at Civil Hospital in Lucknow, after nearly six years in a coma. He had been in a coma since June 2013 following complications from cardiac surgery, which led to cerebral anoxia.

His funeral prayer was held on 16 April 2018 after the Zuhr prayer at the ground of Azad Inter College in Bahraich, led by Arshad Al-Qadri, the Shahi Imam of the Dargah of Sayyid Salar Masud Ghazi. Shah was buried at his ancestral graveyard located at Chhadey Shah Takiya in Bahraich.

Several political leaders and party members, including Akhilesh Yadav, Ahmad Hasan, and Rajendra Choudhary, paid their respects at the funeral.
