= Bahraich railway station =

Railway Station in Uttar Pradesh, India

- Indian Railways logo

General information
- Location: Bahraich, Uttar Pradesh; India
- Coordinates: 27.5816396°N 81.605411°E
- Elevation: 125 metres (410 ft)
- System: Indian Railways station
- Owner: Indian Railways
- Operator: North Eastern Railway
- Lines: Towards Mailani (MLN) & NepalGunj Road / Towards Gonda (GD)
- Platforms: 3
- Tracks: 5 Electrification = Electrified
- Connections: Auto stand

Construction
- Structure type: At grade
- Parking: Yes
- Cycle facilities: No

Other information
- Status: Active
- Station code: BRK
- Zone(s): Northern Eastern Railway

History
- Opened: 24 hours
Location
- Location within India Location within Uttar Pradesh

Bahraich railway station is a main railway station in Bahraich district, Uttar Pradesh, India. Its code is BRK. It serves the city of Bahraich.

== Architecture and facilities ==
The station consists of three platforms, two for broad gauge, and one for metre gauge. The platforms are well sheltered.

It has all facilities that a standard railway station should have like water, sanitation, recreation, seating lounge, circulating areas etc.

== Route ==
Bahraich is on Indian Railways route map and provides a newly constructed broad-gauge line, running from Gonda to Bahraich. The work of electrification is done by North Eastern Railways.

== Meter gauge ==
In addition to broad gauge line, the last conserved meter gauge railway line of North Eastern Railways are also being operated from Bahraich railway station. Until 2018, the entire route from Gonda Jn. to Izzatnagar was meter gauge, and railways was running several MG Reserved and unreserved trains on this route. But later in the 2016 railway budget it was planned to convert the 60 KM section of Gonda Jn. to Bahraich from meter gauge to broad gauge. After this gauge conversion, MG trains towards the direction of Mailani & Nanpara started to being operated from Bahraich Railway Station. At present only a few trains are running on the meter gauge section. The Mailani Railway section is one of the most beautiful railway routes in Uttar Pradesh as it passes through the Dudhwa wildlife sanctuary and tiger reserve. In 2020 due to conflict between Indian Railways and the forest reserve in context of security of wild animals, the forest reserve appealed a plea in high court to stop the trains on this section. After the hearing, the court ordered a stay on train movement on this section. But after some months again trains were started, as the matter resolved between the railways and forest department.

== Operations ==
The trains on the section are running from 9 November 2018.

State rail minister Manoj Sinha flagged off 75023 GD–BRK Spl. DEMU train from Gonda Junction.

== The Bahraich-Jarwal Road new rail line project ==
The Bahraich-Jarwal Road new rail line project is progressing steadily, and the administration aims to complete it by 2027.

Here are the key updates regarding this ambitious railway project:

Current Status and Progress

DPR and Survey Completed: According to information shared by Union Railway Minister Ashwini Vaishnaw in Parliament, the final location survey and the Detailed Project Report (DPR) for this approximately 65 to 70 km long new broad-gauge line have been fully completed.

Project Budget: The estimated total cost of this entire railway project is around ₹530 crores^ Refer news links in the bottom (4+5+6+7).

Land Acquisition: The process to acquire land across 62 villages under the Bahraich and Kaiserganj tehsils is actively underway. The district administration is finalizing the documentation and ground-level procedures.

Proposed Railway Stations

This new direct rail route between Bahraich & Jarwal Road will feature 3 new railway stations and 1 halt:

Jarwal Kasba (Station) Kaiserganj (Station) Fakharpur (Station) Parsendi Sugar Mill (Halt)

Expected Benefits for Passengers

Currently, trains traveling from Bahraich to Jarwal Road must take a longer detour via Gonda Junction. Once this new direct line is operational, commuting from Bahraich, Shravasti, and Balrampur to major cities like Lucknow and Delhi will become faster.

With the DPR cleared and land acquisition in its advanced stages, the railways intend to finish laying the tracks promptly to start train operations by 2027.

Jarwal Road, Bahraich (UP) is a broad-gauge station 55 kilometers (34 miles) from district headquarters and lies on the Gorakhpur–Lucknow main line. However, Jarwal road railway station is not connected with Bahraich railway station. Demand for direct train connectivity was at its peak since the budget was sanctioned in 1997 (21 years ago), despite no additional work started, including land acquisition work which was pending from years.

== Khalilabad Railway Line ==
The central cabinet in the 2019 parliament sessions sanctioned a total budget of 4,939.78 crore. The total length of the new broad gauge line will be 240.26 km, an official statement said. The new line, which will cross towns such as Bhinga, Shravasti, Balrampur, Uttraula, Domariyaganj, Mehdawal and Bansi, is likely expected to be completed by 2024–25.

== Goods loading/unloading yard ==
The goods unloading station of BRK is constructed in Chilwariya, a small town at a distance of 12 KM from city railway station. This unloading/loading station was created there to majorly facilitate the supply of sugarcanes and sugar from/to Simbhavli Sugar Mills. Apart from these fertilizers, oils are also being transported here on a regular basis.
