= Rhubarb (disambiguation) =

Rhubarb is an herbaceous perennial plant in the genus Rheum cultivated as a vegetable.

- Rhubarb may also be used as the English name for the genus Rheum (plant) and some of its species.
- Giant rhubarb may refer to Gunnera manicata, an unrelated plant.
- Rhubarb diet, a fad diet, originating in the Huangdi Neijing, which is gaining popularity in Western Europe
- Rhubarb forcer, bell shaped pot with a lid-covered opening at the top used to protect the plant
- Rhubarb pie, a pie, popular in Sweden, UK, Ireland and the New England and Upper Midwestern regions of the United States
- Rhubarb crumble, a popular way of cooking rhubarb
- Rhubarb Triangle, a 23 km^{2} triangle in West Yorkshire, England between Wakefield, Morley and Rothwell, known for producing early forced rhubarb

Rhubarb may also refer to:

- Rhubarb (1951 film), a US baseball comedy
- Rhubarb (1969 film), a British short film
  - Rhubarb Rhubarb, a 1980 remake of the 1969 film
- Rhubarb (band), Australian rock band
- "Rhubarb", the alternate title for the third untitled song on Aphex Twin's album Selected Ambient Works Volume II
- Rhubarb Radio, an internet and community radio station in Birmingham, England
- Rhubarb (sound effect), a sound effect mimicking the murmur of a crowd
- An RAF World War II code name for operations by aircraft seeking opportunity targets, such as Circus offensives over occupied France in 1941.
- For the use of the word as meaning a dispute or fight, especially in sports, see Bench-clearing brawl

== See also ==
- Roobarb, a British children's series
- Rhubarb Jones (1951–2017), American disc jockey
- Rubab (disambiguation)
