= Mohammad Imlaq Khan =

Indian politician

Member of the Uttar Pradesh Legislative Council Bahraich

Personal details
- Political party: Samajwadi Party

Mohammad Imlaq Khan is an Indian politician and member of the Uttar Pradesh Legislative Council. He represents the constituency Bahraich as a member of the Samajwadi Party.
