= Shughni hat =

Hats used in Tajikistan and Afghanistan

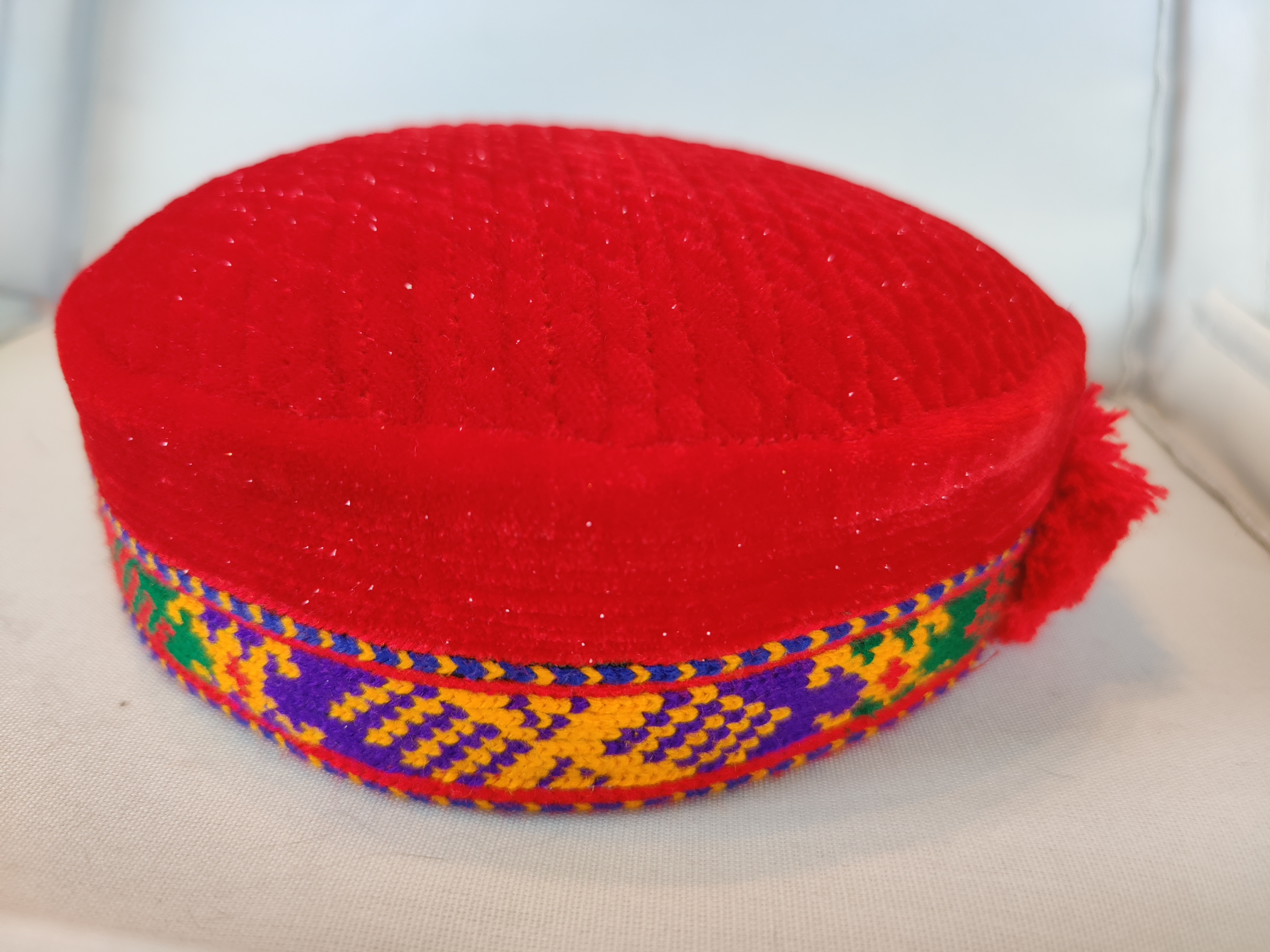
An example of a Shughni taqin

Shughni taqin, known in Afghanistan as the Tajik taqin and Badakhshani taqin, is a traditional form of headwear worn among the people of Badakhshan in Afghanistan and Tajikistan. It is one of the traditional forms of headwear of the Pamir and differs from taqins of other regions of Tajikistan in its shape, colors, and decorative techniques. Its characteristic features include a rounded shape and a plain, undecorated crown surrounded by a narrow decorative band.

== Origin ==
Shughna is a region of Badakhshan divided by the Amu Darya between Shughni District in Afghanistan and Shughnon District in Tajikistan. The headwear known as the Shughni taqin originates in Shughni, Ishkashim, Khorugh, Roshtqal'a and Rushon.

== Shape and appearance ==
The Shughni taqin is generally round and low in height, with a plain crown. Unlike many square-shaped and heavily ornamented taqins found in other parts of Tajikistan, the crown of this type is generally not covered with extensive embroidery. Instead, its visual emphasis is placed on the simple form of the cap and the decorative band around its circumference. This characteristic is also found in descriptions of taqins from Shughni, Rushon, Roshtqal'a and Khorugh.

In addition to its rounded form, the Shughni taqin has a structure known locally as tag-pahni, a term used in descriptions of its shape and construction. Differences in the shape and height of various parts of the taqin, together with its colors and shiraz, are among the features distinguishing it from taqins of other regions of Tajikistan.

== Shiraz ==
The most important decorative element of the Shughni taqin is the shiraz. The shiraz is a narrow, patterned band placed around the taqin, marking the boundary between the plain crown and the edge of the cap. In the Shughni language, the term is also used in forms such as шерозӣ.

The shiraz is embroidered on a white background using cotton and silk threads, as well as gold- and silver-colored fibers. The use of this band allows the main body of the taqin to remain plain while giving its outer section a patterned and colorful appearance.

The term shiraz in Shughni usage is associated with the Persian word shiraza, referring to an edging or narrow band sewn around a taqin, garment, or sleeve.

== Colors of the shiraz ==
One of the recognizable features of the Shughni taqin is the color combination of its decorative band. In known examples of this type of taqin, red, green and blue are found in the surrounding band, making the border the principal decorative element against the plain crown. Sources concerning Pamiri taqins also emphasize the importance of color and the shiraz in distinguishing these forms of headwear.

The color red has particular importance in Shughni clothing traditions. Among the people of Shughni, red in women's clothing and adornment has been associated with concepts such as radiance, beauty, youth and chastity, and has also been used in bridal dress.

However, the meaning of each color used in the shiraz should not be interpreted as fixed and independent of its cultural context. The available sources primarily discuss the general importance of colors and the use of red in Shughni clothing, rather than assigning a separate symbolic meaning to each colored band of the taqin.

== Color and age ==
In Pamiri clothing traditions, the color of a taqin has in some areas been associated with the age of its wearer. For example, red has been reported for young people, blue for adults, and green for elderly people. This classification is mentioned in descriptions of taqins from Khorugh, Rushon, Roshtqal'a and Shughni.

This association between color and age should not be regarded as an absolute or permanent rule, since the use of colors has changed across periods and contexts. Red, for example, was also used in Shughni bridal clothing.

== Ceremonial use ==
In the past, the Shughni taqin was also part of everyday clothing. Women could wear the taqin under a large shawl when going outside the home, with the shawl placed over it.

Red held a particularly prominent position in Shughni women's clothing, especially bridal dress, and red taqins were worn alongside other red elements of bridal attire.

== Pulak or pupak ==
An ornamental element known as pulak (пулкак), or in other forms such as pulak and polak, is attached to the taqin. This element is made of silk thread and is connected to the shiraz on the side of the taqin.

The pulak had different positions for women and men. Women wore it on the left side, while men wore it on the right. This difference in the manner of wearing the headwear is one of the distinctive details of traditional Shughni dress.

In some interpretations of Pamiri taqins, the side tassel or pupak is regarded as having a protective function associated with folk beliefs. However, this interpretation should be presented as a cultural interpretation rather than as a certain fact concerning the origin of this element.

== Differences from other Tajik taqins ==
The Shughni taqin differs from many other Tajik taqins in its rounded form, plain crown, shiraz and color combination. Whereas examples such as the Chust taqin have a square structure and distinctive patterns on the surface of the cap, the Shughni taqin places greater emphasis on its rounded form and decorative border.

These characteristics have made the Shughni taqin one of the distinctive forms of traditional headwear of the Pamir.

== The Shughni taqin and Pamiri identity ==
The Shughni taqin occupies a distinctive place in the cultural representation of the peoples of the Pamir. In Russian ethnographic sources, this type of taqin is presented as one of the characteristic visual elements associated with the people of Badakhshan. Its simple body, colorful border and rounded form create a distinctive representation of traditional Shughni dress.

The differences in the appearance of taqins across Badakhshan, including variations in shape, color and shiraz, form part of the regional diversity of Pamiri clothing. The Shughni taqin occupies a distinct place within this tradition, and its characteristics are closely connected with the clothing traditions of the people of Badakhshan.

== Gallery ==
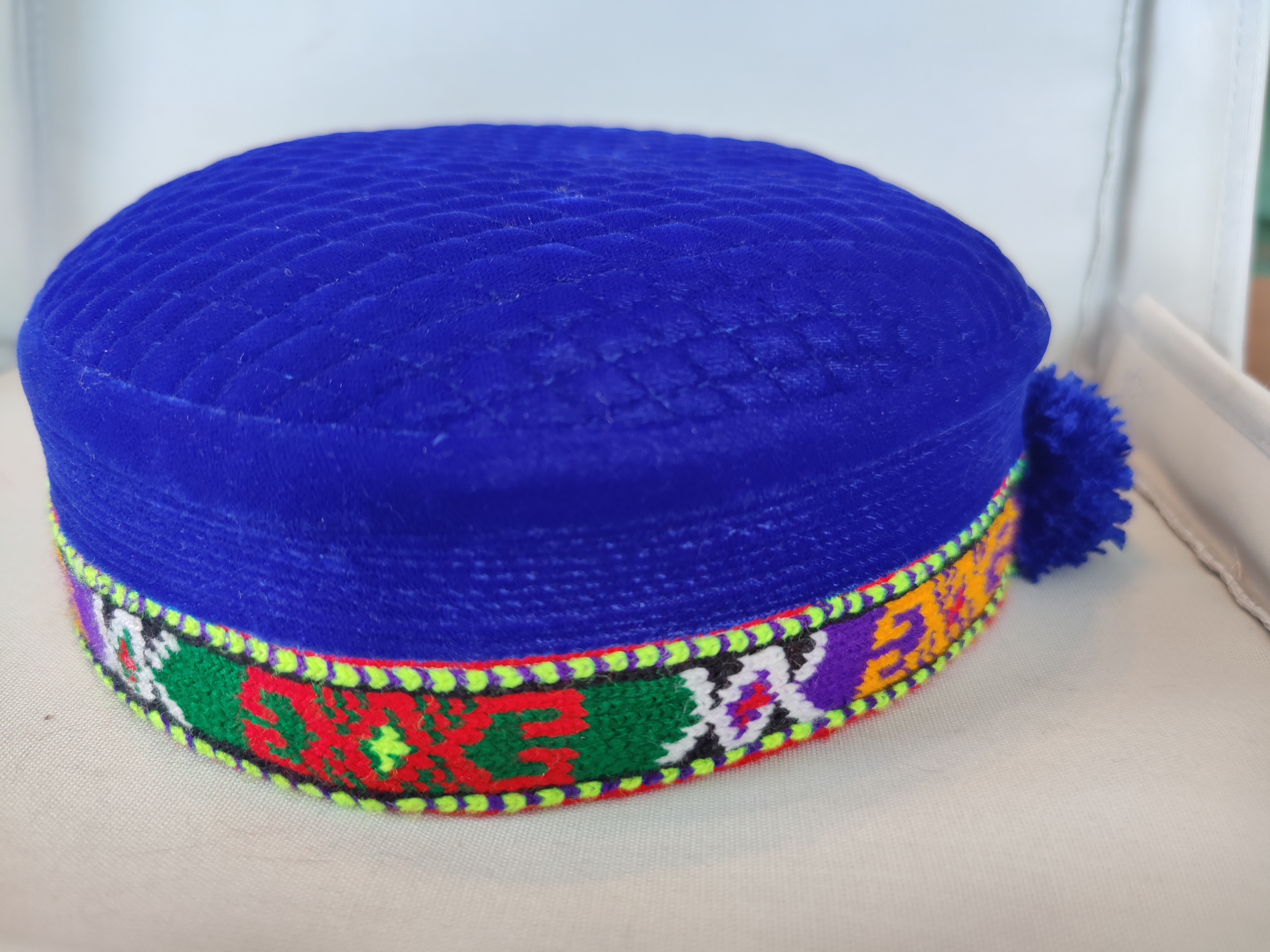
A blue Shughni taqin

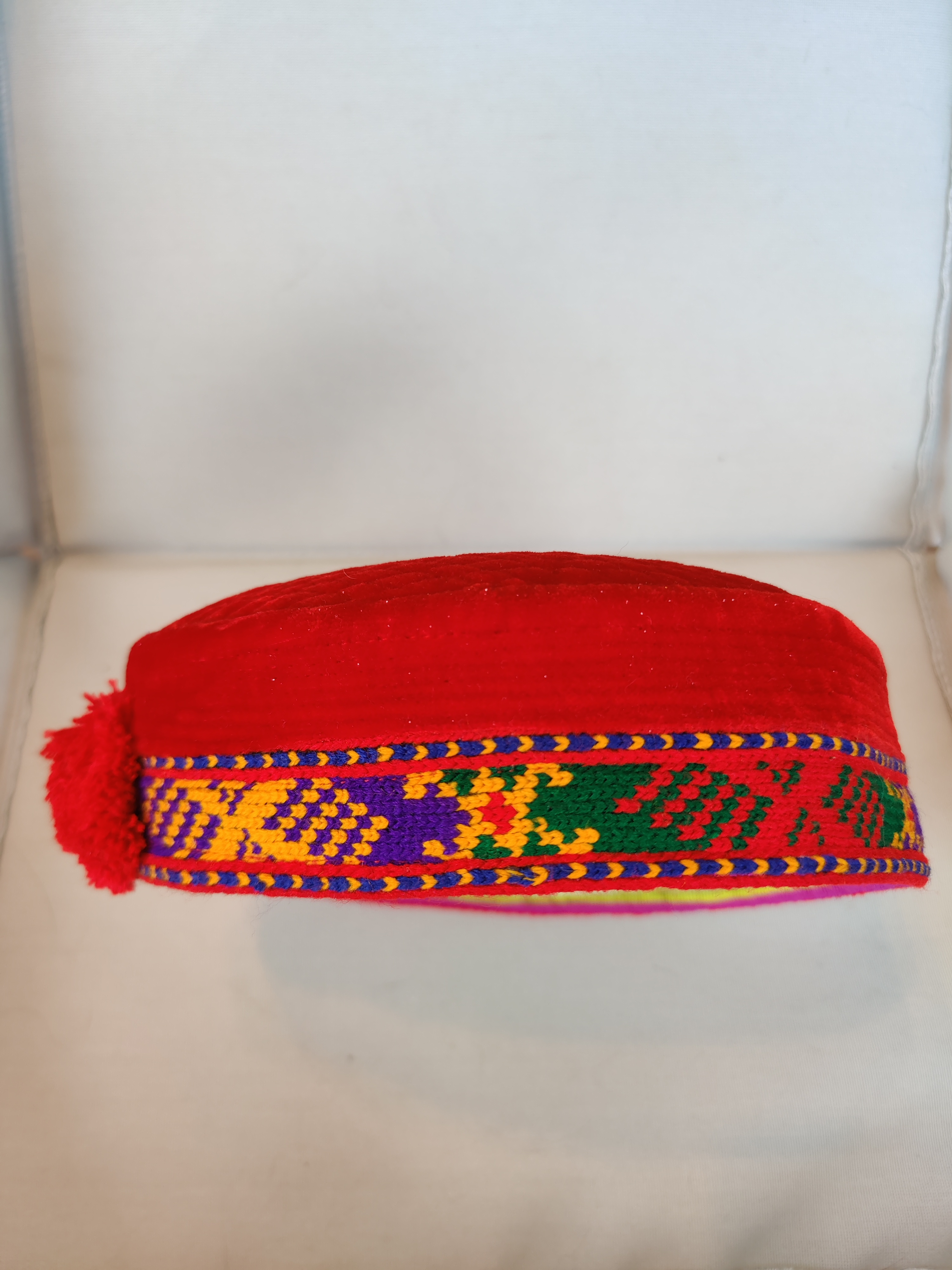
A red Shughni taqin

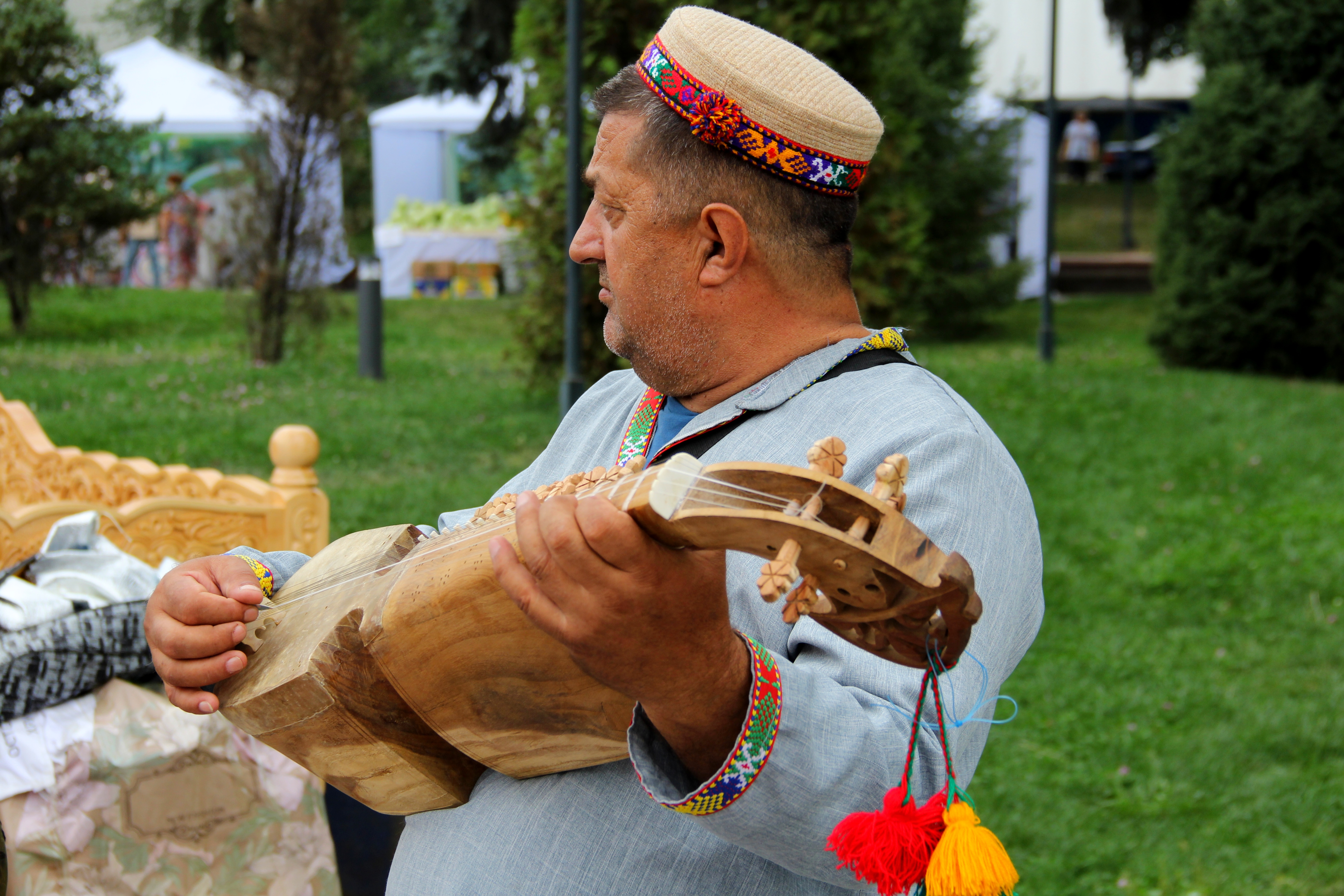
A Tajik man playing the rubab wearing a brown taqin

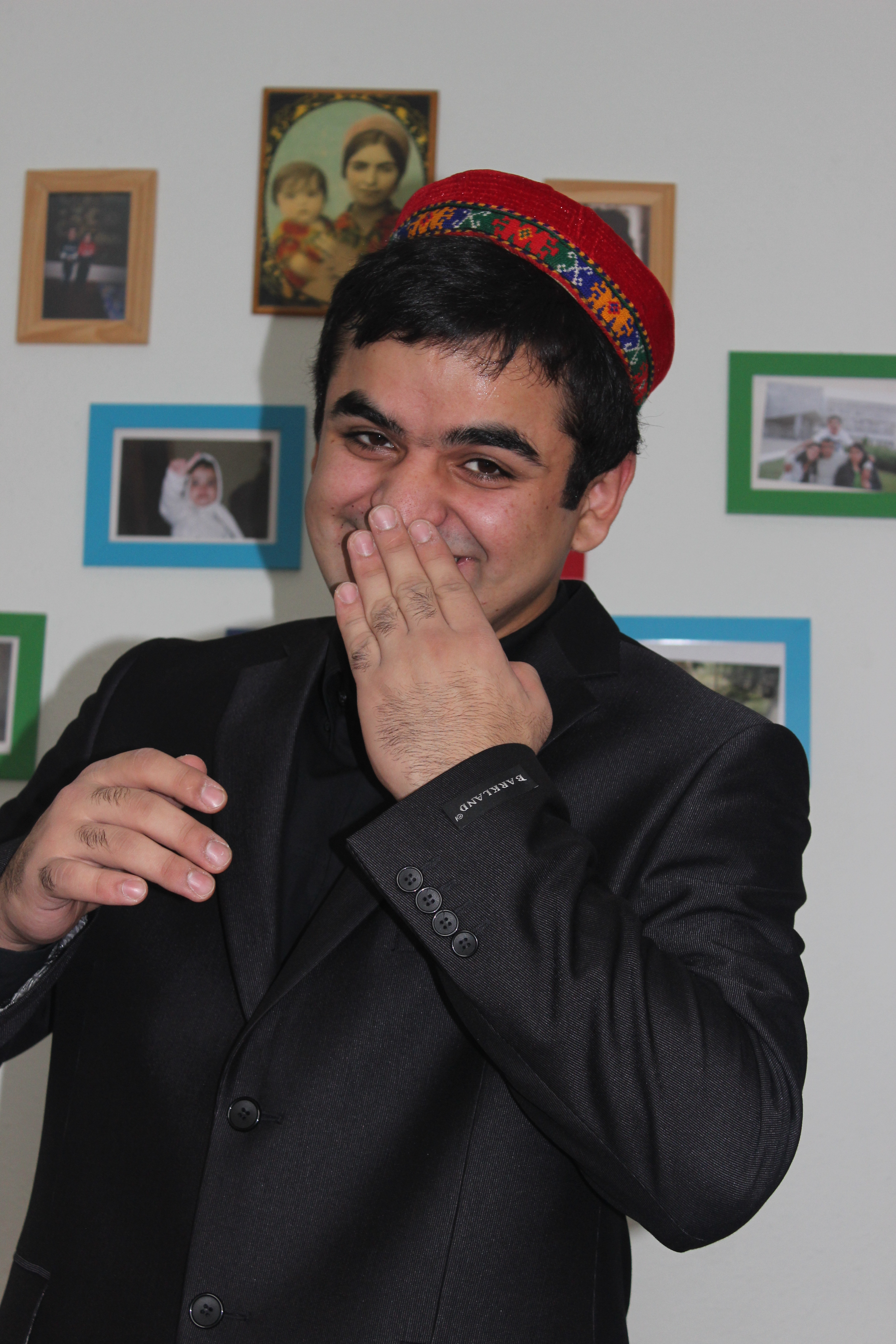
A Tajik man wearing a red taqin
