= Kamal Kishor =

Indian politician

Member of Parliament, 15th Lok Sabha
- In office May 2009 – May 2014
- Preceded by: Rubab Sayda
- Succeeded by: Savitri Bai Phule
- Constituency: Bahraich

Personal details
- Born: 1 September 1956 (age 70) Rajdhani, Gorakhpur (Uttar Pradesh)
- Citizenship: India
- Party: Indian National Congress
- Education: Indian Armed Forces Institution
- Profession: Defense services, farmer, businessperson, politician
- Committees: Member of several committees

'Commando Kamal Kishor' is an Indian politician and a former Member of Parliament of India. He was a member of the 15th Lok Sabha. Kishor represents the Bahraich constituency of Uttar Pradesh and is a member of the Indian National Congress political party.

== Early life and education ==
Kishor was born in the village Rajdhani, Gorakhpur in the state of Uttar Pradesh, Dhobi family. After joining the Indian Armed Forces, he completed his graduation (B.A.) from Indian Armed Forces Institution. Kishor served in the Indian Armed Forces before entering politics. Post his army service, he has worked as a businessperson and agriculturist.

== Political career ==
Kishor has been in active politics since early 2000s and joined Indian National Congress party. He is a first time M.P. and is also a member of several committees. Kishor succeeded Rubab Sayda of Samajwadi Party from the Lok Sabha constituency.

== Posts held ==
#	From	To	Position
01	2009	2014	Member, 15th Lok Sabha
02	2009	2014	Member, Executive Committee, Congress Parliamentary Party
03	2009	2014	Member, Committee on Defense
04	2009	2014	Member, Committee on the Welfare of Scheduled Castes and Scheduled Tribes
05	2009	2014	Member, Permanent Special Invitee, Consultative Committee, Ministry of Railways
06	2009	2014	Member, Consultative Committee, Ministry of Rural Development
07	2009	2014	Member, Hindi Rajbhasha Samiti, Ministry of Power

== See also ==
- 15th Lok Sabha
- Lok Sabha
- Politics of India
- Parliament of India
- Government of India
- Indian National Congress
- Bahraich (Lok Sabha constituency)
