= Mariya Shah =

Indian politician (born 1984)

Mariya Ali Shah

Member of Uttar Pradesh Legislative Assembly
- Incumbent
- Assumed office March 2022
- Preceded by: Yasar Shah
- Constituency: Matera

Personal details
- Born: 29 July 1984 (age 42) Kanpur, Uttar Pradesh
- Party: Samajwadi Party
- Spouse: Yasar Shah
- Children: 3
- Parent: Arif Ali (father)
- Profession: Politician

Mariya Shah (born 29 July 1984), also known as Mariya Ali Shah, is an Indian politician from Uttar Pradesh. She is a member of the 18th Uttar Pradesh Assembly from the Matera Assembly constituency of Bahraich district. She is a member of the Samajwadi Party.

== Early life ==
Mariya Shah was born on 29 July 1984 in Kanpur, Uttar Pradesh, to a Muslim family of Arif Ali. She married Yasar Shah on 14 July 2015, and they had three children.

== Career ==
Mariya won the 2022 Uttar Pradesh Legislative Assembly election.

== Posts held ==
#	From	To	Position	Comments
01	2022	Incumbent	Member, 18th Uttar Pradesh Assembly	

== See also ==
- 18th Uttar Pradesh Assembly
- Matera Assembly constituency
- Uttar Pradesh Legislative Assembly
