= Kaisarganj =

Kaisarganj कैसरगंज
- Town and Tehsil
- Location in Uttar Pradesh, India
- Coordinates: 27.4167°N 81.5333°E
- Country: India
- State: Uttar Pradesh
- District: Bahraich

Government
  - Type: Nagar Panchayat
  - Body: Kaisarganj Nagar Panchayat

Area
  - Total: 1,059.4 km^{2} (409.0 sq mi)
- Elevation: 112 m (367 ft)

Population (2011)
  - Total: 824,786
  - Density: 779/km^{2} (2,020/sq mi)

Languages
  - Official: Hindi, Urdu
  - Regional: Awadhi
- Time zone: UTC+5:30 (IST)
- PIN: 271903
- Telephone code: 05251
- Vehicle registration: UP-40

Kaisarganj (Hindi: कैसरगंज) is a town, tehsil, and nagar panchayat in the Bahraich district of Uttar Pradesh. It is located on National Highway 927 in the Awadh region and is part of the Kaisarganj Lok Sabha constituency. The town serves as an administrative centre for the surrounding rural areas. Nearby places include Shravasti and Ayodhya. Shakuntala Nayar, Beni Prasad Verma, and Brij Bhushan Sharan Singh have served as elected representatives of the Kaisarganj Lok Sabha constituency.
