= Akshaibar Lal =

Indian politician

Member of Parliament, Lok Sabha
- In office 23 May 2019 – 4 June 2024
- Preceded by: Savitri Bai Phule
- Succeeded by: Anand Kumar Gond
- Constituency: Bahraich

Member of Legislative Assembly, Uttar Pradesh
- In office 11 March 2017 – 5 June 2019
- Preceded by: Bansidhar Bauddh
- Succeeded by: Saroj Sonkar
- Constituency: Balha

Personal details
- Born: 1 January 1947 (age 79)
- Party: Bharatiya Janata Party
- Spouse: Urmila Devi (m. 1966)
- Children: 4

Akshaibar Lal (born 1 January 1947; also known as Akshaywar Lal Gond) is an Indian politician. He was elected to the Lok Sabha, lower house of the Parliament of India from Bahraich, Uttar Pradesh in the 2019 Indian general election as a member of the Bharatiya Janata Party. He defeated his nearest rival, Shabbir Balmiki of Samajwadi Party by 1,28,752 votes. He was a member of the 17th Uttar Pradesh Legislative Assembly from Balha from 2017 to 2019. He also represented the Ikauna constituency from 1993 to 2007. Lal served as an MLA for five terms.

== Personal life ==
Lal was born on 1 January 1947 to Bhagwan Das Gond in Barhaj city of Deoria district. He passed 10th standard in 1963 from Shri Krishan Intermediate College, Barhaj Deoria. He married Urmila Devi on 21 June 1966, with whom he has three daughters and a son. He is an agriculturist by profession.
