= Balha Assembly constituency =

Constituency of the Uttar Pradesh legislative assembly in India

Coordinates: 27.84°N 81.52°E

Balha
- Constituency No. 282 for the Uttar Pradesh Legislative Assembly

Constituency details
- Country: India
- Region: North India
- State: Uttar Pradesh
- District: Bahraich
- Total electors: 3,62,718
- Reservation: SC

Member of Legislative Assembly
- 18th Uttar Pradesh Legislative Assembly
- Incumbent Saroj Sonkar
- Party: Bharatiya Janata Party
- Elected year: 2022
- Preceded by: Akshaibar Lal

Balha is a constituency of the Uttar Pradesh Legislative Assembly covering the city of Balha in the Bahraich district of Uttar Pradesh, India.

Balha is one of five assembly constituencies in the Bahraich Lok Sabha constituency.

Current MLA is Saroj Sonkar of Bharatiya Janta Party who won in the 2022 Uttar Pradesh Legislative Assembly election.

== Members of Legislative Assembly ==
Elected year	MLA	Party
Before 2008: Constituency does not exist
2012	Savitri Bai Fule	Bharatiya Janata Party
2014^	Banshidhar Baudh	Samajwadi Party
2017	Akshaibar Lal	Bharatiya Janata Party
2019^	Saroj Sonkar	Bharatiya Janata Party
2022	Saroj Sonkar	Bharatiya Janata Party

== Election results ==
=== 2027 ===
2027 Uttar Pradesh Legislative Assembly election: Balha
Party	Candidate	Votes	%	±%
INDIA				
NDA				
BSP				
NOTA	None of the above			
Majority				
Turnout				
gain from		Swing		

=== 2022 ===
2022 Uttar Pradesh Legislative Assembly election: Balha
Party	Candidate	Votes	%	±%
BJP	Saroj Sonkar	100,483	46.78	▼4.68
SP	Akshaybar Nath Kanaujiya	83,910	39.06	▲24.56
BSP	Ramchandra	15,578	7.25	▼21.17
AAP	Laxmi Nagar Sonkar	2,650	1.23	
Jan Adhikar Party	Jitendra Kumar	2,491	1.16	
VIP	Deepak	2,242	1.04	
INC	Kiran Bharti	2,125	0.99	
NOTA	None of the above	2,689	1.25	▼0.45
Majority		16,573	7.72	▼15.32
Turnout		214,812	59.22	▲1.32
BJP hold		Swing		

=== 2019 ===
UP By-election, 2019: Balha
Party	Candidate	Votes	%	±%
BJP	Saroj Sonkar	89,641	48.34	−3.12
SP	Kiran Bharti	43,154	23.27	+8.77
BSP	Ramesh Chandra	31,640	17.06	−11.36
Jai Hind Samaj Party	Baijnath	5745	3.10	
Jan Adhikar Party	Ram Dayal	4762	2.57	
BMP	Dhanpat Prasad	2445	1.32	
CPI	Koyali	2244	1.21	
NOTA	None of the above	2102	1.13	−0.54
Majority		46,487	25.07	+2.03
Turnout		185430	51.87	−6.03
BJP hold		Swing		

=== 2017 ===
2017 Uttar Pradesh Legislative Assembly election: Balha
Party	Candidate	Votes	%	±%
BJP	Akshaibar Lal	104,135	51.46	
BSP	Kiran Bharti	57,519	28.42	
SP	Banshi Dhar Baudh	29,349	14.5	
NOTA	None of the above	3,382	1.7	
Majority		46,616	23.04	
Turnout		202,367	57.9	
BJP hold		Swing		
