= Anupama Jaiswal =

Indian politician

Minister of Basic Education Government of Uttar Pradesh
- In office 19 March 2017 – 20 August 2019
- Chief Minister: Yogi Adityanath
- Succeeded by: Satish Chandra Dwivedi

Minister of Child Development & Nutrition Government of Uttar Pradesh
- In office 19 March 2017 – 20 August 2019
- Chief Minister: Yogi Adityanath
- Succeeded by: Swati Singh

Member of Uttar Pradesh Legislative Assembly
- Incumbent
- Assumed office 11 March 2017
- Preceded by: Waqar Ahmad Shah
- Constituency: Bahraich

Personal details
- Born: 3 February 1967 (age 59) Bahraich, Uttar Pradesh, India
- Party: Bharatiya Janata Party
- Spouse: Ashok Kumar Jaiswal (m. 1989)
- Children: 1 son, 2 daughters
- Parent: Ravindra Kant
- Education: MA, LLB from Avadh University
- Profession: Politician, Businesswoman

Anupama Jaiswal is an Indian politician and a member of 17th and 18th Legislative Assembly of Uttar Pradesh of India. She represents the Bahraich constituency of Uttar Pradesh and is a member of the Bharatiya Janata Party.

== Early life and education ==
Jaiswal was born 2 March 1967 in Bahraich, Uttar Pradesh to her father Ravindra Kant Jaiswal. She belongs to Kalwar (Jaiswal) community. In 1989 she married Ashok Kumar Jaiswal, who is a Bank Manager by profession, they have one son (Shivam Jaiwal) and two daughters (Aishwarya Jaiswal & Swati Shree Jaiswal). In 1999, she got Master of Arts degree and in 2010 she got Bachelor of Laws degree from Dr. Ram Manohar Lohia Avadh University, Faizabad.

== Political career ==
Jaiswal is a member of Seventeenth Legislative Assembly of Uttar Pradesh. In 2017 elections she was elected MLA from Bahraich, she defeated her nearest rival Samajwadi Party candidate Rubab Sayda by a margin of 6,702 votes. She was appointed Minister of State for Basic Education, Child Development and Nutrition, Revenue, Finance in Yogi Adityanath ministry.
