= Yasar Shah =

Indian politician from Uttar Pradesh (born 1977)

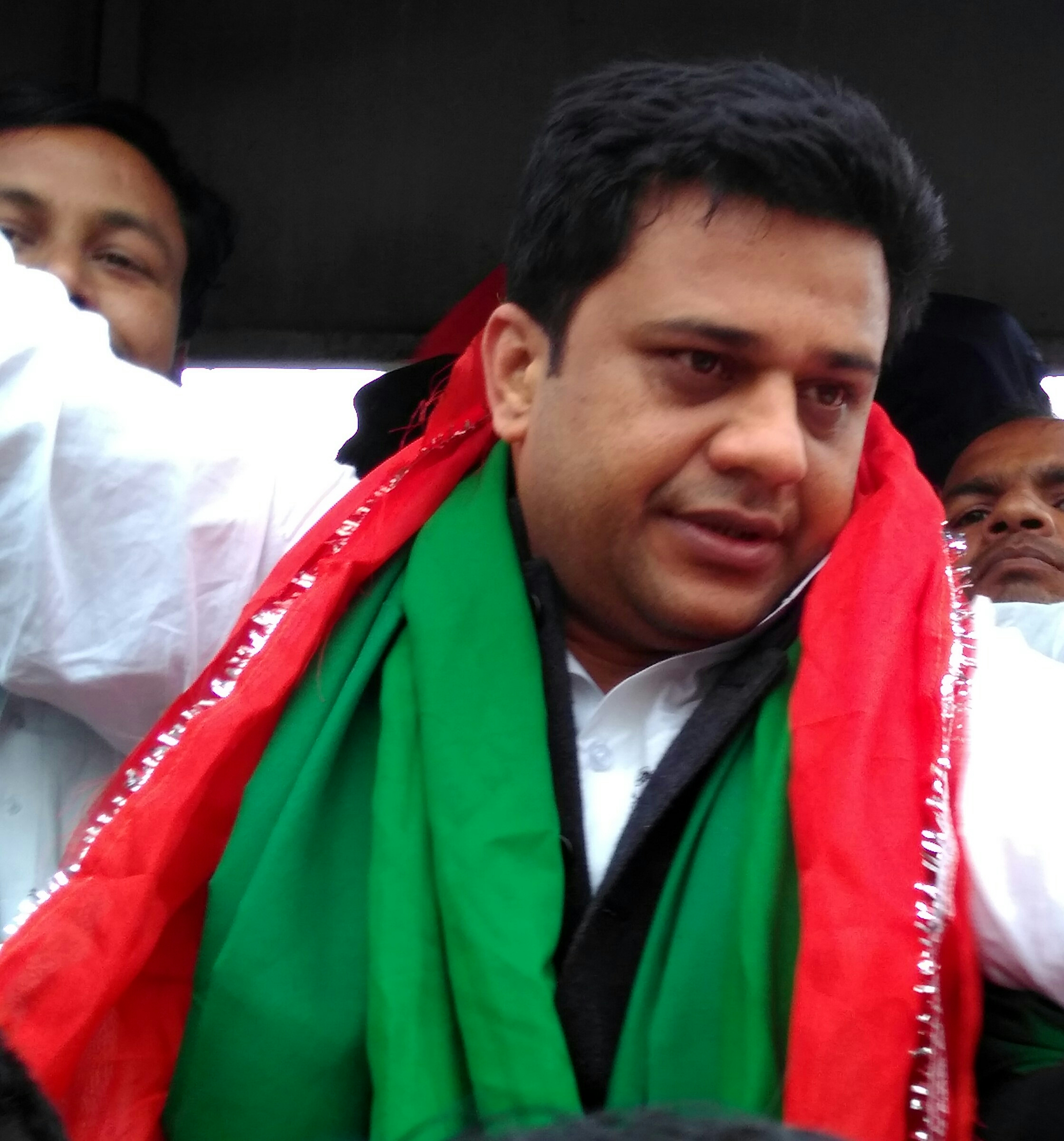

MLA, Legislative Assembly of Uttar Pradesh
- In office 8 March 2012 – 10 March 2022
- Preceded by: Constituency created
- Succeeded by: Mariya Shah
- Constituency: Matera

Minister of State (Independent Charge), Energy
- In office October 2015 – September 2016

Minister of Transport (Independent Charge)
- In office September 2016 – March 2017

Personal details
- Born: 22 May 1977 (age 49) Bahraich, Uttar Pradesh, India
- Citizenship: Indian
- Party: Samajwadi Party
- Spouse: Mariya Shah (m. 2015)
- Children: 1 son and 2 daughters
- Parent(s): Waqar Ahmad Shah; Rubab Sayda
- Education: Aligarh Muslim University; Dr. A.P.J. Abdul Kalam Technical University (MBA, 2002)
- Occupation: Politician
- Profession: Politician
- Website: Official website

Yasar Shah (born 22 May 1977) is an Indian politician and a former cabinet minister in the Government of Uttar Pradesh. He represented the Matera constituency in both the 16th Uttar Pradesh Assembly (2012–2017) and the 17th Uttar Pradesh Assembly (2017–2022) as a member of the Samajwadi Party. He is the son of late cabinet minister Waqar Ahmad Shah and former MP Rubab Sayda.

== Early life, family and education ==
Yasar Shah was born on 22 May 1977 in Kazipura, Bahraich, Uttar Pradesh. His father, Waqar Ahmad Shah, was a senior Samajwadi Party leader, five-time MLA, former Deputy Speaker, and a state minister. He died in April 2018 after prolonged illness. His mother, Rubab Sayda, served as Member of Parliament from Bahraich.

He completed his intermediate studies from Seventh-Day Adventist Inter College in Bahraich, pursued undergraduate studies at Aligarh Muslim University, and earned an MBA degree in 2002 from Babu Banarasi Das Institute, affiliated with Lucknow Technical University (now Dr. A.P.J. Abdul Kalam Technical University).

== Political career ==
Shah began his political journey in 2005 when he won the Bahraich district panchayat election with the highest number of votes. In 2012, he was elected to the Uttar Pradesh Legislative Assembly from the newly created Matera constituency as a Samajwadi Party candidate, defeating Indian National Congress’s Ali Akabar by a margin of 2,801 votes.

In 2013, he was nominated to contest the Shravasti Lok Sabha seat by the Samajwadi Party.

He was re-elected from Matera in the 2017 Uttar Pradesh Legislative Assembly election in a closely contested race, defeating Bharatiya Janata Party's Arun Veer Singh by a margin of 1,595 votes. Shah received 79,188 votes (40.0%), while Singh got 77,593 votes (39.2%). Bahujan Samaj Party’s Sultan Ahmad Khan secured 33,482 votes (16.9%). Together, the top three candidates accounted for 96.1% of the total votes.

In 2012, he had declared assets worth ₹1.31 crore and one criminal case. By 2017, his declared assets rose to over ₹7.16 crore, with no criminal cases. By 2022, he declared assets worth more than ₹13.35 crore.

Following his father’s critical illness, Shah was inducted into the Uttar Pradesh cabinet in 2014 as Minister of State, replacing Waqar Ahmad Shah in the Labour Ministry.

Later, in October 2015, he was promoted to Minister of State (Independent Charge) for Energy and subsequently became the Transport Minister (Independent Charge) in the Akhilesh Yadav cabinet.

== Legislative achievements ==
During his tenure as Energy and later Transport Minister, Shah oversaw multiple development projects, including the replacement of overhead power lines with underground lines in Bahraich, construction of a ₹20 crore trauma center, and establishment of 22 power substations.

As Transport Minister, he implemented reforms in public transport, introducing Volvo and Scania buses on key intercity routes. He also initiated the renovation of bus terminals in Bahraich and Lucknow.

== Personal life ==
Shah married Mariya Shah on 14 July 2015. The couple has one son and two daughters. He lists his profession as agriculturist and businessman. He resides in Kazipura, Bahraich, near the India–Nepal border.

He is often referred to as “Yasar Bhai” among locals and is known for his accessibility and involvement in local issues.

== Public statements and political views ==
Shah has voiced opposition to decisions by the state government that, according to him, negatively impact communal harmony, such as the denial of permission to the historic Ghazi Mian fair in Bahraich.

In November 2017, during a municipal election campaign in Bahraich, Yasar Shah stated that the same city from where Prime Minister Narendra Modi began his parliamentary journey would also witness the political downfall of the Bharatiya Janata Party (BJP). He accused the BJP of promoting divisive politics and emphasized Bahraich's legacy of communal harmony.

In February 2024, he criticized Samajwadi Party rebels who voted for BJP candidates in Rajya Sabha elections.

In September 2024, Shah was granted interim protection from arrest by the Lucknow Bench of the Allahabad High Court in a case related to a fake social media post alleging a police recruitment exam paper leak. The FIR, registered on 22 August 2024 at Lucknow's Husainganj police station, accused several individuals of spreading misinformation and demanding money from candidates. The court observed that Shah’s involvement was limited to a single tweet, which may have been objectionable, but emphasized the constitutional protection of free expression. He was cautioned to exercise restraint in future social media activity.
