= Zafar Mahmud =

- ظفر محمود
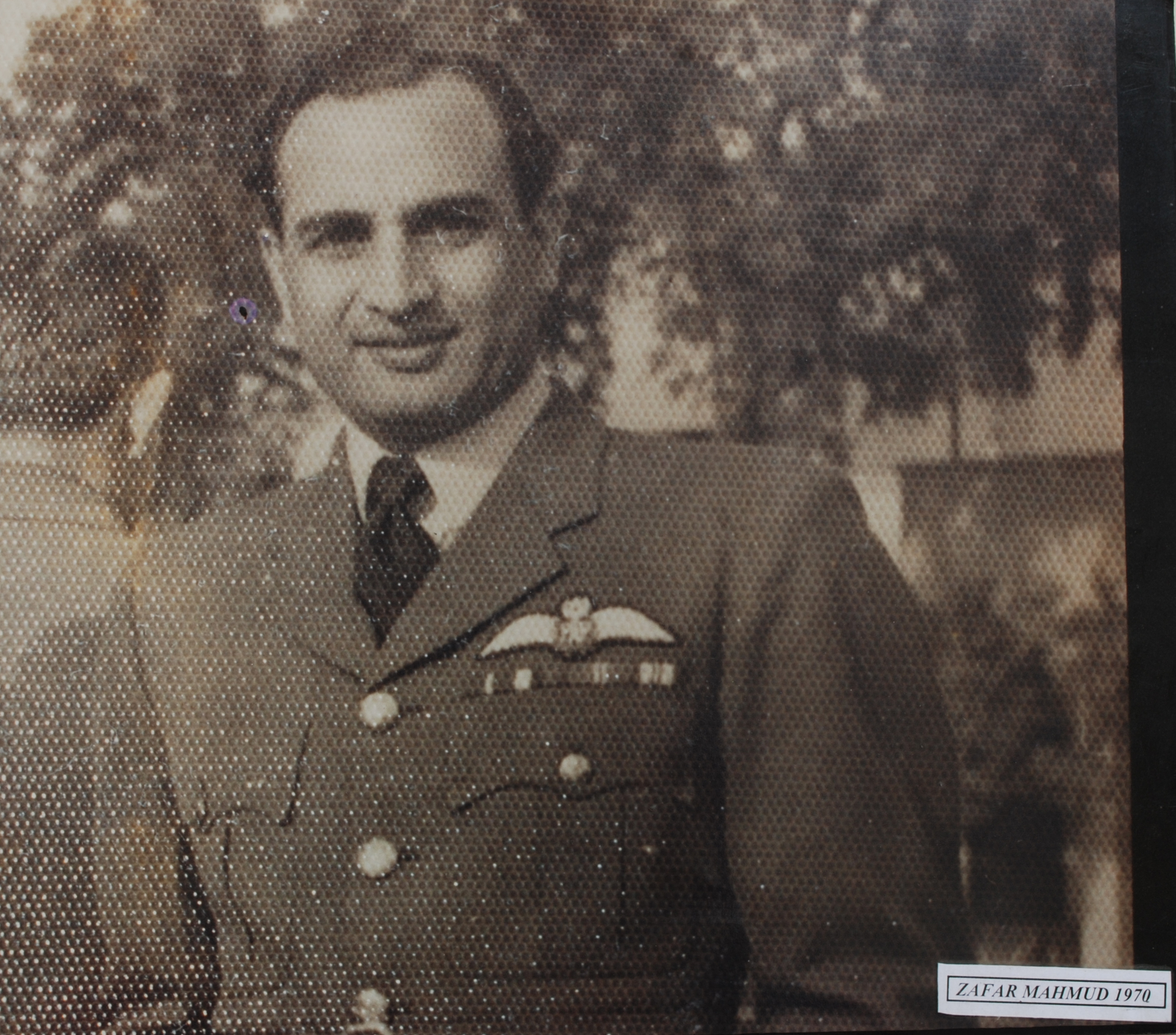

Personal details
- Born: 4 December 1923
- Died: 20 March 2016 Lahore, Pakistan
- Occupation: Royal Indian Air Force (1945–1947); Pakistan Air Force (1947–1973); Diplomat (1974–1985)

Military service
- Years of service: 1944-1973
- Rank: Air commodore

Zafar Mahmud (Urdu: ظفر محمود; 4 December 1923 – 29 March 2016) was a Royal Indian Air Force officer, then an officer in the Pakistan Air Force, and later became a member of the Pakistan foreign service as an ambassador.

In the 1950s, as part of his military career, Zafar traveled to the U.S. to observe United States Air Force trainings. In 1956, he held the rank of Wing Commander.

Zafar may have represented the Pakistan Air Force's interests in the Hamood-ur-Rahman commission that was created by the Zulfiqar Ali Bhutto following the Indo-Pakistani War of 1971 and the breakup of the country into Pakistan and Bangladesh.

In 1975, Zafar joined the Foreign Service of Pakistan and served as the country's ambassador to Somalia, and Poland before retiring in 1985.

He died due to medical complications at the Combined Military Hospital Lahore on Sunday, 20 March 2016 and was buried the same day next to his wife, Najma Mahmud, who died in 1992. Survivors include his son, daughter, as well as seven grandchildren.
