= Anand Kumar Gond =

Indian politician

Member of Parliament, Lok Sabha
- Incumbent
- Assumed office 4 June 2024
- Preceded by: Akshaibar Lal
- Constituency: Bahraich

Personal details
- Party: Bharatiya Janata Party
- Parent: Akshaibar Lal (father)
- Occupation: Politician; Businessman

Anand Kumar is an Indian politician and currently serving as the member of the Member of Parliament, Lok Sabha from Bahraich Lok Sabha constituency. He is a member of the Bharatiya Janata Party.

== Political career ==
In the following 2024 Indian general election; Anand Kumar Gond of Bharatiya Janata Party defeated Samajwadi Party's candidate Ramesh Chandra Gautam by margin of 64227 Votes.

== See also ==
- 18th Lok Sabha
- Bharatiya Janata Party
- Bahraich Lok Sabha constituency
