= Rajdhani, Gorakhpur =

Village in Uttar Pradesh, India

Rajdhani is a village in Gorakhpur, situated 35 km from Gorakhpur railway station, Uttar Pradesh. This village is situated near the bank of the Rapti River, which is a tributary of the Ganges. Most of the people in the village are farmers. There is small ashram called Sirsiya Baba ka Sthaan, where the people of Rajdhani and adjacent villages come to listen to Kathas (spiritual stories) and to pray.

The Bhojpuri language is mother tongue of the residents of this village. As entertainment, people enjoy Bhojpuri folk songs, Biraha, Nautanki following their old traditions. Durgapuja is a very popular festival and is celebrated with worship of the goddess Maa Durga for nine days.

The village has experienced floods many times. The 1998 and 2001 floods from the Rapti River were the worst.
