= Rubab =

Rubab may refer to:

- Rubab (instrument), a lute-like musical instrument
  - Pamiri rubab, a fretless six-strung lute of Tajikistan
  - Seni rebab, plucked string instrument of northern India
- Rubaab, 2026 Indian film
- Rubab bint Imra al-Qais, wife of Husayn ibn ‘Alī
- Rubab Raza (born 1991), Pakistani Olympic swimmer
- Rubab Sayda (born 1950), Indian politician
- Meera (Pakistani actress), Irtiza Rubab (born 1976), Pakistani film actress

== See also ==
- Robab Farahi-Mahdavieh
