= Bahraich =

- City
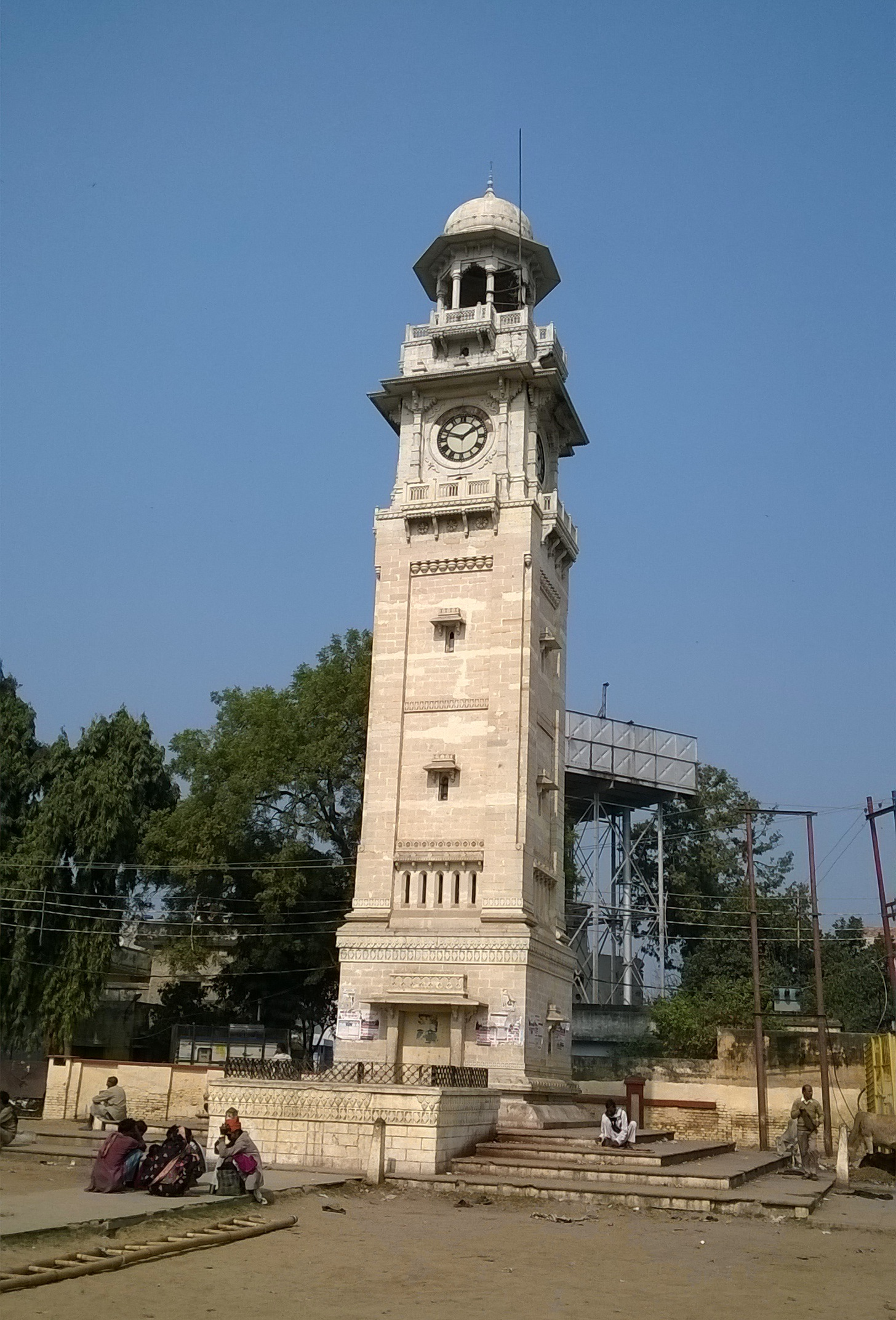
- Bahraich Clock Tower

- Location in Uttar Pradesh, India Bahraich (India)
- Coordinates: 27.575°N 81.594°E
- Country: India
- State: Uttar Pradesh
- District: Bahraich

Government
  - Body: Bahraich Nagar Palika Parishad
  - Mayor: Sudha Tekriwal
  - MLA: Anupama Jaiswal (BJP)
  - MP: Anand Kumar Gond (BJP) and Karan Bhushan Singh (BJP)

Area
  - Total: 34 km^{2} (13 sq mi)
- Elevation: 126 m (413 ft)

Population (2011)
  - Total: 186,223
  - Density: 5,500/km^{2} (14,000/sq mi)

Language
  - Official: Hindi
  - Additional official: Urdu
- Time zone: UTC+5:30 (IST)
- PIN: 271801
- Telephone code: +91 05252
- Vehicle registration: UP-40
- Sex Ratio: 892 ♂/♀
- Website: bahraichnpp.in

Bahraich is a city and a municipal board in Bahraich district in the state of Uttar Pradesh, India. Located on the Saryu River, a tributary of the Ghaghara river, Bahraich is 125 kilometres (78 miles) north-east of Lucknow, the state capital. The districts of Barabanki, Gonda, Balrampur, Lakhimpur Kheri, Shravasti and Sitapur share boundaries with Bahraich. A factor which makes this city important is the international border shared with Nepal.

== Geography and climate ==
Bahraich has an average elevation of 126 metres (413 feet). Bahraich has a warm humid subtropical climate with hot summers from April to July. The rainy season is from July to mid-September when Bahraich gets an average rainfall from the south-west monsoon winds, and occasionally frontal rainfall will occur in January. In winter the maximum temperature is around 25 °C (77 °F) and the minimum is in the −1 to 7 °C (30 to 45 °F) range. Fog is quite common from late December to late January. Summers are extremely hot with temperatures rising to the 40 to 47 °C (104 to 117 °F) range, the average highs being in the high of 30s (degree Celsius). Average annual rainfall is 1,900 centimetres (750 inches) (approx).

Climate data for Bahraich (1991–2020, extremes 1901–2020)
Month	Jan	Feb	Mar	Apr	May	Jun	Jul	Aug	Sep	Oct	Nov	Dec	Year
Record high °C (°F)	29.1 (84.4)	35.2 (95.4)	41.0 (105.8)	44.6 (112.3)	45.8 (114.4)	47.6 (117.7)	44.4 (111.9)	39.2 (102.6)	39.4 (102.9)	38.6 (101.5)	35.2 (95.4)	31.7 (89.1)	47.6 (117.7)
Mean daily maximum °C (°F)	20.4 (68.7)	26.0 (78.8)	32.0 (89.6)	37.2 (99.0)	38.2 (100.8)	36.8 (98.2)	33.4 (92.1)	32.9 (91.2)	32.9 (91.2)	32.3 (90.1)	28.7 (83.7)	23.1 (73.6)	31.2 (88.2)
Mean daily minimum °C (°F)	8.8 (47.8)	12.2 (54.0)	16.5 (61.7)	21.8 (71.2)	25.2 (77.4)	26.6 (79.9)	26.4 (79.5)	26.1 (79.0)	25.1 (77.2)	20.9 (69.6)	15.2 (59.4)	10.5 (50.9)	19.5 (67.1)
Record low °C (°F)	0.3 (32.5)	0.6 (33.1)	5.6 (42.1)	11.1 (52.0)	13.5 (56.3)	18.3 (64.9)	18.7 (65.7)	21.1 (70.0)	18.3 (64.9)	12.2 (54.0)	5.0 (41.0)	0.2 (32.4)	0.2 (32.4)
Average rainfall mm (inches)	21.1 (0.83)	24.4 (0.96)	10.3 (0.41)	13.9 (0.55)	53.3 (2.10)	180.8 (7.12)	347.7 (13.69)	297.3 (11.70)	193.6 (7.62)	46.7 (1.84)	3.1 (0.12)	6.4 (0.25)	1,198.6 (47.19)
Average rainy days	1.5	1.9	1.1	1.1	3.1	7.1	12.3	12.3	7.7	1.7	0.2	0.4	50.4
Average relative humidity (%) (at 17:30 IST)	71	57	40	30	38	53	72	76	74	65	65	72	59
Source: India Meteorological Department

== Demographics ==
As of 2011 Indian Census, Bahraich had a total population of 186,223, of which 97,653 were males and 88,570 were females. Population within the age group of 0 to 6 years was 24,097. The total number of literates in Bahraich was 119,564, which constituted 64.2% of the population with male literacy of 66.5% and female literacy of 61.7%. The effective literacy rate of 7+ population of Bahraich was 73.7%, of which male literacy rate was 76.4% and female literacy rate was 70.8%. The Scheduled Castes and Scheduled Tribes population was 9,584 and 170 respectively. Bahraich had 30460 households in 2011.

=== Religion ===
Religion in Bahraich city (2011 census)
Religion	Percent
Islam	56.07%
Hinduism	42.40%
Others	1.53%

Majority of the population of Bahraich are Muslims (56%), followed by Hindus (42%), with small populations of Sikhs, Jains, Christians and Buddhists.

== Politics ==
The city of Bahraich falls under the Bahraich Assembly constituency held by Anupama Jaiswal of BJP. It is part of the Bahraich Lok Sabha constituency held by Anand Kumar Gond of BJP.

== Transportation ==
=== Roads ===
Bahraich is well connected with other districts of Uttar Pradesh. UPSRTC and private operators provide road connectivity to Lucknow, Kanpur, Allahabad, Varanasi, Bareilly, Haridwar, Shimla, Delhi, Muradabad, Rampur, Ghaziabad, Shahajahanpur, Jaipur, Sitapur, Lakhimpur, Hardoi, Unnao, Balrampur, Gonda, Barabanki, Pratapgarh, Shimla, Mathura, Jhansi, Jaunpur, Gorakhpur, Basti, Varanasi, Shravasti and Agra. There are buses for Lucknow in every 15 minutes. National Highway 927 connects the city to Barabanki and state capital Lucknow.

=== Railways ===
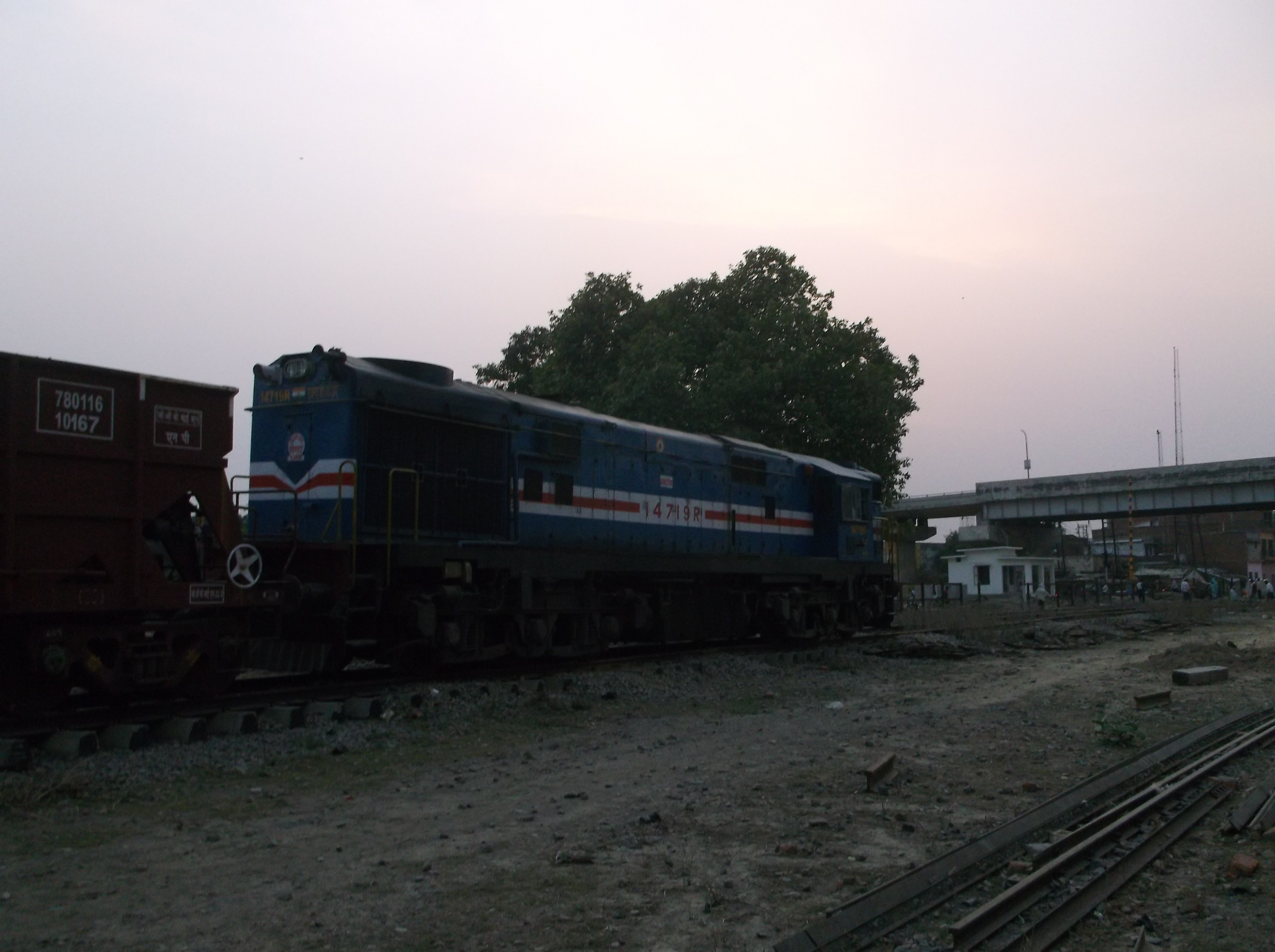
Broad Gauge train at Bahraich

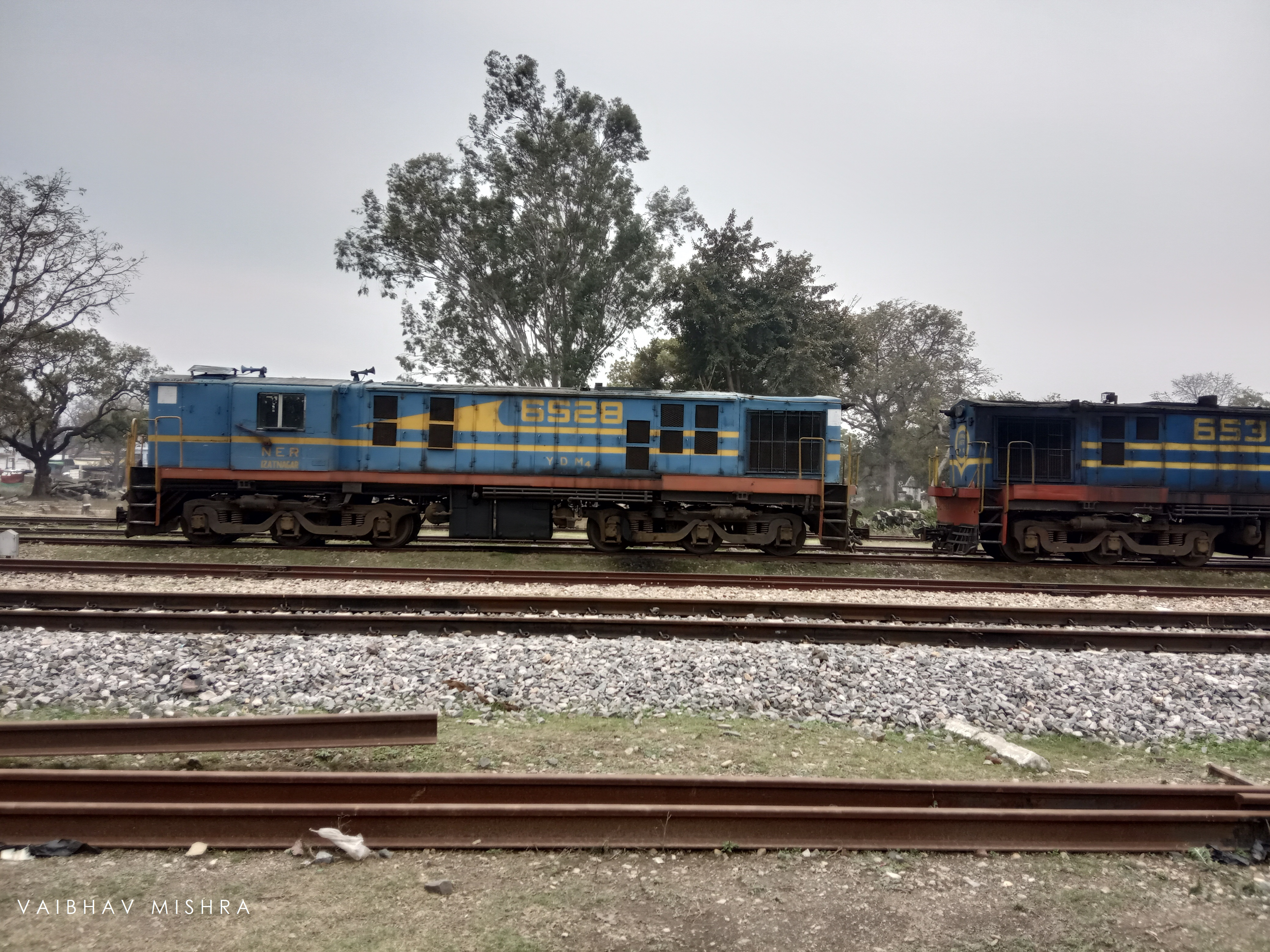
Metre gauge engine at bahraich meter gauge yard.

Bahraich railway station is a main railway station in Bahraich district, Uttar Pradesh. Its code is BRK. It serves Bahraich city. The station consists of 3 platforms, two for broad gauge and one for meter gauge. Bahraich to Jarwal Road is a Broad gauge station 55 kilometres (34 miles) from district headquarters and lies on Delhi–Barauni line. Plans for converting the Bahraich – Gonda tracks to broad-gauge have been in talks since October 2018. It is complete as of July 2020, but due to lack of electrification, only diesel locomotives are run in these tracks. According to the railway board, ₹327.32 crore is to be invested to electrify the whole Bahraich-Gonda-Balrampur-Gorakhpur line, with expected completion by the year 2021.

== October 2024 communal violence ==
In October 2024, Bahraich witnessed communal tensions during a Durga idol immersion procession. The violence was triggered by a disagreement over music being played out from loudspeakers while the procession was passing through the area. A Hindu youth, Ram Gopal Mishra, was reportedly shot 14 times, resulting in his death. The incident took place near a mosque, heightening religious tensions and prompting the suspension of internet services in the area. The violence led to public outrage and demands for justice. Some eyewitnesses from the Hindu community have alleged that stone-pelting initiated from a house belonging to a local Muslim resident, which they claim contributed to the escalation of violence. They assert that police response included lathi charges against them, which further inflamed tensions.

== Media ==
Bahraich has an All India Radio relay station known as Akashvani Bahraich. It broadcasts on FM frequencies @ 100.1.

== Notable people ==
- Syed Zafar Mahmood- Indian Civil-Servant and former 'Officer on Special Duty' for the Indian Prime Minister Manmohan Singh
- Tahir Mahmood – former Chairman, National Minorities Commission
- Mahfoozur Rahman Nami – Indian Muslim scholar, politician and an author
- Meena Shah - national badminton champion of India. recipient of the Padma Shri and the Arjuna award
- Waqar Ahmad Shah – former speaker of Uttar Pradesh Legislative Assembly and former cabinet minister in the Government of Uttar Pradesh
- Yasar Shah – Former cabinet minister in the Government of Uttar Pradesh
- Mohsin Zaidi – Urdu poet
