= Saroj Sonkar =

Indian politician

Member of the uttar Pradesh Legislative Assembly
- Incumbent
- Assumed office 2019
- Preceded by: Akshaibar Lal
- Constituency: Balha

Personal details
- Born: Uttar Pradesh
- Party: Bharatiya Janata Party(BJP)

Saroj Sonkar is an Indian politician from Bhartiya Janata Party. She won the Balha Assembly constituency in 2019 by-election and again in 2022.
