= Rubab Sayda =

Indian politician (1950–2024)

Member of Parliament, Lok Sabha
- In office 2004–2009
- Preceded by: Padamsen Chaudhary
- Succeeded by: Kamal Kishor
- Constituency: Bahraich

Personal details
- Born: 15 June 1950 Meerut, Uttar Pradesh, India
- Died: 6 February 2024 (aged 73) Aligarh, Uttar Pradesh, India
- Party: Samajwadi Party
- Spouse: Waqar Ahmad Shah
- Children: Yasar Shah and Dr. Alvira Shah
- Parents: Razaulhaq (father); Noorjahan (mother)
- Education: M.A., B.Ed.
- Alma mater: Meerut University
- As of 17 September, 2006

Rubab Sayda (15 June 1950 – 6 February 2024) was an Indian politician from Bahraich in Uttar Pradesh. Sayda was retired as Principal of Tara Girls Inter College. She was mother of Yasar Shah former Transport Minister (independent Charge) of Uttar Pradesh.

== Positions held ==
- 1995 President, Zila Panchyat Bahraich district
- 2004 Elected to 14th Lok Sabha and member of Committee on Industry
- 5 August 2007 Member of Committee on Information Technology

== Death ==
Rubab Sayda died on 6 February 2024 in Aligarh after short illness.

== See also ==
- Lok Sabha
- Waqar Ahmad Shah
- Akhilesh Yadav
- Yasar Shah
- Samajwadi Party
