= Tahir Mahmood =

Indian legal scholar

Professor Tahir Mahmood
- Born: 6 September 1941 (age 84); Lucknow, United Provinces, British India
- Occupation: Legal educator
- Relatives: Syed Zafar Mahmood (brother)

Tahir Mahmood is an Indian legal scholar and author of a large number of books frequently cited in the judgments of the Supreme Court of India and numerous High Courts. He had his higher legal education in Aligarh and London and has over fifty years of academic experience. Currently he is with Amity University where his designation is "Distinguished Jurist Chair, Professor of Eminence & Chairman, Institute of Advanced Legal Studies."

== Career ==
He has served as the Dean of the Faculty of Law in Delhi University (1992–95), Chairman of Government of India's National Commission for Minorities (1996–99), and Member of the Law Commission of India (2007–09).

His major interest areas have been religion-state relations, Islamic law and Indian family laws. He has authored over twenty books besides editing a large number of anthologies and new editions of some classic works. He launched two prestigious journals – the Islamic and Comparative Law Quarterly in 1981 and the Religion and Law Review in 1992. His major books are Laws of India on Religion and Religious Affairs (2008), Religion, Law and Society across the Globe (2013), Principles of Hindu Law: Personal Law of Hindus, Buddhists, Jains and Sikhs (2014), Reminiscing on Law Brains: Bench, Bar and Academia (2014), Minorities Commission 1978-2015: Minor Role in Major Affairs (2nd edition 2016) and Muslim Law in India and Abroad (2nd edition 2016). His thematic autobiography, Amid Gods and Lords: Living through Labyrinths of Religion and Law, was published in a second edition in 2015. He regularly writes for English and Urdu media.

He is a member of the advisory board of the Center for Law and Religion Studies at Brigham Young University (US), Steering Committee of the International Consortium of Law and Religion Studies at the University of Milan (Italy), and editorial board of the Journal of Muslim Minority Affairs (Jeddah-London).

== Awards and recognition ==
Shah Waliullah Award for Contemporary Understanding of Islamic Law (India 2009), Distinguished Academic Services Award (US, 2010).
