= Syed Zafar Mahmood =

Indian civil servant

- Born: 8 June 1951 (age 75)
- Education: Graduated from Aligarh Muslim University
- Occupations: Civil servant, Social activist
- Spouse: Nazira Mahmood
- Relatives: Tahir Mahmood (brother)

Syed Zafar Mahmood is an Indian civil-servant and former 'Officer on Special Duty' for Indian Prime Minister Manmohan Singh. On March 9, 2005, the Prime Minister appointed the 'Sachar Committee' to study the "social, economic and educational status" of India's minority Muslim community. Mahmood worked with the Sachar Committee to submit its report to the Government of India within two years on November 17, 2006. He has since given numerous talks in and outside India on the topic. In his presentations at Case Western Reserve University and Harvard University's John F. Kennedy School of Government he has commented on the steps forward to bridge the economic, social and educational divide of Indian Muslims.

During President George W. Bush's 2006 visit to India, the U.S. president convened an interfaith meeting in New Delhi and Mahmood was one of the representatives of Indian Muslims.

== Education ==
Mahmood was educated at Aligarh Muslim University where he earned B.Sc. (Honours) in Physics, M.S. in political science, and Ph.D. in Public Administration.

== Non-Governmental Work ==
Mahmood is also the founder of three non-profit organizations: Zakat Foundation of India, Interfaith Coalition for Peace and God's Grace Foundation.

Of note, Zakat Foundation of India (founded in 1997) is a non-profit which runs an orphanage for victims of the 2002 Gujarat riots in partnership with USA's One World Children's Fund. The Foundation recently was in the news for adopting the family of the late 11-year-old Shanno Khan. Mahmood's work in regard to these organizations has also been featured on CNN and America's National Public Radio (NPR). In September 2009, ZFI filed a 'Right To Information' application to question why the Government had rejected the Sachar Committee recommendations to ensure proper governance of Wakf properties.

On June 29, 2013, Mahmood was invited as a speaker to 'Young India Conclave' in Gandhinagar, Gujarat along with the state's Chief Minister Sri Narendra Modi. Mahmood challenged the Chief Minister on his poor records towards Muslims, highlighting anti-Muslim rhetoric on the BJP website, as well as policies that the BJP would need to adopt to appeal to Indian Muslim voters.
