= Bahraich district =

- District
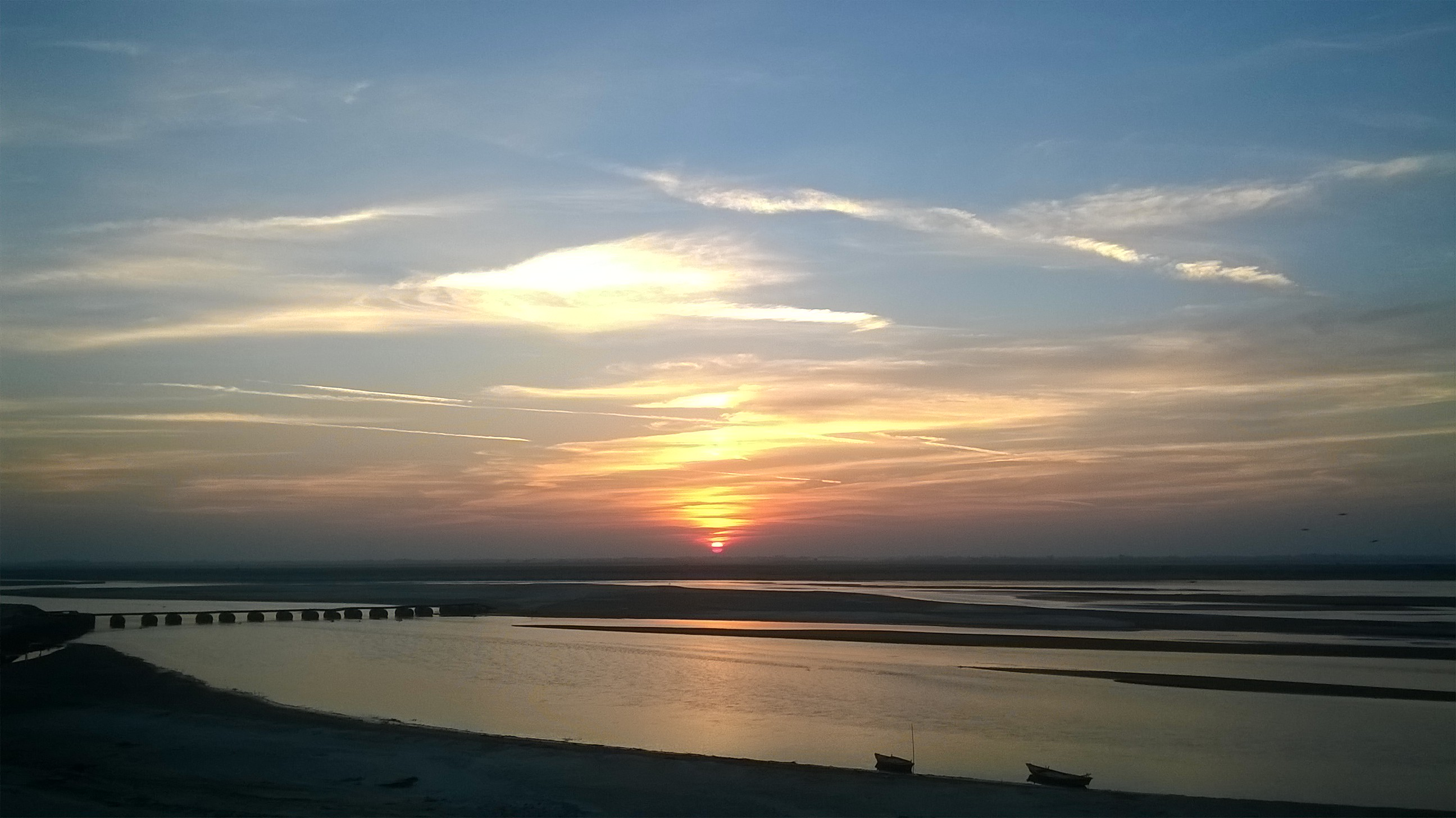
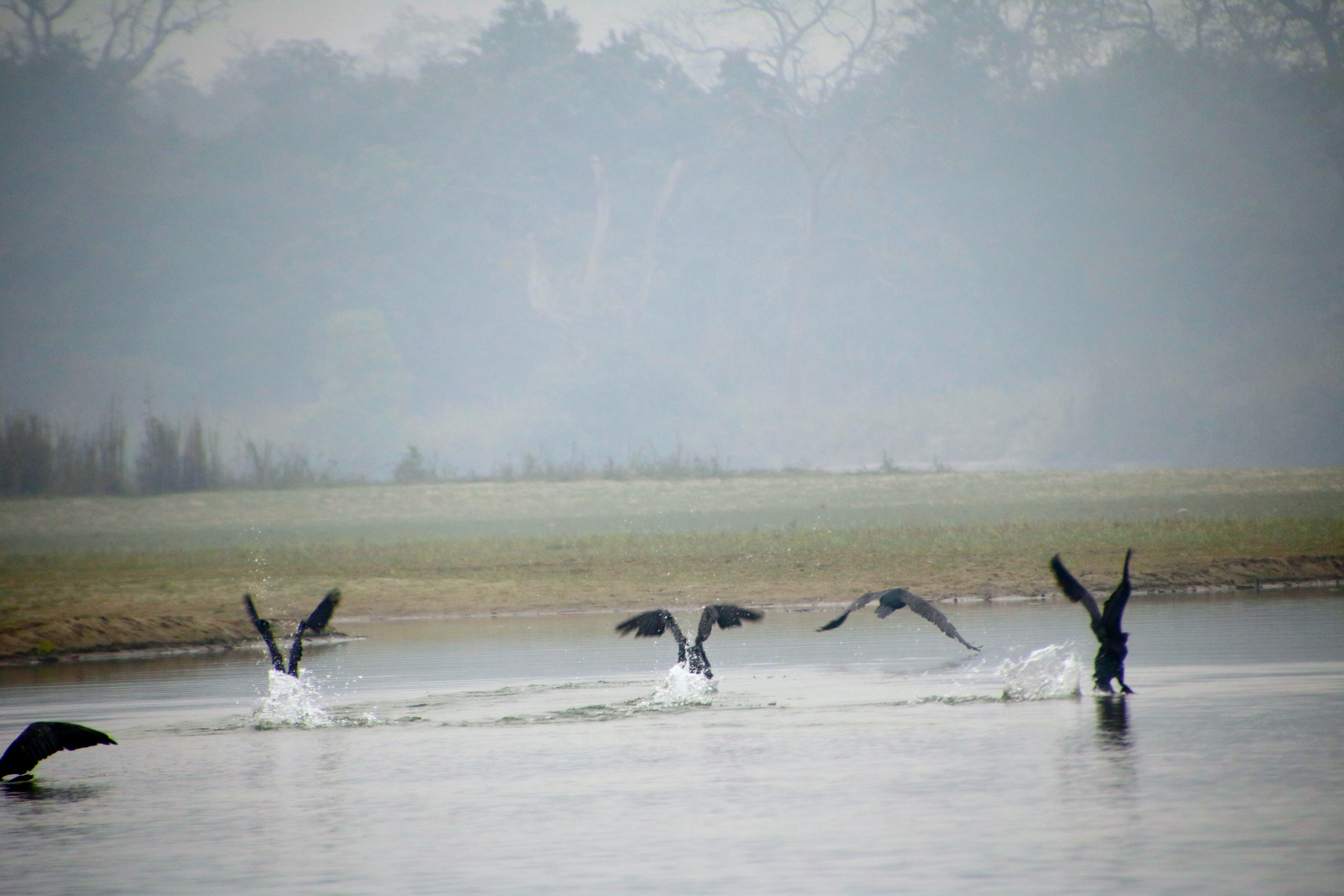
- Top: Ghaghara River in Bahraich district Bottom: Birds in Katarniaghat Wildlife Sanctuary

- Location of Bahraich district in Uttar Pradesh
- Country: India
- State: Uttar Pradesh
- Division: Devipatan
- Headquarters: Bahraich
- Tehsils: 6

Government
  - Lok Sabha constituencies: Bahraich, Kaiserganj

Area
  - Total: 4,696.8 km^{2} (1,813.4 sq mi)

Population (2011)
  - Total: 3,487,731
  - Density: 666/km^{2} (1,720/sq mi)
  - Urban: 186,223

Demographics
  - Literacy: 49.32 per cent
- Time zone: UTC+05:30 (IST)
- Major highways: NH28C, SH96
- Average annual precipitation: 1710 mm
- Website: bahraich.nic.in

Bahraich district is one of the districts of Uttar Pradesh state of India, and Bahraich town is the district headquarters. Bahraich District is a part of Devipatan Division.

== Geography ==
Bahraich is situated along the northern border of Uttar Pradesh. The northern part of the district lies in the Terai region, split between India and Nepal. The largest river in the district is the Ghaghra, which flows into the district from Nepal and forms the western border.

== Demographics ==
According to the 2011 census Bahraich district has a population of 3,487,731, This gives it a ranking of 89th in India (out of a total of 640). The district has a population density of 706 inhabitants per square kilometre (1,830/sq mi). Its population growth rate over the decade 2001–2011 was 29.11%. Bahraich has a sex ratio of 891 females for every 1000 males, and a literacy rate of 49.32%. 8.14% of the population lives in urban areas. Scheduled Castes and Scheduled Tribes made up 14.60% and 0.32% of the population respectively.

Bahraich is a category "A" district i.e. having socio-economic and basic amenities parameters below the national average.

Hindus are the majority population, but Muslims are a large minority. In urban areas Muslims are the majority. There are small populations of Sikhs, Christians and Buddhists in the district.

At the time of the 2011 Census of India, 89.36% of the population in the district spoke Hindi, 7.02% Urdu, 1.82% Awadhi and 1.49% Bhojpuri as their first language.

Historical population
Year	Pop.	±% p.a.
1901	764,477	—
1911	761,611	−0.04%
1921	774,317	+0.17%
1931	825,923	+0.65%
1941	901,675	+0.88%
1951	978,553	+0.82%
1961	1,098,695	+1.16%
1971	1,282,218	+1.56%
1981	1,672,410	+2.69%
1991	2,090,852	+2.26%
2001	2,701,478	+2.60%
2011	3,487,731	+2.59%

Religions in Bahraich district (2011)
Religion	Percent
Hinduism	65.71%
Islam	33.53%
Other or not stated	0.76%
Distribution of religions

Languages of Bahraich district (2011)
1. Hindi (89.4%)
2. Urdu (7.02%)
3. Awadhi (1.82%)
4. Bhojpuri (1.49%)
5. Others (0.31%)

== Administration ==
=== Tehsils ===
Bahraich district comprises 6 tehsils or sub-divisions, each headed by a Sub-Divisional Magistrate (SDM):

1. Bahraich
2. Kaisarganj
3. Nanpara
4. Payagpur
5. Motipur (Mihinpurwa)
6. Mahasi

=== Blocks ===
Bahraich district comprises 14 blocks.

1. Hujurpur
2. Mahasi
3. Pakharpur
4. Chittaura
5. Mihinpurwa
6. Shivpur
7. Risia
8. Visheshwarganj
9. Jarwal
10. Nawabganj
11. Tejwapur
12. Kaisarganj
13. Balha
14. Payagpur
