= Chak =

Chak or CHAK may refer to:

== Synonym ==
- Chak (village), synonym for canal Irrigated villages in India and Pakistan that were built during the British Raj

== Places in India ==
- Chak Bahmanian, a village in India
- Chak Bilgan, a village in India
- Chak Des Raj, a village in India
- Chak Guru, a village in India
- Chak Mai Dass, a village in India
- Chak village a village in Bahraich district, India

== Places in Iran ==
- Chak, Gilan, a village in Iran
- Chak, South Khorasan, a village in Iran

== Places in Pakistan ==
- Chak Amru, a town in Pakistan
- Chak Beli Khan, a town in Pakistan
- Chak Jhumra, a city in Pakistan
- Chak, Punjab, a village in Sahiwal District, Pakistan
- Chak, Sindh, a town in Shikarpur District, Pakistan
- Chakwal, a city in Pakistan

== Entertainment and media ==
- CHAK (AM), a radio station (860 AM) licensed to Inuvik, Northwest Territories, Canada
- CHAK-TV, a television station (channel 6) licensed to Inuvik, Northwest Territories, Canada

== Other ==
- Chak dynasty of Kashmir.
- Chak people of Bangladesh
- Zhai (Chak in Cantonese), a Chinese surname

== See also ==
- Chacmool
