= Chak (village) =

Punjabi land revenue settlement

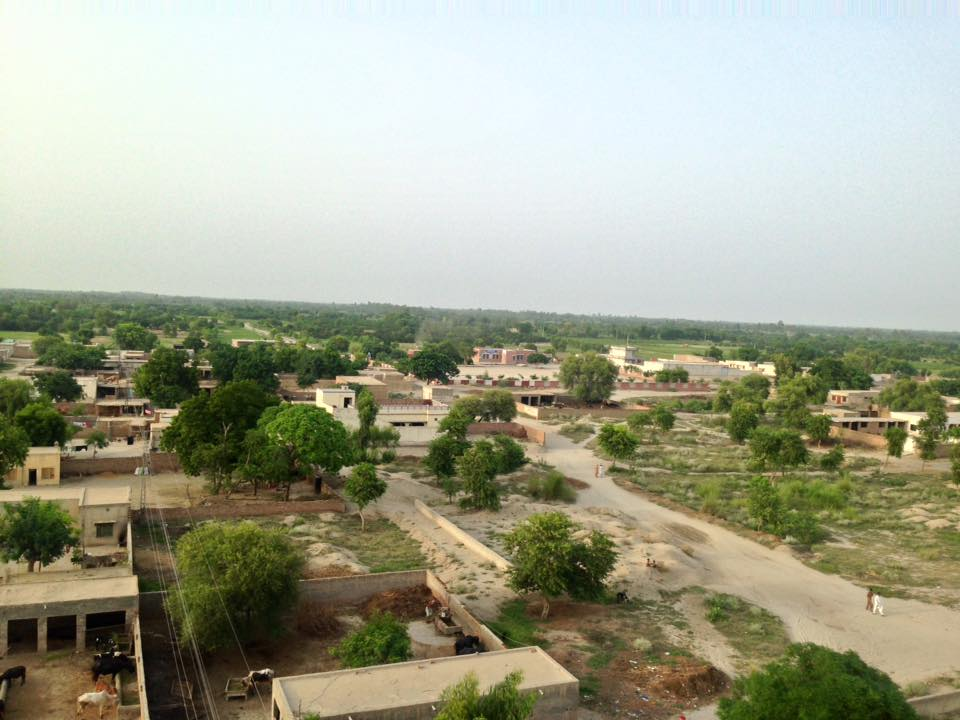
Chak 100 ML, aerial view

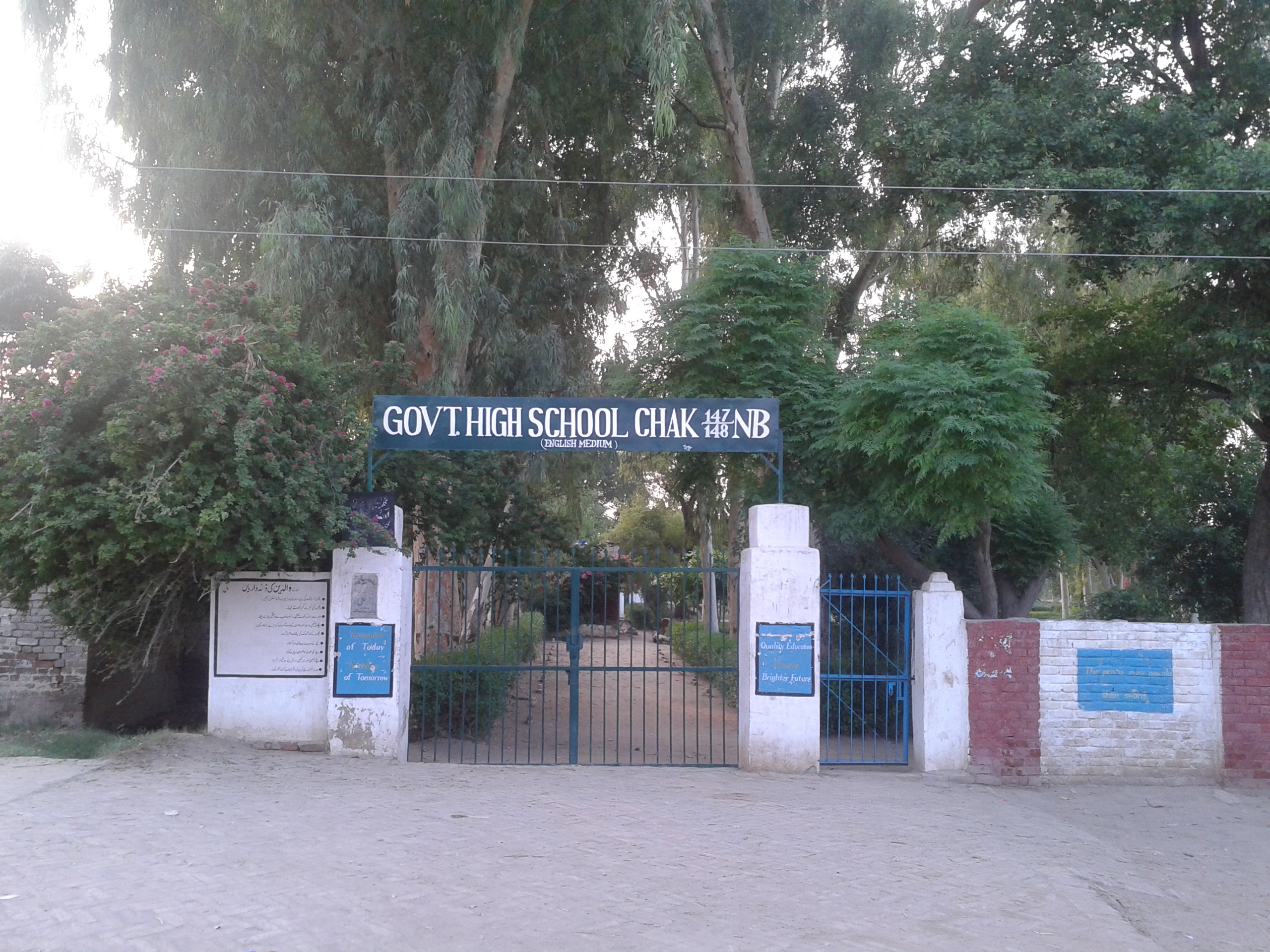
Chak147/148NB, school entrance.

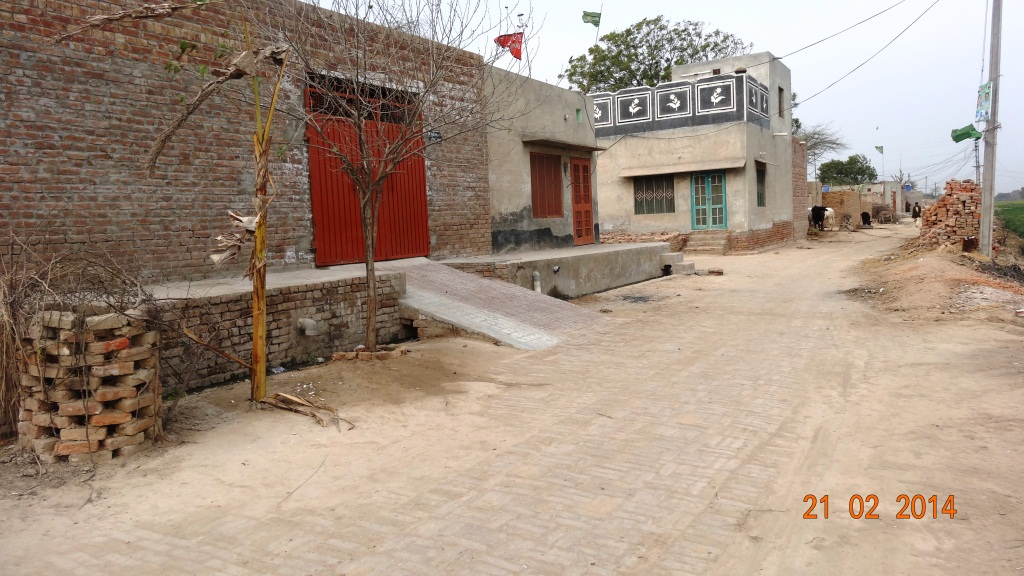
Chak 285 GB, view of a street.

Chak (Punjabi: چک) is the land revenue settlement/assessment circle marking a contiguous block of land. The word Chak comes from Chakar referring to a wheel in Punjabi, specifically a wheel associated with a water well. Historically there was one water well allotted per village and every village number allotted as per water-well wheel. Now the individual chak circles have come to be associated with the name of the village founded within the revenue circle. Chak circles are based on the British Raj era revenue collection system. To enhance the government revenue during the British Raj, new canals were built to bring the barani (rainfed) areas under cultivation by introducing the irrigation to the bangar (upland) areas of Punjab region. Block of contiguous land irrigated by the specific Rajwaha (artificial water channel) were given a unique chak number each. The migrant farmers were brought in to settle those newly irrigated areas around the core of new villages [which started out as dhanis]. Those new villages were called by the same name as their corresponding irrigation circle chak number. The government left it to those residents to give "chaks" a proper village name later. In due time, the term "chak" became synonymous with the term "village". In Punjab, the Chaks were the Punjab Canal Colonies which were given a number. Earlier their equivalent subdivisions used to be the Subah or Taraf, Pargana or Mahal, Mauza or Pir system, which was replaced by the administrative divisions of India after the partition of India in 1947, though the Chak as name of villages still continues in the former Punjab Canal Colonies.

Chaks are found mainly in the bagar tract on the tri-junction of Haryana, Rajasthan and Punjab region. Chak, the administrative revenue assessment circle or division, is also called the Chakla, which is not to be confused with the other types of Chaklas.

== Nomenclature ==
The villages are named using a four-part British colonial era nomenclature: "Chak (number) (letters) (village name)". Variations exist but usually names of chak have four parts,

1. "Chak" prefix,
2. Number, a unique number for each village,
3. Letter, one or two letter which correspond to the code given to the specific source of water, such as the Rajwaha (irrigation channel),
4. Village name, settlements usually started out as the small dhanis which later evolved into the villages. The name of a settlement is usually based on the name of a village's founding chowdhury, gotra or jathera.

Examples of four-part nomenclature are "Chak 106 JB Khichian" (JB denotes Jhang Branch canal), "Chak 445 GB Thaggan Wali" (GB denotes Gogera Branch canal), "Chak 354/WB Dunyapur", and Chak 236 GB Kilanwala (GB denotes Gugera Branch canal).

Examples of chak names with first three components of the four-part nomenclature are Chak 152 P (P denotes the Panjnad River from which they draw water), Chak 128 NB (NB denotes North Branch canal) and Chak 21 MB.

Examples of chak names with first two components of the four-part nomenclature are Chak No. 22.

Examples of chak names which now retain only the name of village are Chak Bahmanian (named after Brahmin caste, Chak Des Raj (named after the founder), Chak Mai Dass (named after the founder), Chak Bilgan, Chak Guru, etc.

Chak is also a village in Danta Ramgarh Tehsil of the Sikar district in Rajasthan, mainly populated by Pandits and Purohits.

== Chakbandi ==
Chak Bandi in Urdu (چک بندی), in Hindi (चकबंदी) or Killa Bandi in Urdu (قلعہ بندی), in Hindi (किल्लाबंदी), in terms of land and revenue, is the process of land consolidation, and Revenue Settlement. Chak bandi and Settlement is done by the Settlement Officer with the help of patwaris, lambardars and earlier zaildar (now abolished). Chakbandi, in terms of irrigation, means that each chak is irrigated by a branch water-course, fed by a sluice channel in the bank of the main canal where the amount of water given to each chak (farm) owner is in proportion to the area of its chak. Block of contiguous land irrigated by the specific Rajwaha, also called irrigation circle, were given a unique chak number each. The Chak (चक) is also referred to as the Chakla (चकला), which is different from the Chakla-belan for making roti or the Chakla (brothel).

Land consolidation is a planned rationalisation, readjustment, rearrangement of land parcels and their ownership to improve the rural infrastructure and to implement the developmental and environmental policies (improving environmental sustainability and agriculture). For the Chakbandi, contour of village is surveyed, to determine the slope category and drainage profile of the village land in cordinal directions. The land is also evaluated based on its price and productivity. The land holdings of each farmer is consolidated in the standardised-sized "khet" (field plots of usually 1 acre each) and then redistributed to the landlords in proportion to their earlier fragmented land holding's price and productivity. Each chak must contain the same relative quantity of good, bad and indifferent soil. In some tarafs (sides of a tract), almost every alternate field belongs to a different one of the four or five mauzas (villages) contained in it. In others the pattis (fragmented portion of land) are apportioned in long strips of land belonging to each of the different mauzas, and then again subdivided on the same principle.

Permanent Settlement is the process of confirmation of landlord's property rights in the form of tenure or ownership and fixing a corresponding property tax to be paid by the landlords to the government, for using the public infrastructure, such as canal water for irrigation which results in higher crop yield.

Terms related to chakbandi in the measurement of land in Punjab are: Banjar, Jungle, Abadi, Shamlat, Gair Mumkin, Barani, Nahri, Chahi, Taal, Bigha, Doab, HALRIS, Khadir and Bangar, Khasra, Patwari, Shajra, Zaildar, etc.

== Warrabandi, bharai and jharai ==
"Wara" (वारा), a vernacular Haryanvi/Punjabi word for the Hindi word "bari" (बारी), simply means the "turn". Warabandi (वाराबंदी) means the rotational system of a weekly roaster for equitable distribution of irrigation water to the individual chak (field) of each farmer from a sluice outlet. Time allocated to each farmer to draw water from the sluice is proportional to the size of farmer's land holding. To optimise the system, once the wara of a farmer is over, the wara of next farmer in the sequence of contiguous land commences. Irrigators know their turn or wara in advance.

For the fair distribution of water, warrabandi takes into consideration Bharai and Jharai. Bharai (भराई) is the common pool time taken from the release of water from canal through sluice or upstream farmer and its arrival at the delivery point of the farmer whose wara has arrived. Jharai (झराई) is the common pool time (time it takes for the water to arrive) applicable to the tail-end (last) farmer on the sluice.

== See also ==
- Administrative divisions of India
- Barani, Nehri, Nalli
- Bagar tract
- Bhattiana
- Chak De! India
- Chakna for daru
- Deshwali dialect
- Dhani (settlement type)
- Doab
- Jangladesh
- Johad
- Khadir and Bangar
- Subah or Taraf, Pargana or Mahal, Mauza or Pir
- Punjab region
