= Thatha Hakiman =

Historic village in Pakistan

Thatha Hakiman is a historic village which is located in tehsil Sahiwal, district Sargodha, Pakistan. Its name after an elder Dhudhi figure named Rai Hakeem Dhudhi, who was son of Rai Phatta Dhudhi. According to oral legends this village was settled by him in 16th century AD. Historically it was part of the vast estate of chief Dhudhi family of Arar, before the numberdari was handed over to Rai Barkhardar Dhudhi by Nawab Haji Ghulam Muhammad Khan Dhudhi. The majority of people in this area are related to Agriculture Sector. The major crops of the areas are Sugarcane, Wheat, Rice, and citrus. The variety of citrus namely Kinno which is cultivated in the area is very popular in the world. Pakistan earns hefty foreign exchange from Kinno annually. Dhudhi clan has political influence in Union Councils of Azmat-Wala and Sajoka of the area. In District Sargodha, the people of Dhudhi cast are mostly residing in Sahiwal Tehsil, Tehsil Sargodha, Shahpur Tehsil and Sillanwali Tehsil. The most important villages of the district, where people of this tribe living are Thatha Hakiman, Azmat-Wala, Sajoka, Rubwa, Jahanawala, Sajoka, Arar, Shahwala, and Chitror.

Fish farming is another emerging sector of the village, Thatha Hakiman which can boost the living stander of the people if the government provides assistance in this regard. Fish farming has been started on hundreds of acres of barren land of the village. Dengue and other water-born diseases is a threat to local peoples due to accumulated water in fish farming pounds. One side the sector can be helpful in boosting the economy of the area while on the other side, it is also posing threat to peoples' health, which needed government urgent attention.

Livestock is another important sector of the area as the majority of people of low-income class depended on it. The sector also catering to the needs of milk and meat in the country. Lack of health facilities is making people victims to various dangerous diseases like Cancer, Hepatitis, Malaria and dengue.
