= Arar, Pakistan =

Pakistani village

Arar
- Village
- native_name = اراڑ
- Map showing location of Arar in Pakistan
- Coordinates: 31°51′51″N 72°26′13″E
- Country: Pakistan
- Province: Punjab
- District: Sargodha
- Tehsil: Sahiwal
- First settled: 1800s
- Settled by: Rai Haji Muhammad Baig Dhudy

Population (2018)
  - Total: 1,530
- Time zone: UTC+5 (PST)
- Calling code: 0092

Arar Shareef (Punjabi and Urdu:اراڑشریف) or simply as "Arar" ( coordinates:31°51'51"N 72°26'13"E 31.863365, 72.438867) is a historic village located in Sahiwal Tehsil, Sargodha, Pakistan. It is nearby to the town of Farooqa, which is a mandi and central business hub since the British times. It is about 49 km (30.4 mi), south from Sargodha city. Geographically it lies on a Jech Doab between Sillanwali and Sahiwal Tehsil, Sargodha. Currently, the population of Arar is more than 1,530 approximately. Though its colonies can altogether be a count of many thousands.

== History ==
Historically, this village consisted of few houses of farmers of Arar caste before Khan Bahadur Rai Haji Muhammad Baig, the chief of Dhudy Rajput tribe moved here from his ancestry town, in the 1800s. This village was made the center point of the Rai Baig's already existing vast farmland or "jagir". Rai Haji Baig was the grandson of Rai Ganda (a Punjabi Rajput prince during the late times of Mughal Empire). He was from the lineage of the first Sufi Saint of Subcontinent, Rajkumar Rai Chawla a.k.a. Hazrat Baba Haji Sher Dewan. This jageer or estate includes many villages and nearby towns including Jahanawala (Kot Amanullah & Kot Allahdad), Sajoka, Rabwa, Nava Lahore, Gandawala Khuh, Chak Ghulam Muhammad, and its colony, etc. Before the Partition of India, a huge number of Hindus and Sikhs peasants and traders also lived here. It has been the religious and political hub for more than a century now. Here, there is a famous shrine "Dargah" of 18th century Sufi saint, Mian Abdullah Dhudy, a.k.a. Baba Dulla. Every year Urs festival is held here in his remembrance. Hundreds of people from far away areas like Sindh pay their visits during this time. Another historical place and attraction is the "Bangla" built by the British Government during the 1890s. Primarily, it was built as an office and a resthouse for the high-ranking English officers. However, after 1947 has remained under the Punjab Irrigation Department. Furthermore, a well-reputed 'madrassa' or Islamic school is present here for decades. It was an inspiration from Molana Ahmed Ali Lahori, a renowned Islamic scholar of the subcontinent.

The dhudies have political dominance and are in majority over two union councils i.e. Sajooka and Azmatwala. Though they play an important role and influence the politics of the region at large. Arar has been serving as a status of 'Maouza' by Government of Pakistan. This town was also famous for the horses, which were kept by the chief Dhudy family. They included the horses for tent pegging polo, traditional horse dancing, and horse racing. The reign of Rai Haji Ghulam Muhammad Dhudy is considered to be the golden era of Arar estate. He was the grandson of Rai Haji Baig. As a network of paved roads, concrete canals, electricity, schools, modern agriculture machinery, modern farming techniques, jobs, and madrasas were established. He was a supporter and close ally to Quaid e Azam Muhammad Ali Jinnah and his All-India Muslim League. His father, Rai Haji Khuda Baksh was a prominent figure of his times and was well respected by the British Indian Government. Especially, He was regarded by the Governor Lord Malcolm Hailey, 1st Baron Hailey who laid the foundations of modern Sargodha City.

In 1986, Rai Haq Nawaz Dhudy established a sugar mill here by the name of Chishtia Sugar Mills (now SW Sugar Mills). Thus, creating huge employment scope for the locals and nearby population. He is the elder son of Rai Haji Amman Ullah and the grandson of Rai Haji Ghulam Muhammad Dhudy. Moreover, he is the current head and an influential figure of the district.

https://commons.m.wikimedia.org/w/index.php?title=File:Nawab_Rai_Khuda_Baksh_Dhudy.jpeg&oldid=1040241608

== Agriculture ==
The land is very rich for agriculture. A canal is passing nearby. Citrus (mainly Kinnow) and Sugarcane are the major crops grown here. Kinnow, being famous worldwide from this locality. Though wheat, cotton, bamboos, etc. are also cultivated. Thus, can be called a multi agricultural belt. Livestock farming is also a major part of the region. Cattle, sheep, goat, poultry, and many other birds are kept. A famous stud farm, owned by the Chief Dhudy family is also present here since decades. A trend of commercial fish farming can also be seen in recent years.

== See also ==
- Government of Pakistan
- British Raj
- Farooqa
- Sargodha District
- All-India Muslim League
- UrsDargah
- Partition of India
- Hindus
- Sikhs
- Sahiwal Tehsil, Sargodha
