= Sahiwal (disambiguation) =

Sahiwal is a city in Sahiwal District, Punjab, Pakistan.

Sahiwal may also refer to:

- Sahiwal Division, in Punjab, Pakistan
- Sahiwal District, in Sahiwal Division, Punjab, Pakistan
- Sahiwal Tehsil, a tehsil of Sahiwal District, Punjab, Pakistan
- Sahiwal, Sargodha, a city in Sargodha District, Punjab, Pakistan
- Sahiwal Tehsil, Sargodha, a tehsil of Sargodha District, Punjab, Pakistan
- Sahianwala, a village in Faisalabad District, Punjab, Pakistan
- Sahiwal cattle, a breed of Zebuine cattle originating from and named after Sahiwal District
