= Azmatwala =

Village in Punjab, Pakistan

Azmatwala عظمت والا
- Village
- Location in Punjab, Pakistan Azmatwala (Pakistan)
- Coordinates: 31°51′09.1″N 72°24′03.9″E
- Country: Pakistan
- Province: Punjab
- District: Sargodha
- Tehsil: Sahiwal
- Union council: Azmatwala

Population (2017)
  - Total: 701

Azmatwala (Urdu: عظمت والا) is a village and the seat of a union council in Sahiwal Tehsil of Sargodha District in the Punjab province of Pakistan. It is one of the 14 union councils that make up the tehsil.

== Demographics ==
At the 2017 Census of Pakistan, Azmatwala had a population of 701.
