= Chakla (disambiguation) =

Chakla may refer to:

- Chakla, an Indian kitchen utensil
- Chakla (brothel), name for brothel or bordello in the Indian-subcontinent
- Chakla (administrative division), such as the Kingdom of Chakla
- Chakla, an irrigated land revenue assessment circle in the Indian-subcontinent

== See also ==
- Chak (disambiguation)
- Chakra (disambiguation)
- Charla (name)
