= Chak 312 GB =

Village in Toba Tek Singh District in Punjab, Pakistan

Chak No 312 GB is a village located in Toba Tek Singh District in Punjab, Pakistan. It is located (30.817208°N 72.270969°E) near the Shorkot Cant Cantonment on Rafiqui, Toba Tek Singh Road. The area of the village is 100 acres. There are around 650 houses and the population of the village is about 3500.

The native language of the villagers is Punjabi. The main occupation for the people is agricultural. The village is home to professionals working in engineering, teaching and medical. The village has a school for boys and girls and has a facility of Electricity, Sui Gas, Water Supply, Hospital and CNG Station. Railway and Bus service is also available there. There is also a Patrolling Check Post and FASCO Grid Station.
