= Chak 128 NB =

Human settlement in Pakistan

- Village
- Location in Pakistan
- Coordinates: 31°50′10″N 72°29′45″E
- Country: Pakistan
- Province: Punjab
- District: Sargodha
- Tehsil: Sillanwali

Population (2017)
  - Total: 3,084
- Postal code: 40010

Chak 128 NB is a village situated in Sillanwali Tehsil of Sargodha District in Punjab, Pakistan. Its neighbouring villages are Chak 130 NB, Chak 125 NB, Chak 129 NB and Jahanawala. The village is in a mainly agricultural area. The nearest city is Sillanwali, which is also the Tehsil headquarters and location of the nearest police station.

== History ==
In the 19th Century, as part of a grand engineering programme of British Government of India, a huge network of irrigation canals were built to settle what was then a piece of scrubland known as the Kirana Bar. Villages were built along canals, and given systematic numbers. The name of the village results from being the 128th numbered village on the North (Shumali) Branch Canal.

== Tribes and clans ==
Most of the villagers are indigenous to the region, unlike other colony villages, where settlers were brought from other parts of the Punjab. The exception are a community of Mirpuris, originally from Azad Kashmir. The locals refer to them as Mangla Dami (builders of the Mangla Dam).

The rest of the population belongs to various Kirana Bar tribes, such as the Kalyar (Majority), Moand, Khichi, Khokhar etc., while laborers have settled from the adjoining areas of Jhang District. Many residents belong to the Muslim Shaikh community.

== Agriculture ==
The village relies primarily on agriculture, with the main crops being wheat, sugar cane, cotton, pulses, rice and citrus.

== Schools ==
The village has one primary school.
