= Ahli Kamboh =

Village in Sargodha District, Punjab, Pakistan

Ahli Kamboh آہلی کمبوہ
- Village
- Ahli kamboh
- Location in Pakistan
- Coordinates: 31°51′15″N 72°16′15″E
- Country: Pakistan
- Province: Punjab
- Sargodha: Sargodha
- Tehsil: Sahiwal
- Established: after indo pak separation

Population (2017 Pakistani census)
  - Total: 3,565
- Postal code: 40230

Ahli Kamboh is a village in Sahiwal Tehsil of Sargodha District in Punjab, Pakistan.

Population of the village per 2017 Pakistani census is 3,565 with 631 households.
