= Chak 129 =

Village in Punjab, Pakistan

Chak 129 NB (سادھ والا) Unatti Moar
- Village
- Saadh Wala
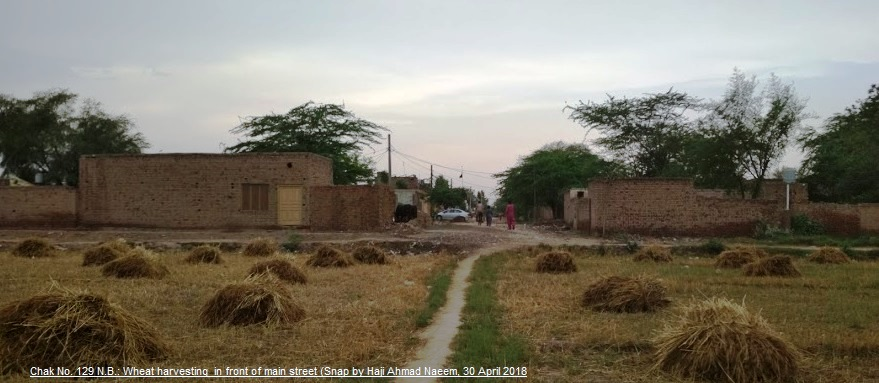
- Chak 129 N.B. (from Eastern side as on 30 April 2018, pic by Haji Ahmad Naeem)

- Location in Pakistan Chak 129 NB (Punjab, Pakistan)
- Coordinates: 31°49′15″N 72°30′55″E
- Country: Pakistan
- Province: Punjab, Pakistan
- District: Sargodha
- Tehsil: Sillanwali

Chak 129 NB (چک ۱۲۹ شمالی), commonly known as Unatti Moar, is a village in Tehsil Sillanwali, in Sargodha District of Punjab, Pakistan. It is located along the Sillanwali-Farooka Road, on the western side of the Lower Jheulm Canal.

== Access ==
It is easily accessible from major cities i.e. Sargodha, Chiniot, Faislabad, Jhang and Sahiwal via Sargodha Road, Farûka (فروکہ) Road, Bařana (بڑانہ) Road, Shah Nikđer (شاہ نکڈر) Road and a railway track (cf. Shorkot–Lalamusa Branch Line). The railway track was laid down by British Government in 1904.

== History & Settlement ==
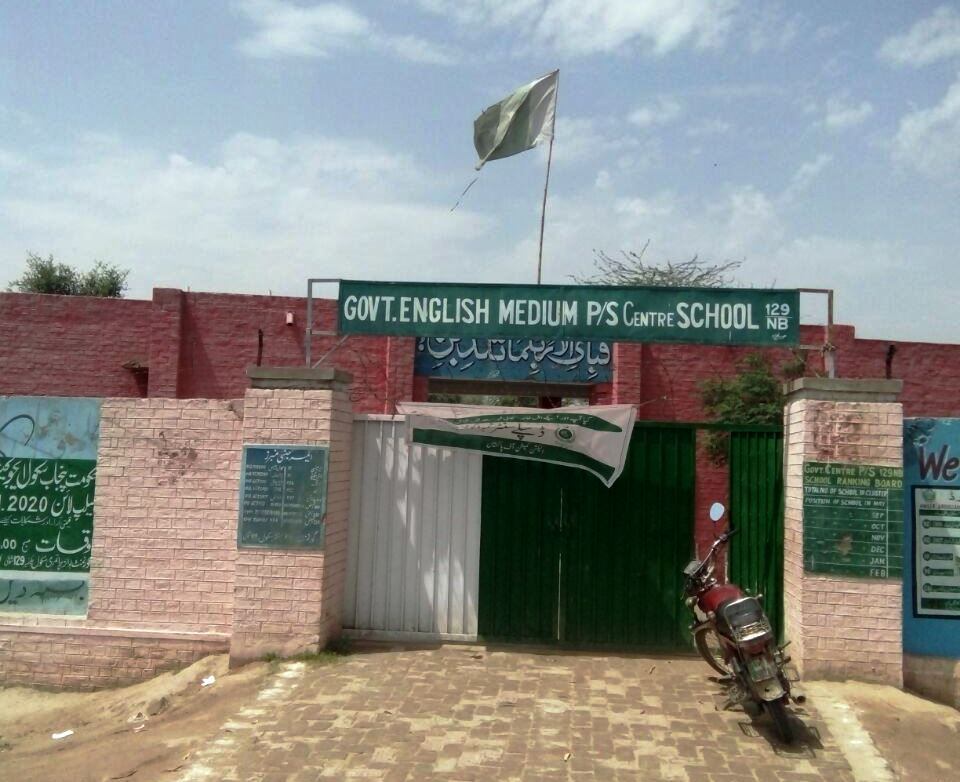
Govt. Primary School Chak No. 129 NB (Snap by Awais Abdullah)

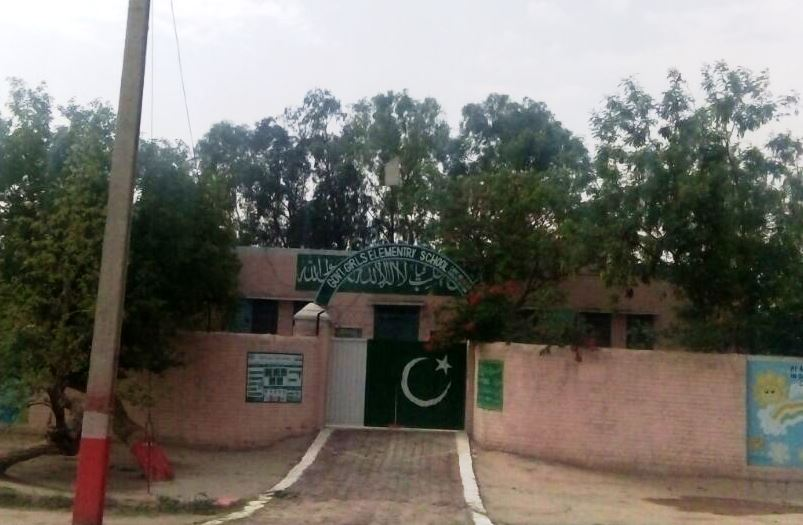
Govt. Girls High School Chak No. 129 NB (Snap by Awais Abdullah)

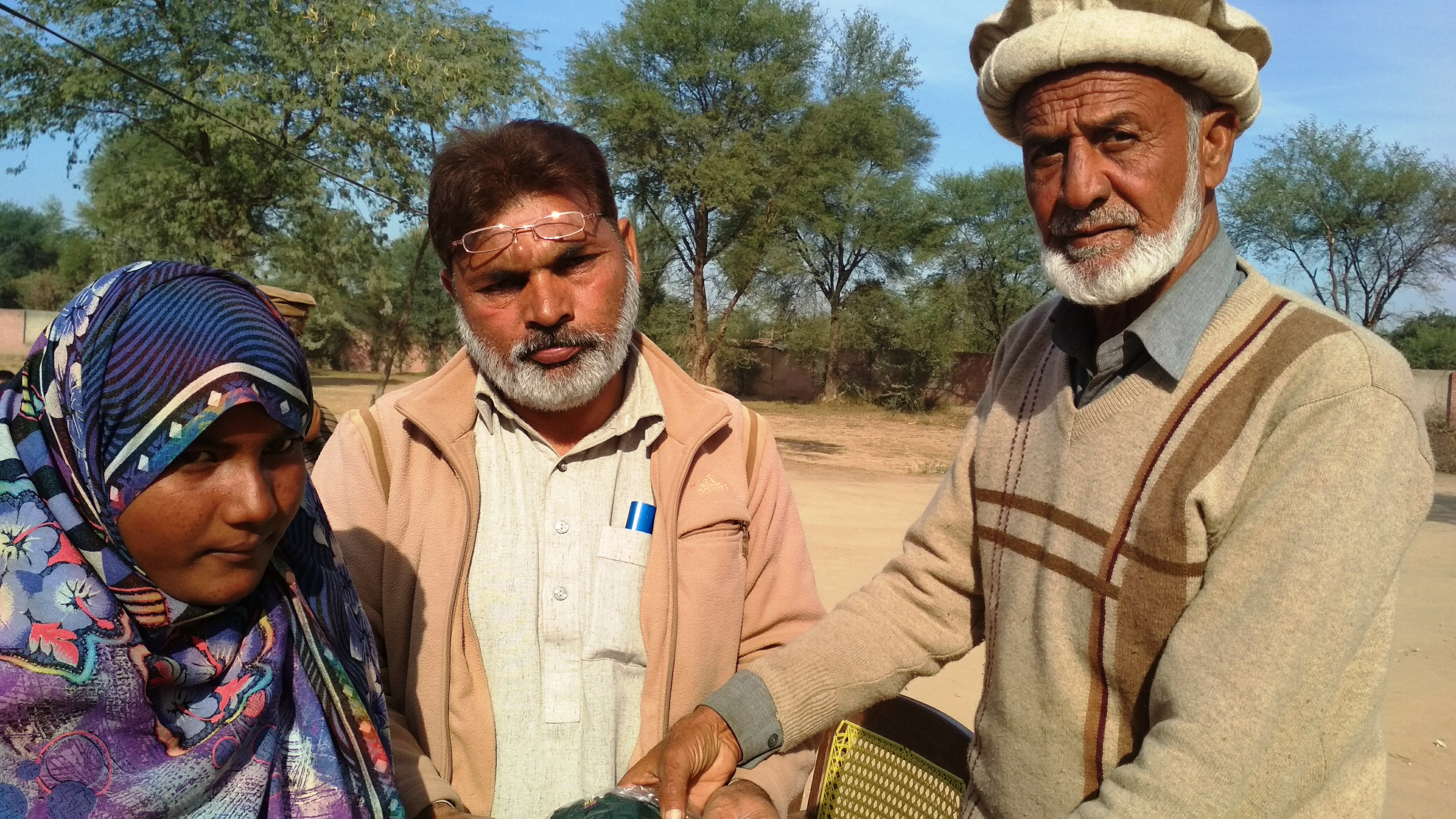
Former Headmaster Syed Asghar Husain Shah delivers winter clothes among students at Govt. Primary School Chak 129 NB. Head Master Ameer Abdullah is also present.

According to elders, before colonial settlement, there was a pond in its western side where a Hindu Yogi (Saadhu) lived due to which the village was also called Saadh wala (سادھ والا). The people from far flung area came with their cattle to the pond for drinking water. The Chak was established by the British Government of India after completion of northern branch of Lower Jehlum Canal in 1901 under 1st Colonization Officer of Sargodha Mr. Malcolm Hailey. So it was one of many villages settled in British Colony of Lower Jehlum Canal Sargodha. Initially it was part of Tehsil and District Shahpur. Major population consists of the settlers from Rawalpindi, Jehlum, and Chakwal who were rewarded agriculture land in turn of their services rendered for the British Army. As they got monthly pension for their service so were also called "Pensioners" (پنسلی) in local language. The second major portion came from Indian Punjab after partition in 1947 therefore called Muhajirs. Most of them were Raajput (راجپوت) by caste and were allotted houses of the Hindus who resided here before partition, The last settlement was made for affected families of Mangla Dam (AJK) around 1970 and therefore called Mangla Demis. Most of Baloch families migrated from the inundated area of River Jehlum who timely were displaced due to flood but afterwards became permanent residents. Remaining population is mix up of different castes. Comparatively a well developed village, it has its own Govt. Girls High School, Union Council office and a Livestock dispensary, five mosques, one private hospital and two private schools.

== Demography ==
About 35 km away from Sargodha city southward and 3 km from its Tehsil headquarters Sillanwali, the village occupies a central place by joining Faruka Road, Lalian Road, Sillanwali Road, Jhang Road and Sargodha Road. It is surrounded by Chak 125 NB in north west and Chak 127 NB in north, Sillanwali city in north east, Chak 130 NB in east, Chak 144/145 NB in south west and Chak 128 NB in west. According to Census 2017, its population is 3612. Major clans are Rajput, Syed, Mirza, Mangla Daimi, Awan, Khokhar, Arain, Janjua, Pathan Kaka Zai.

== Agriculture ==
Majority of people living in this village are farmers who own their land, but as times change, these people have been progressively going into business. The village is still entirely agricultural. Its major crops are wheat, sugar cane, cotton, barley, oats, pulses and citrus etc. The northern branch of Lower Jhelum Canal (constructed in 1900), provides better irrigation to the village. The village contains fertile land and is surrounded by lush green beautiful citrus orchards and agricultural farms.

== Fauna and flora ==
The area consists of all major wildlife such as Jackal, Fox, Porcupine, wolf, wild boar, wild hare, wild cats, doves, crows, multiple sparrows, pigeons, wood woody pecker, kites, Teetri, ducks, lizards, snakes, tortoise, frogs, toad etc. The green parrots, white necked vultures and Neel Kanth (نیل چاہ) are getting extinct day by day. The people also breed cows, buffaloes, horses, sheep, goats, peacocks, ducks, hens, rabbits and dogs as pets. There are Multiple species of shrubs and weeds such as Kashmiri Keekar, Sars, Kari, Harmal, Aak, Sheesham, Berry, Simbloo, popler, wild dates and sufaida trees around the village either self-grown or planted by Forest Department along Lower Jehlum Canal and Railway Track. Local farmers also grow a large number of ornamental and fruit trees and vegetables i.e. Kinno, Jaman, Mangoes, Lemon, apricot and pomegranate etc.

== Eminent Personalities ==
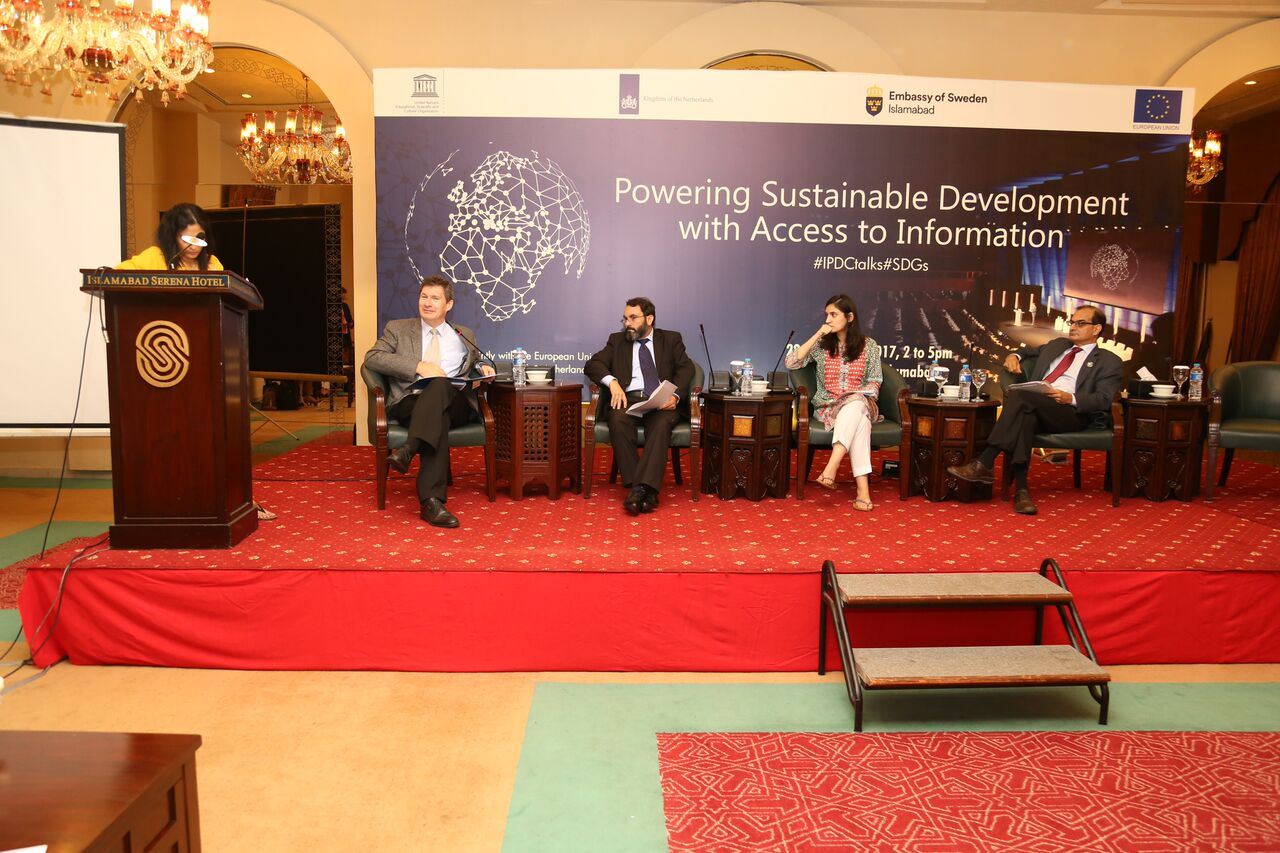
Haji Ahmad Naeem representing Punjab in a global event organized by UNESCO, EU, Sweden & Netherlands Embassy (28-09-2017)

The local persons have contributed well in the military, civil and social service sector. Major personalities consist of Syed Asghar Hussain Shah, former Headmaster of local Govt. Primary School who improved the structure of the school in 70's and turned it into a source of quality education. His students are serving the Military and Civil Services of Pakistan. One of his students Mr. Haji Ahmad Naeem served as Executive Director in Punjab Information Commission Lahore. He got Silver Medal in Matric exams from Sargodha Board and Gold Medal from Punjab University Lahore in MA. Mr. Naeem has got opportunity to represent Punjab at global IPDC Talks held on the International Day of Universal access to Information on 28 September 2017 and organized by the UNESCO with its partners i.e. UNO, EU and Islamabad Embassies of Sweden and Netherlands. Former Headmaster Mriza Muhammad Ashraf's son M. Hafeez Anjum was the first who got degree of Civil Engineering, now serving in the USA. Malik Muhammad Afzal Awan, former Chairman & Nazim of the local Union Council has also played a remarkable role in development of the village. He also has honor to establish and run Madrasah and mosques for Quran education. Shaheed Khizar Hayat Khan lit the name of his village by embracing martyrdom while serving the Pak Army. Currently Major Muhammad Kashif Raza Malik is serving the Pak Army. He is son of JCO (Retired from Pak Air Force) Malik Amanullah and nephew of Haji Ahmad Naeem. Mr. Malik Atif Naeem Son of Retired Headmaster (Chak 144/145) Malik Ghulam Yasin and nephew of Ahmad Naeem Malik is related with Business Community and doing business of Anti Cancer Medicines nationally. Mr. Syed Naseem Abbas Kazmi is seving as Incharg Land Record. Sardar Farukh Khan Pathan is performing his duty in Elete Force.
