= Chak No. 38 =

Village in Mandi Bahauddin, Punjab, Pakistan

Chak No. 38 چک نمبر 38 Dinga Chak
- Village
- ڈنگہ چک
- Interactive map of Chak No. 38
- Coordinates: 32.4949°N 73.4685°E
- Country: Pakistan
- Province: Punjab
- District: Mandi Bahauddin
- Tehsil: Mandi Bahauddin

Area
  - Total: 240 ha (600 acres)

Population (2017/18)
  - Total: 6,170
- Time zone: +5:00 Standard Timezone of Pakistan
- Post Office: 50471 Chak no 38

Chak No. 38 (Urdu: چک نمبر 38) is a village in Mandi Bahauddin District, in the Punjab province of Pakistan. The village is located eight kilometres (5.0 mi) south of the city of Mandi Bahauddin.

Its zip code is 50471. It was well known during British rule due to its organized bazaars and local markets which were under the control of the Chowdhury community. The village is named after the Choudhury tribes who traditionally came here with their families according to the normal practice for a Chak (village) of Pakistani Punjab. They lived beside a bend in the canal which flows through an Upper Jhelum Canal, which was a suitable, sheltered location. This is the reason why it is called Dinga Chak.

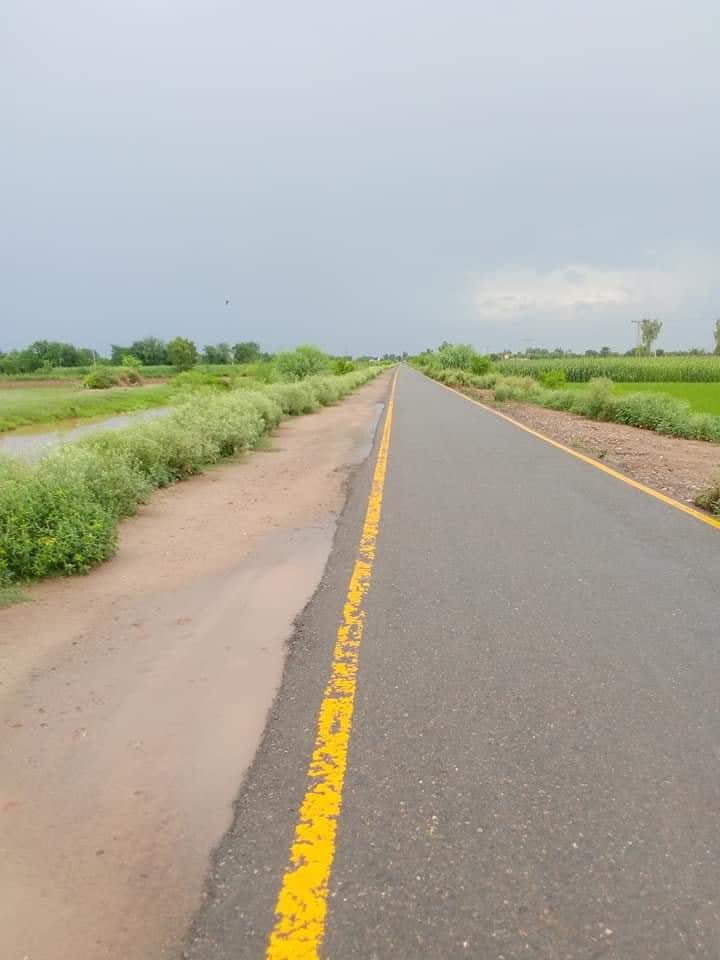
Road to Chak no 38

== Demographics ==
The population of Chak No 38 is over 6170 people including Daira's. The literacy rate is over 50%. There is the Government Primary School for Boys which is one of the oldest in the area and was established in 1992 and Elementary School for Girls which was established in 1993. There is also a Basic Health Unit in the village. Culturally, Dinga Chak is a very diverse village, with people from different clans residing.

== Economy ==
Before 1993, agriculture was the only source of income for the people of the village but now many young men are working in Europe and the Middle East and send remittances home to their families. Many educated people are serving the nation and the area by working in government and private jobs after completing their higher education.
