= Jahanawala =

- Village
- Location in Pakistan
- Coordinates: 31°50′32″N 72°28′41″E
- Country: Pakistan
- Province: Punjab
- District: Sargodha

Jahanawala or Jahanewala (Urdu; جہانیوالا) is a village in Sargodha District of Punjab, Pakistan. It comes under the administration of Sahiwal Tehsil under the Sajooka union council. It is considered as an ancient village. However, the modern settlements trace back to 1800s. Though the traces of old town can still be found on the orchards of the outskirts. Historically, it is part of the Arar "Arar, Tehsil Sahiwal, District Sargodha." estate, currently headed by Rai Haq Nawaz Dhudy.

Jahanewala lies in between Sillanwali Tehsil and the city of Farooqa. The village consists of two midtown areas i.e. Kot Amanullah and Kot Allahdad. Dhudy and Joyia clans are in the majority here.

Kinnow, Wheat, and Mango are cultivated excessively among other crops. Though livestock farming is also a major part of the community.

"Nava Lahore", is its colony located about a kilometer from main village. Though it was settled a few years back but has emerged as a fast-growing populous town in this area. Some of Jahanewala's suburbs and outskirts settlements include 'Oad Colony' and 'Bhin'.
