= Deendar =

Deendar (Urdu: دين دار, romanized: dīn dar, lit. 'follower of religion') is a Muslim community in Pakistan.

A changar is a lower-caste person; a changar who practises Islam is referred to as a deendar changar, comparable to India's untouchables.

During the British Raj, some members of the Panwar Rajputs community converted to Islam. After the independence of Pakistan in 1947 they and their descendants became known as Deendar in Pakistan.

Some Panwar Rajputs are called Deendar because their ancestors were among the last to accept Islam. Most of them are located in Sialkot, Lahore, Gujranwala, Vehari and Khanewal.

== See also ==
- Muslim Shaikh
