= Lakhiwal Sharif =

- Village and union council
- Interactive map of Lakhiwal Sharif
- Coordinates: 31°59′8″N 72°18′30″E
- Country: Pakistan
- Province: Punjab
- District: Sargodha
- Time zone: UTC+5 (PST)

Lakhiwal or Lakhiwal Sharif is a village and union council 139 of Sahiwal Tehsil, Sargodha District, in Punjab, Pakistan. It lies on the Jhelum River.

It is known for its greenery and its date palm fruit, common in this area.

== Demographics ==
Its population amounts to about 3800 (2017).

== Sufism ==
Lakhiwal Sharif is a Sufi spiritual centre. It contains the shrine of the Sufi saint Syed Muhammad Afzal Shah and Syed Ahmad Anwar Shah Hamdani and of their descendants.

Former saints are ancestors of Saadat-E-Hamdania living in Lakhiwal sharif. Sajada Nasheen Darbar Lakhiwal Sharif is Syed Ali Shah Sultan Bilawal Hamdani (Syed Muhammad Afzal Shah Hamdani).

The Sajjada Nasheen of Sakhi Shah Chuttan Imam Hamdani, Syed Mehdi Shah Hamdani and great Sufi saint Alhaj Syed Ahmed Anwer Shah Hamdani's holy shrines is Syed Muhammad Siraj Ul Haq Hamdani Qadri.

== History ==
Lakhiwal Sharif's history can be traced to the 18th century when Syeds migrated from Danda Shah Bilawal district Chakwal and settled here.

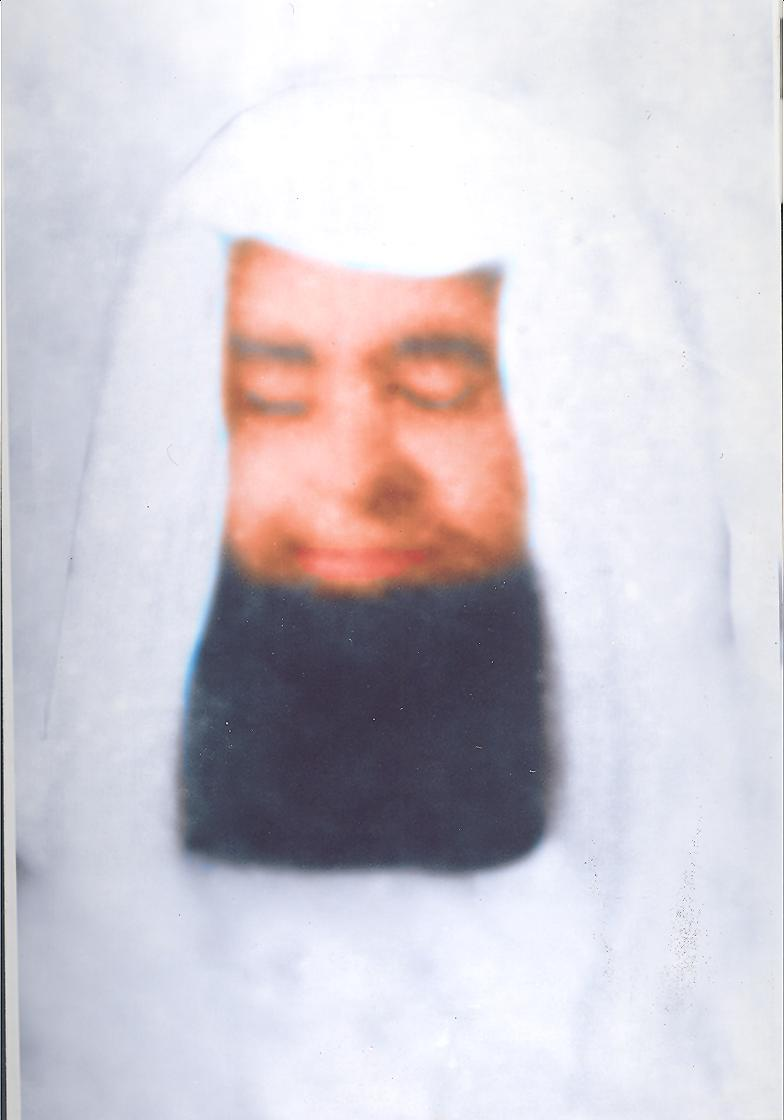
Syed Ahmad Anwar Shah Hamdani

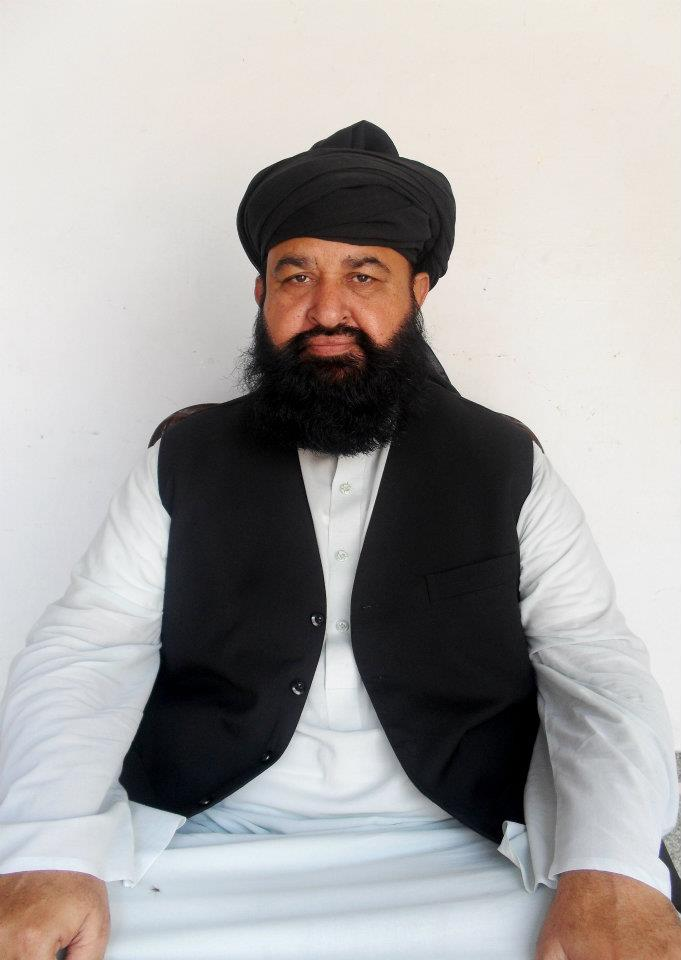
Syed Siraj-ul-Haq Hamadani Qadri (custodian of the Lakhiwal shrine)

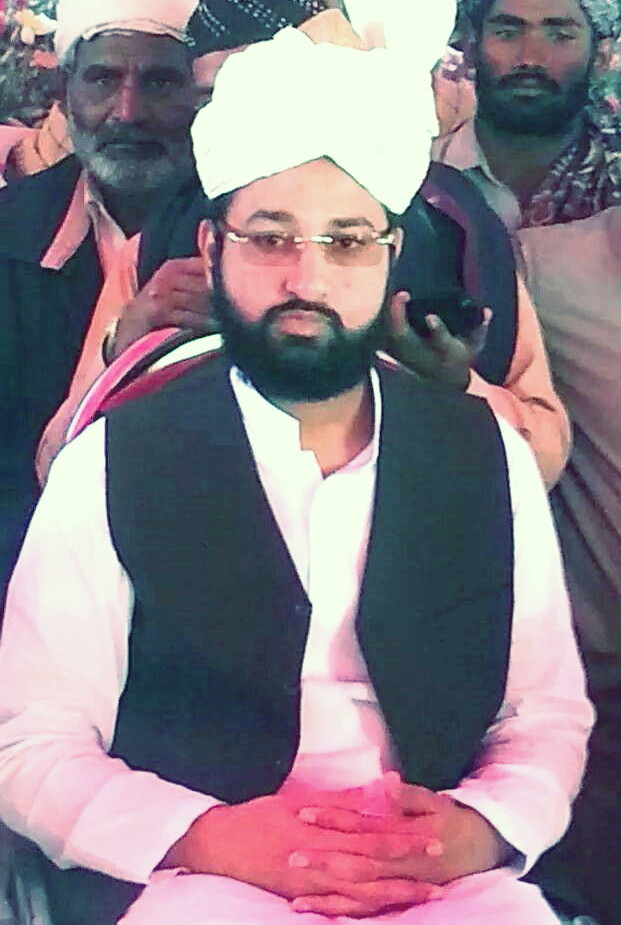
Syed Ali Shah Bilawal, custodian of the Lakhiwal shrine

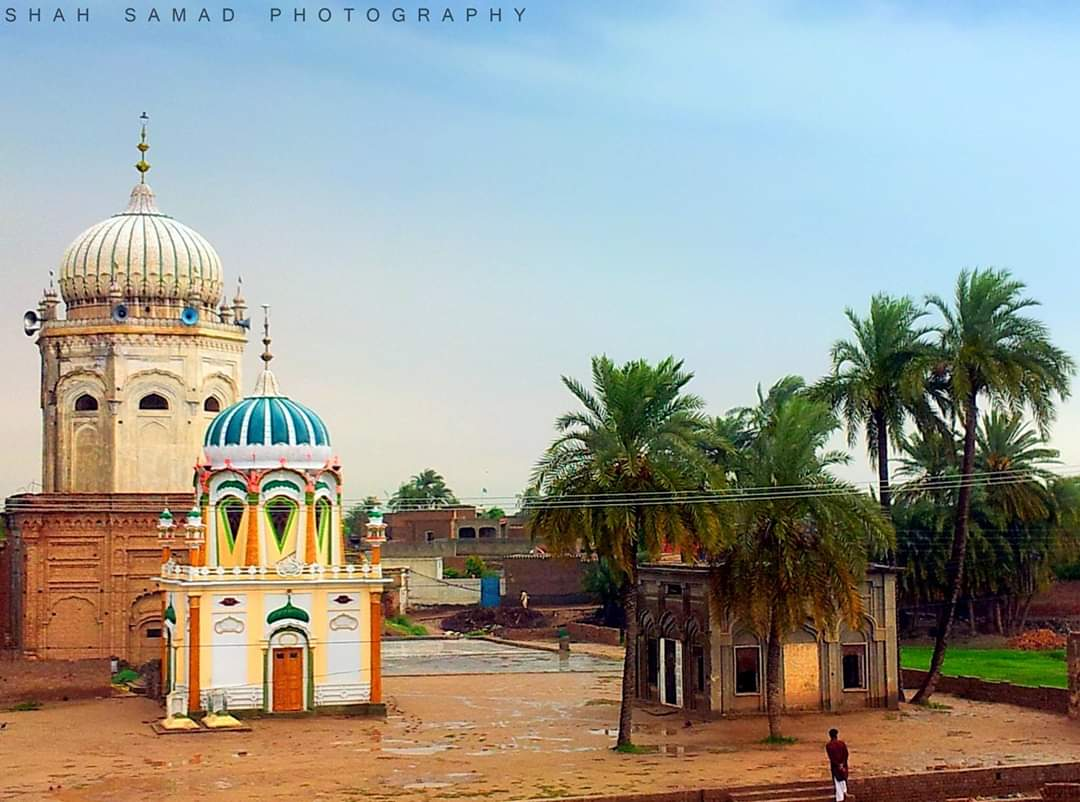
Lakhiwal Sharif shrine.
