= Chak, Punjab =

Village in Sahiwal District, Punjab, Pakistan

Chak sikandar is a village near the city of Chichawatni in the Sahiwal District of Punjab, Pakistan. Chak sikandar is located 35 km away from the historical city of Gujrat . It is known for its proximity to a forest. It is 30 kilometer from the national highway of Pakistan, and only 40 kilometers from the Ravi River, one of the largest rivers in Pakistan.

The vast majority of people living in Chak Sikandar are farmers, with very little education.
