= Muslim Shaikh =

The Muslim Shaikh (Punjabi: مسلم شیخ; Urdu: مسلم شیخ) are a community found in the Punjab province of Pakistan. The Shah Khel community of the Hazara, has similar roots.

There are a number of traditions as to the origin of the Muslim Shaikhs. Most of these carry its history back to Balmik, as the ancestor of the tribe. Many members of the Hindu Dalit community converted to Christianity during the British Raj.

During the 19th century, many Hindus converted to Islam, especially in the western parts of Punjab, and the Khyber Pakhtunkhwa.

They were merchants of the village communities, and used to live in huts at a distance from the village. Their job included collecting taxes from houses. But by the 19th century, most of them had taken to agricultural work.

== Language ==
They speak various dialects of Punjabi Urdu and/or Sindhi, depending where they reside.

== Present circumstances ==
A recent report on the conditions of the Shah Khel community came to this conclusion:

"The respondents in this village claim to have settled in this village over 200 years ago. They live in a cluster of 30 houses 300 yards from the main houses of the village. The houses used to number 200 at first. Their people used to earn from agricultural and livestock work. Some went to the city and made some savings. Now the community is divided between the richer ones who do the livestock business and live outside the village in nearby cities, and the others who are permanent residents and do agricultural and domestic work. The wealthier community members who left the village still come back to marry their children within the clan. They get free wood and milk from the landlord on weddings and deaths." It is further found that many Shah Khel were still involved in their traditional occupation of begging.

Shah Khel also suffer from being bonded labourers, as a number of recent studies have shown.

== See also ==
- Deendar
- Halalkhor
- Haral Chuhra
