= Sahiwal, Sargodha =

City in Punjab, Pakistan

Sahiwal ساہیوال چھوٹا ساہیوال Small Sahiwal
- City
- Sahiwal
- Location within Punjab, Pakistan Location within Pakistan
- Country: Pakistan
- Province: Punjab
- District: Sargodha
- Tehsil: Sahiwal (Sargodha)

Government
  - Type: Municipal Committee
  - Chairman: Vacant
  - Vice-Chairman: Vacant

Population (2023 census)
  - City: 57,374
  - Rank: 212th in Pakistan (2023)

Sahiwal (Punjabi: ساہِيوال, Urdu: ساہِيوال) is the main city in Sahiwal Tehsil of Sargodha District, Punjab, Pakistan.

Sahiwal city has 8,269 households and population of 57,374 per 2023 Pakistani census.

== Demographics ==
Historical population
Year	Pop.	±% p.a.
1972	19,988	—
1981	21,231	+0.67%
1998	32,019	+2.45%
2017	48,286	+2.19%
2023	57,374	+2.92%
