= Chak village =

Chak
- Village
- Chak
- Nickname: Chak Changiya
- Chak in the map Chak (India)
- Coordinates (Chak): 27°28′45.4908″N 81°28′37.4376″E
- Country: India
- State: Uttar Pradesh
- District: Bahraich
- tahsil: Mahsi
- Block: Tajwapur
- Post office: Maila saraiya
- Gram Panchayat: Ramgadi
- Founder: Chanda Ansari
- Named for: chanda ansari

Government
  - Type: Democracy
  - Body: Gram panchayat
  - Head of village: Mrs. Bano Ansari (Independents)
  - MLA: Mr. Sureshwar Singh

Area
  - Total: 0.1796938067936 km^{2} (0.0693801666797 sq mi)

Dimensions
  - Length: 0.50474885852 km (0.31363640000 mi)
  - Width: 0.35600636586 km (0.22121210000 mi)
- Elevation: 126 m (413 ft)

Population (2011)
  - Total: 832
  - Density: 4,630.0983592364/km^{2} (11,991.899700108/sq mi)

Language
  - Official language: Hindi

Spoken languages
  - Languages: Hindi urdu awadhi English
- Time zone: UTC+5:30 (IST)
- PIN code: 271902
- STD Code: 05255
- Vehicle registration plate: UP-40

Chak is a village in Bahraich district of the Indian state of Uttar Pradesh. It is 6 km west of Fakharpur and 21 km south of district headquarters Bahraich. This village is under Ramgadhi Panchayat Police Station Baundi Development Block Tajwapur Tehsil Mahsi. and Chak village is 114 km from Lucknow, the capital of Uttar Pradesh. The village is administered by the village headman, who is an elected representative.

Chak village is a rural area. The people here are farmers who mainly do agricultural work. Paddy, wheat, sugarcane and mustard are Yield is high in this area.

== Geography ==
It has an average elevation of 126 meters (413 ft) above sea level. The coordinates are 27°28′45.4908″N 81°28′37.4376″E. Chak village has hot humid subtropical climate with warm summers from April to July. The rainy season is from July to mid-September. Chak Village receives average rainfall from south-west monsoon winds, and sometimes frontal rainfall in January. The maximum temperature in winter is around 25 °C (77 °F) and the minimum is −1 to 7 °C (30 to 45 °F). From the end of November to the middle of February, the fog is quite heavy. From mid-December to mid-January, there is a lot of frost, due to which the cold is more. Summers are extremely hot, with temperatures rising to 40 to 47 °C (104 to 117 °F), the month of May–June with hot winds and strong winds, sometimes accompanied by thunderstorms. Rainfall occurs at an average elevation of 30 °C. The average annual rainfall is 1,900 centimeters (750 in) (approximately).

== neighborhood ==
Nearby villages Molhe purwa (0.5 km), Badhin purwa (0.7 km), Tarapur (0.6 km), Kurmin purwa (1 km), Thakuran Tarapur (1.1 km), Chamaran purwa (0.9 km), Nakdilpur (1.2 km), tiwaripurwa (1 km), Maila saraiya (1.5 km) Telin purwa (2 km) Navvan Purwa (2.3 km), Behad (2 km), Behad Chauraha (1.2 km),

nearby towns Khaira Bazar, Baundi, Jaitapur Bazar, Bednapur, Fakharpur, Waziganj Saraiya, gajodharpur, Kaisarganj, Mahrajganj bazar, Reusa, Tambaur, Rampur Mathura, jarwal qashba, huzurpur,

== History ==
Chak village history is very old, the history of this village starts from the time the village was formed, the old people of the village have been getting information about the history of the village, as the old people of the village say that the village is here. Before its formation there used to be a dense forest here, it is about 200 years old when this village emerged, the first of this village had two or more houses in which one house belonged to Thakur Saheb and the other house belonged to Salabat Ansari Which was situated on the edge of the forest, the village had no official name at that time, when Chanda Ansari and his brother Kariya Ansari who had come from Kakori village near Lucknow arrived in this village, he became Thakur. Saheb said to Chanda Ansari that Chanda brother, you should build your house in this chak of ours, chak means my field, so Chanda Ansari made his house in the chak of Thakur Saheb, since then the official name of this village has become Chak. Later people came from different places and today it has become a big village, before the independence of India this village was part of Rehuva State, which was a small independent princely state during British rule. The fort of Rehuva princely state, whose headquarters was situated on the banks of the river Saryu in Bednapur, still exists today. Chanda Ansari's grandson Hafizur Rahman Ansari tells that when Gandhi ji started the Quit India Movement, many youths of Chak village actively participated in the movement, Hafizur Rahman Ansari and Ravnak Salmani were the main ones, besides Jamilur Rahman Ansari and Habibur Rahman Ansari had also played the main role, at the time when India got independence, the people of the village were very happy, when the country became independent, all the princely states of India came to an end and democracy came to the country, some people of the village started their business. Some people left the village and went to the city to earn money and some started doing farming at home, Habibur Rahman Ansari started the work of wood contracting, at that time he earned a lot of money in Chak village in the decade of 1980 to 90 Habibur Rahman Ansari was called as Mahajan due to high money, Mahajan means the one who has more money, then gradually some people went towards Lucknow, Kanpur Delhi, Mumbai, Kolkata and Hyderabad, there they earned very good. And some people have built their own house and lived there.

== Festival ==
Eid and Bakra Eid is the main festival here as the village has a majority population of the Muslim community. And Holi and Diwali are also celebrated with great enthusiasm.

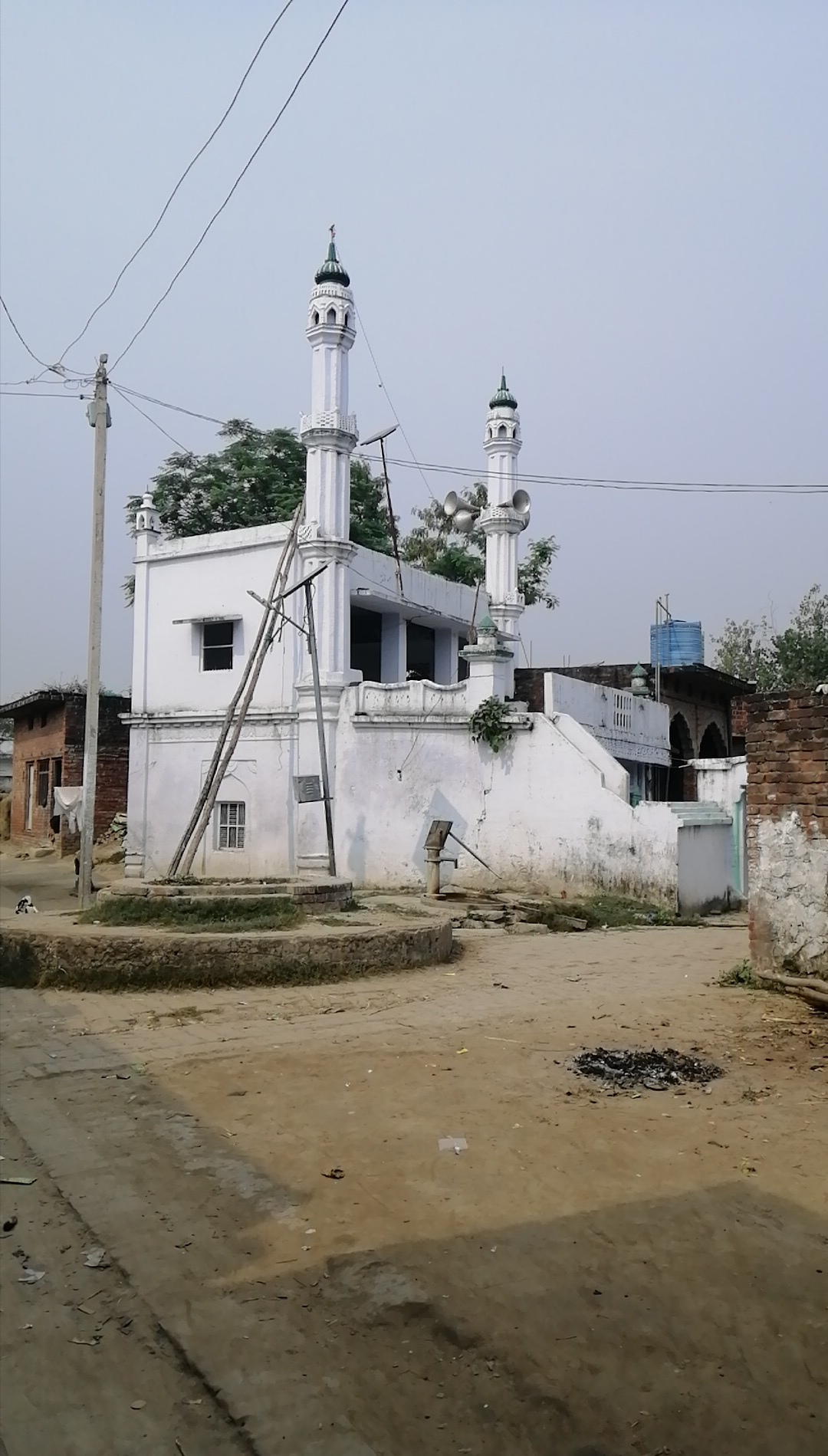
A view of the Jama Masjid Chak located near the well in the northwest of the village

== The origin of the name ==
The name Chak is derived from Awadhi language. The fields in Uttar Pradesh are also called Chak. It has been heard from some older people. That there was formerly dense forest in place of Chak village. Some Muslims lived near the same forest like Bhagu Ansari and his son Salabat Ansari and a Thakur Sahab. But that village had no name. When Chanda Ansari and his brother Karia Ansari came to that village, they came from Kakori village in Lucknow district. So that Thakur Saheb said that Chanda Bhai,(brother) build your house in this chak(field) Chanda Ansari made her home in that chak. Since then the name of that village was to Chak.

== education ==
There is a Hindi medium government school in this village. Whose name is (primary school chak). He is located near the house of Wajid Ali Ansari in the northeast of the village. And the other one is a private madrasa (madrasa islamia Arabia anwarul uloom chak). Which is located near the mosque in the middle of the village.

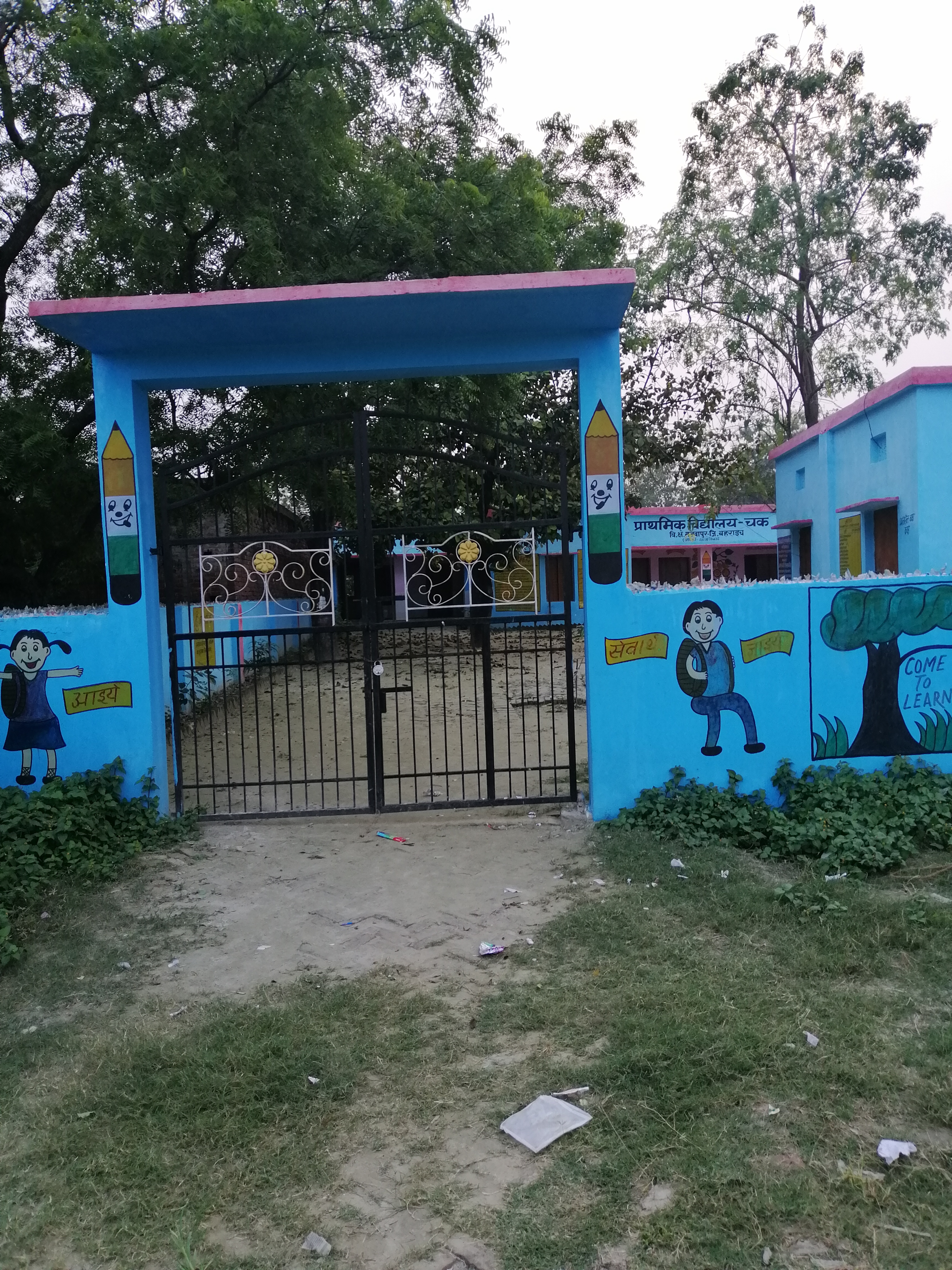
Primary school located in the northeast of Chak village

== health ==
There is no hospital in this village. At a distance of 2 km from here, a Government Hospital Primary Health Care Center is located in Khaira Bazar. And another primary health center is located in Pathak Patti village, which is 2.5 kilometers away. And there is a block level government hospital in Rampurwa chowki village, 12 km away, where women delivery facilities are available. Apart from this, 21 km from here the district hospital is in Bahraich city. There are many more private hospitals in Bahraich. Such as Interior India Mission Hospital, Sitapur Eye Hospital, Kedia Hospital, Saira Hospital, CMSD STORE BAHRAICH, Noor Hospital, Mahesh poly clinic, Khalsa nursing home, Sanjivani hospital, Neeraj hospital, Buddha hospital, Chhaya maternity home & heart clinic, Awadh nursing home, Sakuntla poly clinic, Raj hospital, Bhartia seva hospital, Nova hospital, Malian hospital & research center pvt Ltd, Siddharth hospital, Sangam hospital, Dr.M.M.Arshi,
