= Chak 152 P, Sadiqabad =

Chak 152/P
- Village
- Location within Pakistan
- Coordinates: 28°10′N 70°42′E
- Country: Pakistan
- Province: Punjab
- District: Rahim Yar Khan
- Tehsil: Sadiqabad
- Time zone: UTC+5 (PST)

Chak 152P is a village in Sadiqabad, Rahim Yar Khan District, Punjab, Pakistan. In 2004, a military farm was located at Chak 152P. In 2003, a camel-fighting mela was held in the village. The village has 1515 registered voters.
