= Chak No.21/MB =

Chak No. 21/MB
- Village
- Location within Pakistan
- Coordinates: 32°11′59″N 71°59′53″E
- Country: Pakistan
- Region: Punjab Province
- District: Khushab District

Population
  - Total: 1,000
- Time zone: UTC+5 (PST)

Chak No. 21 MB is a village of Khushab District in the Punjab Province of Pakistan. It is situated on Mitha Tiwana, Adhi Kot road. It is 37 km (23 miles) from District Headquarters Jauharabad and 91 km (57 miles) from Divisional Headquarters Sargodha. The 2001 population was 1,000.

The Union Council is Chak. No:14/MB. The major tribes include: Khokhar, Rajpoot, Kohlar, Kalera, Balouch, Warraich, and Arain.

== Geography ==
The land is in a desert climate, with irrigated areas.

== Economy ==
The major crops include: gram, wheat, sugar cane.
