= Khichian =

Khichian کھچیاں Chak Number 106 J.B Khichian
- Village
- 106 J.B Khichian
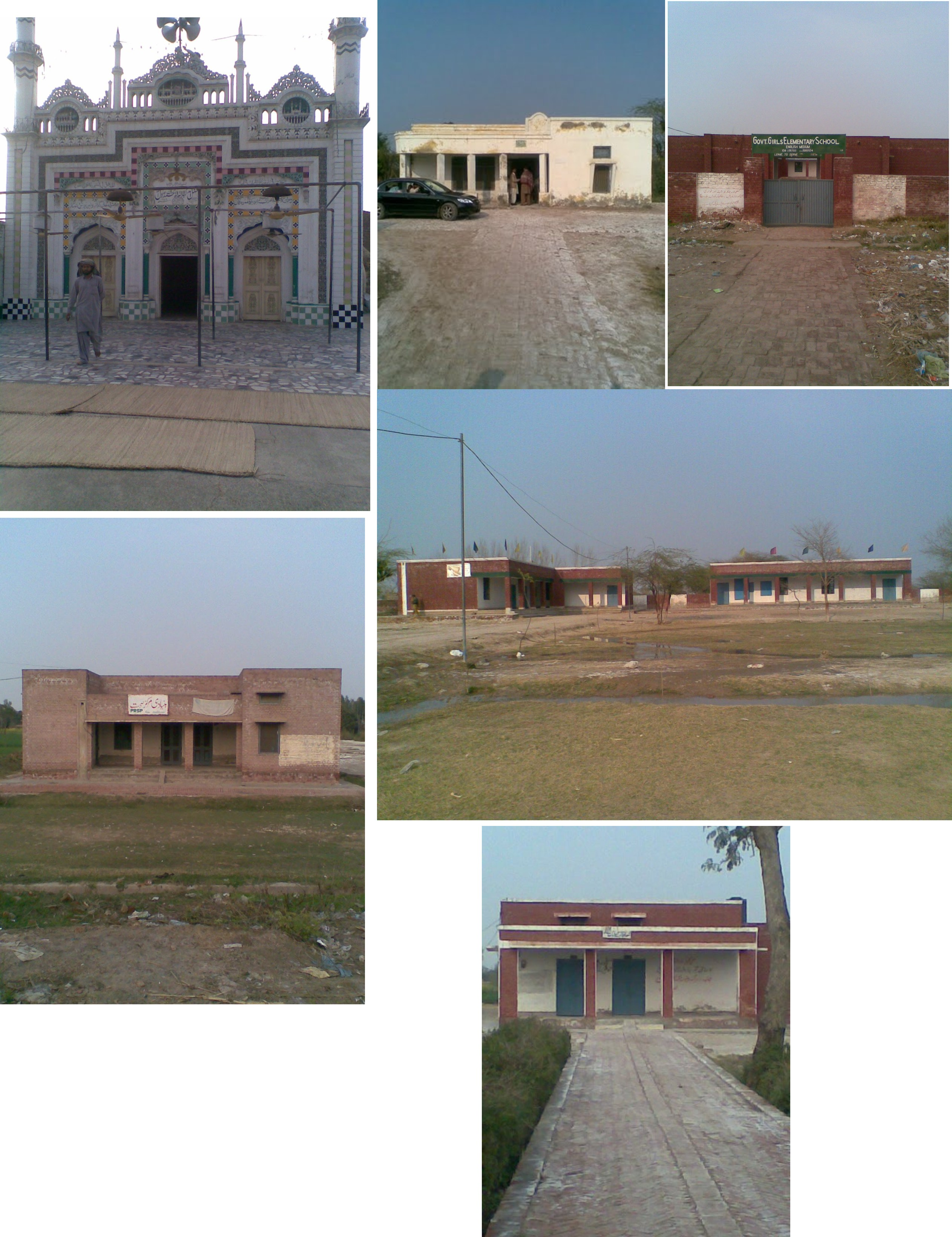
- Jamia Masjid, Union Council 4, Govt. Girls Elementary School. Basic Health Center, Govt. Boys Elementary School, Civil Veterinary Hospital

- Location in Pakistan
- Coordinates: 31°36′27.83″N 73°07′31.35″E
- Country: Pakistan
- Region: Punjab
- District: Faisalabad District
- Time zone: UTC+5 (PST)
  - Summer (DST): UTC+6 (PDT)

Khichian (Urdu: کھچیاں ) is a village in the Faisalabad District, on Chiniot-Chak Jhumra Road, Punjab, Pakistan. It is in Tehsil Chak Jhumra's Union Council # 04 and is 4 km away from the (Faisalabad to Pindi Bhattian) M-4 motorway's Deputy Wala Interchange. Its latitude is 31° 36' 27.83"N, and longitude is 73° 07' 31.35"E. The people of Khichian use the M3 to commute, as it is 140 kilometers away from Lahore and 24 kilometers away from Faisalabad. Nearby towns are Faisalabad, Chak Jhumra, Chiniot, Pindi Bhattian. By road, Khichian is connected to Faisalabad, Barnala, Chak Jhumra, and Chiniot.

== Climate ==
Due to its high evapotranspiration, Khichian has an arid climate. The climate of the Village can be extreme, with a summer maximum temperature 50 °C (122 °F) and a winter temperature of −1 °C (30 °F). The mean maximum and minimum temperatures in summer are 39 °C (102 °F) and 27 °C (81 °F) respectively. In winter it peaks at around 21 °C (70 °F) and 6 °C (43 °F) respectively. The summer season starts from April and continues until October. May, June and July are the hottest months. The winter season starts from November and continues until March. December, January and February are the coldest months. The average yearly rainfall lies only at about 200mm (7.9 in) and is highly seasonal with approximately half of the yearly rainfall in the two months July and August.

== Economy ==
The economy is small and mainly agricultural. A canal from Jhang Branch passes through the village. Irrigation water for land comes from this canal, also the land is very fertile. Some people go to Faisalabad, Lahore and Karachi for employment.
