= Chak, Sindh =

Chak چَڪ
- Chak Town
- Country: Pakistan
- Province: Sindh

Population
  - Total: >40,000
- Demonym: Chakiite
- Time zone: UTC+05:00 (PST)
- Dialling code: 0726
- Website: Chak

Chak (Sindhi: چڪ) is a town situated on the west bank of the Indus River in Shikarpur District, Sindh, Pakistan. It is an economic, educational, social and transport hub of the adjoining towns and villages of the region. It is home to a population of more than 40,000 people and is a fast-growing town with good literacy rate and improving infrastructure. It is home to Mahar, Soomra, Channa, Mangi's and many other tribes. Chak also has an important place in Shikarpur District politically, socially and economically. Historically, Chak had been part of Sukkur District, but in the late 1970s it was made part of Shikarpur District. Chak shares strong economic and social ties with Sukkur because of the natural geographic and trade route proximity.

== Etymology ==
Chak is said to be derived from a Sindhi language word chakki, meaning 'pot wheel', which is used to make pottery from clay. The clay used to be obtained from the cheeki matti, the mud from inside the nearby 'Kacha' area, which is the area between two levees of the Indus River bordering the town. It is said that there used to live many potters in the area and the town got its name from the chakki (pot wheel) used by these people.

== Climate ==
The climate of Chak is hot and misty during summer days while cold and dry in winter. Generally the summer season commences in March–April and ends before October. January in winter chills from 2 to 27 °C. The summer temperature averages 38 °C though it often shoots up to 47 °C.

== Economy ==
Agriculture, retailer shops, jobs in government and private organisations are the main way of living. Wholesale market is also growing up. The Bhitai Bazar & Bazar-e-Raza running through the heart of the town are the main artery of business of this small but bustling town of the locality, attracting many visitors and customers from nearby towns and villages as well. Many short bazars have also sprung up in the outskirts of the town.

== Food ==
Chak has many food stalls, with some stalls having traditional food, and in some areas, fast food. Due to agriculture being the main work of people, roti and okra are eaten in practically every household.

Examples of popular food are:

- Pakora: A fritter originating from the Indian subcontinent made of potatoes and onions, and are deep fried.
- Samosa: A samosa is a popular fried South Asian and West Asian snack, typically a triangular pastry with a savory filling. The filling commonly consists of spiced potatoes, onions, and peas, but can also include meat, fish, or cheese.
- Burger: Although they have the exact same name as a regular burger, the locals do have a tendency make a special version of a burger that resembles a sandwich it is made with aloo tikki, onions and sometimes cheese.

Chak also has many areas with different interests so some areas have different stalls.

== Transport ==
Chak serves as a transport hub for the other towns of the locality. It is connected to Sukkur, Shikarpur and other towns via link roads leading to the National Highway (known as N-65). It is also connected to the Indus Highway (known as N-55) via Rustam town. A large number of businessmen, workers, employees, students and other people commute to Sukkur daily through designated travel services of dozens of buses and more than 60 vans to Sukkur and adjoining areas. Sukkur Airport is at a distance of around 20 kilometres south-east. Most People use Motorbikes to Commute to Work or School, buses or other means of public transport to get around.

== Education ==
Despite meager resources and poor infrastructure, many students from this small town have made it to the top colleges and universities in the country. Also many people are working in good positions in government and private organisations. There are primary and high schools for girls and boys separately. Few years back the high school for boys was upgraded to higher-secondary school. However, the quality of teaching and infrastructure to cater to the higher-secondary level have yet to be improved. Therefore, a sizeable proportion of students still commutes to Sukkur for higher-secondary education.

Following are the main educational schools and centres in Chak:

- Government Higher Secondary School
- Government Girls High School
- Government Primary School for Boys
- Government Primary School for Girls
- Ideal Public School
- Shah Latif Public School
- Al-Mustafa Public School

== Libraries ==
- The Shah Latif Library, established in 1979 by local people on self-help basis, was the town's only library until recently. The library is named after the great Sufi scholar and saint Shah Abdul Latif Bhittai (1689–1752), who is considered as the greatest poet of the Sindhi language. The library has a repository of thousands of books mainly donated by local people. Unfortunately, now it is in a deplorable condition as it is housed in a rented old tattered building. The town very badly needs a new library with state-of-the-art facilities.
- Shaheed Benazir Bhutto Library, established in 2004, is a welcome addition as it was the long-standing demand of the town. The library still does not have the basic information technology and e-learning infrastructure and needs to be upgraded so that the growing student population of the town can be connected to other national and international libraries electronically and be part of the increasingly knowledge-based and connected society.
- Sathi library, also established on self-help basis in 2004, is based at the Humbah locality of the town. Despite its limited capacity, it is providing much needed services to a large number of students.

== Places of interest ==
Shrines of Sufi saints in Hazrat Humbah – especially during the annual Urs, the death anniversary of a Sufi saint held at the saint's shrine. The Urs is a grand affair in town, where people from all walks of life from Chak and surrounding villages make a determined effort to attend. The Urs lasts for three days. The musical gatherings are the central event of the Urs, where disciples and singers gather around and sing passages from verses of the saints. The anniversary is also marked by food fairs, open-air markets selling traditional Sindhi ware, and entertaining and competitive sports. (such as, volleyball, hockey, and Cricket)

== See also ==
- Sukkur
- Sindhi
- Shah Abdul Latif Bhittai
- The Shah Latif Library
