= Chak Mai Dass =

- Village
- Location in Punjab, India Chak Mai Dass (India)
- Coordinates: 31.1935536°N 75.8984655°E
- Country: India
- State: Punjab
- District: Shaheed Bhagat Singh Nagar

Government
  - Type: Panchayat raj
  - Body: Gram panchayat
- Elevation: 251 m (823 ft)

Population (2011)
  - Total: 811
- Sex ratio 417/394 ♂/♀

Languages
  - Official: Punjabi
- Time zone: UTC+5:30 (IST)
- PIN: 144501
- Telephone code: 01884
- ISO 3166 code: IN-PB
- Post office: Kultham
- Website: nawanshahr.nic.in

Chak Mai Dass also spelled as Chak Maidas is a village in the Shaheed Bhagat Singh Nagar district of Punjab, India. It is located 3.7 kilometres (2.3 mi) away from postal head office Kultham, 14 kilometres (8.7 mi) from Banga, 25.6 kilometres (15.9 mi) from district headquarter Shaheed Bhagat Singh Nagar and 117 kilometres (73 mi) from state capital Chandigarh. The village is administrated by Sarpanch an elected representative of the village.

== Demography ==
As of 2011, Chak Mai Dass has a total number of 172 houses and population of 811 of which 417 include are males while 394 are females according to the report published by Census India in 2011. The literacy rate of Chak Mai Dass is 80.66%, higher than the state average of 75.84%. The population of children under the age of 6 years is 82 which is 10.11% of total population of Chak Mai Dass, and child sex ratio is approximately 822 as compared to Punjab state average of 846.

Most of the people are from Schedule Caste which constitutes 54.50% of total population in Chak Mai Dass. The town does not have any Schedule Tribe population so far.

As per the report published by Census India in 2011, 261 people were engaged in work activities out of the total population of Chak Mai Dass which includes 235 males and 26 females. According to census survey report 2011, 94.64% workers describe their work as main work and 5.36% workers are involved in Marginal activity providing livelihood for less than 6 months.

== Education ==
The village has a Punjabi medium, co-ed primary school founded in 1964. The schools provide mid-day meal as per Indian Midday Meal Scheme and the meal prepared in school premises. As per Right of Children to Free and Compulsory Education Act the school provide free education to children between the ages of 6 and 14. The village also has a Punjabi medium, privet un-aided primary with upper primary and secondary school which was founded in 2000.

Amardeep Singh Shergill Memorial college Mukandpur and Sikh National College Banga are the nearest colleges. Lovely Professional University is 20.8 kilometres (12.9 mi) away from the village.

== Transport ==
Banga railway station is the nearest train station however, Phagwara Junction railway station is 12.7 kilometres (7.9 mi) away from the village. Sahnewal Airport is the nearest domestic airport which located 62 kilometres (39 mi) away in Ludhiana and the nearest international airport is located in Chandigarh also Sri Guru Ram Dass Jee International Airport is the second nearest airport which is 129 kilometres (80 mi) away in Amritsar.

== See also ==
- List of villages in India
