= Chak Bilgan =

- Village
- Location in Punjab, India Chak Bilgan (India)
- Coordinates: 31.1827941°N 75.9082402°E
- Country: India
- State: Punjab
- District: Shaheed Bhagat Singh Nagar

Government
  - Type: Panchayat raj
  - Body: Gram panchayat
- Elevation: 251 m (823 ft)

Population (2011)
  - Total: 1,822
- Sex ratio 903/919 ♂/♀

Languages
  - Official: Punjabi
- Time zone: UTC+5:30 (IST)
- PIN: 144504
- Telephone code: 01823
- ISO 3166 code: IN-PB
- Post office: Behram Chak Bilgan
- Website: nawanshahr.nic.in

Chak Bilgan is a village in Shaheed Bhagat Singh Nagar district of Punjab State, India. It is located 3.6 kilometres (2.2 mi) away from postal head office Behram, 10 kilometres (6.2 mi) from Banga, 21 kilometres (13 mi) from district headquarter Shaheed Bhagat Singh Nagar and 114 kilometres (71 mi) from state capital Chandigarh. The village is administrated by Sarpanch Mr Balwant Singh, an elected representative of the village.

== Demography ==
As of 2011, Chak Bilgan has a total number of 389 houses and population of 1822 of which 903 include are males while 919 are females according to the report published by Census India in 2011. The literacy rate of Chak Bilgan is 87.42%, higher than the state average of 75.84%. The population of children under the age of 6 years is 193 which is 10.59% of total population of Chak Bilgan, and child sex ratio is approximately 921 as compared to Punjab state average of 846.

Most of the people are either Jatt sikhs or Ravidassias. Other prominent family names in the village consist of Bains, Sohals and Kajla. Schedule castes form 42.70% of total population in Chak Bilgan. The town does not have any Schedule Tribe population so far.

As per the report published by Census India in 2011, 547 people were engaged in work activities out of the total population of Chak Bilgan which includes 480 males and 67 females. According to census survey report 2011, 91.22% workers describe their work as main work and 8.78% workers are involved in Marginal activity providing livelihood for less than 6 months.

== Education ==
The village has a Punjabi medium, girls upper primary with secondary/higher secondary school founded in 1962. The schools provide mid-day meal as per Indian Midday Meal Scheme and the meal prepared in school premises. As per Right of Children to Free and Compulsory Education Act the school provide free education to children between the ages of 6 and 14.

Amardeep Singh Shergill Memorial college Mukandpur and Sikh National College Banga are the nearest colleges. Lovely Professional University is 24 kilometres (15 mi) away from the village.

== Transport ==
Behram railway station is the nearest train station however, Phagwara Junction railway station is 16.6 kilometres (10.3 mi) away from the village. Sahnewal Airport is the nearest domestic airport which located 65 kilometres (40 mi) away in Ludhiana and the nearest international airport is located in Chandigarh also Sri Guru Ram Dass Jee International Airport is the second nearest airport which is 133 kilometres (83 mi) away in Amritsar.

== See also ==
- List of villages in India
