= Chak Guru =

- Village
- Location in Punjab, India Chak Guru (India)
- Coordinates: 31.1577624°N 76.1752188°E
- Country: India
- State: Punjab
- District: Shaheed Bhagat Singh Nagar

Government
  - Type: Panchayat raj
  - Body: Gram panchayat
- Elevation: 251 m (823 ft)

Population (2011)
  - Total: 993

Languages
  - Official: Punjabi
- Time zone: UTC+5:30 (IST)
- PIN: 144501
- Telephone code: 01884
- ISO 3166 code: IN-PB
- Sex ratio: 882 ♂/♀
- Post office: Kultham
- Website: nawanshahr.nic.in

Chak Guru is a village in Shaheed Bhagat Singh Nagar district of Punjab State, India. It is located 9.2 kilometres (5.7 mi) away from Garhshankar, 17.6 kilometres (10.9 mi) from Balachaur, 17 kilometres (11 mi) from district headquarter Shaheed Bhagat Singh Nagar and 87 kilometres (54 mi) from state capital Chandigarh. The village is administrated by Sarpanch an elected representative of the village.

== Demography ==
As of 2011, Chak Guru has a total number of 224 houses and population of 993 of which 518 include are males while 475 are females according to the report published by Census India in 2011. The literacy rate of Chak Guru is 80.25%, higher than the state average of 75.84%. The population of children under the age of 6 years is 107 which is 10.78% of total population of Chak Guru, and child sex ratio is approximately 574 as compared to Punjab state average of 846.

Most of the people are from Schedule Caste which constitutes 66.06% of total population in Chak Guru. The town does not have any Schedule Tribe population so far.

As per the report published by Census India in 2011, 406 people were engaged in work activities out of the total population of Chak Guru which includes 282 males and 124 females. According to census survey report 2011, 89.16% workers describe their work as main work and 10.84% workers are involved in Marginal activity providing livelihood for less than 6 months.

== Education ==
The village has a Punjabi medium, co-ed upper primary school founded in 1976. The schools provide mid-day meal which prepared in school premises. as per Indian Midday Meal Scheme. As per Right of Children to Free and Compulsory Education Act the school provide free education to children between the ages of 6 and 14. The village also has an English medium, co-ed primary with upper primary and secondary school which was founded in 1997. Sikh National College Banga and Amardeep Singh Shergill Memorial college Mukandpur are the nearest colleges.

== Landmarks and history ==
The village has a historical Sikh shrine Gurudwara Gurpartap where Guru Tegh Bahadur visited and dug a well after seeing the shortage of drinking water. The land to build gurudwara was given by Maharaja Ranjit Singh.

== Transport ==
Garhshankar Junction train station is the nearest train station however, Nawanshahr railway station is 9 kilometres (5.6 mi) away from the village. Sahnewal Airport is the nearest domestic airport which located 63 kilometres (39 mi) away in Ludhiana and the nearest international airport is located in Chandigarh also Sri Guru Ram Dass Jee International Airport is the second nearest airport which is 164 kilometres (102 mi) away in Amritsar.

== See also ==
- List of villages in India
