= Chak Des Raj =

- Village/town
- Location in Punjab, India Chak Des Raj (India)
- Coordinates: 31.1230099°N 75.829997°E
- Country: India
- State: Punjab
- District: Jalandhar
- Tehsil: Phillaur
- Elevation: 246 m (807 ft)

Population (2011)
  - Total: 1,147
- Sex ratio 582/565 ♂/♀

Languages
  - Official: Punjabi
- Time zone: UTC+5:30 (IST)
- PIN: 144418
- Telephone code: 01826
- ISO 3166 code: IN-PB
- Vehicle registration: PB 37
- Post office: Bara Pind
- Website: jalandhar.nic.in

Chak Des Raj is a village in Phillaur tehsil of Jalandhar District of Punjab State, India. It is located 5.5 kilometres (3.4 mi) away from postal head office Bara Pind. The village is 20 kilometres (12 mi) away from Phillaur, 36.7 kilometres (22.8 mi) from Jalandhar, and 127 kilometres (79 mi) from state capital Chandigarh. The village is administrated by a sarpanch who is an elected representative of village as per Panchayati raj (India).

== Caste ==
The village has population of 1147 and in the village most of the villagers are from schedule caste (SC) which has constitutes 54.32% of total population of the village and it doesn't have any Schedule Tribe (ST) population.

== Education ==
The village has a Punjabi Medium, co-ed upper primary with secondary/higher secondary school (Gsss Chak Des Raj School). The school provides mid-day meal and it was founded in 1986.

== Transport ==
=== Rail ===
The nearest train station is situated 11 kilometres (6.8 mi) away in Goraya and Phagwara Jn Railway Station is 15 kilometres (9.3 mi) away from the village.

=== Air ===
The nearest domestic airport is 50 kilometres (31 mi) away in Ludhiana and the nearest international airport is 131 kilometres (81 mi) away in Amritsar other nearest international airport is located in Chandigarh.

== Notable people ==
- Sarwan Singh Phillaur
