= Farooqa =

City in Pakistan

Farooka فروکہ Pherooka, Farooka
- City
- فروکہ
- Map showing location of Farooka in Pakistan
- Coordinates: 31°53′07″N 72°24′55″E
- Country: Pakistan
- Province: Punjab
- District: Sargodha
- Established: 1861

Government
  - Body: Town Committee
  - MNA: Miqdad Ali khan (Independent)
  - MPA: Taimoor Ali Khan (PML N)

Area
  - City: 6 km^{2} (2.3 sq mi)
  - Urban: 4 km^{2} (1.5 sq mi)
- Elevation: 73 m (240 ft)
- Time zone: UTC+5 (PST)
- Calling code: +92 48

Farooka (Urdu : فروکہ) is a small town in Sargodha District (Urdu: سرگودھا), located in the Punjab province of Pakistan. The town is situated between the Jhelum and Chenab rivers.
