= Sahiwal Tehsil, Sargodha =

Pakistani administrative area

Sahiwal
- Tehsil
- Country: Pakistan
- Region: Punjab
- District: Sargodha
- Capital: Sahiwal, Sargodha
- Sahiwal: 1540 - 1545 (Tentative)

Government
  - Type: TMA Sahiwal
  - MPA: Barrister Taimur Ali Khan
  - MNA: Sardar Miqdad Ali Khan

Population (2016)
  - Total: 235,600
- Time zone: UTC+5
- Postal code: 40210
- Area code: 048

Sahiwal Tehsil (Punjabi,Urdu: تحصِيل ساہِيوال), is a subdivision (Tehsil) of Sargodha District in the Punjab province of Pakistan. It is approx. 40 km from Sargodha at the main Sargodha-Multan highway. It is administratively subdivided into 14 union councils, two of which form the Tehsil capital Sahiwal. The population of the city is 407,487 (2023 estimate) most being Muslim and speak the Punjabi language. The Jhelum River passes nearby.

== Administration ==
The Tehsil of Sahiwal is administratively subdivided into 14 union councils, these are:

- Azmatwala
- Dera Jara
- Farooka (Urban)
- Jahanian Shah
- Kudlathi Ara
- Lakhiwal Sharif
- Majoka
- Radhan
- Sahiwal-I
- Sahiwal-II
- Sajoka
- Sial Sharif
- Thati Jalal
- Vijh
